= Alpine skiing at the 2018 Winter Paralympics – Men's super combined =

Men's super combined at the XII Paralympic Winter Games
- Paralympic alpine skiing
- Venue: Jeongseon Alpine Centre, South Korea
- Dates: 13 March 2018
- Competitors: 75 from 26 nations

Men's super combined (visually impaired) at the XII Paralympic Winter Games
- Competitors: 13 from 9 nations

Medalists
1st place, gold medalist(s)		Miroslav Haraus; Guide: Maroš Hudík	Slovakia
2nd place, silver medalist(s)		Jon Santacana Maiztegui; Guide: Miguel Galindo Garcés	Spain
3rd place, bronze medalist(s)		Valery Redkozubov; Guide: Evgeny Geroev	Neutral Paralympic Athletes

Men's super combined (standing) at the XII Paralympic Winter Games
- Competitors: 32 from 18 nations

Medalists
1st place, gold medalist(s)		Alexey Bugaev	Neutral Paralympic Athletes
2nd place, silver medalist(s)		Arthur Bauchet	France
3rd place, bronze medalist(s)		Adam Hall	New Zealand

Men's super combined (sitting) at the XII Paralympic Winter Games
- Competitors: 30 from 17 nations

Medalists
1st place, gold medalist(s)		Jeroen Kampschreur	Netherlands
2nd place, silver medalist(s)		Frédéric François	France
3rd place, bronze medalist(s)		Jesper Pedersen	Norway

The Men's super combined competition of the 2018 Winter Paralympics was held at Jeongseon Alpine Centre, South Korea. The competition took place on 13 March 2018.

== Medal table ==
Rank	Nation	Gold	Silver	Bronze	Total
1	Neutral Paralympic Athletes (NPA)	1	0	1	2
2	Netherlands (NED)	1	0	0	1
2	Slovakia (SVK)	1	0	0	1
4	France (FRA)	0	2	0	2
5	Spain (ESP)	0	1	0	1
6	New Zealand (NZL)	0	0	1	1
6	Norway (NOR)	0	0	1	1
Totals (7 entries)		3	3	3	9

== Visually impaired ==
In the downhill visually impaired, the athlete with a visual impairment has a sighted guide. The two skiers are considered a team, and dual medals are awarded.

The super-G was started at 11:15 and the slalom was started at 16:02.

Rank	Bib	Name	Country	Super-G	Rank	Slalom	Rank	Total	Diff
1st place, gold medalist(s)	2	Miroslav Haraus; Guide: Maroš Hudík	Slovakia	1:25.02	1	49.20	3	2:14.22	–
2nd place, silver medalist(s)	3	Jon Santacana Maiztegui; Guide: Miguel Galindo Garcés	Spain	1:27.34	3	47.79	2	2:15.13	+0.91
3rd place, bronze medalist(s)	5	Valery Redkozubov; Guide: Evgeny Geroev	Neutral Paralympic Athletes	1:29.79	6	47.31	1	2:17.10	+2.88
4	4	Gernot Morgenfurt; Guide: Christoph Peter Gmeiner	Austria	1:29.64	5	50.82	4	2:20.46	+6.24
5	8	Kevin Burton; Guide: Brandon Ashby	United States	1:31.13	7	51.23	5	2:22.36	+8.14
6	10	Maciej Krężel; Guide: Anna Ograzyńska	Poland	1:34.75	10	52.20	6	2:26.95	+12.73
7	12	Mark Bathum; Guide: Cade Yamamoto	United States	1:34.64	9	53.00	7	2:27.64	+13.42
8	11	Patrik Hetmer; Guide: Miroslav Máčala	Czech Republic	1:31.27	8	57.44	8	2:28.71	+14.49
	9	Ivan Frantsev; Guide: German Agranovskii	Neutral Paralympic Athletes	1:28.84	4	DNF	—N/a		
	7	Jakub Krako; Guide: Branislav Brozman	Slovakia	1:25.79	2	DSQ	—N/a		
	1	Giacomo Bertagnolli; Guide: Fabrizio Casal	Italy	DNF	—N/a				
	6	Mac Marcoux; Guide: Jack Leitch	Canada	DNF	—N/a				
	13	Marek Kubačka; Guide: Mária Zatovičová	Slovakia	DNF	—N/a				

== Standing ==
The super-G was started at 11:50 and the slalom was started at 16:22.

Rank	Bib	Name	Country	Super-G	Rank	Slalom	Rank	Total	Difference
1st place, gold medalist(s)	28	Alexey Bugaev	Neutral Paralympic Athletes	1:25.62	2	44.94	1	2:10.56	–
2nd place, silver medalist(s)	17	Arthur Bauchet	France	1:24.90	1	45.98	2	2:10.88	+0.32
3rd place, bronze medalist(s)	24	Adam Hall	New Zealand	1:29.06	7	46.26	3	2:15.32	+4.76
4	42	Jamie Stanton	United States	1:29.80	10	46.75	4	2:16.55	+5.99
5	18	Mitchell Gourley	Australia	1:27.13	3	49.77	8	2:16.90	+6.34
6	21	Santeri Kiiveri	Finland	1:28.92	6	48.86	5	2:17.78	+7.22
7	22	Thomas Pfyl	Switzerland	1:29.08	8	49.42	7	2:18.50	+7.94
8	14	Martin France	Slovakia	1:27.62	4	50.92	11	2:18.54	+7.98
9	25	Kirk Schornstein	Canada	1:28.67	5	49.99	9	2:18.66	+8.10
10	20	Martin Würz	Austria	1:30.96	16	49.00	6	2:19.96	+9.40
11	16	James Whitley	Great Britain	1:30.21	13	50.07	10	2:20.28	+9.72
12	26	Hiraku Misawa	Japan	1:30.38	15	51.47	12	2:21.85	+11.29
13	39	Alexey Mikushin	Neutral Paralympic Athletes	1:36.82	20	52.14	13	2:28.96	+18.40
14	43	Gakuta Koike	Japan	1:38.64	21	56.35	14	2:34.99	+24.43
15	38	Tomáš Vaverka	Czech Republic	1:34.52	19	1:03.25	15	2:37.77	+27.21
	23	Thomas Grochar	Austria	1:30.33	14	DNF	—N/a		
	30	Jordan Broisin	France	1:29.81	11	DNF	—N/a		
	31	Michael Brügger	Switzerland	1:32.28	18	DNF	—N/a		
	40	Jeffrey Stuut	Netherlands	1:30.06	12	DNF	—N/a		
	44	Thomas Walsh	United States	1:29.13	9	DNF	—N/a		
	45	Aron Lindström	Sweden	1:31.10	17	DNF	—N/a		
	15	Robin Cuche	Switzerland	DNF	—N/a				
	19	Markus Salcher	Austria	DNF	—N/a				
	27	Theo Gmür	Switzerland	DNF	—N/a				
	29	Alexander Alyabyev	Neutral Paralympic Athletes	DNF	—N/a				
	32	Jasper Balcaen	Belgium	DNF	—N/a				
	33	Roger Puig Davi	Andorra	DNF	—N/a				
	34	Nico Pajantschitsch	Austria	DNF	—N/a				
	35	Davide Bendotti	Italy	DNF	—N/a				
	36	Jonty O'Callaghan	Australia	DNF	—N/a				
	37	Miroslav Lidinský	Czech Republic	DNF	—N/a				
	41	Braydon Luscombe	Canada	DNF	—N/a				

== Sitting ==
The super-G was started at 12:25 and the slalom at 16:42.

Rank	Bib	Name	Country	Super-G	Rank	Slalom	Rank	Total	Difference
1st place, gold medalist(s)	49	Jeroen Kampschreur	Netherlands	1:25.55	3	46.04	1	2:11.59	–
2nd place, silver medalist(s)	57	Frédéric François	France	1:25.08	2	47.83	3	2:12.91	+1.32
3rd place, bronze medalist(s)	48	Jesper Pedersen	Norway	1:24.72	1	49.02	5	2:13.74	+2.15
4	53	Takeshi Suzuki	Japan	1:28.65	9	47.02	2	2:15.67	+4.08
5	55	Yohann Taberlet	France	1:27.30	8	49.40	7	2:16.70	+5.11
6	61	Josh Elliott	United States	1:27.10	5	50.58	9	2:17.68	+6.09
7	74	Andrew Kurka	United States	1:27.17	6	50.56	8	2:17.73	+6.14
8	52	Niels de Langen	Netherlands	1:29.47	11	48.87	4	2:18.34	+6.75
9	65	Dino Sokolović	Croatia	1:31.65	15	49.07	6	2:20.72	+9.13
10	46	Christoph Kunz	Switzerland	1:29.33	10	52.81	10	2:22.14	+10.55
11	68	Han Sang-min	South Korea	1:29.48	12	54.24	12	2:23.72	+12.13
12	58	Jasmin Bambur	United States	1:31.53	14	53.69	11	2:25.22	+13.63
13	67	Kenji Natsume	Japan	1:32.28	17	58.65	13	2:30.93	+19.34
14	73	Pavel Bambousek	Czech Republic	1:35.83	21	1:01.64	14	2:37.47	+25.88
	51	Tyler Walker	United States	1:27.27	7	DNF	—N/a		
	54	Georg Kreiter	Germany	1:33.50	19	DNF	—N/a		
	60	Lee Chi-won	South Korea	1:32.20	16	DNF	—N/a		
	62	René De Silvestro	Italy	1:31.39	13	DNF	—N/a		
	64	Enrique Plantey	Argentina	1:35.97	22	DNF	—N/a		
	69	Mark Soyer	Australia	1:33.24	18	DNF	—N/a		
	70	Akira Kano	Japan	1:26.91	4	DSQ	—N/a		
	72	Simon Wallner	Austria	1:35.59	20	DSQ	—N/a		
	47	Roman Rabl	Austria	DNF	—N/a				
	50	Kurt Oatway	Canada	DNF	—N/a				
	56	Taiki Morii	Japan	DNF	—N/a				
	59	Murat Pelit	Switzerland	DNF	—N/a				
	63	Igor Sikorski	Poland	DNF	—N/a				
	66	Thomas Nolte	Germany	DNF	—N/a				
	71	Sam Tait	Australia	DNF	—N/a				
	75	Nicolas Bisquertt Hudson	Chile	DNF	—N/a				

== See also ==
- Alpine skiing at the 2018 Winter Olympics
