= Alpine skiing at the 2018 Winter Paralympics – Men's giant slalom =

Men's giant slalom at the XII Paralympic Winter Games
- Paralympic alpine skiing
- Venue: Jeongseon Alpine Centre, South Korea
- Dates: 14 March 2018
- Competitors: 97 from 31 nations

Men's giant slalom (visually impaired) at the XII Paralympic Winter Games
- Competitors: 18 from 13 nations

Medalists
| 1st place, gold medalist(s) | | Giacomo Bertagnolli; Guide: Fabrizio Casal | Italy |
| 2nd place, silver medalist(s) | | Jakub Krako; Guide: Branislav Brozman | Slovakia |
| 3rd place, bronze medalist(s) | | Mac Marcoux; Guide: Jack Leithch | Canada |

Men's giant slalom (standing) at the XII Paralympic Winter Games
- Competitors: 42 from 21 nations

Medalists
| 1st place, gold medalist(s) | | Théo Gmür | Switzerland |
| 2nd place, silver medalist(s) | | Alexey Bugaev | Neutral Paralympic Athletes |
| 3rd place, bronze medalist(s) | | Alexis Guimond | Canada |

Men's giant slalom (sitting) at the XII Paralympic Winter Games
- Competitors: 37 from 20 nations

Medalists
| 1st place, gold medalist(s) | | Jesper Pedersen | Norway |
| 2nd place, silver medalist(s) | | Tyler Walker | United States |
| 3rd place, bronze medalist(s) | | Igor Sikorski | Poland |

The Men's slalom competition of the 2018 Winter Paralympics was held at Jeongseon Alpine Centre, South Korea. The competition took place on 14 March 2018.

== Medal table ==
| Rank | Nation | Gold | Silver | Bronze | Total |
|---|---|---|---|---|---|
| 1 | Italy (ITA) | 1 | 0 | 0 | 1 |
| 1 | Norway (NOR) | 1 | 0 | 0 | 1 |
| 1 | Switzerland (SUI) | 1 | 0 | 0 | 1 |
| 4 | Neutral Paralympic Athletes (NPA) | 0 | 1 | 0 | 1 |
| 4 | Slovakia (SVK) | 0 | 1 | 0 | 1 |
| 4 | United States (USA) | 0 | 1 | 0 | 1 |
| 7 | Canada (CAN) | 0 | 0 | 2 | 2 |
| 8 | Poland (POL) | 0 | 0 | 1 | 1 |
| Totals (8 entries) | | 3 | 3 | 3 | 9 |

== Visually impaired ==
In the downhill visually impaired, the athlete with a visual impairment has a sighted guide. The two skiers are considered a team, and dual medals are awarded.

Run 1 was started at 09:30 and run 2 was started at 14:15.

| Rank | Bib | Name | Country | Run 1 | Rank | Run 2 | Rank | Total | Diff |
|---|---|---|---|---|---|---|---|---|---|
| 1st place, gold medalist(s) | 7 | Giacomo Bertagnolli; Guide: Fabrizio Casal | Italy | 1:05.12 | 1 | 1:05.39 | 1 | 2:10.51 | – |
| 2nd place, silver medalist(s) | 2 | Jakub Krako; Guide: Branislav Brozman | Slovakia | 1:08.49 | 3 | 1:07.10 | 2 | 2:15.59 | +5.08 |
| 3rd place, bronze medalist(s) | 10 | Mac Marcoux; Guide: Jack Leitch | Canada | 1:09.44 | 4 | 1:08.07 | 3 | 2:17.51 | +7.00 |
| 4 | 11 | Miroslav Haraus; Guide: Maroš Hudík | Slovakia | 1:08.31 | 2 | 1:09.36 | 5 | 2:17.67 | +7.16 |
| 5 | 8 | Marek Kubačka; Guide: Mária Zaťovičová | Slovakia | 1:10.02 | 5 | 1:08.91 | 4 | 2:18.93 | +8.42 |
| 6 | 9 | Valerii Redkobuzov; Guide: Evgeny Geroev | Neutral Paralympic Athletes | 1:10.59 | 7 | 1:09.63 | 6 | 2:20.22 | +9.71 |
| 7 | 1 | Jon Santacana Maiztegui; Guide: Miguel Galindo | Spain | 1:10.43 | 6 | 1:09.91 | 7 | 2:20.34 | +9.83 |
| 8 | 6 | Ivan Frantsev; Guide: German Agranovskii | Neutral Paralympic Athletes | 1:11.22 | 8 | 1:10.17 | 8 | 2:21.39 | +10.88 |
| 9 | 4 | Gernot Morgenfurt; Guide: Christoph Peter Gmeiner | Austria | 1:13.38 | 9 | 1:11.99 | 9 | 2:25.37 | +14.86 |
| 10 | 3 | Macięj Kreżel; Guide: Anna Ogarzyńska | Poland | 1:13.75 | 10 | 1:12.68 | 10 | 2:26.43 | +15.92 |
| 11 | 14 | Patrick Jensen; Guide: Lara Falk | Australia | 1:16.55 | 11 | 1:15.61 | 12 | 2:32.16 | +21.65 |
| 12 | 17 | Tadeáš Kříž; Guide: Radim Nevrlý | Czech Republic | 1:18.03 | 12 | 1:14.45 | 11 | 2:32.48 | +21.97 |
| 13 | 18 | Hwang Min-gyu; Guide: Yu Jea-hyung | South Korea | 1:21.23 | 13 | 1:15.85 | 13 | 2:37.08 | +26.57 |
| 14 | 13 | Shaun Pianta; Guide: Jeremy O'Sullivan | Australia | 1:25.97 | 14 | 1:21.88 | 14 | 2:47.85 | +37.34 |
| 15 | 16 | Zsolt Balogh; Guide: Bence Bocsi | Hungary | 1:27.87 | 15 | 1:25.40 | 16 | 2:53.27 | +42.76 |
| 16 | 15 | Damir Mizdrak; Guide: Luka Debeljak | Croatia | 1:30.45 | 16 | 1:24.78 | 15 | 2:55.23 | +44.72 |
| | 12 | Patrik Hetmer; Guide: Miroslav Máčala | Czech Republic | DNF | —N/a | | | | |
| | 5 | Kevin Burton; Guide: Brandon Ashby | United States | DSQ | —N/a | | | | |

== Standing ==
Run 1 was started at 10:30 and run 2 was started at 14:22.

| Rank | Bib | Name | Country | Run 1 | Rank | Run 2 | Rank | Total | Difference |
|---|---|---|---|---|---|---|---|---|---|
| 1st place, gold medalist(s) | 33 | Théo Gmür | Switzerland | 1:05.70 | 1 | 1:06.77 | 3 | 2:12.47 | – |
| 2nd place, silver medalist(s) | 21 | Alexey Bugaev | Neutral Paralympic Athletes | 1:06.96 | 3 | 1:06.53 | 2 | 2:13.49 | +1.02 |
| 3rd place, bronze medalist(s) | 30 | Alexis Guimond | Canada | 1:08.23 | 6 | 1:05.44 | 1 | 2:13.67 | +1.20 |
| 4 | 31 | Martin France | Slovakia | 1:07.73 | 4 | 1:07.07 | 4 | 2:14.80 | +2.33 |
| 5 | 27 | Markus Salcher | Austria | 1:08.26 | 7 | 1:07.39 | 5 | 2:15.65 | +3.18 |
| 6 | 20 | Santeri Kiiveri | Finland | 1:08.64 | 8 | 1:07.62 | 7 | 2:16.26 | +3.79 |
| 7 | 24 | Thomas Walsh | United States | 1:08.92 | 9 | 1:07.39 | 5 | 2:16.31 | +3.84 |
| 8 | 29 | Mitchell Gourley | Australia | 1:07.87 | 5 | 1:08.60 | 8 | 2:16.47 | +4.00 |
| 9 | 23 | Thomas Pfyl | Switzerland | 1:09.81 | 11 | 1:08.65 | 9 | 2:18.46 | +5.99 |
| 10 | 22 | Martin Würz | Austria | 1:10.31 | 15 | 1:09.16 | 10 | 2:19.47 | +7.00 |
| 11 | 25 | James Whitley | Great Britain | 1:09.81 | 11 | 1:10.00 | 12 | 2:19.81 | +7.34 |
| 12 | 44 | Jeffrey Stuut | Netherlands | 1:11.31 | 18 | 1:09.86 | 11 | 2:21.17 | +8.70 |
| 13 | 40 | Kirk Schornstein | Canada | 1:10.78 | 16 | 1:10.46 | 13 | 2:21.24 | +8.77 |
| 14 | 36 | Jamie Stanton | United States | 1:09.44 | 10 | 1:11.86 | 13 | 2:21.30 | +08.83 |
| 15 | 38 | Alexander Alyabyev | Neutral Paralympic Athletes | 1:11.24 | 17 | 1:10.70 | 14 | 2:21.94 | +9.47 |
| 16 | 34 | Aron Lindström | Sweden | 1:12.19 | 20 | 1:12.97 | 18 | 2:25.16 | +12.69 |
| 17 | 45 | Alexey Mikushin | Neutral Paralympic Athletes | 1:13.05 | 23 | 1:12.37 | 16 | 2:25.42 | +12.95 |
| 18 | 48 | Gakuta Koike | Japan | 1:13.29 | 24 | 1:13.09 | 19 | 2:26.38 | +13.91 |
| 19 | 52 | Davide Bendotti | Italy | 1:14.21 | 25 | 1:12.61 | 17 | 2:26.82 | +14.35 |
| 20 | 56 | Hilmar Örvarsson | Iceland | 1:15.03 | 26 | 1:14.79 | 20 | 2:29.82 | +17.35 |
| 21 | 53 | Kohei Takahashi | Japan | 1:15.43 | 28 | 1:16.21 | 22 | 2:31.64 | +19.17 |
| 22 | 55 | Tomáš Vaverka | Czech Republic | 1:15.93 | 32 | 1:15.85 | 21 | 2:31.78 | +19.31 |
| 23 | 42 | Jonty O'Callaghan | Australia | 1:15.64 | 29 | 1:16.58 | 25 | 2:32.22 | +19.75 |
| 24 | 43 | Connor Hogan | United States | 1:15.90 | 31 | 1:16.57 | 24 | 2:32.47 | +20.00 |
| 25 | 51 | Spencer Wood | United States | 1:16.45 | 33 | 1:16.54 | 23 | 2:32.99 | +20.52 |
| 26 | 54 | Miroslav Lidinský | Czech Republic | 1:21.48 | 34 | 1:19.58 | 26 | 2:41.06 | +28.59 |
| 27 | 59 | Lovro Dokić | Croatia | 1:23.70 | 35 | 1:24.69 | 27 | 2:48.39 | +35.92 |
| 28 | 57 | Julio Andrés Soto Ugalde | Chile | 1:25.94 | 36 | 1:27.81 | 28 | 2:53.75 | +41.28 |
| 29 | 60 | Sergey Alexandrov | Neutral Paralympic Athletes | 1:26.16 | 37 | 1:27.87 | 29 | 2:54.03 | +41.56 |
| 30 | 58 | Mehmet Çekiç | Turkey | 1:27.18 | 38 | 1:28.56 | 30 | 2:55.74 | +43.27 |
| | 26 | Arthur Bauchet | France | 1:06.40 | 2 | DNF | —N/a | | |
| | 28 | Robin Cuche | Switzerland | 1:09.99 | 14 | DNF | —N/a | | |
| | 32 | Hiraku Misawa | Japan | 1:12.06 | 19 | DNF | —N/a | | |
| | 39 | Nico Pajantschitsch | Austria | 1:09.89 | 13 | DNF | —N/a | | |
| | 46 | Tyler Carter | United States | 1:15.23 | 27 | DNF | —N/a | | |
| | 49 | Santiago Vega | Chile | 1:15.75 | 30 | DNF | —N/a | | |
| | 50 | Michael Brügger | Switzerland | 1:13.01 | 22 | DNF | —N/a | | |
| | 35 | Braydon Luscombe | Canada | 1:12.53 | 21 | DNS | —N/a | | |
| | 19 | Thomas Grochar | Austria | DNF | —N/a | | | | |
| | 37 | Jordan Broisin | France | DNF | —N/a | | | | |
| | 41 | Roger Puig Davi | Andorra | DNF | —N/a | | | | |
| | 47 | Jasper Balcaen | Belgium | DNS | —N/a | | | | |

== Sitting ==
| Rank | Bib | Name | Country | Run 1 | Rank | Run 2 | Rank | Total | Difference |
|---|---|---|---|---|---|---|---|---|---|
| 1st place, gold medalist(s) | 67 | Jesper Pedersen | Norway | 1:07.48 | 2 | 1:05.97 | 1 | 2:13.45 | – |
| 2nd place, silver medalist(s) | 65 | Tyler Walker | United States | 1:06.30 | 1 | 1:07.49 | 3 | 2:13.79 | +0.34 |
| 3rd place, bronze medalist(s) | 66 | Igor Sikorski | Poland | 1:08.69 | 3 | 1:07.21 | 2 | 2:15.90 | +2.45 |
| 4 | 64 | Takeshi Suzuki | Japan | 1:09.90 | 6 | 1:07.90 | 5 | 2:17.80 | +4.35 |
| 5 | 76 | Akira Kano | Japan | 1:09.28 | 4 | 1:08.84 | 8 | 2:18.12 | +4.67 |
| 6 | 75 | Christoph Kunz | Switzerland | 1:10.40 | 8 | 1:07.76 | 4 | 2:18.16 | +4.71 |
| 7 | 69 | Roman Rabl | Austria | 1:10.32 | 7 | 1:08.60 | 7 | 2:28.92 | +5.47 |
| 8 | 77 | René de Silvestro | Italy | 1:10.56 | 9 | 1:08.55 | 6 | 2:19.11 | +5.66 |
| 9 | 62 | Markus Gfatterhofer | Austria | 1:10.75 | 11 | 1:09.03 | 9 | 2:19.78 | +6.33 |
| 10 | 71 | Corey Peters | New Zealand | 1:11.07 | 12 | 1:09.16 | 10 | 2:20.23 | +6.78 |
| 11 | 78 | Han Sang-min | South Korea | 1:10.73 | 10 | 1:10.58 | 12 | 2:21.31 | +7.86 |
| 12 | 82 | Kurt Oatway | Canada | 1:12.56 | 16 | 1:09.85 | 11 | 2:22.41 | +8.96 |
| 13 | 79 | Kenji Natsume | Japan | 1:11.45 | 14 | 1:11.78 | 15 | 2:23.23 | +9.78 |
| 14 | 88 | Alex Cairns | Canada | 1:12.45 | 15 | 1:11.07 | 14 | 2:23.52 | +10.07 |
| 15 | 91 | Dino Sokolović | Croatia | 1:12.99 | 17 | 1:13.10 | 17 | 2:26.09 | +12.64 |
| 16 | 81 | Murat Pelit | Switzerland | 1:13.73 | 19 | 1:14.22 | 18 | 2:27.95 | +14.50 |
| 17 | 97 | Sam Tait | Australia | 1:17.36 | 24 | 1:10.92 | 13 | 2:28.28 | +14.83 |
| 18 | 89 | Mark Soyer | Australia | 1:16.95 | 22 | 1:12.99 | 16 | 2:29.94 | +16.49 |
| 19 | 87 | Simon Wallner | Austria | 1:16.02 | 21 | 1:14.49 | 19 | 2:30.51 | +17.06 |
| | 68 | Jasmin Bambur | United States | 1:13.52 | 18 | DNF | —N/a | | |
| | 80 | Frédéric François | France | 1:11.19 | 13 | DNF | —N/a | | |
| | 84 | Nicolás Bisquertt | Chile | 1:09.75 | 5 | DNF | —N/a | | |
| | 85 | Stephen Lawler | United States | 1:17.20 | 23 | DNF | —N/a | | |
| | 86 | Lee Chi-won | South Korea | 1:14.21 | 20 | DNF | —N/a | | |
| | 96 | Diego Seguel | Chile | 1:23.69 | 25 | DNF | —N/a | | |
| | 61 | Taiki Morii | Japan | DNF | —N/a | | | | |
| | 63 | Josh Elliott | United States | DNF | —N/a | | | | |
| | 70 | Georg Kreiter | Germany | DNF | —N/a | | | | |
| | 73 | Niels de Langen | Netherlands | DNF | —N/a | | | | |
| | 74 | Andrew Kurka | United States | DNF | —N/a | | | | |
| | 83 | Yohann Taberlet | France | DNF | —N/a | | | | |
| | 90 | Enrique Plantey | Argentina | DNF | —N/a | | | | |
| | 92 | Thomas Nolte | Germany | DNF | —N/a | | | | |
| | 93 | Arly Velásquez | Mexico | DNF | —N/a | | | | |
| | 94 | Pavel Bamboušek | Czech Republic | DNF | —N/a | | | | |
| | 95 | Jernej Slivnik | Slovenia | DNF | —N/a | | | | |
| | 72 | Jeroen Kampschreur | Netherlands | DSQ | —N/a | | | | |

== See also ==
- Alpine skiing at the 2018 Winter Olympics
