= Alpine skiing at the 2018 Winter Paralympics – Men's slalom =

Men's slalom at the XII Paralympic Winter Games
- Paralympic alpine skiing
- Venue: Jeongseon Alpine Centre, South Korea
- Dates: 17 March 2018
- Competitors: 89 from 30 nations

Men's slalom (visually impaired) at the XII Paralympic Winter Games
- Competitors: 18 from 13 nations

Medalists
1st place, gold medalist(s)		Giacomo Bertagnolli; Guide: Fabrizio Casal	Italy
2nd place, silver medalist(s)		Jakub Krako; Guide: Branislav Brozman	Slovakia
3rd place, bronze medalist(s)		Valery Redkozubov; Guide: Evgeny Geroev	Neutral Paralympic Athletes

Men's slalom (standing) at the XII Paralympic Winter Games
- Competitors: 40 from 22 nations

Medalists
1st place, gold medalist(s)		Adam Hall	New Zealand
2nd place, silver medalist(s)		Arthur Bauchet	France
3rd place, bronze medalist(s)		Jamie Stanton	United States

Men's slalom (sitting) at the XII Paralympic Winter Games
- Competitors: 31 from 18 nations

Medalists
1st place, gold medalist(s)		Dino Sokolović	Croatia
2nd place, silver medalist(s)		Tyler Walker	United States
3rd place, bronze medalist(s)		Frédéric François	France

The Men's slalom competition of the 2018 Winter Paralympics was held at Jeongseon Alpine Centre, South Korea. The competition took place on 17 March 2018.

== Medal table ==
Rank	Nation	Gold	Silver	Bronze	Total
1	Croatia (CRO)	1	0	0	1
1	Italy (ITA)	1	0	0	1
1	New Zealand (NZL)	1	0	0	1
4	France (FRA)	0	1	1	2
4	United States (USA)	0	1	1	2
6	Slovakia (SVK)	0	1	0	1
7	Neutral Paralympic Athletes (NPA)	0	0	1	1
Totals (7 entries)		3	3	3	9

== Visually impaired ==
In the downhill visually impaired, the athlete with a visual impairment has a sighted guide. The two skiers are considered a team, and dual medals are awarded.

Run 1 was started at 09:30 and run 2 was started at 14:00.

Rank	Bib	Name	Country	Run 1	Rank	Run 2	Rank	Total	Diff
1st place, gold medalist(s)	10	Giacomo Bertagnolli; Guide: Fabrizio Casal	Italy	48.85	2	47.27	1	1:36.12	–
2nd place, silver medalist(s)	3	Jakub Krako; Guide: Branislav Brozman	Slovakia	49.07	3	48.47	2	1:37.54	+1.42
3rd place, bronze medalist(s)	9	Valery Redkozubov; Guide: Evgeny Geroev	Neutral Paralympic Athletes	49.10	4	48.92	4	1:38.02	+1.90
4	8	Mac Marcoux; Guide: Jack Leitch	Canada	49.45	5	48.78	3	1:38.39	+2.27
5	2	Gernot Morgenfurt; Guide: Christoph Peter Gmeiner	Austria	50.31	6	51.30	5	1:41.61	+5.49
6	4	Maciej Krężel; Guide: Anna Ogarzyńska	Poland	52.63	7	51.50	6	1:44.13	+8.01
7	6	Marek Kubačka; Guide: Mária Zaťovičová	Slovakia	52.78	8	55.34	7	1:48.12	+12.00
8	16	Patrik Hetmer; Guide: Miroslav Máčala	Czech Republic	57.61	11	59.67	9	1:57.28	+21.16
9	14	Damir Mizdrak; Guide: Luka Debeljak	Croatia	1:01.72	12	59.60	8	2:01.32	+25.20
	11	Kevin Burton; Guide: Brandon Ashby	United States	54.18	9	DNF	—N/a		
	13	Hwang Min-gyu; Guide: Yu Jea-hyung	South Korea	55.92	10	DNF	—N/a		
	1	Miroslav Haraus; Guide: Maroš Hudík	Slovakia	47.96	1	DSQ	—N/a		
	5	Ivan Frantsev; Guide: German Agranovskii	Neutral Paralympic Athletes	DNF	—N/a				
	7	Jon Santacana Maiztegui; Guide: Miguel Galindo Garces	Spain	DNF	—N/a				
	12	Patrick Jensen; Guide: Lara Falk	Australia	DNF	—N/a				
	15	Zsolt Balogh; Guide: Bence Bocsi	Hungary	DNF	—N/a				
	17	Tadeáš Kříž; Guide: Radim Nevrlý	Czech Republic	DNF	—N/a				
	18	Shaun Pianta; Guide: Jeremy O'Sullivan	Australia	DNF	—N/a				

== Standing ==
Run 1 was started at 10:30 and run 2 was started at 14:22.

Rank	Bib	Name	Country	Run 1	Rank	Run 2	Rank	Total	Difference
1st place, gold medalist(s)	21	Adam Hall	New Zealand	48.69	3	47.42	1	1:36.11	–
2nd place, silver medalist(s)	32	Arthur Bauchet	France	48.54	2	47.96	2	1:36.50	+0.39
3rd place, bronze medalist(s)	25	Jamie Stanton	United States	48.51	1	48.86	3	1:37.37	+1.26
4	27	Santeri Kiiveri	Finland	49.61	6	50.14	4	1:39.75	+3.64
5	26	Thomas Walsh	United States	49.33	5	52.87	10	1:42.20	+6.09
6	23	Mitchell Gourley	Australia	48.69	3	53.63	12	1:42.32	+6.21
7	29	Aron Lindström	Sweden	51.72	10	51.23	5	1:42.95	+6.84
8	30	Alexander Alyabyev	Neutral Paralympic Athletes	50.37	7	53.15	11	1:43.52	+7.41
9	28	Thomas Pfyl	Switzerland	51.47	9	52.46	9	1:43.93	+7.82
10	31	James Whitley	Great Britain	52.61	11	51.80	6	1:44.41	+8.30
11	37	Martin France	Slovakia	53.96	13	52.27	7	1:46.23	+10.12
12	44	Davide Bendotti	Italy	53.34	12	54.14	13	1:47.48	+11.37
13	47	Hilmar Örvarsson	Iceland	58.32	17	52.27	7	1:50.59	+14.48
14	38	Jordan Broisin	France	56.52	15	54.14	13	1:50.66	+14.55
15	42	Jasper Balcaen	Belgium	57.89	16	56.05	15	1:53.94	+17.83
16	46	Alexey Mikushin	Neutral Paralympic Athletes	54.60	14	1:02.88	20	1:57.48	+21.37
17	48	Kohei Takahashi	Japan	1:00.06	18	58.31	18	1:58.37	+22.26
18	45	Gakuta Koike	Japan	1:01.16	20	57.47	16	1:58.63	+22.52
19	49	Tyler Carter	United States	1:02.22	21	1:01.08	19	2:03.30	+27.19
20	50	Roger Puig Davi	Andorra	1:06.68	24	57.75	17	2:04.43	+28.32
21	53	Miroslav Lidinský	Czech Republic	1:05.65	23	1:04.52	22	2:10.17	+34.06
22	55	Lovro Dokić	Croatia	1:07.61	25	1:03.64	21	2:11.25	+35.14
23	56	Sergey Alexandrov	Neutral Paralympic Athletes	1:08.50	26	1:07.86	23	2:16.36	+40.25
	33	Martin Würz	Austria	50.45	8	DNF	—N/a		
	52	Spencer Wood	United States	1:00.39	19	DNF	—N/a		
	57	Mehmet Çekiç	Turkey	1:16.53	27	DNF	—N/a		
	51	Connor Hogan	United States	1:02.59	22	DNS	—N/a		
	19	Thomas Grochar	Austria	DNF	—N/a				
	20	Alexey Bugaev	Neutral Paralympic Athletes	DNF	—N/a				
	22	Jeffrey Stuut	Netherlands	DNF	—N/a				
	24	Kirk Schornstein	Canada	DNF	—N/a				
	34	Hiraku Misawa	Japan	DNF	—N/a				
	35	Michael Brügger	Switzerland	DNF	—N/a				
	36	Braydon Luscombe	Canada	DNF	—N/a				
	39	Robin Cuche	Switzerland	DNF	—N/a				
	40	Nico Pajantschitsch	Austria	DNF	—N/a				
	41	Jonty O'Callaghan	Australia	DNF	—N/a				
	43	Alexis Guimond	Canada	DNF	—N/a				
	54	Julio Andres Soto Ugalde	Chile	DNF	—N/a				
	58	Santiago Vega	Chile	DNF	—N/a				

== Sitting ==
Run 1 was started at 11:30 and run 2 was started at 14:57.

Rank	Bib	Name	Country	Run 1	Rank	Run 2	Rank	Total	Difference
1st place, gold medalist(s)	61	Dino Sokolović	Croatia	49.13	3	50.69	3	1:39.82	–
2nd place, silver medalist(s)	73	Tyler Walker	United States	49.08	2	51.47	6	1:40.55	+0.73
3rd place, bronze medalist(s)	67	Frédéric François	France	51.53	4	50.50	1	1:42.03	+2.21
4	68	Taiki Morii	Japan	51.55	5	50.73	4	1:42.28	+2.46
5	62	Jesper Pedersen	Norway	51.62	6	50.67	2	1:42.29	+2.47
6	72	Igor Sikorski	Poland	52.25	7	50.89	5	1:43.14	+3.32
7	74	René De Silvestro	Italy	52.97	8	52.43	8	1:45.40	+5.58
8	65	Roman Rabl	Austria	57.43	9	52.39	7	1:49.82	+10.00
9	85	Nicolás Bisquertt	Chile	59.39	12	55.23	9	1:54.62	+14.80
10	83	Alex Cairns	Canada	59.47	13	57.47	10	1:56.94	+17.12
11	80	Enrique Plantey	Argentina	59.52	14	59.59	11	1:59.11	+19.29
12	86	Jernej Slivnik	Slovenia	59.26	11	59.87	12	1:59.13	+19.31
13	78	Murat Pelit	Switzerland	1:04.87	15	1:02.05	13	2:06.92	+27.10
14	79	Thomas Nolte	Germany	59.20	10	1:10.67	14	2:09.87	+30.05
	60	Jeroen Kampschreur	Netherlands	48.40	1	DNF	—N/a		
	59	Takeshi Suzuki	Japan	DNF	—N/a				
	63	Yohann Taberlet	France	DNF	—N/a				
	64	Akira Kano	Japan	DNF	—N/a				
	66	Jasmin Bambur	United States	DNF	—N/a				
	69	Kurt Oatway	Canada	DNF	—N/a				
	70	Niels de Langen	Netherlands	DNF	—N/a				
	71	Josh Elliott	United States	DNF	—N/a				
	75	Markus Gfatterhofer	Austria	DNF	—N/a				
	76	Han Sang-min	South Korea	DNF	—N/a				
	77	Simon Wallner	Austria	DNF	—N/a				
	81	Lee Chi-won	South Korea	DNF	—N/a				
	82	Mark Soyer	Australia	DNF	—N/a				
	84	Kenji Natsume	Japan	DNF	—N/a				
	87	Pavel Bambousek	Czech Republic	DNF	—N/a				
	88	Sam Tait	Australia	DNF	—N/a				
	89	Diego Seguel	Chile	DNF	—N/a				

== See also ==
- Alpine skiing at the 2018 Winter Olympics
