= Alpine skiing at the 2018 Winter Paralympics – Men's downhill =

Men's downhill at the XII Paralympic Winter Games
- Paralympic alpine skiing
- Venue: Jeongseon Alpine Centre, South Korea
- Dates: 10 March 2018
- Competitors: 65 from 24 nations

Men's downhill (visually impaired) at the XII Paralympic Winter Games
- Competitors: 10 from 8 nations

Medalists
1st place, gold medalist(s)		Mac Marcoux; Guide: Jack Leitch	Canada
2nd place, silver medalist(s)		Jakub Krako; Guide: Branislav Brozman	Slovakia
3rd place, bronze medalist(s)		Giacomo Bertagnolli; Guide: Fabrizio Casal	Italy

Men's downhill (standing) at the XII Paralympic Winter Games
- Competitors: 29 from 16 nations

Medalists
1st place, gold medalist(s)		Theo Gmür	Switzerland
2nd place, silver medalist(s)		Arthur Bauchet	France
3rd place, bronze medalist(s)		Markus Salcher	Austria

Men's downhill (sitting) at the XII Paralympic Winter Games
- Competitors: 26 from 17 nations

Medalists
1st place, gold medalist(s)		Andrew Kurka	United States
2nd place, silver medalist(s)		Taiki Morii	Japan
3rd place, bronze medalist(s)		Corey Peters	New Zealand

The Men's downhill competition of the 2018 Winter Paralympics was held at Jeongseon Alpine Centre, South Korea. The competition took place on 10 March 2018.

== Visually impaired ==
In the downhill visually impaired, the athlete with a visual impairment has a sighted guide. The two skiers are considered a team, and dual medals are awarded.

The race was started at 10:47.

Rank	Bib	Name	Country	Time	Difference
1st place, gold medalist(s)	3	Mac Marcoux; Guide: Jack Leitch	Canada	1:23.93	–
2nd place, silver medalist(s)	5	Jakub Krako; Guide: Branislav Brozman	Slovakia	1:25.35	+1.42
3rd place, bronze medalist(s)	8	Giacomo Bertagnolli; Guide: Fabrizio Casal	Italy	1:26.46	+2.53
4	2	Jon Santacana Maiztegui; Guide: Miguel Galindo Garcés	Spain	1:27.40	+3.47
5	4	Ivan Frantsev; Guide: German Agranovskii	Neutral Paralympic Athletes	1:30.72	+6.79
6	6	Patrik Hetmer; Guide: Miroslav Máčala	Czech Republic	1:31.21	+7.28
7	1	Kevin Burton; Guide: Brandon Ashby	United States	1:31.35	+7.42
8	10	Maciej Krężel; Guide: Anna Ogarzyńska	Poland	1:38.25	+14.32
	7	Miroslav Haraus; Guide: Maros Hudik	Slovakia	DNF	
	9	Mark Bathum; Guide: Cade Yamamoto	United States	DNF	

== Standing ==
The race was started at 11:07.

Rank	Bib	Name	Country	Time	Difference
1st place, gold medalist(s)	12	Theo Gmür	Switzerland	1:25.45	–
2nd place, silver medalist(s)	19	Arthur Bauchet	France	1:26.29	+0.84
3rd place, bronze medalist(s)	24	Markus Salcher	Austria	1:26.39	+0.94
4	13	Alexis Guimond	Canada	1:27.09	+1.64
5	16	Adam Hall	New Zealand	1:27.52	+2.07
6	14	Kirk Schornstein	Canada	1:28.53	+3.08
7	27	Alexey Bugaev	Neutral Paralympic Athletes	1:28.68	+3.23
8	20	Robin Cuche	Switzerland	1:29.28	+3.83
9	23	Thomas Pfyl	Switzerland	1:29.77	+4.32
10	25	James Whitley	Great Britain	1:29.85	+4.40
11	18	Alexander Alyabyev	Neutral Paralympic Athletes	1:30.41	+4.96
12	28	Nico Pajantschitsch	Austria	1:30.50	+5.05
13	15	Santeri Kiiveri	Finland	1:30.64	+5.19
14	26	Jordan Broisin	France	1:30.74	+5.29
15	22	Hiraku Misawa	Japan	1:31.23	+5.78
16	31	Martin France	Slovakia	1:31.82	+6.37
17	30	Michael Brügger	Switzerland	1:32.81	+7.36
18	29	Andrew Haraghey	United States	1:32.84	+7.39
19	11	Jeffrey Stuut	Netherlands	1:33.14	+7.69
20	32	Chris Lloyd	Great Britain	1:34.00	+8.55
21	38	Davide Bendotti	Italy	1:34.69	+9.24
22	33	Jonty O'Callaghan	Australia	1:34.86	+9.41
23	39	Alexey Mikushin	Neutral Paralympic Athletes	1:35.67	+10.22
24	37	Tomáš Vaverka	Czech Republic	1:37.83	+12.38
	17	Mitchell Gourley	Australia	DNF	
	21	Braydon Luscombe	Canada	DNF	
	34	Gakuta Koike	Japan	DNF	
	35	Miroslav Lidinský	Czech Republic	DNF	
	36	Roger Puig Davi	Andorra	DNF	

== Sitting ==
The race was started at 11:57.

Rank	Bib	Name	Country	Time	Difference
1st place, gold medalist(s)	47	Andrew Kurka	United States	1:24.11	–
2nd place, silver medalist(s)	41	Taiki Morii	Japan	1:25.75	+1.64
3rd place, bronze medalist(s)	45	Corey Peters	New Zealand	1:26.01	+1.90
4	42	Yohann Taberlet	France	1:26.23	+2.12
5	43	Roman Rabl	Austria	1:26.66	+2.55
6	53	Jesper Pedersen	Norway	1:26.82	+2.71
6	51	Frédéric François	France	1:26.82	+2.71
8	49	Kurt Oatway	Canada	1:27.50	+3.39
9	44	Takeshi Suzuki	Japan	1:27.53	+3.42
10	46	Georg Kreiter	Germany	1:28.23	+4.12
11	57	Sam Tait	Australia	1:28.56	+4.45
12	58	Han Sang-min	South Korea	1:30.61	+6.50
13	56	Nicolas Bisquertt Hudson	Chile	1:31.08	+6.97
14	40	Niels de Langen	Netherlands	1:31.40	+7.29
15	62	Igor Sikorski	Poland	1:31.69	+7.58
16	60	Lee Chi-won	South Korea	1:31.78	+7.67
17	65	Dino Sokolović	Croatia	1:32.20	+8.09
18	48	Stephen Lawler	United States	1:32.82	+8.71
19	61	Pavel Bambousek	Czech Republic	1:33.46	+9.35
20	63	Thomas Nolte	Germany	1:34.27	+10.16
	50	Christoph Kunz	Switzerland	DNF	
	52	Akira Kano	Japan	DNF	
	54	Jeroen Kampschreur	Netherlands	DNF	
	55	Kenji Natsume	Japan	DNF	
	59	Mark Soyer	Australia	DNF	
	64	Arly Velásquez	Mexico	DNF	

== See also ==
- Alpine skiing at the 2018 Winter Olympics
