= Alpine skiing at the 2018 Winter Paralympics – Men's super-G =

Men's super-G at the XII Paralympic Winter Games
- Paralympic alpine skiing
- Venue: Jeongseon Alpine Centre, South Korea
- Dates: 11 March 2018
- Competitors: 80 from 26 nations

Men's super-G (visually impaired) at the XII Paralympic Winter Games
- Competitors: 13 from 9 nations

Medalists
1st place, gold medalist(s)		Jakub Krako; Guide: Branislav Brozman	Slovakia
2nd place, silver medalist(s)		Giacomo Bertagnolli; Guide: Fabrizio Casal	Italy
3rd place, bronze medalist(s)		Miroslav Haraus; Guide: Maroš Hudík	Slovakia

Men's super-G (standing) at the XII Paralympic Winter Games
- Competitors: 34 from 17 nations

Medalists
1st place, gold medalist(s)		Theo Gmür	Switzerland
2nd place, silver medalist(s)		Arthur Bauchet	France
3rd place, bronze medalist(s)		Markus Salcher	Austria

Men's super-G (sitting) at the XII Paralympic Winter Games
- Competitors: 33 from 19 nations

Medalists
1st place, gold medalist(s)		Kurt Oatway	Canada
2nd place, silver medalist(s)		Andrew Kurka	United States
3rd place, bronze medalist(s)		Frédéric François	France

The men's super-G competition of the 2018 Winter Paralympics was held at Jeongseon Alpine Centre, South Korea. The competition took place on 11 March 2018.

== Visually impaired ==
In the downhill visually impaired, the athlete with a visual impairment has a sighted guide. The two skiers are considered a team, and dual medals are awarded.

The race was started at 11:02.

Rank	Bib	Name	Country	Time	Difference
1st place, gold medalist(s)	7	Jakub Krako; Guide: Branislav Brozman	Slovakia	1:26.11	
2nd place, silver medalist(s)	8	Giacomo Bertagnolli; Guide: Fabrizio Casal	Italy	1:26.29	+0.18
3rd place, bronze medalist(s)	5	Miroslav Haraus; Guide: Maroš Hudík	Slovakia	1:26.66	+0.55
4	10	Jon Santacana Maiztegui; Guide: Miguel Galindo Garcés	Spain	1:29.01	+2.90
5	1	Ivan Frantsev; Guide: German Agranovskii	Neutral Paralympic Athletes	1:29.30	+3.19
6	9	Valery Redkozubov; Guide: Evgeny Geroev	Neutral Paralympic Athletes	1:31.26	+5.15
7	4	Marek Kubačka; Guide: Mária Zatovičová	Slovakia	1:31.97	+5.86
8	2	Gernot Morgenfurt; Guide: Christoph Peter Gmeiner	Austria	1:32.14	+6.03
9	3	Kevin Burton; Guide: Brandon Ashby	United States	1:32.42	+6.31
10	13	Patrik Hetmer; Guide: Miroslav Máčala	Czech Republic	1:35.05	+8.94
11	12	Mark Bathum; Guide: Cade Yamamoto	United States	1:35.97	+9.86
12	11	Maciej Krężel; Guide: Anna Ograzyńska	Poland	1:38.14	+12.03
	6	Mac Marcoux; Guide: Jack Leitch	Canada	DNF	

== Standing ==
The race was started at 11:32.

Rank	Bib	Name	Country	Time	Difference
1st place, gold medalist(s)	22	Theo Gmür	Switzerland	1:24.83	
2nd place, silver medalist(s)	14	Arthur Bauchet	France	1:26.64	+1.81
3rd place, bronze medalist(s)	24	Markus Salcher	Austria	1:27.89	+3.06
4	17	Alexis Guimond	Canada	1:28.01	+3.18
5	32	Alexey Bugaev	Neutral Paralympic Athletes	1:28.47	+3.64
6	18	Martin France	Slovakia	1:28.66	+3.83
7	20	Kirk Schornstein	Canada	1:29.28	+4.45
8	33	Braydon Luscombe	Canada	1:29.39	+4.56
9	15	Thomas Pfyl	Switzerland	1:29.40	+4.57
10	19	Adam Hall	New Zealand	1:29.86	+5.03
11	21	Santeri Kiiveri	Finland	1:30.03	+5.20
12	23	Mitchell Gourley	Australia	1:30.34	+5.51
13	28	Thomas Walsh	United States	1:30.38	+5.55
14	30	Thomas Grochar	Austria	1:30.89	+6.06
15	27	Hiraku Misawa	Japan	1:31.04	+6.21
16	16	Jeffrey Stuut	Netherlands	1:31.08	+6.25
17	37	Jamie Stanton	United States	1:31.31	+6.48
18	25	Aaron Lindström	Sweden	1:31.77	+6.94
19	39	Alexander Alyabyev	Neutral Paralympic Athletes	1:31.83	+7.00
20	35	Jordan Broisin	France	1:32.57	+7.74
21	45	Michael Brügger	Switzerland	1:32.82	+7.99
22	31	James Whitley	Great Britain	1:32.96	+8.13
23	29	Roger Puig Davi	Andorra	1:32.97	+8.14
24	44	Andrew Haraghey	United States	1:34.19	+9.36
25	36	Chris Lloyd	Great Britain	1:34.43	+9.60
26	41	Alexey Mikushin	Neutral Paralympic Athletes	1:34.76	+9.93
27	46	Gakuta Koike	Japan	1:35.12	+10.29
28	42	Davide Bendotti	Italy	1:35.75	+10.92
29	47	Tomáš Vaverka	Czech Republic	1:36.22	+11.39
30	43	Miroslav Lidinský	Czech Republic	1:39.26	+14.43
	26	Robin Cuche	Switzerland	DNF	
	34	Nico Pajantschitsch	Austria	DNF	
	38	Martin Würz	Austria	DNF	
	40	Jonty O'Callaghan	Australia	DNF	

== Sitting ==
The race was started at 12:12.

Rank	Bib	Name	Country	Time	Difference
1st place, gold medalist(s)	63	Kurt Oatway	Canada	1:25.83	
2nd place, silver medalist(s)	60	Andrew Kurka	United States	1:26.89	+1.06
3rd place, bronze medalist(s)	53	Frédéric François	France	1:26.98	+1.15
4	52	Jesper Pedersen	Norway	1:27.10	+1.27
5	49	Akira Kano	Japan	1:27.45	+1.62
6	64	Yohann Taberlet	France	1:27.46	+1.63
7	59	Jeroen Kampschreur	Netherlands	1:27.63	+1.80
8	62	Taiki Morii	Japan	1:27.70	+1.87
9	61	Roman Rabl	Austria	1:28.14	+2.31
10	57	Igor Sikorski	Poland	1:28.41	+2.58
11	54	Corey Peters	New Zealand	1:28.80	+2.97
12	55	Tyler Walker	United States	1:29.10	+3.27
13	48	Takeshi Suzuki	Japan	1:29.41	+3.58
14	56	Niels de Langen	Netherlands	1:29.85	+4.02
15	66	Han Sang-min	South Korea	1:30.90	+5.07
16	68	Mark Soyer	Australia	1:32.32	+6.49
17	77	Arly Velásquez	Mexico	1:32.67	+6.84
18	71	Lee Chi-won	South Korea	1:33.35	+7.52
19	78	Dino Sokolović	Croatia	1:33.48	+7.65
20	79	Pavel Bambousek	Czech Republic	1:34.52	+8.69
21	76	Thomas Nolte	Germany	1:35.40	+9.57
22	72	Stephen Lawler	United States	1:38.33	+12.50
	50	Georg Kreiter	Germany	DNF	
	51	Christoph Kunz	Switzerland	DNF	
	58	Murat Pelit	Switzerland	DNF	
	65	Rene de Silvestro	Italy	DNF	
	67	Jasmin Bambur	United States	DNF	
	69	Simon Wallner	Austria	DNF	
	70	Kenji Natsume	Japan	DNF	
	73	Josh Elliott	United States	DNF	
	74	Nicolas Bisquertt Hudson	Chile	DNF	
	80	Sam Tait	Australia	DNF	
	75	Enrique Plantey	Argentina	DSQ	

== See also ==
- Alpine skiing at the 2018 Winter Olympics
