= United States at the 2018 Winter Paralympics =

- Flag of the United States
- IPC code: USA
- NPC: United States Olympic & Paralympic Committee
- Website: www.teamusa.org/US-Paralympics

in PyeongChang, South Korea
- Flag bearers: Mike Schultz (opening); Oksana Masters (closing)
- Medals Ranked 1st: Gold 13 Silver 15 Bronze 8 Total 36

Winter Paralympics appearances (overview)
- 1976; 1980; 1984; 1988; 1992; 1994; 1998; 2002; 2006; 2010; 2014; 2018; 2022; 2026

The United States competed at the 2018 Winter Paralympics in Pyeongchang, South Korea from 9 to 18 March 2018.

With 13 gold, 15 silver and 8 bronze medals, the US athletes had their best performance in 16 years and were the most successful national selection for the first time since 1994, ahead of the neutral athletes from Russia and the Canadian team. The most successful athlete within the US team was Oksana Masters with two gold, two silver and one bronze medal. Kendall Gretsch and Brenna Huckaby also each won two gold medals. With one gold, four silver and one bronze, David Cnossen was the most successful male US participant of the 2018 Paralympics.

== Medalists ==
Medals by sport
Sport	1st place, gold medalist(s)	2nd place, silver medalist(s)	3rd place, bronze medalist(s)	Total
Cross-country skiing	3	1	2	6
Snowboarding	5	5	3	13
Biathlon	2	4	1	7
Alpine skiing	1	2	1	4
Para ice hockey	1	0	0	1
Total	13	15	8	36

Medals by date
Day	Date	1st place, gold medalist(s)	2nd place, silver medalist(s)	3rd place, bronze medalist(s)	Total
1	March 10	3	1	1	5
2	March 11	1	2	1	4
3	March 12	2	2	2	6
4	March 13	0	1	1	2
5	March 14	2	1	1	4
6	March 15	0	0	0	0
7	March 16	3	5	1	9
8	March 17	1	3	1	5
9	March 18	1	0	0	1
Total		13	15	8	36

Medals by gender
Gender	1st place, gold medalist(s)	2nd place, silver medalist(s)	3rd place, bronze medalist(s)	Total	Percentage
Female	5	4	3	12	40%
Male	6	8	4	18	60%
Mixed	0	0	0	0	0.0%
Total	13	15	8	36	100%

Multiple medalists
Name	Sport(s)	1st place, gold medalist(s)	2nd place, silver medalist(s)	3rd place, bronze medalist(s)	Total
Daniel Cnossen	Biathlon, Cross-country skiing	1	3	1	5
Oksana Masters	Biathlon, Cross-country skiing	1	2	1	4
Kendall Gretsch	Biathlon, Cross-country skiing	2	0	0	2
Brenna Huckaby	Snowboarding	2	0	0	2
Andrew Kurka	Alpine skiing	1	1	0	2
Mike Schultz	Snowboarding	1	1	0	2
Noah Elliott	Snowboarding	1	0	1	2
Mike Minor	Snowboarding	1	0	1	2
Andrew Soule	Biathlon, Cross-country skiing	1	0	1	2
Amy Purdy	Snowboarding	0	1	1	2

Medal	Name	Sport	Event	Date
Gold	Andrew Kurka	Alpine skiing	Men's downhill, sitting	March 10
Gold	Daniel Cnossen	Biathlon	Men's 7.5 km, sitting	March 10
Gold	Kendall Gretsch	Biathlon	Women's 6 km, sitting	March 10
Gold	Kendall Gretsch	Cross-country skiing	Women's 12 km, sitting	March 11
Gold	Mike Schultz	Snowboarding	Men's snowboard cross SB-LL1	March 12
Gold	Brenna Huckaby	Snowboarding	Women's snowboard cross SB-LL1	March 12
Gold	Andrew Soule	Cross-country skiing	Men's 1.5 km sprint classical, sitting	March 14
Gold	Oksana Masters	Cross-country skiing	Women's 1.5 km sprint classical, sitting	March 14
Gold	Noah Elliott	Snowboarding	Men's banked slalom SB-LL1	March 16
Gold	Mike Minor	Snowboarding	Men's banked slalom SB-UL	March 16
Gold	Brenna Huckaby	Snowboarding	Women's banked slalom SB-LL1	March 16
Gold	Oksana Masters	Cross-country skiing	Women's 5 km, sitting	March 17
Gold	United States men's national ice sledge hockey team: Ralph DeQuebec; Brody Roybal; Billy Hanning Jr.; Jack Wallace; Travis Dodson; Tyler Carron; Luke McDermott; Nikko Landeros; Declan Farmer; Adam Page; Noah Grove; Rico Roman; Josh Misiewicz; Josh Pauls; Jen Lee; Steve Cash; Kevin McKee	Para ice hockey	Para ice hockey	March 18
Silver	Oksana Masters	Biathlon	Women's 6 km, sitting	March 10
Silver	Andrew Kurka	Alpine skiing	Men's super-G, sitting	March 11
Silver	Daniel Cnossen	Cross-country skiing	Men's 15 km, sitting	March 11
Silver	Keith Gabel	Snowboarding	Men's snowboard cross SB-LL2	March 12
Silver	Amy Purdy	Snowboarding	Women's snowboard cross SB-LL1	March 12
Silver	Daniel Cnossen	Biathlon	Men's 12.5 km, sitting	March 13
Silver	Tyler Walker	Alpine skiing	Men's giant slalom, sitting	March 14
Silver	Daniel Cnossen	Biathlon	Men's 15 km, sitting	March 16
Silver	Oksana Masters	Biathlon	Women's 12.5 km, sitting	March 16
Silver	Mike Schultz	Snowboarding	Men's banked slalom SB-LL1	March 16
Silver	Evan Strong	Snowboarding	Men's banked slalom SB-LL2	March 16
Silver	Brittani Coury	Snowboarding	Women's banked slalom SB-LL2	March 16
Silver	Jake Adicoff; Guide: Sawyer Kesselheim	Cross-country skiing	Men's 10 km, visually impaired	March 17
Silver	Daniel Cnossen	Cross-country skiing	Men's 10 km, sitting	March 17
Silver	Tyler Walker	Alpine skiing	Men's slalom, sitting	March 17
Bronze	Laurie Stephens	Alpine skiing	Women's downhill, sitting	March 10
Bronze	Oksana Masters	Cross-country skiing	Women's 12 km, sitting	March 11
Bronze	Noah Elliott	Snowboarding	Men's snowboard cross SB-LL1	March 12
Bronze	Mike Minor	Snowboarding	Men's snowboard cross SB-UL	March 12
Bronze	Andrew Soule	Biathlon	Men's 12.5 km, sitting	March 13
Bronze	Daniel Cnossen	Cross-country skiing	Men's 1.5 km sprint classical	March 14
Bronze	Amy Purdy	Snowboarding	Women's banked slalom SB-LL1	March 16
Bronze	Jamie Stanton	Alpine skiing	Men's slalom, standing	March 17

== Alpine skiing ==
Men
Sitting

Athlete	Event	Class	Run 1	Run 2	Total	
Athlete	Event	Class	Run 1	Run 2	Time	Rank
Jasmin Bambur	Super-G	LW11	DNF	—N/a	DNF	
Jasmin Bambur	Giant slalom	LW11	1:13.52	DNF		
Jasmin Bambur	Slalom	LW11	DNF			
Jasmin Bambur	Super combined	LW11	1:31.53	53.69	2:25.22	12
Josh Elliott	Super-G	LW12-2	DNF	—N/a	DNF	
Josh Elliott	Giant slalom	LW12-2	DNF			
Josh Elliott	Slalom	LW12-2	DNF			
Josh Elliott	Super combined	LW12-2	1:27.10	50.58	2:17.68	6
Andrew Kurka	Downhill	LW12-1	1:24.11	—N/a	1:24.11	1st place, gold medalist(s)
Andrew Kurka	Super-G	LW12-1	1:26.89	—N/a	1:26.89	2nd place, silver medalist(s)
Andrew Kurka	Giant slalom	LW12-1	DNF			
Andrew Kurka	Super combined	LW12-1	1:27.17	50.56	2:17.73	7
Stephen Lawler	Downhill	LW12-1	1:32.82	—N/a	1:32.82	18
Stephen Lawler	Super-G	LW12-1	1:38.33	—N/a	1:38.33	22
Stephen Lawler	Giant slalom	LW12-1	1:17.20	DNF		
Tyler Walker	Super-G	LW12-1	1:29.10	—N/a	1:29.10	12
Tyler Walker	Giant slalom	LW12-1	1:06.30	1:07.49	2:13.79	2nd place, silver medalist(s)
Tyler Walker	Slalom	LW12-1	49.08	51.47	1:40.55	2nd place, silver medalist(s)
Tyler Walker	Super combined	LW12-1	1:27.27	DNF		

Standing

Athlete	Event	Class	Run 1	Run 2	Total	
Athlete	Event	Class	Run 1	Run 2	Time	Rank
Tyler Carter	Giant slalom	LW4	1:15.23	DNF		
Tyler Carter	Slalom	LW4	1:02.22	1:01.08	2:03.30	19
Andrew Haraghey	Downhill	LW1	1:32.84	—N/a	1:32.84	18
Andrew Haraghey	Super-G	LW1	1:34.19	—N/a	1:34.19	24
Connor Hogan	Giant slalom	LW9-1	1:15.90	1:16.57	2:32.47	24
Connor Hogan	Slalom	LW9-1	1:02.59	DNS		
Jamie Stanton	Super-G	LW4	1:02.59	—N/a	1:31.31	17
Jamie Stanton	Giant slalom	LW4	1:09.44	1:11.86	2:21.30	14
Jamie Stanton	Slalom	LW4	48.51	48.86	1:37.37	3rd place, bronze medalist(s)
Jamie Stanton	Super combined	LW4	1:29.80	46.75	2:16.55	4
Thomas Walsh	Super-G	LW4	1:30.38	—N/a	1:30.38	13
Thomas Walsh	Giant slalom	LW4	1:08.92	1:07.39	2:16.31	7
Thomas Walsh	Slalom	LW4	49.33	52.87	1:42.20	5
Thomas Walsh	Super combined	LW4	1:29.13	DNF		
Spencer Wood	Giant slalom	LW4	1:16.45	1:16.54	2:32.99	25
Spencer Wood	Slalom	LW4	1:00.39	DNF		

Visually Impaired

Athlete	Event	Class	Run 1	Run 2	Total	
Athlete	Event	Class	Run 1	Run 2	Time	Rank
Mark Bathum; Guide: Cade Yamamoto	Downhill	B3	DNF	—N/a	DNF	
Mark Bathum; Guide: Cade Yamamoto	Super-G	B3	1:35.97	—N/a	1:35.97	11
Mark Bathum; Guide: Cade Yamamoto	Giant slalom	B3	DSQ			
Mark Bathum; Guide: Cade Yamamoto	Super combined	B3	1:34.64	53.00	2:27.64	7
Kevin Burton; Guide: Brandon Powel-Ashby	Downhill	B2	1:31.35	—N/a	1:31.35	7
Kevin Burton; Guide: Brandon Powel-Ashby	Super-G	B2	1:32.42	—N/a	1:32.42	9
Kevin Burton; Guide: Brandon Powel-Ashby	Slalom	B2	54.18	DNF		
Kevin Burton; Guide: Brandon Powel-Ashby	Super combined	B2	1:31.13	51.23	2:22.36	5

Women
Sitting

Athlete	Event	Class	Run 1	Run 2	Total	
Athlete	Event	Class	Run 1	Run 2	Time	Rank
Laurie Stephens	Downhill	LW12-1	1:35.80	—N/a	1:35.80	3rd place, bronze medalist(s)
Laurie Stephens	Super-G	LW12-1	1:36.98	—N/a	1:36.98	5
Laurie Stephens	Giant slalom	LW12-1	1:18.92	1:12.93	2:31.85	7
Laurie Stephens	Slalom	LW12-1	1:08.89	1:06.33	2:15.22	5
Laurie Stephens	Super combined	LW12-1	1:33.06	1:02.68	2:35.74	4

Standing

Athlete	Event	Class	Run 1	Run 2	Total	
Athlete	Event	Class	Run 1	Run 2	Time	Rank
Stephanie Jallen	Downhill	LW9-1	1:40.64	—N/a	1:40.64	8
Stephanie Jallen	Super-G	LW9-1	1:44.30	—N/a	1:44.30	10
Stephanie Jallen	Giant slalom	LW9-1	1:21.26	1:16.17	2:37.43	10
Stephanie Jallen	Slalom	LW9-1	DNF			
Stephanie Jallen	Super combined	LW9-1	1:40.40	57.35	2:37.75	5
Ally Kunkel	Downhill	LW6/8-2	DNF	—N/a	DNF	
Ally Kunkel	Super-G	LW6/8-2	1:40.74	—N/a	1:40.74	7
Ally Kunkel	Giant slalom	LW6/8-2	1:17.86	1:16.72	2:34.58	8
Ally Kunkel	Slalom	LW6/8-2	DSQ			
Ally Kunkel	Super combined	LW6/8-2	1:40.68	DNF		
Melanie Schwartz	Downhill	LW2	1:39.38	—N/a	1:39.38	7
Melanie Schwartz	Super-G	LW2	1:42.77	—N/a	1:42.77	8
Melanie Schwartz	Slalom	LW2	1:11.72	1:13.66	2:25.38	11
Melanie Schwartz	Super combined	LW2	1:39.78	1:09.54	2:49.32	8

Visually Impaired

Athlete	Event	Class	Run 1	Run 2	Total	
Athlete	Event	Class	Run 1	Run 2	Time	Rank
Staci Mannella; Guide: Sadie De Baun
Staci Mannella; Guide: Sadie De Baun	Super-G	B3	1:44.25	—N/a	1:44.25	10
Staci Mannella; Guide: Sadie De Baun	Giant slalom	B3	1:21.78	1:18.23	2:40.01	10
Staci Mannella; Guide: Sadie De Baun	Slalom	B3	1:04.33	1:02.80	2:07.13	9
Staci Mannella; Guide: Sadie De Baun	Super combined	B3	DNF			
Danelle Umstead; Guide: Rob Umstead	Downhill	B2	DNF	—N/a	DNF	
Danelle Umstead; Guide: Rob Umstead	Super-G	B2	1:38.91	—N/a	1:38.91	6
Danelle Umstead; Guide: Rob Umstead	Giant slalom	B2	1:19.36	1:17.93	2:37.29	8
Danelle Umstead; Guide: Rob Umstead	Slalom	B2	DSQ			
Danelle Umstead; Guide: Rob Umstead	Super combined	B2	1:37.70	1:01.83	2:39.53	8

== Biathlon ==
Men
Sitting

Athlete	Event	Class	Factor	Time	Misses	Factored Time	Rank
Daniel Cnossen	7.5 km	LW12	100 %	23:49.7	1 (0+1)	23:49.7	1st place, gold medalist(s)
Aaron Pike	7.5 km	LW11.5	96 %	27:20.9	3 (3+0)	26:15.3	12
Bryan Price	7.5 km	LW11.5	96 %	30:05.0	1 (1+0)	28:52.8	20
Andy Soule	7.5 km	LW12	100 %	25:08.3	3 (3+0)	25:08.3	8
Jeremy Wagner	7.5 km	LW11.5	96 %	29:43.8	1 (1+0)	28:32.4	19
Daniel Cnossen	12.5 km	LW12	100%	46:37.3	0 (0+0+0+0)	46:37.3	2nd place, silver medalist(s)
Sean Halstead	12.5 km	LW11.5	96%	58:05.3	5 (2+0+1+2)	55:45.9	14
Aaron Pike	12.5 km	LW11.5	96%	53:07.7	1 (0+0+0+1)	51:00.2	7
Bryan Price	12.5 km	LW11.5	96 %	1:04:31.9	10 (3+1+2+4)	1:01:57.0	16
Andy Soule	12.5 km	LW12	100 %	47:08.7	2 (0+0+2+0)	47:08.7	3rd place, bronze medalist(s)

Standing

Athlete	Event	Class	Factor	Time	Misses	Factored Time	Rank
Ruslan Reiter	7.5 km	LW8	96 %	23:52.9	4 (2+2)	22:55.6	16
Ruslan Reiter	12.5 km	LW8	96 %	45:35.3	4 (0+2+1+1)	43:45.9	11

Women Sitting

Athlete	Event	Class	Factor	Time	Misses	Factored Time	Rank
Kendall Gretsch	6 km	LW11.5	96 %	22:46.7	1 (0+1)	21:52.0	1st place, gold medalist(s)
Oksana Masters	6 km	LW12	100 %	22:14.8	0 (0+0)	22:14.8	2nd place, silver medalist(s)
Joy Rondeau	6 km	LW11.5	96 %	28:59.0	0 (0+0)	27:49.4	14
Kendall Gretsch	10 km	LW11.5	96 %	46:28.5	3 (1+0+0+2)	44:37.0	4
Oksana Masters	10 km	LW12	100 %	DNF			
Oksana Masters	12.5km	LW12	100 %	50:00.0	0 (0+0+0+0)	50:00.0	2nd place, silver medalist(s)

== Cross-country skiing ==
Men
Sitting

Athlete	Event	Class	Factor	Time	Factored Time	Rank
Daniel Cnossen	15 km	LW12	100 %	42:20.7	42:20.7	2nd place, silver medalist(s)
Daniel Cnossen	1.5 km					3rd place, bronze medalist(s)
Sean Halstead	15 km	LW11.5	96 %	50:39.6	48:38.0	22
Andrew Soule	15 km	LW12	100%	44:36.9	44:36.9	11
Andrew Soule	1.5 km					1st place, gold medalist(s)

Visually Impaired

Athlete	Event	Class	Factor	Time		Factored Time		Rank	
Jake Adicoff; Guide: Sawyer Kesselheim	20 km 1.5 km	B3	100%	49:43.0		49:43.0		5	
Jake Adicoff; Guide: Sawyer Kesselheim	20 km 1.5 km	B3	100%	Seeding		Semifinal		Final	
Jake Adicoff; Guide: Sawyer Kesselheim	20 km 1.5 km	B3	100%	Time	Rank	Time	Rank	Time	Rank
Jake Adicoff; Guide: Sawyer Kesselheim	20 km 1.5 km	B3	100%	3:42.13	3	4:10.3	2	RAL	

Women
Sitting

Athlete	Event	Class	Factor	Time		Factored Time		Rank	
Kendall Gretsch	12 km	LW11.5	96 %	39:51.6		38:15.9		1st place, gold medalist(s)	
Oksana Masters	12 km 5km 1.5 km	LW12	100%	39:04.9		39:04.9		3rd place, bronze medalist(s)	
Oksana Masters	12 km 5km 1.5 km	LW12	100%	16:42.0		16.42.0		1st place, gold medalist(s)	
Oksana Masters	12 km 5km 1.5 km	LW12	100%	Seeding		Semifinal		Final	
Oksana Masters	12 km 5km 1.5 km	LW12	100%	Time	Rank	Time	Rank	Time	Rank
Oksana Masters	12 km 5km 1.5 km	LW12	100%	3:29.86	1	4:24.3	1	4:06.7	1st place, gold medalist(s)

Standing

Athlete	Event	Class	Factor	Time	Factored Time	Rank
Grace Miller	15 km	LW8	96%	1:11:43.6	1:08:51.5	10

Visually Impaired

Athlete	Event	Class	Factor	Time	Factored Time	Rank
Mia Zutter; Guide: Kristina Trygstad-Saari	15 km	B3	100 %	1:02:20.2	1:02:20.2	8

== Snowboarding ==
The World Para Snowboard World Cup Finals in Big White, British Columbia took place in February 2018. The event was the final one used to decide who would represent the United States at the 2018 Games. To be eligible to represent the United States at the Paralympic Games, American snowboarders had to get season race points in at least one race in the 2017-18 season. The deadline to get the points was 19 February 2018. On February 20, the names of the U.S. Paralympic Snowboarding Team were made public.

Snowboard cross
Men

Athlete	Event	Seeding						1/8 final	Quarterfinal	Semifinal	Final	
Athlete	Event	Run 1		Run 2		Best	Seed	1/8 final	Quarterfinal	Semifinal	Final	
Athlete	Event	Time	Rank	Time	Rank	Best	Seed	Position	Position	Position	Position	Rank
Noah Elliot	Snowboard cross, SB-LL1	1:00.73	1	—N/a		1:00.73	1 Q	1	1	2	1	3rd place, bronze medalist(s)
Mark Mann	Snowboard cross, SB-LL1	1:04.58	4	—N/a		1:04.58	4 q	1	2	Did not advance		
Mike Schultz	Snowboard cross, SB-LL1	1:04.73	5	—N/a		1:04.73	5 q	1	1	1	1	1st place, gold medalist(s)
Keith Gabel	Snowboard cross, SB-LL2	59.02	4	1:00.55	4	59.02	4 Q	1	1	1	2	2nd place, silver medalist(s)
Mike Shea	Snowboard cross, SB-LL2	58.93	3	58.97	1	58.93	3 Q	1	2	Did not advance		
Evan Strong	Snowboard cross, SB-LL2	1:01.38	7	59.40	3	59.40	6 Q	1	1	2	2	4
Mike Minor	Snowboard cross, SB-UL	1:00.12	1	1:02.11	3	1:00.12	1 Q	1	1	2	1	3rd place, bronze medalist(s)
James Sides	Snowboard cross, SB-UL	1:06.60	12	1:06.47	13	1:06.47	15 Q	2	Did not advance			
Micheal Spivey	Snowboard cross, SB-UL	1:08.87	16	1:08.33	16	1:08.33	18	Did not advance				

Women

Athlete	Event	Seeding						Quarterfinal	Semifinal	Final	
Athlete	Event	Run 1		Run 2		Best	Seed	Quarterfinal	Semifinal	Final	
Athlete	Event	Time	Rank	Time	Rank	Best	Seed	Position	Position	Position	Rank
Brenna Huckaby	Snowboard cross, SB-LL1	1:17.42	3	1:17.02	4	1:17.02	4 Q	—N/a	1	1	1st place, gold medalist(s)
Amy Purdy	Snowboard cross, SB-LL1	1:09.64	1	1:10.41	2	1:09.64	2 Q	—N/a	1	2	2nd place, silver medalist(s)
Nicole Roundy	Snowboard cross, SB-LL1	1:22.46	4	1:17.77	5	1:17.77	5	—N/a	Did not advance		
Brittani Coury	Snowboard cross, SB-LL2	1:26.39	6	—N/a		1:26.39	6 q	2	Did not advance		

== Para ice hockey ==
The USA could play at the 2018 Paralympics after it won competitions in 2017, before the Games started.

The United States national sledge hockey team played in several tournaments and friendly games to get ready for the Winter Paralympics. The team played in the December 2017 World Sled Hockey Challenge in Charlottetown, Prince Edward Island. They played in the Para Ice Hockey International Tournament in Turin, Italy in January 2018. They also played in the 2018 Border Series in Buffalo, New York and Pt. Colborne, Ontario in February 2018.

Roster

Head coach: Guy Gosselin Assistant coach: David Hoff, General Manager: Dan Brennan, Team doctor: Michael Uihein Team physiotherapist: Mike Cortese Team equipment manager: Scott Aldrich Team media officer: Scott Aldrich

No.	Pos.	Name	Height	Weight	Birthdate	Birthplace	2017–18 team
3	D	Ralph DeQuebec	5 ft 10 in (178 cm)	185 lb (84 kg)	March 24, 1983	San Pedro, California	Colorado Avalanche
4	F	Brody Roybal	3 ft 1 in (94 cm)	120 lb (54 kg)	May 25, 1998	Northlake, Illinois	Chicago Blackhawks
5	D	Bill Hanning Jr.	5 ft 10 in (178 cm)	160 lb (73 kg)	April 18, 1985	High Ridge, Missouri	St. Louis Blues
8	F	Jack Wallace	6 ft 4 in (193 cm)	210 lb (95 kg)	June 24, 1998	Franklin Lakes, New Jersey	NJ Freeze
9	F	Dodson Travsis	4 ft 0 in (122 cm)	150 lb (68 kg)	October 14, 1985	Deming, New Mexico	Chicago Blackhawks
11	D	Tyler Carron	6 ft 0 in (183 cm)	165 lb (75 kg)	November 5, 1989	Fort Collins, Colorado	Colorado Avalanche
13	D	Luke McDermott	5 ft 7 in (170 cm)	155 lb (70 kg)	September 1, 1987	Westerlo, New York	Buffalo Sabres
15	D	Nikko Landeros	6 ft 1 in (185 cm)	185 lb (84 kg)	April 28, 1980	Johnstown, Colorado	Colorado Avalanche
16	F	Declan Farmer	6 ft 0 in (183 cm)	135 lb (61 kg)	November 5, 1997	Tampa, Florida	Tampa Bay Lightning
20	F	Adam Page	5 ft 6 in (168 cm)	170 lb (77 kg)	March 10, 1992	Lancaster, New York	Buffalo Sabres
22	F	Noah Grove	5 ft 8 in (173 cm)	135 lb (61 kg)	May 1, 1999	Frederick, Maryland	Boston Bruins
23	F	Rico Roman	5 ft 9 in (175 cm)	180 lb (82 kg)	February 4, 1981	Portland, Oregon	Colorado Avalanche
24	F	Josh Misiewicz	6 ft 0 in (183 cm)	170 lb (77 kg)	June 25, 1988	La Grange, Illinois	Chicago Blackhawks
27	D	Josh Pauls	5 ft 8 in (173 cm)	135 lb (61 kg)	December 31, 1992	Green Brook, New Jersey	St. Louis Blues
32	G	Jen Lee	6 ft 2 in (188 cm)	190 lb (86 kg)	July 26, 1986	San Francisco, California	Chicago Blackhawks
34	G	Steve Cash	5 ft 7 in (170 cm)	150 lb (68 kg)	May 9, 1989	Overland, Missouri	St. Louis Blues
88	F	Kevin McKee	4 ft 7 in (140 cm)	115 lb (52 kg)	February 11, 1990	Chicago, Illinois	Chicago Blackhawks

Summary

Key: * OT – Overtime * GWS – Match decided by penalty-shootout

Team	Event	Group stage				Semifinal / Pl.	Final / BM / Pl.	
Team	Event	Opposition Score	Opposition Score	Opposition Score	Rank	Opposition Score	Opposition Score	Rank
United States men's	Sledge hockey tournament	Japan; W 10–0	Czech Republic; W 10–0	South Korea; W 8–0	1 QS	Italy; W 10–1	Canada; W 2–1	1st place, gold medalist(s)

Preliminary round

Pos	Team	Pld	W	OTW	OTL	L	GF	GA	GD	Pts	Qualification
1	United States	3	3	0	0	0	28	0	+28	9	Semifinals
2	South Korea (H)	3	1	1	0	1	7	11	−4	5	Semifinals
3	Czech Republic	3	1	0	1	1	5	13	−8	4	5–8th place semifinals
4	Japan	3	0	0	0	3	1	17	−16	0	5–8th place semifinals

Source: PyeongChang 2018
(H) Host

11 March 2018; 12:00	United States	10–0 (3–0, 6–0, 1–0)	Japan	Gangneung Hockey Centre; Attendance: 5,435

Game reference

Jen Lee
Goalies
Shinobu Fukushima
Kazuya Mochizuki
Referee:
(Austria) Kristijan Nikolic
Linesmen:
(Canada) Matt Clark
(South Korea) Han Youl

McKee (Landeros) – 01:01	1–0
Roybal (Misiewicz) – 04:34	2–0
Grove (Farmer, DeQuebec) – 12:26	3–0
Landeros (Roybal, Farmer) (PP) – 20:25	4–0
Farmer – 20:55	5–0
McDermott (Page, DeQuebec) – 23:20	6–0
Roman (Page, Pauls) – 23:54	7–0
Roybal (Misiewicz) – 24:02	8–0
Roybal (McKee, Misiewicz) – 24:49	9–0
Wallace (Farmer, Pauls) – 38:25	10–0

2 min
Penalties
4 min
24
Shots
2

12 March 2018; 12:00	United States	10–0 (3–0, 7–0, 0–0)	Czech Republic	Gangneung Hockey Centre; Attendance: 5,709

Game reference

Steve Cash
Goalies
Martin Kuděla
Referee:
(Norway) Owe Lüthcke
Linesmen:
(Canada) Matthew Fergenbaum
(Austria) David Nothegger

Roybal (Landeros) – 01:04	1–0
Farmer (Wallace, Page) – 08:17	2–0
Farmer (McKee, Pauls) (PP) – 12:05	3–0
Farmer (Page, Wallace) (PP) – 18:39	4–0
Wallace (Farmer, Page) – 21:45	5–0
Roybal (Misiewicz, McKee) – 24:46	6–0
Dodson (Hanning) – 27:21	7–0
Farmer (Landeros, Carron) (PP) – 28:22	8–0
Roybal (Misiewicz) – 28:47	9–0
Dodson (Landeros) – 29:42	10–0

4 min
Penalties
8 min
31
Shots
13

13 March 2018; 12:00	United States	8–0 (6–0, 0–0, 2–0)	South Korea	Gangneung Hockey Centre; Attendance: 6,588

Game reference

Steve Cash
Goalies
Yu Man-gyun
Lee Jae-woong
Referee:
(Canada) Kevin Webinger
Linesmen:
(Canada) Matt Clark
(Canada) Matthew Fergenbaum

Roybal (Farmer, Landeros) (PP) – 04:51	1–0
Farmer (Wallace, DeQuebec) – 06:40	2–0
Misiewicz (Pauls, Landeros) (PP) – 08:09	3–0
Misiewicz (McKee, Roybal) – 09:57	4–0
Farmer (Roybal) (SH) – 12:27	5–0
Farmer (Roybal, Carron) (SH)– 13:37	6–0
Dodson (Carron, Roman) – 33:36	7–0
Roybal (McKee) – 40:07	8–0

8 min
Penalties
12 min
24
Shots
4

Semi-finals

15 March 2018; 20:00	United States	10–1 (5–0, 3–0, 2–1)	Italy	Gangneung Hockey Centre; Attendance: 4,889

Game reference

Steve Cash
Jen Lee
Goalies
Gabriele Araudo
Santino Stillitano
Referee:
(Canada) Kevin Webinger
Linesmen:
(South Korea) Chae Young-jin
(Canada) Matt Clark

Grove (Landeros) – 03:23	1–0
Misiewicz (Pauls, Roybal) – 03:58	2–0
Roybal (Pauls, Misiewicz) – 04:09	3–0
Landeros (PP) – 13:50	4–0
McDermott (Grove) – 14:56	5–0
Roybal (Misiewicz) (PP) – 22:52	6–0
Landeros (Carron, Farmer) – 23:35	7–0
Farmer (Page, Pauls) – 27:44	8–0
McKee (Grove, Page) – 33:32	9–0
	9–1	38:30 – Corvino (Depaoli) (PP)
Landeros (Roybal, Hanning) (PP) – 42:03	10–1

16 min
Penalties
14 min
33
Shots
4

Gold medal game

18 March 2018; 12:00	Canada	1–2 OT (1–0, 0–0, 0–1) (OT: 0–1)	United States	Gangneung Hockey Centre; Attendance: 6,096

Game reference

Dominic Larocque
Goalies
Steve Cash
Referee:
(Austria) Kristijan Nikolic
Linesmen:
(Sweden) Andreas Lundén
(Austria) David Nothegger

Bridges (Delaney, Hickey) – 12:06	1–0
	1–1	44:22 – Farmer (McKee, Roybal) (EA)
	1–2	48:30 – Farmer (Pauls)

4 min
Penalties
2 min
12
Shots
16

== Wheelchair curling ==
Summary

Team	Event	Group stage												Tiebreaker	Semifinal	Final / BM	
Team	Event	Opposition Score	Opposition Score	Opposition Score	Opposition Score	Opposition Score	Opposition Score	Opposition Score	Opposition Score	Opposition Score	Opposition Score	Opposition Score	Rank	Opposition Score	Opposition Score	Opposition Score	Rank
Kirk Black; Steve Emt; Justin Marshall; Penny Greely; Meghan Lino	Mixed	KOR; L 3–8	GER; L 4–6	SWE; W 10–2	FIN; L 5–8	(International Paralympic Committee) NPA; L 4–6	CHN; L 4–6	CAN; L 5–6	SUI; L 4–7	GBR; W 9–3	NOR; L 4–5	SVK; L 6–7	12	Did not advance			

The national team first decided who might be part of the national team in September 2017 in Incheon, South Korea. The second time when the national team said some people may not be able to go was at an event in Green Bay, Wisconsin in October 2017. The final choice of who would be on Team USA for the 2018 Games was made at USA National Team event in Wausau, Wisconsin in early November 2017.

Before the Games started, American wheelchair curlers had a few important dates in preparation for the Games. These included the U.S. Open in Utica, New York in December 2017, the Kisakallio Cup in Kisakallio, Finland in January 2018, and Sochi Open in January 2018.

Round robin standings

Pos	Team	Pld	W	L	PF	PA	PD	PCT	Ends Won	Ends Lost	Blank Ends	Stolen Ends	Shot %	Qualification
1	South Korea	11	9	2	65	51	14	0.818	38	36	9	11	66%	Advance to playoffs
2	Canada	11	9	2	74	45	29	0.818	47	28	6	27	62%	Advance to playoffs
3	China	11	9	2	85	42	43	0.818	43	32	2	16	67%	Advance to playoffs
4	Norway	11	7	4	55	57	−2	0.636	41	35	5	15	58%	Advance to playoffs
5	Neutral Paralympic Athletes	11	5	6	61	63	−2	0.455	44	37	2	23	62%	
6	Switzerland	11	5	6	56	63	−7	0.455	36	45	2	11	61%	
7	Great Britain	11	5	6	57	53	4	0.455	41	41	6	20	62%	
8	Germany	11	5	6	57	68	−11	0.455	37	39	5	16	54%	
9	Slovakia	11	4	7	62	72	−10	0.364	39	46	1	11	57%	
10	Sweden	11	4	7	47	66	−19	0.364	29	45	8	8	57%	
11	Finland	11	2	9	53	87	−34	0.182	35	46	1	11	51%	
12	United States	11	2	9	58	63	−5	0.182	37	45	3	12	60%	

Source: Paralympic.org

Results

United States has a bye in draws 2, 4, 6, 9, 14 and 16.

Draw 1

Saturday, 10 March, 14:35

Sheet C	1	2	3	4	5	6	7	8	Final
United States (Black) 🔨	0	0	0	1	0	0	2	X	3
South Korea (Seo)	0	1	1	0	4	1	0	X	8

Draw 3

Sunday, 11 March, 9:35

Sheet B	1	2	3	4	5	6	7	8	Final
United States (Black) 🔨	0	3	0	0	0	0	0	X	4
Germany (Putzich)	0	0	2	2	1	1	0	X	6

Draw 5

Sunday, 11 March, 19:35

Sheet D	1	2	3	4	5	6	7	8	Final
United States (Black) 🔨	2	2	1	1	0	2	2	X	10
Sweden (Petersson Dahl)	0	0	0	0	2	0	0	X	2

Draw 7

Monday, 12 March, 14:35

Sheet C	1	2	3	4	5	6	7	8	Final
Finland (S. Karjalainen) 🔨	0	0	4	0	1	0	1	2	8
United States (Black)	1	1	0	2	0	1	0	0	5

Draw 8

Monday, 12 March, 19:35

Sheet B	1	2	3	4	5	6	7	8	Final
Neutral Paralympic Athletes (Kurokhtin)	1	1	1	1	1	0	0	1	6
United States (Black) 🔨	0	0	0	0	0	3	1	0	4

Draw 10

Tuesday, 13 March, 14:35

Sheet A	1	2	3	4	5	6	7	8	Final
United States (Black)	0	1	1	0	1	0	1	0	4
China (Wang) 🔨	1	0	0	1	0	2	0	2	6

Draw 11

Tuesday, 13 March, 19:35

Sheet B	1	2	3	4	5	6	7	8	EE	Final
Canada (Ideson)	0	0	1	1	1	1	0	1	1	6
United States (Black) 🔨	2	1	0	0	0	0	2	0	0	5

Draw 12

Wednesday, 14 March, 9:35

Sheet D	1	2	3	4	5	6	7	8	Final
Switzerland (Wagner)	0	2	1	0	1	0	1	2	7
United States (Black) 🔨	1	0	0	1	0	2	0	0	4

Draw 13

Wednesday, 14 March, 14:35

Sheet A	1	2	3	4	5	6	7	8	Final
Great Britain (Neilson) 🔨	0	1	0	0	1	0	1	X	3
United States (Black)	1	0	3	2	0	3	0	X	9

Draw 15

Thursday, 15 March, 9:35

Sheet C	1	2	3	4	5	6	7	8	Final
United States (Black) 🔨	0	1	1	0	0	2	0	0	4
Norway (Lorentsen)	1	0	0	2	1	0	0	1	5

Draw 17

Thursday, 15 March, 19:35

Sheet D	1	2	3	4	5	6	7	8	Final
United States (Black) 🔨	1	0	2	0	1	0	2	0	6
Slovakia (Ďuriš)	0	1	0	3	0	1	0	2	7

== See also ==
- United States at the 2018 Winter Olympics
