= Alpine skiing at the 2018 Winter Paralympics =

Alpine skiing at the XII Paralympic Winter Games
- Venue: Jeongseon Alpine Centre, South Korea
- Dates: 10–18 March

Alpine skiing at the 2018 Winter Paralympics was held at the Jeongseon Alpine Centre, South Korea. The thirty events occurred from 10 to 18 March 2018.

== Events ==
The competition events are:

- Downhill (sitting, standing, visually impaired): women – men
- Super-G (sitting, standing, visually impaired): women – men
- Giant slalom (sitting, standing, visually impaired): women – men
- Slalom (sitting, standing, visually impaired): women – men
- Super combined (sitting, standing, visually impaired): women – men

== Competition schedule ==
The following is the competition schedule for all thirty events.

All times are local (UTC+9).

Date	Time	Event
10 March	09:30	Women's downhill
10 March	10:47	Men's downhill
11 March	09:30	Women's Super-G
11 March	11:02	Men's Super-G
13 March	9:30	Women's super combined
13 March	11:15	Men's super combined
13 March	15:00	Women's super combined
13 March	16:02	Men's super combined
14 March	09:30	Women's giant slalom
14 March	10:30	Men's giant slalom
14 March	14:15	Women's giant slalom
14 March	15:15	Men's giant slalom
17 March	09:30	Men's slalom
17 March	14:00	Men's slalom
18 March	09:30	Women's slalom
18 March	12:30	Women's slalom

== Medal summary ==
=== Medal table ===
Rank	Nation	Gold	Silver	Bronze	Total
1	Slovakia (SVK)	6	4	1	11
2	France (FRA)	4	5	2	11
3	Germany (GER)	4	5	1	10
4	Canada (CAN)	3	1	6	10
5	Switzerland (SUI)	3	0	0	3
6	Italy (ITA)	2	1	1	4
7	Great Britain (GBR)	1	4	2	7
8	Japan (JPN)	1	3	2	6
8	United States (USA)	1	3	2	6
10	Neutral Paralympic Athletes (NPA)	1	1	2	4
11	Netherlands (NED)	1	1	0	2
12	New Zealand (NZL)	1	0	2	3
13	Norway (NOR)	1	0	1	2
14	Croatia (CRO)	1	0	0	1
15	Austria (AUT)	0	1	4	5
16	Spain (ESP)	0	1	0	1
17	Australia (AUS)	0	0	2	2
18	Belgium (BEL)	0	0	1	1
18	Poland (POL)	0	0	1	1
Totals (19 entries)		30	30	30	90

=== Women's events ===
Event	Class	Gold		Silver		Bronze	
Downhill	visually impaired	Henrieta Farkašová; Guide: Natália Šubrtová; Slovakia	1:29.72	Millie Knight; Guide: Brett Wild; Great Britain	1:30.58	Eléonor Sana; Guide: Chloe Sana; Belgium	1:31.60
Downhill	sitting	Anna Schaffelhuber; Germany	1:33.26	Momoka Muraoka; Japan	1:34.75	Laurie Stephens; United States	1:35.80
Downhill	standing	Marie Bochet; France	1:30.30	Andrea Rothfuß; Germany	1:32.53	Mollie Jepsen; Canada	1:34.60
Super-G	visually impaired	Henrieta Farkašová; Guide: Natália Šubrtová; Slovakia	1:30.17	Millie Knight; Guide: Brett Wild; Great Britain	1:33.76	Menna Fitzpatrick; Guide: Jennifer Kehoe; Great Britain	1:34.54
Super-G	sitting	Anna Schaffelhuber; Germany	1:34.76	Claudia Lösch; Austria	1:35.71	Momoka Muraoka; Japan	1:36.10
Super-G	standing	Marie Bochet; France	1:32.83	Andrea Rothfuß; Germany	1:33.10	Alana Ramsay; Canada	1:35.20
Giant slalom	visually impaired	Henrieta Farkašová; Guide: Natália Šubrtová; Slovakia	2:23.00	Menna Fitzpatrick; Guide: Jennifer Kehoe; Great Britain	2:28.34	Melissa Perrine; Guide: Christian Geiger; Australia	2:28.81
Giant slalom	sitting	Momoka Muraoka; Japan	2:26.53	Linda van Impelen; Netherlands	2:29.24	Claudia Lösch; Austria	2:29.30
Giant slalom	standing	Marie Bochet; France	2:22.92	Andrea Rothfuß; Germany	2:25.18	Mollie Jepsen; Canada	2:25.72
Slalom	visually impaired	Menna Fitzpatrick; Guide: Jennifer Kehoe; Great Britain	1:51.80	Henrieta Farkašová; Guide: Natália Šubrtová; Slovakia	1:52.46	Millie Knight; Guide: Brett Wild; Great Britain	1:53.39
Slalom	sitting	Anna-Lena Forster; Germany	1:55.82	Momoka Muraoka; Japan	2:01.19	Heike Eder; Austria	2:04.85
Slalom	standing	Marie Bochet; France	1:55.46	Mollie Jepsen; Canada	1:59.59	Andrea Rothfuß; Germany	2:00.08
Super combined	visually impaired	Henrieta Farkašová; Guide: Natália Šubrtová; Slovakia	2:27.72	Menna Fitzpatrick; Guide: Jennifer Kehoe; Great Britain	2:29.00	Melissa Perrine; Guide: Christian Geiger; Australia	2:30.82
Super combined	sitting	Anna-Lena Forster; Germany	2:27.59	Anna Schaffelhuber; Germany	2:30.11	Momoka Muraoka; Japan	2:30.25
Super combined	standing	Mollie Jepsen; Canada	2:32.70	Andrea Rothfuß; Germany	2:33.07	Alana Ramsay; Canada	2:36.08

=== Men's events ===
Event	Class	Gold		Silver		Bronze	
Downhill	visually impaired	Mac Marcoux; Guide: Jack Leitch; Canada	1:23.93	Jakub Krako; Guide: Branislav Brozman; Slovakia	1:25.35	Giacomo Bertagnolli; Guide: Fabrizio Casal; Italy	1:26.46
Downhill	sitting	Andrew Kurka; United States	1:24.11	Taiki Morii; Japan	1:25.75	Corey Peters; New Zealand	1:26.01
Downhill	standing	Théo Gmür; Switzerland	1:25.45	Arthur Bauchet; France	1:26.29	Markus Salcher; Austria	1:26.39
Super-G	visually impaired	Jakub Krako; Guide: Branislav Brozman; Slovakia	1:26.11	Giacomo Bertagnolli; Guide: Fabrizio Casal; Italy	1:26.29	Miroslav Haraus; Guide: Maroš Hudík; Slovakia	1:26.66
Super-G	sitting	Kurt Oatway; Canada	1:25.83	Andrew Kurka; United States	1:26.89	Frederic Francois; France	1:26.98
Super-G	standing	Théo Gmür; Switzerland	1:24.83	Arthur Bauchet; France	1:26.64	Markus Salcher; Austria	1:27.89
Giant slalom	visually impaired	Giacomo Bertagnolli; Guide: Fabrizio Casal; Italy	2:10.51	Jakub Krako; Guide: Branislav Brozman; Slovakia	2:15.59	Mac Marcoux; Guide: Jack Leitch; Canada	2:17.51
Giant slalom	sitting	Jesper Pedersen; Norway	2:13.45	Tyler Walker; United States	2:13.79	Igor Sikorski; Poland	2:15.90
Giant slalom	standing	Théo Gmür; Switzerland	2:12.47	Alexey Bugaev; Neutral Paralympic Athletes	2:13.49	Alexis Guimond; Canada	2:13.67
Slalom	visually impaired	Giacomo Bertagnolli; Guide: Fabrizio Casal; Italy	1:36.12	Jakub Krako; Guide: Branislav Brozman; Slovakia	1:37.54	Valery Redkozubov; Guide: Evgeny Geroev; Neutral Paralympic Athletes	1:38.02
Slalom	sitting	Dino Sokolović; Croatia	1:39.82	Tyler Walker; United States	1:40.55	Frédéric François; France	1:42.03
Slalom	standing	Adam Hall; New Zealand	1:36.11	Arthur Bauchet; France	1:36.50	Jamie Stanton; United States	1:37.37
Super combined	visually impaired	Miroslav Haraus; Guide: Maroš Hudík; Slovakia	2:14.22	Yon Santacana Maiztegui; Guide: Miguel Galindo Garcés; Spain	2:15.13	Valery Redkozubov; Guide: Evgeny Geroev; Neutral Paralympic Athletes	2:17.10
Super combined	sitting	Jeroen Kampschreur; Netherlands	2:11.59	Frédéric François; France	2:12.91	Jesper Pedersen; Norway	2:13.74
Super combined	standing	Alexey Bugaev; Neutral Paralympic Athletes	2:10.56	Arthur Bauchet; France	2:10.88	Adam Hall; New Zealand	2:15.32

== See also ==
- Alpine skiing at the 2018 Winter Olympics
- IPC – Official website
- Multi-Medallists - Alpine Skiing IPC – Official website
