= Luke McDermott =

American ice sledge hockey player

Personal information
- Born: September 1, 1987 (age 38) Albany, New York, U.S.
Medal record
Para ice hockey
Representing United States
Paralympic Games
Gold medal – first place	2018 PyeongChang	Team competition
World Championships
Gold medal – first place	2015 Buffalo	Team competition
Gold medal – first place	2019 Ostrava	Team competition
Silver medal – second place	2017 Gangneung	Team competition

Luke McDermott (born September 1, 1987) is an American gold medal ice sled hockey player. He was a member of the gold medal-winning US team in Para ice hockey at the 2018 Winter Paralympics. His disability is an amputation due to an incident when he was a Marine in the Afghan War.
