= Mia Zutter =

American biathlete

Personal information
- National team: United States
- Born: 16 July 1999 (age 27) Fridley, Minnesota, U.S.
- Education: College of St. Scholastica
- Occupation: Student
- Height: 5 ft 4 in (163 cm)

Sport
- Country: United States
- Sport: Nordic skiing
- Disability: Loss of central vision
- Disability class: B3
- Events: Biathlon, cross-country skiing
- College team: College of Saint Scholastica Ski Team

Mia Zutter (born July 16, 1999) is an American Paralympic athlete who competes in Nordic skiing in the B3 classification. She made her Paralympic debut at the 2018 Winter Games as part of the United States team.

== Early life ==
Mia Zutter was born in Fridley, Minnesota, on July 16, 1999, to Michael and Jennifer Zutter. In 2011, Mia was diagnosed with Stargardt disease, which resulted in the loss of her central vision. This was shortly prior to her seventh grade at school. She had already been involved heavily in running at the time, and continued to do so with the aid of a guide.

In her sophomore year at Sun Prairie High School in Sun Prairie, Wisconsin, her story was covered by the Wisconsin State Journal, which brought her to the attention of the Central Cross Country Ski Association. They offered her a place on their Paralympic development team, which she accepted with the support of her parents.

== Athletic career ==
In January 2016, she competed in the International Paralympic Committee Nordic Skiing Continental Cup at Craftsbury, Vermont, which also doubled as the US Paralympics National competition. She performed well, qualifying for a World Cup test event in Finesterau, Germany during the following month. Later that year in June, she was named to the US Paralympic Development Team. She continued to compete, seeking to qualify for the 2018 Winter Paralympics. After her results at a World Cup event in Canmore, Alberta in December 2017, she was informed at the end of the following January that she had been named to the United States team to compete in three or four events. At the time of her selection, she was a student at the College of St. Scholastica. She is classified in the B3 class for Paralympic competition.

=== 2018 Winter Paralympics ===
She made her Paralympics debut in the women's 15 kilometre cross-country event on March 12. She finished in eighth place overall, alongside her guide Kristina Trygstad-Saari.
