= Switzerland at the 2018 Winter Paralympics =

- IPC code: SUI
- NPC: Swiss Paralympic Committee
- Website: www.swissparalympic.ch

in Pyeongchang
- Competitors: 13 in 3 sports
- Flag bearer: Felix Wagner (opening)
- Medals Ranked 11th: Gold 3 Silver 0 Bronze 0 Total 3

Winter Paralympics appearances (overview)
- 1976; 1980; 1984; 1988; 1992; 1994; 1998; 2002; 2006; 2010; 2014; 2018; 2022; 2026

Switzerland competed at the 2018 Winter Paralympics in Pyeongchang, South Korea, held between 9–18 March 2018. They sent a team of 13 participants in 3 sports.

== Medalists ==
Medal	Name	Sport	Event	Date
Gold	Théo Gmür	Alpine skiing	Men's downhill, standing	10 March
Gold	Théo Gmür	Alpine skiing	Men's super-G, standing	11 March
Gold	Théo Gmür	Alpine skiing	Men's giant slalom, standing	14 March

== Alpine skiing ==
Men

Athlete	Event	Run 1		Run 2		Total	
Athlete	Event	Time	Rank	Time	Rank	Time	Rank
Michael Brügger							
Robin Cuche							
Théo Gmür							
Christoph Kunz							
Murat Pelit							
Thomas Pfyl							

Women

Athlete	Event	Run 1		Run 2		Total	
Athlete	Event	Time	Rank	Time	Rank	Time	Rank
Stephani Victor							

== Cross-country skiing ==
Men's distance

Athlete	Event	Final	
Athlete	Event	Time	Rank
Luca Tavasci; Guide: TBD			

== Wheelchair curling ==
Summary

Team	Event	Group stage												Tiebreaker	Semifinal	Final / BM	
Team	Event	Opposition Score	Opposition Score	Opposition Score	Opposition Score	Opposition Score	Opposition Score	Opposition Score	Opposition Score	Opposition Score	Opposition Score	Opposition Score	Rank	Opposition Score	Opposition Score	Opposition Score	Rank
Felix Wagner; Claudia Hüttenmoser; Marcel Bodenmann; Beatrix Blaudel; Hans Burgener	Mixed	(Canada) CAN; L 0–8	(United Kingdom) GBR; W 7–4	(Slovakia) SVK; W 6–5	(China) CHN; L 2–8	(Norway) NOR; L 3–6	(Finland) FIN; W 10–7	(South Korea) KOR; L 5–6	(United States) USA; W 7–4	(Germany) GER; W 9–4	(International Paralympic Committee) NPA; L 4–6	(Sweden) SWE; L 3–5	6	did not advance			

Pos	Team	Pld	W	L	PF	PA	PD	PCT	Ends Won	Ends Lost	Blank Ends	Stolen Ends	Shot %	Qualification
1	South Korea	11	9	2	65	51	14	0.818	38	36	9	11	66%	Advance to playoffs
2	Canada	11	9	2	74	45	29	0.818	47	28	6	27	62%	Advance to playoffs
3	China	11	9	2	85	42	43	0.818	43	32	2	16	67%	Advance to playoffs
4	Norway	11	7	4	55	57	−2	0.636	41	35	5	15	58%	Advance to playoffs
5	Neutral Paralympic Athletes	11	5	6	61	63	−2	0.455	44	37	2	23	62%	
6	Switzerland	11	5	6	56	63	−7	0.455	36	45	2	11	61%	
7	Great Britain	11	5	6	57	53	4	0.455	41	41	6	20	62%	
8	Germany	11	5	6	57	68	−11	0.455	37	39	5	16	54%	
9	Slovakia	11	4	7	62	72	−10	0.364	39	46	1	11	57%	
10	Sweden	11	4	7	47	66	−19	0.364	29	45	8	8	57%	
11	Finland	11	2	9	53	87	−34	0.182	35	46	1	11	51%	
12	United States	11	2	9	58	63	−5	0.182	37	45	3	12	60%	

Source: Paralympic.org

Round-robin

Switzerland has a bye in draws 2, 4, 6, 9, 14 and 16.

Draw 1

Saturday, 10 March, 14:35

Sheet B	1	2	3	4	5	6	7	8	Final
Switzerland (Wagner)	0	0	0	0	0	0	X	X	0
Canada (Ideson) 🔨	2	1	1	1	2	1	X	X	8

Draw 3

Sunday, 11 March, 9:35

Sheet C	1	2	3	4	5	6	7	8	Final
Switzerland (Wagner)	0	0	3	0	1	2	0	1	7
Great Britain (Neilson) 🔨	1	1	0	1	0	0	1	0	4

Draw 5

Sunday, 11 March, 19:35

Sheet A	1	2	3	4	5	6	7	8	Final
Slovakia (Ďuriš) 🔨	0	1	1	1	1	0	1	0	5
Switzerland (Wagner)	3	0	0	0	0	1	0	2	6

Draw 7

Monday, 12 March, 14:35

Sheet B	1	2	3	4	5	6	7	8	Final
China (Wang) 🔨	1	0	1	0	1	3	2	X	8
Switzerland (Wagner)	0	1	0	1	0	0	0	X	2

Draw 8

Monday, 12 March, 19:35

Sheet A	1	2	3	4	5	6	7	8	Final
Switzerland (Wagner)	0	0	1	0	1	0	1	0	3
Norway (Stordahl) 🔨	1	1	0	2	0	1	0	1	6

Draw 10

Tuesday, 13 March, 14:35

Sheet D	1	2	3	4	5	6	7	8	Final
Finland (S. Karjalainen)	0	0	3	0	1	2	1	0	7
Switzerland (Wagner) 🔨	3	2	0	3	0	0	0	2	10

Draw 11

Tuesday, 13 March, 19:35

Sheet C	1	2	3	4	5	6	7	8	Final
Switzerland (Wagner)	0	1	0	1	1	0	1	1	5
South Korea (Seo) 🔨	2	0	1	0	0	3	0	0	6

Draw 12

Wednesday, 14 March, 9:35

Sheet D	1	2	3	4	5	6	7	8	Final
Switzerland (Wagner)	0	2	1	0	1	0	1	2	7
United States (Black) 🔨	1	0	0	1	0	2	0	0	4

Draw 13

Wednesday, 14 March, 14:35

Sheet C	1	2	3	4	5	6	7	8	Final
Germany (Putzich) 🔨	0	1	0	0	3	0	X	X	4
Switzerland (Wagner)	1	0	4	2	0	2	X	X	9

Draw 15

Thursday, 15 March, 9:35

Sheet B	1	2	3	4	5	6	7	8	Final
Switzerland (Wagner)	0	0	1	2	0	0	1	0	4
Neutral Paralympic Athletes (Kurokhtin) 🔨	2	1	0	0	1	1	0	1	6

Draw 17

Thursday, 15 March, 19:35

Sheet A	1	2	3	4	5	6	7	8	Final
Sweden (Petersson Dahl) 🔨	0	1	0	0	0	1	0	3	5
Switzerland (Wagner)	0	0	1	0	1	0	1	0	3

== See also ==
- Switzerland at the 2018 Winter Olympics
- Switzerland at the Paralympics
