= Frédéric François (alpine skier) =

French para-alpine skier (born 1977)

Personal information
- Born: 25 January 1977 (age 49) Louviers, France
Medal record
Men's para-alpine skiing
Representing France
Winter Paralympics
Silver medal – second place	2018 Pyeongchang	Super combined, sitting
Bronze medal – third place	2018 Pyeongchang	Super-G, sitting
Bronze medal – third place	2018 Pyeongchang	Slalom, sitting

Frédéric François (born 25 January 1977) is an alpine skier who won a silver and bronze medal for France at the 2018 Winter Paralympics.
