= Jakub Krako =

Slovak para-alpine skier (born 1990)

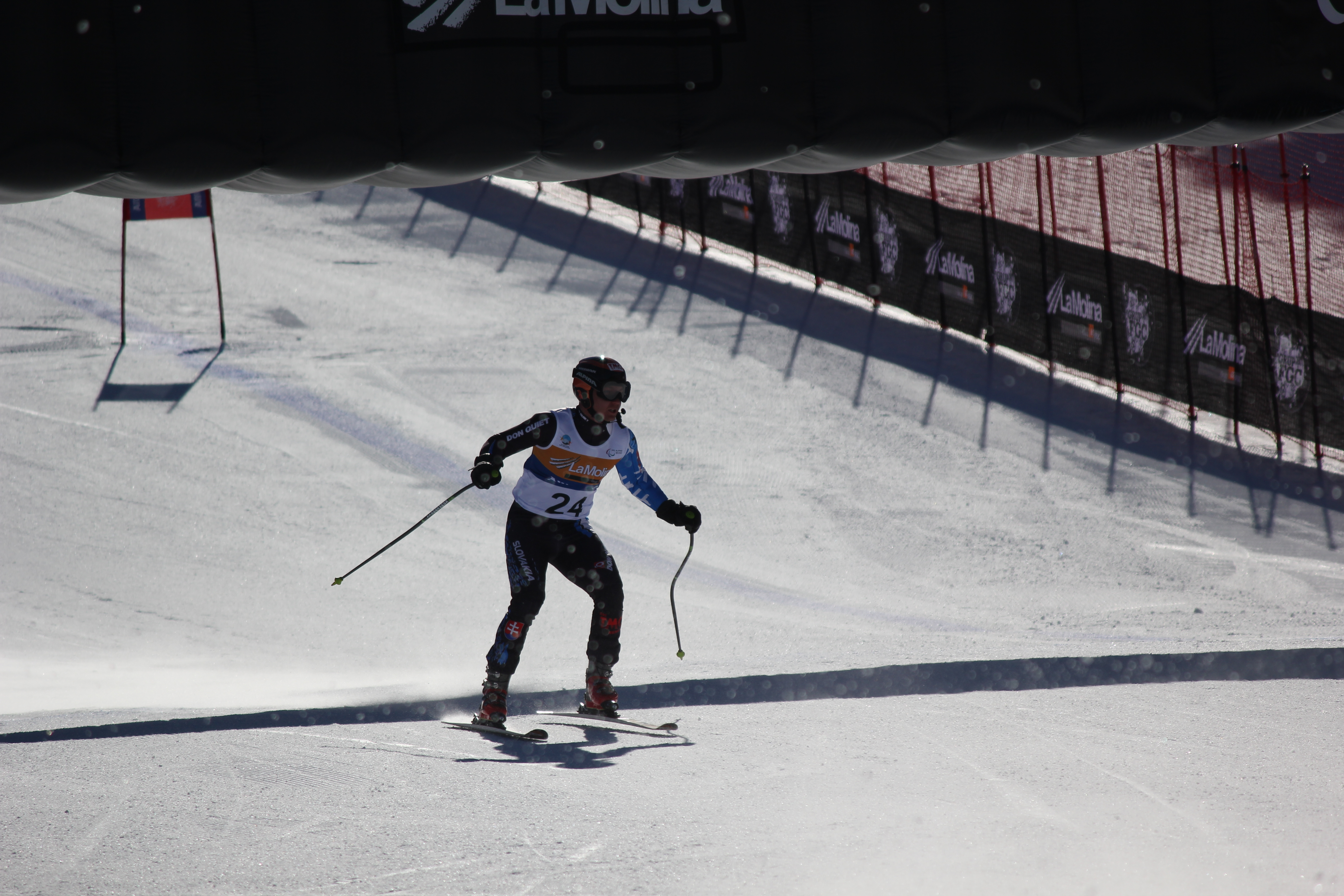
- Krako at the 2013 IPC World Championships

Personal information
- Born: 7 July 1990 (age 36) Žilina, Czechoslovakia

Sport
- Sport: Skiing
Medal record
Men's para alpine skiing – Visually impaired
Representing Slovakia
Paralympic Games
Gold medal – first place	2010 Vancouver	Giant slalom
Gold medal – first place	2010 Vancouver	Slalom
Gold medal – first place	2010 Vancouver	Combined
Gold medal – first place	2014 Sochi	Super-G
Gold medal – first place	2018 Pyeongchang	Super-G
Silver medal – second place	2010 Vancouver	Super-G
Silver medal – second place	2014 Sochi	Giant slalom
Silver medal – second place	2018 Pyeongchang	Downhill
Silver medal – second place	2018 Pyeongchang	Giant slalom
Silver medal – second place	2018 Pyeongchang	Slalom
IPC Alpine Skiing World Championships
Gold medal – first place	2009 Pyeongchang	Slalom
Gold medal – first place	2011 Sestriere	Slalom
Silver medal – second place	2009 Pyeongchang	Giant slalom
Silver medal – second place	2009 Pyeongchang	Super combined
Silver medal – second place	2011 Sestriere	Giant slalom
Silver medal – second place	2011 Sestriere	Super combined
Silver medal – second place	2017 Tarvisio	Super-G
Silver medal – second place	2019 Kranjska Gora	Super-G
Silver medal – second place	2019 Kranjska Gora	Super Combined
Bronze medal – third place	2011 Sestriere	Team event
Bronze medal – third place	2017 Tarvisio	Slalom
Bronze medal – third place	2017 Tarvisio	Super Combined
Bronze medal – third place	2019 Kranjska Gora	Downhill
Bronze medal – third place	2021 Lillehammer	Downhill
Bronze medal – third place	2021 Lillehammer	Slalom

Jakub Krako (born 7 July 1990) is a visually impaired alpine skier who competed for Slovakia at the 2010 Winter Paralympics. He won three gold medals and a silver medal at the 2010 Winter Paralympics. Krako won his fourth Paralympic gold at the 2014 Winter Paralympics.
