= Lara Falk =

Australian skier and sighted guide

Personal information
- Full name: Lara Falk
- Nationality: Australia
- Born: 1 February 1997 (age 29)

Sport
- Country: Australia
- Sport: Para-alpine skiing
- Event: Giant slalom slalom
Medal record
Guide for men's para-alpine skiing

Lara Falk (born 1 February 1997) is an Australian skier and sighted guide for visually impaired skiers. She was Patrick Jensen's guide at the 2018 Winter Paralympics.

Falk lives in Cooriemungle, Victoria and is studying a Bachelor of Urban, Rural and Environmental Planning at La Trobe University.

Falk is the guide for Paralympic skier Patrick Jensen. At the 2016/17 World Para- alpine Skiing Europa Cup event in Veysonnaz, Switzerland, they won the bronze medal in the Men’s Super-G and giant slalom visually impaired. At the 2017 World Para-alpine skiing World Championships in Tarvisio, Italy, they finished ninth in the men's slalom Slalom Visually Impaired.

At the 2018 Winter Paralympics, Jensen with his guide Falk finished 11th in the men's giant slalom visually impaired and did not finish in the men's slalom visually impaired.
