= Jamie Stanton (alpine skier) =

American para-alpine skier

Personal information
- Full name: James Stanton
- Born: June 16, 1994 (age 32) Rochester Hills, Michigan, U.S.

Sport
- Country: United States
- Sport: Paralympic alpine skiing
- Disability class: LW4
Medal record
Men's para-alpine skiing
Representing United States
Winter Paralympics
Bronze medal – third place	2018 Pyeongchang	Slalom standing

Jamie Stanton (born June 16, 1994), also known as James Stanton, is an American male Paralympic alpine skier. He has competed at the Winter Paralympics in 2014 and 2018.

== Career ==
He made his Paralympic debut for United States at the 2014 Winter Paralympics and went medalless after competing in the alpine skiing events. He competed at the 2014 Winter Paralympics as James Stanton.

He also represented United States at the 2018 Winter Paralympics and competed as Jamie Stanton. Jamie Stanton claimed his first Paralympic medal at the 2018 Winter Paralympics, claiming a bronze medal in the men's slalom standing event.
