= Andrew Kurka =

American Para alpine skier (born 1992)

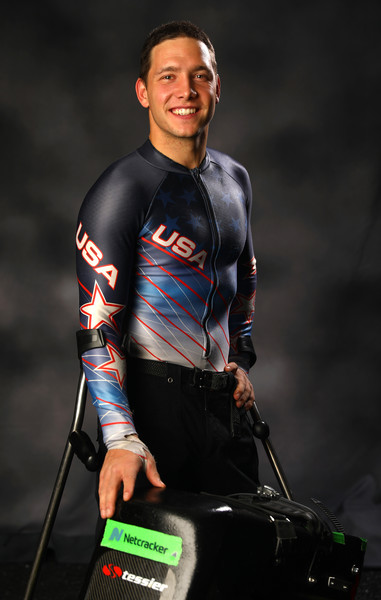
- Kurka in 2017

Personal information
- Full name: Andrew Earl Kurka
- Born: January 27, 1992 (age 34) Anchorage, Alaska, U.S.
- Height: 5 ft 9 in (175 cm)
- Weight: 150 lb (68 kg)

Sport
- Country: United States
- Sport: Para alpine skiing
- Disability class: LW12-1
- Events: Downhill slalom giant slalom Super combined Super-G
Medal record
Men's Para alpine skiing
Representing the United States
Paralympic Games
Gold medal – first place	2018 Pyeongchang	Downhill sitting
Silver medal – second place	2018 Pyeongchang	Super-G sitting
Bronze medal – third place	2026 Milano Cortina	Super-G sitting
World Championships
Gold medal – first place	2017 Tarvisio	Downhill sitting
Silver medal – second place	2017 Tarvisio	Giant slalom sitting
World Cup
Gold medal – first place	2015/16 Kuhtai	Giant slalom sitting
Gold medal – first place	2016/17 St. Moritz	Super-G sitting
Gold medal – first place	2017/18 Kimberley WCF	Downhill sitting 1
Gold medal – first place	2017/18 Kimberley WCF	Super-G sitting 1
Silver medal – second place	2015/16 Kuhtai	Super-G sitting
Bronze medal – third place	2014/15 Tignes	Super-G sitting
Bronze medal – third place	2016/17 St. Moritz	Super-G sitting
Bronze medal – third place	2017 Tarvisio	Super-G sitting
Bronze medal – third place	2017/18 Kimberley WCF	Downhill sitting 2

Andrew Earl Kurka (born January 27, 1992) is a Para alpine skier from Alaska who competes in the slalom, giant slalom, super G, downhill and super combined events. Kurka was a six-time Alaskan state champion in freestyle and Greco-Roman wrestling before he made it to the U.S. Paralympic National Team in 2010. As a World Champion medal winning para-alpine skier, Kurka qualified to represent the U.S. Paralympic team at the 2014 Winter Paralympics in Sochi for his debut Paralympics.

On March 10, 2018, Kurka won the downhill at the 2018 Winter Paralympics in Pyeongchang, South Korea, his first Paralympic medal.

== Biography ==
Born in Anchorage on January 27, 1992, Kurka grew up on a farm in a small Alaskan village called Nikolaevsk, where Russian is the most common language. In the summer months he spends his time Palmer, Alaska, while Aspen, Colorado is his home during the winter.

Kurka got injured at the age of 13 after an ATV accident severely damaged three vertebrae in the middle of his spinal cord. Leaving his athletic career as a wrestler behind, he tried the monoski for the first time at the age of 15 on the encouragement of his physical therapist through the Challenge Alaska. Moreover, the North Face of Mt. Alyeska in Girdwood, Alaska offers some of the steepest, most harrowing inbounds terrain of any developed ski area in the U.S. Andrew Kurka became the first person in a monoski to ski this Christmas Chute.

== Career ==
=== Skiing ===
Kurka became a para-alpine skier two years after his accident and made it his career after seeing the 2010 Winter Paralympics in Vancouver, Canada. He then made his international debut in the U.S. Paralympic National Team in 2010 and earned a spot on the U.S. Paralympic team for the 2014 Winter Paralympics in Sochi, Russia. Andrew crashed during a training run right before Games in Sochi and injured his back. He was unable to compete during the 2014 Paralympic Games in Sochi. At the beginning of 2018 he was selected to represent the U.S. Paralympic Team during the 2018 Winter Paralympics in Pyeongchang, South Korea.

=== Other ===
Kurka works as a country music DJ at Country Legends 100.9 in Wasilla, Alaska, during the summers. He also volunteers with Challenge Alaska.

Kurka was named as an Athlete Mentor for Classroom Champions in 2017. Classroom Champions is a non-profit organization partnering Olympic and Paralympic athletes with students and teachers in underserved communities. Andrew mentors students in San Diego, Washington D.C. and Twin Falls, Idaho.

== Achievements ==
In 2017, Kurka won 13 medals in international competitions and three at the World Championships in Tarvisio, Italy – one gold, one silver and one bronze – and is currently ranked the number-one sit skier in the world.

At the age of 17, Kurka competed as the first wheelchair bodybuilder at the Crystal Cup in Anchorage, Alaska.

The Alaska Children's Miracle Network took notice of Kurka's story and recruited him to be their "Miracle Child". As the 2007 CMN Hospitals Alaska Champion Ambassador, Kurka traveled widely, sharing his story with children whose futures were uncertain.
