= Théo Gmür =

Swiss para-alpine skier (born 1996)

Personal information
- Born: 8 August 1996 (age 29)
Medal record
Men's para alpine skiing
Representing Switzerland
Winter Paralympic Games
Gold medal – first place	2018 PyeongChang	Downhill Standing
Gold medal – first place	2018 PyeongChang	Super-G Standing
Gold medal – first place	2018 PyeongChang	Giant slalom Standing
Bronze medal – third place	2022 Beijing	Downhill Standing
World Championships
Silver medal – second place	2023 Lleida	Giant slalom Standing

Théo Gmür (born 8 August 1996) is an alpine skier who won gold for Switzerland in the standing division of Alpine skiing at the 2018 Winter Paralympics – Men's downhill. He has cerebral palsy.

He won the bronze medal in the men's downhill standing event at the 2022 Winter Paralympics held in Beijing, China.
