= Davide Bendotti =

Italian Para alpine skier (born 1994)

Personal information
- Born: 5 February 1994 (age 32) Clusone, Italy

Sport
- Country: Italy
- Sport: Para alpine skiing
- Disability class: LW2
- Events: Downhill, Slalom, Giant slalom, Super-G, Super combined

Achievements and titles
- Paralympic finals: PyeongChang 2018, Beijing 2022, Milan/Cortina 2026

Davide Bendotti (born 5 February 1994) is an Italian Para alpine skier. He is a three-time Paralympian.

== Early life ==
Bendotti was born in Clusone, in the province of Bergamo in the Lombardy region of Italy. He later lived in the mountain village of Colere, where skiing is a common winter activity. In 2011, when he was seventeen years old, he was involved in a serious motorcycle accident that resulted in the amputation of his left leg above the knee.

After months of hospitalisation and rehabilitation, Bendotti returned to sport. He initially practiced swimming before turning to alpine skiing, inspired in part by former Italian paralympic skier Luca Carrara, who encouraged him to pursue the discipline competitively.

== Career ==
Bendotti made his international debut in 2015 and competes in multiple alpine skiing disciplines including downhill, slalom, giant slalom, Super-G and super combined. He has become a regular member of the Italian national para-alpine ski team and has won several Italian national titles during his career.

He competed at the 2018 Winter Paralympics in PyeongChang and the 2022 Winter Paralympics in Beijing. He competed at the 2026 Winter Paralympics and finished in fifth-place in the super combined standing event with a total time of 2:02.40.

== Results ==
=== Paralympic Games ===
Year	Venue	Results
2018	South Korea Pyeongchang	12th Slalom; 19th Giant slalom 21st Downhill; 28th Super-G
2022	China Beijing	21st Giant slalom 22nd Super-G
2026	Italy Cortina d'Ampezzo	5th Super combined

=== World Championships ===
Year	Venue	Results
2019	Slovenia Kranjska Gora / Italy Sella Nevea	11th Super combined 13th Slalom
2023	Spain Espot	10th Slalom
2025	Slovenia Maribor	8th Giant slalom 11th Slalom
