= Kurt Oatway =

Canadian Para alpine skier (born 1984)

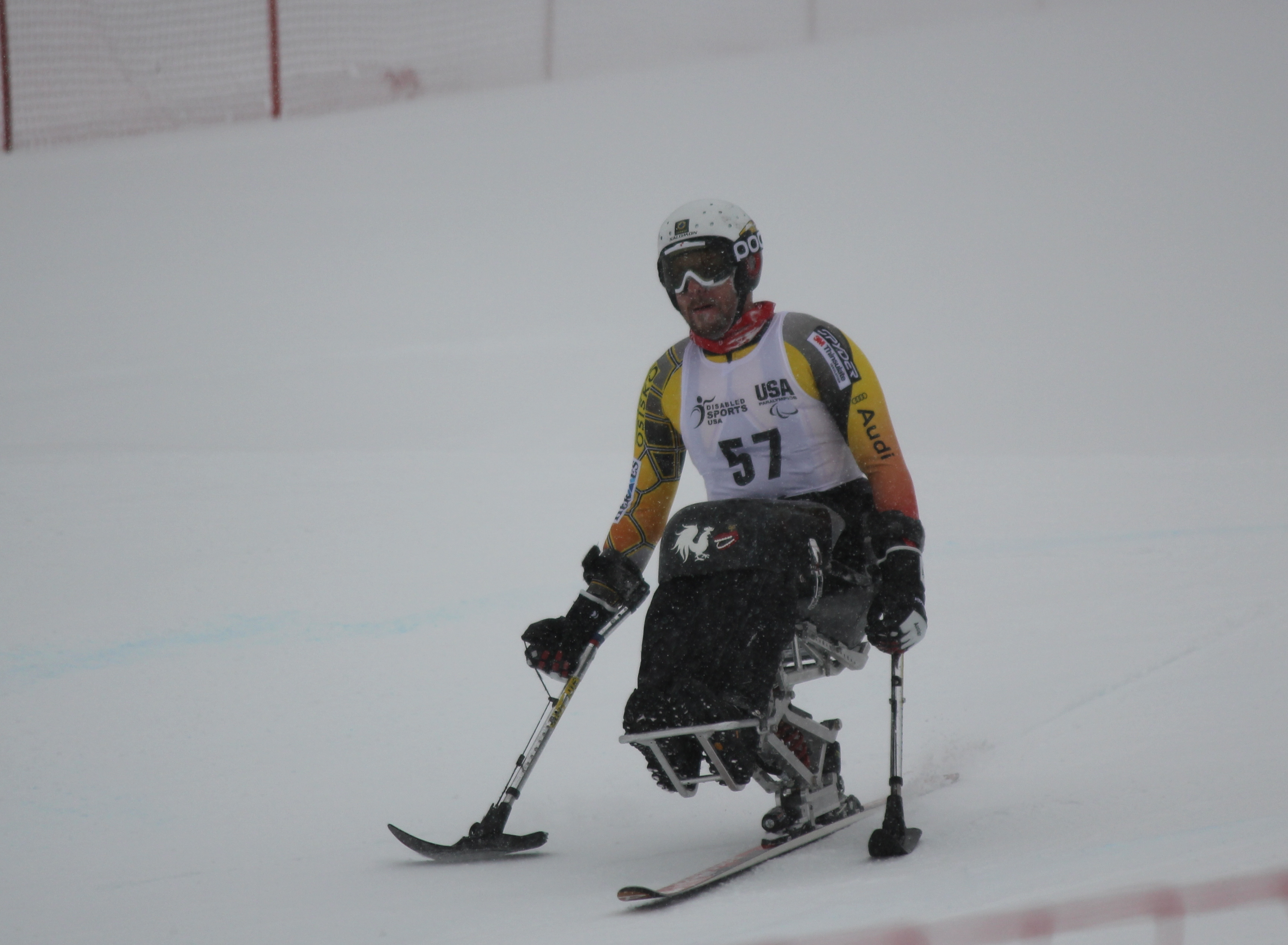
- Oatway in 2012

Personal information
- Born: 23 February 1984 (age 42)
- Home town: Calgary, Alberta, Canada

Sport
- Country: Canada
- Sport: Para alpine skiing
- Disability class: LW12-1
Medal record
Men's Para alpine skiing
Representing Canada
Paralympic Games
Gold medal – first place	2018 Pyeongchang	Super-G sitting
Bronze medal – third place	2026 Milano Cortina	Downhill sitting

Kurt Oatway (born 23 February 1984) is a Para alpine skier representing Canada at the 2018 Winter Paralympics. His disability is due to an injury in 2007. He won gold at the 2018 Winter Paralympics in men's sitting Super G at the Pyeongchang Paralympics. He also won silver medals at the 2019 World Para Alpine Skiing Championships in both the Downhill and Super-G events.

He has an interest in geology.
