= Mark Bathum =

American para-alpine skier (born 1958)

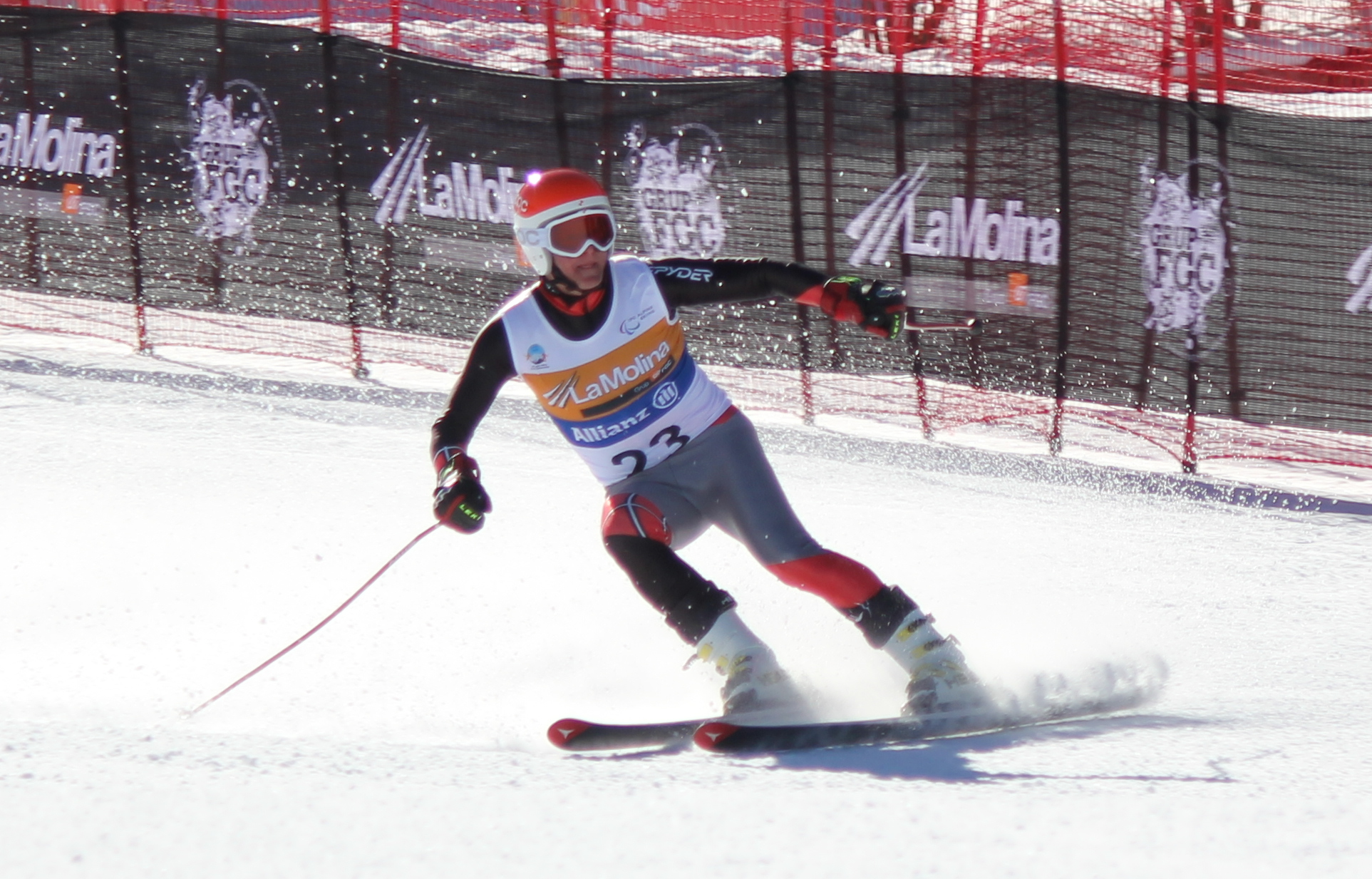
- Bathum at the 2013 IPC Alpine Skiing World Championships

Personal information
- Nationality: American
- Born: October 1, 1958 (age 67) Seattle, Washington, U.S.
- Home town: Mercer Island, Washington, U.S.
- Education: Mercer Island High School; University of Washington, University of California, Los Angeles
- Height: 5 ft 8 in (173 cm)
- Weight: 175 lb (79 kg)
- Website: www.markbathum.com

Sport
- Sport: Alpine skiing
- Disability: Visually impaired
- Disability class: B2
- Event(s): Downhill; Slalom; Giant slalom Super-G; Super combined
- Coached by: Kevin Jardine
Medal record
Alpine skiing
Representing United States
Paralympic Games
Silver medal – second place	2010 Vancouver	Men's downhill, visually impaired
Silver medal – second place	2014 Sochi	Men's super-G, visually impaired
Silver medal – second place	2014 Sochi	Men's super combined, visually impaired
IPC Alpine Skiing World Championships
Silver medal – second place	2015 Panorama	Downhill, visually impaired
- Updated on December 18, 2015

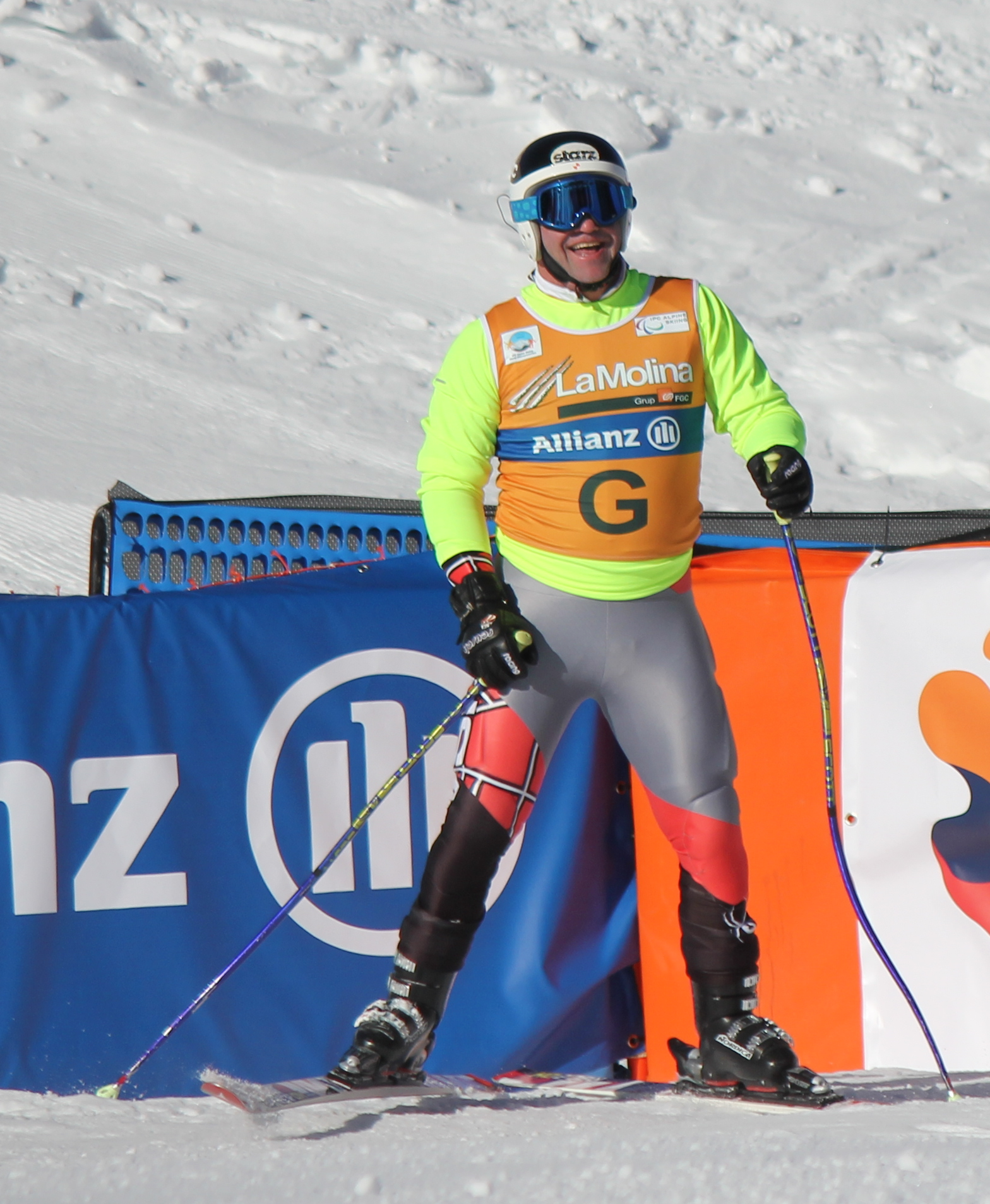
Sean Ramsden, Bathum's guide

Mark Bathum (born October 1, 1958) is an American Paralympic alpine skier. He has competed at two Winter Paralympics, two World Cups and two World Championships.

== Personal history ==
Mark Bathum was born on October 1, 1958, in Seattle, Washington. He was then brought up in Seattle. At age 9, he began skiing, and three years later, at 12, began ski racing.

Bathum graduated from Mercer Island High School in 1977, the University of Washington in 1981 (Finance and Marketing) and earned an MBA from UCLA in 1986.
