= Jonty O'Callaghan =

Australian para-alpine skier

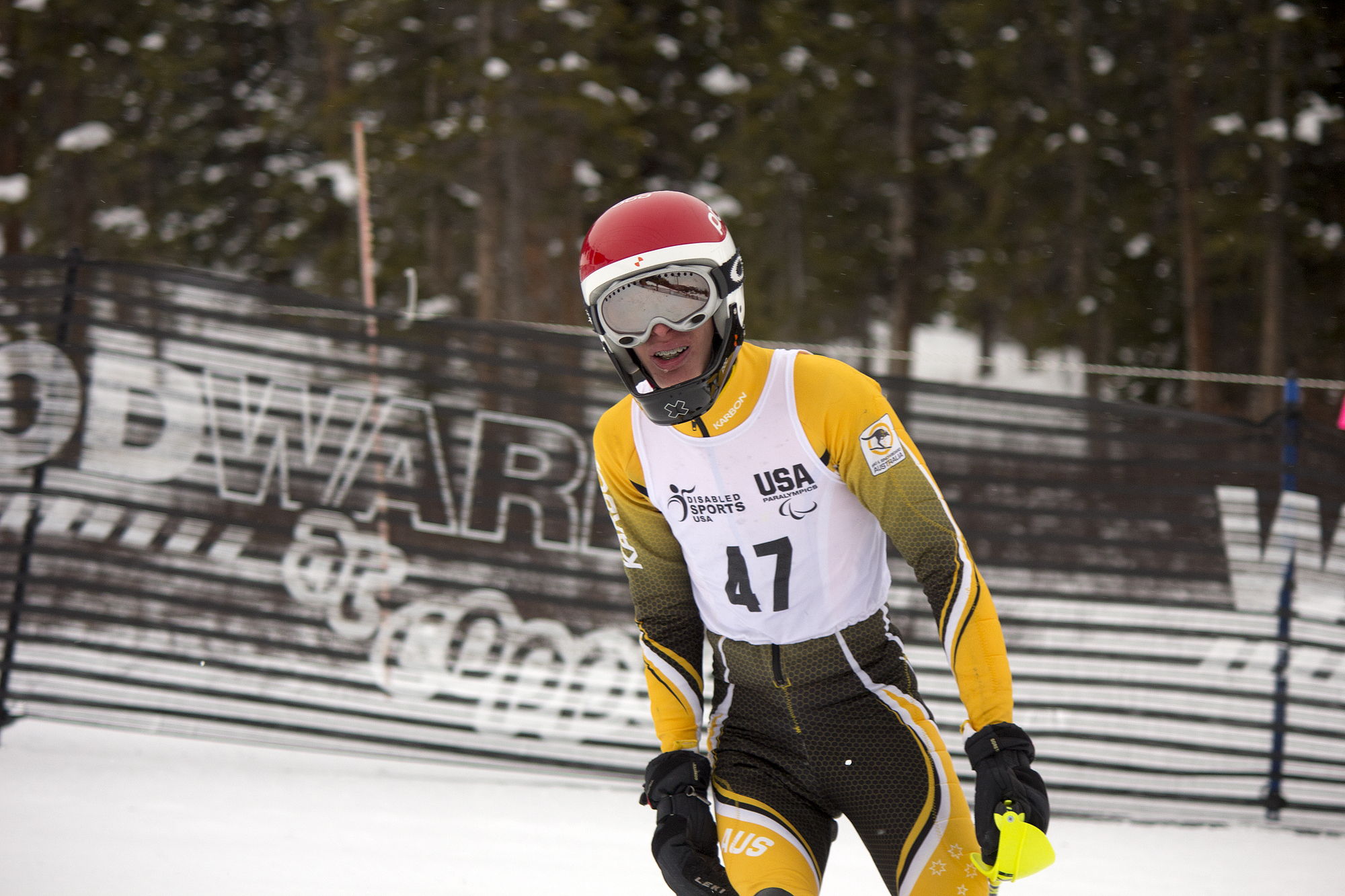
- Jonty O'Callaghan competing in the slalom during the last day of the 2012 IPC Nor Am Cup at Copper Mountain

Personal information
- Nickname: Jontos
- Nationality: Australian
- Born: 28 March 1997 (age 29) London, England

Sport
- Country: Australia
- Sport: Para-alpine skiing
- Disability class: LW9-1
- Events: Downhill; Super-G; Giant slalom slalom Super combined

Achievements and titles
- Paralympic finals: 2018 Winter Paralympics

Jonty O'Callaghan (born 28 March 1997) is an Australian para-alpine skier who competes in downhill racing. He represented Australia at the 2018 Winter Paralympics and was selected for 2022 Winter Paralympics but withdrew from the team due to a serious training accident on 17 February 2022 that led to concussion and a broken collarbone.

== Personal ==
O'Callaghan was born in London, England, with right side cerebral palsy hemiplegia. O'Callaghan underwent ten hours of physiotherapy, occupational therapy and speech therapy a week over 15 years at the Royal Children's Hospital. He attended Xavier College. In 2016, he was awarded University of Melbourne Elite Athlete Program (EAP) sporting scholarship whilst studying for a Bachelor of Arts.

O'Callaghan is also a descendant of Robert Hoddle, the surveyor who devised Melbourne's famed inner-city grid system.

== Skiing ==
O'Callaghan started skiing at age nine while on holiday with his family in Europe. He is classified as LW9-1. At the 2017 IPC Alpine Skiing World Championships in Tarvisio, Italy, he finished 18th in giant slalom standing and did not finish in the slalom standing.

At the 2018 Winter Paralympics, O'Callaghan competed in five events and his best results were 22nd in the men's downhill standing and 23rd in the men's giant slalom standing.

At the 2021 World Para Snow Sports Championships in Lillehammer, O'Callaghan finished 40th in the super-G standing.

O'Callaghan trains at Mount Buller, Victoria, and is coached by Christian Geiger. In 2018, he is a Victorian Institute of Sport scholarship athlete.
