= Sam Tait =

Australian para-alpine skier

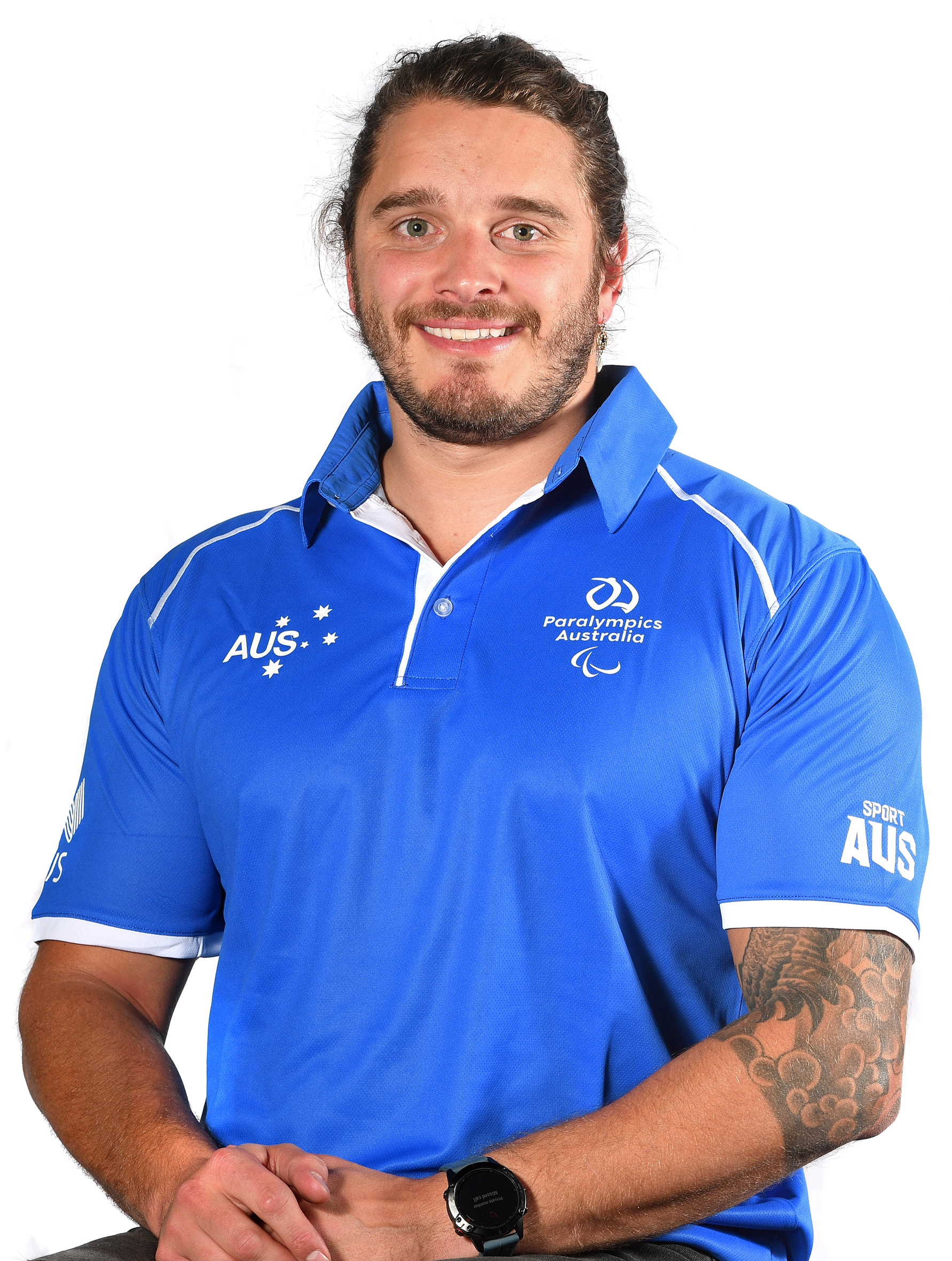
- Tait in April 2021

Personal information
- Nationality: Australia
- Born: 11 April 1991 (age 35)

Sport
- Country: Australia
- Sport: Para-alpine skiing
- Disability class: LW11
- Event: Super-G giant slalom slalom

Achievements and titles
- Paralympic finals: 2018 Winter Paralympics

Sam Tait (born 11 April 1991) is an Australian Paralympic alpine skier who represented Australia at the 2018 Winter Paralympics and 2022 Winter Paralympics.

== Personal ==
Tait was born on 11 April 1991. On 27 April 2013, he had a motorcycle accident Wollongong, New South Wales resulted in him breaking his T11 vertebra and becoming a paraplegic. Tait attended Chevalier College with his twin brother James. He has completed a two-year course in computer-aided design detailing at TAFE.

In 2020, Tait became the first paraplegic to climb Mount Kosciuszko without mechanical assistance. It took Tait seven hours to complete the 16 km route.

He lives in Mittagong, New South Wales.

== Skiing ==
Prior to his accident, Tait was an able-bodied skier. His parents own Corroboree Ski Lodge at Perisher Ski Resort. In 2014, he took up sit- skiing and became a member of the Australian Para-alpine skiing development squad. Tait made his debut for Australia in Landgraaf, the Netherlands in late 2016. At the 2017 IPC Alpine Skiing Europa Cup in Veysonnaz, Switzerland, he finished fourth in the men's Super-G. He is coached by Chris McKnight.

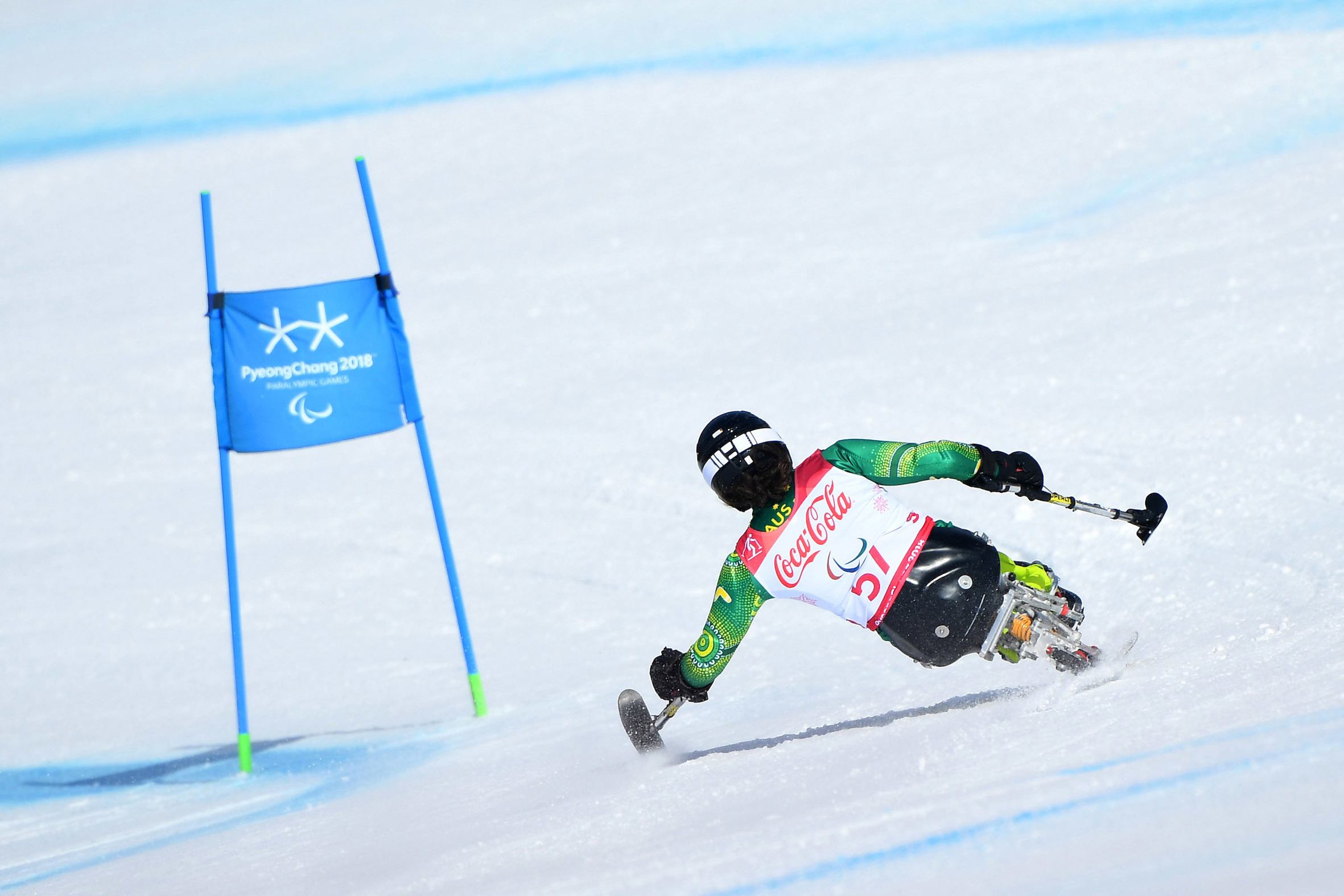
Sam Tait skis the downhill event at the 2018 Paralympic Games.

In 2017, Australian National University engineering students undertook a project to design and manufacture a lower leg protective enclosure for him to use while sit skiing. During the nation's pandemic in 2021, a University of New South Wales engineering group underwent a student project to design and manufacture a suitable prototype for a fixed rowing seat in Sam's possible transition to Olympic rowing. The student group included a partner of the manufacturing company ProtoMake, Michael Salem along with Mechatronic / Biomedical Engineer and designer for disability Phillip Ringer accompanied by designers Siddh Rawal, Sinead McCraith and Harry Boot.

At the 2018 Winter Paralympics, he competed in five events - 11th in the men's Downhill Sitting, 17th in the men's giant slalom Sitting and did not finish in three events.

At the 2019 World Para Alpine Skiing Championships in Kranjska Gora, Slovenia, he finished sixth in the men's Downhill Sitting and tenth in the men's giant slalom Sitting.

At the 2022 Winter Paralympics, Tait completed in three events. He finished 22nd in the men's giant slalom Sitting and failed to finish in the men's Downhill Sitting and Super G Sitting.
