= List of 2018 Winter Paralympics medal winners =

The 2018 Winter Paralympics, officially the XII Paralympic Winter Games, or the 12th Winter Paralympics, were held from 9 to 18 March 2018 in PyeongChang, South Korea. 80 events in 6 winter sport disciplines were contested.

== Alpine skiing ==
=== Women's events ===
Event	Class	Gold		Silver		Bronze	
Downhill	Visually impaired	Henrieta Farkašová; Guide: Natália Šubrtová; Slovakia	1:29.72	Millie Knight; Guide: Brett Wild; Great Britain	1:30.58	Eléonor Sana; Guide: Chloé Sana; Belgium	1:31.60
Downhill	Sitting	Anna Schaffelhuber; Germany	1:33.26	Momoka Muraoka; Japan	1:34.75	Laurie Stephens; United States	1:35.80
Downhill	Standing	Marie Bochet; France	1:30.30	Andrea Rothfuss; Germany	1:32.53	Mollie Jepsen; Canada	1:34.60
Super-G	Visually impaired	Henrieta Farkašová; Guide: Natália Šubrtová; Slovakia	1:30.17	Millie Knight; Guide: Brett Wild; Great Britain	1:33.76	Menna Fitzpatrick; Guide: Jennifer Kehoe; Great Britain	1:34.54
Super-G	Sitting	Anna Schaffelhuber; Germany	1:34.76	Claudia Lösch; Austria	1:35.71	Momoka Muraoka; Japan	1:36.10
Super-G	Standing	Marie Bochet; France	1:32.83	Andrea Rothfuss; Germany	1:33.10	Alana Ramsay; Canada	1:35.20
Giant slalom	Visually impaired	Henrieta Farkašová; Guide: Natália Šubrtová; Slovakia	2:23.00	Menna Fitzpatrick; Guide: Jennifer Kehoe; Great Britain	2:28.34	Melissa Perrine; Guide: Christian Geiger; Australia	2:28.81
Giant slalom	Sitting	Momoka Muraoka; Japan	2:26.53	Linda van Impelen; Netherlands	2:29.24	Claudia Lösch; Austria	2:29.30
Giant slalom	Standing	Marie Bochet; France	2:22.92	Andrea Rothfuss; Germany	2:25.18	Mollie Jepsen; Canada	2:25.72
Slalom	Visually impaired	Menna Fitzpatrick; Guide: Jennifer Kehoe; Great Britain	1:51.80	Henrieta Farkašová; Guide: Natália Šubrtová; Slovakia	1:52.46	Millie Knight; Guide: Brett Wild; Great Britain	1:53.39
Slalom	Sitting	Anna-Lena Forster; Germany	1:55.82	Momoka Muraoka; Japan	2:01.19	Heike Eder; Austria	2:04.85
Slalom	Standing	Marie Bochet; France	1:55.46	Mollie Jepsen; Canada	1:59.59	Andrea Rothfuss; Germany	2:00.08
Super combined	Visually impaired	Henrieta Farkašová; Guide: Natália Šubrtová; Slovakia	2:27.72	Menna Fitzpatrick; Guide: Jennifer Kehoe; Great Britain	2:29.00	Melissa Perrine; Guide: Christian Geiger; Australia	2:30.82
Super combined	Sitting	Anna-Lena Forster; Germany	2:27.59	Anna Schaffelhuber; Germany	2:30.11	Momoka Muraoka; Japan	2:30.25
Super combined	Standing	Mollie Jepsen; Canada	2:32.70	Andrea Rothfuss; Germany	2:33.07	Alana Ramsay; Canada	2:36.08

=== Men's events ===
Event	Class	Gold		Silver		Bronze	
Downhill	Visually impaired	Mac Marcoux; Guide: Jack Leitch; Canada	1:23.93	Jakub Krako; Guide: Branislav Brozman; Slovakia	1:25.35	Giacomo Bertagnolli; Guide: Fabrizio Casal; Italy	1:26.46
Downhill	Sitting	Andrew Kurka; United States	1:24.11	Taiki Morii; Japan	1:25.75	Corey Peters; New Zealand	1:26.01
Downhill	Standing	Théo Gmür; Switzerland	1:25.45	Arthur Bauchet; France	1:26.29	Markus Salcher; Austria	1:26.39
Super-G	Visually impaired	Jakub Krako; Guide: Branislav Brozman; Slovakia	1:26.11	Giacomo Bertagnolli; Guide: Fabrizio Casal; Italy	1:26.29	Miroslav Haraus; Guide: Maroš Hudík; Slovakia	1:26.66
Super-G	Sitting	Kurt Oatway; Canada	1:25.83	Andrew Kurka; United States	1:26.89	Frédéric François; France	1:26.98
Super-G	Standing	Théo Gmür; Switzerland	1:24.83	Arthur Bauchet; France	1:26.64	Markus Salcher; Austria	1:27.89
Giant slalom	Visually impaired	Giacomo Bertagnolli; Guide: Fabrizio Casal; Italy	2:10.51	Jakub Krako; Guide: Branislav Brozman; Slovakia	2:15.59	Mac Marcoux; Guide: Jack Leitch; Canada	2:17.51
Giant slalom	Sitting	Jesper Pedersen; Norway	2:13.45	Tyler Walker; United States	2:13.79	Igor Sikorski; Poland	2:15.90
Giant slalom	Standing	Théo Gmür; Switzerland	2:12.47	Alexey Bugaev; Neutral Paralympic Athletes	2:13.49	Alexis Guimond; Canada	2:13.67
Slalom	Visually impaired	Giacomo Bertagnolli; Guide: Fabrizio Casal; Italy	1:36.12	Jakub Krako; Guide: Branislav Brozman; Slovakia	1:37.54	Valerii Redkozubov; Guide: Evgeny Geroev; Neutral Paralympic Athletes	1:38.02
Slalom	Sitting	Dino Sokolović; Croatia	1:39.82	Tyler Walker; United States	1:40.55	Frédéric François; France	1:42.03
Slalom	Standing	Adam Hall; New Zealand	1:36.11	Arthur Bauchet; France	1:36.50	Jamie Stanton; United States	1:37.37
Super combined	Visually impaired	Miroslav Haraus; Guide: Maroš Hudík; Slovakia	2:14.22	Jon Santacana Maiztegui; Guide: Miguel Galindo Garcés; Spain	2:15.13	Valerii Redkozubov; Guide: Evgeny Geroev; Neutral Paralympic Athletes	2:17.10
Super combined	Sitting	Jeroen Kampschreur; Netherlands	2:11.59	Frédéric François; France	2:12.91	Jesper Pedersen; Norway	2:13.74
Super combined	Standing	Alexey Bugaev; Neutral Paralympic Athletes	2:10.56	Arthur Bauchet; France	2:10.88	Adam Hall; New Zealand	2:15.32

== Biathlon ==
=== Women's events ===
Event	Class	Gold		Silver		Bronze	
6 kilometres	Visually impaired	Mikhalina Lysova; Guide: Alexey Ivanov; Neutral Paralympic Athletes	18:48.3	Oksana Shyshkova; Guide: Vitaliy Kazakov; Ukraine	19:26.4	Sviatlana Sakhanenka; Guide: Raman Yashchanka; Belarus	20:28.2
6 kilometres	Sitting	Kendall Gretsch; United States	21:52.0	Oksana Masters; United States	22:14.8	Lidziya Hrafeyeva; Belarus	22:16.3
6 kilometres	Standing	Ekaterina Rumyantseva; Neutral Paralympic Athletes	17:06.1	Anna Milenina; Neutral Paralympic Athletes	17:21.8	Liudmyla Liashenko; Ukraine	17:44.4
10 kilometres	Visually impaired	Oksana Shyshkova; Guide: Vitaliy Kazakov; Ukraine	37:58.9	Mikhalina Lysova; Guide: Alexey Ivanov; Neutral Paralympic Athletes	40:12.4	Clara Klug; Guide: Martin Härtl; Germany	42:01.6
10 kilometres	Sitting	Andrea Eskau; Germany	42:36.6	Marta Zaynullina; Neutral Paralympic Athletes	43:52.1	Irina Gulyayeva; Neutral Paralympic Athletes	44:25.5
10 kilometres	Standing	Ekaterina Rumyantseva; Neutral Paralympic Athletes	34:10.0	Anna Milenina; Neutral Paralympic Athletes	35:30.0	Liudmyla Liashenko; Ukraine	36:23.6
12.5 kilometres	Visually impaired	Mikhalina Lysova; Guide: Alexey Ivanov; Neutral Paralympic Athletes	37:42.6	Oksana Shyshkova; Guide: Vitaliy Kazakov; Ukraine	40:31.1	Clara Klug; Guide: Martin Härtl; Germany	41:05.9
12.5 kilometres	Sitting	Andrea Eskau; Germany	49:41.2	Oksana Masters; United States	50:00.0	Lidziya Hrafeyeva; Belarus	50:57.0
12.5 kilometres	Standing	Anna Milenina; Neutral Paralympic Athletes	38:56.8	Ekaterina Rumyantseva; Neutral Paralympic Athletes	39:00.6	Brittany Hudak; Canada	41:20.7

=== Men's events ===
Event	Class	Gold		Silver		Bronze	
7.5 kilometres	Visually impaired	Vitaliy Lukyanenko; Guide: Ivan Marchyshak; Ukraine	19:51.0	Yury Holub; Guide: Dzmitry Budzilovich; Belarus	20:05.1	Anatolii Kovalevskyi; Guide: Oleksandr Mukshyn; Ukraine	20:30.1
7.5 kilometres	Sitting	Daniel Cnossen; United States	23:49.7	Dzmitry Loban; Belarus	23:57.0	Collin Cameron; Canada	23:59.0
7.5 kilometres	Standing	Benjamin Daviet; France	17:56.6	Mark Arendz; Canada	18:25.9	Ihor Reptyukh; Ukraine	18:40.9
12.5 kilometres	Visually impaired	Yury Holub; Guide: Dzmitry Budzilovich; Belarus	39:23.7	Oleksandr Kazik; Guide: Sergiy Kucheryaviy; Ukraine	39:26.1	Iurii Utkin; Guide: Ruslan Perekhoda; Ukraine	40:19.4
12.5 kilometres	Sitting	Taras Rad; Ukraine	45:35.6	Daniel Cnossen; United States	46:37.3	Andy Soule; United States	47:08.7
12.5 kilometres	Standing	Benjamin Daviet; France	35:25.3	Ihor Reptyukh; Ukraine	35:31.8	Mark Arendz; Canada	35:45.7
15 kilometres	Visually impaired	Vitaliy Lukyanenko; Guide: Ivan Marchyshak; Ukraine	45:12.9	Oleksandr Kazik; Guide: Sergiy Kucheryaviy; Ukraine	45:36.5	Anthony Chalençon; Guide: Simon Valverde; France	46:32.8
15 kilometres	Sitting	Martin Fleig; Germany	49:57.2	Daniel Cnossen; United States	50:42.7	Collin Cameron; Canada	50:59.1
15 kilometres	Standing	Mark Arendz; Canada	42:52.2	Benjamin Daviet; France	43:50.5	Nils-Erik Ulset; Norway	44:06.7

== Cross-country skiing ==
=== Women's events ===
Event	Class	Gold		Silver		Bronze	
1.1 kilometre sprint	Sitting	Oksana Masters; United States	4:06.7	Andrea Eskau; Germany	4:08.8	Marta Zaynullina; Neutral Paralympic Athletes	4:10.4
1.5 kilometre sprint	Visually impaired	Sviatlana Sakhanenka; Guide: Raman Yashchanka; Belarus	4:29.9	Mikhalina Lysova; Guide: Alexey Ivanov; Neutral Paralympic Athletes	4:44.0	Oksana Shyshkova; Guide: Vitaliy Kazakov; Ukraine	4:45.6
1.5 kilometre sprint	Standing	Anna Milenina; Neutral Paralympic Athletes	5:11.1	Vilde Nilsen; Norway	5:14.2	Natalie Wilkie; Canada	5:14.3
5 kilometres	Sitting	Oksana Masters; United States	16:42.0	Andrea Eskau; Germany	16:53.5	Marta Zaynullina; Neutral Paralympic Athletes	17:25.4
7.5 kilometres	Visually impaired	Sviatlana Sakhanenka; Guide: Raman Yashchanka; Belarus	22:19.3	Mikhalina Lysova; Guide: Alexey Ivanov; Neutral Paralympic Athletes	22:55.6	Carina Edlinger; Guide: Julian Edlinger; Austria	23:22.9
7.5 kilometres	Standing	Natalie Wilkie; Canada	22:12.2	Ekaterina Rumyantseva; Neutral Paralympic Athletes	22:13.8	Emily Young; Canada	22:13.9
12 kilometres	Sitting	Kendall Gretsch; United States	38:15.9	Andrea Eskau; Germany	38:43.3	Oksana Masters; United States	39:04.9
15 kilometres	Visually impaired	Sviatlana Sakhanenka; Guide: Raman Yashchanka; Belarus	49:11.7	Oksana Shyshkova; Guide: Vitaliy Kazakov; Ukraine	49:19.5	Mikhalina Lysova; Guide: Alexey Ivanov; Neutral Paralympic Athletes	52:29.2
15 kilometres	Standing	Ekaterina Rumyantseva; Neutral Paralympic Athletes	49:37.6	Anna Milenina; Neutral Paralympic Athletes	50:55.6	Liudmyla Liashenko; Ukraine	51:06.6

=== Men's events ===
Event	Class	Gold		Silver		Bronze	
1.1 kilometre sprint	Sitting	Andy Soule; United States	3:31.4	Dzmitry Loban; Belarus	3:31.4	Daniel Cnossen; United States	3:31.8
1.5 kilometre sprint	Visually impaired	Brian McKeever; Guide: Russell Kennedy; Canada	4:03.2	Zebastian Modin; Guide: Robin Bryntesson; Sweden	4:05.7	Eirik Bye; Guide: Arvid Nelson; Norway	4:32.7
1.5 kilometre sprint	Standing	Alexandr Kolyadin; Kazakhstan	4:19.7	Yoshihiro Nitta; Japan	4:20.5	Mark Arendz; Canada	4:20.8
1.5 kilometre sprint	Standing	Alexandr Kolyadin; Kazakhstan	4:19.7	Yoshihiro Nitta; Japan	4:20.5	Ilkka Tuomisto; Finland	4:20.8
7.5 kilometres	Sitting	Sin Eui-hyun; South Korea	22:28.4	Daniel Cnossen; United States	22:33.7	Maksym Yarovyi; Ukraine	22:39.9
10 kilometres	Visually impaired	Brian McKeever; Guide: Graham Nishikawa; Canada	23:17.8	Jake Adicoff; Guide: Sawyer Kesselheim; United States	24:31.3	Yury Holub; Guide: Dzmitry Budzilovich; Belarus	24:37.1
10 kilometres	Standing	Yoshihiro Nitta; Japan	24:06.8	Grygorii Vovchynskyi; Ukraine	24:15.5	Mark Arendz; Canada	24:27.1
15 kilometres	Sitting	Maksym Yarovyi; Ukraine	41:37.0	Daniel Cnossen; United States	42:20.7	Sin Eui-hyun; South Korea	42:28.9
20 kilometres	Visually impaired	Brian McKeever; Guide: Graham Nishikawa; Canada	46:02.4	Yury Holub; Guide: Dzmitry Budzilovich; Belarus	47:07.5	Thomas Clarion; Guide: Antoine Bollet; France	47:24.4
20 kilometres	Standing	Ihor Reptyukh; Ukraine	44:52.4	Benjamin Daviet; France	46:48.9	Håkon Olsrud; Norway	47:10.6

=== Relay events ===
Event	Gold		Silver		Bronze	
4 x 2.5km mixed relay	Ukraine (UKR); Iurii Utkin; Guide: Ruslan Perekhoda; Liudmyla Liashenko; Yuliia Batenkova-Bauman; Oksana Shyshkova; Guide: Vitaliy Kazakov	24:31.9	Canada (CAN); Natalie Wilkie; Emily Young; Chris Klebl; Mark Arendz	25:21.9	Germany (GER); Andrea Eskau; Steffen Lehmker; Alexander Ehler	25:25.3
4 x 2.5km open relay	France (FRA); Benjamin Daviet; Anthony Chalencon; Guide: Simon Valverde; Thomas Clarion; Guide: Antoine Bollet	22:46.6	Norway (NOR); Nils-Erik Ulset; Håkon Olsrud; Eirik Bye; Guide: Arvid Nelson	23:09.1	Canada (CAN); Collin Cameron; Brian McKeever; Guide: Graham Nishikawa	23:52.4

== Para ice hockey ==
Event	Gold	Silver	Bronze
Mixed	United States (USA)	Canada (CAN)	South Korea (KOR)
Mixed	Tyler Carron; Steve Cash; Ralph DeQuebec; Travis Dodson; Declan Farmer; Noah Grove; Billy Hanning Jr. Nikko Landeros; Jen Lee; Luke McDermott; Kevin McKee; Josh Misiewicz; Adam Page; Josh Pauls; Rico Roman; Brody Roybal; Jack Wallace	Rob Armstrong; Steve Arsenault; Brad Bowden; Billy Bridges; Dom Cozzolino; Ben Delaney; Adam Dixon; James Dunn; James Gemmell; Tyrone Henry; Liam Hickey; Dominic Larocque; Tyler McGregor; Bryan Sholomicki; Corbyn Smith; Corbin Watson; Greg Westlake	Cho Byeong-seok; Cho Young-jae; Choi Kwang-hyouk; Choi Si-woo; Han Min-su; Jang Dong-shin; Jang Jong-ho; Jung Seung-hwan; Kim Dea-jung; Kim Young-sung; Lee Hae-man; Lee Jae-woong; Lee Ji-hoon; Lee Jong-kyung; Lee Ju-seung; Lee Yong-min; Yu Man-gyun

== Snowboarding ==
=== Women's events ===
Event	Class	Gold		Silver		Bronze	
Banked slalom	SB-LL1	Brenna Huckaby; United States	56.17	Cécile Hernandez; France	56.53	Amy Purdy; United States	1:05.40
Banked slalom	SB-LL2	Bibian Mentel-Spee; Netherlands	56.94	Brittani Coury; United States	59.87	Lisa Bunschoten; Netherlands	1:00.04
Snowboard cross	SB-LL1	Brenna Huckaby; United States		Amy Purdy; United States		Cécile Hernandez; France	
Snowboard cross	SB-LL2	Bibian Mentel-Spee; Netherlands		Lisa Bunschoten; Netherlands		Astrid Fina; Spain	

=== Men's events ===
Event	Class	Gold		Silver		Bronze	
Banked slalom	SB-UL	Mike Minor; United States	50.77	Patrick Mayrhofer; Austria	51.36	Simon Patmore; Australia	51.99
Banked slalom	SB-LL1	Noah Elliott; United States	51.90	Mike Schultz; United States	53.42	Bruno Bosnjak; Croatia	54.08
Banked slalom	SB-LL2	Gurimu Narita; Japan	48.68	Evan Strong; United States	49.20	Matti Suur-Hamari; Finland	49.51
Snowboard cross	SB-UL	Simon Patmore; Australia		Manuel Pozzerle; Italy		Mike Minor; United States	
Snowboard cross	SB-LL1	Mike Schultz; United States		Chris Vos; Netherlands		Noah Elliott; United States	
Snowboard cross	SB-LL2	Matti Suur-Hamari; Finland		Keith Gabel; United States		Gurimu Narita; Japan	

== Wheelchair curling ==
Event	Gold	Silver	Bronze
Mixed	China (CHN); Wang Haitao; Chen Jianxin; Liu Wei; Wang Meng; Zhang Qiang	Norway (NOR); Rune Lorentsen; Jostein Stordahl; Ole Fredrik Syversen; Sissel Løchen; Rikke Iversen	Canada (CAN); Mark Ideson; Ina Forrest; Dennis Thiessen; Marie Wright; James Anseeuw

== See also ==
- 2018 Winter Paralympics medal table
