= Netherlands at the 2018 Winter Paralympics =

- Flag of the Netherlands
- IPC code: NED
- NPC: Nederlands Olympisch Comité * Nederlandse Sport Federatie
- Website: paralympisch.nl (in Dutch)

in Pyeongchang
- Competitors: 9 in 2 sports
- Flag bearers: Bibian Mentel (opening ceremony); Jeroen Kampschreur (closing ceremony)
- Medals: Gold 3 Silver 3 Bronze 1 Total 7

Winter Paralympics appearances (overview)
- 1984; 1988; 1992; 1994; 1998; 2002; 2006; 2010; 2014; 2018; 2022; 2026

The Netherlands sent competitors to the 2018 Winter Paralympics in Pyeongchang, South Korea. Four people competed in para-snowboarding. Five people competed in para-alpine skiing. Anna Jochemsen and Jeffrey Stuut are standing skiers. Linda van Impelen, Jeroen Kampschreur and Niels de Langen have all competed in all 5 para-alpine sit-ski events. Lisa Bunschoten, Bibian Mentel and Chris Vos all competed at the 2014 Winter Paralympics in Sochi. Renske van Beek was the only snowboarder on Team Netherlands who did not go to Sochi.

== Team ==
There were four people who competed in the Paralympics in para-snowboarding. There were another five people who competed in para-alpine skiing.

The table below contains the list of members of people (called "Team NL") that participated in the 2018 Games.

Team Netherlands
Name	Sport	Gender	Classification	Events	ref
Lisa Bunschoten	para-snowboarding	female	SBLL-2	Cross and Banked Slalom	
Niels de Langen	para-alpine skiing	Male	Sitting	Slalom, giant slalom, super-G, super combined and downhill	
Anna Jochemsen	para-alpine skiing	female	Standing	Slalom, super-G, super combined and downhill	
Jeroen Kampschreur	para-alpine skiing	Male	Sitting	Slalom, giant slalom, super-G, super combined and downhill	
Bibian Mentel-Spee	para-snowboarding	female	SBLL-2	Cross and Banked Slalom	
Jeffrey Stuut	para-alpine skiing	male	Standing	Slalom, giant slalom, super-G, super combined and downhill	
Renske van Beek	para-snowboarding	female	SBLL-2	Cross and Banked Slalom	
Linda van Impelen	para-alpine skiing	female	Sitting	Slalom, giant slalom, super-G and Super Combined	
Chris Vos	para-snowboarding	male	SB-LL1	Cross and Banked Slalom	

== Medalists ==
Medal	Name	Sport	Event	Date
Gold	Bibian Mentel	Snowboarding	Women's snowboard cross (SB-LL2)	12 March
Gold	Jeroen Kampschreur	Alpine skiing	Men's super combined (sitting)	13 March
Gold	Bibian Mentel	Snowboarding	Women's banked slalom (SB-LL2)	16 March
Silver	Lisa Bunschoten	Snowboarding	Women's snowboard cross (SB-LL2)	12 March
Silver	Chris Vos	Snowboarding	Men's snowboard cross (SB-LL1)	12 March
Silver	Linda van Impelen	Alpine skiing	Women's giant slalom (sitting)	14 March
Bronze	Lisa Bunschoten	Snowboarding	Women's banked slalom (SB-LL2)	16 March

Medals by sport
Sport	1st place, gold medalist(s)	2nd place, silver medalist(s)	3rd place, bronze medalist(s)	Total
Alpine skiing	1	1	0	2
Snowboarding	2	2	1	5
Total	3	3	1	7

Medals by date
Day	Date	1st place, gold medalist(s)	2nd place, silver medalist(s)	3rd place, bronze medalist(s)	Total
Day 1	10 March	0	0	0	0
Day 2	11 March	0	0	0	0
Day 3	12 March	1	2	0	3
Day 4	13 March	1	0	0	1
Day 5	14 March	0	1	0	1
Day 6	15 March	0	0	0	0
Day 7	16 March	1	0	1	2
Day 8	17 March	0	0	0	0
Day 9	18 March	0	0	0	0

== Para-alpine skiing ==
Anna Jochemsen and Jeffrey Stuut are standing skiers. Linda van Impelen, Jeroen Kampschreur and Niels de Langen have all competed in all 5 para-alpine sit-ski events. Kampschreur went to his first Winter Paralympics as the world champion in slalom, giant slalom and super-combined.

Men

Athlete	Event	Class	Run 1		Run 2		Final/Total	
Athlete	Event	Class	Time	Rank	Time	Rank	Time	Rank
Jeroen Kampschreur	Downhill	Sitting	—N/a				Did not finish	
Niels de Langen	Downhill	Sitting	—N/a				1:31.40	14
Jeffrey Stuut	Downhill	Standing	—N/a				1:33.14	19
Jeroen Kampschreur	Slalom	Sitting	48.40	1	Did not finish			
Niels de Langen	Slalom	Sitting	Did not finish					
Jeffrey Stuut	Slalom	Standing	Did not finish					
Jeroen Kampschreur	Super combined	Sitting	1:25.55	3	46.04	1	2:11.59	1st place, gold medalist(s)
Niels de Langen	Super combined	Sitting	1:29.47	11	48.87	4	2:18.34	8
Jeffrey Stuut	Super combined	Standing	1:30.06	12	Did not finish			
Jeroen Kampschreur	Super-G	Sitting	—N/a				1:27.63	7
Niels de Langen	Super-G	Sitting	—N/a				1:29.85	14
Jeffrey Stuut	Super-G	Standing	—N/a				1:31.31	17

Women

Athlete	Event	Class	Run 1		Run 2		Final/Total	
Athlete	Event	Class	Time	Rank	Time	Rank	Time	Rank
Anna Jochemsen	Downhill	Standing	—N/a				Did not finish	
Linda van Impelen	Giant slalom	Sitting	1:14.87	2	1:14.37	8	2:29.24	2nd place, silver medalist(s)
Anna Jochemsen	Slalom	Standing	1:01.05	7	1:02.79	5	2:03.84	7
Linda van Impelen	Slalom	Sitting	1:03.92	7	1:02.79	5	Disqualified	
Anna Jochemsen	Super combined	Standing	1:37.47	5	Did not finish			
Linda van Impelen	Super combined	Sitting	1:39.08	7	Disqualified			
Anna Jochemsen	Super-G	Standing	—N/a				1:39.90	6
Linda van Impelen	Super-G	Sitting	—N/a				1:42.83	7

== Para-snowboarding ==
Bibian Mentel-Spee has competed at the Paralympics before, winning several medals. Chris Vos won the World Para Snowboarding Championships four times. Lisa Bunschoten, Mentel-Spee and Vos all competed at the 2014 Winter Paralympics in Sochi. Renske van Beek was the only snowboarded on Team Netherlands who did not go to Sochi. The South Korea Games are her first.

Chris Vos celebrated his 20th birthday in February. Despite his young age, people thought he could win a medal at the 2018 Winter Games. During the 2017-2018 snowboarding season, his results were not consistent but his speed was very good. The lack of consistency was why some people thought he might not be able to win gold.

Banked slalom

Athlete	Event	Run 1	Run 2	Run 3	Best	Rank
Chris Vos	Men's (SB-LL1)	59.24	54.28	DNF	54.28	4
Renske van Beek	Women's (SB-LL1)	1:16.85	1:04.14	1:02.21	1:02.21	4
Lisa Bunschoten	Women's (SB-LL1)	1:04.18	1:00.04	1:01.40	1:00.04	3rd place, bronze medalist(s)
Bibian Mentel-Spee	Women's (SB-LL1)	1:02.25	1:00.42	56.94	56.94	1st place, gold medalist(s)

Snowboardcross

Athlete	Event	Qualification		Round of 16	Quarterfinal	Semifinal	Final / BM	
Athlete	Event	Time	Rank	Opposition Time	Opposition Time	Opposition Time	Opposition Time	Rank
Chris Vos	Men's SB-LL1	1:03.13	3 Q	Bye	Oguri (JPN); W	Schett (AUT); W	Schultz (USA); L	2nd place, silver medalist(s)
Renske van Beek	Women's SB-LL2	1:14.57	3 q	—N/a	Coury (USA); W	Bunschoten (NED); L	Fina Paredes (ESP); L	4
Lisa Bunschoten	Women's SB-LL2	1:13.59	2 Q	—N/a	Bye	van Beek (NED); W	Mentel-Spee (NED); L	2nd place, silver medalist(s)
Bibian Mentel-Spee	Women's SB-LL2	1:07.51	1 Q	—N/a	Bye	Fina Paredes (ESP); W	Bunschoten (NED); W	1st place, gold medalist(s)

== Supporters ==
Princess Margriet of the Netherlands attended the 2018 Winter Paralympics. She is a member of the Honorary Board of the International Paralympic Committee. She arrived 8 March 2018 and left 13 March 2018.
