= Snowboard at the 2018 Winter Paralympics – Women's banked slalom =

Women's banked slalom at the XII Paralympic Winter Games
- Paralympic snowboarding
- Venue: Jeongseon Alpine Centre, South Korea
- Dates: 16 March
- Competitors: 13 from 6 nations

Women's banked slalom SB-LL1 at the XII Paralympic Winter Games
- Competitors: 5 from 3 nations

Medalists
1st place, gold medalist(s)		Brenna Huckaby	United States
2nd place, silver medalist(s)		Cécile Hernandez	France
3rd place, bronze medalist(s)		Amy Purdy	United States

Women's banked slalom SB-LL2 at the XII Paralympic Winter Games
- Competitors: 8 from 5 nations

Medalists
1st place, gold medalist(s)		Bibian Mentel-Spee	Netherlands
2nd place, silver medalist(s)		Brittani Coury	United States
3rd place, bronze medalist(s)		Lisa Bunschoten	Netherlands

The women's banked slalom competition of the 2018 Winter Paralympics was held at Jeongseon Alpine Centre, South Korea. The competition took place on 16 March 2018.

== Medal table ==
Rank	Nation	Gold	Silver	Bronze	Total
1	United States (USA)	1	1	1	3
2	Netherlands (NED)	1	0	1	2
3	France (FRA)	0	1	0	1
Totals (3 entries)		2	2	2	6

== Banked slalom SB-LL1 ==
The following 5 athletes qualified for the competition.

Rank	Bib	Name	Country	Run 1	Run 2	Run 3	Best
1st place, gold medalist(s)	2	Brenna Huckaby	United States	1:00.23	56.17	57.24	56.17
2nd place, silver medalist(s)	5	Cécile Hernandez	France	1:02.64	1:00.23	56.53	56.53
3rd place, bronze medalist(s)	1	Amy Purdy	United States	1:09.61	1:06.00	1:05.40	1:05.40
4	4	Nicole Roundy	United States	1:09.57	1:05.69	1:07.56	1:05.69
5	3	Michelle Salt	Canada	DSQ	1:23.65	1:07.69	1:07.69

== Banked slalom SB-LL2 ==
The following 8 athletes qualified for the competition.

Rank	Bib	Name	Country	Run 1	Run 2	Run 3	Best
1st place, gold medalist(s)	10	Bibian Mentel-Spee	Netherlands	1:02.25	1:00.42	56.94	56.94
2nd place, silver medalist(s)	7	Brittani Coury	United States	1:05.28	1:00.90	59.87	59.87
3rd place, bronze medalist(s)	13	Lisa Bunschoten	Netherlands	1:04.18	1:00.04	1:01.40	1:00.04
4	12	Renske van Beek	Netherlands	1:16.85	1:04.14	1:02.21	1:02.21
5	9	Astrid Fina	Spain	1:10.54	1:26.35	1:07.11	1:07.11
6	11	Sandrine Hamel	Canada	1:06.92	1:05.53	1:10.50	1:05.53
7	6	Arlene Cohen	United States	1:48.63	1:44.46	1:49.05	1:44.46
8	8	Sedigheh Rouzbeh	Iran	6:30.75	3:29.18	DNS	3:29.18

== See also ==
- Snowboarding at the 2018 Winter Olympics
