= Snowboard at the 2018 Winter Paralympics – Women's snowboard cross =

Women's snowboard cross at the XII Paralympic Winter Games
- Paralympic alpine skiing
- Venue: Jeongseon Alpine Centre, South Korea
- Dates: 12 March
- Competitors: 11 from 5 nations

Women's snowboard cross SB-LL1 at the XII Paralympic Winter Games
- Competitors: 5 from 3 nations

Medalists
1st place, gold medalist(s)		Brenna Huckaby	United States
2nd place, silver medalist(s)		Amy Purdy	United States
3rd place, bronze medalist(s)		Cécile Hernandez	France

Women's snowboard cross SB-LL2 at the XII Paralympic Winter Games
- Competitors: 6 from 4 nations

Medalists
1st place, gold medalist(s)		Bibian Mentel-Spee	Netherlands
2nd place, silver medalist(s)		Lisa Bunschoten	Netherlands
3rd place, bronze medalist(s)		Astrid Fina Paredes	Spain

The women's snowboard cross competition of the 2018 Winter Paralympics was held at Jeongseon Alpine Centre, South Korea. The competition took place on 12 March 2018.

== Medal table ==
The ranking in the table is based on information provided by the International Paralympic Committee (IPC) and will be consistent with IPC convention in its published medal tables. By default, the table will be ordered by the number of gold medals the athletes from a nation have won (in this context, a "nation" is an entity represented by a National Paralympic Committee). The number of silver medals is taken into consideration next and then the number of bronze medals. If nations are still tied, equal ranking is given and they are listed alphabetically by IPC country code.

Rank	Nation	Gold	Silver	Bronze	Total
1	Netherlands (NED)	1	1	0	2
1	United States (USA)	1	1	0	2
3	France (FRA)	0	0	1	1
3	Spain (ESP)	0	0	1	1
Totals (4 entries)		2	2	2	6

== Snowboard cross SB-LL1 ==
=== Qualification ===
The top 4 athletes advanced to the elimination round.

Rank	Bib	Name	Country	Run 1	Run 2	Best	Notes
1	1	Cécile Hernandez	France	1:10.04	1:09.09	1:09.09	Q
2	4	Amy Purdy	United States	1:09.64	1:10.41	1:09.64	Q
3	2	Michelle Salt	Canada	DNF	1:16.93	1:16.93	Q
4	5	Brenna Huckaby	United States	1:17.42	1:17.02	1:17.02	Q
5	3	Nicole Roundy	United States	1:22.46	1:17.77	1:17.77	

=== Elimination round ===
The elimination round was started at 14:27.

Semifinals
1	Hernandez (FRA)
4	Huckaby (USA)	W
2	Purdy (USA)	W
3	Salt (CAN)

Finals
4	Huckaby (USA)	W
2	Purdy (USA)
Third place
1	Hernandez (FRA)	W
3	Salt (CAN)

== Snowboard cross SB-LL2 ==
=== Qualification ===
The qualification was held at 10:35.

Q — Qualified for the semifinals
q — Qualified for the quarterfinals

Rank	Bib	Name	Country	Time	Note
1	6	Bibian Mentel-Spee	Netherlands	1:07.51	Q
2	9	Lisa Bunschoten	Netherlands	1:13.59	Q
3	7	Renske van Beek	Netherlands	1:14.57	q
4	11	Sandrine Hamel	Canada	1:14.78	q
5	10	Astrid Fina Paredes	Spain	1:23.11	q
6	8	Brittani Coury	United States	1:26.39	q

=== Elimination round ===
The elimination round was started at 14:05.

Quarterfinals
4	Hamel (CAN)
5	Fina Paredes (ESP)	W
3	van Beek (NED)	W
6	Coury (USA)

Semifinals
1	Mentel-Spee (NED)	W
5	Fina Paredes (ESP)
3	van Beek (NED)
2	Bunschoten (NED)	W

Final
1	Mentel-Spee (NED)	W
2	Bunschoten (NED)
Third place
5	Fina Paredes (ESP)	W
3	van Beek (NED)

== See also ==
- Snowboarding at the 2018 Winter Olympics
