= Alpine skiing at the 2018 Winter Paralympics – Women's super-G =

Women's super-G at the XII Paralympic Winter Games
- Paralympic alpine skiing
- Venue: Jeongseon Alpine Centre, South Korea
- Dates: 11 March 2018
- Competitors: 33 from 15 nations

Women's super-G (visually impaired) at the XII Paralympic Winter Games
- Competitors: 11 from 8 nations

Medalists
1st place, gold medalist(s)		Henrieta Farkašová; Guide: Natália Šubrtová	Slovakia
2nd place, silver medalist(s)		Millie Knight; Guide: Brett Wild	Great Britain
3rd place, bronze medalist(s)		Menna Fitzpatrick; Guide: Jennifer Kehoe	Great Britain

Women's super-G (standing) at the XII Paralympic Winter Games
- Competitors: 14 from 7 nations

Medalists
1st place, gold medalist(s)		Marie Bochet	France
2nd place, silver medalist(s)		Andrea Rothfuß	Germany
3rd place, bronze medalist(s)		Alana Ramsay	Canada

Women's super-G (sitting) at the XII Paralympic Winter Games
- Competitors: 8 from 7 nations

Medalists
1st place, gold medalist(s)		Anna Schaffelhuber	Germany
2nd place, silver medalist(s)		Claudia Lösch	Austria
3rd place, bronze medalist(s)		Momoka Muraoka	Japan

The Women's super -G competition of the 2018 Winter Paralympics was held at Jeongseon Alpine Centre, South Korea. The competition took place on 11 March 2018.

== Visually impaired ==
In the super-G visually impaired, the athlete with a visual impairment has a sighted guide. The two skiers are considered a team, and dual medals are awarded.

The race was started at 09:30.

Rank	Bib	Name	Country	Time	Difference
1st place, gold medalist(s)	3	Henrieta Farkašová; Guide: Natália Šubrtová	Slovakia	1:30.17	
2nd place, silver medalist(s)	1	Millie Knight; Guide: Brett Wild	Great Britain	1:33.76	+3.59
3rd place, bronze medalist(s)	2	Menna Fitzpatrick; Guide: Jennifer Kehoe	Great Britain	1:34.54	+4.37
4	6	Eléonor Sana; Guide: Chloe Sana	Belgium	1:36.00	+5.83
5	5	Melissa Perrine; Guide: Christian Geiger	Australia	1:36.96	+6.79
6	7	Danelle Umstead; Guide: Rob Umstead	United States	1:38.91	+8.74
7	4	Noemi Ewa Ristau; Guide: Lucien Gerkau	Germany	1:39.09	+8.92
8	11	Kelly Gallagher; Guide: Gary Smith	Great Britain	1:39.75	+9.58
9	10	Yang Jae-rim; Guide: Ko Un-so-ri	South Korea	1:43.03	+12.86
10	9	Staci Mannella; Guide: Sadie de Baun	United States	1:44.25	+14.08
11	8	Anna Pešková; Guide: Michaela Hubačová	Czech Republic	1:47.76	+17.59

== Standing ==
The race was started at 09:52.

Rank	Bib	Name	Country	Time	Difference
1st place, gold medalist(s)	14	Marie Bochet	France	1:32.83	
2nd place, silver medalist(s)	20	Andrea Rothfuß	Germany	1:33.10	+0.27
3rd place, bronze medalist(s)	15	Alana Ramsay	Canada	1:35.20	+2.37
4	16	Mollie Jepsen	Canada	1:36.22	+3.39
5	13	Maria Papulova	Neutral Paralympic Athletes	1:37.11	+4.28
6	12	Anna Jochemsen	Netherlands	1:39.90	+7.07
7	17	Ally Kunkel	United States	1:40.74	+7.91
8	24	Melanie Schwartz	United States	1:42.77	+9.94
9	18	Erin Latimer	Canada	1:43.13	+10.30
10	19	Stephanie Jallen	United States	1:44.30	+11.47
11	23	Mel Pemble	Canada	1:44.63	+11.80
	21	Petra Smaržová	Slovakia	DNF	
	22	Ammi Hondo	Japan	DNF	
	25	Frederique Turgeon	Canada	DNF	

== Sitting ==
The race was started at 10:32.

Rank	Bib	Name	Country	Time	Difference
1st place, gold medalist(s)	32	Anna Schaffelhuber	Germany	1:34.76	
2nd place, silver medalist(s)	27	Claudia Lösch	Austria	1:35.71	+0.95
3rd place, bronze medalist(s)	26	Momoka Muraoka	Japan	1:36.10	+1.34
4	31	Anna-Lena Forster	Germany	1:36.26	+1.50
5	28	Laurie Stephens	United States	1:36.98	+2.22
6	30	Stephani Victor	Switzerland	1:40.01	+5.25
7	29	Linda van Impelen	Netherlands	1:42.83	+8.07
	33	Victoria Prendergast	Australia	DNF	

== See also ==
- Alpine skiing at the 2018 Winter Olympics
