= Canada at the 2018 Winter Paralympics =

- Flag of Canada
- IPC code: CAN
- NPC: Canadian Paralympic Committee
- Website: www.paralympic.ca

in Pyeongchang, South Korea 9-18 March 2018
- Competitors: 55 in 6 sports
- Flag bearers: Brian McKeever (opening); Mark Arendz (closing)
- Medals Ranked 3rd: Gold 8 Silver 4 Bronze 16 Total 28

Winter Paralympics appearances (overview)
- 1976; 1980; 1984; 1988; 1992; 1994; 1998; 2002; 2006; 2010; 2014; 2018; 2022; 2026

Canada competed at the 2018 Winter Paralympics in Pyeongchang, South Korea, from 9 to 18 March 2018. Canada sent a team of 55 athletes to compete in all six sports. The chef de mission was retired sledge hockey player Todd Nicholson, appointed in January 2017.

Canada finished the Games with eight gold medals and 28 overall (ranking 3rd and 2nd, respectively). It was the most successful Canadian performance in terms of total medals, surpassing the 19 won at the 2010 Winter Paralympics. This also met the goal set by the Canadian Paralympic Committee to improve on the 16 medals won at the 2014 Winter Paralympics.

Opening ceremony flag-bearer Brian McKeever became Canada's most decorated Winter Paralympian after winning his 14th career medal at the Games, surpassing the previous record by Lana Spreeman, who won 13 medals between 1980 and 1994. He finished the Games with three gold and a bronze, for a career total of 13 gold medals and 17 medals in all, making him also the most decorated Paralympic cross-country skier ever.

Mark Arendz won a Canadian single Games record 6 medals (5 individual and a team relay medal), and was honoured as Canada's flag-bearer for the Games closing ceremony.

== Medallists ==
Medals by sport
| Sport | 1st place, gold medalist(s) | 2nd place, silver medalist(s) | 3rd place, bronze medalist(s) | Total |
| Cross-country skiing | 4 | 1 | 5 | 10 |
| Alpine skiing | 3 | 1 | 6 | 10 |
| Biathlon | 1 | 1 | 4 | 6 |
| Para ice hockey | 0 | 1 | 0 | 1 |
| Wheelchair curling | 0 | 0 | 1 | 1 |
| Snowboarding | 0 | 0 | 0 | 0 |
| Total | 8 | 4 | 16 | 28 |

Medals by date
| Day | Date | 1st place, gold medalist(s) | 2nd place, silver medalist(s) | 3rd place, bronze medalist(s) | Total |
| Day 1 | 10 March | 1 | 1 | 2 | 4 |
| Day 2 | 11 March | 1 | 0 | 1 | 2 |
| Day 3 | 12 March | 1 | 0 | 0 | 1 |
| Day 4 | 13 March | 1 | 0 | 2 | 3 |
| Day 5 | 14 March | 1 | 0 | 5 | 6 |
| Day 6 | 15 March | 0 | 0 | 0 | 0 |
| Day 7 | 16 March | 1 | 0 | 2 | 3 |
| Day 8 | 17 March | 2 | 0 | 3 | 5 |
| Day 9 | 18 March | 0 | 3 | 1 | 4 |
| Total | | 8 | 4 | 16 | 28 |

Medals by gender
| Gender | 1st place, gold medalist(s) | 2nd place, silver medalist(s) | 3rd place, bronze medalist(s) | Total |
| Male | 6 | 1 | 7 | 14 |
| Female | 2 | 1 | 7 | 10 |
| Mixed | 0 | 2 | 2 | 4 |
| Total | 8 | 4 | 16 | 28 |

Multiple medalists
| Name | Sport | 1st place, gold medalist(s) | 2nd place, silver medalist(s) | 3rd place, bronze medalist(s) | Total |
| Brian McKeever | Cross-country skiing | 3 | 0 | 1 | 4 |
| Mark Arendz | Biathlon / Cross-country skiing | 1 | 2 | 3 | 6 |
| Mollie Jepsen | Alpine skiing | 1 | 1 | 2 | 4 |
| Natalie Wilkie | Cross-country skiing | 1 | 1 | 1 | 3 |
| Mac Marcoux | Alpine skiing | 1 | 0 | 1 | 2 |
| Emily Young | Cross-country skiing | 0 | 1 | 1 | 2 |
| Collin Cameron | Biathlon | 0 | 0 | 3 | 3 |
| Alana Ramsay | Alpine skiing | 0 | 0 | 2 | 2 |

| Medal | Name | Sport | Event | Date |
|---|---|---|---|---|
| Gold | Mac Marcoux; Guide: Jack Leitch | Alpine skiing | Men's downhill, visually impaired | March 10 |
| Gold | Kurt Oatway | Alpine skiing | Men's super-G, sitting | March 11 |
| Gold | Brian McKeever; Guide: Graham Nishikawa | Cross-country skiing | Men's 20 km free, visually impaired | March 12 |
| Gold | Mollie Jepsen | Alpine skiing | Women's super combined, standing | March 13 |
| Gold | Brian McKeever; Guide: Russell Kennedy | Cross-country skiing | Men's 1.5 km sprint classic, visually impaired | March 14 |
| Gold | Mark Arendz | Biathlon | Men's 15 km, standing | March 16 |
| Gold | Brian McKeever; Guide: Graham Nishikawa | Cross-country skiing | Men's 10 km classic, visually impaired | March 17 |
| Gold | Natalie Wilkie | Cross-country skiing | Women's 7.5 km classic, standing | March 17 |
| Silver | Mark Arendz | Biathlon | Men's 7.5 km, standing | March 10 |
| Silver | Mark Arendz; Chris Klebl; Natalie Wilkie; Emily Young | Cross-country skiing | 4 x 2.5 km mixed relay | March 18 |
| Silver | Mollie Jepsen | Alpine skiing | Women's slalom, standing | March 18 |
| Silver | Canada national ice sledge hockey team: Rob Armstrong; Steve Arsenault; Bradley Bowden; Billy Bridges; Dominic Cozzolino; Ben Delaney; Adam Dixon; James Dunn; James Gemmell; Tyrone Henry; Liam Hickey; Dominic Larocque; Tyler McGregor; Bryan Sholomicki; Corbyn Smith; Corbin Watson; Greg Westlake | Para ice hockey | Mixed | March 18 |
| Bronze | Mollie Jepsen | Alpine skiing | Women's downhill, standing | March 10 |
| Bronze | Collin Cameron | Biathlon | Men's 7.5 km, sitting | March 10 |
| Bronze | Alana Ramsay | Alpine skiing | Women's super-G, standing | March 11 |
| Bronze | Mark Arendz | Biathlon | Men's 12.5 km, standing | March 13 |
| Bronze | Alana Ramsay | Alpine skiing | Women's super combined, standing | March 13 |
| Bronze | Mark Arendz | Cross-country skiing | Men's 1.5 km sprint classic, standing | March 14 |
| Bronze | Natalie Wilkie | Cross-country skiing | Women's 1.5 km sprint classic, standing | March 14 |
| Bronze | Mollie Jepsen | Alpine skiing | Women's giant slalom, standing | March 14 |
| Bronze | Mac Marcoux; Guide: Jack Leitch | Alpine skiing | Men's giant slalom, visually impaired | March 14 |
| Bronze | Alexis Guimond | Alpine skiing | Men's giant slalom, standing | March 14 |
| Bronze | Collin Cameron | Biathlon | Men's 15 km, sitting | March 16 |
| Bronze | Brittany Hudak | Biathlon | Women's 12.5 km, standing | March 16 |
| Bronze | Mark Arendz | Cross-country skiing | Men's 10 km classic, standing | March 17 |
| Bronze | Mark Ideson; Ina Forrest; Dennis Thiessen; Marie Wright; James Anseeuw | Wheelchair curling | Mixed | March 17 |
| Bronze | Emily Young | Cross-country skiing | Women's 7.5 km classic, standing | March 17 |
| Bronze | Collin Cameron; Brian McKeever; Guides: Russell Kennedy, Graham Nishikawa | Cross-country skiing | 4 x 2.5 km open relay | March 18 |

== Competitors ==
The following is the list of number of competitors participating at the Games per sport/discipline.

| Sport | Men | Women | Total |
|---|---|---|---|
| Alpine skiing | 7 | 5 | 12 |
| Biathlon / Cross-country skiing | 10 | 4 | 14 |
| Para ice hockey | 17 | 0 | 17 |
| Snowboarding | 5 | 2 | 7 |
| Wheelchair curling | 3 | 2 | 5 |
| Total | 42 | 13 | 55 |

== Alpine skiing ==
On 16 February 2018, Alpine Canada announced the nominations of 12 athletes (seven men and five women) to Team Canada.

Men

| Athlete | Event | Run 1 | | Run 2 | | Total | |
| Athlete | Event | Time | Rank | Time | Rank | Time | Rank |
|---|---|---|---|---|---|---|---|
| Alex Cairns | Giant slalom, sitting | 1:12.45 | 15 | 1:11.07 | 14 | 2:23.52 | 14 |
| Alex Cairns | Slalom, sitting | 59.47 | 13 | 57.47 | 10 | 1:56.94 | 10 |
| Alexis Guimond | Downhill, standing | —N/a | | | | 1:27.09 | 4 |
| Alexis Guimond | Giant slalom, standing | 1:08.23 | 6 | 1:05.44 | 1 | 2:13.67 | 3rd place, bronze medalist(s) |
| Alexis Guimond | Slalom, standing | DNF | | did not advance | | | |
| Alexis Guimond | Super-G, standing | —N/a | | | | 1:28.01 | 4 |
| Braydon Luscombe | Downhill, standing | —N/a | | | | DNF | |
| Braydon Luscombe | Giant slalom, standing | 1:12.53 | 21 | did not start | | | |
| Braydon Luscombe | Slalom, standing | DNF | | did not advance | | | |
| Braydon Luscombe | Super combined, standing | DNF | | did not advance | | | |
| Braydon Luscombe | Super-G, standing | —N/a | | | | 1:29.39 | 8 |
| Mac Marcoux; Guide: Jack Leitch | Downhill, visually impaired | —N/a | | | | 1:23.93 | 1st place, gold medalist(s) |
| Mac Marcoux; Guide: Jack Leitch | Giant slalom, visually impaired | 1:09.44 | 4 | 1:08.07 | 3 | 2:17.51 | 3rd place, bronze medalist(s) |
| Mac Marcoux; Guide: Jack Leitch | Slalom, visually impaired | 49.61 | 5 | 48.78 | 3 | 1:38.39 | 4 |
| Mac Marcoux; Guide: Jack Leitch | Super combined, visually impaired | DNF | | did not advance | | | |
| Mac Marcoux; Guide: Jack Leitch | Super-G, visually impaired | —N/a | | | | DNF | |
| Kurt Oatway | Downhill, sitting | —N/a | | | | 1:27.50 | 8 |
| Kurt Oatway | Giant slalom, sitting | 1:12.56 | 16 | 1:09.85 | 11 | 2:22.41 | 12 |
| Kurt Oatway | Slalom, sitting | DNF | | did not advance | | | |
| Kurt Oatway | Super combined, sitting | DNF | | did not advance | | | |
| Kurt Oatway | Super-G, sitting | —N/a | | | | 1:25.83 | 1st place, gold medalist(s) |
| Kirk Schornstein | Downhill, standing | —N/a | | | | 1:28.53 | 6 |
| Kirk Schornstein | Giant slalom, standing | 1:10.78 | 16 | 1:10.46 | 13 | 2:21.24 | 13 |
| Kirk Schornstein | Slalom, standing | DNF | | did not advance | | | |
| Kirk Schornstein | Super combined, standing | 1:28.67 | 5 | 49.99 | 9 | 2:18.66 | 9 |
| Kirk Schornstein | Super-G, standing | —N/a | | | | 1:29.28 | 7 |

Women

| Athlete | Event | Run 1 | | Run 2 | | Total | |
| Athlete | Event | Time | Rank | Time | Rank | Time | Rank |
|---|---|---|---|---|---|---|---|
| Mollie Jepsen | Downhill, standing | —N/a | | | | 1:34.60 | 3rd place, bronze medalist(s) |
| Mollie Jepsen | Giant slalom, standing | 1:14.44 | 3 | 1:11.28 | 2 | 2:25.72 | 3rd place, bronze medalist(s) |
| Mollie Jepsen | Slalom, standing | 58.36 | 2 | 1:01.23 | 2 | 1:59.59 | 2nd place, silver medalist(s) |
| Mollie Jepsen | Super combined, standing | 1:34.00 | 2 | 58.70 | 2 | 2:32.70 | 1st place, gold medalist(s) |
| Mollie Jepsen | Super-G, standing | —N/a | | | | 1:36.22 | 4 |
| Erin Latimer | Downhill, standing | —N/a | | | | 1:38.87 | 6 |
| Erin Latimer | Giant slalom, standing | 1:21.69 | 11 | 1:20.42 | 13 | 2:42.11 | 12 |
| Erin Latimer | Slalom, standing | 1:06.55 | 10 | 1:09.06 | 9 | 2:15.61 | 10 |
| Erin Latimer | Super combined, standing | 1:38.65 | 6 | 1:04.67 | 7 | 2:43.32 | 7 |
| Erin Latimer | Super-G, standing | —N/a | | | | 1:43.13 | 9 |
| Mel Pemble | Downhill, standing | —N/a | | | | 1:42.22 | 9 |
| Mel Pemble | Giant slalom, standing | 1:22.45 | 12 | 1:18.91 | 11 | 2:41.36 | 11 |
| Mel Pemble | Slalom, standing | DNF | | did not advance | | | |
| Mel Pemble | Super combined, standing | 1:42.90 | 11 | 1:07.23 | 8 | 2:50.13 | 9 |
| Mel Pemble | Super-G, standing | —N/a | | | | 1:44.63 | 11 |
| Alana Ramsay | Downhill, standing | —N/a | | | | 1:35.21 | 4 |
| Alana Ramsay | Giant slalom, standing | 1:15.78 | 4 | 1:13.48 | 4 | 2:29.26 | 4 |
| Alana Ramsay | Slalom, standing | 59.62 | 6 | 1:03.94 | 6 | 2:03.56 | 6 |
| Alana Ramsay | Super combined, standing | 1:34.25 | 3 | 1:01.83 | 6 | 2:36.08 | 3rd place, bronze medalist(s) |
| Alana Ramsay | Super-G, standing | —N/a | | | | 1:35.20 | 3rd place, bronze medalist(s) |
| Frédérique Turgeon | Downhill, standing | —N/a | | | | DNF | |
| Frédérique Turgeon | Giant slalom, standing | 1:19.42 | 9 | 1:17.52 | 10 | 2:36.94 | 9 |
| Frédérique Turgeon | Slalom, standing | 1:06.74 | 11 | DNF | | did not advance | |
| Frédérique Turgeon | Super combined, standing | DNF | | did not advance | | | |
| Frédérique Turgeon | Super-G, standing | —N/a | | | | DNF | |

== Biathlon ==
Men

| Athlete | Events | Final | | | | |
| Athlete | Events | Real Time | Calculated Time | Missed Shots | Result | Rank |
|---|---|---|---|---|---|---|
| Mark Arendz | 7.5 km, standing | 19:24.1 | 18:25.9 | 0 (0+0) | 18:25.9 | 2nd place, silver medalist(s) |
| Mark Arendz | 12.5 km, standing | 37:48.1 | 35:54.7 | 1 (0+0+0+1) | 35:54.7 | 3rd place, bronze medalist(s) |
| Mark Arendz | 15 km, standing | 45:07.6 | 42:52.2 | 0 (0+0+0+0) | 42:52.2 | 1st place, gold medalist(s) |
| Collin Cameron | 7.5 km, sitting | 24:59.0 | 23:59.0 | 1 (0+1) | 23:59.0 | 3rd place, bronze medalist(s) |
| Collin Cameron | 15 km, sitting | 52:04.1 | 49:59.1 | 1 (0+1+0+0) | 50:59.1 | 3rd place, bronze medalist(s) |
| Derek Zaplotinsky | 7.5 km, sitting | 28:06.4 | 25:17.8 | 1 (0+1) | 25:17.8 | 9 |
| Derek Zaplotinsky | 12.5 km, sitting | 59:54.9 | 53:55.4 | 5 (2+1+1+1) | 53:55.4 | 12 |

Women

| Athlete | Events | Final | | | | |
| Athlete | Events | Real Time | Calculated Time | Missed Shots | Result | Rank |
|---|---|---|---|---|---|---|
| Brittany Hudak | 6 km, standing | 20:11.0 | 19:22.6 | 2 (1+1) | 19:22.6 | 8 |
| Brittany Hudak | 10 km, standing | 41:21.2 | 39:42.0 | 1 (0+0+0+1) | 39:42.0 | 5 |
| Brittany Hudak | 12.5 km, standing | 43:04.1 | 41:20.7 | 0 (0+0+0+0) | 41:20.7 | 3rd place, bronze medalist(s) |
| Emily Young | 6 km, standing | 20:08.6 | 19:08.2 | 1 (0+1) | 19:08.2 | 7 |
| Emily Young | 12.5 km, standing | 43:28.9 | 41:18.5 | 2 (1+0+1+0) | 41:18.5 | 7 |

== Cross-country skiing ==
On 16 February 2018, Cross Country Canada announced the 14 athletes (ten men and four women) nominated to Team Canada. The team is expected to consist of 12 skiers and two guides including returning medallists Mark Arendz, Chris Klebl, and Brian McKeever with his guides Graham Nishikawa and Russell Kennedy. Kennedy competed in cross-country skiing at the 2018 Winter Olympics. Cindy Ouellet was part of Team Canada at the Summer Paralympics, where she played wheelchair basketball. It will also be the first Games for Collin Cameron and Emily Young, the latter a former wrestler before doing para-Nordic skiing.

Men

| Athlete | Event | Qualification | | | Semifinal | | Final | | |
| Athlete | Event | Real Time | Result | Rank | Result | Rank | Real Time | Result | Rank |
|---|---|---|---|---|---|---|---|---|---|
| Mark Arendz | 1.5 km sprint classic, standing | 4:03.34 | 3:39.01 | 3 | 4:53.7 | 2 | 4:20.8 | 4:20.8 | 3rd place, bronze medalist(s) |
| Mark Arendz | 10 km classic, standing | —N/a | | | | | 27:10.1 | 24:27.1 | 3rd place, bronze medalist(s) |
| Yves Bourque | 1.1 km sprint, sitting | 4:02.40 | 3:47.86 | 29 | did not qualify | | | | |
| Yves Bourque | 7.5 km, sitting | —N/a | | | | | 32:42.2 | 30:44.5 | 31 |
| Yves Bourque | 15 km, sitting | —N/a | | | | | 55:52.9 | 52:31.7 | 25 |
| Collin Cameron | 1.1 km sprint, sitting | 3:09.17 | 3:01.60 | 2 | 3:46.4 | 2 | 3:32.1 | 3:32.1 | 4 |
| Collin Cameron | 15 km, sitting | —N/a | | | | | 45:30.1 | 43:40.9 | 5 |
| Sébastien Fortier | 1.1 km sprint, sitting | 3:29.03 | 3:20.67 | 17 | did not qualify | | | | |
| Sébastien Fortier | 7.5 km, sitting | —N/a | | | | | 26:44.7 | 25:40.5 | 16 |
| Sébastien Fortier | 15 km, sitting | —N/a | | | | | 48:22.1 | 46:26.0 | 18 |
| Ethan Hess | 1.1 km sprint, sitting | 3:44.53 | 3:44.53 | 27 | did not qualify | | | | |
| Ethan Hess | 7.5 km, sitting | —N/a | | | | | 28:51.0 | 28:51.0 | 28 |
| Ethan Hess | 15 km, sitting | —N/a | | | | | 52:14.6 | 52:14.6 | 24 |
| Chris Klebl | 1.1 km sprint, sitting | 3:26.25 | 3:13.88 | 9 | 3:53.3 | 6 | did not advance | | |
| Chris Klebl | 7.5 km, sitting | —N/a | | | | | 24:55.2 | 23:25.5 | 6 |
| Chris Klebl | 15 km, sitting | —N/a | | | | | 46:42.1 | 43:54.0 | 8 |
| Brian McKeever; Guides: Russell Kennedy, Graham Nishikawa | 1.5 km sprint classic, visually impaired | 3:33.81 | 3:33.81 | 2 | 4:10.3 | 1 | 4:03.2 | 4:03.2 | 1st place, gold medalist(s) |
| Brian McKeever; Guides: Russell Kennedy, Graham Nishikawa | 10 km classic, visually impaired | —N/a | | | | | 23:17.8 | 23:17.8 | 1st place, gold medalist(s) |
| Brian McKeever; Guides: Russell Kennedy, Graham Nishikawa | 20 km free, visually impaired | —N/a | | | | | 46:02.4 | 46:02.4 | 1st place, gold medalist(s) |
| Derek Zaplotinsky | 1.1 km sprint, sitting | 3:36.34 | 3:14.71 | 10 | 3:57.7 | 6 | did not advance | | |
| Derek Zaplotinsky | 7.5 km, sitting | —N/a | | | | | 28:12.4 | 25:23.2 | 15 |
| Derek Zaplotinsky | 15 km, sitting | —N/a | | | | | 48:57.4 | 44:03.7 | 9 |

Women

| Athlete | Event | Qualification | | | Semifinal | | Final | | |
| Athlete | Event | Real Time | Result | Rank | Result | Rank | Real Time | Result | Rank |
|---|---|---|---|---|---|---|---|---|---|
| Brittany Hudak | 1.5 km sprint classic, standing | 4:59.26 | 4:32.33 | 5 | 5:24.8 | 2 | 6:00.3 | 6:00.3 | 6 |
| Brittany Hudak | 7.5 km classic, standing | —N/a | | | | | 26:11.0 | 23:49.6 | 8 |
| Cindy Ouellet | 1.1 km sprint, sitting | 4:22.12 | 4:11.64 | 17 | did not qualify | | | | |
| Cindy Ouellet | 5 km, sitting | —N/a | | | | | 21:38.5 | 20:46.6 | 17 |
| Cindy Ouellet | 12 km, sitting | —N/a | | | | | 51:28.2 | 49:24.7 | 18 |
| Natalie Wilkie | 1.5 km sprint classic, standing | 4:51.85 | 4:25.58 | 2 | 5:54.4 | 1 | 5:14.3 | 5:14.3 | 3rd place, bronze medalist(s) |
| Natalie Wilkie | 7.5 km classic, standing | —N/a | | | | | 24:24.0 | 22:12.2 | 1st place, gold medalist(s) |
| Natalie Wilkie | 15 km free, standing | —N/a | | | | | 54:23.4 | 52:12.9 | 6 |
| Emily Young | 1.5 km sprint classic, standing | 4:58.06 | 4:28.25 | 3 | 5:55.5 | 2 | 5:18.3 | 5:18.3 | 4 |
| Emily Young | 7.5 km classic, standing | —N/a | | | | | 24:42.1 | 22:13.9 | 3rd place, bronze medalist(s) |
| Emily Young | 15 km free, standing | —N/a | | | | | 54:35.2 | 51:51.4 | 5 |

Relay

| Athletes | Event | Final | |
| Athletes | Event | Time | Rank |
|---|---|---|---|
| Mark Arendz; Chris Klebl; Natalie Wilkie; Emily Young | 4 x 2.5 km mixed relay | 25:21.9 | 2nd place, silver medalist(s) |
| Collin Cameron; Brian McKeever; Guides: Russell Kennedy, Graham Nishikawa | 4 x 2.5 km open relay | 23:52.4 | 3rd place, bronze medalist(s) |

== Para ice hockey ==
Canada automatically qualified to participate in the Games after placing in the top 5 at the 2017 World Para Ice Hockey Championships in South Korea. On 11 February 2018, Hockey Canada announced the 17 players nominated for the sledge hockey team, selected and headed by coach Ken Babey.

Summary

Key:

- OT – Overtime
- GWS – Match decided by penalty-shootout

| Team | Event | Group Stage | | | | Semifinal / Pl. | Final / BM / Pl. | |
| Team | Event | Opposition Score | Opposition Score | Opposition Score | Rank | Opposition Score | Opposition Score | Rank |
|---|---|---|---|---|---|---|---|---|
| Canada men's | Mixed | Sweden; W 17–0 | Italy; W 10–0 | Norway; W 8–0 | 1 QS | South Korea; W 7–0 | United States; L 1–2 OT | 2nd place, silver medalist(s) |

Roster

Head coach: (Canada) Ken Babey Assistant coaches: (Canada) Danny Lynch, (Canada) Luke Pierce

| No. | Pos. | Name | Height | Weight | Birthdate | Hometown | 2017–18 team |
|---|---|---|---|---|---|---|---|
| 31 | G | Dominic Larocque | 6 ft 0 in (183 cm) | 173 lb (78 kg) | 30 July 1987 | Quebec City, QC | Team Canada |
| 30 | G | Corbin Watson | 5 ft 11 in (180 cm) | 184 lb (83 kg) | 6 January 1987 | Kingsville, ON | Team Canada |
| 14 | D | Steve Arsenault | 5 ft 7 in (170 cm) | 177 lb (80 kg) | 6 September 1988 | Spruce Grove, AB | Team Canada |
| 27 | D | Bradley Bowden | 5 ft 0 in (152 cm) | 158 lb (72 kg) | 26 May 1983 | Orton, ON | Team Canada |
| 11 | D | Adam Dixon | 5 ft 9 in (175 cm) | 180 lb (82 kg) | 13 August 1989 | Midland, ON | Team Canada |
| 25 | D | James Gemmell | 5 ft 11 in (180 cm) | 140 lb (64 kg) | 26 April 1980 | Quesnel, BC | Team Canada |
| 5 | D | Tyrone Henry | 6 ft 0 in (183 cm) | 155 lb (70 kg) | 21 October 1993 | Ottawa, ON | Team Canada |
| 6 | F | Rob Armstrong | 5 ft 10 in (178 cm) | 146 lb (66 kg) | 12 September 1996 | Mississauga, ON | Team Canada |
| 18 | F | Billy Bridges | 5 ft 8 in (173 cm) | 190 lb (86 kg) | 22 March 1984 | Summerside, PE | Team Canada |
| 19 | F | Dominic Cozzolino | 5 ft 9 in (175 cm) | 151 lb (68 kg) | 23 August 1994 | Mississauga, ON | Team Canada |
| 10 | F | Ben Delaney | 5 ft 11 in (180 cm) | 143 lb (65 kg) | 23 August 1996 | Ottawa, ON | Team Canada |
| 4 | F | James Dunn | 5 ft 11 in (180 cm) | 156 lb (71 kg) | 12 November 2000 | Wallacetown, ON | Team Canada |
| 23 | F | Liam Hickey | 5 ft 11 in (180 cm) | 138 lb (63 kg) | 25 March 1998 | St. John's, NL | Team Canada |
| 8 | F | Tyler McGregor | 5 ft 8 in (173 cm) | 156 lb (71 kg) | 11 March 1994 | Forest, ON | Team Canada |
| 20 | F | Bryan Sholomicki | 6 ft 2 in (188 cm) | 207 lb (94 kg) | 8 February 1981 | Winnipeg, MB | Team Canada |
| 9 | F | Corbyn Smith | 5 ft 4 in (163 cm) | 129 lb (59 kg) | 5 August 1998 | Monkton, ON | Team Canada |
| 12 | F | Greg Westlake | 6 ft 2 in (188 cm) | 173 lb (78 kg) | 12 June 1986 | Oakville, ON | Team Canada |

Preliminary round

| Pos | Team | Pld | W | OTW | OTL | L | GF | GA | GD | Pts | Qualification |
|---|---|---|---|---|---|---|---|---|---|---|---|
| 1 | Canada | 3 | 3 | 0 | 0 | 0 | 35 | 0 | +35 | 9 | Semifinals |
| 2 | Italy | 3 | 1 | 1 | 0 | 1 | 5 | 12 | −7 | 5 | Semifinals |
| 3 | Norway | 3 | 1 | 0 | 1 | 1 | 5 | 12 | −7 | 4 | 5–8th place semifinals |
| 4 | Sweden | 3 | 0 | 0 | 0 | 3 | 1 | 22 | −21 | 0 | 5–8th place semifinals |

Source: PyeongChang 2018

| 10 March 2018; 19:00 | Canada | 17–0 (7–0, 5–0, 5–0) | Sweden | Gangneung Hockey Centre; Attendance: 5,445 |

Game reference

Corbin Watson
Dominic Larocque
Goalies
Ulf Nilsson
Andreas Nejman
Referee:
(Austria) Kristijan Nikolic
Linesmen:
(South Korea) Han Youl
(Czech Republic) Jan Vaněk

| McGregor (Hickey, Dixon) (PP) – 01:52 | 1–0 |
| Sholomicki (Armstrong, Dunn) – 02:22 | 2–0 |
| McGregor (Westlake, Hickey) – 05:22 | 3–0 |
| Sholomicki (Dunn, Dixon) – 05:39 | 4–0 |
| McGregor (Westlake, Dixon) – 09:20 | 5–0 |
| Dixon (Delaney, Smith) – 11:13 | 6–0 |
| Cozzolino (Delaney, Dixon) – 11:31 | 7–0 |
| Delaney (Armstrong, Cozzolino) (PP) – 17:43 | 8–0 |
| Smith (Sholomicki, Dunn) – 18:06 | 9–0 |
| Hickey (Armstrong, Henry) – 24:37 | 10–0 |
| Hickey (Westlake, McGregor) – 25:37 | 11–0 |
| Armstrong (Sholomicki) – 26:38 | 12–0 |
| Bridges – 31:55 | 13–0 |
| Armstrong (Bridges, Cozzolino) – 33:05 | 14–0 |
| Sholomicki (Smith, Dunn) – 34:53 | 15–0 |
| McGregor (Dixon) – 36:48 | 16–0 |
| Westlake (McGregor, Hickey) – 44:42 | 17–0 |

2 min
Penalties
6 min
45
Shots
2

| 11 March 2018; 19:00 | Canada | 10–0 (3–0, 4–0, 3–0) | Italy | Gangneung Hockey Centre; Attendance: 4,795 |

Game reference

Corbin Watson
Goalies
Santino Stillitano
Referee:
(Japan) Sotaro Yamaguchi
Linesmen:
(Austria) David Nothegger
(Czech Republic) Leon Wesley

| McGregor (Dixon, Westlake) (PP) – 03:59 | 1–0 |
| Dixon (Sholomicki) – 09:21 | 2–0 |
| Delaney (Cozzolino, Armstrong) – 11:36 | 3–0 |
| Hickey (Bridges, Delaney) – 17:03 | 4–0 |
| Hickey – 19:11 | 5–0 |
| Delaney (Sholomicki) (SH) – 20:20 | 6–0 |
| Delaney (Sholomicki) (SH) – 25:34 | 7–0 |
| Cozzolino (Bridges) – 33:06 | 8–0 |
| Dunn (SH) – 36:27 | 9–0 |
| Dunn – 41:23 | 10–0 |

24 min
Penalties
6 min
16
Shots
4

| 12 March 2018; 15:30 | Canada | 8–0 (2–0, 3–0, 3–0) | Norway | Gangneung Hockey Centre; Attendance: 5,886 |

Game reference

Dominic Larocque
Goalies
Kjell Christian Hamar
Referee:
(Austria) Kristijan Nikolic
Linesmen:
(South Korea) Chae Young-jin
(Sweden) Andreas Lundén

| Bridges (Dixon, Arsenault) – 02:33 | 1–0 |
| Armstrong (Cozzolino, Bowden) – 08:47 | 2–0 |
| Hickey (PP) – 26:50 | 3–0 |
| Bowden (Armstrong) – 27:54 | 4–0 |
| Armstrong (Dunn) – 28:49 | 5–0 |
| Bridges (Hickey, Arsenault) – 33:59 | 6–0 |
| Westlake (McGregor) (PP) – 37:21 | 7–0 |
| McGregor (Cozzolino) (SH) – 41:51 | 8–0 |

8 min
Penalties
8 min
27
Shots
5

Semifinal

| 15 March 2018; 12:00 | Canada | 7–0 (4–0, 1–0, 2–0) | South Korea | Gangneung Hockey Centre; Attendance: 6,603 |

Game reference

Corbin Watson
Dominic Larocque
Goalies
Lee Jae-woong
Referee:
(Austria) Kristijan Nikolic
Linesmen:
(Sweden) Andreas Lundén
(Austria) David Nothegger

| Hickey (Bridges) – 04:17 | 1–0 |
| Cozzolino – 06:00 | 2–0 |
| Westlake (Cozzolino, McGregor) – 13:25 | 3–0 |
| Bridges (Delaney, Armstrong) – 14:19 | 4–0 |
| Bridges (McGregor, Dixon) (PP) – 18:42 | 5–0 |
| McGregor (Westlake) – 35:48 | 6–0 |
| McGregor (Armstrong, Cozzolino) – 42:41 | 7–0 |

8 min
Penalties
2 min
24
Shots
2

Gold medal game

| 18 March 2018; 12:00 | Canada | 1–2 OT (1–0, 0–0, 0–1) (OT: 0–1) | United States | Gangneung Hockey Centre; Attendance: 6,096 |

Game reference

Dominic Larocque
Goalies
Steve Cash
Referee:
(Austria) Kristijan Nikolic
Linesmen:
(Sweden) Andreas Lundén
(Austria) David Nothegger

| Bridges (Delaney, Hickey) – 12:06 | 1–0 |
| | 1–1 | 44:22 – Farmer (McKee, Roybal) (EA) |
| | 1–2 | 48:30 – Farmer (Pauls) |

4 min
Penalties
2 min
12
Shots
16

== Snowboarding ==
On 21 February 2018, Canada Snowboard announced the nominations of 7 athletes (five men and two women) to Team Canada.

Banked slalom

| Athlete | Event | Run 1 | | Run 2 | | Run 3 | | Best | |
| Athlete | Event | Time | Rank | Time | Rank | Time | Rank | Time | Rank |
|---|---|---|---|---|---|---|---|---|---|
| Andrew Genge | Men's snowboard banked slalom, SB-UL | 1:00.01 | 11 | 58.95 | 15 | 58.63 | 13 | 58.63 | 17 |
| John Leslie | Men's snowboard banked slalom, SB-LL2 | 57.56 | 11 | 54.10 | 9 | 52.53 | 8 | 52.53 | 8 |
| Colton Liddle | Men's snowboard banked slalom, SB-LL2 | 57.13 | 10 | 56.15 | 12 | 1:06.49 | 15 | 56.15 | 12 |
| Alex Massie | Men's snowboard banked slalom, SB-LL2 | 54.40 | 9 | 54.14 | 11 | 53.28 | 10 | 53.28 | 10 |
| Curt Minard | Men's snowboard banked slalom, SB-UL | 55.13 | 4 | 54.67 | 7 | 55.09 | 6 | 54.67 | 8 |
| Sandrine Hamel | Women's snowboard banked slalom, SB-LL2 | 1:06.92 | 4 | 1:05.53 | 5 | 1:10.50 | 6 | 1:05.53 | 5 |
| Michelle Salt | Women's snowboard banked slalom, SB-LL1 | DSQ | | 1:23.65 | 5 | 1:07.69 | 5 | 1:07.69 | 5 |

Cross

| Athlete | Event | Qualification | | | | | | 1/8 final | Quarterfinal | Semifinal | Final | |
| Athlete | Event | Run 1 | | Run 2 | | Best | Seed | 1/8 final | Quarterfinal | Semifinal | Final | |
| Athlete | Event | Time | Rank | Time | Rank | Best | Seed | Position | Position | Position | Position | Rank |
|---|---|---|---|---|---|---|---|---|---|---|---|---|
| Andrew Genge | Men's snowboard cross, SB-UL | 1:08.90 | 17 | 1:05.74 | 11 | 1:05.74 | 13 Q | 2 | did not advance | | | |
| John Leslie | Men's snowboard cross, SB-LL2 | 1:02.12 | 10 | 1:00.90 | 6 | 1:00.90 | 9 Q | 1 Q | 2 | did not advance | | |
| Colton Liddle | Men's snowboard cross, SB-LL2 | 1:06.33 | 14 | 1:04.68 | 12 | 1:04.68 | 14 Q | 2 | did not advance | | | |
| Alex Massie | Men's snowboard cross, SB-LL2 | 1:02.09 | 9 | 1:01.35 | 8 | 1:01.35 | 10 Q | 2 | did not advance | | | |
| Curt Minard | Men's snowboard cross, SB-UL | 1:02.72 | 4 | 1:02.08 | 2 | 1:02.08 | 2 Q | 1 Q | 2 | did not advance | | |
| Sandrine Hamel | Women's snowboard cross, SB-LL2 | 1:14.78 | 4 | Cancelled | | | | —N/a | 2 | did not advance | | |
| Michelle Salt | Women's snowboard cross, SB-LL1 | DNF | | 1:16.93 | 3 | 1:16.93 | 3 Q | —N/a | Cancelled | 2 FB | 2 | 4 |

Qualification legend: FA – Qualify to medal round; FB – Qualify to consolation round

== Wheelchair curling ==
On 8 December 2017, Curling Canada announced the nominations of 5 athletes (three men and two women) to Team Canada.

Summary

| Team | Event | Group stage | | | | | | | | | | | | Tiebreaker | Semifinal | Final / BM | |
| Team | Event | Opposition Score | Opposition Score | Opposition Score | Opposition Score | Opposition Score | Opposition Score | Opposition Score | Opposition Score | Opposition Score | Opposition Score | Opposition Score | Rank | Opposition Score | Opposition Score | Opposition Score | Rank |
|---|---|---|---|---|---|---|---|---|---|---|---|---|---|---|---|---|---|
| Mark Ideson; Ina Forrest; Dennis Thiessen; Marie Wright; James Anseeuw | Mixed | (Switzerland) SUI; W 8–0 | (Norway) NOR; W 10–1 | (Sweden) SWE; W 8–4 | (South Korea) KOR; L 5–7 | (United Kingdom) GBR; L 1–8 | (China) CHN; W 8–5 | (United States) USA; W 6–5 | (International Paralympic Committee) NPA; W 5–4 | (Slovakia) SVK; W 9–5 | (Germany) GER; W 6–2 | (Finland) FIN; W 8–4 | 2 Q | —N/a | (China) CHN; L 3–4 | (South Korea) KOR; W 5–3 | 3rd place, bronze medalist(s) |

| Pos | Team | Pld | W | L | PF | PA | PD | PCT | Ends Won | Ends Lost | Blank Ends | Stolen Ends | Shot % | Qualification |
|---|---|---|---|---|---|---|---|---|---|---|---|---|---|---|
| 1 | South Korea | 11 | 9 | 2 | 65 | 51 | 14 | 0.818 | 38 | 36 | 9 | 11 | 66% | Advance to playoffs |
| 2 | Canada | 11 | 9 | 2 | 74 | 45 | 29 | 0.818 | 47 | 28 | 6 | 27 | 62% | Advance to playoffs |
| 3 | China | 11 | 9 | 2 | 85 | 42 | 43 | 0.818 | 43 | 32 | 2 | 16 | 67% | Advance to playoffs |
| 4 | Norway | 11 | 7 | 4 | 55 | 57 | −2 | 0.636 | 41 | 35 | 5 | 15 | 58% | Advance to playoffs |
| 5 | Neutral Paralympic Athletes | 11 | 5 | 6 | 61 | 63 | −2 | 0.455 | 44 | 37 | 2 | 23 | 62% | |
| 6 | Switzerland | 11 | 5 | 6 | 56 | 63 | −7 | 0.455 | 36 | 45 | 2 | 11 | 61% | |
| 7 | Great Britain | 11 | 5 | 6 | 57 | 53 | 4 | 0.455 | 41 | 41 | 6 | 20 | 62% | |
| 8 | Germany | 11 | 5 | 6 | 57 | 68 | −11 | 0.455 | 37 | 39 | 5 | 16 | 54% | |
| 9 | Slovakia | 11 | 4 | 7 | 62 | 72 | −10 | 0.364 | 39 | 46 | 1 | 11 | 57% | |
| 10 | Sweden | 11 | 4 | 7 | 47 | 66 | −19 | 0.364 | 29 | 45 | 8 | 8 | 57% | |
| 11 | Finland | 11 | 2 | 9 | 53 | 87 | −34 | 0.182 | 35 | 46 | 1 | 11 | 51% | |
| 12 | United States | 11 | 2 | 9 | 58 | 63 | −5 | 0.182 | 37 | 45 | 3 | 12 | 60% | |

Source: Paralympic.org

Round robin

Canada has a bye in draws 3, 5, 7, 10, 12 and 17.

Draw 1

Saturday, 10 March, 14:35

| Sheet B | 1 | 2 | 3 | 4 | 5 | 6 | 7 | 8 | Final |
| Switzerland (Wagner) | 0 | 0 | 0 | 0 | 0 | 0 | X | X | 0 |
| Canada (Ideson) 🔨 | 2 | 1 | 1 | 1 | 2 | 1 | X | X | 8 |

Draw 2

Saturday, 10 March, 19:35

| Sheet D | 1 | 2 | 3 | 4 | 5 | 6 | 7 | 8 | Final |
| Canada (Ideson) | 0 | 2 | 2 | 1 | 1 | 4 | X | X | 10 |
| Norway (Lorentsen) 🔨 | 1 | 0 | 0 | 0 | 0 | 0 | X | X | 1 |

Draw 4

Sunday, 11 March, 14:35

| Sheet C | 1 | 2 | 3 | 4 | 5 | 6 | 7 | 8 | Final |
| Canada (Ideson) 🔨 | 0 | 0 | 4 | 1 | 1 | 0 | 0 | 2 | 8 |
| Sweden (Petersson Dahl) | 1 | 3 | 0 | 0 | 0 | 0 | 0 | 0 | 4 |

Draw 6

Monday, 12 March, 09:35

| Sheet A | 1 | 2 | 3 | 4 | 5 | 6 | 7 | 8 | Final |
| South Korea (Seo) 🔨 | 3 | 0 | 0 | 1 | 0 | 3 | 0 | X | 7 |
| Canada (Ideson) | 0 | 0 | 1 | 0 | 2 | 0 | 2 | X | 5 |

Draw 8

Monday, 12 March, 19:35

| Sheet C | 1 | 2 | 3 | 4 | 5 | 6 | 7 | 8 | Final |
| Great Britain (Neilson) | 0 | 1 | 1 | 1 | 2 | 0 | 3 | X | 8 |
| Canada (Ideson) 🔨 | 0 | 0 | 0 | 0 | 0 | 1 | 0 | X | 1 |

Draw 9

Tuesday, 13 March, 09:35

| Sheet D | 1 | 2 | 3 | 4 | 5 | 6 | 7 | 8 | Final |
| China (Wang) 🔨 | 1 | 1 | 0 | 3 | 0 | 0 | 0 | X | 5 |
| Canada (Ideson) | 0 | 0 | 1 | 0 | 2 | 4 | 1 | X | 8 |

Draw 11

Tuesday, 13 March, 19:35

| Sheet B | 1 | 2 | 3 | 4 | 5 | 6 | 7 | 8 | EE | Final |
| Canada (Ideson) | 0 | 0 | 1 | 1 | 1 | 1 | 0 | 1 | 1 | 6 |
| United States (Black) 🔨 | 2 | 1 | 0 | 0 | 0 | 0 | 2 | 0 | 0 | 5 |

Draw 13

Wednesday, 14 March, 14:35

| Sheet D | 1 | 2 | 3 | 4 | 5 | 6 | 7 | 8 | Final |
| Canada (Ideson) | 0 | 0 | 1 | 0 | 1 | 1 | 0 | 2 | 5 |
| Neutral Paralympic Athletes (Kurokhtin) 🔨 | 1 | 0 | 0 | 1 | 0 | 0 | 2 | 0 | 4 |

Draw 14

Wednesday, 14 March, 19:35

| Sheet B | 1 | 2 | 3 | 4 | 5 | 6 | 7 | 8 | Final |
| Slovakia (Ďuriš) | 0 | 0 | 0 | 0 | 3 | 1 | 1 | 0 | 5 |
| Canada (Ideson) 🔨 | 2 | 3 | 1 | 1 | 0 | 0 | 0 | 2 | 9 |

Draw 15

Thursday, 15 March, 09:35

| Sheet A | 1 | 2 | 3 | 4 | 5 | 6 | 7 | 8 | Final |
| Canada (Ideson) 🔨 | 0 | 0 | 3 | 1 | 0 | 1 | 1 | X | 6 |
| Germany (Putzich) | 1 | 0 | 0 | 0 | 1 | 0 | 0 | X | 2 |

Draw 16

Thursday, 15 March, 14:35

| Sheet C | 1 | 2 | 3 | 4 | 5 | 6 | 7 | 8 | Final |
| Canada (Ideson) 🔨 | 0 | 0 | 1 | 1 | 1 | 0 | 3 | 2 | 8 |
| Finland (Karjalainen) | 2 | 1 | 0 | 0 | 0 | 1 | 0 | 0 | 4 |

Semifinal

Friday, 16 March, 15:35

| Sheet A | 1 | 2 | 3 | 4 | 5 | 6 | 7 | 8 | Final |
| China (Wang) 🔨 | 0 | 1 | 0 | 2 | 0 | 0 | 0 | 1 | 4 |
| Canada (Ideson) | 0 | 0 | 1 | 0 | 2 | 0 | 0 | 0 | 3 |

Bronze medal game

Saturday, 17 March, 09:35

| Sheet B | 1 | 2 | 3 | 4 | 5 | 6 | 7 | 8 | Final |
| South Korea (Seo) 🔨 | 0 | 0 | 1 | 0 | 1 | 0 | 1 | X | 3 |
| Canada (Ideson) | 2 | 0 | 0 | 2 | 0 | 1 | 0 | X | 5 |

== See also ==
- Canada at the Paralympics
- Canada at the 2018 Winter Olympics
