= Lisa Bunschoten =

Dutch para-snowboarder (born 1995)

Lisa Bunschoten-Vos
Personal information
- Nationality: Dutch
- Born: Lisa Bunschoten; 23 November 1995 (age 30) Utrecht, Netherlands
- Spouse: Chris Vos (m. 2023)

Sport
- Country: Netherlands
- Sport: Para-snowboarding
- Disability class: SB-LL2
- Events: Para-snowboard cross, banked slalom
Medal record
Women's para snowboarding
Representing the Netherlands
Paralympic Games
Silver medal – second place	2018 Pyeongchang	Snowboard cross
Silver medal – second place	2026 Milano Cortina	Banked slalom
Bronze medal – third place	2018 Pyeongchang	Banked slalom

Lisa Bunschoten-Vos (née Bunschoten; born 23 November 1995) is a Dutch para-snowboarder and three-time Paralympic medalist. Bunschoten-Vos was born with fibula aplasia.

== Career ==
Bunschoten competed at the 2014 Winter Paralympics in Sochi, Russia, and won the 2015/16 overall World Cup title in banked slalom. Former para-snowboarder Bibian Mentel coached Bunschoten early in her career.

Bunschoten represented the Netherlands at the 2018 Winter Paralympics in Pyeongchang, South Korea. She won the silver medal in the snowboard cross event, and took bronze in the banked slalom.

She won the gold medal in the women's dual banked slalom SB-LL2 event at the 2021 World Para Snow Sports Championships held in Lillehammer, Norway. She also won the gold medal in the women's snowboard cross SB-LL2 event. Bunschoten and Renske van Beek also won the silver medal in the women's team event.

Bunschoten and Chris Vos were the flagbearers for the Netherlands during the opening ceremony of the 2022 Winter Paralympics in Beijing, China. Bunschoten missed out on winning a medal in the women's snowboard cross SB-LL2 event after a collision with eventual bronze medalist Brenna Huckaby of the United States. She also competed in the women's banked slalom SB-LL2 event.

Bunschoten-Vos represented the Netherlands at the 2026 Winter Paralympics. She competed in the banked slalom, where she won the silver medal after clocking 1:03.53 in her second run.

== Personal life ==
In 2023, Bunschoten married her longtime boyfriend, fellow para-snowboarder Chris Vos. The couple have a daughter. They live together in Zuidoostbeemster.
