= Chris Vos =

Dutch para-snowboarder (born 1998)

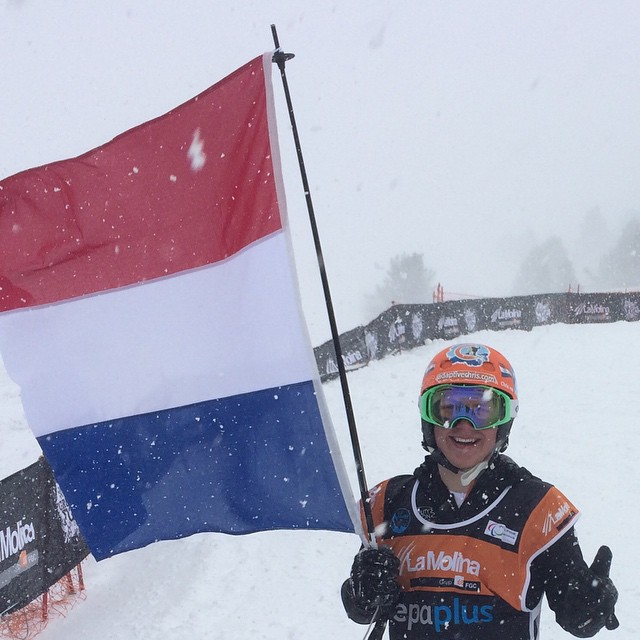
- Vos in 2015

Personal information
- Nationality: Dutch
- Born: 25 February 1998 (age 28) Haarlem, Netherlands
- Spouse: Lisa Bunschoten (m. 2023)
- Website: AdaptiveChris.com

Sport
- Country: Netherlands
- Sport: Para-snowboarding
- Disability class: SB-LL1
- Events: Para-snowboard cross, banked slalom
- Coached by: Frank Germann
Medal record
Men's para snowboarding
Representing the Netherlands
Winter Paralympic Games
Silver medal – second place	2018 PyeongChang	Snowboard cross - SB-LL1
Silver medal – second place	2022 Beijing	Banked slalom - SB-LL1
WSF Para-Snowboard World Championships
Gold medal – first place	2012 Ocieres	Junior Para-Snowboardcross

Chris Vos (born 25 February 1998 in Haarlem, Netherlands) is a Dutch para-snowboarder and two-time Paralympic medalist. At age five Vos got into an accident which resulted in his right leg being paralyzed.

== Career ==
Vos made his debut in April 2011 during the World Cup in Orcières, France.

=== 2014 Winter Paralympics ===
Vos qualified for the 2014 Winter Paralympics in Sochi, Russia. He did this by coming in fourth in the Europa Cup in Landgraaf, Netherlands. He participated in the snowboard cross event where he ranked 13th.

=== X Games appearances ===
In 2015, Vos was invited to participate in the X Games. The X Games are an annual event held in Aspen, Colorado, United States. The event is invite only. Vos reached the finals and ultimately ranked eighth. He was invited once more in 2016, finishing ninth.

=== 2018 Winter Paralympics ===
Vos represented the Netherlands at the 2018 Winter Paralympics in Pyeongchang, South Korea. He won a silver medal in the snowboard cross and placed fourth in the banked slalom.

=== 2022 Winter Paralympics ===
Vos and Lisa Bunschoten were the flagbearers for the Netherlands during the opening ceremony of the 2022 Winter Paralympics in Beijing, China. He won the silver medal in the men's banked slalom SB-LL1 event.

=== 2026 Winter Paralympics ===
Vos represented the Netherlands at the 2026 Winter Paralympics in Milan and Cortina d'Ampezzo, Italy. He placed fifth in the snowboard cross and seventh in the banked slalom.

== Personal life ==
Vos followed and completed MBO education at the Johan Cruyff College, Nijmegen, Netherlands.

In 2010, Vos participated in a Dutch TV show called Cappies Award which was broadcast by TROS and presented by Lucille Werner. The show aimed to show the things handicapped children could do, rather than the things they couldn't. In the show Vos was introduced to Bibian Mentel who gave him a medal for his effort. Mentel proclaimed that she hoped that she and Vos would participate in the 2014 Winter Paralympics together, which happened.

Vos is a member of the Mentelity Foundation, a foundation that seeks to get children with a handicap to participate in sport.

Vos earned his private pilot licence in 2020 after two years of studying.

In 2023, Vos married his longtime girlfriend, fellow para-snowboarder Lisa Bunschoten. The couple have a daughter. They live together in Zuidoostbeemster.

== Awards ==
- Was named Allianz Athlete of the Month for February 2015 by the International Paralympic Committee.
