= Rita van Driel =

Dutch Paralympic board executive

Personal details
- Born: 25 February 1961 (age 65) Rotterdam, Netherlands

Rita van Driel (born February 25, 1961) is a Dutch board executive of the International Paralympic Committee since 2009. During her time with the IPC, she was an evaluator of the 2022 Winter Paralympics and coordinator of the 2022 Winter Olympics. Before joining the IPC, van Driel was an evaluator of the 2010 Winter Olympics for the International Olympic Committee.

== Early life and education ==
Rita van Driel was born on February 25, 1961, in Rotterdam, Netherlands. In the 1980s, she completed a teacher's college program and specialized as a gym teacher. Afterwards, van Driel went to the University of Groningen to complete her post-doctorate in sports management. In 2013, she completed an additional certificate from the World Academy of Sports.

== Career ==
In 1984, van Driel started her career as an elementary school teacher in Rotterdam. She moved onward in 1989 to the Dutch Ski Federation and became an instructor for skiers with disabilities. After leaving her instructing position in 1997, she worked as a high school skiing teacher until 2001. Outside of her teaching career, van Driel has been a part of multiple sporting organizations. In 2003, van Driel started her position at the International Olympic Committee as part of the evaluating committee for the 2010 Winter Olympics. In 2008, van Driel started to work at the NOC*NSF. The following year, she was elected onto the board of governors for the International Paralympic Committee. During her time at the IPC, van Driel was selected to be an evaluating member of the 2022 Winter Paralympics in 2014, and as a coordinator of the 2022 Winter Olympics in 2016. Van Driel was reelected to the IPC in 2017.
