= Amy Purdy =

American actress and athlete

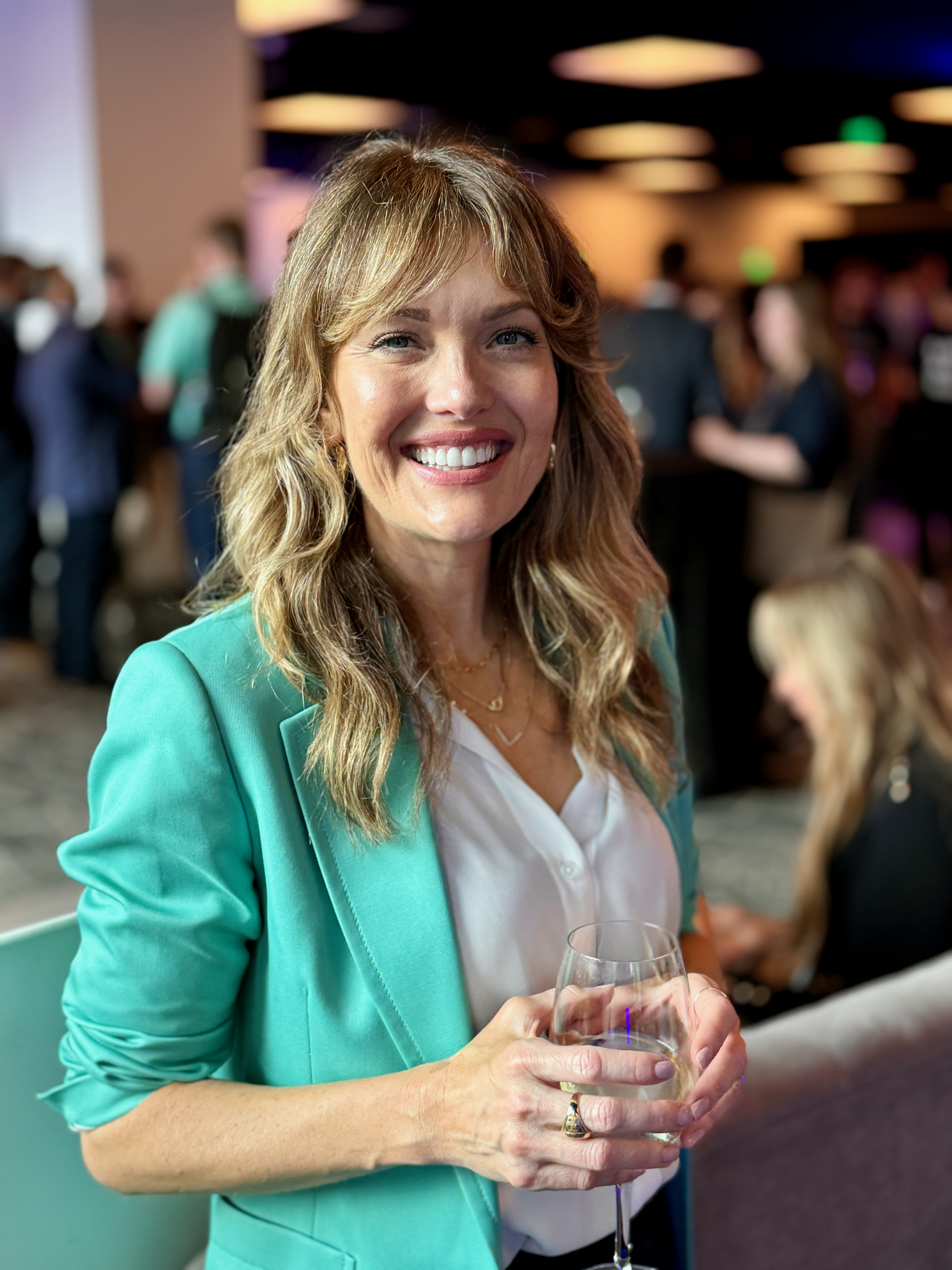
- Purdy in 2024

Personal information
- Born: Amy Michelle Purdy; November 7, 1979 (age 46) Las Vegas, Nevada, U.S.
- Spouse: Daniel Gale (m. 2015)
- Website: amypurdy.com
Medal record
Women's para snowboarding
Representing United States
Paralympic Games
| Silver medal – second place | 2018 Pyeongchang | Snowboard cross |
| Bronze medal – third place | 2014 Sochi | Snowboard cross |
| Bronze medal – third place | 2018 Pyeongchang | Banked slalom |
New Zealand Winter Games
| Gold medal – first place | 2011 Cardrona | Para-snowboard cross |

Amy Michelle Purdy (born November 7, 1979) is an American actress, model, para-snowboarder, motivational speaker, fashion designer and author. Purdy is a 2014 Paralympic bronze medalist, 2018 Paralympics silver medalist, and co-founder of Adaptive Action Sports.

== Life and career ==
Purdy was born in Las Vegas in 1979. When she was 19 years old, she contracted Neisseria meningitidis, a form of bacterial meningitis. The disease affected Purdy's circulatory system when the infection led to septic shock; both of her legs had to be amputated below the knee, she lost both kidneys along with hearing in her left ear, and her spleen had to be removed. Doctors gave Purdy a 2% chance of survival. Two years later, she received a kidney transplant from her father.

Purdy began snowboarding seven months after she received her prosthetic legs. About a year after her legs were amputated, Purdy finished third in a snowboarding competition at Mammoth Mountain. Subsequently, she received a grant from the Challenged Athletes Foundation (CAF), a non-profit organization. Through this grant, Purdy was able to compete in several snowboarding competitions in the U.S.

In 2003, Purdy was recruited by the CAF as spokesperson, and she moved to San Diego to be closer to the CAF headquarters. In San Diego, Purdy continued her pre-amputee profession as a massage therapist. She also became involved in the modeling and acting industry. In February 2003, Purdy played a model in a Madonna music video. Later in 2003, Purdy started working for Freedom Innovations, a prosthetic feet manufacturer, as its "Amputee Advocate".

Purdy has gone on to co-found her own non-profit organization, Adaptive Action Sports, a chapter of Disabled Sports USA for individuals with physical disabilities who want to get involved in action sports (snowboarding, skateboarding, surfing) or art and music.

In 2005, Purdy made her film debut in What's Bugging Seth, a movie by Eli Steele.

Purdy was named one of ESPNW's Impact 25 in 2014, and one of Oprah's SuperSoul 100 visionaries and influential leaders in 2016.

Purdy retired from competitive sports in March 2022.

== Television appearances ==
In 2012, Purdy and her now husband Daniel Gale participated on the 21st season of The Amazing Race. After nearly winning the first leg of the race, they were the second team eliminated and finished in 10th place out of 11 teams.

On February 5, 2014, Purdy was in a one-hour special on NBC television titled How to Raise an Olympian. The program, hosted by Meredith Vieira, chronicled the journeys of seven U.S. Olympians and included interviews with parents and coaches along with home video and photos from each athlete's childhood. Purdy went on to win the bronze medal in Snowboard Cross in the 2014 Winter Paralympics.

In 2015, Purdy was featured in a Super Bowl advertisement for the Toyota Camry. The advert features Purdy snowboarding, dancing, and adjusting her prosthetic legs with a voiceover of Muhammad Ali's "How Great I Am" speech.

== Book ==
On December 30, 2014, Purdy released a memoir entitled On My Own Two Feet: From Losing My Legs To Learning The Dance Of Life, published by HarperCollins.

== Dancing ==
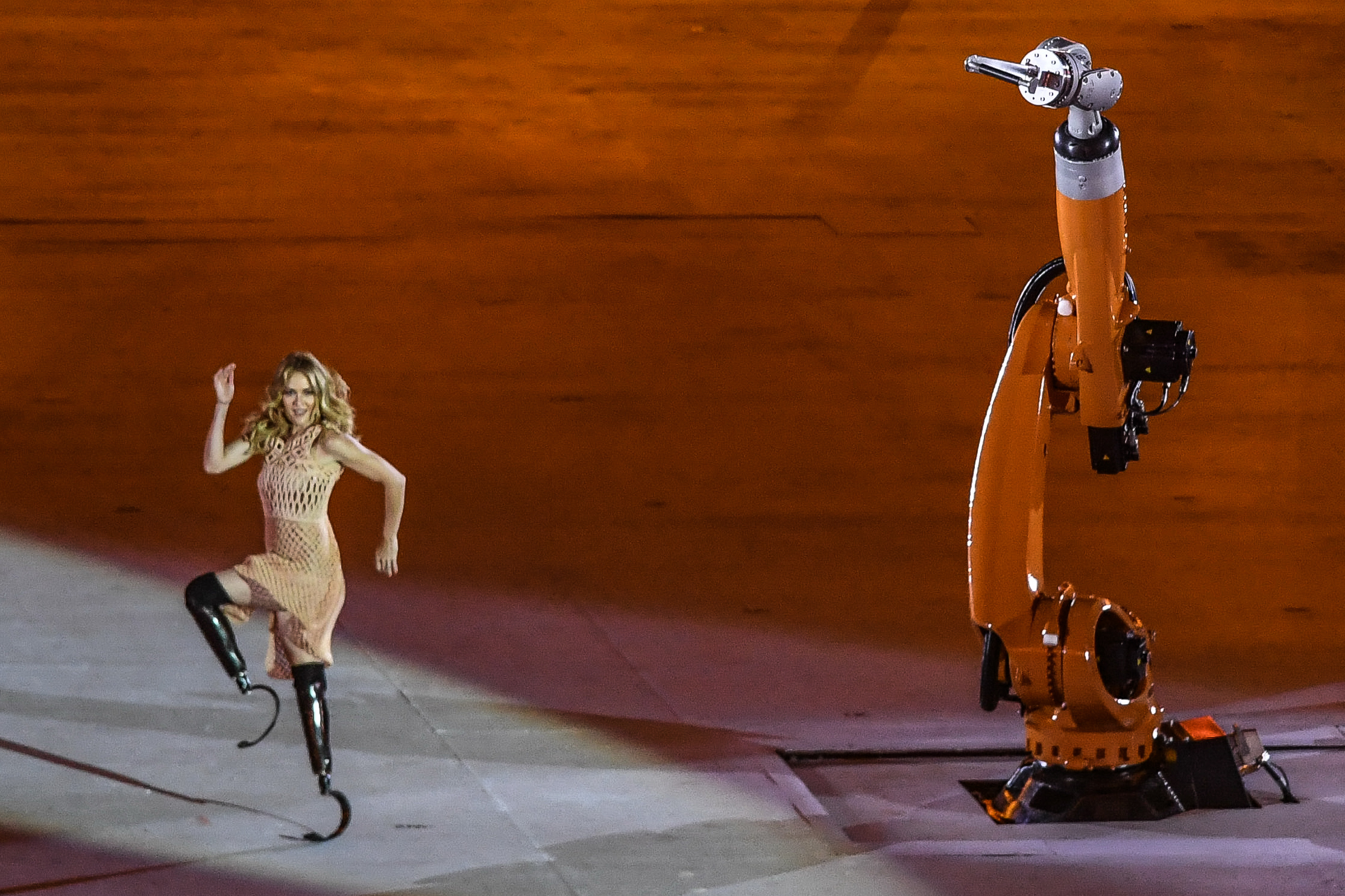
Purdy dancing with a robotic arm at the 2016 Summer Paralympics opening ceremony

Purdy was a contestant on season 18 of Dancing with the Stars. Paired with five-time champion Derek Hough, Purdy was the first double amputee contestant to ever appear on the show.

| Week # | Dance/song | Judges' score | | | Result |
| Week # | Dance/song | Inaba | Goodman | Tonioli | Result |
|---|---|---|---|---|---|
| 1 | Cha-Cha-Cha/"Counting Stars" | 8 | 8 | 8 | No Elimination |
| 2 | Swing/"Swing Set" (Jurassic 5) | 8 | 8 | 8 | Safe |
| 3 | Contemporary/"Human" | 9 | 9/9* | 9 | Safe |
| 4 | Salsa/"Brand New" | 9 | 8/8* | 9 | No Elimination |
| 5 | Waltz/"So This Is Love" | 9 | 9/10* | 9 | Safe |
| 6 | Jive/"Shout" | 9 | 10*/9 | 10 | Safe |
| 7 | Rumba/"Light My Fire"; Team Loca (Freestyle)/"Livin' la Vida Loca" | 9; 10 | 9*/9; 10*/9 | 9; 10 | Safe |
| 8 | Argentine Tango/"Heart Upon My Sleeve"; Jive Dance Duel/"Ain't Nothing Wrong with That" | 10; 9 | 10/10*; 10/10* | 10; 10 | Safe |
| 9 Semi-finals | Quickstep/"You Can't Hurry Love"; Jazz/"Too Darn Hot" | 10; 9 | 9/10*; 10/10* | 10; 10 | Safe |
| 10; Finals | Salsa/"Ran Kan Kan"; Freestyle/"Dare You"; Argentine Tango & Cha-Cha-Cha Fusion/"Rather Be" | 10; 10; 10 | 10; 9; 10 | 10; 10; 10 | Runner-Up |

At the 2016 Summer Paralympics' opening ceremony, Purdy made an appearance performing a dance routine with what was promoted as a "surprise partner": a KUKA robotic arm.

In 2018, Purdy was back on Dancing with the Stars Season 27 dancing with Tinashe & Brandon in a trio dance.

Awards and achievements
| Preceded by Corbin Bleu & Karina Smirnoff | Dancing with the Stars (US) runner up Season 18 (Spring 2014 with Derek Hough) | Succeeded by Sadie Robertson & Mark Ballas |
