= Anna Jochemsen =

Dutch Paralympic skier born in Eswatini

Personal information
- Nationality: Dutch
- Born: 30 March 1985 (age 41) Manzini, Swaziland

Sport
- Country: Netherlands
- Sport: Para-alpine skiing

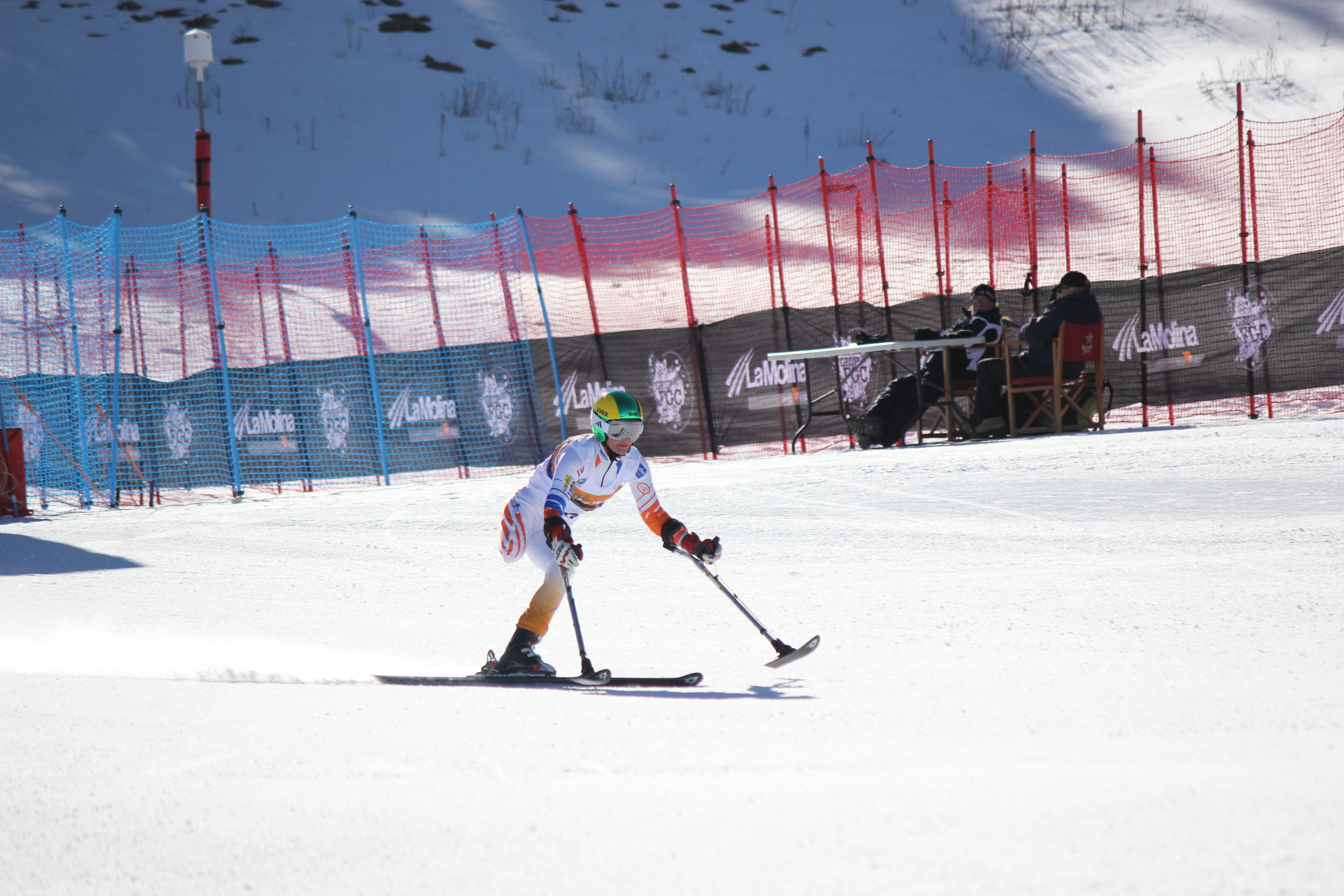
Jochemsen at the 2013 IPC Alpine World Championships in La Molina, Spain

Anna Jochemsen (born 30 March 1985) is a Dutch Paralympic skier who was born in Eswatini. She competed at the Sochi Paralympics in 2014 and carried the closing flag. She also represented the Netherlands at the 2018 Winter Paralympics.

== Life ==
Jochemsen was born in 1985 in the African city of Manzini and some of her early life was spent in Finland and the USA. One of her legs was not complete when she was born. With her father's support she took to skiing, when she was seven. She had a professional coach and when she was 23 she took part in her first competition. From 2007, she was competing internationally and training for three or four hours for six days out of every seven. She trained at the National Sports Centre Papendal, but the Netherlands is very flat so when she was mountain skiing in the for nearly half of the year she was in other countries. She also enjoys scuba diving and she became a qualified instructor.

She came sixth in the 2012/13 world championships during the 2012/2013 season which meant that she qualified for the Sochi Paralympics in 2014. Jochemsen started all five standing races in alpine skiing at Sochi with an LW2 classification. She competed in the downhill, but was unable to complete the race. Two days later, she took part in the Super-G, where she finished in 6th place. The next day, she failed to finish the first run of the Super combined. The slalom was contested the next day, over two legs, with both run times being added together to determine final standing. She was in silver medal position after finishing the first run; however she was significantly slower in the second run forcing her to settle for 7th place. The giant slalom was held on 16 March and she finished in eighth place.

At the end of the 2014 Winter Paralympics, she was given the honour of carrying the flag of the Netherlands. In 2015 she won a bronze medal at the World Championships. In the following year she graduated with a master's degree in Nutrition and Health.

There were five Dutch athletes at 2018 Winter Paralympics and she was one of them. She came 6th, again, in the Women's Super-G Standing.

By 2018, she had a bronze medal and she had won a World Cup downhill and she decided to stop competing. She faced what had been a difficult transition for other athletes. She was supported by an organisation named Athlete Career Transition.
