= Slovakia at the 2018 Winter Paralympics =

- IPC code: SVK
- NPC: Slovak Paralympic Committee
- Website: www.spv.sk

in Pyeongchang
- Competitors: 11 in 2 sports
- Flag bearers: Henrieta Farkašová & Natália Šubrtová
- Medals Ranked 7th: Gold 6 Silver 4 Bronze 1 Total 11

Winter Paralympics appearances (overview)
- 1994; 1998; 2002; 2006; 2010; 2014; 2018; 2022; 2026

Other related appearances
- Czechoslovakia (1976–1992)

Slovakia competed at the 2018 Winter Paralympics in Pyeongchang, South Korea, held between 9–18 March 2018.

== Medalists ==
Medal	Name	Sport	Event	Date
Gold	Henrieta Farkašová; Guide: Natália Šubrtová	Alpine skiing	Women's downhill	10 March
Gold	Henrieta Farkašová; Guide: Natália Šubrtová	Alpine skiing	Women's super-G	11 March
Gold	Henrieta Farkašová; Guide: Natália Šubrtová	Alpine skiing	Women's combined	13 March
Gold	Henrieta Farkašová; Guide: Natália Šubrtová	Alpine skiing	Women's giant slalom	14 March
Gold	Jakub Krako; Guide: Branislav Brozman	Alpine skiing	Men's super-G	11 March
Gold	Miroslav Haraus; Guide: Maroš Hudík	Alpine skiing	Men's combined	13 March
Silver	Jakub Krako; Guide: Branislav Brozman	Alpine skiing	Men's downhill	10 March
Silver	Jakub Krako; Guide: Branislav Brozman	Alpine skiing	Men's giant slalom	14 March
Silver	Jakub Krako; Guide: Branislav Brozman	Alpine skiing	Men's slalom	17 March
Silver	Henrieta Farkašová; Guide: Natália Šubrtová	Alpine skiing	Women's slalom	18 March
Bronze	Miroslav Haraus; Guide: Maroš Hudík	Alpine skiing	Men's super-G	11 March

== Alpine skiing ==
Men

Athlete	Event	Run 1		Run 2		Final/Total		
Athlete	Event	Time	Rank	Time	Rank	Time	Diff	Rank
Miroslav Haraus; Guide: Maroš Hudík	Downhill, visually impaired	—N/a				DNF		
Miroslav Haraus; Guide: Maroš Hudík	Super-G, visually impaired	—N/a				1:26.66	+0.55	3rd place, bronze medalist(s)
Miroslav Haraus; Guide: Maroš Hudík	Combined, visually impaired	1:25.02	1	49.20	3	2:14.22	-	1st place, gold medalist(s)
Miroslav Haraus; Guide: Maroš Hudík	Giant slalom, visually impaired	1:08.31	2	1:09.36	5	2:17.67	+7.16	4
Miroslav Haraus; Guide: Maroš Hudík	Slalom, visually impaired	47.96	1	DNF				
Jakub Krako; Guide: Branislav Brozman	Downhill, visually impaired	—N/a				1:25.35	+1.42	2nd place, silver medalist(s)
Jakub Krako; Guide: Branislav Brozman	Super-G, visually impaired	—N/a				1:26.11	-	1st place, gold medalist(s)
Jakub Krako; Guide: Branislav Brozman	Combined, visually impaired	1:25.79	2	DSQ				
Jakub Krako; Guide: Branislav Brozman	Giant slalom, visually impaired	1:08.49	3	1:07.10	2	2:15.59	+5.08	2nd place, silver medalist(s)
Jakub Krako; Guide: Branislav Brozman	Slalom, visually impaired	49.07	3	48.47	2	1:37.54	+1.42	2nd place, silver medalist(s)
Marek Kubačka; Guide: Mária Zatovičová	Super-G, visually impaired	—N/a				1:31.97	+5.86	7
Marek Kubačka; Guide: Mária Zatovičová	Combined, visually impaired	DNF						
Marek Kubačka; Guide: Mária Zatovičová	Giant slalom, visually impaired	1:10.02	5	1:08.91	4	2:18.93	+8.42	5
Marek Kubačka; Guide: Mária Zatovičová	Slalom, visually impaired	52.78	8	55.34	7	1:48.12	+12.00	7
Martin France	Downhill, standing	—N/a				1:31.82	+6.37	16
Martin France	Super-G, standing	—N/a				1:28.66	+3.83	6
Martin France	Combined, standing	1:27.62	4	50.92	11	2:18.54	+7.98	8
Martin France	Giant slalom, standing	1:07.73	4	1:07.07	4	2:14.80	+2.33	4
Martin France	Slalom, standing	53.96	13	52.27	7	1:46.23	+10.12	11

Women

Athlete	Event	Run 1			Run 2			Final/Total
Athlete	Event	Time	Rank	Time	Rank	Time	Diff	Rank
Henrieta Farkašová; Guide: Natália Šubrtová	Downhill, visually impaired	—N/a				1:29.72	-	1st place, gold medalist(s)
Henrieta Farkašová; Guide: Natália Šubrtová	Super-G, visually impaired	—N/a				1:30.17	-	1st place, gold medalist(s)
Henrieta Farkašová; Guide: Natália Šubrtová	Combined, visually impaired	1:29.84	1	57.88	3	2:27.72	-	1st place, gold medalist(s)
Henrieta Farkašová; Guide: Natália Šubrtová	Giant slalom, visually impaired	1:10.83	1	1:12.17	1	2:23.00	-	1st place, gold medalist(s)
Henrieta Farkašová; Guide: Natália Šubrtová	Slalom, visually impaired	53.58	1	58.88	3	1:52.46	+0.66	2nd place, silver medalist(s)
Petra Smaržová	Super-G, standing	—N/a				DNF		
Petra Smaržová	Combined, standing	1:41.07	10	1:00.86	4	2:41.93	+9.23	6
Petra Smaržová	Giant slalom, standing	1:16.33	5	1:14.73	7	2:31.06	+8.14	5
Petra Smaržová	Slalom, standing	59.22	5	1:03.96	7	2:03.18	+7.72	5

== Wheelchair curling ==
Summary

Team	Event	Group stage												Tiebreaker	Semifinal	Final / BM	
Team	Event	Opposition Score	Opposition Score	Opposition Score	Opposition Score	Opposition Score	Opposition Score	Opposition Score	Opposition Score	Opposition Score	Opposition Score	Opposition Score	Rank	Opposition Score	Opposition Score	Opposition Score	Rank
Dušan Pitoňák; Radoslav Ďuriš; Peter Zaťko; Monika Kunkelová; Imrich Lyócsa	Mixed	(Finland) FIN; W 7–6	(South Korea) KOR; L 5–7	(Switzerland) SUI; L 5–6	(Sweden) SWE; W 8–3	(Germany) GER; L 6–7	(International Paralympic Committee) NPA; L 5–7	(United Kingdom) GBR; W 6–5	(China) CHN; L 2–9	(Canada) CAN; L 5–9	(Norway) NOR; L 6–7	(United States) USA; W 7–6	9	did not advance			

Pos	Team	Pld	W	L	PF	PA	PD	PCT	Ends Won	Ends Lost	Blank Ends	Stolen Ends	Shot %	Qualification
1	South Korea	11	9	2	65	51	14	0.818	38	36	9	11	66%	Advance to playoffs
2	Canada	11	9	2	74	45	29	0.818	47	28	6	27	62%	Advance to playoffs
3	China	11	9	2	85	42	43	0.818	43	32	2	16	67%	Advance to playoffs
4	Norway	11	7	4	55	57	−2	0.636	41	35	5	15	58%	Advance to playoffs
5	Neutral Paralympic Athletes	11	5	6	61	63	−2	0.455	44	37	2	23	62%	
6	Switzerland	11	5	6	56	63	−7	0.455	36	45	2	11	61%	
7	Great Britain	11	5	6	57	53	4	0.455	41	41	6	20	62%	
8	Germany	11	5	6	57	68	−11	0.455	37	39	5	16	54%	
9	Slovakia	11	4	7	62	72	−10	0.364	39	46	1	11	57%	
10	Sweden	11	4	7	47	66	−19	0.364	29	45	8	8	57%	
11	Finland	11	2	9	53	87	−34	0.182	35	46	1	11	51%	
12	United States	11	2	9	58	63	−5	0.182	37	45	3	12	60%	

Source: Paralympic.org

Round-robin

Slovakia has a bye in draws 1, 3, 8, 11, 13 and 15.

Draw 2

Saturday, 10 March, 19:35

Sheet C	1	2	3	4	5	6	7	8	Final
Slovakia (Ďuriš) 🔨	1	0	0	2	0	3	1	0	7
Finland (S. Karjalainen)	0	1	1	0	1	0	0	3	6

Draw 4

Sunday, 11 March, 14:35

Sheet D	1	2	3	4	5	6	7	8	Final
Slovakia (Ďuriš)	2	0	2	0	0	1	0	0	5
South Korea (Seo) 🔨	0	3	0	1	0	0	1	2	7

Draw 5

Sunday, 11 March, 19:35

Sheet A	1	2	3	4	5	6	7	8	Final
Slovakia (Ďuriš) 🔨	0	1	1	1	1	0	1	0	5
Switzerland (Wagner)	3	0	0	0	0	1	0	2	6

Draw 6

Monday, 12 March, 09:35

Sheet B	1	2	3	4	5	6	7	8	Final
Sweden (Petersson Dahl)	0	1	0	0	2	0	0	X	3
Slovakia (Ďuriš) 🔨	3	0	2	1	0	1	1	X	8

Draw 7

Monday, 12 March, 14:35

Sheet A	1	2	3	4	5	6	7	8	Final
Germany (Putzich)	3	0	1	0	2	0	1	0	7
Slovakia (Ďuriš) 🔨	0	2	0	2	0	1	0	1	6

Draw 9

Tuesday, 13 March, 09:35

Sheet C	1	2	3	4	5	6	7	8	Final
Neutral Paralympic Athletes (Kurokhtin)	1	1	0	2	3	0	0	X	7
Slovakia (Ďuriš) 🔨	0	0	2	0	0	2	1	X	5

Draw 10

Tuesday, 13 March, 14:35

Sheet B	1	2	3	4	5	6	7	8	Final
Great Britain (Neilson) 🔨	0	1	0	1	0	1	1	1	5
Slovakia (Ďuriš)	1	0	3	0	2	0	0	0	6

Draw 12

Wednesday, 14 March, 9:35

Sheet C	1	2	3	4	5	6	7	8	Final
Slovakia (Ďuriš) 🔨	0	1	0	0	1	0	0	X	2
China (Wang)	2	0	2	1	0	1	3	X	9

Draw 14

Wednesday, 14 March, 19:35

Sheet B	1	2	3	4	5	6	7	8	Final
Slovakia (Ďuriš)	0	0	0	0	3	1	1	0	5
Canada (Ideson) 🔨	2	3	1	1	0	0	0	2	9

Draw 16

Thursday, 15 March, 14:35

Sheet A	1	2	3	4	5	6	7	8	EE	Final
Norway (Lorentsen) 🔨	1	0	1	0	1	0	1	2	1	7
Slovakia (Ďuriš)	0	2	0	3	0	1	0	0	0	6

Draw 17

Thursday, 15 March, 19:35

Sheet D	1	2	3	4	5	6	7	8	Final
United States (Black) 🔨	1	0	2	0	1	0	2	0	6
Slovakia (Ďuriš)	0	1	0	3	0	1	0	2	7

== See also ==
- Slovakia at the Paralympics
- Slovakia at the 2018 Winter Olympics
