= Cécile Hernandez =

French Paralympic snowboarder (born 1974)

Personal information
- Nationality: French
- Born: 20 June 1974 (age 52) Perpignan, France
Medal record
Women's para snowboarding
Representing France
Winter Paralympic Games
Gold medal – first place	2022 Beijing	Snowboard cross SB-LL2
Gold medal – first place	2026 Milano Cortina	Snowboard cross SB-LL2
Silver medal – second place	2014 Sochi	Snowboard cross
Silver medal – second place	2018 Pyeongchang	Banked slalom SB-LL1
Bronze medal – third place	2018 Pyeongchang	Snowboard cross SB-LL1
World Championships
Gold medal – first place	2015 La Molina	Banked slalom SB-LL1
Silver medal – second place	2015 La Molina	Snowboard cross SB-LL1
Silver medal – second place	2017 Big White	Banked slalom SB-LL1
Silver medal – second place	2017 Big White	Snowboard cross SB-LL1

Cécile Hernandez is a French para-snowboarder and four-time Paralympic medallist, with gold medals from Beijing 2022 and Milano Cortina 2026, a silver medal from Sochi 2014, and both a silver and a bronze from PyeongChang 2018. She competes for the teams Les Angles and France Douanes, as well as the French national Paralympic team; outside sport, she is a customs officer journalist and writer.

== Life and career ==
Hernandez began her sporting career as a BMX racer in international competition before discovering snowboarding. On 21 October 2002 she experienced an attack of multiple sclerosis that paralysed her legs for two months. As a result, she stopped sport and took refuge in writing, publishing two books for Éditions du Rocher and working for Europe 1 (from 2011) and Le Figaro from 2012, covering the 2012 Summer Paralympics in London.

In May 2012, Hernandez arranged an endurance race for both disabled and able-bodied athletes, travelling from Lyon to Bordeaux by bicycle and kayak. Then, in 2013, when she happened to try snowboarding again in the French Alps, she was spotted by a member of the French para-snowboarding team. She was selected for the Paralympic snowboarding team for the Sochi Games in February 2014, with just over a month to prepare, but was encouraged by her performance at the World Para Snowboard World Cup the previous month. She won a silver Paralympic medal at Sochi, with a snowboard cross time of 2:07.31, and was named a knight of the National Order of Merit by then-president François Hollande in June 2014.

In the 2014–15 season, Hernandez won the grand slam with all stages of the World Para Snowboard World Cup in both snowboard cross and banked slalom; leading her first full season gained her a Crystal Globe and she ended the season at La Molina crowned world champion in banked slalom and with a silver medal in snowboard cross. In 2015–16, still competing for the Les Angles team, she won 10 races in the European and World Cups and 2 further Crystal Globes — a gros globe for leading the World Para Snowboard rankings and a petit globe for first place in the banked slalom — as well as the silver medal for snowboard cross.

On 4 February 2017 at Big White, she won another silver medal in snowboard cross, winning the banked slalom silver 3 days later. At the end of the 2016–17 season the following month, with 7 spots on the podium, including 5 victories, she won a third gros globe and both petits globes for snowboard cross and banked slalom.

She joined the France Douanes team on 20 January 2017 with the aim of travelling to PyeongChang as a part of the French Paralympic team for the 2018 Winter games, where she won bronze in the snowboard cross and silver in the banked slalom.

She won the silver medal in the women's dual banked slalom SB-LL1 event at the 2021 World Para Snow Sports Championships held in Lillehammer, Norway. She also won the gold medal in the women's snowboard cross SB-LL1 event.

Hernandez is classified as a SB-LL1 snowboarder. Hernandez learned days before her competition at the 2022 Winter Paralympics that she was allowed to compete. This was previously not permitted as there are no SB-LL1 events for female snowboarders in the snowboarding programme. She won the gold medal in the women's snowboard cross SB-LL2 event. She also competed in the women's banked slalom SB-LL2 event.

== Personal life ==
Hernandez is married, to Frédéric, with a daughter, Victoire-Eléonore.

== Works ==
- La guerre des nerfs : 33 ans, sclérose en plaques [War of Nerves], Monaco: Rocher, 2008. ISBN 9782268064444, OCLC 213376314
- Qu'est-ce qu'elle fait maman ? [What's she doing mummy?], Monaco: Rocher, 2009. ISBN 9782268068312, OCLC 465087793
