= Emily Young (skier) =

Personal information
- Born: January 15, 1991 (age 35) North Vancouver, Canada

Sport
- Country: Canada
- Sport: Triathlon, Wrestling, Paralympic Nordic skiing
- Disability class: LW6/8
- Coached by: Robin McKeever
Medal record
Women's paralympic cross-country skiing
Representing Canada
Winter Paralympics
Silver medal – second place	2018 Pyeongchang	4 × 2.5km mixed relay
Bronze medal – third place	2018 Pyeongchang	7.5km classical standing
Bronze medal – third place	2022 Beijing	4 × 2.5km mixed relay

Emily Young (born 15 January 1991), also known as Emily Weekes, is a Canadian female Paralympic cross-country skier and biathlete. She has competed formerly as a wrestler and triathlete for Canada in international and national competitions.

== Early career ==
Emily Weekes competed in 2009 Canada Summer Games and claimed a bronze medal in the wrestling event. She sustained a nerve damage from an injury in her right arm due to a wrestling training accident at the age of eighteen just after the conclusion of the 2009 Canada Summer Games. As a result of the accident, she had to withdraw from competing in wrestling and triathlon events. In fact, her Olympic dream as a wrestler spoilt due to the nerve damage.

== Paralympic career ==
She made her Paralympic debut for Canada at the 2018 Winter Paralympics and claimed her first Paralympic medal after clinching a bronze medal in the women's 7.5km classical standing cross-country skiing event.

She was also the member of the Canadian mixed relay team which secured a silver medal in the 4 x 2.5 km mixed relay event as a part of the 2018 Winter Paralympics.
