= Renske van Beek =

Dutch Paralympic snowboarder

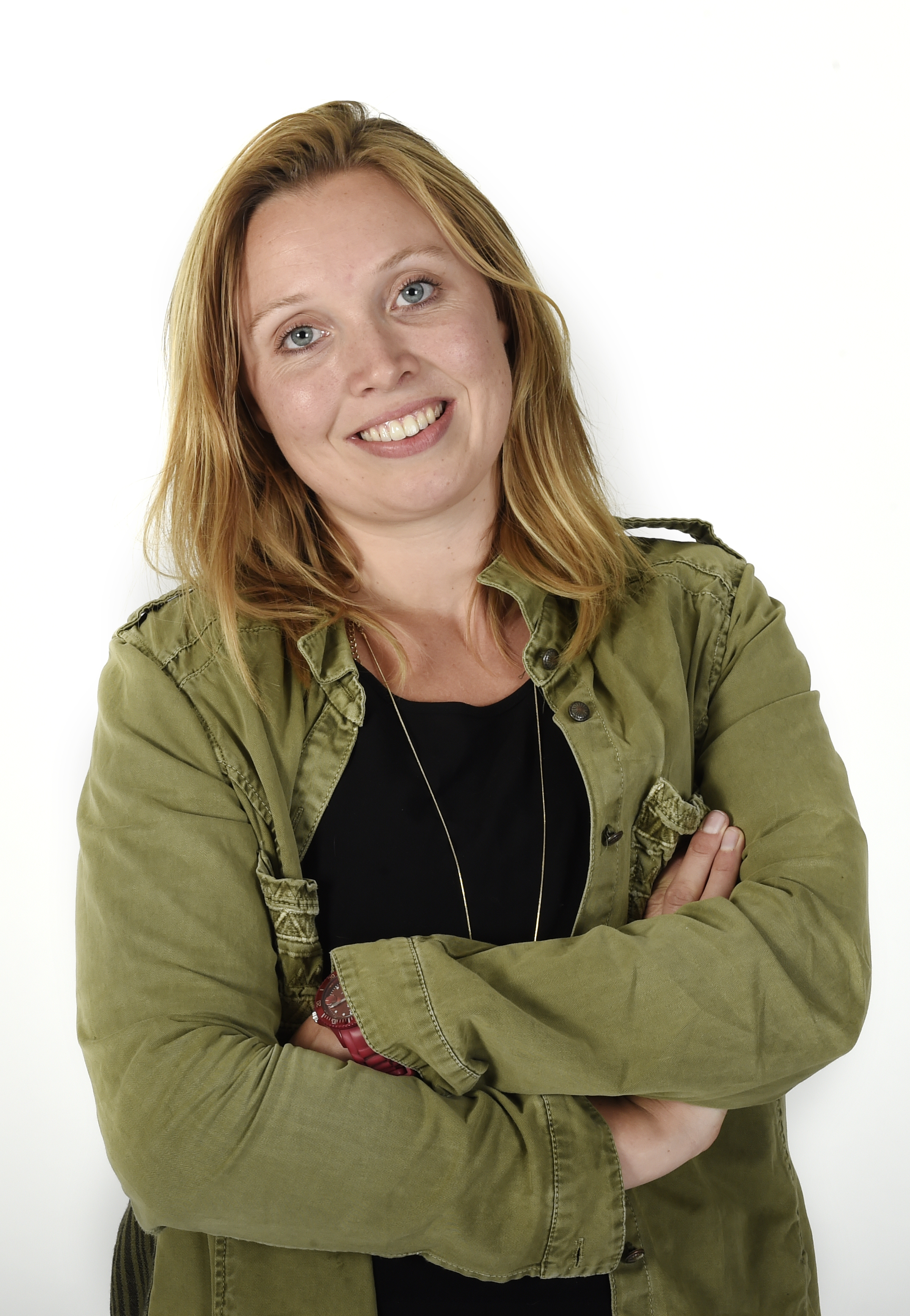

Personal information
- Nationality: Dutch
- Born: 25 April 1989 (age 37) The Hague, Netherlands
Medal record
Women's para snowboarding
Representing Netherlands
World Para Snow Sports Championships
Silver medal – second place	2021 Lillehammer	Team event
Bronze medal – third place	2021 Lillehammer	Snowboard cross

Renske van Beek (born 25 April 1989) is a Dutch para-snowboarder in the SB-LL2 category.

== Life and career ==
Van Beek sustained a cerebral infarction when she was ten, which left her paralyzed on one side. She started snowboarding because skiing was no longer possible. Through Bibian Mentel's Mentelity Foundation, she ended up in the U23 team of the Dutch Ski Association.

At the 2021 World Para Snow Sports Championships, van Beek won the bronze medal in the women's snowboard cross event. Along with Lisa Bunschoten, she also won the silver medal in the women's team event.

She represented the Netherlands at the 2022 Winter Paralympics in Beijing, China. She competed in the women's snowboard cross SB-LL2 and women's banked slalom SB-LL2 events.
