= Brenna Huckaby =

American para-snowboarder (born 1996)

Personal information
- Born: January 22, 1996 (age 30) Baton Rouge, Louisiana, U.S.
- Height: 5 ft 9 in (175 cm)
- Weight: 140 lb (64 kg)

Sport
- Country: United States
- Sport: Snowboarding
- Events: Snowboard cross Banked slalom
- Coached by: Lane Clegg
Medal record
Women's para snowboarding
Representing United States
Winter Paralympics
Gold medal – first place	2018 Pyeongchang	Snowboard cross
Gold medal – first place	2018 Pyeongchang	Banked slalom
Gold medal – first place	2022 Beijing	Banked slalom
Bronze medal – third place	2022 Beijing	Snowboard cross
Bronze medal – third place	2026 Milano Cortina	Banked slalom
World Championships
Gold medal – first place	2015 La Molina	Snowboard cross
Gold medal – first place	2017 Big White	Banked slalom
Gold medal – first place	2017 Big White	Snowboard cross
Silver medal – second place	2015 La Molina	Banked slalom

Brenna Huckaby (born January 22, 1996) is an American snowboarder. She competed at the 2018 Winter Paralympics, winning gold medals in the snowboard cross and banked slalom, and she won gold and a bronze medal at the 2022 Winter Paralympics. She is the first Paralympian to appear in the Swimsuit Issue of Sports Illustrated. Huckaby won the 2024 'Best Athlete with a Disability' ESPY Award.

== Early life and education ==
Huckaby has two brothers. She was a nationally ranked gymnast. In 2010, at age 14, Huckaby had most of her right leg amputated due to osteosarcoma. She learned to snowboard at age 15 at the National Ability Center. While still in school, Huckaby moved to Utah to pursue snowboarding.

== Snowboarding career ==
Huckaby won her first world championship in snowboarding in 2015. She won world championships in both snowboard-cross and banked slalom in 2017. Huckaby is the first Paralympian to appear in Sports Illustrated's Swimsuit issue.

She competed at the 2018 Winter Paralympics, winning gold medals in both the snowboard cross and banked slalom.

She won the gold medal in the women's dual banked slalom SB-LL1 event at the 2021 World Para Snow Sports Championships held in Lillehammer, Norway. She also won the silver medal in the women's snowboard cross SB-LL1 event.

Huckaby is classified as a SB-LL1 snowboarder. In January 2022, she won a court decision to allow her to compete at the 2022 Winter Paralympics; this was previously not permitted as there are no SB-LL1 events for female snowboarders in the snowboarding program. She won the gold medal in the women's banked slalom SB-LL2 event. She also won the bronze medal in the women's snowboard cross SB-LL2 event.

== Personal life ==
She is married to Tristan Clegg. Huckaby gave birth to her daughter Lilah in 2016. She gave birth to her second daughter Sloan in 2020.
