= Linda van Impelen =

Dutch para-alpine skier (born 1985)

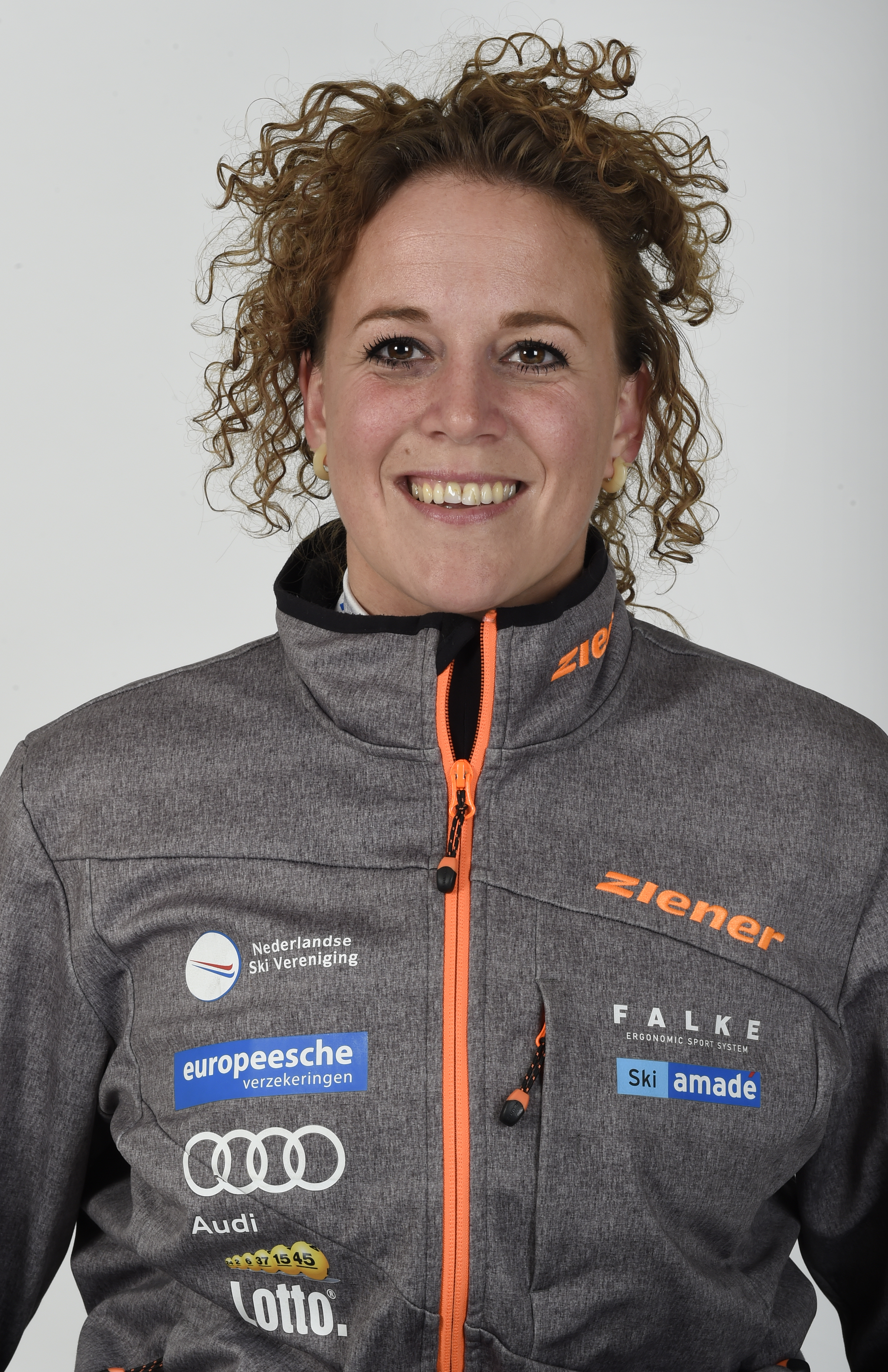
- 2015

Personal information
- Full name: Linda Johanna Wilhelmina van Impelen
- Born: 8 August 1985 (age 40) Helmond, Netherlands
Medal record
Women's para alpine skiing
Representing Netherlands
Paralympic Games
| Silver medal – second place | 2018 PyeongChang | Giant Slalom sitting |

Linda Johanna Wilhelmina van Impelen (born 8 August 1985) is a Dutch paralympic alpine skier. She represents the Netherlands in various alpine disciplines. She won a silver medal at the 2018 Winter Paralympics.

== Life ==
Linda was injured in 2009 in a car accident.
