= Michelle Salt =

Canadian Paralympic snowboarder (born 1985)

Personal information
- Full name: Michelle Sonia Salt
- Citizenship: Canada
- Born: March 5, 1985 (age 41) Edmonton, Alberta
- Height: 165 cm (5 ft 5 in) (2014)
- Website: www.michellesalt.com

Sport
- Sport: Para-snowboarding
- Disability: Above knee Leg Amputee
- Disability class: LL-1
- Club: Canada Snowboard
- Team: National Team
- Coached by: Mark Fawcett

Achievements and titles
- Paralympic finals: 2014 Winter Paralympics 2018 Winter Paralympics
- National finals: 1st in 2014/2015/2016
- Highest world ranking: 3rd overall in 2015/16/18
Medal record
2nd IPC Canada World Cup, 2nd IPC Italy SBX and BS World Cup, 2nd IPC France World Cup, 3rd - IPC World Cup in Jan 2015 at Big White, BC
- Updated on 16 March 2014

Michelle Salt (born March 5, 1985) is a Canadian Paralympic Snowboarder. She was in a life-threatening motorcycle accident June 27, 2011 that left her on life support for seven days, broke numerous bones, having to endure many surgeries and in the end, lost her right leg above the knee. She is a recently retired (2019) National team athlete for the Canada Snowboard para-team with 14 World Cup podiums. She was selected in February 2014 to compete in the 2014 Winter Paralympics in Sochi, Russia In 2018, she competed in the PyeongChang South Korea games finishing fourth and fifth.

Michelle has also been very involved in the Fitness Industry and in November 2014, Michelle returned to the Fitness Stage, competing in the NPAA.

She is the Female National Wakesurf Champion, a licensed Skydiver, Skidoo Ambassador and an Accessibility Advocate.

Michelle will be travelling North America with her dog Lenny starting July 1, 2023 to highlight places and businesses that are full accessible. See her Website and Youtube page for more info.
