= Astrid Fina =

Spanish Paralympic snowboarder

Personal information
- Full name: Astrid Fina Paredes
- Nationality: Spanish
- Born: 16 October 1983 (age 43) Barcelona, Spain

Sport
- Country: Spain
- Sport: Paralympic snowboard
Medal record
Women's para snowboarding
Representing Spain
Paralympic Games
Bronze medal – third place	2018 Pyeongchang	Snowboard Cross

Astrid Fina Paredes (Note: In this Spanish name, the first or paternal surname is Fina and the second or maternal family name is Paredes.) (born 16 October 1983 in Barcelona) is a Spanish Paralympic snowboarder. Beyond her Paralympic accomplishments, she also received a silver medal of the World Cup of snowboarding.

== Early life ==
Astrid Fina had her right foot amputated as a result of a motorcycle accident in May 2009. In 2011, she started practicing snowboarding. A year later, in 2012, she was already part of the Spanish national team.

== Snowboarding career ==
In 2015, she achieved the fourth place in the World Cup, won gold in the Spanish championships, the second place in the national openings of Italy and was the winner in the French.

In the 2017 World Cup she has achieved a plant medal in the four events of the category with amputation SB-LL2 (LW2) in which she participated, two in snowboard cross and two in banked slalom.

She participated in the 2014 Winter Paralympics in Sochi, where she scored sixth position in snowboard cross, and was one of the three Spanish representatives participating in the 2018 Winter Paralympics in Pyeongchang, where she was the flag bearer in the opening ceremony.
