= Bibian Mentel =

Dutch Paralympic snowboarder (1972–2021)

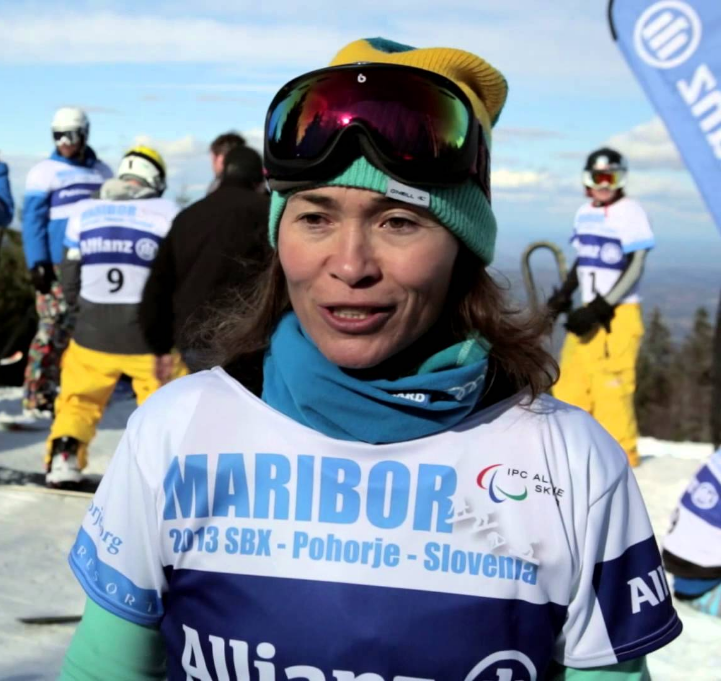
- Mentel in 2013

Personal information
- Full name: Bibian Mentel-Spee
- Nationality: Dutch
- Born: 27 September 1972 Utrecht, Netherlands
- Died: 29 March 2021 (aged 48) Loosdrecht, Netherlands
- Years active: 1996–2018
- Website: bibianmentel.com

Sport
- Country: Netherlands
- Sport: alpine skiing
- Disability class: SB-LL
- Event(s): Snowboard cross, Banked slalom
- Coached by: Edwin Spee (husband)
Medal record
Women's para snowboarding
Representing Netherlands
Winter Paralympic Games
| Gold medal – first place | 2014 Sochi | Snowboard cross |
| Gold medal – first place | 2018 PyeongChang | Snowboard cross |
| Gold medal – first place | 2018 PyeongChang | Banked slalom |
World Championships (Note: Formerly "IPC Snowboard Championships")
| Gold medal – first place | 2012 Orcières | Boardercross |
| Gold medal – first place | 2015 La Molina | Banked slalom |
| Gold medal – first place | 2015 La Molina | Snowboard cross |
| Gold medal – first place | 2017 Big White | Banked slalom |
| Gold medal – first place | 2017 Big White | Snowboard cross |

Bibian Mentel-Spee (27 September 1972 – 29 March 2021) was a Dutch three-fold Winter Paralympics gold-medalist, and five-times world champion para-snowboarding athlete. Mentel won the Paralympic gold medal in the snowboard cross discipline in the 2014 and 2018 Paralympic Winter Games, as well as in the banked slalom in 2018, despite battling cancer nine times since the beginning of the century. She won her 2018 medals at age 45.

Mentel co-wrote two books about her life, career, and struggles with cancer, and set up her own "Mentelity" foundation.

In 2012, Mentel was invested as a knight of the Order of Orange-Nassau.

== Career ==
Mentel started her snowboard career in 1993. In 1996 she participated in her first FIS Snowboard World Cup competition. Mentel became six times Dutch champion in the regular, non-disabled half-pipe and snowboard cross disciplines, before developing medical troubles.

During a practice run for the championships in Breckenridge, Colorado, in December 1999, she suffered an injury in her ankle. She completed the season, however the ankle remained a source of concern. X-rays showed a spot on her tibia which was diagnosed as a malignant bone tumor. The tumor was removed and Mentel started training for the 2002 Winter Olympics for which she qualified. Soon it became clear the tumor had regrown and had a chance of spreading to the rest of her body via her blood. She chose to have her leg amputated.

Four months after the amputation she was able to ride a snowboard again, despite still being unable to walk using crutches. The following January she was asked to present the trophy at the Dutch championships half-pipe. She decided to compete in the Dutch snowboard cross championships, which she won—in the main class—not the disabled; her seventh Dutch championship. This inspired Mentel to work with Dutch member of the International Paralympic Committee Rita van Driel to get snowboarding adopted as a medal event at the paralympic Winter Games. After eight years of lobbying this was achieved in 2012.

In 2013, Mentel qualified for the 2014 Winter Paralympics. At the opening ceremony she was the flag bearer for the Netherlands. She won the Paralympic gold medal in the snowboard cross event.

In the winter season prior to the 2018 Winter Paralympics in PyeongChang, Mentel was unable to participate in a single competition due to medical complications. Due to her condition, most sponsors had given up on her, the Dutch Olympic Committee*Dutch Sports Federation did not support her, and the Dutch Skiing sports federation would only fund a small portion of her expenses. She was able to obtain the required funds to compete at the 2018 Winter Paralympics through crowdfunding.

At the 2018 Winter Paralympics in PyeongChang, Mentel was once again the Dutch flag bearer, again winning the gold medal in the snowboard cross, as well as taking the gold medal on the banked slalom event, beating American competitor Brittani Coury by 0.07 seconds.

== Fight against cancer ==
Since being diagnosed with cancer at age 27, Mentel was confronted with and treated for cancer nine times, including five surgeries. The most recent surgery, in January 2018, replaced her C6 neck vertebra with a titanium frame. In 2016 she was told the cancer was terminal, but a switch to a different hospital, where she could receive advanced MRI-guided radiotherapy treatment, pulled her through, such that she was able to compete successfully in 2018.

Mentel co-wrote two books about her life, career and struggles with cancer. Magnate and philanthropist Richard Branson called her second book Kut kanker!, whose title loosely translates as "Cancer Is Crap!", a "[s]tory of an amazing woman. A must read for anyone who wants to enjoy life to the max". In total, she had received 15 treatments for cancer.

== Terminal tumor and death ==
In early March 2021, it was announced that she had been diagnosed with a terminal brain tumor. According to a statement by her management, she was looking no further ahead than a few months and had started saying farewell to friends and family. On 29 March 2021, it was announced that Mentel had died from the consequences of the tumor. She was survived by her husband and her son.

== Education ==
In 1993, Mentel gave up her law school study in Amsterdam to focus on snowboarding entirely. In 2004 she graduated from the four-year high-level professional program in 'commercial economics, sports marketing & management' at the Randstad Topsports Academy – a collaboration of the Hogeschool Rotterdam and the Saxion University of Applied Sciences, and in 2013 she became an 'International Master of Sport Management' at the Johan Cruyff Institute.

== Mentelity foundation and other activities ==
In 2012, Mentel set up her own "Mentelity foundation", to stimulate, motivate, and inspire children and adolescents with a physical disability (to continue) to engage in sports, both in general, as well as in extreme board sports in particular. By this approach, and aided by the foundation's volunteers, she wanted to make a positive contribution to the mental and physical development of physically disabled people. In that year, she also coached para-athlete Fleur Jong during her rehabilitation after a leg amputation. Mentel also coached para-snowboarder Lisa Bunschoten early in her career.

Mentel also worked as a motivational speaker, in the Dutch and English language; and occasionally taught at a wakeboarding school.

In 2019, she appeared in the television show Groeten uit 19xx.

== Awards and decorations ==
- In 2009, Mentel received the golden CAPaward, annually awarded to those who, through perseverance, overcome their physical handiCAPs and turn them into CAPabilities.
- In 2012, she received a knighthood in the Order of Orange-Nassau
- At the closing ceremony of the Sochi Games, Mentel and Australian Toby Kane received the Whang Youn Dai Achievement Award. and
- In December 2014, Mentel was elected 'Paralympic Athlete of the Year' at the annual Dutch NOC*NSF TV sports gala.
- At the 2015 Paralympic Sport and Media Awards, Mentel received the Courage Award, in recognition of her efforts to get snowboarding included in the Paralympic Winter Games. (Note: paralympic.org, 14 November 2015)
- In 2017, she received the Strong Woman Award from Dutch company VanHaren. (Note: strongwomenaward.nl, 25 April 2017)
