= Brittani Coury =

American para-snowboarder

Personal information
- Born: March 27, 1986 (age 40) Farmington, New Mexico, U.S.

Sport
- Country: United States
- Sport: snowboarding
- Disability class: SB-LL
- Event(s): Snowboard cross, Banked slalom
Medal record
Women's para snowboarding
Representing United States
Winter Paralympic Games
Silver medal – second place	2018 PyeongChang	Banked Slalom

Brittani Coury (born March 27, 1986, in Farmington, New Mexico) is a Winter Paralympics silver-medalist, and para-snowboarding athlete from the United States. She grew up in Durango, Colorado.

She also competed in snowboarding at the 2022 Winter Paralympics held in Beijing, China.
