= Cross-country skiing at the 2018 Winter Paralympics – Men's 1.5 km sprint classical =

Men's 1.5km Sprint Classic at the XII Paralympic Winter Games
- Paralympic cross-country skiing
- Venue: Alpensia Biathlon Centre in Pyeongchang, South Korea
- Dates: 14 March
- Competitors: 80 from 27 nations

Men's 1.5 km sprint (visually impaired) at the XII Paralympic Winter Games
- Competitors: 20 from 15 nations

Medalists
1st place, gold medalist(s)		Brian McKeever; Guide: Russell Kennedy	Canada
2nd place, silver medalist(s)		Zebastian Modin; Guide: Robin Bryntesson	Sweden
3rd place, bronze medalist(s)		Eirik Bye; Guide: Arvid Nelson	Norway

Men's 1.1 km sprint (sitting) at the XII Paralympic Winter Games
- Competitors: 36 from 16 nations

Medalists
1st place, gold medalist(s)		Andrew Soule	United States
2nd place, silver medalist(s)		Dzmitry Loban	Belarus
3rd place, bronze medalist(s)		Daniel Cnossen	United States

Men's 1.5 km sprint (standing) at the XII Paralympic Winter Games
- Competitors: 24 from 15 nations

Medalists
1st place, gold medalist(s)		Alexandr Kolyadin	Kazakhstan
2nd place, silver medalist(s)		Yoshihiro Nitta	Japan
3rd place, bronze medalist(s)		Mark Arendz	Canada
3rd place, bronze medalist(s)		Ilkka Tuomisto	Finland

The men's 1.5 kilometre sprint classic competition of the 2018 Winter Paralympics was held at Alpensia Cross-Country and Biathlon Centre in Pyeongchang. The competition took place on 14 March 2018.

== Medal table ==
Rank	Nation	Gold	Silver	Bronze	Total
1	Canada (CAN)	1	0	1	2
1	United States (USA)	1	0	1	2
3	Kazakhstan (KAZ)	1	0	0	1
4	Belarus (BLR)	0	1	0	1
4	Japan (JPN)	0	1	0	1
4	Sweden (SWE)	0	1	0	1
7	Finland (FIN)	0	0	1	1
7	Norway (NOR)	0	0	1	1
Totals (8 entries)		3	3	4	10

== Visually impaired ==
=== Qualification ===
Rank	Bib	Name	Country	Real Time	Calculated Time	Difference	Notes
1	121	Zebastian Modin; Guide: Robin Bryntesson	Sweden	3:56.32	3:27.96	–	Q
2	122	Brian McKeever; Guide: Russell Kennedy	Canada	3:33.81	3:33.81	+5.85	Q
3	123	Jake Adicoff; Guide: Sawyer Kesselheim	United States	3:42.13	3:42.13	+14.17	Q
4	130	Nico Messinger; Guide: Lutz Peter Klausmann	Germany	3:48.83	3:46.54	+18.58	Q
5	126	Eirik Bye; Guide: Arvid Nelson	Norway	3:49.66	3:49.66	+21.70	Q
6	127	Dmytro Suiarko; Guide: Vasyl Potapenko	Ukraine	3:53.01	3:50.68	+22.72	Q
7	132	Inkki Inola; Guide: Vili Sormunen	Finland	3:52.10	3:52.10	+24.14	Q
8	124	Thomas Clarion; Guide: Antoine Bollet	France	4:27.68	3:55.56	+27.60	Q
9	125	Yury Holub; Guide: Dzmitry Budzilovich	Belarus	3:58.43	3:58.43	+30.47	
10	131	Piotr Garbowski; Guide: Jakub Twardowski	Poland	3:59.34	3:59.34	+31.38	
11	134	Thomas Dubois; Guide: Bastien Sauvage	France	4:40.73	4:06.73	+38.77	
12	128	Iurii Utkin; Guide: Ruslan Perekhoda	Ukraine	4:09.46	4:06.97	+39.01	
13	133	Mikita Ladzesau; Guide: Aliaksei Lukyanau	Belarus	4:20.83	4:18.22	+50.26	
14	135	Kairat Kanafin; Guide: Anton Zhdanovich	Kazakhstan	4:21.77	4:19.15	+51.19	
15	136	Kazuto Takamura; Guide: Yuhei Fujita	Japan	5:02.08	4:25.83	+57.87	
16	137	Lukasz Kubica; Guide: Wojciech Suchwałko	Poland	4:26.23	4:26.23	+58.27	
17	139	Rudolf Klemetti; Guide: Jaakko Kallunki	Finland	4:28.36	4:28.36	+1:00.40	
18	140	Svetoslav Georgiev; Guide: Ivan Birnikov	Bulgaria	4:32.46	4:29.74	+1:01.78	
19	138	Choi Bo-gue; Guide: Kim Hyun-woo	South Korea	4:33.13	4:33.13	+1:05.17	
20	141	Siyovush Iliasov; Guide: Ilkhomiddin Abdulloev	Tajikistan	9:31.34	8:22.78	+4:54.82	
	129	Oleksandr Kazik; Guide: Sergiy Kucheryaviy	Ukraine	DNS			

=== Finals ===
==== Semifinal 1 ====
Rank	Bib	Name	Country	Start	Time	Difference	Notes
1	181	Zebastian Modin; Guide: Robin Bryntesson	Sweden	0:00	4:21.4	–	Q
2	185	Eirik Bye; Guide: Arvid Nelson	Norway	0:28	4:35.5	+14.1	Q
3	184	Nico Messinger; Guide: Lutz Peter Klausmann	Germany	0:26	4:43.0	+21.6	
4	188	Thomas Clarion; Guide: Antoine Bollet	France	0:00	4:43.8	+22.4	

==== Semifinal 2 ====
Rank	Bib	Name	Country	Start	Time	Difference	Notes
1	182	Brian McKeever; Guide: Russell Kennedy	Canada	0:02	4:10.3	–	Q
2	183	Jake Adicoff; Guide: Sawyer Kesselheim	United States	0:02	4:10.3	+0.0	Q
3	186	Dmytro Suiarko; Guide: Vasyl Potapenko	Ukraine	0:00	4:12.6	+2.3	
4	187	Inkki Inola; Guide: Vili Sormunen	Finland	0:02	4:17.6	+7.3	

==== Final ====
Rank	Bib	Name	Country	Start	Time	Difference
1st place, gold medalist(s)	182	Brian McKeever; Guide: Russell Kennedy	Canada	0:28	4:03.2	–
2nd place, silver medalist(s)	181	Zebastian Modin; Guide: Robin Bryntesson	Sweden	0:00	4:05.7	+2.5
3rd place, bronze medalist(s)	185	Eirik Bye; Guide: Arvid Nelson	Norway	0:28	4:32.7	+29.5
4	183	Jake Adicoff; Guide: Sawyer Kesselheim	United States	0:28	RAL	

== Standing ==
=== Qualification ===
Rank	Bib	Name	Country	Real Time	Calculated Time	Difference	Notes
1	83	Alexandr Kolyadin	Kazakhstan	3:45.68	3:36.65	–	Q
2	72	Yoshiro Nitta	Japan	4:00.37	3:38.74	+2.09	Q
3	74	Mark Arendz	Canada	4:03.34	3:39.01	+2.36	Q
4	81	Alexander Ehler	Germany	3:49.24	3:40.07	+3.42	Q
5	80	Taiki Kawayoke	Japan	4:35.58	3:40.46	+3.81	Q
6	75	Witold Skupień	Poland	4:35.59	3:40.47	+3.82	Q
7	71	Ilkka Tuomisto	Finland	4:03.91	3:41.96	+5.31	Q
8	73	Grygorii Vovchynskyi	Ukraine	4:04.18	3:42.20	+5.55	Q
9	76	Håkon Olsrud	Norway	4:10.44	3:47.90	+11.25	Q
10	79	Alexandr Gerlits	Kazakhstan	4:15.40	3:49.86	+13.21	Q
11	87	Luca Tavasci	Switzerland	4:18.62	3:55.34	+18.69	Q
12	77	Du Haitao	China	4:56.03	3:56.82	+20.17	Q
13	78	Serhii Romaniuk	Ukraine	4:20.89	3:57.41	+20.76	
14	82	Batmönkhiin Ganbold	Mongolia	4:24.50	3:58.05	+21.40	
15	85	Ma Mingtao	China	5:00.73	4:00.58	+23.93	
16	91	Johannes Birkelund	Norway	4:32.77	4:02.77	+26.12	
17	84	Wu Junbao	China	5:13.19	4:10.55	+33.90	
18	88	Keigo Iwamoto	Japan	4:50.07	4:12.36	+35.71	
19	86	Masaru Hoshizawa	Japan	4:45.76	4:20.04	+43.39	
20	89	Ruslan Reiter	United States	4:51.40	4:25.17	+48.52	
21	93	Aboulfazl Khatibi Mianaei	Iran	4:54.13	4:27.66	+51.01	
22	90	Wang Chenyang	China	5:41.58	4:33.26	+56.61	
23	92	Christian Toninelli	Italy	5:17.80	4:49.20	+1:12.55	
24	94	Antun Bošnjaković	Croatia	5:37.57	4:53.69	+1:17.04	

=== Finals ===
==== Semifinal 1 ====
Rank	Bib	Name	Country	Start	Time	Difference	Notes
1	141	Alexandr Kolyadin	Kazakhstan	0:45	4:52.2	–	Q
2	148	Grygorii Vovchynskyi	Ukraine	0:33	4:58.6	+6.4	Q
3	144	Alexander Ehler	Germany	0:45	4:58.7	+6.5	Q
4	149	Håkon Olsrud	Norway	0:33	5:05.4	+13.2	
5	145	Taiki Kawayoke	Japan	0:00	5:09.4	+17.2	
6	152	Du Haitao	China	0:00	5:29.8	+37.6	

==== Semifinal 2 ====
Rank	Bib	Name	Country	Start	Time	Difference	Notes
1	142	Yoshiro Nitta	Japan	0:33	4:50.5	–	Q
2	143	Mark Arendz	Canada	0:30	4:53.7	+3.2	Q
3	147	Ilkka Tuomisto	Finland	0:33	4:53.8	+3.3	Q
4	146	Witold Skupień	Poland	0:00	4:56.4	+5.9	
5	150	Alexandr Gerlits	Kazakhstan	0:30	5:09.5	+19.0	
6	151	Luca Tavasci	Switzerland	0:33	5:09.6	+19.1	

==== Final ====
Rank	Bib	Name	Country	Start	Time	Difference
1st place, gold medalist(s)	141	Alexandr Kolyadin	Kazakhstan	0:15	4:19.7	–
2nd place, silver medalist(s)	142	Yoshiro Nitta	Japan	0:03	4:20.5	+0.8
3rd place, bronze medalist(s)	143	Mark Arendz	Canada	0:00	4:20.8	+1.1
3rd place, bronze medalist(s)	147	Ilkka Tuomisto	Finland	0:03	4:20.8	+1.1
5	144	Alexander Ehler	Germany	0:15	4:21.7	+2.0
6	148	Grygorii Vovchynskyi	Ukraine	0:03	4:34.5	+14.8

== Sitting ==
=== Qualification ===
Rank	Bib	Name	Country	Real Time	Calculated Time	Difference	Notes
1	1	Maksym Yarovyi	Ukraine	3:29.95	3:00.56	–	Q
2	8	Collin Cameron	Canada	3:09.17	3:01.60	+1.04	Q
3	9	Aaron Pike	United States	3:14.83	3:07.04	+6.48	Q
4	10	Yauheni Lukyanenka	Belarus	3:08.28	3:08.28	+7.72	Q
5	4	Daniel Cnossen	United States	3:09.02	3:09.02	+8.46	Q
6	5	Dzmitry Loban	Belarus	3:09.25	3:09.25	+8.69	Q
7	14	Zheng Peng	China	3:42.34	3:11.21	+10.65	Q
8	2	Sin Eui-hyun	South Korea	3:11.33	3:11.33	+10.77	Q
9	6	Chris Klebl	Canada	3:26.25	3:13.88	+13.32	Q
10	15	Derek Zaplotinsky	Canada	3:36.34	3:14.71	+14.15	Q
11	11	Taras Rad	Ukraine	3:14.96	3:14.96	+14.40	Q
12	3	Andrew Soule	United States	3:15.27	3:15.27	+14.71	Q
13	13	Denis Petrenko	Kazakhstan	3:27.81	3:15.34	+14.78	
14	19	Sean Halsted	United States	3:25.39	3:17.17	+16.61	
15	16	Cristian Ribera	Brazil	3:29.96	3:17.36	+16.80	
16	20	Scott Meenagh	Great Britain	3:17.72	3:17.72	+17.16	
17	18	Sebastien Fortier	Canada	3:29.03	3:20.67	+20.11	
18	26	Huang Feixing	China	3:21.75	3:21.75	+21.19	
19	21	Arkadz Shykuts	Belarus	3:24.26	3:24.26	+23.70	
20	22	Huang Bita	China	3:28.70	3:28.70	+28.14	
21	27	Wang Quan	China	4:04.05	3:29.88	+29.32	
22	12	Kamil Rosiek	Poland	3:30.01	3:30.01	+29.45	
23	25	Jeremy Wagner	United States	3:39.46	3:30.68	+30.12	
24	17	Du Mingyuan	China	3:30.89	3:30.89	+30.33	
25	24	Sergey Ussoltsev	Kazakhstan	3:31.63	3:31.63	+31.07	
26	23	Lu Jingfeng	China	4:06.55	3:41.90	+41.34	
27	28	Ethan Hess	Canada	3:44.53	3:44.53	+43.97	
28	30	Vadzim Lipinski	Belarus	3:47.57	3:47.57	+47.01	
29	29	Yves Bourque	Canada	4:02.40	3:47.86	+47.30	
30	31	Temuri Dadiani	Georgia	3:56.50	3:56.50	+55.94	
31	32	Ma Yu-chol	North Korea	3:59.48	3:59.48	+58.92	
32	33	Kim Jong-hyon	North Korea	4:23.87	4:23.87	+1:23.31	
33	36	Stas Nazaryan	Armenia	4:41.11	4:41.11	+1:40.55	
34	34	Miloš Zarić	Serbia	6:02.51	5:26.26	+2:25.70	
35	35	Josip Zima	Croatia	10:01.36	9:25.28	+6:24.72	
	7	Trygve Steinar Larsen	Norway		DNF		

=== Finals ===
==== Semifinal 1 ====
Rank	Bib	Name	Country	Start	Time	Difference	Notes
1	112	Andrew Soule	United States	0:29	3:45.0	–	Q
2	108	Sin Eui-hyun	South Korea	0:29	3:45.8	+0.8	Q
3	105	Daniel Cnossen	United States	0:29	3:47.1	+2.1	Q
4	104	Yauheni Lukyanenka	Belarus	0:29	3:48.3	+3.3	
5	101	Maksym Yarovyi	Ukraine	0:00	3:52.4	+7.4	
6	109	Chris Klebl	Canada	0:18	3:53.3	+8.3	

==== Semifinal 2 ====
Rank	Bib	Name	Country	Start	Time	Difference	Notes
1	106	Dzmitry Loban	Belarus	0:29	3:46.4	–	Q
2	102	Collin Cameron	Canada	0:22	3:46.4	+0.0	Q
3	111	Taras Rad	Ukraine	0:29	3:48.6	+2.2	Q
4	103	Aaron Pike	United States	0:22	3:49.7	+3.3	
5	107	Zheng Peng	China	0:00	3:52.1	+5.7	
6	110	Derek Zaplotinsky	Canada	0:09	3:57.7	+11.3	

==== Final ====
Rank	Bib	Name	Country	Start	Time	Difference
1st place, gold medalist(s)	112	Andrew Soule	United States	0:07	3:31.4	–
2nd place, silver medalist(s)	106	Dzmitry Loban	Belarus	0:07	3:31.4	+0.0
3rd place, bronze medalist(s)	105	Daniel Cnossen	United States	0:07	3:31.8	+0.4
4	102	Collin Cameron	Canada	0:00	3:32.1	+0.7
5	111	Taras Rad	Ukraine	0:07	3:36.3	+4.9
6	108	Sin Eui-hyun	South Korea	0:07	3:38.7	+7.3

== See also ==
- Cross-country skiing at the 2018 Winter Olympics
