= Biathlon at the 2018 Winter Paralympics – Men's 7.5 kilometres =

Men's 7.5 kilometres at the XII Paralympic Winter Games
- Paralympic biathlon
- Venue: Alpensia Biathlon Centre, South Korea
- Dates: 10 March
- Competitors: 54 from 15 nations

Men's 7.5 kilometres (visually impaired) at the XII Paralympic Winter Games
- Competitors: 17 from 9 nations

Medalists
1st place, gold medalist(s)		Vitaliy Lukyanenko; Guide: Ivan Marchyshak	Ukraine
2nd place, silver medalist(s)		Yury Holub; Guide: Dzmitry Budzilovich	Belarus
3rd place, bronze medalist(s)		Anatolii Kovalevskyi; Guide: Oleksandr Mukshyn	Ukraine

Men's 7.5 kilometres (standing) at the XII Paralympic Winter Games
- Competitors: 17 from 12 nations

Medalists
1st place, gold medalist(s)		Benjamin Daviet	France
2nd place, silver medalist(s)		Mark Arendz	Canada
3rd place, bronze medalist(s)		Ihor Reptyukh	Ukraine

Men's 7.5 kilometres (sitting) at the XII Paralympic Winter Games
- Competitors: 20 from 11 nations

Medalists
1st place, gold medalist(s)		Daniel Cnossen	United States
2nd place, silver medalist(s)		Dzmitry Loban	Belarus
3rd place, bronze medalist(s)		Collin Cameron	Canada

The Men's 7.5 kilometres competition of the 2018 Winter Paralympics was held at Alpensia Biathlon Centre, South Korea. The competition took place on 10 March 2018.

== Medal table ==
Rank	Nation	Gold	Silver	Bronze	Total
1	Ukraine (UKR)	1	0	2	3
2	France (FRA)	1	0	0	1
2	United States (USA)	1	0	0	1
4	Belarus (BLR)	0	2	0	2
5	Canada (CAN)	0	1	1	2
Totals (5 entries)		3	3	3	9

== Visually impaired ==
In the biathlon visually impaired, the athlete with a visual impairment has a sighted guide. The two skiers are considered a team, and dual medals are awarded.

The race was started at 14:00.

Rank	Bib	Name	Country	Misses	Real time	Calculated Time	Difference
1st place, gold medalist(s)	135	Vitaliy Lukyanenko; Guide: Ivan Marchyshak	Ukraine	0 (0+0)	19:51.0	19:51.0	–
2nd place, silver medalist(s)	127	Yury Holub; Guide: Dzmitry Budzilovich	Belarus	1 (0+1)	20:05.1	20:05.1	+14.1
3rd place, bronze medalist(s)	136	Anatolii Kovalevskyi; Guide: Oleksandr Mukshyn	Ukraine	1 (0+1)	20:42.5	20:30.1	+39.1
4	133	Iaroslav Reshetynskyi; Guide: Nazar Stefurak	Ukraine	1 (1+0)	20:46.3	20:33.8	+42.8
5	137	Iurii Utkin; Guide: Ruslan Perekhoda	Ukraine	2 (2+0)	21:36.1	21:23.1	+1:32.1
6	132	Dmytro Suiarko; Guide: Vasyl Potapenko	Ukraine	2 (0+2)	22:08.1	21:54.8	+2:03.8
7	128	Zebastian Modin; Guide: Johannes Andersson	Sweden	5 (4+1)	24:59.2	21:59.3	+2:08.3
8	130	Oleksandr Kazik; Guide: Sergiy Kucheryaviy	Ukraine	3 (2+1)	25:03.2	22:02.8	+2:11.8
9	129	Nico Messinger; Guide: Lutz Peter Klausmann	Germany	1 (1+0)	22:58.0	22:44.2	+2:53.2
10	134	Vasili Shaptsiaboi; Guide: Yuryi Liadau	Belarus	5 (3+2)	23:14.8	23:00.9	+3:09.9
11	131	Anthony Chalencon; Guide: Simon Valverde	France	3 (1+2)	27:02.5	23:47.8	+3:56.8
12	125	Oleksandr Makhotkin; Guide: Denys Nikulin	Ukraine	2 (1+1)	23:48.9	23:48.9	+3:57.9
13	126	Thomas Dubois; Guide: Bastien Sauvage	France	4 (3+1)	27:21.3	24:04.3	+4:13.3
14	122	Choi Bo-gue; Guide: Kim Hyun-woo	South Korea	1 (0+1)	25:19.2	25:19.2	+5:28.2
15	123	Kazuto Takamura; Guide: Yuhei Fujita	Japan	1+1	29:17.0	25:46.2	+5:55.2
16	124	Piotr Garbowski; Guide: Jakub Twardowski	Poland	7 (4+3)	26:32.2	26:32.2	+6:41.2
17	121	Kairat Kanafin; Guide: Anton Zhdanovich	Kazakhstan	5 (2+3)	27:07.8	26:51.5	+7:00.5

== Standing ==
The race was started at 12:05.

Rank	Bib	Name	Country	Misses	Real time	Calculated Time	Difference
1st place, gold medalist(s)	87	Benjamin Daviet	France	0 (0+0)	19:43.1	17:56.6	–
2nd place, silver medalist(s)	85	Mark Arendz	Canada	0 (0+0)	19:24.1	18:25.9	+29.3
3rd place, bronze medalist(s)	86	Ihor Reptyukh	Ukraine	1 (0+1)	19:27.6	18:40.9	+44.3
4	83	Grygorii Vovchynskyi	Ukraine	1 (1+0)	19:47.7	19:00.2	+1:03.6
5	80	Alexander Ehler	Germany	0 (0+0)	19:52.0	19:16.2	+1:19.6
6	84	Nils Erik Ulset	Norway	3 (2+1)	22:35.9	20:06.8	+2:10.2
7	74	Alexandr Gerlits	Kazakhstan	3 (2+1)	21:18.9	20:15.0	+2:18.4
8	72	Wu Junbao	China	1 (0+1)	23:11.4	20:24.4	+2:27.8
9	82	Keiichi Sato	Japan	1 (0+1)	21:19.3	20:28.1	+2:31.5
10	79	Steffen Lehmker	Germany	1 (1+0)	21:44.9	20:52.7	+2:56.1
11	77	Witold Skupień	Poland	3 (3+0)	23:57.5	21:05.0	+3:08.4
12	81	Vitalii Sytnyk	Ukraine	2 (0+2)	22:13.2	21:06.5	+3:09.9
13	75	Juha Harkonen	Finland	1 (0+1)	22:53.3	22:12.1	+4:15.5
14	76	Kwon Sang-hyeon	South Korea	3 (2+1)	23:17.2	22:21.3	+4:24.7
15	78	Serhii Romaniuk	Ukraine	4 (2+2)	23:45.9	22:48.9	+4:52.3
16	71	Ruslan Reiter	United States	4 (2+2)	23:52.9	22:55.6	+4:59.0
17	73	Masaru Hoshizawa	Japan	4 (1+3)	24:56.8	23:56.9	+6:00.3

== Sitting ==
The race was started at 10:25.

Rank	Bib	Name	Country	Misses	Real time	Calculated Time	Difference
1st place, gold medalist(s)	33	Daniel Cnossen	United States	1 (0+1)	23:49.7	23:49.7	–
2nd place, silver medalist(s)	37	Dzmitry Loban	Belarus	1 (1+0)	23:57.0	23:57.0	+7.3
3rd place, bronze medalist(s)	29	Collin Cameron	Canada	1 (0+1)	24:59.0	23:59.0	+9.3
4	39	Taras Rad	Ukraine	1 (0+1)	24:10.8	24:10.8	+21.1
5	38	Sin Eui-hyun	South Korea	2 (1+1)	24:19.9	24:19.9	+30.2
6	40	Martin Fleig	Germany	1 (0+1)	25:43.0	24:41.3	+51.6
7	31	Yauheni Lukyanenka	Belarus	0 (0+0)	25:02.2	25:02.2	+1:12.5
8	34	Andrew Soule	United States	3 (3+0)	25:08.3	25:08.3	+1:18.6
9	25	Derek Zaplotinsky	Canada	1 (0+1)	28:06.4	25:17.8	+1:28.1
10	35	Maksym Yarovyi	Ukraine	6 (2+4)	30:15.0	26:00.9	+2:11.2
11	30	Lee Jeong-min	South Korea	3 (0+3)	26:02.5	26:02.5	+2:12.8
12	32	Aaron Pike	United States	3 (3+0)	27:20.9	26:15.3	+2:25.6
13	23	Gao Xiaoming	China	4 (1+3)	26:26.2	26:26.2	+2:36.5
14	27	Du Mingyuan	China	4 (2+2)	26:36.6	26:36.6	+2:46.9
15	36	Trygve Steinar Larsen	Norway	4 (3+1)	26:37.3	26:37.3	+2:47.6
16	22	Sergey Ussoltsev	Kazakhstan	2 (0+2)	27:20.9	27:20.9	+3:31.2
17	28	Kamil Rosiek	Poland	2 (1+1)	27:25.6	27:25.6	+3:35.9
18	26	Scott Meenagh	Great Britain	4 (2+2)	27:28.1	27:28.1	+3:38.4
19	21	Jeremy Wagner	United States	1 (1+0)	29:43.8	28:32.4	+4:42.7
20	24	Bryan Price	United States	1 (1+0)	30:05.0	28:52.8	+5:03.1

== See also ==
- Biathlon at the 2018 Winter Olympics
