= Cross-country skiing at the 2018 Winter Paralympics – Men's 10 kilometre classical =

Men's 10 kilometre classical at the XII Paralympic Winter Games
- Paralympic cross-country skiing
- Venue: Jeongseon Alpine Centre, South Korea
- Dates: 17 March
- Competitors: 73 from 22 nations

Men's 10 kilometre classical (visually impaired) at the XII Paralympic Winter Games
- Competitors: 17 from 12 nations

Medalists
1st place, gold medalist(s)		Brian McKeever; Guide: Graham Nishikawa	Canada
2nd place, silver medalist(s)		Jake Adicoff; Guide: Sawyer Kesselheim	United States
3rd place, bronze medalist(s)		Yury Holub; Guide: Dzmitry Budzilovich	Belarus

Men's 10 kilometre classical (standing) at the XII Paralympic Winter Games
- Competitors: 23 from 14 nations

Medalists
1st place, gold medalist(s)		Yoshihiro Nitta	Japan
2nd place, silver medalist(s)		Grygorii Vovchynskyi	Ukraine
3rd place, bronze medalist(s)		Mark Arendz	Canada

Men's 7.5 kilometre (sitting) at the XII Paralympic Winter Games
- Competitors: 33 from 13 nations

Medalists
1st place, gold medalist(s)		Sin Eui-hyun	South Korea
2nd place, silver medalist(s)		Daniel Cnossen	United States
3rd place, bronze medalist(s)		Maksym Yarovyi	Ukraine

The Men's slalom competition of the 2018 Winter Paralympics was held at Jeongseon Alpine Centre, South Korea. The competition took place on 17 March 2018.

== Medal table ==
Rank	Nation	Gold	Silver	Bronze	Total
1	Canada (CAN)	1	0	1	2
2	Japan (JPN)	1	0	0	1
2	South Korea (KOR)*	1	0	0	1
4	United States (USA)	0	2	0	2
5	Ukraine (UKR)	0	1	1	2
6	Belarus (BLR)	0	0	1	1
Totals (6 entries)		3	3	3	9

== 10 km classical visually impaired ==
In the cross-country skiing visually impaired, the athlete with a visual impairment has a sighted guide. The two skiers are considered a team, and dual medals are awarded.

The race was started at 10:00.

Rank	Bib	Name	Country	Real Time	Calcuted Time	Difference
1st place, gold medalist(s)	76	Brian McKeever; Guide: Graham Nishikawa	Canada	23:17.8	23:17.8	–
2nd place, silver medalist(s)	75	Jake Adicoff; Guide: Sawyer Kesselheim	United States	24:31.3	24:31.3	+1:13.5
3rd place, bronze medalist(s)	73	Yury Holub; Guide: Dzmitry Budzilovich	Belarus	24:37.1	24:37.1	+1:19.3
4	74	Thomas Clarion; Guide: Antoine Bollet	France	28:25.8	25:01.1	+1:43.3
5	70	Iaroslav Reshetynskyi; Guide: Nazar Stefurak	Ukraine	25:53.5	25:38.0	+2:20.2
6	71	Dmytro Suiarko; Guide: Vasyl Potapenko	Ukraine	26:09.3	25:53.6	+2:35.8
7	72	Eirik Bye; Guide: Arvid Nelson	Norway	26:04.5	26:04.5	+2:46.7
8	68	Inkki Inola; Guide: Vili Sormunen	Finland	26:38.2	26:38.2	+3:20.4
9	69	Piotr Garbowski; Guide: Jakub Twardowski	Poland	27:16.5	27:16.5	+3:58.7
10	67	Thomas Dubois; Guide: Bastien Sauvage	France	31:22.9	27:37.0	+4:19.2
11	65	Kazuto Takamura; Guide: Yuhei Fujita	Japan	32:32.5	28:38.2	+5:20.4
12	64	Łukasz Kubica; Guide: Wojciech Suchwałko	Poland	28:46.3	28:46.3	+5:28.5
13	66	Oleksandr Makhotkin; Guide: Denys Nikulin	Ukraine	28:50.3	28:50.3	+5:32.5
14	62	Rudolf Klemetti; Guide: Jaakko Kallunki	Finland	29:05.4	29:05.4	+5:47.6
15	63	Choi Bo-gue; Guide: Kim Hyun-woo	South Korea	30:06.4	30:06.4	+6:48.6
16	61	Svetoslav Georgiev; Guide: Ivan Birnikov	Bulgaria	32:01.8	31:42.6	+8:24.8
	77	Zebastian Modin; Guide: Johannes Andersson	Sweden	DNF		

== 10 km classical standing ==
The race was started at 10:15.

Rank	Bib	Name	Country	Real Time	Calculated Time	Difference
1st place, gold medalist(s)	102	Yoshihiro Nitta	Japan	26:29.9	24:06.8	–
2nd place, silver medalist(s)	101	Grygorii Vovchynskyi	Ukraine	26:39.5	24:15.5	+8.7
3rd place, bronze medalist(s)	100	Mark Arendz	Canada	27:10.1	24:27.1	+20.3
4	104	Ihor Reptyukh	Ukraine	27:04.1	24:37.9	+31.1
5	103	Ilkka Tuomisto	Finland	27:10.0	24:43.3	+36.5
6	99	Witold Skupień	Poland	31:22.4	25:05.9	+59.1
7	98	Håkon Olsrud	Norway	27:40.9	25:11.4	+1:04.6
8	89	Ma Mingtao	China	31:56.3	25:33.0	+1:26.2
9	92	Alexander Ehler	Germany	26:44.6	25:40.4	+1:33.6
10	93	Taiki Kawayoke	Japan	32:17.4	25:49.9	+1:43.1
11	94	Keiichi Sato	Japan	28:26.9	25:53.3	+1:46.5
12	96	Serhii Romaniuk	Ukraine	28:27.5	25:53.8	+1:47.0
13	95	Vitalii Sytnyk	Ukraine	29:37.6	26:39.8	+2:33.0
14	91	Batmönkhiin Ganbold	Mongolia	30:10.1	27:09.1	+3:02.3
15	90	Alexandr Kolyadin	Kazakhstan	28:24.5	27:16.3	+3:09.5
16	87	Luca Tavasci	Switzerland	30:13.4	27:30.2	+3:23.4
17	97	Du Haitao	China	34:38.7	27:43.0	+3:36.2
18	86	Keigo Iwamoto	Japan	32:26.4	28:13.4	+4:06.6
19	88	Kwon Sang-hyeon	South Korea	31:40.1	28:49.1	+4:42.3
20	84	Johannes Birkelund	Norway	32:25.6	28:51.6	+4:44.8
21	83	Cristian Toninelli	Italy	32:50.0	29:52.7	+5:45.9
22	82	Aboulfazl Khatibi Mianaei	Iran	33:05.3	30:06.6	+5:59.8
23	85	Wang Chenyang	China	41:26.8	33:09.4	+9:02.6
	81	Antun Bošnjaković	Croatia	DNS		

== 7.5 km sitting ==
The race was started at 12:40.

Rank	Bib	Name	Country	Real Time	Calculated Time	Difference
1st place, gold medalist(s)	183	Sin Eui-hyun	South Korea	22:28.4	22:28.4	–
2nd place, silver medalist(s)	181	Daniel Cnossen	United States	22:33.7	22:33.7	+5.3
3rd place, bronze medalist(s)	184	Maksym Yarovyi	Ukraine	26:21.3	22:39.9	+11.5
4	175	Taras Rad	Ukraine	22:50.3	22:50.3	+21.9
5	182	Andrew Soule	United States	23:02.8	23:02.8	+34.4
6	178	Chris Klebl	Canada	24:55.2	23:25.5	+57.1
7	180	Martin Fleig	Germany	24:30.4	23:31.6	+1:03.2
8	173	Lee Jeong-min	South Korea	23:37.3	23:37.3	+1:08.9
9	169	Cristian Ribera	Brazil	25:12.3	23:41.6	+1:13.2
10	179	Dzmitry Loban	Belarus	24:12.7	24:12.7	+1:44.3
11	177	Trygve Steinar Larsen	Norway	24:20.1	24:20.1	+1:51.7
12	176	Yauheni Lukyanenka	Belarus	24:42.7	24:42.7	+2:14.3
13	172	Denis Petrenko	Kazakhstan	26:35.4	24:59.7	+2:31.3
14	164	Scott Meenagh	Great Britain	25:17.5	25:17.5	+2:49.1
15	170	Derek Zaplotinsky	Canada	28:12.4	25:23.2	+2:54.8
16	167	Sebastien Fortier	Canada	26:44.7	25:40.5	+3:12.1
17	157	Huang Feixiang	China	25:45.6	25:45.6	+3:17.2
18	168	Du Mingyuan	China	25:55.9	25:55.9	+3:27.5
19	171	Zheng Peng	China	30:11.6	25:58.0	+3:29.6
20	159	Sergey Ussoltsev	Kazakhstan	26:07.7	26:07.7	+3:39.3
21	165	Gao Xiaoming	China	26:09.3	26:09.3	+3:40.9
22	163	Arkadz Shykuts	Belarus	26:19.9	26:19.9	+3:51.5
23	166	Sean Halsted	United States	27:44.1	26:37.5	+4:09.1
24	161	Huang Bitao	China	27:13.9	27:13.9	+4:45.5
25	160	Lu Jingfeng	China	30:29.1	27:26.2	+4:57.8
26	162	Bryan Price	United States	29:00.9	27:51.3	+5:22.9
27	156	Xu Congjun	China	31:51.1	28:40.0	+6:11.6
28	155	Ethan Hess	Canada	28:51.0	28:51.0	+6:22.6
29	153	Vadzim Lipinski	Belarus	29:29.5	29:29.5	+7:01.1
30	154	Yves Bourque	Canada	31:31.7	30:16.0	+7:47.6
31	152	Temuri Dadiani	Georgia	32:42.2	30:44.5	+8:16.1
32	158	Jeremy Wagner	United States	33:32.7	33:32.7	+11:04.3
	174	Kamil Rosiek	Poland	DNF		
	151	Josip Zima	Croatia	DNS		

== See also ==
- Cross-country skiing at the 2018 Winter Olympics
