= Cross-country skiing at the 2018 Winter Paralympics – Men's 20 kilometre free =

Men's 20 kilometre free at the XII Paralympic Winter Games
- Paralympic cross-country skiing
- Venue: Alpensia Biathlon Centre, South Korea
- Dates: 11, 12 March
- Competitors: 61 from 20 nations

Men's 20 kilometre free (visually impaired) at the XII Paralympic Winter Games
- Competitors: 14 from 10 nations

Medalists
1st place, gold medalist(s)		Brian McKeever; Guide: Graham Nishikawa	Canada
2nd place, silver medalist(s)		Yury Holub; Guide: Dzmitry Budzilovich	Belarus
3rd place, bronze medalist(s)		Thomas Clarion; Guide: Antoine Bollet	France

Men's 20 kilometre free (standing) at the XII Paralympic Winter Games
- Competitors: 18 from 12 nations

Medalists
1st place, gold medalist(s)		Ihor Reptyukh	Ukraine
2nd place, silver medalist(s)		Benjamin Daviet	France
3rd place, bronze medalist(s)		Håkon Olsrud	Norway

Men's 15 kilometre (sitting) at the XII Paralympic Winter Games
- Competitors: 29 from 12 nations

Medalists
1st place, gold medalist(s)		Maksym Yarovyi	Ukraine
2nd place, silver medalist(s)		Daniel Cnossen	United States
3rd place, bronze medalist(s)		Sin Eui-hyun	South Korea

The Men's 20 kilometre free competition of the 2018 Winter Paralympics was held at Alpensia Biathlon Centre, South Korea. The competition took place on 11 & 12 March 2018.

== Medal table ==
Rank	Nation	Gold	Silver	Bronze	Total
1	Ukraine (UKR)	2	0	0	2
2	Canada (CAN)	1	0	0	1
3	France (FRA)	0	1	1	2
4	Belarus (BLR)	0	1	0	1
4	United States (USA)	0	1	0	1
6	Norway (NOR)	0	0	1	1
6	South Korea (KOR)	0	0	1	1
Totals (7 entries)		3	3	3	9

== 20 km free visually impaired ==
In the cross-country skiing visually impaired, the athlete with a visual impairment has a sighted guide. The two skiers are considered a team, and dual medals are awarded.

The race was started on 12 March at 10:25.

Rank	Bib	Name	Country	Real Time	Calculated Time	Difference
1st place, gold medalist(s)	33	Brian McKeever; Guide: Graham Nishikawa	Canada	46:02.4	46:02.4	–
2nd place, silver medalist(s)	30	Yury Holub; Guide: Dzmitry Budzilovich	Belarus	47:07.5	47:07.5	+1:05.1
3rd place, bronze medalist(s)	31	Thomas Clarion; Guide: Antoine Bollet	France	53:52.3	47:24.4	+1:22.0
4	34	Zebastian Modin; Guide: Johannes Andersson	Sweden	53:57.4	47:28.9	+1:26.5
5	32	Jake Adicoff; Guide: Sawyer Kesselheim	United States	49:43.0	49:43.0	+3:40.6
6	28	Oleksandr Kazik; Guide: Sergiy Kucheryaviy	Ukraine	58:23.4	51:23.0	+5:20.6
7	27	Anthony Chalençon; Guide: Simon Valverde	France	59:25.1	52:17.3	+6:14.9
8	29	Eirik Bye; Guide: Arvid Nelson	Norway	53:18.2	53:18.2	+7:15.8
9	26	Piotr Garbowski; Guide: Jakub Twardowski	Poland	53:46.4	53:46.4	+7:44.0
10	25	Inkki Inola; Guide: Vili Sormunen	Finland	54:10.5	54:10.5	+8:08.1
11	23	Kairat Kanafin; Guide: Anton Zhdanovich	Kazakhstan	56:30.4	55:56.5	+9:54.1
12	21	Rudolf Klemetti; Guide: Jaakko Kallunki	Finland	58:05.6	58:05.6	+12:03.2
13	22	Ŀukasz Kubica; Guide: Wojciech Suchwałko	Poland	1:01:13.9	1:01:13.9	+15:11.5
	24	Mikita Ladzesau; Guide: Aliaksei Lukyanau	Belarus	DNF		

== 20 km free standing ==
The race was started on 12 March at 10:00.

Rank	Bib	Name	Country	Real Time	Calculated Time	Difference
1st place, gold medalist(s)	17	Ihor Reptyukh	Ukraine	46:44.6	44:52.4	–
2nd place, silver medalist(s)	18	Benjamin Daviet	France	51:26.7	46:48.9	+1:56.5
3rd place, bronze medalist(s)	15	Håkon Olsrud	Norway	49:08.5	47:10.6	+2:18.2
4	12	Alexandr Gerlits	Kazakhstan	50:25.7	47:54.4	+3:02.0
5	16	Witold Skupień	Poland	55:44.1	49:02.8	+4:10.4
6	7	Steffen Lehmker	Germany	51:33.7	49:30.0	+4:37.6
7	13	Serhii Romaniuk	Ukraine	52:51.7	50:44.8	+5:52.4
8	10	Alexander Ehler	Germany	52:20.1	50:45.9	+5:53.5
9	11	Taiki Kawayoke	Japan	57:57.1	50:59.8	+6:07.4
10	5	Ma Mingtao	China	57:59.1	51:01.6	+6:09.2
11	2	Wang Chenyang	China	58:26.3	51:25.5	+6:33.1
12	4	Kwon Sang-hyeon	South Korea	55:35.0	53:21.6	+8:29.2
13	14	Du Haitao	China	1:01:59.4	54:33.1	+9:40.7
14	3	Luca Tavasci	Switzerland	57:10.0	54:52.8	+10:00.4
15	6	Wu Junbao	China	1:02:40.2	55:09.0	+10:16.6
16	9	Batmönkhiin Ganbold	Mongolia	58:27.4	55:32.0	+10:39.6
17	1	Cristian Toninelli	Italy	1:02:03.7	59:34.8	+14:42.4
18	8	Alexandr Kolyadin	Kazakhstan	1:02:27.1	1:00:34.7	+15:42.3

== 15 km sitting ==
The race was started on 11 March at 10:00.

Rank	Bib	Name	Country	Real Time	Calculated Time	Difference
1st place, gold medalist(s)	29	Maksym Yarovyi	Ukraine	48:23.5	41:37.0	
2nd place, silver medalist(s)	26	Daniel Cnossen	United States	42:20.7	42:20.7	+43.7
3rd place, bronze medalist(s)	28	Sin Eui-hyun	South Korea	42:28.9	42:28.9	+51.9
4	18	Zheng Peng	China	49:42.2	42:44.7	+1:07.7
5	24	Collin Cameron	Canada	45:30.1	43:40.9	+2:03.9
6	16	Cristian Ribera	Brazil	46:32.5	43:47.5	+2:10.5
7	22	Taras Rad	Ukraine	43:50.4	43:50.4	+2:13.4
8	25	Chris Klebl	Canada	46:42.1	43:54.0	+2:17.0
9	17	Derek Zaplotinsky	Canada	48:54.7	44:03.7	+2:26.7
10	20	Lee Jeong-min	South Korea	44:06.1	44:06.1	+2:29.1
11	27	Andrew Soule	United States	44:36.9	44:36.9	+2:59.9
12	19	Denis Petrenko	Kazakhstan	47:49.1	44:57.0	+3:20.0
13	23	Yauheni Lukyanenka	Belarus	45:13.9	45:13.9	+3:36.9
14	13	Gao Xiaoming	China	45:36.8	45:36.8	+3:59.8
15	9	Sergey Ussoltsev	Kazakhstan	45:38.2	45:38.2	+4:01.2
16	10	Huang Bitao	China	45:56.0	45:56.0	+4:19.0
17	12	Scott Meenagh	Great Britain	46:07.4	46:07.4	+4:30.4
18	15	Sébastien Fortier	Canada	48:22.1	46:26.0	+4:49.0
19	8	Huang Feixiang	China	47:30.0	47:30.0	+5:53.0
20	7	Xu Congjun	China	53:18.0	47:58.2	+6:21.2
21	21	Kamil Rosiek	Poland	48:35.5	48:35.5	+6:58.5
22	14	Sean Halsted	United States	50:39.6	48:38.0	+7:01.0
23	4	Vadzim Lipinski	Belarus	50:25.9	50:25.9	+8:48.9
24	6	Ethan Hess	Canada	52:14.6	52:14.6	+10:37.6
25	5	Yves Bourque	Canada	55:52.9	52:31.7	+10:54.7
26	2	Ma Yu-chol	North Korea	1:04:57.3	1:04:57.3	+23:20.3
27	1	Kim Jong-hyon	North Korea	1:12:49.9	1:12:49.9	+31:12.9
	3	Temuri Dadiani	Georgia	DNF		
	11	Arkadz Shykuts	Belarus	DNF		

== See also ==
- Cross-country skiing at the 2018 Winter Olympics
