= Biathlon at the 2018 Winter Paralympics – Men's 15 kilometres =

Men's 15 kilometres at the XII Paralympic Winter Games
- Paralympic biathlon
- Venue: Alpensia Biathlon Centre, South Korea
- Dates: 16 March
- Competitors: 47 from 14 nations

Men's 15 kilometres (visually impaired) at the XII Paralympic Winter Games
- Competitors: 15 from 8 nations

Medalists
1st place, gold medalist(s)		Vitaliy Lukyanenko; Guide: Ivan Marchyshak	Ukraine
2nd place, silver medalist(s)		Oleksandr Kazik; Guide: Sergiy Kucheryaviy	Ukraine
3rd place, bronze medalist(s)		Anthony Chalençon; Guide: Simon Valverde	France

Men's 15 kilometres (standing) at the XII Paralympic Winter Games
- Competitors: 15 from 11 nations

Medalists
1st place, gold medalist(s)		Mark Arendz	Canada
2nd place, silver medalist(s)		Benjamin Daviet	France
3rd place, bronze medalist(s)		Nils-Erik Ulset	Norway

Men's 15 kilometres (sitting) at the XII Paralympic Winter Games
- Competitors: 17 from 11 nations

Medalists
1st place, gold medalist(s)		Martin Fleig	Germany
2nd place, silver medalist(s)		Daniel Cnossen	United States
3rd place, bronze medalist(s)		Collin Cameron	Canada

The Men's 15 kilometres competition of the 2018 Winter Paralympics was held at Alpensia Biathlon Centre, South Korea. The competition took place on 16 March 2018.

== Medal table ==
Rank	Nation	Gold	Silver	Bronze	Total
1	Ukraine (UKR)	1	1	0	2
2	Canada (CAN)	1	0	1	2
3	Germany (GER)	1	0	0	1
4	France (FRA)	0	1	1	2
5	United States (USA)	0	1	0	1
6	Norway (NOR)	0	0	1	1
Totals (6 entries)		3	3	3	9

== Visually impaired ==
In the biathlon visually impaired, the athlete with a visual impairment has a sighted guide. The two skiers are considered a team, and dual medals are awarded.

The race was started at 14:50.

Rank	Bib	Name	Country	Misses	Real time	Calculated time	Results	Diff
1st place, gold medalist(s)	123	Vitaliy Lukyanenko; Guide: Ivan Marchyshak	Ukraine	1 (0+1+0+0)	44:12.9	44:12.9	45:12.9	–
2nd place, silver medalist(s)	118	Oleksandr Kazik; Guide: Sergiy Kucheryaviy	Ukraine	2 (0+0+1+1)	49:33.3	43:36.5	45:36.5	+23.6
3rd place, bronze medalist(s)	119	Anthony Chalencon; Guide: Simon Valverde	France	0 (0+0+0+0)	52:53.6	46:32.8	46:32.8	+1:19.9
4	124	Anatolii Kovalevskyi; Guide: Oleksandr Mukshyn	Ukraine	3 (0+2+0+1)	44:06.8	43:40.3	46:40.3	+1:27.4
4	125	Iurii Utkin; Guide: Ruslan Perekhoda	Ukraine	1 (0+0+1+0)	46:08.0	45:40.3	46:40.3	+1:27.4
6	120	Dmytro Suiarko; Guide: Vasyl Potapenko	Ukraine	4 (1+1+2+0)	45:15.5	44:48.3	48:48.3	+3:35.4
7	122	Vasili Shaptsiaboi; Guide: Yuryi Liadau	Belarus	4 (1+1+1+1)	46:17.6	45:49.8	49:49.8	+4:36.9
8	115	Oleksandr Makhotkin; Guide: Denys Nikulin	Ukraine	2 (0+0+2+0)	48:39.1	48:39.1	50:39.1	+5:26.2
9	116	Thomas Dubois; Guide: Bastien Sauvage	France	2 (0+1+0+1)	55:58.0	49:15.0	51:15.0	+6:02.1
10	117	Nico Messinger; Guide: Lutz Peter Klausmann	Germany	4 (0+1+1+2)	48:49.5	48:20.2	52:20.2	+7:07.3
11	121	Iaroslav Reshetynskiy; Guide: Nazar Stefurak	Ukraine	8 (2+4+2+0)	45:30.7	45:03.4	53:03.4	+7:50.5
12	112	Choi Bo-gue; Guide: Kim Hyun-woo	South Korea	2 (0+1+1+0)	53:59.8	53:59.8	55:59.8	+10:46.9
13	113	Kazuto Takamura; Guide: Yuhei Fujita	Japan	4 (0+2+0+2)	1:00:46.9	53:29.3	57:29.3	+12:16.4
14	111	Kairat Kanafin; Guide: Anton Zhdanovich	Kazakhstan	8 (2+3+2+1)	52:45.8	52:14.1	1:00:14.1	+15:01.2
	114	Piotr Garbowski; Guide: Jakub Twardowski	Poland	(3+3+ + )	DNF			

== Standing ==
The race was started at 13:00.

Rank	Bib	Name	Country	Misses	Real time	Calculated time	Result	Diff
1st place, gold medalist(s)	73	Mark Arendz	Canada	0 (0+0+0+0)	45:07.6	42:52.2	42:52.2	–
2nd place, silver medalist(s)	75	Benjamin Daviet	France	1 (0+0+1+0)	47:04.7	42:50.5	43:50.5	+58.3
3rd place, bronze medalist(s)	72	Nils-Erik Ulset	Norway	0 (0+0+0+0)	49:33.8	44:06.7	44:06.7	+1:14.5
4	71	Grygorii Vovchynskyi	Ukraine	1 (0+1+0+0)	45:37.3	43:47.8	44:47.8	+1:55.6
5	74	Ihor Reptyukh	Ukraine	3 (0+0+2+1)	43:47.3	42:02.2	45:02.2	+2:10.0
6	69	Vitalii Sytnyk	Ukraine	0 (0+0+0+0)	50:31.8	48:00.2	48:00.2	+5:08.0
7	64	Alexandr Gerlits	Kazakhstan	4 (0+3+0+1)	47:26.5	45:04.2	49:04.2	+6:12.0
8	70	Keiichi Sato	Japan	3 (2+0+1+0)	48:35.8	46:39.2	49:39.2	+6:47.0
9	66	Kwon Sang-hyeon	South Korea	2 (0+0+1+1)	50:51.8	48:49.7	50:49.7	+7:57.5
10	62	Wu Junbao	China	2 (0+0+1+1)	55:50.9	49:08.8	51:08.8	+8:16.6
11	68	Steffen Lehmker	Germany	6 (0+4+0+2)	47:09.6	45:16.4	51:16.4	+8:24.2
12	67	Serhii Romaniuk	Ukraine	6 (2+2+1+1)	47:49.5	45:54.7	51:54.7	+9:02.5
13	63	Masaru Hoshizawa	Japan	4 (1+0+2+1)	52:11.5	50:06.2	54:06.2	+11:14.0
14	65	Juha Harkonen	Finland	4 (1+1+0+2)	53:01.0	51:25.6	55:25.6	+12:33.4
15	61	Ruslan Reiter	United States	9 (2+3+1+3)	52:12.1	50:06.8	59:06.8	+16:14.6

== Sitting ==
The race was started at 10:20.

Rank	Bib	Name	Country	Misses	Real time	Calculated time	Result	Diff
1st place, gold medalist(s)	37	Martin Fleig	Germany	0 (0+0+0+0)	52:02.1	49:57.2	49:57.2	–
2nd place, silver medalist(s)	30	Daniel Cnossen	United States	1 (0+0+0+1)	49:42.7	49:42.7	50:42.7	+45.5
3rd place, bronze medalist(s)	26	Collin Cameron	Canada	1 (0+1+0+0)	52:04.1	49:59.1	50:59.1	+1:01.9
4	36	Taras Rad	Ukraine	2 (0+0+1+1)	49:03.6	49:03.6	51:03.6	+1:06.4
5	35	Sin Eui-hyun	South Korea	3 (0+2+0+1)	49:20.7	49:20.7	52:20.7	+2:23.5
6	29	Aaron Pike	United States	0 (0+0+0+0)	54:41.4	52:30.1	52:30.1	+2:32.9
7	27	Lee Jeong-min	South Korea	3 (1+1+1+0)	51:07.1	51:07.1	54:07.1	+4:09.9
8	28	Yauheni Lukyanenka	Belarus	2 (0+1+1+0)	52:21.8	52:21.8	54:21.8	+4:24.6
9	31	Andrew Soule	United States	4 (0+0+4+0)	50:51.2	50:51.2	54:51.2	+4:54.0
10	34	Dzmitry Loban	Belarus	4 (0+0+4+0)	52:10.1	52:10.1	56:10.1	+6:12.9
11	33	Trygve Steinar Larsen	Norway	4 (1+0+2+1)	52:20.9	52:20.9	56:20.9	+6:23.7
12	25	Kamil Rosiek	Poland	1 (0+0+1+0)	55:35.1	55:35.1	56:35.1	+6:37.9
13	21	Sergey Ussoltsev	Kazakhstan	3 (2+0+0+1)	55:34.8	55:34.8	58:34.8	+8:37.6
14	23	Scott Meenagh	Great Britain	5 (0+0+3+2)	53:58.1	53:58.1	58:58.1	+9:00.9
15	32	Maksym Yarovyi	Ukraine	9 (3+1+2+3)	59:02.5	50:46.6	59:46.6	+9:49.4
16	22	Gao Xiaoming	China	7 (3+0+1+3)	53:41.4	53:41.4	1:00:41.4	+10:44.2
17	24	Du Mingyuan	China	13 (4+3+4+2)	53:07.9	53:07.9	1:06:07.9	+16:10.7

== See also ==
- Biathlon at the 2018 Winter Olympics
