= Biathlon at the 2018 Winter Paralympics =

Biathlon at the XII Paralympic Winter Games
- Venue: Alpensia Biathlon Centre, South Korea
- Dates: 10, 13, 16 March

Biathlon at the 2018 Winter Paralympics was held at the Alpensia Biathlon Centre. The eighteen events took place on 10, 13 and 16 March 2018.

== Events ==
The program included six event types (three for men and three for women) that were divided into three classifications each (sitting, standing, and visually impaired), for a total of 18 events. Standing biathletes are those that have a locomotive disability but are able to use the same equipment as able-bodied skiers, whereas sitting competitors use a sitski. Skiers with a visual impairment compete with the help of a sighted guide and an acoustic aiming system. The skier with the visual impairment and the guide are considered a team, and dual medals are awarded.

Men's events

- 7.5 km
- 12.5 km
- 15 km

Women's events

- 6 km
- 10 km
- 12.5 km

== Competition schedule ==
The following is the competition schedule for all events.

All times are local (UTC+9).

Date	Time	Event
10 March	10:00	Women's 6 km – Sitting
10 March	10:25	Men's 7.5 km – Sitting
10 March	11:45	Women's 6 km – Standing
10 March	12:05	Men's 7.5 km – Standing
10 March	13:15	Women's 6 km – Visually impaired
10 March	14:00	Men's 7.5 km – Visually impaired
13 March	10:00	Women's 10 km – Sitting
13 March	10:55	Men's 12.5 km – Sitting
13 March	12:30	Women's 10 km – Standing
13 March	12:50	Men's 12.5 km – Standing
13 March	14:20	Women's 10 km – Visually impaired
13 March	14:40	Men's 12.5 km – Visually impaired
16 March	10:00	Women's 12.5 km – Sitting
16 March	10:20	Men's 15 km – Sitting
16 March	12:00	Women's 12.5 km – Standing
16 March	13:00	Men's 15 km – Standing
16 March	14:40	Women's 12.5 km – Visually impaired
16 March	14:50	Men's 15 km – Visually impaired

== Medal summary ==
=== Medal table ===
Rank	Nation	Gold	Silver	Bronze	Total
1	Neutral Paralympic Athletes (NPA)	5	5	1	11
2	Ukraine (UKR)	4	5	5	14
3	Germany (GER)	3	0	2	5
4	United States (USA)	2	4	1	7
5	France (FRA)	2	1	1	4
6	Belarus (BLR)	1	2	3	6
7	Canada (CAN)	1	1	4	6
8	Norway (NOR)	0	0	1	1
Totals (8 entries)		18	18	18	54

=== Women's events ===
Event	Class	Gold		Silver		Bronze	
6 kilometres	Visually impaired	Mikhalina Lysova; Guide: Alexey Ivanov; Neutral Paralympic Athletes	18:48.3	Oksana Shyshkova; Guide: Vitaliy Kazakov; Ukraine	19:26.4	Sviatlana Sakhanenka; Guide: Raman Yashchanka; Belarus	20:28.2
6 kilometres	Sitting	Kendall Gretsch; United States	21:52.0	Oksana Masters; United States	22:14.8	Lidziya Hrafeyeva; Belarus	22:16.3
6 kilometres	Standing	Ekaterina Rumyantseva; Neutral Paralympic Athletes	17:06.1	Anna Milenina; Neutral Paralympic Athletes	17:21.8	Liudmyla Liashenko; Ukraine	17:44.4
10 kilometres	Visually impaired	Oksana Shyshkova; Guide: Vitaliy Kazakov; Ukraine	37:58.9	Mikhalina Lysova; Guide: Alexey Ivanov; Neutral Paralympic Athletes	40:12.4	Clara Klug; Guide: Martin Hartl; Germany	42:01.6
10 kilometres	Sitting	Andrea Eskau; Germany	42:36.6	Marta Zaynullina; Neutral Paralympic Athletes	43:52.1	Irina Gulyayeva; Neutral Paralympic Athletes	44:25.5
10 kilometres	Standing	Ekaterina Rumyantseva; Neutral Paralympic Athletes	34:10.0	Anna Milenina; Neutral Paralympic Athletes	35:30.0	Liudmyla Liashenko; Ukraine	36:23.6
12.5 kilometres	Visually impaired	Mikhalina Lysova; Guide: Alexey Ivanov; Neutral Paralympic Athletes	37:42.6	Oksana Shyshkova; Guide: Vitaliy Kazakov; Ukraine	40:31.1	Clara Klug; Guide: Martin Hartl; Germany	41:05.9
12.5 kilometres	Sitting	Andrea Eskau; Germany	49:41.2	Oksana Masters; United States	50:00.0	Lidziya Hrafeyeva; Belarus	50:57.0
12.5 kilometres	Standing	Anna Milenina; Neutral Paralympic Athletes	38:56.8	Ekaterina Rumyantseva; Neutral Paralympic Athletes	39:00.6	Brittany Hudak; Canada	41:20.7

=== Men's events ===
Event	Class	Gold		Silver		Bronze	
7.5 kilometres	Visually impaired	Vitaliy Lukyanenko; Guide: Ivan Marchyshak; Ukraine	19:51.0	Yury Holub; Guide: Dzmitry Budzilovich; Belarus	20:05.1	Anatolii Kovalevskyi; Guide: Oleksandr Mukshyn; Ukraine	20:30.1
7.5 kilometres	Sitting	Daniel Cnossen; United States	23:49.7	Dzmitry Loban; Belarus	23:57.0	Collin Cameron; Canada	23:59.0
7.5 kilometres	Standing	Benjamin Daviet; France	17:56.6	Mark Arendz; Canada	18:25.9	Ihor Reptyukh; Ukraine	18:40.9
12.5 kilometres	Visually impaired	Yury Holub; Guide: Dzmitry Budzilovich; Belarus	39:23.7	Oleksandr Kazik; Guide: Sergiy Kucheryaviy; Ukraine	39:26.1	Iurii Utkin; Guide: Ruslan Perekhoda; Ukraine	40:19.4
12.5 kilometres	Sitting	Taras Rad; Ukraine	45:35.6	Daniel Cnossen; United States	46:37.3	Andrew Soule; United States	47:08.7
12.5 kilometres	Standing	Benjamin Daviet; France	35:25.3	Ihor Reptyukh; Ukraine	35:31.8	Mark Arendz; Canada	35:54.7
15 kilometres	Visually impaired	Vitaliy Lukyanenko; Guide: Ivan Marchyshak; Ukraine	45:12.9	Oleksandr Kazik; Guide: Sergiy Kucheryaviy; Ukraine	45:36.5	Anthony Chalencon; Guide: Simon Valverde; France	46:32.8
15 kilometres	Sitting	Martin Fleig; Germany	49:57.2	Daniel Cnossen; United States	50:42.7	Collin Cameron; Canada	50:59.1
15 kilometres	Standing	Mark Arendz; Canada	42:52.2	Benjamin Daviet; France	43:50.5	Nils-Erik Ulset; Norway	44:06.7

== See also ==
- Biathlon at the 2018 Winter Olympics
- Multi-Medallists - biathlon IPC – Official website
