= 2018 Winter Paralympics Parade of Nations =

During the 2018 Winter Paralympics Parade of Nations at the 2018 Winter Paralympics opening ceremony, beginning at 20:00 KST (UTC+9) on 9 March 2018, athletes bearing the flags of their respective nations led their national delegations as they paraded into the Pyeongchang Olympic Stadium in the host city of Pyeongchang, South Korea.

== Background ==
All teams entered in alphabetical order based on the names of countries in the Korean language, except host nation South Korea, marched last. The collation method used is based on the names as written in Hangul, the Korean alphabet. The names of the nations were announced English and Korean, the official languages of the Paralympic movement and the host nation, in accordance with traditional and International Paralympic Committee (IPC) guidelines.

Whilst most countries entered under their short names, a few entered under more formal or alternative names, sometimes due to political or naming disputes. North Korean and South Korean teams marched on their own, after the leaders of both Koreas failed to arrange for both teams to march together in the opening ceremony. After a Russian state-sponsored doping program was exposed following the 2014 Winter Paralympics, the Russian Paralympic Committee was suspended, and selected athletes were allowed to compete neutrally under the IOC designation of "Neutral Paralympic Athletes" (패럴림픽 중립 선수), under 중. In addition, the United States, Iran, North Korea, China and South Korea all entered under their formal names, respectively the "United States of America", "Islamic Republic of Iran", "Democratic People's Republic of Korea", "People's Republic of China" and "Republic of Korea".

A record of 49 nations entered the stadium with a combined total of 569 athletes. Three nations made their Winter Paralympic debut, namely Georgia, North Korea and Tajikistan.

== List ==
Below is a list of parading countries and their announced flag bearer, in the same order as the parade. This is sortable by country name, flag bearer's name and flag bearer's sport. Names are given in the form officially designated by the IPC.

Order	Nation	Hangul	Roman Transliteration	Flag bearer	Sport
1	Greece	그리스	geu ri seu	Konstantinos Petrakis	Snowboarding
2	Netherlands	네덜란드	ne deol ran deu	Bibian Mentel-Spee	Snowboarding
3	Norway	노르웨이	no reu we i	Birgit Skarstein	Cross-country skiing
4	New Zealand	뉴질랜드	nyu jil raen deu	Corey Peters	Alpine skiing
5	Denmark	덴마크	den ma keu	Daniel Wagner	Snowboarding
6	Germany	독일	dok il	Andrea Eskau	Biathlon; Cross-country skiing
7	Romania	루마니아	ru ma ni a	Mihaita Papara	Snowboarding
8	Mexico	멕시코	mek si ko	Arly Velásquez	Alpine skiing
9	Mongolia	몽골	mong gol	Batmönkhiin Ganbold	Cross-country skiing
10	United States	미국	mi guk	Mike Schultz	Snowboarding
11	Belgium	벨기에	bel gi e	Eléonor Sana	Alpine skiing
12	Belarus	벨라루스	bel ra ru seu	Liudmila Vauchok	Cross-country skiing
13	Bosnia and Herzegovina	보스니아 헤르체고비나	bo seu ni a he reu che go bi na	Ilma Kazazić	Alpine skiing
14	Bulgaria	불가리아	bul ga ri a	Svetoslav Georgiev	Cross-country skiing
15	Brazil	브라질	beu ra jil	Aline Rocha	Cross-country skiing
16	Serbia	세르비아	se reu bi a	Miloš Zarić	Cross-country skiing
17	Sweden	스웨덴	seu we den	Ronny Persson	Wheelchair curling
18	Switzerland	스위스	seu wi seu	Felix Wagner	Wheelchair curling
19	Spain	스페인	seu pe in	Astrid Fina	Snowboarding
20	Slovakia	슬로바키아	seul ro ba ki a	Henrieta Farkašová & Natália Šubrtová	Alpine skiing
21	Slovenia	슬로베니아	seul ro be ni a	Jernej Slivnik	Alpine skiing
22	Armenia	아르메니아	a reu me ni a	Stasik Nazaryan	Cross-country skiing
23	Argentina	아르헨티나	a reu hen ti na	Enrique Plantey	Alpine skiing
24	Iceland	아이슬란드	a i seul ran deu	Hilmar Snær Örvarsson	Alpine skiing
25	Andorra	안도라	an do ra	Roger Puig Davi	Alpine skiing
26	Great Britain	영국	yeong guk	Owen Pick	Snowboarding
27	Australia	오스트레일리아	o seu teu re il ri a	Joany Badenhorst	Snowboarding
28	Austria	오스트리아	o seu teu ri a	Claudia Loesch	Alpine skiing
29	Uzbekistan	우즈베키스탄	u jeu be ki seu tan	Yokutkhon Kholbekova	Cross-country skiing
30	Ukraine	우크라이나	u keu ra i na	Vitaliy Lukyanenko	Biathlon; Cross-country skiing
31	Iran	이란	i ran	Elaheh Gholifallah	Cross-country skiing
32	Italy	이탈리아	i tal ri a	Florian Planker	Para ice hockey
33	Japan	일본	il bon	Momoka Muraoka	Alpine skiing
34	North Korea	조선민주주의인민공화국	jo seon min ju ju ui in min gong hwa guk	Kim Jong-hyon	Cross-country skiing
35	Georgia	조지아	jo ji a	Temuri Dadiani	Cross-country skiing
36	China	중국	jung guk	Peng Yuanyuan	Cross-country skiing
37	Neutral Paralympic Athletes	패럴림픽 중립 선수	pae reol lim pik jung nip seon su	POCOG Volunteer	N/A
38	Czech Republic	체코	che ko	Miroslav Hrbek	Para ice hockey
39	Chile	칠레	chil re	Diego Seguel	Alpine skiing
40	Kazakhstan	카자흐스탄	ka ja heu seu tan	Kairat Kanafin	Cross-country skiing
41	Canada	캐나다	kae na da	Brian McKeever	Cross-country skiing
42	Croatia	크로아티아	keu ro a ti a	Eva Goluža	Alpine skiing
43	Tajikistan	타지키스탄	ta ji ki seu tan	Siyovush Ilyasov	Cross-country skiing
44	Turkey	터키	teo ki	Mehmet Çekiç	Alpine skiing
45	Poland	폴란드	pol ran deu	Kamil Rosiek	Biathlon; Cross-country skiing
46	France	프랑스	peu rang seu	Marie Bochet	Alpine skiing
47	Finland	핀란드	pin ran deu	Matti Suur-Hamari	Snowboarding
48	Hungary	헝가리	heong ga ri	Zsolt Balogh	Alpine skiing
49	South Korea	대한민국	dae han min guk	Sin Eui-hyun	Biathlon; Cross-country skiing

== See also ==
- 2018 Winter Olympics Parade of Nations
