= Finland at the 2018 Winter Paralympics =

- Flag of Finland
- IPC code: FIN
- NPC: Finnish Paralympic Committee
- Website: www.paralympia.fi/en

in Pyeongchang, South Korea 9-18 March 2018
- Competitors: 13 in 5 sports
- Flag bearer: Matti Suur-Hamari
- Medals Ranked 16th: Gold 1 Silver 0 Bronze 2 Total 3

Winter Paralympics appearances (overview)
- 1976; 1980; 1984; 1988; 1992; 1994; 1998; 2002; 2006; 2010; 2014; 2018; 2022; 2026

Finland competed at the 2018 Winter Paralympics in PyeongChang, South Korea, from 9 to 18 March 2018.

== Medalists ==
Finnish Paralympic Committee has announced a medal target of 3 medals, which Finland managed to win.

Medals by sport
Sport	1st place, gold medalist(s)	2nd place, silver medalist(s)	3rd place, bronze medalist(s)	Total
Cross-country skiing	0	0	1	1
Snowboarding	1	0	1	2
Total	1	0	2	3

Medal	Name	Sport	Event	Date
Gold	Matti Suur-Hamari	Snowboarding	Men's snowboard cross SB-LL2	12 March
Bronze	Ilkka Tuomisto	Cross-country skiing	Men's 1.5 km sprint classical, standing	14 March
Bronze	Matti Suur-Hamari	Snowboarding	Men's banked slalom SB-LL2	16 March

== Alpine skiing ==
Men

Athlete	Event	Run 1		Run 2		Total	
Athlete	Event	Time	Rank	Time	Rank	Time	Rank
Santeri Kiiveri	Super combined, standing	1:28.92	6	48.86	5	2:17.78	6
Santeri Kiiveri	Downhill, standing	—N/a				1:30.64	13
Santeri Kiiveri	Giant slalom, standing	1:08.64	8	1:07.62	7	2:16.26	6
Santeri Kiiveri	Slalom, standing	49.61	6	50.14	4	1:39.75	4
Santeri Kiiveri	Super-G, standing	—N/a				1:30.03	11

== Biathlon ==
Men

Athlete	Event	Real Time	Calculation Time	Misses	Result	Rank
Juha Härkönen	7.5 km, standing	22:53.3	22:12.1	1 (0+1)	22:12.1	13
Juha Härkönen	12.5 km, standing	45:04.1	43:43.0	0 (0+0+0+0)	43:43.0	10
Juha Härkönen	15 km, standing	53:01.0	51:25.6	4 (1+1+0+2)	55:25.6	14

Women

Athlete	Event	Real Time	Calculation Time	Misses	Result	Rank
Sini Pyy	6 km, sitting	Did not finish				
Sini Pyy	12.5 km, sitting	1:03:24.1	59:35.9	7 (2+1+2+2)	1:06:35.9	14

== Cross-country skiing ==
Distance
Men

Athlete	Event	Real Time	Time	Rank
Inkki Inola; Guide: Vili Sormunen	10 km classical, visually impaired	26:38.2	26:38.2	8
Inkki Inola; Guide: Vili Sormunen	20 km free, visually impaired	54:10.5	54:10.5	10
Rudolf Klemetti; Guide: Jaakko Kallunki	10 km classical, visually impaired	29:05.4	29:05.4	14
Rudolf Klemetti; Guide: Jaakko Kallunki	20 km free, visually impaired	58:05.6	58:05.6	12
Ilkka Tuomisto	10 km classical, standing	27:10.0	24:43.3	5

Women

Athlete	Event	Real Time	Time	Rank
Sini Pyy	5 km, sitting	20:54.7	19:39.4	14

Mixed

Athlete	Event	Time	Deficit	Rank
Sini Pyy; Inkki Inola; Guide: Vili Sormunen; Sini Pyy; Ilkka Tuomisto	4 x 2.5 km mixed relay	28:11.0	+3:39.1	10

Sprint
Men

Athlete	Event	Qualification			Semifinal		Final	
Athlete	Event	Real Time	Calculated Time	Rank	Time	Rank	Time	Rank
Inkki Inola; Guide: Vili Sormunen	Sprint, visually impaired	3:52.10	3:52.10	7 Q	4:17.6	4	DNA	
Rudolf Klemetti; Guide: Jaakko Kallunki	Sprint, visually impaired	4:28.36	4:28.36	17	Did not advance			
Ilkka Tuomisto	Sprint, standing	4:03.91	3:41.96	7 Q	4:53.8	3 Q	4:20.8	3rd place, bronze medalist(s)

Women

Athlete	Event	Qualification			Semifinal		Final	
Athlete	Event	Real Time	Calculated Time	Rank	Time	Rank	Time	Rank
Sini Pyy	Sprint, sitting	4:10.54	3:55.51	13	Did not advance			

== Snowboarding ==
Banked slalom

Athlete	Event	Run 1	Run 2	Run 3	Best	Rank
Matti Suur-Hamari	Men's banked slalom SB-LL2	51.05	51.64	49.51	49.51	3rd place, bronze medalist(s)
Matti Sairanen	Men's banked slalom SB-UL	DNF	DNF	1:02.45	1:02.45	20

Snowboard cross

Athlete	Event	Qualification				Round of 16	Quarterfinal	Semifinal	Final	Rank
Athlete	Event	Run 1	Run 2	Best	Rank	Round of 16	Quarterfinal	Semifinal	Final	Rank
Matti Suur-Hamari	Men's snowboard cross SB-LL2	58.35	1:01.28	58.35	2 Q	Osharov (UKR); W	Murphy (NZL); W	Strong (USA); W	Gabel (USA); W	1st place, gold medalist(s)
Matti Sairanen	Men's snowboard cross SB-UL	1:07.89	1:11.81	1:07.89	17	Did not advance				17

== Wheelchair curling ==
Summary

Team	Event	Group stage												Tiebreaker	Semifinal	Final / BM	
Team	Event	Opposition Score	Opposition Score	Opposition Score	Opposition Score	Opposition Score	Opposition Score	Opposition Score	Opposition Score	Opposition Score	Opposition Score	Opposition Score	Rank	Opposition Score	Opposition Score	Opposition Score	Rank
Markku Karjalainen; Yrjö Jääskeläinen; Sari Karjalainen; Riitta Särösalo; Vesa Leppänen	Mixed	(Slovakia) SVK; L 6–7	(International Olympic Committee) NPA; L 5–12	(United Kingdom) GBR; L 2–9	(China) CHN; L 4–6	(United States) USA; W 8–5	(South Korea) KOR; L 3–11	(Switzerland) SUI; L 7–10	(Sweden) SWE; W 6–5	(Norway) NOR; L 4–6	(Canada) CAN; L 4–8	(Germany) GER; L 4–8	11	Did not advance			

Pos	Team	Pld	W	L	PF	PA	PD	PCT	Ends Won	Ends Lost	Blank Ends	Stolen Ends	Shot %	Qualification
1	South Korea	11	9	2	65	51	14	0.818	38	36	9	11	66%	Advance to playoffs
2	Canada	11	9	2	74	45	29	0.818	47	28	6	27	62%	Advance to playoffs
3	China	11	9	2	85	42	43	0.818	43	32	2	16	67%	Advance to playoffs
4	Norway	11	7	4	55	57	−2	0.636	41	35	5	15	58%	Advance to playoffs
5	Neutral Paralympic Athletes	11	5	6	61	63	−2	0.455	44	37	2	23	62%	
6	Switzerland	11	5	6	56	63	−7	0.455	36	45	2	11	61%	
7	Great Britain	11	5	6	57	53	4	0.455	41	41	6	20	62%	
8	Germany	11	5	6	57	68	−11	0.455	37	39	5	16	54%	
9	Slovakia	11	4	7	62	72	−10	0.364	39	46	1	11	57%	
10	Sweden	11	4	7	47	66	−19	0.364	29	45	8	8	57%	
11	Finland	11	2	9	53	87	−34	0.182	35	46	1	11	51%	
12	United States	11	2	9	58	63	−5	0.182	37	45	3	12	60%	

Source: Paralympic.org

Round-robin

Finland has a bye in draws 1, 3, 8, 11, 13 and 15.

Draw 2

Saturday, 10 March, 19:35

Sheet C	1	2	3	4	5	6	7	8	Final
Slovakia (Ďuriš) 🔨	1	0	0	2	0	3	1	0	7
Finland (S. Karjalainen)	0	1	1	0	1	0	0	3	6

Draw 4

Sunday, 11 March, 14:35

Sheet A	1	2	3	4	5	6	7	8	Final
Neutral Paralympic Athletes (Kurokhtin)	3	0	0	0	1	3	5	X	12
Finland (S. Karjalainen) 🔨	0	1	2	2	0	0	0	X	5

Draw 5

Sunday, 11 March, 19:35

Sheet B	1	2	3	4	5	6	7	8	Final
Great Britain (Neilson)	2	0	0	1	2	2	2	X	9
Finland (S. Karjalainen) 🔨	0	1	1	0	0	0	0	X	2

Draw 6

Monday, 12 March, 9:35

Sheet D	1	2	3	4	5	6	7	8	Final
Finland (S. Karjalainen) 🔨	0	0	1	0	2	0	1	X	4
China (Wang)	1	2	0	2	0	1	0	X	6

Draw 7

Monday, 12 March, 14:35

Sheet C	1	2	3	4	5	6	7	8	Final
Finland (S. Karjalainen) 🔨	0	0	4	0	1	0	1	2	8
United States (Black)	1	1	0	2	0	1	0	0	5

Draw 9

Tuesday, 13 March, 9:35

Sheet A	1	2	3	4	5	6	7	8	Final
Finland (S. Karjalainen)	0	0	1	1	0	1	0	X	3
South Korea (Seo) 🔨	4	0	0	0	4	0	3	X	11

Draw 10

Tuesday, 13 March, 14:35

Sheet D	1	2	3	4	5	6	7	8	Final
Finland (S. Karjalainen)	0	0	3	0	1	2	1	0	7
Switzerland (Wagner) 🔨	3	2	0	3	0	0	0	2	10

Draw 12

Wednesday, 14 March, 9:35

Sheet A	1	2	3	4	5	6	7	8	Final
Finland (S. Karjalainen) 🔨	2	0	1	2	0	0	1	0	6
Sweden (Petersson Dahl)	0	1	0	0	2	1	0	1	5

Draw 14

Wednesday, 14 March, 19:35

Sheet D	1	2	3	4	5	6	7	8	Final
Norway (Lorentsen) 🔨	2	2	0	1	0	1	0	X	6
Finland (S. Karjalainen)	0	0	1	0	1	0	2	X	4

Draw 16

Thursday, 15 March, 14:35

Sheet C	1	2	3	4	5	6	7	8	Final
Canada (Ideson) 🔨	0	0	1	1	1	0	3	2	8
Finland (Karjalainen)	2	1	0	0	0	1	0	0	4

Draw 17

Thursday, 15 March, 19:35

Sheet B	1	2	3	4	5	6	7	8	Final
Finland (S. Karjalainen) 🔨	2	0	0	0	2	0	0	X	4
Germany (Putzich)	0	1	1	1	0	3	2	X	8

== See also ==
- Finland at the 2018 Winter Olympics
