= Biathlon at the 2018 Winter Paralympics – Men's 12.5 kilometres =

Men's 12.5 kilometres at the XII Paralympic Winter Games
- Paralympic biathlon
- Venue: Alpensia Biathlon Centre, South Korea
- Dates: 13 March
- Competitors: 46 from 17 nations

Men's 12.5 kilometres (visually impaired) at the XII Paralympic Winter Games
- Competitors: 15 from 7 nations

Medalists
1st place, gold medalist(s)		Yury Holub; Guide: Dzmitry Budzilovich	Belarus
2nd place, silver medalist(s)		Oleksandr Kazik; Guide: Sergiy Kucheryaviy	Ukraine
3rd place, bronze medalist(s)		Iurii Utkin; Guide: Ruslan Perekhoda	Ukraine

Men's 12.5 kilometres (standing) at the XII Paralympic Winter Games
- Competitors: 14 from 11 nations

Medalists
1st place, gold medalist(s)		Benjamin Daviet	France
2nd place, silver medalist(s)		Ihor Reptyukh	Ukraine
3rd place, bronze medalist(s)		Mark Arendz	Canada

Men's 12.5 kilometres (sitting) at the XII Paralympic Winter Games
- Competitors: 17 from 10 nations

Medalists
1st place, gold medalist(s)		Taras Rad	Ukraine
2nd place, silver medalist(s)		Daniel Cnossen	United States
3rd place, bronze medalist(s)		Andrew Soule	United States

The Men's 12.5 kilometres competition of the 2018 Winter Paralympics was held at Alpensia Biathlon Centre, South Korea. The competition took place on 13 March 2018.

== Medal table ==
Rank	Nation	Gold	Silver	Bronze	Total
1	Ukraine (UKR)	1	2	1	4
2	Belarus (BLR)	1	0	0	1
2	France (FRA)	1	0	0	1
4	United States (USA)	0	1	1	2
5	Canada (CAN)	0	0	1	1
Totals (5 entries)		3	3	3	9

== Visually impaired ==
In the biathlon visually impaired, the athlete with a visual impairment has a sighted guide. The two skiers are considered a team, and dual medals are awarded.

The race was started at 14:40.

Rank	Bib	Name	Country	Misses	Real time	Calculated time	Difference
1st place, gold medalist(s)	116	Yury Holub; Guide: Dzmitry Budzilovich	Belarus	5 (1+2+1+1)	39:23.7	39:23.7	–
2nd place, silver medalist(s)	118	Oleksandr Kazik; Guide: Sergiy Kucheryaviy	Ukraine	2 (0+0+1+1)	44:48.7	39:26.1	+2.4
3rd place, bronze medalist(s)	125	Iurii Utkin; Guide: Ruslan Perekhoda	Ukraine	2 (2+0+0+0)	40:43.8	40:19.4	+55.7
4	123	Vitaliy Lukyanenko; Guide: Ivan Marchyshak	Ukraine	3 (2+0+1+0)	40:19.8	40:19.8	+56.1
5	119	Anthony Chalencon; Guide: Simon Valverde	France	3 (1+0+1+1)	47:57.3	42:12.0	+2:48.3
6	122	Vasily Shaptsiaboi; Guide: Yuryi Liadov	Belarus	5 (3+0+1+1)	42:45.3	42:19.6	+2:55.9
7	121	Iaroslav Reshetynskyi; Guide: Nazar Stefurak	Ukraine	3 (1+0+1+1)	43:26.9	43:00.8	+3:37.1
8	124	Anatolii Kovalevskyi; Guide: Oleksandr Mukshyn	Ukraine	6 (3+3+0+0)	44:56.1	44:29.1	+5:05.4
9	120	Dmytro Suiarko; Guide: Vasyl Potapenko	Ukraine	3 (0+2+1+0)	45:16.7	44:49.5	+5:25.8
10	114	Oleksandr Makhotkin; Guide: Denys Nikulin	Ukraine	6 (3+2+1+0)	47:28.8	47:28.8	+8:05.1
11	115	Thomas Dubois; Guide: Bastien Sauvage	France	9 (3+3+3+0)	57:49.3	50:53.0	+11:29.3
12	113	Piotr Garbowski; Guide: Jakub Twardowski	Poland	11 (2+3+2+4)	53:11.7	53:11.7	+13:48.0
13	112	Choi Bo-gue; Guide: Kim Hyun-woo	South Korea	6 (3+1+0+2)	53:20.8	53:20.8	+13:57.1
14	111	Kairat Kanafin; Guide: Anton Zhdanovich	Kazakhstan	11 (2+2+3+4)	56:32.4	55:58.5	+16:34.8
	117	Nico Messinger; Guide: Lutz Peter Klausmann	Germany	5 (0+2+2+1)	DNF		

== Standing ==
The race was started at 12:50.

Rank	Bib	Name	Country	Misses	Real time	Calculated time	Difference
1st place, gold medalist(s)	74	Benjamin Daviet	France	1 (0+0+0+1)	38:55.5	35:25.3	–
2nd place, silver medalist(s)	73	Ihor Reptyukh	Ukraine	1 (0+0+1+0)	37:00.6	35:31.8	+6.5
3rd place, bronze medalist(s)	72	Mark Arendz	Canada	1 (0+0+0+1)	37:48.1	35:54.7	+29.4
4	71	Nils Erik Ulset	Norway	2 (1+1+0+0)	45:18.4	40:19.4	+4:54.1
5	68	Steffen Lehmker	Germany	2 (1+0+0+1)	42:32.5	40:50.4	+5:25.1
6	64	Alexandr Gerlits	Kazakhstan	6 (1+1+3+1)	43:00.3	40:51.3	+5:26.0
7	67	Serhii Romaniuk	Ukraine	5 (0+0+3+2)	42:38.6	40:56.3	+5:31.0
8	69	Vitalii Sytnyk	Ukraine	3 (0+0+1+2)	43:42.4	41:31.3	+6:06.0
9	70	Keiichi Sato	Japan	4 (0+1+2+1)	43:56.7	42:11.2	+6:45.9
10	65	Juha Harkonen	Finland	0 (0+0+0+0)	45:04.1	43:43.0	+8:17.7
11	61	Ruslan Reiter	United States	4 (0+2+1+1)	45:35.3	43:45.9	+8:20.6
12	66	Kwon Sang-hyeon	South Korea	5 (0+1+2+2)	46:34.0	44:42.2	+9:16.9
13	62	Wu Junbao	China	4 (1+0+0+3)	50:55.4	44:48.8	+9:23.5
14	63	Masaru Hoshizawa	Japan	10 (2+3+4+1)	58:46.1	56:25.1	+20:59.8

== Sitting ==
The race was started at 10:55.

Rank	Bib	Name	Country	Misses	Real time	Calculated time	Difference
1st place, gold medalist(s)	36	Taras Rad	Ukraine	0 (0+0+0+0)	45:35.6	45:35.6	–
2nd place, silver medalist(s)	32	Daniel Cnossen	United States	0 (0+0+0+0)	46:37.3	46:37.3	+1:01.7
3rd place, bronze medalist(s)	33	Andy Soule	United States	2 (0+0+2+0)	47:08.7	47:08.7	+1:33.1
4	37	Martin Fleig	Germany	1 (0+0+1+0)	50:02.8	48:02.7	+2:27.1
5	35	Sin Eui-hyun	South Korea	7 (1+4+1+1)	50:01.9	50:01.9	+4:26.3
6	34	Dzmitry Loban	Belarus	4 (0+2+1+1)	50:52.7	50:52.7	+5:17.1
7	31	Aaron Pike	United States	1 (0+0+0+1)	53:07.7	51:00.2	+5:24.6
8	30	Yauheni Lukyanenka	Belarus	5 (0+2+0+3)	51:45.0	51:45.0	+6:09.4
9	29	Lee Jeong-min	South Korea	5 (1+2+0+2)	51:51.5	51:51.5	+6:15.9
10	22	Gao Xiaoming	China	3 (1+1+1+0)	51:51.6	51:51.6	+6:16.0
11	21	Sergey Ussoltsev	Kazakhstan	4 (1+3+0+0)	53:36.8	53:36.8	+8:01.2
12	25	Derek Zaplotinsky	Canada	5 (2+1+1+1)	59:54.9	53:55.4	+8:19.8
13	26	Scott Meenagh	Great Britain	5 (1+2+1+1)	54:52.9	54:52.9	+9:17.3
14	24	Sean Halsted	United States	5 (2+0+1+2)	58:05.3	55:45.9	+10:10.3
15	28	Kamil Rosiek	Poland	5 (1+1+2+1)	56:29.0	56:29.0	+10:53.4
16	23	Jeremy Wagner	United States	10 (3+1+2+4)	1:04:31.9	1:01:57.0	+16:21.4
	27	Du Mingyuan	China	(3+3++)	DNF		

== See also ==
- Biathlon at the 2018 Winter Olympics
