= Mark Arendz =

Canadian Para cross-country skier and biathlete (1990)

Mark Arendz OPEI
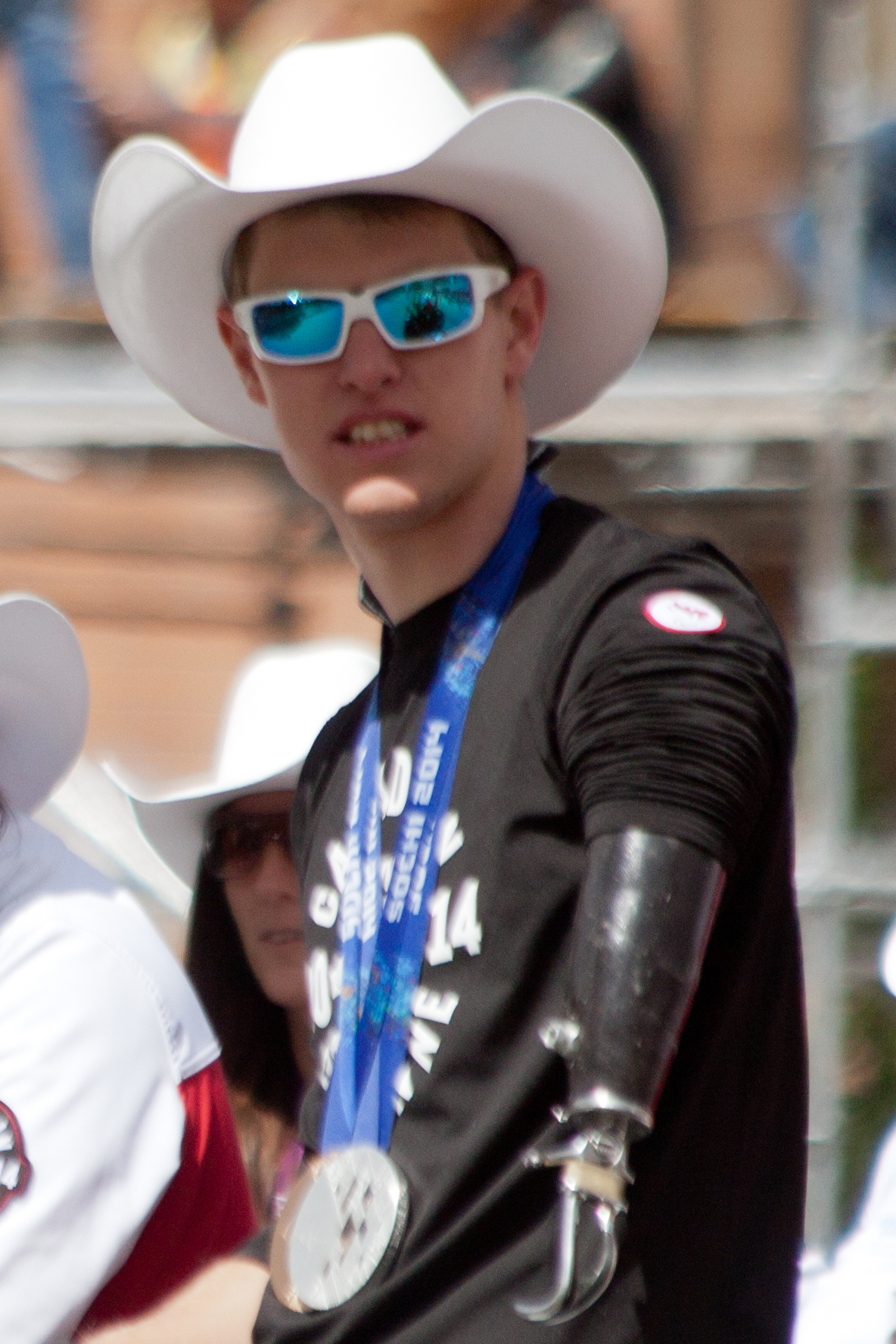
- Arendz in 2014

Personal information
- Born: March 3, 1990 (age 36) Charlottetown, Prince Edward Island, Canada
- Height: 193 cm (6 ft 4 in)
- Weight: 75 kg (165 lb)

Sport
- Country: Canada
- Sport: Para Nordic skiing (Para cross-country skiing and Para biathlon)
- Disability class: LW6
Medal record
Representing Canada
| Event | 1st | 2nd | 3rd |
|---|---|---|---|
| Paralympic Games | 2 | 5 | 7 |
| World Championships | 6 | 2 | 4 |
| Total | 8 | 7 | 11 |
Men's Para biathlon
Paralympic Games
| Gold medal – first place | 2018 Pyeongchang | 15km standing |
| Gold medal – first place | 2022 Beijing | 10km standing |
| Silver medal – second place | 2014 Sochi | 7.5km standing |
| Silver medal – second place | 2018 Pyeongchang | 7.5km standing |
| Silver medal – second place | 2022 Beijing | 12.5km standing |
| Silver medal – second place | 2026 Milano Cortina | Individual standing |
| Bronze medal – third place | 2014 Sochi | 12.5km standing |
| Bronze medal – third place | 2018 Pyeongchang | 12.5km standing |
| Bronze medal – third place | 2022 Beijing | 6km standing |
World Championships
| Gold medal – first place | 2013 Solleftea | 7.5km standing |
| Gold medal – first place | 2017 Finsterau | 7.5km standing |
| Gold medal – first place | 2017 Finsterau | 12.5km standing |
| Gold medal – first place | 2023 Östersund | 10km standing |
| Gold medal – first place | 2023 Östersund | 12.5km standing |
| Silver medal – second place | 2017 Finsterau | 15km standing |
| Silver medal – second place | 2023 Östersund | 7.5km standing |
| Bronze medal – third place | 2013 Solleftea | 12.5km standing |
| Bronze medal – third place | 2013 Solleftea | 15km standing |
Men's Para cross-country skiing
Paralympic Games
| Silver medal – second place | 2018 Pyeongchang | 4 x 2.5km mixed relay |
| Bronze medal – third place | 2018 Pyeongchang | 1.5km sprint classic |
| Bronze medal – third place | 2018 Pyeongchang | 10km classic |
| Bronze medal – third place | 2022 Beijing | 4 × 2.5km mixed relay |
| Bronze medal – third place | 2026 Milano Cortina | 10km classic |
World Championships
| Gold medal – first place | 2023 Östersund | 10km freestyle standing |
| Bronze medal – third place | 2017 Finsterau | 10km freestyle standing |
| Bronze medal – third place | 2017 Finsterau | 4 x 2.5km open relay |
- Updated on 11 March 2026

Mark Arendz OPEI (born March 3, 1990) is a Canadian Para biathlete and cross-country skier. He was disabled at the age of seven when his arm got caught in the blades of a grain auger. He is a five-time Paralympian, and is a two-time Paralympic gold medalist.

== Early life ==
Arendz was born on 3 March 1990 in Charlottetown, Prince Edward Island. At the age of seven, he lost his left arm when he lost his balance putting corn into a grain auger. His arm up to his shoulder was caught in the blades and later amputated in Halifax. After the accident, he worked as a junior counselor for the War Amps organization. He also went to Nicaragua with the non-profit organization SchoolBOX to help build a school for the community who had to move.

== Career ==
At his first Paralympics in Vancouver 2010, Arendz participated in six races but did not medal.

During the 2014 Winter Paralympics, he received silver and bronze medals for the 7.5 kilometres standing and the 12.5 kilometres standing respectively. Arendz entered the 7.5 km standing biathlon as the defending champion. He came second in the event, seven tenths of a second behind gold medalist Vladislav Lekomtcev of Russia. Azat Karachurin, also from Russia, took bronze in the event. The weather conditions were not good as it rained with heavy fog for the 12.5 kilometre race. Arendz finished the race in 30:24:6 while the defending world champion Azat Karachurin of Russia took gold again. Arendz became the first Canadian to win two biathlon medals at the Winter Paralympics. After the games, his former ski club, Brookvale Nordic Ski Centre, renamed a ski trail in Brookvale, P.E.I after him, boasting this is where he trained. Arendz hopes the new ski trail will encourage more people to give biathlon and cross country skiing a try.

At the 2018 Winter Paralympics in Pyeongchang, South Korea Arendz won a Canadian single Games record 6 medals, 5 individual and a team relay medal, including biathlon gold, silver and bronze and his first cross-country medals, and was honoured as Canada's flag-bearer for the Games closing ceremony.

He won the bronze medal in the men's 6 kilometres standing event at the 2022 Winter Paralympics held in Beijing, China.

At the 2026 Winter Paralympics, Arendz won silver in the para biathlon and bronze in the 10 km interval start standing classic.
