= Germany at the 2018 Winter Paralympics =

- IPC code: GER
- NPC: National Paralympic Committee Germany
- Website: www.dbs-npc.de (in German)

in Pyeongchang
- Competitors: 20 in 4 sports
- Flag bearers: Andrea Eskau (opening); Clara Klug (closing)
- Medals Ranked 5th: Gold 7 Silver 8 Bronze 4 Total 19

Winter Paralympics appearances (overview)
- 1976; 1980; 1984; 1988; 1992; 1994; 1998; 2002; 2006; 2010; 2014; 2018; 2022; 2026

Germany is scheduled to compete at the 2018 Winter Paralympics in Pyeongchang, South Korea.

== Medalists ==
Medals by sport
Sport	1st place, gold medalist(s)	2nd place, silver medalist(s)	3rd place, bronze medalist(s)	Total
Alpine skiing	5	4	1	10
Biathlon	3	0	2	5
Cross-country skiing	0	3	1	4
Total	7	8	4	19

Medals by date
Day	Date	1st place, gold medalist(s)	2nd place, silver medalist(s)	3rd place, bronze medalist(s)	Total
Day 1	10 March	1	1	0	2
Day 2	11 March	1	2	0	3
Day 3	12 March	0	0	0	0
Day 4	13 March	2	2	1	5
Day 5	14 March	0	2	0	2
Day 6	15 March	0	0	0	0
Day 7	16 March	2	0	1	3
Day 8	17 March	0	1	0	1
Day 9	18 March	1	0	2	3
Total		7	8	4	19

Medals by gender
Gender	1st place, gold medalist(s)	2nd place, silver medalist(s)	3rd place, bronze medalist(s)	Total
Male	1	0	0	1
Female	6	8	3	17
Mixed	0	0	1	1
Total	7	8	4	19

Multiple medalists
Name	Sport	1st place, gold medalist(s)	2nd place, silver medalist(s)	3rd place, bronze medalist(s)	Total
Anna Schaffelhuber	Alpine skiing	2	1	0	3
Anna-Lena Forster	Alpine skiing	2	0	0	2
Andrea Rothfuss	Alpine skiing	0	4	1	5
Clara Klug; Guide: Martin Härtl	Biathlon	0	0	2	2
Andrea Eskau	Biathlon	2	0	0	2
Andrea Eskau	Cross-country skiing	0	3	1	4
Andrea Eskau	Total	2	3	1	6

Medal	Name	Sport	Event	Date
Gold	Anna Schaffelhuber	Alpine skiing	Women's downhill, sitting	10 March
Gold	Anna Schaffelhuber	Alpine skiing	Women's super-G, sitting	11 March
Gold	Andrea Eskau	Biathlon	Women's 10km, sitting	13 March
Gold	Anna-Lena Forster	Alpine skiing	Women's super combined, sitting	13 March
Gold	Andrea Eskau	Biathlon	Women's 12.5km, sitting	16 March
Gold	Martin Fleig	Biathlon	Men's 15km, sitting	16 March
Gold	Anna-Lena Forster	Alpine skiing	Women's slalom, sitting	18 March
Silver	Andrea Rothfuss	Alpine skiing	Women's downhill, standing	10 March
Silver	Andrea Rothfuss	Alpine skiing	Women's super-G, standing	11 March
Silver	Andrea Eskau	Cross-country skiing	Women's 12km, sitting	11 March
Silver	Andrea Rothfuss	Alpine skiing	Women's super combined, standing	13 March
Silver	Anna Schaffelhuber	Alpine skiing	Women's super combined, sitting	13 March
Silver	Andrea Eskau	Cross-country skiing	Women's 1.1km, sitting	14 March
Silver	Andrea Rothfuss	Alpine skiing	Women's giant slalom, standing	14 March
Silver	Andrea Eskau	Cross-country skiing	Women's 5km, sitting	17 March
Bronze	Clara Klug; Guide: Martin Härtl	Biathlon	Women's 10km, visually impaired	13 March
Bronze	Clara Klug; Guide: Martin Härtl	Biathlon	Women's 12.5km, visually impaired	16 March
Bronze	Andrea Eskau; Steffen Lehmker; Alexander Ehler	Cross-country skiing	4 x 2.5km mixed relay	18 March
Bronze	Andrea Rothfuss	Alpine skiing	Women's slalom, standing	18 March

== Alpine skiing ==
For the super combined event, the first run is the super-G and the second run is the slalom.

Men

Athlete	Class	Event	Run 1		Run 2		Total	
Athlete	Class	Event	Time	Rank	Time	Rank	Time	Rank
Georg Kreiter	LW10-1	Downhill, sitting	—N/a				1:28.23	10
Georg Kreiter	LW10-1	Super-G, sitting	—N/a				DNF	
Georg Kreiter	LW10-1	Super combined, sitting	1:33.50	19	DNF		—N/a	
Georg Kreiter	LW10-1	Giant slalom, sitting	DNF		—N/a			
Thomas Nolte	LW11	Downhill, sitting	—N/a				1:34.27	20
Thomas Nolte	LW11	Super-G, sitting	—N/a				1:35.40	21
Thomas Nolte	LW11	Super combined, sitting	DNF		—N/a			
Thomas Nolte	LW11	Giant slalom, sitting	DNF		—N/a			
Thomas Nolte	LW11	Slalom, sitting	59.20	10	1:10.67	14	2:09.87	14

Women

Athlete	Class	Event	Run 1		Run 2		Total	
Athlete	Class	Event	Time	Rank	Time	Rank	Time	Rank
Anna-Lena Forster	LW12-1	Downhill, sitting	—N/a				DNF	
Anna-Lena Forster	LW12-1	Super-G, sitting	—N/a				1:36.26	4
Anna-Lena Forster	LW12-1	Super combined, sitting	1:32.40	4	55.19	1	2:27.59	1st place, gold medalist(s)
Anna-Lena Forster	LW12-1	Giant slalom, sitting	1:18.19	7	1:13.58	5	2:31.77	6
Anna-Lena Forster	LW12-1	Slalom, sitting	55.36	1	1:00.46	1	1:55.82	1st place, gold medalist(s)
Anna-Maria Rieder	LW9-1	Giant slalom, standing	1:16.79	6	1:14.50	6	2:31.29	6
Anna-Maria Rieder	LW9-1	Slalom, standing	DNF		—N/a			
Noemi Ewa Ristau; Guide: Lucien Gerkau	B2	Downhill, visually impaired	—N/a				1:33.33	4
Noemi Ewa Ristau; Guide: Lucien Gerkau	B2	Super-G, visually impaired	—N/a				1:39.09	7
Noemi Ewa Ristau; Guide: Lucien Gerkau	B2	Super combined, visually impaired	1:35.15	5	58.02	4	2:33.17	5
Noemi Ewa Ristau; Guide: Lucien Gerkau	B2	Giant slalom, visually impaired	1:15.71	4	1:16.22	6	2:31.93	4
Noemi Ewa Ristau; Guide: Lucien Gerkau	B2	Slalom, visually impaired	56.12	4	1:00.09	5	1:56.21	5
Andrea Rothfuss	LW6/8-2	Downhill, standing	—N/a				1:32.53	2nd place, silver medalist(s)
Andrea Rothfuss	LW6/8-2	Super-G, standing	—N/a				1:33.10	2nd place, silver medalist(s)
Andrea Rothfuss	LW6/8-2	Super combined, standing	1:33.03	1	1:00.04	3	2:33.07	2nd place, silver medalist(s)
Andrea Rothfuss	LW6/8-2	Giant slalom, standing	1:13.29	2	1:11.89	3	2:25.18	2nd place, silver medalist(s)
Andrea Rothfuss	LW6/8-2	Slalom, standing	58.53	3	1:01.55	3	2:00.08	3rd place, bronze medalist(s)
Anna Schaffelhuber	LW10-2	Downhill, sitting	—N/a				1:33.26	1st place, gold medalist(s)
Anna Schaffelhuber	LW10-2	Super-G, sitting	—N/a				1:34.76	1st place, gold medalist(s)
Anna Schaffelhuber	LW10-2	Super combined, sitting	1:30.57	1	59.54	3	2:30.11	2nd place, silver medalist(s)
Anna Schaffelhuber	LW10-2	Giant slalom, sitting	1:17.42	6	1:13.55	4	2:30.97	5
Anna Schaffelhuber	LW10-2	Slalom, sitting	59.26	4	1:05.92	4	2:05.18	4

== Biathlon ==
Men

Athlete	Class	Event	Final				
Athlete	Class	Event	Missed shots	Real time	Calculated time	Result	Rank
Alexander Ehler	LW4	7.5km, standing	0+0	19:52.0	19:16.2	19:16.2	5
Martin Fleig	LW11.5	7.5km, sitting	0+1	25:43.0	24:41.3	24:41.3	6
Martin Fleig	LW11.5	12.5km, sitting	0+0+1+0	50:02.8	48:02.7	48:02.7	4
Martin Fleig	LW11.5	15km, sitting	0+0+0+0	52:02.1	49:57.2	49:57.2	1st place, gold medalist(s)
Steffen Lehmker	LW8	7.5km, standing	1+0	21:44.9	20:52.7	20:52.7	10
Steffen Lehmker	LW8	12.5km, standing	1+0+0+1	42:32.5	40:50.4	40:50.4	5
Steffen Lehmker	LW8	15km, standing	0+4+0+2	47:09.6	45:54.7	51:54.7	11
Nico Messinger; Guide: Lutz Peter Klausmann	B2	7.5km, visually impaired	1+0	22:58.0	22:44.2	22:44.2	9
Nico Messinger; Guide: Lutz Peter Klausmann	B2	12.5km, visually impaired	0+2+2+1	DNF			
Nico Messinger; Guide: Lutz Peter Klausmann	B2	15km, visually impaired	0+1+1+2	48:49.5	48:20.2	52:20.2	10

Women

Athlete	Class	Event	Final				
Athlete	Class	Event	Missed shots	Real time	Calculated time	Result	Rank
Andrea Eskau	LW11	6km, sitting	0+0	24:33.1	23:04.7	23:04.7	6
Andrea Eskau	LW11	10km, sitting	0+0+1+0	45:19.8	42:36.6	42:36.6	1st place, gold medalist(s)
Andrea Eskau	LW11	12.5km, sitting	0+0+0+0	52:51.5	49:41.2	49:41.2	1st place, gold medalist(s)
Vivian Hösch; Guide: Florian Schillinger	B1	6km, visually impaired	1+0	24:48.7	21:50.1	21:50.1	7
Clara Klug; Guide: Martin Hartl	B1	6km, visually impaired	0+1	24:32.4	21:35.7	21:35.7	6
Clara Klug; Guide: Martin Hartl	B1	10km, visually impaired	0+0+0+1	47:45.4	42:01.6	42:01.6	3rd place, bronze medalist(s)
Clara Klug; Guide: Martin Hartl	B1	12.5km, visually impaired	0+0+0+0	46:42.2	41:05.9	41:05.9	3rd place, bronze medalist(s)
Anja Wicker	LW10.5	6km, sitting	0+1	27:37.5	24:51.8	24:51.8	9
Anja Wicker	LW10.5	10km, sitting	1+1+0+2	53:26.8	48.06.1	48:06.1	8
Anja Wicker	LW10.5	12.5km, sitting	0+0+3+0	1:01:23.3	55:15.0	58:15.0	9

== Cross-country skiing ==
Men

Athlete	Class	Event	Qualification			Semifinal			Final		
Athlete	Class	Event	Real time	Calculated time	Rank	Real time	Calculated time	Rank	Real time	Calculated time	Rank
Alexander Ehler	LW4	20km free, standing	—N/a						52:20.1	50:45.9	8
Alexander Ehler	LW4	1.5km sprint classical, standing	3:49.24	3:40.07	4	—N/a	4:58.7	3	—N/a	4:21.7	5
Alexander Ehler	LW4	10km classical, standing	—N/a						26:44.6	25:40.4	9
Martin Fleig	LW11.5	7.5km, sitting	—N/a						24:30.4	23:31.6	7
Steffen Lehmker	LW8	20km free, standing	—N/a						51:33.7	49:30.0	6
Nico Messinger; Guide: Lutz Peter Klausmann	B2	1.5km sprint classic, visually impaired	3:48.83	3:46.54	4	—N/a	4:43.0	3	did not advance		

Women

Athlete	Class	Event	Qualification			Semifinal			Final		
Athlete	Class	Event	Real time	Calculated time	Rank	Real time	Calculated time	Rank	Real time	Calculated time	Rank
Andrea Eskau	LW11	12km, sitting	—N/a						41:16.9	38:48.3	2nd place, silver medalist(s)
Andrea Eskau	LW11	1.1km sprint, sitting	3:54.01	3:39.97	4	—N/a	4:27.7	2	—N/a	4:08.8	2nd place, silver medalist(s)
Andrea Eskau	LW11	5km, sitting	—N/a						17:58.2	16:53.5	2nd place, silver medalist(s)
Anja Wicker	LW10.5	1.1km sprint, sitting	4:17.75	3:51.98	11	—N/a	5:12.9	6	did not advance		
Anja Wicker	LW10.5	5km, sitting	—N/a						22:29.0	20:14.1	16

Relay

Athletes	Event	Final	
Athletes	Event	Time	Rank
Andrea Eskau; Steffen Lehmker; Alexander Ehler	4 x 2.5km mixed relay	25:25.3	3rd place, bronze medalist(s)
Martin Fleig; Nico Messinger; Guide: Lutz Peter Klausmann	4 x 2.5km open relay	24:53.5	7

== Wheelchair curling ==
Team	Event	Group stage												Tiebreaker	Semifinal	Final / BM	
Team	Event	Opposition Score	Opposition Score	Opposition Score	Opposition Score	Opposition Score	Opposition Score	Opposition Score	Opposition Score	Opposition Score	Opposition Score	Opposition Score	Rank	Opposition Score	Opposition Score	Opposition Score	Rank
Christiane Putzich; Harry Pavel; Martin Schlitt; Heike Melchior; Wolf Meissner	Mixed	(International Paralympic Committee) NPA; W 9–4	(United States) USA; W 6–4	(China) CHN; L 3–7	(Slovakia) SVK; W 7–6	(South Korea) KOR; W 4–3	(Sweden) SWE; L 5–9	(Norway) NOR; L 6–8	(United Kingdom) GBR; L 3–8	(Switzerland) SUI; L 4–9	(Canada) CAN; L 2–6	(Finland) FIN; L 8–4	8	did not advance			

Round-robin standings

Pos	Team	Pld	W	L	PF	PA	PD	PCT	Ends Won	Ends Lost	Blank Ends	Stolen Ends	Shot %	Qualification
1	South Korea	11	9	2	65	51	14	0.818	38	36	9	11	66%	Advance to playoffs
2	Canada	11	9	2	74	45	29	0.818	47	28	6	27	62%	Advance to playoffs
3	China	11	9	2	85	42	43	0.818	43	32	2	16	67%	Advance to playoffs
4	Norway	11	7	4	55	57	−2	0.636	41	35	5	15	58%	Advance to playoffs
5	Neutral Paralympic Athletes	11	5	6	61	63	−2	0.455	44	37	2	23	62%	
6	Switzerland	11	5	6	56	63	−7	0.455	36	45	2	11	61%	
7	Great Britain	11	5	6	57	53	4	0.455	41	41	6	20	62%	
8	Germany	11	5	6	57	68	−11	0.455	37	39	5	16	54%	
9	Slovakia	11	4	7	62	72	−10	0.364	39	46	1	11	57%	
10	Sweden	11	4	7	47	66	−19	0.364	29	45	8	8	57%	
11	Finland	11	2	9	53	87	−34	0.182	35	46	1	11	51%	
12	United States	11	2	9	58	63	−5	0.182	37	45	3	12	60%	

Source: Paralympic.org

Round-robin

Germany has a bye in draws 2, 4, 6, 9, 14 and 16.

Draw 1

10 March 2018, 14:35

Sheet D	1	2	3	4	5	6	7	8	Final
Germany (Putzich) 🔨	0	2	0	1	0	0	3	3	9
Neutral Paralympic Athletes (Kurokhtin)	1	0	1	0	1	1	0	0	4

Draw 3

11 March 2018, 9:35

Sheet B	1	2	3	4	5	6	7	8	Final
United States (Black) 🔨	0	3	0	0	0	0	0	X	4
Germany (Putzich)	0	0	2	2	1	1	0	X	6

Draw 5

11 March 2018, 19:35

Sheet C	1	2	3	4	5	6	7	8	Final
China (Wang) 🔨	2	0	0	0	4	1	0	X	7
Germany (Putzich)	0	0	1	1	0	0	1	X	3

Draw 7

12 March 2018, 14:35

Sheet A	1	2	3	4	5	6	7	8	Final
Germany (Putzich)	3	0	1	0	2	0	1	0	7
Slovakia (Ďuriš) 🔨	0	2	0	2	0	1	0	1	6

Draw 8

12 March 2018, 19:35

Sheet D	1	2	3	4	5	6	7	8	Final
South Korea (Seo)	0	0	0	0	2	0	0	1	3
Germany (Putzich) 🔨	1	0	1	1	0	0	1	0	4

Draw 10

13 March 2018, 14:35

Sheet C	1	2	3	4	5	6	7	8	Final
Sweden (Petersson Dahl) 🔨	1	3	2	2	0	0	1	0	9
Germany (Putzich)	0	0	0	0	3	1	1	0	5

Draw 11

13 March 2018, 19:35

Sheet D	1	2	3	4	5	6	7	8	Final
Germany (Putzich)	2	0	2	2	0	0	0	0	6
Norway (Stordahl) 🔨	0	2	0	0	2	1	1	2	8

Draw 12

14 March 2018, 9:35

Sheet B	1	2	3	4	5	6	7	8	Final
Germany (Putzich) 🔨	1	0	1	0	1	0	0	X	3
Great Britain (Neilson)	0	1	0	2	0	3	2	X	8

Draw 13

14 March 2018, 14:35

Sheet C	1	2	3	4	5	6	7	8	Final
Germany (Putzich) 🔨	0	1	0	0	3	0	X	X	4
Switzerland (Wagner)	1	0	4	2	0	2	X	X	9

Draw 15

15 March 2018, 9:35

Sheet A	1	2	3	4	5	6	7	8	Final
Canada (Ideson) 🔨	0	0	3	1	0	1	1	X	6
Germany (Putzich)	1	0	0	0	1	0	0	X	2

Draw 17

15 March 2018, 19:35

Sheet B	1	2	3	4	5	6	7	8	Final
Finland (S. Karjalainen) 🔨	2	0	0	0	2	0	0	X	4
Germany (Putzich)	0	1	1	1	0	3	2	X	8
