= Brian McKeever =

Canadian cross-country skier and biathlete

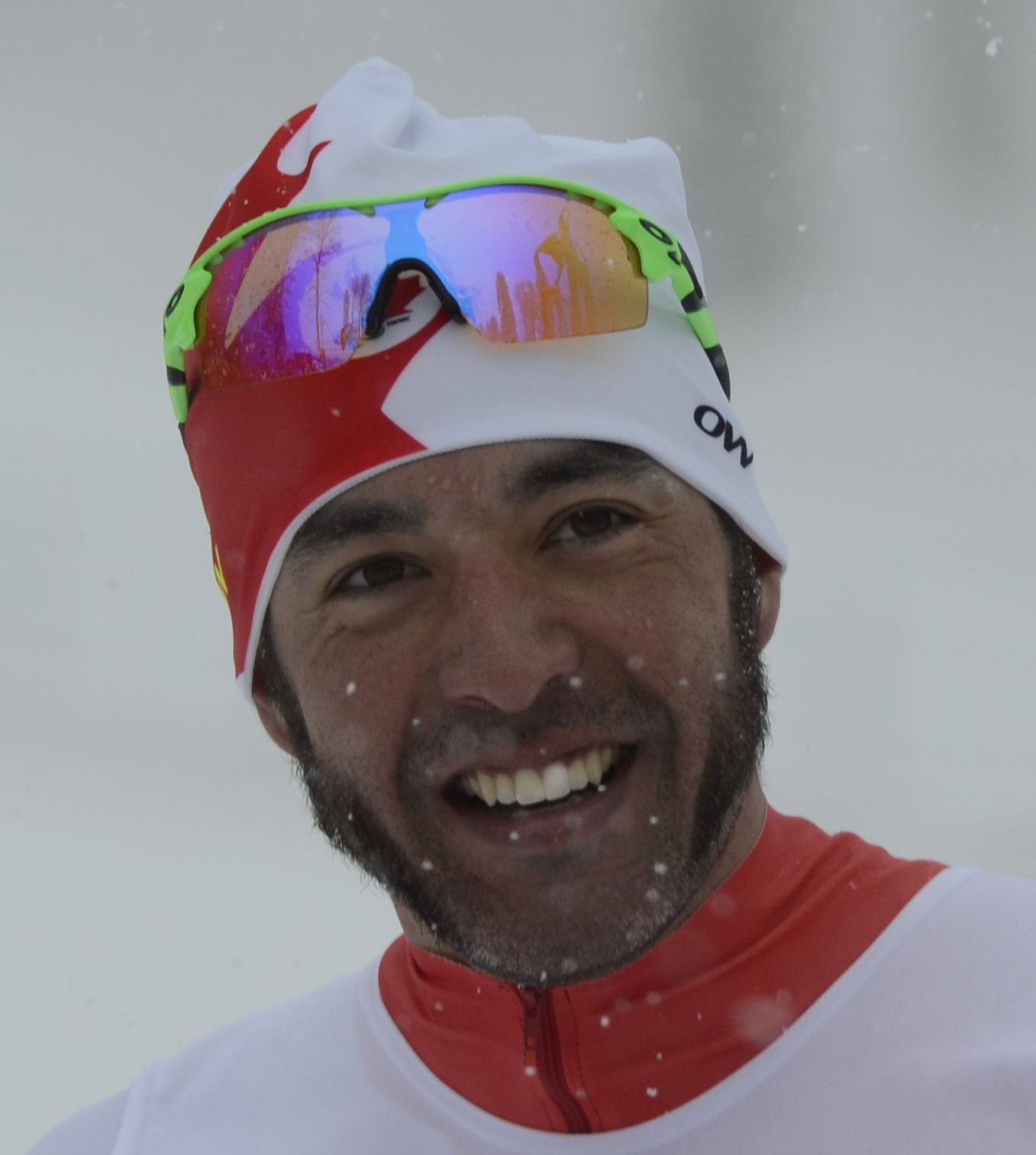
- McKeever in 2014

Personal information
- Born: June 18, 1979 (age 47) Calgary, Alberta, Canada

Sport
- Country: Canada
- Sport: Cross-country skiing and biathlon
- Disability class: B3
- Partner: Graham Nishikawa
- Former partner(s): Robin McKeever; Erik Carleton
- Coached by: Robin McKeever
Medal record
Event	1st	2nd	3rd
Winter Paralympics	16	2	2
World Championships	19	3	1
Total	35	5	3
Representing Canada
Paralympic cross-country skiing
Winter Paralympic Games
Gold medal – first place	2002 Salt Lake City	5km Classical Visually Impaired
Gold medal – first place	2002 Salt Lake City	10km Freestyle Visually Impaired
Gold medal – first place	2006 Torino	5km Freestyle Visually Impaired
Gold medal – first place	2006 Torino	10km Classical Visually Impaired
Gold medal – first place	2010 Vancouver	1km Sprint Visually Impaired
Gold medal – first place	2010 Vancouver	10km Classical Visually Impaired
Gold medal – first place	2010 Vancouver	20km Freestyle Visually Impaired
Gold medal – first place	2014 Sochi	1km Sprint Classical Visually Impaired
Gold medal – first place	2014 Sochi	10km Freestyle Visually Impaired
Gold medal – first place	2014 Sochi	20km Freestyle Visually Impaired
Gold medal – first place	2018 Pyeongchang	20km Freestyle Visually Impaired
Gold medal – first place	2018 Pyeongchang	1.5km Sprint Classical Visually Impaired
Gold medal – first place	2018 Pyeongchang	10km Classical Visually Impaired
Gold medal – first place	2022 Beijing	20km classical visually impaired
Gold medal – first place	2022 Beijing	1.5km sprint visually impaired
Gold medal – first place	2022 Beijing	12.5km freestyle visually impaired
Silver medal – second place	2002 Salt Lake City	20km Freestyle Visually Impaired
Silver medal – second place	2006 Torino	20km Classical Visually Impaired
Bronze medal – third place	2018 Pyeongchang	4 x 2.5km Open Relay
IPC Biathlon and Cross-Country Skiing World Championships
Gold medal – first place	2003 Baiersbronn	5km Visually Impaired
Gold medal – first place	2003 Baiersbronn	10km Visually Impaired
Gold medal – first place	2003 Baiersbronn	20km Visually Impaired
Gold medal – first place	2005 Fort Kent	5km Visually Impaired
Gold medal – first place	2005 Fort Kent	10km Visually Impaired
Gold medal – first place	2005 Fort Kent	20km Visually Impaired
Gold medal – first place	2009 Vuokatti	10km Freestyle B1-3
Gold medal – first place	2009 Vuokatti	20km Classic Style B1-3
Gold medal – first place	2011 Khanty-Mansiysk	1km Sprint Freestyle Visually Impaired
Gold medal – first place	2011 Khanty-Mansiysk	10km Freestyle Visually Impaired
Gold medal – first place	2011 Khanty-Mansiysk	20km Classic Style Visually Impaired
Gold medal – first place	2013 Solleftea	1km Sprint Classic Style Visually Impaired
Gold medal – first place	2013 Solleftea	20km Freestyle Visually Impaired
Gold medal – first place	2015 Cable	20km Freestyle Visually Impaired
Gold medal – first place	2017 Finsterau	10km Freestyle Visually Impaired
Gold medal – first place	2017 Finsterau	20km Classic Style Visually Impaired
Silver medal – second place	2009 Vuokatti	1km Sprint Visually Impaired
Bronze medal – third place	2017 Finsterau	4 x 2.5km Open Relay
Biathlon
Winter Paralympic Games
Bronze medal – third place	2006 Torino	7.5km Visually Impaired Biathlon
IPC Biathlon and Cross-Country Skiing World Championships
Gold medal – first place	2003 Baiersbronn	7.5km Visually Impaired
Gold medal – first place	2003 Baiersbronn	12.5km Visually Impaired
Gold medal – first place	2005 Fort Kent	7.5km Visually Impaired
Silver medal – second place	2009 Vuokatti	12.5km Visually Impaired
Silver medal – second place	2011 Khanty-Mansiysk	12.5km Visually Impaired

Brian McKeever (born June 18, 1979) is a Canadian cross-country skier and biathlete, who became Canada's most decorated Winter Paralympian when he won his 14th medal at the 2018 Winter Paralympics. He finished the 2018 Games with a career total of 13 gold medals and 17 medals, making him the most decorated Paralympic cross-country skier ever. McKeever claimed a 16th Paralympic gold medal in the men's para cross-country middle distance vision impaired race at Beijing 2022, drawing him level with the German para-alpine racer Gerd Schönfelder for the most men's Winter Paralympic wins.

In February 2022 McKeever's life and skiing achievements (with his brother Robin) were celebrated in Toyota's Super Bowl ad "Brothers", part of a global ad campaign titled "Start Your Impossible."

== Biography ==
McKeever began skiing at the age of three and started competing at thirteen. At 19 he began losing his vision due to Stargardt's disease. At the 2002 and 2006 Winter Paralympics he competed in both cross-country skiing and biathlon. He won two gold medals and a silver in cross-country the first year and bronze medal for biathlon plus two gold medals and a silver for cross-country skiing in the later year. For his performance at the 2006 Games McKeever was named Best Male at the Paralympic Sport Awards.

Brian (right) and Robin McKeever after receiving their gold medals at the 2010 Winter Paralympics.

McKeever's older brother, Robin McKeever, competed as his guide in the Paralympics until 2014, when Erik Carleton took over.

In 2010, he became the first Canadian athlete to be named to both Paralympic and Olympic teams. At the 2010 Winter Olympics, he was going to compete in the men's 50km cross-country race, however Canada's coach instead selected a higher-ranked skier who did well at an earlier event at the 2010 games (ending up that skier didn't medal), and so McKeever missed out on becoming the first athlete in the world to compete in the Winter Paralympics and Winter Olympics in the same year.

At the 2010 Paralympics McKeever won three gold medals for cross-country skiing.

McKeever repeated this triple gold medal performance at the 2014 Winter Paralympics in Sochi, sweeping the men's visually impaired cross country skiing individual events for the second time.

At the 2018 Winter Paralympics in Pyeongchang, McKeever was Canada's flagbearer during the opening ceremonies. His gold medal in the men's 20-kilometre cross-country ski freestyle event was the 14th of his career, to pass Lana Spreeman as Canada's most decorated Winter Paralympian. McKeever won another two individual gold and a team relay bronze, his third triple gold medal sweep, for a career total of 13 gold medals and 17 medals in all, making him also the most decorated Paralympic cross-country skier ever.

Prior to the 2022 Winter Paralympics in Beijing, McKeever announced that he would retire after the Games. He swept his three individual events for the fourth Paralympics in a row, including the men's visually impaired 20 kilometre classical, 1.5 kilometre sprint, and 12.5 kilometre freestyle—his 16th Paralympic medal and 20th overall.

In February 2022 the brothers' achievements were celebrated in Toyota's Super Bowl ad "Brothers" telling their inspirational life story—a childhood biking the hilly streets of Calgary, learning to ski, being motivated by the hometown 1988 Calgary Winter Olympics to aim for the national ski team, facing Brian's loss of vision as a teenager and ultimately winning 10 Paralympic medals together.

== Awards and honours ==
In 2011, McKeever was inducted alongside his brother Robin into the Canadian Disability Hall of Fame.
