= France at the 2018 Winter Paralympics =

- IPC code: FRA
- NPC: French Paralympic and Sports Committee
- Website: france-paralympique.fr

in PyeongChang, South Korea
- Competitors: 15 in 4 sports
- Flag bearer: Marie Bochet (opening)
- Medals Ranked 4th: Gold 7 Silver 8 Bronze 5 Total 20

Winter Paralympics appearances (overview)
- 1976; 1980; 1984; 1988; 1992; 1994; 1998; 2002; 2006; 2010; 2014; 2018; 2022; 2026

France sent 15 athletes and two guides to the 2018 Winter Paralympics in Pyeongchang, South Korea. They competed in para-alpine skiing, para-Nordic skiing and para-snowboarding. Marie Bochet carried the flag during the Opening Ceremony.

Four people from France competed in para-snowboarding. Five people competed in para-alpine skiing. Six skiers and two guide skiers competed in para-Nordic skiing. They won seven gold medals, eight silver and five bronze including four golds for Bochet and three golds and two silvers for Benjamin Daviet.

== Medalists ==
Medal	Name	Sport	Event	Date
Gold	Marie Bochet	Alpine skiing	Women's downhill, standing	10 March
Gold	Benjamin Daviet	Biathlon	Men's 7.5 km, standing	10 March
Gold	Marie Bochet	Alpine skiing	Women's super-G, standing	11 March
Gold	Benjamin Daviet	Biathlon	Men's 12.5 km, standing	13 March
Gold	Marie Bochet	Alpine skiing	Women's giant slalom, standing	14 March
Gold	Marie Bochet	Alpine skiing	Women's slalom, standing	18 March
Gold	Benjamin Daviet; Anthony Chalençon; Thomas Clarion	Cross-country skiing	4 x 2.5 km open relay	18 March
Silver	Arthur Bauchet	Alpine skiing	Men's downhill, standing	10 March
Silver	Arthur Bauchet	Alpine skiing	Men's super-G, standing	11 March
Silver	Benjamin Daviet	Cross-country skiing	Men's 20 km free, standing	12 March
Silver	Arthur Bauchet	Alpine skiing	Men's super combined, standing	13 March
Silver	Frédéric François	Alpine skiing	Men's super combined, sitting	13 March
Silver	Benjamin Daviet	Biathlon	Men's 15 km, standing	16 March
Silver	Cécile Hernandez	Snowboarding	Women's banked slalom SB-LL1	16 March
Silver	Arthur Bauchet	Alpine skiing	Men's slalom, standing	17 March
Bronze	Frédéric François	Alpine skiing	Men's downhill, sitting	11 March
Bronze	Thomas Clarion; Guide: Antoine Bollet	Cross-country skiing	Men's 20 km free, visually impaired	12 March
Bronze	Cécile Hernandez	Snowboarding	Women's snowboard cross SB-LL1	12 March
Bronze	Anthony Chalençon; Guide: Simon Valverde	Biathlon	Men's 15 km, visually impaired	16 March
Bronze	Frédéric François	Alpine skiing	Men's slalom, sitting	17 March

== Team ==
People from France went to the 2018 Winter Paralympics in para-alpine skiing, para-Nordic skiing and para-snowboarding. People on the team were Benjamin Daviet and Cécile Hernandez. Marie Bochet was chosen to carry the flag during the Opening Ceremony. She was chosen 100 days before the 2018 Games started. The first people were included on the team in September 2017. The list included Thomas Clarion.

"Team France" was represented by the following athletes at the 2018 Games:

Team France
Name	Sport	Gender	Classification	Club	Events	ref
Arthur Bauchet	Para-alpine skiing	Male	LW3	Club des sports d'hiver du Briançonnais		
Marie Bochet	Para-alpine skiing	Female	LW6/8.2	Albertville handisport		
Antoine Bollet	Para-Nordic skiing	Male	Guide skier			
Jordan Broisin	Para-alpine skiing	Male				
Anthony Chalençon	Para-Nordic skiing	Male	B1	Ski club Morzine-Avoriaz		
Benjamin Daviet	Para-Nordic skiing	Male	LW2	Handisport annécien	Biathlon	
Thomas Dubois	Para-Nordic skiing	Male				
Frédéric François	Para-alpine skiing	Male				
Cécile Hernandez	Para-snowboarding	Female	SB-LL1	Les Angles, France Douanes		
Maxime Montaggioni	Para-snowboarding	Male	SB-UL	Anices handisport		
Julien Roulet	Para-snowboarding	Male	SB-UL			
Bastien Sauvage	Para-Nordic skiing	Male	Guide skier			
Yohann Taberlet	Para-alpine skiing	Male		France Douanes		
Simon Valverde	Para-Nordic skiing	Male	Guide skier			

== Para-alpine skiing ==
There were five skiers from France. They were Arthur Bauchet, Marie Bochet, Jordan Broisin, Frederic François and Yohann Taberlet.

== Para-Nordic skiing ==
Benjamin Daviet was at the 2014 Winter Paralympics. He did not win a medal. His best finish was seventh. The first medal he won at a major competition was in 2017 at a race in Finsterau.

Thomas Dubois first represented France at racing at the 2017 World Cup in Ukraine. Before that, he was the French junior champion in biathlon and cross-country skiing. He finished second in biathlon and cross-country skiing at the senior French championships. Dubois became blind when he was an 8-year-old because of a genetic disorder. He needs to ski with a guide skier. Unlike other countries, Fédération française handisport does not give money to guide skiers to help blind skiers with the cost of competing. To get the right to go to and practice for the Winter Paralympics, it cost €21,000. Dubois had to raise money to be able to pay for that. Maubourguet Lions Club helped Dubois get the money for the Winter Paralympics.

== Para-snowboarding ==
There were three snowboarders from France at the 2018 Winter Paralympics. Snowboarders from France went to Pyrénées at the last part of January 2018 to get ready for the 2018 Winter Paralympics. Cécile Hernandez was one of the snowboarders from France. She went to the 2014 Winter Paralympics. It was the first Paralympics for Montaggioni and Roulet. Hernandez and Roulet have arm disabilities. Montaggioni has a problem with her legs. They were coached by Olivier Noiret and Marcos Lorenzo.
