= Benjamin Daviet =

French Para cross-country skier and biathlete (born 1989)

Personal information
- Nationality: French
- Born: 16 June 1989 (age 37) Annecy, France
- Height: 1.70 m (5 ft 7 in)

Sport
- Country: France
- Sport: Para Nordic skiing (Para cross-country skiing and Para biathlon)
- Disability class: LW2
Medal record
Representing France
Paralympic Games
Men's Para biathlon
| Gold medal – first place | 2018 Pyeongchang | 7.5km standing |
| Gold medal – first place | 2018 Pyeongchang | 12.5km standing |
| Gold medal – first place | 2022 Beijing | 12.5km standing |
| Silver medal – second place | 2018 Pyeongchang | 15km standing |
Men's Para cross-country skiing
| Gold medal – first place | 2018 Pyeongchang | 4 x 2.5km open relay |
| Gold medal – first place | 2022 Beijing | 1.5km standing |
| Silver medal – second place | 2018 Pyeongchang | 20km free standing |
| Silver medal – second place | 2022 Beijing | 12.5km free standing |
| Bronze medal – third place | 2014 Sochi | 4 x 2.5km open relay |
| Bronze medal – third place | 2022 Beijing | 4 × 2.5 km relay open |
| Bronze medal – third place | 2026 Milano Cortina | Sprint standing |
World Championships
Men's Para biathlon
| Gold medal – first place | 2017 Finsterau | 15km standing |
| Silver medal – second place | 2015 Cable | 7.5km standing |
| Silver medal – second place | 2017 Finsterau | 12.5km standing |
| Bronze medal – third place | 2015 Cable | 15km standing |
| Bronze medal – third place | 2017 Finsterau | 7.5km standing |
Men's Para cross-country skiing
| Gold medal – first place | 2015 Cable | 4 x 2.5km open relay |
| Gold medal – first place | 2017 Finsterau | 10km freestyle standing |
| Gold medal – first place | 2017 Finsterau | 4 x 2.5km open relay |
| Silver medal – second place | 2015 Cable | 1km sprint classic standing |
| Silver medal – second place | 2015 Cable | 10km freestyle standing |

Benjamin Daviet (born 16 June 1989) is a French male Para cross-country skier and biathlete. He has competed at the Winter Paralympics twice in his career in 2014 and 2018. Daviet claimed the first Paralympic gold medal of his career after winning the men's 7.5km standing biathlon event during the 2018 Winter Paralympics.

== Career ==
Daviet made his Paralympic debut during the 2014 Winter Paralympics and claimed a bronze medal in the cross-country skiing 4 x 2.5 km relay open event.

He won the bronze medal in the men's 10 km standing biathlon event at the 2021 World Para Snow Sports Championships held in Lillehammer, Norway.
