= Yury Holub =

Belarusian cross-country skier and biathlete

Personal information
- Nationality: Belarusian
- Born: April 16, 1996 (age 30) Hlusk, Belarus

Sport
- Country: Belarus
- Sport: Paralympic Nordic skiing (Paralympic biathlon and Paralympic cross-country skiing)
- Disability class: B3
- Partner: Dzmitry Budzilovich (guide)
Medal record
Representing Belarus
Winter Paralympics
Men's Paralympic cross-country skiing
Silver medal – second place	Pyeongchang 2018	20km free visually impaired
Bronze medal – third place	Pyeongchang 2018	10km classical visually impaired
Men's Paralympic biathlon
Gold medal – first place	Pyeongchang 2018	12.5km visually impaired
Silver medal – second place	Pyeongchang 2018	7.5km visually impaired

Yury Holub (born 16 April 1996) is a Belarusian male visually impaired cross-country skier and biathlete. He made his Paralympic debut during the 2018 Winter Paralympics and went onto claim 3 medals so far in his first Paralympic appearance including a gold medal. He claimed his first Paralympic gold medal after winning the men's 12.5km visually impaired biathlon event during the 2018 Winter Paralympics.

He also claimed silver medals in the men's 7.5km visually impaired biathlon event and men's 20km free visually impaired cross-country skiing event as a part of the 2018 Winter Paralympics with the assistance of his sighted guide, Dzmitry Budzilovich.

He won the gold medal in the men's 6 km visually impaired biathlon event at the 2021 World Para Snow Sports Championships held in Lillehammer, Norway. He also won the gold medal in the men's 10 km visually impaired biathlon event. In cross-country skiing, he won the bronze medal in the men's 12.5 km visually impaired event.
