= Oleksandr Kazik =

Ukrainian Para cross-country skier and biathlete (born 1996)

Personal information
- Nationality: Ukrainian
- Born: 22 October 1996 (age 29)

Sport
- Country: Ukraine
- Sport: Para Nordic skiing (Para cross-country skiing and Para biathlon)
- Disability: Visually impaired
- Disability class: NS1
Medal record
Representing Ukraine
Paralympic Games
Men's Para biathlon
Gold medal – first place	2022 Beijing	12.5km visually impaired
Gold medal – first place	2026 Milano Cortina	Sprint visually impaired
Silver medal – second place	2018 Pyeongchang	12.5km visually impaired
Silver medal – second place	2018 Pyeongchang	15km visually impaired
Silver medal – second place	2022 Beijing	6km visually impaired
Silver medal – second place	2026 Milano Cortina	Sprint pursuit visually impaired
Men's Para cross-country skiing
Silver medal – second place	2026 Milano Cortina	20km visually impaired

Oleksandr Kazik (born 22 October 1996) is a Ukrainian male visually impaired Para cross-country skier and biathlete.

== Career ==
He made his Paralympic debut during the 2018 Winter Paralympics representing Ukraine. Oleksandr Kazik claimed his first Paralympic medal after clinching a silver medal in the men's 12.5km visually impaired biathlon event.

He won the bronze medal in the men's 6 km visually impaired biathlon event at the 2021 World Para Snow Sports Championships held in Lillehammer, Norway. He also won the bronze medal in the men's 12.5 km visually impaired biathlon event.

He competed at the 2022 Winter Paralympics, winning a gold medal in the men's 12.5 kilometres and a silver medal in the men's 6 kilometres visually impaired biathlon events.
