= Taras Rad =

Ukrainian Para cross-country skier and biathlete (born 1999)

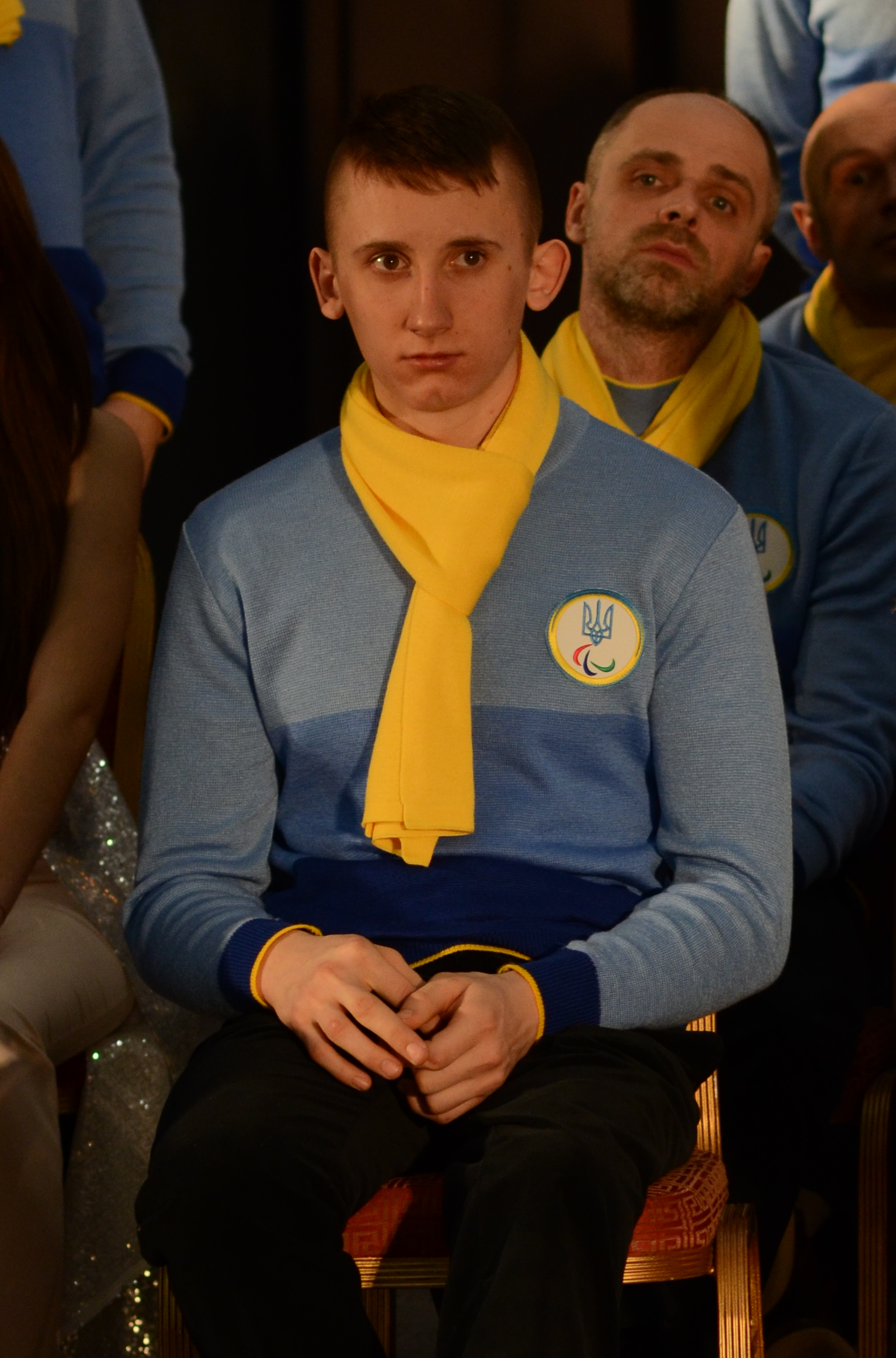
- Rad in 2018

Personal information
- Nationality: Ukrainian
- Born: 20 November 1999 (age 26) Ternopil, Ukraine
- Height: 1.80 m (5 ft 11 in)
- Weight: 64 kg (141 lb)

Sport
- Country: Ukraine
- Sport: Para Nordic skiing (Para cross-country skiing and Para biathlon)
- Disability class: LW12
Medal record
Representing Ukraine
Paralympic Gamess
Men's Para biathlon
Gold medal – first place	2018 Pyeongchang	12.5 km sitting
Gold medal – first place	2026 Milano Cortina	Sprint sitting
Silver medal – second place	2022 Beijing	6 km sitting
Silver medal – second place	2022 Beijing	12.5 km sitting
Silver medal – second place	2026 Milano Cortina	Sprint pursuit sitting
Bronze medal – third place	2022 Beijing	10 km sitting
Bronze medal – third place	2026 Milano Cortina	12.5 km sitting
Men's Para cross-country skiing
Silver medal – second place	2026 Milano Cortina	4 × 2.5 km mixed relay

Taras Rad (born 20 November 1999) is a Ukrainian amputated male Para cross-country skier and biathlete. He made his Paralympic debut at the age of 18 for Ukraine at the 2018 Winter Paralympics competing in Cross-country skiing and Biathlon events. He also went onto claim his first Paralympic medal during the 2018 Winter Paralympics after clinching the gold medal in the men's 12.5km sitting biathlon event.

== Career ==
Taras Rad sustained a leg injury at the age of 14 but was not treated properly by the doctors after receiving the treatment. He was later forced to amputate his leg in order to survive. Taras Rad took the sport of Para Nordic skiing at the age of 14.

He won the bronze medal in the men's 6 kilometres sitting biathlon event at the 2021 World Para Snow Sports Championships held in Lillehammer, Norway. He also won the silver medal in the men's 10 kilometres sitting biathlon event.

In biathlon, he won the silver medal in the men's 6 kilometres sitting event and the bronze medal in the men's 10 kilometres sitting event at the 2022 Winter Paralympics held in Beijing, China.
