= Andy Soule =

American biathlete

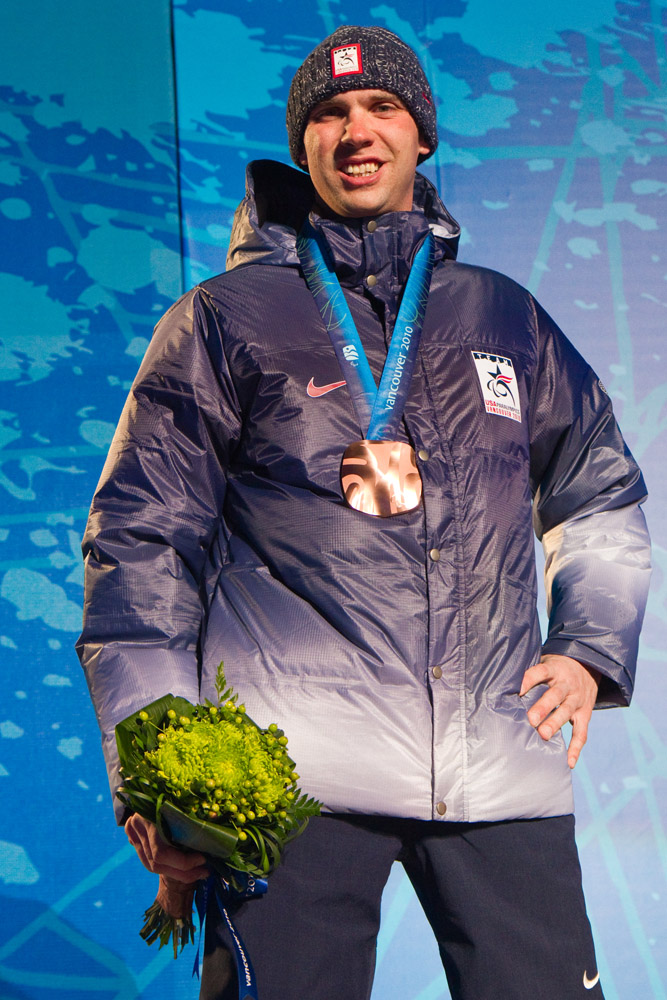
- Soule after winning bronze in biathlon at the 2010 Paralympics

Personal information
- Full name: Andrew Soule
- Nationality: American
- Born: January 2, 1980 (age 46) Torrejon Air Force Base, Spain
- Home town: Kerrville, Texas, U.S.
- Height: 6 ft 0 in (183 cm)

Sport
- Country: United States
- Sport: Nordic skiing
Medal record
Men's biathlon
Representing the United States
Paralympic Games
| Bronze medal – third place | 2010 Vancouver | Pursuit |
| Bronze medal – third place | 2018 Pyeongchang | 12.5 km sitting |

Andrew Soule (born January 2, 1980) is an American Nordic skier and veteran of the United States Army. A double-leg amputee due to injuries received in the War in Afghanistan, Soule uses a sit-ski in competitions.

== Biography and career ==
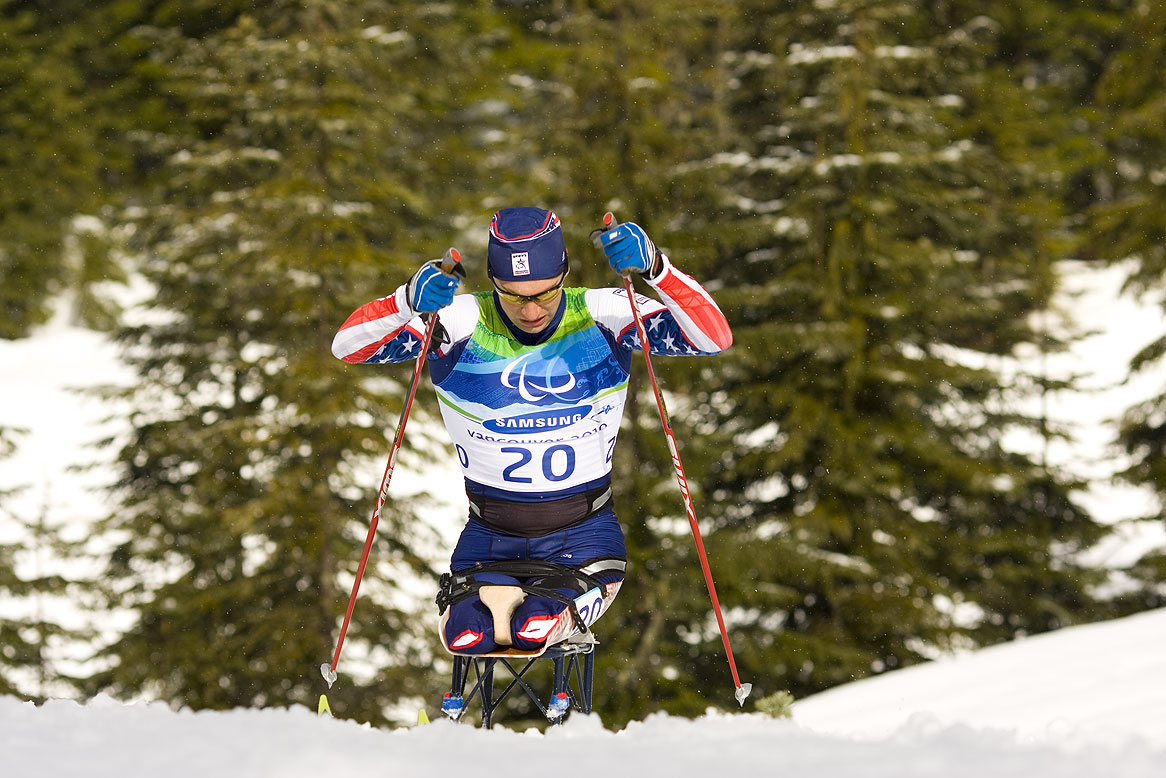
Soule competing in the 2010 Winter Paralympics

A native of Pearland, Texas, Soule attended Texas A&M University as a member of the Corps of Cadets; he was a student there when the September 11 attacks occurred. At the end of that school year, he enlisted in the U.S. Army and, after completing basic training, was deployed to Afghanistan. On May 21, 2005, while on a security patrol in the Shinkay District, his Humvee was struck by an improvised explosive device. The explosion killed one soldier, destroyed Soule's legs, leading to their amputation above the knees, and lightly wounded two other soldiers. Soule was evacuated to Landstuhl Regional Medical Center in Germany and then transported to Fort Sam Houston, Texas, where he spent the next several years recuperating at Brooke Army Medical Center.

During his rehabilitation, Soule took up handcycling in order to stay active. In 2005, he attended a development camp of the Wood River Ability Program, run in conjunction with the U.S. Adaptive Cross Country Ski Team. Despite having scant skiing experience, he excelled at the new sport and only a year later moved to Sun Valley, Idaho, to train full-time. He took second place at the 2007 U.S. Championships and, after being named to the national cross-country ski team, finished the 2008 season 12th in the World Cup standings. Soule represented the U.S. at the 2010 Winter Paralympics in Vancouver, British Columbia, Canada, where he competed in cross-country skiing and the biathlon. He won the bronze medal in men's sitting pursuit on the opening day of the Paralympics, becoming the first American to win a biathlon medal in the either the Olympic or the Paralympic Games.
