= Ukraine at the 2018 Winter Paralympics =

- IPC code: UKR
- NPC: National Sports Committee for the Disabled of Ukraine
- Website: www.paralympic.org.ua

in Pyeongchang County, Gangwon Province, South Korea
- Competitors: 22 (and 9 sighted guides) in 3 (biathlon, skiing and snowboarding) sports
- Flag bearers: Vitaliy Lukyanenko (opening); Taras Rad (closing)
- Medals Ranked 6th: Gold 7 Silver 7 Bronze 8 Total 22

Winter Paralympics appearances (overview)
- 1998; 2002; 2006; 2010; 2014; 2018; 2022; 2026

Other related appearances
- Soviet Union (1988); Unified Team (1992)

Ukraine competed at the 2018 Winter Paralympics in Pyeongchang County, Gangwon Province, South Korea, from 9 to 18 March 2018. The country was represented by 22 athletes, and 9 assistants for athletes with visual impairments. Of the six paralympic sports, Ukraine competed in biathlon, skiing and snowboarding. It won 7 gold, 7 silver and 8 bronze medals.

== Medals ==
Medals by sport

Sport	1st place, gold medalist(s)	2nd place, silver medalist(s)	3rd place, bronze medalist(s)	Total
Biathlon	4	5	5	14
Cross-country skiing	3	2	3	8
Snowboarding	0	0	0	0
Total	7	7	8	22

Medals by date

Day	Date	1st place, gold medalist(s)	2nd place, silver medalist(s)	3rd place, bronze medalist(s)	Total
Day 1	10 March	1	1	3	5
Day 2	11 March	1	0	0	1
Day 3	12 March	1	1	1	3
Day 4	13 March	2	2	2	6
Day 5	14 March	0	0	1	1
Day 6	15 March	0	0	0	0
Day 7	16 March	1	2	0	3
Day 8	17 March	0	1	1	2
Day 9	18 March	1	0	0	1
Total		7	7	8	22

== See also ==
- Ukraine at the 2018 Winter Olympics
