= Alpine skiing at the 2018 Winter Paralympics – Women's slalom =

Women's slalom at the XII Paralympic Winter Games
- Paralympic alpine skiing
- Venue: Jeongseon Alpine Centre, South Korea
- Dates: 18 March 2018
- Competitors: 38 from 16 nations

Women's slalom (visually impaired) at the XII Paralympic Winter Games
- Competitors: 12 from 8 nations

Medalists
1st place, gold medalist(s)		Menna Fitzpatrick; Guide: Jennifer Kehoe	Great Britain
2nd place, silver medalist(s)		Henrieta Farkašová; Guide: Natália Šubrtová	Slovakia
3rd place, bronze medalist(s)		Millie Knight; Guide: Brett Wilde	Great Britain

Women's slalom (standing) at the XII Paralympic Winter Games
- Competitors: 17 from 9 nations

Medalists
1st place, gold medalist(s)		Marie Bochet	France
2nd place, silver medalist(s)		Mollie Jepsen	Canada
3rd place, bronze medalist(s)		Andrea Rothfuss	Germany

Women's slalom (sitting) at the XII Paralympic Winter Games
- Competitors: 9 from 7 nations

Medalists
1st place, gold medalist(s)		Anna-Lena Forster	Germany
2nd place, silver medalist(s)		Momoka Muraoka	Japan
3rd place, bronze medalist(s)		Heike Eder	Austria

The women's slalom competition of the 2018 Winter Paralympics was held at Jeongseon Alpine Centre, South Korea on 18 March 2018.

== Medal table ==
Rank	Nation	Gold	Silver	Bronze	Total
1	Germany (GER)	1	0	1	2
1	Great Britain (GBR)	1	0	1	2
3	France (FRA)	1	0	0	1
4	Canada (CAN)	0	1	0	1
4	Japan (JPN)	0	1	0	1
4	Slovakia (SVK)	0	1	0	1
7	Austria (AUT)	0	0	1	1
Totals (7 entries)		3	3	3	9

== Visually impaired ==
The first run was started at 09:30, with the second run at 12:30.

Rank	Bib	Name	Country	Run 1	Rank	Run 2	Rank	Total	Diff
1st place, gold medalist(s)	7	Menna Fitzpatrick; Guide: Jennifer Kehoe	Great Britain	54.01	2	57.79	1	1:51.80	
2nd place, silver medalist(s)	6	Henrieta Farkašová; Guide: Natália Šubrtová	Slovakia	53.58	1	58.88	3	1:52.46	+0.66
3rd place, bronze medalist(s)	5	Millie Knight; Guide: Brett Wild	Great Britain	54.28	3	59.11	4	1:53.39	+1.59
4	8	Melissa Perrine; Guide: Christian Geiger	Australia	56.74	5	58.33	2	1:55.07	+3.27
5	3	Noemi Ewa Ristau; Guide: Lucien Gerkau	Germany	56.12	4	1:00.09	5	1:56.21	+4.41
6	9	Kelly Gallagher; Guide: Gary Smith	Great Britain	57.35	6	1:01.22	6	1:58.57	+6.77
7	11	Yang Jae-rim; Guide: Ko Un-so-ri	South Korea	1:00.22	7	1:02.41	7	2:02.63	+10.83
8	4	Eleonor Sana; Guide: Chloé Sana	Belgium	1:01.95	8	1:03.68	9	2:05.63	+13.83
9	10	Staci Mannella; Guide: Sadie De Baun	United States	1:04.33	10	1:02.80	8	2:07.13	+15.33
10	12	Aleksandra Frantseva; Guide: Semen Pliaskin	Neutral Paralympic Athletes	1:02.35	9	1:06.38	10	2:08.73	+16.93
	1	Eva Goluža; Guide: Ana Žigman	Croatia	1:10.27	12	Did not finish			
	2	Danelle Umstead; Guide: Rob Umstead	United States	1:04.50	11	Disqualified			

== Standing ==
The first run was started at 10:00, with the second run at 12:49.

Rank	Bib	Name	Country	Run 1	Rank	Run 2	Rank	Total	Diff
1st place, gold medalist(s)	17	Marie Bochet	France	55.18	1	1:00.28	1	1:55.46	
2nd place, silver medalist(s)	24	Mollie Jepsen	Canada	58.36	2	1:01.23	2	1:59.59	+4.13
3rd place, bronze medalist(s)	16	Andrea Rothfuß	Germany	58.53	3	1:01.55	3	2:00.08	+4.62
4	22	Mariia Papulova	Neutral Paralympic Athletes	58.79	4	1:02.57	4	2:01.36	+5.90
5	18	Petra Smaržová	Slovakia	59.22	5	1:03.96	7	2:03.18	+7.72
6	26	Alana Ramsay	Canada	59.62	6	1:03.94	6	2:03.56	+8.10
7	14	Anna Jochemsen	Netherlands	1:01.05	7	1:02.79	5	2:03.84	+8.38
8	28	Ammi Hondo	Japan	1:05.76	8	1:08.13	8	2:13.89	+18.43
9	27	Anastasiia Khorosheva	Neutral Paralympic Athletes	1:05.80	9	1:09.52	10	2:15.32	+19.86
10	25	Erin Latimer	Canada	1:06.55	10	1:09.06	9	2:15.61	+20.15
11	20	Melanie Schwartz	United States	1:11.72	12	1:13.66	11	2:25.38	+29.92
12	29	Ilma Kazazić	Bosnia and Herzegovina	1:27.05	13	1:23.91	12	2:50.96	+55.50
	13	Frédérique Turgeon	Canada	1:06.74	11	Did not finish			
	15	Stephanie Jallen	United States	Did not finish					
	19	Anna-Maria Rieder	Germany	Did not finish					
	21	Mel Pemble	Canada	Did not finish					
	23	Ally Kunkel	United States	Disqualified					

== Sitting ==
The first run was started at 10:30, with the second run at 13:07.

Rank	Bib	Name	Country	Run 1	Rank	Run 2	Rank	Total	Diff
1st place, gold medalist(s)	33	Anna-Lena Forster	Germany	55.36	1	1:00.46	1	1:55.82	
2nd place, silver medalist(s)	30	Momoka Muraoka	Japan	57.22	2	1:03.97	3	2:01.19	+5.37
3rd place, bronze medalist(s)	35	Heike Eder	Austria	1:01.35	5	1:03.50	2	2:04.85	+9.03
4	36	Anna Schaffelhuber	Germany	59.26	4	1:05.92	4	2:05.18	+9.36
5	31	Laurie Stephens	United States	1:08.89	8	1:06.33	5	2:15.22	+19.40
6	38	Liu Sitong	China	1:14.10	9	1:31.04	6	2:45.14	+49.32
	37	Claudia Lösch	Austria	57.41	3	Did not finish			
	34	Stephani Victor	Switzerland	1:02.53	6	Did not finish			
	32	Linda van Impelen	Netherlands	1:03.92	7	Disqualified			
