= Alpine skiing at the 2018 Winter Paralympics – Women's downhill =

Women's downhill at the XII Paralympic Winter Games
- Paralympic alpine skiing
- Venue: Jeongseon Alpine Centre, South Korea
- Dates: 10 March 2018
- Competitors: 27 from 14 nations

Women's downhill (visually impaired) at the XII Paralympic Winter Games
- Competitors: 8 from 7 nations

Medalists
1st place, gold medalist(s)		Henrieta Farkašová; Guide: Natália Šubrtová	Slovakia
2nd place, silver medalist(s)		Millie Knight; Guide: Brett Wild	Great Britain
3rd place, bronze medalist(s)		Eléonor Sana; Guide: Chloe Sana	Belgium

Women's downhill (standing) at the XII Paralympic Winter Games
- Competitors: 12 from 6 nations

Medalists
1st place, gold medalist(s)		Marie Bochet	France
2nd place, silver medalist(s)		Andrea Rothfuß	Germany
3rd place, bronze medalist(s)		Mollie Jepsen	Canada

Women's downhill (sitting) at the XII Paralympic Winter Games
- Competitors: 7 from 6 nations

Medalists
1st place, gold medalist(s)		Anna Schaffelhuber	Germany
2nd place, silver medalist(s)		Momoka Muraoka	Japan
3rd place, bronze medalist(s)		Laurie Stephens	United States

The Women's downhill competition of the 2018 Winter Paralympics was held at Jeongseon Alpine Centre, South Korea. The competition took place on 10 March 2018.

== Visually impaired ==
In the downhill visually impaired, the athlete with a visual impairment has a sighted guide. The two skiers are considered a team, and dual medals are awarded.

The race was started at 09:30.

Rank	Bib	Name	Country	Time	Difference
1st place, gold medalist(s)	2	Henrieta Farkašová; Guide: Natália Šubrtová	Slovakia	1:29.72	–
2nd place, silver medalist(s)	4	Millie Knight; Guide: Brett Wild	Great Britain	1:30.58	+0.86
3rd place, bronze medalist(s)	5	Eléonor Sana; Guide: Chloe Sana	Belgium	1:31.60	+1.88
4	3	Noemi Ewa Ristau; Guide: Lucien Gerkau	Germany	1:33.33	+3.61
5	6	Melissa Perrine; Guide: Christian Geiger	Australia	1:35.40	+5.68
	1	Menna Fitzpatrick; Guide: Jennifer Kehoe	Great Britain	DNF	
	7	Danelle Umstead; Guide: Rob Umstead	United States	DNF	
	8	Anna Pešková; Guide: Michaela Hubačová	Czech Republic	DNF	

== Standing ==
The race was started at 09:47.

Rank	Bib	Name	Country	Time	Difference
1st place, gold medalist(s)	10	Marie Bochet	France	1:30.30	–
2nd place, silver medalist(s)	12	Andrea Rothfuß	Germany	1:32.53	+2.23
3rd place, bronze medalist(s)	9	Mollie Jepsen	Canada	1:34.60	+4.30
4	13	Alana Ramsay	Canada	1:35.21	+4.91
5	15	Maria Papulova	Neutral Paralympic Athletes	1:36.12	+5.82
6	17	Erin Latimer	Canada	1:38.87	+8.57
7	16	Melanie Schwartz	United States	1:39.38	+9.08
8	14	Stephanie Jallen	United States	1:40.64	+10.34
9	19	Mel Pemble	Canada	1:42.22	+11.92
	11	Anna Jochemsen	Netherlands	DNF	
	18	Ally Kunkel	United States	DNF	
	20	Frederique Turgeon	Canada	DNF	

== Sitting ==
The race was started at 10:17.

Rank	Bib	Name	Country	Time	Difference
1st place, gold medalist(s)	21	Anna Schaffelhuber	Germany	1:33.26	–
2nd place, silver medalist(s)	24	Momoka Muraoka	Japan	1:34.75	+1.49
3rd place, bronze medalist(s)	25	Laurie Stephens	United States	1:35.80	+2.54
4	27	Victoria Pendergast	Australia	1:44.14	+10.88
	22	Anna-Lena Forster	Germany	DNF	
	23	Claudia Lösch	Austria	DNF	
	26	Stephani Victor	Switzerland	DNF	

== See also ==
- Alpine skiing at the 2018 Winter Olympics
