= Alpine skiing at the 2018 Winter Paralympics – Women's giant slalom =

Women's giant slalom at the XII Paralympic Winter Games
- Paralympic alpine skiing
- Venue: Jeongseon Alpine Centre, South Korea
- Dates: 14 March 2018
- Competitors: 37 from 17 nations

Women's giant slalom (visually impaired) at the XII Paralympic Winter Games
- Competitors: 12 from 9 nations

Medalists
1st place, gold medalist(s)		Henrieta Farkašová; Guide: Natália Šubrtová	Slovakia
2nd place, silver medalist(s)		Menna Fitzpatrick; Guide: Jennifer Kehoe	Great Britain
3rd place, bronze medalist(s)		Melissa Perrine; Guide: Christian Geiger	Australia

Women's giant slalom (standing) at the XII Paralympic Winter Games
- Competitors: 15 from 8 nations

Medalists
1st place, gold medalist(s)		Marie Bochet	France
2nd place, silver medalist(s)		Andrea Rothfuß	Germany
3rd place, bronze medalist(s)		Mollie Jepsen	Canada

Women's giant slalom (sitting) at the XII Paralympic Winter Games
- Competitors: 10 from 8 nations

Medalists
1st place, gold medalist(s)		Momoka Muraoka	Japan
2nd place, silver medalist(s)		Linda van Impelen	Netherlands
3rd place, bronze medalist(s)		Claudia Lösch	Austria

The Women's giant slalom competition of the 2018 Winter Paralympics was held at Jeongseon Alpine Centre, South Korea. The competition took place on 14 March 2018.

== Medal table ==
Rank	Nation	Gold	Silver	Bronze	Total
1	France (FRA)	1	0	0	1
1	Japan (JPN)	1	0	0	1
1	Slovakia (SVK)	1	0	0	1
4	Germany (GER)	0	1	0	1
4	Great Britain (GBR)	0	1	0	1
4	Netherlands (NED)	0	1	0	1
7	Australia (AUS)	0	0	1	1
7	Austria (AUT)	0	0	1	1
7	Canada (CAN)	0	0	1	1
Totals (9 entries)		3	3	3	9

== Visually impaired ==
In the downhill visually impaired, athlete with a visual impairment have a sighted guide. The two skiers are considered a team, and dual medals are awarded.

The first run was started at 09:30, with the second run at 14:15.

Rank	Bib	Name	Country	Run 1	Rank	Run 2	Rank	Total	Diff
1st place, gold medalist(s)	4	Henrieta Farkašová; Guide: Natália Šubrtová	Slovakia	1:10.83	1	1:12.17	1	2:23.00	
2nd place, silver medalist(s)	10	Menna Fitzpatrick; Guide: Jennifer Kehoe	Great Britain	1:14:45	2	1:13.89	3	2:28.34	+5.34
3rd place, bronze medalist(s)	1	Melissa Perrine; Guide: Christian Geiger	Australia	1:14.95	3	1:13.86	2	2:28.81	+5.81
4	3	Noemi Ewa Ristau; Guide: Lucien Gerkau	Germany	1:15.71	4	1:16.22	6	2:31.93	+8.93
5	8	Kelly Gallagher; Guide: Gary Smith	Great Britain	1:17.33	5	1:15.46	4	2:31.79	+9.79
6	2	Eleonor Sana; Guide: Chloe Sana	Belgium	1:18.02	7	1:15.87	5	2:33.89	+10.89
7	6	Millie Knight; Guide: Brett Wild	Great Britain	1:17.97	6	1:16.55	7	2:34.52	+11.52
8	7	Danelle Umstead; Guide: Rob Unstead	United States	1:19.36	8	1:17.93	9	2:37.29	+14.29
9	9	Yang Jae-rim; Guide: Ko Un-so-ri	South Korea	1:20.81	9	1:17.61	8	2:38.42	+15.42
10	5	Staci Mannella; Guide: Sadie De Baun	United States	1:21.78	10	1:18.23	10	2:40.01	+17.01
11	12	Aleksandra Frantseva; Guide: Semen Pliaskin	Neutral Paralympic Athletes	1:26.89	11	1:23.44	11	2:50.33	+27.33
12	11	Eva Goluža; Guide: Ana Žigman	Croatia	1:28.28	12	1:29.85	12	2:58.13	+35.13

== Standing ==
Standing run 1 results Standing full results

Rank	Bib	Name	Country	Run 1	Rank	Run 2	Rank	Total	Difference
1st place, gold medalist(s)	13	Marie Bochet	France	1:12.04	1	1:10.88	1	2:22.92	
2nd place, silver medalist(s)	15	Andrea Rothfuß	Germany	1:13.29	2	1:11.89	3	2:25.18	+2.26
3rd place, bronze medalist(s)	19	Mollie Jepsen	Canada	1:14.44	3	1:11.28	2	2:25.72	+2.80
4	16	Alana Ramsay	Canada	1:15.78	4	1:13.48	4	2:29.26	+6.34
5	18	Petra Smaržová	Slovakia	1:16.33	5	1:14.73	7	2:31.06	+8.14
6	21	Anna-Maria Rieder	Germany	1:16.79	6	1:14.50	6	2:31.29	+8.37
7	23	Mariia Papulova	Neutral Paralympic Athletes	1:17.29	7	1:14.47	5	2:31.76	+8.84
8	25	Ally Kunkel	United States	1:17.86	8	1:16.72	9	2:34.58	+11.66
9	20	Frédérique Turgeon	Canada	1:19.42	9	1:17.52	10	2:36.94	+14.02
10	14	Stephanie Jallen	United States	1:21.26	10	1:16.17	8	2:37.43	+14.51
11	22	Mel Pemble	Canada	1:22.45	12	1:18.91	11	2:41.36	+18.44
12	17	Erin Latimer	Canada	1:21.69	11	1:20.42	13	2:42.11	+19.19
13	24	Ammi Hondo	Japan	1:25.12	14	1:20.26	12	2:45.38	+22.46
14	26	Anastasiia Khorosheva	Neutral Paralympic Athletes	1:24.65	13	1:22.87	14	2:47.52	+24.60
15	27	Ilma Kazazić	Bosnia and Herzegovina	1:31.28	15	1:31.77	15	3:03.05	+40.13

== Sitting ==
Sitting run 1 results Sitting full results

Rank	Bib	Name	Country	Run 1	Rank	Run 2	Rank	Total	Difference
1st place, gold medalist(s)	34	Momoka Muraoka	Japan	1:13.47	1	1:13.06	2	2:26.53	
2nd place, silver medalist(s)	30	Linda van Impelen	Netherlands	1:14.87	2	1:14.37	7	2:29.24	+2.71
3rd place, bronze medalist(s)	35	Claudia Lösch	Austria	1:15.83	3	1:13.47	3	2:29.30	+2.77
4	32	Stephani Victor	Switzerland	1:16.55	4	1:13.98	6	2:30.53	+4.00
5	31	Anna Schaffelhuber	Germany	1:17.42	6	1:13.55	4	2:30.97	+4.44
6	29	Anna-Lena Forster	Germany	1:18.19	7	1:13.58	5	2:31.77	+5.24
7	28	Laurie Stephens	United States	1:18.92	8	1:12.93	1	2:31.85	+5.32
8	36	Victoria Pendergast	Australia	1:21.22	9	1:20.15	8	2:41.37	+14.84
9	37	Liu Sitong	China	1:26.75	10	1:20.24	9	2:46.99	+20.46
–	33	Heike Eder	Austria	1:16.62	5	DNF			

== See also ==
- Alpine skiing at the 2018 Winter Olympics
