= Alpine skiing at the 2018 Winter Paralympics – Women's super combined =

Women's super combined at the XII Paralympic Winter Games
- Paralympic alpine skiing
- Venue: Jeongseon Alpine Centre, South Korea
- Dates: 13 March 2018
- Competitors: 33 from 15 nations

Women's super combined (visually impaired) at the XII Paralympic Winter Games
- Competitors: 11 from 8 nations

Medalists
1st place, gold medalist(s)		Henrieta Farkašová; Guide: Natália Šubrtová	Slovakia
2nd place, silver medalist(s)		Menna Fitzpatrick; Guide: Jennifer Kehoe	Great Britain
3rd place, bronze medalist(s)		Melissa Perrine; Guide: Christian Geiger	Australia

Women's super combined (standing) at the XII Paralympic Winter Games
- Competitors: 14 from 8 nations

Medalists
1st place, gold medalist(s)		Mollie Jepsen	Canada
2nd place, silver medalist(s)		Andrea Rothfuß	Germany
3rd place, bronze medalist(s)		Alana Ramsay	Canada

Women's super combined (sitting) at the XII Paralympic Winter Games
- Competitors: 8 from 7 nations

Medalists
1st place, gold medalist(s)		Anna-Lena Forster	Germany
2nd place, silver medalist(s)		Anna Schaffelhuber	Germany
3rd place, bronze medalist(s)		Momoka Muraoka	Japan

The Women's super combined competition of the 2018 Winter Paralympics was held at Jeongseon Alpine Centre, South Korea. The competition took place on 13 March 2018.

== Medal table ==
Rank	Nation	Gold	Silver	Bronze	Total
1	Germany (GER)	1	2	0	3
2	Canada (CAN)	1	0	1	2
3	Slovakia (SVK)	1	0	0	1
4	Great Britain (GBR)	0	1	0	1
5	Australia (AUS)	0	0	1	1
5	Japan (JPN)	0	0	1	1
Totals (6 entries)		3	3	3	9

== Visually impaired ==
In the downhill visually impaired, the athlete with a visual impairment has a sighted guide. The two skiers are considered a team, and dual medals are awarded.

The super-G was started at 09:30 and the slalom was started at 15:00.

Rank	Bib	Name	Country	Super-G	Rank	Slalom	Rank	Total	Diff
1st place, gold medalist(s)	1	Henrieta Farkašová; Guide: Natália Šubrtová	Slovakia	1:29.84	1	57.88	3	2:27.72	–
2nd place, silver medalist(s)	3	Menna Fitzpatrick; Guide: Jennifer Kehoe	Great Britain	1:31.49	2	57.51	2	2:29.00	+1.28
3rd place, bronze medalist(s)	9	Melissa Perrine; Guide: Christian Geiger	Australia	1:35.50	6	55.32	1	2:30.82	+3.10
4	4	Millie Knight; Guide: Brett Wild	Great Britain	1:33.63	3	58.1	5	2:31.73	+4.01
5	2	Noemi Ewa Ristau; Guide: Lucien Gerkau	Germany	1:35.15	5	58.02	4	2:33.17	+5.45
6	5	Eléonor Sana; Guide: Chloe Sana	Belgium	1:34.39	4	1:01.53	7	2:35.92	+8.20
7	7	Kelly Gallagher; Guide: Gary Smith	Great Britain	1:37.59	7	1:00.49	6	2:38.08	+10.36
8	8	Danelle Umstead; Guide: Rob Umstead	United States	1:37.70	8	1:01.83	8	2:39.53	+11.81
	6	Staci Mannella; Guide: Sadie de Baun	United States	DNF	—N/a				
	10	Yang Jae-rim; Guide: Ko Un-so-ri	South Korea	DNF	—N/a				
	11	Anna Pešková; Guide: Michaela Hubačová	Czech Republic	DNF	—N/a				

== Standing ==
The super-G was started at 10:05 and the slalom was started at 15:22.

Rank	Bib	Name	Country	Super-G	Rank	Slalom	Rank	Total	Difference
1st place, gold medalist(s)	25	Mollie Jepsen	Canada	1:34.00	2	58.70	2	2:32.70	–
2nd place, silver medalist(s)	13	Andrea Rothfuß	Germany	1:33.03	1	1:00.04	3	2:33.07	+0.37
3rd place, bronze medalist(s)	14	Alana Ramsay	Canada	1:34.25	3	1:01.83	6	2:36.08	+3.38
4	19	Maria Papulova	Neutral Paralympic Athletes	1:36.07	4	1:01.15	5	2:37.22	+4.52
5	16	Stephanie Jallen	United States	1:40.40	8	57.35	1	2:37.75	+5.05
6	18	Petra Smaržová	Slovakia	1:41.07	10	1:00.86	4	2:41.93	+9.23
7	17	Erin Latimer	Canada	1:38.65	6	1:04.67	7	2:43.32	+10.62
8	20	Melanie Schwartz	United States	1:39.78	7	1:09.54	10	2:49.32	+16.62
9	23	Mel Pemble	Canada	1:42.90	11	1:07.23	8	2:50.13	+17.43
10	22	Ammi Hondo	Japan	1:46.65	12	1:08.54	9	2:55.19	+22.49
	15	Anna Jochemsen	Netherlands	1:37.47	5	DNF	—N/a		
	24	Ally Kunkel	United States	1:40.68	9	DNF	—N/a		
	12	Marie Bochet	France	DNF	—N/a				
	21	Frederique Turgeon	Canada	DNF	—N/a				

== Sitting ==
The super-G was started at 10:40 and the slalom was started at 15:42.

Rank	Bib	Name	Country	Super-G	Rank	Slalom	Rank	Total	Difference
1st place, gold medalist(s)	29	Anna-Lena Forster	Germany	1:32.40	4	55.19	1	2:27.59	–
2nd place, silver medalist(s)	26	Anna Schaffelhuber	Germany	1:30.57	1	59.54	3	2:30.11	+2.52
3rd place, bronze medalist(s)	27	Momoka Muraoka	Japan	1:30.89	2	59.36	2	2:30.25	+2.66
4	31	Laurie Stephens	United States	1:33.06	5	1:02.68	4	2:35.74	+8.15
	28	Claudia Lösch	Austria	1:32.14	3	DNF	—N/a		
	30	Linda van Impelen	Netherlands	1:39.08	7	DSQ	—N/a		
	33	Stephani Victor	Switzerland	1:33.92	6	DSQ	—N/a		
	32	Victoria Pendergast	Australia	1:44.49	8	DSQ	—N/a		

== See also ==
- Alpine skiing at the 2018 Winter Olympics
