= 2019 World Para Alpine Skiing Championships =

2019 World Para Alpine Skiing World Championships
- Host city: Sella Nevea, Italy; Kranjska Gora, Slovenia
- Nations: 28
- Athletes: 98
- Events: Downhill, giant slalom, slalom, super combined, super-G
- Dates: 21–31 January

The 2019 World Para Alpine Skiing Championships was an international disability sport alpine skiing event held in two cities: Sella Nevea, Italy from 21 to 24 January with slalom and giant slalom and Kranjska Gora, Slovenia from 28 to 31 January with Super-G, downhill and super combined events. The Championship is held biannually by the International Paralympic Committee (IPC).

== Medal summary ==
=== Medal table ===
Rank	Nation	Gold	Silver	Bronze	Total
1	France (FRA)	8	1	1	10
2	Netherlands (NED)	5	1	0	6
3	Italy (ITA)*	4	1	0	5
4	Germany (GER)	3	7	3	13
5	Slovakia (SVK)	3	3	4	10
6	Great Britain (GBR)	2	3	3	8
7	Switzerland (SUI)	2	3	0	5
8	Japan (JPN)	2	1	5	8
9	Australia (AUS)	1	2	2	5
10	Canada (CAN)	0	4	2	6
11	Austria (AUT)	0	2	3	5
12	Norway (NOR)	0	2	2	4
13	United States (USA)	0	0	3	3
14	Poland (POL)	0	0	1	1
Totals (14 entries)		30	30	29	89

=== Men's events ===
Event	Class	Gold	Time	Silver	Time	Bronze	Time
Downhill	Visually impaired	Giacomo Bertagnolli (ITA); Guide: Fabrizio Casal	1:00.28	Josef Lahner (AUT); Guide: Franz Erharter	1:02.10	Jakub Krako (SVK); Guide: Branislav Brozman	1:02.55
Downhill	Sitting	Jeroen Kampschreur (NED)	58.81	Kurt Oatway (CAN)	59.44	Takeshi Suzuki (JPN)	1:00.87
Downhill	Standing	Théo Gmür (SUI)	58.62	Markus Salcher (AUT)	59.28	Arthur Bauchet (FRA)	59.43
Super-G	Visually impaired	Giacomo Bertagnolli (ITA); Guide: Fabrizio Casal	1:02.93	Jakub Krako (SVK); Guide: Branislav Brozman	1:04.39	Miroslav Haraus (SVK); Guide: Maroš Hudik	1:05.82
Super-G	Sitting	Jeroen Kampschreur (NED)	1:01.15	Kurt Oatway (CAN)	1:04.18	Jesper Pedersen (NOR)	1:04.30
Super-G	Standing	Théo Gmür (SUI)	59.23	Arthur Bauchet (FRA)	1:00.52	Markus Salcher (AUT)	1:01.06
Giant slalom	Visually impaired	Marek Kubačka (SVK); Guide: Mária Zatovičová	2:03.64	Giacomo Bertagnolli (ITA); Guide: Fabrizio Casal	2:08.58	Josef Lahner (AUT); Guide: Franz Erharter	2:10.01
Giant slalom	Sitting	Jeroen Kampschreur (NED)	2:10.55	Niels de Langen (NED)	2:12.32	Jesper Pedersen (NOR)	2:12.69
Giant slalom	Standing	Arthur Bauchet (FRA)	2:04.80	Théo Gmür (SUI)	2:05.51	Thomas Walsh (USA)	2:07.33
Slalom	Visually impaired	Giacomo Bertagnolli (ITA); Guide: Fabrizio Casal	1:55.43	Miroslav Haraus (SVK); Guide: Maroš Hudik	1:57.07	Josef Lahner (AUT); Guide: Franz Erharter	1:58.73
Slalom	Sitting	Jeroen Kampschreur (NED)	1:50.98	Jesper Pedersen (NOR)	1:54.80	Igor Sikorski (POL)	1:59.11
Slalom	Standing	Arthur Bauchet (FRA)	1:43.71	Thomas Pfyl (SUI)	1:51.18	Mitchell Gourley (AUS)	1:53.25
Super combined	Visually impaired	Giacomo Bertagnolli (ITA); Guide: Fabrizio Casal	1:46.32	Jakub Krako (SVK); Guide: Branislav Brozman	1:49.88	Miroslav Haraus (SVK); Guide: Maroš Hudik	1:51.03
Super combined	Sitting	Jeroen Kampschreur (NED)	1:46.24	Jesper Pedersen (NOR)	1:48.44	Takeshi Suzuki (JPN)	1:49.44
Super combined	Standing	Arthur Bauchet (FRA)	1:40.68	Thomas Pfyl (SUI)	1:45.75	Thomas Walsh (USA)	1:47.39

=== Women's events ===
Event	Class	Gold	Time	Silver	Time	Bronze	Time
Downhill	Visually impaired	Menna Fitzpatrick (GBR); Guide: Jennifer Kehoe	1:16.07	Kelly Gallagher (GBR); Guide: Gary Smith	1:31.59	Not awarded	
Downhill	Sitting	Anna Schaffelhuber (GER)	1:08.54	Anna-Lena Forster (GER)	1:10.03	Momoka Muraoka (JPN)	1:11.33
Downhill	Standing	Marie Bochet (FRA)	1:05.02	Andrea Rothfuss (GER)	1:10.88	Ammi Hondo (JPN)	1:11.06
Super-G	Visually impaired	Menna Fitzpatrick (GBR); Guide: Jennifer Kehoe	1:12.99	Melissa Perrine (AUS); Guide: Bobbi Kelly	1:14.81	Kelly Gallagher (GBR); Guide: Gary Smith	1:17.38
Super-G	Sitting	Anna Schaffelhuber (GER)	1:10.12	Momoka Muraoka (JPN)	1:11.55	Laurie Stephens (USA)	1:14.06
Super-G	Standing	Marie Bochet (FRA)	1:07.46	Andrea Rothfuss (GER)	1:11.43	Frédérique Turgeon (CAN)	1:11.60
Giant slalom	Visually impaired	Henrieta Farkašová (SVK); Guide: Natália Šubrtová	2:14.58	Melissa Perrine (AUS); Guide: Bobbi Kelly	2:22.77	Menna Fitzpatrick (GBR); Guide: Jennifer Kehoe	2:25.66
Giant slalom	Sitting	Momoka Muraoka (JPN)	2:21.43	Anna Schaffelhuber (GER)	2:23.14	Anna-Lena Forster (GER)	2:34.91
Giant slalom	Standing	Marie Bochet (FRA)	2:03.35	Alana Ramsay (CAN)	2:13.84	Petra Smaržová (SVK)	2:14.08
Slalom	Visually impaired	Henrieta Farkašová (SVK); Guide: Natália Šubrtová	2:08.45	Menna Fitzpatrick (GBR); Guide: Jennifer Kehoe	2:13.53	Melissa Perrine (AUS); Guide: Bobbi Kelly	2:18.05
Slalom	Sitting	Anna-Lena Forster (GER)	2:18.24	Anna Schaffelhuber (GER)	2:21.60	Momoka Muraoka (JPN)	2:26.42
Slalom	Standing	Marie Bochet (FRA)	2:03.35	Frédérique Turgeon (CAN)	2:13.84	Andrea Rothfuss (GER)	2:14.08
Super combined	Visually impaired	Melissa Perrine (AUS); Guide: Bobbi Kelly	2:02.19	Menna Fitzpatrick (GBR); Guide: Jennifer Kehoe	2:03.84	Kelly Gallagher (GBR); Guide: Gary Smith	2:07.43
Super combined	Sitting	Momoka Muraoka (JPN)	2:04.60	Anna Schaffelhuber (GER)	2:05.72	Anna-Lena Forster (GER)	2:05.92
Super combined	Standing	Marie Bochet (FRA)	1:54.70	Andrea Rothfuss (GER)	2:01.36	Frédérique Turgeon (CAN)	2:02.72

== Participating nations ==
28 nations participated.

- Andorra (1)
- Australia (5)
- Austria (10)
- Belgium (1)
- Bosnia and Herzegovina (1)
- Canada (7)
- Chile (1)
- China (6)
- Croatia (1)
- Czech Republic (4)
- France (5)
- Germany (5)
- Great Britain (4)
- Iceland (1)
- Italy (4)
- Japan (7)
- Mexico (1)
- Netherlands (4)
- New Zealand (1)
- Norway (2)
- Poland (2)
- Romania (1)
- Slovakia (6)
- Slovenia (1)
- Spain (1)
- Sweden (1)
- Switzerland (7)
- United States (8)
