= Lahner =

Lahner is a surname. Notable people with the surname include:

- Emile Lahner (1893–1980), Hungarian painter
- Franz Lahner (1893–1966), Austro-Hungarian pilot
- György Lahner (1795–1849), Hungarian army general
- Josef Lahner, Austrian para-alpine skier
- Timothy Lahner (born 1966), South African rower
