= Jennifer Kehoe =

British Army officer and skier

Jennifer Kehoe MBE
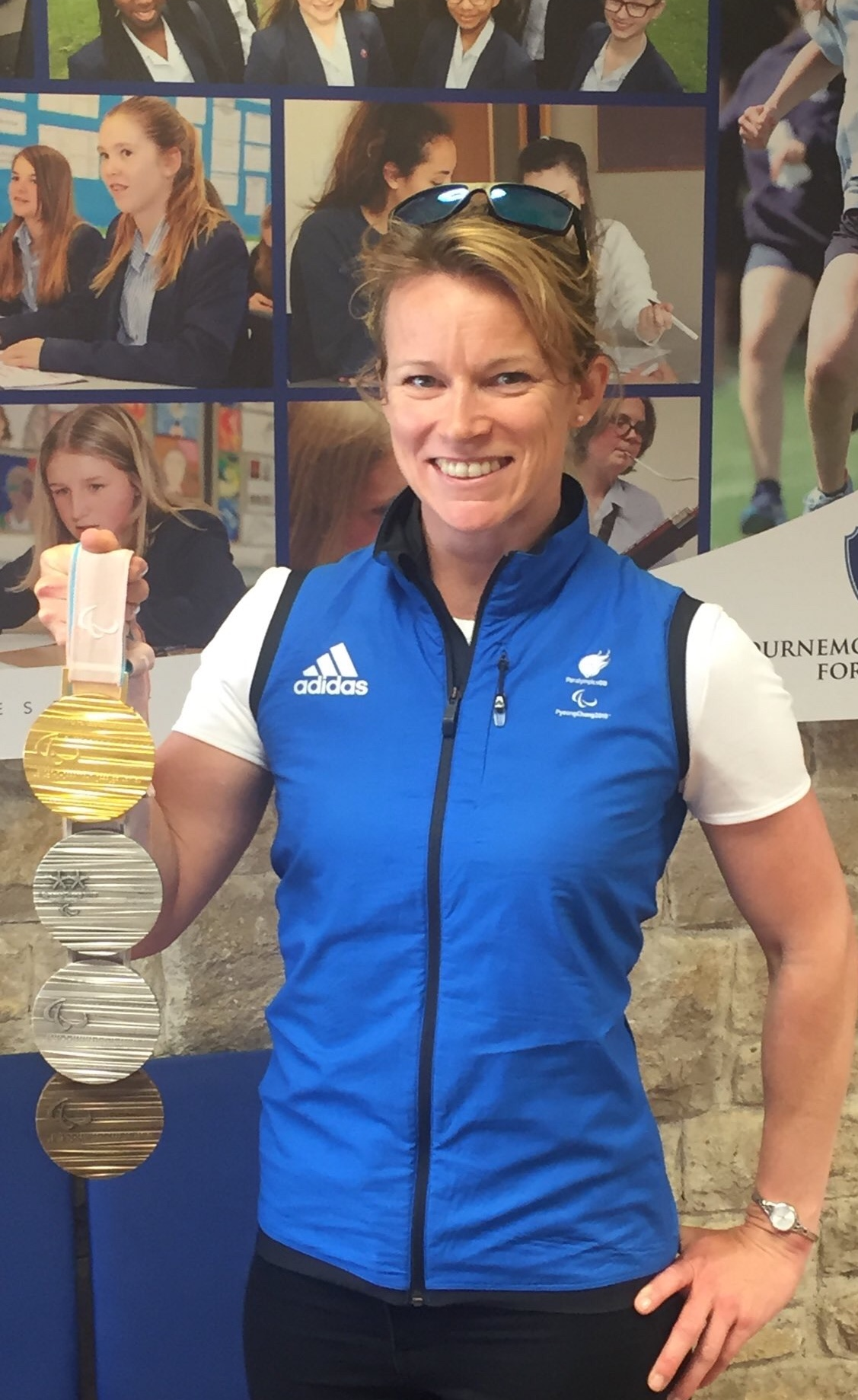

Personal information
- Nationality: British
- Born: 15 November 1983 (age 42) Staffordshire, United Kingdom
- Website: www.mennaandjen.co.uk

Sport
- Sport: Alpine skiing
- Partner: Menna Fitzpatrick
- Coached by: John Clark
Medal record
Representing Great Britain
Alpine skiing
Paralympic Winter Games
| Gold medal – first place | 2018 Pyeongchang | Slalom |
| Silver medal – second place | 2018 Pyeongchang | Super combined |
| Silver medal – second place | 2018 Pyeongchang | Giant slalom |
| Bronze medal – third place | 2018 Pyeongchang | Super-G |
World Para Alpine Skiing Championships
| Gold medal – first place | 2019 Sella Nevea/Kranjska Gora | Downhill |
| Gold medal – first place | 2019 Sella Nevea/Kranjska Gora | Super-G |
| Silver medal – second place | 2019 Sella Nevea/Kranjska Gora | Slalom |
| Silver medal – second place | 2019 Sella Nevea/Kranjska Gora | Combined |
| Bronze medal – third place | 2019 Sella Nevea/Kranjska Gora | Giant slalom |
| Bronze medal – third place | 2017 Tarvisio | Giant slalom |
World Para Alpine Skiing World Cup
| Silver medal – second place | 2017 Pyeongchang | Slalom World Cup |
| Bronze medal – third place | 2017 Pyeongchang | Super-G World Cup |
| Gold medal – first place | 2016 Aspen | Overall World Cup Champions |
| Gold medal – first place | 2016 Aspen | Overall Giant slalom World Cup Champions |
| Silver medal – second place | 2016 Aspen | Super-G World Cup |
| Bronze medal – third place | 2016 Aspen | Downhill World Cup |
| Bronze medal – third place | 2016 Aspen | Slalom World Cup |

Major Jennifer "Jen" Kehoe MBE (born 15 November 1983) is an author and former professional skier, formerly competing with visually impaired athlete Menna Fitzpatrick as her sighted guide on the IPC World Cup circuit and has represented Great Britain winning four medals including gold at the Pyeongchang 2018 Paralympic Games in South Korea becoming Britains most decorated winter Paralympians. She was a British Army Officer.

As well as competing, she worked with wounded veterans and service personnel to support them in their recovery journey as the Performance Manager of the Armed Forces Para-Snowsport Team. It was through Army racing that Jennifer became a para-alpine ski guide. In 2014, she started her guiding career skiing with Paralympian Millie Knight, although a serious injury prevented Kehoe from competing in the Sochi Paralympics. Now skiing with Menna Fitzpatrick, the pair exceeded expectations at the Winter Paralympics in South Korea. They paired up in September 2015, which is proving to be a hugely successful partnership. Along with over 20 Gold and Silver medals to their names, they made history in 2016 by becoming the first ever British athletes to win an overall World Cup crystal globe and be crowned World Cup champions. Kehoe and Fitzpatrick also won the discipline title for giant slalom that season, as well as placing second in the super-G classification and third in the downhill and slalom standings.

Fitzpatrick and Kehoe took a bronze medal in the giant slalom at the 2017 World Para Alpine Skiing Championships in Tarvisio, despite Fitzpatrick suffering a broken hand in a super-G training accident in October 2016 ahead of the 2016-17 season, keeping her off the snow for two months and requiring her to have surgery. The following season the pair took the discipline World Cup title for super-G.

At the 2019 World Para Alpine Skiing Championships Fitzpatrick and Kehoe took five medals, securing bronze in the giant slalom and silver in the slalom before winning gold in the downhill ahead of compatriots Kelly Gallagher and Gary Smith, becoming the first British skiers to win both Paralympic and World Para titles. They then took a second gold in the super-G before rounding off their championships with a second silver in the combined.

Kehoe was appointed Member of the Order of the British Empire in the 2018 Birthday Honours for services to Paralympic Winter Olympic Sport (sic).

On 25 August 2021, she announced the end of her partnership with Fitzpatrick and said her future was within the British army.

== Military service ==
Kehoe underwent officer training at the Royal Military Academy Sandhurst. On 12 December 2009, she was commissioned into the Royal Engineers, British Army, as a lieutenant with seniority in that rank from 16 June 2008. She was promoted to captain on 12 June 2012. After attending staff college, she was promoted to major on 31 July 2019.

== Notable awards 2018 ==
- Member of the Order of the British Empire - Presented by HRH Queen Elizabeth II
- The Sunday Times Sportswoman Of The Year - Disability Sportsperson of the Year (VI Guide to Menna Fitzpatrick MBE)
- British Army Sportswoman of the Year Award
- Woman of the Year Awards - Outstanding Achievement
