= Thomas Walsh (skier) =

American para-alpine skier (born 1995)

Personal information
- Full name: Thomas Charles Walsh
- Born: January 30, 1995 (age 31) Vail, Colorado, U.S.
- Height: 5 ft 4 in (163 cm)

Sport
- Country: United States
- Sport: Para-alpine skiing
- Disability class: LW4
Medal record
Representing United States
Men's para alpine skiing
Paralympic Games
Silver medal – second place	2022 Beijing	Giant slalom, standing
World Para Alpine Skiing Championships
Bronze medal – third place	2019 Sella Nevea/Kranjska Gora	Giant slalom, standing
Bronze medal – third place	2019 Sella Nevea/Kranjska Gora	Super combined, standing

Thomas Charles Walsh (born January 30, 1995) is an American para-alpine skier. Born and raised in Vail, Colorado, he starting skiing at the age of 2. He began his racing career with the Ski and Snowboard Club Vail at the age of 5.

== Career ==
He represented the United States at the 2018 Winter Paralympics in the super-G, giant slalom, slalom, and super combined events. He did not win a medal at these events.

He won bronze medals at the 2019 World Para Alpine Skiing Championships in both the giant slalom and super combined events.

He won a silver medal in alpine skiing at the 2022 Winter Paralympics held in Beijing, China.

== Major Competition Results ==
=== Paralympic Games ===
Year	Place	Downhill	Super-G	Giant Slalom	Slalom	Super Combined
2018	(South Korea) Pyeongchang	9	13	7	5	DNF
2022	(China) Beijing	—	15	2	6	4

=== World Championships ===
Year	Place	Downhill	Super-G	Giant Slalom	Slalom	Combined	Parallel
2017	(Italy) Tarvisio	—	10	DNF	DSQ	19	—
2019	(Slovenia) Kranjska Gora / Sella Nevea	6	5	3	DNS	3	—
2022	(Norway) Lillehammer	11	DNF	6	10	4	14
2023	(Spain) Espot	12	10	11	5	4	—

== World Cup Career Statistics ==
Throughout his World Cup career, Walsh has competed in 106 races, maintaining a high finish efficiency of 81.13% with 86 race finishes. Of those finishes, nearly all have been in the top 15, highlighting 74 top-10 finishes, 53 top-5 finishes, 21 podiums, and 3 victories. He averages a podium finish in roughly 19.81% of all races started.

=== Career Summary ===
Total Starts	Finishes	Top 15	Top 10	Top 5	Podiums	Wins	Finish %	Podium %
106	86	85	74	53	21	3	81.13%	19.81%

=== World Cup Podiums ===
Date	Place	Discipline	Position
14-01-2023	(Switzerland) Veysonnaz	Slalom	2
20-12-2021	(Switzerland) Salastrains	Slalom	3
19-02-2020	(Russia) Juzhno-Sakhalinsk	Giant Slalom	1
21-01-2020	(Slovenia) Kranjska Gora	Giant Slalom	3
20-01-2020	(Slovenia) Kranjska Gora	Giant Slalom	3
16-03-2019	(Spain) La Molina	Slalom	2
11-03-2019	(Spain) La Molina	Giant Slalom	3
17-01-2019	(Croatia) Zagreb	Slalom	2
16-01-2019	(Croatia) Zagreb	Slalom	2
12-01-2018	(Slovenia) Kranjska Gora	Giant Slalom	3
20-12-2017	(Austria) Kuhtai	Giant Slalom	2
19-12-2017	(Austria) Kuhtai	Giant Slalom	2
05-03-2017	(Japan) Hakuba	Giant Slalom	3
20-12-2016	(Switzerland) St Moritz	Giant Slalom	3
19-12-2016	(Switzerland) St Moritz	Giant Slalom	2
17-12-2016	(Austria) Kuhtai	Giant Slalom	2
16-12-2016	(Austria) Kuhtai	Giant Slalom	2
15-12-2016	(Austria) Kuhtai	Slalom	3
24-02-2016	(United States) Aspen Mountain	Giant Slalom	1
22-01-2016	(Switzerland) St Moritz	Slalom	1
15-01-2016	(Slovenia) Kranjska Gora	Giant Slalom	3

=== Full World Cup Results ===
Date	Place	Discipline	Position
17-03-2023	(Italy) Cortina	Slalom	5
16-03-2023	(Italy) Cortina	Giant Slalom	9
15-03-2023	(Italy) Cortina	Giant Slalom	5
12-03-2023	(Italy) Sella Nevea/Tarvisio	Downhill	10
11-03-2023	(Italy) Sella Nevea/Tarvisio	Downhill	4
28-02-2023	(Austria) Kitzbühel	Slalom	DNF
27-02-2023	(Austria) Kitzbühel	Slalom	DNF
11-02-2023	(Austria) Saalbach	Super-G	11
10-02-2023	(Austria) Saalbach	Super-G	10
09-02-2023	(Austria) Saalbach	Downhill	8
08-02-2023	(Austria) Saalbach	Downhill	10
14-01-2023	(Switzerland) Veysonnaz	Slalom	2
12-01-2023	(Switzerland) Veysonnaz	Giant Slalom	4
11-01-2023	(Switzerland) Veysonnaz	Giant Slalom	12
10-01-2023	(Switzerland) Veysonnaz	Giant Slalom	6
15-12-2022	(Austria) Steinach am Brenner	Super-G	14
14-12-2022	(Austria) Steinach am Brenner	Super-G	11
11-12-2022	(Switzerland) Salastrains	Slalom	4
10-12-2022	(Switzerland) Salastrains	Slalom	4
09-12-2022	(Switzerland) Salastrains	Slalom	5
08-12-2022	(Switzerland) Salastrains	Giant Slalom	5
28-01-2022	(Sweden) Åre	Super-G	5
21-12-2021	(Switzerland) Salastrains	Slalom	10
20-12-2021	(Switzerland) Salastrains	Slalom	3
19-12-2021	(Switzerland) Salastrains	Giant Slalom	5
18-12-2021	(Switzerland) Salastrains	Giant Slalom	DNF
17-12-2021	(Switzerland) Salastrains	Giant Slalom	4
21-02-2020	(Russia) Juzhno-Sakhalinsk	Parallel Event	5
20-02-2020	(Russia) Juzhno-Sakhalinsk	Slalom	DNF
19-02-2020	(Russia) Juzhno-Sakhalinsk	Giant Slalom	1
17-02-2020	(Russia) Juzhno-Sakhalinsk	Super-G	6
16-02-2020	(Russia) Juzhno-Sakhalinsk	Super-G	4
14-02-2020	(Russia) Juzhno-Sakhalinsk	Downhill	8
13-02-2020	(Russia) Juzhno-Sakhalinsk	Downhill	7
12-02-2020	(Russia) Juzhno-Sakhalinsk	Downhill	5
23-01-2020	(Slovenia) Kranjska Gora	Slalom	DNF
22-01-2020	(Slovenia) Kranjska Gora	Giant Slalom	DNF
21-01-2020	(Slovenia) Kranjska Gora	Giant Slalom	3
20-01-2020	(Slovenia) Kranjska Gora	Giant Slalom	3
17-01-2020	(Italy) Prato Nevoso	Slalom	DNF
16-01-2020	(Italy) Prato Nevoso	Slalom	7
15-01-2020	(Italy) Prato Nevoso	Slalom	14
12-01-2020	(Switzerland) Veysonnaz	Giant Slalom	4
11-01-2020	(Switzerland) Veysonnaz	Giant Slalom	16
10-01-2020	(Switzerland) Veysonnaz	Super-G	4
09-01-2020	(Switzerland) Veysonnaz	Super-G	7
08-01-2020	(Switzerland) Veysonnaz	Super-G	DSQ
21-03-2019	(France) Morzine	Slalom	4
20-03-2019	(France) Morzine	Slalom	6
16-03-2019	(Spain) La Molina	Slalom	2
15-03-2019	(Spain) La Molina	Slalom	DNF
14-03-2019	(Spain) La Molina	Giant Slalom	DNF
12-03-2019	(Spain) La Molina	Giant Slalom	5
11-03-2019	(Spain) La Molina	Giant Slalom	3
10-02-2019	(Switzerland) Veysonnaz	Giant Slalom	5
09-02-2019	(Switzerland) Veysonnaz	Giant Slalom	5
08-02-2019	(Switzerland) Veysonnaz	Giant Slalom	5
07-02-2019	(Switzerland) Veysonnaz	Super-G	5
06-02-2019	(Switzerland) Veysonnaz	Super-G	5
06-02-2019	(Switzerland) Veysonnaz	Super-G	4
17-01-2019	(Croatia) Zagreb	Slalom	2
16-01-2019	(Croatia) Zagreb	Slalom	2
18-01-2018	(Switzerland) Veysonnaz	Slalom	6
15-01-2018	(Switzerland) Veysonnaz	Giant Slalom	8
12-01-2018	(Slovenia) Kranjska Gora	Giant Slalom	3
11-01-2018	(Slovenia) Kranjska Gora	Giant Slalom	5
09-01-2018	(Croatia) Zagreb-Sljeme	Slalom	DNF
08-01-2018	(Croatia) Zagreb-Sljeme	Slalom	4
22-12-2017	(Austria) Kuhtai	Slalom	DNF
21-12-2017	(Austria) Kuhtai	Slalom	7
20-12-2017	(Austria) Kuhtai	Giant Slalom	2
19-12-2017	(Austria) Kuhtai	Giant Slalom	2
17-03-2017	(South Korea) PyeongChang	Giant Slalom	DNF
15-03-2017	(South Korea) PyeongChang	Super-G	DNF
14-03-2017	(South Korea) PyeongChang	Super-G	11
12-03-2017	(South Korea) PyeongChang	Downhill	9
06-03-2017	(Japan) Hakuba	Super-G	DNF
06-03-2017	(Japan) Hakuba	Super-G	DNF
05-03-2017	(Japan) Hakuba	Giant Slalom	3
20-01-2017	(Slovenia) Kranjska Gora	Slalom	DNF
19-01-2017	(Slovenia) Kranjska Gora	Slalom	12
18-01-2017	(Slovenia) Kranjska Gora	Giant Slalom	7
22-12-2016	(Switzerland) St Moritz	Slalom	DNF
21-12-2016	(Switzerland) St Moritz	Slalom	DSQ
20-12-2016	(Switzerland) St Moritz	Giant Slalom	3
19-12-2016	(Switzerland) St Moritz	Giant Slalom	2
17-12-2016	(Austria) Kuhtai	Giant Slalom	3
16-12-2016	(Austria) Kuhtai	Giant Slalom	2
15-12-2016	(Austria) Kuhtai	Slalom	3
04-03-2016	(United States) Aspen / Buttermilk, CO	Super-G	15
03-03-2016	(United States) Aspen / Buttermilk, CO	Super-G	14
02-03-2016	(United States) Aspen / Buttermilk, CO	Downhill	15
01-03-2016	(United States) Aspen / Buttermilk, CO	Downhill	DNF
26-02-2016	(United States) Aspen Mountain, CO	Slalom	5
25-02-2016	(United States) Aspen Mountain, CO	Giant Slalom	4
24-02-2016	(United States) Aspen Mountain, CO	Giant Slalom	1
23-01-2016	(Switzerland) St Moritz	Slalom	5
22-01-2016	(Switzerland) St Moritz	Slalom	1
19-01-2016	(Italy) Tarvisio	Giant Slalom	5
18-01-2016	(Italy) Tarvisio	Slalom	4
16-01-2016	(Slovenia) Kranjska Gora	Slalom	5
15-01-2016	(Slovenia) Kranjska Gora	Giant Slalom	3

"
