= Mitchell Gourley =

Australian Paralympic alpine skier

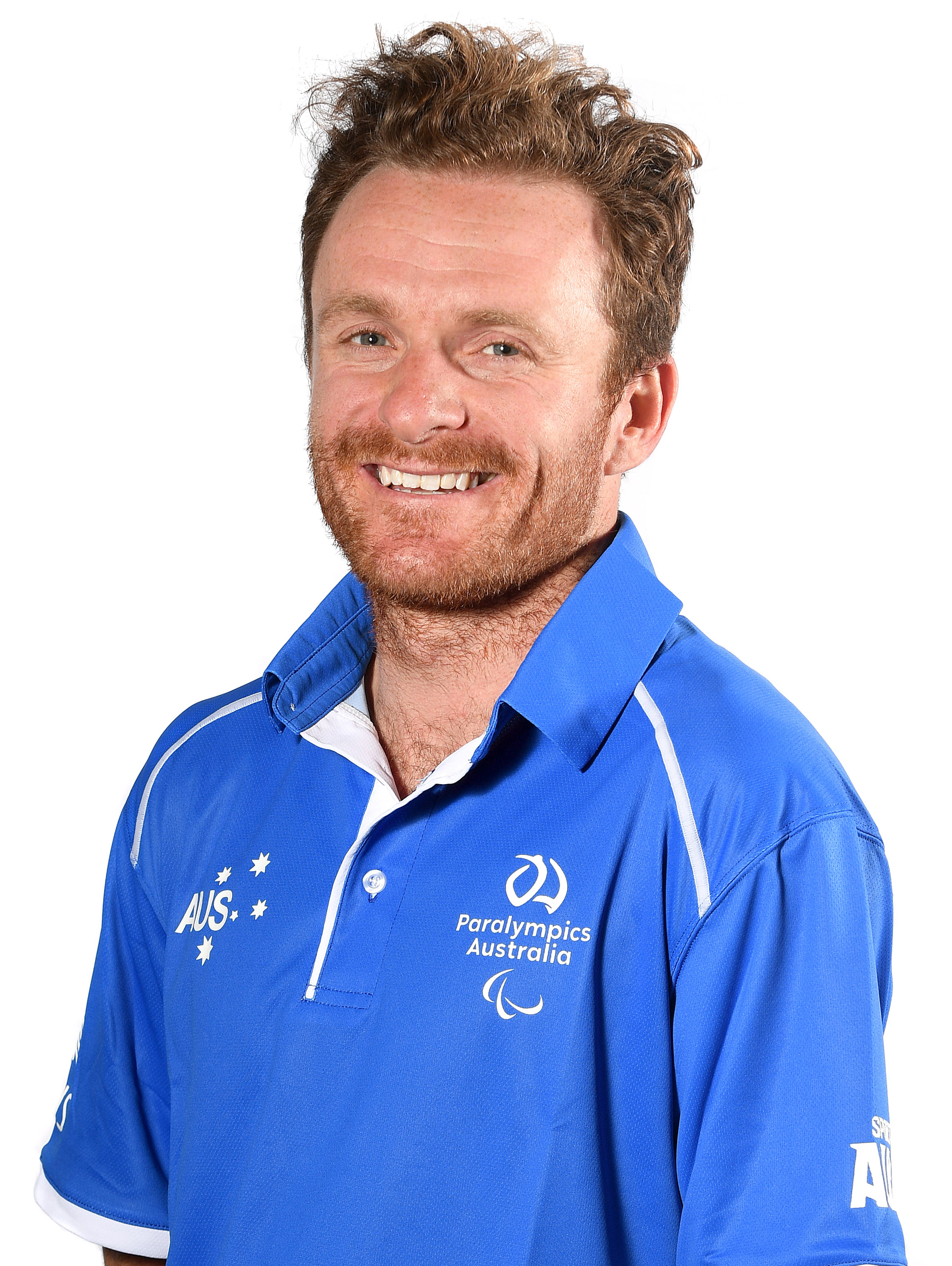
- Mitchell Gourley in April 2021

Personal information
- Born: 2 June 1991 (age 35) Geelong, Victoria

Sport
- Country: Australia
- Sport: Para-alpine skiing
- Disability class: LW6/8
- Events: Downhill, super-G, giant slalom, slalom, super combined

Achievements and titles
- Paralympic finals: 2010 Winter Paralympics, 2014 Winter Paralympics
Medal record
Alpine skiing
IPC Alpine Skiing World Championships
Gold medal – first place	2017 Tarvisio, Italy	Men's Super Combined Standing
Bronze medal – third place	2019 Kranjska Gora, Slovenia	Men's slalom Standing

Mitchell Gourley (born 2 June 1991) is an Australian Paralympic alpine skier who competed for Australia in the downhill, super-G, giant slalom, slalom and super combined events at four Winter Paralympics - 2010 to 2022. He was Australian team co-captain with Joany Badenhorst at the 2018 Winter Paralympics. At the 2022 Winter Paralympics, he and Melissa Perrine carried the Australian flag in the opening ceremony. At the 2017 IPC Alpine Skiing World Championships in Tarvisio, Italy he won the gold medal in the men's Super Combined Standing.

== Personal ==
Mitchell Gourley was born just outside Geelong, Victoria, on 2 June 1991. He was born a congenital amputee, with his left forearm ending a few inches below his elbow. Mitchell can move the tiny stump of his forearm and uses it to hold and manipulate objects by gripping them in his elbow. He plays a variety of sports including cricket, Australian rules football, basketball, road cycling and rock-climbing. He attended at Geelong College. In 2014, he completed a Bachelor of Commerce at the University of Melbourne and in 2019 completed a Master of Business (Sport Management) at Deakin University.

== Skiing ==
Cameron Rahles Rahbula, Mitchell Gourley and Toby Kane interview originally done for Wikinews

Gourley became involved in high level Paralympic skiing as a result of Australian talent identification efforts, taking up the sport competitively in 2002 as an eleven-year-old. He was classified as LW6/8-2, the classification for athletes with an impairment to one arm, and made his Australian national team début in 2006, as a fifteen-year-old. He has held scholarships with the Victorian Institute of Sport and the Australian Institute of Sport.

At the 2009 Norm Cup, Gourley finished first in the men's standing class giant slalom event. In the same year, he competed in the IPC Alpine Skiing Nor Am Cup in Colorado. He was officially named to the Australian 2010 Winter Paralympics team in November 2009. A ceremony was held in Canberra with Australian Paralympic Committee president Greg Hartung and Minister for Sport Kate Ellis making the announcement.

Mitchell Gourley competing in the super-G during the second day of the 2012 IPC Nor Am Cup at Copper Mountain
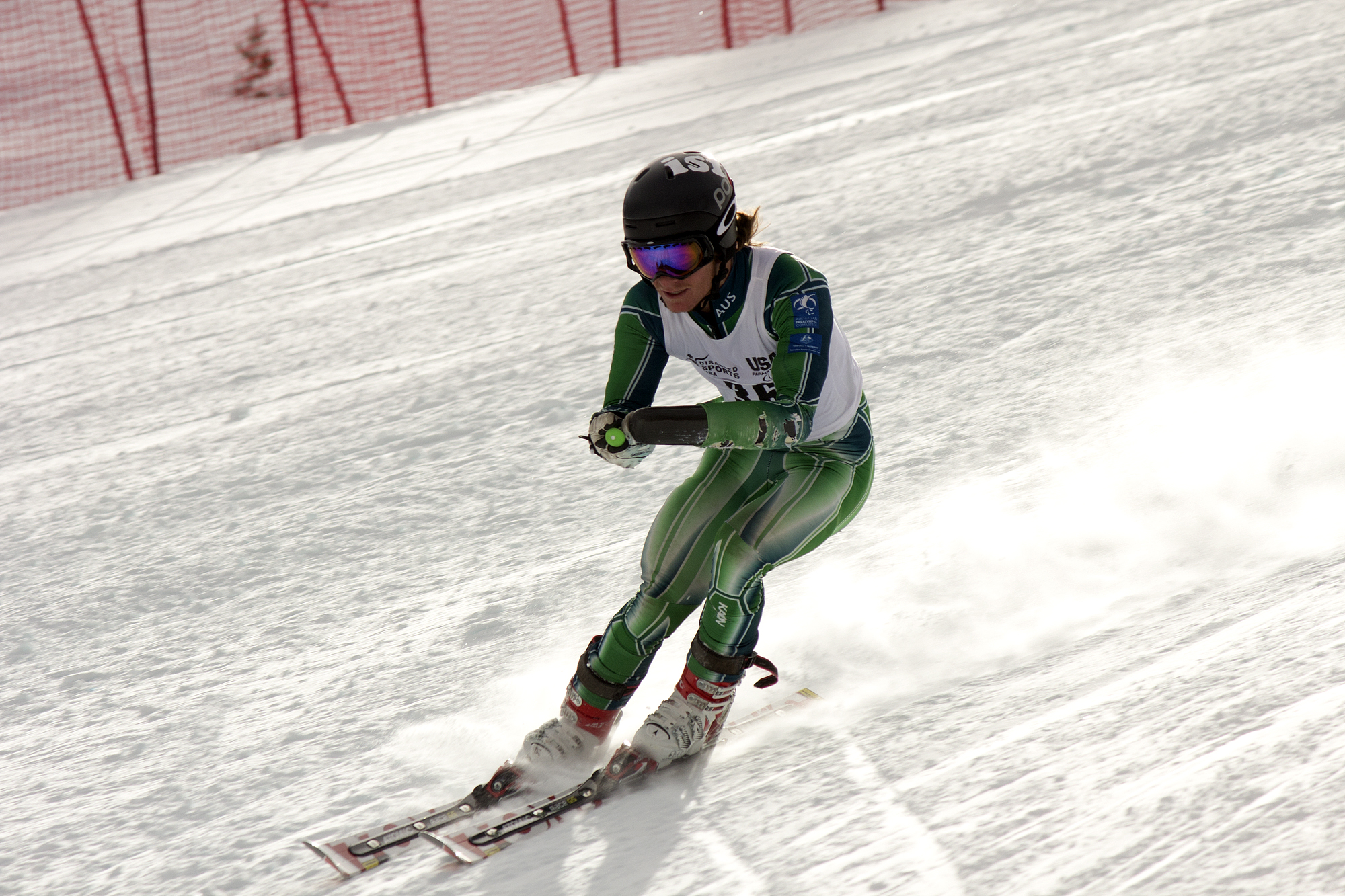

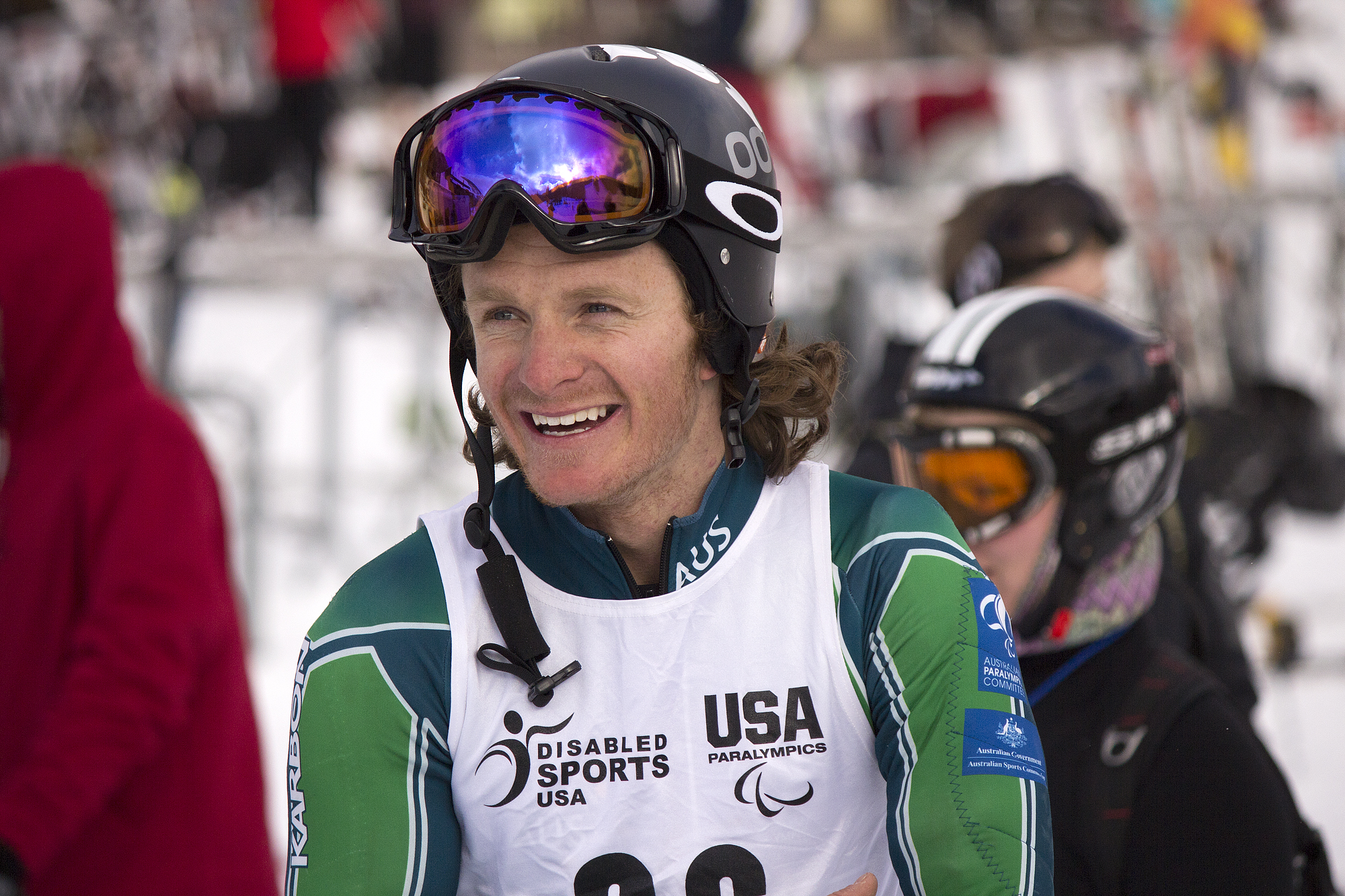

Gourley competed at the 2010 IPC Alpine Skiing World Cup in Italy and World Cup in Austria. Going into the 2010 Winter Paralympic Games, his best ever world ranking was 17th. He attempted to bulk up and put on additional weight by eating six to eight meals a day. He arrived in the Paralympic village with the rest of Australia's Para-alpine team on 9 March 2010. Coached by Steve Graham, he competed in the downhill, super-G, giant slalom, slalom and super combined events. In the super-G standing event, he finished 10th. He also finished 27th in the slalom. He came 30th in the giant slalom event.

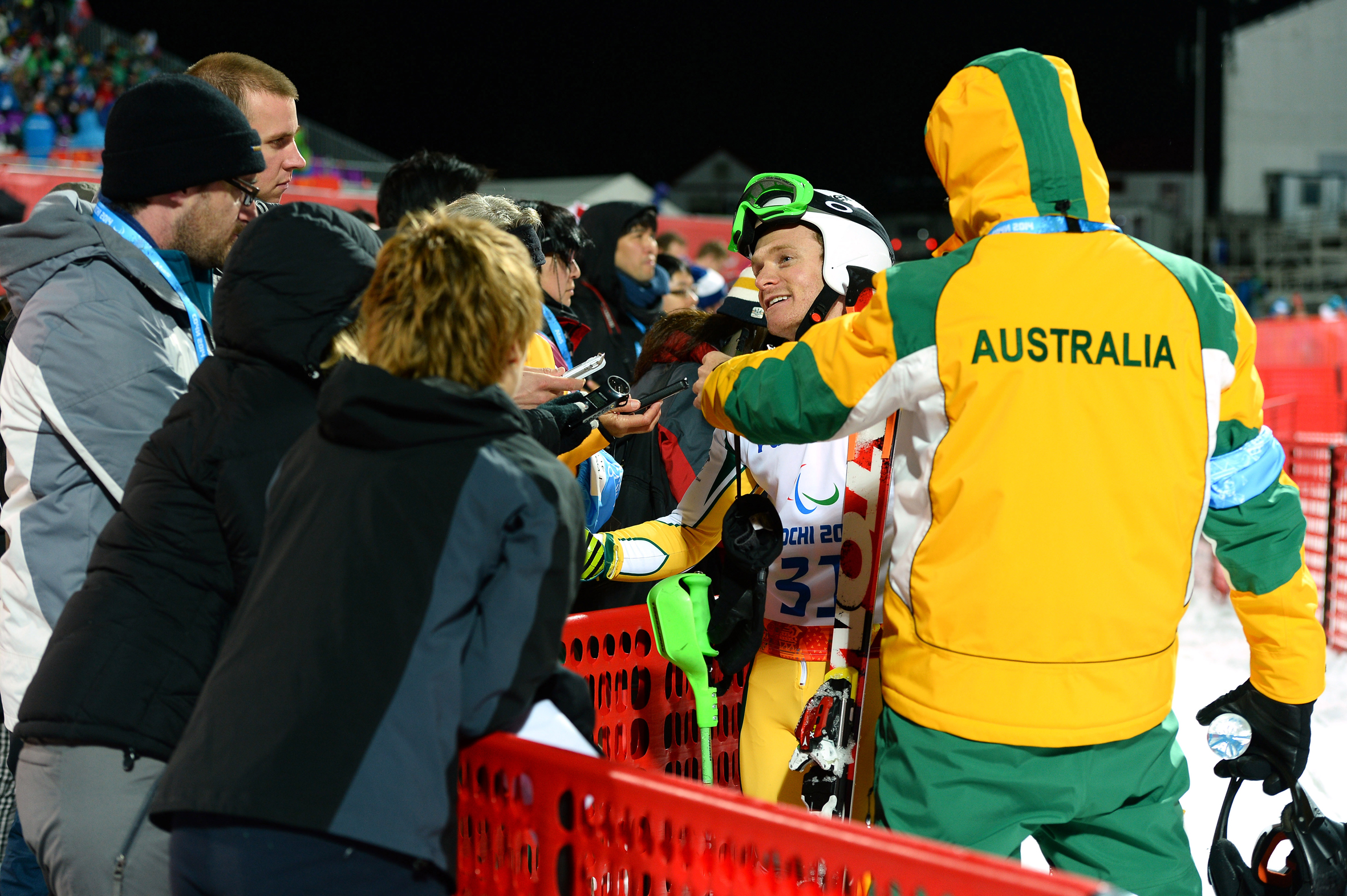
Gourley talks to the media after a race at Sochi 2014 Paralympics

At the December 2011 IPC Nor Am Cup, Gourley won his first gold medal in international competition in the giant slalom, but was beaten by New Zealand's Adam Hall and Australian teammate Toby Kane in the slalom. He competed at a February 2012 World Cup event in Italy in the slalom, but did not place in the event. After sitting in fourth place after his first run, he missed a gate in his second run and was disqualified. He won a gold medal in the giant slalom with a combined run time of 2:03.15, 0.43 seconds faster than the silver medallists. It was the first gold medal he had won at a World Cup.

Gourley started the 2013/14 World Cup season with strong results, with two gold, three silver and one bronze medal. At the 2014 Winter Paralympics in Sochi, he competed in five events. He finished 5th in the men's super combined standing, 7th in the men's downhill standing, and failed to finish in three events.

At the 2015 IPC Alpine Skiing World Championships in Panorama, Canada, Gourley competed in five Men's Standing events. He finished fourth in the giant slalom and fifth in the Super-G.

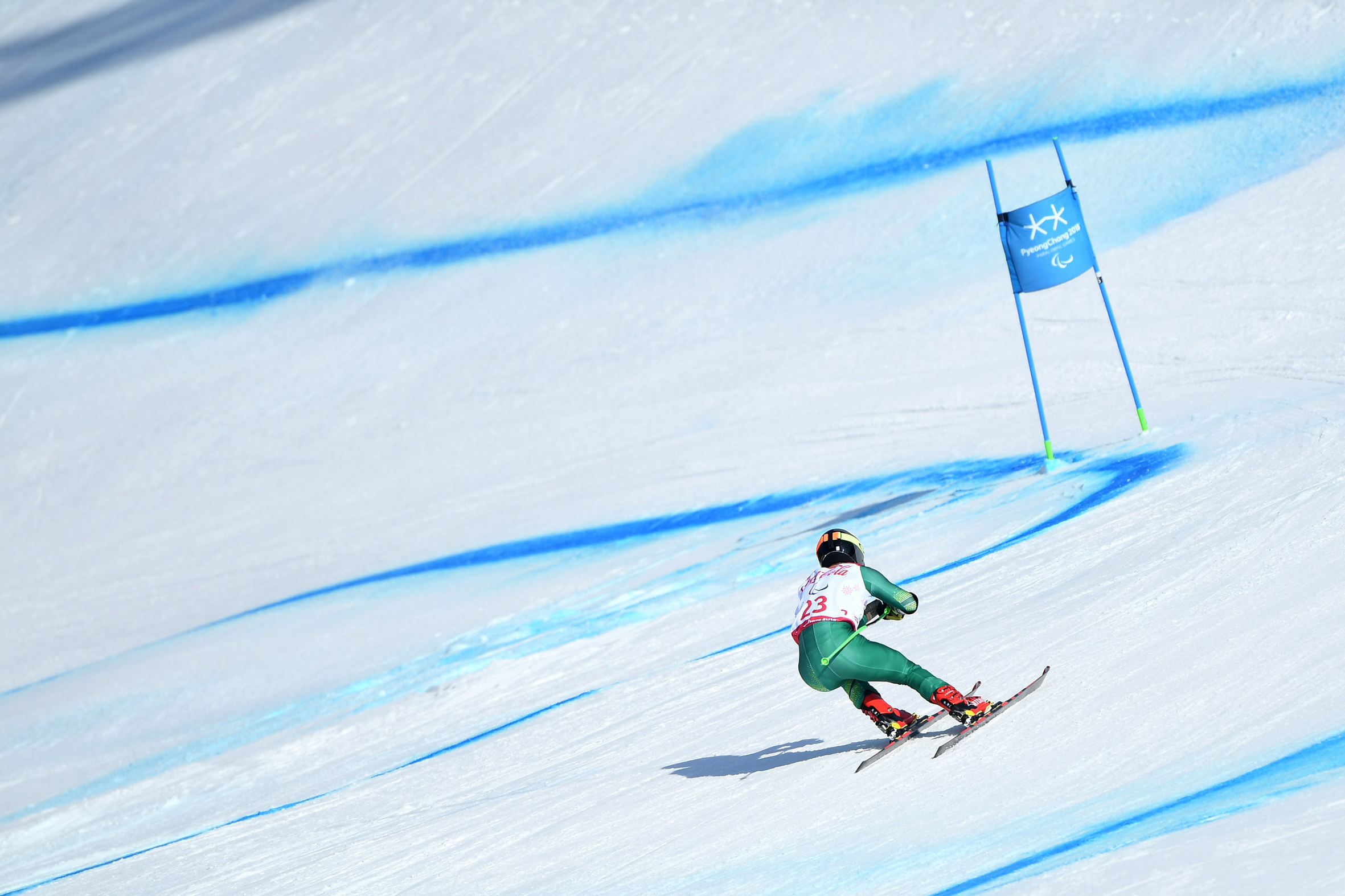
Gourley competes in the SuperG event at the 2018 PyeongChang Paralympics

He finished the 2015/16 World Cup season on a high, placing third on the overall rankings after a successful run of events that saw him podium nine times.

Gourley won the gold medal in the men's Super Combined Standing at the 2017 IPC Alpine Skiing World Championships in Tarvisio, Italy. Gourley was in sixth place after the super-G, but put on a masterclass in the slalom to secure the gold.

His results at the 2018 Winter Paralympics, his third Games, were: fifth in the men's Super Combined Standing, sixth in the men's slalom Standing, eighth in the men's giant slalom Standing, 12th in the men's Super-G Standing and did not finish in the men's Downhill Standing.

At the 2019 World Para Alpine Skiing Championships in Kranjska Gora, Slovenia, he won the bronze medal in Men's slalom Standing and finished fourth in the men's giant slalom Standing.

At the 2022 Winter Paralympics in Beijing, he finished 10th in the giant slalom Standing, 13th in Super Combined Standing and 20th in Downhill Standing. He did not finish in the slalom Standing and Super G Standing. Gourley indicated that the Beijing Games would be his last Winter Paralympics.

In 2022, he is a member of the Athlete Commission for World Para Alpine Skiing and Paralympics Australia Athlete Commission.

== Recognition ==
- 2016 – Ski and Snowboard Australia Para-athlete of the Year
- 2017 – Ski and Snowboard Australia Para-athlete of the Year
- 2017 – Victorian Disability Sport and Recreation Awards – Male Sportsperson of the Year
- 2017 – Victorian Institute of Sport Elite Athlete with a Disability Award
- 2017 – Australian Institute of Sport Para Performance of the Year.
- 2018 – Co-captain with Joany Badenhorst of the Australian Team at 2018 Winter Paralympics
- 2019 - Victorian Institute of Sport William Angliss Performance Lifestyle Award.
- 2022 - Carried Flag at Opening Ceremony of 2022 Winter Paralympics with Melissa Perrine.
