= Mollie Jepsen =

Canadian para-alpine skier

Personal information
- Nationality: Canadian
- Born: September 17, 1999 (age 27) West Vancouver, British Columbia, Canada
- Height: 4 ft 8 in (142 cm)

Sport
- Sport: Para-alpine skiing
- Coached by: Jean-Sebastien Labrie
Medal record
Women's para alpine skiing
Representing Canada
Winter Paralympics
| Gold medal – first place | 2018 Pyeongchang | Super Combined standing |
| Gold medal – first place | 2022 Beijing | Downhill standing |
| Silver medal – second place | 2018 Pyeongchang | Slalom standing |
| Silver medal – second place | 2022 Beijing | Giant slalom standing |
| Bronze medal – third place | 2018 Pyeongchang | Downhill standing |
| Bronze medal – third place | 2018 Pyeongchang | Giant slalom standing |

Mollie Jepsen (born September 17, 1999) is a Canadian alpine skier, who competed at the 2018, 2022 and 2026 Winter Paralympic Games.

== Early life ==
Jepsen was born in West Vancouver, British Columbia without several fingers on her left hand. She learned to ski by the age of two and also took gymnastics classes. Growing up, she attended West Vancouver Secondary, from which she graduated in 2017.

== Career ==
She was influenced to start competitive skiing after watching the 2010 Winter Olympics and joined the Whistler Mountain Ski Club. However, when she was 13 she tore her right anterior cruciate ligament (ACL) and again when she was 15.

Despite this, she was selected to compete with Team Canada during the 2018–19 season. Upon returning to British Columbia after partaking in Team Canada's summer training camp in Chile, she was diagnosed with Crohn’s disease. She qualified for the 2018 Winter Paralympics in PyeongChang, South Korea, where she won her first gold medal in the super combined event. She also won a silver medal in the slalom and two bronze medals in downhill and giant slalom.

She was named the Female Para-Alpine Athlete of the Year at the Audi 2018 Canadian Ski Racing Awards and the Best Female Athlete at the 2018 Canadian Paralympic Sport Awards.

She won Canada's first gold, the gold medal in the women's downhill standing event at the 2022 Winter Paralympics held in Beijing, China. She also won silver in the giant slalom and was honoured to be chosen to be Canada's flag carrier in the closing ceremonies.

Jepsen qualified to compete in the 2026 Winter Paralympics. After finishing fourth in the downhill, it was announced that she wouldn’t compete in any other events, after aggravating a previous knee injury in the downhill.
