= Ammi Hondo =

Japanese para-alpine skier (born 1997)

Personal information
- Nationality: Japanese
- Born: January 2, 1997 (age 29) height 153 cm Tokorozawa, Japan

Sport
- Country: Japan
- Sport: Para-alpine skiing
- Disability class: LW6/8-2
Medal record
Women's Alpine skiing
IPC Alpine Skiing World Championships
Bronze medal – third place	2019 Sella Nevea/Kranjska Gora	Downhill, standing

Ammi Hondo (本堂 杏実, Hondō Ammi; born 2 January 1997) is a Japanese para-alpine skier.

== Career ==
She won a bronze medal at the 2019 World Para Alpine Skiing Championships in the downhill competition.

She also participated in the women's super combined and women's super-G competitions as well as the women's slalom and women's giant slalom competitions at the 2018 Winter Paralympics.

She also competed at the 2022 Winter Paralympics held in Beijing, China and the 2026 Winter Paralympics held in Milan and Cortina d'Ampezzo, Italy.

== Personal life ==
Hondo was born without fingers on her left hand.
