= Menna Fitzpatrick =

British para-alpine skier

Menna Fitzpatrick MBE
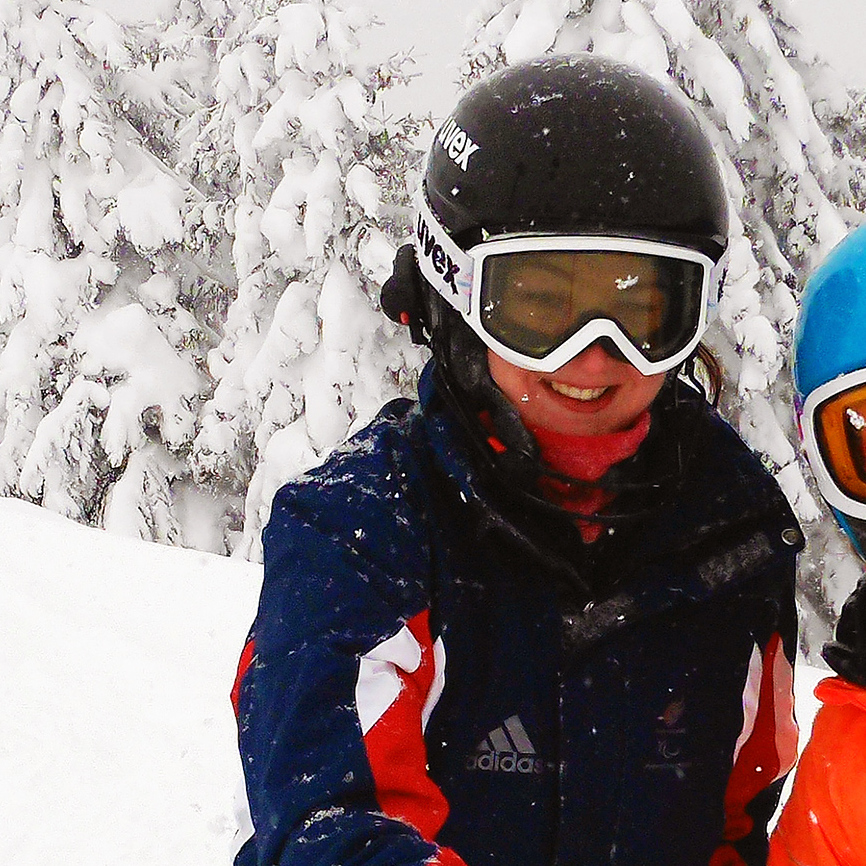
- Menna Fitzpatrick selfie

Personal information
- Nationality: British
- Born: 5 May 1998 (age 28) Macclesfield, England
- Height: 1.5 m (5 ft 4 in)
- Weight: 55 kg (121 lb)

Sport
- Country: Great Britain
- Sport: Para-alpine skiing
- Disability class: B2
- Partner: Katie Guest
- Former partner: Jennifer Kehoe
- Coached by: Amanda Pirie
Medal record
Women's para alpine skiing
Representing Great Britain
Paralympic Games
Gold medal – first place	2018 Pyeongchang	Slalom
Silver medal – second place	2018 Pyeongchang	Super combined
Silver medal – second place	2018 Pyeongchang	Giant slalom
Silver medal – second place	2022 Beijing	Super-G
Bronze medal – third place	2018 Pyeongchang	Super-G
Bronze medal – third place	2022 Beijing	Super combined
World Championships
Gold medal – first place	2019 Sella Nevea	Downhill
Gold medal – first place	2019 Sella Nevea/Kranjska Gora	Super-G
Gold medal – first place	2021 Lillehammer	Slalom
Silver medal – second place	2019 Sella Nevea	Slalom
Silver medal – second place	2019 Sella Nevea	Combined
Silver medal – second place	2021 Lillehammer	Super combined
Silver medal – second place	2023 Lleida	Giant slalom
Bronze medal – third place	2017 Tarvisio	Giant slalom
Bronze medal – third place	2019 Sella Nevea	Giant slalom
Bronze medal – third place	2023 Lleida	Slalom

Menna Fitzpatrick MBE (born 5 May 1998) is a British alpine skier. She is visually impaired having only 5% vision and formerly skied with guide Jennifer Kehoe until 2021. They competed at the 2018 Winter Paralympics in Pyeongchang in March 2018 where they took four medals, including a gold in the slalom, making Fitzpatrick Team GB's most decorated Winter Paralympian.

== Early life and training ==
She was born in Macclesfield, Cheshire, attended Fallibroome Academy, and studied Media Production at the University of Manchester. Fitzpatrick has congenital retinal folds, meaning that she has had no vision in her left eye and limited sight in her right eye since birth. Despite this, she learned to ski whilst on family holidays from the age of five with her father acting as her guide. She was discovered by a coach whilst skiing at the Chill Factore indoor slope in Manchester in 2010, and subsequently started training with the British Para Snowsport team. She made her international debut for Great Britain in 2012.

== Skiing career ==
In 2016, Fitzpatrick and Kehoe were the first British winners of the overall World Cup Visually Impaired title at the International Paralympic Committee's World Cup in Aspen. It was Fitzpatrick's first season competing at World Cup level: she and Kehoe also won the discipline title for giant slalom that season, as well as placing second in the super-G classification and third in the downhill and slalom standings. In 2016, she was awarded the Ski Club of Great Britain's annual Evie Pinching award "which celebrates the next generation of young, up-and-coming snow sports athletes".

In October 2016, Fitzpatrick broke her hand during super-G training ahead of the 2016–17 season, keeping her off the snow for two months and requiring her to have surgery. Despite this, she and Kehoe were able to claim a bronze medal in the giant slalom at the 2017 World Para Alpine Skiing Championships in Tarvisio. The following season the pair took the discipline World Cup title for super-G.

At the 2018 Winter Paralympics, Fitzpatrick and Kehoe took a bronze in the super-G and two silvers in the combined and the giant slalom before taking slalom gold on the final day of the Games.

Fitzpatrick was appointed Member of the Order of the British Empire (MBE) in the 2018 Birthday Honours for "Services to Paralympic Winter Olympic Sport".

At the 2019 World Para Alpine Skiing Championships Fitzpatrick and Kehoe took five medals, securing bronze in the giant slalom and silver in the slalom before winning gold in the downhill ahead of compatriots Kelly Gallagher and Gary Smith, becoming the first British skiers to win both Paralympic and World Para titles. They then took a second gold in the super-G before rounding off their championships with a second silver in the combined.

On 25 August 2021, she announced the end of her partnership with Kehoe and that she was seeking a new guide. In 2022, she won the silver medal in the women's visually impaired super combined event at the 2021 World Para Snow Sports Championships held in Lillehammer, Norway alongside new guide, Katie Guest (sister of British Alpine World Cup skier, Charlie Guest).

She won two medals in alpine skiing at the 2022 Winter Paralympics held in Beijing, China.

On 22 November 2024, it was revealed Fitzpatrick had broken her leg in training, requiring surgery and causing her to miss the majority of the season.

On 22 December 2025, it was revealed Fitzpatrick had suffered a knee injury, casting doubt on whether she will be able to compete in the Paralympics in February 2026.
