= Josef Lahner =

Austrian para-alpine skier

Sport
- Country: Austria
- Sport: Para-alpine skiing
Medal record
Men's Alpine skiing
Silver medal – second place	2019 Sella Nevea/Kranjska Gora	Downhill, visually impaired
Bronze medal – third place	2019 Sella Nevea/Kranjska Gora	Giant slalom, visually impaired
Bronze medal – third place	2019 Sella Nevea/Kranjska Gora	Slalom, visually impaired

Josef Lahner is an Austrian para-alpine skier. His guide is Franz Erharter.

Lahner won a silver medal and two bronze medals at the 2019 World Para Alpine Skiing Championships. Lahner and Erharter competed in all five events but were disqualified in the Super-G and Super combined events as they missed the last gate.
