= Bobbi Kelly =

Australian skier & sighted guide (born 1994)

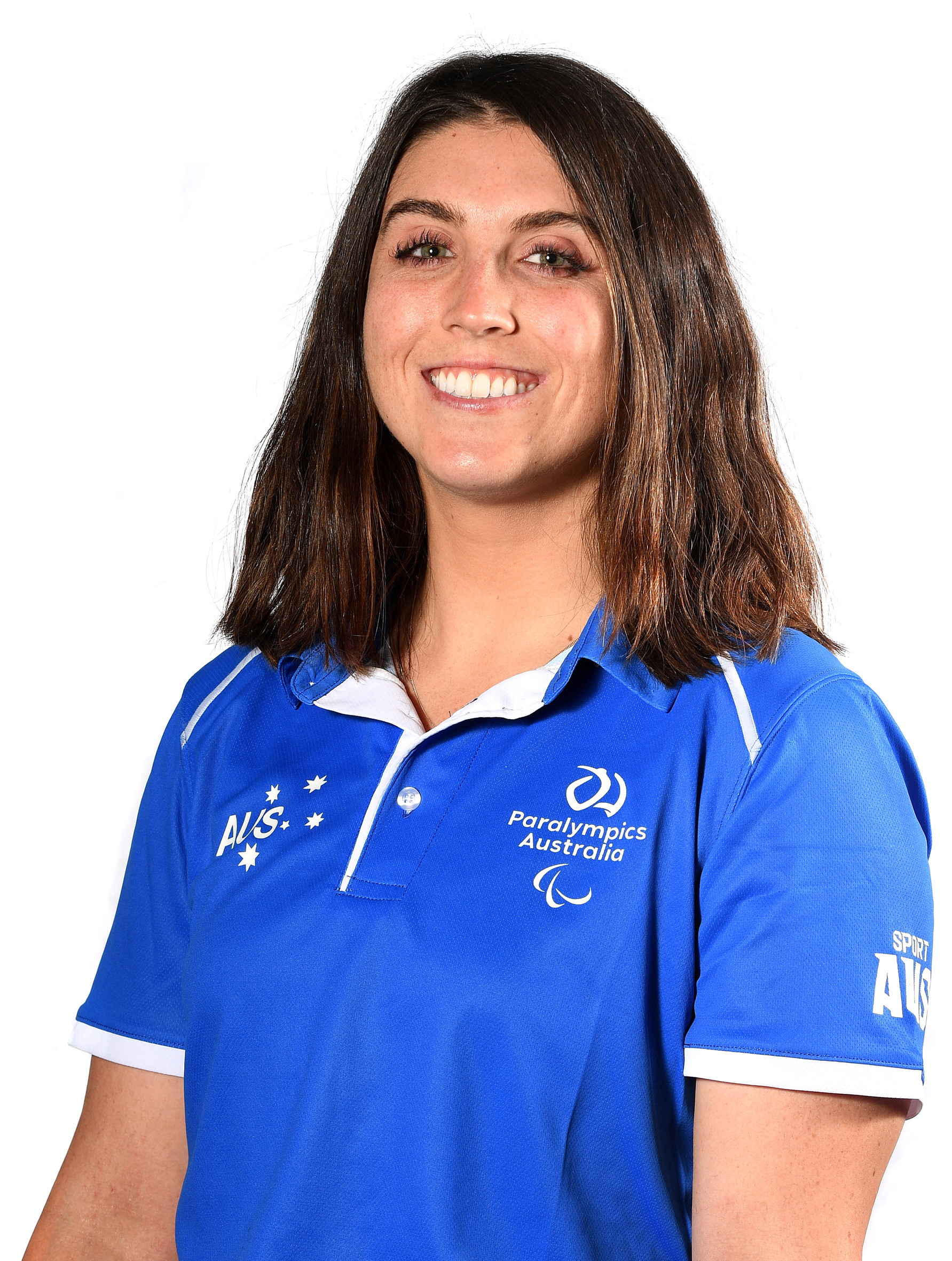
- Bobbi Kelly in April 2021

Personal information
- Nationality: Australia
- Born: 6 February 1994 (age 32)

Sport
- Country: Australia
- Sport: Para-alpine skiing
- Event: Giant slalom slalom
Medal record
Guide for women's para-alpine skiing

Bobbi Kelly (born 6 February 1994) is an Australian skier and sighted guide for visually impaired skiers. She was Melissa Perrine's guide at the 2022 Winter Paralympics.

== Skiing ==
Kelly's home ski resort of Perisher, New South Wales. She has a Level 4 Australian Professional Snowsport Instructors Inc (APSI) and is a Level 1/2 Trainer for APSI.

Kelly is the guide for Paralympic skier Melissa Perrine. Perrine with Kelly won the gold medal in the women's Super Combined Visually Impaired, silver medals in the women's giant slalom and Women's Super G Visually Impaired and the bronze medal in the women's slalom visually impaired at 2019 World Para Alpine Skiing Championships in Kranjska Gora, Slovenia.

In 2020, Kelly was a participant in the Australian Institute of Sport Talent Program, a program to place more women in leadership positions in Australian Sport.

At the 2022 Winter Paralympics, Melissa Perrine with her guide Kelly, she finished sixth in the women's giant slalom visually impaired and failed to finish the second run in the women's slalom visually impaired.
