= Eléonor Sana =

Belgian para-alpine skier (born 1997)

Personal information
- Nationality: Belgian
- Born: 1 July 1997 (age 29) Woluwe, Belgium

Sport
- Country: Belgium
- Sport: Paralympic alpine skiing
- Disability class: B2
- Partner: Chloe Sana
- Coached by: Stefan Sazio
Medal record
Women's para-alpine skiing
Representing Belgium
Winter Paralympics
Bronze medal – third place	2018 Pyeongchang	Downhill, visually impaired
World Para Alpine Skiing Championships
Silver medal – second place	2017 Tarvisio	Super-G, visually impaired
Bronze medal – third place	2017 Tarvisio	Downhill, visually impaired

Eléonor Sana (born 1 July 1997) is a retired Belgian visually impaired alpine skier.

Sana was born on July 1, 1997, in Woluwe in the Brussels region. When she was 6 weeks old, she developed bilateral genetic retinoblastoma, a cancer that affects the retina of both eyes. Having gone blind as a result of that disease, she took up alpine skiing in 2014.

At the 2017 World Para Alpine Skiing Championships in Tarvisio, Italy, Eléonor, guided by her sister Chloé, won a silver resp. bronze medal in the Super-G and downhill for the visually impaired.

Sana was the flagbearer for Belgium at the 2018 Winter Paralympics during the opening ceremony. During her events at the 2018 Paralympics, Sana paired with her sister, Chloe Sana, who skied as her sighted guide.

Competing in her first Paralympic event, Sana won a bronze medal in the women's visually impaired downhill event during the 2018 Winter Paralympics.. She was Belgium's first female medallist at a Paralympic Winter Games. Since making their Winter Paralympic debut at the first Games in Ornskoldsvik, Sweden, in 1976, Belgium had been able to reach the podium only once through alpine skier Willy Mercier, who claimed bronze in the men's super-G B1 at the 1994 Winter Paralympics in Lillehammer, Norway.

Soon after their Olympic success, Chloé and Eléonor decided to quit the sport. Eléonor works in IT and Chloé became a school teacher.

The comic book Sœurs de Glisse (Sisters of the Glide), published in 2026, by French author Gwénola Morizur and Italian illustrator Agnese Innocente, largely inspired by their life, tells the story of the sisters who team up and become ski champions against all odds.
