= Frédérique Turgeon =

Canadian para-alpine skier (born 1999)

Personal information
- Nationality: Canadian
- Born: March 25, 1999 (age 27)

Sport
- Country: Canada
- Sport: Para-alpine skiing
- Disability class: LW2
- Coached by: Lasse Ericsson
Medal record
Women's Alpine skiing
Canada Games
Gold medal – first place	2015 Prince George	Slalom, standing
World Championships
Silver medal – second place	2019 Sella Nevea	Slalom, standing
Bronze medal – third place	2019 Sella Nevea	Super-G, standing
Bronze medal – third place	2019 Sella Nevea	Super combined, standing
Bronze medal – third place	2023 Lleida	Downhill, standing

Frédérique Turgeon (born March 25, 1999) is a Canadian para-alpine skier and a Big Brother Célébrités contestant in 2024 and 2025.

== Career ==
She won gold at the 2015 Canada Winter Games and silver and bronze twice at the 2019 World Para Alpine Skiing Championships. She also represented Canada at the 2018 Winter Paralympics and finished ninth in the giant slalom.

She was born with congenital femoral deficiency resulting in one of her legs being 50% shorter than the other. She broke her leg during a crash in December 2013. After the crash she stopped competing on both legs and now competes on one leg.
