= Christian Geiger =

Australian alpine skier (born 1988)

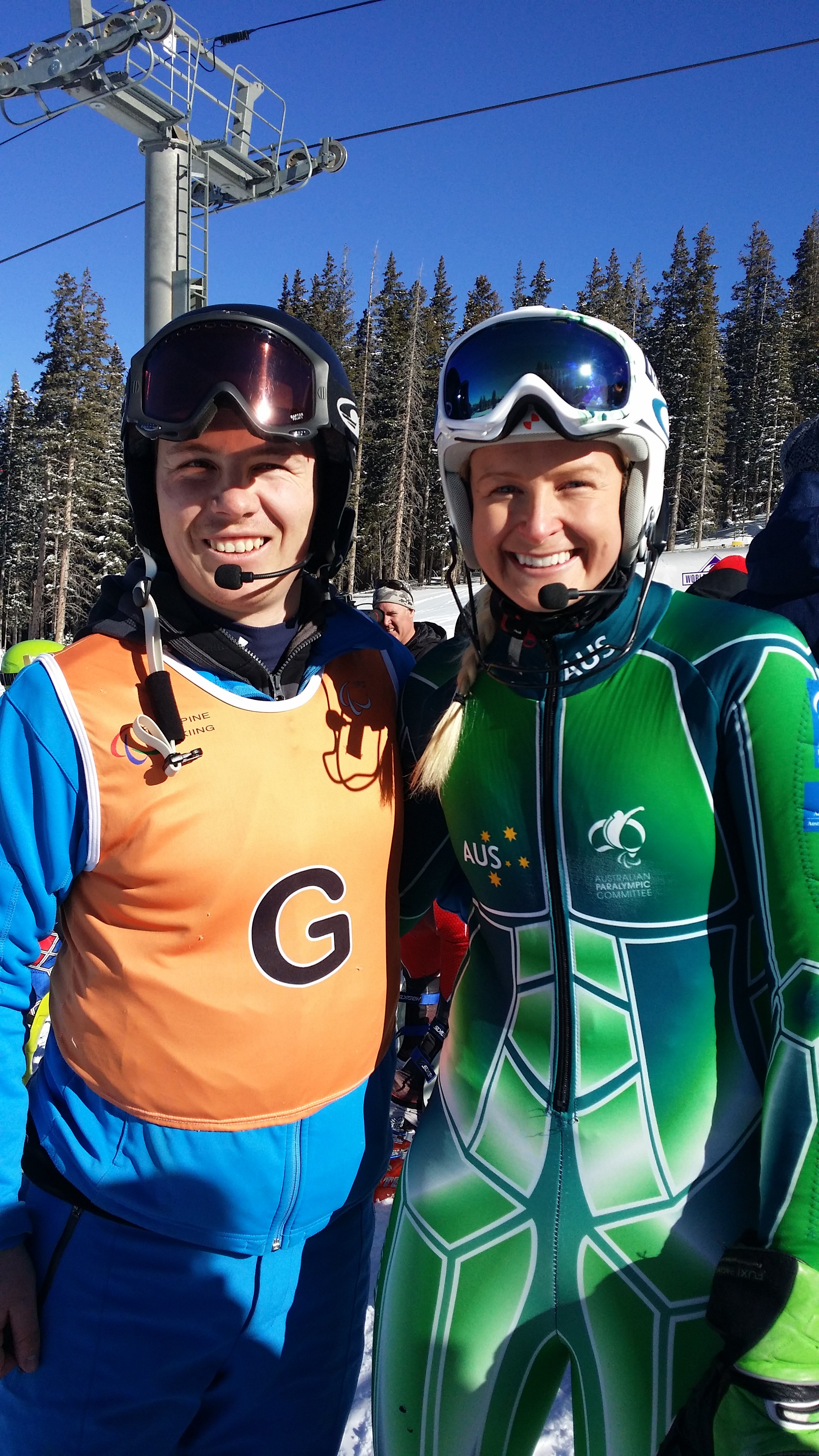
- Christian Geiger and Jessica Gallagher in December 2013. The microphones allow them to communicate with each other.

Personal information
- Born: 29 March 1988 (age 38) St Leonards, New South Wales

Sport
- Country: Australia
- Sport: Para-alpine skiing
- Events: Downhill; Super-G giant slalom slalom Super Combined
Medal record
Guide for women's para-alpine skiing
Winter Paralympic Games
Bronze medal – third place	2014 Sochi	Giant slalom visually impaired
Bronze medal – third place	2018 Pyeongchang	Super combined visually impaired
Bronze medal – third place	2018 Pyeongchang	Giant slalom visually impaired

Christian Geiger (born 29 March 1988) is an Australian Alpine skier, Paralympic alpine ski coach and sighted guide for visually impaired skiers. He was Jessica Gallagher's guide skier at the 2014 Winter Paralympics in Sochi, winning a bronze medal. He represented Australia at the 2008 World Junior Alpine Skiing Championships and the 2009 FIS Alpine World Ski Championships, but his career was cut short when he was severely injured in a traffic collision in 2009. He became Jessica Gallagher's sighted guide in 2013, and guided her to silver medals in women's slalom and giant slalom at the 2013 IPC Alpine Skiing World Cup in Thredbo. Geiger was Melissa Perrine's guide and coach at the 2018 Winter Paralympics where she won two bronze medals.

== Personal ==
Geiger was born on 29 March 1988 in St Leonards, New South Wales, Australia, but lived in Austria until he was eight. On 26 September 2009, he was involved in a car crash. The vehicle he was travelling in as a passenger slammed into a tree just 30 metres (98 ft) from his family's home in Bright, Victoria. He suffered severe injuries to his arm, spleen and liver as well as serious brain trauma. As a result, he was in an induced coma for a week. It took months before he could walk, talk and eat independently again. As of August 2011, he had ten operations, extensive physiotherapy and speech therapy.

== Skiing ==
Geiger began skiing at the age of two in Austria, and made the national team in 2006. He won numerous Australian Championships during his teenage years, and represented Australia at the 2008 World Junior Alpine Skiing Championships and the 2009 FIS Alpine World Ski Championships. This changed after his 2009 accident. "I tried to get back to able bodied [competition] but couldn't quite get back to where I was, let alone where I wanted to go," he later explained, "so I had to hang it up."

In 2013, Australian Paralympic Alpine Head Coach Steve Graham asked Geiger to replace Eric Bickerton as Jessica Gallagher's sighted guide. In their first competition, the 2013 IPC Alpine Skiing World Cup in Thredbo, New South Wales, he guided Gallagher to silver medals in women's slalom and giant slalom.

Gallagher gave an insight on taking on Geiger as a guide. She said:

Every run that we are spending together at the moment, Christian is learning new things about the way that I ski, about the things that I need to be told when I'm going down the hill in terms of the things that I'm not seeing and also the things that may throw me and really test me as an athlete because at the end of the day his role as a guide is to get me down to the bottom as fast as possible, but also as safe as possible. It just happens with time really.

Geiger was guide to Gallagher at the 2014 Winter Paralympics in Sochi, where they won a bronze medal in the women's giant slalom visually impaired event. They came seventh in the women's slalom visually impaired. In 2015, he was Head Coach of Australia’s Para-Alpine skiing program.

Following Gallagher's move to para-cycling, Geiger became sighted guide to Melissa Perrine. At the 2018 Winter Paralympics in Pyeongchang, Geiger guided Perrine to bronze medal wins in the women's super combined and giant slalom visually impaired events. The pair also placed fourth in the slalom and fifth in the downhill and super-G visually impaired.

In November 2018, Geiger won the New South Wales Institute of Sport 7News Spirit of Sport Award, as voted by the public, for his act of generosity in flying Perrine’s family to PyeongChang, allowing them to watch her compete at the Winter Paralympics.

At the 2019 Australian Ski and Snowboard Awards, Geiger with Ryan Pearl was named Coach of the Year (Paralympic disciplines).
