= Melissa Perrine =

Australian para-alpine skier (born 1988)

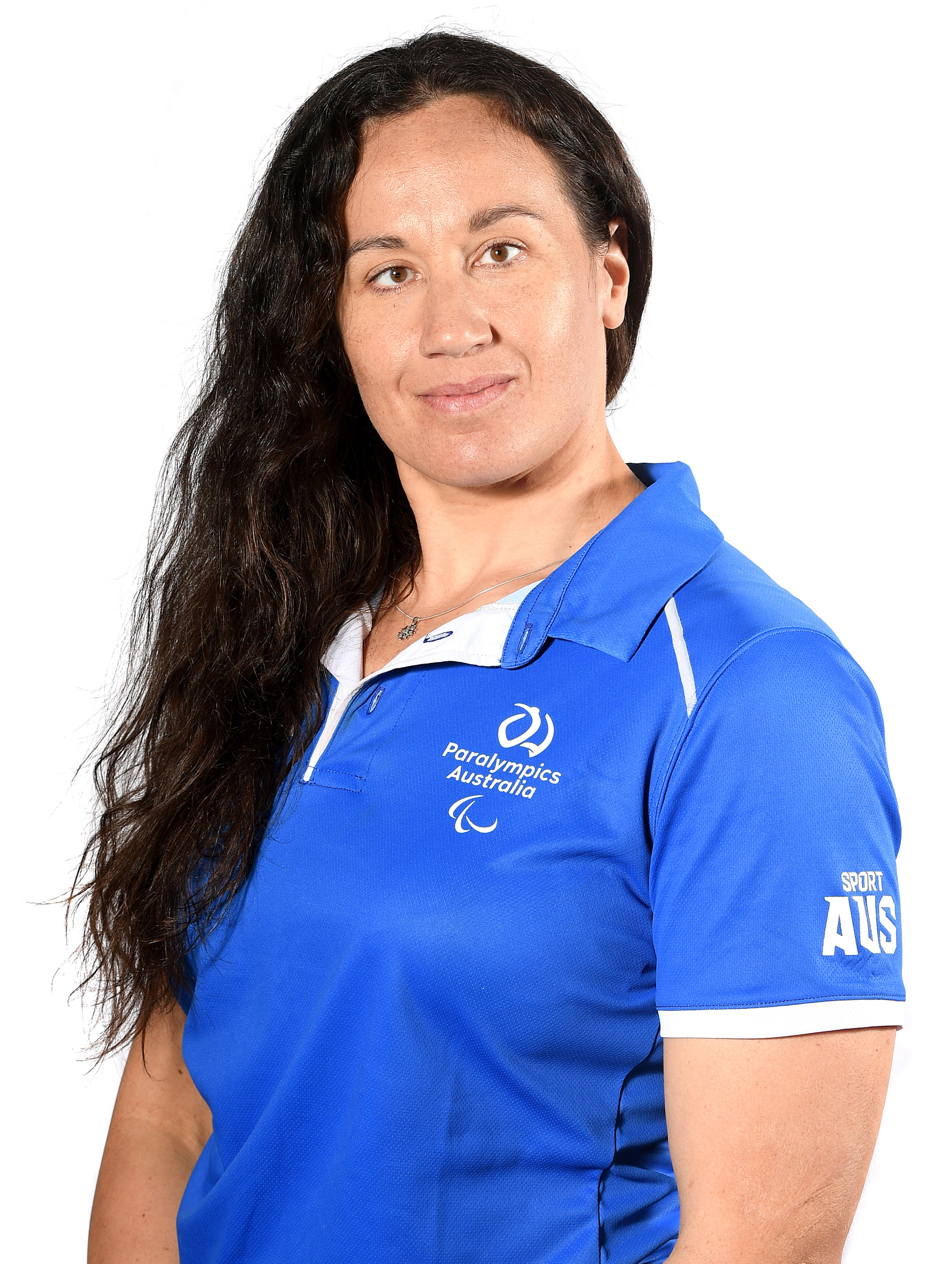
- Melissa Perrine in March 2019

Personal information
- Nationality: Australia
- Born: 21 February 1988 (age 38) Nowra, New South Wales

Sport
- Country: Australia
- Sport: Para-alpine skiing
- Disability class: B2
- Events: Downhill; Super-G; Giant Slalom; Slalom; Super Combined

Achievements and titles
- Paralympic finals: 2010 Winter Paralympics; 2014 Winter Paralympics
Medal record
Women's alpine skiing
Winter Paralympics
Bronze medal – third place	2018 Pyeongchang	Super Combined Visually Impaired
Bronze medal – third place	2018 Pyeongchang	Giant Slalom Visually Impaired
IPC Alpine Skiing World Championships
Gold medal – first place	2015 Panorama	Downhill Visually Impaired
Gold medal – first place	2015 Panorama	Super-G Visually Impaired
Gold medal – first place	2015 Panorama	Super Combined Visually Impaired
Gold medal – first place	2019 Kranjska Gora	Super Combined Visually Impaired
Silver medal – second place	2011 Sestriere	Downhill VI
Silver medal – second place	2015 Panorama	Slalom Visually Impaired
Silver medal – second place	2019 Kranjska Gora	Giant Slalom Visually Impaired
Silver medal – second place	2019 Kranjska Gora	Women's Super G Visually Impaired
Bronze medal – third place	2011 Sestriere	Super G
Bronze medal – third place	2011 Sestriere	Super Combined
Bronze medal – third place	2015 Panorama	Giant Slalom Visually Impaired
Bronze medal – third place	2019 Kranjska Gora	Slalom Visually Impaired
New Zealand Winter Games
Gold medal – first place	2011 Queenstown	Giant Slalom Visually Impaired
Gold medal – first place	2011 Queenstown	Slalom Visually Impaired
Gold medal – first place	2011 Queenstown	Super G Visually Impaired

Melissa Perrine (born 21 February 1988) is a B2 classified visually impaired para-alpine skier from Australia. She has competed at the four Winter Paralympics from 2010 to 2022. At the 2015 IPC Alpine Skiing World Championships, she won three gold, one silver and one bronze medals. At the 2018 Winter Paralympics, she won two bronze medals.

== Personal ==
Melissa Perrine was born in Nowra, New South Wales, on 21 February 1988. In 2007, the Wingecarribee Council area named her their Young Australian of the Year. She was featured on the Australian Broadcasting Corporation's X Paralympic Games in March 2010. She was born with four separate eye conditions, including cataracts, nystagmus, micropthalmia and glaucoma. Her eyesight has been slowly deteriorating since she was very young. Her vision is limited to blurry shapes and colours. As of 2014, she lives in Welby, New South Wales, and is studying Exercise Science at the Australian Catholic University in Sydney. In 2011, she completed a Bachelor of Exercise Science followed by a Master of Exercise Science in 2012 at the Australian Catholic University. She completed a Master of Physiotherapy at Western Sydney University.

== Skiing ==
Melissa Perrine interview conducted for Wikinews

Perrine is a B2 classified visually impaired skier. She gets direction on the course from a guide who uses a microphone and speakers to communicate with her on the course. She first skied with her sighted guide Andy Bor in 2009 in competition at the IPC North America Cup in Colorado, where she finished second in the super-G. She was officially named on the Australian 2010 Winter Paralympics team in November 2009. Alongside Jessica Gallagher, she was one of two women named to the team. It was only the second time Australia sent women to the Winter Paralympics. A ceremony was held in Canberra with Australian Paralympic Committee president Greg Hartung and Minister for Sport Kate Ellis making the announcement.

At a 2010 World Cup event in Italy ahead of the Paralympics, Perrine fractured the ischium bone in her hip as a result of a fall. She returned to Australia. She was back on the slopes by the end of the 2009/2010 skiing season, and competed in the 2010 World Cup in Aspen, Colorado. She earned a silver medal and a pair of bronze medals at the event.

Perrine and the rest of Australia's Para-alpine team arrived in the Paralympic village on 9 March 2010 for the 2010 Winter Paralympics. While at the Games, she competed in the Downhill, super-G, super combined and giant slalom events. She finished seventh in the visually impaired super-G, approximately 12.54 seconds behind gold medal-winning Slovak skier Henrieta Farkasova. She did not finish in the super combined event. Following her first run in the Super G, she was in sixth place, but she did not finish her second run and did not place. She and Bor finished fifth in the 2,139 metres (7,018 ft) downhill.

At the 2011 IPC Alpine Skiing World Championships, with Bor as her guide, Perrine won a silver medal in the vision-impaired downhill event, the first one ever earned by an Australian woman at the event. She also earned bronze medals in the women's vision impaired Super Combined and super-G events. At an August 2011 competition in Mt Hutt, New Zealand, she finished first in the women's super G visually impaired event. At the Winter Games IPC event at Coronet Peak that same month, she and Bor finished first in the women's slalom visually impaired event.

At the 2012 World Cup event in Italy, Perrine finished third in the slalom while skiing with Bor. She won a silver medal in the giant slalom.

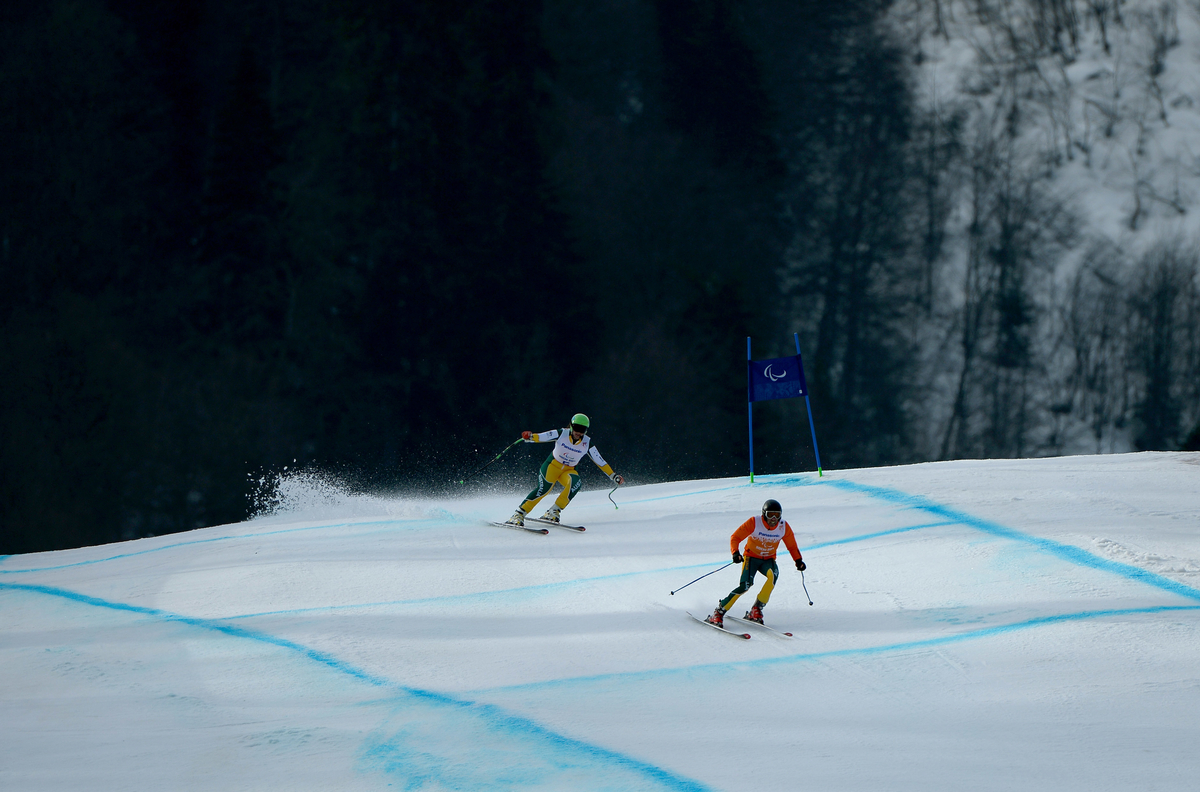
Melissa Perrine and her guide Andy Bor in the Women's Downhill at the 2014 Winter Paralympics

At the 2014 Winter Paralympics in Sochi, Perrine competed in five events. She finished fourth in the women's downhill visually impaired and did not finish in three events. She was disqualified after the slalom leg of the Women's Super Combined for wearing a visor which was taped to her helmet in order to keep rain from her goggles. This was a breach of the IPC Alpine Skiing rules. Jason Hellwig, CEO of the Australian Paralympic Committee described it as "mindnumbingly-dumb mistake" as it was not picked up by relevant team officials. He indicated it was an honest mistake and there was no intention to cheat.

Perrine with her guide Andy Bor won five medals – three gold, one silver and one bronze in Women's Visually Impaired events at the 2015 IPC Alpine Skiing World Championships in Panorama, Canada. Gold medals were won in the Downhill, Super-G, Super Combined, silver medal in Slalom and bronze medal in the Giant Slalom. Perrine became the only Australian female in alpine skiing to finish on the podium in all five events at an IPC Alpine Skiing World Championships.

At the 2017 IPC Alpine Skiing World Cup Finals in PyeongChang, Perrine and her guide Bor won two bronze medals – downhill and giant slalom. Perrine had a limited 2016/17 season due to her university commitments.

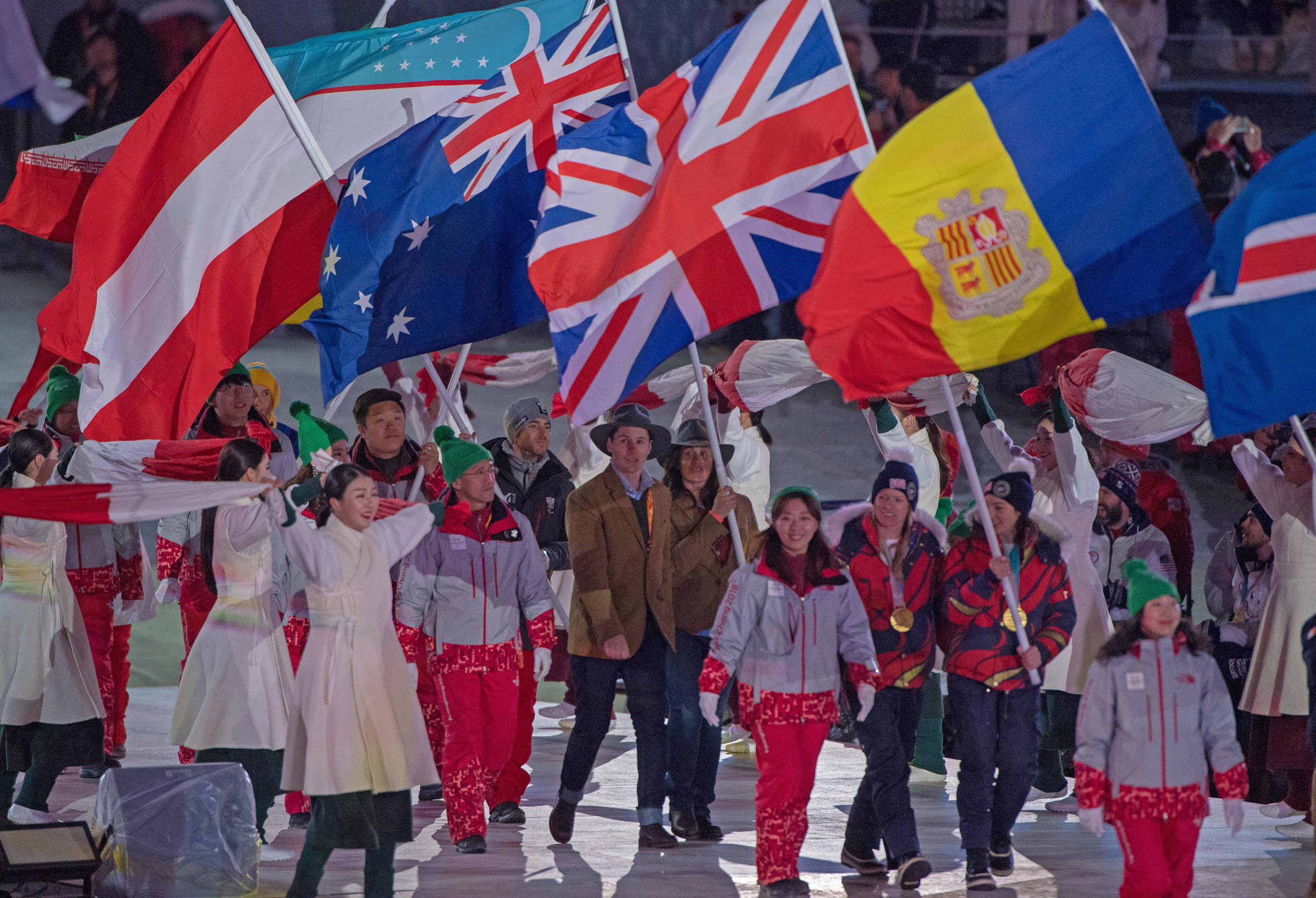
Perrine and guide Christian Geiger carry the Australian flag in the PyeongChang 2018 closing ceremony

She was selected to compete at the 2018 Winter Paralympics, her third Games. At the Games, she won her first Paralympic medal by winning the bronze medal in the Women's Combined Visually Impaired with her guide Christian Geiger, who is also her coach. The following day she won the bronze medal in the Women's Giant Slalom visually Impaired. She had three other top five finishes - fourth in the Women's Slalom Visually Impaired and fifth in both the Women's Downhill Visually Impaired and Women's Super-G Visually Impaired. Perrine was given the honour of the Closing Ceremony flag bearer due to her competing at three Winter Games and winning two bronze medals in PyeongChang.

With her new guide Bobbi Kelly, Perrine won the gold medal in the Women's Super Combined Visually Impaired, silver medals in the Women's Giant Slalom and Women's Super G Visually Impaired and the bronze medal in the Women's Slalom Visually Impaired at 2019 World Para Alpine Skiing Championships in Kranjska Gora, Slovenia. At the 2022 Winter Paralympics with her guide Kelly, she finished sixth in the Women's Giant Slalom Visually Impaired and failed to finish the second run in the Women's Slalom Visually Impaired. Perrine announced her Winter Paralympics Games retirement.

== Recognition ==
- 2018 - New South Wales Institute of Sport Clubs NSW Personal Excellence Award for having coupled her PyeongChang success with the completion of a Masters of Physiotherapy.
- 2019 - Ski and Snowboard Australia - Athlete of the Year (Paralympic disciplines)
- 2019 - Australian Institute of Sport Awards - Female Para-athlete of the Year
- 2022 - Paralympics Australia Female Athlete of the Year
- 2022 - Joint Team Captain with Ben Tudhope of Australian Team at 2022 Winter Paralympics and carried the flag at the Opening Ceremony with Mitchell Gourley
