= Heike Eder =

Austrian Paralympic alpine skier

Personal information
- Nationality: Austrian
- Born: 30 May 1988 (age 38) Feldkirch, Vorarlberg, Austria
- Spouse: Armin Eder

Sport
- Country: Austria
- Sport: Paralympic alpine skiing
Medal record
Women's paralympic alpine skiing
Representing Austria
Winter Paralympics
Bronze medal – third place	2018 Pyeongchang	Slalom sitting

Heike Eder (born 30 May 1988), also known as Heike Tuertscher or Heike Türtscher, is an Austrian Paralympic alpine skier. She made her Winter Paralympic debut during the 2018 Winter Paralympics and claimed her only Paralympic medal by clinching a bronze in the women's slalom alpine skiing sitting event.
