= Millie Knight =

British Paralympic athlete

Personal information
- Nationality: British
- Born: 15 January 1999 (age 27) Canterbury, Kent, England
- Education: University of Kent, King's College London
- Other interests: karate and taekwondo

Sport
- Country: Great Britain
- Sport: Alpine skiing karate Taekwondo
- Disability: Visually Impaired
- Disability class: B2
- Event(s): Slalom, giant slalom, downhill, super-G, super combined
- Club: https://karateashford.co.uk
- Coached by: Scott Macbain
- Retired: Retired from Alpine-Skiing in 2023

Achievements and titles
- Paralympic finals: Sochi Winter Paralympics 2014 Pyeongchang Winter Paralympics 2018 Beijing Winter Paralympics 2022
- World finals: World Cup Globe overall giant slalom, super-G and downhill winner. WUMF Taekwondo World Champion
- National finals: British Champion
- Highest world ranking: World No. 1 in downhill; No. 2 in super-G; No. 2 in super combined; No. 2 Slalom; No. 2 in giant slalom
Medal record
Women's para alpine skiing
Representing Great Britain
Paralympic Games
Silver medal – second place	2018 Pyeongchang	Downhill
Silver medal – second place	2018 Pyeongchang	Super-G
Bronze medal – third place	2018 Pyeongchang	Slalom
Bronze medal – third place	2022 Beijing	Downhill
World Championships
Gold medal – first place	2017 Tarvisio	Downhill
Gold medal – first place	2022 Lillehammer	Combined
Silver medal – second place	2017 Tarvisio	Combined
Silver medal – second place	2017 Tarvisio	Giant slalom
Silver medal – second place	2017 Tarvisio	Slalom
Silver medal – second place	2015 Panorama	Giant slalom
Bronze medal – third place	2015 Panorama	Slalom
Bronze medal – third place	2022 Lillehammer	Super-G
- Updated on 7 March 2022

Millie Knight (born 15 January 1999) is a British skier and student who competed at international level for ParalympicsGB in alpine skiing in the slalom, giant slalom Super-G, super combined and Downhill events with a sighted guide, Brett Wild. When Knight was one year old, she contracted an illness, diagnosed at age three, which resulted in the loss of most of her vision by the age of six. She joined the Great Britain Paralympic skiing team in 2012, and progressed to compete at international-level events. Knight was the British flagbearer at Sochi in 2014 – her debut Paralympics - where, at the age of 15, she was the youngest person ever to compete for ParalympicsGB at the Winter Games. In the same year Knight also became an Honorary Doctor of the University of Kent.

== Early life and education ==
Knight was born on 15 January 1999 in Canterbury, Kent. She was six when she lost much of her vision; in her left eye, she has 5–10% peripheral vision, and in her right eye, she has 5%.

As of 2014 Knight was studying for her GCSEs in tandem with her sporting career. She was enrolled at King's School in Canterbury; her first year studying there was 2012.

In 2016, Knight obtained 3 A's at A-Level, securing her a place at The University of Kent to study psychology. She later went on to complete her degree at Open University, gaining a First-Class Honours in 2025. She is now studying for a Master's in Physiotherapy at King's College London.

== Martial Arts ==
In 2022, Millie became Commonwealth Karate Champion in para-karate, kata. Earning her place on the England squad for the European Championships in Spain, where she narrowly missed out in the bronze medal match. In 2023, Millie was selected to represent England again at the World Championships in Budapest, securing her ninth place in the World ranking. In 2025, Millie became WUMF World Champion in Taekwondo. She now coaches kyokushin at Kojin-Kai Karate Club

== Skiing career ==
In 2006 at the age of seven, shortly before Knight lost the majority of her sight, she had been to France on a skiing holiday and was encouraged to try the sport by her mother. Knight was inspired to take up the sport competitively when she met sit-skier Sean Rose, shortly after he had competed at the 2010 Winter Paralympics. Her mother was Knight's first sighted guide until late January 2013 for financial reasons. The pair competed together in visually impaired (VI) races.

In November 2012, at age 13, Knight began training with Great Britain's Paralympic development squad. She raced at the Europa Cup in slalom and giant slalom. in spring 2013. Her stand in, temporary sighted guide at the Games, Rachael Ferrier, briefly joined Knight at the end of 2013.

Knight competes in class B2 due to her lack of complete vision.

=== 2014 Paralympics ===
Knight's debut Paralympics was the 2014 Winter Paralympics in Sochi; competing at the age of 15 made her the youngest ParalympicsGB competitor at any Winter Paralympics. She was the flag bearer at the opening ceremony for ParalympicsGB, carrying the flag at the Fisht Olympic Stadium, an honour Knight described as "a surprise". She competed for ParalympicsGB in the slalom on 14 March, completing both of her runs, and finishing fifth, and competed in the giant slalom on 16 March, again finishing fifth. There was not any significant expectation on Knight at the 2014 Paralympics, as her target was the 2018 Winter Paralympics in Pyeongchang.

=== Post-Sochi ===
Following the Sochi games, it was announced in April 2014 that Knight would participate in the Queen's Baton Relay on 5 June 2014, carrying the Baton in Kent.

At Panorama, Knight took part in the two technical events, the slalom and giant slalom, as she was still too young to compete in the speed events. Winning a silver and a bronze i Britain's only two medals of the games.

The following season, Knight teamed up with guide Brett Wild. After initially meeting at a training camp in December 2015, the pair competed together at the World Cup finals in Aspen, Colorado, where they took two wins in the downhill and super-G and a third place in the giant slalom: this success convinced the pair to focus on the speed disciplines, which they felt were their strength.

In the run-up to the 2017 World Para Alpine Skiing Championships in Tarvisio, Italy, Knight enjoyed a great deal of success on the World Cup circuit, taking 11 medals, including seven golds, in the months leading up to the championships. At the championships themselves, Knight and guide Brett Wild took gold in the downhill, beating five-time Paralympic champion Henrieta Farkašová. Team GB officials stated that this was the first world championship title for a British athlete on snow. Knight and Wild subsequently took a silver behind Farkašová in the Super Combined and a second silver in the giant slalom.

After the World Championships in February 2017, Knight sustained a concussion in a crash at the World Cup Finals in March in South Korea. The crash took her out of action for six months. However, she was still crowned World Cup downhill champion for the season.

In July 2017, Knight became an Honorary Doctor of The University of Kent.

=== 2018 Paralympics ===
At the 2018 Paralympics in Pyongchang, South Korea, Knight took two silver medals on the opening weekend of the Games in the downhill and super-G, before taking the bronze in the slalom on the final day of the Paralympics.

=== 2021 World Para Snow Sports Championships ===
In 2022, she won the gold medal in the women's visually impaired super combined event at the 2021 World Para Snow Sports Championships held in Lillehammer, Norway. She also won the bronze medal in the women's visually impaired Super-G event.

=== 2022 Paralympics ===
Millie competed at the Beijing 2022 Winter Paralympics, delivering a strong set of races across the speed events. She secured a bronze medal in the downhill with her guide, adding to her Paralympic podium record. Her results in Beijing reinforced her reputation as one of Britain’s most accomplished para-alpine skiers.

== Personal life ==
In 2023, she was one of the seven celebrities that participated in Pilgrimage: The Road Through Portugal, on a pilgrimage to Fátima.
