= Kelly Gallagher (alpine skier) =

British skier

Kelly Gallagher MBE
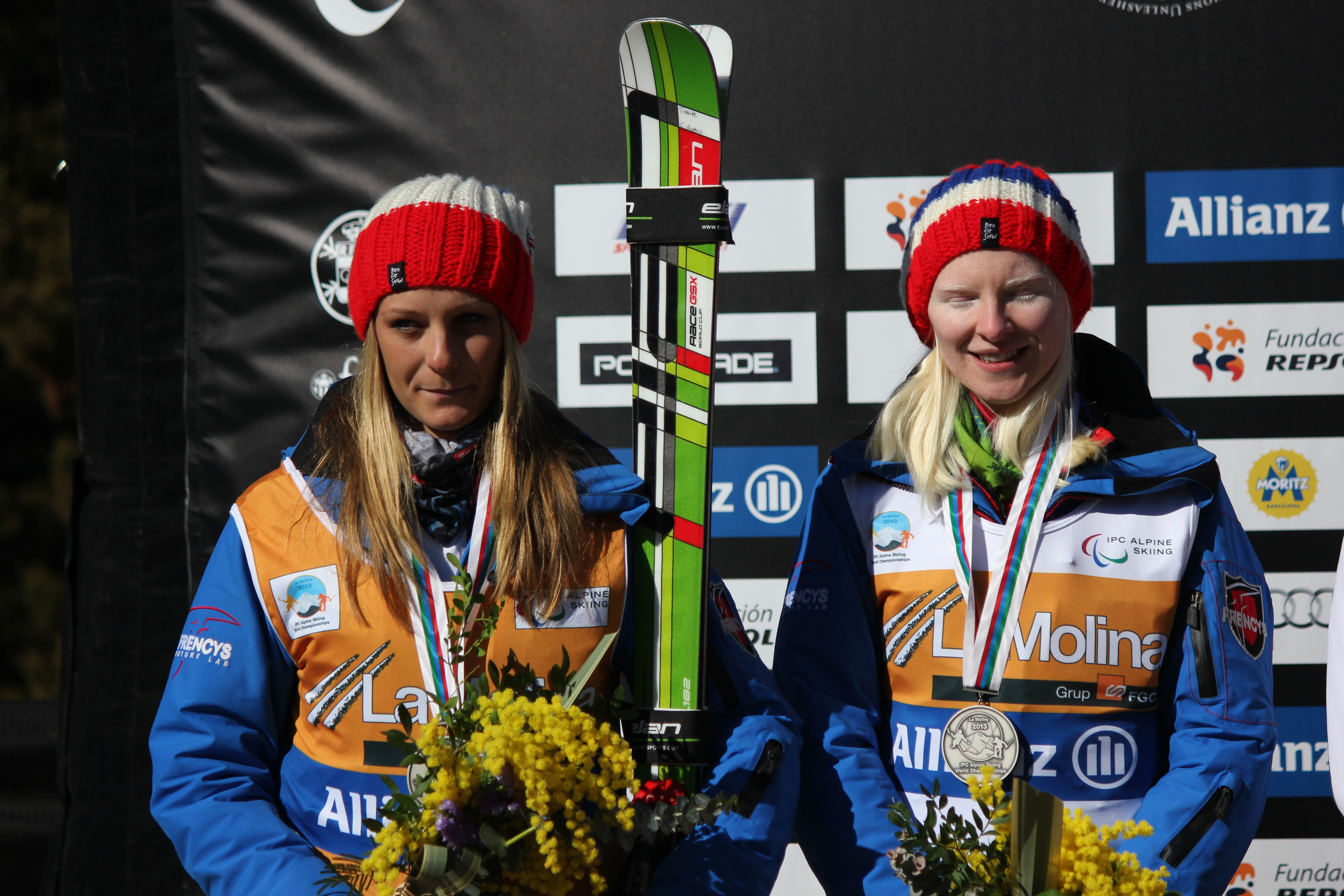
- Gallagher (right) with her guide Charlotte Evans at the 2013 IPC World Championships

Personal information
- Full name: Kelly Marie Gallagher
- National team: Great Britain
- Born: 18 May 1985 (age 41) Bangor

Sport
- Country: United Kingdom
- Event: Alpine Skiing
Medal record
Women's para alpine skiing
Representing United Kingdom
Paralympic Games
Gold medal – first place	2014 Sochi	Super-G
World Championships
Silver medal – second place	2011 Sestriere	Slalom
Silver medal – second place	2013 La Molina	Super-G
Silver medal – second place	2013 La Molina	Super combined
Silver medal – second place	2019 Sella Nevea/Kranjska Gora	Downhill
Bronze medal – third place	2011 Sestriere	Giant slalom
Bronze medal – third place	2013 La Molina	Downhill
Bronze medal – third place	2013 La Molina	Giant slalom
Bronze medal – third place	2019 Sella Nevea/Kranjska Gora	Super-G
Bronze medal – third place	2019 Sella Nevea/Kranjska Gora	Super combined

Kelly Gallagher MBE (born 18 May 1985), is a retired Irish skier and the first athlete from Northern Ireland to compete in the Winter Paralympics. Gallagher won the UK’s first ever Winter Paralympic gold medal during Sochi 2014.

== Childhood ==
Kelly was born on 18 May 1985 and was raised in Bangor in the north of County Down. Her father, Patrick Gallagher, was an airline pilot. She is a graduate in mathematics from the University of Bath.

== Pre-Paralympics ==
Kelly has oculocutaneous albinism, is visually impaired and competes with a sighted guide. At the 2009 New Zealand Winter Games Gallagher, competing with guide Claire Robb, won gold in her first ever international race, the giant slalom.

She was selected for the British team at the 2010 Winter Paralympics in February 2010. Gallagher is funded by the Sport Northern Ireland Athlete Support Programme and supported by the Sports Institute for Northern Ireland and is also backed by Disability Sports NI.

== 2010 Paralympics ==
Kelly was one of seven skiers for Great Britain at the 2010 Winter Paralympics and became the first athlete from Northern Ireland to compete in the Winter Paralympics. At the Games she contested the giant slalom and slalom events for visually impaired athletes. She finished sixth in the slalom but achieved the British team's highest finish, missing out on a medal by a single place and 3.36 seconds in the giant slalom.

== Between Paralympics ==
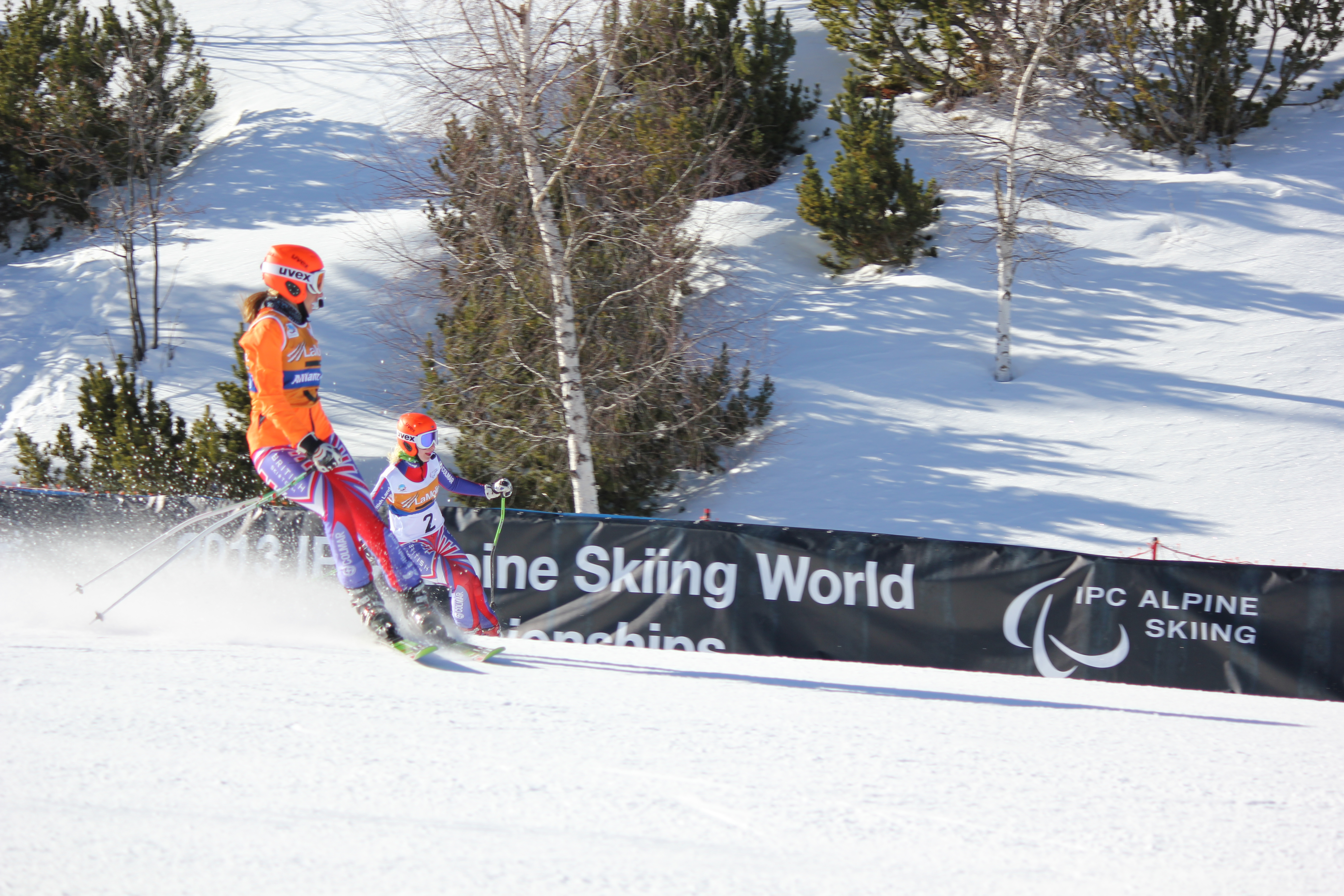
Downhill final of the 2013 IPC Alpine World Championships at La Molina in Spain. Kelly Gallagher (white tunic) and guide Charlotte Evans (orange tunic)

Following the Paralympics Gallagher sought a new sighted guide to work with her through to the 2014 Winter Paralympics in Sochi and selected 19-year-old Charlotte Evans from Medway. Evans had been out of the sport after she snapped a cruciate ligament in 2009 but took up the role having become a qualified coach.

In January 2011 Gallagher became the first British athlete to win a medal at the IPC World Championships. Competing with Evans the pair won the silver medal in the slalom and bronze in the giant slalom at the event held in Sestriere only five weeks after they started working together. The pairing also won a gold medal in slalom at the 2011 Europa Cup Finals.

== 2014 Paralympics ==
Gallagher won Britain's first ever Winter Paralympic gold on 10 March 2014, during the 2014 Winter Paralympics in Sochi, Russia. She finished first in the visually impaired Super-G competition. She fell during both the super-combined and the giant slalom.

She was appointed Member of the Order of the British Empire (MBE) in the 2014 Birthday Honours for services to sport for people with a visual impairment. The Ski Club of Great Britain awarded her with a Pery Medal along with the other medal winners from the 2014 Olympics and Paralympics.

== 2017 World Championships and 2018 Paralympics ==
In 2017 Gallagher was selected for the 2017 World Para Alpine Skiing Championships in Tarvisio in Italy. Partnered with Gary Smith, she crashed during training on the championship slopes and injured herself after colliding into the safety netting. She sustained a dislocated elbow and three fractured ribs in the accident and was airlifted to a local hospital. Gallagher's injuries ruled her out of the championship and her subsequent rehabilitation meant that she only returned to the slopes in the season leading up to the 2018 Winter Paralympics. Despite losing time to her injuries Gallagher was still able to secure her place in the Great Britain team for the 2018 Paralympics.

== 2019 World Championships ==
At the 2019 World Para Alpine Skiing Championships, Gallagher and Smith narrowly missed out on medals in the slalom and the giant slalom by finishing fourth, being pipped to the bronze by a tenth of a second in the latter by team-mates Menna Fitzpatrick and Jennifer Kehoe. However they claimed their first medal of the championships in the downhill, where they took a silver behind Fitzpatrick and Kehoe. They then went on to take two bronzes in the super-G and combined, increasing Gallagher's number of Worlds medals won to nine.
