= Austria at the 2018 Winter Paralympics =

Austria sent competitors the 2018 Winter Paralympics in Pyeongchang, South Korea. Austria sent 13 people to compete in three sports: para-alpine skiing, para-snowboarding, and cross-country skiing.

== Team ==
Austria sent 13 people to compete in three sports: para-alpine skiing, para-snowboarding, and cross-country skiing.

The table below contains the list of members of people (called "Team Austria") that participated in the 2018 Games.

Team Austria
Name	Sport	Gender	Classification	Events	ref
Heike Eder	para-alpine skiing	male	sitting	slalom, giant slalom	
Carina Edlinger	para-Nordic skiing	female		cross country skiing	
Julian Edlinger	para-Nordic skiing	male	guide skier	cross country skiing	
Markus Gfatterhofer	para-alpine skiing	male	sitting	slalom, giant slalom	
Thomas Grochar	para-alpine skiing	male	standing	super combined, Super-G, slalom, giant slalom	
Christoph Gmeiner	para-alpine skiing	male	guide skier	Super-G, super combined, slalom, giant slalom	
Claudia Lösch	para-alpine skiing	female	sitting	downhill, Super-G, super combined, slalom, giant slalom	
Patrick Mayrhofer	para-snowboarding	male		slalom, snowboard cross	
Gernot Morgenfurts	para-alpine skiing	male	vision impaired	Super-G, super combined, slalom, giant slalom	
Nico Pajantschitsch	para-alpine skiing	male	standing	downhill, Super-G, super combined, slalom, giant slalom	
Roman Rabl	para-alpine skiing	male	sitting	downhill, super combined, slalom, giant slalom	
Markus Salcher	para-alpine skiing	male		downhill, Super-G, super combined, giant slalom	
Reinhold Schett	para-snowboarding	male		slalom, snowboard cross	
Simon Wallner	para-alpine skiing	male	sitting	downhill, Super-G, super combined, slalom, giant slalom	
Martin Würz	para-alpine skiing	male	standing	super combined, Super-G, slalom, giant slalom	

Secretary General Petra Huber and Chef de Mission Julia Voglmayr traveled to South Korea for a meeting with the Chef de Missions of 32 other countries in March 2017, a year before the Games were scheduled to start.

== Medals and medalists ==
If someone from Austria wins a medal, they will get a cash reward of between €4000 and €8000.

== Para-alpine skiing ==
=== Skiers ===
Gernot Morgenfurts decided he wanted to start skiing after his multiple sclerosis became worse. He physically prepared himself before starting the sport in 2015. Later that year, he participated in the Austria Cup. Morgenfurts started competing internationally during the 2016/2017 World Cup season. Because of problems with his sight, he needs a guide skier. For the 2018 Games, that skier is Christoph Gmeiner. They use headsets to talk to each other during races. Pyeongchang 2018 is his first major international skiing competition.

Morgenfurts was diagnosed with multiple sclerosis 30 years before the start of the 2018 Games. As the disease has progressed, his vision has become worse.

Thomas Grochar is a standing skier. Grochar won silver at the end of 2016/2017 World Cup season.

=== Before the Games ===
Thomas Grochar went to Slovenia in January 2018. He competed in the World Cup in Kranjska Gora.

=== Schedule and results ===
The first event on the para-alpine program is the downhill. It starts on 10 March, running from 9:30 AM to 1:30 PM. Claudia Lösch, Markus Salcher, Nico Pajantschitsch, Roman Rabl and Simon Wallner are registered to start.

The second event on the program is Super-G. All skiers will race between 9:30 AM and 1:00 PM on 11 March. Claudia Lösch, Markus Salcher, Thomas Grochar, Martin Würz, Nico Pajantschitsch, Roman Rabl, Simon Wallner, Gernot Morgenfurt and guide Christoph Gmeiner should start in this event.

The super combined takes place on 13 March. The Super-G part of the event is in the morning. The slalom part is in the afternoon. Claudia Lösch, Markus Salcher, Thomas Grochar, Martin Würz, Nico Pajantschitsch, Roman Rabl, Simon Wallner, Gernot Morgenfurt and guide Christoph Gmeiner are scheduled to start.

The slalom event gets underway on 14 March and conclude on 15 March. Women and men both race during the same sessions in the morning. The afternoon sessions start with the women doing their second run. Then the men go. Claudia Lösch, Heike Eder, Thomas Grochar, Martin Würz, Nico Pajantschitsch, Roman Rabl, Markus Gfatterhofer, Simon Wallner, Gernot Morgenfurt and guide Christoph Gmeiner are registered to start in the slalom.

The last para-alpine skiing race of the 2018 Games is the giant slalom. It takes place on 17 - 18 March. Men and women both race at the same time in the morning sessions. Women race first in the afternoon sessions, with the men racing a half hour after they end. Claudia Lösch, Heike Eder, Markus Salcher, Thomas Grochar, Martin Würz, Nico Pajantschitsch, Roman Rabl, Markus Gfatterhofer, Simon Wallner, Gernot Morgenfurt and his guide Christoph Gmeiner should all start in this event.

== Para-Nordic skiing ==
=== Skiers ===
Carina is blind. Her brother, Julian, is her guide skier. She first competed for Austria in 2016. At the 2017 World Championships in Finsterau, Germany, Carina won 2 gold medals and 1 bronze medal. Carina was awarded the Golden Lion as "Rookie of the Year" at the Leonidas Sports Gala 2017.

=== Schedule and results ===
On 12 March, the 15 km race takes place, with standing and vision impaired women starting at 10:00 PM. Carina Edlinger and guide Julian Edlinger are scheduled to start. The pair are then scheduled to start in the sprint classic qualification. It takes place on 14 March from 10:00 AM - 11:25 AM for both men and women in all classes. It is followed in the afternoon by the semifinals and finals. The classic race takes place on 17 March. Carina Edlinger and guide Julian Edlinger are scheduled to participate in the 7.5 km race. The standing and visually impaired women's race takes place from 10:00 AM - 12:30.

== Para-snowboarding ==
=== Schedule and results ===
Patrick Mayrhofer and Reinhold Schett are scheduled to start in the snowboard cross event. The program has the race starting on 12 March, running from 10:30 AM to 5:00 PM for all classes for both men and women. The slalom race is scheduled to take place on 16 March, going from 10:30 AM - 4:55 PM for men and women in all classes. Patrick Mayrhofer and Reinhold Schett are both scheduled to start.

== Social space ==
Austria, Switzerland and Germany are co-hosting "Alpenhaus" in Pyeongchang. It is a place where people can celebrate winning Paralympic medals.
