= Alana Ramsay =

Canadian para-alpine skier (born 1994)

Personal information
- Nationality: Canadian
- Born: December 22, 1994 (age 31)

Sport
- Country: Canada
- Sport: Para-alpine skiing
- Disability class: LW9
Medal record
Women's para-alpine skiing
Representing Canada
Winter Paralympics
Bronze medal – third place	2018 Pyeongchang	Super combined standing
Bronze medal – third place	2018 Pyeongchang	Super-G standing
Bronze medal – third place	2022 Beijing	Super-G standing
Bronze medal – third place	2022 Beijing	Super combined standing

Alana Ramsay (born December 22, 1994) is a Canadian paralympic alpine skier, born in Calgary, Alberta. Ramsay, who was born with cerebral palsy due to a stroke at birth, started skiing at age 6. On the Para-Alpine World Cup circuit in 2015/16, she landed her first podium. In both 2016 and 2017, Ramsay was named Canadian Ski Racing Female Para Alpine Athlete of the Year. Ramsay has competed in 3 Paralympic games thus far, she won bronze medals at the Pyeongchang 2018 Winter Paralympics in both the super-G and super combined events. In the 2022 Beijing Winter Paralympics, Ramsay won two more bronze medals, in the super combined standing and super-G standing events.

In 2022. Ramsay announced her retirement ahead of the 2022-23 race season.
