= Para alpine skiing at the 2026 Winter Paralympics – Men's giant slalom =

Men's giant slalom at the XIV Paralympic Winter Games
- Paralympic alpine skiing
- Venue: Tofane Alpine Skiing Centre
- Dates: 13 March

Men's giant slalom (visually impaired) at the XIV Paralympic Winter Games
- Competitors: 19 from 13 nations

Medalists
1st place, gold medalist(s)		Johannes Aigner; Guide: Nico Haberl	Austria
2nd place, silver medalist(s)		Giacomo Bertagnolli; Guide: Andrea Ravelli	Italy
3rd place, bronze medalist(s)		Michał Gołaś; Guide: Kacper Walas	Poland

Men's giant slalom (standing) at the XIV Paralympic Winter Games
- Competitors: 40 from 22 nations

Medalists
1st place, gold medalist(s)		Arthur Bauchet	France
2nd place, silver medalist(s)		Robin Cuche	Switzerland
3rd place, bronze medalist(s)		Alexey Bugaev	Russia

Men's giant slalom (sitting) at the XIV Paralympic Winter Games
- Competitors: 37 from 24 nations

Medalists
1st place, gold medalist(s)		René De Silvestro	Italy
2nd place, silver medalist(s)		Niels de Langen	Netherlands
3rd place, bronze medalist(s)		Jesper Pedersen	Norway

The Men's giant slalom competition of the 2026 Winter Paralympics was held on 13 March 2026 at the Tofane Alpine Skiing Centre.

== Medal table ==
* Host nation (Italy)

Rank	Nation	Gold	Silver	Bronze	Total
1	Italy (ITA)*	1	1	0	2
2	Austria (AUT)	1	0	0	1
2	France (FRA)	1	0	0	1
4	Netherlands (NED)	0	1	0	1
4	Switzerland (SUI)	0	1	0	1
6	Norway (NOR)	0	0	1	1
6	Poland (POL)	0	0	1	1
6	Russia (RUS)	0	0	1	1
Totals (8 entries)		3	3	3	9

== Visually impaired ==
In the giant slalom visually impaired, the athlete with a visual impairement has a sighted guide. The two skiers are considered a team, and dual medals are awarded.

Rank	Bib	Name	Country	Run 1	Rank	Run 2	Rank	Total	Difference
1st place, gold medalist(s)	6	Johannes Aigner; Guide: Nico Haberl	Austria	1:03.22	2	1:04.61	1	2:07.83	
2nd place, silver medalist(s)	1	Giacomo Bertagnolli; Guide: Andrea Ravelli	Italy	1:02.76	1	1:05.41	2	2:08.17	+0.34
3rd place, bronze medalist(s)	4	Michał Gołaś; Guide: Kacper Walas	Poland	1:04.30	4	1:05.61	3	2:09.91	+2.08
4	5	Kalle Ericsson; Guide: Sierra Smith	Canada	1:03.69	3	1:06.34	4	2:10.03	+2.20
5	15	Wang Xingdong; Guide: Chen Zhicheng	China	1:08.18	5	1:11.24	7	2:19.42	+11.59
6	8	Hwang Min-gyu; Guide: Kim Jun-hyeong	South Korea	1:08.94	6	1:11.22	6	2:20.16	+12.33
7	9	Michael Scharnagl; Guide: Lilly Sammer	Austria	1:09.85	7	1:10.33	5	2:20.18	+12.35
8	3	Marek Kubačka; Guide: Mária Zaťovičová	Slovakia	1:12.23	9	1:11.41	8	2:23.64	+15.81
9	12	Tadeáš Kříž; Guide: Iva Křížová	Czech Republic	1:14.95	13	1:13.19	9	2:28.14	+20.31
10	14	Maximilien Seeger; Guide: Jeremy Mestdagh	Belgium	1:12.22	8	1:16.36	11	2:28.58	+20.75
11	11	Alexander Rauen; Guide: Jeremias Wilke	Germany	1:14.23	12	1:16.08	10	2:30.31	+22.48
12	16	Fred Warburton; Guide: James Hannan	Great Britain	1:20.19	14	1:18.78	12	2:38.97	+31.14
13	18	Petar Kordić; Guide: Marija Coch	Croatia	1:23.29	15	1:20.88	13	2:44.17	+36.34
14	19	Patrik Hetmer; Guide: Miroslav Máčala	Czech Republic	1:32.64	16	1:31.05	14	3:03.69	+55.86
	13	Dong Yiheng; Guide: Che Hang	China	1:13.02	10	DNF		—	
	17	Sam Cozens; Guide: Adam Hall	Great Britain	1:14.07	11	DNF		—	
	2	Neil Simpson; Guide: Rob Poth	Great Britain	DNF		—			
	7	Hyacinthe Deleplace; Guide: Perrine Clair	France	DNF		—			
	10	Miroslav Haraus; Guide: Maroš Hudík	Slovakia	DNF		—			

== Standing ==
Rank	Bib	Name	Country	Run 1	Rank	Run 2	Rank	Total	Difference
1st place, gold medalist(s)	22	Arthur Bauchet	France	1:04.07	1	1:03.69	1	2:07.76	
2nd place, silver medalist(s)	21	Robin Cuche	Switzerland	1:04.36	2	1:05.36	2	2:09.72	+1.96
3rd place, bronze medalist(s)	60	Alexey Bugaev	Russia	1:05.71	3	1:05.43	3	2:11.14	+3.38
4	29	Federico Pelizzari	Italy	1:06.43	4	1:06.30	4	2:12.73	+4.97
5	26	Jules Segers	France	1:06.62	6	1:06.87	5	2:13.49	+5.73
6	20	Jordan Broisin	France	1:08.68	8	1:07.69	6	2:16.37	+8.61
7	24	Oscar Burnham	France	1:08.92	10	1:07.72	7	2:16.64	+8.88
8	30	Nico Pajantschitsch	Austria	1:09.18	11	1:07.76	8	2:16.94	+9.18
9	27	Emerick Sierro	Switzerland	1:09.37	12	1:08.35	9	2:17.72	+9.96
10	25	Théo Gmür	Switzerland	1:08.13	7	1:09.66	12	2:17.79	+10.03
11	28	Luca Palla	Italy	1:08.90	9	1:09.12	10	2:18.02	+10.26
12	39	Markus Salcher	Austria	1:10.01	14	1:09.32	11	2:19.33	+11.57
13	34	Jesse Keefe	United States	1:09.96	13	1:09.74	13	2:19.70	+11.94
14	35	Gakuta Koike	Japan	1:11.82	15	1:11.00	14	2:22.82	+15.06
15	41	Roger Puig	Andorra	1:12.25	16	1:11.50	15	2:23.75	+15.99
16	52	Bernt Marius Rørstad	Norway	1:12.46	17	1:12.97	16	2:25.43	+17.67
17	38	Marcus Grasto Nilsson	Norway	1:13.01	20	1:13.01	17	2:26.02	+18.26
18	37	Manuel Rachbauer	Austria	1:12.77	18	1:13.69	19	2:26.46	+18.70
19	42	Tyler McKenzie	United States	1:12.94	19	1:14.81	21	2:27.75	+19.99
20	47	Arvid Skoglund	Sweden	1:15.02	22	1:13.04	18	2:28.06	+20.30
21	43	Li Biao	China	1:13.98	21	1:15.56	22	2:29.54	+21.78
22	51	Adam Hall	New Zealand	1:15.38	23	1:14.67	20	2:30.05	+22.29
23	46	Tomáš Vaverka	Czech Republic	1:17.21	24	1:16.57	23	2:33.78	+26.02
24	53	Martin Čupka	Slovakia	1:18.04	25	1:18.43	24	2:36.47	+28.71
25	55	Dominic Allen	Great Britain	1:20.66	27	1:20.69	25	2:41.35	+33.59
26	48	Ueli Rotach	Switzerland	1:23.05	28	1:24.65	26	2:47.70	+39.94
27	56	Maksym Heliuta	Ukraine	1:28.30	29	1:25.17	27	2:53.47	+45.71
28	50	Michael O'Hearn	United States	1:29.88	30	1:28.90	28	2:58.78	+51.02
29	57	Firdavs Khudoyatov	Uzbekistan	1:32.12	31	1:35.20	31	3:07.32	+59.56
30	58	Byambadorjiin Tserenpuntsag	Mongolia	1:36.72	33	1:34.29	29	3:11.01	+1:03.25
31	54	Luka Bilčar	Serbia	1:36.65	32	1:34.53	30	3:11.18	+1:03.42
	23	Alexis Guimond	Canada	1:06.45	5	DNF		—	
	59	Ralf Étienne	Haiti	1:37.33	34	DSQ		—	
	44	Yan Gong	China	1:18.33	26	DNS		—	
	31	Davide Bendotti	Italy	DNF		—			
	32	Thomas Grochar	Austria	DNF		—			
	33	Christoph Glötzner	Germany	DNF		—			
	36	Patrick Halgren	United States	DNF		—			
	40	Spencer Wood	United States	DNF		—			
	49	Sun Hongsheng	China	DNF		—			
	45	Michael Milton	Australia	DNS		—			

== Sitting ==
Rank	Bib	Name	Country	Run 1	Rank	Run 2	Rank	Total	Difference
1st place, gold medalist(s)	64	René De Silvestro	Italy	1:05.56	1	1:04.88	2	2:10.44	
2nd place, silver medalist(s)	65	Niels de Langen	Netherlands	1:06.40	2	1:04.61	1	2:11.01	+0.57
3rd place, bronze medalist(s)	62	Jesper Pedersen	Norway	1:07.78	3	1:06.81	3	2:14.59	+4.15
4	72	Takeshi Suzuki	Japan	1:08.44	4	1:09.60	6	2:18.04	+7.60
5	70	Corey Peters	New Zealand	1:08.64	5	1:09.48	5	2:18.12	+7.68
6	69	Nicolás Bisquertt	Chile	1:08.86	6	1:09.27	4	2:18.13	+7.69
7	63	Taiki Morii	Japan	1:10.67	8	1:09.87	7	2:20.54	+10.10
8	75	Pascal Christen	Switzerland	1:10.77	9	1:11.93	8	2:22.70	+12.26
9	85	Jernej Slivnik	Slovenia	1:11.03	10	1:15.46	15	2:26.49	+16.05
10	77	Josh Hanlon	Australia	1:12.61	13	1:14.68	10	2:27.29	+16.85
11	84	Thijn Speksnijder	Netherlands	1:12.39	12	1:15.17	13	2:27.56	+17.12
12	83	Matthew Ryan Brewer	United States	1:13.03	14	1:14.75	11	2:27.78	+17.34
13	86	Christophe Damas	Switzerland	1:15.57	16	1:12.74	9	2:28.31	+17.87
14	87	Dino Sokolović	Croatia	1:15.19	15	1:14.98	12	2:30.17	+19.73
15	78	Ravi Drugan	United States	1:11.49	11	1:19.34	18	2:30.83	+20.39
16	81	Li Xiang	China	1:18.30	18	1:15.36	14	2:33.66	+23.22
17	80	Brian Rowland	Canada	1:20.13	20	1:15.64	16	2:35.77	+25.33
18	90	Sebastian Rigby	Austria	1:19.35	19	1:18.80	17	2:38.15	+27.71
19	93	Petr Drahoš	Czech Republic	1:20.97	21	1:24.04	19	2:45.01	+34.57
	73	Magnus Valø Balchen	Norway	1:10.07	7	DNF		—	
	76	Victor Pierrel	France	1:15.59	17	DNF		—	
	97	Orlando Pérez	Puerto Rico	1:47.96	22	DNF		—	
	61	Kurt Oatway	Canada	DNF		—			
	66	Andrew Kurka	United States	DNF		—			
	67	Jeroen Kampschreur	Netherlands	DNF		—			
	68	Liang Zilu	China	DNF		—			
	71	Lou Braz-Dagand	France	DNF		—			
	74	Enrique Plantey	Argentina	DNF		—			
	79	Robert Enigl	United States	DNF		—			
	82	Chen Liang	China	DNF		—			
	88	Jasmin Bambur	United States	DNF		—			
	89	Javier Arteaga	Spain	DNF		—			
	91	Leon Gensert	Germany	DNF		—			
	92	Jérémie Prégardien	Belgium	DNF		—			
	94	Lee Hwan-kyung	South Korea	DNF		—			
	95	Elijah Primak	Sweden	DNF		—			
	96	Adam Nybo	Denmark	DNF		—			

== See also ==
- Alpine skiing at the 2026 Winter Olympics
