= World Para Alpine Skiing World Cup =

Annual alpine skiing competition

The World Para Alpine Skiing World Cup (previously called the IPC Alpine Skiing World Cup) is an annual circuit of elite disabled alpine skiing competitions, regulated by the International Paralympic Committee (IPC) and the International Ski Federation (FIS).

Held at ski areas across Europe, North America, and East Asia, the World Cup consists of timed races in five disciplines: slalom, giant slalom, super G, downhill, and super combined. Medals are awarded to the top three men's and women's finishers in each of the three disability categories: standing, sitting, and visually impaired. After each race, points are awarded to the top 30 skiers in each disability category who finish within a certain percentage of the winning time. 100 points are awarded to the winner, 80 for second place, 60 for third, and so on, down to one point for 30th place. In each disability category, the male and female athlete with the most points at the end of the season wins the overall World Cup title and a large glass trophy, the crystal globe. Smaller globes are also awarded for athletes with the highest point totals in each of the five disciplines. Additionally, a Nations Cup trophy is awarded to the country that accumulates the highest point total.

The World Cup is held every year, and is considered one of the premier competitions in disabled ski racing, along with the Winter Paralympics (held every four years, concurrently with the Winter Olympics) and the World Championships (held every two years since 2009, but irregularly before that).

Disabled ski racers who aspire one day to compete on the World Cup attempt to qualify on one of the Continental Cup circuits: the Europa Cup (or "European Cup") in Europe and the Nor-Am Cup in North America.

== History ==
Although disabled ski competitions date to the mid-20th century and the first Winter Paralympics were held in 1976, the Disabled Alpine World Cup is relatively new. An unofficial circuit began in the late 1990s, and the first FIS-sanctioned World Cup race was held in Breckenridge, Colorado, United States in December 1999, with the first World Cup titles awarded in the spring of 2000. In 2004, the administration of the World Cup circuit, and disabled ski racing in general, passed from the FIS to the IPC, although the FIS is still involved in some aspects of the tour. For example, a FIS technical delegate still oversees each race.

== Winners ==
=== Men ===
Year	Sitting skiers	Standing skiers	Visually impaired skiers
1999–2000			
2000–01			
2001–02			
2002–03			
2003–04			
2004–05	(Germany) Martin Braxenthaler	(Germany) Gerd Schönfelder	(France) Nicola Berejny
2005–06	(Germany) Martin Braxenthaler	(Germany) Gerd Schönfelder	(Canada) Chris Williamson
2006–07			
2007–08			
2008–09			
2009–10	(Germany) Martin Braxenthaler		(Canada) Chris Williamson
2010–11	(Austria) Philipp Bonadimann	(France) Vincent Gauthier-Manuel	(Spain) Yon Santacana Maiztegui
2011–12	(Japan) Taiki Morii	(France) Vincent Gauthier-Manuel	(Russia) Valerii Redkozubov
2012–13	(Japan) Takeshi Suzuki	(Russia) Aleksei Bugaev	(Spain) Yon Santacana Maiztegui
2013–14	(United States) Tyler Walker	(Russia) Aleksei Bugaev	(Italy) Alessandro Daldoss
2014–15	(Japan) Takeshi Suzuki	(Russia) Aleksei Bugaev	(Canada) Mac Marcoux
2015–16	(Japan) Taiki Morii	(Russia) Aleksei Bugaev	(Italy) Giacomo Bertagnolli
2016–17	(Japan) Taiki Morii	(Austria) Markus Salcher	(Slovakia) Miroslav Haraus
2017–18	(Norway) Jesper Pedersen	(Switzerland) Theo Gmur	(Canada) Mac Marcoux
2018–19	(Norway) Jesper Pedersen	(France) Arthur Bauchet	(Slovakia) Miroslav Haraus
2019–20	(Norway) Jesper Pedersen	(France) Arthur Bauchet	(Italy) Giacomo Bertagnolli
2020–21	(Norway) Jesper Pedersen	(France) Arthur Bauchet	(France) Hyacinthe Deleplace
2021–22			

=== Women ===
Year	Sitting skiers	Standing skiers	Visually impaired skiers
1999–2000			
2000–01			
2001–02			
2002–03			
2003–04			
2004–05	(United States) Laurie Stephens	(Slovakia) Iveta Chlebakova	(France) Pascale Casanova
2005–06	(United States) Laurie Stephens	(Canada) Lauren Woolstencroft	(Austria) Sabine Gasteiger
2006-07			
2007–08			
2008–09			
2009–10	(Austria) Claudia Loesch		(United States) Danelle Umstead
2010–11	(Austria) Claudia Loesch	(France) Marie Bochet	(Russia) Aleksandra Frantseva
2011–12	(Germany) Anna Schaffelhuber	(France) Marie Bochet	(Slovakia) Henrieta Farkasova
2012–13	(Germany) Anna Schaffelhuber	(Germany) Andrea Rothfuss	(Russia) Aleksandra Frantseva
2013–14	(Germany) Anna Schaffelhuber	(France) Marie Bochet	(United States) Danelle Umstead
2014–15	(Germany) Anna Schaffelhuber	(France) Marie Bochet	(United States) Danelle Umstead
2015–16	(Germany) Anna-Lena Forster	(France) Marie Bochet	(United Kingdom) Menna Fitzpatrick
2016–17	(Germany) Anna Schaffelhuber	(Germany) Andrea Rothfuss	(Slovakia) Henrieta Farkasova
2017–18	(Austria) Claudia Loesch	(France) Marie Bochet	(Slovakia) Henrieta Farkasova
2018–19	(Japan) Momoka Muraoka	(France) Marie Bochet	(United Kingdom) Menna Fitzpatrick
2019–20	(United States) Laurie Stephens	(France) Marie Bochet	(Germany) Noemi Ewa Ristau
2020–21	(Germany) Anna-Lena Forster	(Russia) Varvara Voronchikhina	(Slovakia) Alexandra Rexova
2021–22			

=== Nations Cup ===
Nations Cup winners
Year	Overall	Women	Men
1999–2000	United States		
2000–01	United States		
2001–02	United States		
2002–03	Austria		
2003–04	United States		
2004–05	United States		
2005–06	Austria		
2006-07			
2007–08			
2008–09			
2009–10	United States		
2010–11	France		
2011–12	United States		
2012–13	Russia		
2013–14	United States	United States	Russia
2014–15	Russia	Germany	Russia
2015–16	United States	United States	Russia
2016–17	United States	Germany	Austria
2017–18	United States	Germany	United States
2018-19	France	Germany	France
2019-20	Russia	Germany	France
2020-21	France	Germany	France
2021-22			
