= Alpine skiing at the 2022 Winter Paralympics – Men's downhill =

Men's downhill at the XIII Paralympic Winter Games
- Paralympic alpine skiing
- Venue: Yanqing National Alpine Skiing Centre
- Dates: 5 March 2022

Men's downhill (visually impaired) at the XIII Paralympic Winter Games
- Competitors: 10 from 7 nations

Medalists
1st place, gold medalist(s)		Johannes Aigner	Austria
2nd place, silver medalist(s)		Mac Marcoux	Canada
3rd place, bronze medalist(s)		Hyacinthe Deleplace	France

Men's downhill (standing) at the XIII Paralympic Winter Games
- Competitors: 32 from 17 nations

Medalists
1st place, gold medalist(s)		Arthur Bauchet	France
2nd place, silver medalist(s)		Markus Salcher	Austria
3rd place, bronze medalist(s)		Théo Gmür	Switzerland

Men's downhill (sitting) at the XIII Paralympic Winter Games
- Competitors: 25 from 8 nations

Medalists
1st place, gold medalist(s)		Corey Peters	New Zealand
2nd place, silver medalist(s)		Jesper Pedersen	Norway
3rd place, bronze medalist(s)		Taiki Morii	Japan

The men's downhill competition of the 2022 Winter Paralympics was held at the Yanqing National Alpine Skiing Centre on 5 March 2022.

== Medal table ==
Rank	Nation	Gold	Silver	Bronze	Total
1	Austria (AUT)	1	1	0	2
2	France (FRA)	1	0	1	2
3	New Zealand (NZL)	1	0	0	1
4	Canada (CAN)	0	1	0	1
4	Norway (NOR)	0	1	0	1
6	Japan (JPN)	0	0	1	1
6	Switzerland (SUI)	0	0	1	1
Totals (7 entries)		3	3	3	9

== Visually impaired ==
In the downhill visually impaired, the athlete with a visual impairment has a sighted guide. The two skiers are considered a team, and dual medals are awarded.

Rank	Bib	Name	Country	Time	Difference
1st place, gold medalist(s)	3	Johannes Aigner; Guide: Matteo Fleischmann	Austria	1:13.45	–
2nd place, silver medalist(s)	1	Mac Marcoux; Guide: Tristan Rodgers	Canada	1:13.81	0.36
3rd place, bronze medalist(s)	2	Hyacinthe Deleplace; Guide: Valentin Giraud Moine	France	1:14.10	0.65
4	4	Miroslav Haraus; Guide: Maros Hudik	Slovakia	1:16.01	2.56
5	6	Jakub Krako; Guide: Branislav Brozman	Slovakia	1:16.09	2.64
6	5	Giacomo Bertagnolli; Guide: Andrea Ravelli	Italy	1:17.05	3.60
7	7	Neil Simpson; Guide: Andrew Simpson	Great Britain	1:17.13	3.68
8	10	Patrick Jensen; Guide: Amelia Hodgson	Australia	1:23.71	10.26
9	9	Logan Leach; Guide: Julien Petit	Canada	1:26.28	12.83
	8	Michael Scharnagl; Guide: Florian Erharter	Austria	DNS	

== Standing ==
Rank	Bib	Name	Country	Time	Difference
1st place, gold medalist(s)	12	Arthur Bauchet	France	1:14.92	–
2nd place, silver medalist(s)	14	Markus Salcher	Austria	1:15.25	0.33
3rd place, bronze medalist(s)	16	Théo Gmür	Switzerland	1:16.17	1.25
4	40	Liang Jingyi	China	1:16.36	1.44
5	18	Alexis Guimond	Canada	1:16.77	1.85
6	13	Aaron Lindström	Sweden	1:18.21	3.29
7	21	Manoel Bourdenx	France	1:18.49	3.57
8	23	Santeri Kiiveri	Finland	1:18.92	4.00
9	28	James Whitley	Great Britain	1:19.05	4.13
10	19	Nico Pajantschitsch	Austria	1:19.21	4.29
11	11	Robin Cuche	Switzerland	1:19.55	4.63
12	29	Federico Pelizzari	Italy	1:19.73	4.81
13	17	Jordan Broisin	France	1:20.18	5.26
14	25	Hiraku Misawa	Japan	1:20.20	5.28
15	24	Andrew Haraghey	United States	1:20.25	5.33
16	33	Spencer Wood	United States	1:20.55	5.63
17	31	Jeffrey Stuut	Netherlands	1:20.89	5.97
18	30	Oscar Burnham	France	1:21.07	6.15
19	34	Adam Hall	New Zealand	1:21.18	6.26
20	15	Mitchell Gourley	Australia	1:22.21	7.29
21	26	Gakuta Koike	Japan	1:22.46	7.54
22	36	Jesse Keefe	United States	1:22.48	7.56
23	22	Christoph Bernhard Schneider	Austria	1:22.73	7.81
24	42	Li Biao	China	1:23.07	8.15
25	38	Sun Yanlong	China	1:23.12	8.20
26	32	Arvid Skoglund	Sweden	1:23.15	8.23
27	41	Niu Shaojie	China	1:23.48	8.56
28	27	Connor Hogan	United States	1:23.89	8.97
29	20	Roger Puig	Andorra	1:25.17	10.25
30	39	Sun Hongsheng	China	1:28.00	13.08
31	37	Tyler Carter	United States	1:28.78	13.86
	35	Leander Kress	Germany	DNF	

== Sitting ==
Rank	Bib	Name	Country	Time	Difference
1st place, gold medalist(s)	47	Corey Peters	New Zealand	1:16.73	–
2nd place, silver medalist(s)	43	Jesper Pedersen	Norway	1:17.99	1.26
3rd place, bronze medalist(s)	49	Taiki Morii	Japan	1:18.29	1.56
4	48	Andrew Kurka	United States	1:18.37	1.64
5	44	Jeroen Kampschreur	Netherlands	1:19.08	2.35
6	51	Niels de Langen	Netherlands	1:20.29	3.56
7	45	Akira Kano	Japan	1:20.58	3.85
8	46	Takeshi Suzuki	Japan	1:22.84	6.11
9	66	Yan Hailing	China	1:23.74	7.01
10	64	Liang Zilu	China	1:23.99	7.26
11	58	Aaron Ewen	New Zealand	1:26.33	9.60
12	55	Han Sang-min	South Korea	1:26.69	9.96
13	63	Li Xiang	China	1:28.86	12.13
14	60	Chen Liang	China	1:33.08	16.35
	50	Sam Tait	Australia	DNF	
	52	Floris Meijer	Netherlands	DNF	
	54	Ravi Drugan	United States	DNF	
	56	Pascal Christen	Switzerland	DNF	
	59	Gong Zhaolin	China	DNF	
	61	Nicolás Bisquertt	Chile	DNF	
	62	Pavel Bambousek	Czech Republic	DNF	
	65	Enrique Plantey	Argentina	DNF	
	67	Roman Rabl	Austria	DNF	
	57	Brian Rowland	Canada	DSQ	
	53	Murat Pelit	Switzerland	DNS	

== See also ==
- Alpine skiing at the 2022 Winter Olympics
