= Russia at the 2026 Winter Paralympics =

- IPC code: RUS
- NPC: Russian Paralympic Committee
- Website: www.paralymp.ru (in Russian)

in Milan and Cortina d'Ampezzo, Italy 6–15 March 2026
- Competitors: 6 (4 men and 2 women) in 3 sports
- Flag bearers (opening): Alexey Bugaev & Anastasiia Bagiian
- Flag bearers (closing): Ivan Golubkov & Varvara Voronchikhina
- Medals Ranked 3rd: Gold 8 Silver 1 Bronze 3 Total 12

Winter Paralympics appearances (overview)
- 1994; 1998; 2002; 2006; 2010; 2014; 2018–2022; 2026

Other related appearances
- Soviet Union (1988); Unified Team (1992); Neutral Paralympic Athletes (2018)

Russia competed at the 2026 Winter Paralympics in Milan and Cortina d'Ampezzo, Italy, between 6 and 15 March 2026. It was Russia's first appearance at the Winter Paralympics under its own flag since 2014, and the country's first appearance at the Paralympics as a whole since 2018.

== Background ==
The Russian Paralympic Committee remained suspended from the Paralympic movement since 2016, due to the state-sponsored doping programme scandal, but the International Paralympic Committee allowed athletes deemed clean to participate in five sports at 2018 Winter Paralympics in Pyeongchang, South Korea: they participated under the Paralympic flag, and the Paralympic anthem was used during ceremonies for those who won gold medals.

On 24 February 2022, the first day of the Russian invasion of Ukraine, the International Olympic Committee condemned the breach of the Olympic Truce (which lasts from the beginning of the Olympics through the end of the Paralympics) by Russia and Belarus. On 28 February 2022, the IOC Executive Board further called for Russian and Belarusian athletes not to be included in or allowed to participate in any international sporting event. On 2 March 2022, the IPC declared that Russian and Belarusian athletes would be included independently under or allowed to participate independently under the Paralympic flag, with their results not counting in the medal standings.

As a result of criticism by several National Paralympic Committees, who threatened to boycott the Games, the IPC announced on 3 March 2022 that they would reverse their earlier decision, banning Russian and Belarusian athletes from competing at the 2022 Winter Paralympics. The 83 Russian and Belarusian athletes competing in the Games were asked to leave the Olympic Village: among them, 71 Russian athletes were expected to compete in 61 events, with representation in all sports included in the event program. There were 33 athletes qualified in Nordic skiing and biathlon, 10 in alpine skiing, and 6 in snowboarding. The Russian Olympic Committee fielded a 17-player sled hockey team, which had placed third at the last World Championships, and a 5-player wheelchair curling team.

At general assembly in Seoul in September 2025, the IPC voted to revoke sanctions against Russia and Belarus, reacquiring rights and privileges of IPC members. However, since they were not yet able to participate in the competitions organised by the federations, no athlete would have been able to qualify in time for 2026 Winter Paralympics. So, on 17 February 2026, the IPC granted six wildcards to Russian athletes and four to Belarusian for the 2026 Paralympic Games with their flags. As sign of protest, Czechia, Estonia, Finland, Latvia, Poland, and Ukraine announced that would boycott the opening ceremony.

== Medalists ==
The following Russia competitors won medals at the games. In the discipline sections below, the medalists' names are bolded.

Medal	Name	Sport	Event	Date
Gold	Varvara Voronchikhina	Para alpine skiing	Women's super-G, standing	9 March
Gold	Anastasiia Bagiian; Guide: Sergey Siniakin	Para cross-country skiing	Women's sprint classical, visually impaired	10 March
Gold	Ivan Golubkov	Para cross-country skiing	Men's 10 km, sitting	11 March
Gold	Anastasiia Bagiian; Guide: Sergey Siniakin	Para cross-country skiing	Women's 10 kilometre classical, visually impaired	11 March
Gold	Varvara Voronchikhina	Para alpine skiing	Women's slalom, standing	14 March
Gold	Ivan Golubkov	Para cross-country skiing	Men's 20 kilometre, sitting	15 March
Gold	Anastasiia Bagiian; Guide: Sergey Siniakin	Para cross-country skiing	Women's 20 kilometre freestyle, visually impaired	15 March
Gold	Alexey Bugaev	Para alpine skiing	Men's slalom, standing	15 March
Silver	Varvara Voronchikhina	Para alpine skiing	Women's giant slalom, standing	12 March
Bronze	Alexey Bugaev	Para alpine skiing	Men's downhill, standing	7 March
Bronze	Varvara Voronchikhina	Para alpine skiing	Women's downhill, standing	7 March
Bronze	Alexey Bugaev	Para alpine skiing	Men's giant slalom, standing	13 March

Medals by sport
Sport	1st place, gold medalist(s)	2nd place, silver medalist(s)	3rd place, bronze medalist(s)	Total
Para cross-country skiing	5	0	0	**5**
Para alpine skiing	3	1	3	**7**
Total	8	1	3	12

Medals by date
Day	Date	1st place, gold medalist(s)	2nd place, silver medalist(s)	3rd place, bronze medalist(s)	Total
1	7 March	0	0	2	**2**
2	8 March	0	0	0	**0**
3	9 March	1	0	0	**1**
4	10 March	1	0	0	**1**
5	11 March	2	0	0	**2**
6	12 March	0	1	0	**1**
7	13 March	0	0	1	**1**
8	14 March	1	0	0	**1**
9	15 March	3	0	0	**3**
Total		8	1	3	12

Medals by gender
Gender	1st place, gold medalist(s)	2nd place, silver medalist(s)	3rd place, bronze medalist(s)	Total
Male	3	0	2	**5**
Female	5	1	1	**7**
Total	8	1	3	12

== Competitors ==
Russia competed in skiing, cross-country skiing and snowboarding; the athletes were evenly split between male and female. The following is the list of number of competitors participating at the Games per sport/discipline.

Sport	Men	Women	Total
Para alpine skiing	1	1	2
Para cross-country skiing	1	1	2
Para snowboard	2	0	2
Total	4	2	6

== Para alpine skiing ==
Men

Athlete	Class	Event	Run 1		Run 2		Total	
Athlete	Class	Event	Time	Rank	Time	Rank	Time	Rank
Alexey Bugaev	LW6/8-2	Downhill, standing	—N/a				1:18.94	3rd place, bronze medalist(s)
Alexey Bugaev	LW6/8-2	Super-G, standing	—N/a				1:14.11	4
Alexey Bugaev	LW6/8-2	Giant slalom, standing	1:05.71	3	1:05.43	3	2:11.14	3rd place, bronze medalist(s)
Alexey Bugaev	LW6/8-2	Slalom, standing	45.39	1	43.16	2	1:28.55	1st place, gold medalist(s)
Alexey Bugaev	LW6/8-2	Super combined, standing	1:13.10	1	Did not finish			

Women

Athlete	Class	Event	Run 1		Run 2		Total	
Athlete	Class	Event	Time	Rank	Time	Rank	Time	Rank
Varvara Voronchikhina	LW6/8-2	Downhill, standing	—N/a				1:24.47	3rd place, bronze medalist(s)
Varvara Voronchikhina	LW6/8-2	Super-G, standing	—N/a				1:15.60	1st place, gold medalist(s)
Varvara Voronchikhina	LW6/8-2	Giant slalom, standing	1:11.61	2	1:13.65	2	2:25.26	2nd place, silver medalist(s)
Varvara Voronchikhina	LW6/8-2	Slalom, standing	42.65	2	44.30	1	1:26.95	1st place, gold medalist(s)
Varvara Voronchikhina	LW6/8-2	Super combined, standing	Did not finish					

== Para cross-country skiing ==
Distance

Athlete	Class	Event	Real time	Factor	Result	Rank
Ivan Golubkov	LW11.5	Men's 10 km, sitting	25:06.0	96%	24:05.8	1st place, gold medalist(s)
Ivan Golubkov	LW11.5	Men's 20 km, sitting	54:04.8	96%	51:55.0	1st place, gold medalist(s)
Anastasiia Bagiian; Guide: Sergei Siniakin	NS1	Women's 10 km classical, visually impaired	33:42.4	88%	29:39.7	1st place, gold medalist(s)
Anastasiia Bagiian; Guide: Sergei Siniakin	NS1	Women's 20 km freestyle, visually impaired	49:59.0	88%	43:59.1	1st place, gold medalist(s)

Sprint

Athlete	Class	Event	Qualification				Semifinal		Final	
Athlete	Class	Event	Real time	Factor	Result	Rank	Time	Rank	Time	Rank
Ivan Golubkov	LW11.5	Men's sprint, sitting	2:28.38	96%	2:22.44	19	Did not advance			
Anastasiia Bagiian; Guide: Sergei Siniakin	NS1	Women's sprint classical, visually impaired	3:18.99	88%	2:55.11	2 Q	3.24.0	1 Q	3:16.1	1st place, gold medalist(s)

Relay

Athletes	Event	Time	Rank
Ivan Golubkov; Anastasiia Bagiian; Guide: Sergei Siniakin	4 × 2.5 km mixed relay	24:40.2	6

== Para snowboard ==
Slalom

Athlete	Event	Run 1	Run 2	Best	Rank
Dmitry Fadeyev	Men's banked slalom, SB-LL1	1:11.42	1:10.96	1:10.96	12
Philipp Shebbo	Men's banked slalom, SB-LL1	DNF	DNF	—	

Snowboard cross

Athlete	Event	Seeding		Quarterfinal	Semifinal	Final	
Athlete	Event	Time	Rank	Position	Position	Position	Rank
Dmitry Fadeyev	Snowboard cross, SB-LL1	59.45	12	3	Did not advance		
Philipp Shebbo	Snowboard cross, SB-LL1	1:02.02	13	4	Did not advance		

== See also ==
- Individual Neutral Athletes at the 2026 Winter Olympics
