= Michael O'Hearn (athlete) =

American para-alpine skier (born 2001)

Personal information
- Born: June 20, 2001 (age 25)
- Home town: Spring Lake, New Jersey, U.S.
- Education: Westminster University

Sport
- Country: United States
- Sport: Para-alpine skiing
- Disability: Arthrogryposis multiplex congenita
- Disability class: LW9-1

Michael O'Hearn (born June 20, 2001) is an American para-alpine skier who competes in the LW9-1 standing classification. He represented the United States at the 2026 Winter Paralympics in para-alpine skiing.

== Early and personal life ==
Michael O'Hearn grew up in Spring Lake, New Jersey. He was born with arthrogryposis multiplex congenita, a rare congenital condition that causes joint contractures and limits the range of motion. Prior to his birth, doctors informed his parents that he might not survive and later suggested that he would never walk. He began skiing at the age of three at the Adaptive Sports Foundation in Windham, New York. He attended St. Rose High School in Belmar, New Jersey. He graduated from Westminster University in Salt Lake City.

O'Hearn identifies as gay and has spoken publicly about the challenges he faced and the importance of LGBTQ representation in sport.

== Career ==
O'Hearn competes in the LW9-1 standing classification in para-alpine skiing, which covers standing athletes with impairments affecting at least one arm and at least one leg, including those resulting from reduced joint mobility. He trains at the National Ability Center in Park City, Utah. He made his international debut for the United States at an International Ski and Snowboard Federation (FIS) event in February 2016. He won a bronze in the slalom event in the competition. He registered sixth place finishes in both slalom and giant slalom events in the National Open Championships in March 2016.

In a career spanning over a decade, O'Hearn took part in several FIS events across Canada and United States. He won the gold medal in the LW9 standing classification at the 2025 Huntsman Cup held in Park City. In January 2026, he achieved a third-place finish in the giant slalom event at a FIS Para alpine race at Winter Park, Colorado. Based on these performances, he was named to the United States team for the para-alpine skiing competition at the 2026 Winter Paralympics in Milan–Cortina.

In February 2026, a few weeks before the 2026 Winter Paralympics, O'Hearn suffered an anterior cruciate ligament injury. However, he still competed in the giant slalom event. In the giant slalom standing event held on 12 March 2026, O'Hearn completed his first run on a minute and 29.88 seconds. He improved in his second run to 1:28.90. He finished with an overall time of 2:58.78, more than 51 seconds behind the gold medalist Arthur Bauchet, and was ranked 28th out of the 41 competitors.
