= Michaela Gosselin =

Canadian Para alpine skier (born 2001)

- Gosselin in 2026

Personal information
- Full name: Michaela Rose Gosselin
- Born: January 31, 2001 (age 25) Collingwood, Ontario, Canada
- Height: 5 ft 10 in (178 cm)
- Parent: Kevin Gosselin (father)

Sport
- Country: Canada
- Sport: Para alpine skiing
- Disability class: LW6/8-1
- Events: Downhill, SuperG, Slalom, Giant Slalom, Super Combined
Medal record
Women's Para alpine skiing
Representing Canada
Paralympic Games
Bronze medal – third place	2026 Milano Cortina	Slalom standing
World Championships
Bronze medal – third place	2021 Lillehammer	Slalom

Michaela Rose Gosselin (born January 31, 2001) is a Canadian Para alpine skier who competed at the 2022 Winter Paralympics. She is a current member of the Canadian Para Alpine Ski Team.

== Early life and education ==
Gosselin is from Collingwood, Ontario. Her father, Kevin Gosselin, now a teacher at Our Lady of the Bay Catholic High School, competed on Canada's national alpine ski team. Michaela Gosselin began skiing when she was one and a half years old. She competed ski racing with Osler Bluff Ski Club through U16 competitions, but shifted to competitive volleyball. At 18, Gosselin was diagnosed with cancer, which lead to a scapulectomy of her left shoulder. She is a student at Queen's University.

== Career ==
Gosselin was recruited to para sport within a week of her cancer diagnosis. She joined the national Para-Alpine competition in the 2019/20 season. She made her debut at the 2021 World Para Snow Sports Championships held in Lillehammer, Norway where she won the bronze medal in the slalom event. She qualified to compete at the 2022 Winter Paralympics held in Beijing, China. She placed fourth in slalom, fifth in downhill, sixth in giant slalom, and failed to complete the Super G, placing seventh in that event.

Following the Paralympics, she tore her ACL and MCL and was sidelined from competition. She made her return at the 2024 Para Alpine World Cup and placed fifth and fourth in the women's standing category in giant slalom at the finals in Sella Nevea, Italy.

Gosselin won two gold medals, including her first at a Para Alpine World Cup event, in 2025 in women's standing downhill events at the World Cup event Santa Caterina, Italy. Due to poor weather, both races took place on the same day. The first of the two medals was her fourth top-three finish of the season and her first podium in downhill. She placed second and third at the 2025 World Cup event in St. Moritz, Switzerland.

Gosselin competed in the 2026 Winter Paralympics, earning a bronze medal.
