= Idiakez =

Idiakez is a surname. Notable people with the surname include:

- Imanol Idiakez (born 1972), Spanish footballer and manager
- Iñigo Idiakez (born 1973), Spanish footballer and manager, brother of Imanol
- Irati Idiakez (born 1996), Spanish para-snowboarder
