= Michał Gołaś (skier) =

Polish Para alpine skier (born 2004)

Personal information
- Born: 7 October 2004 (age 21)

Sport
- Country: Poland
- Sport: Para alpine skiing
- Disability: Visually impaired
- Disability class: AS3
Medal record
Men's Para alpine skiing
Representing Poland
Paralympic Games
Silver medal – second place	2026 Milano Cortina	Slalom
Bronze medal – third place	2026 Milano Cortina	Giant slalom
World Championships
Bronze medal – third place	2023 Lleida	Alpine combined
Bronze medal – third place	2025 Maribor	Slalom
Bronze medal – third place	2025 Maribor	Giant slalom
World University Games
Gold medal – first place	2025 Turin	Giant slalom
Gold medal – first place	2025 Turin	Super-G

Michał Gołaś (born 7 October 2004) is a Polish visually impaired Para alpine skier.

== Career ==
In January 2025, he competed at the 2025 Winter World University Games in Para alpine skiing and won gold medals in the giant slalom and Super-G events. The next month he competed at the 2025 World Para Alpine Skiing Championships and won bronze medals in the slalom and giant slalom events.

In February 2026, he was selected to represent Poland at the 2026 Winter Paralympics.

== Personal life ==
Gołaś' sister, Oliwia Gołaś, is also a visually impaired Para alpine skier.
