= Cuche =

Cuche is a surname. Notable people with the surname include:

- Didier Cuche (born 1974), Swiss alpine skier
- Robin Cuche (born 1998), Swiss para-alpine skier
