= Romy Tschopp =

Swiss Paralympic snowboarder (born 1993)

Personal information
- Nationality: Swiss
- Born: 14 October 1993 (age 32) Switzerland
Medal record
Women's para snowboarding
Representing Switzerland
World Para Snow Sports Championships
Bronze medal – third place	2021 Lillehammer	Team event

Romy Tschopp (born 14 October 1993) is a Swiss para-snowboarder in the SB-LL2 category.

== Life and career ==
At the 2021 World Para Snow Sports Championships held in Lillehammer, Norway, Tschopp, along with Ellen Walther, won the bronze medal in the women's team event. She competed for Switzerland in snowboarding at the 2022 Winter Paralympics in Beijing, China. She competed in the women's snowboard cross SB-LL2 and women's banked slalom SB-LL2 events.
