= René De Silvestro =

Italian Para alpine skier (born 1996)

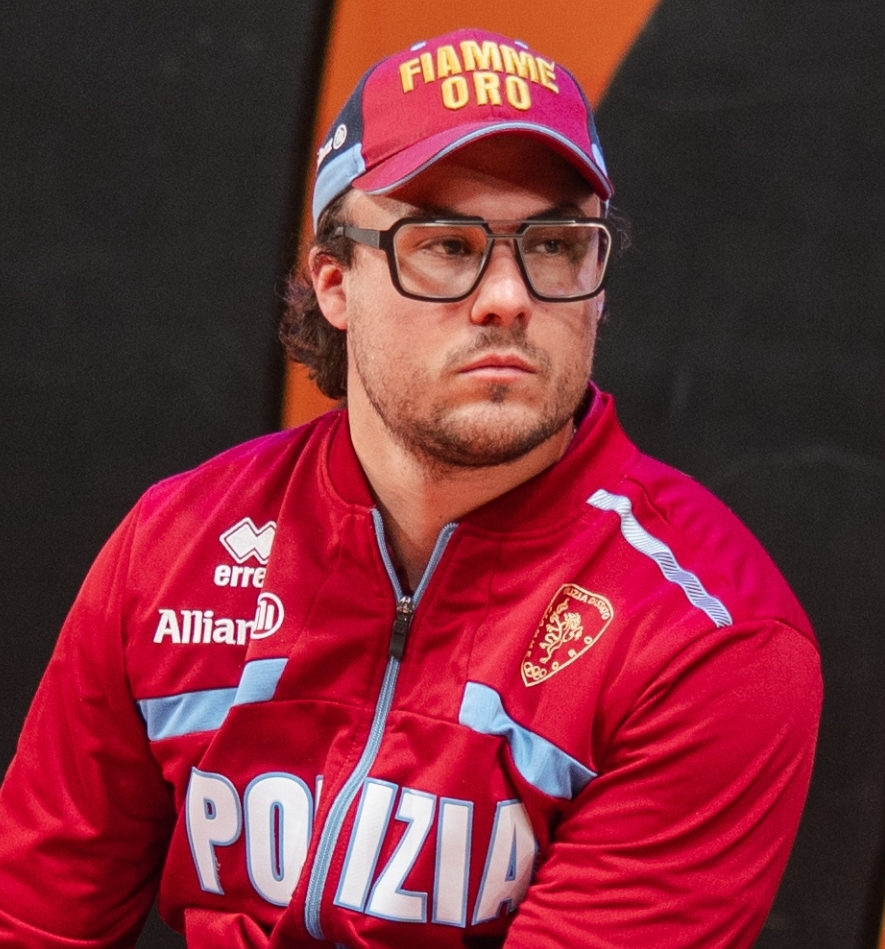
- De Silvestro in 2026

Personal information
- Born: 26 June 1996 (age 30)

Sport
- Country: Italy
- Sport: Para alpine skiing
- Disability class: LW12-1
Medal record
Men's Para alpine skiing
Representing Italy
Paralympic Games
Gold medal – first place	2026 Milano Cortina	Giant slalom sitting
Silver medal – second place	2022 Beijing	Giant slalom sitting
Silver medal – second place	2026 Milano Cortina	Super combined sitting
Bronze medal – third place	2022 Beijing	Slalom sitting
World Championships
Gold medal – first place	2021 Lillehammer	Super combined sitting
Gold medal – first place	2025 Maribor	Giant slalom sitting
Silver medal – second place	2023 Lleida	Alpine combined sitting
Silver medal – second place	2023 Lleida	Slalom sitting
Silver medal – second place	2025 Maribor	Slalom sitting
Bronze medal – third place	2021 Lillehammer	Super-G sitting

René De Silvestro (Italian pronunciation: [reˌne dе silˈvɛstro]; born 26 June 1996) is an Italian Para alpine skier. He is a three-time Paralympian.

== Career ==
Silvestro represented Italy at the 2018 Winter Paralympics and finished in seventh place in the slalom sitting event and eighth place in the giant slalom sitting event.

He competed at the 2021 World Para Snow Sports Championships and won a gold medal in the super combined sitting event, and a bronze medal in the Super-G sitting event.

He again competed at the 2022 Winter Paralympics and won a silver medal in the giant slalom and a bronze medal in the slalom sitting events.
