= Josh Hanlon =

Australian Paralympic alpine skier

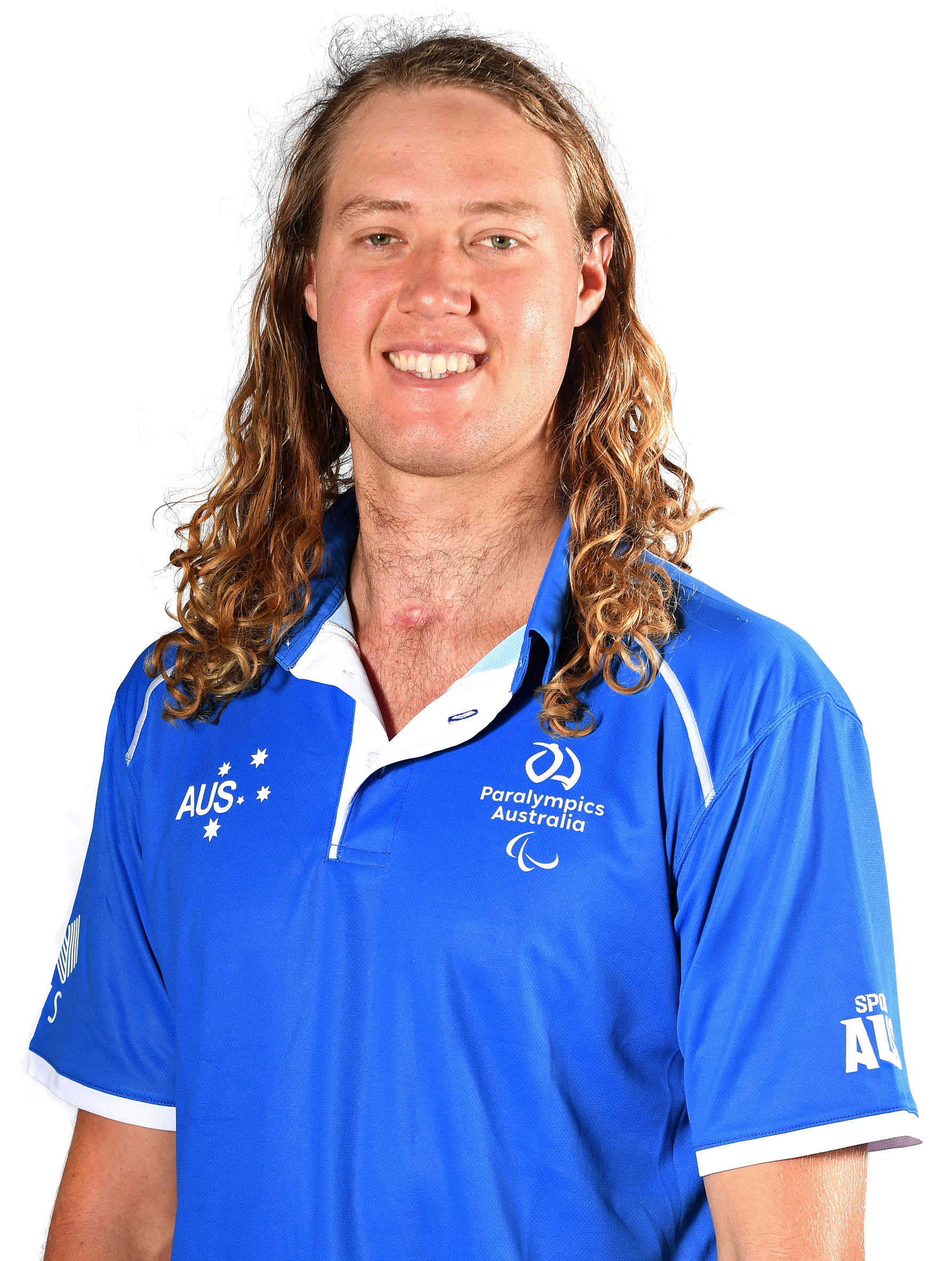
- 2022 Winter Paralympics Portrait

Personal information
- Nickname: Chooka
- Nationality: Australia
- Born: 7 August 1997 (age 28)

Sport
- Country: Australia
- Sport: Para-alpine skiing
- Disability class: LW12-2

Josh Hanlon (born 7 August 1997) is an Australian Paralympic alpine skier who represented Australia at the 2022 Winter Paralympics and the 2026 Winter Paralympics.

== Personal ==
Josh Hanlon was born on 7 August 1997. He comes from Weethalle, New South Wales. At age 20, Hanlon 's had severe bacterial infection, which resulted in toxic shock and sepsis and led to him becoming a double below-knee amputee and the loss of his right hand at the wrist. Hanlon he has a Certificate 3 and 4 in physical fitness.

== Skiing ==
Prior to his Para alpine sit skiing career, Hanlon was a member Greater Western Sydney Giants Academy teams from the age of 15 to 19. In 2019, he became a member Australian Winter Para-alpine development squad. He is classified as an LW12-2 skier. Hanlon travelled overseas with the Australian Winter Para-alpine development squad during the 2019–20 season.

At the 2021 World Para Snow Sports Championships in Lillehammer, he finished 16th in the Giant Slalom Sitting.

Hanlon at the 2022 Winter Paralympics competed in two events and finished sixth in the Slalom Sitting and 11th in the Giant Slalom Sitting.

At the end of the 2023/2024 World Cup season, he was ranked 11th overall in men's sitting category, ninth in slalom and 12th in giant slalom.

At the 2026 Winter Paralympics, he competed in five events - 9th in the Men's Slalom - Sitting, 10th in Men's Giant slalom - Sitting, 12th in Men's Super combined - Sitting and did not finish in the Dowhill and Super G Combined. id not finish in the Dowhill and Super G Combined.

== Recognition ==
- 2022 – Paralympics Australia Rookie of the Year
