= Nette Kiviranta =

Finnish Para alpine skier (born 2001)

Personal information
- Born: 30 August 2001 (age 25)

Sport
- Country: Finland
- Sport: Para alpine skiing
- Disability class: LW11
Medal record
Women's Para alpine skiing
Representing Finland
Paralympic Games
Silver medal – second place	2026 Milano Cortina	Slalom sitting
World Championships
Silver medal – second place	2021 Lillehammer	Slalom sitting
Bronze medal – third place	2023 Lleida	Giant slalom sitting
World University Games
Gold medal – first place	2025 Turin	Giant slalom sitting

Nette Kiviranta (born 30 August 2001) is a Finnish Para alpine skier.

== Career ==
Kiviranta competed at the 2021 World Para Snow Sports Championships and won a silver medal in the slalom sitting event in January 2022. According to the International Paralympic Committee, in order to qualify for the Paralympics an athlete must have a license from the last two seasons. She only received her disability classification this season, and competed in her first competitions in November 2021. As a result, she was not approved to compete at the 2022 Winter Paralympics.

She competed at the 2023 World Para Alpine Skiing Championships and won a bronze medal in the giant slalom sitting event with a time of 2:28:00.

In January 2025, Kiviranta competed at the 2025 Winter World University Games in para-alpine skiing and won a gold medal in the giant slalom sitting event with a time of 2:26.85. She was one of the first Finnish athletes selected to represent Finland at the 2026 Winter Paralympics.

== Personal life ==
Kiviranta was involved in a car accident in April 2018, and suffered a spinal cord injury which caused paralysis in her lower limbs.

== World Cup results ==
=== Season standings ===
Season
Season	Age	Overall	Slalom	Giant slalom	Super-G	Downhill
2023	21	5	3	4	—	—
2024	22	7	5	—	—	—
2025	23	5	6	3	—	—
2026	24	3	2	3	—	—
