= Vera Khlyzova =

Russian Paralympic cross-country skier and biathlete (born 2001)

Personal information
- Nationality: Russian
- Born: 2001 (age 24–25)
Medal record
Representing RPC
Women's para biathlon
World Para Snow Sports Championships
Gold medal – first place	2021 Lillehammer	6 km
Gold medal – first place	2021 Lillehammer	10 km
Gold medal – first place	2021 Lillehammer	12.5 km
Women's para cross-country skiing
World Para Snow Sports Championships
Silver medal – second place	2021 Lillehammer	15 km
Bronze medal – third place	2021 Lillehammer	10 km

Vera Khlyzova (born 2001) is a Russian Paralympic cross-country skier and biathlete. She competes in the B2 category, which is for visually impaired athletes. She won the World Cup in para cross-country skiing 2019/20. She has Natalia Iakimova as her guide. She won the Paralympic cross-country skiing World Cup in 2019–20. Her sight guide is Natalia Iakimova.

== Career ==
In the 2019–20 season, Khlyzova won the World Cup in para cross-country skiing, and she also won the World Cup in para biathlon in that season. The following season, she came in third place in the World Cup in para cross-country skiing, and won the World Cup in para biathlon.

Khlyzova won the gold medal in the women's 6 km, 10 km and 12.5 km biathlon events at the 2021 World Para Snow Sports Championships held in Lillehammer, Norway. She also won the silver and bronze medal in the women's 15 km and 10 km cross-country skiing events respectively.
