= Sara Choi =

South Korean para-alpine skier

Personal information
- Nationality: South Korean
- Born: 25 June 2003 (age 23) South Korea
Medal record
Representing South Korea
Women's para-alpine skiing
World Para Snow Sports Championships
Bronze medal – third place	2021 Lillehammer	Downhill
Bronze medal – third place	2021 Lillehammer	Super combined

Sara Choi (Korean: 최사라;born 25 June 2003) is a South Korean para-alpine skier. She competes in the B2 category, which is for visually impaired athletes.

== Career ==
Choi competed at the 2021 World Para Snow Sports Championships held in Lillehammer, Norway, winning the bronze medal in the downhill and super combined events.

She represented South Korea at the 2022 Winter Paralympics held in Beijing, China.
