= World ski championships =

World ski championships may refer to:

- FIS Alpine World Ski Championships
- IPC Alpine Skiing World Championships, Alpine, disability
- FIS Freestyle World Ski Championships
- FIS Nordic World Ski Championships
- FIS Ski-Flying World Championships
- FIS Snowboard World Championships
