= Ellen Walther =

Swiss Paralympic snowboarder (born 1999)

Personal information
- Nationality: Swiss
- Born: 26 May 1999 (age 27) Basel, Switzerland
Medal record
Women's para snowboarding
Representing Switzerland
World Para Snow Sports Championships
Bronze medal – third place	2021 Lillehammer	Snowboard cross
Bronze medal – third place	2021 Lillehammer	Dual banked slalom
Bronze medal – third place	2021 Lillehammer	Team event

Ellen Walther (born 26 May 1999) is a Swiss para-snowboarder in the SB-LL1 category.

== Life and career ==
Walther won the bronze medal in the women's dual banked slalom SB-LL1 event at the 2021 World Para Snow Sports Championships held in Lillehammer, Norway. She also won the bronze medal in the women's snowboard cross SB-LL1 event. Along with Romy Tschopp, Walther won the bronze medal in the women's team event.
