= Victor Pierrel =

French para-alpine skier

Personal information
- Born: 23 January 1992 (age 34) Dax, Landes, France

Sport
- Country: France
- Sport: Para-alpine skiing
- Disability class: LW12.1
Medal record
Men's para-alpine skiing
Representing France
World Championships
Silver medal – second place	2021 Lillehammer	Slalom

Victor Pierrel (born 23 January 1992) is a French para-alpine skier who competes in the LW12.1 category.

== Career ==
At the 2021 World Para Snow Sports Championships held in Lillehammer, Norway, Pierrel won the silver medal in the men's sitting slalom event.
