= 2023 World Para Alpine Skiing Championships =

International para skiing competition

2023 World Para Alpine Skiing World Championships
- Host city: Lleida, Spain
- Events: Downhill, giant slalom, slalom, super combined, super-G
- Dates: 20–29 January

The 2023 World Para Alpine Skiing Championships was an international disability sport alpine skiing event held in Lleida, Spain from 20 to 29 January. The championships are held biannually by the International Ski and Snowboard Federation (FIS).

== Men's events ==
Event	Class	Gold	Time	Silver	Time	Bronze	Time
Downhill	Visually impaired	Johannes Aigner (AUT); Guide: Matteo Fleischmann	48.38	Hyacinthe Deleplace (FRA); Guide: Roy Piccard	48.84	Michael Scharnagl (AUT); Guide: Florian Erharter	50.31
Downhill	Sitting	Jesper Pedersen (NOR)	49.62	Taiki Morii (JPN)	50.52	Jeroen Kampschreur (NED)	50.97
Downhill	Standing	Markus Salcher (AUT)	50.03	Robin Cuche (SUI)	50.11	Alexis Guimond (CAN)	51.07
Super-G	Visually impaired	Neil Simpson (GBR); Guide: Rob Poth	56.66	Johannes Aigner (AUT); Guide: Matteo Fleischmann	56.68	Giacomo Bertagnolli (ITA); Guide: Andrea Ravelli	57.94
Super-G	Sitting	Taiki Morii (JPN)	56.98	Jeroen Kampschreur (NED)	56.99	Jesper Pedersen (NOR)	57.34
Super-G	Standing	Markus Salcher (AUT)	56.95	Robin Cuche (SUI)	57.15	Arthur Bauchet (FRA)	57.74
Giant slalom	Visually impaired	Giacomo Bertagnolli (ITA); Guide: Andrea Ravelli	1:50.24	Johannes Aigner (AUT); Guide: Matteo Fleischmann	1:51.29	Neil Simpson (GBR); Guide: Rob Poth	1:51.52
Giant slalom	Sitting	Jesper Pedersen (NOR)	1:54.04	Jeroen Kampschreur (NED)	1:54.83	Niels de Langen (NED)	1:57.84
Giant slalom	Standing	Arthur Bauchet (FRA)	1:56.80	Théo Gmür (SUI)	1:57.28	Federico Pelizzari (ITA)	1:58.78
Slalom	Visually impaired	Giacomo Bertagnolli (ITA); Guide: Andrea Ravelli	1:35.38	Neil Simpson (GBR); Guide: Rob Poth	1:37:06	Hwang Min-gyu (KOR); Guide: Jung Sang-hyun	1:58:81
Slalom	Sitting	Jesper Pedersen (NOR)	1:37:70	René De Silvestro (ITA)	1:40:06	Taiki Morii (JPN)	1:44:42
Slalom	Standing	Arthur Bauchet (FRA)	1:38.91	Jordan Broisin (FRA)	1:46:96	Oscar Burnham (FRA)	1:48.03
Alpine combined	Visually impaired	Johannes Aigner (AUT); Guide: Matteo Fleischmann	1:44.24	Giacomo Bertagnolli (ITA); Guide: Branislav Brozman	1:45.89	Michał Gołaś (POL); Guide: Kacper Walas	1:48.48
Alpine combined	Sitting	Jesper Pedersen (NOR)	1:47.82	René De Silvestro (ITA)	1:48.68	Jeroen Kampschreur (NED)	1:50.77
Alpine combined	Standing	Arthur Bauchet (FRA)	1:47.93	Robin Cuche (SUI)	1:53.13	Aaron Lindström (SWE)	1:54.06

== Women's events ==
Event	Class	Gold	Time	Silver	Time	Bronze	Time
Downhill	Visually impaired	Chiara Mazzel (ITA); Guide: Fabrizio Casal	53.91	Martina Vozza (ITA); Guide: Ylenia Sabidussi	55.04	Alexandra Rexová (SVK); Guide: Eva Trajčíková	56.43
Downhill	Sitting	Barbara van Bergen (NED)	55.29	Anna-Lena Forster (GER)	57.86	Not awarded	
Downhill	Standing	Anna-Maria Rieder (GER)	55.35	Aurélie Richard (FRA)	56.27	Frédérique Turgeon (CAN)	56.64
Super-G	Visually impaired	Chiara Mazzel (ITA); Guide: Fabrizio Casal	1:00.40	Martina Vozza (ITA); Guide: Ylenia Sabidussi	1:03.79	Eva Nikou (GRE); Guide: Dimitris Profentzas	1:04.91
Super-G	Sitting	Anna-Lena Forster (GER)	1:07.57	Laurie Stephens (USA)	1:10.31	Saylor O'Brien (USA)	1:18.26
Super-G	Standing	Ebba Årsjö (SWE)	1:00.91	Andrea Rothfuss (GER)	1:05.06	Anna-Maria Rieder (GER)	1:05.33
Giant slalom	Visually impaired	Veronika Aigner (AUT); Guide: Elisabeth Aigner	1:58.41	Menna Fitzpatrick (GBR); Guide: Katie Guest	2:03.64	Barbara Aigner (AUT); Guide: Klara Sykora	2:05:62
Giant slalom	Sitting	Anna-Lena Forster (GER)	2:14:20	Laurie Stephens (USA)	2:26:90	Nette Kiviranta (FIN)	2:28:00
Giant slalom	Standing	Ebba Årsjö (SWE)	2:01:16	Anna-Maria Rieder (GER)	2:05:92	Andrea Rothfuss (GER)	2:07:86
Slalom	Visually impaired	Veronika Aigner (AUT); Guide: Elisabeth Aigner	1:46.83	Barbara Aigner (AUT); Guide: Klara Sykora	1:50:15	Menna Fitzpatrick (GBR); Guide: Katie Guest	1:52:28
Slalom	Sitting	Anna-Lena Forster (GER)	1:53:66	Audrey Pascual Seco (ESP)	2:19:28	Not awarded	
Slalom	Standing	Ebba Årsjö (SWE)	1:44.27	Aurélie Richard (FRA)	1:57:30	Andrea Rothfuss (GER)	1:59.13
Alpine combined	Visually impaired	Chiara Mazzel (ITA); Guide: Fabrizio Casal	1:59.95	Alexandra Rexová (SVK); Guide: Eva Trajčíková	2:00.97	Eva Nikou (GRE); Guide: Dimitris Profentzas	2:01.41
Alpine combined	Sitting	Anna-Lena Forster (GER)	2:03.13	Laurie Stephens (USA)	2:17.71	Saylor O'Brien (USA)	2:28.87
Alpine combined	Standing	Ebba Årsjö (SWE)	1:58.44	Anna-Maria Rieder (GER)	2:01.80	Aurelie Richard (FRA)	2:03.46
