= Jesper Pedersen (alpine skier) =

Norwegian Para alpine skier (born 1999)

Personal information
- Full name: Jesper Saltvik Pedersen
- Born: 23 August 1999 (age 27)

Sport
- Country: Norway
- Sport: Para alpine skiing
- Disability class: LW11
Medal record
Men's Para alpine skiing
Representing Norway
Paralympic Games
Gold medal – first place	2018 PyeongChang	Giant slalom
Gold medal – first place	2022 Beijing	Super-G sitting
Gold medal – first place	2022 Beijing	Super combined sitting
Gold medal – first place	2022 Beijing	Slalom sitting
Gold medal – first place	2022 Beijing	Giant slalom sitting
Gold medal – first place	2026 Milano Cortina	Downhill sitting
Silver medal – second place	2022 Beijing	Downhill sitting
Silver medal – second place	2026 Milano Cortina	Super-G sitting
Silver medal – second place	2026 Milano Cortina	Slalom sitting
Bronze medal – third place	2018 PyeongChang	Super combined sitting
Bronze medal – third place	2026 Milano Cortina	Giant slalom sitting
World Championships
Gold medal – first place	2021 Lillehammer	Downhill sitting
Gold medal – first place	2021 Lillehammer	Giant slalom sitting
Gold medal – first place	2021 Lillehammer	Slalom sitting
Gold medal – first place	2023 Lleida	Downhill sitting
Gold medal – first place	2023 Lleida	Alpine combined sitting
Gold medal – first place	2023 Lleida	Giant slalom sitting
Gold medal – first place	2023 Lleida	Slalom sitting
Gold medal – first place	2025 Maribor	Slalom sitting
Silver medal – second place	2021 Lillehammer	Super-G sitting
Silver medal – second place	2021 Lillehammer	Super combined sitting
Silver medal – second place	2025 Maribor	Giant slalom sitting
Bronze medal – third place	2023 Lleida	Super-G sitting

Jesper Saltvik Pedersen (born 23 August 1999) is a Para alpine skier. He is a six-time Paralympic gold medalist.

== Career ==
He won gold for Norway at the 2018 Winter Paralympics in his giant slalom event.

He competed at the 2021 World Para Snow Sports Championships and he won five medals, including three gold medals, in para-alpine skiing.

He represented Norway at the 2022 Winter Paralympics and won four gold medals and one silver medal. He was the only competitor to win four gold medals at the Games.
