= Kalle Eriksson =

Canadian Para alpine skier (born 2004)

Personal information
- Born: November 1, 2004 (age 21)
- Home town: Kimberley, British Columbia, Canada

Sport
- Country: Canada
- Sport: Para alpine skiing
- Disability: Solar retinopathy
- Disability class: AS2
Medal record
Men's Para alpine skiing
Representing Canada
Paralympic Games
Silver medal – second place	2026 Milano Cortina	Downhill
Bronze medal – third place	2026 Milano Cortina	Super-G
Bronze medal – third place	2026 Milano Cortina	Slalom
World Championships
Silver medal – second place	2025 Maribor	Slalom
Silver medal – second place	2025 Maribor	Giant slalom

Kalle Eriksson (born November 1, 2004) is a Canadian visually impaired Para alpine skier.

== Career ==
Eriksson was named Alpine Canada's Para-Alpine Athlete of the Year in 2025. He competed at the 2025 World Para Alpine Skiing Championships and won silver medals in the slalom and giant slalom events.

He was selected to represent Canada at the 2026 Winter Paralympics.

== Personal life ==
Eriksson lost his vision due to solar retinopathy in 2022.

Eriksson's father, Lasse, is a national team para-alpine skiing coach with Team Canada.
