= Ollie Hill =

British snowboarder (born 1989)

Personal information
- Nationality: British
- Born: Oliver Hall; 8 May 1989 (age 37)

Sport
- Country: United Kingdom
- Sport: Snowboarding

Achievements and titles
- Paralympic finals: 2022
- World finals: 2021
Medal record
Men's Snowboarding
Representing Great Britain
Winter Paralympic Games
Bronze medal – third place	2022 Beijing	Banked slalom
World Championships
Bronze medal – third place	2021 Lillehammer	Team

Oliver Hill (born 8 May 1989) is a British para-snowboarder and former motorcycle racer. He competes in snowboarding events for athletes with lower limb disabilities. Hill came third in the banked slalom events at the 2022 Winter Paralympics and 2021 World Para Snow Sports Championships.

== Early life ==
Hill is from Reading, England. He began snowboarding at the age of eight, and later also competed in motocross, and the Triumph Triple Challenge superbike competition. In December 2018, he was involved in a car accident which resulted in his right leg being amputated. In March 2019, he received a prosthetic leg.

== Career ==
Hill competes in snowboarding events for athletes with lower limb disabilities. In 2020, Hill joined GB Snowsport. He came second at the 2020-21 World Cup event in Pyhätunturi, behind fellow Briton James Barnes-Miller. Hill finished second overall in the 2021 World Para Snowboard World Cup, with a best finish of second at an event in Colere, Italy. At the 2021 World Para Snow Sports Championships held in Lillehammer, Norway, Hill and Barnes-Miller won the bronze medal in the men's team event. He also came fourth in the individual banked slalom event, after losing the bronze-medal race to Australian Ben Tudhope.

At the 2022 Winter Paralympics, Hill won the bronze medal in the banked slalom event. He was the first Briton to win a snowboarding medal at the Paralympics. He was third after the first run in the event, and did not improve on his second run. During the Paralympics, Hill had switched off his phone and chosen to avoid social media.
