= Deans Community High School =

Secondary school in West Lothian, Scotland

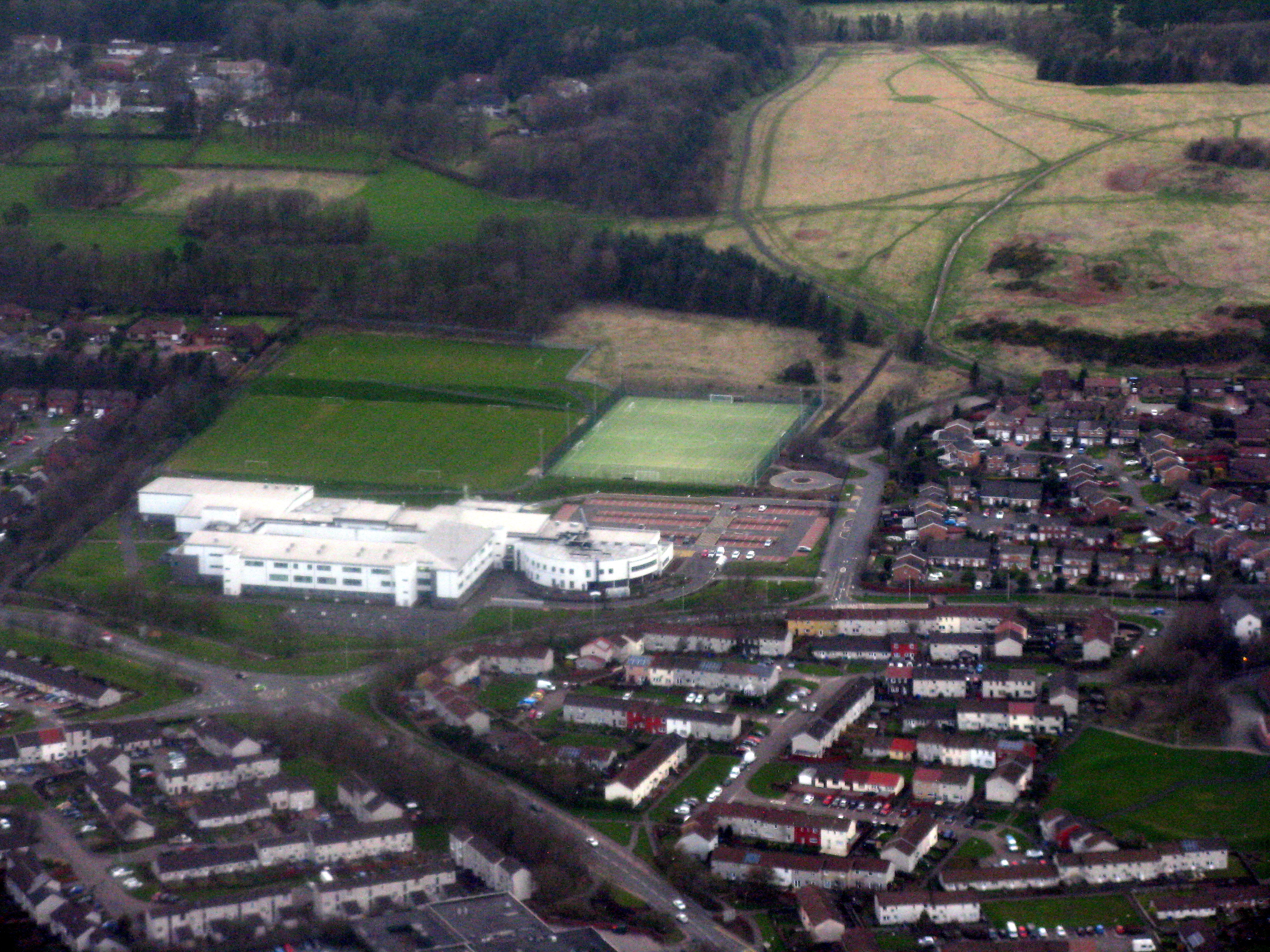

Location
- Eastwood Park; Livingston, West Lothian, EH54 8PS; Scotland; 55°54′21.3″N 3°32′54.13″W

Information
- Type: Secondary school
- Motto: Integrity, Respect, Inclusion, Compassion, Aspiration
- Established: 1969 (New building 2009)
- Age: 12 to 19
- Enrolment: 1279
- Houses: Cairnpapple, Dechmount and Houston.
- Colour: Black/red - S1/S4, Black/silver - S5/S6
- Website: http://www.deanscommunityhighschool.com/

Deans Community High School is a secondary level school, in Deans, Livingston, Scotland. The school opened in 1978, and is co-educational, with 1279 pupils.

== Feeder schools ==
Until October 2010, the feeder primary schools were Deans Primary, Carmondean Primary, Meldrum Primary and Knightsridge Primary. It was confirmed in October 2010 that Seafield Primary had joined the list of feeder primaries when the catchment areas were redrawn.

== Re-development ==
A new school building was built on the grounds of the old sports fields and entered use towards the end of 2009. The old building was demolished early in 2010 and new sports fields have been created on the old poon site. The construction work was carried out by DAWN Construction.

The school has a swimming pool and adjacent café (both of which are open to the public), a theatre, and rooms available for community activities. The school uniform is black, white and red.

== Notable former pupils ==
- Shona Brownlee, Airwoman and Winter Paralympian
- Keith Watson, former Dundee United player
