= Varvara Voronchikhina =

Russian Para alpine skier (born 2002)

Personal information
- Full name: Varvara Olegovna Voronchikhina
- Born: 14 November 2002 (age 23) Baykalsk, Russia

Sport
- Sport: Para alpine skiing
- Disability class: LW6/8-2
Medal record
Women's Para alpine skiing
Representing Russia
Paralympic Games
| Gold medal – first place | 2026 Milan Cortina | Super-G standing |
| Gold medal – first place | 2026 Milan Cortina | Slalom standing |
| Silver medal – second place | 2026 Milan Cortina | Giant slalom standing |
| Bronze medal – third place | 2026 Milan Cortina | Downhill standing |
Representing RPC
World Para Alpine Skiing Championships
| Gold medal – first place | 2021 Lillehammer | Super-G |
| Gold medal – first place | 2021 Lillehammer | Super combined |
| Silver medal – second place | 2021 Lillehammer | Downhill |
| Silver medal – second place | 2021 Lillehammer | Giant slalom |
| Silver medal – second place | 2021 Lillehammer | Super combined |
| Silver medal – second place | 2021 Lillehammer | Parallel |

Varvara Olegovna Voronchikhina (Russian: Варвара Олеговна Ворончихина; born 14 November 2002) is a Russian Para alpine skier.

== Early life ==
Born without part of her left hand, Voronchikhina began skiing at the age of four, switching to alpine skiing at age six in her hometown of Baykalsk, near the Gora Sobolinaya alpine ski resort.

== Career ==
At the 2018 Para Alpine Skiing World Cup in Kranjska Gora, Voronchikhina won gold in the giant slalom in 2:15.19, 3.20 seconds ahead of multiple-time French athlete Marie Bochet, who finished second. Slovak Petra Smaržová finished third, completing the podium with a time of 2:27.27. In the 2020/21 World Cup season, Voronchikhina finished in second place in the women's overall ranking. At Veysonnaz 2021, she placed second in the downhill.

Voronchikhina competed at the 2021 World Para Snow Sports Championships in January 2022. She won the silver medal in downhill and giant slalom, both behind Bochet, while also taking gold in the super combined and Super-G events, finishing ahead of Bochet. Additionally she won silver medals in the slalom, and parallel event, finishing behind Ebba Årsjö. In 2026, she won Russia's first Winter Paralympic gold medal under its own flag since 2014 in super-G.
