= James Barnes-Miller =

British snowboarder (born 1989)

Personal information
- Nickname: Stubber
- Nationality: British
- Born: 31 August 1989 (age 36) Tunbridge Wells, Kent, England, United Kingdom

Sport
- Country: United Kingdom
- Sport: snowboarding
Medal record
Men's snowboarding
Representing Great Britain
World Championships
Silver medal – second place	2021 Lillehammer	Snowboard cross SB-UL
Bronze medal – third place	2021 Lillehammer	Dual Banked Slalom SB-UL
Bronze medal – third place	2021 Lillehammer	Team

James Barnes-Miller (born 31 August 1989) is a British snowboarder from Isle of Thanet. He competes in snowboarding events for athletes with upper limb disabilities after being born with an incomplete right arm. He participated at the 2018 Winter Paralympics,

He won the bronze medal in the men's dual banked slalom SB-UL event at the 2021 World Para Snow Sports Championships held in Lillehammer, Norway. Barnes-Miller and Ollie Hill also won the bronze medal in the men's team event.
