= Sviatlana Sakhanenka =

Belarusian Para cross-country skier and biathlete (born 1989)

Personal information
- Nationality: Belarus
- Born: 26 October 1989 (age 36) Navapolatsk, Belarus
- Height: 1.63 m (5 ft 4 in)
- Weight: 50 kg (110 lb)

Sport
- Sport: Para Nordic skiing (Para cross-country skiing and Para biathlon)
- Disability class: B2
Medal record
Representing Belarus
Winter Paralympics
Women's Para cross-country skiing
Gold medal – first place	2018 Pyeongchang	15km free visually impaired
Gold medal – first place	2018 Pyeongchang	1.5km sprint classical visually impaired
Women's Para biathlon
Bronze medal – third place	2018 Pyeongchang	6km visually impaired

Sviatlana Sakhanenka (born 26 October 1989) is a Belarusian visually impaired Para cross-country skier and biathlete. She made her Paralympic debut during the 2018 Winter Paralympics and she competed in the biathlon and cross-country skiing events.

Sviatlana Sakhanenka clinched her maiden gold medal in her Paralympic career after clinching the medal in the 15km free visually impaired cross-country event during the 2018 Winter Paralympics. and followed it up with another gold medal in the Cross-country skiing by claiming a gold medal in the women's 1.5km sprint classical cross-country skiing event. She also claimed a bronze medal in the women's 6km visually impaired biathlon event at the 2018 Winter Paralympics.

She won the gold medal in the women's 10 km visually impaired cross-country skiing event at the 2021 World Para Snow Sports Championships held in Lillehammer, Norway. She also won the gold medal in the women's long-distance visually impaired cross-country skiing event.
