= Anastasiia Bagiian =

Russian Para cross-country skier (born 2001)

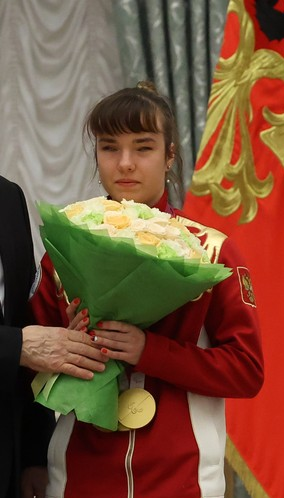
- Bagiian in 2026

Personal information
- Full name: Anastasiia Nikolayevna Bagiian
- Born: 19 October 2001 (age 24) Perm, Russia

Sport
- Country: Russia
- Sport: Para cross-country skiing
- Disability: Visually impaired
- Disability class: NS1
Medal record
Women's Para cross-country skiing
Representing Russia
Paralympic Games
Gold medal – first place	2026 Milano Cortina	Sprint visually impaired
Gold medal – first place	2026 Milano Cortina	10 km visually impaired
Gold medal – first place	2026 Milano Cortina	20 km visually impaired
Representing RPC
World Para Nordic Skiing Championships
Bronze medal – third place	2021 Lillehammer	1 km visually impaired

Anastasiia Nikolayevna Bagiian (Russian: Анастасия Николаевна Багиян; born 19 October 2001) is a Russian visually impaired Para cross-country skier. She represented Russia at the 2026 Winter Paralympics and won three gold medals.

== Early life and career ==
Bagiian was born on 19 October 2001 in Perm. Blind since 15, she trained at a sports-adaptive school from 17 and began cross-country skiing in 2018. She studies at the Chaikovsky State Institute of Physical Culture and trains at KCFK Perm under coach Arkady Turbin; her guide is Sergey Sinyakin.

== Career ==
Bagiian joined the Perm Krai team in 2019 and the Russian Paralympic team in 2021. At the 2022 World Championships, she took bronze in the 1 km sprint, and placed 4th and 6th in other races. Suspended from the 2022 Paralympics due to RPC ban (lifted end 2025), she won the Russian Cup in 2023 and the 5 km free at the 2025 Russian Championship. Overall, she has three Russian titles and five Russian Cup wins, plus two medals at the "We are together. Sport" Games.

In January 2026, Bagiian won a World Cup mass-start stage in Finsterau. At the 2026 Winter Paralympics in Milan, she won a gold medal in the visually impaired classic sprint with a time of 3:16.1, guided by Sinyakin, Russia's second gold of the Games. She is also entered in the 10 km and 20 km events. On March 11, 2026, she won her second Paralympic gold medal by winning the 10 km race with a time of 29 minutes 39.7 seconds. Four days later, she won her third gold medal in the 20 km race, finishing in 43 minutes 59.1 seconds.
