= Alexandra Rexová =

Slovak Para alpine skier (born 2005)

Personal information
- Born: 5 August 2005 (age 21) Bratislava, Slovakia

Sport
- Country: Slovakia
- Sport: Para alpine skiing
- Disability: Visually impaired
- Disability class: AS2
Medal record
Women's Para alpine skiing
Representing Slovakia
Paralympic Games
Gold medal – first place	2022 Beijing	Super-G
Bronze medal – third place	2022 Beijing	Slalom
Bronze medal – third place	2026 Milano Cortina	Downhill
Bronze medal – third place	2026 Milano Cortina	Super-G
Bronze medal – third place	2026 Milano Cortina	Slalom
World Championships
Silver medal – second place	2023 Lleida	Alpine combined
Bronze medal – third place	2023 Lleida	Downhill
Bronze medal – third place	2025 Maribor	Slalom

Alexandra Rexová (born 5 August 2005) is a Slovak visually impaired Para alpine skier. She represented Slovakia at the 2022 and 2026 Winter Paralympics.

== Career ==
Rexová represented Slovakia at the 2022 Winter Paralympics and won a gold medal in the super-G, and a bronze medal in the slalom.
