= Ivan Golubkov =

Russian Para cross-country skier and Para biathlete (born 1995)

Personal information
- Full name: Ivan Yurievich Golubkov
- Born: 4 December 1995 (age 30) Inta, Komi Republic, Russia

Sport
- Country: Russia
- Sport: Para cross-country skiing Para biathlon
- Disability class: LW11.5
Medal record
Men's Para cross-country skiing
Representing Russia
Paralympics Games
Gold medal – first place	2026 Milano Cortina	10 km sitting
Gold medal – first place	2026 Milano Cortina	20 km sitting
Representing RPC
World Championships
Gold medal – first place	2021 Lillehammer	1 km
Gold medal – first place	2021 Lillehammer	10 km
Gold medal – first place	2021 Lillehammer	18 km
Gold medal – first place	2021 Lillehammer	4 × 2.5 km open relay
Men's Para biathlon
Representing RPC
World Championships
Gold medal – first place	2021 Lillehammer	6 km
Gold medal – first place	2021 Lillehammer	10 km

Ivan Yurievich Golubkov (Russian: Иван Юрьевич Голубков; born 4 December 1995) is a Russian Para cross-country skier and Para biathlete. He competes in the seated class and is classified LW11.5.

== Early life ==
Ivan Golubkov was born in Inta, Komi Republic, with spina bifida. He spent his childhood in an orphanage until he was five, and then in the Kochpon Psychoneurological Boarding School in Syktyvkar. He was a very strong and active child. He took up cross-country skiing after watching his sister Maria Iovleva, who grew up in the same orphanage with him. It was Alexander Porshnev, his first coach, who introduced him to cross-country skiing. At Porshnev's suggestion, Golubkov join a cross-country skiing club.

In March 2026, after returning from the Milano-Cortina Paralympics, he was awarded of the Order Of Friendship by President Vladimir Putin at the Kremlin.

== Career ==
Golubkov began his active career in 2010. He made his international debut at the 2013/14 Para-Cross-Country World Cup, where he finished tenth in the seated class. He also finished tenth in the 2014/15 Para-Cross-Country World Cup, and won the 2015/16 Para-Cross-Country World Cup. He won the Para-Cross-Country World Cup again in 2017/18, 2019/20, and 2020/21.

Golubkov participated in the 2021 World Para Snow Sports Championships, winning all three distances in cross-country skiing, while also winning the relay in the open relay with himself on the team. In biathlon, he also won 6 km and 10 km events and finished sixth in 12.5 km.
