= Thijn Speksnijder =

Dutch para-alpine skier (born 2000)

Personal information
- Born: 3 April 2000 (age 26) Geldermalsen, Netherlands

Sport
- Country: Netherlands
- Sport: Para-alpine skiing
- Disability class: LW12-1
- Events: Downhill, Super-G, Giant slalom, Slalom, Alpine combined

Achievements and titles
- Paralympic finals: Milan-Cortina 2026

Thijn Speksnijder (born 3 April 2000) is a Dutch para-alpine skier who competes in the sitting classification. He represented the Netherlands at the 2026 Winter Paralympics.

== Biography ==
=== Early life ===
Speksnijder was born in Geldermalsen, Netherlands, and grew up in Beesd. He was born with spina bifida occulta, a congenital condition that left him unable to walk. He began skiing at a young age and eventually discovered sit-skiing, the discipline in which he competes internationally.

Speksnijder was scouted by the Dutch Ski Federation in 2014 and subsequently joined development programmes within the national para-alpine skiing team. Competing in a sit-ski, he focused on technical disciplines such as slalom and giant slalom, while also training for speed events including downhill and super-G.

=== Career ===
Speksnijder competed internationally in para-alpine skiing events during the early 2020s and was part of the Dutch talent team. He won two European bronze medals in slalom and super-G and continued to develop his technique while training with the national selection.

During the qualification period for the 2026 Winter Paralympics, Speksnijder competed in several World Cup races. In early 2026 he raced in Saalbach, Austria, but failed to finish four consecutive races, leaving his qualification uncertain. He later travelled to Méribel and Tignes in France to compete in additional races in an attempt to secure a qualifying result.

In February 2026 he initially appeared to miss out on qualification despite achieving a sixth-place finish in a World Cup race, because the event did not meet the minimum participation requirements for qualification. After further evaluation by the Dutch selection committee, however, he was later added to the national team and received a start place for the Paralympic Games.

At the 2026 Winter Paralympics in Cortina d'Ampezzo, Speksnijder made his Paralympic debut in the LW12-1 sitting classification. He finished tenth in the men's downhill, eleventh in the giant slalom, fourteenth in the slalom and seventeenth in the super-G, while he did not finish the alpine combined event.

== Results ==
=== Paralympic Games ===
Year	Venue	Results
2026	Italy Cortina d'Ampezzo	10th Downhill LW12-1; 11th Giant slalom LW12-1; 14th Slalom LW12-1; 17th Super-G LW12-1; DNF Alpine combined LW12-1

=== World Championships ===
Year	Venue	Results
2025	Slovenia Maribor	15th Giant slalom LW12-1; 17th Slalom LW12-1
