= Arthur Bauchet =

French Para alpine skier (born 2000)

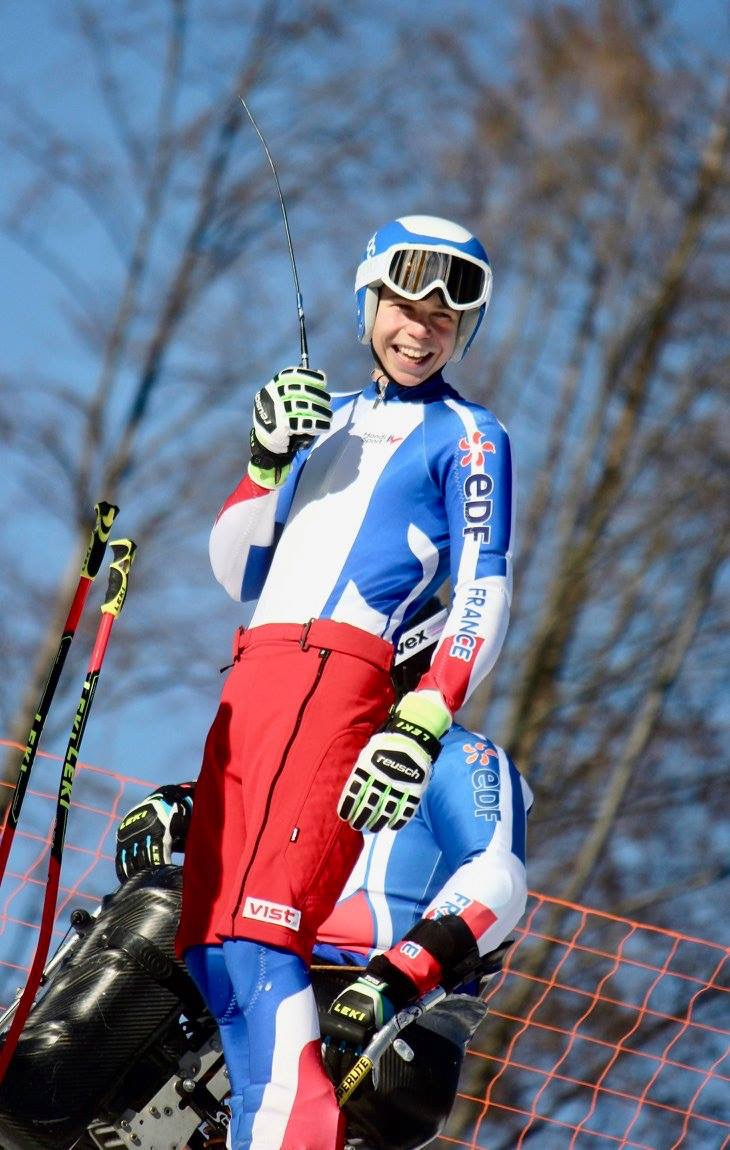
- Bauchet at the 2017 World Para Alpine Skiing Championships in Tarvisio, Italy

Personal information
- Born: 10 October 2000 (age 25) Saint-Tropez, France
- Years active: 2016–

Sport
- Country: France
- Sport: Para alpine skiing
- Disability class: LW3
- Events: Downhill; Giant slalom slalom Super-G; Super combined
- Coached by: Mickael Charriere and Johnathon from ESF in Serre Chevalier
Medal record
Men's Para alpine skiing
Representing France
Paralympic Games
Gold medal – first place	2022 Beijing	Downhill standing
Gold medal – first place	2022 Beijing	Super combined standing
Gold medal – first place	2022 Beijing	Slalom standing
Gold medal – first place	2026 Milano Cortina	Super combined standing
Gold medal – first place	2026 Milano Cortina	Giant slalom standing
Silver medal – second place	2018 Pyeongchang	Downhill standing
Silver medal – second place	2018 Pyeongchang	Slalom standing
Silver medal – second place	2018 Pyeongchang	Super-G standing
Silver medal – second place	2018 Pyeongchang	Super combined standing
Silver medal – second place	2026 Milano Cortina	Downhill standing
Bronze medal – third place	2022 Beijing	Giant slalom standing
World Championships
Gold medal – first place	2017 Tarvisio	Giant slalom standing
Gold medal – first place	2017 Tarvisio	Slalom standing
Gold medal – first place	2019 Sella Nevea	Slalom standing
Gold medal – first place	2019 Sella Nevea	Super combined standing
Gold medal – first place	2019 Sella Nevea	Giant slalom standing
Gold medal – first place	2021 Lillehammer	Slalom standing
Gold medal – first place	2021 Lillehammer	Super combined standing
Gold medal – first place	2023 Lleida	Alpine combined standing
Gold medal – first place	2023 Lleida	Giant slalom standing
Gold medal – first place	2023 Lleida	Slalom standing
Gold medal – first place	2025 Maribor	Giant slalom standing
Gold medal – first place	2025 Maribor	Slalom standing
Silver medal – second place	2017 Tarvisio	Super-G standing
Silver medal – second place	2019 Sella Nevea	Super-G standing
Silver medal – second place	2021 Lillehammer	Downhill standing
Silver medal – second place	2021 Lillehammer	Giant slalom standing
Bronze medal – third place	2019 Sella Nevea	Downhill standing
Bronze medal – third place	2023 Lleida	Super-G standing
World University Games
Gold medal – first place	2025 Turin	Giant slalom standing
Silver medal – second place	2025 Turin	Super-G standing

Arthur Bauchet (born 10 October 2000) is a French Para alpine skier.

== Career ==
He represented France at the 2018 Winter Paralympics and won four silver medals.

He competed at the 2021 World Para Snow Sports Championships and won gold medals in the super combined and slalom standing events, and silver medals in the downhill and giant slalom standing events.

He represented France at the 2022 Winter Paralympics and won three gold medals and a bronze medal.
