= 2021 World Para Snow Sports Championships =

Sport competition held in Lillehammer, Norway

- Host city: Lillehammer
- Country: Norway
- Edition: 1
- Nations: 42
- Athletes: 852
- Sport: 4
- Opening: 12 January 2022
- Closing: 23 January 2022
- Dates: 8 to 23 January 2022

The 2021 World Para Snow Sports Championships was an international disability sport competition held in Lillehammer, Norway from 8 to 23 January 2022. It was the inaugural edition of the World Para Snow Sports Championships with para-alpine skiing, para cross-country skiing, para biathlon and para snowboard being held. It was scheduled for 7 to 20 February 2021 but it was postponed due to the COVID-19 pandemic in Norway. The rescheduled event retained 2021 in its name.

The biathlon and cross-country skiing events were held at the Birkebeineren Ski Stadium and the alpine skiing and snowboard events were held at Hafjell.

== Sports ==
The following competitions were held:

- Alpine skiing (32 medal events, of which 18 speed events: Downhill, Super-G, Super combined and 14 technical events: Slalom, giant slalom, Parallel Event)
- Biathlon (18 medal events)
- Cross-country skiing (20 medal events)
- Snowboard (14 medal events)

In total, 84 medal events were contested.

== Medal summary ==
=== Alpine skiing ===
Men's events:

Event	Class	Gold	Time	Silver	Time	Bronze	Time
Downhill	Visually impaired	Hyacinthe Deleplace (FRA); Guide: Valentin Giraud Moine	1:09.88	Miroslav Haraus (SVK); Guide: Maros Hudik	1:12.73	Jakub Krako (SVK); Guide: Branislav Brozman	1:13.11
Downhill	Sitting	Jesper Pedersen (NOR)	1:12.85	Jeroen Kampschreur (NED)	1:14.51	Andrew Kurka (USA)	1:15.80
Downhill	Standing	Markus Salcher (AUT)	1:12.00	Arthur Bauchet (FRA)	1:12.38	Alexey Bugaev (RPC)	1:13.94
Super-G	Visually impaired	Hyacinthe Deleplace (FRA); Guide: Valentin Giraud Moine	1:05.79	Johannes Aigner (AUT); Guide: Matteo Fleischmann	1:06.05	Miroslav Haraus (SVK); Guide: Maros Hudik	1:08.86
Super-G	Sitting	Jeroen Kampschreur (NED)	1:04.38	Jesper Pedersen (NOR)	1:07.60	Rene de Silvestro (ITA)	1:08.52
Super-G	Standing	Markus Salcher (AUT)	1:06.37	Alexey Bugaev (RPC)	1:07.76	Théo Gmür (SUI)	1:07.87
Giant slalom	Visually impaired	Giacomo Bertagnolli (ITA); Guide: Andrea Ravelli	2:14.17	Johannes Aigner (AUT); Guide: Matteo Fleischmann	2:15.46	Hyacinthe Deleplace (FRA); Guide: Maxime Jourdan	2:17.92
Giant slalom	Sitting	Jesper Pedersen (NOR)	2:14.42	Igor Sikorski (POL)	2:20.93	Andrew Kurka (USA)	2:21.25
Giant slalom	Standing	Alexey Bugaev (RPC)	2:15.04	Arthur Bauchet (FRA)	2:15.18	Théo Gmür (SUI)	2:17.85
Slalom	Visually impaired	Johannes Aigner (AUT); Guide: Matteo Fleischmann	1:28.18	Giacomo Bertagnolli (ITA); Guide: Andrea Ravelli	1:28.29	Jakub Krako (SVK); Guide: Branislav Brozman	1:29.22
Slalom	Sitting	Jesper Pedersen (NOR)	1:27.61	Victor Pierrel (FRA)	1:30.28	Niels de Langen (NED)	1:31.37
Slalom	Standing	Arthur Bauchet (FRA)	1:25.47	Adam Hall (NZL)	1:30.20	Alexander Alyabyev (RPC)	1:31.77
Super combined	Visually impaired	Hyacinthe Deleplace (FRA); Guide: Maxime Jourdan	1:51.92	Neil Simpson (GBR); Guide: Andrew Simpson	1:52.82	Miroslav Haraus (SVK); Guide: Maros Hudik	1:53.25
Super combined	Sitting	Rene de Silvestro (ITA)	1:53.65	Jesper Pedersen (NOR)	1:53.83	Niels de Langen (NED)	1:56.18
Super combined	Standing	Arthur Bauchet (FRA)	1:49.22	Alexey Bugaev (RPC)	1:50.06	Federico Pelizzari (ITA)	1:54.17
Parallel event	All classes	Johannes Aigner (AUT); Guide: Matteo Fleischmann		Giacomo Bertagnolli (ITA); Guide: Andrea Ravelli		Alexey Bugaev (RPC)	

Women's events:

Event	Class	Gold	Time	Silver	Time	Bronze	Time
Downhill	Visually impaired	Henrieta Farkašová (SVK); Guide: Michal Cerven	1:17.78	Linda Le Bon (BEL); Guide: Pierre Couquelet	1:24.99	Sara Choi (KOR); Guide: Kim Yooseong	1:27.22
Downhill	Sitting	Anna-Lena Forster (GER)	1:23.33	Barbara van Bergen (NED)	1:24.78	Katie Combaluzier (CAN)	1:38.95
Downhill	Standing	Marie Bochet (FRA)	1:16.95	Varvara Voronchikhina (RPC)	1:17.38	Mollie Jepsen (CAN)	1:18.67
Super-G	Visually impaired	Henrieta Farkašová (SVK); Guide: Michal Cerven	1:11.80	Linda Le Bon (BEL); Guide: Pierre Couquelet	1:23.99	Millie Knight (GBR); Guide: Brett Wild	1:24.02
Super-G	Sitting	Anna-Lena Forster (GER)	1:19.91	Shona Brownlee (GBR)	1:37.45	Not awarded	
Super-G	Standing	Varvara Voronchikhina (RPC)	1:11.23	Mollie Jepsen (CAN)	1:11.68	Marie Bochet (FRA)	1:11.80
Giant slalom	Visually impaired	Barbara Aigner (AUT); Guide: Klara Sykora	2:32.26	Henrieta Farkašová (SVK); Guide: Eva Trajcikova	2:32.69	Elina Stary (AUT); Guide: Celine Arthofer	2:38.58
Giant slalom	Sitting	Laurie Stephens (USA)	3:10.09	Katie Combaluzier (CAN)	3:10.97	Shona Brownlee (GBR)	3:29.48
Giant slalom	Standing	Marie Bochet (FRA)	2:30.65	Varvara Voronchikhina (RPC)	2:31.25	Mollie Jepsen (CAN)	2:31.44
Slalom	Visually impaired	Menna Fitzpatrick (GBR); Guide: Katie Guest	1:29.87	Elina Stary (AUT); Guide: Celine Arthofer	1:30.40	Martina Vozza (ITA); Guide: Ylenia Sabidussi	1:33.85
Slalom	Sitting	Anna-Lena Forster (GER)	1:41.38	Nette Kiviranta (FIN)	1:55.79	Laurie Stephens (USA)	2:12.32
Slalom	Standing	Ebba Årsjö (SWE)	1:27.30	Varvara Voronchikhina (RPC)	1:31.74	Michaela Gosselin (CAN)	1:40.49
Super combined	Visually impaired	Millie Knight (GBR); Guide: Brett Wild	2:12.10	Menna Fitzpatrick (GBR); Guide: Katie Guest	2:12.62	Sara Choi (KOR); Guide: Kim Yooseong	2:18.02
Super combined	Sitting	Anna-Lena Forster (GER)	2:11.16	Katie Combaluzier (CAN)	2:47.84	Not awarded	
Super combined	Standing	Varvara Voronchikhina (RPC)	1:58.72	Marie Bochet (FRA)	1:59.68	Anna-Maria Rieder (GER)	2:08.47
Parallel event	All classes	Ebba Årsjö (SWE)		Varvara Voronchikhina (RPC)		Elina Stary (AUT); Guide: Celine Arthofer	

=== Biathlon ===
Men's events:

Event	Class	Gold	Time	Silver	Time	Bronze	Time
6 km	Visually impaired	Yury Holub (BLR); Guide: Uladzimir Chapelin	15:03.5	Stanislav Chokhlaev (RPC); Guide: Oleg Kolodiichuk	15:45.3	Oleksandr Kazik (UKR); Guide: Serhii Kucheriavyi	15:57.7
6 km	Sitting	Ivan Golubkov (RPC)	18:38.8	Vasyl Kravchuk (UKR)	19:00.0	Taras Rad (UKR)	19:02.9
6 km	Standing	Vladislav Lekomtsev (RPC)	14:49.0	Aleksandr Pronkov (RPC)	15:23.6	Grygorii Vovchynskyi (UKR)	15:26.9
10 km	Visually impaired	Yury Holub (BLR); Guide: Uladzimir Chapelin	26:41.5	Stanislav Chokhlaev (RPC); Guide: Oleg Kolodiichuk	27:55.6	Oleg Ponomarev (RPC); Guide: Andrei Romanov	29:11.8
10 km	Sitting	Ivan Golubkov (RPC)	32:16.2	Taras Rad (UKR)	32:59.3	Danila Britik (RPC)	32:59.8
10 km	Standing	Vladislav Lekomtsev (RPC)	25:35.2	Aleksandr Pronkov (RPC)	27:02.1	Benjamin Daviet (FRA)	27:15.4
12.5 km	Visually impaired	Stanislav Chokhlaev (RPC); Guide: Oleg Kolodiichuk	35:46.0	Anatolii Kovalevskyi (UKR); Guide: Oleksandr Mukshyn	37:14.5	Oleksandr Kazik (UKR); Guide: Serhii Kucheriavyi	37:50.6
12.5 km	Sitting	Pavlo Bal (UKR)	46:53.0	Aaron Pike (USA)	47:16.0	Danila Britik (RPC)	47:18.2
12.5 km	Standing	Vladislav Lekomtsev (RPC)	34:36.4	Vitalii Malyshev (RPC)	36:02.1	Benjamin Daviet (FRA)	36:22.9

Women's events:

Event	Class	Gold	Time	Silver	Time	Bronze	Time
6 km	Visually impaired	Vera Khlyzova (RPC); Guide: Natalia Iakimova	16:56.6	Ekaterina Razumnaia (RPC); Guide: Alexey Ivanov	17:51.2	Anna Panferova (RPC); Guide: Andrei Zhukov	18:19.6
6 km	Sitting	Anja Wicker (GER)	21:51.2	Oksana Masters (USA)	21:52.8	Natalia Kocherova (RPC)	22:53.7
6 km	Standing	Oleksandra Kononova (UKR)	17:35.6	Liudmyla Liashenko (UKR)	17:58.9	Iuliia Batenkova (UKR)	18:16.5
10 km	Visually impaired	Vera Khlyzova (RPC); Guide: Natalia Iakimova	30:16.7	Ekaterina Razumnaia (RPC); Guide: Alexey Ivanov	32:31.6	Margarita Tereshchenkova (RPC); Guide: Anton Podzorov	33:03.8
10 km	Sitting	Kendall Gretsch (USA)	36:44.7	Natalia Kocherova (RPC)	39:09.6	Oksana Masters (USA)	39:46.3
10 km	Standing	Liudmyla Liashenko (UKR)	31:23.8	Iryna Bui (UKR)	31:54.8	Oleksandra Kononova (UKR)	32:41.7
12.5 km	Visually impaired	Vera Khlyzova (RPC); Guide: Natalia Iakimova	40:13.7	Ekaterina Razumnaia (RPC); Guide: Alexey Ivanov	41:20.8	Margarita Tereshchenkova (RPC); Guide: Anton Podzorov	43:30.8
12.5 km	Sitting	Kendall Gretsch (USA)	52:25.0	Natalia Kocherova (RPC)	54:16.8	Oksana Masters (USA)	55:25.7
12.5 km	Standing	Iryna Bui (UKR)	41:08.7	Oleksandra Kononova (UKR)	46:26.8	Liudmyla Liashenko (UKR)	46:57.8

=== Cross-country skiing ===
Men's events:

Event	Class	Gold	Time	Silver	Time	Bronze	Time
1 km	Visually impaired	Oleg Ponomarev (RPC); Guide: Andrei Romanov	3:00.77	Jake Adicoff (USA); Guide: Sam Wood	3:03.76	Vladimir Udaltsov (RPC); Guide: Ruslan Bogachev	3:08.40
1 km	Sitting	Ivan Golubkov (RPC)	2:27.28	Cristian Ribera (BRA)	2:24.94	Danila Britik (RPC)	2:32.70
1 km	Standing	Vladislav Lekomtsev (RPC)	2:59.60	Rushan Minnegulov (RPC)	3:01.93	Aleksandr Pronkov (RPC)	3:13.14
12.5 km	Visually impaired	Jake Adicoff (USA); Guide: Sam Wood	33:54.0	Stanislav Chokhlaev (RPC); Guide: Oleg Kolodiichuk	34:10.8	Yury Holub (BLR); Guide: Mikita Maslouski	34:25.5
12.5 km	Standing	Vladislav Lekomtsev (RPC)	32:29.1	Witold Skupień (POL)	32:59.9	Aleksandr Pronkov (RPC)	33:01.7
10 km	Sitting	Ivan Golubkov (RPC)	31:22.7	Giuseppe Romele (ITA)	31:52.2	Danila Britik (RPC)	33:25.6
20 km	Visually impaired	Oleg Ponomarev (RPC); Guide: Andrei Romanov	41:15.7	Stanislav Chokhlaev (RPC); Guide: Oleg Kolodiichuk	41:21.0	Jake Adicoff (USA); Guide: Sam Wood	41:41.5
20 km	Standing	Vladislav Lekomtsev (RPC)	41:41.4	Rushan Minnegulov (RPC)	42:21.0	Vitalii Malyshev (RPC)	42:24.6
18 km	Sitting	Ivan Golubkov (RPC)	51:14.5	Sin Eui-hyun (KOR)	51:42.8	Danila Britik (RPC)	52:17.4

Women's events:

Event	Class	Gold	Time	Silver	Time	Bronze	Time
1 km	Visually impaired	Anna Panferova (RPC); Guide: Andrei Zhukov	2:43.27	Sviatlana Sakhanenka (BLR); Guide: Dzmitry Budzilovich	2:44.38	Anastasiia Bagiian (RPC); Guide: Sergei Siniakin	2:48.34
1 km	Sitting	Oksana Masters (USA)	2:47.63	Valiantsina Shyts (BLR)	2:47.07	Natalia Kocherova (RPC)	3:01.41
1 km	Standing	Vilde Nilsen (NOR)	2:46.45	Sydney Peterson (USA)	2:58.10	Liudmyla Liashenko (UKR)	2:53.25
10 km	Visually impaired	Sviatlana Sakhanenka (BLR); Guide: Dzmitry Budzilovich	32:16.4	Anna Panferova (RPC); Guide: Andrei Zhukov	33:28.1	Vera Khlyzova (RPC); Guide: Natalia Iakimova	33:43.9
10 km	Standing	Vilde Nilsen (NOR)	31:02.4	Sydney Peterson (USA)	32:27.2	Liudmyla Liashenko (UKR)	32:37.1
7.5 km	Sitting	Kendall Gretsch (USA)	26:57.6	Valiantsina Shyts (BLR)	27:47.0	Anja Wicker (GER)	28:37.4
15 km	Visually impaired	Sviatlana Sakhanenka (BLR); Guide: Dzmitry Budzilovich	34:40.0	Vera Khlyzova (RPC); Guide: Natalia Iakimova	35:13.7	Anna Panferova (RPC); Guide: Andrei Zhukov	35:25.1
15 km	Sitting	Oksana Masters (USA)	46:45.2	Kendall Gretsch (USA)	47:54.9	Valiantsina Shyts (BLR)	48:23.5
15 km	Standing	Liudmyla Liashenko (UKR)	36:18.6	Vilde Nilsen (NOR)	36:21.3	Sydney Peterson (USA)	36:30.5

Team events:

Event	Class	Gold	Time	Silver	Time	Bronze	Time
4 × 2.5 km mixed relay	All classes	Ukraine; Taras Rad; Liudmyla Liashenko; Pavlo Bal; Liudmyla Liashenko	28:49.4	RPC; Natalia Kocherova; Vera Khlyzova; Guide: Natalia Iakimova; Alexey Bychenok; Stanislav Chokhlaev; Guide: Oleg Kolodiichuk	29:11.2	Belarus; Arkadz Shykuts; Sviatlana Sakhanenka; Guide: Dzmitry Budzilovich; Valiantsina Shyts; Mikita Ladzesau; Guide: Dzmitry Budzilovich	29:30.7
4 × 2.5 km open relay	All classes	RPC; Vitalii Malyshev; Oleg Ponomarev; Guide: Andrei Romanov; Ivan Golubkov; Vladislav Lekomtsev	24:50.7	France; Benjamin Daviet; Anthony Chalencon; Guide: Brice Ottonello; Benjamin Daviet; Anthony Chalencon; Guide: Alexandre Pouye	25:28.7	Norway; Kjartan Haugen; Vilde Nilsen; Trygve Steinar Larsen; Thomas Oxaal; Guide: Ole-Martin Lid	26:10.9

=== Snowboard ===
Men's events:

Event	Class	Gold	Silver	Bronze
Snowboard cross	SB-UL	Maxime Montaggioni (FRA)	James Barnes-Miller (GBR)	Mikhail Slinkin (RPC)
Snowboard cross	SB-LL1	Tyler Turner (CAN)	Mike Schultz (USA)	Tyler Burdick (USA)
Snowboard cross	SB-LL2	Matti Suur-Hamari (FIN)	Ben Tudhope (AUS)	Evan Strong (USA)
Dual Banked Slalom	SB-UL	Maxime Montaggioni (FRA)	Jacopo Luchini (ITA)	James Barnes-Miller (GBR)
Dual Banked Slalom	SB-LL1	Noah Elliott (USA)	Mike Schultz (USA)	Tyler Turner (CAN)
Dual Banked Slalom	SB-LL2	Zach Miller (USA)	Alex Massie (CAN)	Ben Tudhope (AUS)
Team event	All classes	Canada; Alex Massie; Tyler Turner	Japan; Takahito Ichikawa; Masataka Oiwane	Great Britain; Ollie Hill; James Barnes-Miller

Women's events:

Event	Class	Gold	Silver	Bronze
Snowboard cross	SB-UL	Monika Kotzian (POL)	Not awarded	Not awarded
Snowboard cross	SB-LL1	Cécile Hernandez (FRA)	Brenna Huckaby (USA)	Ellen Walther (SUI)
Snowboard cross	SB-LL2	Lisa Bunschoten (NED)	Lisa DeJong (CAN)	Renske van Beek (NED)
Dual Banked Slalom	SB-UL	Monika Kotzian (POL)	Irati Idiakez (ESP)	Not awarded
Dual Banked Slalom	SB-LL1	Brenna Huckaby (USA)	Cécile Hernandez (FRA)	Ellen Walther (SUI)
Dual Banked Slalom	SB-LL2	Lisa Bunschoten (NED)	Lisa DeJong (CAN)	Sandrine Hamel (CAN)
Team event	All classes	Canada; Lisa DeJong; Sandrine Hamel	Netherlands; Lisa Bunschoten; Renske van Beek	Switzerland; Romy Tschopp; Ellen Walther

=== Medal table ===
* Host nation (Host nation (Norway))

Rank	Nation	Gold	Silver	Bronze	Total
1	RPC (RPC)	22	23	22	67
2	United States (USA)	10	9	9	28
3	France (FRA)	10	6	4	20
4	Ukraine (UKR)	6	6	9	21
5	Austria (AUT)	5	3	2	10
6	Norway (NOR)*	5	3	1	9
7	Germany (GER)	5	0	2	7
8	Belarus (BLR)	4	3	3	10
9	Canada (CAN)	3	6	6	15
10	Netherlands (NED)	3	3	3	9
11	Great Britain (GBR)	2	4	4	10
12	Italy (ITA)	2	4	3	9
13	Slovakia (SVK)	2	2	4	8
14	Poland (POL)	2	2	0	4
15	Sweden (SWE)	2	0	0	2
16	Finland (FIN)	1	1	0	2
17	Belgium (BEL)	0	2	0	2
18	South Korea (KOR)	0	1	2	3
19	Australia (AUS)	0	1	1	2
20	Brazil (BRA)	0	1	0	1
20	Japan (JPN)	0	1	0	1
20	New Zealand (NZL)	0	1	0	1
20	Spain (ESP)	0	1	0	1
24	Switzerland (SUI)	0	0	5	5
Totals (24 entries)		84	83	80	247
