= Jordan Broisin =

French para-alpine skier (born 1993)

Personal information
- Born: 4 August 1993 (age 32) Annecy, France

Sport
- Country: France
- Sport: Para-alpine skiing
- Disability class: LW4
Medal record
Men's para-alpine skiing
Representing France
World Championships
| Silver medal – second place | 2023 Lleida | Slalom standing |

Jordan Broisin (born 4 August 1993) is a French para-alpine skier. He is a three-time Paralympian.

== Career ==
Broisin competed at the 2023 World Para Alpine Skiing Championships and won a silver medal in the slalom standing event with a time of 1:46:96 in a French podium sweep.

In February 2026, he was selected to represent France at the 2026 Winter Paralympics, where he will serve as the flagbearer during the 2026 Winter Paralympics Parade of Nations.
