= Federico Pelizzari =

Italian Para alpine skier (born 2000)

Personal information
- Born: 14 August 2000 (age 26) Lecco, Italy

Sport
- Country: Italy
- Sport: Para alpine skiing
- Disability class: LW6/8-2
Medal record
Men's Para alpine skiing
Representing Italy
Paralympic Games
Silver medal – second place	2026 Milano Cortina	Super combined standing
World Championships
Bronze medal – third place	2021 Lillehammer	Super combined, standing
Bronze medal – third place	2023 Lleida	Giant slalom, standing

Federico Pelizzari (born 14 August 2000) is an Italian Para alpine skier who competed at the 2022 Winter Paralympics.

== Career ==
He made his international debut at the 2021 World Para Snow Sports Championships and won a bronze medal in the super combined standing event.

He represented Italy at the 2022 Winter Paralympics and finished in fourth place in the giant slalom standing event.
