= Oscar Burnham =

French para-alpine skier (born 1999)

Oscar Burnham (Oscarisme)
Personal information
- Born: 30 April 1999 (age 27)

Sport
- Country: France
- Sport: Para-alpine skiing
- Disability class: LW6/8
Medal record
Men's para-alpine skiing
Representing France
World Championships
Bronze medal – third place	2023 Lleida	Slalom standing
World University Games
Gold medal – first place	2025 Turin	Super-G standing
Bronze medal – third place	2025 Turin	Giant slalom standing

Oscar Burnham (born 30 April 1999) is a French para-alpine skier. He represented France at the 2022 Winter Paralympics.

== Career ==
Burnham competed at the 2023 World Para Alpine Skiing Championships and won a bronze medal in the slalom standing event with a time of 1:48.03 in a French podium sweep.

He competed at the 2025 Winter World University Games in para alpine skiing and won a gold medal in the Super-G and bronze medal in the giant slalom standing events.

In February 2026, he was selected to represent France at the 2026 Winter Paralympics.
