= Robin Cuche =

Swiss Para alpine skier (born 1998)

Personal information
- Born: 21 May 1998 (age 28)

Sport
- Country: Switzerland
- Sport: Para alpine skiing
- Disability: Hemiplegic
- Disability class: LW9-1
Medal record
Men's Para alpine skiing
Representing Switzerland
Paralympic Games
Gold medal – first place	2026 Milano Cortina	Downhill standing
Gold medal – first place	2026 Milano Cortina	Super-G standing
Silver medal – second place	2026 Milano Cortina	Giant slalom standing
Bronze medal – third place	2026 Milano Cortina	Slalom standing
World Championships
Silver medal – second place	2017 Tarvisio	Super combined
Silver medal – second place	2023 Lleida	Alpine combined
Silver medal – second place	2023 Lleida	Downhill
Silver medal – second place	2023 Lleida	Super-G
Silver medal – second place	2025 Maribor	Slalom

Robin Cuche (born 21 May 1998) is a Swiss Para alpine skier. He is a four-time Paralympian.

== Career ==
Cuche joined the Swiss national team at 13 years old, and made his Paralympic debut at the 2014 Winter Paralympics. He competed at the 2017 World Para Alpine Skiing Championships and won a silver medal in the super combined event.

Cuche competed at the 2023 World Para Alpine Skiing Championships and won a silver medals in the alpine combined, downhill and Super-G events. He competed at the 2025 World Para Alpine Skiing Championships and won a silver medal in the slalom event.

He won the 2025–26 FIS Para Alpine Ski World Cup downhill crystal globe for the fourth consecutive season. In February 2026, he was selected to represent Switzerland at the 2026 Winter Paralympics. He won a gold medal in the downhill standing event with a time of 1:17.79. He also won a gold medal in the Super-G standing event with a time of 1:12.12.

== Personal life ==
Cuche's uncle, Didier Cuche, is an Olympic alpine skier.

== World Cup results ==
=== Season standings ===
Season
Season	Age	Overall	Slalom	Giant slalom	Super-G	Downhill
2014	15	37	—	32	—	—
2015	16	16	13	18	—	—
2017	18	8	16	12	5	2
2018	19	14	17	14	4	—
2019	20	8	6	—	5	—
2020	21	11	—	20	4	4
2021	22	6	7	8	8	5
2022	23	19	7	—	—	—
2023	24	2	2	1	3	1
2024	25	2	2	2	2	1
2025	26	2	7	2	16	1
2026	27	2	8	3	2	1
