= Hyacinthe Deleplace =

French Paralympic athlete

Hyacinthie Deleplace
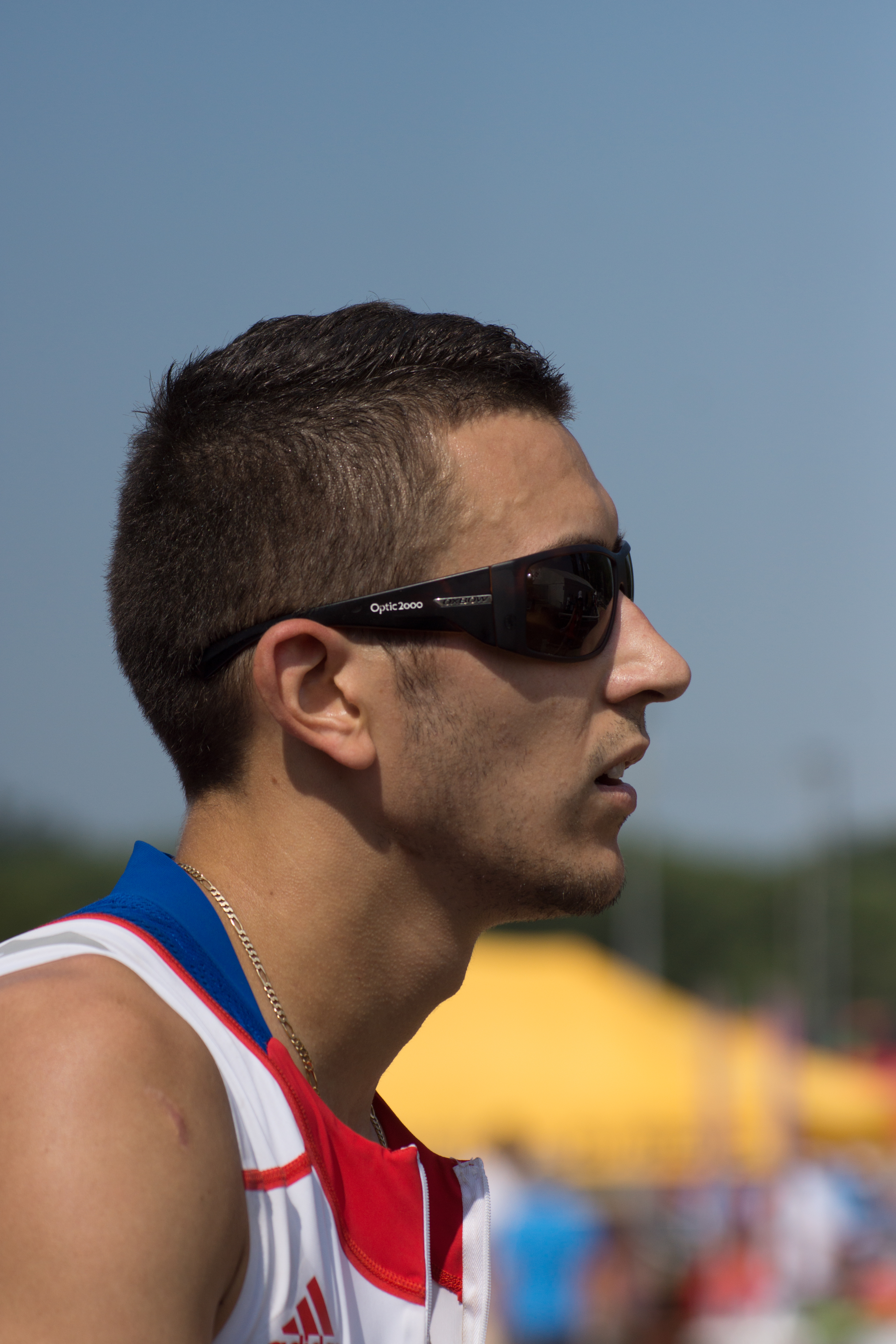
- Deleplace after the Men's 400m - T12 third semifinal.jpg

Personal information
- Nationality: French
- Born: 25 June 1989 (age 37) Villeurbanne, France

Sport
- Country: France
- Sport: Paralympic athletics
- Disability class: T12
- Event(s): Middle distance Sprint
- Club: Lyon Athletisme
- Coached by: Arthamon Germinale; Gregory Duvalle
Medal record
Paralympic athletics
Representing France
IPC World Championships
| Bronze medal – third place | 2013 Lyon | 400m - T12 |
| Bronze medal – third place | 2013 Lyon | 4x100m relay- T11-12 |
Men's para alpine skiing
Representing France
Winter Paralympics
| Bronze medal – third place | 2022 Beijing | Downhill visually impaired |
World Championships
| Gold medal – first place | 2021 Lillehammer | Downhill visually impaired |
| Gold medal – first place | 2021 Lillehammer | Super-G visually impaired |
| Gold medal – first place | 2021 Lillehammer | Super combined visually impaired |
| Silver medal – second place | 2023 Lleida | Downhill visually impaired |

Hyacinthe Deleplace (born 25 June 1989) is a visually impaired Paralympian athlete from France competing mainly in category T12 middle-distance and sprint events. He also won several medals in para-alpine skiing at the 2021 World Para Snow Sports Championships held in Lillehammer, Norway. Valentin Giraud Moine and Maxime Jourdan have competed as his sighted guide.

He won the bronze medal in the men's downhill visually impaired event at the 2022 Winter Paralympics held in Beijing, China. He also competed in each of the other visually impaired alpine skiing events at the 2022 Winter Paralympics.
