= Irati Idiakez =

Spanish Paralympic snowboarder

Personal information
- Full name: Irati Idiakez López
- Nationality: Spanish
- Born: 22 October 1996 (age 29) Getaria, Basque Country, Spain
Medal record
Women's para snowboarding
Representing Spain
World Championships
Silver medal – second place	2021 Lillehammer	Dual banked slalom

Irati Idiakez López (Note: In this Spanish name, the first or paternal surname is Idiakez and the second or maternal family name is López.) (born 22 October 1996) is a Spanish para-snowboarder who competes in the SB-UL category.

== Early life ==
Idiakez played football at a young age, then took part in sports courses in her home town of Getaria. She was not close to snowboarding until a bus accident in Chile in 2017 changed her life. She lost her right arm in that unfortunate accident. After surgery and still in rehab, she began searching for information. In order not to have any imbalances in her body, Idiakez was told that it was very important to do sports, and she turned to the Basque Adapted Sports Federation. Shortly afterwards, she received a call from the Royal Spanish Winter Sports Federation saying that they knew she had an accident and that she wanted to try them out. They organized a stay in Baqueira-Beret near Lleida, Catalonia. Until then, she didn't even realized para-snowboarding existed.

== Career ==
Idiakez won the silver medal in the women's dual banked slalom at the 2021 World Para Snow Sports Championships held in Lillehammer, Norway. She also competed in the women's snowboard cross event where she was disqualified.
