= Giacomo Bertagnolli =

Italian Para alpine skier (born 1999)

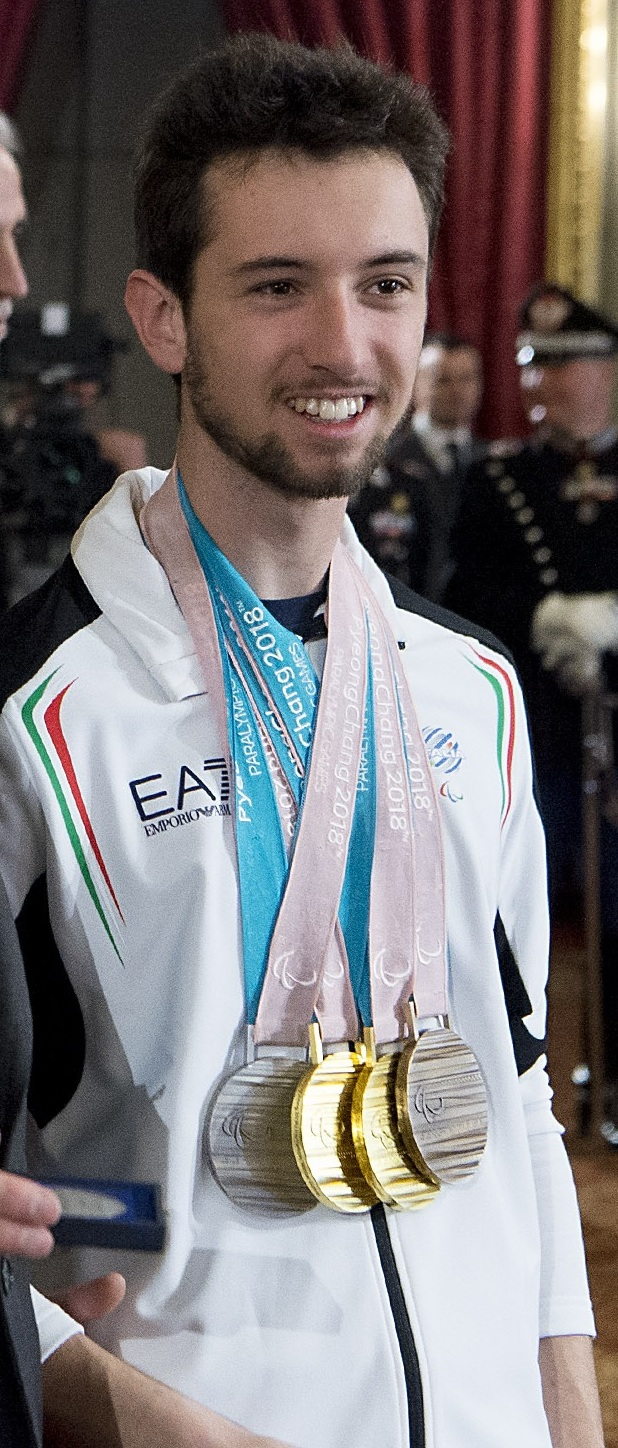
- Bertagnoli with his four medals of Pyengchang 2018

Personal information
- Born: 18 January 1999 (age 27) Cavalese, Italy

Sport
- Country: Italy
- Sport: Para alpine skiing
- Disability: Visually impaired
- Disability class: AS3
- Club: Fiamme Gialle
Medal record
Men's Para alpine skiing
Representing Italy
| Event | 1st | 2nd | 3rd |
|---|---|---|---|
| Paralympic Games | 6 | 5 | 2 |
| World Championships | 10 | 5 | 2 |
| Total | 16 | 10 | 4 |
Paralympic Games
| Gold medal – first place | 2018 Pyengchang | Giant slalom |
| Gold medal – first place | 2018 Pyengchang | Slalom |
| Gold medal – first place | 2022 Beijing | Super combined |
| Gold medal – first place | 2022 Beijing | Slalom |
| Gold medal – first place | 2026 Milano Cortina | Super combined |
| Gold medal – first place | 2026 Milano Cortina | Slalom |
| Silver medal – second place | 2018 Pyengchang | Super-G |
| Silver medal – second place | 2022 Beijing | Super-G |
| Silver medal – second place | 2022 Beijing | Giant slalom |
| Silver medal – second place | 2026 Milano Cortina | Super-G |
| Silver medal – second place | 2026 Milano Cortina | Giant slalom |
| Bronze medal – third place | 2018 Pyengchang | Downhill |
| Bronze medal – third place | 2026 Milano Cortina | Downhill |
World Championships
| Gold medal – first place | 2017 Tarvisio | Super combined |
| Gold medal – first place | 2019 Sella Nevea | Downhill |
| Gold medal – first place | 2019 Sella Nevea | Super-G |
| Gold medal – first place | 2019 Sella Nevea | Slalom |
| Gold medal – first place | 2019 Sella Nevea | Super combined |
| Gold medal – first place | 2021 Lillehammer | Giant slalom |
| Gold medal – first place | 2023 Lleida | Giant slalom |
| Gold medal – first place | 2023 Lleida | Slalom |
| Gold medal – first place | 2025 Maribor | Giant slalom |
| Gold medal – first place | 2025 Maribor | Slalom |
| Silver medal – second place | 2017 Tarvisio | Giant slalom |
| Silver medal – second place | 2019 Sella Nevea | Giant slalom |
| Silver medal – second place | 2021 Lillehammer | Slalom |
| Silver medal – second place | 2021 Lillehammer | Parallel event |
| Silver medal – second place | 2023 Lleida | Alpine combined |
| Bronze medal – third place | 2017 Tarvisio | Super-G |
| Bronze medal – third place | 2023 Lleida | Super-G |

Giacomo Bertagnolli (born 18 January 1999) is a male Italian Para alpine skier, and is a four-time Paralympic Games gold medal winner.

== Career ==
He won four medals at the 2018 Winter Paralympics three at the IPC Alpine Skiing World Championships.

In 2022, he won the gold medal in the men's giant slalom visually impaired alpine skiing event at the 2021 World Para Snow Sports Championships held in Lillehammer, Norway.

He won two silver medals at the 2022 Winter Paralympics, in the Super-G visually impaired and giant slalom visually impaired events held in Beijing, China.

== Achievements ==
| Year | Competition | Venue | Position | Event | Time | Notes |
|---|---|---|---|---|---|---|
| 2018 | Paralympics Games | (South Korea) Pyeongchang | 1st | Giant slalom visually impaired | 1:36.12 | |
| 2018 | Paralympics Games | (South Korea) Pyeongchang | 1st | Slalom visually impaired | 2:10.51 | |
| 2018 | Paralympics Games | (South Korea) Pyeongchang | 2nd | Super-G visually impaired | 1:26.29 | |
| 2018 | Paralympics Games | (South Korea) Pyeongchang | 3rd | Downhill visually impaired | 1:26.46 | |
| 2022 | Paralympics Games | (China) Beijing | | | | |
| 2022 | Paralympics Games | (China) Beijing | 2nd | Super-G visually impaired | 1:09.31 | |

== See also ==
- Italy at the 2018 Winter Paralympics
