= Para alpine skiing at the 2026 Winter Paralympics =

Para alpine skiing at the XIV Paralympic Winter Games
- Venue: Olimpia delle Tofane
- Dates: 7–15 March
- Competitors: 165 from 41 nations

Para alpine skiing was one of the competitions at the 2026 Winter Paralympics in Milan and Cortina d'Ampezzo, Italy. In total, 30 medal events were held.

== Events ==
The competition events are:

- Downhill (sitting, standing, visually impaired): women – men
- Super-G (sitting, standing, visually impaired): women – men
- Giant slalom (sitting, standing, visually impaired): women – men
- Slalom (sitting, standing, visually impaired): women – men
- Super combined (sitting, standing, visually impaired): women – men

== Schedule ==
All times are local (UTC+1).

Date	Time	Event
7 March	09:30	Women's downhill
7 March	10:50	Men's downhill
9 March	09:00	Women's super-G
9 March	10:15	Men's super-G
10 March	09:00; 13:00	Women's combined
10 March	09:40; 13:45	Men's combined
12 March	09:00; 12:30	Women's giant slalom
13 March	09:00; 13:15	Men's giant slalom
14 March	09:00; 13:00	Women's slalom
15 March	10:00; 13:30	Men's slalom

== Medal summary ==
=== Medal table ===
The ranking in the table is based on information provided by the International Paralympic Committee (IPC) and will be consistent with IPC convention in its published medal tables. By default, the table will be ordered by the number of gold medals the athletes from a nation have won (in this context, a "nation" is an entity represented by a National Paralympic Committee). The number of silver medals is taken into consideration next and then the number of bronze medals. If nations are still tied, equal ranking is given and they are listed alphabetically by IPC country code.

* Host nation (Italy)

Rank	Nation	Gold	Silver	Bronze	Total
1	Austria	7	2	4	13
2	Italy*	4	7	1	12
3	Netherlands	3	2	1	6
4	Russia	3	1	3	7
5	Sweden	3	0	1	4
6	France	2	4	2	8
7	Spain	2	1	1	4
7	Switzerland	2	1	1	4
9	Germany	2	1	0	3
10	Norway	1	2	1	4
11	China	1	1	5	7
12	Japan	0	2	1	3
13	Canada	0	1	4	5
14	Poland	0	1	1	2
14	United States	0	1	1	2
16	Finland	0	1	0	1
16	Great Britain	0	1	0	1
16	New Zealand	0	1	0	1
19	Slovakia	0	0	3	3
Totals (19 entries)		30	30	30	90

=== Women's events ===
Event	Class	Gold		Silver		Bronze	
Downhill	visually impaired	Veronika Aigner; Guide: Lilly Sammer; Austria	1:22.55	Chiara Mazzel; Guide: Nicola Cotti Cottini; Italy	1:23.03	Alexandra Rexová; Guide: Sophia Polák; Slovakia	1:27.45
Downhill	sitting	Anna-Lena Forster; Germany	1:25.79	Audrey Pascual; Spain	1:25.84	Liu Sitong; China	1:31.27
Downhill	standing	Ebba Årsjö; Sweden	1:22.00	Aurélie Richard; France	1:23.71	Varvara Voronchikhina; Russia	1:24.47
Super-G	visually impaired	Chiara Mazzel; Guide: Nicola Cotti Cottini; Italy	1:14.84	Veronika Aigner; Guide: Lilly Sammer; Austria	1:15.44	Alexandra Rexová; Guide: Sophia Polák; Slovakia	1:19.69
Super-G	sitting	Audrey Pascual; Spain	1:17.82	Momoka Muraoka; Japan	1:24.14	Liu Sitong; China	1:24.91
Super-G	standing	Varvara Voronchikhina; Russia	1:15.60	Aurélie Richard; France	1:17.56	Ebba Årsjö; Sweden	1:17.64
Giant slalom	visually impaired	Veronika Aigner; Guide: Eric Digruber; Austria	2:18.63	Chiara Mazzel; Guide: Nicola Cotti Cottini; Italy	2:21.19	Elina Stary; Guide: Stefan Winter; Austria	2:25.30
Giant slalom	sitting	Anna-Lena Forster; Germany	2:30.64	Momoka Muraoka; Japan	2:31.92	Liu Sitong; China	2:34.79
Giant slalom	standing	Ebba Årsjö; Sweden	2:22.42	Varvara Voronchikhina; Russia	2:25.26	Aurélie Richard; France	2:27.04
Slalom	visually impaired	Veronika Aigner; Guide: Lilly Sammer; Austria	1:22.73	Elina Stary; Guide: Stefan Winter; Austria	1:26.77	Alexandra Rexová; Guide: Sophia Polak; Slovakia	1:31.97
Slalom	sitting	Zhang Wenjing; China	1:27.69	Nette Kiviranta; Finland	1:27.96	Audrey Pascual; Spain	1:28.04
Slalom	standing	Varvara Voronchikhina; Russia	1:26.95	Zhu Wenjing; China	1:28.44	Michaela Gosselin; Canada	1:29.19
Super combined	visually impaired	Veronika Aigner; Guide: Lilly Sammer; Austria	2:01.75	Chiara Mazzel; Guide: Nicola Cotti Cottini; Italy	2:04.81	Elina Stary; Guide: Stefan Winter; Austria	2:05.65
Super combined	sitting	Audrey Pascual; Spain	2:11.22	Anna-Lena Forster; Germany	2:11.68	Liu Sitong; China	2:14.53
Super combined	standing	Ebba Årsjö; Sweden	2:00.15	Aurélie Richard; France	2:07.18	Zhu Wenjing; China	2:10.69

=== Men's events ===
Event	Class	Gold		Silver		Bronze	
Downhill	visually impaired	Johannes Aigner; Guide: Nico Haberl; Austria	1:16.08	Kalle Ericsson; Guide: Sierra Smith; Canada	1:18.33	Giacomo Bertagnolli; Guide: Andrea Ravelli; Italy	1:18.64
Downhill	sitting	Jesper Pedersen; Norway	1:18.14	Niels de Langen; Netherlands	1:19.24	Kurt Oatway; Canada	1:19.42
Downhill	standing	Robin Cuche; Switzerland	1:17.79	Arthur Bauchet; France	1:18.40	Alexey Bugaev; Russia	1:18.94
Super-G	visually impaired	Johannes Aigner; Guide: Nico Haberl; Austria	1:11.99	Giacomo Bertagnolli; Guide: Andrea Ravelli; Italy	1:12.15	Kalle Ericsson; Guide: Sierra Smith; Canada	1:13.29
Super-G	sitting	Jeroen Kampschreur; Netherlands	1:13.08	Jesper Pedersen; Norway	1:13.80	Andrew Kurka; United States	1:13.95
Super-G	standing	Robin Cuche; Switzerland	1:12.12	Patrick Halgren; United States	1:13.10	Jules Segers; France	1:13.59
Giant slalom	visually impaired	Johannes Aigner; Guide: Nico Haberl; Austria	2:07.83	Giacomo Bertagnolli; Guide: Andrea Ravelli; Italy	2:08.17	Michał Gołaś; Guide: Kacper Walas; Poland	2:09.91
Giant slalom	sitting	René De Silvestro; Italy	2:10.44	Niels de Langen; Netherlands	2:11.01	Jesper Pedersen; Norway	2:14.59
Giant slalom	standing	Arthur Bauchet; France	2:07.76	Robin Cuche; Switzerland	2:09.72	Alexey Bugaev; Russia	2:11.14
Slalom	visually impaired	Giacomo Bertagnolli; Guide: Andrea Ravelli; Italy	1:29.29	Michał Gołaś; Guide: Kacper Walas; Poland	1:29.56	Kalle Ericsson; Guide: Sierra Smith; Canada	1:31.26
Slalom	sitting	Jeroen Kampschreur; Netherlands	1:29.72	Jesper Pedersen; Norway	1:31.11	Takeshi Suzuki; Japan	1:31.30
Slalom	standing	Alexey Bugaev; Russia	1:28.55	Adam Hall; New Zealand	1:31.38	Robin Cuche; Switzerland	1:31.73
Super combined	visually impaired	Giacomo Bertagnolli; Guide: Andrea Ravelli; Italy	1:56.42	Neil Simpson; Guide: Rob Poth; Great Britain	1:57.07	Johannes Aigner; Guide: Nico Haberl; Austria	1:57.46
Super combined	sitting	Jeroen Kampschreur; Netherlands	1:56.33	René De Silvestro; Italy	1:56.44	Niels de Langen; Netherlands	1:57.59
Super combined	standing	Arthur Bauchet; France	1:58.17	Federico Pelizzari; Italy	1:59.37	Thomas Grochar; Austria	1:59.99

== Participating nations ==
- Andorra (1)
- Argentina (1)
- Australia (4)
- Austria (11)
- Belgium (3)
- Bosnia and Herzegovina (1)
- Bulgaria (1)
- Canada (7)
- Chile (1)
- China (13)
- Croatia (4)
- Czech Republic (4)
- Denmark (1)
- Finland (2)
- France (10)
- Germany (7)
- Great Britain (6)
- Greece (1)
- Israel (1)
- Italy (7)
- Japan (5)
- Liechtenstein (1)
- Mexico (1)
- Mongolia (1)
- Netherlands (5)
- New Zealand (2)
- Norway (4)
- Poland (2)
- Puerto Rico (1)
- Romania (1)
- Russia (2)
- Serbia (1)
- Slovakia (5)
- Slovenia (1)
- South Korea (4)
- Spain (5)
- Sweden (4)
- Switzerland (8)
- Ukraine (1)
- United States (23)
- Uzbekistan (2)

== See also ==
- Alpine skiing at the 2026 Winter Olympics
