= Russian Paralympic Committee =

National Paralympic Committee of Russia

National Paralympic Committee
- Country: Russia
- Code: RUS
- Created: 1996
- Continental association: EPC
- Headquarters: Moscow, Russia
- President: Pavel Rozhkov
- Secretary General: Andrey Strokin
- Website: www.paralymp.ru

The Russian Paralympic Committee (Russian: Паралимпийский комитет России, romanized: Paralimpiyskiy komitet Rossii) is the National Paralympic Committee representing Russia.

== History ==
The Russian Paralympic Committee was founded in 1996.

On 7 August 2016, it was suspended by the International Paralympic Committee due to the state-sponsored doping scandal. This banned Russian athletes from the 2016 Summer Paralympics and required them to participate as Neutral Paralympic Athletes at the 2018 Winter Paralympics.

== 2020 Tokyo Paralympics ==
On 9 December 2019, the World Anti-Doping Agency (WADA) banned Russia from all international sport for four years, after it was found that data provided by the Russian Anti-Doping Agency had been manipulated by Russian authorities with a goal of protecting athletes involved in its state-sponsored doping scheme. Russian athletes would be allowed to participate in the Paralympics under a neutral flag and with a neutral designation, matching the 2018 Winter Paralympics.

Russia later appealed against the WADA decision in the Court of Arbitration for Sport (CAS). On 17 December 2020, the CAS announced its decision, reducing the suspension to two years and allowing Russian athletes to use the Russian national colours but a non-national flag, anthem, and designation to be approved by the International Paralympic Committee. This effectively covered the 2020 and 2022 Paralympics.

In April 2021, the International Paralympic Committee (IPC) approved that the Russian designation's name would be "RPC" (but that the full name "Russian Paralympic Committee" could not be used), and that the anthem used would be Pyotr Tchaikovsky's Piano Concerto No. 1. The actual emblem of the Russian Paralympic Committee could not be used due to it prominently featuring the Russian national flag, so a different flame-shaped emblem was specially created for the two Games.

== Impact of 2022 Russian invasion of Ukraine ==
After the 2022 Russian invasion of Ukraine, the International Olympic Committee (IOC) condemned Russia's "breach of the Olympic Truce adopted by the UN General Assembly". Following this, the International Paralympic Committee initially announced that the RPC team designation would be banned and that Russian athletes could only compete at the 2022 Winter Paralympics under a fully neutral designation as in 2018. After boycott threats from other nations, the IPC on 3 March 2022 banned Russian athletes from competing entirely. On 16 November 2022, the IPC again suspended the RPC at an extraordinary meeting of the IPC General Assembly. In September 2023 there was again partial suspension of Russian Paralympic Committee.

On 27 September 2025, the IPC General Assembly fully reinstated the membership of the RPC, with the country returning to the Paralympic Games in 2026.

In January 2026, Ukrainian President Volodymyr Zelenskyy enacted a decision imposing sanctions against the Russian Paralympic Committee for a period of 10 years.

== See also ==
- Russia at the Olympics
- Russia at the Paralympics
- Russian Olympic Committee
