= World Para Alpine Skiing Championships =

World championship

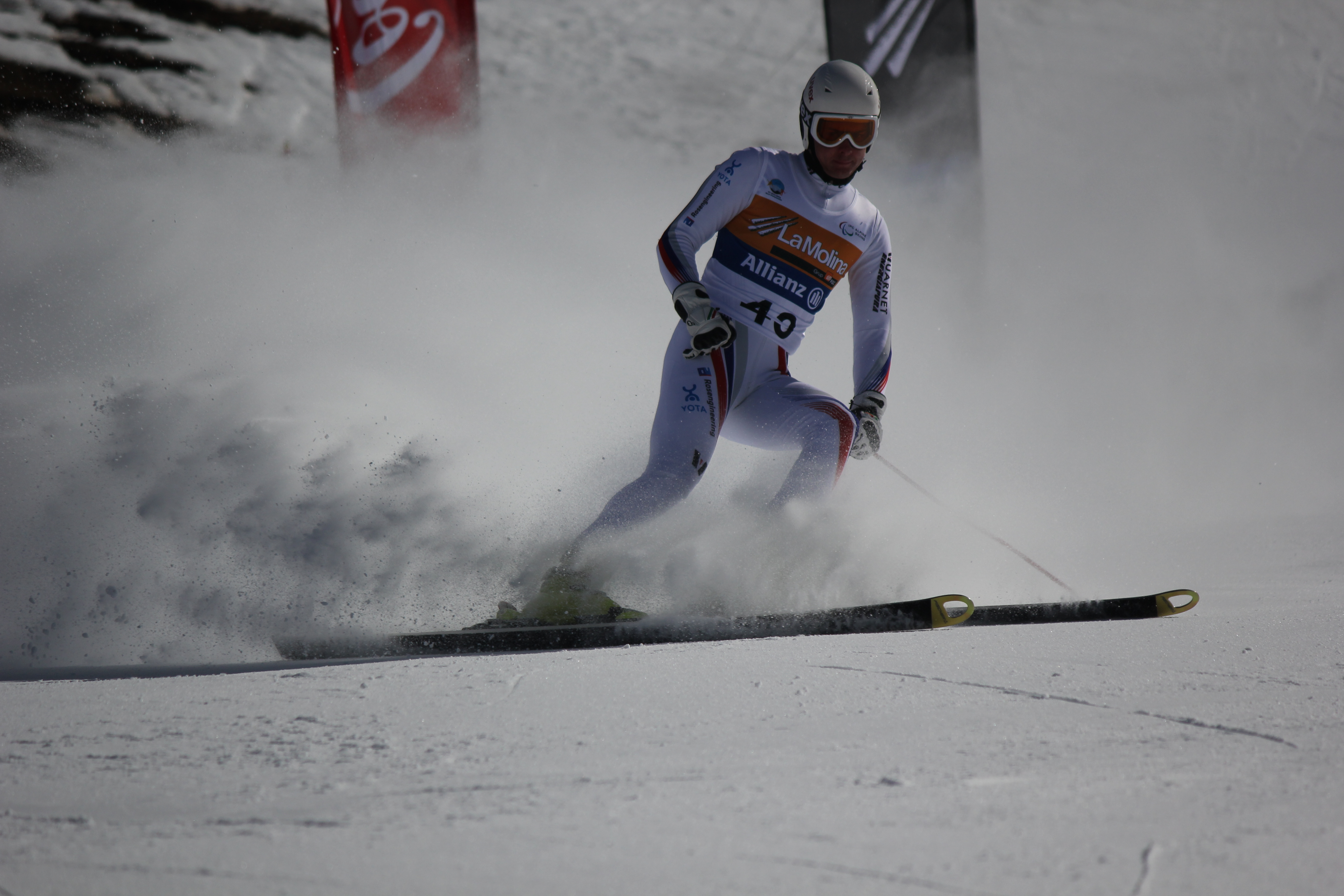
Alexandr Alyabyev of Russia. 2013 IPC Alpine World Championships at La Molina in Spain. Day 2 of competition. Super-G final.

The World Para Alpine Skiing Championships, known before the 2017 edition as the IPC Alpine Skiing World Championships, along with the Winter Paralympic Games, are the most prestigious level of international competition in Paralympic alpine skiing. First held in 1974, the World Championships have been held every four years (even-numbered non-Paralympic years) from 1982 to 2004; beginning in 2009, they have been held every other year, in odd-numbered years.

The change from holding the World Championships every four years to every two was originally set to happen in 2007. The 2007 edition was slated for Klosters, Switzerland, but organizers withdrew their bid in early 2006, citing a lack of funding. The International Paralympic Committee initially attempted to find a replacement host for the 2007 Championships but in April decided to cancel the event entirely.

On 30 November 2016, the IPC, which serves as the international governing body for Alpine skiing involving competitors with disabilities, adopted the "World Para" branding for the committees that govern all disability sports for which it serves as the international federation. Accordingly, IPC world championship events in Alpine skiing have since been known as "World Para Alpine Skiing Championships".

At the 53rd International Ski Congress in July 2022, the IPC transferred responsibility of para-alpine skiing to the International Ski and Snowboard Federation.

== Hosts ==
Year	Dates	Host	Country	Event	Notes
1972		Courchevel	France	World Winter Games	Not an official World Championships
1974		Le Grand-Bornand	France	Skiing World Championships	1st, featured alpine (downhill) and Nordic (cross-country) skiing, held by the International Sports Organisation for Disabled (ISOD)
1982		Alpes Vaudoise	Switzerland	1982 Disabled Alpine World Championships	
1986		Sälen	Sweden	1986 World Disabled Ski Championships	3rd
1990	28 February - 7 March	Winter Park, Colorado	USA	1990 Disabled Alpine World Championships	
1996		Lech	Austria	1996 Disabled Alpine World Championships	
2000		Anzère	Switzerland	2000 World Ski Championships for Disabled	6th first time the world championships for alpine and Nordic skiing were held at the same time and hosted by the same Organizing Committee, 23 nations, 500+ athletes
2004	30 January - 6 February	Wildschönau	Austria	2004 IPC Alpine Skiing World Championships	
~~2007~~		Klosters	Switzerland	Cancelled	Cancelled due to lack of funding.
2009	19 February - 1 March	Pyeongchang	South Korea	2009 IPC Alpine Skiing World Championships	
2011	14 - 23 January	Sestriere	Italy	2011 IPC Alpine Skiing World Championships	
2013	18 - 27 February	La Molina	Spain	2013 IPC Alpine Skiing World Championships	
2015	2 - 10 March	Panorama Mountain Village	Canada	2015 IPC Alpine Skiing World Championships	
2017	22 - 31 January	Tarvisio	Italy	2017 World Para Alpine Skiing Championships	
2019	21 - 24 January; 28 - 31 January	Sella Nevea/Kranjska Gora	Italy/Slovenia	2019 World Para Alpine Skiing Championships	
2022	8 - 23 January	Lillehammer	Norway	2021 World Para Snow Sports Championships	Alpine skiing, para biathlon, para cross-country and para snowboard all took place at these championships, it also served as a qualifying event for 2022 Winter Paralympics.
2023	21-29 January	Espot	Spain	2023 World Para Alpine Skiing Championships	
2025	4–11 February	Maribor	Slovenia	2025 World Para Alpine Skiing Championships	

== Medal table (2009) ==
Rank	IPC	Gold	Silver	Bronze	Total
1	Canada (CAN)	9	6	1	16
2	Germany (GER)	6	1	5	12
3	Austria (AUT)	4	7	2	13
4	Slovakia (SVK)	3	3	3	9
5	United States (USA)	3	3	1	7
6	Australia (AUS)	2	0	1	3
7	Japan (JPN)	1	4	7	12
8	Italy (ITA)	1	2	3	6
9	Spain (ESP)	1	2	1	4
10	France (FRA)	1	1	1	3
11	Switzerland (SUI)	0	1	2	3
12	New Zealand (NZL)	0	1	0	1
13	Czech Republic (CZE)	0	0	3	3
14	Belgium (BEL)	0	0	1	1
Totals (14 entries)		31	31	31	93

== See also ==
- FIS Alpine World Ski Championships
- World Junior Alpine Skiing Championships
- Alpine skiing at the Winter Olympics
- Alpine skiing at the Winter Paralympics
- Alpine skiing at the Youth Olympic Games
- Alpine skiing World Cup
- Para Alpine Skiing World Cup
