= United States at the 2026 Winter Paralympics =

- IPC code: USA

in Milan and Cortina d'Ampezzo, Italy 4 March 2026 – 15 March 2026
- Competitors: 68 in 6 sports
- Flag bearers (opening): Laurie Stephens & Josh Paul
- Flag bearers (closing): Kendall Gretsch & Andrew Kurka
- Medals Ranked 2nd: Gold 13 Silver 5 Bronze 6 Total 24

Winter Paralympics appearances (overview)
- 1976; 1980; 1984; 1988; 1992; 1994; 1998; 2002; 2006; 2010; 2014; 2018; 2022; 2026

The United States was represented at the 2026 Winter Paralympics in Milan & Cortina d'Ampezzo, Italy, which took place between 6–15 March 2026. It will be the fourteenth consecutive appearance at the Winter Paralympic Games for this country since the event in 1976.

== Medalists ==
The following U.S. competitors won medals at the games. In the by discipline sections below, medalists' names are bolded.

Medal	Name	Sport	Event	Date
Gold	Oksana Masters	Para biathlon	Women's sprint, sitting	March 7
Gold	Oksana Masters	Para cross-country skiing	Women's sprint, sitting	March 10
Gold	Jake Adicoff; Guide: Peter Wolter	Para cross-country skiing	Men's sprint, visually impaired	March 10
Gold	Oksana Masters	Para cross-country skiing	Women's 10 km, sitting	March 11
Gold	Sydney Peterson	Para cross-country skiing	Women's 10 km classical, standing	March 11
Gold	Jake Adicoff; Guide: Reid Goble	Para cross-country skiing	Men's 10 km classical, visually impaired	March 11
Gold	Kendall Gretsch	Para biathlon	Women's sprint pursuit, sitting	March 13
Gold	Noah Elliott	Para snowboard	Men's banked slalom, SB-LL1	March 13
Gold	Kate Delson	Para snowboard	Women's banked slalom, SB-LL2	March 13
Gold	Jake Adicoff; Guide: Reid Goble; Oksana Masters; Sydney Peterson; Joshua Sweeney	Para cross-country skiing	Mixed 4 × 2.5 km relay	March 14
Gold	Jake Adicoff; Guide: Reid Goble	Para cross-country skiing	Men's 20 km freestyle, visually impaired	March 15
Gold	Sydney Peterson	Para cross-country skiing	Women's 20 km freestyle, standing	March 15
Gold	United States men's national ice sledge hockey team: Kayden Beasley; Brett Bolton; Liam Cunningham; Travis Dodson; David Eustace; Declan Farmer; Griffin LaMarre; Noah Grove; Malik Jones; Jen Lee; Kevin McKee; Josh Misiewicz; Evan Nichols; Josh Pauls; Brody Roybal; Landon Uthke; Jack Wallace	Para ice hockey	Open tournament	March 15
Silver	Kendall Gretsch	Para biathlon	Women's sprint, sitting	March 7
Silver	Noah Elliott	Para snowboard	Men's snowboard cross, SB-LL1	March 8
Silver	Kate Delson	Para snowboard	Women's snowboard cross, SB-LL2	March 8
Silver	Patrick Halgren	Para alpine skiing	Men's super-G, standing	March 9
Silver	Sydney Peterson	Para cross-country skiing	Women's sprint, standing	March 10
Bronze	Kendall Gretsch	Para biathlon	Women's individual, sitting	March 8
Bronze	Andrew Kurka	Para alpine skiing	Men's super-G, sitting	March 9
Bronze	Kendall Gretsch	Para cross-country skiing	Women's 10 km, sitting	March 11
Bronze	Mike Schultz	Para snowboard	Men's banked slalom, SB-LL1	March 13
Bronze	Brenna Huckaby	Para snowboard	Women's banked slalom, SB-LL2	March 13
Bronze	Oksana Masters	Para cross-country skiing	Women's 20 km, sitting	March 15

Medals by sport
Sport	1st place, gold medalist(s)	2nd place, silver medalist(s)	3rd place, bronze medalist(s)	Total
Para cross-country skiing	8	1	2	**11**
Para snowboard	2	2	2	**6**
Para biathlon	2	1	1	**4**
Para ice hockey	1	0	0	**1**
Para alpine skiing	0	1	1	**2**
Total	13	5	6	24

Medals by day
Day	Date	1st place, gold medalist(s)	2nd place, silver medalist(s)	3rd place, bronze medalist(s)	Total
1	March 7	1	1	0	**2**
2	March 8	0	2	1	**3**
3	March 9	0	1	1	**2**
4	March 10	2	1	0	**3**
5	March 11	3	0	1	**4**
6	March 12	0	0	0	**0**
7	March 13	3	0	2	**5**
8	March 14	1	0	0	**1**
9	March 15	3	0	1	**4**
Total		13	5	6	24

Medals by gender
Gender	1st place, gold medalist(s)	2nd place, silver medalist(s)	3rd place, bronze medalist(s)	Total
Female	7	3	4	**14**
Male	5	2	2	**9**
Mixed	1	0	0	**1**
Total	13	5	6	24

Multiple medalists
Name	Sport	1st place, gold medalist(s)	2nd place, silver medalist(s)	3rd place, bronze medalist(s)	Total
Oksana Masters	Para biathlon / Para cross-country skiing	4	0	1	**5**
Jake Adicoff	Para cross-country skiing	4	0	0	**4**
Sydney Peterson	Para cross-country skiing	3	1	0	**4**
Kendall Gretsch	Para biathlon / Para cross-country skiing	1	1	2	**4**
Kate Delson	Para snowboard	1	1	0	**2**
Noah Elliott	Para snowboard	1	1	0	**2**

== Competitors ==
The following is the list of number of competitors participating at the Games per sport/discipline.

Sport	Men	Women	Total
Para alpine skiing	15	8	23
Para biathlon / Para cross-country skiing	7	6	13
Para ice hockey	17	0	17
Para snowboard	5	3	8
Wheelchair curling	4	3	7
Total	48	20	68

== Para alpine skiing ==
Men

Athlete	Event	Classification	Run 1		Run 2		Total	
Athlete	Event	Classification	Time	Rank	Time	Rank	Time	Rank
Ravi Drugan	Downhill, sitting	LW12-2	—N/a				1:26.09	8
Blake Eaton	Downhill, sitting	LW10-2	—N/a				DNF	
Robert Enigl	Downhill, sitting	LW12-1	—N/a				1:26.14	9
Andrew Kurka	Downhill, sitting	LW12-1	—N/a				DSQ	
David Williams	Downhill, sitting	LW11	—N/a				DNF	
Patrick Halgren	Downhill, standing	LW2	—N/a				DNF	
Andrew Haraghey	Downhill, standing	LW1	—N/a				1:21.30	12
Jesse Keefe	Downhill, standing	LW4	—N/a				1:21.01	10
Tyler McKenzie	Downhill, standing	LW6 / 8-1	—N/a				DNF	
Spencer Wood	Downhill, standing	LW9-2	—N/a				1:22.06	14
Matthew Brewer	Super-G, sitting	LW12-2	—N/a				1:22.03	16
Ravi Drugan	Super-G, sitting	LW12-2	—N/a				1:20.29	13
Blake Eaton	Super-G, sitting	LW10-2	—N/a				1:25.83	20
Robert Enigl	Super-G, sitting	LW12-1	—N/a				1:21.06	14
Andrew Kurka	Super-G, sitting	LW12-1	—N/a				1:13.95	3rd place, bronze medalist(s)
Patrick Halgren	Super-G, standing	LW2	—N/a				1:13.10	2nd place, silver medalist(s)
Andrew Haraghey	Super-G, standing	LW1	—N/a				DNF	
Jesse Keefe	Super-G, standing	LW4	—N/a				1:17.25	14
Tyler McKenzie	Super-G, standing	LW6 / 8-1	—N/a				1:19.90	21
Spencer Wood	Super-G, standing	LW9-2	—N/a				1:18.65	18
Matthew Brewer	Super combined, sitting	LW12-2	DNF					
Ravi Drugan	Super combined, sitting	LW12-2	1:20.46	11	48.26	12	2:08.72	11
Blake Eaton	Super combined, sitting	LW10-2	1:25.87	18	DNF			
Robert Enigl	Super combined, sitting	LW12-1	1:22.47	15	50.66	14	2:13.13	14
Andrew Kurka	Super combined, sitting	LW12-1	1:16.53	5	DNF			
Patrick Halgren	Super combined, standing	LW2	1:16.48	8	48.16	8	2:04.62	7
Andrew Haraghey	Super combined, standing	LW1	DNF					
Jesse Keefe	Super combined, standing	LW4	DNF					
Tyler McKenzie	Super combined, standing	LW6 / 8-1	DNF					
Spencer Wood	Super combined, standing	LW9-2	1:18.90	10	46.70	7	2:05.60	8
Jasmin Bambur	Giant slalom, sitting	LW11	DNF					
Matthew Brewer	Giant slalom, sitting	LW12-2	1:13.03	14	1:14.75	11	2:27.78	12
Ravi Drugan	Giant slalom, sitting	LW12-2	1:11.49	11	1:19.34	18	2:30.83	15
Robert Enigl	Giant slalom, sitting	LW12-1	DNF					
Andrew Kurka	Giant slalom, sitting	LW12-1	DNF					
Patrick Halgren	Giant slalom, standing	LW2	DNF					
Jesse Keefe	Giant slalom, standing	LW4	1:09.96	13	1:09.74	13	2:19.70	13
Tyler McKenzie	Giant slalom, standing	LW6 / 8-1	1:12.94	19	1:14.81	21	2:27.75	19
Michael O'Hearn	Giant slalom, standing	LW9-1	1:29.88	30	1:28.90	28	2:58.78	28
Spencer Wood	Giant slalom, standing	LW9-2	DNF					
Jasmin Bambur	Slalom, sitting	LW11	1:22.61	22	52.24	16	2:14.85	18
Matthew Brewer	Slalom, sitting	LW12-2	DNF					
Ravi Drugan	Slalom, sitting	LW12-2	59.07	18	50.86	14	1:49.93	15
Robert Enigl	Slalom, sitting	LW12-1	DNF					
Kyle Taulman	Slalom, sitting	LW11	DNF					
Noah Bury	Slalom, standing	LW4	DNF					
Patrick Halgren	Slalom, standing	LW2	51.89	15	48.92	17	1:40.81	15
Jesse Keefe	Slalom, standing	LW4	51.40	13	46.73	12	1:38.13	13
Tyler McKenzie	Slalom, standing	LW6 / 8-1	57.70	21	DNF			
Spencer Wood	Slalom, standing	LW9-2	DNF					

Women

Athlete	Event	Classification	Run 1		Run 2		Total	
Athlete	Event	Classification	Time	Rank	Time	Rank	Time	Rank
Saylor O'Brien	Downhill, sitting	LW12-1	—N/a				1:36.26	5
Anna Soens	Downhill, sitting	LW12-1	—N/a				DNF	
Audrey Crowley	Downhill, standing	LW6 / 8-2	—N/a				1:27.49	6
Allie Johnson	Downhill, standing	LW6 / 8-1	—N/a				1:35.34	10
Kelsey O'Driscoll	Downhill, standing	LW1	—N/a				DNF	
Meg Gustafson; Guide: Spenser Gustafson	Downhill, visually impaired	AS4	—N/a				1:32.69	6
Saylor O'Brien	Super-G, sitting	LW12-1	—N/a				1:31.50	5
Anna Soens	Super-G, sitting	LW12-1	—N/a				1:27.37	4
Audrey Crowley	Super-G, standing	LW6 / 8-2	—N/a				1:22.93	8
Allie Johnson	Super-G, standing	LW6 / 8-1	—N/a				1:30.46	13
Kelsey O'Driscoll	Super-G, standing	LW1	—N/a				1:20.52	7
Meg Gustafson; Guide: Spenser Gustafson	Super-G, visually impaired	AS4	—N/a				1:26.01	8
Saylor O'Brien	Super combined, sitting	LW12-1	1:33.28	7	DNF			
Anna Soens	Super combined, sitting	LW12-1	1:29.48	5	DNF			
Audrey Crowley	Super combined, standing	LW6 / 8-2	1:22.32	6	49.98	8	2:12.30	5
Allie Johnson	Super combined, standing	LW6 / 8-1	1:29.54	13	57.30	12	2:26.84	13
Kelsey O'Driscoll	Super combined, standing	LW1	1:19.56	3	53.84	11	2:13.40	8
Meg Gustafson; Guide: Spenser Gustafson	Super combined, visually impaired	AS4	1:26.19	7	51.30	8	2:17.49	7
Hailey Griffin	Giant slalom, sitting	LW12-1	1:26.91	10	1:31.86	9	2:58.77	7
Saylor O'Brien	Giant slalom, sitting	LW12-1	1:25.34	8	DNF			
Anna Soens	Giant slalom, sitting	LW12-1	1:21.75	6	DNF			
Laurie Stephens	Giant slalom, sitting	LW12-1	1:27.03	11	DNF			
Audrey Crowley	Giant slalom, standing	LW6 / 8-2	DSQ					
Allie Johnson	Giant slalom, standing	LW6 / 8-1	1:20.37	13	1:25.86	13	2:46.23	12
Kelsey O'Driscoll	Giant slalom, standing	LW1	1:18.42	11	1:21.09	9	2:39.44	9
Meg Gustafson; Guide: Spenser Gustafson	Giant slalom, visually impaired	AS4	1:14.53	4	1:18.36	5	2:32.89	5
Hailey Griffin	Slalom, sitting	LW12-1	59.86	13	1:01.49	14	2:01.35	14
Saylor O'Brien	Slalom, sitting	LW12-1	DNF					
Anna Soens	Slalom, sitting	LW12-1	52.48	8	59.00	12	1:51.48	8
Laurie Stephens	Slalom, sitting	LW12-1	58.35	11	1:01.27	13	1:59.62	12
Audrey Crowley	Slalom, standing	LW6 / 8-2	DSQ					
Allie Johnson	Slalom, standing	LW6 / 8-1	53.09	14	54.41	14	1:47.50	13
Kelsey O'Driscoll	Slalom, standing	LW1	48.60	12	47.24	8	1:35.84	9
Meg Gustafson; Guide: Spenser Gustafson	Slalom, visually impaired	AS4	47.70	6	48.68	8	1:36.38	6

== Para biathlon ==
Men

Athlete	Event	Classification	Factor	Qualification				Final			
Athlete	Event	Classification	Factor	Time	Misses	Factored time	Rank	Time	Misses	Factored time	Rank
Michael Kneeland	Sprint, sitting	LW11.5	96%	—N/a				24:31.1	0+0	23:32.3	19
Aaron Pike	Sprint, sitting	LW11	93%	—N/a				22:05.2	0+0	20:32.4	6
Joshua Sweeney	Sprint, sitting	LW12	100%	—N/a				20:28.1	0+0	—N/a	5
Aaron Pike	Individual, sitting	LW11	93%	—N/a				38:40.1	1+0+0+0	37:07.3	4
Joshua Sweeney	Individual, sitting	LW12	100%	—N/a				37:13.7	0+1+0+0	—N/a	5
Michael Kneeland	Sprint pursuit, sitting	LW11.5	96%	DNF				Did not advance			
Aaron Pike	Sprint pursuit, sitting	LW11	93%	9:42.0	1+0	9:01.3	7 Q	11:05.4	0+0	10:18.8	5
Joshua Sweeney	Sprint pursuit, sitting	LW12	100%	9:00.2	0+0	—N/a	5 Q	10:42.5	1+0	—N/a	6

Women

Athlete	Event	Classification	Factor	Qualification				Final			
Athlete	Event	Classification	Factor	Time	Misses	Factored time	Rank	Time	Misses	Factored time	Rank
Kendall Gretsch	Sprint, sitting	LW11.5	96%	—N/a				22:31.4	0+0	21:37.3	2nd place, silver medalist(s)
Oksana Masters	Sprint, sitting	LW12	100%	—N/a				21:21.3	0+0	—N/a	1st place, gold medalist(s)
Nicole Zaino	Sprint, sitting	LW11.5	96%	—N/a				26:31.7	1+1	25:28.0	11
Danielle Aravich	Sprint, standing	LW8	96%	—N/a				22:10.9	1+1	21:17.7	10
Sydney Peterson	Sprint, standing	LW9	89%	—N/a				21:43.1	1+2	19:19.8	4
Kendall Gretsch	Individual, sitting	LW11.6	96%	—N/a				40:12.6	0+0+0+1	38:36.1	3rd place, bronze medalist(s)
Erin Martin	Individual, sitting	LW10	86%	—N/a				56:05.6	1+0+1+0	49:55.4	10
Oksana Masters	Individual, sitting	LW12	100%	—N/a				38:47.9	0+1+0+0	—N/a	4
Danielle Aravich	Individual, standing	LW8	96%	—N/a				36:14.5	0+0+0+1	34:47.5	6
Kendall Gretsch	Sprint pursuit, sitting	LW11.5	96%	9:52.8	0+0	9:29.1	1 Q	12:02.0	0+0	11:33.1	1st place, gold medalist(s)
Erin Martin	Sprint pursuit, sitting	LW10	86%	13:29.4	0+1	11:36.1	11 Q	20:29.7	1+1	17:37.5	11
Oksana Masters	Sprint pursuit, sitting	LW12	100%	10:53.8	3+1	—N/a	7 Q	13:51.1	1+2	—N/a	6
Danielle Aravich	Sprint pursuit, standing	LW8	96%	12:43.1	1+2	12:12.6	10 Q	DNS			
Sydney Peterson	Sprint pursuit, standing	LW9	89%	12:21.1	0+0	10:59.6	4 Q	14:33.8	1+1	12:57.7	4

== Para cross-country skiing ==
Distance
Men

Athlete	Event	Classification	Factor	Time	Factored time	Rank
Daniel Cnossen	10 km, sitting	LW12	100%	26:04.3	—N/a	11
Michael Kneeland	10 km, sitting	LW11.5	96%	30:48.1	29:34.2	25
Jack Berry	10 km classical, standing	LW4	97%	32:46.0	31:47.0	12
Jake Adicoff; Guide: Reid Goble	10 km classical, visually impaired	NS3	100%	28:03.6	—N/a	1st place, gold medalist(s)
Max Nelson; Guide: Gus Schatzlein	10 km classical, visually impaired	NS3	100%	37:09.2	—N/a	13
Daniel Cnossen	20 km, sitting	LW12	100%	58:30.5	—N/a	17
Aaron Pike	20 km, sitting	LW11	93%	DNS		
Joshua Sweeney	20 km, sitting	LW12	100%	56:00.8	—N/a	13
Jake Adicoff; Guide: Reid Goble	20 km freestyle, visually impaired	NS3	100%	42:17.4	—N/a	1st place, gold medalist(s)
Max Nelson; Guide: Gus Schatzlein	20 km freestyle, visually impaired	NS3	100%	DNS		

Women

Athlete	Event	Classification	Factor	Time	Factored time	Rank
Kendall Gretsch	10 km, sitting	LW11.5	96%	28:36.3	27:27.6	3rd place, bronze medalist(s)
Oksana Masters	10 km, sitting	LW12	100%	26:31.6	—N/a	1st place, gold medalist(s)
Erin Martin	10 km, sitting	LW10	86%	38:29.3	33:06.0	15
Nicole Zaino	10 km, sitting	LW11.5	96%	32:00.8	30:44.0	13
Sydney Peterson	10 km classical, standing	LW9	88%	33:53.2	29:49.2	1st place, gold medalist(s)
Kendall Gretsch	20 km, sitting	LW11.5	96%	1:03:58.4	1:01:24.9	4
Oksana Masters	20 km, sitting	LW12	100%	59:34.5	—N/a	3rd place, bronze medalist(s)
Nicole Zaino	20 km, sitting	LW11.5	96%	1:14:49.5	1:11:49.9	12
Danielle Aravich	20 km freestyle, standing	LW8	92%	53:37.2	51:28.5	7
Sydney Peterson	20 km freestyle, standing	LW9	88%	53:17.5	47:25.8	1st place, gold medalist(s)

Mixed / Open

Athlete	Event	Total factor	Time	Factored time	Rank
Jake Adicoff; Guide: Reid Goble; Oksana Masters; Sydney Peterson; Joshua Sweeney	Mixed 4 × 2.5 km relay	335%	26:25.1	23:24.2	1st place, gold medalist(s)
Jack Berry; Michael Kneeland; Erin Martin; Max Nelson; Guide: Gus Schatzlein	Open 4 × 2.5 km relay	339%	54:13.2	30:20.6	11

Sprint
Men

Athlete	Event	Classification	Factor	Qualification			Semifinal			Final		
Athlete	Event	Classification	Factor	Time	Factored time	Rank	Time	Factored time	Rank	Time	Factored time	Rank
Daniel Cnossen	Sprint, sitting	LW12	100%	2:20.05	—N/a	15	Did not advance					
Michael Kneeland	Sprint, sitting	LW11.5	96%	2:44.10	2:37.54	32	Did not advance					
Aaron Pike	Sprint, sitting	LW11	93%	2:24.15	2:14.06	5 Q	2:42.8	2:31.4	5	Did not advance		9
Joshua Sweeney	Sprint, sitting	LW12	100%	2:19.61	—N/a	14	Did not advance					
Jack Berry	Sprint, standing	LW4	97%	2:41.87	2:37.01	11 Q	3:16.2	3:10.3	5	Did not advance		10
Jake Adicoff; Guide: Peter Wolter	Sprint, visually impaired	NS3	100%	2:27.58	—N/a	3 Q	2:50.8	—N/a	1 Q	2:44.7	—N/a	1st place, gold medalist(s)
Max Nelson; Guide: Gus Schatzlein	Sprint, visually impaired	NS3	100%	3:11.23	—N/a	14	Did not advance					

Women

Athlete	Event	Classification	Factor	Qualification			Semifinal			Final		
Athlete	Event	Classification	Factor	Time	Factored time	Rank	Time	Factored time	Rank	Time	Factored time	Rank
Oksana Masters	Sprint, sitting	LW12	100%	2:29.32	—N/a	1 Q	3:06.8	—N/a	1 Q	3:07.1	—N/a	1st place, gold medalist(s)
Erin Martin	Sprint, sitting	LW10	86%	3:24.22	2:55.63	14	Did not advance					
Nicole Zaino	Sprint, sitting	LW11.5	96%	2:56.29	2:49.24	10 Q	3:29.3	3:20.9	4	Did not advance		8
Danielle Aravich	Sprint, standing	LW8	92%	3:21.48	3:05.36	6 Q	4:09.3	3:44.2	3 Q	4:18.3	3:57.6	6
Sydney Peterson	Sprint, standing	LW9	88%	3:18.91	2:55.04	4 Q	4:07.0	3:37.4	2 Q	4:04.9	3:35.5	2nd place, silver medalist(s)

== Para ice hockey ==
Roster
Kayden Beasley, Brett Bolton, Liam Cunningham, Travis Dodson, David Eustace, Declan Farmer, Noah Grove, Malik Jones, Griffin LaMarre, Jen Lee, Kevin McKee, Josh Misiewicz, Evan Nichols, Josh Pauls, Brody Roybal, Landon Uthke, Jack Wallace

Summary

Team	Event	Preliminary round				Semifinal / Cl.	Final / BM / Pl.	
Team	Event	Opposition Result	Opposition Result	Opposition Result	Rank	Opposition Result	Opposition Result	Rank
United States	Mixed tournament	Italy; W 14–1	Germany; W 13–0	China; W 7–1	1 Q	Czechia; W 6–1	Canada; W 6–2	1st place, gold medalist(s)

Preliminary round

Pos	Team	Pld	W	OTW	OTL	L	GF	GA	GD	Pts	Qualification
1	United States	3	3	0	0	0	34	2	+32	9	Semifinals
2	China	3	2	0	0	1	24	8	+16	6	Semifinals
3	Italy (H)	3	1	0	0	2	4	26	−22	3	5–8th place semifinals
4	Germany	3	0	0	0	3	1	27	−26	0	5–8th place semifinals

Source: Milano Cortina 2026
(H) Host

7 March 2026; 17:05	United States	14–1 (3–1, 7–0, 4–0)	Italy	PalaItalia, Milan; Attendance: 8,992

Game reference

Jen Lee
Goalies
Julian Kasslatter
Santino Stillitano
Referee:
(Canada) Patrick Myers
Linesmen:
(Norway) Marius Hermansen Oswold
(Sweden) Andreas Lunden

	0–1	00:25 – Depaoli (Rosa)
Eustace (Dodson) – 03:46	1–1
Bolton (Farmer, Pauls) – 09:00	2–1
Farmer (Grove, Beasley) – 11:18	3–1
Bolton (Pauls, Grove) – 16:39	4–1
McKee (Roybal, Wallace) – 17:54	5–1
Farmer (Pauls) – 18:29	6–1
Beasley (Farmer) – 18:57	7–1
Grove (Nichols, Roybal) – 20:18	8–1
Farmer (Eustace) – 22:25	9–1
Farmer (Pauls) – 23:16	10–1
Jones (Grove, Roybal) – 33:40	11–1
Nichols (Roybal, Grove) – 34:12	12–1
Wallace (Dodson, Cunningham) – 35:44	13–1
Eustace (Grove, Dodson) – 42:46	14–1

2 min
Penalties
4 min
53
Shots
2

9 March 2026; 17:05	Germany	0–13 (0–6, 0–5, 0–2)	United States	PalaItalia, Milan; Attendance: 1,284

Game reference

Veit Mühlhans
Goalies
Griffin LaMarre
Referee:
(Canada) Matthew Fergenbaum
Linesmen:
(Sweden) Tony Rundström
(Italy) Alexander Wiest

0–1	00:58 – Farmer (Roybal)
0–2	02:52 – Farmer (Jones, Grove)
0–3	06:31 – Farmer (Pauls, Grove)
0–4	07:02 – Eustace (Dodson, Wallace)
0–5	09:44 – Eustace (Wallace, Utkhe) (PP)
0–6	14:32 – Beasley (Jones, Nichols)
0–7	18:10 – Bolton (Farmer, Wallace)
0–8	18:29 – Wallace (Farmer, Utkhe)
0–9	19:21 – Eustace
0–10	21:20 – Farmer (Roybal, Bolton)
0–11	21:42 – Bolton (Farmer, Wallace)
0–12	32:44 – Beasley (Nichols)
0–13	38:10 – Wallace

2 min
Penalties
2 min
1
Shots
41

10 March 2026; 13:35	United States	7–1 (2–0, 4–0, 1–1)	China	PalaItalia, Milan; Attendance: 2,660

Game reference

Jen Lee
Goalies
Ji Yanzhao
Wang Wei
Referee:
(Canada) Kevin Webinger
Linesmen:
(Canada) Dylan Dauphinee
(United States) Brendan Lewis

Pauls (Roybal, Wallace) (PP) – 11:46	1–0
Farmer (Roybal) (PP) – 14:38	2–0
Roybal (Nichols) (PP) – 17:22	3–0
Farmer (Wallace) – 20:24	4–0
Roybal (Farmer, Nichols) (PP) – 26:16	5–0
Cunningham (Grove, Farmer) (PP) – 28:38	6–0
Farmer – 30:59	7–0
	7–1	34:28 – Zhu (Tian, Wang Z.)

6 min
Penalties
18 min
31
Shots
9

Semifinal

13 March 2026; 14:35	United States	6–1 (1–1, 2–0, 3–0)	Czechia	PalaItalia, Milan; Attendance: 3,016

Game reference

Griffin LaMarre
Goalies
Patrik Sedláček
Referee:
(Canada) Matthew Fergenbaum
Linesmen:
(Canada) Dylan Dauphinee
(Sweden) Andreas Lunden

	0–1	05:08 – Geier (Kubeš, Kapko) (PP)
Farmer (Dodson, Eustace) – 10:26	1–1
Eustace (Farmer) – 19:59	2–1
Farmer (Eustace, Dodson) – 20:18	3–1
Pauls (Farmer, Grove) – 35:19	4–1
Farmer (Roybal, Pauls) – 37:52	5–1
Grove (Roybal, Farmer) (PP) – 38:49	6–1

4 min
Penalties
8 min
41
Shots
5

Gold medal game

15 March 2026; 16:05	United States	6–2 (1–0, 2–1, 3–1)	Canada	PalaItalia, Milan; Attendance: 11,500

Game reference

Griffin LaMarre
Goalies
Corbin Watson
Referee:
(Canada) Kevin Webinger
Linesmen:
(Canada) Dylan Dauphinee
(Sweden) Tony Rundström

Wallace (PP) – 08:39	1–0
	1–1	16:45 – Hickey (McGregor, Cozzolino) (PP)
Beasley – 21:29	2–1
Wallace (Farmer) – 24:52	3–1
Wallace (Pauls) – 31:42	4–1
	4–2	32:06 – Hickey
Farmer (Wallace) (SH) – 41:20	5–2
Roybal (SH, EN) – 41:29	6–2

6 min
Penalties
8 min
26
Shots
15

== Para snowboard ==
Banked slalom
Men

Athlete	Event	Run 1	Run 2	Rank
Noah Elliott	Banked slalom, SB-LL1	~~58.96~~	58.94	1st place, gold medalist(s)
Mike Schultz	Banked slalom, SB-LL1	~~1:00.59~~	1:00.05	3rd place, bronze medalist(s)
Keith Gabel	Banked slalom, SB-LL2	~~58.92~~	58.79	8
Zach Miler	Banked slalom, SB-LL2	~~58.11~~	57.86	5
Joe Pleban	Banked slalom, SB-LL2	~~1:00.63~~	59.85	11

Women

Athlete	Event	Classification	Run 1	Run 2	Rank
Kate Delson	Banked slalom, SB-LL2	SB-LL2	~~1:03.75~~	1:02.99	1st place, gold medalist(s)
Jaclyn Hamwey	Banked slalom, SB-LL2	SB-LL2	~~1:12.64~~	1:11.73	9
Brenna Huckaby	Banked slalom, SB-LL2	SB-LL1	~~1:04.02~~	1:03.98	3rd place, bronze medalist(s)

Snowboard cross
Men

Athlete	Event	Seeding		Quarterfinal	Semifinal	Final	
Athlete	Event	Time	Rank	Position	Position	Position	Rank
Noah Elliott	Snowboard cross, SB-LL1	53.64	5	2 Q	2 FA	2	2nd place, silver medalist(s)
Mike Schultz	Snowboard cross, SB-LL1	53.63	4	1 Q	3 FB	2	6
Keith Gabel	Snowboard cross, SB-LL2	51.64	4	1 Q	3 FB	1	5
Zach Miller	Snowboard cross, SB-LL2	53.38	13	2 Q	4 FB	2	6
Joe Pleban	Snowboard cross, SB-LL2	51.82	7	2 Q	4 FB	4	8

Women

Athlete	Event	Classification	Seeding		Pre-heat	Semifinal	Final	
Athlete	Event	Classification	Time	Rank	Position	Position	Position	Rank
Kate Delson	Snowboard cross, SB-LL2	SB-LL2	57.95	3	Bye	2 FA	2	2nd place, silver medalist(s)
Jaclyn Hamwey	Snowboard cross, SB-LL2	SB-LL2	1:01.00	6	2 Q	3 FB	3	7
Brenna Huckaby	Snowboard cross, SB-LL2	SB-LL1	58.53	1	Bye	3 FB	2	6

Qualification legend: Q - Qualify to next round; FA - Qualify to medal final; FB - Qualify to consolation final

== Wheelchair curling ==
Summary

Team	Event	Group stage										Semifinal	Final / BM	
Team	Event	Opposition Score	Opposition Score	Opposition Score	Opposition Score	Opposition Score	Opposition Score	Opposition Score	Opposition Score	Opposition Score	Rank	Opposition Score	Opposition Score	Rank
Matthew Thums; Sean O'Neill; Daniel Rose; Batoyun Uranchimeg; Kathleen Verderber	Mixed team	CHN; L 7–12	GBR; L 5–6	ITA; W 10–1	SWE; W 7–1	LAT; L 6–8	SVK; L 3–8	KOR; W 9–2	NOR; L 4–7	CAN; L 3–7	9	Did not advance		
Laura Dwyer; Stephen Emt	Mixed doubles	LAT; W 11–6	JPN; L 5–7	EST; W 8–4	GBR; L 4–5	KOR; L 1–10	ITA; W 7–5	CHN; W 7–6	—N/a		2 Q	KOR; L 3–6	LAT; L 10–11	4

=== Mixed tournament ===
Final Round Robin Standings
Team	Skip	Pld	W	L	W–L	PF	PA	EW	EL	BE	SE	S%	DSC	Qualification
Canada	Mark Ideson	9	9	0	–	71	36	36	26	2	19	68.2%	84.488	Playoffs
China	Wang Haitao	9	8	1	–	76	42	38	26	1	15	68.3%	83.350	Playoffs
Sweden	Viljo Petersson-Dahl	9	5	4	1–0	47	48	31	31	6	13	62.8%	98.125	Playoffs
South Korea	Yang Hui-tae	9	5	4	0–1	55	48	36	32	1	17	64.6%	90.525	Playoffs
Norway	Jostein Stordahl	9	4	5	1–0	41	55	28	31	2	12	58.3%	130.863	
Italy	Egidio Marchese	9	4	5	0–1	52	53	32	27	0	15	60.6%	107.831	
Latvia	Ojārs Briedis	9	3	6	2–0	45	67	27	33	0	12	50.2%	113.381	
Slovakia	Radoslav Ďuriš	9	3	6	1–1	42	56	26	37	1	13	51.9%	117.688	
United States	Sean O'Neill	9	3	6	0–2	54	52	34	32	0	14	58.3%	72.156	
Great Britain	Hugh Nibloe	9	1	8	–	40	66	26	39	0	7	55.7%	129.675	

Source: Official website

Round robin
The United States had a bye in draws 3, 7 and 10.

Draw 1
Saturday, March 7, 9:35

Sheet C	1	2	3	4	5	6	7	8	Final
United States (O'Neill) 🔨	2	0	3	0	0	2	0	0	7
China (Wang)	0	4	0	4	1	0	1	2	12

Draw 2
Saturday, March 7, 18:35

Sheet B	1	2	3	4	5	6	7	8	EE	Final
United States (O'Neill) 🔨	1	0	2	0	0	1	0	1	0	5
Great Britain (Nibloe)	0	2	0	1	1	0	1	0	1	6

Draw 4
Sunday, March 8, 18:35

Sheet A	1	2	3	4	5	6	7	8	Final
United States (O'Neill) 🔨	3	0	4	1	1	1	X	X	10
Italy (Marchese)	0	1	0	0	0	0	X	X	1

Draw 5
Monday, March 9, 9:35

Sheet B	1	2	3	4	5	6	7	8	Final
Sweden (Petersson-Dahl)	0	0	0	0	1	0	0	X	1
United States (O'Neill) 🔨	2	1	1	1	0	1	1	X	7

Draw 6
Monday, March 9, 18:35

Sheet D	1	2	3	4	5	6	7	8	Final
United States (O'Neill) 🔨	0	0	0	0	1	2	3	X	6
Latvia (Briedis)	2	2	1	3	0	0	0	X	8

Draw 8
Tuesday, March 10, 18:35

Sheet A	1	2	3	4	5	6	7	8	Final
Slovakia (Ďuriš) 🔨	2	1	1	0	3	0	1	X	8
United States (O'Neill)	0	0	0	2	0	1	0	X	3

Draw 9
Wednesday, March 11, 9:05

Sheet B	1	2	3	4	5	6	7	8	Final
United States (O'Neill) 🔨	0	3	1	3	0	1	1	X	9
South Korea (Yang)	1	0	0	0	1	0	0	X	2

Draw 11
Thursday, March 12, 13:35

Sheet C	1	2	3	4	5	6	7	8	Final
Norway (Stordahl)	1	2	0	1	0	0	0	3	7
United States (O'Neill) 🔨	0	0	1	0	1	1	1	0	4

Draw 12
Thursday, March 12, 18:35

Sheet D	1	2	3	4	5	6	7	8	Final
Canada (Ideson)	0	2	1	0	1	2	1	X	7
United States (O'Neill) 🔨	2	0	0	1	0	0	0	X	3

=== Mixed doubles ===
Final Round Robin Standings
Team	Athletes	Pld	W	L	W–L	PF	PA	EW	EL	BE	SE	S%	DSC	Qualification
China	Wang Meng / Yang Jinqiao	7	6	1	–	66	32	32	21	0	14	64.9%	106.033	Playoffs
United States	Laura Dwyer / Stephen Emt	7	4	3	1–1	43	43	25	27	0	9	53.4%	89.717	Playoffs
South Korea	Baek Hye-jin / Lee Yong-suk	7	4	3	1–1	58	26	30	19	0	17	59.9%	142.058	Playoffs
Latvia	Poļina Rožkova / Agris Lasmans	7	4	3	1–1	46	45	28	25	0	12	48.5%	150.675	Playoffs
Great Britain	Jo Butterfield / Jason Kean	7	3	4	1–0	47	56	25	29	0	8	51.5%	95.075	
Japan	Aki Ogawa / Yoji Nakajima	7	3	4	0–1	30	53	19	30	0	8	49.0%	88.067	
Estonia	Katlin Riidebach / Ain Villau	7	2	5	1–0	31	58	22	28	0	9	47.6%	98.233	
Italy	Orietta Bertò / Paolo Ioriatti	7	2	5	0–1	43	51	28	30	0	11	55.6%	73.700	

Source: Official website

Round robin

Draw 1
Wednesday, March 4, 19:05

Sheet D	1	2	3	4	5	6	7	8	Final
Latvia (Rožkova / Lasmans)	0	0	4	0	1	1	0	0	6
United States (Dwyer / Emt) 🔨	1	2	0	3	0	0	1	4	11

Draw 2
Thursday, March 5, 10:05

Sheet C	1	2	3	4	5	6	7	8	Final
Japan (Ogawa / Nakajima) 🔨	1	0	2	1	2	0	1	X	7
United States (Dwyer / Emt)	0	1	0	0	0	4	0	X	5

Draw 3
Thursday, March 5, 19:05

Sheet A	1	2	3	4	5	6	7	8	Final
United States (Dwyer / Emt)	0	3	2	2	0	1	0	X	8
Estonia (Riidebach / Villau) 🔨	2	0	0	0	1	0	1	X	4

Draw 4
Friday, March 6, 9:05

Sheet B	1	2	3	4	5	6	7	8	Final
Great Britain (Butterfield / Kean)	1	0	0	1	0	2	0	1	5
United States (Dwyer / Emt) 🔨	0	1	1	0	1	0	1	0	4

Draw 5
Saturday, March 7, 14:35

Sheet A	1	2	3	4	5	6	7	8	Final
South Korea (Baek / Lee)	3	1	0	3	1	2	X	X	10
United States (Dwyer / Emt) 🔨	0	0	1	0	0	0	X	X	1

Draw 6
Sunday, March 8, 14:35

Sheet D	1	2	3	4	5	6	7	8	Final
United States (Dwyer / Emt)	0	4	0	1	0	0	1	1	7
Italy (Bertò / Ioriatti) 🔨	1	0	1	0	2	1	0	0	5

Draw 7
Monday, March 9, 14:35

Sheet C	1	2	3	4	5	6	7	8	Final
United States (Dwyer / Emt) 🔨	1	2	1	0	0	0	2	1	7
China (Wang / Yang)	0	0	0	4	1	1	0	0	6

Semifinal
Tuesday, March 10, 14:35

Sheet D	1	2	3	4	5	6	7	8	Final
United States (Dwyer / Emt) 🔨	0	1	0	1	0	0	1	X	3
South Korea (Baek / Lee)	2	0	2	0	1	1	0	X	6

Bronze medal match
Wednesday, March 11, 14:35

Sheet B	1	2	3	4	5	6	7	8	EE	Final
United States (Dwyer / Emt) 🔨	4	0	0	1	0	4	0	1	0	10
Latvia (Rožkova / Lasmans)	0	5	1	0	1	0	3	0	1	11
