= Para alpine skiing at the 2026 Winter Paralympics – Women's slalom =

Women's slalom at the XIV Paralympic Winter Games
- Paralympic alpine skiing
- Venue: Tofane Alpine Skiing Centre
- Dates: 14 March

Women's slalom (visually impaired) at the XIV Paralympic Winter Games
- Competitors: 16 from 12 nations

Medalists
1st place, gold medalist(s)		Veronika Aigner; Guide: Eric Digruber	Austria
2nd place, silver medalist(s)		Elina Stary; Guide: Stefan Winter	Austria
3rd place, bronze medalist(s)		Alexandra Rexová; Guide: Matúš Ďuriš	Slovakia

Women's slalom (standing) at the XIV Paralympic Winter Games
- Competitors: 20 from 15 nations

Medalists
1st place, gold medalist(s)		Varvara Voronchikhina	Russia
2nd place, silver medalist(s)		Zhu Wenjing	China
3rd place, bronze medalist(s)		Michaela Gosselin	Canada

Women's slalom (sitting) at the XIV Paralympic Winter Games
- Competitors: 16 from 10 nations

Medalists
1st place, gold medalist(s)		Zhang Wenjing	China
2nd place, silver medalist(s)		Nette Kiviranta	Finland
3rd place, bronze medalist(s)		Audrey Pascual	Spain

The Women's slalom competition of the 2026 Winter Paralympics was held on 14 March 2026 at the Tofane Alpine Skiing Centre.

== Medal table ==
* Host nation (Italy)

Rank	Nation	Gold	Silver	Bronze	Total
1	Austria (AUT)	1	1	0	2
1	China (CHN)	1	1	0	2
3	Russia (RUS)	1	0	0	1
4	Finland (FIN)	0	1	0	1
5	Canada (CAN)	0	0	1	1
5	Slovakia (SVK)	0	0	1	1
5	Spain (ESP)	0	0	1	1
Totals (7 entries)		3	3	3	9

== Visually impaired ==
In the slalom visually impaired, the athlete with a visual impairement has a sighted guide. The two skiers are considered a team, and dual medals are awarded.

Rank	Bib	Name	Country	Run 1	Rank	Run 2	Rank	Total	Difference
1st place, gold medalist(s)	3	Veronika Aigner; Guide: Eric Digruber	Austria	40.72	1	42.01	1	1:22.73	
2nd place, silver medalist(s)	2	Elina Stary; Guide: Stefan Winter	Austria	42.36	2	44.41	2	1:26.77	+4.04
3rd place, bronze medalist(s)	7	Alexandra Rexová; Guide: Matúš Ďuriš	Slovakia	45.98	4	45.99	3	1:31.97	+9.24
4	4	Martina Vozza; Guide: Ylenia Sabidussi	Italy	44.94	3	47.11	4	1:32.05	+9.32
5	5	Menna Fitzpatrick; Guide: Katie Guest	Great Britain	47.37	5	48.30	6	1:35.67	+12.94
6	9	Meg Gustafson; Guide: Spencer Gustafson	United States	47.70	6	48.68	8	1:36.38	+13.65
7	10	Sara Choi; Guide: Eo Eun-mi	South Korea	48.65	7	47.92	5	1:36.57	+13.84
8	8	Eva Nikou; Guide: Dimitris Profentzas	Greece	49.32	8	48.48	7	1:37.80	+15.07
9	12	Oliwia Gołaś; Guide: Andrzej Stasik	Poland	49.60	9	49.23	9	1:38.83	+16.10
10	13	Maya Fügenschuh; Guide: Johanna Holzmann	Germany	51.15	10	51.97	10	1:43.12	+20.39
11	6	Georgia Gunew; Guide: Ethan Jackson	Australia	52.21	11	52.20	11	1:44.41	+21.68
12	14	Alejandra Requesens; Guide: Victoria Ibáñez	Spain	58.55	12	57.92	12	1:56.47	+33.74
13	16	Karla Kordić; Guide: Iva Hršak	Croatia	1:03.96	13	1:02.61	13	2:06.57	+43.84
	1	Chiara Mazzel; Guide: Fabrizio Casal	Italy	DNF		—			
	15	Viktória Balážová; Guide: Alica Jakubeková	Slovakia	DNF		—			
	11	Hester Poole; Guide: Ali Hall	Great Britain	DSQ		—			

== Standing ==
Rank	Bib	Name	Country	Run 1	Rank	Run 2	Rank	Total	Difference
1st place, gold medalist(s)	17	Varvara Voronchikhina	Russia	42.65	2	44.30	1	1:26.95	
2nd place, silver medalist(s)	29	Zhu Wenjing	China	44.06	4	44.38	2	1:28.44	+1.49
3rd place, bronze medalist(s)	18	Michaela Gosselin	Canada	44.05	3	45.14	5	1:29.19	+2.24
4	19	Zhang Mengqiu	China	44.75	6	44.66	3	1:29.41	+2.46
5	21	Aurélie Richard	France	44.30	5	45.17	6	1:29.47	+2.52
6	22	Anna-Maria Rieder	Germany	45.45	7	44.87	4	1:30.32	+3.37
7	24	Andrea Rothfuss	Germany	45.87	9	46.37	7	1:32.24	+5.29
8	32	María Martín-Granizo	Spain	45.66	8	47.82	9	1:33.48	+6.53
9	25	Kelsey O'Driscoll	United States	48.60	12	47.24	8	1:35.84	+8.89
10	28	Ammi Hondo	Japan	49.14	13	48.33	10	1:37.47	+10.52
11	26	Florence Carrier	Canada	47.91	10	50.49	11	1:38.40	+11.45
12	30	Lucija Smetiško	Croatia	48.11	11	52.09	12	1:40.20	+13.25
13	33	Allie Johnson	United States	53.09	14	54.41	14	1:47.50	+20.55
14	34	Liana France	Australia	54.22	15	53.57	13	1:47.79	+20.84
15	35	Laura Streng	Austria	55.84	16	55.92	15	1:51.76	+24.81
16	36	Stela Yanchovichina	Bulgaria	1:03.06	17	1:05.36	16	2:08.42	+41.47
17	37	Ilma Kazazić	Bosnia and Herzegovina	1:08.30	18	1:09.59	17	2:17.89	+50.94
	20	Ebba Årsjö	Sweden	40.89	1	DNF		—	
	27	Claire Petit	Netherlands	DNF		—			
	23	Audrey Crowley	United States	DSQ		—			
	31	Guo Jiaxin	China	DNS		—			

== Sitting ==
Rank	Bib	Name	Country	Run 1	Rank	Run 2	Rank	Total	Difference
1st place, gold medalist(s)	42	Zhang Wenjing	China	43.03	2	44.66	2	1:27.69	
2nd place, silver medalist(s)	38	Nette Kiviranta	Finland	43.18	3	44.78	3	1:27.96	+0.27
3rd place, bronze medalist(s)	41	Audrey Pascual	Spain	43.02	1	45.02	4	1:28.04	+0.35
4	39	Anna-Lena Forster	Germany	44.60	4	43.52	1	1:28.12	+0.43
5	43	Liu Sitong	China	44.82	5	45.04	5	1:29.86	+2.17
6	45	Marte Goossen	Belgium	47.25	6	49.76	7	1:37.01	+9.32
7	40	Momoka Muraoka	Japan	49.38	7	48.21	6	1:37.59	+9.90
8	47	Anna Soens	United States	52.48	8	59.00	12	1:51.48	+23.79
9	52	Iraide Rodríguez	Spain	56.58	9	57.87	9	1:54.45	+26.76
10	51	Christina Obwexer	Austria	57.16	10	58.01	10	1:55.17	+27.48
11	50	Maiju Laurila	Finland	58.74	12	56.74	8	1:55.48	+27.79
12	44	Laurie Stephens	United States	58.35	11	1:01.27	13	1:59.62	+31.93
13	48	Sarah Hundert	Liechtenstein	1:01.01	14	58.88	11	1:59.89	+32.20
14	49	Hailey Griffin	United States	59.86	13	1:01.49	14	2:01.35	+33.66
	46	Saylor O'Brien	United States	DNF		—			
	53	Park Chae-yi	South Korea	DNF		—			

== See also ==
- Alpine skiing at the 2026 Winter Olympics
