= Para alpine skiing at the 2026 Winter Paralympics – Women's super-G =

Women's super-G at the XIV Paralympic Winter Games
- Paralympic alpine skiing
- Venue: Tofane Alpine Skiing Centre
- Dates: 9 March

Women's super-G (visually impaired) at the XIV Paralympic Winter Games
- Competitors: 9 from 7 nations

Medalists
1st place, gold medalist(s)		Chiara Mazzel; Guide: Nicola Cotti Cottini	Italy
2nd place, silver medalist(s)		Veronika Aigner; Guide: Lilly Sammer	Austria
3rd place, bronze medalist(s)		Alexandra Rexová; Guide: Sophia Polák	Slovakia

Women's super-G (standing) at the XIV Paralympic Winter Games
- Competitors: 15 from 10 nations

Medalists
1st place, gold medalist(s)		Varvara Voronchikhina	Russia
2nd place, silver medalist(s)		Aurélie Richard	France
3rd place, bronze medalist(s)		Ebba Årsjö	Sweden

Women's super-G (sitting) at the XIV Paralympic Winter Games
- Competitors: 7 from 5 nations

Medalists
1st place, gold medalist(s)		Audrey Pascual	Spain
2nd place, silver medalist(s)		Momoka Muraoka	Japan
3rd place, bronze medalist(s)		Liu Sitong	China

The women's super-G competition of the 2026 Winter Paralympics was held on 9 March 2026 at the Tofane Alpine Skiing Centre.

== Medal table ==
* Host nation (Italy)

Rank	Nation	Gold	Silver	Bronze	Total
1	Italy (ITA)*	1	0	0	1
1	Russia (RUS)	1	0	0	1
1	Spain (ESP)	1	0	0	1
4	Austria (AUT)	0	1	0	1
4	France (FRA)	0	1	0	1
4	Japan (JPN)	0	1	0	1
7	China (CHN)	0	0	1	1
7	Slovakia (SVK)	0	0	1	1
7	Sweden (SWE)	0	0	1	1
Totals (9 entries)		3	3	3	9

== Visually impaired ==
In the super-G visually impaired, the athlete with a visual impairement has a sighted guide. The two skiers are considered a team, and dual medals are awarded.

Rank	Bib	Name	Country	Time	Difference
1st place, gold medalist(s)	1	Chiara Mazzel; Guide: Nicola Cotti Cottini	Italy	1:14.84	
2nd place, silver medalist(s)	2	Veronika Aigner; Guide: Lilly Sammer	Austria	1:15.44	+0.60
3rd place, bronze medalist(s)	6	Alexandra Rexová; Guide: Sophia Polák	Slovakia	1:19.69	+4.85
4	7	Martina Vozza; Guide: Ylenia Sabidussi	Italy	1:20.59	+5.75
5	4	Sara Choi; Guide: Eo Eun-mi	South Korea	1:21.17	+6.33
6	3	Menna Fitzpatrick; Guide: Katie Guest	Great Britain	1:25.52	+10.68
7	8	Eva Nikou; Guide: Dimitris Profentzas	Greece	1:25.99	+11.15
8	9	Meg Gustafson; Guide: Spencer Gustafson	United States	1:26.01	+11.17
	5	Elina Stary; Guide: Stefan Winter	Austria	Did not finish	

== Standing ==
Rank	Bib	Name	Country	Time	Difference
1st place, gold medalist(s)	12	Varvara Voronchikhina	Russia	1:15.60	
2nd place, silver medalist(s)	14	Aurélie Richard	France	1:17.56	+1.96
3rd place, bronze medalist(s)	11	Ebba Årsjö	Sweden	1:17.64	+2.04
4	20	Andrea Rothfuss	Germany	1:18.95	+3.35
5	15	Zhu Wenjing	China	1:19.73	+4.13
6	21	Claire Petit	Netherlands	1:20.34	+4.74
7	16	Kelsey O'Driscoll	United States	1:20.52	+4.92
8	19	Audrey Crowley	United States	1:22.93	+7.33
9	10	Michaela Gosselin	Canada	1:22.99	+7.39
10	17	Ammi Hondo	Japan	1:23.62	+8.02
11	18	Anna-Maria Rieder	Germany	1:24.28	+8.68
12	23	Guo Jiaxin	China	1:29.52	+13.92
13	24	Allie Johnson	United States	1:30.46	+14.86
	13	Zhang Mengqiu	China	Did not finish	
	22	Sheina Vaspi	Israel	Did not finish	

== Sitting ==
Rank	Bib	Name	Country	Time	Difference
1st place, gold medalist(s)	26	Audrey Pascual	Spain	1:17.82	
2nd place, silver medalist(s)	27	Momoka Muraoka	Japan	1:24.14	+6.32
3rd place, bronze medalist(s)	28	Liu Sitong	China	1:24.91	+7.09
4	31	Anna Soens	United States	1:27.37	+9.55
5	30	Saylor O'Brien	United States	1:31.50	+13.68
	25	Zhang Wenjing	China	Did not finish	
	29	Anna-Lena Forster	Germany	Did not finish	

== See also ==
- Alpine skiing at the 2026 Winter Olympics
