= Para alpine skiing at the 2026 Winter Paralympics – Women's super combined =

Women's super combined at the XIV Paralympic Winter Games
- Paralympic alpine skiing
- Venue: Tofane Alpine Skiing Centre
- Dates: 10 March

Women's super combined (visually impaired) at the XIV Paralympic Winter Games
- Competitors: 9 from 7 nations

Medalists
1st place, gold medalist(s)		Veronika Aigner; Guide: Lilly Sammer	Austria
2nd place, silver medalist(s)		Chiara Mazzel; Guide: Nicola Cotti Cottini	Italy
3rd place, bronze medalist(s)		Elina Stary; Guide: Stefan Winter	Austria

Women's super combined (standing) at the XIV Paralympic Winter Games
- Competitors: 15 from 10 nations

Medalists
1st place, gold medalist(s)		Ebba Årsjö	Sweden
2nd place, silver medalist(s)		Aurélie Richard	France
3rd place, bronze medalist(s)		Zhu Wenjing	China

Women's super combined (sitting) at the XIV Paralympic Winter Games
- Competitors: 7 from 5 nations

Medalists
1st place, gold medalist(s)		Audrey Pascual	Spain
2nd place, silver medalist(s)		Anna-Lena Forster	Germany
3rd place, bronze medalist(s)		Liu Sitong	China

The women's super combined competition of the 2026 Winter Paralympics was held on 10 March 2026 at the Tofane Alpine Skiing Centre.

== Medal table ==
* Host nation (Italy)

Rank	Nation	Gold	Silver	Bronze	Total
1	Austria (AUT)	1	0	1	2
2	Spain (ESP)	1	0	0	1
2	Sweden (SWE)	1	0	0	1
4	France (FRA)	0	1	0	1
4	Germany (GER)	0	1	0	1
4	Italy (ITA)*	0	1	0	1
7	China (CHN)	0	0	2	2
Totals (7 entries)		3	3	3	9

== Visually impaired ==
In the super combined visually impaired, the athlete with a visual impairement has a sighted guide. The two skiers are considered a team, and dual medals are awarded.

Rank	Bib	Name	Country	Super-G	Rank	Slalom	Rank	Total	Difference
1st place, gold medalist(s)	3	Veronika Aigner; Guide: Lilly Sammer	Austria	1:16.54	1	45.21	1	2:01.75	–
2nd place, silver medalist(s)	2	Chiara Mazzel; Guide: Nicola Cotti Cottini	Italy	1:17.60	2	47.21	4	2:04.81	+3.06
3rd place, bronze medalist(s)	4	Elina Stary; Guide: Stefan Winter	Austria	1:19.31	3	46.34	2	2:05.65	+3.90
4	6	Alexandra Rexová; Guide: Matúš Ďuriš	Slovakia	1:22.27	4	46.98	3	2:09.25	+7.50
5	1	Martina Vozza; Guide: Ylenia Sabidussi	Italy	1:23.08	6	47.43	5	2:10.51	+8.76
6	5	Sara Choi; Guide: Eo Eun-mi	South Korea	1:22.89	5	50.97	7	2:13.86	+12.11
7	9	Meg Gustafson; Guide: Spencer Gustafson	United States	1:26.19	7	51.30	8	2:17.49	+15.74
8	8	Eva Nikou; Guide: Dimitris Profentzas	Greece	1:27.48	8	52.00	9	2:19.48	+17.73
9	7	Menna Fitzpatrick; Guide: Katie Guest	Great Britain	1:30.44	9	50.44	6	2:20.88	+19.13

== Standing ==
Rank	Bib	Name	Country	Super-G	Rank	Slalom	Rank	Total	Difference
1st place, gold medalist(s)	11	Ebba Årsjö	Sweden	1:15.85	1	44.30	1	2:00.15	–
2nd place, silver medalist(s)	14	Aurélie Richard	France	1:17.90	2	49.28	6	2:07.18	+7.03
3rd place, bronze medalist(s)	12	Zhu Wenjing	China	1:21.73	4	48.96	4	2:10.69	+10.54
4	15	Zhang Mengqiu	China	1:22.09	5	48.78	3	2:10.87	+10.72
5	20	Audrey Crowley	United States	1:22.32	6	49.98	8	2:12.30	+12.15
6	19	Andrea Rothfuss	Germany	1:23.24	8	49.07	5	2:12.31	+12.16
7	10	Michaela Gosselin	Canada	1:23.86	9	49.33	7	2:13.19	+13.04
8	16	Kelsey O'Driscoll	United States	1:19.56	3	53.84	11	2:13.40	+13.25
9	18	Ammi Hondo	Japan	1:24.62	10	50.42	9	2:15.04	+14.89
10	17	Claire Petit	Netherlands	1:23.00	7	52.24	10	2:15.24	+15.09
11	21	Anna-Maria Rieder	Germany	1:28.60	12	47.35	2	2:15.95	+15.80
12	22	Sheina Vaspi	Israel	1:28.31	11	57.97	13	2:26.28	+26.13
13	24	Allie Johnson	United States	1:29.54	13	57.30	12	2:26.84	+26.69
	23	Guo Jiaxin	China	1:30.06	14	DNF		—	
	13	Varvara Voronchikhina	Russia	DNF		—			

== Sitting ==
Rank	Bib	Name	Country	Super-G	Rank	Slalom	Rank	Total	Difference
1st place, gold medalist(s)	29	Audrey Pascual	Spain	1:21.88	1	49.34	4	2:11.22	–
2nd place, silver medalist(s)	27	Anna-Lena Forster	Germany	1:24.70	2	46.98	2	2:11.68	+0.46
3rd place, bronze medalist(s)	26	Liu Sitong	China	1:26.29	3	48.24	3	2:14.53	+3.31
4	28	Zhang Wenjing	China	1:31.71	6	46.89	1	2:18.60	+7.38
5	25	Momoka Muraoka	Japan	1:29.44	4	53.22	5	2:22.66	+11.44
	31	Anna Soens	United States	1:29.48	5	DNF		—	
	30	Saylor O'Brien	United States	1:33.28	7	DNF		—	

== See also ==
- Alpine skiing at the 2026 Winter Olympics
