= Para alpine skiing at the 2026 Winter Paralympics – Men's slalom =

Men's slalom at the XIV Paralympic Winter Games
- Paralympic alpine skiing
- Venue: Tofane Alpine Skiing Centre
- Dates: 15 March

Men's slalom (visually impaired) at the XIV Paralympic Winter Games
- Competitors: 18 from 13 nations

Medalists
1st place, gold medalist(s)		Giacomo Bertagnolli; Guide: Andrea Ravelli	Italy
2nd place, silver medalist(s)		Michał Gołaś; Guide: Kacper Walas	Poland
3rd place, bronze medalist(s)		Kalle Ericsson; Guide: Sierra Smith	Canada

Men's slalom (standing) at the XIV Paralympic Winter Games
- Competitors: 34 from 20 nations

Medalists
1st place, gold medalist(s)		Alexey Bugaev	Russia
2nd place, silver medalist(s)		Adam Hall	New Zealand
3rd place, bronze medalist(s)		Robin Cuche	Switzerland

Men's slalom (sitting) at the XIV Paralympic Winter Games
- Competitors: 34 from 22 nations

Medalists
1st place, gold medalist(s)		Jeroen Kampschreur	Netherlands
2nd place, silver medalist(s)		Jesper Pedersen	Norway
3rd place, bronze medalist(s)		Takeshi Suzuki	Japan

The Men's slalom competition of the 2026 Winter Paralympics was held on 15 March 2026 at the Tofane Alpine Skiing Centre.

== Medal table ==
* Host nation (Italy)

Rank	Nation	Gold	Silver	Bronze	Total
1	Italy (ITA)*	1	0	0	1
1	Netherlands (NED)	1	0	0	1
1	Russia (RUS)	1	0	0	1
4	New Zealand (NZL)	0	1	0	1
4	Norway (NOR)	0	1	0	1
4	Poland (POL)	0	1	0	1
7	Canada (CAN)	0	0	1	1
7	Japan (JPN)	0	0	1	1
7	Switzerland (SUI)	0	0	1	1
Totals (9 entries)		3	3	3	9

== Visually impaired ==
In the slalom visually impaired, the athlete with a visual impairement has a sighted guide. The two skiers are considered a team, and dual medals are awarded.

Rank	Bib	Name	Country	Run 1	Rank	Run 2	Rank	Total	Difference
1st place, gold medalist(s)	1	Giacomo Bertagnolli; Guide: Andrea Ravelli	Italy	46.08	2	43.21	1	1:29.29	
2nd place, silver medalist(s)	4	Michał Gołaś; Guide: Kacper Walas	Poland	45.51	1	44.05	2	1:29.56	+0.27
3rd place, bronze medalist(s)	2	Kalle Ericsson; Guide: Sierra Smith	Canada	46.45	3	44.81	3	1:31.26	+1.97
4	7	Johannes Aigner; Guide: Nico Haberl	Austria	47.73	4	46.43	4	1:34.16	+4.87
5	10	Wang Xingdong; Guide: Chen Zhicheng	China	50.95	5	48.05	5	1:39.00	+9.71
6	5	Hyacinthe Deleplace; Guide: Perrine Clair	France	51.46	6	48.68	6	1:40.14	+10.85
7	12	Hwang Min-gyu; Guide: Kim Jun-hyeong	South Korea	52.65	7	50.14	8	1:42.79	+13.50
8	9	Tadeáš Kříž; Guide: Iva Křížová	Czech Republic	53.46	8	50.04	7	1:43.50	+14.21
9	11	Alexander Rauen; Guide: Jeremias Wilke	Germany	54.28	9	50.57	9	1:44.85	+15.56
10	16	Maximilien Seeger; Guide: Jeremy Mestdagh	Belgium	54.73	10	51.07	10	1:45.80	+16.51
11	14	Marek Kubačka; Guide: Mária Zaťovičová	Slovakia	55.69	11	51.12	11	1:46.81	+17.52
12	13	Sam Cozens; Guide: Adam Hall	Great Britain	55.97	12	52.95	12	1:48.92	+19.63
13	18	Patrik Hetmer; Guide: Miroslav Máčala	Czech Republic	1:12.24	13	1:04.83	13	2:17.07	+47.78
	3	Michael Scharnagl; Guide: Lilly Sammer	Austria	DNF		—			
	6	Neil Simpson; Guide: Rob Poth	Great Britain	DNF		—			
	8	Miroslav Haraus; Guide: Maroš Hudík	Slovakia	DNF		—			
	15	Dong Yiheng; Guide: Che Hang	China	DNF		—			
	17	Petar Kordić; Guide: Marija Coch	Croatia	DNF		—			

== Standing ==
Rank	Bib	Name	Country	Run 1	Rank	Run 2	Rank	Total	Difference
1st place, gold medalist(s)	24	Alexey Bugaev	Russia	45.39	1	43.16	2	1:28.55	
2nd place, silver medalist(s)	23	Adam Hall	New Zealand	47.80	4	43.58	4	1:31.38	+2.83
3rd place, bronze medalist(s)	19	Robin Cuche	Switzerland	48.34	6	43.39	3	1:31.73	+3.18
4	27	Jules Segers	France	47.40	3	44.89	6	1:32.29	+3.74
5	21	Thomas Grochar	Austria	48.49	7	43.91	5	1:32.40	+3.85
6	20	Oscar Burnham	France	48.11	5	44.98	7	1:33.09	+4.54
7	28	Christoph Glötzner	Germany	49.46	9	45.47	8	1:34.93	+6.38
8	30	Davide Bendotti	Italy	49.25	8	45.76	9	1:35.01	+6.46
9	34	Luca Palla	Italy	49.96	10	46.31	10	1:36.27	+7.72
10	29	Manuel Rachbauer	Austria	51.02	12	46.66	11	1:37.68	+9.13
11	25	Arthur Bauchet	France	56.09	20	41.81	1	1:37.90	+9.35
12	26	Jordan Broisin	France	50.93	11	47.04	13	1:37.97	+9.42
13	33	Jesse Keefe	United States	51.40	13	46.73	12	1:38.13	+9.58
14	32	Emerick Sierro	Switzerland	52.38	16	47.63	14	1:40.01	+11.46
15	35	Patrick Halgren	United States	51.89	15	48.92	17	1:40.81	+12.26
16	31	Arvid Skoglund	Sweden	51.50	14	49.67	18	1:41.17	+12.62
17	38	Théo Gmür	Switzerland	53.37	17	48.83	16	1:42.20	+13.65
18	40	Gakuta Koike	Japan	55.59	18	48.74	15	1:44.33	+15.78
19	41	Dominic Allen	Great Britain	55.94	19	50.05	19	1:45.99	+17.44
20	43	Michael Milton	Australia	58.40	22	54.53	20	1:52.93	+24.38
21	48	Martin Čupka	Slovakia	1:01.88	24	58.19	21	2:00.07	+31.52
22	49	Andrei Popa	Romania	1:07.67	25	1:05.21	22	2:12.88	+44.33
23	51	Luka Bilčar	Serbia	1:10.81	26	1:07.33	23	2:18.14	+49.59
	22	Federico Pelizzari	Italy	47.05	2	DNF		—	
	39	Tyler McKenzie	United States	57.70	21	DNF		—	
	44	Tomáš Vaverka	Czech Republic	1:01.84	23	DNF		—	
	36	Roger Puig	Andorra	DNF		—			
	37	Spencer Wood	United States	DNF		—			
	42	Noah Bury	United States	DNF		—			
	45	Sun Hongsheng	China	DNF		—			
	47	Li Biao	China	DNF		—			
	50	Byambadorjiin Tserenpuntsag	Mongolia	DNF		—			
	52	Maksym Heliuta	Ukraine	DNF		—			
	46	Yan Gong	China	DSQ		—			

== Sitting ==
Rank	Bib	Name	Country	Run 1	Rank	Run 2	Rank	Total	Difference
1st place, gold medalist(s)	53	Jeroen Kampschreur	Netherlands	45.27	1	44.45	5	1:29.72	
2nd place, silver medalist(s)	59	Jesper Pedersen	Norway	47.29	2	43.82	2	1:31.11	+1.39
3rd place, bronze medalist(s)	55	Takeshi Suzuki	Japan	47.65	3	43.65	1	1:31.30	+1.58
4	57	Taiki Morii	Japan	47.97	4	44.03	4	1:32.00	+2.28
5	54	Lou Braz-Dagand	France	48.76	6	44.73	7	1:33.49	+3.77
6	67	Liang Zilu	China	49.57	7	44.46	6	1:34.03	+4.31
7	65	Chen Liang	China	50.15	11	43.93	3	1:34.08	+4.36
8	62	Kurt Oatway	Canada	48.61	5	45.94	11	1:34.55	+4.83
9	63	Josh Hanlon	Australia	50.02	10	44.76	8	1:34.78	+5.06
10	58	René De Silvestro	Italy	50.35	12	45.01	9	1:35.36	+5.64
11	60	Dino Sokolović	Croatia	50.78	13	45.66	10	1:36.44	+6.72
12	69	Li Xiang	China	49.84	9	48.26	13	1:38.10	+8.38
13	74	Christophe Damas	Switzerland	54.43	14	48.01	12	1:42.44	+12.72
14	71	Thijn Speksnijder	Netherlands	54.53	15	51.96	15	1:46.49	+16.77
15	68	Ravi Drugan	United States	59.07	18	50.86	14	1:49.93	+20.21
16	70	Petr Drahoš	Czech Republic	58.06	17	54.38	17	1:52.44	+22.72
17	82	Adam Nybo	Denmark	1:00.07	20	54.59	18	1:54.66	+24.94
18	76	Jasmin Bambur	United States	1:22.61	22	52.24	16	2:14.85	+45.13
	66	Magnus Valø Balchen	Norway	49.79	8	DNF		—	
	77	Elijah Primak	Sweden	57.06	16	DNF		—	
	75	Leon Gensert	Germany	59.32	19	DNF		—	
	81	Javier Arteaga	Spain	1:01.08	21	DSQ		—	
	56	Niels de Langen	Netherlands	DNF		—			
	61	Victor Pierrel	France	DNF		—			
	64	Nicolás Bisquertt	Chile	DNF		—			
	72	Matthew Ryan Brewer	United States	DNF		—			
	73	Pascal Christen	Switzerland	DNF		—			
	78	Robert Enigl	United States	DNF		—			
	79	Jérémie Prégardien	Belgium	DNF		—			
	80	Kyle Taulman	United States	DNF		—			
	83	Sebastian Rigby	Austria	DNF		—			
	84	Lee Hwan-kyung	South Korea	DNF		—			
	86	Enrique Plantey	Argentina	DNF		—			
	85	Zoran Jovanovski	North Macedonia	DSQ		—			

== See also ==
- Alpine skiing at the 2026 Winter Olympics
