= Para alpine skiing at the 2026 Winter Paralympics – Women's giant slalom =

Women's giant slalom at the XIV Paralympic Winter Games
- Paralympic alpine skiing
- Venue: Tofane Alpine Skiing Centre
- Dates: 12 March

Women's giant slalom (visually impaired) at the XIV Paralympic Winter Games
- Competitors: 15 from 11 nations

Medalists
1st place, gold medalist(s)		Veronika Aigner; Guide: Eric Digruber	Austria
2nd place, silver medalist(s)		Chiara Mazzel; Guide: Fabrizio Casal	Italy
3rd place, bronze medalist(s)		Elina Stary; Guide: Stefan Winter	Austria

Women's giant slalom (standing) at the XIV Paralympic Winter Games
- Competitors: 22 from 16 nations

Medalists
1st place, gold medalist(s)		Ebba Årsjö	Sweden
2nd place, silver medalist(s)		Varvara Voronchikhina	Russia
3rd place, bronze medalist(s)		Aurélie Richard	France

Women's giant slalom (sitting) at the XIV Paralympic Winter Games
- Competitors: 16 from 11 nations

Medalists
1st place, gold medalist(s)		Anna-Lena Forster	Germany
2nd place, silver medalist(s)		Momoka Muraoka	Japan
3rd place, bronze medalist(s)		Liu Sitong	China

The Women's giant slalom competition of the 2026 Winter Paralympics was held on 12 March 2026 at the Tofane Alpine Skiing Centre.

== Medal table ==
* Host nation (Italy)

Rank	Nation	Gold	Silver	Bronze	Total
1	Austria (AUT)	1	0	1	2
2	Germany (GER)	1	0	0	1
2	Sweden (SWE)	1	0	0	1
4	Italy (ITA)*	0	1	0	1
4	Japan (JPN)	0	1	0	1
4	Russia (RUS)	0	1	0	1
7	China (CHN)	0	0	1	1
7	France (FRA)	0	0	1	1
Totals (8 entries)		3	3	3	9

== Visually impaired ==
In the giant slalom visually impaired, the athlete with a visual impairement has a sighted guide. The two skiers are considered a team, and dual medals are awarded.

Rank	Bib	Name	Country	Run 1	Rank	Run 2	Rank	Total	Difference
1st place, gold medalist(s)	5	Veronika Aigner; Guide: Eric Digruber	Austria	1:07.09	1	1:11.54	2	2:18.63	
2nd place, silver medalist(s)	2	Chiara Mazzel; Guide: Fabrizio Casal	Italy	1:10.11	2	1:11.08	1	2:21.19	+2.56
3rd place, bronze medalist(s)	7	Elina Stary; Guide: Stefan Winter	Austria	1:10.81	3	1:14.49	3	2:25.30	+6.67
4	3	Alexandra Rexová; Guide: Matúš Ďuriš	Slovakia	1:14.59	5	1:15.88	4	2:30.47	+11.84
5	1	Meg Gustafson; Guide: Spencer Gustafson	United States	1:14.53	4	1:18.36	5	2:32.89	+14.26
6	6	Menna Fitzpatrick; Guide: Katie Guest	Great Britain	1:16.92	7	1:19.59	6	2:36.51	+17.88
7	8	Sara Choi; Guide: Eo Eun-mi	South Korea	1:19.10	9	1:19.68	7	2:38.78	+20.15
8	9	Eva Nikou; Guide: Dimitris Profentzas	Greece	1:18.94	8	1:22.56	8	2:41.50	+22.87
9	13	Maya Fügenschuh; Guide: Johanna Holzmann	Germany	1:27.26	11	1:27.82	9	2:55.08	+36.45
10	11	Georgia Gunew; Guide: Ethan Jackson	Australia	1:31.02	12	1:30.34	10	3:01.36	+42.73
11	15	Alejandra Requesens; Guide: Victoria Ibáñez	Spain	1:43.71	13	1:38.01	11	3:21.72	+1:03.09
	4	Martina Vozza; Guide: Ylenia Sabidussi	Italy	1:14.63	6	DNF		—	
	10	Oliwia Gołaś; Guide: Andrzej Stasik	Poland	1:20.80	10	DSQ		—	
	12	Hester Poole; Guide: Ali Hall	Great Britain	DNF		—			
	14	Viktória Balážová; Guide: Alica Jakubeková	Slovakia	DNF		—			

== Standing ==
Rank	Bib	Name	Country	Run 1	Rank	Run 2	Rank	Total	Difference
1st place, gold medalist(s)	17	Ebba Årsjö	Sweden	1:10.14	1	1:12.28	1	2:22.42	
2nd place, silver medalist(s)	18	Varvara Voronchikhina	Russia	1:11.61	2	1:13.65	2	2:25.26	+2.84
3rd place, bronze medalist(s)	16	Aurélie Richard	France	1:12.22	3	1:14.82	4	2:27.04	+4.62
4	21	Andrea Rothfuss	Germany	1:13.69	4	1:14.04	3	2:27.73	+5.31
5	19	Zhang Mengqiu	China	1:14.59	5	1:17.11	7	2:31.70	+9.28
6	26	Zhu Wenjing	China	1:15.25	6	1:16.69	6	2:31.94	+9.52
7	22	Anna-Maria Rieder	Germany	1:15.28	7	1:16.68	5	2:31.96	+9.54
8	23	Michaela Gosselin	Canada	1:18.10	10	1:19.98	8	2:38.08	+15.66
9	24	Kelsey O'Driscoll	United States	1:18.42	11	1:21.02	9	2:39.44	+17.02
10	30	Ammi Hondo	Japan	1:19.03	12	1:22.32	11	2:41.35	+18.93
11	29	Lucija Smetiško	Croatia	1:21.72	14	1:21.88	10	2:43.60	+21.18
12	28	Allie Johnson	United States	1:20.37	13	1:25.86	13	2:46.23	+23.81
13	31	Florence Carrier	Canada	1:25.70	16	1:25.17	12	2:50.87	+28.45
14	33	Liana France	Australia	1:26.69	17	1:29.76	14	2:56.45	+34.03
15	35	Laura Streng	Austria	1:28.27	18	1:32.07	15	3:00.34	+37.92
16	36	Stela Yanchovichina	Bulgaria	1:39.21	19	1:43.83	16	3:23.04	+1:00.62
17	37	Yulduz Makhmudova	Uzbekistan	1:46.64	20	1:47.77	17	3:34.41	+1:11.99
	27	María Martín-Granizo	Spain	1:16.24	9	DNF		—	
	25	Claire Petit	Netherlands	1:15.95	8	DSQ		—	
	32	Guo Jiaxin	China	1:23.60	15	DSQ		—	
	34	Ilma Kazazić	Bosnia and Herzegovina	DNF		—			
	20	Audrey Crowley	United States	DSQ		—			

== Sitting ==
Rank	Bib	Name	Country	Run 1	Rank	Run 2	Rank	Total	Difference
1st place, gold medalist(s)	43	Anna-Lena Forster	Germany	1:15.12	1	1:15.52	1	2:30.64	
2nd place, silver medalist(s)	42	Momoka Muraoka	Japan	1:15.66	2	1:16.26	2	2:31.92	+1.28
3rd place, bronze medalist(s)	40	Liu Sitong	China	1:16.38	3	1:18.41	4	2:34.79	+4.15
4	41	Nette Kiviranta	Finland	1:19.11	4	1:17.30	3	2:36.41	+5.77
5	38	Barbara van Bergen	Netherlands	1:19.96	5	1:24.16	5	2:44.12	+13.48
6	48	Zhang Wenjing	China	1:24.19	7	1:25.49	6	2:49.68	+19.04
7	49	Marte Goossen	Belgium	1:25.97	9	1:29.36	7	2:55.33	+24.69
8	53	Christina Obwexer	Austria	1:27.72	12	1:30.90	8	2:58.62	+27.98
9	45	Hailey Griffin	United States	1:26.91	10	1:31.86	9	2:58.77	+28.13
10	52	Park Chae-yi	South Korea	1:32.32	13	1:34.08	10	3:06.40	+35.76
11	50	Iraide Rodríguez	Spain	1:34.06	14	1:37.20	11	3:11.26	+40.62
	44	Anna Soens	United States	1:21.75	6	DNF		—	
	46	Saylor O'Brien	United States	1:25.34	8	DNF		—	
	47	Laurie Stephens	United States	1:27.03	11	DNF		—	
	39	Audrey Pascual	Spain	DNF		—			
	51	Sarah Hundert	Liechtenstein	DNF		—			

== See also ==
- Alpine skiing at the 2026 Winter Olympics
