= Para alpine skiing at the 2026 Winter Paralympics – Women's downhill =

Women's downhill at the XIV Paralympic Winter Games
- Paralympic alpine skiing
- Venue: Tofane Alpine Skiing Centre
- Dates: 7 March

Women's downhill (visually impaired) at the XIV Paralympic Winter Games
- Competitors: 7 from 6 nations

Medalists
1st place, gold medalist(s)		Veronika Aigner; Guide: Lilly Sammer	Austria
2nd place, silver medalist(s)		Chiara Mazzel; Guide: Nicola Cotti Cottini	Italy
3rd place, bronze medalist(s)		Alexandra Rexová; Guide: Sophia Polák	Slovakia

Women's downhill (standing) at the XIV Paralympic Winter Games
- Competitors: 12 from 8 nations

Medalists
1st place, gold medalist(s)		Ebba Årsjö	Sweden
2nd place, silver medalist(s)		Aurélie Richard	France
3rd place, bronze medalist(s)		Varvara Voronchikhina	Russia

Women's downhill (sitting) at the XIII Paralympic Winter Games
- Competitors: 7 from 5 nations

Medalists
1st place, gold medalist(s)		Anna-Lena Forster	Germany
2nd place, silver medalist(s)		Audrey Pascual	Spain
3rd place, bronze medalist(s)		Liu Sitong	China

The Women's downhill competition of the 2026 Winter Paralympics was held on 7 March 2026 at the Tofane Alpine Skiing Centre.

== Medal table ==
* Host nation (Italy)

Rank	Nation	Gold	Silver	Bronze	Total
1	Austria (AUT)	1	0	0	1
1	Germany (GER)	1	0	0	1
1	Sweden (SWE)	1	0	0	1
4	France (FRA)	0	1	0	1
4	Italy (ITA)*	0	1	0	1
4	Spain (ESP)	0	1	0	1
7	China (CHN)	0	0	1	1
7	Russia (RUS)	0	0	1	1
7	Slovakia (SVK)	0	0	1	1
Totals (9 entries)		3	3	3	9

== Visually impaired ==
In the downhill visually impaired, the athlete with a visual impairement has a sighted guide. The two skiers are considered a team, and dual medals are awarded.

Rank	Bib	Name	Country	Time	Difference
1st place, gold medalist(s)	3	Veronika Aigner; Guide: Lilly Sammer	Austria	1:22.55	
2nd place, silver medalist(s)	4	Chiara Mazzel; Guide: Nicola Cotti Cottini	Italy	1:23.03	+0.48
3rd place, bronze medalist(s)	1	Alexandra Rexová; Guide: Sophia Polák	Slovakia	1:27.45	+4.90
4	5	Sara Choi; Guide: Eo Eun-mi	South Korea	1:29.03	+6.48
5	2	Martina Vozza; Guide: Ylenia Sabidussi	Italy	1:30.54	+7.99
6	7	Meg Gustafson; Guide: Spencer Gustafson	United States	1:32.69	+10.14
7	6	Eva Nikou; Guide: Dimitris Profentzas	Greece	1:36.07	+13.52

== Standing ==
Rank	Bib	Name	Country	Time	Difference
1st place, gold medalist(s)	14	Ebba Årsjö	Sweden	1:22.00	
2nd place, silver medalist(s)	11	Aurélie Richard	France	1:23.71	+1.71
3rd place, bronze medalist(s)	10	Varvara Voronchikhina	Russia	1:24.47	+2.47
4	9	Mollie Jepsen	Canada	1:26.10	+4.10
5	8	Michaela Gosselin	Canada	1:27.26	+5.26
6	13	Audrey Crowley	United States	1:27.49	+5.49
7	15	Claire Petit	Netherlands	1:28.29	+6.29
8	17	Zhang Mengqiu	China	1:29.66	+7.66
9	18	Zhu Wenjing	China	1:32.24	+10.24
10	19	Allie Johnson	United States	1:35.34	+13.34
	12	Kelsey O'Driscoll	United States	Did not finish	
	16	Ammi Hondo	Japan	Did not finish	

== Sitting ==
Rank	Bib	Name	Country	Time	Difference
1st place, gold medalist(s)	21	Anna-Lena Forster	Germany	1:25.79	
2nd place, silver medalist(s)	22	Audrey Pascual	Spain	1:25.84	+0.05
3rd place, bronze medalist(s)	25	Liu Sitong	China	1:31.27	+5.48
4	23	Zhang Wenjing	China	1:32.67	+6.88
5	24	Saylor O'Brien	United States	1:36.26	+10.47
	20	Barbara van Bergen	Netherlands	Did not finish	
	26	Anna Soens	United States	Did not finish	

== See also ==
- Alpine skiing at the 2026 Winter Olympics
