= Para alpine skiing at the 2026 Winter Paralympics – Men's downhill =

Men's downhill at the XIV Paralympic Winter Games
- Paralympic alpine skiing
- Venue: Tofane Alpine Skiing Centre
- Dates: 7 March

Men's downhill (visually impaired) at the XIV Paralympic Winter Games
- Competitors: 11 from 10 nations

Medalists
1st place, gold medalist(s)		Johannes Aigner; Guide: Nico Haberl	Austria
2nd place, silver medalist(s)		Kalle Ericsson; Guide: Sierra Smith	Canada
3rd place, bronze medalist(s)		Giacomo Bertagnolli; Guide: Andrea Ravelli	Italy

Men's downhill (standing) at the XIV Paralympic Winter Games
- Competitors: 27 from 13 nations

Medalists
1st place, gold medalist(s)		Robin Cuche	Switzerland
2nd place, silver medalist(s)		Arthur Bauchet	France
3rd place, bronze medalist(s)		Aleksei Bugaev	Russia

Men's downhill (sitting) at the XIV Paralympic Winter Games
- Competitors: 23 from 13 nations

Medalists
1st place, gold medalist(s)		Jesper Pedersen	Norway
2nd place, silver medalist(s)		Niels de Langen	Netherlands
3rd place, bronze medalist(s)		Kurt Oatway	Canada

The Men's downhill competition of the 2026 Winter Paralympics was held on 7 March 2026 at the Tofane Alpine Skiing Centre.

== Medal table ==
* Host nation (Italy)

Rank	Nation	Gold	Silver	Bronze	Total
1	Austria (AUT)	1	0	0	1
1	Norway (NOR)	1	0	0	1
1	Switzerland (SUI)	1	0	0	1
4	Canada (CAN)	0	1	1	2
5	France (FRA)	0	1	0	1
5	Netherlands (NED)	0	1	0	1
7	Italy (ITA)*	0	0	1	1
7	Russia (RUS)	0	0	1	1
Totals (8 entries)		3	3	3	9

== Visually impaired ==
In the downhill visually impaired, the athlete with a visual impairement has a sighted guide. The two skiers are considered a team, and dual medals are awarded.

Rank	Bib	Name	Country	Time	Difference
1st place, gold medalist(s)	2	Johannes Aigner; Guide: Nico Haberl	Austria	1:16.08	
2nd place, silver medalist(s)	3	Kalle Ericsson; Guide: Sierra Smith	Canada	1:18.33	+2.25
3rd place, bronze medalist(s)	5	Giacomo Bertagnolli; Guide: Andrea Ravelli	Italy	1:18.64	+2.56
4	4	Neil Simpson; Guide: Andrew Simpson	Great Britain	1:21.31	+5.23
5	8	Wang Xingdong; Guide: Chen Zhicheng	China	1:22.55	+6.47
6	9	Tadeáš Kříž; Guide: Iva Křížová	Czech Republic	1:25.79	+9.71
7	11	Fred Warburton; Guide: James Hannan	Great Britain	1:30.32	+14.24
	1	Hyacinthe Deleplace; Guide: Perrine Clair	France	Did not finish	
	6	Miroslav Haraus; Guide: Maroš Hudík	Slovakia	Did not finish	
	7	Hwang Min-gyu; Guide: Kim Jun-hyeong	South Korea	Did not finish	
	10	Maximilien Seeger; Guide: Jeremy Mestdagh	Belgium	Did not finish	

== Standing ==
Rank	Bib	Name	Country	Time	Difference
1st place, gold medalist(s)	13	Robin Cuche	Switzerland	1:17.79	
2nd place, silver medalist(s)	18	Arthur Bauchet	France	1:18.40	+0.61
3rd place, bronze medalist(s)	20	Alexey Bugaev	Russia	1:18.94	+1.15
4	12	Aaron Lindström	Sweden	1:19.30	+1.51
5	17	Roger Puig	Andorra	1:19.72	+1.93
6	28	Théo Gmür	Switzerland	1:20.04	+2.25
7	19	Jordan Broisin	France	1:20.10	+2.31
8	15	Markus Salcher	Austria	1:20.75	+2.96
9	24	Nico Pajantschitsch	Austria	1:20.79	+3.00
10	29	Jesse Keefe	United States	1:21.01	+3.22
11	27	Luca Palla	Italy	1:21.05	+3.26
12	14	Andrew Haraghey	United States	1:21.30	+3.51
13	22	Oscar Burnham	France	1:21.56	+3.77
14	25	Spencer Wood	United States	1:22.06	+4.27
15	31	Gakuta Koike	Japan	1:23.13	+5.34
16	30	Emerick Sierro	Switzerland	1:23.47	+5.68
17	37	Bernt Marius Rørstad	Norway	1:23.94	+6.15
18	32	Marcus Grasto Nilsson	Norway	1:25.39	+7.60
19	35	Yan Gong	China	1:27.98	+10.19
	16	Alexis Guimond	Canada	Did not finish	
	21	Federico Pelizzari	Italy	Did not finish	
	23	Patrick Halgren	United States	Did not finish	
	26	Manuel Rachbauer	Austria	Did not finish	
	33	Tyler McKenzie	United States	Did not finish	
	34	Li Biao	China	Did not finish	
	36	Sun Hongsheng	China	Did not finish	
	38	Martin Čupka	Slovakia	Disqualified	

== Sitting ==
Rank	Bib	Name	Country	Time	Difference
1st place, gold medalist(s)	43	Jesper Pedersen	Norway	1:18.14	
2nd place, silver medalist(s)	41	Niels de Langen	Netherlands	1:19.24	+1.10
3rd place, bronze medalist(s)	42	Kurt Oatway	Canada	1:19.42	+1.28
4	49	René De Silvestro	Italy	1:20.53	+2.39
5	40	Corey Peters	New Zealand	1:20.89	+2.75
6	47	Takeshi Suzuki	Japan	1:21.27	+3.13
7	54	Liang Zilu	China	1:25.28	+7.14
8	56	Ravi Drugan	United States	1:26.09	+7.95
9	60	Robert Enigl	United States	1:26.14	+8.00
10	52	Thijn Speksnijder	Netherlands	1:26.22	+8.08
11	58	Chen Liang	China	1:29.18	+11.04
	39	Taiki Morii	Japan	Did not finish	
	44	Jeroen Kampschreur	Netherlands	Did not finish	
	46	Nicolás Bisquertt	Chile	Did not finish	
	48	Brian Rowland	Canada	Did not finish	
	50	Josh Hanlon	Australia	Did not finish	
	51	Enrique Plantey	Argentina	Did not finish	
	53	Pascal Christen	Switzerland	Did not finish	
	55	Christophe Damas	Switzerland	Did not finish	
	57	Blake Eaton	United States	Did not finish	
	59	David Williams	United States	Did not finish	
	61	Arly Velásquez	Mexico	Did not finish	
	45	Andrew Kurka	United States	Disqualified	

== See also ==
- Alpine skiing at the 2026 Winter Olympics
