= Para alpine skiing at the 2026 Winter Paralympics – Men's super-G =

Men's super-G at the XIV Paralympic Winter Games
- Paralympic alpine skiing
- Venue: Tofane Alpine Skiing Centre
- Dates: 9 March

Men's super-G (visually impaired) at the XIV Paralympic Winter Games
- Competitors: 14 from 12 nations

Medalists
1st place, gold medalist(s)		Johannes Aigner; Guide: Nico Haberl	Austria
2nd place, silver medalist(s)		Giacomo Bertagnolli; Guide: Andrea Ravelli	Italy
3rd place, bronze medalist(s)		Kalle Ericsson; Guide: Sierra Smith	Canada

Men's super-G (standing) at the XIV Paralympic Winter Games
- Competitors: 33 from 14 nations

Medalists
1st place, gold medalist(s)		Robin Cuche	Switzerland
2nd place, silver medalist(s)		Patrick Halgren	United States
3rd place, bronze medalist(s)		Jules Segers	France

Men's super-G (sitting) at the XIV Paralympic Winter Games
- Competitors: 27 from 16 nations

Medalists
1st place, gold medalist(s)		Jeroen Kampschreur	Netherlands
2nd place, silver medalist(s)		Jesper Pedersen	Norway
3rd place, bronze medalist(s)		Andrew Kurka	United States

The men's super-G competition of the 2026 Winter Paralympics was held on 9 March 2026 at the Tofane Alpine Skiing Centre.

== Medal table ==
* Host nation (Italy)

Rank	Nation	Gold	Silver	Bronze	Total
1	Austria (AUT)	1	0	0	1
1	Netherlands (NED)	1	0	0	1
1	Switzerland (SUI)	1	0	0	1
4	United States (USA)	0	1	1	2
5	Italy (ITA)*	0	1	0	1
5	Norway (NOR)	0	1	0	1
7	Canada (CAN)	0	0	1	1
7	France (FRA)	0	0	1	1
Totals (8 entries)		3	3	3	9

== Visually impaired ==
In the super-G visually impaired, the athlete with a visual impairement has a sighted guide. The two skiers are considered a team, and dual medals are awarded.

Rank	Bib	Name	Country	Time	Difference
1st place, gold medalist(s)	5	Johannes Aigner; Guide: Nico Haberl	Austria	1:11.99	
2nd place, silver medalist(s)	7	Giacomo Bertagnolli; Guide: Andrea Ravelli	Italy	1:12.15	+0.16
3rd place, bronze medalist(s)	2	Kalle Ericsson; Guide: Sierra Smith	Canada	1:13.29	+1.30
4	6	Neil Simpson; Guide: Rob Poth	Great Britain	1:14.39	+2.40
5	1	Hyacinthe Deleplace; Guide: Perrine Clair	France	1:16.75	+4.76
6	8	Michał Gołaś; Guide: Kacper Walas	Poland	1:16.77	+4.78
7	3	Wang Xingdong; Guide: Chen Zhicheng	China	1:17.43	+5.44
8	4	Hwang Min-gyu; Guide: Kim Jun-hyeong	South Korea	1:18.28	+6.29
9	14	Maximilien Seeger; Guide: Jeremy Mestdagh	Belgium	1:20.64	+8.65
10	11	Tadeáš Kříž; Guide: Iva Křížová	Czech Republic	1:21.46	+9.47
11	9	Alexander Rauen; Guide: Jeremias Wilke	Germany	1:23.41	+11.42
12	12	Fred Warburton; Guide: James Hannan	Great Britain	1:24.03	+12.04
	10	Miroslav Haraus; Guide: Maroš Hudík	Slovakia	Did not finish	
	13	Marek Kubačka; Guide: Mária Zaťovičová	Slovakia	Did not finish	

== Standing ==
Rank	Bib	Name	Country	Time	Difference
1st place, gold medalist(s)	16	Robin Cuche	Switzerland	1:12.12	
2nd place, silver medalist(s)	18	Patrick Halgren	United States	1:13.10	+0.98
3rd place, bronze medalist(s)	15	Jules Segers	France	1:13.59	+1.47
4	19	Alexey Bugaev	Russia	1:14.11	+1.99
5	24	Jordan Broisin	France	1:14.25	+2.13
6	22	Oscar Burnham	France	1:14.47	+2.35
7	29	Federico Pelizzari	Italy	1:14.48	+2.36
8	17	Thomas Grochar	Austria	1:14.52	+2.40
9	31	Davide Bendotti	Italy	1:14.86	+2.74
10	28	Nico Pajantschitsch	Austria	1:14.98	+2.86
11	23	Roger Puig	Andorra	1:15.11	+2.99
12	34	Luca Palla	Italy	1:15.81	+3.69
13	26	Théo Gmür	Switzerland	1:16.22	+4.10
14	35	Jesse Keefe	United States	1:17.25	+5.13
15	38	Emerick Sierro	Switzerland	1:17.42	+5.30
16	36	Gakuta Koike	Japan	1:17.76	+5.64
17	32	Marcus Grasto Nilsson	Norway	1:18.58	+6.46
18	37	Spencer Wood	United States	1:18.65	+6.53
19	30	Manuel Rachbauer	Austria	1:19.28	+7.16
20	47	Bernt Marius Rørstad	Norway	1:19.62	+7.50
21	39	Tyler McKenzie	United States	1:19.90	+7.78
22	42	Li Biao	China	1:21.78	+9.66
23	44	Michael Milton	Australia	1:21.98	+9.86
24	46	Martin Čupka	Slovakia	1:22.21	+10.09
25	40	Sun Hongsheng	China	1:23.63	+11.51
26	45	Ueli Rotach	Switzerland	1:29.46	+17.34
	20	Arthur Bauchet	France	Did not finish	
	21	Alexis Guimond	Canada	Did not finish	
	25	Aaron Lindström	Sweden	Did not finish	
	27	Markus Salcher	Austria	Did not finish	
	33	Andrew Haraghey	United States	Did not finish	
	41	Yan Gong	China	Did not finish	
	43	Arvid Skoglund	Sweden	Did not finish	

== Sitting ==
Rank	Bib	Name	Country	Time	Difference
1st place, gold medalist(s)	54	Jeroen Kampschreur	Netherlands	1:13.08	
2nd place, silver medalist(s)	53	Jesper Pedersen	Norway	1:13.80	+0.72
3rd place, bronze medalist(s)	52	Andrew Kurka	United States	1:13.95	+0.87
4	49	René De Silvestro	Italy	1:14.08	+1.00
5	60	Niels de Langen	Netherlands	1:14.54	+1.46
6	50	Corey Peters	New Zealand	1:15.42	+2.34
7	59	Takeshi Suzuki	Japan	1:15.45	+2.37
8	61	Nicolás Bisquertt	Chile	1:16.40	+3.32
9	62	Liang Zilu	China	1:16.86	+3.78
10	66	Pascal Christen	Switzerland	1:17.37	+4.29
11	51	Taiki Morii	Japan	1:18.34	+5.26
12	55	Magnus Valø Balchen	Norway	1:18.90	+5.82
13	56	Ravi Drugan	United States	1:20.29	+7.21
14	63	Robert Enigl	United States	1:21.06	+7.98
15	65	Arly Velásquez	Mexico	1:21.53	+8.45
16	64	Matthew Ryan Brewer	United States	1:22.03	+8.95
17	69	Thijn Speksnijder	Netherlands	1:22.67	+9.59
18	68	Jernej Slivnik	Slovenia	1:23.21	+10.13
19	70	Christophe Damas	Switzerland	1:23.32	+10.24
20	71	Blake Eaton	United States	1:25.83	+12.75
	48	Kurt Oatway	Canada	Did not finish	
	57	Lou Braz-Dagand	France	Did not finish	
	58	Enrique Plantey	Argentina	Did not finish	
	67	Josh Hanlon	Australia	Did not finish	
	72	Chen Liang	China	Did not finish	
	73	Petr Drahoš	Czech Republic	Did not finish	
	74	Brian Rowland	Canada	Did not finish	

== See also ==
- Alpine skiing at the 2026 Winter Olympics
