= Austria at the 2026 Winter Paralympics =

- Flag of Austria
- IPC code: AUT
- NPC: Austrian Paralympic Committee

in Milan & Cortina d'Ampezzo, Italy 6 March 2026 – 15 March 2026
- Competitors: 15 (11 men and 4 women) in 4 sports
- Flag bearers (opening): Veronika Aigner & Markus Salcher
- Flag bearers (closing): Veronika Aigner & Johannes Aigner
- Medals Ranked 5th: Gold 7 Silver 2 Bronze 4 Total 13

Winter Paralympics appearances (overview)
- 1976; 1980; 1984; 1988; 1992; 1994; 1998; 2002; 2006; 2010; 2014; 2018; 2022; 2026

Austria will compete at the 2026 Winter Paralympics in Milan & Cortina d'Ampezzo, Italy, which will take place between 6–15 March 2026.

== Medalists ==
The following Austria competitors won medals at the games. In the discipline sections below, the medalists' names are bolded.

Medal	Name	Sport	Event	Date
Gold	Veronika Aigner; Guide: Lilly Sammer	Para alpine skiing	Women's downhill, visually impaired	7 March
Gold	Johannes Aigner; Guide: Nico Haberl	Para alpine skiing	Men's downhill, visually impaired	7 March
Gold	Johannes Aigner; Guide: Nico Haberl	Para alpine skiing	Men's super-G, visually impaired	9 March
Gold	Veronika Aigner; Guide: Lilly Sammer	Para alpine skiing	Women's super combined, visually impaired	10 March
Gold	Veronika Aigner; Guide: Eric Digruber	Para alpine skiing	Women's giant slalom, visually impaired	12 March
Gold	Johannes Aigner; Guide: Nico Haberl	Para alpine skiing	Men's giant slalom, visually impaired	13 March
Gold	Veronika Aigner; Guide: Eric Digruber	Para alpine skiing	Women's slalom, visually impaired	14 March
Silver	Veronika Aigner; Guide: Lilly Sammer	Para alpine skiing	Women's super-G, visually impaired	9 March
Silver	Elina Stary; Guide: Stefan Winter	Para alpine skiing	Women's slalom, visually impaired	14 March
Bronze	Elina Stary; Guide: Stefan Winter	Para alpine skiing	Women's super combined, visually impaired	10 March
Bronze	Johannes Aigner; Guide: Nico Haberl	Para alpine skiing	Men's super combined, visually impaired	10 March
Bronze	Thomas Grochar	Para alpine skiing	Men's super combined, standing	10 March
Bronze	Elina Stary; Guide: Stefan Winter	Para alpine skiing	Women's giant slalom, visually impaired	12 March

Medals by sport
**Sport**	1st place, gold medalist(s)	2nd place, silver medalist(s)	3rd place, bronze medalist(s)	**Total**
para alpine skiing	7	2	4	**13**
Total	7	2	4	13

Medals by gender
**Gender**	1st place, gold medalist(s)	2nd place, silver medalist(s)	3rd place, bronze medalist(s)	**Total**
Female	4	2	2	**8**
Male	3	0	2	**5**
Mixed	0	0	0	**0**
Total	7	2	4	13

Medals by date
**Day**	**Date**	1st place, gold medalist(s)	2nd place, silver medalist(s)	3rd place, bronze medalist(s)	Total
Day 1	7 March	2	0	0	2
Day 2	8 March	0	0	0	0
Day 3	9 March	1	1	0	2
Day 4	10 March	1	0	3	4
Day 5	11 March	0	0	0	0
Day 6	12 March	1	0	1	2
Day 7	13 March	1	0	0	1
Day 8	14 March	1	1	0	2
Day 9	15 March	0	0	0	0
Total		7	2	4	13

== Competitors ==
The following is the list of number of competitors participating at the Games per sport/discipline.

Sport	Men	Women	Total
Para alpine skiing	7	4	11
Para biathlon	1	0	1
Para cross-country skiing	1	0	1
Para snowboard	3	0	3
Total	11	4	15

== Para alpine skiing ==
Men

Athlete	Class	Event	Run 1		Run 2		Total	
Athlete	Class	Event	Time	Rank	Time	Rank	Time	Rank
Johannes Aigner; Guide: Nico Haberl	AS2	Downhill, visually impaired	—N/a				1:16.08	1st place, gold medalist(s)
Johannes Aigner; Guide: Nico Haberl	AS2	Super-G, visually impaired	—N/a				1:11.99	1st place, gold medalist(s)
Johannes Aigner; Guide: Nico Haberl	AS2	Giant slalom, visually impaired	1:03.22	2	1:04.61	1	2:07.83	1st place, gold medalist(s)
Johannes Aigner; Guide: Nico Haberl	AS2	Slalom, visually impaired	47.73	4	46.43	4	1:34.16	4
Johannes Aigner; Guide: Nico Haberl	AS2	Super combined, visually impaired	1:13.98	3	43.48	4	1:57.46	3rd place, bronze medalist(s)
Thomas Grochar	LW2	Super-G, standing	—N/a				1:14.52	8
Thomas Grochar	LW2	Giant slalom, standing	DNF					
Thomas Grochar	LW2	Slalom, standing	48.49	7	43.91	5	1:32.40	5
Thomas Grochar	LW2	Super combined, standing	1:14.35	2	45.64	4	1:59.99	3rd place, bronze medalist(s)
Nico Pajantschitsch	LW6/8–2	Downhill, standing	—N/a				1:20.79	9
Nico Pajantschitsch	LW6/8–2	Super-G, standing	—N/a				1:14.98	10
Nico Pajantschitsch	LW6/8–2	Giant slalom, standing	1:09.18	11	1:07.76	8	2:16.94	8
Manuel Rachbauer	LW9–1	Downhill, standing	—N/a				DNF	
Manuel Rachbauer	LW9–1	Super-G, standing	—N/a				1:19.28	19
Manuel Rachbauer	LW9–1	Giant slalom, standing	1:12.77	18	1:13.69	19	2:26.46	18
Manuel Rachbauer	LW9–1	Slalom, standing	51.02	12	46.66	11	1:37.68	10
Manuel Rachbauer	LW9–1	Super combined, standing	DNF					
Sebastian Rigby	LW11	Giant slalom, sitting	1:19.35	19	1:18.80	17	2:38.15	18
Sebastian Rigby	LW11	Slalom, sitting	DNF					
Markus Salcher	LW9–1	Downhill, standing	—N/a				1:20.75	8
Markus Salcher	LW9–1	Super-G, standing	—N/a				DNF	
Markus Salcher	LW9–1	Giant slalom, standing	1:10.01	14	1:09.32	11	2:19.33	12
Michael Scharnagl; Guide: Lilly Sammer	AS2	Giant slalom, visually impaired	1:09.85	7	1:10.33	5	2:20.18	7
Michael Scharnagl; Guide: Lilly Sammer	AS2	Slalom, visually impaired	DNF					

Women

Athlete	Class	Event	Run 1		Run 2		Total	
Athlete	Class	Event	Time	Rank	Time	Rank	Time	Rank
Veronika Aigner; Guide: Lilly Sammer (downhill, super-G, super combined); Guide: Eric Digruber (giant slalom, slalom)	AS2	Downhill, visually impaired	—N/a				1:22.55	1st place, gold medalist(s)
Veronika Aigner; Guide: Lilly Sammer (downhill, super-G, super combined); Guide: Eric Digruber (giant slalom, slalom)	AS2	Super-G, visually impaired	—N/a				1:15.44	2nd place, silver medalist(s)
Veronika Aigner; Guide: Lilly Sammer (downhill, super-G, super combined); Guide: Eric Digruber (giant slalom, slalom)	AS2	Giant slalom, visually impaired	1:07.09	1	1:11.54	2	2:18.63	1st place, gold medalist(s)
Veronika Aigner; Guide: Lilly Sammer (downhill, super-G, super combined); Guide: Eric Digruber (giant slalom, slalom)	AS2	Slalom, visually impaired	40.72	1	42.01	1	1:22.73	1st place, gold medalist(s)
Veronika Aigner; Guide: Lilly Sammer (downhill, super-G, super combined); Guide: Eric Digruber (giant slalom, slalom)	AS2	Super combined, visually impaired	1:16.54	1	45.21	1	2:01.75	1st place, gold medalist(s)
Christina Obwexer	LW10–2	Giant slalom, sitting	1:27.72	12	1:30.90	8	2:58.62	8
Christina Obwexer	LW10–2	Slalom, sitting	57.16	10	58.01	10	1:55.17	10
Elina Stary; Guide: Stefan Winter	AS2	Super-G, visually impaired	—N/a				DNF	
Elina Stary; Guide: Stefan Winter	AS2	Giant slalom, visually impaired	1:10.81	3	1:14.49	3	2:25.30	3rd place, bronze medalist(s)
Elina Stary; Guide: Stefan Winter	AS2	Slalom, visually impaired	42.36	2	44.41	2	1:26.77	2nd place, silver medalist(s)
Elina Stary; Guide: Stefan Winter	AS2	Super combined, visually impaired	1:19.31	3	46.34	2	2:05.65	3rd place, bronze medalist(s)
Laura Streng	LW9–2	Giant slalom, standing	1:28.27	18	1:32.07	15	3:00.34	15
Laura Streng	LW9–2	Slalom, standing	55.84	16	55.92	15	1:51.76	15

== Para biathlon ==
Athlete	Class	Event	Qualification			Final		
Athlete	Class	Event	Missed shots	Time	Rank	Missed shots	Time	Rank
Stefan Egger-Riedmüller	LW4	Men's individual, standing	—N/a			3 (1+1+0+1)	36:34.3	14
Stefan Egger-Riedmüller	LW4	Men's sprint, standing	—N/a			1 (1+0)	20:13.2	15
Stefan Egger-Riedmüller	LW4	Men's sprint pursuit, standing	2 (0+2)	11:48.1	16 Q	1 (0+1)	14:21.2	15

== Para cross-country skiing ==
Men

Athlete	Class	Event	Qualification		Semifinal		Final	
Athlete	Class	Event	Time	Rank	Time	Rank	Time	Rank
Stefan Egger-Riedmüller	LW4	Men's sprint classical, standing	2:57.55	26	Did not advance			
Stefan Egger-Riedmüller	LW4	Men's 10 km classical, standing	—N/a				33:16.1	16

== Para snowboard ==
Banked slalom

Athlete	Event	Run 1	Run 2	Best	Rank
Oliver Dreier	Men's banked slalom, SB-UL	1:06.21	1:06.65	1:06.21	18
René Eckhart	Men's banked slalom, SB-LL1	1:13.77	1:12.01	1:12.01	15
Markus Schmidhofer	Men's banked slalom, SB-LL1	1:44.91	1:52.04	1:44.91	16

Snowboard cross

Athlete	Event	Seeding		Pre-heats	Quarterfinal	Semifinal	Final	
Athlete	Event	Time	Rank	Position	Position	Position	Position	Rank
Oliver Dreier	Men's snowboard cross, SB-UL	56.15	15	2 Q	DNF	Did not advance		
René Eckhart	Men's snowboard cross, SB-LL1	59.23	11	—N/a	4	Did not advance		

== See also ==
- Austria at the Paralympics
- Austria at the 2026 Winter Olympics
