= Para alpine skiing at the 2026 Winter Paralympics – Men's super combined =

Men's super combined at the XIV Paralympic Winter Games
- Paralympic alpine skiing
- Venue: Tofane Alpine Skiing Centre
- Dates: 10 March

Men's super combined (visually impaired) at the XIV Paralympic Winter Games
- Competitors: 13 from 12 nations

Medalists
1st place, gold medalist(s)		Giacomo Bertagnolli; Guide: Andrea Ravelli	Italy
2nd place, silver medalist(s)		Neil Simpson; Guide: Rob Poth	Great Britain
3rd place, bronze medalist(s)		Johannes Aigner; Guide: Nico Haberl	Austria

Men's super combined (standing) at the XIV Paralympic Winter Games
- Competitors: 26 from 13 nations

Medalists
1st place, gold medalist(s)		Arthur Bauchet	France
2nd place, silver medalist(s)		Federico Pelizzari	Italy
3rd place, bronze medalist(s)		Thomas Grochar	Austria

Men's super combined (sitting) at the XIV Paralympic Winter Games
- Competitors: 23 from 13 nations

Medalists
1st place, gold medalist(s)		Jeroen Kampschreur	Netherlands
2nd place, silver medalist(s)		René De Silvestro	Italy
3rd place, bronze medalist(s)		Niels de Langen	Netherlands

The men's super combined competition of the 2026 Winter Paralympics was held on 10 March 2026 at the Tofane Alpine Skiing Centre.

== Medal table ==
* Host nation (Italy)

Rank	Nation	Gold	Silver	Bronze	Total
1	Italy (ITA)*	1	2	0	3
2	Netherlands (NED)	1	0	1	2
3	France (FRA)	1	0	0	1
4	Great Britain (GBR)	0	1	0	1
5	Austria (AUT)	0	0	2	2
Totals (5 entries)		3	3	3	9

== Visually impaired ==
In the super combined visually impaired, the athlete with a visual impairement has a sighted guide. The two skiers are considered a team, and dual medals are awarded.

Rank	Bib	Name	Country	Super-G	Rank	Slalom	Rank	Total	Difference
1st place, gold medalist(s)	3	Giacomo Bertagnolli; Guide: Andrea Ravelli	Italy	1:13.53	1	42.89	3	1:56.42	
2nd place, silver medalist(s)	2	Neil Simpson; Guide: Rob Poth	Great Britain	1:14.55	4	42.52	1	1:57.07	+0.65
3rd place, bronze medalist(s)	6	Johannes Aigner; Guide: Nico Haberl	Austria	1:13.98	3	43.48	4	1:57.46	+1.04
4	1	Kalle Ericsson; Guide: Sierra Smith	Canada	1:13.73	2	43.78	5	1:57.51	+1.09
5	8	Michał Gołaś; Guide: Kacper Walas	Poland	1:19.41	7	42.62	2	2:02.03	+5.61
6	7	Wang Xingdong; Guide: Chen Zhicheng	China	1:19.44	8	46.10	6	2:05.54	+9.12
7	5	Hyacinthe Deleplace; Guide: Perrine Clair	France	1:17.43	5	49.19	8	2:06.62	+10.20
8	10	Miroslav Haraus; Guide: Maroš Hudík	Slovakia	1:18.83	6	52.54	11	2:11.37	+14.95
9	11	Tadeáš Kříž; Guide: Iva Křížová	Czech Republic	1:22.27	9	49.81	9	2:12.08	+15.66
10	14	Maximilien Seeger; Guide: Jeremy Mestdagh	Belgium	1:22.31	10	51.23	10	2:13.54	+17.12
11	9	Alexander Rauen; Guide: Jeremias Wilke	Germany	1:27.12	11	48.16	7	2:15.28	+18.86
	4	Hwang Min-gyu; Guide: Kim Jun-hyeong	South Korea	DNF		—			
	12	Fred Warburton; Guide: James Hannan	Great Britain	DNF		—			
	13	Marek Kubačka; Guide: Mária Zaťovičová	Slovakia	DNS		—			

== Standing ==
Rank	Bib	Name	Country	Super-G	Rank	Slalom	Rank	Total	Difference
1st place, gold medalist(s)	17	Arthur Bauchet	France	1:15.25	5	42.92	1	1:58.17	
2nd place, silver medalist(s)	24	Federico Pelizzari	Italy	1:15.37	6	44.00	2	1:59.37	+1.20
3rd place, bronze medalist(s)	19	Thomas Grochar	Austria	1:14.35	2	45.64	4	1:59.99	+1.82
4	15	Oscar Burnham	France	1:15.16	3	45.03	3	2:00.19	+2.02
5	25	Davide Bendotti	Italy	1:15.22	4	45.98	6	2:01.20	+3.03
6	29	Luca Palla	Italy	1:17.64	9	45.69	5	2:03.33	+5.16
7	18	Patrick Halgren	United States	1:16.46	8	48.16	8	2:04.62	+6.45
8	32	Spencer Wood	United States	1:18.90	10	46.70	7	2:05.60	+7.43
9	33	Emerick Sierro	Switzerland	1:19.04	11	50.40	11	2:09.44	+11.27
10	31	Gakuta Koike	Japan	1:21.95	12	48.95	9	2:10.90	+12.73
11	36	Yan Gong	China	1:23.35	16	49.53	10	2:12.88	+14.71
12	37	Li Biao	China	1:22.58	14	50.55	12	2:13.13	+14.96
13	39	Michael Milton	Australia	1:22.50	13	54.23	14	2:16.73	+18.56
14	35	Sun Hongsheng	China	1:26.85	17	50.87	13	2:17.72	+19.55
15	40	Martin Čupka	Slovakia	1:22.82	15	55.20	15	2:18.02	+19.85
	21	Alexey Bugaev	Russia	1:13.10	1	DNF		—	
	16	Jules Segers	France	1:15.69	7	DNF		—	
	20	Robin Cuche	Switzerland	DNF		—			
	22	Christoph Glötzner	Germany	DNF		—			
	23	Roger Puig	Andorra	DNF		—			
	26	Andrew Haraghey	United States	DNF		—			
	27	Manuel Rachbauer	Austria	DNF		—			
	28	Jordan Broisin	France	DNF		—			
	30	Jesse Keefe	United States	DNF		—			
	34	Tyler McKenzie	United States	DNF		—			
	38	Arvid Skoglund	Sweden	DNF		—			

== Sitting ==
Rank	Bib	Name	Country	Super-G	Rank	Slalom	Rank	Total	Difference
1st place, gold medalist(s)	47	Jeroen Kampschreur	Netherlands	1:12.50	1	43.83	6	1:56.33	
2nd place, silver medalist(s)	44	René De Silvestro	Italy	1:13.65	3	42.79	1	1:56.44	+0.11
3rd place, bronze medalist(s)	53	Niels de Langen	Netherlands	1:13.44	2	44.15	8	1:57.59	+1.26
4	43	Jesper Pedersen	Norway	1:14.73	4	44.02	7	1:58.75	+2.42
5	46	Taiki Morii	Japan	1:17.94	7	43.64	3	2:01.58	+5.25
6	45	Takeshi Suzuki	Japan	1:18.27	8	44.20	9	2:02.47	+6.14
7	51	Liang Zilu	China	1:19.09	9	43.81	5	2:02.90	+6.57
8	54	Lou Braz-Dagand	France	1:19.53	10	43.73	4	2:03.26	+6.93
9	48	Nicolás Bisquertt	Chile	1:17.07	6	46.74	10	2:03.81	+7.48
10	62	Chen Liang	China	1:21.22	14	43.54	2	2:04.76	+8.43
11	49	Ravi Drugan	United States	1:20.46	11	48.26	12	2:08.72	+12.39
12	58	Josh Hanlon	Australia	1:22.74	16	47.02	11	2:09.76	+13.43
13	50	Enrique Plantey	Argentina	1:20.73	12	50.52	13	2:11.25	+14.92
14	55	Robert Enigl	United States	1:22.47	15	50.66	14	2:13.13	+16.80
15	63	Petr Drahoš	Czech Republic	1:27.84	19	53.56	15	2:21.40	+25.07
	42	Andrew Kurka	United States	1:16.53	5	DNF		—	
	52	Magnus Valø Balchen	Norway	1:20.98	13	DNF		—	
	60	Christophe Damas	Switzerland	1:24.30	17	DNF		—	
	61	Blake Eaton	United States	1:25.87	18	DNF		—	
	41	Kurt Oatway	Canada	DNF		—			
	56	Matthew Ryan Brewer	United States	DNF		—			
	57	Pascal Christen	Switzerland	DNF		—			
	59	Thijn Speksnijder	Netherlands	DNF		—			
	64	Victor Pierrel	France	DNS		—			

== See also ==
- Alpine skiing at the 2026 Winter Olympics
