= Sweden at the 2026 Winter Paralympics =

- Flag of Sweden
- IPC code: SWE
- NPC: Swedish Paralympic Committee
- Website: https://parasport.se/

in Milan and Cortina d'Ampezzo, Italy 6 March 2026 – 15 March 2026
- Competitors: 14 (9 men and 5 women) in 4 sports
- Medals Ranked 10th: Gold 3 Silver 0 Bronze 4 Total 7

Winter Paralympics appearances (overview)
- 1976; 1980; 1984; 1988; 1992; 1994; 1998; 2002; 2006; 2010; 2014; 2018; 2022; 2026

Sweden will compete at the 2026 Winter Paralympics in Milan and Cortina d'Ampezzo, Italy, from 6 to 15 March 2026.

== Competitors ==
The following is the list of the number of competitors participating at the Games per sport.

Sport	Men	Women	Total
Alpine skiing	3	1	4
Biathlon	2	0	2 (Note: Zebastian Modin and his guide Emil Talsi will take part in two sports; biathlon and cross-country skiing.)
Cross-country skiing	3	2	5
Wheelchair curling	3	2	5
Total	9	5	14

== Medallists ==
Medal	Name	Sport	Event	Date
Gold	Ebba Årsjö	Para alpine skiing	Women's downhill, standing	7 March
Gold	Ebba Årsjö	Para alpine skiing	Women's super combined, standing	10 March
Gold	Ebba Årsjö	Para alpine skiing	Women's giant slalom, standing	12 March
Bronze	Ebba Årsjö	Para alpine skiing	Women's super-G, standing	9 March
Bronze	Zebastian Modin; Guide: Emil Talsi	Para cross-country skiing	Men's sprint classical, visually impaired	10 March
Bronze	Zebastian Modin; Guide: Emil Talsi	Para cross-country skiing	Men's 10 kilometre classical, visually impaired	11 March
Bronze	Viljo Petersson-Dahl; Ronny Persson; Sabina Johansson; Kristina Ulander; Marcus Holm	Wheelchair Curling	Mixed team	13 March

Medals by sport
Sport	1st place, gold medalist(s)	2nd place, silver medalist(s)	3rd place, bronze medalist(s)	Total
Alpine skiing	3	0	1	4
Cross-country skiing	0	0	2	2
Wheelchair Curling	0	0	1	1
Total	3	0	4	7

Medals by date
Day	Date	1st place, gold medalist(s)	2nd place, silver medalist(s)	3rd place, bronze medalist(s)	Total
Day 1	7 March	1	0	0	1
Day 2	8 March	0	0	0	0
Day 3	9 March	0	0	1	1
Day 4	10 March	1	0	1	2
Day 5	11 March	0	0	1	1
Day 6	12 March	1	0	0	1
Day 7	13 March	0	0	1	1
Total		3	0	4	7

Medals by gender
Gender	1st place, gold medalist(s)	2nd place, silver medalist(s)	3rd place, bronze medalist(s)	Total
Female	3	0	1	4
Male	0	0	2	2
Mixed	0	0	1	1
Total	3	0	4	7

== Alpine skiing ==
Men and Women

Athlete	Classification	Event	Run 1		Run 2		Total	
Athlete	Classification	Event	Time	Rank	Time	Rank	Time	Rank
Aaron Lindström	Standing	Men's downhill	—N/a				1:19.30	4
Aaron Lindström	Standing	Men's super-G	—N/a				DNF	
Elijah Primak	Sitting	Men's giant slalom	DNF					
Elijah Primak	Sitting	Men's slalom	57.06	16	DNF			
Arvid Skoglund	Standing	Men's super-G	—N/a				DNF	
Arvid Skoglund	Standing	Men's super combined	DNF					
Arvid Skoglund	Standing	Men's giant slalom	1:15.02	22	1:13.04	18	2:28.06	20
Arvid Skoglund	Standing	Men's slalom	51.50	14	49.67	18	1:41.17	16
Ebba Årsjö	Standing	Women's downhill	—N/a				1:22.00	1st place, gold medalist(s)
Ebba Årsjö	Standing	Women's super-G	—N/a				1:17.64	3rd place, bronze medalist(s)
Ebba Årsjö	Standing	Women's super combined	1:15.85	1	44.30	1	2:00.15	1st place, gold medalist(s)
Ebba Årsjö	Standing	Women's giant slalom	1:10.14	1	1:12.28	1	2:22.42	1st place, gold medalist(s)
Ebba Årsjö	Standing	Women's slalom	40.89	1	DNF			

== Biathlon ==
Men

Athlete	Classification	Event	Time	Misses	Rank
Zebastian Modin; Guide: Emil Talsi	Visually impaired	Men's sprint	21:23.7	4 (3+1)	12

== Cross-country skiing ==
Distance

Athlete	Classification	Event	Final	
Athlete	Classification	Event	Time	Rank
Arnt-Christian Furuberg	Sitting	Men's 10 km classical	28:06.9	16
Arnt-Christian Furuberg	Sitting	Men's 20 km free	1:05:23.6	25
Zebastian Modin; Guide: Emil Talsi	Visually impaired	Men's 10 km classical	34:14.4	3rd place, bronze medalist(s)
Alice Morelius	Standing	Women's 10 km classical	39:57.3	8
Alice Morelius	Standing	Women's 20 km free	1:02:34.1	13
Ellen Westerlund	Standing	Women's 10 km classical	38:58.6	5
Ellen Westerlund	Standing	Women's 20 km free	DNS	

Sprint

Athlete	Classification	Event	Qualification		Semifinal		Final	
Athlete	Classification	Event	Time	Rank	Time	Rank	Time	Rank
Arnt-Christian Furuberg	Sitting	Men's sprint	2:21.93	17	Did not advance			
Zebastian Modin; Guide: Emil Talsi	Visually impaired	Men's sprint	2:25.74	2 Q	2:51.1	2 Q	2:50.9	3rd place, bronze medalist(s)
Alice Morelius	Standing	Women's sprint	3:19.99	13	Did not advance			
Ellen Westerlund	Standing	Women's sprint	3:33.15	15	Did not advance			

Relay

Athletes	Event	Time	Rank
Arnt-Christian Furuberg; Arnt-Christian Furuberg; Alice Morelius; Alice Morelius	4 × 2.5 km mixed relay	30:23.2	10

== Wheelchair curling ==
Summary

Team	Event	Group stage										Semifinal	Final / BM	
Team	Event	Opposition Score	Opposition Score	Opposition Score	Opposition Score	Opposition Score	Opposition Score	Opposition Score	Opposition Score	Opposition Score	Rank	Opposition Score	Opposition Score	Rank
Viljo Petersson-Dahl; Ronny Persson; Sabina Johansson; Kristina Ulander; Marcus Holm	Mixed team	NOR; W 6–2	KOR; W 8–6	LAT; W 10–2	USA; L 1–7	GBR; W 6–5	CAN; L 5–6	SVK; W 5–4	ITA; L 3–4	CHN; L 3–12	3 Q	CHN; L 6–7	KOR; W 7–4	3rd place, bronze medalist(s)

=== Mixed tournament ===
Final Round Robin Standings
Team	Skip	Pld	W	L	W–L	PF	PA	EW	EL	BE	SE	S%	DSC	Qualification
Canada	Mark Ideson	9	9	0	–	71	36	36	26	2	19	68.2%	84.488	Playoffs
China	Wang Haitao	9	8	1	–	76	42	38	26	1	15	68.3%	83.350	Playoffs
Sweden	Viljo Petersson-Dahl	9	5	4	1–0	47	48	31	31	6	13	62.8%	98.125	Playoffs
South Korea	Yang Hui-tae	9	5	4	0–1	55	48	36	32	1	17	64.6%	90.525	Playoffs
Norway	Jostein Stordahl	9	4	5	1–0	41	55	28	31	2	12	58.3%	130.863	
Italy	Egidio Marchese	9	4	5	0–1	52	53	32	27	0	15	60.6%	107.831	
Latvia	Ojārs Briedis	9	3	6	2–0	45	67	27	33	0	12	50.2%	113.381	
Slovakia	Radoslav Ďuriš	9	3	6	1–1	42	56	26	37	1	13	51.9%	117.688	
United States	Sean O'Neill	9	3	6	0–2	54	52	34	32	0	14	58.3%	72.156	
Great Britain	Hugh Nibloe	9	1	8	–	40	66	26	39	0	7	55.7%	129.675	

Source: Official website

Round robin
Sweden had a bye in draws 4, 7 and 12.

Draw 1
Saturday, March 7, 9:35

Sheet D	1	2	3	4	5	6	7	8	Final
Norway (Stordahl)	0	0	1	0	1	0	0	X	2
Sweden (Petersson-Dahl) 🔨	1	1	0	3	0	0	1	X	6

Draw 2
Saturday, March 7, 18:35

Sheet C	1	2	3	4	5	6	7	8	EE	Final
Sweden (Petersson-Dahl) 🔨	0	2	0	2	0	1	1	0	2	8
South Korea (Yang)	1	0	3	0	1	0	0	1	0	6

Draw 3
Sunday, March 8, 9:35

Sheet A	1	2	3	4	5	6	7	8	Final
Sweden (Petersson-Dahl)	1	4	3	0	2	0	X	X	10
Latvia (Briedis) 🔨	0	0	0	1	0	1	X	X	2

Draw 5
Monday, March 9, 9:35

Sheet B	1	2	3	4	5	6	7	8	Final
Sweden (Petersson-Dahl)	0	0	0	0	1	0	0	X	1
United States (O'Neill) 🔨	2	1	1	1	0	1	1	X	7

Draw 6
Monday, March 9, 18:35

Sheet C	1	2	3	4	5	6	7	8	Final
Great Britain (Nibloe)	0	2	0	0	0	3	0	0	5
Sweden (Petersson-Dahl) 🔨	1	0	0	1	1	0	2	1	6

Draw 8
Tuesday, March 10, 18:35

Sheet D	1	2	3	4	5	6	7	8	Final
Sweden (Petersson-Dahl)	0	0	0	0	1	1	3	0	5
Canada (Ideson) 🔨	1	1	0	1	0	0	0	3	6

Draw 9
Wednesday, March 11, 9:05

Sheet C	1	2	3	4	5	6	7	8	Final
Sweden (Petersson-Dahl)	1	1	1	1	0	0	1	0	5
Slovakia (Ďuriš) 🔨	0	0	0	0	1	1	0	2	4

Draw 10
Wednesday, March 11, 20:05

Sheet A	1	2	3	4	5	6	7	8	Final
Italy (Marchese)	0	1	1	0	0	1	0	1	4
Sweden (Petersson-Dahl) 🔨	0	0	0	0	3	0	0	0	3

Draw 11
Thursday, March 12, 13:35

Sheet B	1	2	3	4	5	6	7	8	Final
China (Wang)	0	4	0	6	1	0	1	X	12
Sweden (Petersson-Dahl) 🔨	1	0	1	0	0	1	0	X	3

Semifinal

Friday, March 13, 10:05

Sheet D	1	2	3	4	5	6	7	8	Final
China (Wang) 🔨	1	1	0	1	0	3	0	1	7
Sweden (Petersson-Dahl)	0	0	3	0	1	0	2	0	6

Bronze medal game

Friday, March 13, 18:35

Sheet C	1	2	3	4	5	6	7	8	Final
South Korea (Yang)	0	0	2	0	0	0	2	0	4
Sweden (Petersson-Dahl) 🔨	0	1	0	2	0	2	0	2	7

== See also ==
- Sweden at the 2026 Winter Olympics
