= Hailey Griffin =

American para-alpine skier

Personal information
- Born: 11 April 1991 (age 35)
- Home town: Paonia, Colorado, United States
- Education: Virginia Commonwealth University; Colorado State University

Sport
- Country: United States
- Sport: Para-alpine skiing

Hailey Griffin (born 11 April 1991) is an American para-alpine skier. She competed for United States in the women's sitting slalom and giant slalom events at the 2026 Winter Paralympics in Milan–Cortina.

== Early and personal life ==
Hailey Griffin was born on 11 April 1991 and grew up in Paonia, Colorado. She studied at Virginia Commonwealth University and Colorado State University. She was involved in a motor vehicle accident in January 2019, which caused a spinal cord injury that resulted in partial paralysis of her lower body. Griffin identifies as bisexual.

Griffin has worked with various adaptive sports organizations including the Adaptive Sports Center in Crested Butte, the National Ability Center, the High Fives Foundation, and Sisters in Sports. She also participated in the Community Compass initiative in Crested Butte, a project aimed at improving accessibility for people with disabilities. She appeared in the skiing based film Advice for Girls. She also engages in adaptive mountain biking in Crested Butte.

== Career ==
Griffin was introduced to para-alpine skiing by the Adaptive Sports Center in 2020. She made her international debut for the United States at an International Ski and Snowboard Federation (FIS) event in January 2023. She won bronze in the super giant slalom (super-G) at the 2023 U.S. National Championships and silver in the same event at the 2023 Canadian National Championships. She got enrolled into a development programme with the High Performance Alpine Team at the National Ability Center in Park City, Utah.

In January 2024, Griffin secured a first and second-place finish in the super-G event during the 2024 Winter Park Open. She won the sitting giant slalom event at the 2024 FIS para-alpine skiing event held in Park City in February 2024. She secured three podium finishes in the 2024 U.S. and Canada National Championships. In 2025, she recorded several podium finishes in various FIS events.

In early February 2026, Griffin achieved a podium finish in the slalom and giant slalom events in the 2026 U.S. Open National Championships. On 24 February 2026, she was named to the United States team for the women's sitting slalom and giant slalom events at the 2026 Winter Paralympics in Milan–Cortina. At the 2026 Winter Paralympics, Griffin competed in the women's sitting slalom event. She finished ninth out of the 16 competitors in the sitting giant slalom event. She recorded a combined time of 2:58.77 across her two runs, and finished 28.13 seconds behind the winner Anna-Lena Forster of Germany. In the slalom event, she finished 14th out of the 16 competitors with a combined time of two minutes and 1.35 seconds across her two runs.
