= Maya Fügenschuh =

German para-alpine skier and para-cyclist (born 2008)

- Fügenschuh (right) and Corinna Lechner at the 2026 UCI Para Cycling Track World Championships

Personal information
- Nationality: German
- Born: 29 November 2008 (age 17) Bad Hindelang, Germany

Sport
- Country: Germany
- Sport: Para-alpine skiing, para cycling
- Disability class: AS3/B3 (skiing); B (cycling)
- Events: Slalom, giant slalom (skiing); Track (cycling)
Medal record
Representing Germany
Women's para cycling
Track World Championships
Silver medal – second place	2026 Apeldoorn	Mixed team sprint B

Maya Fügenschuh (born 29 November 2008) is a German para-alpine skier and para cyclist. As an alpine skier, she competed at the 2026 Winter Paralympics.

== Career ==
Fügenschuh made her World Cup debut in slalom at St. Moritz in 2025. In 2026, she won both the slalom and giant slalom at a FIS ski race in Matrei, Austria.

Fügenschuh received a wildcard entry, giving her the opportunity to compete at the 2026 Winter Paralympics as the youngest member of her team. At the Paralympics, she competed at the giant slalom and slalom event in the AS3/B3 category, guided by ski cross racer Johanna Holzmann. The two have been training together since August 2025. Holzmann skis in front of Fügenschuh and guides her via a headset built into her helmet, as Fügenschuh has only 5% vision and a limited field of vision. During a downhill run, the two reached speeds of 80 km/h (50 mph). Fügenschuh finished in 9th place in the giant slalom and 10th place in the slalom.

From October to November 2026, Fügenschuh competed at the Track World Championships, where she won a silver medal in the mixed team sprint event.
