= Liana France =

Australian Paralympic skier

Personal information
- Nationality: Australia
- Born: 8 August 2009 (age 16) North Sydney, New South Wales

Sport
- Country: Australia

Liana France (born 8 August 2009) is an Australian para skier. She competed at the 2026 Winter Paralympics. She became the youngest female Australian Winter Paralympian, replacing Melissa Perrine who competed at the 2010 Winter Paralympics.

== Personal ==
She was born on 8 August 2009 in North Sydney, New South Wales. At the age of thirteen, she crushed her hand in a motor vehicle accident, and suffered partial amputation of her left hand, as well as multiple fractures. She had 20 surgeries to save her hand. In 2026, she lives in Beechworth, Victoria and attends Beechworth High School.

== Skiing ==
France plays netball, competes in dragon boating events and started skiing as a two year old and by age of nine was racing. In her early 2025, she was selected to Snow Australia's Emerging Talent Program. She is classified as LW6/8-2 standing skier.

At the 2026 Winter Paralympics, she finished 15th in the Women's Slalom - Standing and 14th in the Women's Giant Slalom - Standing.
