= High Fives Foundation =

US non-profit organization

- Named after: High Fives ski event
- Founder: Roy Tuscany, Executive director
- Type: Non-profit
- Registration no.: 26-4275773
- Legal status: 501(c)(3) Nonprofit Organization
- Headquarters: Truckee, California
- Location: United States
- Region served: Lake Tahoe
- Affiliations: Truckee Chamber of Commerce, Achieve Tahoe, National Ski Area Association, SIA Snow Sports, Squaw Valley Institute, Flyin Ryan Hawks Ambassador, Shane McConkey Foundation
- Budget: $1,130,600 (FY 2015)
- Revenue: $802,000 (FY 2015)
- Staff: 7 (2015)
- Website: highfivesfoundation.org

High Fives Foundation is a Lake Tahoe–based, national 501(c)(3) non-profit organization. Located in Truckee, California, the foundation provides grants for rehabilitation support to athletes with life-altering injuries as a result of mountain sports. It also promotes awareness of injury prevention. Athletes such as Nick Fairall and Julia Mancuso are involved with the foundation.

== History ==
High Fives Foundation was founded in 2009 by Roy Tuscany. Tuscany suffered a spinal cord injury resulting in immediate lower body paralysis while skiing in 2006. In 2008, Tuscany hosted his first event called High Fives, which was a skiing contest for the best 540 rotation at the Sugar Bowl Resort. The event-based fundraising format became the primary revenue source. In August 2016, High Fives Foundation announced the Stowe Country Club in Vermont as the host for its second annual charity golf tournament.

=== Programs and initiatives ===
The foundation's Empowerment Fund provides grants to disabled winter action sports athletes and athletes recovering from life-altering injuries. The foundation expanded its mission to help people injured in summer mountain sports.

In 2011, the High Fives Foundation along with action sports professional J.T. Holmes created the BASICS Program Services (Being Aware Safe In Critical Situations). The program has produced five safety education documentaries, which are shown in schools, ski clubs, and to industry professionals around the country. Decorated freeskier Daron Rahlves is a program mentor.

The CR Johnson Healing Center is a 2,400 square foot training facility in Truckee, California, that provides resources for athletes in the process of rehabilitation such as physical therapy, acupuncture, active release techniques, and personal training.

High Fives Foundation created the Military to the Mountains program which enables United States military veterans injured during tour of duty to ski in Squaw Valley. In 2016, the foundation helped its 100th athlete with the Military to the Mountains program. In May 2016, High Fives Foundation received a $150,000 donation from Squaw Valley Alpine Meadows for its Military to the Mountains program.

== Filmography ==
Year	Title
2016	Fives Fish: Adaptive Fishing Trip
2016	QUADRILYZED: The Journey of Jason Abraham
2015	Full Circle Project
2015	Beyond the Veil: The High Fives Foundation
2015	Lyndsay Slocumb Interview High Fives Foundation
2015	Marines to the Mountains
2015	Lottery of Life, The Jocelyn Judd Story
2014	The Edge of Impossible
