= Landon Uthke =

American sledge hockey player (born 2007)

Personal information
- Born: December 30, 2007 (age 18) Albert Lea, Minnesota, U.S.

Sport
- Country: United States
- Sport: Ice sled hockey
- Position: Defense
Medal record
Para ice hockey
Representing United States
Paralympic Games
Gold medal – first place	2026 Milano Cortina	Team competition

Landon Uthke (born December 30, 2007) is an American ice sled hockey player. He was a member of the United States national team that won a gold medal at the 2026 Winter Paralympics.

== Early life ==
Uthke was born and raised in Albert Lea, Minnesota and began playing sled hockey when he was young, after having his legs amputated due to injuries from a lawnmower accident.

== Career ==
Uthke made his first United States national team roster in 2025 at 16 years old, and made his international debut at the 2025 International Para Hockey Cup, which his team had won. He was also part of the U.S. national team that won the 2025 Para Hockey Cup.

On January 16, 2026, Uthke was named to Team USA's roster for the 2026 Winter Paralympics, becoming the youngest player on the roster. His team won a gold medal, which was the United States' third consecutive gold medal in Para ice hockey at the Winter Paralympics.
