= Neil Simpson (alpine skier) =

British Para alpine skier (born 2002)

Neil Simpson MBE
Personal information
- Full name: Neil Douglas Hamilton Simpson
- Born: 8 December 2002 (age 23) Banchory, Aberdeenshire, Scotland

Sport
- Country: Great Britain
- Sport: Para alpine skiing
- Disability: Visually impaired
- Disability class: B3
Medal record
Men's Para alpine skiing
Representing Great Britain
Paralympic Games
Gold medal – first place	2022 Beijing	Super-G
Silver medal – second place	2026 Milano Cortina	Super combined
Bronze medal – third place	2022 Beijing	Super combined
World Championships
Gold medal – first place	2023 Lleida	Super-G
Silver medal – second place	2021 Lillehammer	Super combined
Silver medal – second place	2023 Lleida	Slalom
Bronze medal – third place	2023 Lleida	Giant slalom

Neil Douglas Hamilton Simpson MBE (born 8 December 2002) is a British visually impaired Para alpine skier who competed at the 2022 and 2026 Winter Paralympic Games.

== Career ==
Simpson made his debut at the 2021 World Para Snow Sports Championships where he won a silver medal in the super combined.

He competed at the 2022 Winter Paralympics and won a gold medal in the super-G and a bronze medal in the super combined.

Simpson was appointed Member of the Order of the British Empire (MBE) in the 2022 Birthday Honours for services to skiing.

At the 2026 Winter Paralympics, Simpson and his guide Rob Poth won a silver medal in the alpine combined. During the Paralympics, he also recorded fourth-place finishes in the downhill and super-G. In the giant slalom, Simpson and Roth exited the competition after missing a gate in their opening run.
