= Aaron Lindström =

Swedish para-alpine skier (born 2000)

Aaron Lindström (born 20 July 2000) is a Swedish male para-alpine skier. He is from Skövde and was born without a hand. He has been skiing since he was two years old. He competed at the slalom, giant slalom and super-G events at the 2018 Winter Paralympics. At the 2022 Winter Paralympics, he finished sixth in downhill. He also won male athlete of the year at the Parasportsgalan. He crashed at the 2026 Winter Paralympics – Men's super-G and was hospitalised.
