= France at the 2026 Winter Paralympics =

- IPC code: FRA

in Milan and Cortina d'Ampezzo, Italy 4 March 2026 – 15 March 2026
- Flag bearers: Jordan Broisin and Cécile Hernandez
- Medals Ranked 6th: Gold 4 Silver 4 Bronze 4 Total 12

Winter Paralympics appearances (overview)
- 1976; 1980; 1984; 1988; 1992; 1994; 1998; 2002; 2006; 2010; 2014; 2018; 2022; 2026

France is scheduled to compete at the 2026 Winter Paralympics in Milan and Cortina d'Ampezzo, Italy, from 6 to 15 March 2026. It will be the fourteenth consecutive appearance at the Winter Paralympic Games for this country since the event in 1976.

== Medalists ==
Medal	Name	Sport	Event	Date
Gold	Cécile Hernandez	Para snowboard	Women's snowboard cross, SB-LL2	8 March
Gold	Arthur Bauchet	Para alpine skiing	Men's super combined, standing	10 March
Gold	Karl Tabouret	Para cross-country skiing	Men's 10 kilometre classical, standing	11 March
Gold	Arthur Bauchet	Para alpine skiing	Men's giant slalom, standing	13 March
Silver	Aurélie Richard	Para alpine skiing	Women's downhill, standing	7 March
Silver	Arthur Bauchet	Para alpine skiing	Men's downhill, standing	7 March
Silver	Aurélie Richard	Para alpine skiing	Women's super-G, standing	9 March
Silver	Aurélie Richard	Para alpine skiing	Women's super combined, standing	10 March
Bronze	Jules Segers	Para alpine skiing	Men's super-G, standing	9 March
Bronze	Benjamin Daviet	Para cross-country skiing	Men's sprint classical, standing	10 March
Bronze	Aurélie Richard	Para alpine skiing	Women's giant slalom, standing	12 March
Bronze	Anthony Chalençon; Guide: Florian Michelon	Para cross-country skiing	Men's 20 kilometre freestyle, visually impaired	15 March

Medals by sport
Sport	1st place, gold medalist(s)	2nd place, silver medalist(s)	3rd place, bronze medalist(s)	Total
Para alpine skiing	2	4	2	8
Para snowboard	1	0	0	1
Para cross-country skiing	1	0	2	3
Total	4	4	4	12

Medals by date
Day	Date	1st place, gold medalist(s)	2nd place, silver medalist(s)	3rd place, bronze medalist(s)	Total
1	7 March	0	2	0	2
2	8 March	1	0	0	1
3	9 March	0	1	1	2
4	10 March	1	1	1	3
5	11 March	1	0	0	1
6	12 March	0	0	1	1
7	13 March	1	0	0	1
8	14 March	0	0	0	0
9	15 March	0	0	1	1
Total		4	4	4	12

Medals by gender
Gender	1st place, gold medalist(s)	2nd place, silver medalist(s)	3rd place, bronze medalist(s)	Total
Female	1	3	1	5
Male	3	1	3	7
Mixed	0	0	0	0
Total	4	4	4	12

== Competitors ==
The following is the list of number of competitors participating at the Games per sport/discipline.

Sport	Men	Women	Total
Para alpine skiing	10	4	14
Para snowboard	1	1	2
Total	11	5	16
