= Elina Stary =

Austrian Para alpine skier (born 2006)

Personal information
- Born: 19 December 2006 (age 19)
- Home town: St. Georgen am Längsee, Austria

Sport
- Country: Austria
- Sport: Para alpine skiing
- Disability: Visually impaired
- Disability class: AS2
Medal record
Women's Para alpine skiing
Representing Austria
Paralympic Games
Silver medal – second place	2026 Milano Cortina	Slalom
Bronze medal – third place	2026 Milano Cortina	Super combined
Bronze medal – third place	2026 Milano Cortina	Giant slalom
World Championships
Silver medal – second place	2021 Lillehammer	Slalom
Bronze medal – third place	2021 Lillehammer	Giant slalom
Bronze medal – third place	2021 Lillehammer	Parallel event
Bronze medal – third place	2025 Maribor	Giant slalom

Elina Stary (born 19 December 2006) is an Austrian visually impaired Para alpine skier.

== Career ==
Stary made her debut at the 2021 World Para Snow Sports Championships held in Lillehammer, Norway where she won the silver medal in the slalom event and the bronze medal in the giant slalom and parallel events. She competed at the 2022 Winter Paralympics held in Beijing, China, having been the youngest competitor in the games.
