= Thomas Grochar =

Austrian Para alpine skier (born 1993)

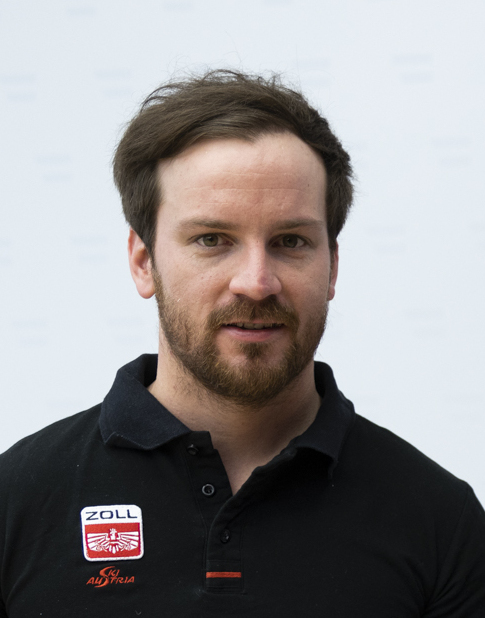
- Grochar in 2022

Personal information
- Born: 23 November 1993 (age 32)

Sport
- Country: Austria
- Sport: Para alpine skiing
- Disability class: LW2
Medal record
Men's Para alpine skiing
Representing Austria
Paralympic Games
Bronze medal – third place	2026 Milano Cortina	Super combined standing

Thomas Grochar (born 23 November 1993) is an Austrian Para alpine skier. He is a four-time Paralympian.

== Career ==
In February 2026, he was selected to represent Austria at the 2026 Winter Paralympics. He won a bronze medal in the super combined standing event with a time of 1:59.99.
