= Meg Gustafson =

American para alpine skier (born 2009)

Personal information
- Born: April 22, 2009 (age 17) Edina, Minnesota, U.S.

Sport
- Country: United States
- Sport: Alpine skiing
- Disability class: B2

Margaret "Meg" Gustafson (born April 22, 2009) is an American visually impaired para alpine skier.

== Early life ==
Born in Edina, Minnesota with an eye condition that affects its ligaments. She stated she can solely see from her right eye. Her father Peder, who competed as an alpine skier in Boston College, introduced Gustafson and her siblings to skiing. Among them includes her brother Spencer, who acts as her guide. The Gustafsons had frequently visited Colorado and moved there permanently during the COVID-19 pandemic, settling in Edwards, Colorado.

== Career ==
Gustafson made her competitive debut at the U16 Rocky Mountain Championships held in Vail, Colorado, where she competed in the downhill, giant slalom and slalom events. During the 2025–26 World Cup season, she has finished as low as fourth in every race she competed in leading up to the 2026 Winter Paralympics, including seven consecutive wins in giant slalom, slalom and super G races.

On February 24, 2026, Gustafson was named to Team USA's roster for the 2026 Winter Paralympics, having qualified for all five events. She finished in sixth place in the downhill and fifth place in the giant slalom.
