= Liang Zilu =

Chinese para alpine skier (born 2004)

Personal information
- Born: 6 October 2004 (age 21)

Sport
- Country: China
- Sport: Alpine skiing
Medal record
Men's para alpine skiing
Representing China
Paralympic Games
Bronze medal – third place	2022 Beijing	Giant slalom sitting

Liang Zilu (born 6 October 2004) is a Chinese para alpine skier. He represented China at the 2022 and 2026 Winter Paralympics.

== Career ==
Liang competed at the 2022 Winter Paralympics and won a bronze medal in the giant slalom sitting event.
