= Patrick Halgren =

American Para alpine skier (born 1992)

Personal information
- Born: June 24, 1992 (age 34)
- Home town: Tolland, Connecticut, U.S.
- Height: 5 ft 10 in (178 cm)

Sport
- Country: United States
- Sport: Para alpine skiing
- Disability class: LW2
Medal record
Men's Para alpine skiing
Representing United States
Paralympic Games
Silver medal – second place	2026 Milano Cortina	Super-G standing

Patrick Halgren (born June 24, 1992) is an American Para alpine skier.

== Career ==
Halgren represented the United States at the 2022 and 2026 Winter Paralympics. He won a silver medal in the men's super-G event at the 2026 Winter Paralympics.

== Personal life ==
Halgren had his left leg amputated above the knee after a motorcycle crash in 2013. His twin brother, Sven, died in a motorcycle crash in New Zealand in 2016.
