= Claire Petit =

Dutch para-alpine skier (born 2004)

Personal information
- Born: 25 February 2004 (age 22) Capelle aan den IJssel, Netherlands

Sport
- Country: Netherlands
- Sport: Para-alpine skiing
- Disability class: LW2

Achievements and titles
- Paralympic finals: Milan/Cortina 2026

Claire Petit (born 25 February 2004) is a Dutch para-alpine skier. She represented the Netherlands at the 2026 Winter Paralympics.

== Early life ==
Petit was born without her right upper leg. At the age of four, she began skiing with two legs by using a prosthesis. Inspired by para-skier Anna Jochemsen, she decided to start skiing on one leg. At the age of fifteen, she moved to the National Sports Centre Papendal in Arnhem.

== Career ==
Petit made her debut for the Dutch national team in 2019. She missed participating at the 2022 Winter Paralympics in Beijing, China, after breaking her collarbone.

In 2025, Petit qualified for the 2026 Winter Paralympics in Milan and Cortina d'Ampezzo. She served as the flag bearer for the Netherlands during the 2026 Winter Paralympics Parade of Nations. She competed in the downhill, Super-G, super combined, giant slalom and slalom events. In her Paralympic debut in the downhill she finished in seventh place.

== Results ==
=== Paralympic Games ===
Year	Venue	Results
2026	Italy Cortina d'Ampezzo	6th Super-G; 7th Downhill; 10th Super combined

=== World Championships ===
Year	Venue	Results
2022	Norway Lillehammer	7th Super-G; 7th Downhill
2025	Slovenia Maribor	7th Giant slalom 8th Slalom
