= Audrey Crowley =

American para-alpine skier (born 2007)

Personal information
- Born: March 1, 2007 (age 19)
- Home town: Eagle, Colorado, U.S.

Sport
- Country: United States
- Sport: Para-alpine skiing
- Disability class: LW6/8
Medal record
Women's para-alpine skiing
Representing the United States
World Championships
| Bronze medal – third place | 2025 Maribor | Giant slalom standing |

Audrey Crowley (born March 1, 2007) is an American para-alpine skier.

== Career ==
In January 2025, competed at the 2025 World Para Alpine Skiing Championships and won a bronze medal in the giant slalom standing event. In February 2026, she was selected to represent the United States at the 2026 Winter Paralympics.

== Personal life ==
Crowley was born without her lower-right arm. Crowley is the daughter of Steve Crowley and Susie Crowley.
