= Anna Soens =

American para-alpine skier (born 1988)

Personal information
- Nationality: American
- Born: July 28, 1988 (age 38) South Korea

Sport
- Sport: Para-alpine skiing
- Disability class: LW12
- Events: Downhill, Super-G, Alpine combined, Giant slalom, Slalom

Achievements and titles
- Paralympic finals: Milan/Cortina 2026

Anna Soens (born 28 July 1988) is a South Korean-born American para-alpine skier. She represented the United States at the 2026 Winter Paralympics.

== Early life ==
Soens was born on 28 July 1988 in Korea and later moved to the United States. She competes for the United States in para-alpine skiing in the LW12-1 sitting classification.

Before becoming a para-alpine skier, Soens was an avid rock climber and outdoors enthusiast. In 2015 she suffered a fall at an indoor climbing gym in Oregon which caused an incomplete spinal cord injury that left her paralysed below the hips.

Following the accident, Soens took up adaptive skiing and began competing in para-alpine events. She later described skiing as filling the void left by climbing and allowing her to continue challenging herself athletically.

== Career ==
In 2018 she became the first paraplegic woman to summit Mount Hood, accomplishing the climb with support from friends and family including her father.

Soens qualified for the United States team at the 2026 Winter Paralympics in Milan–Cortina, marking her Paralympic debut. She qualified for five alpine skiing events: downhill, super-G, alpine combined, giant slalom and slalom.

During the Games she competed in the women's downhill sitting event but crashed during her run and did not finish. She later recorded a fourth-place finish in the Super-G sitting race.

Outside of sport, Soens works as a wildlife biologist and balances her training and competitions with a full-time career.

== Results ==
=== Paralympic Games ===
Year	Venue	Sport	Results
2026	Italy Cortina d'Ampezzo	Alpine skiing	4th Super-G Sitting; DNF Downhill Sitting
