= Kelsey O'Driscoll =

American para-alpine skier (born 1988)

Personal information
- Nationality: American
- Born: January 24, 1994 (age 32) New Jersey, United States

Sport
- Sport: Para-alpine skiing
- Disability class: LW1
- Events: Downhill, Super-G, Alpine combined, Giant slalom, Slalom

Achievements and titles
- Paralympic finals: Milan/Cortina 2026

Kelsey O'Driscoll (born January 24, 1994) is an American para-alpine skier. She represented the United States at the 2026 Winter Paralympics.

== Career ==
O'Driscoll began skiing at age two and surfing at age seven. As a child and teenager, she competed in track and field and dreamed of going to the Olympics, inspired by watching the 2002 Winter Games.

In March 2021, O'Driscoll suffered a broken spine in a sledding accident. She spent months in rehabilitation and gradually regained mobility, eventually returning to skiing using adaptive techniques such as outriggers.

O'Driscoll works as a nurse in Albany and as a ski patroller at Gore Mountain. Despite her severe asthma and previous injuries, she continued training and joined the U.S. Paralympic Alpine Ski Team in 2024. She competes in five alpine skiing events: slalom, giant slalom, super-G, downhill, and alpine combined.

O'Driscoll emphasized resilience and joy in sport, aiming to enjoy the Games regardless of medal outcomes. She competed in the 2026 Winter Paralympics in Milan–Cortina across the standing alpine skiing events.
