= Saylor O'Brien =

American para-alpine skier (born 2003)

Personal information
- Born: April 28, 2003 (age 23) San Francisco, CA
- Home town: Woodland, Utah, U.S.

Sport
- Country: United States
- Sport: Para-alpine skiing
- Disability: Spina bifida
- Disability class: LW12-1
Medal record
Women's para-alpine skiing
Representing the United States
World Championships
| Bronze medal – third place | 2023 Lleida | Alpine combined sitting |
| Bronze medal – third place | 2023 Lleida | Super-G sitting |

Saylor O'Brien (born April 28, 2003) is an American para-alpine skier. She will represent the United States at the 2026 Winter Paralympics.

== Career ==
O'Brien competed at the 2023 World Para Alpine Skiing Championships and won bronze medals in the alpine combined and Super-G sitting events. During the 2024–25 FIS Para Alpine Ski World Cup she had four podiums, including her first career victory and was named U.S. Para Alpine Ski Athlete of the Year.

In February 2026, she was selected to represent the United States at the 2026 Winter Paralympics.

== Personal life ==
When asked about her name, O'Brien says she was born in San Francisco. The hospital room overlooked the bridge and the bay and the sailboats coasting by, giving her mother the inspriation for her name -- but with a different spelling.

O'Brien was born with Spina bifida.
