= List of 2026 Winter Paralympics medal winners =

The 2026 Winter Paralympics, officially the XIV Paralympic Winter Games, or the 14th Winter Paralympics, were held from 6 to 15 March 2026 in Lombardy and Northeast Italy. There were 79 events in six winter sports.

== Alpine skiing ==
=== Women's events ===
Event	Class	Gold		Silver		Bronze	
Downhill	visually impaired	Veronika Aigner; Guide: Lilly Sammer; Austria	1:22.55	Chiara Mazzel; Guide: Nicola Cotti Cottini; Italy	1:23.03	Alexandra Rexová; Guide: Sophia Polák; Slovakia	1:27.45
Downhill	sitting	Anna-Lena Forster; Germany	1:25.79	Audrey Pascual; Spain	1:25.84	Liu Sitong; China	1:31.27
Downhill	standing	Ebba Årsjö; Sweden	1:22.00	Aurélie Richard; France	1:23.71	Varvara Voronchikhina; Russia	1:24.47
Super-G	visually impaired	Chiara Mazzel; Guide: Nicola Cotti Cottini; Italy	1:14.84	Veronika Aigner; Guide: Lilly Sammer; Austria	1:15.44	Alexandra Rexová; Guide: Sophia Polák; Slovakia	1:19.69
Super-G	sitting	Audrey Pascual; Spain	1:17.82	Momoka Muraoka; Japan	1:24.14	Liu Sitong; China	1:24.91
Super-G	standing	Varvara Voronchikhina; Russia	1:15.60	Aurélie Richard; France	1:17.56	Ebba Årsjö; Sweden	1:17.64
Giant slalom	visually impaired	Veronika Aigner; Guide: Eric Digruber; Austria	2:18.63	Chiara Mazzel; Guide: Nicola Cotti Cottini; Italy	2:21.19	Elina Stary; Guide: Stefan Winter; Austria	2:25.30
Giant slalom	sitting	Anna-Lena Forster; Germany	2:30.64	Momoka Muraoka; Japan	2:31.92	Liu Sitong; China	2:34.79
Giant slalom	standing	Ebba Årsjö; Sweden	2:22.42	Varvara Voronchikhina; Russia	2:25.26	Aurélie Richard; France	2:27.04
Slalom	visually impaired	Veronika Aigner; Guide: Lilly Sammer; Austria	1:22.73	Elina Stary; Guide: Stefan Winter; Austria	1:26.77	Alexandra Rexová; Guide: Sophia Polak; Slovakia	1:31.97
Slalom	sitting	Zhang Wenjing; China	1:27.69	Nette Kiviranta; Finland	1:27.96	Audrey Pascual; Spain	1:28.04
Slalom	standing	Varvara Voronchikhina; Russia	1:26.95	Zhu Wenjing; China	1:28.44	Michaela Gosselin; Canada	1:29.19
Super combined	visually impaired	Veronika Aigner; Guide: Lilly Sammer; Austria	2:01.75	Chiara Mazzel; Guide: Nicola Cotti Cottini; Italy	2:04.81	Elina Stary; Guide: Stefan Winter; Austria	2:05.65
Super combined	sitting	Audrey Pascual; Spain	2:11.22	Anna-Lena Forster; Germany	2:11.68	Liu Sitong; China	2:14.53
Super combined	standing	Ebba Årsjö; Sweden	2:00.15	Aurélie Richard; France	2:07.18	Zhu Wenjing; China	2:10.69

=== Men's events ===
Event	Class	Gold		Silver		Bronze	
Downhill	visually impaired	Johannes Aigner; Guide: Nico Haberl; Austria	1:16.08	Kalle Ericsson; Guide: Sierra Smith; Canada	1:18.33	Giacomo Bertagnolli; Guide: Andrea Ravelli; Italy	1:18.64
Downhill	sitting	Jesper Pedersen; Norway	1:18.14	Niels de Langen; Netherlands	1:19.24	Kurt Oatway; Canada	1:19.42
Downhill	standing	Robin Cuche; Switzerland	1:17.79	Arthur Bauchet; France	1:18.40	Alexey Bugaev; Russia	1:18.94
Super-G	visually impaired	Johannes Aigner; Guide: Nico Haberl; Austria	1:11.99	Giacomo Bertagnolli; Guide: Andrea Ravelli; Italy	1:12.15	Kalle Ericsson; Guide: Sierra Smith; Canada	1:13.29
Super-G	sitting	Jeroen Kampschreur; Netherlands	1:13.08	Jesper Pedersen; Norway	1:13.80	Andrew Kurka; United States	1:13.95
Super-G	standing	Robin Cuche; Switzerland	1:12.12	Patrick Halgren; United States	1:13.10	Jules Segers; France	1:13.59
Giant slalom	visually impaired	Johannes Aigner; Guide: Nico Haberl; Austria	2:07.83	Giacomo Bertagnolli; Guide: Andrea Ravelli; Italy	2:08.17	Michał Gołaś; Guide: Kacper Walas; Poland	2:09.91
Giant slalom	sitting	René De Silvestro; Italy	2:10.44	Niels de Langen; Netherlands	2:11.01	Jesper Pedersen; Norway	2:14.59
Giant slalom	standing	Arthur Bauchet; France	2:07.76	Robin Cuche; Switzerland	2:09.72	Alexey Bugaev; Russia	2:11.14
Slalom	visually impaired	Giacomo Bertagnolli; Guide: Andrea Ravelli; Italy	1:29.29	Michał Gołaś; Guide: Kacper Walas; Poland	1:29.56	Kalle Ericsson; Guide: Sierra Smith; Canada	1:31.26
Slalom	sitting	Jeroen Kampschreur; Netherlands	1:29.72	Jesper Pedersen; Norway	1:31.11	Takeshi Suzuki; Japan	1:31.30
Slalom	standing	Alexey Bugaev; Russia	1:28.55	Adam Hall; New Zealand	1:31.38	Robin Cuche; Switzerland	1:31.73
Super combined	visually impaired	Giacomo Bertagnolli; Guide: Andrea Ravelli; Italy	1:56.42	Neil Simpson; Guide: Rob Poth; Great Britain	1:57.07	Johannes Aigner; Guide: Nico Haberl; Austria	1:57.46
Super combined	sitting	Jeroen Kampschreur; Netherlands	1:56.33	René De Silvestro; Italy	1:56.44	Niels de Langen; Netherlands	1:57.59
Super combined	standing	Arthur Bauchet; France	1:58.17	Federico Pelizzari; Italy	1:59.37	Thomas Grochar; Austria	1:59.99

== Biathlon ==
=== Women's events ===
Event	Class	Gold		Silver		Bronze	
Individual	visually impaired	Wang Yue; Guide: Chen Guoming; China	35:04.7	Simona Bubeníčková; Guide: David Šrůtek; Czech Republic	36:43.9	Johanna Recktenwald; Guide: Emily Rose Weiss; Germany	37:05.2
Individual	sitting	Kim Yun-ji; South Korea	38:00.1	Anja Wicker; Germany	38:12.9	Kendall Gretsch; United States	38:36.1
Individual	standing	Natalie Wilkie; Canada	33:01.8	Zhao Zhiqing; China	33:33.5	Oleksandra Kononova; Ukraine	33:37.9
Sprint	visually impaired	Wang Yue; Guide: Chen Guoming; China	19:52.5	Carina Edlingerová; Guide: Alexandr Paťava; Czech Republic	20:20.5	Leonie Walter; Guide: Christian Krasman; Germany	20:32.2
Sprint	sitting	Oksana Masters; United States	21:21.3	Kendall Gretsch; United States	21:37.3	Anja Wicker; Germany	22:32.4
Sprint	standing	Oleksandra Kononova; Ukraine	18:41.5	Natalie Wilkie; Canada	18:46.4	Liudmyla Liashenko; Ukraine	19:13.9
Sprint pursuit	visually impaired	Carina Edlingerová; Guide: Alexandr Paťava; Czech Republic	13:38.1	Wang Yue; Guide: Chen Guoming; China	13:48.0	Simona Bubeníčková; Guide: David Šrůtek; Czech Republic Leonie Walter; Guide: Christian Krasman; Germany	13:59.2
Sprint pursuit	sitting	Kendall Gretsch; United States	11:33.1	Kim Yun-ji; South Korea	11:41.6	Anja Wicker; Germany	12:39.1
Sprint pursuit	standing	Natalie Wilkie; Canada	12:18.0	Iryna Bui; Ukraine	12:35.7	Oleksandra Kononova; Ukraine	12:49.0

=== Men's events ===
Event	Class	Gold		Silver		Bronze	
Individual	visually impaired	Dang Hesong; Guide: Lu Hongda; China	31:31.9	Maksym Murashkovskyi; Guide: Vitaliy Trush; Ukraine	33:41.1	Dmytro Suiarko; Guide: Oleksandr Nikonovych; Ukraine	33:51.1
Individual	sitting	Liu Zixu; China	34:38.1	Mao Zhongwu; China	35:06.5	Taras Rad; Ukraine	35:57.1
Individual	standing	Cai Jiayun; China	30:24.1	Mark Arendz; Canada	30:52.5	Marco Maier; Germany	31:07.3
Sprint	visually impaired	Oleksandr Kazik; Guide: Serhii Kucheriavyi; Ukraine	17:37.7	Iaroslav Reshetynskyi; Guide: Dmytro Drahun; Ukraine	18:40.1	Anatolii Kovalevskyi; Guide: Oleksandr Mukshyn; Ukraine	18:43.8
Sprint	sitting	Taras Rad; Ukraine	19:55.5	Liu Mengtao; China	20:04.8	Liu Zixu; China	20:13.1
Sprint	standing	Cai Jiayun; China	17:13.6	Liu Xiaobin; China	17:35.4	Marco Maier; Germany	17:42.4
Sprint pursuit	visually impaired	Yu Shuang; Guide:Shang Jincai; China	11:39.2	Oleksandr Kazik; Guide: Serhii Kucheriavyi; Ukraine	11:53.0	Anatolii Kovalevskyi; Guide: Oleksandr Mukshyn; Ukraine	12:13.7
Sprint pursuit	sitting	Yerbol Khamitov; Kazakhstan	9:39.0	Taras Rad; Ukraine	10:00.5	Liu Zixu; China	10:11.5
Sprint pursuit	standing	Cai Jiayun; China	10:33.4	Grygorii Vovchynskyi; Ukraine	10:33.6	Marco Maier; Germany	11:08.5

== Cross-country skiing ==
=== Women's events ===
Event	Class	Gold		Silver		Bronze	
Sprint classical	visually impaired	Anastasiia Bagiian; Guide: Sergei Siniakin; Russia	3:16.1	Linn Kazmaier; Guide: Florian Baumann; Germany	3:25.3	Cong Jihong; Guide: Liu Jiaxuan; China	3:30.2
Sprint classical	sitting	Oksana Masters; United States	3:07.1	Kim Yun-ji; South Korea	3:10.1	Wang Shiyu; China	3:17.9
Sprint classical	standing	Vilde Nilsen; Norway	3:31.3	Sydney Peterson; United States	3:35.5	Natalie Wilkie; Canada	3:40.2
10 kilometres classical	visually impaired	Anastasiia Bagiian; Guide: Sergei Siniakin; Russia	29:39.7	Simona Bubeníčková; Guide: David Šrůtek; Czech Republic	31:59.1	Leonie Walter; Guide: Christian Krasman; Germany	35:30.8
10 kilometres classical	sitting	Oksana Masters; United States	26:31.6	Kim Yun-ji; South Korea	26:51.6	Kendall Gretsch; United States	27:27.6
10 kilometres classical	standing	Sydney Peterson; United States	29:49.2	Vilde Nilsen; Norway	29:51.8	Brittany Hudak; Canada	32:01.0
20 kilometres freestyle	visually impaired	Anastasiia Bagiian; Guide: Sergei Siniakin; Russia	43:59.1	Simona Bubeníčková; Guide: David Šrůtek; Czech Republic	47:27.2	Wang Yue; Guide: Chen Guoming; China	48:58.7
20 kilometres freestyle	sitting	Kim Yun-ji; South Korea	58:23.3	Anja Wicker; Germany	59:17.4	Oksana Masters; United States	59:34.5
20 kilometres freestyle	standing	Sydney Peterson; United States	47:25.8	Vilde Nilsen; Norway	48:39.7	Oleksandra Kononova; Ukraine	48:43.4

=== Men's events ===
Event	Class	Gold		Silver		Bronze	
Sprint classical	visually impaired	Jake Adicoff; Guide: Peter Wolter; United States	2:44.7	Yu Shuang; Guide: Shang Jincai; China	2:46.2	Zebastian Modin; Guide: Emil Talsi; Sweden	2:50.9
Sprint classical	sitting	Liu Zixu; China	2:28.9	Cristian Ribera; Brazil	2:29.6	Yerbol Khamitov; Kazakhstan	2:29.9
Sprint classical	standing	Raman Svirydzenka; Belarus	2:35.4	Sebastian Marburger; Germany	2:38.1	Benjamin Daviet; France	2:42.2
10 kilometres classical	visually impaired	Jake Adicoff; Guide: Reid Goble; United States	28:03.6	Inkki Inola; Guide: Reetu Inkilä; Finland	29:52.3	Zebastian Modin; Guide: Emil Talsi; Sweden	30:07.9
10 kilometres classical	sitting	Ivan Golubkov; Russia	24:05.8	Mao Zhongwu; China	24:22.1	Zheng Peng; China	24:24.5
10 kilometres classical	standing	Karl Tabouret; France	27:10.7	Raman Svirydzenka; Belarus	27:38.4	Mark Arendz; Canada	27:59.3
20 kilometres freestyle	visually impaired	Jake Adicoff; Guide: Peter Wolter; United States	42:17.4	Oleksandr Kazik; Guide: Serhii Kucheriavyi; Ukraine	42:24.6	Anthony Chalençon; Guide: Florian Michelon; France	43:21.9
20 kilometres freestyle	sitting	Ivan Golubkov; Russia	51:55.0	Mao Zhongwu; China	52:45.8	Giuseppe Romele; Italy	53:17.1
20 kilometres freestyle	standing	Wang Chenyang; China	41:15.2	Huang Lingxin; China	42:28.4	Liu Xiaobin; China	43:01.9

=== Mixed events ===
Event	Gold		Silver		Bronze	
Mixed 4 × 2.5 kilometre relay	United States; Joshua Sweeney; Oksana Masters; Sydney Peterson; Jake Adicoff; Guide: Reid Goble	23:24.2	Ukraine; Pavlo Bal; Taras Rad; Oleksandra Kononova; Liudmyla Liashenko	23:36.7	China; Mao Zhongwu; Zheng Peng; Huang Lingxin; Wang Yue; Guide: Chen Guoming	23:56.5
Open 4 × 2.5 kilometre relay	China; Wang Tao; Wang Chenyang; Dang Hesong; Guide: Lu Hongda; Yu Shuang; Guide: Shang Jincai	21:54.4	Germany; Sebastian Marburger; Marco Maier; Theo Bold; Guide: Jakob Bold; Linn Kazmaier; Guide: Florian Baumann	21:59.8	Norway; Kjartan Haugen; Vilde Nilsen; Thomas Oxaal; Guide: Geir Lervik	22:28.6

== Para ice hockey ==
Event	Gold	Silver	Bronze
Open tournament	United States; Kayden Beasley; Brett Bolton; Liam Cunningham; Travis Dodson; David Eustace; Declan Farmer; Noah Grove; Malik Jones; Griffin LaMarre; Jen Lee; Kevin McKee; Josh Misiewicz; Evan Nichols; Josh Pauls; Brody Roybal; Landon Uthke; Jack Wallace	Canada; Rob Armstrong; Vincent Boily; Shawn Burnett; Dominic Cozzolino; Adam Dixon; James Dunn; Auren Halbert; Tyrone Henry; Liam Hickey; Anton Jacobs-Webb; Adam Kingsmill; Micah Kovacevich; Zach Lavin; Mathieu Lelièvre; Tyler McGregor; Corbin Watson; Greg Westlake	China; Che Hang; Chen Hongyu; Cui Yutao; He Haoran; Ji Yanzhao; Li Hongguan; Liu Wenxu; Lyu Zhi; Qiu Dianpeng; Shen Yifeng; Song Xiaodong; Tian Jintao; Wang Jujiang; Wang Wei; Wang Zhidong; Zhang Zheng; Zhu Zhanfu

== Snowboarding ==
=== Women's events ===
Event	Class	Gold		Silver		Bronze	
Banked slalom	SB-LL2	Kate Delson; United States	1:02.99	Lisa Bunschoten; Netherlands	1:03.53	Brenna Huckaby; United States	1:03.98
Snowboard cross	SB-LL2	Cécile Hernandez; France		Kate Delson; United States		Wang Xinyu; China	

=== Men's events ===
Event	Class	Gold		Silver		Bronze	
Banked slalom	SB-LL1	Noah Elliott; United States	58.94	Daichi Oguri; Japan	59.02	Mike Schultz; United States	1:00.05
Banked slalom	SB-LL2	Emanuel Perathoner; Italy	54.28	Fabrice von Grünigen; Switzerland	56.29	Ben Tudhope; Australia	57.33
Banked slalom	SB-UL	Jacopo Luchini; Italy	56.28	Wang Pengyao; China	56.62	Jiang Zihao; China	57.03
Snowboard cross	SB-LL1	Wu Zhongwei; China		Noah Elliott; United States		Tyler Turner; Canada	
Snowboard cross	SB-LL2	Emanuel Perathoner; Italy		Ben Tudhope; Australia		Lee Je-hyuk; South Korea	
Snowboard cross	SB-UL	Ji Lijia; China		Zhu Yonggang; China		Aron Fahrni; Switzerland	

== Wheelchair curling ==
Event	Gold	Silver	Bronze
Mixed team	Canada; Mark Ideson; Jon Thurston; Ina Forrest; Collinda Joseph; Gil Dash	China; Wang Haitao; Chen Jianxin; Zhang Mingliang; Li Nana; Zhang Qiang	Sweden; Viljo Petersson-Dahl; Ronny Persson; Sabina Johansson; Kristina Ulander; Marcus Holm
Mixed doubles	China; Wang Meng; Yang Jinqiao	South Korea; Baek Hye-jin; Lee Yong-suk	Latvia; Poļina Rožkova; Agris Lasmans

== See also ==
- 2026 Winter Paralympics medal table
