= Para biathlon at the 2026 Winter Paralympics – Men's individual =

Men's individual at the XIV Paralympic Winter Games
- Paralympic biathlon
- Venue: Tesero Cross-Country Skiing Stadium.
- Dates: 8 March

Men's individual (visually impaired) at the XIV Paralympic Winter Games
- Competitors: 13 from 7 nations

Medalists
1st place, gold medalist(s)		Dang Hesong; Guide: Lu Hongda	China
2nd place, silver medalist(s)		Maksym Murashkovskyi; Guide: Vitaliy Trush	Ukraine
3rd place, bronze medalist(s)		Dmytro Suiarko; Guide: Oleksandr Nikonovych	Ukraine

Men's individual (standing) at the XIV Paralympic Winter Games
- Competitors: 19 from 11 nations

Medalists
1st place, gold medalist(s)		Cai Jiayun	China
2nd place, silver medalist(s)		Mark Arendz	Canada
3rd place, bronze medalist(s)		Marco Maier	Germany

Men's individual (sitting) at the XIV Paralympic Winter Games
- Competitors: 27 from 13 nations

Medalists
1st place, gold medalist(s)		Liu Zixu	China
2nd place, silver medalist(s)		Mao Zhongwu	China
3rd place, bronze medalist(s)		Taras Rad	Ukraine

The men's individual competition of the 2026 Winter Paralympics was held on 8 March 2026 at the Tesero Cross-Country Skiing Stadium.

== Medal table ==
* Host nation (Italy)

Rank	Nation	Gold	Silver	Bronze	Total
1	China (CHN)	3	1	0	4
2	Ukraine (UKR)	0	1	2	3
3	Canada (CAN)	0	1	0	1
4	Germany (GER)	0	0	1	1
Totals (4 entries)		3	3	3	9

== Visually impaired ==
In the biathlon visually impaired, the athlete with a visual impairement has a sighted guide. The two skiers are considered a team, and dual medals are awarded.

Rank	Bib	Name	Country	Class	Misses	Real time	Result	Difference
1st place, gold medalist(s)	121	Dang Hesong; Guide: Lu Hongda	China	NS2	0	32:30.4	31:31.9	
2nd place, silver medalist(s)	128	Maksym Murashkovskyi; Guide: Vitaliy Trush	Ukraine	NS3	0	33:41.1	33:41.1	+2:09.2
3rd place, bronze medalist(s)	126	Dmytro Suiarko; Guide: Oleksandr Nikonovych	Ukraine	NS3	1	32:51.1	33:51.1	+2:19.2
4	130	Iaroslav Reshetynskyi; Guide: Dmytro Drahun	Ukraine	NS3	0	34:18.9	34:18.9	+2:47.0
5	131	Oleksandr Kazik; Guide: Serhii Kucheriavyi	Ukraine	NS1	4	35:04.3	34:51.8	+3:19.9
6	129	Anatolii Kovalevskyi; Guide: Oleksandr Mukshyn	Ukraine	NS3	2	33:38.0	35:38.0	+4:06.1
7	125	Błażej Bieńko; Guide: Michał Lańda	Poland	NS3	1	35:57.6	36:57.6	+5:25.7
8	133	Nico Messinger; Guide: Robin Wunderle	Germany	NS2	5	33:55.9	37:54.8	+6:22.9
9	124	Anthony Chalençon; Guide: Florian Michelon	France	NS1	6	38:21.9	39:45.7	+8:13.8
10	132	Lennart Volkert; Guide: Nils Kolb	Germany	NS2	7	33:47.4	39:46.6	+8:14.7
11	123	Ryohei Ariyasu; Guide: Yuhei Fujita	Japan	NS3	3	39:11.5	42:11.5	+10:39.6
12	127	Paweł Gil; Guide: Radosław Koszyk	Poland	NS3	6	36:29.8	42:29.8	+10:57.9
13	122	Alex Lajtman; Guide: Marko Havran	Slovakia	NS3	6	39:47.2	45:47.2	+14:15.3

== Standing ==
Rank	Bib	Name	Country	Class	Misses	Real time	Result	Difference
1st place, gold medalist(s)	82	Cai Jiayun	China	LW8	1	30:37.6	30:24.1	
2nd place, silver medalist(s)	86	Mark Arendz	Canada	LW6	1	31:26.8	30:52.5	+28.4
3rd place, bronze medalist(s)	89	Marco Maier	Germany	LW8	1	31:22.6	31:07.3	+43.2
4	87	Liu Xiaobin	China	LW5/7	2	32:47.3	31:30.6	+1:06.5
5	85	Serhii Romaniuk	Ukraine	LW8	1	31:47.4	31:31.1	+1:07.0
6	78	Wu Junbao	China	LW5/7	1	34:17.7	31:51.9	+1:27.8
7	75	Serafym Drahun	Ukraine	LW8	3	30:43.8	32:30.0	+2:05.9
8	88	Benjamin Daviet	France	LW2	2	33:36.8	33:15.6	+2:51.5
9	84	Alexandr Gerlits	Kazakhstan	LW6	3	31:55.6	33:19.8	+2:55.7
10	81	Grygorii Vovchynskyi	Ukraine	LW8	3	31:39.2	33:23.2	+2:59.1
11	80	Alexander Ehler	Germany	LW4	1	33:46.6	33:25.5	+3:01.4
12	79	Yuan Mingshou	China	LW5/7	2	35:19.7	33:47.7	+3:23.6
13	77	Steffen Lehmker	Germany	LW6	2	34:59.2	35:14.2	+4:50.1
14	76	Stefan Egger-Riedmüller	Austria	LW4	3	34:58.2	36:34.3	+6:10.2
15	72	Luca Tavasci	Switzerland	LW8	6	34:41.3	39:18.0	+8:53.9
16	73	Cristian Toninelli	Italy	LW8	6	34:51.1	39:27.5	+9:03.4
17	83	Dmytro Sereda	Ukraine	LW8	7	35:41.4	41:15.7	+10:51.7
18	71	Keiichi Sato	Japan	LW8	10	35:54.4	44:28.2	+14:04.1
19	74	Miroslav Motejzík	Czech Republic	LW4	4	47:20.0	49:26.4	+19:02.3

== Sitting ==
Rank	Bib	Name	Country	Class	Misses	Real time	Result	Difference
1st place, gold medalist(s)	44	Liu Zixu	China	LW12	0	34:38.1	34:38.1	
2nd place, silver medalist(s)	38	Mao Zhongwu	China	LW11	1	36:40.5	35:06.5	+28.4
3rd place, bronze medalist(s)	46	Taras Rad	Ukraine	LW12	1	34:57.1	35:57.1	+1:19.0
4	47	Aaron Pike	United States	LW11	1	38:50.4	37:07.3	+2:29.2
5	36	Joshua Sweeney	United States	LW12	1	36:13.7	37:13.7	+2:35.6
6	45	Yerbol Khamitov	Kazakhstan	LW12	2	35:24.4	37:24.4	+2:46.3
7	42	Collin Cameron	Canada	LW11.5	1	37:57.5	37:26.4	+2:48.3
8	43	Liu Mengtao	China	LW12	2	35:59.1	37:59.1	+3:21.0
9	37	Oleksandr Aleksyk	Ukraine	LW12	2	36:23.6	38:23.6	+3:45.5
10	33	Vasyl Kravchuk	Ukraine	LW11	4	37:14.6	38:38.2	+4:00.1
11	29	Hryhorii Shymko	Ukraine	LW10.5	3	41:27.7	39:04.3	+4:26.2
12	34	Sin Eui-hyun	South Korea	LW12	2	37:13.3	39:13.3	+4:35.2
13	25	Marco Pisani	Italy	LW12	0	40:18.9	40:18.9	+5:40.8
14	39	Wang Tao	China	LW12	6	35:44.8	41:44.8	+7:06.7
15	35	Pavlo Bal	Ukraine	LW11.5	6	37:24.7	41:54.9	+7:16.8
16	32	Guilherme Rocha	Brazil	LW12	3	39:30.9	42:30.9	+7:52.8
17	26	Won Yoo-min	South Korea	LW11.5	2	42:39.7	42:57.3	+8:19.2
18	41	Scott Meenagh	Great Britain	LW12	5	37:59.9	42:59.9	+8:21.8
19	31	Takaharu Minamoto	Japan	LW12	5	38:59.5	43:59.5	+9:21.4
20	21	Dave Miln	Australia	LW12	3	41:27.0	44:27.0	+9:48.9
21	28	Sergey Ussoltsev	Kazakhstan	LW12	4	41:01.1	45:01.1	+10:23.0
22	23	Yuriy Berezin	Kazakhstan	LW12	5	40:01.6	45:01.6	+10:23.5
23	30	Higinio Rivero	Spain	LW10.5	7	43:48.5	45:06.8	+10:28.7
24	40	Derek Zaplotinsky	Canada	LW10.5	6	45:13.0	45:20.3	+10:42.2
25	27	Jeong Jae-seok	South Korea	LW10.5	10	42:50.4	47:16.2	+12:38.1
26	24	Robelson Lula	Brazil	LW12	10	38:54.9	48:54.9	+14:16.8
27	22	Omar Lorenzo	Argentina	LW11	14	49:23.4	59:56.0	+25:17.9

== See also ==
- Biathlon at the 2026 Winter Olympics
