= Para biathlon at the 2026 Winter Paralympics – Men's sprint =

Men's sprint at the XIV Paralympic Winter Games
- Paralympic biathlon
- Venue: Tesero Cross-Country Skiing Stadium.
- Dates: 7 March

Men's sprint (visually impaired) at the XIV Paralympic Winter Games
- Competitors: 17 from 9 nations

Medalists
1st place, gold medalist(s)		Oleksandr Kazik; Guide: Serhii Kucheriavyi	Ukraine
2nd place, silver medalist(s)		Iaroslav Reshetynskyi; Guide: Dmytro Drahun	Ukraine
3rd place, bronze medalist(s)		Anatolii Kovalevskyi; Guide: Oleksandr Mukshyn	Ukraine

Men's sprint (standing) at the XIV Paralympic Winter Games
- Competitors: 20 from 11 nations

Medalists
1st place, gold medalist(s)		Cai Jiayun	China
2nd place, silver medalist(s)		Liu Xiaobin	China
3rd place, bronze medalist(s)		Marco Maier	Germany

Men's sprint (sitting) at the XIV Paralympic Winter Games
- Competitors: 28 from 13 nations

Medalists
1st place, gold medalist(s)		Taras Rad	Ukraine
2nd place, silver medalist(s)		Liu Mengtao	China
3rd place, bronze medalist(s)		Liu Zixu	China

The men's sprint competition of the 2026 Winter Paralympics took place on 7 March 2026 at the Tesero Cross-Country Skiing Stadium.

== Medal table ==
* Host nation (Italy)

Rank	Nation	Gold	Silver	Bronze	Total
1	Ukraine (UKR)	2	1	1	4
2	China (CHN)	1	2	1	4
3	Germany (GER)	0	0	1	1
Totals (3 entries)		3	3	3	9

== Visually impaired ==
In the biathlon visually impaired, the athlete with a visual impairement has a sighted guide. The two skiers are considered a team, and dual medals are awarded.

Rank	Bib	Name	Country	Misses	Real time	Calculated Time	Difference
1st place, gold medalist(s)	135	Oleksandr Kazik; Guide: Serhii Kucheriavyi	Ukraine	0	20:01.9	17:37.7	
2nd place, silver medalist(s)	133	Iaroslav Reshetynskyi; Guide: Dmytro Drahun	Ukraine	0	18:40.1	18:40.1	+1:02.4
3rd place, bronze medalist(s)	134	Anatolii Kovalevskyi; Guide: Oleksandr Mukshyn	Ukraine	0	18:43.8	18:43.8	+1:06.1
4	127	Dang Hesong; Guide: Lu Hongda	China	1	19:19.3	18:44.5	+1:06.8
5	131	Dmytro Suiarko; Guide: Oleksandr Nikonovych	Ukraine	1	18:53.7	18:53.7	+1:16.0
6	130	Yu Shuang; Guide: Shang Jincai	China	2	19:01.3	19:01.3	+1:23.6
7	132	Maksym Murashkovskyi; Guide: Vitaliy Trush	Ukraine	2	20:17.9	20:17.9	+2:40.2
8	137	Lennart Volkert; Guide: Nils Kolb	Germany	1	21:01.3	20:23.5	+2:45.8
9	124	Błażej Bieńko; Guide: Michał Lańda	Poland	0	20:34.9	20:34.9	+2:57.2
10	129	Anthony Chalençon; Guide: Florian Michelon	France	4	23:29.5	20:40.4	+3:02.7
11	125	Theo Bold; Guide: Jakob Bold	Germany	2	20:56.0	20:56.0	+3:18.3
12	126	Zebastian Modin; Guide: Emil Talsi	Sweden	4	24:18.8	21:23.7	+3.46.0
13	136	Nico Messinger; Guide: Robin Wunderle	Germany	4	22:32.5	21:51.9	+4:14.2
14	128	Paweł Gil; Guide: Radosław Koszyk	Poland	2	22:09.4	22:09.4	+4:31.7
15	122	Ryohei Ariyasu; Guide: Yuhei Fujita	Japan	1	22:47.7	22:47.7	+5.10.0
16	121	Kim Min-yeong; Guide: Byeon Ju-yeong	South Korea	0	23:15.6	23:15.6	+5:37.9
17	123	Alex Lajtman; Guide: Marko Havran	Slovakia	5	25:53.1	25:53.1	+8:15.4

== Standing ==
Rank	Bib	Name	Country	Misses	Real time	Calculated Time	Difference
1st place, gold medalist(s)	83	Cai Jiayun	China	0	17:56.7	17:13.6	
2nd place, silver medalist(s)	87	Liu Xiaobin	China	0	19:32.7	17:35.4	+21.8
3rd place, bronze medalist(s)	86	Marco Maier	Germany	0	18:26.7	17:42.4	+28.8
4	82	Grygorii Vovchynskyi	Ukraine	0	18:26.9	17:42.6	+29.0
5	89	Mark Arendz	Canada	1	18:45.9	17:49.6	+36.0
6	88	Serhii Romaniuk	Ukraine	0	18:41.8	17:56.9	+43.3
7	90	Benjamin Daviet	France	0	19:56.9	18:33.1	+1:19.5
8	79	Wu Junbao	China	1	20:47.2	18:42.5	+1:28.9
9	78	Alexander Ehler	Germany	0	19:34.2	18:47.2	+1:33.6
10	77	Yuan Mingshou	China	1	21:17.7	19:09.9	+1:56.3
11	81	Alexandr Gerlits	Kazakhstan	3	20:18.8	19:17.9	+2:04.3
12	84	Karl Tabouret	France	3	22:18.4	19:24.4	+2:10.8
13	76	Steffen Lehmker	Germany	1	20:55.0	19:52.3	+2:38.7
14	80	Serafym Drahun	Ukraine	4	20:47.5	19:57.6	+2:44.0
15	74	Stefan Egger-Riedmüller	Austria	1	21:03.8	20:13.2	+2:59.6
16	71	Cristian Toninelli	Italy	2	21:40.8	20:48.8	+3:35.2
17	73	Luca Tavasci	Switzerland	4	22:47.0	21:52.3	+4:38.7
18	75	Keiichi Sato	Japan	4	22:50.1	21:55.3	+4:41.7
19	72	Miroslav Motejzík	Czech Republic	3	29:14.6	28:04.4	+10:50.8
	85	Dmytro Sereda	Ukraine	DNS			

== Sitting ==
Rank	Bib	Name	Country	Misses	Real time	Calculated Time	Difference
1st place, gold medalist(s)	46	Taras Rad	Ukraine	0	19:55.5	19:55.5	
2nd place, silver medalist(s)	45	Liu Mengtao	China	0	20:04.8	20:04.8	+9.3
3rd place, bronze medalist(s)	44	Liu Zixu	China	0	20:13.1	20:13.1	+17.6
4	37	Vasyl Kravchuk	Ukraine	0	21:59.4	20:27.0	+33.9
5	35	Joshua Sweeney	United States	0	20:28.1	20:28.1	+32.6
6	48	Aaron Pike	United States	0	22:05.2	20:32.4	+39.7
7	43	Mao Zhongwu	China	2	22:13.3	20:40.0	+47.8
8	47	Yerbol Khamitov	Kazakhstan	1	20:47.2	20:47.2	+51.7
9	36	Oleksandr Aleksyk	Ukraine	0	20:55.8	20:55.8	+1:00.3
10	38	Sin Eui-hyun	South Korea	0	21:08.4	21:08.4	+1:12.9
11	39	Collin Cameron	Canada	1	22:12.2	21:18.9	+1:26.9
12	34	Pavlo Bal	Ukraine	2	22:22.1	21:28.4	+1:36.8
13	41	Wang Tao	China	3	22:05.8	22:05.8	+2:10.3
14	42	Derek Zaplotinsky	Canada	2	25:35.2	22:15.6	+2:41.1
15	33	Hryhorii Shymko	Ukraine	3	25:56.0	22:33.7	+3:01.9
16	32	Guilherme Rocha	Brazil	0	22:48.9	22:48.9	+2:53.4
17	26	Marco Pisani	Italy	1	23:02.8	23:02.8	+3:07.3
18	30	Sergey Ussoltsev	Kazakhstan	0	23:12.4	23:12.4	+3:16.9
19	25	Michael Kneeland	United States	0	24:31.1	23:32.3	+3:45.8
20	31	Higinio Rivero	Spain	3	27:05.4	23:34.1	+4:11.3
21	28	Robelson Lula	Brazil	4	24:27.0	24:27.0	+4:31.5
22	27	Won Yoo-min	South Korea	1	25:29.6	24:28.4	+4:44.3
23	40	Scott Meenagh	Great Britain	6	24:54.3	24:54.3	+4:58.8
24	29	Takaharu Minamoto	Japan	6	25:27.3	25:27.3	+5:31.8
25	21	Yuriy Berezin	Kazakhstan	5	25:40.9	25:40.9	+5:45.4
26	24	David Miln	Australia	3	26:05.2	26:05.2	+6:09.7
27	22	Omar Lorenzo	Argentina	6	31:42.9	29:29.7	+10:17.4
28	23	Matt Brumby	Australia	2	37:52.8	32:34.6	+14:42.7

== See also ==
- Biathlon at the 2026 Winter Olympics
