= Para cross-country skiing at the 2026 Winter Paralympics – Men's 20 kilometre freestyle =

Men's 20 kilometre at the XIV Paralympic Winter Games
- Paralympic cross-country skiing
- Venue: Tesero Cross-Country Skiing Stadium
- Dates: 15 March

Men's 20 kilometre (visually impaired) at the XIV Paralympic Winter Games
- Competitors: 16 from 11 nations

Medalists
1st place, gold medalist(s)		Jake Adicoff; Guide: Peter Wolter	United States
2nd place, silver medalist(s)		Oleksandr Kazik; Guide: Serhii Kucheriavyi	Ukraine
3rd place, bronze medalist(s)		Anthony Chalençon; Guide: Florian Michelon	France

Men's 20 kilometre (standing) at the XIV Paralympic Winter Games
- Competitors: 29 from 15 nations

Medalists
1st place, gold medalist(s)		Wang Chenyang	China
2nd place, silver medalist(s)		Huang Lingxin	China
3rd place, bronze medalist(s)		Liu Xiaobin	China

Men's 20 kilometre (sitting) at the XIV Paralympic Winter Games
- Competitors: 29 from 17 nations

Medalists
1st place, gold medalist(s)		Ivan Golubkov	Russia
2nd place, silver medalist(s)		Mao Zhongwu	China
3rd place, bronze medalist(s)		Giuseppe Romele	Italy

The men's 20 kilometre competition of the 2026 Winter Paralympics was held on 15 March 2026 at the Tesero Cross-Country Skiing Stadium.

== Medal table ==
* Host nation (Italy)

Rank	Nation	Gold	Silver	Bronze	Total
1	China (CHN)	1	2	1	4
2	Russia (RUS)	1	0	0	1
2	United States (USA)	1	0	0	1
4	Ukraine (UKR)	0	1	0	1
5	France (FRA)	0	0	1	1
5	Italy (ITA)*	0	0	1	1
Totals (6 entries)		3	3	3	9

== Visually impaired ==
In the cross-country skiing visually impaired, the athlete with a visual impairment has a sighted guide. The two skiers are considered a team, and dual medals are awarded.

Rank	Bib	Name	Country	Class	%	Real time	Delta	Result
1st place, gold medalist(s)	238	Jake Adicoff; Guide: Peter Wolter	United States	NS3	100	42:17.4		42:17.4
2nd place, silver medalist(s)	237	Oleksandr Kazik; Guide: Serhii Kucheriavyi	Ukraine	NS1	88	48:11.6	+8.2	42:24.6
3rd place, bronze medalist(s)	230	Anthony Chalençon; Guide: Florian Michelon	France	NS1	88	49:16.7	+1:13.3	43:21.9
4	231	Lennart Volkert; Guide: Nils Kolb	Germany	NS2	97	44:50.8	+1:14.9	43:30.1
5	236	Yu Shuang; Guide: Shang Jincai	China	NS3	100	44:16.8	+1:59.4	44:16.8
6	225	Dang Hesong; Guide: Lu Hongda	China	NS2	97	45:57.0	+2:21.1	44:34.3
7	233	Dmytro Suiarko; Guide: Oleksandr Nikonovych	Ukraine	NS3	100	44:45.9	+2:28.5	44:45.9
8	229	Piotr Garbowski; Guide: Jakub Twardowski	Poland	NS3	100	46:36.8	+4:19.4	46:36.8
9	234	Inkki Inola; Guide: Reetu Inkilä	Finland	NS3	100	47:12.3	+4:54.9	47:12.3
10	228	Maksym Murashkovskyi; Guide: Vitaliy Trush	Ukraine	NS3	100	47:31.9	+5:14.5	47:31.9
11	235	Thomas Oxaal; Guide: Geir Lervik	Norway	NS3	100	47:55.2	+5:37.8	47:55.2
12	227	Endre Lykken; Guide: Lars Øvrebø	Norway	NS3	100	48:09.7	+5:52.3	48:09.7
13	232	Ihor Kravchuk; Guide: Andriy Dotsenko	Ukraine	NS3	100	48:11.1	+5:53.7	48:11.1
14	226	Jesse Bachinsky; Guide: Levi Nadlersmith	Canada	NS1	88	59:12.9	+11:09.5	52:06.6
15	221	Alex Lajtman; Guide: Marko Havran	Slovakia	NS3	100	52:38.0	+10:20.6	52:38.0
16	224	Ryohei Ariyasu; Guide: Yuhei Fujita	Japan	NS3	100	54:07.0	+11:49.6	54:07.0
	222	Max Nelson; Guide: Gus Schatzlein	United States	NS3	100	Did not start		
	223	Logan Lariviere; Guide: Joseph Hutton	Canada	NS3	100	Did not start		

== Standing ==
Rank	Bib	Name	Country	Class	%	Real time	Delta	Result
1st place, gold medalist(s)	149	Wang Chenyang	China	LW5/7	90	45:50.2		41:15.2
2nd place, silver medalist(s)	139	Huang Lingxin	China	LW5/7	90	47:11.6	+1:21.4	42:28.4
3rd place, bronze medalist(s)	138	Liu Xiaobin	China	LW5/7	90	47:48.8	+1:58.6	43:01.9
4	143	Alexandr Gerlits	Kazakhstan	LW6	95	45:57.4	+2:31.9	43:39.5
5	146	Serafym Drahun	Ukraine	LW8	96	45:52.1	+2:53.8	44:02.0
6	150	Taiki Kawayoke	Japan	LW5/7	90	49:05.7	+3:15.5	44:11.1
7	145	Marco Maier	Germany	LW8	96	46:19.8	+3:21.5	44:28.6
8	134	Vladislav Kobal	Kazakhstan	LW8	96	46:54.4	+3:56.1	45:01.8
9	137	Cai Jiayun	China	LW8	96	46:56.8	+3:58.5	45:04.1
10	147	Witold Skupień	Poland	LW5/7	90	50:07.1	+4:16.9	45:06.4
11	142	Karl Tabouret	France	LW3	87	52:06.7	+4:41.6	45:20.2
12	136	Benjamin Daviet	France	LW2	93	49:15.2	+4:53.7	45:48.3
13	130	Yuan Mingshou	China	LW5/7	90	51:22.3	+5:32.1	46:14.1
14	140	Raman Svirydzenka	Belarus	LW4	96	48:30.9	+5:32.6	46:34.5
15	144	Dmytro Sereda	Ukraine	LW8	96	49:29.9	+6:31.6	47:31.1
16	133	Nurlan Alimov	Kazakhstan	LW6	95	50:06.1	+6:40.6	47:35.8
17	132	Luca Tavasci	Switzerland	LW8	96	50:23.7	+7:25.4	48:22.8
18	126	Cristian Toninelli	Italy	LW8	96	50:29.3	+7:31.0	48:28.1
19	135	Kjartan Haugen	Norway	LW4	96	50:43.1	+7:44.8	48:41.4
20	141	Yoshihiro Nitta	Japan	LW8	96	51:19.5	+8:21.2	49:16.3
21	131	Keiichi Sato	Japan	LW8	96	52:45.6	+9:47.3	50:39.0
22	123	Mattia Dal Pastro	Italy	LW6	95	54:06.0	+10:40.5	51:23.7
23	124	Matěj Škoda	Czech Republic	LW8	96	54:36.3	+11:38.0	52:25.2
24	129	Keigo Iwamoto	Japan	LW3	87	1:00:17.0	+12:51.9	52:26.8
25	128	Wellington da Silva	Brazil	LW8	96	55:06.2	+12:07.9	52:54.0
26	122	Garik Melkonyan	Armenia	LW6	95	55:58.9	+12:33.4	53:11.0
26	125	Tsegmidiin Dashdorj	Mongolia	LW8	96	55:24.0	+12:25.7	53:11.0
28	127	Batmönkhiin Ganbold	Mongolia	LW6	95	58:03.5	+14:38.0	55:09.3
29	121	Miroslav Motejzík	Czech Republic	LW4	96	1:02:58.0	+19:59.7	1:00:26.9
	148	Serhii Romaniuk	Ukraine	LW8	96	Did not start		

== Sitting ==
Rank	Bib	Name	Country	Class	%	Real time	Delta	Result
1st place, gold medalist(s)	47	Ivan Golubkov	Russia	LW11.5	96	54:04.8		51:55.0
2nd place, silver medalist(s)	50	Mao Zhongwu	China	LW11	93	56:44.1	+54.6	52:45.8
3rd place, bronze medalist(s)	52	Giuseppe Romele	Italy	LW11.5	96	55:30.3	+1:25.5	53:17.1
4	49	Pavlo Bal	Ukraine	LW11.5	96	55:42.3	+1:37.5	53:28.6
5	51	Cristian Ribera	Brazil	LW11	93	57:43.2	+1:53.7	53:40.8
6	48	Zheng Peng	China	LW11	93	57:46.0	+1:56.5	53:43.4
7	45	Yerbol Khamitov	Kazakhstan	LW12	100	53:54.2	+1:59.2	53:54.2
8	43	Wang Tao	China	LW12	100	54:16.9	+2:21.9	54:16.9
9	33	Hryhorii Shymko	Ukraine	LW10.5	87	1:02:27.6	+2:47.1	54:20.4
10	46	Collin Cameron	Canada	LW12	100	57:04.4	+2:59.6	54:47.4
11	37	Shin Eui-hyun	South Korea	LW12	100	55:45.0	+3:50.0	55:45.0
12	41	Oleksandr Aleksyk	Ukraine	LW12	100	55:54.1	+3:59.1	55:54.1
13	39	Joshua Sweeney	United States	LW12	100	56:00.8	+4:05.8	56:00.8
14	36	Michele Biglione	Italy	LW12	100	56:01.5	+4:06.5	56:01.5
15	28	Scott Meenagh	Great Britain	LW12	100	57:49.7	+5:54.7	57:49.7
16	35	Krzysztof Plewa	Poland	LW12	100	58:16.8	+6:21.8	58:16.8
17	40	Daniel Cnossen	United States	LW12	100	58:30.5	+6:35.5	58:30.5
18	32	Jeong Jae-seok	South Korea	LW10.5	87	1:07:20.5	+7:40.0	58:35.2
19	34	Guilherme Rocha	Brazil	LW12	100	58:49.4	+6:54.4	58:49.4
20	26	Higinio Rivero	Spain	LW10.5	87	1:08:45.3	+9:04.8	59:49.0
21	31	Takaharu Minamoto	Japan	LW12	100	1:00:12.1	+8:17.1	1:00:12.1
22	29	Robelson Lula	Brazil	LW12	100	1:01:07.3	+9:12.3	1:01:07.3
23	21	David Miln	Australia	LW12	100	1:01:32.7	+9:37.7	1:01:32.7
24	25	Nicolás Lima	Argentina	LW11.5	96	1:05:09.7	+11:04.9	1:02:33.3
25	30	Arnt-Christian Furuberg	Sweden	LW11.5	96	1:05:23.6	+11:18.8	1:02:46.7
26	27	Giuseppe Spatola	Italy	LW12	100	1:03:40.5	+11:45.5	1:03:40.5
27	24	Leo Sammarelli	Canada	LW10	86	1:17:20.2	+16:58.1	1:06:30.6
28	22	Omar Lorenzo	Argentina	LW11	93	1:11:54.0	+16:04.5	1:06:52.0
29	23	David Chávez	El Salvador	LW10.5	87	1:17:29.0	+17:48.5	1:07:24.6
	38	Vasyl Kravchuk	Ukraine	LW11	93	Did not start		
	42	Aaron Pike	United States	LW11	93	Did not start		
	44	Derek Zaplotinsky	Canada	LW10.5	87	Did not start		

== See also ==
- Cross-country skiing at the 2026 Winter Olympics
