= Ukraine at the 2026 Winter Paralympics =

- Flag of Ukraine
- IPC code: UKR
- NPC: National Sports Committee for the Disabled of Ukraine
- Website: www.paralympic.org.ua

in Milan and Cortina d'Ampezzo, Italy 6 March 2026 – 15 March 2026
- Competitors: 25 (and 9 sighted guides) (17 men and 8 women) in 4 sports
- Medals Ranked 7th: Gold 3 Silver 8 Bronze 8 Total 19

Winter Paralympics appearances (overview)
- 1998; 2002; 2006; 2010; 2014; 2018; 2022; 2026

Other related appearances
- Soviet Union (1988); Unified Team (1992)

Ukraine competed at the 2026 Winter Paralympics in Milan and Cortina d'Ampezzo, Italy, from 4 to 15 March 2026. It is the eighth consecutive appearance at the Winter Paralympic Games as an independent nation since 1998.

By the end of the first competition day, Ukraine ranked 1st at the medal table, winning 3 gold, 1 silver and 2 bronze medals. Ukraine managed to clench a podium sweep at para biathlon with Oleksandr Kazik and Serhii Kucheriavyi winning gold, Iaroslav Reshetynskyi and Dmytro Drahun winning silver, and Anatolii Kovalevskyi and Oleksandr Mukshyn winning bronze at the same event.

== Medalists ==
The following Ukrainian competitors won medals at the games. In the discipline sections below, the medalists' names are bold.

Medal	Name	Sport	Event	Date
Gold	Taras Rad	Para biathlon	Men's sprint, sitting	7 March
Gold	Oleksandra Kononova	Para biathlon	Women's sprint, standing	7 March
Gold	Oleksandr Kazik; Guide: Serhii Kucheriavyi	Para biathlon	Men's sprint, visually impaired	7 March
Silver	Iaroslav Reshetynskyi; Guide: Dmytro Drahun	Para biathlon	Men's sprint, visually impaired	7 March
Silver	Maksym Murashkovskyi; Guide: Vitaliy Trush	Para biathlon	Men's individual, visually impaired	8 March
Silver	Taras Rad	Para biathlon	Men's sprint pursuit, sitting	13 March
Silver	Iryna Bui	Para biathlon	Women's sprint pursuit, standing	13 March
Silver	Grygorii Vovchynskyi	Para biathlon	Men's sprint pursuit, standing	13 March
Silver	Oleksandr Kazik; Guide: Serhii Kucheriavyi	Para biathlon	Men's sprint pursuit, visually impaired	13 March
Silver	Pavlo Bal; Taras Rad; Oleksandra Kononova; Liudmyla Liashenko	Para cross-country skiing	Mixed 4 × 2.5 kilometre relay	14 March
Silver	Oleksandr Kazik; Guide: Serhii Kucheriavyi	Para cross-country skiing	Men's 20 kilometre freestyle, visually impaired	15 March
Bronze	Liudmyla Liashenko	Para biathlon	Women's sprint, standing	7 March
Bronze	Anatolii Kovalevskyi; Guide: Oleksandr Mukshyn	Para biathlon	Men's sprint, visually impaired	7 March
Bronze	Taras Rad	Para biathlon	Men's individual, sitting	8 March
Bronze	Oleksandra Kononova	Para biathlon	Women's individual, standing	8 March
Bronze	Dmytro Suiarko; Guide: Oleksandr Nikonovych	Para biathlon	Men's individual, visually impaired	8 March
Bronze	Oleksandra Kononova	Para biathlon	Women's sprint pursuit, standing	13 March
Bronze	Anatolii Kovalevskyi; Guide: Oleksandr Mukshyn	Para biathlon	Men's sprint pursuit, visually impaired	13 March
Bronze	Oleksandra Kononova	Para cross-country skiing	Women's 20 kilometre freestyle, standing	15 March

Medals by sport
Sport	1st place, gold medalist(s)	2nd place, silver medalist(s)	3rd place, bronze medalist(s)	Total
Para biathlon	3	6	7	16
Para cross-country skiing	0	2	1	3
Total	3	8	8	19

Medals by date
Day	Date	1st place, gold medalist(s)	2nd place, silver medalist(s)	3rd place, bronze medalist(s)	Total
1	March 7	3	1	2	6
2	March 8	0	1	3	4
3-6	March 9-12	0	0	0	0
7	March 13	0	4	2	6
8	March 14	0	1	0	1
9	March 15	0	1	1	2
Total		3	8	8	19

Medals by gender
Gender	1st place, gold medalist(s)	2nd place, silver medalist(s)	3rd place, bronze medalist(s)	Total
Male	2	6	4	12
Female	1	1	4	6
Mixed	0	1	0	1
Total	3	8	8	19

Multiple medalists
Name	Sport	1st place, gold medalist(s)	2nd place, silver medalist(s)	3rd place, bronze medalist(s)	Total
Taras Rad	Para biathlon / Para cross-country skiing	1	2	1	4
Oleksandr Kazik; Guide: Serhii Kucheriavyi	Para biathlon / Para cross-country skiing	1	2	0	3
Oleksandra Kononova	Para biathlon / Para cross-country skiing	1	1	3	5
Liudmyla Liashenko	Para biathlon / Para cross-country skiing	0	1	1	2
Anatolii Kovalevskyi; Guide: Oleksandr Mukshyn	Para biathlon	0	0	2	2

== Competitors ==
The following is the list of number of competitors participating at the Games per sport/discipline. Notably, 20 athletes participate in both para biathlon and para cross-country skiing.

Sport	Men	Women	Total
Para alpine skiing	1	0	1
Para biathlon	15	8	23
Para cross-country skiing	14	6	20
Para snowboard	1	0	1
Total	17	8	25

== Para alpine skiing ==
Ukraine competed in para alpine skiing with one athlete.

Athlete	Event	Classification	Run 1		Run 2		Total		Ref
Athlete	Event	Classification	Time	Rank	Time	Rank	Time	Rank	Ref
Maksym Heliuta	Men's giant slalom, standing	LW6/8-1	1:28.30	29	1:25.17	27	2:53.47	27	
Maksym Heliuta	Men's slalom, standing	LW6/8-1	DNF						

== Para biathlon ==
Ukraine competed in para biathlon with 23 athletes. Ukraine won 16 medals in total in this sport, seven of them in men's visually impaired competitions, five in women's standing competitions, three in men's sitting competitions, and one in men's standing competition.

The results below are divided into sub-categories by gender: men and women, and further divided by type of para biathlon runs: individual, sprint and pursuit.

=== Men ===
Individual

Athlete	Event	Classification	Factor	Time	Misses	Factored time	Rank	Ref
Oleksandr Kazik; Guide: Serhii Kucheriavyi	Visually impaired	NS1	88%	39:37.1	4 (2+0+1+1)	34:51.8	5	
Anatolii Kovalevskyi; Guide: Oleksandr Mukshyn	Visually impaired	NS3	100%	35:38.0	2 (1+1+0+0)	—N/a	6	
Maksym Murashkovskyi; Guide: Vitaliy Trush	Visually impaired	NS3	100%	33:41.1	0 (0+0+0+0)	—N/a	2nd place, silver medalist(s)	
Iaroslav Reshetynskyi; Guide: Dmytro Drahun	Visually impaired	NS3	100%	34:18.9	0 (0+0+0+0)	—N/a	4	
Dmytro Suiarko; Guide: Oleksandr Nikonovych	Visually impaired	NS3	100%	33:51.1	1 (1+0+0+0)	—N/a	3rd place, bronze medalist(s)	
Serafym Drahun	Standing	LW8	96%	33:51.3	3 (0+1+2+0)	32:30.0	7	
Serhii Romaniuk	Standing	LW8	96%	32:49.9	1 (1+0+0+0)	31:31.1	5	
Dmytro Sereda	Standing	LW8	96%	41:17.9	7 (3+1+2+1)	39:38.8	17	
Grygorii Vovchynskyi	Standing	LW8	96%	34:46.7	3 (1+1+0+1)	33:23.2	10	
Oleksandr Aleksyk	Sitting	LW12	100%	38:23.6	2 (0+0+1+1)	—N/a	9	
Taras Rad	Sitting	LW12	100%	35:57.1	1 (0+1+0+0)	—N/a	3rd place, bronze medalist(s)	
Pavlo Bal	Sitting	LW11.5	96%	43:39.7	6 (2+2+2+0)	41:54.9	15	
Vasyl Kravchuk	Sitting	LW11	93%	41:32.7	4 (2+1+0+1)	38:38.2	10	
Hryhorii Shymko	Sitting	LW10.5	87%	44:54.6	3 (0+1+2+0)	39:04.3	11	

Sprint

Athlete	Event	Classification	Factor	Time	Misses	Factored time	Rank	Ref
Oleksandr Kazik; Guide: Serhii Kucheriavyi	Visually impaired	NS1	88%	20:01.9	0 (0+0)	17:37.7	1st place, gold medalist(s)	
Anatolii Kovalevskyi; Guide: Oleksandr Mukshyn	Visually impaired	NS3	100%	18:43.8	0 (0+0)	—N/a	3rd place, bronze medalist(s)	
Maksym Murashkovskyi; Guide: Vitaliy Trush	Visually impaired	NS3	100%	20:17.9	2 (1+1)	—N/a	7	
Iaroslav Reshetynskyi; Guide: Dmytro Drahun	Visually impaired	NS3	100%	18:40.1	0 (0+0)	—N/a	2nd place, silver medalist(s)	
Dmytro Suiarko; Guide: Oleksandr Nikonovych	Visually impaired	NS3	100%	18:53.7	1 (0+1)	—N/a	5	
Serafym Drahun	Standing	LW8	96%	20:47.5	4 (1+3)	19:57.6	14	
Serhii Romaniuk	Standing	LW8	96%	18:41.8	0 (0+0)	17:56.9	6	
Dmytro Sereda	Standing	LW8	96%	DNS				
Grygorii Vovchynskyi	Standing	LW8	96%	18:26.9	0 (0+0)	17:42.6	4	
Oleksandr Aleksyk	Sitting	LW12	100%	20:55.8	0 (0+0)	—N/a	9	
Taras Rad	Sitting	LW12	100%	19:55.5	0 (0+0)	—N/a	1st place, gold medalist(s)	
Pavlo Bal	Sitting	LW11.5	96%	22:22.1	2 (1+1)	21:28.4	12	
Vasyl Kravchuk	Sitting	LW11	93%	21:59.4	0 (0+0)	20:27.0	4	
Hryhorii Shymko	Sitting	LW10.5	87%	25:56.0	3 (1+2)	22:33.7	15	

Sprint pursuit

Start time for finals includes both gap to the leader in qualification, and also compensation for handicaps.

Athlete	Event	Classification	Factor	Qualification				Final				Ref
Athlete	Event	Classification	Factor	Time	Misses	Factored time	Rank	Start behind	Total time	Misses	Rank	Ref
Oleksandr Kazik; Guide: Serhii Kucheriavyi	Visually impaired	NS1	88%	11:37.8	1 (1+0)	10:14.1	1 Q	—N/a	11:53.0	1 (0+1)	2nd place, silver medalist(s)	
Anatolii Kovalevskyi; Guide: Oleksandr Mukshyn	Visually impaired	NS3	100%	10:26.7	0 (0+0)	—N/a	2 Q	1:34	12:13.7	0 (0+0)	3rd place, bronze medalist(s)	
Ihor Kravchuk; Guide: Andriy Dotsenko	Visually impaired	NS3	100%	10:53.4	0 (0+0)	—N/a	5 Q	2:01	13:12.7	2 (2+0)	6	
Iaroslav Reshetynskyi; Guide: Dmytro Drahun	Visually impaired	NS3	100%	10:44.5	0 (0+0)	—N/a	4 Q	1:52	13:07.0	1 (1+0)	5	
Dmytro Suiarko; Guide: Oleksandr Nikonovych	Visually impaired	NS3	100%	11:36.7	2 (1+1)	—N/a	8 Q	DNS				
Serafym Drahun	Standing	LW8	96%	10:53.0	2 (0+2)	10:26.9	7 Q	0:57	12:02.9	4 (1+3)	5	
Serhii Romaniuk	Standing	LW8	96%	11:12.5	1 (0+1)	10:45.6	10 Q	DNS				
Dmytro Sereda	Standing	LW8	96%	11:52.6	4 (1+3)	11:24.1	14 Q	1:55	12:45.2	0 (0+0)	10	
Grygorii Vovchynskyi	Standing	LW8	96%	10:26.6	2 (2+0)	10:01.5	3 Q	0:32	10:33.6	0 (0+0)	2nd place, silver medalist(s)	
Oleksandr Aleksyk	Sitting	LW12	100%	9:23:8	1 (1+0)	—N/a	12 Q	1:34	11:59.6	3 (3+0)	13	
Taras Rad	Sitting	LW12	100%	8:39.7	0 (0+0)	—N/a	3 Q	0:50	10:00.5	1 (1+0)	2nd place, silver medalist(s)	
Pavlo Bal	Sitting	LW11.5	96%	9:25.5	0 (0+0)	9:02.9	8 Q	0:52	11:57.5	3 (1+2)	12	
Vasyl Kravchuk	Sitting	LW11	93%	9:30.4	0 (0+0)	8:50.5	4 Q	0:22	10:55.3	2 (1+1)	8	
Hryhorii Shymko	Sitting	LW10.5	87%	10:27.2	2 (2+0)	9:05.7	10 Q	—N/a	10:58.8	1 (0+1)	9	

=== Women ===
Individual

Athlete	Event	Classification	Factor	Time	Misses	Factored time	Rank	Ref
Oleksandra Danylenko; Guide: Mykyta Stakhurskyi	Visually impaired	NS1	88%	43:46.1	0 (0+0+0+0)	38:31.0	4	
Romana Lobasheva; Guide: Anastasiia Shabaldina	Visually impaired	NS3	100%	44:31.9	4 (1+1+1+1)	—N/a	12	
Oksana Shyshkova; Guide: Artem Kazarian	Visually impaired	NS3	100%	42:57.3	4 (1+2+1+0)	—N/a	9	
Ilona Varkovets; Guide: Daryna Kovalova	Visually impaired	NS3	100%	42:32.9	3 (2+0+0+1)	—N/a	8	
Iryna Bui	Standing	LW8	96%	38:00.0	3 (0+1+0+2)	36:28.8	7	
Bohdana Konashuk	Standing	LW8	96%	40:35.5	4 (0+2+1+1)	38:58.1	9	
Oleksandra Kononova	Standing	LW8	96%	35:02.0	1 (1+0+0+0)	33:37.9	3rd place, bronze medalist(s)	
Liudmyla Liashenko	Standing	LW8	96%	36:05.6	2 (0+1+0+1)	34:39.0	4	

Sprint

Athlete	Event	Classification	Factor	Time	Misses	Factored time	Rank	Ref
Oleksandra Danylenko; Guide: Mykyta Stakhurskyi	Visually impaired	NS1	88%	28:18.3	4 (1+3)	24:54.5	11	
Romana Lobasheva; Guide: Anastasiia Shabaldina	Visually impaired	NS3	100%	25:29.0	4 (4+0)	—N/a	12	
Oksana Shyshkova; Guide: Artem Kazarian	Visually impaired	NS3	100%	22:07.5	0 (0+0)	—N/a	6	
Ilona Varkovets; Guide: Daryna Kovalova	Visually impaired	NS3	100%	23:26.9	1 (0+1)	—N/a	9	
Iryna Bui	Standing	LW8	96%	20:19.8	0 (0+0)	19:31.0	5	
Bohdana Konashuk	Standing	LW8	96%	21:32.7	2 (0+2)	20:41.0	9	
Oleksandra Kononova	Standing	LW8	96%	19:28.2	0 (0+0)	18:41.5	1st place, gold medalist(s)	
Liudmyla Liashenko	Standing	LW8	96%	20:02.0	1 (0+1)	19:13.9	3rd place, bronze medalist(s)	

Sprint pursuit

Start time for finals includes both gap to the leader in qualification, and also compensation for handicaps.

Athlete	Event	Classification	Factor	Qualification				Final				Ref
Athlete	Event	Classification	Factor	Time	Misses	Factored time	Rank	Start behind	Total time	Misses	Rank	Ref
Oleksandra Danylenko; Guide: Mykyta Stakhurskyi	Visually impaired	NS1	88%	14:47.5	1 (1+0)	13:01.0	7 Q	0:44	16:13.5	0 (0+0)	10	
Romana Lobasheva; Guide: Anastasiia Shabaldina	Visually impaired	NS3	100%	13:56.0	3 (2+1)	—N/a	11 Q	3:14	18:19.6	4 (3+1)	11	
Oksana Shyshkova; Guide: Artem Kazarian	Visually impaired	NS3	100%	13:15.6	1 (1+0)	—N/a	9 Q	2:33	15:26.9	0 (0+0)	7	
Ilona Varkovets; Guide: Daryna Kovalova	Visually impaired	NS3	100%	13:14.4	2 (1+1)	—N/a	8 Q	2:32	15:56.3	1 (0+1)	9	
Iryna Bui	Standing	LW8	96%	11:16.8	0 (0+0)	210:49.7	2 Q	0:50	12:35.7	1 (1+0)	2nd place, silver medalist(s)	
Bohdana Konashuk	Standing	LW8	96%	11:42.3	1 (0+1)	11:14.2	6 Q	1:15	13:38.2	2 (1+1)	7	
Oleksandra Kononova	Standing	LW8	96%	11:39.7	2 (1+1)	11:11.7	5 Q	1:12	12:49.0	2 (1+1)	3rd place, bronze medalist(s)	
Liudmyla Liashenko	Standing	LW8	96%	12:17.0	5 (2+3)	11:47.5	9 Q	1:48	13:36.5	2 (1+1)	6	

== Para cross-country skiing ==
Ukraine competed in para cross-country skiing with 20 athletes. Ukraine won three medals in total in this sport.

The results below are divided into sub-categories by gender: men, women and mixed, and further divided by type of para cross-country skiing runs: 20km freestyle, 10km classical, sprints and relays.

=== Men ===
20 kilometre freestyle

Athlete	Event	Classification	Factor	Time	Factored time	Rank	Ref
**Oleksandr Kazik**; **Guide: Serhii Kucheriavyi**	Visually impaired	NS1	88%	48:11.6	42:24.6	2nd place, silver medalist(s)	
Ihor Kravchuk; Guide: Andriy Dotsenko	Visually impaired	NS3	100%	48:11.1	—N/a	13	
Maksym Murashkovskyi; Guide: Vitaliy Trush	Visually impaired	NS3	100%	47:31.9	—N/a	10	
Dmytro Suiarko; Guide: Oleksandr Nikonovych	Visually impaired	NS3	100%	44:45.9	—N/a	7	
Serafym Drahun	Standing	LW8	96%	45:52.1	44:02.0	5	
Serhii Romaniuk	Standing	LW8	96%	DNS			
Dmytro Sereda	Standing	LW8	96%	49:29.9	47:31.1	15	
Oleksandr Aleksyk	Sitting	LW12	100%	55:54.1	—N/a	12	
Pavlo Bal	Sitting	LW11.5	96%	55:42.3	53:28.6	4	
Vasyl Kravchuk	Sitting	LW11	93%	DNS			
Hryhorii Shymko	Sitting	LW10.5	87%	1:02:27.6	54:20.4	9	

10 kilometre classical

Athlete	Event	Classification	Factor	Time	Factored time	Rank	Ref
Ihor Kravchuk; Guide: Andriy Dotsenko	Visually impaired	NS3	100%	32:32.2	—N/a	9	
Dmytro Suiarko; Guide: Oleksandr Nikonovych	Visually impaired	NS3	100%	30:17.7	—N/a	5	

Sprint

Athlete	Event	Classification	Factor	Qualification			Semifinal		Final		Ref
Athlete	Event	Classification	Factor	Time	Factored time	Rank	Time	Rank	Time	Rank	Ref
Ihor Kravchuk; Guide: Andriy Dotsenko	Visually impaired	NS3	100%	2:45.87	—N/a	10	Did not advance			10	
Dmytro Suiarko; Guide: Oleksandr Nikonovych	Visually impaired	NS3	100%	2:35.03	—N/a	6 **Q**	2:57.4	3	Did not advance	6	
Serafym Drahun	Standing	LW8	92%	2:47.01	2:33.65	8 **Q**	3:03.7	6	Did not advance	11	
Grygorii Vovchynskyi	Standing	LW8	92%	3:01.23	2:46.73	18	Did not advance			18	
Oleksandr Aleksyk	Sitting	LW12	100%	2:15.92	—N/a	8 **Q**	2:30.7	3 **Q**	2:31.2	4	
Taras Rad	Sitting	LW12	100%	2:15.98	—N/a	9 **Q**	2:30.8	4	Did not advance	7	
Pavlo Bal	Sitting	LW11.5	96%	2:16.77	2:11.30	3 **Q**	2:40.5	2 **Q**	2:32.3	5	
Vasyl Kravchuk	Sitting	LW11	93%	2:27.72	2:17.38	12 **Q**	2:37.5	6	Did not advance	12	
Hryhorii Shymko	Sitting	LW10.5	87%	2:37.72	2:17.22	11 **Q**	2:51.3	5	Did not advance	8	

=== Women ===
20 kilometre freestyle

Athlete	Event	Classification	Factor	Time	Factored time	Rank	Ref
Romana Lobasheva	Visually impaired	NS3	100%	55:43.8	—N/a	7	
Oksana Shyshkova	Visually impaired	NS3	100%	54:22.3	—N/a	6	
Iryna Bui	Standing	LW8	96%	52:18.2	50:12.7	5	
Bohdana Konashuk	Standing	LW8	96%	54:47.9	52:36.4	9	
**Oleksandra Kononova**	Standing	LW8	96%	50:45.2	48:43.4	3rd place, bronze medalist(s)	
Liudmyla Liashenko	Standing	LW8	96%	51:20.3	49:17.1	4	

10 kilometre classical

Athlete	Event	Classification	Factor	Time	Factored time	Rank	Ref
Romana Lobasheva; Guide: Anastasiia Shabaldina	Visually impaired	NS3	100%	41:07.2	—N/a	9	

Sprint

Athlete	Event	Classification	Factor	Qualification			Semifinal		Final		Ref
Athlete	Event	Classification	Factor	Time	Factored time	Rank	Time	Rank	Time	Rank	Ref
Romana Lobasheva; Guide: Anastasiia Shabaldina	Visually impaired	NS3	100%	3:23.96	—N/a	9	Did not advance			9	
Oksana Shyshkova; Guide: Artem Kazarian	Visually impaired	NS3	100%	3:19.69	—N/a	8 **Q**	3:37.7	4	Did not advance	8	
Iryna Bui	Standing	LW8	92%	3:33.57	3:16.48	12 **Q**	3:58.8	5	Did not advance	10	
Oleksandra Kononova	Standing	LW8	92%	3:24.96	3:08.56	8 **Q**	DNS		Did not advance	12	
Liudmyla Liashenko	Standing	LW8	92%	3:17.51	3:01.71	5 **Q**	3:47.3	4	Did not advance	7	

=== Relay ===
Results are for each leg, while results in bold are the total results of the teams.

Athlete	Event	Classification	Total factor	Time	Rank	Ref
**Pavlo Bal**; **Taras Rad**; **Oleksandra Kononova**; **Liudmyla Liashenko**	Mixed 4 × 2.5 km relay	LW11.5; LW12; LW8; LW8	84% 88% 81% 81% **334%**	5:48.5; 5:47.2; 5:58.3; 6:02.7; **23:36.7**	3; 1; 3; 5 (silver)	
Dmytro Suiarko; Guide: Oleksandr Nikonovych; Vasyl Kravchuk; Grygorii Vovchynskyi; Serafym Drahun	Open 4 × 2.5 km relay	NS3; LW11; LW8; LW8	100% 81% 96% 96% **373%**	5:22.3; 6:24.3; 5:31.4; 5:10.8; **22:28.8**	1; 7; 1; 3; **4**	

== Para snowboard ==
Ukraine competed in para snowboard with one athlete.

Slalom

Athlete	Event	Run 1	Run 2	Best	Rank	Ref
Vladyslav Khilchenko	Men's banked slalom, SB-UL	1:13.32	1:12.24	1:12.24	21	

Snowboard cross

Athlete	Event	Seeding				Pre-heats	Quarterfinal	Semifinal	Final		Ref
Athlete	Event	Run 1	Run 2	Best	Rank	Position	Position	Position	Position	Rank	Ref
Vladyslav Khilchenko	Men's snowboard cross, SB-UL	1:11:91	1:06.87	1:06.87	20	4	Did not advance			20	

== Sources ==
- 2026 Winter Paralympics results
