= 2026 Winter Paralympics medal table =

List of medals won by Paralympic delegations

2026 Winter Paralympics medals
- Location: Milan & Cortina d'Ampezzo, Italy

Highlights
- Most gold medals: China (15)
- Most total medals: China (44)
- Medalling NPCs: 27

The medal table of the 2026 Winter Paralympics ranks the participating National Paralympic Committees (NPCs) by the number of gold medals that were won by their athletes during the competition. The 2026 Paralympics were the fourteenth Games held, a quadrennial competition open to athletes with physical and intellectual disabilities. The games were held in Milan, Cortina d'Ampezzo, and other areas in Lombardy and Northeast Italy from 6 to 15 March 2026. There were 79 medal events. A mixed doubles event made its debut in wheelchair curling.

Brazil and Latvia both won the first-ever Winter Paralympic medal in their histories, with Cristian Ribera winning the silver medal in the Men's sitting cross-country skiing sprint, and Poļina Rožkova and Agris Lasmans winning the bronze in the mixed doubles curling respectively.

Ribera's medal was also the first in Winter Paralympic history won by a tropical, Latin American or South American National Paralympic Committee.

== Medals ==
On 15 July 2025, the Milano Cortina 2026 Olympic and Paralympic Organising Committee unveiled the designs of the medals. The reverse of each medal represents Braille on the left and the Games logo on the right, with the Paralympics logo on the obverse. Each medal is 80mm wide and 10mm thick. They were created by the Istituto Poligrafico e Zecca dello Stato (IPZS).

== Medal table ==
Two bronze medals were awarded for a third-place tie in the Women's sprint pursuit, visually impaired.

Key

* Host nation (Italy)

2026 Winter Paralympics medal table
Rank	NPC	Gold	Silver	Bronze	Total
1	China	15	13	16	44
2	United States	13	5	6	24
3	Russia	8	1	3	12
4	Italy*	7	7	2	16
5	Austria	7	2	4	13
6	France	4	4	4	12
7	Ukraine	3	8	8	19
8	Canada	3	4	8	15
9	Netherlands	3	3	1	7
10	Sweden	3	0	4	7
11	Germany	2	6	9	17
12	Norway	2	4	2	8
13	South Korea	2	4	1	7
14	Switzerland	2	2	2	6
15	Spain	2	1	1	4
16	Czech Republic	1	4	1	6
17	Belarus	1	1	0	2
18	Kazakhstan	1	0	1	2
19	Japan	0	3	1	4
20	Finland	0	2	0	2
21	Australia	0	1	1	2
21	Poland	0	1	1	2
23	Brazil	0	1	0	1
23	Great Britain	0	1	0	1
23	New Zealand	0	1	0	1
26	Slovakia	0	0	3	3
27	Latvia	0	0	1	1
Totals (27 entries)		79	79	80	238

=== Podium sweeps ===
Date	Sport	Event	Team	Gold	Silver	Bronze	Ref
7 March	Para biathlon	Men's sprint, visually impaired	Ukraine	Oleksandr Kazik; Guide: Serhii Kucheriavyi	Iaroslav Reshetynskyi; Guide: Dmytro Drahun	Anatolii Kovalevskyi; Guide: Oleksandr Mukshyn	
15 March	Para cross-country skiing	Men's 20km, standing	China	Wang Chenyang	Huang Lingxin	Liu Xiaobin	

== See also ==
- All-time Paralympic Games medal table
- 2026 Winter Olympics medal table
- List of 2026 Winter Paralympics medal winners
