= Japan at the 2026 Winter Paralympics =

- Flag of Japan
- IPC code: JPN
- NPC: Japan Paralympic Committee
- Website: www.parasports.or.jp (in Japanese)

in Milan & Cortina d'Ampezzo, Italy 6 March 2026 – 15 March 2026
- Competitors: 44 (34 men and 10 women) in 6 sports
- Flag bearers (opening): Aki Ogawa & Junta Kosuda
- Flag bearers (closing): Aki Ogawa & Junta Kosuda
- Medals Ranked 19th: Gold 0 Silver 3 Bronze 1 Total 4

Winter Paralympics appearances (overview)
- 1976; 1980; 1984; 1988; 1992; 1994; 1998; 2002; 2006; 2010; 2014; 2018; 2022; 2026

Japan was represented at the 2026 Winter Paralympics in Milan & Cortina d'Ampezzo, Italy, which took place between 6–15 March 2026. In total, 44 athletes competed.

== Medallists ==
Medal	Name	Sport	Event	Date
Silver	Momoka Muraoka	Para alpine skiing	Women's super-G, sitting	9 March
Silver	Momoka Muraoka	Para alpine skiing	Women's giant slalom, sitting	12 March
Silver	Daichi Oguri	Para snowboard	Men's banked slalom, SB-LL1	13 March
Bronze	Takeshi Suzuki	Para alpine skiing	Men's slalom, sitting	15 March

== Competitors ==
The following is the list of number of competitors participating at the Games per sport/discipline.

Sport	Men	Women	Total
Alpine skiing	3	2	5
Biathlon	7*	5*	12*
Cross-country skiing	7*	5*	12*
Curling	1	1	2
Ice hockey	17	1	18
Snowboarding	6	1	7
Total	34	10	44

== Para alpine skiing ==
Athlete	Class	Event	Run 1		Run 2		Total	
Athlete	Class	Event	Time	Rank	Time	Rank	Time	Rank
Gakuta Koike	LW6/8–1	Men's downhill, standing	—N/a				1:23.13	15
Gakuta Koike	LW6/8–1	Men's super-G, standing	—N/a				1:17.76	16
Gakuta Koike	LW6/8–1	Men's giant slalom, standing						
Gakuta Koike	LW6/8–1	Men's slalom, standing						
Gakuta Koike	LW6/8–1	Men's super combined, standing	1:21.95	12	48.95	9	2:10.90	10
Taiki Morii	LW11	Men's downhill, sitting	—N/a				DNF	
Taiki Morii	LW11	Men's super-G, sitting	—N/a				1:18.34	11
Taiki Morii	LW11	Men's giant slalom, sitting						
Taiki Morii	LW11	Men's slalom, sitting						
Taiki Morii	LW11	Men's super combined, sitting	1:17.94	7	43.64	3	2:01.58	5
Takeshi Suzuki	LW12–2	Men's downhill, sitting	—N/a				1:21.27	6
Takeshi Suzuki	LW12–2	Men's super-G, sitting	—N/a				1:15.45	7
Takeshi Suzuki	LW12–2	Men's giant slalom, sitting						
Takeshi Suzuki	LW12–2	Men's slalom, sitting						
Takeshi Suzuki	LW12–2	Men's super combined, sitting	1:18.27	8	44.20	9	2:02.47	6
Ammi Hondo	LW6/8–2	Women's downhill, standing	—N/a				DNF	
Ammi Hondo	LW6/8–2	Women's super-G, standing	—N/a				1:16.40	8
Ammi Hondo	LW6/8–2	Women's giant slalom, standing	1:19.03	12	1:22.32	11	2:41.35	10
Ammi Hondo	LW6/8–2	Women's slalom, standing						
Ammi Hondo	LW6/8–2	Super combined, sitting	1:24.62	10	50.42	9	2:15.04	9
Momoka Muraoka	LW10–2	Women's super-G, sitting	—N/a				1:24.14	2nd place, silver medalist(s)
Momoka Muraoka	LW10–2	Women's giant slalom, sitting	1:15.66	2	1:16.26	2	2:31.92	2nd place, silver medalist(s)
Momoka Muraoka	LW10–2	Women's slalom, sitting						
Momoka Muraoka	LW10–2	Women's super combined, sitting	1:29.44	4	53.22	5	2:22.66	5

== Para biathlon ==
Athlete	Class	Event	Qualification			Final		
Athlete	Class	Event	Missed shots	Time	Rank	Missed shots	Time	Rank
Ryohei Ariyasu; Guide: Yuhei Fujita	NS3	Men's individual, visually impaired	—N/a			3 (1+0+1+1)	42:11.5	11
Ryohei Ariyasu; Guide: Yuhei Fujita	NS3	Men's sprint, visually impaired	—N/a			1 (1+0)	22:47.7	15
Takaharu Minamoto	LW12	Men's individual, sitting	—N/a			5 (3+1+0+1)	43:59.5	19
Takaharu Minamoto	LW12	Men's sprint, sitting	—N/a			6 (5+1)	25:27.3	24
Takaharu Minamoto	LW12	Men's sprint pursuit, sitting						
Keiichi Sato	LW8	Men's individual, standing	—N/a			10 (2+3+4+1)	44:28.2	18
Keiichi Sato	LW8	Men's sprint, standing	—N/a			4 (2+2)	21:55.3	18
Keiichi Sato	LW8	Men's sprint pursuit, standing						
Yurika Abe	LW6	Women's sprint, standing	—N/a			7 (4+3)	26:40.1	11
Yurika Abe	LW6	Women's sprint pursuit, standing						

== Para cross-country skiing ==
Men

Athlete	Class	Event	Qualification		Semifinal		Final	
Athlete	Class	Event	Time	Rank	Time	Rank	Time	Rank
Ryohei Ariyasu; Guide: Yuhei Fujita	NS3	Sprint classical, visually impaired						
Ryohei Ariyasu; Guide: Yuhei Fujita	NS3	10 km classical, visually impaired	—N/a					
Ryohei Ariyasu; Guide: Yuhei Fujita	NS3	20 km freestyle, visually impaired	—N/a					
Keigo Iwamoto	LW3	Sprint classical, standing						
Keigo Iwamoto	LW3	10 km classical, standing	—N/a					
Keigo Iwamoto	LW3	20 km freestyle, standing	—N/a					
Taiki Kawayoke	LW5/7	Sprint classical, standing						
Taiki Kawayoke	LW5/7	10 km classical, standing	—N/a					
Taiki Kawayoke	LW5/7	20 km freestyle, standing	—N/a					
Takaharu Minamoto	LW12	Sprint, sitting						
Takaharu Minamoto	LW12	10 km, sitting	—N/a					
Takaharu Minamoto	LW12	20 km, sitting	—N/a					
Hiroaki Mori	LW12	Sprint, sitting						
Hiroaki Mori	LW12	10 km, sitting	—N/a					
Yoshihiro Nitta	LW8	Sprint classical, standing						
Yoshihiro Nitta	LW8	10 km classical, standing	—N/a					
Yoshihiro Nitta	LW8	20 km freestyle, standing	—N/a					
Keiichi Sato	LW8	Sprint classical, standing						
Keiichi Sato	LW8	10 km classical, standing	—N/a					
Keiichi Sato	LW8	20 km freestyle, standing	—N/a					

Women

Athlete	Class	Event	Qualification		Semifinal		Final	
Athlete	Class	Event	Time	Rank	Time	Rank	Time	Rank
Yurika Abe	LW6	Sprint classical, standing						
Yurika Abe	LW6	10 km classical, standing	—N/a					
Momoko Dekijima	LW6	10 km classical, standing	—N/a					
Momoko Dekijima	LW6	20 km freestyle, standing	—N/a					
Mika Iwamoto	LW8	Sprint classical, standing						
Mika Iwamoto	LW8	10 km classical, standing	—N/a					
Mika Iwamoto	LW8	20 km freestyle, standing	—N/a					
Kotoha Matsudo; Guide: Yuji Shimada	NS3	Sprint classical, visually impaired						
Kotoha Matsudo; Guide: Yuji Shimada	NS3	10 km classical, visually impaired	—N/a					
Kotoha Matsudo; Guide: Yuji Shimada	NS3	20 km freestyle, visually impaired	—N/a					
Nana Sato	LW10.5	Sprint, sitting						
Nana Sato	LW10.5	10 km, sitting	—N/a					

Relay

Athletes	Event	Time	Rank
	4 × 2.5km mixed relay		
	4 × 2.5km open relay		

== Para ice hockey ==
Summary

Key:

- OT – Overtime
- GWS – Match decided by penalty-shootout

Team	Event	Group stage				Semifinal / Cl.	Final / BM / Pl.	
Team	Event	Opposition Score	Opposition Score	Opposition Score	Rank	Opposition Score	Opposition Score	Rank
Japan	Mixed tournament	Czech Republic; L 2–3	Canada; L 0–14	Slovakia; L 1–5	4	Italy; L 0–5	Slovakia; L 0–1	8

Roster

Head coach: Kojin Nakakita

- Akari Fukunishi
- Wataru Horie
- Yudai Ishikawa
- Itsuki Ito
- Mikio Kaneko
- Yusei Kawahara
- Masaharu Kumagai
- Masahiro Matsushita
- Eiji Misawa
- Amu Morisaki
- Shunsuke Nakamura
- Norihiko Nasu
- Kazuyoshi Niitsu
- Manabu Okabe
- Yoshihiro Shioya
- Satoru Sudo
- Shosei Ukai
- Mamoru Yoshikawa

Group play

Pos	Team	Pld	W	OTW	OTL	L	GF	GA	GD	Pts	Qualification
1	Canada	3	3	0	0	0	26	1	+25	9	Semifinals
2	Czechia	3	2	0	0	1	12	7	+5	6	Semifinals
3	Slovakia	3	1	0	0	2	6	17	−11	3	5–8th place semifinals
4	Japan	3	0	0	0	3	3	22	−19	0	5–8th place semifinals

Source: Milano Cortina 2026

7 March 2026; 10:05	Czechia	3–2 (2–1, 1–1, 0–0)	Japan	PalaItalia, Milan; Attendance: 2,083

Game reference

Patrik Sedláček
Goalies
Wataru Horie
Referee:
(United States) Bobby Esposito
Linesmen:
(Canada) Dylan Dauphinee
(Serbia) Tibor Fazekas

	0–1	06:14 – Niitsu (Ukai, Ito)
Zelinka (Hábl) – 08:54	1–1
Geier (Zelinka, Veselý) – 11:04	2–1
	2–2	20:09 – Ito (Matsushita)
Kapko (Geier) (PP) – 23:37	3–2

8 min
Penalties
10 min
30
Shots
4

9 March 2026; 20:35	Japan	0–14 (0–6, 0–3, 0–5)	Canada	PalaItalia, Milan; Attendance: 3,040

Game reference

Wataru Horie
Goalies
Adam Kingsmill
Referee:
(Czech Republic) Jan Vaněk
Linesmen:
(Serbia) Tibor Fazekas
(United States) Brendan Lewis

0–1	00:39 – McGregor (Jacobs-Webb, Halbert)
0–2	03:45 – McGregor (Jacobs-Webb, Lavin)
0–3	07:25 – Cozzolino (Armstrong)
0–4	11:46 – Cozzolino (Boily)
0–5	12:21 – Halbert (Jacobs-Webb, McGregor)
0–6	13:53 – Dixon (Hickey, McGregor) (PP)
0–7	23:44 – Boily (Halbert, Armstrong) (PP)
0–8	24:30 – Halbert (Lelièvre)
0–9	29:53 – Cozzolino (Hickey)
0–10	35:44 – Dunn (Boily, Cozzolino)
0–11	37:12 – Hickey (McGregor, Halbert)
0–12	39:44 – Halbert (Jacobs-Webb)
0–13	40:57 – Dunn (Boily, Armstrong)
0–14	42:45 – Halbert (Lelièvre)

12 min
Penalties
2 min
2
Shots
56

10 March 2026; 20:35	Slovakia	5–1 (0–1, 2–0, 3–0)	Japan	PalaItalia, Milan; Attendance: 2,223

Game reference

Eduard Lepáček
Goalies
Wataru Horie
Referee:
(Canada) Matthew Fergenbaum
Linesmen:
(Serbia) Tibor Fazekas
(Finland) Lari Niittylä

	0–1	05:21 – Ito (Niitsu, Ukai)
Joppa (Ligda) – 24:04	1–1
Korman (Joppa, Ferenčík) – 29:19	2–1
Joppa (Korman) – 40:45	3–1
Hlinka (Joppa, Korman) – 41:19	4–1
Večerek (Turic) – 44:41	5–1

2 min
Penalties
0 min
29
Shots
10

5–8th place semifinal

12 March 2026; 19:05	Italy	5–0 (1–0, 3–0, 1–0)	Japan	PalaItalia, Milan; Attendance: 3,634

Game reference

Santino Stillitano
Goalies
Wataru Horie
Referee:
(Canada) Kevin Webinger
Linesmen:
(Czech Republic) Pavel Blažek
(Finland) Lari Niittylä

Landeros (Larch, Rosa) (PP) – 06:32	1–0
Landeros (Macri, Larch) – 19:37	2–0
Radice (Rosa) – 26:28	3–0
Kalegaris (Depaoli) – 28:01	4–0
Landeros (Torella) – 44:33	5–0

6 min
Penalties
10 min
29
Shots
13

Seventh place game

14 March 2026; 12:05	Slovakia	1–0 (0–0, 0–0, 1–0)	Japan	PalaItalia, Milan; Attendance: 2,916

Game reference
Eduard Lepáček	Goalies	Wataru Horie	Referee: (United States) Bobby Esposito; Linesmen: (Czech Republic) Pavel Blažek (Finland) Lari Niittylä
Joppa – 43:29 / 1–0			Referee: (United States) Bobby Esposito; Linesmen: (Czech Republic) Pavel Blažek (Finland) Lari Niittylä
6 min	Penalties	6 min	Referee: (United States) Bobby Esposito; Linesmen: (Czech Republic) Pavel Blažek (Finland) Lari Niittylä
19	Shots	8	Referee: (United States) Bobby Esposito; Linesmen: (Czech Republic) Pavel Blažek (Finland) Lari Niittylä

== Para snowboard ==
Banked slalom
Men

Athlete	Event	Run 1	Run 2	Best	Rank
Takahito Ichikawa	Men's banked slalom, SB-LL2				
Junta Kosuda	Men's banked slalom, SB-LL1				
Daichi Oguri	Men's banked slalom, SB-LL1				
Masataka Oiwane	Men's banked slalom, SB-UL				
Keiji Okamoto	Men's banked slalom, SB-LL2				
Fubuki Ushiroda	Men's banked slalom, SB-LL2				

Women

Athlete	Event	Run 1	Run 2	Best	Rank
Eri Sakashita	Women's banked slalom, SB-LL2				

Snowboard cross

Men

Athlete	Event	Seeding		Pre-heats	Quarterfinal	Semifinal	Final	
Athlete	Event	Time	Rank	Position	Position	Position	Position	Rank
Takahito Ichikawa	Men's snowboard cross, SB-LL2	51.71	5	—N/a	4	Did not advance		
Junta Kosuda	Men's snowboard cross, SB-LL1	53.36	3	—N/a	1 Q	1 Q	RAL	4
Daichi Oguri	Men's snowboard cross, SB-LL1	53.85	6	—N/a	2 Q	3 SF	3	7
Masataka Oiwane	Men's snowboard cross, SB-UL	53.51	9	Bye	4	Did not advance		
Keiji Okamoto	Men's snowboard cross, SB-LL2	53.26	11	—N/a	3	Did not advance		
Fubuki Ushiroda	Men's snowboard cross, SB-LL2	56.24	15	—N/a	4	Did not advance		

Women

Athlete	Event	Seeding		Pre-heats	Semifinal	Final	
Athlete	Event	Time	Rank	Position	Position	Position	Rank
Eri Sakashita	Women's snowboard cross, SB-LL2	1:01.48	7	1 Q	DSQ SF	4	8

== Wheelchair curling ==
Summary

Team	Event	Group stage								Semifinal	Final / BM	
Team	Event	Opposition Score	Opposition Score	Opposition Score	Opposition Score	Opposition Score	Opposition Score	Opposition Score	Rank	Opposition Score	Opposition Score	Rank
Aki Ogawa; Yoji Nakajima	Mixed doubles	CHN; L 3–10	USA; W 7–5	KOR; L 0–9	ITA; W 6–5	GBR; L 2–11	EST; W 8–3	LAT; L 4–10	6	Did not advance		

=== Mixed doubles ===
Final Round Robin Standings
Team	Athletes	Pld	W	L	W–L	PF	PA	EW	EL	BE	SE	S%	DSC	Qualification
China	Wang Meng / Yang Jinqiao	7	6	1	–	66	32	32	21	0	14	64.9%	106.033	Playoffs
United States	Laura Dwyer / Stephen Emt	7	4	3	1–1	43	43	25	27	0	9	53.4%	89.717	Playoffs
South Korea	Baek Hye-jin / Lee Yong-suk	7	4	3	1–1	58	26	30	19	0	17	59.9%	142.058	Playoffs
Latvia	Poļina Rožkova / Agris Lasmans	7	4	3	1–1	46	45	28	25	0	12	48.5%	150.675	Playoffs
Great Britain	Jo Butterfield / Jason Kean	7	3	4	1–0	47	56	25	29	0	8	51.5%	95.075	
Japan	Aki Ogawa / Yoji Nakajima	7	3	4	0–1	30	53	19	30	0	8	49.0%	88.067	
Estonia	Katlin Riidebach / Ain Villau	7	2	5	1–0	31	58	22	28	0	9	47.6%	98.233	
Italy	Orietta Bertò / Paolo Ioriatti	7	2	5	0–1	43	51	28	30	0	11	55.6%	73.700	

Source: Official website

Round robin

Draw 1
Wednesday, March 4, 19:05

Sheet B	1	2	3	4	5	6	7	8	Final
Japan (Ogawa / Nakajima) 🔨	1	1	0	1	0	0	0	X	3
China (Wang / Yang)	0	0	4	0	2	3	1	X	10

Draw 2
Thursday, March 5, 10:05

Sheet C	1	2	3	4	5	6	7	8	Final
Japan (Ogawa / Nakajima) 🔨	1	0	2	1	2	0	1	X	7
United States (Dwyer / Emt)	0	1	0	0	0	4	0	X	5

Draw 3
Thursday, March 5, 19:05

Sheet B	1	2	3	4	5	6	7	8	Final
South Korea (Baek / Lee)	1	1	2	2	2	1	X	X	9
Japan (Ogawa / Nakajima) 🔨	0	0	0	0	0	0	X	X	0

Draw 4
Friday, March 6, 9:05

Sheet A	1	2	3	4	5	6	7	8	Final
Japan (Ogawa / Nakajima) 🔨	2	2	1	0	0	0	0	1	6
Italy (Bertò / Ioriatti)	0	0	0	1	1	1	2	0	5

Draw 5
Saturday, March 7, 14:35

Sheet D	1	2	3	4	5	6	7	8	Final
Japan (Ogawa / Nakajima)	0	0	0	0	0	2	0	X	2
Great Britain (Butterfield / Kean) 🔨	2	2	1	1	2	0	3	X	11

Draw 6
Sunday, March 8, 14:35

Sheet C	1	2	3	4	5	6	7	8	Final
Estonia (Riidebach / Villau) 🔨	1	1	1	0	0	0	0	X	3
Japan (Ogawa / Nakajima)	0	0	0	3	1	1	3	X	8

Draw 7
Monday, March 9, 14:35

Sheet A	1	2	3	4	5	6	7	8	Final
Latvia (Rožkova / Lasmans)	2	1	2	0	4	0	1	X	10
Japan (Ogawa / Nakajima) 🔨	0	0	0	2	0	2	0	X	4

== See also ==
- Japan at the Paralympics
- Japan at the 2026 Winter Olympics
