= Para biathlon at the 2026 Winter Paralympics – Men's sprint pursuit =

Men's pursuit at the XIV Paralympic Winter Games
- Paralympic biathlon
- Venue: Tesero Cross-Country Skiing Stadium.
- Dates: 13 March

Men's pursuit (visually impaired) at the XIV Paralympic Winter Games

Medalists
1st place, gold medalist(s)		Yu Shuang; Guide:Shang Jincai	China
2nd place, silver medalist(s)		Oleksandr Kazik; Guide: Serhii Kucheriavyi	Ukraine
3rd place, bronze medalist(s)		Anatolii Kovalevskyi; Guide: Oleksandr Mukshyn	Ukraine

Men's pursuit (standing) at the XIV Paralympic Winter Games

Medalists
1st place, gold medalist(s)		Cai Jiayun	China
2nd place, silver medalist(s)		Grygorii Vovchynskyi	Ukraine
3rd place, bronze medalist(s)		Marco Maier	Germany

Men's pursuit (sitting) at the XIV Paralympic Winter Games

Medalists
1st place, gold medalist(s)		Yerbol Khamitov	Kazakhstan
2nd place, silver medalist(s)		Taras Rad	Ukraine
3rd place, bronze medalist(s)		Liu Zixu	China

The men's pursuit competition of the 2026 Winter Paralympics will take place on 13 March 2026 at the Tesero Cross-Country Skiing Stadium.

== Medal table ==
* Host nation (Italy)

Rank	Nation	Gold	Silver	Bronze	Total
1	China (CHN)	2	0	1	3
2	Kazakhstan (KAZ)	1	0	0	1
3	Ukraine (UKR)	0	3	1	4
4	Germany (GER)	0	0	1	1
Totals (4 entries)		3	3	3	9

== Visually impaired ==
In the biathlon visually impaired, the athlete with a visual impairement has a sighted guide. The two skiers are considered a team, and dual medals are awarded.

Ranking	Name	Country	Qualification			Final		
Ranking	Name	Country	Misses	Time	Difference	Misses	Time	Difference
1st place, gold medalist(s)	Yu Shuang; Guide:Shang Jincai	China	1	10:27.0	+12.9	0	11:39.2	0
2nd place, silver medalist(s)	Oleksandr Kazik; Guide:Serhii Kucheriavyi	Ukraine	1	10:14.1	+0	1	11:53.0	+13.8
3rd place, bronze medalist(s)	Anatolii Kovalevskyi; Guide:Oleksandr Mukshyn	Ukraine	0	10:26.7	+12.6	0	12:13.7	+34.5
4	Matthis Volkert Lennart; Guide:Nils Kolb	Germany	1	10:53.4	+39.6	1	12:51.5	+1:12.3
5	Iaroslav Reshetynskyi; Guide:Dmytro Drahan	Ukraine	0	10:44.5	+30.4	1	13:07.0	+1:27.8
6	Ihor Kravchuk; Guide:Andriy Dotsenko	Ukraine	0	10:53.4	+39.3	2	13:12.7	+1:33.5
7	Dang Hesong; Guide:Lu Hongda	China	1	11:03	+49.2	3	13:28.2	+1:49.0
8	Blazej Bienko; Guide:Michal Landa	Poland	0	11:48.0	+1:33.9	1	15:16.7	+3:37.5
9	Anthony Chalencon; Guide:Florian Michelon	France	4	12:18.9	+2:04.8	4	15:53.0	+4:13.8
10	Pawel Gil; Guide:Radowslav Koszyk	Poland	3	12:40.8	+2:26.7	3	16:14.7	+4:35.5
11	Kim Minyeong; Guide:Byeon Juyeong	South Korea	3	13:06.3	+2:52.2	4	18:11.5	+6:32.2
12	Dmytro Suiarko; Guide:Oleksandr Nikonovych	Ukraine	2	11:36.7	+1:22.6	DNS		
13	Nico Messinger; Guide:Robin Wunderle	Germany	5	12:30	+2:16.3	DNS		
14	Alex Lajtman; Guide:Marko Havran	Slovakia	0	13:48.0	+3:33.9	DNQ		
15	Theo Bold; Guide:Jakob Bold	Germany	DNS					

== Standing ==
Ranking	Name	Country	Qualification			Final		
Ranking	Name	Country	Misses	Time	Difference	Misses	Time	Difference
1st place, gold medalist(s)	Cai Jiayun	China	1	9:58.1	+4.6	0	10:33.4	0
2nd place, silver medalist(s)	Grygorii Vovchynskyi	Ukraine	2	10:01.5	+8.0	0	10:33.6	+0.2
3rd place, bronze medalist(s)	Marco Maier	Germany	0	9:53.5	+0.0	3	11:08.5	+35.1
4	Mark Arendez	Canada	1	10:14.6	+21.1	1	11:08.5	+39.6
5	Serafym Drahun	Ukraine	2	10:26.9	+33.4	4	12:02.9	+1:29.5
6	Benjamin Daviet	France	0	10:17.5	+24.0	2	12:05.0	+1:31.6
7	Liu Yiaobun	China	2	10:27.9	+34.4	4	12:13.2	+1:39.8
8	Wu Junbao	China	0	10:10.7	+17.2	4	12:26.1	+1:52.7
9	Alexandr Gerlitz	Kazakhstan	4	10:53.3	+59.8	2	12:30.4	+1:57.0
10	Dmytro Sereda	Ukraine	4	11:24.1	+1:30.6	0	12:45.2	+2:11.8
11	Karl Tabouret	France	2	10:27.9	+40.7	4	12:55.8	+2:22.4
12	Sato Keiichi	Japan	0	10:59.8	+1:06.3	2	13:40.0	+3:06.6
13	Christian Toninelli	Italy	1	11:20.1	+1:26.6	2	14:01.9	+3:28.5
14	Yuan Mingshou	China	4	11:31.7	+1:38.2	3	14:20.9	+3:47.5
15	Stefan Egger-Riedmueller	Austria	2	11:48	+1:54.6	1	14:21.2	+3:47.8
16	Luca Tarasci	Switzerland	4	12:40.4	+2:46.9	3	16:10.1	+5:36.7
17	Serhii Romaniuk	Ukraine	1	10:45.6	+10:45.6	DNS		
18	Steffen Lehmker	Germany	7	12:46.0	+2:52.5	DNS		
19	Alexander Ehler	Germany	DNS					

== Sitting ==
Ranking	Name	Country	Qualification			Final		
Ranking	Name	Country	Misses	Time	Difference	Misses	Time	Difference
1st place, gold medalist(s)	Yerbol Khamitov	Kazakhstan	0	8:27.9	0	1	9:39.0	0
2nd place, silver medalist(s)	Taras Rad	Ukraine	0	8:39.7	+11.8	1	10:00.5	+21.5
3rd place, bronze medalist(s)	Liu Zixu	China	0	8:37.7	+9.8	2	10:11.5	+32.5
4	Liu Mengtao	China	2	9:04.6	+36.7	1	10:18.3	+39.2
5	Aaron Pike	United States	1	9:01.3	+33.4	0	10:18.8	+39.8
6	Joshua Sweeney	United States	0	9:00.2	+32.3	1	10:42.5	+1:03.5
7	Wang Tao	China	0	9:00.9	+33.0	1	10:51.2	+1:12.2
8	Vasyl Krarchuk	Ukraine	0	8:50.5	+22.6	2	10:55.3	+1:16.3
9	Hryhorii Shymko	Ukraine	2	9:05.7	+37.8	1	10:58.8	+1:19.8
10	Shin Eui Hyun	South Korea	0	9:06.8	+38.9	2	11:16.9	+1:37.9
11	Mao Zhongwu	China	4	9:44.7	+1:16.8	2	11:17.6	+1:38.6
12	Pavlo Bal	Ukraine	0	9:02.9	+35.0	3	11:57.5	+2:18.5
13	Aleksyk Oleksander	Ukraine	1	9:23.8	+55.9	3	11:59.6	+2:20.6
14	Scott Meenagh	Great Britain	1	9:33.6	+1:05.7	2	12:09.0	+2:30.0
15	Guilherme Rocha	Brazil	1	9:57.7	+1:29.8	2	12:55.9	+3:16.9
16	Higino Rivero Fernandez	Spain	0	9:32.8	+1:04.9	3	13:08.9	+3:29.9
17	Won Yoomin	South Korea	3	10:37.0	+2:09.1	0	13:09.1	+3:30.1
18	Marco Pisani	Italy	0	9:50.2	+1:22.3	2	13:09.3	+3:30.3
19	Yuriy Berezin	Kazakhstan	0	9:49.9	+1:22.0	2	13:09.4	+3:30.4
20	Derek Zaplotinsky	Canada	2	9:33.1	+1:05.2	5	13:40.0	+4:01.0
21	Robelson Lula	Brazil	4	10:54.7	+2:26.8	2	13:56.6	+4:17.6
22	Minomoto Takaharu	Japan	3	10:29.4	+2:01.5	3	14:00.8	+4:21.8
23	Sergey Ussoltsev	Kazakhstan	0	10:00.0	+1:32.1	5	14:22.9	+4:43.9
24	Jeong Jaeseok	South Korea	3	10:28.1	+2:00.2	6	15:43.1	+6:04.1
25	Dave Miln	Australia	4	11:57.7	+3:29.8	DNQ		
26	Alejandro Lorenzo Omar	Argentina	5	12:46.0	+4:18.1	DNQ		
27	Matthew Brumby	Australia	2	12:57.9	+4:30.0	DNQ		
28	Michael Kneeland	United States	DNF					

== See also ==
- Biathlon at the 2026 Winter Olympics
