= Slovakia at the 2026 Winter Paralympics =

- Flag of Slovakia
- IPC code: SVK

in Milan & Cortina d'Ampezzo, Italy 6 March 2026 – 15 March 2026
- Flag bearer: Miroslav Haraus
- Medals Ranked 26th: Gold 0 Silver 0 Bronze 3 Total 3

Winter Paralympics appearances (overview)
- 1994; 1998; 2002; 2006; 2010; 2014; 2018; 2022; 2026

Other related appearances
- Czechoslovakia (1976–1992)

Slovakia was represented at the 2026 Winter Paralympics in Milan & Cortina d'Ampezzo, Italy, which took place between 6–15 March 2026.

== Medalists ==
The following Slovakia competitors won medals at the games. In the discipline sections below, the medalists' names are bolded.

Medal	Name	Sport	Event	Date
Bronze	Alexandra Rexová; Guide: Sophia Polak	Para alpine skiing	Women's downhill, visually impaired	7 March
Bronze	Alexandra Rexová; Guide: Sophia Polak	Para alpine skiing	Women's super-G, visually impaired	9 March
Bronze	Alexandra Rexová; Guide: Matúš Ďuriš	Para alpine skiing	Women's slalom, visually impaired	14 March

Medals by sport
**Sport**	1st place, gold medalist(s)	2nd place, silver medalist(s)	3rd place, bronze medalist(s)	**Total**
Para alpine skiing	0	0	3	**3**
Total	0	0	3	3

Medals by gender
**Gender**	1st place, gold medalist(s)	2nd place, silver medalist(s)	3rd place, bronze medalist(s)	**Total**
Female	0	0	3	**3**
Male	0	0	0	**0**
Mixed	0	0	0	**0**
**Total**	0	0	3	3

Medals by date
**Day**	**Date**	1st place, gold medalist(s)	2nd place, silver medalist(s)	3rd place, bronze medalist(s)	Total
Day 1	7 March	0	0	1	1
Day 2	8 March	0	0	0	0
Day 3	9 March	0	0	1	1
Day 4	10 March	0	0	0	0
Day 5	11 March	0	0	0	0
Day 6	12 March	0	0	0	0
Day 7	13 March	0	0	0	0
Day 8	14 March	0	0	1	1
Total		0	0	3	3

== Competitors ==
The following is the list of number of competitors participating at the Games per sport/discipline.

Sport	Men	Women	Total
Para alpine skiing	3	2	5
Para biathlon	1	0	1
Para cross-country skiing	1	0	1
Para ice hockey	14	1	15
Para snowboard	1	0	1
Wheelchair curling	4	1	5
Total	23	4	27

== Alpine skiing ==
Slovakia is competing in alpine skiing.

Men

Athlete	Event	Run 1		Run 2		Final/Total	
Athlete	Event	Time	Rank	Time	Rank	Time	Rank
Miroslav Haraus; Guide: Maroš Hudík	Downhill, visually impaired	—N/a				DNF	
Miroslav Haraus; Guide: Maroš Hudík	Super-G, visually impaired	—N/a				DNF	
Miroslav Haraus; Guide: Maroš Hudík	Combined, visually impaired	1:18.83	6	52.54	11	2:11.37	8
Miroslav Haraus; Guide: Maroš Hudík	Giant slalom, visually impaired	DNF					
Miroslav Haraus; Guide: Maroš Hudík	Slalom, visually impaired	DNF					
Marek Kubačka; Guide: Mária Zaťovičová	Super-G, visually impaired	—N/a				DNF	
Marek Kubačka; Guide: Mária Zaťovičová	Combined, visually impaired	DNS					
Marek Kubačka; Guide: Mária Zaťovičová	Giant slalom, visually impaired	1:12.23	9	1:11.41	8	2:23.64	8
Marek Kubačka; Guide: Mária Zaťovičová	Slalom, visually impaired	55.69	11	51.12	11	1:46.81	11
Martin Čupka	Downhill, standing	—N/a				DNF	
Martin Čupka	Super-G, standing	—N/a				1:22.21	24
Martin Čupka	Combined, standing	1:22.82	15	55.20	15	2:18.02	15
Martin Čupka	Giant slalom, standing	1:18.04	25	1:18.43	24	2:36.47	24
Martin Čupka	Slalom, standing	1:01.88	24	58.19	21	2:00.07	21

Women

Athlete	Event	Run 1		Run 2		Final/Total		
Athlete	Event	Time	Rank	Time	Rank	Time	Diff	Rank
Alexandra Rexová; Guide: Sophia Polák	Downhill, visually impaired	—N/a				1:27.45	+4.90	3rd place, bronze medalist(s)
Alexandra Rexová; Guide: Sophia Polák	Super-G, visually impaired	—N/a				1:19.69	+4.85	3rd place, bronze medalist(s)
Alexandra Rexová; Guide: Sophia Polák	Combined, visually impaired	1:22.27	4	46.98	3	2:09.25	+7.50	4
Alexandra Rexová; Guide: Matúš Ďuriš	Giant slalom, visually impaired	1:14.59	5	1:15.88	4	2:30.47	+11.84	4
Alexandra Rexová; Guide: Matúš Ďuriš	Slalom, visually impaired	45.98	4	45.99	3	1:31.97	+9.24	3rd place, bronze medalist(s)
Viktória Balážová; Guide: Alica Jakubeková	Giant slalom, visually impaired	DNF						
Viktória Balážová; Guide: Alica Jakubeková	Slalom, visually impaired	DNF						

== Para biathlon ==
Men
Individual

Athlete	Event	Classification	Factor	Time	Misses	Factored time	Rank
Alex Lajtman; Guide: Marko Havran	Individual, visually impaired	NS3	100%	39:47.2	6	45:47.2	13

Sprint

Athlete	Event	Classification	Factor	Time	Misses	Factored time	Rank
Alex Lajtman; Guide: Marko Havran	Sprint, visually impaired	NS3	100%	25:53.1	5 (3+2)	25:53.1	17

== Para cross-country skiing ==
=== Men ===
Athlete	Class	Event	Qualification		Semifinal		Final	
Athlete	Class	Event	Time	Rank	Time	Rank	Time	Rank
Alex Lajtman; Guide: Marko Havran	NS3	Men's sprint classical, visually impaired	3:51.71	16	Did not advance			
Alex Lajtman; Guide: Marko Havran	NS3	Men's 10 km classical, visually impaired	—N/a				40:09.8	15
Alex Lajtman; Guide: Marko Havran	NS3	Men's 20 km freestyle, visually impaired	—N/a				52:38.0	15

== Para ice hockey ==
Summary

Team	Event	Preliminary round				Semifinal / Cl.	Final / BM / Pl.	
Team	Event	Opposition Result	Opposition Result	Opposition Result	Rank	Opposition Result	Opposition Result	Rank
Slovakia	Mixed tournament	Canada; L 0–8	Czech Republic; L 1–8	Japan; W 5–1	3	Germany; L 3–4 (OT)	Japan; W 1–0	7

Group play

Pos	Team	Pld	W	OTW	OTL	L	GF	GA	GD	Pts	Qualification
1	Canada	3	3	0	0	0	26	1	+25	9	Semifinals
2	Czechia	3	2	0	0	1	12	7	+5	6	Semifinals
3	Slovakia	3	1	0	0	2	6	17	−11	3	5–8th place semifinals
4	Japan	3	0	0	0	3	3	22	−19	0	5–8th place semifinals

Source: Milano Cortina 2026

7 March 2026; 20:35	Canada	8–0 (4–0, 1–0, 3–0)	Slovakia	PalaItalia, Milan; Attendance: 4,438

Game reference

Corbin Watson
Goalies
Eduard Lepáček
Referee:
(Canada) Kevin Webinger
Linesmen:
(Czech Republic) Pavel Blažek
(Sweden) Tony Rundström

Dunn (Cozzolino, Boily) – 06:46	1–0
Halbert – 09:20	2–0
McGregor (Hickey, Jacobs-Webb) – 10:11	3–0
Boily (Lavin) – 11:42	4–0
Hickey (McGregor) – 20:29	5–0
Dunn – 35:06	6–0
Boily (Armstrong, Dunn) – 38:55	7–0
Cozzolino (Hickey) (PP) – 42:31	8–0

2 min
Penalties
4 min
51
Shots
2

9 March 2026; 13:35	Czechia	8–1 (2–0, 4–0, 2–1)	Slovakia	PalaItalia, Milan; Attendance: 2,285

Game reference

Martin Kudela
Goalies
Eduard Lepáček
Referee:
(Canada) Patrick Myers
Linesmen:
(Norway) Marius Hermansen Oswold
(Sweden) Andreas Lunden

Veselý – 04:50	1–0
Žižlavský (Ohar) – 12:40	2–0
Žižlavský (Doležal, Zelinka) – 16:10	3–0
Veselý (Hečko, Žižlavský) – 20:05	4–0
Zelinka (Hečko, Veselý) – 23:15	5–0
Doležal (Veselý) – 26:39	6–0
	6–1	32:43 – Korman (Joppa, Ferenčík)
Zelinka (Pátek) – 35:59	7–1
Geier – 36:10	8–1

4 min
Penalties
4 min
30
Shots
9

10 March 2026; 20:35	Slovakia	5–1 (0–1, 2–0, 3–0)	Japan	PalaItalia, Milan; Attendance: 2,223

Game reference

Eduard Lepáček
Goalies
Wataru Horie
Referee:
(Canada) Matthew Fergenbaum
Linesmen:
(Serbia) Tibor Fazekas
(Finland) Lari Niittylä

	0–1	05:21 – Ito (Niitsu, Ukai)
Joppa (Ligda) – 24:04	1–1
Korman (Joppa, Ferenčík) – 29:19	2–1
Joppa (Korman) – 40:45	3–1
Hlinka (Joppa, Korman) – 41:19	4–1
Večerek (Turic) – 44:41	5–1

2 min
Penalties
0 min
29
Shots
10

5–8th place semifinal

12 March 2026; 14:35	Slovakia	3–4 OT (1–2, 2–0, 0–1) (OT: 0–1)	Germany	PalaItalia, Milan; Attendance: 3,376

Game reference

Eduard Lepáček
Goalies
Veit Mühlhans
Referee:
(Czech Republic) Jan Vaněk
Linesmen:
(United States) Brendan Lewis
(Italy) Alexander Wiest

	0–1	01:20 – Schrader (Stumpe)
	0–2	08:07 – Schrader
Ferenčík (Joppa, Ligda) – 12:02	1–2
Večerek – 15:38	2–2
Joppa (Korman, Ligda) – 28:56	3–2
	3–3	41:11 – Schrader (Brelage, Disveld)
	3–4	51:04 – Schrader

0 min
Penalties
18 min
25
Shots
14

Seventh place game

14 March 2026; 12:05	Slovakia	1–0 (0–0, 0–0, 1–0)	Japan	PalaItalia, Milan; Attendance: 2,916

Game reference
Eduard Lepáček	Goalies	Wataru Horie	Referee: (United States) Bobby Esposito; Linesmen: (Czech Republic) Pavel Blažek (Finland) Lari Niittylä
Joppa – 43:29 / 1–0			Referee: (United States) Bobby Esposito; Linesmen: (Czech Republic) Pavel Blažek (Finland) Lari Niittylä
6 min	Penalties	6 min	Referee: (United States) Bobby Esposito; Linesmen: (Czech Republic) Pavel Blažek (Finland) Lari Niittylä
19	Shots	8	Referee: (United States) Bobby Esposito; Linesmen: (Czech Republic) Pavel Blažek (Finland) Lari Niittylä

== Para snowboard ==
Snowboard cross

Athlete	Event	Seeding				Quarterfinal	Semifinal	Final	
Athlete	Event	Run 1	Run 2	Best	Rank	Position	Position	Position	Rank
Adam Krupa	Men's snowboard cross, SB-UL	54.08	53.81	53.81	10 Q	2 Q	4 SF	DNF	7

== Wheelchair curling ==
Summary

Team	Event	Group stage										Semifinal	Final / BM	
Team	Event	Opposition Score	Opposition Score	Opposition Score	Opposition Score	Opposition Score	Opposition Score	Opposition Score	Opposition Score	Opposition Score	Rank	Opposition Score	Opposition Score	Rank
Peter Zaťko; Radoslav Ďuriš; Adrian Ďurček; Monika Kunkelová; Karol Sandl	Mixed team	GBR; W 9–2	LAT; L 0–9	NOR; W 6–4	ITA; L 0–10	KOR; L 5–7	USA; W 8–3	SWE; L 4–5	CAN; L 6–9	CHN; L 4–7	8	Did not advance		

=== Mixed tournament ===
Final Round Robin Standings
Team	Skip	Pld	W	L	W–L	PF	PA	EW	EL	BE	SE	S%	DSC	Qualification
Canada	Mark Ideson	9	9	0	–	71	36	36	26	2	19	68.2%	84.488	Playoffs
China	Wang Haitao	9	8	1	–	76	42	38	26	1	15	68.3%	83.350	Playoffs
Sweden	Viljo Petersson-Dahl	9	5	4	1–0	47	48	31	31	6	13	62.8%	98.125	Playoffs
South Korea	Yang Hui-tae	9	5	4	0–1	55	48	36	32	1	17	64.6%	90.525	Playoffs
Norway	Jostein Stordahl	9	4	5	1–0	41	55	28	31	2	12	58.3%	130.863	
Italy	Egidio Marchese	9	4	5	0–1	52	53	32	27	0	15	60.6%	107.831	
Latvia	Ojārs Briedis	9	3	6	2–0	45	67	27	33	0	12	50.2%	113.381	
Slovakia	Radoslav Ďuriš	9	3	6	1–1	42	56	26	37	1	13	51.9%	117.688	
United States	Sean O'Neill	9	3	6	0–2	54	52	34	32	0	14	58.3%	72.156	
Great Britain	Hugh Nibloe	9	1	8	–	40	66	26	39	0	7	55.7%	129.675	

Source: Official website

Round robin
Slovakia had a bye in draws 4, 7 and 11.

Draw 1
Saturday, March 7, 9:35

Sheet A	1	2	3	4	5	6	7	8	Final
Great Britain (Nibloe)	0	0	2	0	0	0	0	X	2
Slovakia (Ďuriš) 🔨	1	1	0	1	4	1	1	X	9

Draw 2
Saturday, March 7, 18:35

Sheet D	1	2	3	4	5	6	7	8	Final
Latvia (Briedis)	2	1	1	1	2	2	X	X	9
Slovakia (Ďuriš) 🔨	0	0	0	0	0	0	X	X	0

Draw 3
Sunday, March 8, 9:35

Sheet C	1	2	3	4	5	6	7	8	Final
Slovakia (Ďuriš)	0	0	0	0	0	0	2	4	6
Norway (Stordahl) 🔨	0	1	1	1	0	1	0	0	4

Draw 5
Monday, March 9, 9:35

Sheet D	1	2	3	4	5	6	7	8	Final
Slovakia (Ďuriš)	0	0	0	0	0	0	X	X	0
Italy (Marchese) 🔨	2	2	2	1	2	1	X	X	10

Draw 6
Monday, March 9, 18:35

Sheet B	1	2	3	4	5	6	7	8	Final
South Korea (Yang) 🔨	0	2	1	1	0	1	2	0	7
Slovakia (Ďuriš)	1	0	0	0	2	0	0	2	5

Draw 8
Tuesday, March 10, 18:35

Sheet A	1	2	3	4	5	6	7	8	Final
Slovakia (Ďuriš) 🔨	2	1	1	0	3	0	1	X	8
United States (O'Neill)	0	0	0	2	0	1	0	X	3

Draw 9
Wednesday, March 11, 9:05

Sheet C	1	2	3	4	5	6	7	8	Final
Sweden (Petersson-Dahl)	1	1	1	1	0	0	1	0	5
Slovakia (Ďuriš) 🔨	0	0	0	0	1	1	0	2	4

Draw 10
Wednesday, March 11, 20:05

Sheet B	1	2	3	4	5	6	7	8	Final
Slovakia (Ďuriš)	0	0	2	1	1	2	0	0	6
Canada (Ideson) 🔨	2	4	0	0	0	0	1	2	9

Draw 12
Thursday, March 12, 18:35

Sheet A	1	2	3	4	5	6	7	8	Final
China (Wang)	1	0	2	0	0	3	1	X	7
Slovakia (Ďuriš) 🔨	0	1	0	2	1	0	0	X	4

== See also ==
- Slovakia at the Paralympics
- Slovakia at the 2026 Winter Olympics
