= South Korea at the 2026 Winter Paralympics =

- Flag of South Korea
- IPC code: KOR
- NPC: Korean Paralympic Committee

in Milan & Cortina d'Ampezzo, Italy 6 March 2026 – 15 March 2026
- Competitors: 20 (14 men and 6 women) in 5 sports
- Flag bearers (opening): Kim Yun-ji & Lee Yong-suk
- Flag bearers (closing): Baek Hye-jin & Lee Je-hyuk
- Medals Ranked 13th: Gold 2 Silver 4 Bronze 1 Total 7

Winter Paralympics appearances (overview)
- 1992; 1994; 1998; 2002; 2006; 2010; 2014; 2018; 2022; 2026

South Korea will compete at the 2026 Winter Paralympics in Milan & Cortina d'Ampezzo, Italy, which will take place between 6–15 March 2026.

== Medallists ==
Medal	Name	Sport	Event	Date
Gold	Kim Yun-ji	Para biathlon	Women's individual, sitting	8 March
Gold	Kim Yun-ji	Para cross-country skiing	Women's 20 kilometre, sitting	15 March
Silver	Kim Yun-ji	Para cross-country skiing	Women's sprint, sitting	10 March
Silver	Kim Yun-ji	Para cross-country skiing	Women's 10 kilometres, sitting	11 March
Silver	Baek Hye-jin; Lee Yong-suk	Wheelchair curling	Mixed doubles	11 March
Silver	Kim Yun-ji	Para biathlon	Women's sprint pursuit, sitting	13 March
Bronze	Lee Je-hyuk	Para snowboard	Men's snowboard cross, SB-LL2	8 March

Medals by sport
Sport	1st place, gold medalist(s)	2nd place, silver medalist(s)	3rd place, bronze medalist(s)	Total
Para biathlon	1	1	0	2
Para snowboard	0	0	1	1
Para cross-country skiing	1	2	0	3
Wheelchair curling	0	1	0	1
Total	2	4	1	7

Medals by date
Day	Date	1st place, gold medalist(s)	2nd place, silver medalist(s)	3rd place, bronze medalist(s)	Total
Day 1	8 March	1	0	1	2
Day 2	9 March	0	0	0	0
Day 3	10 March	0	1	0	1
Day 4	11 March	0	2	0	2
Day 5	12 March	0	0	0	0
Day 6	13 March	0	1	0	1
Day 7	14 March	0	0	0	0
Day 8	15 March	1	0	0	1
Total		2	4	1	7

Medals by gender
Gender	1st place, gold medalist(s)	2nd place, silver medalist(s)	3rd place, bronze medalist(s)	Total
Female	2	3	0	5
Male	0	0	1	1
Mixed	0	1	0	1
Total	2	4	1	7

== Competitors ==
The following is the list of number of competitors participating at the Games per sport/discipline.

Sport	Men	Women	Total
Para alpine skiing	2	2	4
Para biathlon	4	2	6
Para cross-country skiing	4	2	6
Para snowboard	3	0	3
Wheelchair curling	5	2	7
Total	14	6	20

== Para alpine skiing ==
Athlete	Class	Event	Run 1		Run 2		Total	
Athlete	Class	Event	Time	Rank	Time	Rank	Time	Rank
Hwang Min-gyu; Guide: Kim Jun-hyeong	AS3	Men's downhill, visually impaired	—N/a				DNF	
Hwang Min-gyu; Guide: Kim Jun-hyeong	AS3	Men's super-G, visually impaired	—N/a				1:18.28	8
Hwang Min-gyu; Guide: Kim Jun-hyeong	AS3	Men's giant slalom, visually impaired	1:08.94	6	1:11.22	6	2:20.16	6
Hwang Min-gyu; Guide: Kim Jun-hyeong	AS3	Men's slalom, visually impaired	52.65	7	50.14	8	1:42.79	7
Hwang Min-gyu; Guide: Kim Jun-hyeong	AS3	Men's super combined, visually impaired	DNF					
Lee Hwan-kyung	LW12-2	Men's giant slalom, sitting	DNF					
Lee Hwan-kyung	LW12-2	Men's slalom, sitting	DNF					
Sara Choi; Guide: Eo Eun-mi	AS2	Women's downhill, visually impaired	—N/a				1:29.03	4
Sara Choi; Guide: Eo Eun-mi	AS2	Women's super-G, visually impaired	—N/a				1:21.17	5
Sara Choi; Guide: Eo Eun-mi	AS2	Women's giant slalom, visually impaired	1:19.10	9	1:19.68	7	2:38.78	7
Sara Choi; Guide: Eo Eun-mi	AS2	Women's slalom, visually impaired	48.65	7	47.92	5	1:36.57	7
Sara Choi; Guide: Eo Eun-mi	AS2	Women's super combined, visually impaired	1:22.89	5	50.97	7	2:13.86	6
Park Chae-yi	LW11	Women's giant slalom, sitting	1:32.32	13	1:34.08	10	3:06.40	10
Park Chae-yi	LW11	Women's slalom, sitting	DNF					

== Para biathlon ==
Athlete	Class	Event	Qualification			Final		
Athlete	Class	Event	Missed shots	Time	Rank	Missed shots	Time	Rank
Jeong Jae-seok	LW10.5	Men's individual, sitting	—N/a			10 (1+3+3+3)	47:16.2	25
Jeong Jae-seok	LW10.5	Men's sprint pursuit, sitting	3 (2+1)	10:28.1	21 Q	6 (4+2)	15:43.1	24
Kim Min-yeong; Guide: Byeon Ju-yeong	NS3	Sprint, visually impaired	—N/a			0 (0+0)	23:15.6	16
Kim Min-yeong; Guide: Byeon Ju-yeong	NS3	Sprint pursuit, visually impaired	3 (2+1)	13:06.3	13 Q	4 (3+1)	18:11.5	11
Sin Eui-hyun	LW12	Men's individual, sitting	—N/a			2 (0+1+1+0)	39:13.3	12
Sin Eui-hyun	LW12	Men's sprint, sitting	—N/a			0 (0+0)	21:08.4	10
Sin Eui-hyun	LW12	Men's sprint pursuit, sitting	0	9:06.8	11 Q	2 (0+2)	11:16.9	10
Won Yoo-min	LW11.5	Men's individual, sitting	—N/a			2 (0+2+0+0)	42:57.3	17
Won Yoo-min	LW11.5	Men's sprint, sitting	—N/a			1 (0+1)	24:28.4	22
Won Yoo-min	LW11.5	Men's sprint pursuit, sitting	3 (3+0)	10:37.0	23 Q	0	13:09.1	17
Han Seung-hee	LW10	Women's sprint, sitting	—N/a			0 (0+0)	25:43.7	12
Han Seung-hee	LW10	Women's sprint pursuit, sitting	2 (1+1)	11:33.7	10 Q	1 (0+1)	16:11.5	9
Kim Yun-ji	LW10.5	Women's individual, sitting	—N/a			2 (0+2+0+0)	38:00.1	1st place, gold medalist(s)
Kim Yun-ji	LW10.5	Women's sprint, sitting	—N/a			4 (4+0)	22:41.0	4
Kim Yun-ji	LW10.5	Women's sprint pursuit, sitting	1 (1+0)	9:29.8	2 Q	2 (0+2)	11:41.6	2nd place, silver medalist(s)

== Para cross-country skiing ==
Athlete	Class	Event	Qualification		Semifinal		Final	
Athlete	Class	Event	Time	Rank	Time	Rank	Time	Rank
Jeong Jae-seok	LW10.5	Men's sprint, sitting	2:25.78	22	Did not advance			
Jeong Jae-seok	LW10.5	Men's 10 km, sitting	—N/a				26:31.8	13
Jeong Jae-seok	LW10.5	Men's 20 km, sitting	—N/a				58:35.2	18
Kim Min-yeong; Guide: Byeon Ju-jeong	NS3	Men's sprint classical, visually impaired	3:03.04	11	Did not advance			
Kim Min-yeong; Guide: Byeon Ju-jeong	NS3	Men's 10 km classical, visually impaired	—N/a				37:24.7	14
Sin Eui-hyun	LW12	Men's sprint, sitting	2:25.04	21	Did not advance			
Sin Eui-hyun	LW12	Men's 10 km, sitting	—N/a				25:36.6	9
Sin Eui-hyun	LW12	Men's 20 km, sitting	—N/a				55:45.0	11
Han Seung-hee	LW10	Women's sprint, sitting	2:44.74	6 Q	3:26.1	6	Did not advance	
Han Seung-hee	LW10	Women's 10 km, sitting	—N/a				DNS	
Kim Yun-ji	LW10.5	Women's sprint, sitting	2:35.19	2 Q	3:01.1	1 Q	3:10.1	2nd place, silver medalist(s)
Kim Yun-ji	LW10.5	Women's 10 km, sitting	—N/a				26:51.6	2nd place, silver medalist(s)
Kim Yun-ji	LW10.5	Women's 20 km, sitting	—N/a				58:23.3	1st place, gold medalist(s)

== Para snowboard ==
Banked slalom

Athlete	Event	Run 1	Run 2	Best	Rank
Jeong Soo-min	Men's banked slalom, SB-UL	1:07.76	1:05.20	1:05.20	16
Lee Chung-min	Men's banked slalom, SB-UL	1:02.95	1:02.67	1:02.67	14
Lee Je-hyuk	Men's banked slalom, SB-LL2	1:01.51	1:03.76	1:01.51	16

Snowboard cross

Athlete	Event	Seeding		Pre-heats	Quarterfinal	Semifinal	Final	
Athlete	Event	Time	Rank	Position	Position	Position	Position	Rank
Jeong Soo-min	Men's snowboard cross, SB-UL	56.33	16	2 Q	3	Did not advance		
Lee Chung-min	Men's snowboard cross, SB-UL	53.92	11	Bye	RAL	Did not advance		
Lee Je-hyuk	Men's snowboard cross, SB-LL2	51.74	6	—N/a	1 Q	2 Q	3	3rd place, bronze medalist(s)

== Wheelchair curling ==
Summary

Team	Event	Group stage										Semifinal	Final / BM	
Team	Event	Opposition Score	Opposition Score	Opposition Score	Opposition Score	Opposition Score	Opposition Score	Opposition Score	Opposition Score	Opposition Score	Rank	Opposition Score	Opposition Score	Rank
Yang Hui-tae; Lee Hyeon-chul; Nam Bong-kwang; Bang Min-ja; Cha Jin-ho	Mixed team	LAT; W 10–2	SWE; L 6–8	CHN; L 5–7	GBR; W 7–6	SVK; W 7–5	NOR; W 9–0	USA; L 2–9	CAN; L 3–6	ITA; W 6–5	4 Q	CAN; L 7–8	SWE; L 7–4	4
Baek Hye-jin; Lee Yong-suk	Mixed doubles	ITA; L 5–7	GBR; W 14–3	JPN; W 9–0	CHN; L 6–10	USA; W 10–1	LAT; L 4–5	EST; W 10–0	—N/a		3 Q	USA; W 6–3	CHN; L 7–9	2nd place, silver medalist(s)

=== Mixed tournament ===
Final Round Robin Standings
Team	Skip	Pld	W	L	W–L	PF	PA	EW	EL	BE	SE	S%	DSC	Qualification
Canada	Mark Ideson	9	9	0	–	71	36	36	26	2	19	68.2%	84.488	Playoffs
China	Wang Haitao	9	8	1	–	76	42	38	26	1	15	68.3%	83.350	Playoffs
Sweden	Viljo Petersson-Dahl	9	5	4	1–0	47	48	31	31	6	13	62.8%	98.125	Playoffs
South Korea	Yang Hui-tae	9	5	4	0–1	55	48	36	32	1	17	64.6%	90.525	Playoffs
Norway	Jostein Stordahl	9	4	5	1–0	41	55	28	31	2	12	58.3%	130.863	
Italy	Egidio Marchese	9	4	5	0–1	52	53	32	27	0	15	60.6%	107.831	
Latvia	Ojārs Briedis	9	3	6	2–0	45	67	27	33	0	12	50.2%	113.381	
Slovakia	Radoslav Ďuriš	9	3	6	1–1	42	56	26	37	1	13	51.9%	117.688	
United States	Sean O'Neill	9	3	6	0–2	54	52	34	32	0	14	58.3%	72.156	
Great Britain	Hugh Nibloe	9	1	8	–	40	66	26	39	0	7	55.7%	129.675	

Source: Official website

Round robin
South Korea had a bye in draws 3, 8 and 10.

Draw 1
Saturday, March 7, 9:35

Sheet B	1	2	3	4	5	6	7	8	Final
South Korea (Yang) 🔨	5	1	0	1	0	3	X	X	10
Latvia (Briedis)	0	0	1	0	1	0	X	X	2

Draw 2
Saturday, March 7, 18:35

Sheet C	1	2	3	4	5	6	7	8	EE	Final
Sweden (Petersson-Dahl) 🔨	0	2	0	2	0	1	1	0	2	8
South Korea (Yang)	1	0	3	0	1	0	0	1	0	6

Draw 4
Sunday, March 8, 18:35

Sheet D	1	2	3	4	5	6	7	8	Final
China (Wang)	1	0	2	0	2	0	1	1	7
South Korea (Yang) 🔨	0	1	0	2	0	2	0	0	5

Draw 5
Monday, March 9, 9:35

Sheet A	1	2	3	4	5	6	7	8	Final
South Korea (Yang)	1	2	0	0	0	2	0	2	7
Great Britain (Nibloe) 🔨	0	0	1	2	1	0	2	0	6

Draw 6
Monday, March 9, 18:35

Sheet B	1	2	3	4	5	6	7	8	Final
South Korea (Yang) 🔨	0	2	1	1	0	1	2	0	7
Slovakia (Ďuriš)	1	0	0	0	2	0	0	2	5

Draw 7
Tuesday, March 10, 9:35

Sheet D	1	2	3	4	5	6	7	8	Final
South Korea (Yang)	1	1	2	2	1	1	1	X	9
Norway (Stordahl) 🔨	0	0	0	0	0	0	0	X	0

Draw 9
Wednesday, March 11, 9:05

Sheet B	1	2	3	4	5	6	7	8	Final
United States (O'Neill) 🔨	0	3	1	3	0	1	1	X	9
South Korea (Yang)	1	0	0	0	1	0	0	X	2

Draw 11
Thursday, March 12, 13:35

Sheet A	1	2	3	4	5	6	7	8	Final
Canada (Ideson)	1	1	0	2	0	0	1	1	6
South Korea (Yang) 🔨	0	0	1	0	1	1	0	0	3

Draw 12
Thursday, March 12, 18:35

Sheet C	1	2	3	4	5	6	7	8	Final
South Korea (Yang)	0	3	0	0	1	1	0	1	6
Italy (Marchese) 🔨	2	0	2	0	0	0	1	0	5

Semifinal

Friday, March 13, 10:05

Sheet B	1	2	3	4	5	6	7	8	Final
Canada (Ideson) 🔨	2	0	0	1	1	0	1	3	8
South Korea (Yang)	0	2	2	0	0	3	0	0	7

Bronze medal game

Friday, March 13, 18:35

Sheet C	1	2	3	4	5	6	7	8	Final
South Korea (Yang)	0	0	2	0	0	0	2	0	4
Sweden (Petersson-Dahl) 🔨	0	1	0	2	0	2	0	2	7

=== Mixed doubles ===
Final Round Robin Standings
Team	Athletes	Pld	W	L	W–L	PF	PA	EW	EL	BE	SE	S%	DSC	Qualification
China	Wang Meng / Yang Jinqiao	7	6	1	–	66	32	32	21	0	14	64.9%	106.033	Playoffs
United States	Laura Dwyer / Steve Emt	7	4	3	1–1	43	43	25	27	0	9	53.4%	89.717	Playoffs
South Korea	Baek Hye-jin / Lee Yong-suk	7	4	3	1–1	58	26	30	19	0	17	59.9%	142.058	Playoffs
Latvia	Poļina Rožkova / Agris Lasmans	7	4	3	1–1	46	45	28	25	0	12	48.5%	150.675	Playoffs
Great Britain	Jo Butterfield / Jason Kean	7	3	4	1–0	47	56	25	29	0	8	51.5%	95.075	
Japan	Aki Ogawa / Yoji Nakajima	7	3	4	0–1	30	53	19	30	0	8	49.0%	88.067	
Estonia	Katlin Riidebach / Ain Villau	7	2	5	1–0	31	58	22	28	0	9	47.6%	98.233	
Italy	Orietta Bertò / Paolo Ioriatti	7	2	5	0–1	43	51	28	30	0	11	55.6%	73.700	

Source: Official website

Round robin

Draw 1
Wednesday, March 4, 19:05

Sheet A	1	2	3	4	5	6	7	8	Final
Italy (Bertò / Ioriatti)	1	2	1	0	1	1	1	0	7
South Korea (Baek / Lee) 🔨	0	0	0	4	0	0	0	1	5

Draw 2
Thursday, March 5, 10:05

Sheet D	1	2	3	4	5	6	7	8	Final
Great Britain (Butterfield / Kean) 🔨	1	0	1	0	0	1	0	X	3
South Korea (Baek / Lee)	0	3	0	5	2	0	4	X	14

Draw 3
Thursday, March 5, 19:05

Sheet B	1	2	3	4	5	6	7	8	Final
South Korea (Baek / Lee)	1	1	2	2	2	1	X	X	9
Japan (Ogawa / Nakajima) 🔨	0	0	0	0	0	0	X	X	0

Draw 4
Friday, March 6, 9:05

Sheet C	1	2	3	4	5	6	7	8	Final
China (Wang / Yang) 🔨	1	0	2	1	0	2	0	4	10
South Korea (Baek / Lee)	0	1	0	0	3	0	2	0	6

Draw 5
Saturday, March 7, 14:35

Sheet A	1	2	3	4	5	6	7	8	Final
South Korea (Baek / Lee)	3	1	0	3	1	2	X	X	10
United States (Dwyer / Emt) 🔨	0	0	1	0	0	0	X	X	1

Draw 6
Sunday, March 8, 14:35

Sheet B	1	2	3	4	5	6	7	8	Final
Latvia (Rožkova / Lasmans)	0	1	1	0	0	1	0	2	5
South Korea (Baek / Lee) 🔨	1	0	0	1	1	0	1	0	4

Draw 7
Monday, March 9, 14:35

Sheet D	1	2	3	4	5	6	7	8	Final
South Korea (Baek / Lee) 🔨	3	1	1	1	3	1	X	X	10
Estonia (Riidebach / Villau)	0	0	0	0	0	0	X	X	0

Semifinal

Tuesday, March 10, 14:35

Sheet D	1	2	3	4	5	6	7	8	Final
United States (Dwyer / Emt) 🔨	0	1	0	1	0	0	1	X	3
South Korea (Baek / Lee)	2	0	2	0	1	1	0	X	6

Final

Wednesday, March 11, 14:35

Sheet C	1	2	3	4	5	6	7	8	EE	Final
China (Wang / Yang) 🔨	3	0	2	0	0	2	0	0	2	9
South Korea (Baek / Lee)	0	1	0	1	1	0	3	1	0	7

== See also ==
- South Korea at the Paralympics
- South Korea at the 2026 Winter Olympics
