= Serafym Drahun =

Ukrainian Paralympic Nordic skier (born 2005)

Personal information
- Born: 22 May 2005 (age 21) Zakarpatska, Ukraine

Sport
- Country: Ukraine
- Sport: Paralympic Nordic skiing
- Disability class: LW8

Serafym Drahun (Ukrainian: Серафим Драгун; born 22 May 2005) is a Ukrainian Paralympic Nordic skier. He represented Ukraine at the 2022 and 2026 Winter Paralympics.

== Career ==
Drahun represented Ukraine at the 2022 Winter Paralympics. He again represented Ukraine at the 2026 Winter Paralympics with his best finish in para biathlon being fifth place in the sprint pursuit. He also competed in para cross-country with his best finish being fourth place in the open relay.
