= Oleksandr Aleksyk =

Ukrainian Para Nordic skier (born 2004)

Personal information
- Born: 23 July 2004 (age 22) Zakarpattia Oblast, Ukraine

Sport
- Sport: Para Nordic skiing (Para cross-country skiing and Para biathlon)
- Disability class: LW12

Achievements and titles
- Paralympic finals: Beijing 2022, Milan/Cortina 2026
Medal record
Representing Ukraine
Men's Para biathlon
World Para Biathlon Championships
| Bronze medal – third place | 2025 Pokljuka | Sprint pursuit sitting |
Men's Para cross-country skiing
World Para Nordic Skiing Championships
| Gold medal – first place | 2025 Toblach | Mixed relay |

Oleksandr Aleksyk (born 23 July 2004) is a Ukrainian Para cross-country skier and biathlete. He represented Ukraine at the 2022 and 2026 Winter Paralympics.

== Career ==
Aleksyk competes in para-biathlon and para cross-country skiing in the LW12 sitting classification and represents Ukraine in international competitions.

Aleksyk competed at the 2022 Winter Paralympics in Beijing, where he participated in several para-biathlon and cross-country skiing events. His best results included 13th place finishes in the biathlon individual and middle distance sitting events, as well as 11th place in the cross-country skiing middle distance sitting race.

In international competition, Aleksyk has also competed at the World Championships in para-biathlon and cross-country skiing. At the 2025 World Championships in Pokljuka, he won a bronze medal in the sprint pursuit sitting event as part of the Ukrainian team's strong overall performance in the competition. He then competed at the 2025 World Para Nordic Skiing Championships in Toblach, and was part of the Ukrainian team that won the gold medal in the mixed relay together with Pavlo Bal, Oleksandra Kononova and Liudmyla Liashenko.

He again competed at the 2026 Winter Paralympics in Milan and Cortina d'Ampezzo, participating in the sitting-class sprint and individual events in para cross-country skiing.

== Results ==
=== Paralympic Games ===
| Year | Venue | Sport | Results |
|---|---|---|---|
| 2022 | China Beijing | Biathlon | 13th Individual Sitting; 13th Middle distance Sitting; 19th Sprint Sitting |
| 2022 | China Beijing | Cross-country skiing | 11th Middle distance Sitting |

=== World Championships ===
| Year | Venue | Sport | Results |
|---|---|---|---|
| 2023 | Sweden Östersund | Biathlon | 8th Sprint Sitting; 10th Individual Sitting; 11th Middle distance Sitting |
| 2024 | Canada Prince George, British Columbia | Biathlon | 5th Sprint Sitting; 9th Sprint pursuit Sitting; 12th Individual Sitting |
| 2025 | Slovenia Pokljuka | Biathlon | 3rd Sprint pursuit Sitting; 6th Sprint Sitting; 7th Individual Sitting |
| 2025 | Italy Toblach | Cross-country skiing | 1st Mixed relay |
