= Vitaliy Trush =

Ukrainian biathlete (born 1996)

Personal information
- Born: 6 June 1996 (age 30) Stryi, Lviv Oblast, Ukraine
- Height: 174 cm (5 ft 9 in)

Sport
- Sport: Skiing
- Club: Dynamo

World Cup career
- Seasons: 2015-2022
Medal record
Youth World Championships
Silver medal – second place	2015 Minsk	3 × 7.5 km relay

Vitaliy Trush (born June 6, 1996, in Stryi, Lviv Oblast, Ukraine) is a former Ukrainian biathlete. He was a silver medalist in youth relay at the Biathlon Junior World Championships 2015 in Minsk. He competed at the Biathlon World Championships 2019 in Östersund, Sweden.

Trush retired from competitive international biathlon in 2022. Later he competed as a guide for visually impaired cross-country skiers, including FIS Nordic World Ski Championships 2025 and 2026 Winter Paralympics. At the 2026 Paralympics, he was guide for Maksym Murashkovskyi who won silver in men's individual.

== Performances ==
=== World Championships ===
Event	Individual	Sprint	Pursuit	Mass start	Relay	Mixed relay	Single mixed relay
(Sweden) 2019 Östersund	59th	94th	—	—	—	—	—

*During Olympic seasons competitions are only held for those events not included in the Olympic program.

=== IBU Cup ===
==== Relay podiums ====
Season	Place	Competition	Rank
2018–19	Ridnaun-Val Ridanna, Italy	Single mixed relay	3
2018–19	Lenzerheide, Switzerland	Single mixed relay	3
2019–20	Brezno-Osrblie, Slovakia	Single mixed relay	3

=== IBU Junior Cup ===
==== Individual podiums ====
Season	Place	Competition	Rank
2015-16	Martell-Val Martello, Italy	Sprint	1
2016-17	Lenzerheide, Switzerland	Sprint	1
2016-17	Hochfilzen, Austria	Sprint	2
2016-17	Hochfilzen, Austria	Pursuit	1
