= Maksym Murashkovskyi =

Ukrainian Paralympic Nordic skier (born 2000)

Personal information
- Born: 26 June 2000 (age 26)

Sport
- Country: Ukraine
- Sport: Paralympic Nordic skiing
- Disability: Visually impaired
- Disability class: NS3
Medal record
Men's para biathlon
Representing Ukraine
Winter Paralympics
Silver medal – second place	2026 Milano Cortina	12.5 km individual
World Championships
Bronze medal – third place	2023 Östersund	12.5km individual

Maksym Murashkovskyi (Ukrainian: Максим Мурашковський; born 26 June 2000) is a Ukrainian visually impaired Paralympic cross-country skier and biathlete.

== Career ==
Murashkovskyi competed at the 2023 World Para Nordic Skiing Championships and won a bronze medal in the 12.5 kilometre individual event.

In February 2026, he was selected to represent Ukraine at the 2026 Winter Paralympics.
