= Para biathlon at the 2026 Winter Paralympics =

Para biathlon at the XIV Paralympic Winter Games
- Venue: Lago di Tesero Cross-Country Stadium
- Dates: 7–13 March

Para biathlon was one of the competitions at the 2026 Winter Paralympics in Milan and Cortina d'Ampezzo, Italy. In total, 18 medal events were held.

== Medal summary ==
=== Medal table ===
The ranking in the table is based on information provided by the International Paralympic Committee (IPC) and will be consistent with IPC convention in its published medal tables. By default, the table will be ordered by the number of gold medals the athletes from a nation have won (in this context, a "nation" is an entity represented by a National Paralympic Committee). The number of silver medals is taken into consideration next and then the number of bronze medals. If nations are still tied, equal ranking is given and they are listed alphabetically by IPC country code.

* Host nation (Italy)

Rank	Nation	Gold	Silver	Bronze	Total
1	China	8	5	2	15
2	Ukraine	3	6	7	16
3	Canada	2	2	0	4
4	United States	2	1	1	4
5	Czech Republic	1	2	1	4
6	South Korea	1	1	0	2
7	Kazakhstan	1	0	0	1
8	Germany	0	1	8	9
Totals (8 entries)		18	18	19	55

=== Women's events ===
Event	Class	Gold		Silver		Bronze	
Individual	visually impaired	Wang Yue; Guide: Chen Guoming; China	35:04.7	Simona Bubeníčková; Guide: David Šrůtek; Czech Republic	36:43.9	Johanna Recktenwald; Guide: Emily Rose Weiss; Germany	37:05.2
Individual	sitting	Kim Yun-ji; South Korea	38:00.1	Anja Wicker; Germany	38:12.9	Kendall Gretsch; United States	38:36.1
Individual	standing	Natalie Wilkie; Canada	33:01.8	Zhao Zhiqing; China	33:33.5	Oleksandra Kononova; Ukraine	33:37.9
Sprint	visually impaired	Wang Yue; Guide: Chen Guoming; China	19:52.5	Carina Edlingerová; Guide: Alexandr Paťava; Czech Republic	20:20.5	Leonie Walter; Guide: Christian Krasman; Germany	20:32.2
Sprint	sitting	Oksana Masters; United States	21:21.3	Kendall Gretsch; United States	21:37.3	Anja Wicker; Germany	22:32.4
Sprint	standing	Oleksandra Kononova; Ukraine	18:41.5	Natalie Wilkie; Canada	18:46.4	Liudmyla Liashenko; Ukraine	19:13.9
Sprint pursuit	visually impaired	Carina Edlingerová; Guide: Alexandr Paťava; Czech Republic	13:38.1	Wang Yue; Guide: Chen Guoming; China	13:48.0	Simona Bubeníčková; Guide: David Šrůtek; Czech Republic Leonie Walter; Guide: Christian Krasman; Germany	13:59.2
Sprint pursuit	sitting	Kendall Gretsch; United States	11:33.1	Kim Yun-ji; South Korea	11:41.6	Anja Wicker; Germany	12:39.1
Sprint pursuit	standing	Natalie Wilkie; Canada	12:18.0	Iryna Bui; Ukraine	12:35.7	Oleksandra Kononova; Ukraine	12:49.0

=== Men's events ===
Event	Class	Gold		Silver		Bronze	
Individual	visually impaired	Dang Hesong; Guide: Lu Hongda; China	31:31.9	Maksym Murashkovskyi; Guide: Vitaliy Trush; Ukraine	33:41.1	Dmytro Suiarko; Guide: Oleksandr Nikonovych; Ukraine	33:51.1
Individual	sitting	Liu Zixu; China	34:38.1	Mao Zhongwu; China	35:06.5	Taras Rad; Ukraine	35:57.1
Individual	standing	Cai Jiayun; China	30:24.1	Mark Arendz; Canada	30:52.5	Marco Maier; Germany	31:07.3
Sprint	visually impaired	Oleksandr Kazik; Guide: Serhii Kucheriavyi; Ukraine	17:37.7	Iaroslav Reshetynskyi; Guide: Dmytro Drahun; Ukraine	18:40.1	Anatolii Kovalevskyi; Guide: Oleksandr Mukshyn; Ukraine	18:43.8
Sprint	sitting	Taras Rad; Ukraine	19:55.5	Liu Mengtao; China	20:04.8	Liu Zixu; China	20:13.1
Sprint	standing	Cai Jiayun; China	17:13.6	Liu Xiaobin; China	17:35.4	Marco Maier; Germany	17:42.4
Sprint pursuit	visually impaired	Yu Shuang; Guide:Shang Jincai; China	11:39.2	Oleksandr Kazik; Guide: Serhii Kucheriavyi; Ukraine	11:53.0	Anatolii Kovalevskyi; Guide: Oleksandr Mukshyn; Ukraine	12:13.7
Sprint pursuit	sitting	Yerbol Khamitov; Kazakhstan	9:39.0	Taras Rad; Ukraine	10:00.5	Liu Zixu; China	10:11.5
Sprint pursuit	standing	Cai Jiayun; China	10:33.4	Grygorii Vovchynskyi; Ukraine	10:33.6	Marco Maier; Germany	11:08.5

== See also ==
- Biathlon at the 2026 Winter Olympics
