= Pavlo Bal =

Ukrainian Para biathlete, cross-country skier, and cyclist (born 1986)

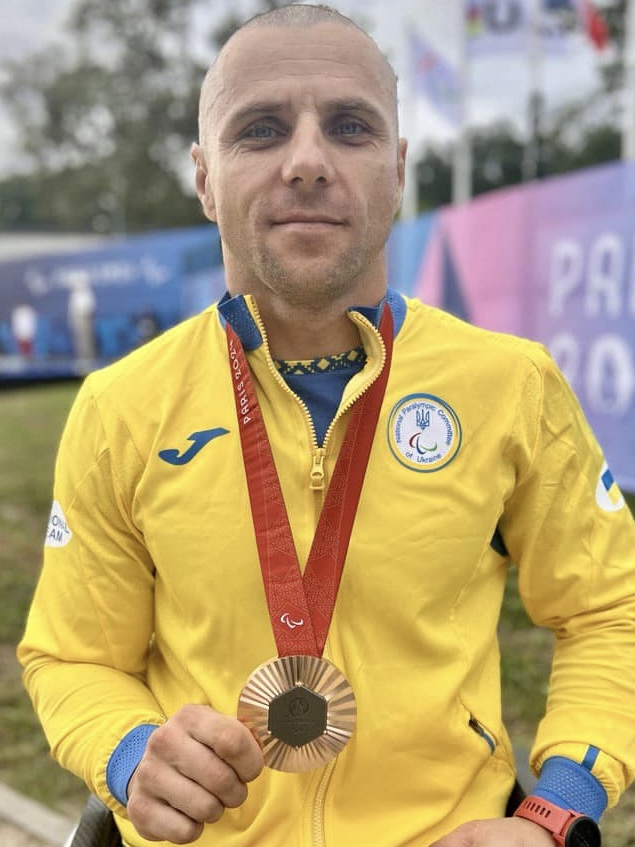
- Bal at the 2024 Summer Paralympics

Personal information
- Nationality: Ukraine
- Born: 12 June 1986 (age 40) Ukraine

Sport
- Sport: Para biathlon; Para cross-country skiing; Para cycling
- Disability class: LW11.5
Medal record
Representing Ukraine
Men's Para cycling
Paralympic Games
Bronze medal – third place	2024 Paris	Road race H5
Road World Championships
Bronze medal – third place	2024 Zurich	Road race H5
Winter Paralympics
Men's Para cross-country skiing
Silver medal – second place	2026 Milano Cortina	4 × 2.5 km mixed relay
Men's Para biathlon
World Para Snow Sports Championships
Gold medal – first place	2021 Lillehammer	12.5 km

Pavlo Bal (Ukrainian: Павло Баль; born 12 June 1986) is a Ukrainian Para biathlete, Para cross-country skier and Para cyclist.

== Career ==
At the 2021 World Para Snow Sports Championships in biathlon, Bal won the gold medal at the 12.5 event. He won the bronze medal in the H5 road race at the 2024 Paralympics.
