= Para snowboard at the 2026 Winter Paralympics – Men's banked slalom =

Men's banked slalom at the XIV Paralympic Winter Games
- Venue: Cortina Para Snowboard Park
- Dates: 13 March

Men's banked slalom SB-UL at the XIV Paralympic Winter Games
- Competitors: 21 from 15 nations

Medalists
1st place, gold medalist(s)		Jacopo Luchini	Italy
2nd place, silver medalist(s)		Wang Pengyao	China
3rd place, bronze medalist(s)		Jiang Zihao	China

Men's banked slalom SB-LL1 at the XIV Paralympic Winter Games
- Competitors: 18 from 12 nations

Medalists
1st place, gold medalist(s)		Noah Elliott	United States
2nd place, silver medalist(s)		Daichi Oguri	Japan
3rd place, bronze medalist(s)		Mike Schultz	United States

Men's banked slalom SB-LL2 at the XIV Paralympic Winter Games
- Competitors: 20 from 14 nations

Medalists
1st place, gold medalist(s)		Emanuel Perathoner	Italy
2nd place, silver medalist(s)		Fabrice von Grünigen	Switzerland
3rd place, bronze medalist(s)		Ben Tudhope	Australia

The men's banked slalom competition of the 2026 Winter Paralympics was held at the Cortina Para Snowboard Park on 13 March 2026.

== Medal table ==
Rank	Nation	Gold	Silver	Bronze	Total
1	Italy (ITA)*	2	0	0	2
2	United States (USA)	1	0	1	2
3	China (CHN)	0	1	1	2
4	Japan (JPN)	0	1	0	1
4	Switzerland (SUI)	0	1	0	1
6	Australia (AUS)	0	0	1	1
Totals (6 entries)		3	3	3	9

== Banked slalom SB-UL ==
Rank	Bib	Name	Country	Run 1	Run 2	Best
1st place, gold medalist(s)	8	Jacopo Luchini	Italy	56.28	56.94	56.28
2nd place, silver medalist(s)	4	Wang Pengyao	China	57.53	56.62	56.62
3rd place, bronze medalist(s)	6	Jiang Zihao	China	57.03	1:15.82	57.03
4	2	Ji Lijia	China	DSQ	57.10	57.10
5	3	Aron Fahrni	Switzerland	57.17	57.38	57.17
6	1	Maxime Montaggioni	France	57.26	57.48	57.26
7	7	James Barnes-Miller	Great Britain	1:00.42	59.08	59.08
8	5	Dean van Kooij	Netherlands	1:00.26	1:00.29	1:00.26
9	17	Paolo Priolo	Italy	1:02.18	1:01.26	1:01.26
10	9	Adam Krupa	Slovakia	1:01.29	1:01.36	1:01.29
11	14	Matt Hamilton	Great Britain	1:01.81	1:01.46	1:01.46
12	12	Sean Pollard	Australia	1:01.78	1:01.74	1:01.74
13	10	Masataka Oiwane	Japan	1:02.11	DNF	1:02.11
14	11	Lee Chung-min	South Korea	1:02.95	1:02.67	1:02.67
15	15	Niklas Lohne-Hansen	Norway	DSQ	1:02.69	1:02.69
16	13	Jeong Soo-min	South Korea	1:07.76	1:05.20	1:05.20
17	16	Konstantinos Petrakis	Greece	1:06.72	1:05.30	1:05.30
18	19	Oliver Dreier	Austria	1:06.21	1:06.65	1:06.21
19	18	Davy Zyw	Great Britain	1:08.14	1:08.39	1:08.14
20	21	Matti Sairanen	Finland	1:09.30	1:09.98	1:09.30
21	20	Vladyslav Khilchenko	Ukraine	1:13.32	1:12.24	1:12.24

== Banked slalom SB-LL1 ==
Rank	Bib	Name	Country	Run 1	Run 2	Best
1st place, gold medalist(s)	26	Noah Elliott	United States	58.96	58.94	58.94
2nd place, silver medalist(s)	22	Daichi Oguri	Japan	1:00.09	59.02	59.02
3rd place, bronze medalist(s)	23	Mike Schultz	United States	1:00.59	1:00.05	1:00.05
4	27	Wu Zhongwei	China	1:00.99	1:00.35	1:00.35
5	25	Junta Kosuda	Japan	1:00.97	1:00.48	1:00.48
6	28	Tyler Turner	Canada	1:02.40	1:00.66	1:00.66
7	29	Chris Vos	Netherlands	1:02.84	1:02.70	1:02.70
8	24	Liu Yiyang	China	1:09.65	1:03.50	1:03.50
9	32	Bruno Bošnjak	Croatia	1:03.56	DSQ	1:03.56
10	30	Christian Schmiedt	Germany	1:07.43	1:07.79	1:07.43
11	31	Chase Nicklin	Canada	1:10.52	1:09.71	1:09.71
12	38	Dmitry Fadeev	Russia	1:11.42	1:10.96	1:10.96
13	36	Aaron McCarthy	Australia	1:13.38	1:11.80	1:11.80
14	34	Andrea Barbieri	Brazil	1:16.31	1:11.86	1:11.86
15	33	René Eckhart	Austria	1:13.77	1:12.01	1:12.01
16	37	Markus Schmidhofer	Austria	1:44.91	1:52.04	1:44.91
	39	Filipp Shebbo	Russia	DNF	DNF	DNF
	35	Mihăiță Papară	Romania	DNF	DNS	DNF

== Banked slalom SB-LL2 ==
Rank	Bib	Name	Country	Run 1	Run 2	Best
1st place, gold medalist(s)	42	Emanuel Perathoner	Italy	55.10	54.28	54.28
2nd place, silver medalist(s)	41	Fabrice von Grünigen	Switzerland	56.29	56.37	56.29
3rd place, bronze medalist(s)	40	Ben Tudhope	Australia	57.43	57.33	57.33
4	43	Sun Qi	China	57.72	58.14	57.72
5	47	Zach Miller	United States	58.11	57.86	57.86
6	51	Yan Wendi	China	58.99	58.21	58.21
7	44	Ollie Hill	Great Britain	58.23	58.30	58.23
8	48	Keith Gabel	United States	58.92	58.79	58.79
9	53	Philippe Nadreau	Canada	1:04.14	59.18	59.18
10	52	Alex Massie	Canada	1:00.94	59.48	59.48
11	45	Joe Pleban	United States	1:00.63	59.85	59.85
12	56	Emilio Redondo	Spain	1:00.04	1:00.21	1:00.04
13	50	Rapolas Micevičius	Lithuania	1:00.10	1:00.59	1:00.10
14	55	Fubuki Ushiroda	Japan	1:02.50	1:00.34	1:00.34
15	46	Takahito Ichikawa	Japan	DNF	1:00.48	1:00.48
16	54	Lee Je-hyuk	South Korea	1:01.51	1:03.76	1:01.51
17	49	Keiji Okamoto	Japan	1:03.02	1:02.14	1:02.14
18	57	Diogo Carmona	Portugal	1:16.58	1:07.52	1:07.52
19	58	Valerian Lomaia	Georgia	1:10.58	1:08.50	1:08.50
20	59	Andrej Šibalić	Montenegro	1:23.78	1:19.07	1:19.07

== See also ==
- Snowboarding at the 2026 Winter Olympics
