= Australia at the 2026 Winter Paralympics =

- Flag of Australia
- IPC code: AUS
- NPC: Paralympics Australia
- Website: www.paralympic.org.au

in Milano Cortina, Italy
- Competitors: 14 (8 men and 6 women)
- Flag bearers (opening): Georgia Gunew & Ben Tudhope
- Flag bearers (closing): Lauren Parker & Sean Pollard
- Medals Ranked 21st: Gold 0 Silver 1 Bronze 1 Total 2

Winter Paralympics appearances (overview)
- 1976; 1980; 1984; 1988; 1992; 1994; 1998; 2002; 2006; 2010; 2014; 2018; 2022; 2026

Australia competed at the 2026 Winter Paralympics in Milan and Cortina d'Ampezzo, Italy, between 6 and 15 March 2026. It competed in four sports for the first time: Para-alpine skiing, Para-snowboard, Para-cross country, and Para-biathlon.

== Administration ==
Ben Troy was the Australian Team Chef de Mission and Toby Kane Deputy Chef de Mission. Snowboarder Sean Pollard was appointed team captain. Since the Beijing 2022 Winter Games, the Australian Government invested $37.5 million in high performance winter programs through the Australian Sports Commission, with an additional $3.3 million to directly support athletes through dAIS.

== Competitors ==
Sport	Men	Women	Total
Para alpine skiing	3	2	5
Para biathlon / Para cross country skiing	2	3	5
Para snowboard	3	1	4
Total	8	6	14

== Medallists ==
Medal	Name	Sport	Event	Date
Silver	Ben Tudhope	Para snowboard	Men's snowboard cross, SB-LL2	8 March 2026
Bronze	Ben Tudhope	Para snowboard	Men's banked slalom, SB-LL2	13 March 2026

Medals by sport
Sport	1st place, gold medalist(s)	2nd place, silver medalist(s)	3rd place, bronze medalist(s)	Total
Snowboarding	0	1	1	2
Total	0	1	1	2

Medals by date
Day	Date	1st place, gold medalist(s)	2nd place, silver medalist(s)	3rd place, bronze medalist(s)	Total
Day 1	8 March	0	1	0	1
Day 6	13 March	0	0	1	1
Total		0	1	1	2

Medals by gender
Gender	1st place, gold medalist(s)	2nd place, silver medalist(s)	3rd place, bronze medalist(s)	Total
Female	0	0	0	0
Male	0	1	1	2
Mixed	0	0	0	0
Total	0	1	1	2

== Sports ==
=== Alpine skiing ===
Men

Athlete	Event	Final			
Athlete	Event	Run 1	Run 2	Total Time	Rank
Josh Hanlon (LW12)	Downhill - Sitting	DNF	—N/a	-	-
Josh Hanlon (LW12)	Slalom - Sitting	50.02 (10)	44.76 (8)	1:34.78	9
Josh Hanlon (LW12)	Giant slalom - Sitting	1:12.61 (13)	1:14.68 (10)	2:27.29	10
Josh Hanlon (LW12)	Super-G - Sitting	DNF	—N/a	-	-
Josh Hanlon (LW12)	Super combined - Sitting	1:22.74 (16)	47.02 (11)	2:09.76	12
Michael Milton (LW2)	Slalom - Standing	58.40 (22)	54.53 (20)	1:52.93	20
Michael Milton (LW2)	Giant slalom - Standing	DNS	—N/a	-	-
Michael Milton (LW2)	Super-G - Standing	1:21.98	—N/a	1:21.98	23
Michael Milton (LW2)	Super combined - Standing	1:22.50 (13)	54.23 (14)	2:16.73	13

Women

Athlete	Event	Final			
Athlete	Event	Run 1	Run 2	Total Time	Rank
Georgia Gunew / Ethan Jackson (guide) (AS2)	Slalom - Visually Impaired	52.21 (11)	52.20 (11)	1:44.41	11
Georgia Gunew / Ethan Jackson (guide) (AS2)	Giant slalom - Visually Impaired	1:31.02 (12)	1:30.34 (10)	3:01.36	10
Liana France (LW6/8-2)	Slalom - Standing	54.22 (15)	53.57 (13)	1:47.79	14
Liana France (LW6/8-2)	Giant slalom - Standing	1:26.69 (17)	1:29.76 (14)	2:56.45	15

=== Biathlon ===
Men

Athlete	Event	Qualification			Final		
Athlete	Event	Missed shots	Time	Rank	Missed shots	Time	Rank
Matt Brumby (LW10)	Sprint pursuit - Sitting	12:27.9	2	27	Did not advance		
Matt Brumby (LW10)	Sprint - Sitting	—N/a			2	32:34.6	28
David Miln (LW12)	Individual Sitting	—N/a			3	44:27.0	20
David Miln (LW12)	Sprint pursuit - Sitting	11:57.7	4	25	Did not advance		
David Miln (LW12)	Sprint - Sitting	—N/a			3	26:05.2	26

Women

Athlete	Event	Qualification			Final		
Athlete	Event	Missed shots	Time	Rank	Missed shots	Time	Rank
Taryn Dickens (NS3); Lynn Maree Cullen (Guide)	Individual - Visually Impaired	—N/a			3	59:39.9	13
Taryn Dickens (NS3); Lynn Maree Cullen (Guide)	Sprint pursuit - Visually Impaired	19:43.1	3	13	Did not advance		
Taryn Dickens (NS3); Lynn Maree Cullen (Guide)	Sprint - Visually Impaired	—N/a			3	35:10.1	14
Lauren Parker (LW10)	Individual - Sitting	—N/a			5	48:21.6	9
Lauren Parker (LW10)	Sprint pursuit - Sitting	10:52.4	2	8 Q	11:22.4	2	10
Lauren Parker (LW10)	Sprint - Sitting	—N/a			4	26:40.6	13

=== Cross Country Skiing ===
Men

Athlete	Event	Qualification		Semifinal		Final	
Athlete	Event	Result	Rank	Result	Rank	Result	Rank
Matt Brumby (LW10)	Men’s 10km classical - Sitting	—N/a				34:15.5	31
Matt Brumby (LW10)	Men's Sprint - Sitting	3:31.62	37	Did not advance			
David Miln (LW12)	Men’s 10km classical - Sitting	—N/a				28:20.3	20
David Miln (LW12)	Men's 20km Interval Start - Sitting	-				1:01:32.7	23
David Miln (LW12)	Men's Sprint - Sitting	2:33.82	28	Did not advance			

Women

Athlete	Event	Qualification		Semifinal		Final	
Athlete	Event	Result	Rank	Result	Rank	Result	Rank
Taryn Dickens (NS3); Lynn Maree Cullen (Guide)	Women's Sprint - Visually Impaired	5:21.76	13	Did not advance			
Lauren Parker (LS10)	Women’s 10km classical - Sitting	—N/a				29:39.5	8
Lauren Parker (LS10)	Women's 20km interval start - Sitting	—N/a				1:08:42.8	10
Lauren Parker (LS10)	Women's Sprint - Sitting	2:53.78	13	Did not advance			

=== Snowboarding ===
Men

Athlete	Event	Run 1		Run 2		Best time	
Athlete	Event	Time	Rank	Time	Rank	Time	Rank
Aaron McCarthy; SB-LL1	Men's snowboard banked	1:13.38	13	1:11.80	13	1:11.80	13
Sean Pollard; SB-UL	Men's snowboard banked	1:01.78	9	1:01.74	11	1:01.74	12
Ben Tudhope; SB-LL2	Men's snowboard banked	57.43	3	57.33	3	57.33	3rd place, bronze medalist(s)

Athlete	Event	Run 1	Run 2	Rank	Q/F	S/F	Final
Athlete	Event	Time	Time	Rank	Position	Position	Position
Aaron McCarthy; SB-LL1	Men's snowboard cross	DSG	1:02.73	14	3	—N/a	12
Sean Pollard; SB-UL	Men's snowboard cross	55.09	59.05	13	1 Q	3	9
Ben Tudhope; SB-LL2	Men's snowboard cross	51.26	51.38	2 Q	1 Q	1 Q	2nd place, silver medalist(s)

Women

Athlete	Event	Run 1	Run 2	Rank	Q/F	S/F	Final
Athlete	Event	Time	Time	Rank	Position	Position	Position
Amanda Reid; SB-LL1	Women's snowboard cross	1:33.36	1:05.30	8 Q	DNF	—N/a	9

Reid withdrew from banked snowboard due to injuries suffered in snowboard cross.

== Notable team facts ==
- Lauren Parker and Amanda Reid became the eighth and ninth Australian athletes, respectively, to compete at both the Winter and Summer Paralympic Games. Both were previously gold medallists at the Summer Games: Reid in Para cycling and Parker in Para triathlon and Para cycling.
- Amanda Reid became Australia's first Indigenous Winter Paralympian.
- Michael Milton, at 52 years and 350 days when the Games opened on 6 March, became the oldest ever Australian Winter Paralympian. He overtook Dominic Monypenny, who was 49 years and 163 days in his last event at the Vancouver 2010 Games. Liana France, aged 16 years and 211 days when the Games opened, is Australia's youngest competitor at the Games.
- Taryn Dickens became Australia's oldest female Winter Paralympian, at 43 years and 277 days when the Games opened, overtaking Melissa Perrine who was 34 years and 19 days in her last event at the Beijing 2022 Games.

== See also ==
- Australia at the 2026 Winter Olympics
