= Para snowboard at the 2026 Winter Paralympics – Women's banked slalom =

Women's banked slalom at the XIV Paralympic Winter Games
- Venue: Cortina Para Snowboard Park
- Dates: 13 March

Women's banked slalom SB-LL2 at the XIV Paralympic Winter Games
- Competitors: 13 from 9 nations

Medalists
1st place, gold medalist(s)		Kate Delson	United States
2nd place, silver medalist(s)		Lisa Bunschoten	Netherlands
3rd place, bronze medalist(s)		Brenna Huckaby	United States

The women's banked slalom competition of the 2026 Winter Paralympics was held at the Cortina Para Snowboard Park on 13 March 2026.

== Banked slalom SB-LL2 ==
Rank	Bib	Name	Country	Run 1	Run 2	Best
1st place, gold medalist(s)	8	Kate Delson	United States	1:03.75	1:02.99	1:02.99
2nd place, silver medalist(s)	1	Lisa Bunschoten	Netherlands	1:04.95	1:03.53	1:03.53
3rd place, bronze medalist(s)	4	Brenna Huckaby	United States	1:04.02	1:03.98	1:03.98
4	5	Cécile Hernandez	France	1:04.50	1:04.63	1:04.50
5	7	Geng Yanhong	China	1:06.42	1:04.98	1:04.98
6	3	Li Tiantian	China	1:07.56	1:07.06	1:07.06
7	10	Eri Sakashita	Japan	1:10.00	1:09.10	1:09.10
8	2	Hu Nianjia	China	1:11.29	1:09.54	1:09.54
9	11	Jaclyn Hamwey	United States	1:12.64	1:11.73	1:11.73
10	6	Nina Sparks	Great Britain	1:13.23	1:12.79	1:12.79
11	9	Sandrine Hamel	Canada	1:15.60	1:14.41	1:14.41
12	12	Vitoria Machado	Brazil	1:21.68	1:16.42	1:16.42
13	13	Natalia Siuba-Jarosz	Poland	1:20.75	1:20.08	1:20.08

== See also ==
- Snowboarding at the 2026 Winter Olympics
