= Para snowboard at the 2026 Winter Paralympics – Men's snowboard cross =

Men's snowboard cross at the XIV Paralympic Winter Games
- Venue: Cortina Para Snowboard Park
- Dates: 7–8 March
- Competitors: 52 from 22 nations

Men's snowboard cross SB-UL at the XIV Paralympic Winter Games
- Competitors: 20 from 14 nations

Medalists
1st place, gold medalist(s)		Ji Lijia	China
2nd place, silver medalist(s)		Zhu Yonggang	China
3rd place, bronze medalist(s)		Aron Fahrni	Switzerland

Men's snowboard cross SB-LL1 at the XIV Paralympic Winter Games
- Competitors: 16 from 11 nations

Medalists
1st place, gold medalist(s)		Wu Zhongwei	China
2nd place, silver medalist(s)		Noah Elliott	United States
3rd place, bronze medalist(s)		Tyler Turner	Canada

Men's snowboard cross SB-LL2 at the XIV Paralympic Winter Games
- Competitors: 16 from 10 nations

Medalists
1st place, gold medalist(s)		Emanuel Perathoner	Italy
2nd place, silver medalist(s)		Ben Tudhope	Australia
3rd place, bronze medalist(s)		Lee Je-hyuk	South Korea

The men's snowboard cross competition of the 2026 Winter Paralympics was held at the Cortina Para Snowboard Park on 7 and 8 March 2026.

== Medal table ==
* Host nation (Italy)

Rank	Nation	Gold	Silver	Bronze	Total
1	China (CHN)	2	1	0	3
2	Italy (ITA)*	1	0	0	1
3	Australia (AUS)	0	1	0	1
3	United States (USA)	0	1	0	1
5	Canada (CAN)	0	0	1	1
5	South Korea (KOR)	0	0	1	1
5	Switzerland (SUI)	0	0	1	1
Totals (7 entries)		3	3	3	9

== Snowboard cross SB-UL ==
The qualification was held on 7 March. Quarterfinals to finals were held on 8 March.

=== Seeding ===
Rank	Name	Country	Run 1	Run 2	Best
1	Wang Pengyao	China	50.49	49.95	49.95
2	Ji Lijia	China	50.46	50.17	50.17
3	Jacopo Luchini	Italy	51.62	50.52	50.52
4	Zhu Yonggang	China	52.83	52.06	52.06
5	James Barnes-Miller	Great Britain	54.08	52.17	52.17
6	Aron Fahrni	Switzerland	53.38	52.83	52.83
7	Riccardo Cardani	Italy	54.48	52.93	52.93
8	Maxime Montaggioni	France	53.19	53.26	53.19
9	Masataka Oiwane	Japan	53.51	58.89	53.51
10	Adam Krupa	Slovakia	54.08	53.81	53.81
11	Lee Chung-min	South Korea	53.92	54.46	53.92
12	Dean van Kooij	Netherlands	54.09	54.23	54.09
13	Sean Pollard	Australia	55.09	59.05	55.09
14	Niklas Lohne-Hansen	Norway	55.26	55.56	55.26
15	Oliver Dreier	Austria	56.15	57.16	56.15
16	Jeong Soo-min	South Korea	56.33	57.73	56.33
17	Paolo Priolo	Italy	57.69	57.70	57.69
18	Davy Zyw	Great Britain	58.67	58.58	58.58
19	Konstantinos Petrakis	Greece	1:02.98	1:01.94	1:01.94
20	Vladyslav Khilchenko	Ukraine	1:11.91	1:06.87	1:06.87

=== Elimination round ===
- Q — Qualified for the next round

==== Pre-heats ====
Heat 1

Rank	Bib	Name	Country	Notes
1	13	Sean Pollard	Australia	Q
2	16	Jeong Soo-min	South Korea	Q
3	17	Paolo Priolo	Italy	
4	20	Vladyslav Khilchenko	Ukraine	

Heat 2

Rank	Bib	Name	Country	Notes
1	14	Niklas Lohne-Hansen	Norway	Q
2	15	Oliver Dreier	Austria	Q
3	19	Konstantinos Petrakis	Greece	
–	18	Davy Zyw	Great Britain	DNF

==== Quarterfinals ====
Heat 1

Rank	Bib	Name	Country	Notes
1	8	Maxime Montaggioni	France	Q
2	1	Wang Pengyao	China	Q
3	16	Jeong Soo-min	South Korea	
4	9	Masataka Oiwane	Japan	

Heat 2

Rank	Bib	Name	Country	Notes
1	4	Zhu Yonggang	China	Q
2	12	Dean van Kooij	Netherlands	Q
3	13	Sean Pollard	Australia	
4	5	James Barnes-Miller	Great Britain	

Heat 3

Rank	Bib	Name	Country	Notes
1	3	Jacopo Luchini	Italy	Q
2	6	Aron Fahrni	Switzerland	Q
3	14	Niklas Lohne-Hansen	Norway	
–	11	Lee Chung-min	South Korea	RAL

Heat 4

Rank	Bib	Name	Country	Notes
1	2	Ji Lijia	China	Q
2	10	Adam Krupa	Slovakia	Q
–	15	Oliver Dreier	Austria	DNF
–	7	Riccardo Cardani	Italy	RAL

==== Semifinals ====
Heat 1

Rank	Bib	Name	Country	Notes
1	4	Zhu Yonggang	China	Q
2	1	Wang Pengyao	China	Q
3	8	Maxime Montaggioni	France	
4	12	Dean van Kooij	Netherlands	

Heat 2

Rank	Bib	Name	Country	Notes
1	2	Ji Lijia	China	Q
2	6	Aron Fahrni	Switzerland	Q
3	3	Jacopo Luchini	Italy	
4	10	Adam Krupa	Slovakia	

==== Finals ====
Small final

Rank	Bib	Name	Country	Notes
5	12	Dean van Kooij	Netherlands	
6	8	Maxime Montaggioni	France	DNF
7	10	Adam Krupa	Slovakia	DNF
8	3	Jacopo Luchini	Italy	RAL

Big final

Rank	Bib	Name	Country	Notes
1st place, gold medalist(s)	2	Ji Lijia	China	
2nd place, silver medalist(s)	4	Zhu Yonggang	China	
3rd place, bronze medalist(s)	6	Aron Fahrni	Switzerland	
4	1	Wang Pengyao	China	DSQ

== Snowboard cross SB-LL1 ==
The qualification was held on 7 March. Quarterfinals to finals were held on 8 March.

=== Seeding ===
Rank	Name	Country	Run 1	Run 2	Best
1	Tyler Turner	Canada	52.26	51.72	51.72
2	Chris Vos	Netherlands	53.44	53.05	53.05
3	Junta Kosuda	Japan	53.36	53.52	53.36
4	Mike Schultz	United States	53.80	53.63	53.63
5	Noah Elliott	United States	53.64	54.61	53.64
6	Daichi Oguri	Japan	53.85	54.74	53.85
7	Wu Zhongwei	China	56.68	54.94	54.94
8	Liu Yiyang	China	55.64	1:21.38	55.64
9	Christian Schmiedt	Germany	57.69	56.15	56.15
10	Bruno Bošnjak	Croatia	57.61	57.48	57.48
11	René Eckhart	Austria	16438	59.23	59.23
12	Dmitry Fadeev	Russia	59.87	59.45	59.45
13	Filipp Shebbo	Russia	1:02.02	1:27.28	1:02.02
14	Aaron McCarthy	Australia	DSQ	1:02.73	1:02.73
15	Chase Nicklin	Canada	1:20.44	1:14.84	1:14.84
16	Mihăiță Papară	Romania	1:23.10	1:22.89	1:22.89

=== Elimination round ===
==== Quarterfinals ====
Heat 1

Rank	Bib	Name	Country	Notes
1	1	Tyler Turner	Canada	Q
2	8	Liu Yiyang	China	Q
3	9	Christian Schmiedt	Germany	
–	16	Mihăiță Papară	Romania	DNS

Heat 2

Rank	Bib	Name	Country	Notes
1	4	Mike Schultz	United States	Q
2	5	Noah Elliott	United States	Q
3	12	Dmitry Fadeev	Russia	
4	13	Filipp Shebbo	Russia	

Heat 3

Rank	Bib	Name	Country	Notes
1	3	Junta Kosuda	Japan	Q
2	6	Daichi Oguri	Japan	Q
3	14	Aaron McCarthy	Australia	
4	11	René Eckhart	Austria	

Heat 4

Rank	Bib	Name	Country	Notes
1	7	Wu Zhongwei	China	Q
2	2	Chris Vos	Netherlands	Q
3	10	Bruno Bošnjak	Croatia	
–	15	Chase Nicklin	Canada	DSQ

==== Semifinals ====
Heat 1

Rank	Bib	Name	Country	Notes
1	1	Tyler Turner	Canada	Q
2	5	Noah Elliott	United States	Q
3	4	Mike Schultz	United States	
4	8	Liu Yiyang	China	

Heat 2

Rank	Bib	Name	Country	Notes
1	3	Junta Kosuda	Japan	Q
2	7	Wu Zhongwei	China	Q
3	6	Daichi Oguri	Japan	
4	2	Chris Vos	Netherlands	

==== Finals ====
Small final

Rank	Bib	Name	Country	Notes
5	2	Chris Vos	Netherlands	
6	4	Mike Schultz	United States	
7	6	Daichi Oguri	Japan	
8	8	Liu Yiyang	China	

Big final

Rank	Bib	Name	Country	Notes
1st place, gold medalist(s)	4	Wu Zhongwei	China	
2nd place, silver medalist(s)	5	Noah Elliott	United States	
3rd place, bronze medalist(s)	1	Tyler Turner	Canada	DSQ
4	3	Junta Kosuda	Japan	RAL

== Snowboard cross SB-LL2 ==
The qualification was held on 7 March. Quarterfinals to finals were held on 8 March.

=== Seeding ===
Rank	Name	Country	Run 1	Run 2	Best
1	Emanuel Perathoner	Italy	47.99	48.40	48.40
2	Ben Tudhope	Australia	51.26	51.38	51.26
3	Sun Qi	China	51.83	51.43	51.43
4	Keith Gabel	United States	51.64	52.25	51.64
5	Takahito Ichikawa	Japan	51.71	53.00	51.71
6	Lee Je-hyuk	South Korea	52.16	51.74	51.74
7	Joe Pleban	United States	52.16	51.82	51.82
8	Alex Massie	Canada	52.24	1:00.65	52.24
9	Rapolas Micevičius	Lithuania	53.37	52.51	52.51
10	Philippe Nadreau	Canada	52.99	53.49	52.99
11	Keiji Okamoto	Japan	54.15	53.26	53.26
12	Yan Wendi	China	53.35	53.48	53.35
13	Zach Miller	United States	53.38	53.58	53.38
14	Emilio Redondo	Spain	54.91	59.60	54.91
15	Fubuki Ushiroda	Japan	56.24	56.24	56.24
16	Fabrice von Grünigen	Switzerland	Did not start		

=== Elimination round ===
==== Quarterfinals ====
Heat 1

Rank	Bib	Name	Country	Notes
1	1	Emanuel Perathoner	Italy	Q
2	8	Alex Massie	Canada	Q
3	9	Rapolas Micevičius	Lithuania	
–	16	Fabrice von Grünigen	Switzerland	DNS

Heat 2

Rank	Bib	Name	Country	Notes
1	4	Keith Gabel	United States	Q
2	13	Zach Miller	United States	Q
3	12	Yan Wendi	China	
4	5	Takahito Ichikawa	Japan	

Heat 3

Rank	Bib	Name	Country	Notes
1	6	Lee Je-hyuk	South Korea	Q
2	3	Sun Qi	China	Q
3	11	Keiji Okamoto	Japan	
4	14	Emilio Redondo	Spain	

Heat 4

Rank	Bib	Name	Country	Notes
1	2	Ben Tudhope	Australia	Q
2	7	Joe Pleban	United States	Q
3	10	Philippe Nadreau	Canada	
4	15	Fubuki Ushiroda	Japan	

==== Semifinals ====
Heat 1

Rank	Bib	Name	Country	Notes
1	1	Emanuel Perathoner	Italy	Q
2	8	Alex Massie	Canada	Q
3	4	Keith Gabel	United States	
4	13	Zach Miller	United States	

Heat 2

Rank	Bib	Name	Country	Notes
1	2	Ben Tudhope	Australia	Q
2	6	Lee Je-hyuk	South Korea	Q
3	3	Sun Qi	China	
4	7	Joe Pleban	United States	

==== Finals ====
Small final

Rank	Bib	Name	Country	Notes
5	4	Keith Gabel	United States	
6	13	Zach Miller	United States	
7	3	Sun Qi	China	
8	7	Joe Pleban	United States	

Big final

Rank	Bib	Name	Country	Notes
1st place, gold medalist(s)	1	Emanuel Perathoner	Italy	
2nd place, silver medalist(s)	2	Ben Tudhope	Australia	
3rd place, bronze medalist(s)	6	Lee Je-hyuk	South Korea	
4	8	Alex Massie	Canada	

== See also ==
- Snowboarding at the 2026 Winter Olympics
