= Para snowboard at the 2026 Winter Paralympics – Women's snowboard cross =

Women's snowboard cross at the XIV Paralympic Winter Games
- Venue: Cortina Snowboard Park
- Dates: 7–8 March
- Competitors: 11 from 7 nations

Women's snowboard cross SB-LL2 at the XIV Paralympic Winter Games
- Competitors: 11 from 7 nations

Medalists
1st place, gold medalist(s)		Cécile Hernandez	France
2nd place, silver medalist(s)		Kate Delson	United States
3rd place, bronze medalist(s)		Wang Xinyu	China

The women's snowboard cross competition of the 2026 Winter Paralympics was held at the Cortina Para Snowboard Park on 7–8 March 2026.

== Snowboard cross SB-LL2 ==
The qualification was held on 7 March.

Quarterfinals to finals were held on 8 March.

=== Seeding ===
Rank	Name	Country	Run 1	Run 2	Best	Notes
1	Brenna Huckaby	United States	58.53	56.29	56.29	Q
2	Cécile Hernandez	France	59.08	57.91	57.91	Q
3	Kate Delson	United States	59.13	57.95	57.95	Q
4	Geng Yanhong	China	1:12.25	58.04	58.04	Q
5	Wang Xinyu	China	59.28	58.06	58.06	Q
6	Jaclyn Hamwey	United States	1:02.89	1:01.00	1:01.00	Q
7	Eri Sakashita	Japan	1:02.53	1:01.48	1:01.48	Q
8	Amanda Reid	Australia	1:33.36	1:05.30	1:05.30	Q
9	Hu Nianjia	China	1:10.44	1:09.00	1:09.00	Q
10	Sandrine Hamel	Canada	1:09.48	DNS	1:09.48	Q
11	Natalia Siuba-Jarosz	Poland	1:22.68	1:11.27	1:11.27	Q

=== Elimination round ===
- Q — Qualified for the next round
- RAL — Ranked last

==== Pre-heats ====
Heat 1

Rank	Bib	Name	Country	Notes
1	9	Hu Nianjia	China	
2	5	Wang Xinyu	China	
–	8	Amanda Reid	Australia	DNF

Heat 2

Rank	Bib	Name	Country	Notes
1	7	Eri Sakashita	Japan	Q
2	6	Jaclyn Hamwey	United States	Q
3	10	Sandrine Hamel	Canada	
4	11	Natalia Siuba-Jarosz	Poland	

==== Semifinals ====
Heat 1

Rank	Bib	Name	Country	Notes
1	5	Wang Xinyu	China	Q
2	9	Hu Nianjia	China	Q
3	1	Brenna Huckaby	United States	
4	4	Geng Yanhong	China	

Heat 2

Rank	Bib	Name	Country	Notes
1	2	Cécile Hernandez	France	Q
2	3	Kate Delson	United States	Q
3	6	Jaclyn Hamwey	United States	
–	7	Eri Sakashita	Japan	RAL

==== Finals ====
Small final

Rank	Bib	Name	Country	Notes
5	4	Geng Yanhong	China	
6	1	Brenna Huckaby	United States	
7	6	Jaclyn Hamwey	United States	
8	7	Eri Sakashita	Japan	

Big final

Rank	Bib	Name	Country	Notes
1st place, gold medalist(s)	2	Cécile Hernandez	France	
2nd place, silver medalist(s)	3	Kate Delson	United States	
3rd place, bronze medalist(s)	5	Wang Xinyu	China	
4	9	Hu Nianjia	China	

== See also ==
- Snowboarding at the 2026 Winter Olympics
