= Para snowboard at the 2026 Winter Paralympics =

Para snowboard at the XIV Paralympic Winter Games
- Para snowboard pictogram for the 2026 Winter Paralympics
- Venue: Cortina Para Snowboard Park
- Dates: 7–13 March
- Competitors: 82 from 28 nations

Para snowboard is one of the competitions at the 2026 Winter Paralympics in Milan and Cortina d'Ampezzo, Italy. In total, 8 medal events will be held.

== Classification ==
Para-snowboarding is divided into three classification categories.

SB-LL1
Athletes competing in the class SB-LL1 have significant impairment to one leg, such as amputation above the knee, or "a significant combined impairment in two legs", affecting their balance, their board-control and their ability to navigate uneven terrain. Athletes with amputations will use prostheses during racing. Female athletes in the category SB-LL1 at the 2026 Winter Paralympics will compete in the SB-LL2 category.
SB-LL2
Athletes competing in the class SB-LL2 have impairment to one or both legs "with less activity limitation", such as below-knee amputation.
SB-UL
Athletes competing in the class SB-UL have upper limb impairments, affecting balance.

== Medal summary ==
=== Medal table ===
The ranking in the table is based on information provided by the International Paralympic Committee (IPC) and will be consistent with IPC convention in its published medal tables. By default, the table will be ordered by the number of gold medals the athletes from a nation have won (in this context, a "nation" is an entity represented by a National Paralympic Committee). The number of silver medals is taken into consideration next and then the number of bronze medals. If nations are still tied, equal ranking is given and they are listed alphabetically by IPC country code.

* Host nation (Italy)

Rank	Nation	Gold	Silver	Bronze	Total
1	Italy*	3	0	0	3
2	China	2	2	2	6
2	United States	2	2	2	6
4	France	1	0	0	1
5	Australia	0	1	1	2
5	Switzerland	0	1	1	2
7	Japan	0	1	0	1
7	Netherlands	0	1	0	1
9	Canada	0	0	1	1
9	South Korea	0	0	1	1
Totals (10 entries)		8	8	8	24

=== Women's events ===
Event	Class	Gold		Silver		Bronze	
Banked slalom	SB-LL2	Kate Delson; United States	1:02.99	Lisa Bunschoten; Netherlands	1:03.53	Brenna Huckaby; United States	1:03.98
Snowboard cross	SB-LL2	Cécile Hernandez; France		Kate Delson; United States		Wang Xinyu; China	

=== Men's events ===
Event	Class	Gold		Silver		Bronze	
Banked slalom	SB-LL1	Noah Elliott; United States	58.94	Daichi Oguri; Japan	59.02	Mike Schultz; United States	1:00.05
Banked slalom	SB-LL2	Emanuel Perathoner; Italy	54.28	Fabrice von Grünigen; Switzerland	56.29	Ben Tudhope; Australia	57.33
Banked slalom	SB-UL	Jacopo Luchini; Italy	56.28	Wang Pengyao; China	56.62	Jiang Zihao; China	57.03
Snowboard cross	SB-LL1	Wu Zhongwei; China		Noah Elliott; United States		Tyler Turner; Canada	
Snowboard cross	SB-LL2	Emanuel Perathoner; Italy		Ben Tudhope; Australia		Lee Je-hyuk; South Korea	
Snowboard cross	SB-UL	Ji Lijia; China		Zhu Yonggang; China		Aron Fahrni; Switzerland	

== Participating nations ==
- Australia (4)
- Austria (3)
- Brazil (2)
- Canada (5)
- China (12)
- Croatia (1)
- Finland (1)
- France (2)
- Georgia (1)
- Germany (1)
- Great Britain (5)
- Greece (1)
- Italy (5)
- Japan (7)
- Lithuania (1)
- Montenegro (1)
- Netherlands (3)
- Norway (1)
- Poland (1)
- Portugal (1)
- Romania (1)
- Russia (2)
- Slovakia (1)
- South Korea (3)
- Spain (1)
- Switzerland (3)
- Ukraine (1)
- United States (9)

== See also ==
- Snowboarding at the 2026 Winter Olympics
