= Switzerland at the 2026 Winter Paralympics =

- Flag of Switzerland
- IPC code: SUI
- NPC: Swiss Paralympic Committee

in Milan & Cortina d'Ampezzo, Italy 6 March 2026 – 15 March 2026
- Competitors: 9 (9 men) in 4 sports
- Medals Ranked 14th: Gold 2 Silver 2 Bronze 2 Total 6

Winter Paralympics appearances (overview)
- 1976; 1980; 1984; 1988; 1992; 1994; 1998; 2002; 2006; 2010; 2014; 2018; 2022; 2026

Switzerland will compete at the 2026 Winter Paralympics in Milan & Cortina d'Ampezzo, Italy, which will take place between 6–15 March 2026.

== Medallists ==
Medal	Name	Sport	Event	Date
Gold	Robin Cuche	Para alpine skiing	Men's downhill, standing	7 March
Gold	Robin Cuche	Para alpine skiing	Men's super-G, standing	9 March
Silver	Fabrice van Grünigen	Para snowboard	Men's banked slalom, SB-LL2	13 March
Silver	Robin Cuche	Para alpine skiing	Men's giant slalom, standing	13 March
Bronze	Aron Fahrni	Para snowboard	Men's snowboard cross, SB-UL	8 March
Bronze	Robin Cuche	Para alpine skiing	Men's slalom, standing	15 March

Medals by sport
Sport	1st place, gold medalist(s)	2nd place, silver medalist(s)	3rd place, bronze medalist(s)	Total
Para alpine skiing	2	1	1	4
Para snowboard	0	1	1	2
Total	2	2	2	6

Medals by date
Day	Date	1st place, gold medalist(s)	2nd place, silver medalist(s)	3rd place, bronze medalist(s)	Total
Day 1	7 March	1	0	0	1
Day 2	8 March	0	0	1	1
Day 3	9 March	1	0	o	1
Day 4	10 March	0	0	0	0
Day 5	11 March	0	0	0	0
Day 6	12 March	0	0	0	0
Day 7	13 March	0	2	0	2
Day 8	14 March	0	0	0	0
Day 9	15 March	0	0	1	1
Total		2	2	2	6

Medals by gender
Gender	1st place, gold medalist(s)	2nd place, silver medalist(s)	3rd place, bronze medalist(s)	Total
Female	0	0	0	0
Male	2	2	2	6
Mixed	0	0	0	0
Total	2	2	2	6

== Competitors ==
The following is the list of number of competitors participating at the Games per sport/discipline.

Sport	Men	Women	Total
Para alpine skiing	6	0	6
Para biathlon	1	0	1
Para cross-country skiing	1	0	1
Para snowboard	2	0	2
Total	9	0	9

== Para alpine skiing ==
Athlete	Class	Event	Run 1		Run 2		Total	
Athlete	Class	Event	Time	Rank	Time	Rank	Time	Rank
Pascal Christen	LW10–2	Men's downhill, sitting	—N/a				DNF	
Pascal Christen	LW10–2	Men's super-G, sitting	—N/a				1:17.37	10
Pascal Christen	LW10–2	Men's giant slalom, sitting	1:10.77	9	1:11.93	8	2:22.70	8
Pascal Christen	LW10–2	Men's slalom, sitting	DNF					
Pascal Christen	LW10–2	Men's super combined, sitting	DNF					
Robin Cuche	LW9–1	Men's downhill, standing	—N/a				1:17.79	1st place, gold medalist(s)
Robin Cuche	LW9–1	Men's super-G, standing	—N/a				1:12.12	1st place, gold medalist(s)
Robin Cuche	LW9–1	Men's giant slalom, standing	1:04.36	2	1:05.36	2	2:09.72	2nd place, silver medalist(s)
Robin Cuche	LW9–1	Men's slalom, standing	48.34	6	43.39	3	1:31.73	3rd place, bronze medalist(s)
Robin Cuche	LW9–1	Men's super combined, standing	DNF					
Christophe Damas	LW12–1	Men's downhill, sitting	—N/a				DNF	
Christophe Damas	LW12–1	Men's super-G, sitting	—N/a				1:23.32	19
Christophe Damas	LW12–1	Men's giant slalom, sitting	1:15.57	16	1:12.74	9	2:28.31	13
Christophe Damas	LW12–1	Men's slalom, sitting	54.43	14	48.01	12	1:42.44	13
Christophe Damas	LW12–1	Men's super combined, sitting	1:24.30	17	DNF			
Theo Gmür	LW9–1	Men's downhill, standing	—N/a				1:20.04	6
Theo Gmür	LW9–1	Men's super-G, standing	—N/a				1:16.22	13
Theo Gmür	LW9–1	Men's giant slalom, standing	1:08.13	7	1:09.66	12	2:17.79	10
Theo Gmür	LW9–1	Men's slalom, standing	53.37	17	48.83	16	1:42.20	17
Ueli Rotach	LW3	Men's super-G, standing	—N/a				1:29.46	26
Ueli Rotach	LW3	Men's giant slalom, standing	1:23.05	28	1:24.65	26	2:47.70	26
Emerick Sierro	LW9–2	Men's downhill, standing	—N/a				1:23.47	16
Emerick Sierro	LW9–2	Men's super-G, standing	—N/a				1:17.42	15
Emerick Sierro	LW9–2	Men's giant slalom, standing	1:09.37	12	1:08.35	9	2:17.72	9
Emerick Sierro	LW9–2	Men's slalom, standing	52.38	16	47.63	14	1:40.01	14
Emerick Sierro	LW9–2	Men's super combined, standing	1:19.04	11	50.40	11	2:09.44	9

== Para biathlon ==
Athlete	Class	Event	Qualification			Final		
Athlete	Class	Event	Missed shots	Time	Rank	Missed shots	Time	Rank
Luca Tavasci	LW8	Men's individual, standing	—N/a			6	39:18.0	15
Luca Tavasci	LW8	Men's sprint, standing	—N/a			4	21:52.3	17
Luca Tavasci	LW8	Men's sprint pursuit, standing	4	12:40.4	17 Q	3	16:10.1	16

== Para cross-country skiing ==
Athlete	Class	Event	Qualification		Semifinal		Final	
Athlete	Class	Event	Time	Rank	Time	Rank	Time	Rank
Luca Tavasci	LW8	Men's sprint classical, standing	2:57.55	26	Did not advance			
Luca Tavasci	LW8	Men's 20 km freestyle, standing	—N/a				48:22.8	17

== Para snowboard ==
Banked slalom

Athlete	Event	Run 1	Run 2	Best	Rank
Aron Fahrni	Men's banked slalom, SB-UL	57.17	57.38	57.17	5
Fabrice von Grünigen	Men's banked slalom, SB-LL2	56.29	56.37	56.29	2nd place, silver medalist(s)

Snowboard cross

Athlete	Event	Seeding		1/8 final	Quarterfinal	Semifinal	Final	
Athlete	Event	Time	Rank	Position	Position	Position	Position	Rank
Aron Fahrni	Men's snowboard cross, SB-UL	52.83	6	—N/a	2	2	3	3rd place, bronze medalist(s)
Fabrice von Grünigen	Men's snowboard cross, SB-LL2	DNS		—N/a	DNS	Did not advance		

== See also ==
- Switzerland at the Paralympics
- Switzerland at the 2026 Winter Olympics
