= Jackie Hamwey =

American paralympic snowboarder (born 1989)

Jaclyn Hamwey
Personal information
- Born: 28 March 1989 (age 37)
- Home town: Boston, United States
- Education: Northeastern University

Sport
- Country: United States
- Sport: Para snowboarding
- Disability class: SB-LL2
- Club: Team Utah Snowboarding
Medal record
Representing United States
Women's para snowboarding
World Championships
Bronze medal – third place	2025 Big White	SB-LL2 Dual Banked Slalom

Jaclyn "Jackie" Hamwey (born 28 March 1989) is an American para snowboarding athlete. She competes in the LL2 classification, which includes athletes with lower limb impairments. She competed for United States in the women's snowboard cross and banked slalom events at the 2026 Winter Paralympics in Milan–Cortina.

== Early and personal life ==
Jaclyn "Jackie" Hamwey was born on 28 March 1989. She grew up in Boston and attended Lincoln-Sudbury Regional High School, where she participated in multiple varsity sports including snowboarding and softball. She later studied at the Northeastern University.

In July 2016, Hamwey sustained severe injuries in a boating accident at Stage Harbor in Chatham, Massachusetts, when her right leg was drawn into a motorboat propeller. The injuries resulted in a below-knee amputation of her right leg. Before taking up para-snowboarding, she worked as a biotechnology scientist at Quanterix, a diagnostics company based in Massachusetts. Hamwey identifies as queer, and is in a homosexual relationship with Julianne Gavin.

== Career ==
Hamwey had snowboarded since she was thirteen, but only began pursuing the sport competitively after her amputation. She relocated to Utah and joined Team Utah Snowboarding to train full-time in para snowboarding. She competes using Versafoot, a customized prosthetic leg designed by fellow para snowboarder Mike Schultz, which has additional impact absorbing features. She competes in the LL2 classification, which includes athletes with lower limb impairments.

Hamwey began competing in International Ski and Snowboard Federation (FIS) para snowboard events from early 2024. She recorded podium finishes in North American Cup competitions in snowboard cross and banked slalom during 2024. She took part in several European and North American Snowboard Cup competitions in the banked slalom and snowboard cross events. She secured her first podium when she registered a third place finish in the North American Snowboard Cup held in Big White Ski Resort in March 2024. She placed third in women's banked slalom SB-LL2 event at the 2025 World Para Snowboard Championships. She consistently started recording top ten finishes in several FIS events in 2025.

On 24 February 2026, Hamwey was named to the United States team for the 2026 Winter Paralympics in Milan–Cortina. She was part of a three member para snowboarding team along with Brenna Huckaby and Kate Delson. At the Paralympics, she competed in the SB-LL2 women's snowboard cross and banked slalom events.

In the snowboard cross event held on 8 March 2026, Hamwey made it through the heats before her competition ended in the small-final. She finished seventh overall amongst the 11 competitors. In the banked slalom event held on 13 March 2026, Hamwey finished ninth out of the 13 competitors with a time of one minute and 11.73 seconds. She took 7.26 seconds more than her compatriot Delson, who won the gold medal.
