= Snowboard at the 2022 Winter Paralympics – Women's snowboard cross =

Women's snowboard cross at the XIII Paralympic Winter Games
- Paralympic alpine skiing
- Venue: Genting Snow Park
- Dates: 6–7 March
- Competitors: 13 from 6 nations

Women's snowboard cross SB-LL2 at the XIII Paralympic Winter Games
- Competitors: 13 from 6 nations

Medalists
| 1st place, gold medalist(s) | | Cécile Hernandez | France |
| 2nd place, silver medalist(s) | | Lisa DeJong | Canada |
| 3rd place, bronze medalist(s) | | Brenna Huckaby | United States |

The women's snowboard cross competition of the 2022 Winter Paralympics was held at Genting Snow Park on 6–7 March 2022.

== Snowboard cross SB-LL2 ==
The qualification was held on 6 March.

Quarterfinals to finals were held on 7 March.

=== Qualification ===
| Rank | Name | Country | Run 1 | Run 2 | Best | Notes |
|---|---|---|---|---|---|---|
| 1 | Cécile Hernandez | France | 1:10.17 | 1:08.38 | 1:08.38 | Q |
| 2 | Brenna Huckaby | United States | DSQ | 1:11.13 | 1:11.13 | Q |
| 3 | Lisa Bunschoten | Netherlands | 1:12.09 | 1:12.63 | 1:12.09 | Q |
| 4 | Lisa DeJong | Canada | 1:13.25 | 1:12.22 | 1:12.22 | Q |
| 5 | Brittani Coury | United States | 1:16.49 | 1:13.04 | 1:13.04 | Q |
| 6 | Li Tiantian | China | 1:18.47 | 1:14.76 | 1:14.76 | Q |
| 7 | Geng Yanhong | China | 1:17.39 | 1:16.36 | 1:16.36 | Q |
| 8 | Sandrine Hamel | Canada | 1:17.69 | 1:18.40 | 1:17.69 | Q |
| 9 | Romy Tschopp | Switzerland | 1:18.14 | 1:27.72 | 1:18.14 | Q |
| 10 | Hu Nianjia | China | 1:32.74 | 1:20.67 | 1:20.67 | Q |
| 11 | Wang Xinyu | China | 1:21.15 | 1:44.34 | 1:21.15 | Q |
| 12 | Renske van Beek | Netherlands | DNF | 1:25.99 | 1:25.99 | Q |
| 13 | Katlyn Maddry | United States | 1:32.38 | 1:27.63 | 1:27.63 | Q |

==== Quarterfinals ====
Heat 1

| Rank | Name | Country | Notes |
|---|---|---|---|
| 1 | Cécile Hernandez | France | Q |
| 2 | Sandrine Hamel | Canada | Q |
| 3 | Romy Tschopp | Switzerland | |

Heat 2

| Rank | Name | Country | Notes |
|---|---|---|---|
| 1 | Lisa DeJong | Canada | Q |
| 2 | Brittani Coury | United States | Q |
| 3 | Katlyn Maddry | United States | |
| 4 | Renske van Beek | Netherlands | |

Heat 3

| Rank | Name | Country | Notes |
|---|---|---|---|
| 1 | Lisa Bunschoten | Netherlands | Q |
| 2 | Li Tiantian | China | Q |
| 3 | Wang Xinyu | China | |

Heat 4

| Rank | Name | Country | Notes |
|---|---|---|---|
| 1 | Brenna Huckaby | United States | Q |
| 2 | Hu Nianjia | China | Q |
| 3 | Geng Yanhong | China | |

==== Semifinals ====
Heat 1

| Rank | Name | Country | Notes |
|---|---|---|---|
| 1 | Cécile Hernandez | France | Q |
| 2 | Lisa DeJong | Canada | Q |
| 3 | Brittani Coury | United States | |
| 4 | Sandrine Hamel | Canada | |

Heat 2

| Rank | Name | Country | Notes |
|---|---|---|---|
| 1 | Lisa Bunschoten | Netherlands | Q |
| 2 | Brenna Huckaby | United States | Q |
| 3 | Hu Nianjia | China | |
| 4 | Li Tiantian | China | |

==== Finals ====
Small final

| Rank | Name | Country | Notes |
|---|---|---|---|
| 5 | Brittani Coury | United States | |
| 6 | Li Tiantian | China | |
| 7 | Hu Nianjia | China | |
| 8 | Sandrine Hamel | Canada | |

Big final

| Rank | Name | Country | Notes |
|---|---|---|---|
| 1st place, gold medalist(s) | Cécile Hernandez | France | |
| 2nd place, silver medalist(s) | Lisa DeJong | Canada | |
| 3rd place, bronze medalist(s) | Brenna Huckaby | United States | |
| 4 | Lisa Bunschoten | Netherlands | DNF |

== See also ==
- Snowboarding at the 2022 Winter Olympics
