= Snowboard at the 2022 Winter Paralympics – Women's banked slalom =

Women's banked slalom at the XIII Paralympic Winter Games
- Paralympic snowboarding
- Venue: Genting Snow Park
- Dates: 11 March

Men's banked slalom SB-LL2 at the XII Paralympic Winter Games
- Competitors: 14 from 7 nations

Medalists
1st place, gold medalist(s)		Brenna Huckaby	United States
2nd place, silver medalist(s)		Geng Yanhong	China
3rd place, bronze medalist(s)		Li Tiantian	China

The women's banked slalom competition of the 2022 Winter Paralympics was held at Genting Snow Park on 11 March 2022.

== Banked slalom SB-LL2 ==
Rank	Bib	Name	Country	Run 1	Run 2	Best
1st place, gold medalist(s)	8	Brenna Huckaby	United States	1:18.13	1:17.28	1:17.28
2nd place, silver medalist(s)	3	Geng Yanhong	China	1:19.16	1:17.38	1:17.38
3rd place, bronze medalist(s)	11	Li Tiantian	China	1:18.77	1:17.46	1:17.46
4	5	Hu Nianjia	China	1:18.05	1:19.02	1:18.05
5	13	Wang Xinyu	China	1:18.62	1:18.31	1:18.31
6	7	Cécile Hernandez	France	1:19.39	1:18.48	1:18.48
7	2	Lisa Bunschoten	Netherlands	1:19.02	1:19.00	1:19.00
8	1	Lisa DeJong	Canada	1:21.62	1:20.19	1:20.19
9	9	Brittani Coury	United States	1:51.34	1:22.30	1:22.30
10	4	Sandrine Hamel	Canada	1:23.05	1:22.86	1:22.86
11	6	Renske van Beek	Netherlands	1:23.26	1:23.35	1:23.26
12	10	Romy Tschopp	Switzerland	1:25.08	1:24.77	1:24.77
13	14	Sedigheh Rouzbeh	Iran	3:36.49	DNS	—N/a
	12	Katlyn Maddry	United States	DNS	—N/a	

== See also ==
- Snowboarding at the 2022 Winter Olympics
