= Best Athlete with a Disability ESPY Award =

Annual athletic award (2002–2024)

- Awarded for: best disabled athlete
- Location: Los Angeles (2004)
- Presented by: ESPN
- First award: 2002
- Final award: 2024
- Currently held by: Declan Farmer (USA)
- Website: www.espn.co.uk/espys/

The Best Athlete with a Disability ESPY Award (sometimes called the Outstanding Athlete with a Disability ESPY Award) is an annual award honoring the achievements of an athlete from the world of disabled sports. It was first presented as part of the ESPY Awards at the 2002 edition as part of the ceremony's tenth anniversary of its establishment. The Best Athlete with a Disability ESPY Award trophy, designed by sculptor Lawrence Nowlan, was presented to the disabled sportsperson adjudged to be the best at the annual ESPY Awards ceremony in Los Angeles. For the 2004 ceremony, the winner was chosen by online voting through choices selected by the ESPN Select Nominating Committee. Before that, determination of the winners was made by an panel of experts. Through the 2001 iteration of the ESPY Awards, ceremonies were conducted in February of each year to honor achievements over the previous calendar year; awards presented thereafter are conferred in July and reflect performance from the June previous. (Note: Because of the rescheduling of the ESPY Awards ceremony, the award presented in 2002 was given in consideration of performance betwixt February 2001 and June 2002.)

The inaugural winner of the Best Athlete with a Disability ESPY Award at the 2002 edition was mountain climber Erik Weihenmayer who has a total visual impairment and he became the first blind person to reach the summit of Mount Everest in May 2001. He is one of three people to have won the award during its three-year history; sprinter Marlon Shirley won the accolade at the 2003 ceremony for becoming the first amputee in history to set a time below eleven seconds in the men's 100 metres at the Utah Summer Games, and Kyle Maynard was voted the winner of the award in the 2004 iteration because of his strong form in freestyle wrestling in high school despite being born with congenital amputation that resulted in the shortening of all his limbs. The Best Athlete with a Disability ESPY Award was discontinued and bifurcated by gender in 2005 to establish the Best Male Athlete with a Disability ESPY Award and the Best Female Athlete with a Disability ESPY Award. The award was reinstated in 2023.

== Winners and nominees ==
Best Athlete with a Disability ESPY Award winners and nominees
Year	Image	Athlete	Nationality	Sport	Nominees	Refs
2002	Erik Weihenmayer on Mt. Sherman in 2016	Erik Weihenmayer	USA	Mountain climbing	Stephen Pate (USA) – Wheelchair rugby Sarah Will (USA) – Skiing	
2003	–	Marlon Shirley	USA	Track and field	Paul Schulte (USA) – Wheelchair basketball Esther Vergeer (NED) – Wheelchair tennis	
2004	Kyle Maynard in 2012	Kyle Maynard	USA	Freestyle wrestling	Cheri Blauwet (USA) – Wheelchair racing Travis Mohr (USA) – Swimming; Ron Williams (USA) – Cycling	
2023	–	Zach Miller	USA	Snowboarding	Erica McKee (USA) – Sledge hockey Aaron Pike (USA) – Wheelchair racing Susannah Scaroni (USA) – Wheelchair racing	
2024	–	Brenna Huckaby	USA	Snowboarding	Jaydin Blackwell (USA) – Sprinter; Ezra Frech (USA) – Track and field Oksana Masters (USA) – Cross-country skiing	
2025	–	Noah Elliott	USA	Snowboarding	Tatyana McFadden (USA) – Track and field Ezra Frech (USA) – Track and field Grace Norman (USA) – Paratriathlon	
2026	Declan Farmer in 2015	Declan Farmer	USA	Sledge hockey	Jake Adicoff (USA) – Nordic skiing Oksana Masters (USA) – Cross-country skiing Susannah Scaroni (USA) – Wheelchair racing	

== See also ==
- United States Olympic Committee Paralympian of the Year Award
- Laureus World Sports Award for Sportsperson of the Year with a Disability
