= Lithuania at the 2026 Winter Paralympics =

- Flag of Lithuania
- IPC code: LTU
- NPC: Lithuanian Paralympic Committee

in Milan & Cortina d'Ampezzo, Italy 6 March 2026 – 15 March 2026
- Competitors: 1 (1 man) in 1 sport
- Medals: Gold 0 Silver 0 Bronze 0 Total 0

Winter Paralympics appearances (overview)
- 1994; 1998–2022; 2026

Other related appearances
- Soviet Union (1988)

Lithuania will compete at the 2026 Winter Paralympics in Milan & Cortina d'Ampezzo, Italy, which will take place between 6–15 March 2026.

== Competitors ==
The following is the list of number of competitors participating at the Games per sport/discipline.

Sport	Men	Women	Total
Para snowboard	1	0	1
Total	1	0	1

== Para snowboard ==
Banked slalom

Athlete	Event	Run 1	Run 2	Best	Rank
Rapolas Micevičius	Men's banked slalom, SB-LL2	1:00.10	1:00.59	1:00.10	13

Snowboard cross

Athlete	Event	Seeding		1/8 final	Quarterfinal	Semifinal	Final	
Athlete	Event	Time	Rank	Position	Position	Position	Position	Rank
Rapolas Micevičius	Men's snowboard cross, SB-LL2	52.51	9	3	Did not advance			

== See also ==
- Lithuania at the Paralympics
- Lithuania at the 2026 Winter Olympics
