= Georgia Gunew =

Australian Paralympic skier

Personal information
- Nationality: Australia
- Born: 1 September 2003 (age 22) South Brisbane, Queensland

Sport
- Country: Australia

Georgia Gunew (born 1 September 2003) is an Australian para skier with a vision impairment. She competed at the 2026 Winter Paralympics.

== Personal ==
She was born on 1 September 2003 in South Brisbane, Queensland. At the age of ten, her vision started to deteriorate and was diagnosed with the genetic condition Stargardt's macular dystrophy. Since the age of fifteen, she is legally blind. In 2025, she was completing a Bachelor of Agribusiness at University of Queensland's Gatton Campus. In 2026, she lives in Gumdale, Queensland.

== Skiing ==
Prior to her diagnosis, she was a competitive field hockey player. At the age of sixteen, she took up para skiing but this was placed on hold during COVID. She joined the Australian Para-Alpine Team in 2023. In the 2024-25 international season, she won two medals, in slalom and giant slalom.

At the 2026 Winter Paralympics, she finished 11th in the Women's Slalom - Visually Impaired and 10th in the Women's Giant Slalom - Visually Impaired. Her sighted guide was Ethan Jackson.

She is a Queensland Academy of Sport scholarship athlete.

== Recognition ==
- 2024 - Snow Australia's Female Para Alpine Athlete of the Year
- 2025 - Snow Australia's Female Para Alpine Athlete of the Year
- 2026 - Winter Paralympic Games Opening Flag Bearer with Ben Tudhope.
- 2026 - Snow Australia's Female Para Alpine Athlete of the Year
