= Dean van Kooij =

Dutch para-snowboarder (born 2002)

Personal information
- Born: 19 December 2002 (age 23) Nijmegen, Netherlands

Sport
- Country: Netherlands
- Sport: Para-snowboarding
- Disability class: SB-UL
- Events: Snowboard cross, Banked slalom

Achievements and titles
- Paralympic finals: Milan-Cortina 2026

Dean van Kooij (born 19 December 2002) is a Dutch para-snowboarder. He represented the Netherlands at the 2026 Winter Paralympics.

== Biography ==
=== Early life ===
Van Kooij was born in Nijmegen, Netherlands. In 2017 he moved with his family to Pichilemu in Chile, where he spent two years surfing and skateboarding while following online education from the Netherlands.

In 2019, shortly after returning to the Netherlands, he was hit by a car while cycling near his home. The accident caused severe injuries and left his left arm paralysed after several nerves in his neck were damaged.

After weeks in hospital and a long rehabilitation period, Van Kooij looked for a new sport. During a Paralympic talent day at the National Sports Centre Papendal he discovered para-snowboarding, a sport that suited him because of his background in surfing and other board sports.

=== Career ===
Van Kooij began competing in para-snowboarding in 2021 and quickly showed potential, winning his first competition shortly after starting the sport.

He later began competing internationally in snowboard cross and banked slalom events in the SB-UL classification. At the 2023 World Championships in La Molina, Spain, he finished sixth in the dual banked slalom and tenth in snowboard cross.

Van Kooij qualified for the 2026 Winter Paralympics in Milan and Cortina d'Ampezzo. At his Paralympic debut he finished fifth in the men's snowboard cross SB-UL event and eighth in the banked slalom event.

== Results ==
=== Paralympic Games ===
Year	Venue	Results
2026	Italy Cortina d'Ampezzo	5th Snowboard cross SB-UL; 8th Banked slalom SB-UL

=== World Championships ===
Year	Venue	Results
2022	Norway Lillehammer	11th Banked slalom SB-UL
2023	Spain La Molina	6th Dual banked slalom SB-UL; 10th Snowboard cross SB-UL
2025	Canada Big White	11th Banked slalom SB-UL; 12th Snowboard cross SB-UL
