= Emanuel Perathoner =

Italian snowboarder

Personal information
- Nationality: Italian
- Born: 12 May 1986 (age 40) Bozen, Italy
- Height: 1.79 m (5 ft 10 in)
- Weight: 77 kg (170 lb)

Sport
- Country: Italy
- Sport: Snowboarding
- Event: Snowboard cross
- Club: CS Esercito
Medal record
Men's para snowboarding
Representing Italy
Winter Paralympic Games
Gold medal – first place	2026 Milano Cortina	Snowboard cross
Gold medal – first place	2026 Milano Cortina	Banked slalom
World Championships
Bronze medal – third place	2019 Utah	Snowboard cross

Emanuel Perathoner (born 12 May 1986) is an Italian snowboarder and para snowboarder. He is the second-ever athlete to compete at both the Winter Olympics and Paralympics.

Perathoner represented Italy at the 2014 and 2018 Winter Olympics. He won a bronze medal at the FIS Freestyle Ski and Snowboarding World Championships 2019.

In 2021, Perathoner suffered a serious injury during training, sustaining multiple fractures in his left leg, after which he underwent total knee replacement. He made his para snowboard debut in late 2022.

He won the gold medal in the snowboard cross competition at the 2026 Winter Paralympics.

== See also ==
- List of athletes who have competed in the Paralympics and Olympics
