= Lisa DeJong =

Canadian Paralympic snowboarder

Personal information
- Born: May 12, 1989 (age 37) Saskatoon, Saskatchewan, Canada
Medal record
Women's para snowboarding
Representing Canada
Winter Paralympic Games
Silver medal – second place	2022 Beijing	Snowboard cross
World Para Snow Sports Championships
Gold medal – first place	2021 Lillehammer	Team event
Silver medal – second place	2021 Lillehammer	Dual banked slalom
Silver medal – second place	2021 Lillehammer	Snowboard cross

Lisa DeJong (born May 12, 1989) is a Canadian retired para-snowboarder who competed in the SB-LL2 category. She won Canada's first Winter Paralympic medal at the 2022 Winter Paralympics, and retired on October 10, 2023.

== Life and career ==
DeJong won the silver medal in the women's dual banked slalom at the 2021 World Para Snow Sports Championships held in Lillehammer, Norway. She also won the silver medal in the women's snowboard cross event. DeJong and Sandrine Hamel also won the gold medal in the women's team event.

She qualified to compete in snowboarding at the 2022 Winter Paralympics in Beijing, China. She won the silver medal in the women's snowboard cross SB-LL2 event. She also competed in the women's banked slalom SB-LL2 event.

== Personal life ==
DeJong is married and has two daughters.
