= Zach Miller (snowboarder) =

American snowboarder (born 1999)

Personal information
- Full name: Zachary Miller
- Nationality: American
- Born: March 10, 1999 (age 27) Colorado, United States

Sport
- Sport: Para snowboarding
- Disability class: SB-LL2

Achievements and titles
- Paralympic finals: Beijing 2022, Milano-Cortina 2026
Medal record
Men's Para snowboarding
Representing United States
World Para Snowboard Championships
Gold medal – first place	2022 Lillehammer	Banked slalom SB-LL2
Silver medal – second place	2023 La Molina	Dual banked slalom SB-LL2
Bronze medal – third place	2019 Pyhä	Snowboard cross SB-LL2
Bronze medal – third place	2023 La Molina	Snowboard cross SB-LL2
Bronze medal – third place	2025 Big White	Banked slalom SB-LL2

Zachary Miller (born March 10, 1999) is an American para snowboarder who competes in the SB-LL2 classification. He has represented the United States in international competition, including the 2022 Winter Paralympics in Beijing and 2026 Winter Paralympics in Milano-Cortina.

He became World Champion in 2022. In 2023 he won the Best Athlete with a Disability ESPY Award.

== Biography ==
=== Career ===
Miller was born in the U.S. state of Colorado. He was diagnosed with left hemiplegic cerebral palsy at six months old, a condition that affects the connection between the brain and muscles and can limit muscle growth. As a child he received regular physical therapy at Children’s Hospital in Denver, where he was introduced to sports through a youth activity program.

He first experienced snow sports while taking ski lessons in Colorado and later switched to snowboarding after watching other riders on the mountain. Drawn to the speed and competitive aspects of the sport, he began focusing on snowboard racing and eventually progressed to international competition.

Miller joined the United States Para Snowboard Team in 2018 and soon became one of the top competitors in his classification. Over the following years he won multiple medals at the World Para Snowboard Championships, including a world title in banked slalom at the 2022 championships in Lillehammer.

He made his Paralympic debut at the 2022 Winter Paralympics in Beijing, where he competed in snowboard cross and banked slalom events. An injury during the Games affected his results, but he later returned to form and continued to record podium finishes on the international circuit.

=== Personal life ===
Miller has worked with Adaptive Action Sports to help introduce new athletes to adaptive snowboarding. He is also known for interests such as gaming and motorcycle riding while continuing to compete at the highest level of the sport.

==== Truck fire rescue ====
In 2024, Miller helped stop a vehicle fire while riding his motorcycle through Parleys Canyon in Utah. During his commute to a snowboarding training session, he noticed smoke coming from a pickup truck traveling on the highway next to him. Miller signaled to the driver that the vehicle was on fire, prompting the driver to pull over. After stopping, the two opened the hood of the truck and used water bottles to extinguish the flames coming from the wheel well before the fire could spread further.

== Results ==
=== Paralympic Games ===
Year	Venue	Event	Result
2022	China Beijing	Snowboard cross SB-LL2	9th
2022	China Beijing	Banked slalom SB-LL2	15th

=== World Championships ===
Year	Venue	Event	Result
2017	Canada Big White	Snowboard cross SB-LL2	12th
2017	Canada Big White	Banked slalom SB-LL2	9th
2019	Finland Pyhä	Snowboard cross SB-LL2	3rd
2019	Finland Pyhä	Banked slalom SB-LL2	9th
2022	Norway Lillehammer	Banked slalom SB-LL2	1st
2022	Norway Lillehammer	Snowboard cross SB-LL2	11th
2023	Spain La Molina	Dual banked slalom SB-LL2	2nd
2023	Spain La Molina	Snowboard cross SB-LL2	3rd
2025	Canada Big White	Banked slalom SB-LL2	3rd
2025	Canada Big White	Snowboard cross SB-LL2	4th
