= Aaron McCarthy (snowboarder) =

Australian Paralympic snowboarder

Personal information
- Nationality: Australia
- Born: 18 March 1994 (age 32)

Sport
- Country: Australia
- Sport: Para-snowboarding
- Disability class: SB-LL1

Aaron McCarthy (born 18 March 1994) is an Australian Paralympian who competed for Australia in para-snowboarding at the 2026 Winter Paralympics.

== Personal ==
On 14 December 2021, as a barley farmer, his left leg was caught in a harvester. He saved his own life by tourniqueting his leg with a shirt and calling emergency services and his wife. His left leg was amputated above the knee. He is married to Tahnee and they have three children. In 2026, he continues to work on his farm just outside the Riverina town of The Rock.

== Snowboarding ==
McCarthy learnt to snowboard in 2022 alongside Paralympian Joany Badenhorst in Thredbo as part of his rehabilitation. In 2023, he attended para snowboard development camp run by Snow Australia and Disabled Wintersport Australia (DWA). McCarthy debuted for Australia during the 2024–25 European winter season and winning the European Cup overall standings for his classification.

In January 2026, he suffered a collarbone injury in a crash at the Para Snowboard World Cup in Canada leaving him just short of selection for the 2026 Winter Paralympics.

At the 2026 Winter Paralympics, he finished 12th in the Snowboard Cross SB-LL1 and 13th in the Snowboard Banked SB-LL1. In 2026, he was awarded Paralympics Australia Rookie of the Year.
