= Sandrine Hamel =

Canadian Paralympic snowboarder (born 1997)

Personal information
- Born: August 21, 1997 (age 28) Montreal, Quebec, Canada

Sport
- Disability: Scoliosis
Medal record
Women's para snowboarding
Representing Canada
World Para Snow Sports Championships
Gold medal – first place	2021 Lillehammer	Team event
Silver medal – second place	2019 Pyha	Dual banked slalom
Bronze medal – third place	2021 Lillehammer	Dual banked slalom

Sandrine Hamel (born August 21, 1997) is a Canadian para-snowboarder who competes in the SB-LL2 category.

== Life and career ==
Hamel was born with scoliosis.

Hamel won the bronze medal in the women's dual banked slalom at the 2021 World Para Snow Sports Championships held in Lillehammer, Norway. She and Lisa DeJong also won the gold medal in the women's team event.

She competed in snowboarding at the 2022 Winter Paralympics in Beijing, China. She competed in the women's snowboard cross SB-LL2 and women's banked slalom SB-LL2 events.
