= Ben Tudhope =

Australian Paralympic snowboarder

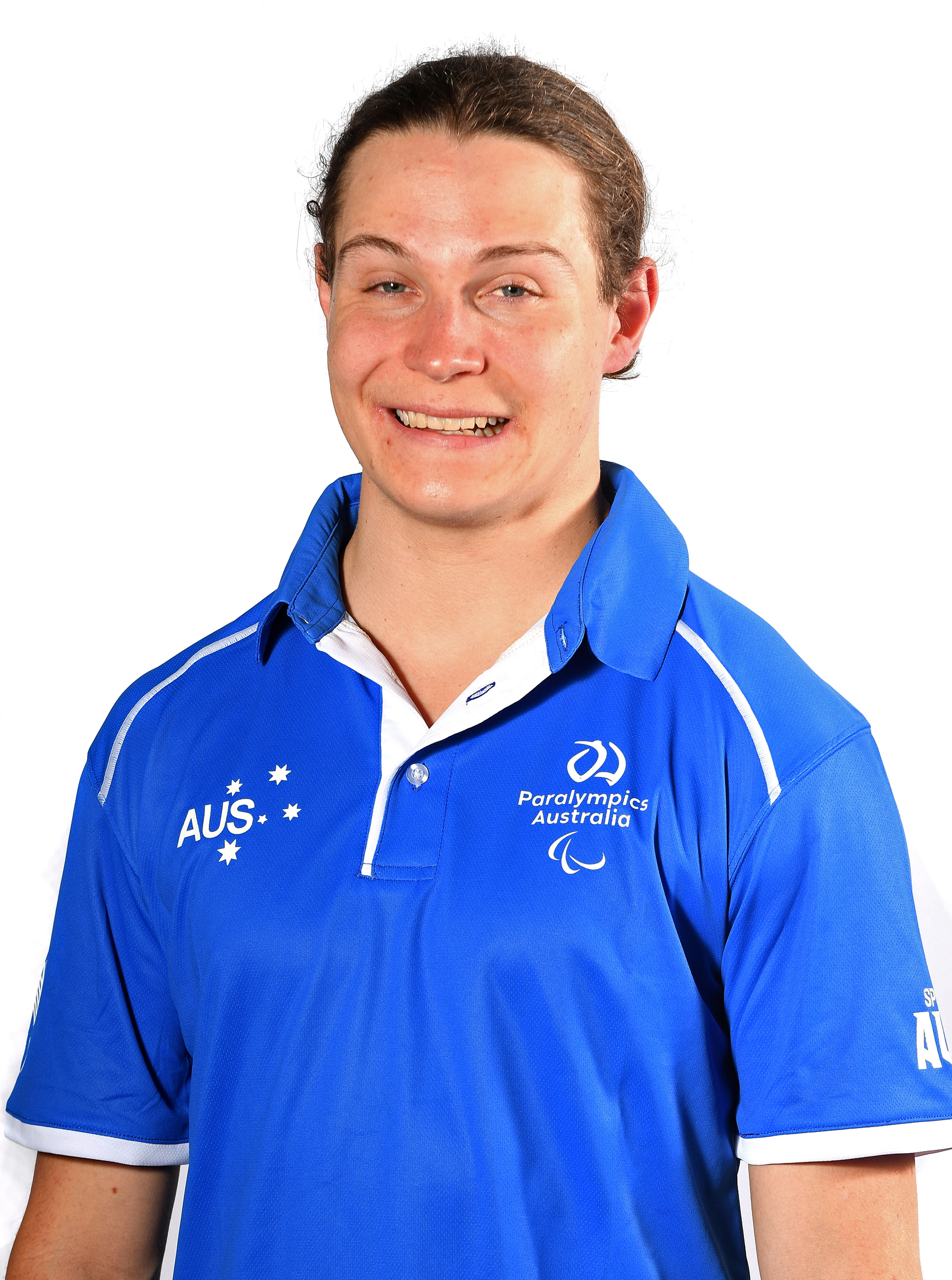
- Ben Tudhope in 2021

Personal information
- Nationality: Australian
- Born: 13 December 1999 (age 26)

Sport
- Country: Australia
- Sport: Para-snowboarding
- Disability class: SB-LL
Medal record
Men's para snowboard
Representing Australia
Winter Paralympic Games
Silver medal – second place	2026 Milano Cortina	Snowboard cross SB-LL2
Bronze medal – third place	2022 Beijing	Snowboard cross SB-LL2
Bronze medal – third place	2026 Milano Cortina	Banked slalom SB-LL2
World Championships
Silver medal – second place	2019 Pyha	Snowboard Cross
Silver medal – second place	2021 Lillehammer	Snowboard Cross
Bronze medal – third place	2021 Lillehammer	Dual Banked Slalom
Gold medal – first place	2023 La Molina	Snowboard Cross
Bronze medal – third place	2023 La Molina	Dual Banked Slalom
Bronze medal – third place	2025 Big White	Snowboard Cross
Winter X Games
Bronze medal – third place	2016 Aspen	Snowboarder X Adaptive

Ben Tudhope (born 13 December 1999) is an Australian Paralympian who has competed in para-snowboard cross at three Winter Paralympics 2014 to 2022. His selection at the age of 14 at the 2014 Winter Paralympics meant that he became Australia's youngest Winter Paralympian, replacing Michael Milton. He was the youngest competitor at the 2014 Winter Paralympic Games from any country. He also competed at the 2018 Winter Paralympics and the 2022 Winter Paralympics, where he won the bronze medal in the Men's Snowboard Cross SB-LL2. At the 2026 Winter Paralympics, he won a silver and bronze medal and was Australia's only medallist.

== Personal ==
Tudhope was born with cerebral palsy due to a lack of oxygen to the brain during his birth and damage caused to the white matter in his brain, which caused hemiplegia on the left side of his body and damage connecting nerve tissue vital for movement. He lives in Manly, a suburb of Sydney, and attended the Sydney Church of England Grammar School. He has undertaken a Bachelor of Management – Sport Business at the University of Technology Sydney.

== Career ==
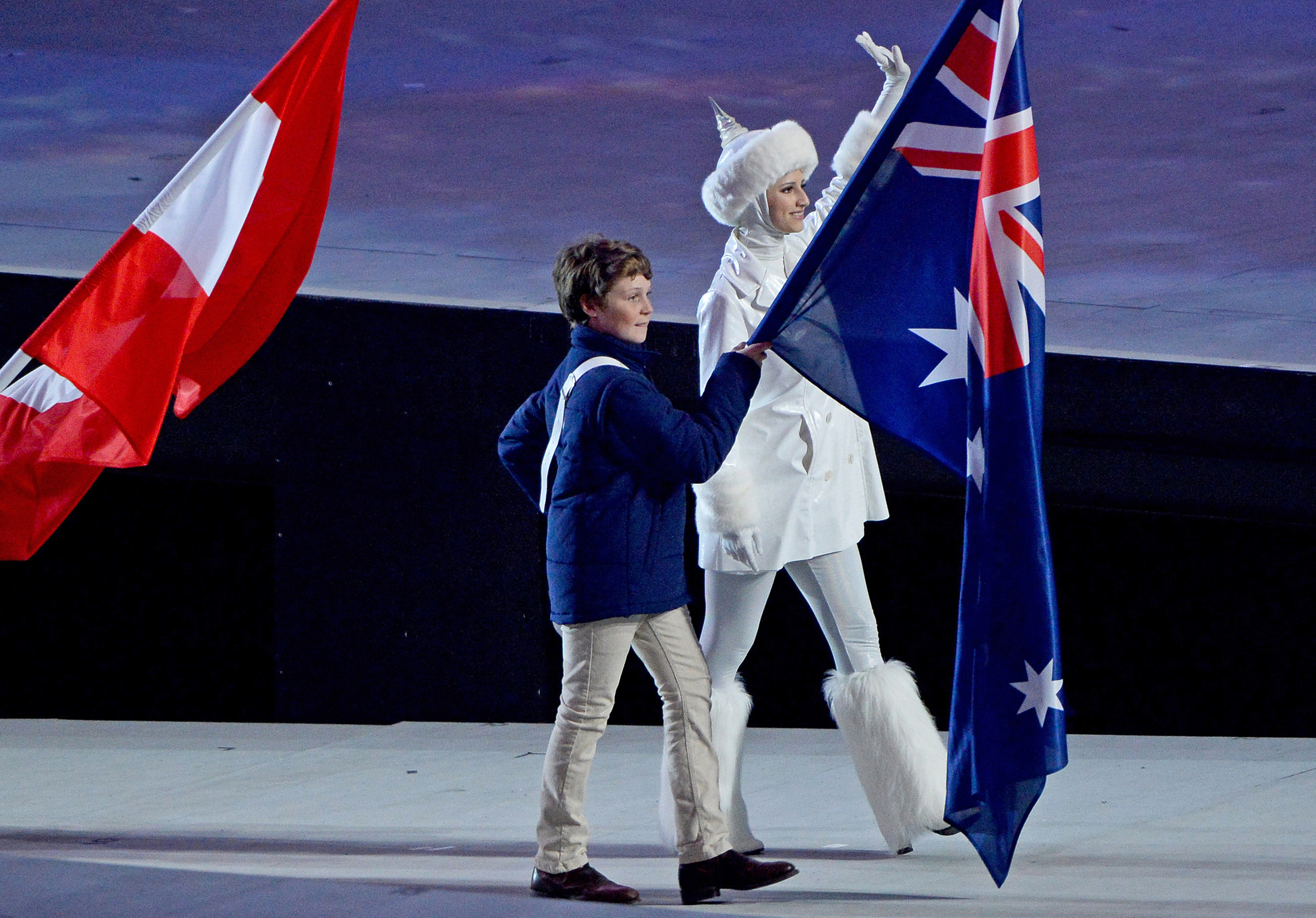
At 14, Tudhope carried the flag for Australia in the Closing Ceremony of the Sochi 2014 Winter Paralympics.

Tudhope's older sister Annabel introduced him to snowboarding in 2009. Annabel has competed on the World Snowboard Tour, and his other sister Phoebe has competed for Australia in mogul skiing.

His Winter Paralympics path began in 2011 when Peter Baff, the head coach of Perisher's Winter Sports Club alerted Peter Higgins, Australia's Paralympic snowboard team head coach, of his ability even though he was not tall. In 2014, Tudhope was 150 centimetres (4 ft 11 in) tall, and his French-made snowboard is 141 centimetres (56 in) long.

He competed in the 2013 European Cup to qualify for the 2014 Winter Paralympics. Due to his age, his mother Melissa has accompanied him to overseas competitions. He trains at Perisher Ski Resort, and undertakes dryland training at Monster Skatepark in the Sydney suburb of Homebush. In 2013, he was an Amelia McGuiness Australian Snowsports Development Foundation scholarship holder.

Tudhope's selection for the 2014 Winter Paralympics in Sochi at the age of 14 meant that he became Australia's youngest Winter Paralympian, replacing Mitchell Gourley.

He was the youngest competitor at the 2014 Winter Paralympic Games from any country. He finished 10th out of 33 competitors in the Men's Para-snowboard Cross, and was chosen to carry the Australian flag at the closing ceremony.

In 2017, Tudhope became part of the Sport Australia Hall of Fame Scholarship and Mentoring Program which included him being mentored by former Australian rugby union captain Nick Farr-Jones.

At the 2018 Winter Paralympics, Tudhope finished seventh in the banked slalom SB-LL2 and tenth in the snowboard cross SB-LL2.

At the 2019 World Para Snowboard Championships, Pyha, Finland, Tudhope won the silver medal in Men's Snowboard Cross LL2 and finished fourth in the Men's Banked Slalom LL2.

Tudhope won the silver medal in the men's snowboard cross SB-LL2 and the bronze medal in the men's dual banked slalom SB-LL2 event at the 2021 World Para Snow Sports Championships held in Lillehammer, Norway.

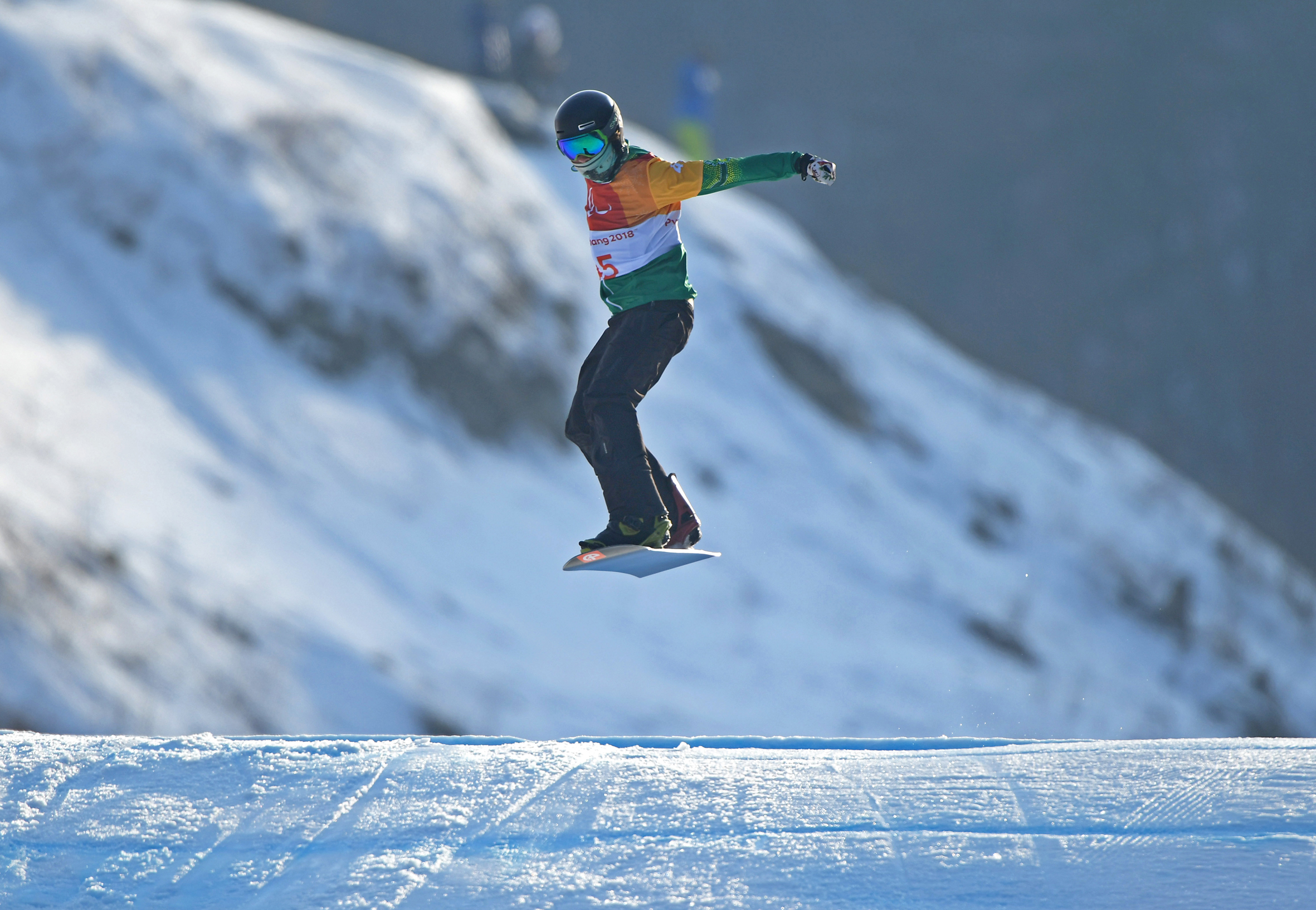
Tudhope in the banked snowboard event at the 2018 winter Paralympics

At the 2022 Winter Paralympics in Beijing, Tudhope won the bronze medal in the men's snowboard cross SB-LL2 and finished ninth in the men's snowboard banked slalom SB-LL2 event.

Tudehope won the gold medal in the Men's Snowboard Cross SB-LL2 and the bronze medal in the Men's Dual Banked Snowboard SB-LL2 at the 2023 World Para Snowboard Championships held at La Molina.

At the end of the 2023/2024 season, Tudhope was second on the overall banked slalom and cross standings. He was second on the Para Snowboard Overall World Cup standings.

At the 2025 World Para Snowboard Championships held at Big White, Canada, he won the bronze medal in the Men's Snowboard Cross SB-LL2 and finished fifth in the Men's Dual Banked Snowboard SB-LL2.

At the 2026 Winter Paralympics, he won two medals - silver in the Men's Snowboard Cross SB-LL2 and bronze in the Men's Snowboard Banked SB-LL2.

== Awards and recognition ==
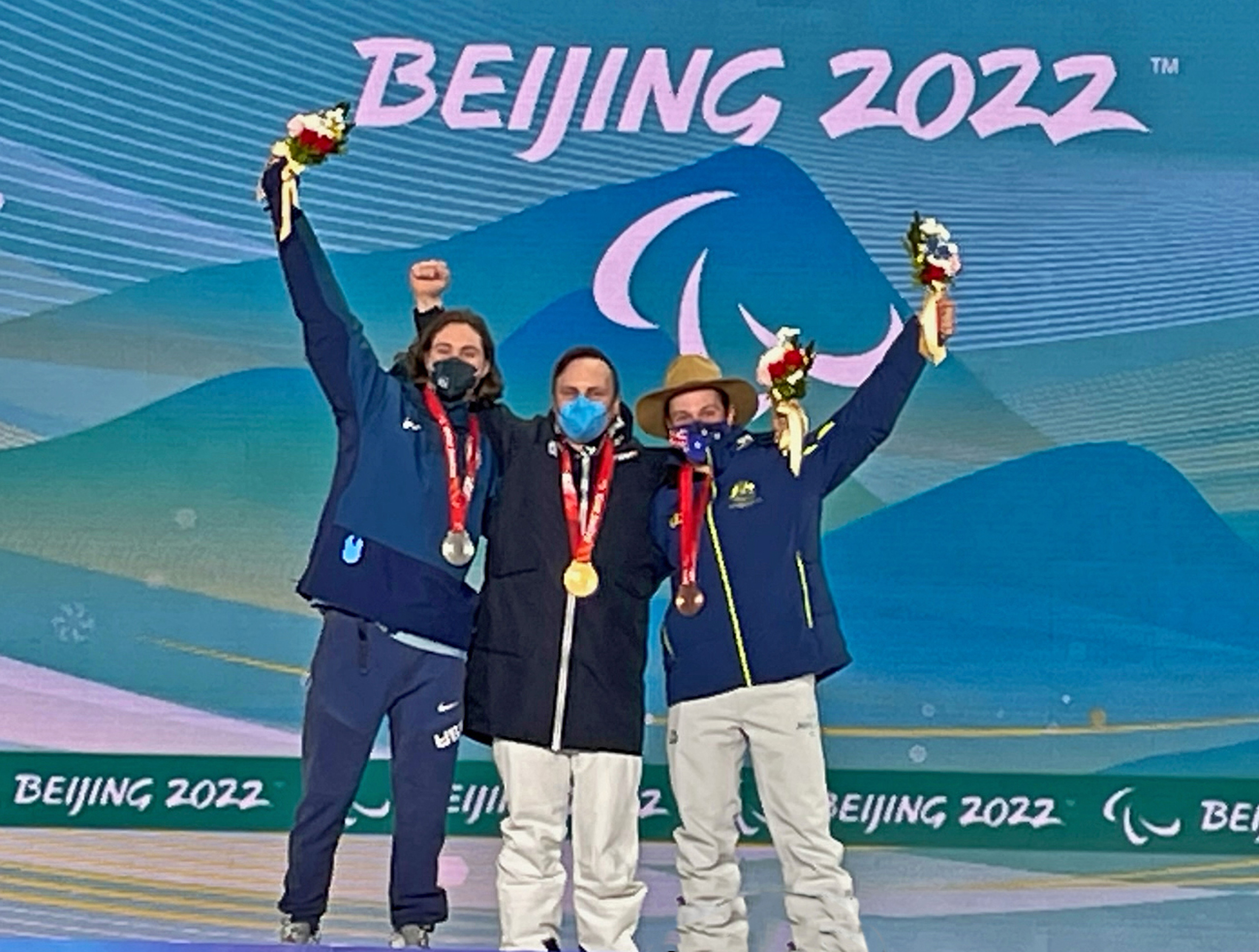
The medallists of the SB-LL2 snowboard cross event at the 2022 Beijing winter Paralympics. L-R: Garrett Geros (USA), silver; Matti Suur-Hamari (Finland), gold; and Ben Tudhope (Australia), bronze.

- 2014 – Flag bearer at the Closing Ceremony at the 2014 Winter Paralympics
- 2019 – Sport NSW Young Athlete of the Year with a Disability
- 2020 – Crystal Globe as the overall SB-LL2 Snowboard Cross 2019–20 season Champion and the Crystal Globe as the most successful Para Snowboard athlete across all disciplines
- 2020 – Snow Australia Paralympic Athlete of the Year
- 2021 – Snow Australia Paralympic Athlete of the Year
- 2022 – Crystal Globe as the overall SB-LL2 Snowboard Cross 2021–22 season Champion and the Crystal Globe as the most successful Para Snowboard athlete across all disciplines
- 2022 – Joint Team Captain with Melissa Perrine of Australian Team at 2022 Winter Paralympics
- 2022 – Flag bearer at Closing Ceremony at 2022 Winter Paralympics
- 2022 – Snow Australia Paralympic Athlete of the Year
- 2022 – Paralympics Australia - Australian Paralympian of the Year and Male Athlete of the Year
- 2022 – New South Wales Institute of Sport Male Athlete of the Year
- 2022 – Australian Institute of Sport Male Para-athlete of The Year
- 2023 – Snow Australia Paralympic Male Athlete of the Year
- 2024 – Snow Australia Paralympic Male Athlete of the Year
- 2026 – Flag bearer at Opening Ceremony with Georgia Gunew at 2026 Winter Paralympics
- 2026 - Snow Australia Paralympic Male Athlete of the Year
- 2026– Paralympics Australia - Australian Paralympian of the Year and Male Athlete of the Year
