= Geng Yanhong =

Chinese para-snowboarder

Personal information
- Nationality: Chinese

Sport
- Country: China
- Sport: Snowboarding
- Event(s): Snowboard cross Banked slalom
Medal record
Women's para snowboarding
Representing China
Winter Paralympics
Silver medal – second place	2022 Beijing	Banked slalom

Geng Yanhong is a Chinese snowboarder. She competed at the 2022 Winter Paralympics, winning a silver medal.

Geng won the silver medal in the women's banked slalom SB-LL2 event. She also competed in the women's snowboard cross SB-LL2 event.
