= Lee Je-hyuk =

South Korean para snowboarder (born 1997)

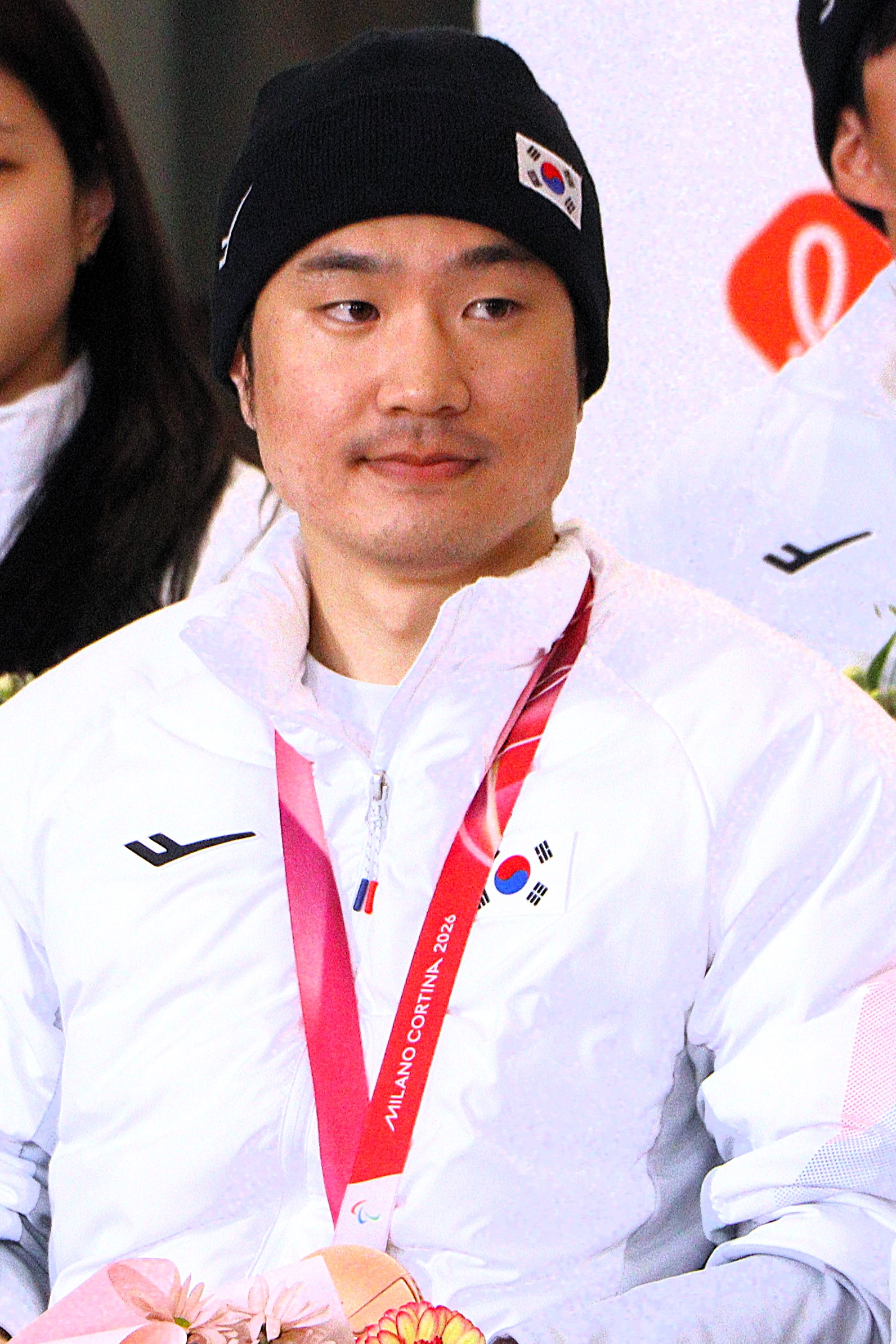

Personal information
- Born: 27 April 1997 (age 29) Seoul, South Korea

Sport
- Country: South Korea
- Sport: Para snowboard
- Disability class: SB-LL2
Medal record
Representing South Korea
Men's para snowboarding
Winter Paralympic Games
Bronze medal – third place	2026 Milano Cortina	Snowboard cross

Lee Je-hyuk (Korean: 이재혁; born 27 April 1997) is a South Korean para snowboarder. He represented South Korea at the 2022 and 2026 Winter Paralympics.

== Career ==
Lee won two gold medals at the 23rd National Winter Para Games for the fourth consecutive year. He then represented South Korea at the 2026 Winter Paralympics and won a bronze medal in the snowboard cross event.
