= Fabrice von Grünigen =

Swiss snowboarder (born 2001)

Personal information
- Nationality: Switzerland
- Born: 30 July 2001 (age 24) Saanen, Switzerland

Sport
- Country: Switzerland
- Sport: Snowboarding
- Events: Snowboard cross; banked slalom
Medal record
Men's para snowboarding
Representing Switzerland
Winter Paralympic Games
| Silver medal – second place | 2026 Milano Cortina | Banked slalom |

Fabrice von Grünigen (born 30 July 2001) is a Swiss para snowboarder.

== Early life ==
Von Grünigen was born in Saanen. He competed in amateur snowboarding and had to have his forefoot amputated and his lower leg reconstructed as a result of an accident he sustained on a high-altitude tour when he was 18. After getting back on his board, national coach Silvan Hofer became aware of von Grünigen through the efforts of a neighbor.

== Career ==
Von Grünigen made his competitive debut in the 2023–24 season, where he won the overall European Cup. The following season, he competed in the World Cup, where he won a bronze medal and two silver medals, leading to his World Para Snowboard Championships debut in 2025. During the 2025–26 FIS Para Snowboard World Cup he won at least one round in the snowboard cross.

At the 2026 Winter Paralympics, von Grünigen crashed during training for the snowboard cross competition, leading him to withdraw from that event. He then competed in the banked slalom event and won the silver medal there.
