= Kate Delson =

American Paralympic snowboarder (born 2005)

Personal information
- Born: May 5, 2005 (age 21)
- Home town: San Diego, California, U.S.

Sport
- Country: United States
- Sport: Snowboarding
- Disability class: SB-LL2
Medal record
Women's para snowboarding
Representing the United States
Winter Paralympic Games
Gold medal – first place	2026 Milano Cortina	Banked slalom SB-LL2
Silver medal – second place	2026 Milano Cortina	Snowboard cross SB-LL2
World Championships
Silver medal – second place	2025 Big White	Snowboard cross

Kate Delson (born May 5, 2005) is an American para-snowboarder. She represented the United States at the 2026 Winter Paralympics.

== Career ==
Delson competed at the 2025 World Para Snowboard Championships and won a silver medal in the snowboard cross event.

During the 2025–26 FIS Para Snowboard World Cup, she won the overall crystal globe. In February 2026, she was selected to represent the United States at the 2026 Winter Paralympics. She won a gold medal in the banked slalom event with a time of 1:02.99. She also won a silver medal in the snowboard cross event.

== Personal life ==
Delson was born with a congenital disability that left her missing most of the muscles in her right leg, including her calf.
