= Wang Xinyu (snowboarder) =

Chinese Paralympic snowboarder (born 2001)

Personal information
- Born: 19 August 2001 (age 25)

Sport
- Country: China
- Sport: Para snowboard
- Disability class: SB-LL2
Medal record
Women's para snowboarding
Representing China
Winter Paralympic Games
| Bronze medal – third place | 2026 Milano Cortina | Snowboard cross SB-LL2 |

Wang Xinyu (born 19 August 2001) is a Chinese para-snowboarder. She represented China at the 2026 Winter Paralympics.

== Career ==
In February 2026, Wang was selected to represent China at the 2026 Winter Paralympics. She competed in the snowboard cross event and won a bronze medal.
