= Aron Fahrni =

Swiss para snowboarder (born 1998)

Personal information
- Born: 22 August 1998 (age 28)

Sport
- Country: Switzerland
- Sport: Para snowboard
- Disability class: SB-UL
Medal record
Representing Switzerland
Men's para snowboarding
Winter Paralympic Games
Bronze medal – third place	2026 Milano Cortina	Snowboard cross

Aron Fahrni (born 22 August 1998) is a Swiss para snowboarder. He represented Switzerland at the 2026 Winter Paralympics.

== Career ==
Fahrni won the 2024–25 FIS Para Snowboard World Cup banked slalom crystal globe. During the 2025–26 FIS Para Snowboard World Cup he won the banked slalom, snowboard cross and overall crystal globes.

Fahrni represented Switzerland at the 2026 Winter Paralympics and won a bronze medal in the snowboard cross SB-UL event.
