= Big White Ski Resort =

Ski resort in British Columbia, Canada

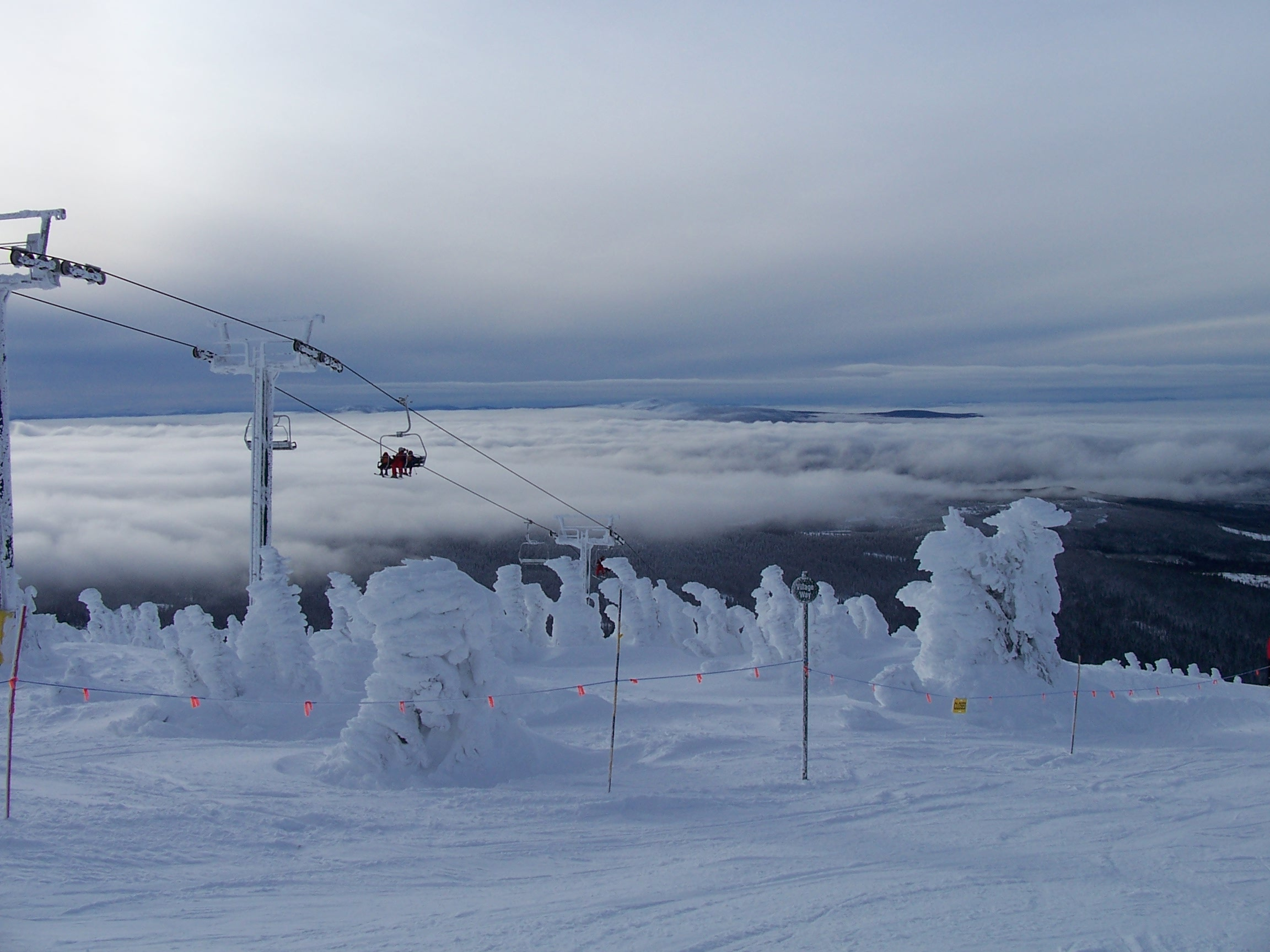
- The Gem Lake Express lift at Big White
- Interactive map of Big White Ski Resort
- Location: Kootenay Boundary, British Columbia, Canada
- Nearest city: Kelowna (56 km)
- Coordinates: 49°43′19″N 118°55′44″W
- Top elevation: 2,319 m (7,608 ft)
- Base elevation: 1,508 m (4,948 ft)
- Skiable area: 1,119 ha (2,765 acres)
- Trails: 119 Designated Trails; 18% Beginner; 54% Intermediate; 22% Expert; 6% Extreme
- Longest run: 7.2 km (4.5 mi)
- Lift system: 16 total (1 gondola, 5 high-speed chairs, 5 chairs, 3 ground/t-bar, 2 tubing)
- Lift capacity: 28,000 skiers/hr
- Snowfall: 750 cm (300 in)
- Snowmaking: Planned
- Night skiing: 0.15 km^{2} (0.058 sq mi)
- Website: Official website

Big White Ski Resort, simply known as Big White, is a ski resort located 56 km (35 mi) southeast of Kelowna in the Southern Interior of British Columbia. It is located on Big White Mountain, the highest summit in the Okanagan Highland, an upland area between the Monashee Mountains and the Okanagan Valley. Big White is the fourth largest resort in British Columbia, after Whistler-Blackcomb, Sun Peaks, and Silver Star.

The mountain summit is 2,319 m (7,608 ft) tall with a vertical drop of 777 m (2,549 ft), serviced by 16 lifts. The mountain receives 750 cm (300 in) of annual snowfall. It has 1,147 ha (2,834 acres) of overall skiable terrain. With 15 ha (38 acres) of night skiing, Big White has western Canada's largest resort night skiing area. It has a central village classified as a designated place by Statistics Canada, which contains a significant retail area as well as multiple accommodations. The village is 1,755 m (5,758 ft) above sea level.

== History ==
Big White was founded by Cliff Serwa and Doug Mervin and opened in 1963 with one T-bar. The first Snow Ghosts were discovered in 1965 by skiers, they later became the mountain's icon. The first accommodation on the mountain was built in 1968 and the first cabin was built in 1969. In 1976 a day lodge was constructed at the top of the village on porcupine road which served the mountain until 2000 when the Happy Valley Day Lodge opened. it was demolished to make way for housing developments. The first building to be constructed in what is the village center today was Whitefoot Lodge, built in 1980 and housed the ski rental shop and ticket booths until the Village Centre Mall opened in 1997. It was later turned into the village daycare.

The Ridge Chair (double) opened in 1971. The Powder Chair (1979) (triple), The Easter Chair (1976) (triple), and the Village Chair (triple) opened thereafter. In the mid-1980s the Easter Chair was moved to replace the Bunny Hill T-bar and was renamed the Village Chair; the Village Chair became the Summit Chair. In 1986, Big White's first quad chair was built. The plaza chair which takes skiers from the base of the Ridge, to the Village Centre. The Ridge Rocket Express (quad) replaced the double chair in 1989 and the Bullet Express replaced the Summit and Village chairs in 1991. The Alpine T-Bar was moved to its present location and extended around this time as well. The Falcon Chair, which was in fact the old Ridge Chair, opened up on the west side of the hill in 1992. Black Forest opened in 1994 adding more runs to the east side of the mountain with an express quad chairlift. The Gem Lake Express (quad), which doubled the skiable era, opened in 1996. In 2000 the Happy Valley Gondola was built to take people from the new lower village up to the village centre. The six-pack Snow Ghost was built adjacent to Ridge Rocket in 2006 to provide additional uphill capacity out of the Ridge base area. The Cliff Chair (in the North-East section of the mountain) closed during the 2008 season whilst it waited for inspections by avalanche experts after the Parachute Bowl slipped in January 2008. In 2018 the triple-seat Powder Chair was replaced by a four-seat chair with the same name.

In April 2020 The Snowghost Inn had a major roof collapse causing the roof over the atrium and pool to collapse. Big White was closed at the time due to the COVID-19 pandemic.

On Saturday, January 27th, 2024, Big White encountered an operational disruption when the Black Forest high-speed chairlift necessitated evacuation due to a seized bearing in its electric motor.

Shred and Revenge of the Boarding School Dropouts (Shred 2) snowboarding movies starring Tom Green and Dave England were filmed at Silver Star and Big White.

== Skiing terrain ==
Big White has a total of 119 designated trails and 27 unnamed trails. 18% of these trails are beginner, 56% intermediate, 22% advanced, and 6% of the runs fall into the extreme category. Widely varied terrain exists in the wooded areas between runs, most of which are sanctioned.

Big White currently has one 8-passenger high-speed gondola, one 6-passenger high-speed chair (new for the 06/07 season), four 4-passenger high-speed chairs, two 4-passenger fixed-grip chairs, three 2-passenger chairs (including the Telus park chairlift), one T-bar, one children's and one adult's magic carpet. There is a tubing carpet lift (new for the 2015–2016 season). These lifts are capable of transporting 28,000 people per hour uphill. All feeder lifts now use radio-frequency identification (RFID) gate technology to scan guests for valid lift tickets and passes.

=== Eastside ===
The eastern side of Big White is where the majority of lifts are located. The runs on this side are usually shorter and more crowded than those found over on the Gem Lakeside. The most advanced runs are located on this side underneath the Cliff Chair.

There is one high-speed detachable 6-seater chair (Snow Ghost Express), three high-speed detachable quad chairs (Ridge Rocket, Bullet, and the Black Forest), one fixed-grip quad chairlift (Powder Chair), three double chairlifts (Falcon, Cliff, and Telus Park), and a single T-bar, the Alpine T-bar.

The Ridge Rocket chair has a small lodge at its base, and the base of the Bullet chair is very near the main village. The new 6-seater lift (the Snow Ghost Express) was built for the 2006–2007 season parallel to Ridge Rocket Express to reduce lift lines.

=== Gem Lake ===
Gem Lake is located on the western side of Big White and is served by the Gem Lake high-speed detachable quad chair. The Falcon and Powder Chairs, two and four-person lifts respectively, are nearby. The Gem Lake lift is often windier than the east side lifts but offers the largest single-lift vertical drop at the hill at 710 m (2,330 ft). It has a lodge known as the Westridge Warming Hut complete with washrooms, coffee shops, ticket sales, and large parking lot at its base; the base of the Gem Lake Express is quite distant from the Village area. The addition of several new groomed blue and green runs at Gem Lake has allowed this area to be much more friendly to the intermediate skier or rider.

=== East Peak ===
The ski resort is expected to unveil plans in the near future that call for the addition of 810 ha (2,000 acres) of skiable area on the East Peak. This new area will be mainly intermediate and advanced terrain and the expansion will be on land leased from the province.

Also included in the plans are a second base area, a new residential area, and a golf course.

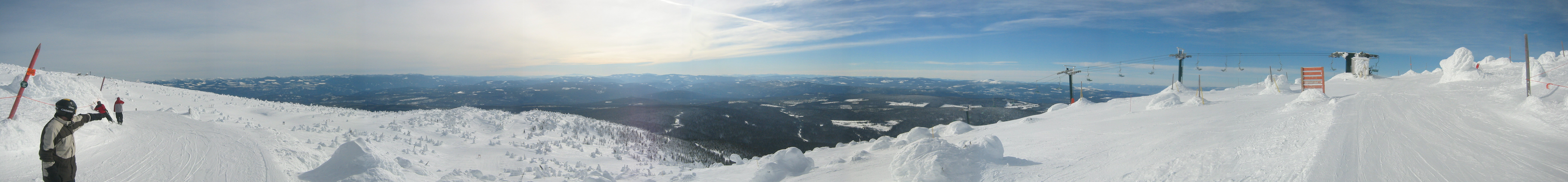
Panorama from near the top of the Falcon Chair

=== Terrain Park ===
Big White opened the Telus Park in the 2004/2005 season. It features a standard sized half-pipe along with a skier/border cross course and beginner through to advanced rails and jumps. The park is separated into two sides; one has larger jumps, rails, and boxes, and the other has smaller features, the border cross, and a half-pipe. Big White is also exclusive to a snow-cross run identical to the one at the Olympics.

=== Nordic trails ===
Big White has 25 km (16 mi) of Nordic trails.

=== Ski and Snowboard School ===
Big White has over 200 qualified instructors, offering classes for all ages and all skill levels.

== Master Plan ==
As of 2023, the Big White Master Plan proposes more than a dozen additional lifts, again doubling the skiable terrain.

== Services ==
=== Activities ===
Activities include: the Mega Snow Coaster (Once the largest tubing park in North America), snowmobile tours, Kids snowmobile rides, sleigh riding, dog sleds, snowshoeing through Big White's trails, and ice skating on the Olympic-sized outdoor rink. Big White also has an 18 m (60 ft) ice climbing wall, catered to all ages and climbing levels. There is the Sno-Limo, which is mean to be a cross between a dog sled and a lazy-boy chair on skis.

A new summer hiking trail opened at Big White on July 19, 2014.

Big White also has Snow Adventure ski and snowboard improvement courses hosted by Snow Adventure in collaboration with the Big White Ski and Board School. There are various courses available including learn-to-ride courses, off-piste specific courses, a 3-week master-the-mountain course as well as ladies' and men's improvement weeks.

=== Accommodations ===
There are currently four village condo hotels, 25 condo or townhouse complexes, 244 vacation homes, and one ski-in/ski-out hostel.

Vacation property rental companies manage many of the properties in Big White.

The village area includes 18 restaurants, cafés and delicatessens, as well as a small grocery store and liquor store.

=== Retail ===
Big White is located about a one-hour drive outside Kelowna and features a quaint on-mountain village. Several shops such as Dizzy's Ski Shop, The Village Rider, Ski Dazzle, and the New Loose Moose Emporium Candy Shop are located in the Village Centre Mall and around the village. The Mountain Mart is a fully stocked grocery store and a licensed liquor outlet as well, located in the Village. There's also a wine and beer store located in the Village Centre Mall.

== Deaths ==
On January 6, 2008, Leigh Barnier, an Australian skier, was killed by an avalanche while skiing on an open, in-bounds run. Barnier was an employee at the time; however, he was not on shift.

On March 6, 2010, a snowboarder from Vancouver, British Columbia, was killed after striking an obstacle near the Falcon Chair. A doctor, who was skiing close by, attended to the injured man almost immediately, but the man was already deceased.

On March 13, 2011, an Ontario man was spotted upside-down in a tree well on one of the runs. The man was airlifted to Kelowna General Hospital where he was pronounced dead.

On January 8, 2013, Nickolas Voyer-Taylor, a snowboarder from Winnipeg, Manitoba, died of hypothermia after being retrieved from a creek bed near Sapphire Glades at the Big White Resort. He was found seriously injured, partially submerged in water, and buried in snow.

On December 20, 2017, a 60-year-old skier died after skiing over a 7.6–9.1 m (25–30 ft) cliff that was in an out-of-bounds area and landing buried in the snow. Attempts were made by emergency personnel and the ski patrol to resuscitate the male skier but were unsuccessful.

On January 2, 2021, an unfortunate accident led to the death of a 57-year-old nurse from Kelowna, Carrie Koski. The police were alerted by a 911 call at 4:17 pm that a woman had been found dead. She was found in a tree well by searchers and efforts were made to revive her.

On December 26, 2021, a 42-year-old Kelowna man, Ryan Fletcher, died in the Gem Lake area. He was reported missing on December 26th after he did not return from his last run. He was found and recovered the following day in an area outside of the resort boundaries.

On July 4, 2023, a teenager died following a mountain biking crash at the BC Cup that took place at Big White Ski Resort over the Canada Day long weekend. Despite wearing a helmet during the race, it's believed the competitor crashed and hit their head. They died at the scene.

On February 25, 2026, a 71-year-old male died on the slopes. He was pronounced dead by a doctor after being transported to the ski patrol hut.

== Gallery ==
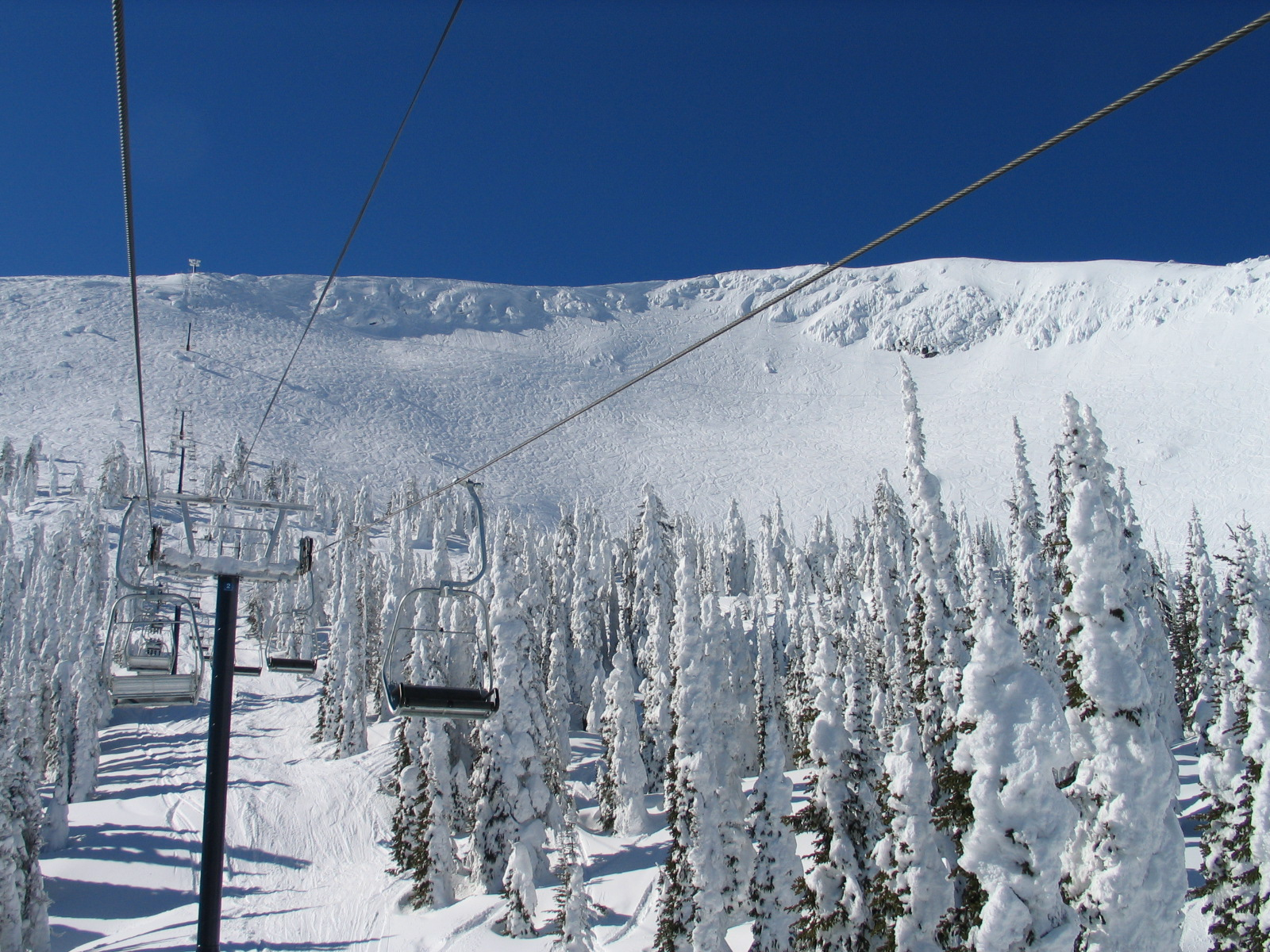
Looking up from the bottom of the Cliff Chair

Trappers Crossing, a town house complex

The Village Centre Mall

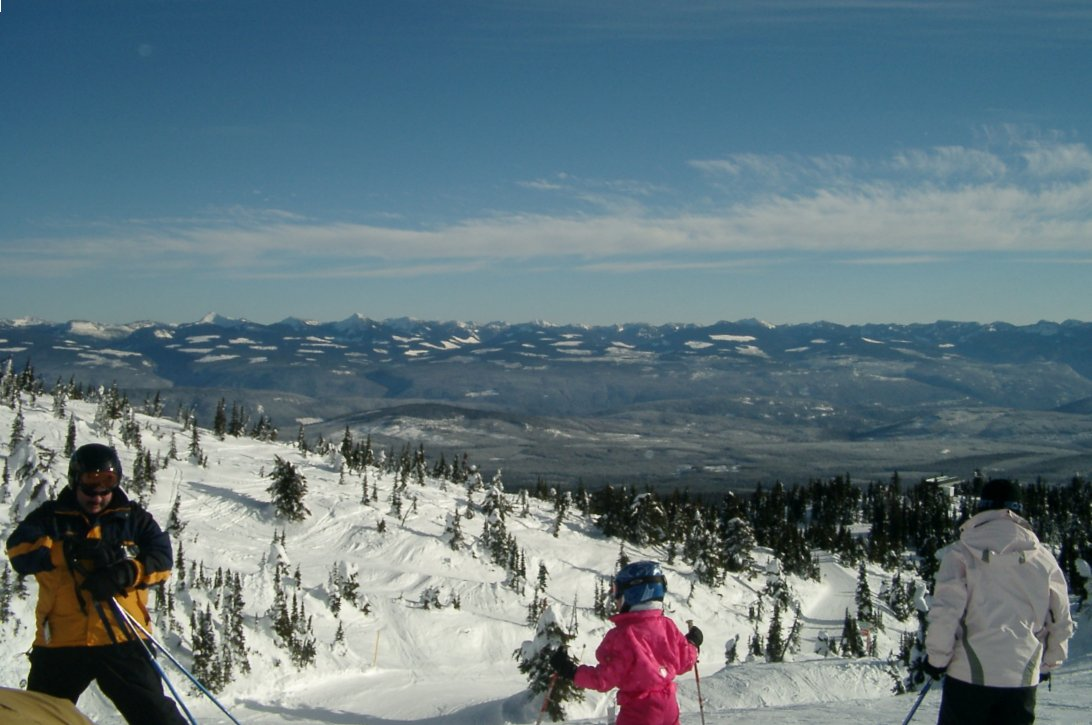
Near top of the Powder Chair

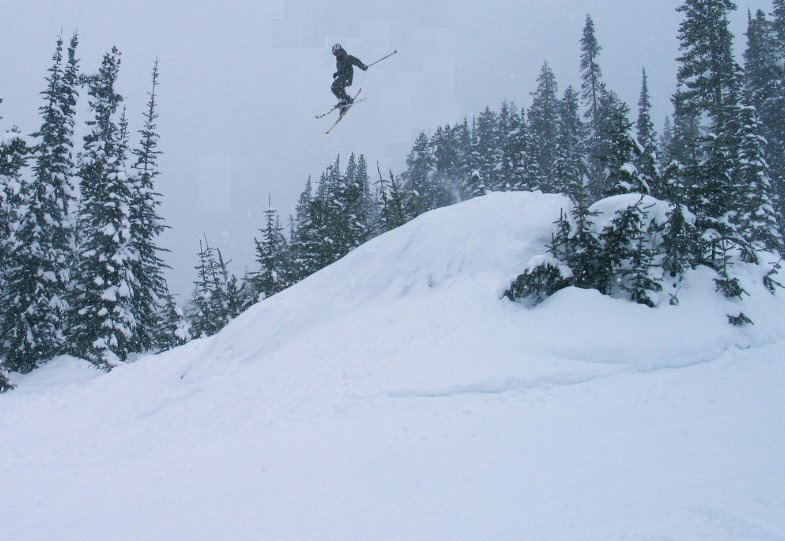
Jumping off a boulder

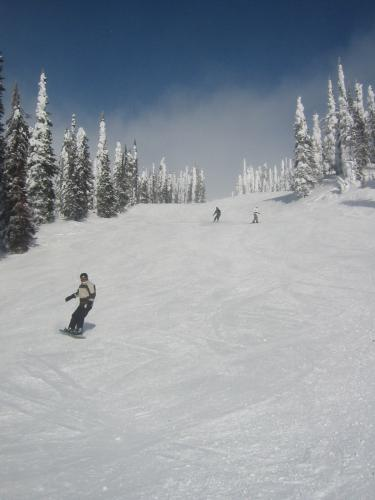
Boarders coming down the Powder Chute

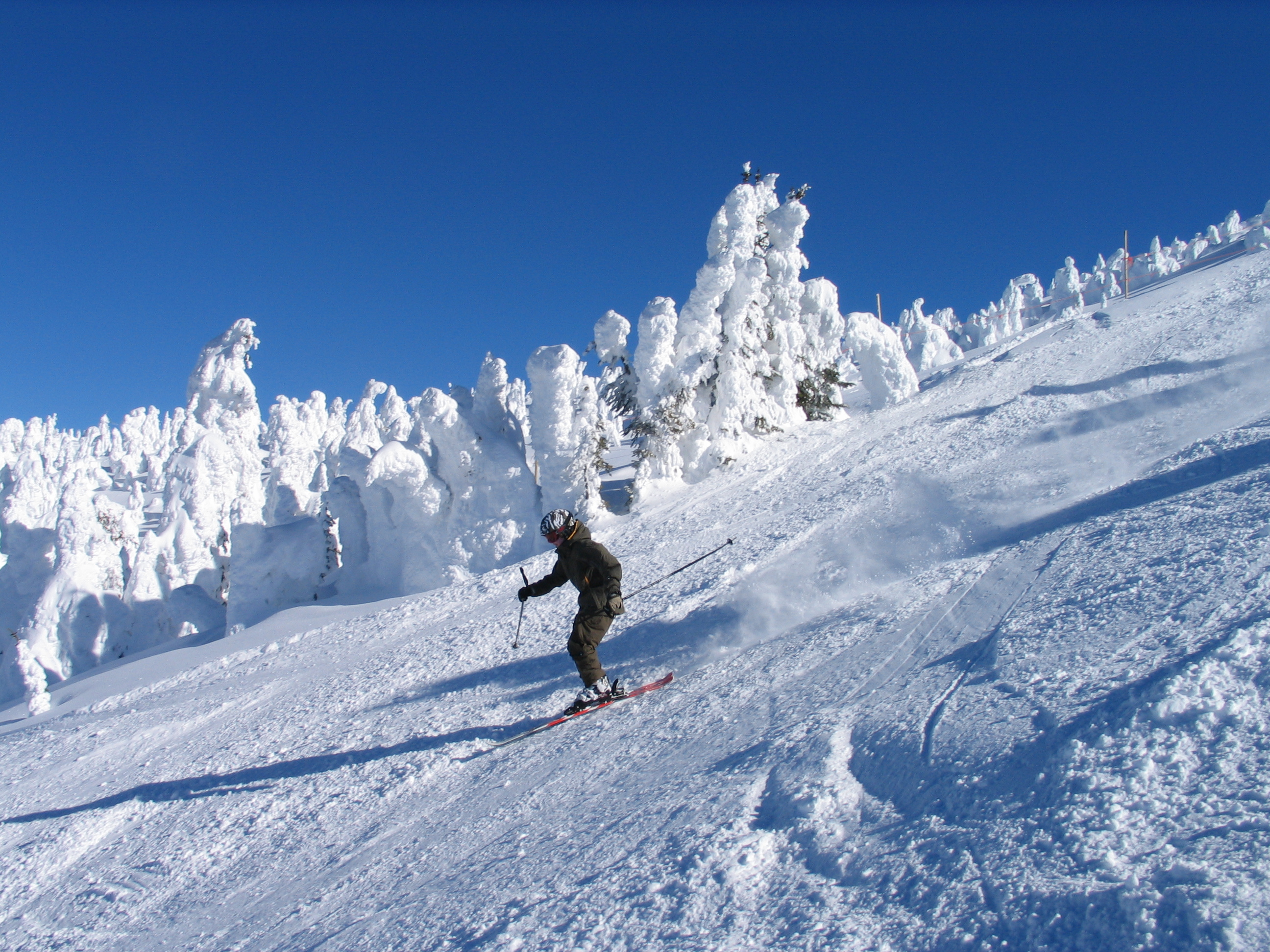
Skiing a black diamond at Big White
