= China at the 2022 Winter Paralympics =

- Flag of China
- IPC code: CHN
- NPC: China Administration of Sports for Persons with Disabilities
- Website: www.caspd.org.cn

in Beijing, China 4 March 2022 – 13 March 2022
- Competitors: 96 (68 on foot, 28 on wheelchair) in 6 sports
- Flag bearers (opening): Guo Yujie; Wang Zhidong
- Flag bearer (closing): Yang Hongqiong
- Medals Ranked 1st: Gold 18 Silver 20 Bronze 23 Total 61

Winter Paralympics appearances (overview)
- 2002; 2006; 2010; 2014; 2018; 2022; 2026

China competed as the host nation of the 2022 Winter Paralympics in Beijing, China that took place between 4–13 March 2022. In total, 96 athletes were initially expected to compete. The total competition places that the Chinese delegation achieved is 116. It is the largest delegation to compete at the Games.

China topped the medal table for the first time, becoming the first Asian country to top the medal count with more gold medals, more silver medals, more bronze medals, and more medals overall than any other nation. China also broke the record for the most gold medals, the most silvers medals, the most bronze medals and the most medal overall won by Asian countries at a single Winter Paralympics.

== Medalists ==
The following Chinese competitors won medals at the games. In the discipline sections below, the medalists' names are bolded.

Medal	Name	Sport	Event	Date
Gold	Yang Hongqiong	Cross-country skiing	Women's 10 kilometre, sitting	12 March
Gold	Mao Zhongwu	Cross-country skiing	Men's 12.5 kilometre, sitting	12 March
Gold	Wang Chenyang	Cross-country skiing	Men's 12.5 kilometre, standing	12 March
Gold	Wang Haitao; Chen Jianxin; Zhang Mingliang; Yan Zhou; Sun Yulong	Wheelchair curling	Mixed tournament	12 March
Gold	Qi Sun	Snowboarding	Men's banked slalom, SB-LL2	11 March
Gold	Wu Zhongwei	Snowboarding	Men's banked slalom, SB-LL1	11 March
Gold	Zhang Mengqiu	Alpine skiing	Women's giant slalom, standing	11 March
Gold	Liu Mengtao	Biathlon	Men's 12.5 kilometres, sitting	11 March
Gold	Yang Hongqiong	Cross-country skiing	Women's sprint, sitting	9 March
Gold	Zheng Peng	Cross-country skiing	Men's sprint, sitting	9 March
Gold	Liu Mengtao	Biathlon	Men's 10 kilometres, sitting	8 March
Gold	Ji Lijia	Snowboarding	Men's snowboard cross, SB-UL	7 March
Gold	Yang Hongqiong	Cross-country skiing	Women's long distance, sitting	6 March
Gold	Zheng Peng	Cross-country skiing	Men's long distance, sitting	6 March
Gold	Liang Jingyi	Alpine skiing	Men's Super-G, standing	6 March
Gold	Zhang Mengqiu	Alpine skiing	Women's Super-G, standing	6 March
Gold	Guo Yujie	Biathlon	Women's sprint, standing	5 March
Gold	Liu Zixu	Biathlon	Men's sprint, sitting	5 March
Silver	Liang Jingyi	Alpine skiing	Men's slalom, standing	13 March
Silver	Shan Yilin; Wang Chenyang; Zheng Peng; Cai Jiayun	Cross-country skiing	Mixed 4 × 2.5 kilometre relay	13 March
Silver	Wang Yue; Guide: Yalin Li	Cross-country skiing	Women's 10 kilometre, visually impaired	12 March
Silver	Zheng Peng	Cross-country skiing	Men's 12.5 kilometre, sitting	12 March
Silver	Zhang Mengqiu	Alpine skiing	Women's slalom, standing	12 March
Silver	Zhang Wenjing	Alpine skiing	Women's slalom, sitting	12 March
Silver	Geng Yanhong	Snowboarding	Women's banked slalom, SB-LL2	11 March
Silver	Ji Lijia	Snowboarding	Men's banked slalom, SB-UL	11 March
Silver	Zhu Daqing; Guide: Yan Hanhan	Alpine skiing	Women's giant slalom, visually impaired	11 March
Silver	Zhao Zhiqing	Biathlon	Women's 12.5 kilometres, standing	11 March
Silver	Liu Sitong	Alpine skiing	Women's giant slalom, sitting	11 March
Silver	Mao Zhongwu	Cross-country skiing	Men's sprint, sitting	9 March
Silver	Wang Pengyao	Snowboarding	Men's snowboard cross, SB-UL	7 March
Silver	Cai Jiayun	Cross-country skiing	Men's long distance classical, standing	7 March
Silver	Zhang Mengqiu	Alpine skiing	Women's super combined, standing	7 March
Silver	Zhu Daqing; Guide: Yan Hanhan	Alpine skiing	Women's super combined, visually impaired	7 March
Silver	Mao Zhongwu	Cross-country skiing	Men's long distance, sitting	6 March
Silver	Shan Yilin	Biathlon	Women's sprint, sitting	5 March
Silver	Zhu Daqing; Guide: Yan Hanhan	Alpine skiing	Women's downhill, vision impaired	5 March
Silver	Zhang Mengqiu	Alpine skiing	Women's downhill, standing	5 March
Bronze	China national para ice hockey team: Bai Xuesong; Cui Yutao; Hu Guangjian; Ji Yanzhao; Li Hongguan; Lyu Zhi; Shen Yifeng; Song Xiaodong; Tian Jintao; Wang Jujiang; Wang Wei; Wang Zhidong; Xu Jinqiang; Yu Jing; Zhang Zheng; Zhu Zhanfu	Para ice hockey	Open tournament	12 March
Bronze	Ma Jing	Cross-country skiing	Women's 10 kilometre, sitting	12 March
Bronze	Cai Jiayun	Cross-country skiing	Men's 12.5 kilometre, standing	12 March
Bronze	Liu Sitong	Alpine skiing	Women's slalom, sitting	12 March
Bronze	Yu Shuang; Guide: Wang Guanyu	Biathlon	Men's 12.5 kilometres, visually impaired	11 March
Bronze	Li Tiantian	Snowboarding	Women's banked slalom, SB-LL2	11 March
Bronze	Zhu Yonggang	Snowboarding	Men's banked slalom, SB-UL	11 March
Bronze	Zhang Wenjing	Alpine skiing	Women's giant slalom, sitting	11 March
Bronze	Shan Yilin	Biathlon	Women's 12.5 kilometres, sitting	11 March
Bronze	Liu Zixu	Biathlon	Men's 12.5 kilometres, sitting	11 March
Bronze	Liang Zilu	Alpine skiing	Men's giant slalom, sitting	10 March
Bronze	Li Panpan	Cross-country skiing	Women's sprint, sitting	9 March
Bronze	Wang Yue; Guide: Yalin Li	Biathlon	Women's 10 kilometres, visually impaired	8 March
Bronze	Wu Zhongwei	Snowboarding	Men's snowboard cross, SB-LL1	7 March
Bronze	Zhu Yonggang	Snowboarding	Men's snowboard cross, SB-UL	7 March
Bronze	Qui Mingyang	Cross-country skiing	Men's long distance classical, standing	7 March
Bronze	Liu Sitong	Alpine skiing	Women's super combined, sitting	7 March
Bronze	Li Panpan	Cross-country skiing	Women's long distance, sitting	6 March
Bronze	Zhu Daqing; Guide: Yan Hanhan	Alpine skiing	Women's Super-G, visually impaired	6 March
Bronze	Zhang Wenjing	Alpine skiing	Women's Super-G, sitting	6 March
Bronze	Zhao Zhiqing	Biathlon	Women's sprint, standing	5 March
Bronze	Liu Mengtao	Biathlon	Men's sprint, sitting	5 March
Bronze	Liu Sitong	Alpine skiing	Women's downhill, sitting	5 March

**Medals by sport**
**Sport**	1st place, gold medalist(s)	2nd place, silver medalist(s)	3rd place, bronze medalist(s)	Total
Cross-country skiing	7	6	5	18
Biathlon	4	2	6	12
Alpine skiing	3	9	7	19
Snowboarding	3	3	4	10
Wheelchair curling	1	0	0	1
Para ice hockey	0	0	1	1
**Total**	**18**	**20**	**23**	**61**

Medals by date
**Day**	**Date**	1st place, gold medalist(s)	2nd place, silver medalist(s)	3rd place, bronze medalist(s)	Total
Day 1	5 March	2	3	3	8
Day 2	6 March	4	1	3	8
Day 3	7 March	1	4	4	9
Day 4	8 March	1	0	1	2
Day 5	9 March	2	1	1	4
Day 6	10 March	0	0	1	1
Day 7	11 March	4	5	6	15
Day 8	12 March	4	4	4	12
Day 9	13 March	0	2	0	2
Total		18	20	23	61

**Medals by gender**
**Gender**	1st place, gold medalist(s)	2nd place, silver medalist(s)	3rd place, bronze medalist(s)	**Total**
Male	11	7	8	**26**
Female	6	12	14	**32**
Mixed	1	1	1	**3**
**Total**	**18**	**20**	**23**	**61**

Multiple medalists
**Name**	**Sport**	1st place, gold medalist(s)	2nd place, silver medalist(s)	3rd place, bronze medalist(s)	Total
Zhang Mengqiu	Alpine skiing	2	3	0	5
Zhu Daqing	Alpine skiing	0	3	1	4
Liu Sitong	Alpine skiing	0	1	3	4
Yang Hongqiong	Cross-country skiing	3	0	0	3
Liu Mengtao	Biathlon	2	1	0	3
Zheng Peng	Cross-country skiing	2	1	0	3
Mao Zhongwu	Cross-country skiing	1	2	0	3
Zhang Wenjing	Alpine skiing	0	1	2	3
Ji Lijia	Snowboarding	1	1	0	2
Liang Jingyi	Alpine skiing	1	1	0	2
Liu Zixu	Biathlon	1	0	1	2
Wu Zhongwei	Snowboarding	1	0	1	2
Shan Yilin	Biathlon	0	1	1	2
Zhao Zhiqing	Biathlon	0	1	1	2
Cai Jiayun	Cross-country skiing	0	1	1	2
Wang Yue	Biathlon	0	1	1	2
Li Panpan	Cross-country skiing	0	0	2	2
Zhu Yonggang	Snowboarding	0	0	2	2

== Administration ==
The delegation consists of 96 athletes and 121 staff members. Biathlete and para cross-country skier Guo Yujie and para ice hockey player Wang Zhidong were the flagbearers for China during the opening ceremony.

== Competitors ==
The following is the list of number of competitors participating at the Games per sport/discipline.

Sport	Men	Women	Total
Alpine skiing	14	8	22
Biathlon	11	10	21
Cross-country skiing	18	14	32
Para ice hockey	17	1	18
Snowboarding	14	4	18
Wheelchair curling	4	1	5
Total	78	38	116

== Alpine skiing ==
China competed in alpine skiing.

Men

Athlete	Event	Run 1		Run 2		Total	
Athlete	Event	Time	Rank	Time	Rank	Time	Rank
Li Biao	Downhill, standing	—N/a				1:23.07	24
Liang Jingyi	Downhill, standing	—N/a				1:16.36	4
Niu Shaojie	Downhill, standing	—N/a				1:23.48	27
Sun Hongsheng	Downhill, standing	—N/a				1:28.00	30
Sun Yanlong	Downhill, standing	—N/a				1:23.12	25
Chen Liang	Downhill, sitting	—N/a				1:33.08	14
Gong Zhaolin	Downhill, sitting	—N/a				DNF	
Li Xiang	Downhill, sitting	—N/a				1:28.86	13
Liang Zilu	Downhill, sitting	—N/a				1:23.99	10
Yan Hailing	Downhill, sitting	—N/a				1:23.74	9
Chen Xinjun	Giant slalom, standing	1:07.17	27	1:04.70	25	2:11.87	25
Li Biao	Giant slalom, standing	DNF					
Liang Jingyi	Giant slalom, standing	58.87	5	59.60	12	1:58.47	8
Niu Shaojie	Giant slalom, standing	1:05.29	22	DNF			
Sun Yanlong	Giant slalom, standing	1:03.69	16	1:02.91	21	2:06.60	19
Chen Liang	Giant slalom, sitting	1:03.56	6	1:02.38	9	2:05.94	6
Gong Zhaolin	Giant slalom, sitting	1:06.42	13	1:07.53	23	2:13.95	19
Li Xiang	Giant slalom, sitting	1:07.11	18	1:05.87	20	2:12.98	18
Liang Zilu	Giant slalom, sitting	1:01.55	4	59.37	3	2:00.92	3rd place, bronze medalist(s)
Wang Hui	Giant slalom, sitting	1:12.24	29	1:11.17	28	2:23.41	28
Chen Xinjun	Slalom, standing	DNF					
Liang Jingyi	Slalom, standing	43.26	3	49.01	1	1:32.27	2nd place, silver medalist(s)
Sun Yanlong	Slalom, standing	48.88	20	55.67	11	1:44.55	10
Yan Gong	Slalom, standing	49.78	22	55.40	10	1:45.18	13
Zhen Qixing	Slalom, standing	DNF					
Chen Liang	Slalom, sitting	45.89	6	1:10.38	14	1:56.27	13
Li Xiang	Slalom, sitting	46.63	8	55.17	5	1:41.80	4
Liang Zilu	Slalom, sitting	DNF					
Wang Hui	Slalom, sitting	51.71	13	DNF			
Yan Hailing	Slalom, sitting	DNF					
Chen Xinjun	Super combined, standing	1:23.75	30	DNF			
Liang Jingyi	Super combined, standing	DSQ					
Niu Shaojie	Super combined, standing	1:19.71	27	49.23	21	2:08.94	21
Sun Yanlong	Super combined, standing	1:16.87	21	45.02	14	2:01.89	16
Yan Gong	Super combined, standing	DNF					
Chen Liang	Super combined, sitting	1:15.54	8	DSQ			
Gong Zhaolin	Super combined, sitting	1:17.96	14	DNF			
Li Xiang	Super combined, sitting	1:17.75	13	47.75	6	2:05.50	6
Liang Zilu	Super combined, sitting	1:15.86	9	39.46	2	1:55.32	4
Yan Hailing	Super combined, sitting	DNF					
Li Biao	Super-G, standing	—N/a				1:16.35	23
Liang Jingyi	Super-G, standing	—N/a				1:09.11	1st place, gold medalist(s)
Niu Shaojie	Super-G, standing	—N/a				DNF	
Sun Hongsheng	Super-G, standing	—N/a				1:20.88	29
Sun Yanlong	Super-G, standing	—N/a				1:19.39	28
Chen Liang	Super-G, sitting	—N/a				1:17.41	14
Gong Zhaolin	Super-G, sitting	—N/a				DNF	
Li Xiang	Super-G, sitting	—N/a				1:20.68	19
Liang Zilu	Super-G, sitting	—N/a				1:18.00	15
Yan Hailing	Super-G, sitting	—N/a				DNF	

Women

Athlete	Event	Run 1		Run 2		Total	
Athlete	Event	Time	Rank	Time	Rank	Time	Rank
Zhu Daqing; Guide: Yan Hanhan	Downhill, visually impaired	—N/a				1:21.75	2nd place, silver medalist(s)
Zhang Mengqiu	Downhill, standing	—N/a				1.21.85	2nd place, silver medalist(s)
Liu Sitong	Downhill, sitting	—N/a				1.32.10	3rd place, bronze medalist(s)
Zhang Haiyuan	Downhill, sitting	—N/a				DNF	
Zhu Daqing; Guide: Yan Hanhan	Giant slalom, visually impaired	57.09	2	1:02.76	5	1:59.85	2nd place, silver medalist(s)
Guo Jiaxin	Giant slalom, standing	1:06.52	12	1:09.63	9	2:16.15	8
Wang Qingyun	Giant slalom, standing	1:14.43	17	1:15.60	13	2:30.03	14
Zhang Mengqiu	Giant slalom, standing	56.07	1	59.05	1	1:55.12	1st place, gold medalist(s)
Han Shasha	Giant slalom, sitting	1:09.88	7	1:15.37	7	2:25.25	7
Liu Sitong	Giant slalom, sitting	1:00.72	1	1:08.83	4	2:09.55	2nd place, silver medalist(s)
Zhang Haiyuan	Giant slalom, sitting	1:06.62	6	1:14.37	6	2:20.99	6
Zhang Wenjing	Giant slalom, sitting	1:05.21	5	1:05.71	2	2:10.92	3rd place, bronze medalist(s)
Zhu Daqing; Guide: Yan Hanhan	Slalom, visually impaired	50.04	8	DNF			
Guo Jiaxin	Slalom, standing	DNF					
Wang Qingyun	Slalom, standing	1:05.61	11	1:01.78	9	2:07.39	10
Zhang Mengqiu	Slalom, standing	47.77	2	49.63	2	1:37.40	2nd place, silver medalist(s)
Han Shasha	Slalom, sitting	52.36	4	52.58	5	1:44.94	4
Liu Sitong	Slalom, sitting	49.96	2	51.35	3	1:41.31	3rd place, bronze medalist(s)
Zhang Haiyuan	Slalom, sitting	DNF					
Zhang Wenjing	Slalom, sitting	51.11	3	49.07	1	1:40.18	2nd place, silver medalist(s)
Zhu Daqing; Guide: Yan Hanhan	Super combined, visually impaired	1:16.65	1	47.60	4	2:04.25	2nd place, silver medalist(s)
Guo Jiaxin	Super combined, standing	DSQ					
Zhang Mengqiu	Super combined, standing	1:13.77	1	44.25	2	1:58.02	2nd place, silver medalist(s)
Liu Sitong	Super combined, sitting	1:23.21	2	52.63	3	2:15.84	3rd place, bronze medalist(s)
Zhang Wenjing	Super combined, sitting	DNF					
Zhu Daqing; Guide: Yan Hanhan	Super-G, visually impaired	—N/a				1:19.30	3rd place, bronze medalist(s)
Guo Jiaxin	Super-G, standing	—N/a				1:30.36	12
Zhang Mengqiu	Super-G, standing	—N/a				1:13.54	1st place, gold medalist(s)
Liu Sitong	Super-G, sitting	—N/a				DNF	
Zhang Wenjing	Super-G, sitting	—N/a				1:24.31	3rd place, bronze medalist(s)

== Biathlon ==
China competed in biathlon.

Men

Athlete	Events	Final		
Athlete	Events	Missed Shots	Result	Rank
Dang Hesong; Guide: Qin Haiyang	6 km, visually impaired	2	19:08.0	8
Yu Shuang; Guide: Wang Guanyu	6 km, visually impaired	1	17:49.9	4
Liu Mengtao	6 km, sitting	1	19:33.3	3rd place, bronze medalist(s)
Liu Zixu	6 km, sitting	0	18:51.5	1st place, gold medalist(s)
Dang Hesong; Guide: Qin Haiyang	10 km, visually impaired	4	37:00.9	6
Yu Shuang; Guide: Wang Guanyu	10 km, visually impaired	11	43:04.2	8
Liu Mengtao	10 km, sitting	3	30:37.7	1st place, gold medalist(s)
Dang Hesong; Guide: Qin Haiyang	12.5 km, visually impaired	5	50:37.8	6
Yu Shuang; Guide: Wang Guanyu	12.5 km, visually impaired	4	46:35.3	3rd place, bronze medalist(s)
Li Taiyun	12.5 km, standing	1	45.09.9	6
Wu Gaoqun	12.5 km, standing	3	42.52.9	4
Wu Junbao	12.5 km, standing	5	49.31.7	10
Yuan Mingshou	12.5 km, standing	2	46.49.0	9
Liu Mengtao	12.5 km, sitting	0	38:29.4	1st place, gold medalist(s)
Liu Zixu	12.5 km, sitting	1	39:27.5	3rd place, bronze medalist(s)
Wang Tao	12.5 km, sitting	1	41.03.8	5
Zhu Yunfeng	12.5 km, sitting	3	46.24.4	14

Women

Athlete	Events	Final		
Athlete	Events	Missed Shots	Result	Rank
Wang Yue; Guide: Li Yalin	6 km, visually impaired	1	22:49.7	4
Yang Qianru; Guide: Yu Hongshun	6 km, visually impaired	1	22:57.8	5
Guo Yujie	6 km, standing	1	19:43.3	1st place, gold medalist(s)
Li Huiling	6 km, standing	1	20:54.2	9
Wang Ruo	6 km, standing	0	22:10.8	12
Zhao Zhiqing	6 km, standing	1	20:05.1	3rd place, bronze medalist(s)
Chu Beibei	6 km, sitting	3	25:02.2	8
Shan Yilin	6 km, sitting	0	21:06.3	2nd place, silver medalist(s)
Wang Shiyu	6 km, sitting	0	22:22.1	4
Zhai Yuxin	6 km, sitting	1	23:48.6	6
Wang Yue; Guide: Li Yalin	10 km, visually impaired	4	42:50.3	3rd place, bronze medalist(s)
Yang Qianru; Guide: Yu Hongshun	10 km, visually impaired	4	48:36.6	5
Guo Yujie	10 km, standing	3	37:18.3	4
Li Huiling	10 km, standing	2	39:53.5	9
Wang Ruo	10 km, standing	5	43:40.2	12
Chu Beibei	10 km, sitting	0	38:15.4	7
Shan Yilin	10 km, sitting	2	37:17.8	4
Wang Shiyu	10 km, sitting	3	37:37.4	6
Zhai Yuxin	10 km, sitting	2	37:20.3	5
Yang Qianru; Guide: Yu Hongshun	12.5 km, visually impaired	2	1:00.10.1	5
Guo Yujie	12.5 km, standing	2	50:04.4	7
Li Huiling	12.5 km, standing	3	54:10.6	8
Wang Ruo	12.5 km, standing	1	55:05.9	11
Zhao Zhiqing	12.5 km, standing	1	48:06.3	2nd place, silver medalist(s)
Chu Beibei	12.5 km, sitting	1	46:59.1	5
Shan Yilin	12.5 km, sitting	0	42:36.6	3rd place, bronze medalist(s)
Wang Shiyu	12.5 km, sitting	0	48:15.7	8
Zhai Yuxin	12.5 km, sitting	1	47:43.2	6

== Cross-country skiing ==
China competed in cross-country skiing.

Men

Athlete	Class	Event	Qualification		Semifinal		Final	
Athlete	Class	Event	Time	Rank	Time	Rank	Time	Rank
Cai Jiayun	LW8	Sprint, standing	2:47.26	4 Q	3:18.4	1 Q	3:12.2	4
Cai Jiayun	LW8	Middle distance, standing	—N/a				33:18.0	3rd place, bronze medalist(s)
Cai Jiayun	LW8	Long distance, standing	—N/a				54:27.7	2nd place, silver medalist(s)
Dang Hesong; Guide: Qin H.	B2	Middle distance, visually impaired	—N/a				37:03.8	8
Du Tian	LW11	Sprint, sitting	2:30.42	16	Did not advance			
Du Tian	LW11	Middle distance, sitting	—N/a				33:19.9	5
Du Tian	LW11	Long distance, sitting	—N/a				47:44.1	4
Li Taiyun	LW8	Long distance, standing	—N/a				56:47.0	6
Liu Mengtao	LW12	Middle distance, sitting	—N/a				33:47.5	6
Liu Xiaobin	LW5/7	Sprint, standing	2:49.10	5 Q	3:40.7	5	Did not advance	
Liu Xiaobin	LW5/7	Middle distance, standing	—N/a				34:40.4	4
Liu Zixu	LW12	Sprint, sitting	2:23.38	4 Q	2:55.2	2 Q	2:55.4	4
Ma Mingtao	LW5/7	Middle distance, standing	—N/a				43:23.4	18
Ma Mingtao	LW5/7	Long distance, standing	—N/a				58:32.9	9
Mao Zhongwu	LW10	Sprint, sitting	2:20.03	3 Q	2:53.4	2 Q	2:44.9	2nd place, silver medalist(s)
Mao Zhongwu	LW10	Middle distance, sitting	—N/a				29:10.7	1st place, gold medalist(s)
Mao Zhongwu	LW10	Long distance, sitting	—N/a				43:23.8	2nd place, silver medalist(s)
Qiu Mingyang	LW5/7	Sprint, standing	3:07.43	20	Did not advance			
Qiu Mingyang	LW5/7	Middle distance, standing	—N/a				36:13.5	6
Qiu Mingyang	LW5/7	Long distance, standing	—N/a				54:29.7	3rd place, bronze medalist(s)
Wang Chenyang	LW5/7	Sprint, standing	2:50.44	7 Q	3:40.0	6	Did not advance	
Wang Chenyang	LW5/7	Middle distance, standing	—N/a				33:07.8	1st place, gold medalist(s)
Wang Chenyang	LW5/7	Long distance, standing	—N/a				58:03.1	8
Wang Tao	LW12	Sprint, sitting	2:23.55	6 Q	2:54.8	3 Q	2:57.5	5
Wu Gaoqun	LW6	Sprint, standing	2:57.89	14	Did not advance			
Wu Junbao	LW5/7	Sprint, standing	2:57.45	13	Did not advance			
Xu He; Guide: Diao C.	B2	Sprint, visually impaired	2:51.01	11	Did not advance			
Xu He; Guide: Diao C.	B2	Middle distance, visually impaired	—N/a				37:49.3	10
Xu He; Guide: Diao C.	B2	Long distance, visually impaired	—N/a				1:02:16.9	5
Yu Shuang; Guide: Wang Guanyu	B2	Sprint, visually impaired	2:49.24	8 Q	4:07.5	4	Did not advance	
Zheng Peng	LW10	Sprint, sitting	2:14.17	1 Q	2:49.5	1 Q	2:42.4	1st place, gold medalist(s)
Zheng Peng	LW10	Middle distance, sitting	—N/a				30:08.4	2nd place, silver medalist(s)
Zheng Peng	LW10	Long distance, sitting	—N/a				43:09.2	1st place, gold medalist(s)
Zhu Yunfeng	LW12	Sprint, sitting	2:24.98	10 Q	2:55.3	4	Did not advance	

Women

Athlete	Class	Event	Qualification		Semifinal		Final	
Athlete	Class	Event	Time	Rank	Time	Rank	Time	Rank
Chu Beibei	LW12	Sprint, sitting	3:04.90	11 Q	3:46.4	4	Did not advance	
Guo Yujie	LW8	Sprint, standing	3:23.98	7 Q	5:00.0	4	Did not advance	
Huang Bangjuan	LW8	Sprint, standing	3:44.15	11 Q	5:17.7	6	Did not advance	
Huang Bangjuan	LW8	Middle distance, standing	—N/a				46:40.2	13
Huang Bangjuan	LW8	Long distance, standing	—N/a				55:34.3	7
Li Huiling	LW8	Sprint, standing	3:41.34	10 Q	5:09.0	5	Did not advance	
Li Panpan	LW10.5	Sprint, sitting	2:42.59	2 Q	3:40.0	2 Q	3:31.0	3rd place, bronze medalist(s)
Li Panpan	LW10.5	Middle distance, sitting	—N/a				26:31.1	4
Li Panpan	LW10.5	Long distance, sitting	—N/a				45:17.0	3rd place, bronze medalist(s)
Ma Jing	LW10.5	Sprint, sitting	2:50.42	5 Q	3:40.9	4	Did not advance	
Ma Jing	LW10.5	Middle distance, sitting	—N/a				26:22.9	3rd place, bronze medalist(s)
Ma Jing	LW10.5	Long distance, sitting	—N/a				46:43.9	5
Shan Yilin	LW12	Middle distance, sitting	—N/a				27:40.3	5
Wang Ruo	LW8	Sprint, standing	3:53.19	13	Did not advance			
Wang Shiyu	LW12	Sprint, sitting	2:57.03	8 Q	3:35.9	2 Q	3:31.3	4
Wang Yue; Guide: Li Yalin	B2	Sprint, visually impaired	3:46.19	7 Q	3:59.9	3	Did not advance	
Wang Yue; Guide: Li Yalin	B2	Middle distance, visually impaired	—N/a				42:20.3	2nd place, silver medalist(s)
Wang Yue; Guide: Li Yalin	B2	Long distance, visually impaired	—N/a				57:05.9	4
Yang Hongqiong	LW10	Sprint, sitting	2:45.08	3 Q	3:35.0	1 Q	3:18.2	1st place, gold medalist(s)
Yang Hongqiong	LW10	Middle distance, sitting	—N/a				24:47.5	1st place, gold medalist(s)
Yang Hongqiong	LW10	Long distance, sitting	—N/a				43:06.7	1st place, gold medalist(s)
Yang Qianru; Guide: Yu Hongshun	B2	Sprint, visually impaired	3:43.00	6 Q	4:23.7	4	Did not advance	
Zhai Yuxin	LW12	Middle distance, sitting	—N/a				29:26.9	9
Zhao Zhiqing	LW5/7	Sprint, standing	3:17.28	5 Q	4:21.8	3	4:21.5	4
Zhao Zhiqing	LW5/7	Long distance, standing	—N/a				49:59.8	4

Relay

Athletes	Event	Time	Rank
Shan Yilin; Wang Chenyang; Zheng Peng; Cai Jiayun	Mixed relay	26:25.3	2nd place, silver medalist(s)
Xu He; Guide: Diao C. Dang Hesong; Guide: Qin H. Mao Zhongwu; Yu Shuang; Guide: Wang Guanyu	Open relay	29:01.9	4

== Para ice hockey ==
China automatically qualified as the host.

Summary

Team	Event	Preliminary round				Quarterfinal	Semifinal	Final / BM / Pl.	
Team	Event	Opposition Result	Opposition Result	Opposition Result	Rank	Opposition Result	Opposition Result	Opposition Result	Rank
China national team	Mixed tournament	Slovakia; W 7–0	Czech Republic; W 5–2	Italy; W 6–0	1 Q	Czech Republic; W 4–3	United States; L 0–11	South Korea; W 4–0	3rd place, bronze medalist(s)

Preliminary round

Pos	Team	Pld	W	OTW	OTL	L	GF	GA	GD	Pts	Qualification
1	China (H)	3	3	0	0	0	18	2	+16	9	Quarterfinals
2	Czech Republic	3	2	0	0	1	10	5	+5	6	Quarterfinals
3	Italy	3	0	1	0	2	2	12	−10	2	Quarterfinals
4	Slovakia	3	0	0	1	2	1	12	−11	1	Eliminated

Source: Beijing 2022
(H) Host

5 March 2022; 20:05	Slovakia	0–7 (0–2, 0–1, 0–4)	China	Beijing National Indoor Stadium, Beijing; Attendance: 1,230

Game reference

Eduard Lepáček
Goalies
Ji Yanzhao
Referee:
(Canada) Kevin Webinger
Linesmen:
(Netherlands) Louis Beelen
(Czech Republic) Jan Vaněk

0–1	08:39 – Shen (SH)
0–2	13:01 – Shen (Wang Z.)
0–3	19:43 – Cui (Wang Z., Shen)
0–4	32:51 – Shen (Wang Z.) (SH)
0–5	38:00 – Li (Lyu)
0–6	41:21 – Shen (Cui)
0–7	43:58 – Tian (Zhu, Ji) (PP)

8 min
Penalties
10 min
8
Shots
28

6 March 2022; 20:05	China	5–2 (0–0, 5–1, 0–1)	Czech Republic	Beijing National Indoor Stadium, Beijing; Attendance: 1,207

Game reference

Ji Yanzhao
Goalies
Martin Kudela
Michal Vápenka
Referee:
(United States) Bobby Esposito
Linesmen:
(Serbia) Tibor Fazekaš
(Sweden) Andreas Lundén

Shen (Wang Z.) – 15:11	1–0
Zhu (Xu, Shen) (PP) – 17:38	2–0
Wang J. – 17:53	3–0
Tian (Li) (SH) – 21:06	4–0
	4–1	21:53 – Ohar (Doležal, Veselý)
Li (Lyu) (SH) – 29:52	5–1
	5–2	43:04 – Krupička (Hečko, Sedláček)

14 min
Penalties
16 min
21
Shots
8

8 March 2022; 16:35	Italy	0–6 (0–4, 0–2, 0–0)	China	Beijing National Indoor Stadium, Beijing; Attendance: 1,224

Game reference

Julian Kasslatter
Gabriele Araudo
Goalies
Wang Wei
Referee:
(Denmark) Jacob Grumsen
Linesmen:
(Sweden) Tony Rundström
(Czech Republic) Jan Vaněk

0–1	00:16 – Wang Z. (Shen)
0–2	02:41 – Bai (Wang Z.)
0–3	03:52 – Qiu (Li, Tian)
0–4	12:08 – Hu (Tian) (PP2)
0–5	17:42 – Wang Z. (Tian, Li)
0–6	25:23 – Qiu (Lyu)

22 min
Penalties
10 min
1
Shots
25

Quarterfinal

9 March 2022; 20:05	China	4–3 (1–1, 1–0, 2–2)	Czech Republic	Beijing National Indoor Stadium, Beijing

Game reference

Ji Yanzhao
Goalies
Martin Kudela
Referee:
(Norway) Owe Lüthcke
Linesmen:
(Austria) David Nothegger
(Sweden) Tony Rundström

Wang Z. (Cui, Zhu) – 06:48	1–0
	1–1	08:06 – Geier (Hábl, Wagner)
Tian (Cui) – 20:29	2–1
Shen (Cui, Wang Z.) (PP) – 30:29	3–1
	3–2	32:41 – Hečko (Ohar)
	3–3	39:01 – Novotný (Geier, Hábl) (PP)
Wang Z. (Shen) – 43:09	4–3

10 min
Penalties
4 min
16
Shots
12

Semifinal

11 March 2022; 20:05	United States	11–0 (4–0, 5–0, 2–0)	China	Beijing National Indoor Stadium, Beijing; Attendance: 987

Game reference

Jen Lee
Goalies
Ji Yanzhao
Wang Wei
Referee:
(Canada) Kevin Webinger
Linesmen:
(Canada) Matt Fergenbaum
(Sweden) Andreas Lundén

Roybal (Farmer) – 05:23	1–0
Roybal (Farmer) – 05:55	2–0
Misiewicz (Farmer, Zych) – 08:45	3–0
Roybal (Farmer, Misiewicz) (PP) – 14:05	4–0
Misiewicz (Pauls) – 17:59	5–0
Farmer (Misiewicz, Roybal) (PP) – 19:47	6–0
Jones (Wallace, Roybal) (PP) – 22:31	7–0
Farmer (Zych) – 23:13	8–0
Woodke (Zych, Wallace) (PP) – 27:40	9–0
Roybal (Wallace, Jones) – 31:57	10–0
Pauls – 33:02	11–0

6 min
Penalties
12 min
37
Shots
6

Bronze medal game

12 March 2022; 20:05	China	4–0 (1–0, 1–0, 2–0)	South Korea	Beijing National Indoor Stadium, Beijing; Attendance: 492

Game reference

Ji Yanzhao
Goalies
Lee Jae-woong
Referee:
(Canada) Kevin Webinger
Linesmen:
(Canada) Matt Fergenbaum
(Sweden) Tony Rundström

Wang Z. (Shen, Zhu) – 04:06	1–0
Shen – 16:00	2–0
Li (Shen, Zhu) – 43:15	3–0
Shen (Wang Z.) (ENG) – 44:48	4–0

22 min
Penalties
16 min
23
Shots
11

== Snowboarding ==
China competed in snowboarding.

Slalom

Men

Athlete	Event	Run 1	Run 2	Best	Rank
Liu Kaiyang	Banked slalom, SB-LL1	1:13.29	1:13.44	1:13.29	6
Liu Yiyang	Banked slalom, SB-LL1	1:16.80	1:15.08	1:15.08	8
Wu Zhongwei	Banked slalom, SB-LL1	1:09.73	1:10.77	1:09.73	1st place, gold medalist(s)
He Yipeng	Banked slalom, SB-LL2	1:14.24	1:13.50	1:13.50	14
Liu Gengliang	Banked slalom, SB-LL2	1:14.49	1:16.79	1:14.49	17
Sun Qi	Banked slalom, SB-LL2	1:09.73	1:10.77	1:09.73	1st place, gold medalist(s)
Xu Xiang	Banked slalom, SB-LL2	1:11.73	DNF	1:11.73	10
Yan Wendi	Banked slalom, SB-LL2	1:12.20	1:12.41	1:12.20	12
Ji Lijia	Banked slalom, SB-UL	1:09.86	1:10.16	1:09.86	2nd place, silver medalist(s)
Jiang Zihao	Banked slalom, SB-UL	1:11.49	1:11.16	1:11.16	6
Wang Pengyao	Banked slalom, SB-UL	1:10.24	1:10.18	1:10.18	4
Yang Jian	Banked slalom, SB-UL	1:11.84	1:11.71	1:11.71	7
Zhu Yonggang	Banked slalom, SB-UL	1:34.54	1:10.14	1:10.14	3rd place, bronze medalist(s)

Women

Athlete	Event	Run 1	Run 2	Best	Rank
Geng Yanhong	Banked slalom, SB-LL2	1:19.16	1:17.38	1:17.38	2nd place, silver medalist(s)
Hu Nianjia	Banked slalom, SB-LL2	1:18.05	1:19.02	1:18.05	4
Li Tiantian	Banked slalom, SB-LL2	1:18.77	1:17.46	1:17.46	3rd place, bronze medalist(s)
Wang Xinyu	Banked slalom, SB-LL2	1:18.62	1:18.31	1:18.31	5

Snowboard cross

Men

Athlete	Event	Seeding		Quarterfinal	Semifinal	Final	
Athlete	Event	Time	Rank	Position	Position	Position	Rank
Liu Kaiyang	Snowboard cross, SB-LL1	1:09.67	10 Q	3	Did not advance		
Liu Yiyang	Snowboard cross, SB-LL1	1:07.17	4 Q	1 Q	4 FB	4	8
Wu Zhongwei	Snowboard cross, SB-LL1	1:05.03	2 Q	1 Q	2 FA	3	3rd place, bronze medalist(s)
Liu Gengliang	Snowboard cross, SB-LL2	1:06.76	14 Q	4	Did not advance		
Sun Qi	Snowboard cross, SB-LL2	1:03.90	7 Q	2 Q	1 FA	4	4
Xu Xiang	Snowboard cross, SB-LL2	1:08.25	18	Did not advance			
Yan Wendi	Snowboard cross, SB-LL2	DNF	—N/a	Did not advance			
Ji Lijia	Snowboard cross, SB-UL	1:03.34	4 Q	1 Q	1 FA	1	1st place, gold medalist(s)
Jiang Zihao	Snowboard cross, SB-UL	1:04.09	10 Q	2 Q	3 FB	3	7
Wang Pengyao	Snowboard cross, SB-UL	1:03.12	3 Q	1 Q	1 FA	2	2nd place, silver medalist(s)
Yang Jian	Snowboard cross, SB-UL	1:03.03	2 Q	3	Did not advance		
Zhang Yiqi	Snowboard cross, SB-UL	1:03.89	7 Q	1 Q	2 FA	DSQ	4
Zhu Yonggang	Snowboard cross, SB-UL	1:02.81	1 Q	1 Q	2 FA	3	3rd place, bronze medalist(s)

Qualification legend: Q - Qualify to next round; FA - Qualify to medal final; FB - Qualify to consolation final

Women

Athlete	Event	Seeding		Quarterfinal	Semifinal	Final	
Athlete	Event	Time	Rank	Position	Position	Position	Rank
Geng Yanhong	Snowboard cross, SB-LL2	1:16.36	7 Q	3	Did not advance		
Hu Nianjia	Snowboard cross, SB-LL2	1:20.67	10 Q	2 Q	3 FB	3	7
Li Tiantian	Snowboard cross, SB-LL2	1:14.76	6 Q	2 Q	4 FB	2	6
Wang Xinyu	Snowboard cross, SB-LL2	1:21.15	11 Q	3	Did not advance		

Qualification legend: Q - Qualify to next round; FA - Qualify to medal final; FB - Qualify to consolation final

== Wheelchair curling ==
China automatically qualified as the host.

Summary

Team	Event	Group stage											Semifinal	Final	
Team	Event	Opposition Score	Opposition Score	Opposition Score	Opposition Score	Opposition Score	Opposition Score	Opposition Score	Opposition Score	Opposition Score	Opposition Score	Rank	Opposition Score	Opposition Score	Rank
Wang Haitao; Chen Jianxin; Zhang Mingliang; Yan Zhou; Sun Yulong	Mixed tournament	CAN; L 3–7	SWE; L 1–5	EST; W 9–3	KOR; W 9–4	SUI; W 7–4	USA; W 10–2	SVK; W 7–5	NOR; W 7–4	GBR; W 6–3	LAT; W 9–2	1 Q	CAN; W 9–5	SWE; W 8–3	1st place, gold medalist(s)

Round robin Final round-robin standings

Key
Teams to Playoffs

Country	Skip	W	L	W–L	PF	PA	EW	EL	BE	SE	S%	DSC
China	Wang Haitao	8	2	–	68	39	36	28	2	13	71%	122.32
Slovakia	Radoslav Ďuriš	7	3	2–0	65	57	40	33	1	16	65%	95.19
Sweden	Viljo Petersson-Dahl	7	3	1–1	66	52	37	35	3	18	68%	91.08
Canada	Mark Ideson	7	3	0–2	69	50	36	33	2	11	71%	95.29
United States	Matthew Thums	5	5	1–0	60	75	32	39	2	6	60%	70.98
South Korea	Go Seung-nam	5	5	0–1	64	59	35	37	0	11	64%	103.20
Norway	Jostein Stordahl	4	6	2–0	60	64	37	38	2	13	64%	107.82
Great Britain	Hugh Nibloe	4	6	1–1	67	56	37	36	0	16	62%	134.75
Latvia	Poļina Rožkova	4	6	0–2	61	71	40	32	0	18	63%	100.43
Estonia	Andrei Koitmäe	3	7	–	51	69	32	41	2	13	61%	106.21
Switzerland	Laurent Kneubühl	1	9	–	48	87	32	42	0	8	56%	109.27

Wheelchair curling round robin summary table
Pos.	Country	Canada	China	Estonia	Great Britain	Japan	Norway	Slovakia	South Korea	Sweden	Switzerland	United States	Record
4	Canada	—N/a	7–3	9–3	6–3	10–3	7–6	8–9	4–9	3–6	8–4	7–4	7–3
1	China	3–7	—	9–3	6–3	9–2	7–4	7–5	9–4	1–5	7–4	10–2	8–2
10	Estonia	3–9	3–9	—	5–10	6–5	8–3	6–7	2–5	4–6	8–6	6–9	3–7
8	Great Britain	3–6	3–6	10–5	—	8–4	5–7	3–7	6–8	4–6	15–1	10–6	4–6
9	Latvia	3–10	2–9	5–6	4–8	—	6–8	8–4	8–4	9–7	9–7	7–8	4–6
7	Norway	6–7	4–7	3–8	7–5	8–6	—	9–3	4–9	6–8	8–5	5–6	4–6
2	Slovakia	9–8	5–7	7–6	7–3	4–8	3–9	—	7–2	6–5	8–6	9–3	7–3
6	South Korea	9–4	4–9	5–2	8–6	4–8	9–4	2–7	—	10–4	7–8	6–7	5–5
3	Sweden	6–3	5–1	6–4	6–4	7–9	8–6	5–6	4–10	—	9–2	10–7	7–3
11	Switzerland	4–8	4–7	6–8	1–15	7–9	5–8	6–8	8–7	2–9	—	5–8	1–9
5	United States	4–7	2–10	9–6	6–10	8–7	6–5	3–9	7–6	7–10	8–5	—	5–5

Draw 1
Saturday, March 5, 14:35

Sheet B	1	2	3	4	5	6	7	8	Final
China (Wang) 🔨	1	0	1	0	0	1	0	X	3
Canada (Ideson)	0	1	0	3	1	0	2	X	7

Draw 3
Sunday, March 6, 9:35

Sheet C	1	2	3	4	5	6	7	8	Final
China (Wang)	0	0	0	0	0	0	1	X	1
Sweden (Petersson-Dahl) 🔨	0	1	0	1	2	1	0	X	5

Draw 5
Sunday, March 6, 19:35

Sheet A	1	2	3	4	5	6	7	8	Final
Estonia (Koitmäe)	0	0	1	0	0	2	0	X	3
China (Wang) 🔨	3	1	0	2	1	0	2	X	9

Draw 7
Monday, March 7, 14:35

Sheet B	1	2	3	4	5	6	7	8	Final
South Korea (Go) 🔨	0	3	0	0	1	0	X	X	4
China (Wang)	2	0	1	1	0	5	X	X	9

Draw 8
Monday, March 7, 19:35

Sheet A	1	2	3	4	5	6	7	8	Final
China (Wang)	1	0	1	0	3	0	0	2	7
Switzerland (Kneubühl) 🔨	0	1	0	2	0	1	0	0	4

Draw 11
Tuesday, March 8, 19:35

Sheet C	1	2	3	4	5	6	7	8	Final
China (Wang)	0	5	0	3	2	0	X	X	10
United States (Thums) 🔨	0	0	1	0	0	1	X	X	2

Draw 12
Wednesday, March 9, 9:35

Sheet D	1	2	3	4	5	6	7	8	Final
China (Wang) 🔨	0	2	0	0	3	2	0	X	7
Slovakia (Ďuriš)	1	0	1	1	0	0	2	X	5

Draw 13
Wednesday, March 9, 14:35

Sheet C	1	2	3	4	5	6	7	8	Final
Norway (Syversen)	0	0	0	2	0	1	1	0	4
China (Wang) 🔨	1	0	1	0	1	0	0	4	7

Draw 15
Thursday, March 10, 9:35

Sheet B	1	2	3	4	5	6	7	8	Final
China (Wang) 🔨	1	0	1	0	2	1	1	X	6
Great Britain (Nibloe)	0	2	0	1	0	0	0	X	3

Draw 17
Thursday, March 10, 19:35

Sheet A	1	2	3	4	5	6	7	8	Final
Latvia (Rožkova)	1	0	0	0	1	0	X	X	2
China (Wang) 🔨	0	2	1	3	0	3	X	X	9

Semifinal

Friday, March 11, 14:35

Sheet C	1	2	3	4	5	6	7	8	Final
China (Wang) 🔨	1	0	3	0	3	2	0	X	9
Canada (Ideson)	0	1	0	2	0	0	2	X	5

Final

Saturday, March 12, 14:35

Team	1	2	3	4	5	6	7	8	Final
China (Wang) 🔨	0	1	0	0	4	0	3	X	8
Sweden (Petersson-Dahl)	0	0	1	1	0	1	0	X	3

== See also ==
- China at the Paralympics
- China at the 2022 Winter Olympics
