= Alpine skiing at the 2022 Winter Paralympics – Women's super combined =

Women's super combined at the XIII Paralympic Winter Games
- Paralympic alpine skiing
- Venue: Yanqing National Alpine Skiing Centre
- Dates: 7 March 2022

Women's super combined (visually impaired) at the XIII Paralympic Winter Games
- Competitors: 9 from 7 nations

Medalists
1st place, gold medalist(s)		Henrieta Farkašová; Guide: Michal Cerven	Slovakia
2nd place, silver medalist(s)		Zhu Daqing; Guide: Yan Hanhan	China
3rd place, bronze medalist(s)		Menna Fitzpatrick; Guide: Gary Smith	Great Britain

Women's super combined (standing) at the XIII Paralympic Winter Games
- Competitors: 14 from 8 nations

Medalists
1st place, gold medalist(s)		Ebba Årsjö	Sweden
2nd place, silver medalist(s)		Zhang Mengqiu	China
3rd place, bronze medalist(s)		Alana Ramsay	Canada

Women's super combined (sitting) at the XIII Paralympic Winter Games
- Competitors: 8 from 6 nations

Medalists
1st place, gold medalist(s)		Anna-Lena Forster	Germany
2nd place, silver medalist(s)		Momoka Muraoka	Japan
3rd place, bronze medalist(s)		Liu Sitong	China

The Women's super combined competition of the 2022 Winter Paralympics was held at the Yanqing National Alpine Skiing Centre on 7 March 2022.

== Medal table ==
Rank	Nation	Gold	Silver	Bronze	Total
1	Germany (GER)	1	0	0	1
1	Slovakia (SVK)	1	0	0	1
1	Sweden (SWE)	1	0	0	1
4	China (CHN)*	0	2	1	3
5	Japan (JPN)	0	1	0	1
6	Canada (CAN)	0	0	1	1
6	Great Britain (GBR)	0	0	1	1
Totals (7 entries)		3	3	3	9

== Visually impaired ==
In the super combined visually impaired, the athlete with a visual impairment has a sighted guide. The two skiers are considered a team, and dual medals are awarded.

Rank	Bib	Name	Country	Super-G	Rank	Slalom	Rank	Total	Difference
1st place, gold medalist(s)	6	Henrieta Farkašová; Guide: Michal Cerven	Slovakia	1:18.57	2	44.82	2	2:03.39	–
2nd place, silver medalist(s)	8	Zhu Daqing; Guide: Yan Hanhan	China	1:16.65	1	47.60	4	2:04.25	+0.86
3rd place, bronze medalist(s)	4	Menna Fitzpatrick; Guide: Gary Smith	Great Britain	1:22.25	5	43.73	1	2:05.98	+2.59
4	3	Millie Knight; Guide: Brett Wild	Great Britain	1:21.49	4	46.40	3	2:07.89	+4.50
5	1	Linda Le Bon; Guide: Ulla Gilot	Belgium	1:26.36	6	51.48	5	2:18.20	+14.81
	2	Evangelia Nikou; Guide: Dimitrios Profetzas	Greece	1:26.46	7	DNF	—N/a		
	7	Alexandra Rexová; Guide: Eva Trajčíková	Slovakia	1:20.01	3	DNF	—N/a		
	5	Martina Vozza; Guide: Ylenia Sabidussi	Italy	DNF	—N/a				
	9	Noemi Ewa Ristau; Guide: Paula Brenzel	Germany	DSQ	—N/a				

== Standing ==
Rank	Bib	Name	Country	Super-G	Rank	Slalom	Rank	Total	Difference
1st place, gold medalist(s)	21	Ebba Årsjö	Sweden	1:16.02	2	40.49	1	1:56.51	–
2nd place, silver medalist(s)	20	Zhang Mengqiu	China	1:13.77	1	44.25	2	1:58.02	+1.51
3rd place, bronze medalist(s)	13	Alana Ramsay	Canada	1:18.71	4	47.62	4	2:06.33	+9.82
4	11	Anna-Maria Rieder	Germany	1:21.49	6	46.51	3	2:08.00	+11.49
5	10	Marie Bochet	France	1:17.34	3	54.83	7	2:12.17	+15.66
6	15	Ammi Hondo	Japan	1:21.98	7	51.42	6	2:13.40	+16.89
7	17	Petra Smaržová	Slovakia	1:28.13	9	48.47	5	2:16.60	+20.09
8	16	Vanesa Gašková	Slovakia	1:27.98	8	1:00.68	8	2:28.66	+32.15
	19	Allie Johnson	United States	1:37.51	10	DNF	—N/a		
	22	Mollie Jepsen	Canada	1:18.95	5	DNF	—N/a		
	12	Andrea Rothfuss	Germany	DSQ	—N/a				
	14	Michaela Gosselin	Canada	DSQ	—N/a				
	18	Guo Jiaxin	China	DSQ	—N/a				
	23	Noriko Kamiyama	Japan	DSQ	—N/a				

== Sitting ==
Rank	Bib	Name	Country	Super-G	Rank	Slalom	Rank	Total	Difference
1st place, gold medalist(s)	24	Anna-Lena Forster	Germany	1:26.44	4	44.93	1	2:11.37	–
2nd place, silver medalist(s)	25	Momoka Muraoka	Japan	1:20.37	1	51.77	2	2:12.14	+0.77
3rd place, bronze medalist(s)	28	Liu Sitong	China	1:23.21	2	52.63	3	2:15.84	+4.47
4	30	Yoshiko Tanaka	Japan	1:36.33	5	1:08.81	4	2:45.14	+33.77
	27	Shona Brownlee	Great Britain	1:46.91	6	DNF	—N/a		
	31	Barbara van Bergen	Netherlands	1:23.76	3	DSQ	—N/a		
	29	Zhang Wenjing	China	DNF	—N/a				
	26	Katie Combaluzier	Canada	DNF	—N/a				

== See also ==
- Alpine skiing at the 2022 Winter Olympics
