= Alpine skiing at the 2022 Winter Paralympics – Women's super-G =

Women's super-G at the XIII Paralympic Winter Games
- Paralympic alpine skiing
- Venue: Yanqing National Alpine Skiing Centre
- Dates: 6 March 2022

Women's super-G (visually impaired) at the XIII Paralympic Winter Games
- Competitors: 9 from 7 nations

Medalists
1st place, gold medalist(s)		Alexandra Rexová; Guide: Eva Trajčíková	Slovakia
2nd place, silver medalist(s)		Menna Fitzpatrick; Guide: Gary Smith	Great Britain
3rd place, bronze medalist(s)		Zhu Daqing; Guide: Yan Hanhan	China

Women's super-G (standing) at the XIII Paralympic Winter Games
- Competitors: 15 from 9 nations

Medalists
1st place, gold medalist(s)		Zhang Mengqiu	China
2nd place, silver medalist(s)		Marie Bochet	France
3rd place, bronze medalist(s)		Alana Ramsay	Canada

Women's super-G (sitting) at the XIII Paralympic Winter Games
- Competitors: 8 from 6 nations

Medalists
1st place, gold medalist(s)		Momoka Muraoka	Japan
2nd place, silver medalist(s)		Anna-Lena Forster	Germany
3rd place, bronze medalist(s)		Zhang Wenjing	China

The women's super-G competition of the 2022 Winter Paralympics was held at the Yanqing National Alpine Skiing Centre on 6 March 2022.

== Medal table ==
* Host nation (China)

Rank	Nation	Gold	Silver	Bronze	Total
1	China (CHN)*	1	0	2	3
2	Japan (JPN)	1	0	0	1
2	Slovakia (SVK)	1	0	0	1
4	France (FRA)	0	1	0	1
4	Germany (GER)	0	1	0	1
4	Great Britain (GBR)	0	1	0	1
7	Canada (CAN)	0	0	1	1
Totals (7 entries)		3	3	3	9

== Visually impaired ==
In the super-G visually impaired, the athlete with a visual impairment has a sighted guide. The two skiers are considered a team, and dual medals are awarded.

Rank	Bib	Name	Country	Time	Difference
1st place, gold medalist(s)	4	Alexandra Rexová; Guide: Eva Trajčíková	Slovakia	1:17.01	–
2nd place, silver medalist(s)	2	Menna Fitzpatrick; Guide: Gary Smith	Great Britain	1:18.79	+1.78
3rd place, bronze medalist(s)	8	Zhu Daqing; Guide: Yan Hanhan	China	1:19.30	+2.29
4	7	Millie Knight; Guide: Brett Wild	Great Britain	1:19.39	+2.38
5	5	Noemi Ewa Ristau; Guide: Paula Brenzel	Germany	1:22.31	+5.30
6	9	Evangelia Nikou; Guide: Dimitrios Profetzas	Greece	1:25.25	+8.24
7	6	Linda Le Bon; Guide: Ulla Gilot	Belgium	1:26.98	+9.97
	1	Martina Vozza; Guide: Ylenia Sabidussi	Italy	DNF	
	3	Henrieta Farkašová; Guide: Michal Cerven	Slovakia	DNF	

== Standing ==
Rank	Bib	Name	Country	Time	Difference
1st place, gold medalist(s)	15	Zhang Mengqiu	China	1:13.54	–
2nd place, silver medalist(s)	18	Marie Bochet	France	1:14.97	+0.43
3rd place, bronze medalist(s)	14	Alana Ramsay	Canada	1:16.84	+3.30
4	12	Ebba Årsjö	Sweden	1:16.93	+3.39
5	17	Anna-Maria Rieder	Germany	1:18.63	+5.09
6	10	Mollie Jepsen	Canada	1:18.69	+5.15
7	13	Michaela Gosselin	Canada	1:19.64	+6.10
8	19	Ammi Hondo	Japan	1:19.92	+6.38
9	16	Andrea Rothfuss	Germany	1:22.35	+8.81
10	21	Noriko Kamiyama	Japan	1:27.73	+14.19
11	20	Petra Smaržová	Slovakia	1:29.42	+15.88
12	22	Guo Jiaxin	China	1:30.36	+16.82
13	23	Vanesa Gašková	Slovakia	1:31.60	+18.06
14	24	Allie Johnson	United States	1:39.50	+25.96
	11	Laura Văleanu	Romania	DSQ	

== Sitting ==
Rank	Bib	Name	Country	Time	Difference
1st place, gold medalist(s)	26	Momoka Muraoka	Japan	1:23.73	–
2nd place, silver medalist(s)	25	Anna-Lena Forster	Germany	1:23.84	+0.11
3rd place, bronze medalist(s)	27	Zhang Wenjing	China	1:24.31	+0.58
4	28	Barbara van Bergen	Netherlands	1:28.42	+4.69
5	31	Yoshiko Tanaka	Japan	1:35.69	+11.96
6	30	Shona Brownlee	Great Britain	1:48.23	+24.50
	29	Liu Sitong	China	DNF	
	32	Katie Combaluzier	Canada	DNF	

== See also ==
- Alpine skiing at the 2022 Winter Olympics
