= Alpine skiing at the 2022 Winter Paralympics – Women's slalom =

Women's slalom at the XIII Paralympic Winter Games
- Paralympic alpine skiing
- Venue: Yanqing National Alpine Skiing Centre
- Dates: 12 March 2022

Women's slalom (visually impaired) at the XIII Paralympic Winter Games
- Competitors: 15 from 10 nations

Medalists
1st place, gold medalist(s)		Veronika Aigner; Guide: Elisabeth Aigner	Austria
2nd place, silver medalist(s)		Barbara Aigner; Guide: Klara Sykora	Austria
3rd place, bronze medalist(s)		Alexandra Rexová; Guide: Eva Trajčíková	Slovakia

Women's giant slalom (standing) at the XIII Paralympic Winter Games
- Competitors: 20 from 13 nations

Medalists
1st place, gold medalist(s)		Ebba Årsjö	Sweden
2nd place, silver medalist(s)		Zhang Mengqiu	China
3rd place, bronze medalist(s)		Anna-Maria Rieder	Germany

Women's giant slalom (sitting) at the XIII Paralympic Winter Games
- Competitors: 13 from 8 nations

Medalists
1st place, gold medalist(s)		Anna-Lena Forster	Germany
2nd place, silver medalist(s)		Zhang Wenjing	China
3rd place, bronze medalist(s)		Liu Sitong	China

The Women's slalom competition of the 2022 Winter Paralympics was held at the Yanqing National Alpine Skiing Centre in Beijing on 12 March 2022.

== Medal table ==
Rank	Nation	Gold	Silver	Bronze	Total
1	Austria (AUT)	1	1	0	2
2	Germany (GER)	1	0	1	2
3	Sweden (SWE)	1	0	0	1
4	China (CHN)*	0	2	1	3
5	Slovakia (SVK)	0	0	1	1
Totals (5 entries)		3	3	3	9

== Visually impaired ==
In the slalom visually impaired, the athlete with a visual impairment has a sighted guide. The two skiers are considered a team, and dual medals are awarded.

Rank	Bib	Name	Country	Run 1	Rank	Run 2	Rank	Total	Difference
1st place, gold medalist(s)	7	Veronika Aigner; Guide: Elisabeth Aigner	Austria	44.12	1	47.41	1	1:31.53	–
2nd place, silver medalist(s)	3	Barbara Aigner; Guide: Klara Sykora	Austria	45.11	2	48.13	2	1:33.24	+1.71
3rd place, bronze medalist(s)	1	Alexandra Rexová; Guide: Eva Trajčíková	Slovakia	46.38	3	49.93	5	1:36.31	+4.78
4	4	Menna Fitzpatrick; Guide: Katie Guest	Great Britain	47.25	5	49.51	3	1:36.76	+5.23
5	5	Henrieta Farkašová; Guide: Martin Motyka	Slovakia	46.70	4	50.30	6	1:37.00	+5.47
6	9	Elina Stary; Guide: Celine Arthofer	Austria	48.08	6	49.76	4	1:37.84	+6.31
7	2	Chiara Mazzel; Guide: Fabrizio Casal	Italy	48.39	7	51.21	9	1:39.60	+8.07
8	8	Millie Knight; Guide: Brett Wild	Great Britain	50.35	9	51.12	8	1:41.47	+9.94
9	13	Noemi Ewa Ristau; Guide: Paula Brenzel	Germany	51.69	11	50.65	7	1:42.34	+10.81
10	15	Sara Choi; Guide: Kim Yoo-seong	South Korea	55.33	12	54.04	11	1:49.37	+17.84
11	14	Linda Le Bon; Guide: Ulla Gilot	Belgium	56.11	13	53.99	10	1:50.10	+18.57
	6	Zhu Daqing; Guide: Yan Hanhan	China	50.04	8	DNF	—N/a		
	12	Melissa Perrine; Guide: Bobbi Kelly	Australia	50.96	10	DNF	—N/a		
	10	Martina Vozza; Guide: Ylenia Sabidussi	Italy	DNF	—N/a				
	11	Danelle Umstead; Guide: Rob Umstead	United States	DNF	—N/a				

== Standing ==
Rank	Bib	Name	Country	Run 1	Rank	Run 2	Rank	Total	Difference
1st place, gold medalist(s)	20	Ebba Årsjö	Sweden	44.99	1	46.77	1	1:31.76	–
2nd place, silver medalist(s)	27	Zhang Mengqiu	China	47.77	2	49.63	2	1:37.40	+5.64
3rd place, bronze medalist(s)	23	Anna-Maria Rieder	Germany	48.97	3	51.53	3	1:40.50	+8.74
4	22	Michaela Gosselin	Canada	51.60	5	55.27	4	1:46.87	+15.11
5	26	Lucija Smetiško	Croatia	53.41	6	56.37	5	1:49.78	+18.02
6	30	Ammi Hondo	Japan	57.97	7	59.49	7	1:57.46	+25.70
7	18	Rae Anderson	Australia	1:01.47	9	59.01	6	2:00.48	+28.72
8	21	Noriko Kamiyama	Japan	1:01.24	8	1:01.71	8	2:02.95	+31.19
9	33	Vanesa Gašková	Slovakia	1:03.34	10	1:03.52	10	2:06.86	+35.10
10	32	Wang Qingyun	China	1:05.61	11	1:01.78	9	2:07.39	+36.63
11	34	Claudia Hernández	Chile	1:49.01	13	1:45.86	11	3:34.87	+2:03.11
	19	Marie Bochet	France	49.49	4	DNF	—N/a		
	35	Ilma Kazazić	Bosnia and Herzegovina	1:14.21	12	DNF	—N/a		
	16	Allie Johnson	United States	DNF	—N/a				
	17	Alana Ramsay	Canada	DNF	—N/a				
	24	Petra Smaržová	Slovakia	DNF	—N/a				
	25	Andrea Rothfuss	Germany	DNF	—N/a				
	29	Guo Jiaxin	China	DNF	—N/a				
	31	Eva-Maria Joechl	Austria	DNF	—N/a				
	28	Mollie Jepsen	Canada	DNS	—N/a				

== Sitting ==
Rank	Bib	Name	Country	Run 1	Rank	Run 2	Rank	Total	Difference
1st place, gold medalist(s)	39	Anna-Lena Forster	Germany	48.50	1	49.36	2	1:37.86	–
2nd place, silver medalist(s)	36	Zhang Wenjing	China	51.11	3	49.07	1	1:40.18	+2.32
3rd place, bronze medalist(s)	37	Liu Sitong	China	49.96	2	51.35	3	1:41.31	+3.45
4	46	Han Shasha	China	52.36	4	52.58	5	1:44.94	+7.08
5	38	Momoka Muraoka	Japan	53.44	5	52.10	4	1:45.54	+7.68
6	40	Yoshiko Tanaka	Japan	1:10.78	8	1:05.15	6	2:15.93	+38.07
7	44	Katie Combaluzier	Canada	1:09.75	6	1:06.63	7	2:16.38	+38.52
8	43	Norika Harada	Japan	1:10.31	7	1:07.77	8	2:18.08	+40.22
9	47	Shona Brownlee	Great Britain	2:05.52	9	1:18.03	9	3:23.55	+1:45.69
	42	Zhang Haiyuan	China	DNF	—N/a				
	45	Maiju Laurila	Finland	DNF	—N/a				
	48	Sarah Hundert	Liechtenstein	DNF	—N/a				
	41	Barbara van Bergen	Netherlands	DSQ	—N/a				

== See also ==
- Alpine skiing at the 2022 Winter Olympics
