= Alpine skiing at the 2022 Winter Paralympics – Women's giant slalom =

Women's giant slalom at the XIII Paralympic Winter Games
- Paralympic alpine skiing
- Venue: Yanqing National Alpine Skiing Centre
- Dates: 11 March 2022

Women's giant slalom (visually impaired) at the XIII Paralympic Winter Games
- Competitors: 15 from 10 nations

Medalists
1st place, gold medalist(s)		Veronika Aigner; Guide: Elisabeth Aigner	Austria
2nd place, silver medalist(s)		Zhu Daqing; Guide: Yan Hanhan	China
3rd place, bronze medalist(s)		Barbara Aigner; Guide: Klara Sykora	Austria

Women's giant slalom (standing) at the XIII Paralympic Winter Games
- Competitors: 22 from 15 nations

Medalists
1st place, gold medalist(s)		Zhang Mengqiu	China
2nd place, silver medalist(s)		Mollie Jepsen	Canada
3rd place, bronze medalist(s)		Andrea Rothfuss	Germany

Women's giant slalom (sitting) at the XIII Paralympic Winter Games
- Competitors: 13 from 8 nations

Medalists
1st place, gold medalist(s)		Momoka Muraoka	Japan
2nd place, silver medalist(s)		Liu Sitong	China
3rd place, bronze medalist(s)		Zhang Wenjing	China

The Women's giant slalom competition of the 2022 Winter Paralympics was held at the Yanqing National Alpine Skiing Centre on 11 March 2022.

== Medal table ==
Rank	Nation	Gold	Silver	Bronze	Total
1	China (CHN)*	1	2	1	4
2	Austria (AUT)	1	0	1	2
3	Japan (JPN)	1	0	0	1
4	Canada (CAN)	0	1	0	1
5	Germany (GER)	0	0	1	1
Totals (5 entries)		3	3	3	9

== Visually impaired ==
In the giant slalom visually impaired, the athlete with a visual impairment has a sighted guide. The two skiers are considered a team, and dual medals are awarded.

Rank	Bib	Name	Country	Run 1	Rank	Run 2	Rank	Total	Difference
1st place, gold medalist(s)	12	Veronika Aigner; Guide: Elisabeth Aigner	Austria	54.08	1	58.46	1	1:52.54	–
2nd place, silver medalist(s)	11	Zhu Daqing; Guide: Yan Hanhan	China	57.09	2	1:02.76	5	1:59.85	+7.31
3rd place, bronze medalist(s)	3	Barbara Aigner; Guide: Klara Sykora	Austria	58.04	3	1:01.89	2	1:59.93	+7.39
4	5	Elina Stary; Guide: Celine Arthofer	Austria	58.82	4	1:02.13	3	2:00.95	+8.41
5	7	Alexandra Rexová; Guide: Eva Trajčíková	Slovakia	59.76	5	1:02.26	4	2:02.02	+9.48
6	8	Melissa Perrine; Guide: Bobbi Kelly	Australia	1:02.13	6	1:04.88	6	2:07.01	+14.47
7	9	Menna Fitzpatrick; Guide: Gary Smith	Great Britain	1:02.78	7	1:04.89	7	2:07.67	+15.13
8	10	Martina Vozza; Guide: Ylenia Sabidussi	Italy	1:03.20	8	1:05.63	8	2:05.83	+16.29
9	1	Millie Knight; Guide: Brett Wild	Great Britain	1:03.35	9	1:07.98	9	2:11.33	+18.79
10	4	Noemi Ewa Ristau; Guide: Paula Brenzel	Germany	1:03.94	10	1:08.64	11	2:12.58	+20.04
11	13	Sara Choi; Guide: Kim Yoo-seong	South Korea	1:06.71	11	1:08.53	10	2:15.24	+22.70
12	15	Linda Le Bon; Guide: Ulla Gilot	Belgium	1:08.56	12	1:10.07	12	2:18.63	+26.09
13	14	Danelle Umstead; Guide: Rob Umstead	United States	1:15.62	13	1:18.62	2:34.24	13	+41.70
	2	Henrieta Farkašová; Guide: Michal Cerven	Slovakia	DNF	—N/a				
	6	Chiara Mazzel; Guide: Fabrizio Casal	Italy	DNF	—N/a				

== Standing ==
Rank	Bib	Name	Country	Run 1	Rank	Run 2	Rank	Total	Difference
1st place, gold medalist(s)	26	Zhang Mengqiu	China	56.07	1	59.05	1	1:55.12	–
2nd place, silver medalist(s)	17	Mollie Jepsen	Canada	57.90	3	1:03.05	5	2:00.95	+5.83
3rd place, bronze medalist(s)	19	Andrea Rothfuss	Germany	59.28	4	1:02.63	2	2:01.91	+6.79
4	21	Marie Bochet	France	59.80	5	1:02.78	3	2:02.58	+7.46
5	18	Anna-Maria Rieder	Germany	1:00.90	7	1:02.84	4	2:03.74	+8.62
6	20	Michaela Gosselin	Canada	1:01.31	8	1:04.86	6	2:06.17	+11.05
7	29	Ammi Hondo	Japan	1:03.58	10	1:07.49	7	2:11.07	+15.95
8	25	Guo Jiaxin	China	1:06.52	12	1:09.63	9	2:16.15	+21.03
9	31	Lucija Smetiško	Croatia	1:07.34	13	1:09.07	8	2:16.41	+21.29
10	24	Rae Anderson	Australia	1:06.50	11	1:11.05	10	2:17.55	+22.43
11	35	Vanesa Gašková	Slovakia	1:10.24	14	1:13.30	11	2:23.54	+28.42
12	23	Allie Johnson	United States	1:10.37	15	1:15.38	12	2:25.75	+30.63
13	30	Noriko Kamiyama	Japan	1:10.48	16	1:15.74	14	2:26.22	+31.10
14	33	Wang Qingyun	China	1:14.43	17	1:15.60	13	2:30.03	+34.91
15	28	Sheina Vaspi	Israel	1:18.87	19	1:22.31	15	2:41.18	+46.06
16	36	Ilma Kazazić	Bosnia and Herzegovina	1:18.97	20	1:24.43	16	2:43.40	+48.28
	16	Ebba Årsjö	Sweden	56.14	2	DNF	—N/a		
	22	Alana Ramsay	Canada	1:00.78	6	DNF	—N/a		
	27	Petra Smaržová	Slovakia	1:02.31	9	DNF	—N/a		
	37	Claudia Hernández	Chile	1:24.35	21	DNF	—N/a		
	34	Laura Văleanu	Romania	1:15.25	18	DNS	—N/a		
	32	Eva-Maria Joechl	Austria	DNF	—N/a				

== Sitting ==
Rank	Bib	Name	Country	Run 1	Rank	Run 2	Rank	Total	Difference
1st place, gold medalist(s)	38	Momoka Muraoka	Japan	1:01.76	2	1:00.51	1	2:02.27	–
2nd place, silver medalist(s)	39	Liu Sitong	China	1:00.72	1	1:08.83	4	2:09.55	+7.28
3rd place, bronze medalist(s)	43	Zhang Wenjing	China	1:05.21	5	1:05.71	2	2:10.92	+8.65
4	41	Anna-Lena Forster	Germany	1:04.17	4	1:06.81	3	2:10.98	+8.71
5	40	Barbara van Bergen	Netherlands	1:02.15	3	1:09.65	5	2:11.80	+9.53
6	46	Zhang Haiyuan	China	1:06.62	6	1:14.37	6	2:20.99	+18.72
7	48	Han Shasha	China	1:09.88	7	1:15.37	7	2:25.25	+22.98
8	44	Katie Combaluzier	Canada	1:11.57	8	1:16.70	8	2:28.27	+26.00
9	45	Shona Brownlee	Great Britain	1:14.20	9	1:17.88	9	2:32.08	+29.81
10	50	Maiju Laurila	Finland	1:23.25	10	1:27.29	10	2:51.23	+48.96
	42	Yoshiko Tanaka	Japan	DNF	—N/a				
	47	Norika Harada	Japan	DNF	—N/a				
	49	Sarah Hundert	Liechtenstein	DNF	—N/a				

== See also ==
- Alpine skiing at the 2022 Winter Olympics
