= Biathlon at the 2022 Winter Paralympics – Men's 6 kilometres =

Men's 6 kilometres at the XIII Paralympic Winter Games
- Paralympic biathlon
- Dates: 5 March

Men's 6 kilometres (visually impaired) at the XIII Paralympic Winter Games
- Competitors: 13 from 6 nations

Medalists
1st place, gold medalist(s)		Vitaliy Lukyanenko; Guide: Borys Babar	Ukraine
2nd place, silver medalist(s)		Oleksandr Kazik; Guide: Serhii Kucheriavyi	Ukraine
3rd place, bronze medalist(s)		Dmytro Suiarko; Guide: Oleksandr Nikonovych	Ukraine

Men's 6 kilometres (standing) at the XIII Paralympic Winter Games
- Competitors: 16 from 9 nations

Medalists
1st place, gold medalist(s)		Grygorii Vovchynskyi	Ukraine
2nd place, silver medalist(s)		Marco Maier	Germany
3rd place, bronze medalist(s)		Mark Arendz	Canada

Men's 6 kilometres (sitting) at the XIII Paralympic Winter Games
- Competitors: 20 from 8 nations

Medalists
1st place, gold medalist(s)		Zixu Liu	China
2nd place, silver medalist(s)		Taras Rad	Ukraine
3rd place, bronze medalist(s)		Liu Mengtao	China

The Men's 6 kilometres competition of the 2022 Winter Paralympics took place on 5 March 2022.

== Medal table ==
Rank	Nation	Gold	Silver	Bronze	Total
1	Ukraine (UKR)	2	2	1	5
2	China (CHN)	1	0	1	2
3	Germany (GER)	0	1	0	1
4	Canada (CAN)	0	0	1	1
Totals (4 entries)		3	3	3	9

== Visually impaired ==
In the biathlon visually impaired, the athlete with a visual impairment has a sighted guide. The two skiers are considered a team, and dual medals are awarded.

Rank	Bib	Name	Country	Misses	Real time	Calculated Time	Difference
1st place, gold medalist(s)	110	Vitaliy Lukyanenko; Guide: Borys Babar	Ukraine	0	17:05.8	17:05.8	+0.0
2nd place, silver medalist(s)	111	Oleksandr Kazik; Guide: Serhii Kucheriavyi	Ukraine	2	19:55.3	17:31.9	+26.1
3rd place, bronze medalist(s)	109	Dmytro Suiarko; Guide: Oleksandr Nikonovych	Ukraine	1	17:43.9	17:33.3	+27.5
4	108	Yu Shuang; Guide: Wang Guanyu	China	1	18:00.7	17:49.9	+44.1
5	113	Anatolii Kovalevskyi; Guide: Oleksandr Mukshyn	Ukraine	3	18:45.0	18:33.8	+1:28.0
6	112	Iaroslav Reshetynskyi; Guide: K. Yaremenko	Ukraine	2	18:53.0	18:41.7	+1:35.9
7	106	Nico Messinger; Guide: Robin Wunderle	Germany	3	19:16.7	19:05.1	+1:59.3
8	102	Dang Hesong; Guide: Qin H.	China	2	19:19.6	19:08.0	+2:02.2
9	105	Anthony Chalençon; Guide: Brice Ottonello	France	4	21:56.4	19:18.4	+2:12.6
10	107	Zebastian Modin; Guide: Emil Jönsson Haag	Sweden	5	22:17.8	19:37.1	+2:31.3
11	104	Piotr Garbowski; Guide: Jakub Twardowski	Poland	3	21:19.9	21:19.9	+4:14.1
12	103	Paweł Gil; Guide: M. Landa	Poland	2	22:48.5	22:48.5	+5:42.7
13	101	Pawel Nowicki; Guide: J. Kobryn	Poland	5	27:37.4	24:18.5	+7:12.7

== Standing ==
Rank	Bib	Name	Country	Misses	Real time	Calculated Time	Difference
1st place, gold medalist(s)	85	Grygorii Vovchynskyi	Ukraine	0	16:58.3	16:17.6	0.0
2nd place, silver medalist(s)	82	Marco Maier	Germany	0	17:46.0	17:03.4	+45.8
3rd place, bronze medalist(s)	84	Mark Arendz	Canada	2	18:08.0	17:13.6	+56.0
4	86	Benjamin Daviet	France	1	18:37.3	17:19.1	+1:01.5
5	73	Yuan Mingshou	China	0	20:01.3	18:01.2	+1:43.6
6	79	Wu Gaoqun	China	4	19:26.8	18:28.5	+2:10.9
7	83	Nils-Erik Ulset	Norway	2	21:16.5	18:30.6	+2:13.0
8	80	Alexandr Gerlits	Kazakhstan	2	19:39.3	18:40.3	+2:22.7
9	74	Li Taiyun	China	3	19:32.4	18:45.5	+2:27.9
10	75	Wu Junbao	China	4	21:07.2	19:00.5	+2:42.9
11	78	Keiichi Sato	Japan	2	20:03.4	19:15.3	+2:57.7
12	77	Ruslan Reiter	United States	1	20:07.8	19:19.5	+3:01.9
13	71	Liu Xiaobin	China	5	22:20.6	20:06.5	+3:48.9
14	72	Drew Shea	United States	0	21:03.0	20:12.5	+3:54.9
15	76	Serafym Drahun	Ukraine	6	22:28.0	21:34.1	+5:16.5
16	81	Alexander Ehler	Germany	7	23:20.7	22:24.7	+6:07.1

== Sitting ==
Rank	Bib	Name	Country	Misses	Real time	Calculated Time	Difference
1st place, gold medalist(s)	37	Liu Zixu	China	0	18:51.5	18:51.5	0.0
2nd place, silver medalist(s)	40	Taras Rad	Ukraine	1	19:09.0	19:09.0	+17.5
3rd place, bronze medalist(s)	33	Liu Mengtao	China	1	19:33.3	19:33.3	+41.8
4	34	Daniel Cnossen	United States	0	19:54.2	19:54.2	+1:02.7
5	36	Martin Fleig	Germany	1	20:52.7	20:02.6	+1:11.1
6	28	Wang Tao	China	2	20:18.1	20:18.1	+1:26.6
7	30	Collin Cameron	Canada	3	21:15.7	20:24.7	+1:33.2
8	38	Aaron Pike	United States	1	21:16.0	20:25.0	+1:33.5
9	31	Scott Meenagh	Great Britain	3	20:34.7	20:34.7	+1:43.2
10	39	Vasyl Kravchuk	Ukraine	3	22:10.1	20:37.0	+1:45.5
11	26	Maksym Varovyi	Ukraine	2	24:08.2	20:45.5	+1:54.0
12	35	Sin Eui-hyun	South Korea	3	20:46.9	20:46.9	+1:55.4
13	32	Pavlo Bal	Ukraine	2	21:44.7	20:52.5	+2:01.0
14	27	Derek Zaplotinsky	Canada	2	24:26.2	21:15.8	+2:24.3
15	21	Sergey Ussoltsev	Kazakhstan	0	22:00.9	22:00.9	+3:09.4
16	25	Yerbol Khamitov	Kazakhstan	7	22:20.6	22:20.6	+3:29.1
17	24	Callum Deboys	Great Britain	2	22:32.0	22:32.0	+3:40.5
18	23	Zhu Yunfeng	China	7	22:50.7	22:50.7	+3:59.2
19	29	Oleksandr Aleksyk	Ukraine	4	23:15.4	23:15.4	+4:23.9
20	22	Won Yoo-min	South Korea	1	25:11.0	24:10.6	+5:19.1

== See also ==
- Biathlon at the 2022 Winter Olympics
