= Cross-country skiing at the 2022 Winter Paralympics – Men's 12.5 kilometre =

Men's 12.5 kilometre at the XIII Paralympic Winter Games
- Paralympic cross-country skiing
- Dates: 12 March

Men's 12.5 kilometre (visually impaired) at the XIII Paralympic Winter Games
- Competitors: 7 from 5 nations

Medalists
1st place, gold medalist(s)		Brian McKeever; Guide: Graham Nishikawa	Canada
2nd place, silver medalist(s)		Zebastian Modin; Guide: Emil Jönsson Haag, Erik Persson	Sweden
3rd place, bronze medalist(s)		Dmytro Suiarko; Guide: Oleksandr Nikonovych	Ukraine

Men's 12.5 kilometre (standing) at the XIII Paralympic Winter Games

Medalists
1st place, gold medalist(s)		Wang Chenyang	China
2nd place, silver medalist(s)		Benjamin Daviet	France
3rd place, bronze medalist(s)		Cai Jiayun	China

Men's 10 kilometre (sitting) at the XIII Paralympic Winter Games

Medalists
1st place, gold medalist(s)		Mao Zhongwu	China
2nd place, silver medalist(s)		Zheng Peng	China
3rd place, bronze medalist(s)		Giuseppe Romele	Italy

The men's 12.5 kilometre free competition of the 2022 Winter Paralympics was held at the National Biathlon Center in Beijing on 12 March 2022.

== Medal table ==
Rank	Nation	Gold	Silver	Bronze	Total
1	China (CHN)*	2	1	1	4
2	Canada (CAN)	1	0	0	1
3	France (FRA)	0	1	0	1
3	Sweden (SWE)	0	1	0	1
5	Italy (ITA)	0	0	1	1
5	Ukraine (UKR)	0	0	1	1
Totals (6 entries)		3	3	3	9

== 12.5 km free visually impaired ==
In the cross-country skiing visually impaired, the athlete with a visual impairment has a sighted guide. The two skiers are considered a team, and dual medals are awarded.

Rank	Bib	Name	Country	Time	Difference
1st place, gold medalist(s)	16	Brian McKeever; Guide: Graham Nishikawa	Canada	33:06.6	–
2nd place, silver medalist(s)	15	Zebastian Modin; Guide: Emil Jönsson Haag, Erik Persson	Sweden	33:59.1	+52.5
3rd place, bronze medalist(s)	12	Dmytro Suiarko; Guide: Oleksandr Nikonovych	Ukraine	34:08.1	+1:01.5
4	13	Anthony Chalençon; Guide: Alexandre Pouye	France	34:15.5	+1:08.9
5	9	Oleksandr Kazik; Guide: Serhii Kucheriavyi	Ukraine	34:27.4	+1:20.8
6	14	Jake Adicoff; Guide: Sam Wood	United States	34:57.6	+1:51.0
7	11	Anatolii Kovalevskyi; Guide: Oleksandr Mukshyn	Ukraine	35:16.3	+2:09.7
8	4	Dang Hesong; Guide: Qin H.	China	37:03.8	+3:57.2
9	7	Thomas Oxaal; Guide: Ole-Martin Lid	Norway	37:35.6	+4:29.0
10	6	Xu He; Guide: Diao C.	China	37:49.3	+4:42.7
11	10	Piotr Garbowski; Guide: Jakub Twardowski	Poland	38:46.2	+5:39.6
12	8	Inkki Inola; Guide: Jari Huhta	Finland	39:06.4	+5:59.8
13	5	Max Nelson; Guide: S. Hamilton	United States	39:27.3	+6:20.7
14	2	Paweł Gil; Guide: M. Landa	Poland	44:02.1	+10:55.5
15	3	Pawel Nowicki; Guide: J. Kobryn	Poland	44:30.7	+11:24.1
16	1	Ryohei Ariyasu; Guide: Y. Fujita	Japan	45:01.8	+11:55.2

== 12.5 km free standing ==
Rank	Bib	Name	Country	Time	Difference
1st place, gold medalist(s)	28	Wang Chenyang	China	33:07.8	–
2nd place, silver medalist(s)	42	Benjamin Daviet	France	33:09.1	+1.4
3rd place, bronze medalist(s)	26	Cai Jiayun	China	33:18.0	+10.2
4	31	Liu Xiaobin	China	34:40.4	+1:32.6
5	33	Alexandr Gerlits	Kazakhstan	35:11.0	+2:03.2
6	35	Qiu Mingyang	China	36:13.5	+3:05.7
7	41	Mark Arendz	Canada	36:23.5	+3:15.7
8	39	Taiki Kawayoke	Japan	37:23.9	+4:16.1
9	38	Alexander Ehler	Germany	37:34.0	+4:26.2
10	37	Ruslan Reiter	United States	39:06.7	+5:58.9
11	40	Witold Skupien	Poland	39:52.1	+6:44.3
12	25	Keiichi Sato	Japan	39:58.8	+6:51.0
13	36	Luca Tavasci	Switzerland	40:28.5	+7:20.7
14	34	Dashdorj Tsegmid	Mongolia	41:01.0	+7:53.2
15	31	Keigo Iwamoto	Japan	41:18.7	+8:10.9
16	30	Cristian Toninelli	Italy	41:28.5	+8:20.7
17	24	Serafym Drahun	Ukraine	42:58.8	+9:51.0
18	27	Ma Mingtao	China	43:23.4	+10:15.6
19	23	Drew Shea	United States	43:55.9	+10:48.1
20	21	Abdoulfazi Khatibi Mianaei	Iran	44:47.7	+11:39.9
21	32	Batmönkhiin Ganbold	Mongolia	48:07.7	+14:59.9
22	22	Pol Makuri Redolad Garcia	Spain	52:08.5	+19:00.7

== 10 km free sitting ==
Rank	Bib	Name	Country	Time	Difference
1st place, gold medalist(s)	103	Mao Zhongwu	China	29:10.7	–
2nd place, silver medalist(s)	96	Zheng Peng	China	30:08.4	+57.7
3rd place, bronze medalist(s)	114	Giuseppe Romele	Italy	31:42.5	+2:31.8
4	111	Collin Cameron	Canada	31:47.8	+2:37.1
5	92	Du Tian	China	33:19.9	+4:09.2
6	102	Liu Mengtao	China	33:47.5	+4:36.8
7	110	Vasyl Kravchuk	Ukraine	33:48.4	+4:37.7
8	112	Pavlo Bal	Ukraine	34:21.5	+5:10.8
9	104	Yerbol Khamitov	Kazakhstan	34:45.5	+5:34.8
10	109	Eui Hyun Shin	South Korea	34:51.4	+5:40.7
11	100	Oleksandr Aleksyk	Ukraine	34:53.3	+5:42.6
12	108	Aaron Pike	United States	35:45.0	+6:34.3
13	113	Cristian Ribera	Brazil	36:09.5	+6:58.8
14	97	Krzysztof Plewa	Poland	36:13.7	+7:03.0
15	106	Derek Zaplotinsky	Canada	36:14.9	+7:04.2
16	105	Scott Meenagh	Great Britain	36:16.8	+7:06.1
17	107	Maksym Yarovyi	Ukraine	37:03.2	+7:52.5
18	99	Guilherme Rocha	Brazil	37:23.6	+8:12.9
19	91	Ethan Hess	Canada	38:16.1	+9:05.4
20	95	Robelson Lula	Brazil	38:20.3	+9:09.6
21	98	Callum Deboys	Great Britain	38:41.8	+9:31.1
22	88	Sergey Ussoltsev	Kazakhstan	38:52.2	+9:41.5
23	86	Nicolas Lima	Argentina	39:14.1	+10:03.4
24	87	Josh Sweeney	United States	39:41.7	+10:31.0
25	85	Michele Biglione	Italy	40:56.0	+11:45.3
26	90	Denis Petrenko	Kazakhstan	40:57.6	+11:46.9
27	93	Wesley Vinicius dos Santos	Brazil	41:12.5	+12:01.8
28	83	Jaeseok Jeong	South Korea	41:30.4	+12:19.7
29	101	Steve Arnold	Great Britain	43:04.6	+13:53.9
30	89	Hiroaki Mori	Japan	43:07.9	+13:57.2
31	84	Yuriy Berezin	Kazakhstan	44:16.9	+15:06.2
32	94	Steve Thomas	Great Britain	44:17.5	+15:06.8
33	81	Josip Zima	Croatia	52:17.2	+23:06.5
34	82	Temuri Dadiani	Georgia	52:22.4	+23:11.7

== See also ==
- Cross-country skiing at the 2022 Winter Olympics
