= Alpine skiing at the 2022 Winter Paralympics – Women's downhill =

Women's downhill at the XIII Paralympic Winter Games
- Paralympic alpine skiing
- Venue: Yanqing National Alpine Skiing Centre
- Dates: 5 March 2022

Women's downhill (visually impaired) at the XIII Paralympic Winter Games
- Competitors: 8 from 6 nations

Medalists
1st place, gold medalist(s)		Henrieta Farkašová; Guide: Martin Motyka	Slovakia
2nd place, silver medalist(s)		Zhu Daqing; Guide: Yan Hanhan	China
3rd place, bronze medalist(s)		Millie Knight; Guide: Brett Wild	Great Britain

Women's downhill (standing) at the XIII Paralympic Winter Games
- Competitors: 9 from 6 nations

Medalists
1st place, gold medalist(s)		Mollie Jepsen	Canada
2nd place, silver medalist(s)		Zhang Mengqiu	China
3rd place, bronze medalist(s)		Ebba Årsjö	Sweden

Women's downhill (sitting) at the XIII Paralympic Winter Games
- Competitors: 7 from 6 nations

Medalists
1st place, gold medalist(s)		Momoka Muraoka	Japan
2nd place, silver medalist(s)		Anna-Lena Forster	Germany
3rd place, bronze medalist(s)		Liu Sitong	China

The Women's downhill competition of the 2022 Winter Paralympics was held at the Yanqing National Alpine Skiing Centre on 5 March 2022.

== Medal table ==
Rank	Nation	Gold	Silver	Bronze	Total
1	Canada (CAN)	1	0	0	1
1	Japan (JPN)	1	0	0	1
1	Slovakia (SVK)	1	0	0	1
4	China (CHN)*	0	2	1	3
5	Germany (GER)	0	1	0	1
6	Great Britain (GBR)	0	0	1	1
6	Sweden (SWE)	0	0	1	1
Totals (7 entries)		3	3	3	9

== Visually impaired ==
In the downhill visually impaired, the athlete with a visual impairment has a sighted guide. The two skiers are considered a team, and dual medals are awarded.

Rank	Bib	Name	Country	Time	Difference	Class	Factor
1st place, gold medalist(s)	1	Henrieta Farkašová; Guide: Martin Motyka	Slovakia	1:19.50	–	B3	91.42%
2nd place, silver medalist(s)	7	Zhu Daqing; Guide: Yan Hanhan	China	1:21.75	+2.25	B2	87.09%
3rd place, bronze medalist(s)	2	Millie Knight; Guide: Brett Wild	Great Britain	1:23.20	+3.70	B2	87.09%
4	3	Alexandra Rexová; Guide: Martin Makovník	Slovakia	1:25.13	+5.63	B2	87.09%
5	5	Menna Fitzpatrick; Guide: Gary Smith	Great Britain	1:30.49	+10.99	B2	87.09%
6	4	Linda Le Bon; Guide: Ulla Gilot	Belgium	1:36.06	+16.56	B2	87.09%
-	6	Noemi Ewa Ristau; Guide: Paula Brenzel	Germany	DNF		B2	87.09%
-	8	Martina Vozza; Guide: Ylenia Sabidussi	Italy	DNF		B2	87.09%

== Standing ==
Rank	Bib	Name	Country	Time	Difference	Class	Factor
1st place, gold medalist(s)	11	Mollie Jepsen	Canada	1:21.75	–	LW6/8-2	100%
2nd place, silver medalist(s)	17	Zhang Mengqiu	China	1.21.85	+0.10	LW9-1	88.92%
3rd place, bronze medalist(s)	15	Ebba Årsjö	Sweden	1.23.20	+1.45	LW4	98.52%
4	10	Andrea Rothfuss	Germany	1:23.71	+1.96	LW6/8-2	100%
5	14	Michaela Gosselin	Canada	1:25.75	+4.00	LW6/8-1	98.34%
6	13	Ammi Hondo	Japan	1:25.90	+4.15	LW6/8-2	100%
7	12	Alana Ramsay	Canada	1:26.08	+4.33	LW9-2	94.83%
8	16	Noriko Kamiyama	Japan	1:38.49	+16.74	LW9-2	94.83%
	9	Marie Bochet	France	DNF		LW6/8-2	100%

== Sitting ==
Rank	Bib	Name	Country	Time	Difference	Class	Factor
1st place, gold medalist(s)	19	Momoka Muraoka	Japan	1:29.77	–	LW10-2	85.86%
2nd place, silver medalist(s)	18	Anna-Lena Forster	Germany	1.30.59	+0.82	LW12-1	87.66%
3rd place, bronze medalist(s)	23	Liu Sitong	China	1.32.10	+2.33	LW12-2	87.74%
	20	Barbara van Bergen	Netherlands	DNF		LW11	86.58%
	21	Laurie Stephens	United States	DNF		LW12-1	87.66%
	22	Katie Combaluzier	Canada	DNF		LW12-1	87.66%
	24	Zhang Haiyuan	China	DNF		LW12-1	87.66%

== See also ==
- Alpine skiing at the 2022 Winter Olympics
