= Germany at the 2022 Winter Paralympics =

- Flag of Germany
- IPC code: GER
- NPC: National Paralympic Committee Germany
- Website: www.dbs-npc.de

in Beijing, China 4 March 2022 – 13 March 2022
- Competitors: 17 (9 men and 8 women) in 4 sports
- Flag bearers (opening): Martin Fleig; Anna-Lena Forster
- Flag bearers (closing): Leonie Maria Walter; Pirmin Strecker
- Medals Ranked 7th: Gold 4 Silver 8 Bronze 7 Total 19

Winter Paralympics appearances (overview)
- 1976; 1980; 1984; 1988; 1992; 1994; 1998; 2002; 2006; 2010; 2014; 2018; 2022; 2026

Germany competed at the 2022 Winter Paralympics in Beijing, China which took place between 4–13 March 2022.

== Medalists ==
The following German competitors won medals at the games. In the discipline sections below, the medalists' names are bolded.

Medals by sport
Sport	1st place, gold medalist(s)	2nd place, silver medalist(s)	3rd place, bronze medalist(s)	Total
Alpine skiing	2	2	2	**6**
Biathlon	1	4	3	**8**
Cross-country skiing	1	2	2	**5**
Total	4	8	7	19

Medals by date
Day	Date	1st place, gold medalist(s)	2nd place, silver medalist(s)	3rd place, bronze medalist(s)	Total
Day 1	5 March	0	3	1	4
Day 2	6 March	0	1	0	1
Day 3	7 March	1	1	1	3
Day 4	8 March	1	1	1	3
Day 5	9 March	0	1	1	2
Day 6	10 March	0	0	0	0
Day 7	11 March	0	1	2	3
Day 8	12 March	2	0	1	3
Day 9	13 March	0	0	0	0
Total		4	8	7	19

Medals by gender
Gender	1st place, gold medalist(s)	2nd place, silver medalist(s)	3rd place, bronze medalist(s)	Total
Male	0	3	0	**3**
Female	4	5	7	**16**
Mixed	0	0	0	**0**
Total	4	8	7	19

Multiple medalists
Name	Sport	1st place, gold medalist(s)	2nd place, silver medalist(s)	3rd place, bronze medalist(s)	Total
Anna-Lena Forster	Alpine skiing	2	2	0	**4**
Linn Kazmaier; Guide: Florian Baumann	Biathlon; Cross-country skiing	1	3	1	**5**
Marco Maier	Biathlon; Cross-country skiing	0	2	0	**2**
Leonie Maria Walter; Guide: Pirmin Strecker	Biathlon; Cross-country skiing	1	0	3	**4**

Medal	Name	Sport	Event	Date
Gold	Anna-Lena Forster	Alpine skiing	Women's super combined, sitting	7 March
Gold	Leonie Maria Walter; Guide: Pirmin Strecker	Biathlon	Women's 10km, visually impaired	8 March
Gold	Anna-Lena Forster	Alpine skiing	Women's slalom, sitting	12 March
Gold	Linn Kazmaier; Guide: Florian Baumann	Cross-country skiing	Women's 10 km, visually impaired	12 March
Silver	Anna-Lena Forster	Alpine skiing	Women's downhill, sitting	5 March
Silver	Marco Maier	Biathlon	Men's 6km, standing	5 March
Silver	Linn Kazmaier; Guide: Florian Baumann	Biathlon	Women's 6km, visually impaired	5 March
Silver	Anna-Lena Forster	Alpine skiing	Women's super-G, sitting	6 March
Silver	Linn Kazmaier; Guide: Florian Baumann	Cross-country skiing	Women's 15km classical, visually impaired	7 March
Silver	Martin Fleig	Biathlon	Men's 10km, sitting	8 March
Silver	Marco Maier	Cross-country skiing	Men's 1.5km sprint, standing	9 March
Silver	Linn Kazmaier; Guide: Florian Baumann	Biathlon	Women's 12.5km, visually impaired	11 March
Bronze	Leonie Maria Walter; Guide: Pirmin Strecker	Biathlon	Women's 6km, visually impaired	5 March
Bronze	Leonie Maria Walter; Guide: Pirmin Strecker	Cross-country skiing	Women's 15km classical, visually impaired	7 March
Bronze	Anja Wicker	Biathlon	Women's 10km, sitting	8 March
Bronze	Linn Kazmaier; Guide: Florian Baumann	Cross-country skiing	Women's 1.5km sprint, visually impaired	9 March
Bronze	Andrea Rothfuss	Alpine skiing	Women's giant slalom, standing	11 March
Bronze	Leonie Maria Walter; Guide: Pirmin Strecker	Biathlon	Women's 12.5km, visually impaired	11 March
Bronze	Anna-Maria Rieder	Alpine skiing	Women's slalom, standing	12 March

== Competitors ==
The following is the list of number of competitors participating at the Games per sport/discipline.

Sport	Men	Women	Total
Alpine skiing	2	4	6
Biathlon	4	4	8
Cross-country skiing	4	4	8
Snowboarding	3	0	3
Total	9	8	17

== Alpine skiing ==
Germany competed in alpine skiing.

Men

Athlete	Class	Event	Run 1		Run 2		Total	
Athlete	Class	Event	Time	Rank	Time	Rank	Time	Rank
Christoph Glötzner	LW2	Giant slalom, standing	DNS					
Christoph Glötzner	LW2	Slalom, standing	DSQ		—N/a			
Leander Kress	LW2	Downhill, standing	—N/a				DNF	
Leander Kress	LW2	Super-G, standing	—N/a				1:18.32	27
Leander Kress	LW2	Super combined, standing	1:16.29	18	46.52	19	2:02.81	17
Leander Kress	LW2	Giant slalom, standing	1:06.22	24	1:03.21	22	2:09.43	22
Leander Kress	LW2	Slalom, standing	56.78	34	DNF		—N/a	

Women

Athlete	Class	Event	Run 1		Run 2		Total	
Athlete	Class	Event	Time	Rank	Time	Rank	Time	Rank
Anna-Lena Forster	LW12-1	Downhill, sitting	—N/a				1:30.59	2nd place, silver medalist(s)
Anna-Lena Forster	LW12-1	Super-G, sitting	—N/a				1:23.84	2nd place, silver medalist(s)
Anna-Lena Forster	LW12-1	Super combined, sitting	1:26.44	4	44.93	1	2:11.37	1st place, gold medalist(s)
Anna-Lena Forster	LW12-1	Giant slalom, sitting	1:04.17	4	1:06.81	3	2:10.98	4
Anna-Lena Forster	LW12-1	Slalom, sitting	48.50	1	49.36	2	1:37.86	1st place, gold medalist(s)
Anna-Maria Rieder	LW9-1	Super-G, standing	—N/a				1:18.63	5
Anna-Maria Rieder	LW9-1	Super combined, standing	1:21.49	6	46.51	3	2:08.00	4
Anna-Maria Rieder	LW9-1	Giant slalom, standing	1:00.90	7	1:02.84	4	2:03.74	5
Anna-Maria Rieder	LW9-1	Slalom, standing	48.97	3	51.53	3	1:40.50	3rd place, bronze medalist(s)
Noemi Ewa Ristau; Guide: Paula Brenzel	B2	Downhill, visually impaired	—N/a				DNF	
Noemi Ewa Ristau; Guide: Paula Brenzel	B2	Super-G, visually impaired	—N/a				1:22.31	5
Noemi Ewa Ristau; Guide: Paula Brenzel	B2	Super combined, visually impaired	DSQ		—N/a			
Noemi Ewa Ristau; Guide: Paula Brenzel	B2	Giant slalom, visually impaired	1:03.94	10	1:08.64	11	2:12.58	10
Noemi Ewa Ristau; Guide: Paula Brenzel	B2	Slalom, visually impaired	51.69	11	50.65	7	1:42.34	9
Andrea Rothfuss	LW6/8-2	Downhill, standing	—N/a				1:23.71	4
Andrea Rothfuss	LW6/8-2	Super-G, standing	—N/a				1:22.35	9
Andrea Rothfuss	LW6/8-2	Super combined, standing	DSQ		—N/a			
Andrea Rothfuss	LW6/8-2	Giant slalom, standing	59.28	4	1:02.63	2	2:01.91	3rd place, bronze medalist(s)
Andrea Rothfuss	LW6/8-2	Slalom, standing	DNF		—N/a			

== Biathlon ==
Germany competed in biathlon.

Men

Athlete	Class	Event	Missed shots	Time	Rank
Alexander Ehler	LW4	6km, standing	7	22:24.7	16
Martin Fleig	LW11.5	6km, sitting	1	20:02.6	5
Martin Fleig	LW11.5	10km, sitting	2	31:23.7	2nd place, silver medalist(s)
Martin Fleig	LW11.5	12.5km, sitting	8	48:51.6	16
Marco Maier	LW8	6km, standing	0	17:03.4	2nd place, silver medalist(s)
Nico Messinger; Guide: Robin Wunderle	B2	6km, visually impaired	3	19:05.1	7
Nico Messinger; Guide: Robin Wunderle	B2	10km, visually impaired	3	39:27.1	7

Women

Athlete	Class	Event	Missed shots	Time	Rank
Linn Kazmaier; Guide: Florian Baumann	B3	6km, visually impaired	1	20:14.6	2nd place, silver medalist(s)
Linn Kazmaier; Guide: Florian Baumann	B3	12.5km, visually impaired	0	50:23.2	2nd place, silver medalist(s)
Johanna Recktenwald; Guide: Valentin Haag	B2	6km, visually impaired	2	24:35.6	7
Johanna Recktenwald; Guide: Valentin Haag	B2	10km, visually impaired	3	45:56.6	4
Johanna Recktenwald; Guide: Valentin Haag	B2	12.5km, visually impaired	4	57:00.8	4
Leonie Maria Walter; Guide: Pirmin Strecker	B2	6km, visually impaired	1	20:39.0	3rd place, bronze medalist(s)
Leonie Maria Walter; Guide: Pirmin Strecker	B2	10km, visually impaired	0	40:56.2	1st place, gold medalist(s)
Leonie Maria Walter; Guide: Pirmin Strecker	B2	12.5km, visually impaired	0	52:27.6	3rd place, bronze medalist(s)
Anja Wicker	LW10.5	6km, sitting	3	23:17.5	5
Anja Wicker	LW10.5	10km, sitting	5	35:45.3	3rd place, bronze medalist(s)
Anja Wicker	LW10.5	12.5km, sitting	0	44:43.3	4

== Cross-country skiing ==
Germany competed in cross-country skiing.

Men

Athlete	Class	Event	Qualification		Semifinal		Final	
Athlete	Class	Event	Time	Rank	Time	Rank	Time	Rank
Alexander Ehler	LW4	20km classical, standing	—N/a				DNF	
Alexander Ehler	LW4	1.5km sprint, standing	2:56.15	11 Q	3:38.7	5	did not advance	
Alexander Ehler	LW4	12.5km free, standing	—N/a				37:34.0	9
Martin Fleig	LW11.5	15km, sitting	—N/a				49:53.9	9
Marco Maier	LW8	1.5km sprint, standing	2:43.67	1 Q	3:26.4	3 Q	3:08.8	2nd place, silver medalist(s)
Nico Messinger; Guide: Robin Wunderle	B2	1.5km sprint, visually impaired	2:49.59	9	did not advance			

Women

Athlete	Class	Event	Qualification		Semifinal		Final	
Athlete	Class	Event	Time	Rank	Time	Rank	Time	Rank
Linn Kazmaier; Guide: Florian Baumann	B3	15km classical, visually impaired	—N/a				52:05.6	2nd place, silver medalist(s)
Linn Kazmaier; Guide: Florian Baumann	B3	1.5km sprint, visually impaired	3:25.09	2 Q	3:57.6	1 Q	4:05.2	3rd place, bronze medalist(s)
Linn Kazmaier; Guide: Florian Baumann	B3	10km free, visually impaired	—N/a				41:40.8	1st place, gold medalist(s)
Johanna Recktenwald; Guide: Valentin Haag	B2	1.5km sprint, visually impaired	3:36.66	5 Q	4:12.2	3	did not advance	
Johanna Recktenwald; Guide: Valentin Haag	B2	10km free, visually impaired	—N/a				46:14.4	5
Leonie Maria Walter; Guide: Pirmin Strecker	B2	15km classical, visually impaired	—N/a				54:08.8	3rd place, bronze medalist(s)
Leonie Maria Walter; Guide: Pirmin Strecker	B2	1.5km sprint, visually impaired	3:35.34	4 Q	4:09.0	2 Q	4:18.4	4
Anja Wicker	LW10.5	1.5km sprint, sitting	2:52.27	6 Q	3:55.2	6	did not advance	

Relay

Athletes	Event	Time	Rank
Anja Wicker; Leonie Maria Walter; Guide: Pirmin Strecker; Marco Maier; Nico Messinger; Guide: Robin Wunderle	4 × 2.5km mixed relay	27:50.1	5
Martin Fleig; Linn Kazmaier; Guide: Florian Baumann; Alexander Ehler; Johanna Recktenwald; Guide: Valentin Haag	4 × 2.5km open relay	31:40.1	8

== Snowboarding ==
Germany competed in snowboarding.

Slalom
Men

Athlete	Event	Run 1	Run 2	Best	Rank
Matthias Keller	Banked slalom, SB-LL2	1:20.16	1:19.07	1:19.07	21
Manuel Ness	Banked slalom, SB-LL2	1:19.73	1:19.15	1:19.15	22
Christian Schmiedt	Banked slalom, SB-LL1	1:20.36	1:24.87	1:20.36	11

Snowboard cross
Men

Athlete	Event	Seeding						Quarterfinal	Semifinal	Final	
Athlete	Event	Run 1		Run 2		Best	Seed	Quarterfinal	Semifinal	Final	
Athlete	Event	Time	Rank	Time	Rank	Best	Seed	Position	Position	Position	Rank
Matthias Keller	Snowboard cross, SB-LL2	1:08.98	16	1:09.67	19	1:08.98	19	did not advance			
Manuel Ness	Snowboard cross, SB-LL2	1:19.33	20	1:18.83	21	1:18.83	22	did not advance			
Christian Schmiedt	Snowboard cross, SB-LL1	1:27.44	14	1:11.36	9	1:11.36	11 Q	3	did not advance		

Qualification legend: Q - Qualify to next round; FA - Qualify to medal final; FB - Qualify to consolation final

== See also ==
- Germany at the Paralympics
- Germany at the 2022 Winter Olympics
