= Zhai Yuxin =

Chinese Paralympic Nordic skier (born 2000)

Personal information
- Born: 11 November 2000 (age 25) Hebei, China

Sport
- Country: China
- Sport: Paralympic Nordic skiing
- Disability class: LW12

Achievements and titles
- Paralympic finals: Beijing 2022, Milan/Cortina 2026
Medal record
Representing China
Women's para biathlon
World Para Biathlon Championships
Silver medal – second place	2025 Pokljuka	Sprint pursuit sitting

Zhai Yuxin (born 11 November 2000) is a Chinese para biathlete and para cross-country skier. She represented China at the 2022 and 2026 Winter Paralympics.

== Career ==
Zhai represented China at the 2022 Winter Paralympics in Beijing. In para biathlon she finished fifth in the middle distance sitting event and sixth in both the individual sitting and sprint sitting races. She also competed in para cross-country skiing, placing ninth in the middle distance sitting event.

In February 2025, she competed at the World Para Biathlon Championships in Pokljuka, and won a silver medal in the women's sprint pursuit sitting event. She also finished fourth in the individual sitting and fifth in the sprint sitting races. She then competed at the 2025 World Para Nordic Skiing Championships in Toblach and competed in cross-country skiing events. She finished fifth in the 10 km interval start sitting classic race. During the 20 km interval start sitting free event she was disqualified after initially finishing third due to taking an incorrect course.

In February 2026, she was selected to represent China at the 2026 Winter Paralympics. Her results included fifth place finishes in the women's individual sitting and sprint sitting para-biathlon events and sixth place in the women's 10 km interval start sitting cross-country skiing race.

== Results ==
=== Paralympic Games ===
Year	Venue	Sport	Results
2022	China Beijing	Biathlon	5th Middle distance Sitting; 6th Individual Sitting; 6th Sprint Sitting
2022	China Beijing	Cross-country skiing	9th Middle distance Sitting
2026	Italy Milan/Cortina d'Ampezzo	Biathlon	5th Individual Sitting; 5th Sprint Sitting
2026	Italy Milan/Cortina d'Ampezzo	Cross-country skiing	6th 10 km interval start Sitting

=== World Championships ===
Year	Venue	Sport	Results
2025	Slovenia Pokljuka	Biathlon	2nd Sprint pursuit Sitting; 4th Individual Sitting; 5th Sprint Sitting
2025	Italy Toblach	Cross-country skiing	5th 10 km interval start Sitting classic DSQ 20 km interval start Sitting free
