= Shona Brownlee =

British skier and RAF Aircraftwoman

Shona Brownlee MBE
Personal information
- Born: 1979 (age 46–47) Livingston, West Lothian, Scotland
- Education: Royal Birmingham Conservatoire; Arizona State University

Sport
- Sport: Alpine skiing

Achievements and titles
- Paralympic finals: 2022
- World finals: 2021
Medal record
Representing Great Britain
Alpine skiing
World Para Snow Sports Championships
Silver medal – second place	2021 Lillehammer	Super-G
Bronze medal – third place	2021 Lillehammer	Giant slalom

Shona Brownlee MBE (born 1979) is a British skier and Royal Air Force Corporal. She won two medals at the 2021 World Para Snow Sports Championships, and competed at the 2022 Winter Paralympics.

== Early life ==
Brownlee is from Livingston, West Lothian, Scotland. She attended Carmondean Primary School and Deans Community High School. She has a bachelor's degree in music from Royal Birmingham Conservatoire and a master's degree from Arizona State University.

== RAF career ==
Bronwlee joined the Royal Air Force in 2012. That year, she injured her ankle in training, which later developed into complex regional pain syndrome. In 2018, she had a leg amputation.

Brownlee has been a member of the Central Band of the Royal Air Force; she plays the French horn and piano. Prior to her amputation, she was unable to be part of the marching band due to her injury.

== Sports career ==
Brownlee started skiing in Bavaria, Germany in 2018. She later became part of the Armed Forces Para Snowsport Team, and in 2019, she raised £50,000 for charity through the organisation.

Brownlee was added to the GB Snowsport squad for the 2021–22 season. As of 2021, she had won 25 medals in Europa and North American Cup, including 11 gold medals, and she was the British champion in all alpine skiing sitting category event. As of December 2021, she was also the highest ranked British skier, and the ninth best in the world. At the 2021 World Para Snow Sports Championships in Lillehammer, Norway, Brownlee came second in the women's super-G event, and third in the giant slalom event. She was the first Briton to win a medal at the championships. In the same year, she competed at the British Para-Triathlon Championships, winning a silver medal.

In February 2022, Brownlee was confirmed in the British team for the 2022 Winter Paralympics. It was her first Paralympic Games, and she was one of 14 Scottish athletes competing. Brownlee came sixth in the super-G sitting event. Sitting in 5th place after the super-G, she did not finish the slalom run of the super combined sitting event, and came ninth in both the giant slalom sitting and slalom sitting events.

== Honours ==
In November 2021, Brownlee was named the RAF Sportswoman of the Year. She was made an MBE in the 2022 New Year Honours.
