= Biathlon at the 2022 Winter Paralympics – Men's 12.5 kilometres =

Men's 12.5 kilometres at the XIII Paralympic Winter Games
- Paralympic biathlon
- Dates: 11 March

Men's 12.5 kilometres (visually impaired) at the XIII Paralympic Winter Games

Medalists
1st place, gold medalist(s)		Oleksandr Kazik; Guide: Serhii Kucheriavyi	Ukraine
2nd place, silver medalist(s)		Vitaliy Lukyanenko; Guide: Borys Babar	Ukraine
3rd place, bronze medalist(s)		Yu Shuang; Guide: Wang Guanyu	China

Men's 12.5 kilometres (standing) at the XIII Paralympic Winter Games
- Competitors: 10 from 7 nations

Medalists
1st place, gold medalist(s)		Benjamin Daviet	France
2nd place, silver medalist(s)		Mark Arendz	Canada
3rd place, bronze medalist(s)		Grygorii Vovchynskyi	Ukraine

Men's 12.5 kilometres (sitting) at the XIII Paralympic Winter Games
- Competitors: 20 from 8 nations

Medalists
1st place, gold medalist(s)		Liu Mengtao	China
2nd place, silver medalist(s)		Taras Rad	Ukraine
3rd place, bronze medalist(s)		Liu Zixu	China

The Men's 12.5 kilometres competition of the 2022 Winter Paralympics took place on 11 March 2022.

== Medal table ==
Rank	Nation	Gold	Silver	Bronze	Total
1	Ukraine (UKR)	1	2	1	4
2	China (CHN)*	1	0	2	3
3	France (FRA)	1	0	0	1
4	Canada (CAN)	0	1	0	1
Totals (4 entries)		3	3	3	9

== Visually impaired ==
In the biathlon visually impaired, the athlete with a visual impairment has a sighted guide. The two skiers are considered a team, and dual medals are awarded.

Rank	Bib	Name	Country	Penalties	Real Time	Calculated Time	Difference
1st place, gold medalist(s)	105	Oleksandr Kazik; Guide: Serhii Kucheriavyi	Ukraine	2	46:53.7	43:16.1	–
2nd place, silver medalist(s)	104	Vitaliy Lukyanenko; Guide: Borys Babar	Ukraine	2	42:44.3	44:44.3	+1:28.2
3rd place, bronze medalist(s)	103	Yu Shuang; Guide: Wang Guanyu	China	4	43:01.1	46:35.3	+3:19.2
4	106	Iaroslav Reshetynskyi; Guide: Konstiantyn Yaremenko	Ukraine	4	43:21.4	46:55.4	+3:39.3
5	107	Anatolii Kovalevskyi; Guide: Oleksandr Mukshyn	Ukraine	6	41:51.8	47:26.7	+4:10.6
6	101	Dang Hesong; Guide: Qin Haiyang	China	5	46:05.5	50:37.8	+7:21.7
7	102	Paweł Gil; Guide: Michal Landa	Poland	5	52:22.6	57:22.6	+14:06.5

== Standing ==
Rank	Bib	Name	Country	Penalties	Real Time	Calculated Time	Difference
1st place, gold medalist(s)	80	Benjamin Daviet	France	0	40:50.4	37:58.9	–
2nd place, silver medalist(s)	78	Mark Arendz	Canada	1	41:16.8	40:13.0	+2:14.1
3rd place, bronze medalist(s)	79	Grygorii Vovchynskyi	Ukraine	1	43:09.6	42:26.0	+4:27.1
4	75	Wu Gaoqun	China	3	41:58.8	42:52.9	+4:54.0
5	76	Alexandr Gerlits	Kazakhstan	2	43:28.0	43:17.6	+5:18.7
6	72	Li Taiyun	China	1	46:00.3	45:09.9	+7:11.0
7	74	Sato Keiichi	Japan	1	46:06.4	45:15.7	+7:16.8
8	77	Nils-Erik Ulset	Norway	2	49:53.5	45.24.3	+7:25.4
9	71	Yuan Mingshou	China	2	49:47.8	46:49.0	+8:50.1
10	73	Wu Junbao	China	5	49:28.5	49:31.7	+11:32.8

== Sitting ==
Rank	Bib	Name	Country	Penalties	Real Time	Calculated Time	Difference
1st place, gold medalist(s)	33	Liu Mengtao	China	0	38:29.4	38:29.4	–
2nd place, silver medalist(s)	40	Taras Rad	Ukraine	0	39:13.9	39:13.9	+44.5
3rd place, bronze medalist(s)	37	Liu Zixu	China	1	38:27.5	39:27.5	+58.1
4	30	Collin Cameron	Canada	1	41:14.6	40.35.6	+2:06.2
5	28	Wang Tao	China	1	40:03.8	41.03.8	+2:34.4
6	31	Scott Meenagh	Great Britain	1	40:32.5	41.32.5	+3:03.1
7	34	Daniel Cnossen	United States	1	41:46.9	42.46.9	+4:17.5
8	35	Sin Eui-hyun	South Korea	2	40:50.6	42.50.6	+4:21.2
9	38	Aaron Pike	United States	2	43:02.3	43.19.0	+4:49.6
10	27	Derek Zaplotinsky	Canada	1	49:08.5	43.45.2	+5:15.8
11	39	Vasyl Kravchuk	Ukraine	2	45:37.7	44.26.1	+5:56.7
12	32	Pavlo Bal	Ukraine	5	42:27.2	45.45.3	+7:15.9
13	29	Oleksandr Aleksyk	Ukraine	3	43:04.6	46.04.6	+7:35.2
14	23	Zhu Yunfeng	China	3	43:24.4	46.24.4	+7:55.0
15	21	Sergey Ussoltsev	Kazakhstan	1	46:51.2	47.51.2	+9:11.8
16	36	Martin Fleig	Kazakhstan	8	42:33.8	48.51.6	+10:12.2
17	25	Maksym Yarovyi	Ukraine	5	52:01.4	49.44.4	+11:04.0
18	24	Callum Deboys	Great Britain	5	44:53.8	49.53.8	+11:13.4
19	22	Won Yoo-min	South Korea	0	52:11.8	52.11.8	+13:31.4
	26	Steve Arnold	Great Britain	DNS			

== See also ==
- Biathlon at the 2022 Winter Olympics
