= France at the 2022 Winter Paralympics =

- Flag of France
- IPC code: FRA
- NPC: French Paralympic and Sports Committee
- Website: france-paralympique.fr

in Beijing, China 4 March 2022 – 13 March 2022
- Competitors: 15 (13 men and 2 women) in 4 sports
- Flag bearer: Benjamin Daviet
- Medals Ranked 4th: Gold 7 Silver 3 Bronze 2 Total 12

Winter Paralympics appearances (overview)
- 1976; 1980; 1984; 1988; 1992; 1994; 1998; 2002; 2006; 2010; 2014; 2018; 2022; 2026

France competed at the 2022 Winter Paralympics in Beijing, China which took place between 4–13 March 2022. In total, 15 athletes competed in four sports.

== Medalists ==
The following French competitors won medals at the games. In the discipline sections below, the medalists' names are bolded.

Medal	Name	Sport	Event	Date
Gold	Arthur Bauchet	Alpine skiing	Men's slalom, standing	13 March
Gold	Benjamin Daviet	Biathlon	Men's 12.5 kilometers, standing	11 March
Gold	Maxime Montaggioni	Snowboarding	Men's banked slalom SB-UL	11 March
Gold	Benjamin Daviet	Cross-country skiing	Men's 1.5 km sprint, standing	9 March
Gold	Arthur Bauchet	Alpine skiing	Men's super combined, standing	7 March
Gold	Cécile Hernandez	Snowboarding	Women's snowboard cross SB-LL2	7 March
Gold	Arthur Bauchet	Alpine skiing	Men's downhill, standing	5 March
Silver	Benjamin Daviet; Anthony Chalençon; Guide: Alexandre Pouye; Guide: Brice Ottonello	Cross-country skiing	Open 4 × 2.5 kilometre relay	13 March
Silver	Benjamin Daviet	Cross-country skiing	Men's 12.5 km, standing	12 March
Silver	Marie Bochet	Alpine skiing	Women's super-G, standing	6 March
Bronze	Arthur Bauchet	Alpine skiing	Men's giant slalom, standing	10 March
Bronze	Hyacinthe Deleplace; Guide: Valentin Giraud Moine	Alpine skiing	Men's downhill, visually impaired	5 March

**Medals by sport**
**Sport**	1st place, gold medalist(s)	2nd place, silver medalist(s)	3rd place, bronze medalist(s)	**Total**
Alpine skiing	3	1	2	**6**
Cross-country skiing	1	2	0	**3**
Snowboarding	2	0	0	**2**
Biathlon	1	0	0	**1**
**Total**	**7**	**3**	**2**	**12**

**Medals by gender**
**Gender**	1st place, gold medalist(s)	2nd place, silver medalist(s)	3rd place, bronze medalist(s)	**Total**
Male	6	1	2	**9**
Female	1	1	0	**2**
Mixed	0	1	0	**1**
**Total**	**7**	**3**	**2**	**12**

**Medals by day**
**Day**	1st place, gold medalist(s)	2nd place, silver medalist(s)	3rd place, bronze medalist(s)	Total
5 March	1	0	1	2
6 March	0	1	0	1
7 March	2	0	0	2
8 March	0	0	0	0
9 March	1	0	0	1
10 March	0	0	1	1
11 March	2	0	0	2
12 March	0	1	0	1
13 March	1	1	0	2
**Total**	**7**	**3**	**2**	**12**

== Administration ==
The flagbearers of France at ceremonies of the 2022 Winter Paralympics were selected by athletes and not by the French Paralympic and Sports Committee (CPSF).

== Competitors ==
The following is the list of number of competitors participating at the Games per sport/discipline.

Sport	Men	Women	Total
Alpine skiing	8	1	9
Biathlon	2	0	2
Cross-country skiing	2	0	2
Snowboarding	3	1	4
Total	13	2	15

== Alpine skiing ==
Marie Bochet is among the alpine skiers.

Men

Athlete	Event	Run 1		Run 2		Total	
Athlete	Event	Time	Rank	Time	Rank	Time	Rank
Hyacinthe Deleplace; Guide: Valentin Giraud Moine	Downhill, visually impaired	—N/a				1:14.10	3rd place, bronze medalist(s)
Arthur Bauchet	Downhill, standing	—N/a				1:14.92	1st place, gold medalist(s)
Manoel Bourdenx	Downhill, standing	—N/a				1:18.49	7
Jordan Broisin	Downhill, standing	—N/a				1:20.18	13
Oscar Burnham	Downhill, standing	—N/a				1:21.07	18
Hyacinthe Deleplace; Guide: Maxime Jourdan	Giant slalom, visually impaired	58.47	4	DNF			
Arthur Bauchet	Giant slalom, standing	59.19	6	56.70	1	1:55.89	3rd place, bronze medalist(s)
Manoel Bourdenx	Giant slalom, standing	1:01.64	13	59.12	9	2:00.76	13
Jordan Broisin	Giant slalom, standing	1:00.00	8	59.95	13	1:59.95	12
Oscar Burnham	Giant slalom, standing	1:00.11	10	58.34	6	1:58.45	7
Jules Segers	Giant slalom, standing	1:03.91	19	1:01.55	16	2:05.46	16
Lou Braz-Dagand	Giant slalom, sitting	1:04.11	7	1:03.66	12	2:07.77	9
Hyacinthe Deleplace; Guide: Maxime Jourdan	Slalom, visually impaired	45.07	4	52.08	5	1:37.15	4
Arthur Bauchet	Slalom, standing	40.38	1	49.23	2	1:29.61	1st place, gold medalist(s)
Manoel Bourdenx	Slalom, standing	50.11	24	1:00.80	22	1:50.91	20
Jordan Broisin	Slalom, standing	46.24	10	54.46	9	1:40.70	7
Oscar Burnham	Slalom, standing	51.92	31	54.38	8	1:46.30	16
Jules Segers	Slalom, standing	48.22	17	58.36	17	1:46.58	17
Lou Braz-Dagand	Slalom, sitting	47.14	10	58.53	10	1:45.67	7
Hyacinthe Deleplace; Guide: Valentin Giraud Moine	Super combined, visually impaired	1:09.12	1	47.62	6	1:56.74	5
Arthur Bauchet	Super combined, standing	1:10.88	1	39.38	1	1:50.26	1st place, gold medalist(s)
Manoel Bourdenx	Super combined, standing	1:13.65	5	45.26	16	1:58.91	12
Jordan Broisin	Super combined, standing	1:19.20	25	DNS			
Jules Segers	Super combined, standing	1:17.59	24	DNF			
Lou Braz-Dagand	Super combined, sitting	1:18.30	15	50.16	8	2:08.46	8
Hyacinthe Deleplace; Guide: Valentin Giraud Moine	Super-G, visually impaired	—N/a				1:09.78	4
Arthur Bauchet	Super-G, standing	—N/a				1:10.36	4
Manoel Bourdenx	Super-G, standing	—N/a				1:12.97	7
Jordan Broisin	Super-G, standing	—N/a				1:14.21	14
Oscar Burnham	Super-G, standing	—N/a				1:15.32	20
Jules Segers	Super-G, standing	—N/a				DNF	
Lou Braz-Dagand	Super-G, sitting	—N/a				1:17.20	13

Women

Athlete	Event	Run 1		Run 2		Total	
Athlete	Event	Time	Rank	Time	Rank	Time	Rank
Marie Bochet	Downhill, standing	—N/a				DNF	
Marie Bochet	Giant slalom, standing	59.80	5	1:02.78	3	2:02.58	4
Marie Bochet	Slalom, standing	49.49	4	DNF			
Marie Bochet	Super combined, standing	1:17.34	3	54.83	7	2:12.17	5
Marie Bochet	Super-G, standing	—N/a				1:14.97	2nd place, silver medalist(s)

== Biathlon ==
Two competitors competed in biathlon.

Men

Athlete	Events	Final		
Athlete	Events	Missed Shots	Result	Rank
Benjamin Daviet	6 km, standing	1	17:19.1	4
Benjamin Daviet	10 km, standing	4	34:15.1	6
Benjamin Daviet	12.5 km, standing	0	37:58.9	1st place, gold medalist(s)
Anthony Chalençon; Guide: Brice Ottonello	6 km, visually impaired	4	19:18.4	9
Anthony Chalençon; Guide: Brice Ottonello	10 km, visually impaired	12	43:13.4	9

== Cross-country skiing ==
France competed in cross-country skiing.

Men

Athlete	Event	Qualification		Semifinal		Final	
Athlete	Event	Result	Rank	Result	Rank	Result	Rank
Benjamin Daviet	1.5 km sprint, standing	2:44.59	2 Q	3:25.5	1 Q	3:07.5	1st place, gold medalist(s)
Benjamin Daviet	12.5 km free, standing	—N/a				33:09.1	2nd place, silver medalist(s)
Anthony Chalençon; Guide: Brice Ottonello	1.5 km sprint free, visually impaired	2:38.79	3 Q	3:34.9	1 Q	3:47.2	4
Anthony Chalençon; Guide: Alexandre Pouye	12.5 km free, visually impaired	—N/a				34:15.5	4

Relay

Athletes	Event	Final	
Athletes	Event	Time	Rank
Benjamin Daviet; Anthony Chalençon; Guide: Alexandre Pouye; Guide: Brice Ottonello	4 x 2.5 km open relay	28:30.4	2nd place, silver medalist(s)

== Snowboarding ==
Maxime Montaggioni and Mathias Menendez were among the snowboarders for France.

Banked slalom

Athlete	Event	Run 1	Run 2	Best	Rank
Maxime Montaggioni	Men's banked slalom SB-UL	1:09.87	1:09.41	1:09.41	1st place, gold medalist(s)
Mathias Menendez Garcia	Men's banked slalom SB-LL2	1:12.19	1:17.25	1:12.19	11
Laurent Vaglica	Men's banked slalom SB-LL2	DNF	1:25.15	1:25.15	23
Cécile Hernandez	Women's banked slalom SB-LL2	1:19.39	1:18.48	1:18.48	6

Snowboard cross

Athlete	Event	Qualification			Quarterfinal	Semifinal	Final
Athlete	Event	Run 1	Run 2	Rank	Position	Position	Position
Maxime Montaggioni	Men's snowboard cross SB-UL	1:03.70	1:03.72	6 Q	3	Did not advance	
Mathias Menendez Garcia	Men's snowboard cross SB-LL2	1:06.39	1:06.30	13 Q	4	Did not advance	
Laurent Vaglica	Men's snowboard cross SB-LL2	1:27.70	1:04.30	9 Q	DNS	Did not advance	
Cécile Hernandez	Women's snowboard cross SB-LL2	1:10.17	1:08.38	1 Q	1 Q	1 Q	1st place, gold medalist(s)

== See also ==
- France at the Paralympics
- France at the 2022 Winter Olympics
