= Cai Jiayun =

Chinese paralympic cross country skier

Personal information
- Nationality: Chinese

Sport
- Country: China
- Disability class: LW8
Medal record
Representing China
Winter Paralympics
Men's Paralympic cross-country skiing
| Silver medal – second place | 2022 Beijing | 20km classical standing |
| Silver medal – second place | 2022 Beijing | 4 × 2.5km mixed relay |
| Bronze medal – third place | 2022 Beijing | 12.5km free standing |
Men's para biathlon
Winter Paralympics
| Gold medal – first place | 2026 Milano Cortina | Sprint standing |
| Gold medal – first place | 2026 Milano Cortina | Sprint pursuit standing |
| Gold medal – first place | 2026 Milano Cortina | Individual standing |

Cai Jiayun is a Chinese paralympic cross country skier.

== Career ==
He represented China at the 2022 Winter Paralympics and won a silver medal in the 20 kilometre classical event with a time of 54:27.7, and a bronze medal in the 12.5 kilometre free event with a time of 33:18.0.
