= Zhang Mengqiu =

Chinese para-alpine skier (born 2002)

Personal information
- Born: 9 March 2002 (age 24)

Sport
- Country: China
- Sport: Para-alpine skiing
Medal record
Women's para alpine skiing
Representing China
Paralympic Games
Gold medal – first place	2022 Beijing	Super-G standing
Gold medal – first place	2022 Beijing	Giant slalom standing
Silver medal – second place	2022 Beijing	Downhill standing
Silver medal – second place	2022 Beijing	Super combined standing
Silver medal – second place	2022 Beijing	Slalom standing
World Championships
Silver medal – second place	2025 Maribor	Giant slalom standing
Silver medal – second place	2025 Maribor	Slalom standing

Zhang Mengqiu (born 9 March 2002) is a Chinese para-alpine skier. She won gold medals in the super-G and giant slalom events, and silver medals in the downhill, slalom and super combined standing events at the 2022 Winter Paralympics in Beijing, China.
