= Momoka Muraoka =

Japanese Para alpine skier (born 1997)

Momoka Muraoka 村岡桃佳
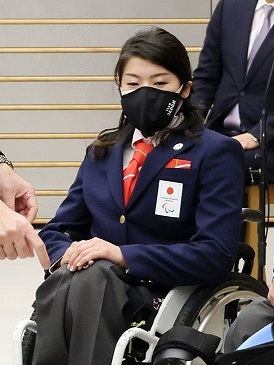
- Muraoka in 2022

Personal information
- Nationality: Japanese
- Born: 3 March 1997 (age 29) Fukaya, Saitama, Japan
- Education: Waseda University

Sport
- Country: Japan
- Sport: Para alpine skiing
- Disability class: LW10-2
Medal record
Women's Para alpine skiing
Representing Japan
Paralympic Games
Gold medal – first place	2018 Pyeongchang	Giant slalom
Gold medal – first place	2022 Beijing	Downhill
Gold medal – first place	2022 Beijing	Super-G
Gold medal – first place	2022 Beijing	Giant slalom
Silver medal – second place	2018 Pyeongchang	Downhill
Silver medal – second place	2018 Pyeongchang	Slalom
Silver medal – second place	2022 Beijing	Super combined
Silver medal – second place	2026 Milano Cortina	Super-G
Silver medal – second place	2026 Milano Cortina	Giant slalom sitting
Bronze medal – third place	2018 Pyeongchang	Super-G
Bronze medal – third place	2018 Pyeongchang	Super combined
World Championships
Gold medal – first place	2025 Maribor	Giant slalom

Momoka Muraoka (村岡 桃佳, Muraoka Momoka; born 3 March 1997 in Fukaya, Saitama) is a woman Para alpine skier, who won five medals for Japan at the 2018 Winter Paralympics. She also served as their flag-bearer at the 2018 Winter Paralympics Parade of Nations. She graduated from Waseda University with a degree in Sports science.

She won the gold medal in the women's downhill, women's super-G, and women's giant slalom at the 2022 Winter Paralympics.
