= Anna-Maria Rieder =

German para alpine skier (born 2000)

Personal information
- Born: 2 February 2000 (age 26) Garmisch-Partenkirchen

Sport
- Country: Germany
- Sport: Alpine skiing
- Disability: Hemiparese
- Disability class: LW9-1
- Coached by: Justus Wolf
Medal record
Women's para alpine skiing
Representing Germany
Paralympic Games
Bronze medal – third place	2022 Beijing	Slalom standing
World Championships
Gold medal – first place	2023 Lleida	Downhill standing
Silver medal – second place	2023 Lleida	Alpine combined standing
Silver medal – second place	2023 Lleida	Giant slalom standing
Bronze medal – third place	2017 Tarvisio	Slalom standing
Bronze medal – third place	2021 Lillehammer	Super combined standing
Bronze medal – third place	2023 Lleida	Super-G standing
Bronze medal – third place	2025 Maribor	Slalom standing

Anna-Maria Rieder (born 2 February 2000) is a German para alpine skier who competed at the 2018 and 2022 Winter Paralympics.

== Career ==
Rieder made her international debut at the 2017 World Para Alpine Skiing Championships and won a bronze medal in the slalom standing event.

She represented Germany at the 2018 Winter Paralympics and finished in sixth place in the giant slalom event.

She again represented Germany at the 2022 Winter Paralympics, and won a bronze medal in the slalom standing event. She also finished in fourth place in the super combined, and fifth place in the super-G and giant slalom events.
