= Eva Nikou =

Greek para alpine skier (born 2000)

Personal information
- Full name: Evangelia Nikou
- Born: 20 June 2000 (age 26)

Sport
- Country: Greece
- Sport: Alpine skiing
- Disability: Visually impaired
- Disability class: AS3
Medal record
Women's para alpine skiing
Representing Greece
World Championships
Bronze medal – third place	2023 Lleida	Alpine combined
Bronze medal – third place	2023 Lleida	Super-G

Evangelia (Eva) Nikou (Greek: Ευαγγελία (Εύα) Νίκου, born 20 June 2000) is a Greek visually impaired para alpine skier. She represented Greece at the 2022 and 2026 Winter Paralympics.

== Career ==
Nikou represented Greece at the 2022 Winter Paralympics and finished in sixth place in the super-G event. She suffered a torn ACL and did not compete in the final two events of the Paralympics.

Nikou competed at the 2023 World Para Alpine Skiing Championships and won bronze medals in the alpine combined and Super-G events.

In March 2026, she was selected to represent Greece at the 2026 Winter Paralympics.
