= Liu Sitong =

Chinese Para alpine skier (born 1994)

Personal information
- Born: 25 July 1994 (age 32)

Sport
- Country: China
- Sport: Para alpine skiing
Medal record
Women's Para alpine skiing
Representing China
Paralympic Games
| Silver medal – second place | 2022 Beijing | Giant slalom sitting |
| Bronze medal – third place | 2022 Beijing | Downhill sitting |
| Bronze medal – third place | 2022 Beijing | Super combined sitting |
| Bronze medal – third place | 2022 Beijing | Slalom sitting |
| Bronze medal – third place | 2026 Milano Cortina | Downhill sitting |
| Bronze medal – third place | 2026 Milano Cortina | Super-G sitting |
| Bronze medal – third place | 2026 Milano Cortina | Super combined sitting |
| Bronze medal – third place | 2026 Milano Cortina | Giant slalom sitting |
World Championships
| Bronze medal – third place | 2025 Maribor | Giant slalom sitting |
| Bronze medal – third place | 2025 Maribor | Slalom sitting |

Liu Sitong (born 25 July 1994) is a Chinese Para alpine skier.

== Career ==
She represented China at the 2018 Winter Paralympics held in Pyeongchang, South Korea. She competed in the women's slalom and women's giant slalom events.

She represented China at the 2022 Winter Paralympics held in Beijing, China and won four medals, silver in the giant slalom, and bronze in women's downhill, slalom and super combined sitting events.
