= Liu Mengtao =

Chinese paralympic biathlete

Personal information
- Born: 23 November 2001 (age 24)

Sport
- Country: China
- Sport: Biathlon
- Disability class: LW12
Medal record
Representing China
Men's para biathlon
Paralympic Games
Gold medal – first place	2022 Beijing	10 km sitting
Gold medal – first place	2022 Beijing	12.5 km sitting
Silver medal – second place	2026 Milano Cortina	Sprint sitting
Bronze medal – third place	2022 Beijing	6 km sitting

Liu Mengtao (born 23 November 2001) is a Chinese para biathlete who competed at the 2022 and 2026 Winter Paralympics.

== Career ==
He competed at the 2022 Winter Paralympics in the biathlon competition, winning the gold medal in the men's 10 kilometres sitting event and the bronze medal in the men's 6 kilometres sitting event.
