= Ebba Årsjö =

Swedish Para alpine skier (born 2001)

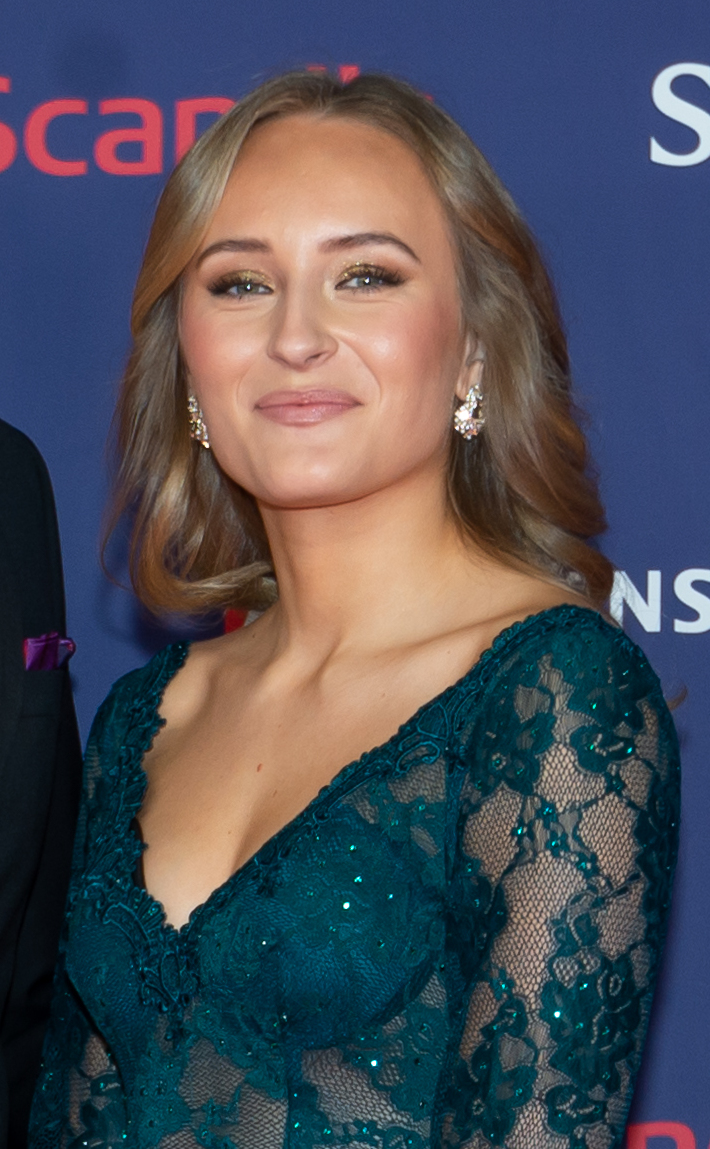
- Årsjö in 2023

Personal information
- Born: 12 January 2001 (age 25) Oskarshamn Municipality, Sweden

Sport
- Country: Sweden
- Sport: Para alpine skiing
- Disability: Klippel–Trénaunay syndrome
- Disability class: LW4
Medal record
Women's Para alpine skiing
Representing Sweden
Event	1st	2nd	3rd
Paralympic Games	5	0	2
World Championships	8	0	0
Total	13	0	2
Paralympic Games
Gold medal – first place	2022 Beijing	Super combined standing
Gold medal – first place	2022 Beijing	Slalom standing
Gold medal – first place	2026 Milano Cortina	Downhill standing
Gold medal – first place	2026 Milano Cortina	Super combined standing
Gold medal – first place	2026 Milano Cortina	Giant slalom standing
Bronze medal – third place	2022 Beijing	Downhill standing
Bronze medal – third place	2026 Milano Cortina	Super-G standing
World Championships
Gold medal – first place	2021 Lillehammer	Slalom standing
Gold medal – first place	2021 Lillehammer	Parallel event
Gold medal – first place	2023 Lleida	Super-G standing
Gold medal – first place	2023 Lleida	Slalom standing
Gold medal – first place	2023 Lleida	Giant slalom standing
Gold medal – first place	2023 Lleida	Alpine combined standing
Gold medal – first place	2025 Maribor	Giant slalom standing
Gold medal – first place	2025 Maribor	Slalom standing

Ebba Årsjö (born 12 January 2001) is a Swedish Para alpine skier. She is a five-time Paralympic gold medalist.

== Career ==
Årsjö competed at the 2021 World Para Snow Sports Championships where she won gold medals in the slalom, and parallel event.

She competed at the 2022 Winter Paralympics and won gold medals in the super combined and slalom standing events. She also won the bronze medal in the downhill standing event. In 2022, she received the Victoria Award.

On 9 November 2022, she announced she would no longer compete in downhill skiing.

During the 2023–24 FIS Para Alpine Ski World Cup she won the overall crystal globe.

She competed at the 2026 Winter Paralympics and won a gold medal in the downhill standing event with a time of 1:22.00. She also won a bronze medal in the super-G standing event with a time of 1:17.64. She then went on to win a further two gold medals in the giant slalom and super combined.

== Personal life ==
She was born with Klippel–Trénaunay syndrome which resulted in muscle reduction in her right leg.

Årsjö's uncle, Johannes Årsjö, is a former strongman.
