= Zhang Wenjing =

Chinese para-alpine skier (born 2002)

Personal information
- Born: 12 August 2002 (age 24)

Sport
- Country: China
- Sport: Para alpine skiing
- Disability class: LW12-1
- Coached by: Dario Capelli
Medal record
Women's Para alpine skiing
Representing China
Paralympic Games
Gold medal – first place	2026 Milano Cortina	Slalom sitting
Silver medal – second place	2022 Beijing	Slalom sitting
Bronze medal – third place	2022 Beijing	Super-G sitting
Bronze medal – third place	2022 Beijing	Giant slalom sitting

Zhang Wenjing (born 12 August 2002) is a Chinese Para alpine skier who competed at the 2022 Winter Paralympics.

== Career ==
Wenjing represented China at the 2022 Winter Paralympics and won a silver medal in the slalom and bronze medals in the super-G and giant slalom sitting events.
