= Dang Hesong =

Chinese Para biathlete and cross-country skier (born 1999)

Personal information
- Born: 25 August 1999 (age 27)

Sport
- Country: China
- Sport: Para biathlon
- Disability: Visually impaired
- Disability class: NS2
Medal record
Representing China
Winter Paralympics
Men's Para biathlon
Gold medal – first place	2026 Milano Cortina	12.5 km individual
Men's Para cross-country skiing
Gold medal – first place	2026 Milano Cortina	4 × 2.5 km relay open

Dang Hesong (Chinese: 党和松, born 25 August 1999) is a Chinese visually impaired Para biathlete and cross-country skier. He represented China at the 2022 and 2026 Winter Paralympics.

== Career ==
In February 2026, he was selected to represent China at the 2026 Winter Paralympics. He won a gold medal in the 12.5 kilometre individual event.
