= Biathlon at the 2022 Winter Paralympics =

Biathlon at the XIII Paralympic Winter Games
- Venue: National Biathlon Center
- Dates: 5–11 March
- Competitors: 86 from 14 nations

Biathlon was one of the competitions at the 2022 Winter Paralympics in Beijing, China. In total, 18 medal events were held.

== Medal summary ==
=== Medal table ===
The ranking in the table is based on information provided by the International Paralympic Committee (IPC) and will be consistent with IPC convention in its published medal tables. By default, the table will be ordered by the number of gold medals the athletes from a nation have won (in this context, a "nation" is an entity represented by a National Paralympic Committee). The number of silver medals is taken into consideration next and then the number of bronze medals. If nations are still tied, equal ranking is given and they are listed alphabetically by IPC country code.

* Host nation (China)

| Rank | Nation | Gold | Silver | Bronze | Total |
|---|---|---|---|---|---|
| 1 | Ukraine (UKR) | 8 | 9 | 5 | 22 |
| 2 | China (CHN)* | 4 | 2 | 6 | 12 |
| 3 | United States (USA) | 3 | 2 | 1 | 6 |
| 4 | Germany (GER) | 1 | 4 | 3 | 8 |
| 5 | Canada (CAN) | 1 | 1 | 2 | 4 |
| 6 | France (FRA) | 1 | 0 | 0 | 1 |
| 7 | Kazakhstan (KAZ) | 0 | 0 | 1 | 1 |
| Totals (7 entries) | | 18 | 18 | 18 | 54 |

=== Women's events ===
| Event | Class | Gold | | Silver | | Bronze | |
|---|---|---|---|---|---|---|---|
| 6 kilometres | Visually impaired | Oksana Shyshkova; Guide: Andriy Marchenko; Ukraine | 20:09.0 | Linn Kazmaier; Guide: Florian Baumann; Germany | 20:14.6 | Leonie Maria Walter; Guide: Pirmin Strecker; Germany | 20:39.0 |
| 6 kilometres | Sitting | Oksana Masters; United States | 20:51.2 | Shan Yilin; China | 21:06.3 | Kendall Gretsch; United States | 21:52.9 |
| 6 kilometres | Standing | Guo Yujie; China | 19:43.3 | Liudmyla Liashenko; Ukraine | 19:51.7 | Zhao Zhiqing; China | 20:05.1 |
| 10 kilometres | Visually impaired | Leonie Maria Walter; Guide: Pirmin Strecker; Germany | 40:56.2 | Oksana Shyshkova; Guide: Andriy Marchenko; Ukraine | 40:59.9 | Wang Yue; Guide: Li Yalin; China | 42:50.3 |
| 10 kilometres | Sitting | Kendall Gretsch; United States | 33:12.3 | Oksana Masters; United States | 33:21.0 | Anja Wicker; Germany | 35:45.3 |
| 10 kilometres | Standing | Iryna Bui; Ukraine | 36:43.1 | Oleksandra Kononova; Ukraine | 36:55.9 | Liudmyla Liashenko; Ukraine | 36:56.9 |
| 12.5 kilometres | Visually impaired | Oksana Shyshkova; Guide: Andriy Marchenko; Ukraine | 50:19.6 | Linn Kazmaier; Guide: Florian Baumann; Germany | 50:23.2 | Leonie Maria Walter; Guide: Pirmin Strecker; Germany | 52:27.6 |
| 12.5 kilometres | Sitting | Oksana Masters; United States | 41:17.9 | Kendall Gretsch; United States | 42:23.7 | Shan Yilin; China | 42:36.6 |
| 12.5 kilometres | Standing | Liudmyla Liashenko; Ukraine | 47:22.0 | Zhao Zhiqing; China | 48:06.3 | Brittany Hudak; Canada | 49:03.4 |

=== Men's events ===
| Event | Class | Gold | | Silver | | Bronze | |
|---|---|---|---|---|---|---|---|
| 6 kilometres | Visually impaired | Vitaliy Lukyanenko; Guide: Borys Babar; Ukraine | 17:05.8 | Oleksandr Kazik; Guide: Serhii Kucheriavyi; Ukraine | 17:31.9 | Dmytro Suiarko; Guide: Oleksandr Nikonovych; Ukraine | 17:33.3 |
| 6 kilometres | Sitting | Liu Zixu; China | 18:51.5 | Taras Rad; Ukraine | 19:09.0 | Liu Mengtao; China | 19:32.3 |
| 6 kilometres | Standing | Grygorii Vovchynskyi; Ukraine | 16:17.6 | Marco Maier; Germany | 17:03.4 | Mark Arendz; Canada | 17:13.6 |
| 10 kilometres | Visually impaired | Vitaliy Lukyanenko; Guide: Borys Babar; Ukraine | 34:12.7 | Anatolii Kovalevskyi; Guide: Oleksandr Mukshyn; Ukraine | 34:57.3 | Dmytro Suiarko; Guide: Oleksandr Nikonovych; Ukraine | 35:30.9 |
| 10 kilometres | Sitting | Liu Mengtao; China | 30:37.7 | Martin Fleig; Germany | 31:23.7 | Taras Rad; Ukraine | 31:26.9 |
| 10 kilometres | Standing | Mark Arendz; Canada | 31:45.2 | Grygorii Vovchynskyi; Ukraine | 32:18.0 | Alexandr Gerlits; Kazakhstan | 33:06.5 |
| 12.5 kilometres | Visually impaired | Oleksandr Kazik; Guide: Serhii Kucheriavyi; Ukraine | 43:16.1 | Vitaliy Lukyanenko; Guide: Borys Babar; Ukraine | 44:44.3 | Yu Shuang; Guide: Wang Guanyu; China | 46:35.3 |
| 12.5 kilometres | Sitting | Liu Mengtao; China | 38:29.4 | Taras Rad; Ukraine | 39:13.9 | Liu Zixu; China | 39:27.5 |
| 12.5 kilometres | Standing | Benjamin Daviet; France | 37:58.9 | Mark Arendz; Canada | 40:13.0 | Grygorii Vovchynskyi; Ukraine | 40:13.0 |

== Participating nations ==
- Austria (1)
- Canada (7)
- China (21)
- France (2)
- Germany (8)
- Great Britain (3)
- Japan (3)
- Kazakhstan (3)
- Norway (1)
- Poland (6)
- South Korea (2)
- Sweden (1)
- Ukraine (20)
- United States (8)

== See also ==
- Biathlon at the 2022 Winter Olympics
