= Martina Vozza =

Italian Para alpine skier (born 2004)

Personal information
- Nationality: Italian
- Born: 3 April 2004 (age 22)

Sport
- Country: Italy
- Sport: Para alpine skiing
- Disability class: AS3
Medal record
Women's Para alpine skiing
Representing Italy
World Championships
Silver medal – second place	2023 Lleida	Downhill
Silver medal – second place	2023 Lleida	Super-G
Bronze medal – third place	2021 Lillehammer	Slalom

Martina Vozza (born 3 April 2004) is an Italian visually impaired Para alpine skier.

== Career ==
Vozza made her debut at the 2021 World Para Snow Sports Championships held in Lillehammer, Norway where she won the bronze medal in the slalom event. She qualified to compete at the 2022 Winter Paralympics held in Beijing, China.
