= Katie Combaluzier =

Canadian para alpine skier (born 1994)

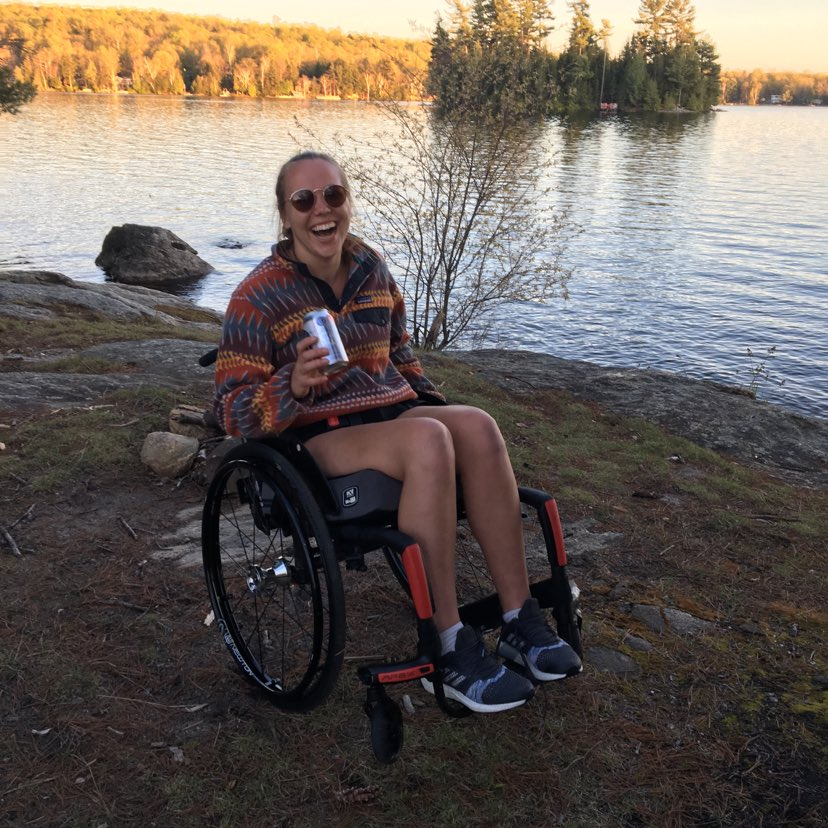
- Combaluzier in Haliburton, March 2022

Personal information
- Born: January 18, 1994 (age 32) Toronto, Ontario, Canada
- Height: 5 ft 6 in (168 cm)

Sport
- Country: Canada
- Sport: Alpine skiing
- Disability class: LW12-1
Medal record
Women's para alpine skiing
Representing Canada
World Championships
Silver medal – second place	2021 Lillehammer	Super combined
Silver medal – second place	2021 Lillehammer	Giant slalom
Bronze medal – third place	2021 Lillehammer	Downhill

Katie Combaluzier (born January 18, 1994) is a Canadian para alpine skier who competed at the 2022 Winter Paralympics.

== Career ==
Combaluzier made her debut at the 2021 World Para Snow Sports Championships where she won the silver medal in the super combined and giant slalom events. She also finished third in the downhill event. Combaluzier qualified to compete at the 2022 Winter Paralympics.
