= Chronological summary of the 2026 Winter Paralympics =

This is a chronological summary of the major events of the 2026 Winter Paralympics held in Milan, Cortina d'Ampezzo, and other areas in Lombardy and Northeast Italy. Competition began on 4 March with the first matches in the round robin stages of the wheelchair curling event. The opening ceremony was held two days later on 6 March. The last day of competition and the closing ceremony were held on 15 March. The games featured 79 medal events in six disciplines.

== Calendar ==
Competition began two days before the opening ceremony on 4 March, and ended on 15 March 2026.

OC	Opening ceremony	●	Event competitions	1	Event finals	CC	Closing ceremony

March 2026	04 Wed	05 Thu	06 Fri	07 Sat	08 Sun	09 Mon	10 Tue	11 Wed	12 Thu	13 Fri	14 Sat	15 Sun	Events
Ceremonies			OC									CC	—N/a
Para alpine skiing				6		6	6		3	3	3	3	30
Para biathlon				6	6					6			18
Para cross-country skiing							6	6			2	6	20
Para ice hockey				●		●	●		●	●	●	1	1
Para snowboard				●	4					4			8
Wheelchair curling	●	●	●	●	●	●	●	1	●	●	1		2
Daily medal events	0	0	0	12	10	6	12	7	3	13	6	10	79
Cumulative total	0	0	0	12	22	28	40	47	50	63	69	79	79
March 2026	04 Wed	05 Thu	06 Fri	07 Sat	08 Sun	09 Mon	10 Tue	11 Wed	12 Thu	13 Fri	14 Sat	15 Sun	Total events

== Medal table ==
* Host nation (Italy)

2026 Winter Paralympics medal table
Rank	NPC	Gold	Silver	Bronze	Total
1	China	15	13	16	44
2	United States	13	5	6	24
3	Russia	8	1	3	12
4	Italy*	7	7	2	16
5	Austria	7	2	4	13
6	France	4	4	4	12
7	Ukraine	3	8	8	19
8	Canada	3	4	8	15
9	Netherlands	3	3	1	7
10	Sweden	3	0	4	7
11–27	Remaining NPCs	13	32	24	69
Totals (27 entries)		79	79	80	238

== Day-by-day summaries ==
=== 4 March ===
Wheelchair curling

- The first matches in the round-robin stage of the mixed doubles tournament.

=== 5 March ===
Wheelchair curling

- The second day in the round-robin stage of the mixed doubles tournament.

=== 6 March ===
Wheelchair curling

- The third day in the round-robin stage of the mixed doubles tournament.

Opening ceremony

- The opening ceremony was held at Verona Arena.

=== Day 1 — Saturday 7 March ===
Para alpine skiing

Event	Class	Gold		Silver		Bronze	
Women's downhill	Visually impaired	Veronika Aigner; Guide: Lilly Sammer; Austria	1:22.55	Chiara Mazzel; Guide: Nicola Cotti Cottini; Italy	1:23.03	Alexandra Rexová; Guide: Sophia Polak; Slovakia	1:27.45
Women's downhill	Sitting	Anna-Lena Forster; Germany	1:25.79	Audrey Pascual; Spain	1:25.84	Liu Sitong; China	1:31.27
Women's downhill	Standing	Ebba Årsjö; Sweden	1:22.00	Aurélie Richard; France	1:23.71	Varvara Voronchikhina; Russia	1:24.47
Men's downhill	Visually impaired	Johannes Aigner; Guide: Nico Haberl; Austria	1:16.08	Kalle Ericsson; Guide: Sierra Smith; Canada	1:18.33	Giacomo Bertagnolli; Guide: Andrea Ravelli; Italy	1:18.64
Men's downhill	Sitting	Jesper Pedersen; Norway	1:18.14	Niels de Langen; Netherlands	1:19.24	Kurt Oatway; Canada	1:19.42
Men's downhill	Standing	Robin Cuche; Switzerland	1:17.79	Arthur Bauchet; France	1:18.40	Alexey Bugaev; Russia	1:18.94

Para biathlon

Event	Class	Gold		Silver		Bronze	
Women's sprint	Visually impaired	Wang Yue; Guide: Chen Guoming; China	19:52.5	Carina Edlingerová; Guide: Alexandr Patava; Czech Republic	20:20.5	Leonie Walter; Guide: Christian Krasman; Germany	20:32.2
Women's sprint	Sitting	Oksana Masters; United States	21:21.3	Kendall Gretsch; United States	21:37.3	Anja Wicker; Germany	22:32.4
Women's sprint	Standing	Oleksandra Kononova; Ukraine	18:41.5	Natalie Wilkie; Canada	18:46.4	Liudmyla Liashenko; Ukraine	19:13.9
Men's sprint	Visually impaired	Oleksandr Kazik; Guide: Serhii Kucheriavyi; Ukraine	17:37.7	Iaroslav Reshetynskyi; Guide: Dmytro Drahun; Ukraine	18:40.1	Anatolii Kovalevskyi; Guide: Oleksandr Mukshyn; Ukraine	18:43.8
Men's sprint	Sitting	Taras Rad; Ukraine	19:55.5	Liu Mengtao; China	20:04.8	Liu Zixu; China	20:13.1
Men's sprint	Standing	Cai Jiayun; China	17:13.6	Liu Xiaobin; China	17:35.4	Marco Maier; Germany	17:42.4

=== Day 2 — Sunday 8 March ===
Para biathlon

Event	Class	Gold		Silver		Bronze	
Women's Individual	Visually impaired	Wang Yue; Guide: Chen Guoming; China	35:04.7	Simona Bubeníčková; Guide: David Srutek; Czech Republic	36:43.9	Johanna Recktenwald; Guide: Emily Rose Weiss; Germany	37:05.2
Women's Individual	Sitting	Kim Yun-ji; South Korea	38:00.1	Anja Wicker; Germany	38:12.9	Kendall Gretsch; United States	38:36.1
Women's Individual	Standing	Natalie Wilkie; Canada	33:01.8	Zhao Zhiqing; China	33:33.5	Oleksandra Kononova; Ukraine	33:37.9
Men's Individual	Visually impaired	Dang Hesong; Guide: Lu Hongda; China	31:31.9	Maksym Murashkovskyi; Guide: Vitaliy Trush; Ukraine	33:41.1	Dmytro Suiarko; Guide: Oleksandr Nikonovych; Ukraine	33:51.1
Men's Individual	Sitting	Liu Zixu; China	34:38.1	Mao Zhongwu; China	35:06.5	Taras Rad; Ukraine	35:57.1
Men's Individual	Standing	Cai Jiayun; China	30:24.1	Mark Arendz; Canada	30:52.5	Marco Maier; Germany	31:07.3

Para snowboard

Event	Class	Gold	Silver	Bronze
Women's snowboard cross	SB-LL2	Cécile Hernandez; France	Kate Delson; United States	Wang Xinyu; China
Men's snowboard cross	SB-UL	Ji Lijia; China	Zhu Yonggang; China	Aron Fahrni; Switzerland
Men's snowboard cross	SB-LL1	Wu Zhongwei; China	Noah Elliott; United States	Tyler Turner; Canada
Men's snowboard cross	SB-LL2	Emanuel Perathoner; Italy	Ben Tudhope; Australia	Lee Je-hyuk; South Korea

=== Day 3 — Monday 9 March ===
Para alpine skiing

Event	Class	Gold		Silver		Bronze	
Women's super-G	Visually impaired	Chiara Mazzel; Guide: Nicola Cottini Cottini; Italy	1:14.84	Veronika Aigner; Guide: Lilly Sammer; Austria	1:15.44	Alexandra Rexová; Guide: Sophia Polak; Slovakia	1:19.69
Women's super-G	Sitting	Audrey Pascual; Spain	1:17.82	Momoka Muraoka; Japan	1:24.14	Liu Sitong; China	1:24.91
Women's super-G	Standing	Varvara Voronchikhina; Russia	1:15.60	Aurélie Richard; France	1:17.56	Ebba Årsjö; Sweden	1:17.64
Men's super-G	Visually impaired	Johannes Aigner; Guide: Nico Haberl; Austria	1:11.99	Giacomo Bertagnolli; Guide: Andrea Ravelli; Italy	1:12.15	Kalle Ericsson; Guide: Sierra Smith; Canada	1:13.29
Men's super-G	Sitting	Jeroen Kampschreur; Netherlands	1:13.08	Jesper Pedersen; Norway	1:13.80	Andrew Kurka; United States	1:13.95
Men's super-G	Standing	Robin Cuche; Switzerland	1:12.12	Patrick Halgren; United States	1:13.10	Jules Segers; France	1:13.59

=== Day 4 — Tuesday 10 March ===
Para alpine skiing

Event	Class	Gold		Silver		Bronze	
Women's super combined	Visually impaired	Veronika Aigner; Guide: Lilly Sammer; Austria	2:01.75	Chiara Mazzel; Guide: Nicola Cotti Cottini; Italy	2:04.81	Elina Stary; Guide: Stefan Winter; Austria	2:05.65
Women's super combined	Sitting	Audrey Pascual; Spain	2:11.22	Anna-Lena Forster; Germany	2:11.68	Liu Sitong; China	2:14.53
Women's super combined	Standing	Ebba Årsjö; Sweden	2:00.15	Aurélie Richard; France	2:07.18	Zhu Wenjing; China	2:10.69
Men's super combined	Visually impaired	Giacomo Bertagnolli; Guide: Andrea Ravelli; Italy	1:56.42	Neil Simpson; Guide: Rob Poth; Great Britain	1:57.07	Johannes Aigner; Guide: Nico Haberl; Austria	1:57.46
Men's super combined	Sitting	Jeroen Kampschreur; Netherlands	1:56.33	René De Silvestro; Italy	1:56.44	Niels de Langen; Netherlands	1:57.59
Men's super combined	Standing	Arthur Bauchet; France	1:58.17	Federico Pelizzari; Italy	1:59.37	Thomas Grochar; Austria	1:59.99

Para cross-country skiing

Event	Class	Gold		Silver		Bronze	
Women's sprint classical	Visually impaired	Anastasiia Bagiian; Guide: Sergei Siniakin; Russia	3:16.1	Linn Kazmaier; Guide: Florian Baumann; Germany	3:25.3	Cong Jihong; Guide: Liu Jiaxuan; China	3:30.2
Women's sprint classical	Sitting	Oksana Masters; United States	3:07.1	Kim Yun-ji; South Korea	3:10.1	Wang Shiyu; China	3:17.9
Women's sprint classical	Standing	Vilde Nilsen; Norway	3:31.3	Sydney Peterson; United States	3:35.5	Natalie Wilkie; Canada	3:40.2
Men's sprint classical	Visually impaired	Jake Adicoff; Guide: Peter Wolter; United States	2:44.7	Yu Shuang; Guide: Shang Jincai; China	2:46.2	Zebastian Modin; Guide: Emil Talsi; Sweden	2:50.9
Men's sprint classical	Sitting	Liu Zixu; China	2:28.9	Cristian Ribera; Brazil	2:29.6	Yerbol Khamitov; Kazakhstan	2:29.9
Men's sprint classical	Standing	Raman Svirydzenka; Belarus	2:35.4	Sebastian Marburger; Germany	2:38.1	Benjamin Daviet; France	2:42.2

=== Day 5 — Wednesday 11 March ===
Para cross-country skiing

Event	Class	Gold		Silver		Bronze	
Women's 10 kilometre classical	Visually impaired	Anastasiia Bagiian; Guide: Sergei Siniakin; Russia	29:39.7	Simona Bubeníčková; Guide: David Srutek; Czech Republic	31:59.1	Leonie Walter; Guide: Christian Krasman; Germany	35:30.8
Women's 10 kilometre classical	Sitting	Oksana Masters; United States	26:31.6	Kim Yun-ji; South Korea	26:51.6	Kendall Gretsch; United States	27:27.6
Women's 10 kilometre classical	Standing	Sydney Peterson; United States	29:49.2	Vilde Nilsen; Norway	29:51.8	Brittany Hudak; Canada	32:01.0
Men's 10 kilometre classical	Visually impaired	Jake Adicoff; Guide: Reid Goble; United States	28:03.6	Inkki Inola; Guide: Reetu Inkila; Finland	29:52.3	Zebastian Modin; Guide: Emil Talsi; Sweden	30:07.9
Men's 10 kilometre classical	Sitting	Ivan Golubkov; Russia	24:05.8	Mao Zhongwu; China	24:22.1	Zheng Peng; China	24:24.5
Men's 10 kilometre classical	Standing	Karl Tabouret; France	27:10.7	Raman Svirydzenka; Belarus	27:38.4	Mark Arendz; Canada	27:59.3

Wheelchair curling

Event	Gold	Silver	Bronze
Mixed doubles	Wang Meng; Yang Jinqiao; China	Baek Hye-jin; Lee Yong-suk; South Korea	Poļina Rožkova; Agris Lasmans; Latvia

=== Day 6 — Thursday 12 March ===
Para alpine skiing

Event	Class	Gold		Silver		Bronze	
Women's giant slalom	Visually impaired	Veronika Aigner; Guide: Eric Digruber; Austria	2:18.63	Chiara Mazzel; Guide: Nicola Cotti Cottini; Italy	2:21.19	Elina Stary; Guide: Stefan Winter; Austria	2:25.30
Women's giant slalom	Sitting	Anna-Lena Forster; Germany	2:30.64	Momoka Muraoka; Japan	2:31.92	Liu Sitong; China	2:34.79
Women's giant slalom	Standing	Ebba Årsjö; Sweden	2:22.42	Varvara Voronchikhina; Russia	2:25.26	Aurélie Richard; France	2:27.04

=== Day 7 — Friday 13 March ===
Para alpine skiing

Event	Class	Gold		Silver		Bronze	
Men's giant slalom	Visually impaired	Johannes Aigner; Guide: Nico Haberl; Austria	2:07.83	Giacomo Bertagnolli; Guide: Andrea Ravelli; Italy	2:08.17	Michał Gołaś; Guide: Kacper Walas; Poland	2:09.91
Men's giant slalom	Sitting	René De Silvestro; Italy	2:10.44	Niels de Langen; Netherlands	2:11.01	Jesper Pedersen; Norway	2:14.59
Men's giant slalom	Standing	Arthur Bauchet; France	2:07.76	Robin Cuche; Switzerland	2:09.72	Alexey Bugaev; Russia	2:11.14

Para biathlon

Event	Class	Gold		Silver		Bronze	
Women's sprint pursuit	Visually impaired	Carina Edlingerová; Guide: Alexandr Patava; Czech Republic	13:38.1	Wang Yue; Guide: Chen Guoming; China	13:48.0	Simona Bubeníčková; Guide: David Srutek; Czech Republic	13:59.2
Women's sprint pursuit	Visually impaired	Carina Edlingerová; Guide: Alexandr Patava; Czech Republic	13:38.1	Wang Yue; Guide: Chen Guoming; China	13:48.0	Leonie Walter; Guide: Christian Krasman; Germany	13:59.2
Women's sprint pursuit	Sitting	Kendall Gretsch; United States	11:33.1	Kim Yun-ji; South Korea	11:41.6	Anja Wicker; Germany	12:39.1
Women's sprint pursuit	Standing	Natalie Wilkie; Canada	12:18.0	Iryna Buy; Ukraine	12:35.7	Oleksandra Kononova; Ukraine	12:49.0
Men's sprint pursuit	Visually impaired	Yu Shuang; Guide: Shang Jincai; China	11:39.2	Oleksandr Kazik; Guide: Serhii Kucheriavyi; Ukraine	11:53.0	Anatolii Kovalevskyi; Guide: Oleksandr Mukshyn; Ukraine	12:13.7
Men's sprint pursuit	Sitting	Yerbol Khamitov; Kazakhstan	9:39.0	Taras Rad; Ukraine	10:00.5	Liu Zixu; China	10:11.5
Men's sprint pursuit	Standing	Cai Jiayun; China	10:33.4	Grygorii Vovchynskyi; Ukraine	10:33.6	Marco Maier; Germany	11:08.5

Para snowboard

Event	Class	Gold		Silver		Bronze	
Women's banked slalom	SB-LL2	Kate Delson; United States	1:02.99	Lisa Bunschoten; Netherlands	1:03.53	Brenna Huckaby; United States	1:03.98
Men's banked slalom	SB-UL	Jacopo Luchini; Italy	56.28	Wang Pengyao; China	56.62	Jiang Zihao; China	57.03
Men's banked slalom	SB-LL1	Noah Elliott; United States	58.94	Daichi Oguri; Japan	59.02	Mike Schultz; United States	1:00.05
Men's banked slalom	SB-LL2	Emanuel Perathoner; Italy	54.28	Fabrice von Grünigen; Switzerland	56.29	Ben Tudhope; Australia	57.33

=== Day 8 — Saturday 14 March ===
Para alpine skiing

Event	Class	Gold		Silver		Bronze	
Women's slalom	Visually impaired	Veronika Aigner; Guide: Lilly Sammer; Austria	1:22.73	Elina Stary; Guide: Stefan Winter; Austria	1:26.77	Alexandra Rexová; Guide: Sophia Polak; Slovakia	1:31.97
Women's slalom	Sitting	Zhang Wenjing; China	1:27.69	Nette Kiviranta; Finland	1:27.96	Audrey Pascual; Spain	1:28.04
Women's slalom	Standing	Varvara Voronchikhina; Russia	1:26.95	Zhu Wenjing; China	1:28.44	Michaela Gosselin; Canada	1:29.19

Para cross-country skiing

Event	Gold		Silver		Bronze	
Mixed 4 × 2.5 kilometre relay	Joshua Sweeney; Oksana Masters; Sydney Peterson; Jake Adicoff; Guide: Reid Goble; United States	23:24.2	Pavlo Bal; Taras Rad; Oleksandra Kononova; Liudmyla Liashenko; Ukraine	23:36.7	Mao Zhongwu; Zheng Peng; Huang Lingxin; Wang Yue; Guide: Chen Guoming; China	23:56.5
Open 4 × 2.5 kilometre relay	Wang Tao; Wang Chenyang; Dang Hesong; Guide: Lu Hongda; Yu Shuang; Guide: Shang Jincai; China	21:54.4	Sebastian Marburger; Marco Maier; Theo Bold; Guide: Jakob Bold; Linn Kazmaier; Guide: Florian Baumann; Germany	21:59.8	Kjartan Haugen; Vilde Nilsen; Thomas Oxaal; Guide: Geir Lervik; Norway	22:28.6

Wheelchair curling

Event	Gold	Silver	Bronze
Mixed team	Mark Ideson; Jon Thurston; Ina Forrest; Collinda Joseph; Gil Dash; Canada	Wang Haitao; Chen Jianxin; Zhang Mingliang; Li Nana; Zhang Qiang; China	Viljo Petersson-Dahl; Ronny Persson; Sabina Johansson; Kristina Ulander; Marcus Holm; Sweden (Note: Bronze medalist(s) determined on the previous day.)

=== Day 9 — Sunday 15 March ===
Para alpine skiing

Event	Class	Gold		Silver		Bronze	
Men's slalom	Visually impaired	Giacomo Bertagnolli; Guide: Andrea Ravelli; Italy	1:29.29	Michał Gołaś; Guide: Kacper Walas; Poland	1:29.56	Kalle Ericsson; Guide: Sierra Smith; Canada	1:31.26
Men's slalom	Sitting	Jeroen Kampschreur; Netherlands	1:29.72	Jesper Pedersen; Norway	1:31.11	Takeshi Suzuki; Japan	1:31.30
Men's slalom	Standing	Alexey Bugaev; Russia	1:28.55	Adam Hall; New Zealand	1:31.38	Robin Cuche; Switzerland	1:31.73

Para cross-country skiing

Event	Class	Gold		Silver		Bronze	
Women's 20 kilometre freestyle	Visually impaired	Anastasiia Bagiian; Guide: Sergei Siniakin; Russia	43:59.1	Simona Bubeníčková; Guide: David Srutek; Czech Republic	47:27.2	Wang Yue; Guide: Chen Guoming; China	48:58.7
Women's 20 kilometre freestyle	Sitting	Kim Yun-ji; South Korea	58:23.3	Anja Wicker; Germany	59:17.4	Oksana Masters; United States	59:34.5
Women's 20 kilometre freestyle	Standing	Sydney Peterson; United States	47:25.8	Vilde Nilsen; Norway	48:39.7	Oleksandra Kononova; Ukraine	48:43.4
Men's 20 kilometre freestyle	Visually impaired	Jake Adicoff; Guide: Peter Wolter; United States	42:17.4	Oleksandr Kazik; Guide: Serhii Kucheriavyi; Ukraine	42:24.6	Anthony Chalençon; Guide: Florian Michelon; France	43:21.9
Men's 20 kilometre freestyle	Sitting	Ivan Golubkov; Russia	51:55.0	Mao Zhongwu; China	52:45.8	Giuseppe Romele; Italy	53:17.1
Men's 20 kilometre freestyle	Standing	Wang Chenyang; China	41:15.2	Huang Lingxin; China	42:28.4	Liu Xiaobin; China	43:01.9

Para ice hockey

Event	Gold	Silver	Bronze
Mixed tournament	Kayden Beasley; Brett Bolton; Liam Cunningham; Travis Dodson; David Eustace; Declan Farmer; Griffin LaMarre; Noah Grove; Malik Jones; Jen Lee; Kevin McKee; Josh Misiewicz; Evan Nichols; Josh Pauls; Brody Roybal; Landon Uthke; Jack Wallace; United States	Rob Armstrong; Vincent Boily; Shawn Burnett; Dominic Cozzolino; Adam Dixon; James Dunn; Auren Halbert; Tyrone Henry; Liam Hickey; Anton Jacobs-Webb; Adam Kingsmill; Micah Kovacevich; Zach Lavin; Mathieu Lelièvre; Tyler McGregor; Corbin Watson; Greg Westlake; Canada	Wang Wei; Lyu Zhi; Wang Zhidong; Che Hang; Song Xiaodong; Shen Yifeng; Wang Jujiang; Zhang Zheng; Ji Yanzhao; Cui Yutao; Zhu Zhanfu; Tian Jintao; Qiu Dianpeng; Li Hongguan; Chen Hongyu; He Haoran; Liu Wenxu; China

Ceremonies

- The closing ceremony was held at the Cortina Olympic Ice Stadium.
