= Para cross-country skiing at the 2026 Winter Paralympics – Men's 10 kilometre classical =

Men's 10 kilometre at the XIV Paralympic Winter Games
- Paralympic cross-country skiing
- Venue: Tesero Cross-Country Skiing Stadium
- Dates: 11 March

Men's 10 kilometre (visually impaired) at the XIV Paralympic Winter Games
- Competitors: 15 from 11 nations

Medalists
1st place, gold medalist(s)		Jake Adicoff; Guide: Reid Goble	United States
2nd place, silver medalist(s)		Inkki Inola; Guide: Reetu Inkilä	Finland
3rd place, bronze medalist(s)		Zebastian Modin; Guide: Emil Talsi	Sweden

Men's 10 kilometre (standing) at the XIV Paralympic Winter Games
- Competitors: 25 from 16 nations

Medalists
1st place, gold medalist(s)		Karl Tabouret	France
2nd place, silver medalist(s)		Raman Svirydzenka	Belarus
3rd place, bronze medalist(s)		Mark Arendz	Canada

Men's 10 kilometre (sitting) at the XIV Paralympic Winter Games
- Competitors: 31 from 15 nations

Medalists
1st place, gold medalist(s)		Ivan Golubkov	Russia
2nd place, silver medalist(s)		Mao Zhongwu	China
3rd place, bronze medalist(s)		Zheng Peng	China

The men's 10 kilometre competition of the 2026 Winter Paralympics was held on 11 March 2026 at the Tesero Cross-Country Skiing Stadium.

== Medal table ==
Rank	Nation	Gold	Silver	Bronze	Total
1	France (FRA)	1	0	0	1
1	Russia (RUS)	1	0	0	1
1	United States (USA)	1	0	0	1
4	China (CHN)	0	1	1	2
5	Belarus (BLR)	0	1	0	1
5	Finland (FIN)	0	1	0	1
7	Canada (CAN)	0	0	1	1
7	Sweden (SWE)	0	0	1	1
Totals (8 entries)		3	3	3	9

== Visually impaired ==
In the cross-country skiing visually impaired, the athlete with a visual impairment has a sighted guide. The two skiers are considered a team, and dual medals are awarded.

Rank	Bib	Name	Country	Class	%	Real time	Delta	Result
1st place, gold medalist(s)	236	Jake Adicoff; Guide: Reid Goble	United States	NS3	100	28:03.6		28:03.6
2nd place, silver medalist(s)	232	Inkki Inola; Guide: Reetu Inkilä	Finland	NS3	100	29:52.3	+1:48.7	29:52.3
3rd place, bronze medalist(s)	235	Zebastian Modin; Guide: Emil Talsi	Sweden	NS1	88	34:14.4	+2:21.2	30:07.9
4	234	Yu Shuang; Guide: Shang Jincai	China	NS3	100	30:08.5	+2:04.9	30:08.5
5	231	Dmytro Suiarko; Guide: Oleksandr Nikonovych	Ukraine	NS3	100	30:17.7	+2:14.1	30:17.7
6	233	Thomas Oxaal; Guide: Geir Lervik	Norway	NS3	100	31:05.6	+3:02.0	31:05.6
7	228	Piotr Garbowski; Guide: Jakub Twardowski	Poland	NS3	100	31:36.0	+3:32.4	31:36.0
8	230	Theo Bold; Guide: Adrian Schuler	Germany	NS3	100	31:41.6	+3:38.0	31:41.6
9	229	Ihor Kravchuk; Guide: Andriy Dotsenko	Ukraine	NS3	100	32:32.2	+4:28.6	32:32.2
10	227	Endre Lykken; Guide: Lars Øvrebø	Norway	NS3	100	32:56.1	+4:52.5	32:56.1
11	226	Jesse Bachinsky; Guide: Levi Nadlersmith	Canada	NS1	88	38:59.8	+7:06.6	34:19.0
12	224	Logan Lariviere; Guide: Joseph Hutton	Canada	NS3	100	36:32.3	+8:28.7	36:32.3
13	223	Max Nelson; Guide: Gus Schatzlein	United States	NS3	100	37:09.2	+9:05.6	37:09.2
14	222	Kim Min-yeong; Guide: Byeon Ju-yeong	South Korea	NS3	100	37:24.7	+9:21.1	37:24.7
15	221	Alex Lajtman; Guide: Marko Havran	Slovakia	NS3	100	40:09.8	+12:06.2	40:09.8
	225	Ryohei Ariyasu; Guide: Yuhei Fujita	Japan	NS3	100	Did not start		

== Standing ==
Rank	Bib	Name	Country	Class	%	Real time	Delta	Result
1st place, gold medalist(s)	140	Karl Tabouret	France	LW3	86	31:36.2		27:10.7
2nd place, silver medalist(s)	138	Raman Svirydzenka	Belarus	LW4	97	28:29.7	+28.6	27:38.4
3rd place, bronze medalist(s)	141	Mark Arendz	Canada	LW6	90	31:05.9	+54.0	27:59.3
4	145	Taiki Kawayoke	Japan	LW5/7	81	35:15.6	+1:42.4	28:33.6
5	142	Witold Skupień	Poland	LW5/7	81	35:44.6	+2:11.4	28:57.1
6	136	Kjartan Haugen	Norway	LW4	97	30:15.9	+2:14.8	29:21.4
7	139	Yoshihiro Nitta	Japan	LW8	92	31:56.0	+2:23.5	29:22.7
8	133	Nurlan Alimov	Kazakhstan	LW6	90	32:41.5	+2:29.6	29:25.4
9	143	Wang Chenyang	China	LW5/7	81	37:02.6	+3:29.4	30:00.3
10	135	Vladislav Kobal	Kazakhstan	LW8	92	32:44.9	+3:12.4	30:07.7
11	134	Maximilian Weidner	Germany	LW8	92	33:14.4	+3:41.9	30:34.8
12	132	Jack Berry	United States	LW4	97	32:46.0	+4:44.9	31:47.0
13	124	Matěj Škoda	Czech Republic	LW8	92	34:54.9	+5:22.4	32:07.3
14	130	Keiichi Sato	Japan	LW8	92	35:12.7	+5:40.2	32:23.7
15	122	Garik Melkonyan	Armenia	LW6	90	36:42.4	+6:30.5	33:02.2
16	131	Stefan Egger-Riedmüller	Austria	LW4	97	34:17.8	+6:16.7	33:16.1
17	137	Huang Lingxin	China	LW5/7	81	41:04.9	+7:31.7	33:16.6
18	127	Wellington da Silva	Brazil	LW8	92	36:13.8	+6:41.3	33:19.9
19	128	Keigo Iwamoto	Japan	LW3	86	38:52.6	+7:16.4	33:26.0
20	129	Yuan Mingshou	China	LW5/7	81	42:19.4	+8:46.2	34:16.9
21	126	Batmönkhiin Ganbold	Mongolia	LW6	90	38:32.0	+8:20.1	34:40.8
22	125	Tsegmidiin Dashdorj	Mongolia	LW8	92	37:50.6	+8:18.1	34:49.0
23	123	Mattia Dal Pastro	Italy	LW6	90	38:48.5	+8:36.6	34:55.7
	121	Miroslav Motejzík	Czech Republic	LW4	97	Did not finish		
	144	Sebastian Marburger	Germany	LW2	92	Did not finish		

== Sitting ==
Rank	Bib	Name	Country	Class	%	Real time	Delta	Result
1st place, gold medalist(s)	57	Ivan Golubkov	Russia	LW11.5	96	25:06.0		24:05.8
2nd place, silver medalist(s)	59	Mao Zhongwu	China	LW11	93	26:12.2	+17.6	24:22.1
3rd place, bronze medalist(s)	58	Zheng Peng	China	LW11	93	26:14.7	+20.1	24:24.5
4	61	Giuseppe Romele	Italy	LW11.5	96	25:29.2	+23.2	24:28.0
5	60	Cristian Ribera	Brazil	LW11	93	26:21.8	+27.2	24:31.1
6	56	Collin Cameron	Canada	LW11.5	96	25:45.0	+39.0	24:43.2
7	53	Derek Zaplotinsky	Canada	LW10.5	87	29:01.1	+1:19.3	25:14.8
8	54	Yerbol Khamitov	Kazakhstan	LW12	100	25:27.4	+1:21.6	25:27.4
9	51	Shin Eui-hyun	South Korea	LW12	100	25:36.6	+1:30.8	25:36.6
10	50	Michele Biglione	Italy	LW12	100	25:38.6	+1:32.8	25:38.6
11	52	Daniel Cnossen	United States	LW12	100	26:04.3	+1:58.5	26:04.3
12	55	Liu Mengtao	China	LW12	100	26:06.1	+2:00.3	26:06.1
13	46	Jeong Jae-seok	South Korea	LW10.5	87	30:29.7	+2:47.9	26:31.8
14	47	Guilherme Rocha	Brazil	LW12	100	26:34.3	+2:28.5	26:34.3
15	43	Robelson Lula	Brazil	LW12	100	26:46.3	+2:40.5	26:46.3
16	44	Arnt-Christian Furuberg	Sweden	LW11.5	96	28:06.9	+3:00.9	26:59.4
17	48	Krzysztof Plewa	Poland	LW12	100	27:08.1	+3:02.3	27:08.1
18	45	Takaharu Minamoto	Japan	LW12	100	27:32.6	+3:26.8	27:32.6
19	41	Sergey Ussoltsev	Kazakhstan	LW12	100	27:50.2	+3:44.4	27:50.2
20	33	David Miln	Australia	LW12	100	28:20.3	+4:14.5	28:20.3
21	40	Yuriy Berezin	Kazakhstan	LW12	100	28:35.1	+4:29.3	28:35.1
22	49	Hiroaki Mori	Japan	LW12	100	29:02.4	+4:56.6	29:02.4
23	42	Giuseppe Spatola	Italy	LW12	100	29:03.2	+4:57.4	29:03.2
24	39	Nicolás Lima	Argentina	LW11.5	96	30:17.0	+5:11.0	29:04.3
25	37	Michael Kneeland	United States	LW11.5	96	30:48.1	+5:42.1	29:34.2
26	38	Leo Sammarelli	Canada	LW10	86	35:38.8	+7:37.6	30:39.4
27	35	David Chávez	El Salvador	LW10.5	87	35:33.4	+7:51.6	30:56.1
28	34	Omar Lorenzo	Argentina	LW11	93	34:43.0	+8:48.4	32:17.2
29	36	Temuri Dadiani	Georgia	LW12	100	33:05.7	+8:59.9	33:05.7
30	32	Jonathan Arias	El Salvador	LW10	86	39:04.4	+11:03.2	33:36.2
31	31	Matt Brumby	Australia	LW10	86	39:50.1	+11:48.9	34:15.5

== See also ==
- Cross-country skiing at the 2026 Winter Olympics
