= Para cross-country skiing at the 2026 Winter Paralympics – Men's sprint classical =

Men's sprint at the XIV Paralympic Winter Games
- Paralympic cross-country skiing
- Venue: Tesero Cross-Country Skiing Stadium
- Dates: 10 March

Men's sprint (visually impaired) at the XIV Paralympic Winter Games
- Competitors: 16 from 11 nations

Medalists
1st place, gold medalist(s)		Jake Adicoff; Guide: Peter Wolter	United States
2nd place, silver medalist(s)		Yu Shuang; Guide: Shang Jincai	China
3rd place, bronze medalist(s)		Zebastian Modin; Guide: Emil Talsi	Sweden

Men's sprint (standing) at the XIV Paralympic Winter Games
- Competitors: 30 from 18 nations

Medalists
1st place, gold medalist(s)		Raman Svirydzenka	Belarus
2nd place, silver medalist(s)		Sebastian Marburger	Germany
3rd place, bronze medalist(s)		Benjamin Daviet	France

Men's sprint (sitting) at the XIV Paralympic Winter Games
- Competitors: 37 from 16 nations

Medalists
1st place, gold medalist(s)		Liu Zixu	China
2nd place, silver medalist(s)		Cristian Ribera	Brazil
3rd place, bronze medalist(s)		Yerbol Khamitov	Kazakhstan

The men's sprint competition of the 2026 Winter Paralympics was held on 10 March 2026 at the Tesero Cross-Country Skiing Stadium.

== Medal table ==
Rank	Nation	Gold	Silver	Bronze	Total
1	China (CHN)	1	1	0	2
2	Belarus (BLR)	1	0	0	1
2	United States (USA)	1	0	0	1
4	Brazil (BRA)	0	1	0	1
4	Germany (GER)	0	1	0	1
6	France (FRA)	0	0	1	1
6	Kazakhstan (KAZ)	0	0	1	1
6	Sweden (SWE)	0	0	1	1
Totals (8 entries)		3	3	3	9

== Visually impaired ==
In the cross-country skiing visually impaired, the athlete with a visual impairment has a sighted guide. The two skiers are considered a team, and dual medals are awarded.

Rank	Bib	Name	Country	Class	%	Real time	Delta	Result	Notes
1	223	Yu Shuang; Guide: Shang Jincai	China	NS3	100	2:23.37		2:23.37	Q
2	221	Zebastian Modin; Guide: Emil Talsi	Sweden	NS1	88	2:45.61	+2.69	2:25.74	Q
3	222	Jake Adicoff; Guide: Peter Wolter	United States	NS3	100	2:27.58	+4.21	2:27.58	Q
4	224	Thomas Oxaal; Guide: Geir Lervik	Norway	NS3	100	2:29.91	+6.54	2:29.91	Q
5	227	Theo Bold; Guide: Jakob Bold	Germany	NS3	100	2:31.15	+7.78	2:31.15	Q
6	226	Dmytro Suiarko; Guide: Oleksandr Nikonovych	Ukraine	NS3	100	2:35.03	+11.66	2:35.03	Q
7	229	Piotr Garbowski; Guide: Jakub Twardowski	Poland	NS3	100	2:35.62	+12.25	2:35.62	Q
8	225	Inkki Inola; Guide: Reetu Inkilä	Finland	NS3	100	2:36.87	+13.50	2:36.87	Q
9	235	Błażej Bieńko; Guide: Michał Lańda	Poland	NS3	100	2:45.10	+21.73	2:45.10	
10	228	Ihor Kravchuk; Guide: Andriy Dotsenko	Ukraine	NS3	100	2:45.87	+22.50	2:45.87	
11	236	Kim Min-yeong; Guide: Byeon Ju-yeong	South Korea	NS3	100	3:03.04	+39.67	3:03.04	
12	233	Logan Lariviere; Guide: Joseph Hutton	Canada	NS3	100	3:05.24	+41.87	3:05.24	
13	230	Endre Lykken; Guide: Lars Øvrebø	Norway	NS3	100	3:06.71	+43.34	3:06.71	
14	234	Max Nelson; Guide: Gus Schatzlein	United States	NS3	100	3:11.23	+47.86	3:11.23	
15	231	Jesse Bachinsky; Guide: Levi Nadlersmith	Canada	NS1	88	3:42.58	+59.66	3:15.87	
16	237	Alex Lajtman; Guide: Marko Havran	Slovakia	NS3	100	3:51.71	+1:28.34	3:51.71	
	232	Ryohei Ariyasu; Guide: Yuhei Fujita	Japan	NS3	100	Did not start			

=== Semifinals ===
Semifinal 1

Rank	Bib	Name	Country	Class	Start	Time	Deficit	Notes
1	4	Thomas Oxaal; Guide: Geir Lervik	Norway	NS3	0:00	2:29.1		Q
2	1	Yu Shuang; Guide: Shang Jincai	China	NS3	0:00	2:29.5	+0.4	Q
3	5	Theo Bold; Guide: Jakob Bold	Germany	NS3	0:00	2:30.2	+1.1	
4	8	Inkki Inola; Guide: Reetu Inkilä	Finland	NS3	0:00	2:34.5	+5.4	

Semifinal 2

Rank	Bib	Name	Country	Class	Start	Time	Deficit	Notes
1	3	Jake Adicoff; Guide: Peter Wolter	United States	NS3	0:20	2:50.8		Q
2	2	Zebastian Modin; Guide: Emil Talsi	Sweden	NS1	0:00	2:51.1	+0.3	Q
3	6	Dmytro Suiarko; Guide: Oleksandr Nikonovych	Ukraine	NS3	0:20	2:57.4	+6.6	
4	7	Piotr Garbowski; Guide: Jakub Twardowski	Poland	NS3	0:20	3:05.3	+14.5	

=== Final ===
Rank	Bib	Name	Country	Class	Start	Time	Deficit
1st place, gold medalist(s)	3	Jake Adicoff; Guide: Peter Wolter	United States	NS3	0:20	2:44.7	
2nd place, silver medalist(s)	1	Yu Shuang; Guide: Shang Jincai	China	NS3	0:20	2:46.2	+1.5
3rd place, bronze medalist(s)	2	Zebastian Modin; Guide: Emil Talsi	Sweden	NS1	0:00	2:50.9	+6.2
4	4	Thomas Oxaal; Guide: Geir Lervik	Norway	NS3	0:20	2:56.5	+11.8

== Standing ==
=== Qualification ===
Rank	Bib	Name	Country	Class	%	Real time	Delta	Result	Notes
1	121	Sebastian Marburger	Germany	LW2	92	2:30.85		2:18.78	Q
2	134	Kjartan Haugen	Norway	LW4	97	2:28.02	+4.95	2:23.58	Q
3	122	Taiki Kawayoke	Japan	LW5/7	81	3:02.98	+11.65	2:28.21	Q
4	127	Karl Tabouret	France	LW3	86	2:53.15	+11.78	2:28.91	Q
5	128	Yoshihiro Nitta	Japan	LW8	92	2:42.25	+11.40	2:29.27	Q
6	132	Cai Jiayun	China	LW8	92	2:43.24	+12.39	2:30.18	Q
7	126	Mark Arendz	Canada	LW6	90	2:48.64	+14.44	2:31.78	Q
8	125	Serafym Drahun	Ukraine	LW8	92	2:47.01	+16.16	2:33.65	Q
9	133	Benjamin Daviet	France	LW2	92	2:47.72	+16.87	2:34.30	Q
10	124	Witold Skupień	Poland	LW5/7	81	3:11.51	+20.18	2:35.12	Q
11	139	Jack Berry	United States	LW4	97	2:41.87	+18.80	2:37.01	Q
12	129	Raman Svirydzenka	Belarus	LW4	97	2:42.42	+19.35	2:37.55	Q
13	138	Nurlan Alimov	Kazakhstan	LW6	90	2:55.11	+20.91	2:37.60	
14	141	Stefan Egger-Riedmüller	Austria	LW4	97	2:43.20	+20.13	2:38.30	
15	135	Vladislav Kobal	Kazakhstan	LW8	92	2:54.65	+23.80	2:40.68	
16	145	Batmönkhiin Ganbold	Mongolia	LW6	90	3:02.92	+28.72	2:44.63	
17	136	Alexander Ehler	Germany	LW4	97	2:49.94	+26.87	2:44.84	
18	131	Grygorii Vovchynskyi	Ukraine	LW8	92	3:01.23	+30.38	2:46.73	
19	144	Wellington da Silva	Brazil	LW8	92	3:02.92	+32.07	2:48.29	
20	142	Yuan Mingshou	China	LW5/7	81	3:30.66	+39.33	2:50.63	
21	130	Huang Lingxin	China	LW5/7	81	3:31.74	+40.41	2:51.51	
22	146	Tsegmidiin Dashdorj	Mongolia	LW8	92	3:06.72	+35.87	2:51.78	
23	123	Wang Chenyang	China	LW5/7	81	3:32.46	+41.13	2:52.09	
24	143	Keigo Iwamoto	Japan	LW3	86	3:21.18	+39.81	2:53.01	
25	137	Maximilian Weidner	Germany	LW8	92	3:08.93	+38.08	2:53.82	
26	140	Luca Tavasci	Switzerland	LW8	92	3:12.99	+42.14	2:57.55	
27	148	Mattia Dal Pastro	Italy	LW6	90	3:18.38	+44.18	2:58.54	
28	147	Matěj Škoda	Czech Republic	LW8	92	3:14.80	+43.95	2:59.22	
29	149	Garik Melkonyan	Armenia	LW6	90	3:20.50	+46.30	3:00.45	
30	150	Miroslav Motejzík	Czech Republic	LW4	97	3:28.47	+1:05.40	3:22.22	

=== Semifinals ===
Semifinal 1

Rank	Bib	Name	Country	Class	Start	Time	Deficit	Notes
1	12	Raman Svirydzenka	Belarus	LW4	0:19	2:50.5		Q
2	1	Sebastian Marburger	Germany	LW2	0:11	2:50.7	+0.2	Q
3	9	Benjamin Daviet	France	LW2	0:11	2:53.3	+2.8	Q
4	4	Karl Tabouret	France	LW3	0:00	2:54.4	+3.9	
5	5	Yoshihiro Nitta	Japan	LW8	0:11	2:58.0	+7.5	
6	8	Serafym Drahun	Ukraine	LW8	0:11	3:03.7	+13.2	

Semifinal 2

Rank	Bib	Name	Country	Class	Start	Time	Deficit	Notes
1	6	Cai Jiayun	China	LW8	0:20	3:06.5		Q
2	7	Mark Arendz	Canada	LW6	0:17	3:06.9	+0.4	Q
3	2	Kjartan Haugen	Norway	LW4	0:28	3:07.3	+0.8	Q
4	3	Taiki Kawayoke	Japan	LW5/7	0:00	3:07.8	+1.3	
5	11	Jack Berry	United States	LW4	0:28	3:10.3	+3.8	
6	10	Witold Skupień	Poland	LW5/7	0:00	3:22.5	+16.0	

=== Final ===
Rank	Bib	Name	Country	Class	Start	Time	Deficit
1st place, gold medalist(s)	12	Raman Svirydzenka	Belarus	LW4	0:11	2:35.4	
2nd place, silver medalist(s)	1	Sebastian Marburger	Germany	LW2	0:03	2:38.1	+2.7
3rd place, bronze medalist(s)	9	Benjamin Daviet	France	LW2	0:03	2:42.2	+6.8
4	6	Cai Jiayun	China	LW8	0:03	2:44.2	+8.8
5	2	Kjartan Haugen	Norway	LW4	0:11	2:44.9	+9.5
6	7	Mark Arendz	Canada	LW6	0:00	2:49.7	+14.3

== Sitting ==
=== Qualification ===
Rank	Bib	Name	Country	Class	%	Real time	Delta	Result	Notes
1	21	Cristian Ribera	Brazil	LW11	93	2:17.87		2:08.22	Q
2	26	Collin Cameron	Canada	LW11.5	96	2:16.37	+2.81	2:10.92	Q
3	23	Pavlo Bal	Ukraine	LW11.5	96	2:16.77	+3.21	2:11.30	Q
4	30	Wang Tao	China	LW12	100	2:13.52	+5.30	2:13.52	Q
5	31	Aaron Pike	United States	LW11	93	2:24.15	+6.28	2:14.06	Q
6	27	Yerbol Khamitov	Kazakhstan	LW12	100	2:14.47	+6.25	2:14.47	Q
7	24	Zheng Peng	China	LW11	93	2:26.15	+8.28	2:15.92	Q
8	32	Oleksandr Aleksyk	Ukraine	LW12	100	2:15.92	+7.70	2:15.92	Q
9	28	Taras Rad	Ukraine	LW12	100	2:15.98	+7.76	2:15.98	Q
10	29	Liu Zixu	China	LW12	100	2:16.28	+8.06	2:16.28	Q
11	40	Hryhorii Shymko	Ukraine	LW10.5	87	2:37.72	+10.34	2:17.22	Q
12	35	Vasyl Kravchuk	Ukraine	LW11	93	2:27.72	+9.85	2:17.38	Q
13	22	Giuseppe Romele	Italy	LW11.5	96	2:23.84	+10.28	2:18.09	
14	34	Joshua Sweeney	United States	LW12	100	2:19.61	+11.39	2:19.61	
15	33	Daniel Cnossen	United States	LW12	100	2:20.05	+11.83	2:20.05	
16	37	Michele Biglione	Italy	LW12	100	2:20.67	+12.45	2:20.67	
17	43	Arnt-Christian Furuberg	Sweden	LW11.5	96	2:27.84	+14.28	2:21.93	
18	39	Guilherme Rocha	Brazil	LW12	100	2:22.41	+14.19	2:22.41	
19	25	Ivan Golubkov	Russia	LW11.5	96	2:28.38	+14.82	2:22.44	
20	44	Robelson Lula	Brazil	LW12	100	2:25.01	+16.79	2:25.01	
21	36	Sin Eui-hyun	South Korea	LW12	100	2:25.04	+16.82	2:25.04	
22	41	Jeong Jae-seok	South Korea	LW10.5	87	2:47.56	+20.18	2:25.78	
23	38	Hiroaki Mori	Japan	LW12	100	2:26.48	+18.26	2:26.48	
24	46	Higinio Rivero	Spain	LW10.5	87	2:53.61	+26.23	2:31.04	
25	51	Marco Pisani	Italy	LW12	100	2:31.77	+23.55	2:31.77	
26	42	Takaharu Minamoto	Japan	LW12	100	2:32.58	+24.36	2:32.58	
27	53	David Chávez	El Salvador	LW10.5	87	2:56.66	+29.28	2:33.69	
28	55	David Miln	Australia	LW12	100	2:33.82	+25.60	2:33.82	
29	49	Leo Sammarelli	Canada	LW10	86	2:58.89	+29.80	2:33.85	
30	48	Nicolás Lima	Argentina	LW11.5	96	2:41.34	+27.78	2:34.89	
31	47	Yuriy Berezin	Kazakhstan	LW12	100	2:36.18	+27.96	2:36.18	
32	50	Michael Kneeland	United States	LW11.5	96	2:44.10	+30.54	2:37.54	
33	52	Temuri Dadiani	Georgia	LW12	100	2:40.68	+32.46	2:40.68	
34	45	Giuseppe Spatola	Italy	LW12	100	2:43.65	+35.43	2:43.65	
35	54	Omar Lorenzo	Argentina	LW11	93	3:05.95	+48.08	2:52.93	
36	56	Jonathan Arias	El Salvador	LW10	86	3:25.57	+56.48	2:56.79	
37	57	Matt Brumby	Australia	LW10	86	4:06.07	+1:36.98	3:31.62	

=== Semifinals ===
Semifinal 1

Rank	Bib	Name	Country	Class	Start	Time	Deficit	Notes
1	1	Cristian Ribera	Brazil	LW11	0:00	2:28.7		Q
2	4	Wang Tao	China	LW12	0:10	2:29.2	+0.5	Q
3	8	Oleksandr Aleksyk	Ukraine	LW12	0:10	2:30.7	+2.0	Q
4	9	Taras Rad	Ukraine	LW12	0:10	2:30.8	+2.1	
5	5	Aaron Pike	United States	LW11	0:00	2:31.4	+2.7	
6	12	Vasyl Kravchuk	Ukraine	LW11	0:00	2:37.5	+8.8	

Semifinal 2

Rank	Bib	Name	Country	Class	Start	Time	Deficit	Notes
1	6	Yerbol Khamitov	Kazakhstan	LW12	0:20	2:38.1		Q
2	3	Pavlo Bal	Ukraine	LW11.5	0:14	2:40.5	+2.4	Q
3	10	Liu Zixu	China	LW12	0:20	2:47.2	+9.1	Q
4	11	Hryhorii Shymko	Ukraine	LW10.5	0:00	2:51.3	+13.2	
5	7	Zheng Peng	China	LW11	0:10	3:10.3	+32.2	
6	2	Collin Cameron	Canada	LW11.5	0:14	RAL		

=== Final ===
Rank	Bib	Name	Country	Class	Start	Time	Deficit
1st place, gold medalist(s)	10	Liu Zixu	China	LW12	0:10	2:28.9	
2nd place, silver medalist(s)	1	Cristian Ribera	Brazil	LW11	0:00	2:29.6	+0.7
3rd place, bronze medalist(s)	6	Yerbol Khamitov	Kazakhstan	LW12	0:10	2:29.9	+1.0
4	8	Oleksandr Aleksyk	Ukraine	LW12	0:10	2:31.2	+2.3
5	3	Pavlo Bal	Ukraine	LW11.5	0:04	2:32.3	+3.4
6	4	Wang Tao	China	LW12	0:10	2:32.6	+3.7

== See also ==
- Cross-country skiing at the 2026 Winter Olympics
