= El Salvador at the 2026 Winter Paralympics =

- Flag of El Salvador
- IPC code: ESA
- NPC: Comité Paralímpico de El Salvador

in Milan and Cortina d'Ampezzo, Italy 6 March 2026 – 15 March 2026
- Competitors: 2 (2 men) in 1 sport
- Flag bearer (opening): David Chávez
- Flag bearer (closing): Volunteer
- Medals: Gold 0 Silver 0 Bronze 0 Total 0

Winter Paralympics appearances (overview)
- 2026

El Salvador will compete at the 2026 Winter Paralympics in Milan and Cortina d'Ampezzo, Italy, which will take place between 6–15 March 2026. This will be the nation's Winter Paralympic Games debut. El Salvador is also the only country not participating in the 2026 Winter Olympics that is participating in the 2026 Winter Paralympics.

== Competitors ==
The following is the list of number of competitors participating at the Games per sport/discipline.

Sport	Men	Women	Total
Para cross-country skiing	2	0	2
Total	2	0	2

== Para cross-country skiing ==
Athlete	Class	Event	Qualification		Semifinal		Final	
Athlete	Class	Event	Time	Rank	Time	Rank	Time	Rank
Jonathan Arias	LW10	Men's sprint, sitting	2:56.79	36	Did not advance			
Jonathan Arias	LW10	Men's 10 km, sitting	—N/a				33:36.2	30
David Chávez	LW10.5	Men's sprint, sitting	2:33.69	27	Did not advance			
David Chávez	LW10.5	Men's 10 km, sitting	—N/a				30:56.1	27
David Chávez	LW10.5	Men's 20 km, sitting	—N/a				1:07:24.6	29
