= Para cross-country skiing at the 2026 Winter Paralympics – Women's 20 kilometre freestyle =

Women's 20 kilometre at the XIV Paralympic Winter Games
- Paralympic cross-country skiing
- Venue: Tesero Cross-Country Skiing Stadium
- Dates: 15 March

Women's 20 kilometre (visually impaired) at the XIV Paralympic Winter Games
- Competitors: 10 from 7 nations

Medalists
1st place, gold medalist(s)		Anastasiia Bagiian; Guide: Sergei Siniakin	Russia
2nd place, silver medalist(s)		Simona Bubeníčková; Guide: David Šrůtek	Czech Republic
3rd place, bronze medalist(s)		Wang Yue; Guide: Chen Guoming	China

Women's 20 kilometre (standing) at the XIV Paralympic Winter Games
- Competitors: 14 from 9 nations

Medalists
1st place, gold medalist(s)		Sydney Peterson	United States
2nd place, silver medalist(s)		Vilde Nilsen	Norway
3rd place, bronze medalist(s)		Oleksandra Kononova	Ukraine

Women's 20 kilometre (sitting) at the XIV Paralympic Winter Games
- Competitors: 15 from 9 nations

Medalists
1st place, gold medalist(s)		Kim Yun-ji	South Korea
2nd place, silver medalist(s)		Anja Wicker	Germany
3rd place, bronze medalist(s)		Oksana Masters	United States

The women's 20 kilometre competition of the 2026 Winter Paralympics was held on 15 March 2026 at the Tesero Cross-Country Skiing Stadium.

== Medal table ==
Rank	Nation	Gold	Silver	Bronze	Total
1	United States (USA)	1	0	1	2
2	Russia (RUS)	1	0	0	1
2	South Korea (KOR)	1	0	0	1
4	Czech Republic (CZE)	0	1	0	1
4	Germany (GER)	0	1	0	1
4	Norway (NOR)	0	1	0	1
7	China (CHN)	0	0	1	1
7	Ukraine (UKR)	0	0	1	1
Totals (8 entries)		3	3	3	9

== Visually impaired ==
In the cross-country skiing visually impaired, the athlete with a visual impairment has a sighted guide. The two skiers are considered a team, and dual medals are awarded.

Rank	Bib	Name	Country	Class	%	Real time	Delta	Result
1st place, gold medalist(s)	209	Anastasiia Bagiian; Guide: Sergei Siniakin	Russia	NS1	88	49:59.0		43:59.1
2nd place, silver medalist(s)	213	Simona Bubeníčková; Guide: David Šrůtek	Czech Republic	NS1	88	53:55.4	+3:56.4	47:27.2
3rd place, bronze medalist(s)	212	Wang Yue; Guide: Chen Guoming	China	NS2	97	50:29.6	+5:08.9	48:58.7
4	205	Cong Jihong; Guide: Liu Jiaxuan	China	NS3	100	52:50.5	+8:51.4	52:50.5
5	211	Linn Kazmaier; Guide: Florian Baumann	Germany	NS3	100	54:12.2	+10:13.1	54:12.2
6	208	Oksana Shyshkova; Guide: Artem Kazarian	Ukraine	NS3	100	54:22.3	+10:23.2	54:22.3
7	204	Romana Lobasheva; Guide: Anastasiia Shabaldina	Ukraine	NS3	100	55:43.8	+11:44.7	55:43.8
8	206	Aneta Kobryń; Guide: Bartłomiej Puto	Poland	NS2	97	59:20.5	+13:59.8	57:33.7
9	202	Yang Qianru; Guide: Wang Guanyu	China	NS3	100	1:00:39.6	+16:40.5	1:00:39.6
10	203	Kotoha Matsudo; Guide: Yuji Shimada	Japan	NS3	100	1:11:11.4	+27:12.3	1:11:11.4
	201	Anna Grachova; Guide: Yermek Ormantayev	Kazakhstan	NS3	100	Did not start		
	207	Maddie Mullin; Guide: Brooke Ailey	Canada	NS3	100	Did not start		
	210	Johanna Recktenwald; Guide: Adrian Schuler	Germany	NS2	97	Did not start		

== Standing ==
Rank	Bib	Name	Country	Class	%	Real time	Delta	Result
1st place, gold medalist(s)	116	Sydney Peterson	United States	LW9	89	53:17.5		47:25.8
2nd place, silver medalist(s)	117	Vilde Nilsen	Norway	LW4	96	50:41.4	+1:17.0	48:39.7
3rd place, bronze medalist(s)	112	Oleksandra Kononova	Ukraine	LW8	96	50:45.2	+1:20.8	48:43.4
4	114	Liudmyla Liashenko	Ukraine	LW8	96	51:20.3	+1:55.9	49:17.1
5	109	Iryna Buy	Ukraine	LW8	96	52:18.2	+2:53.8	50:12.7
6	115	Natalie Wilkie	Canada	LW8	96	53:26.2	+4:01.8	51:18.0
7	110	Danielle Aravich	United States	LW8	96	53:37.2	+4:12.8	51:28.5
8	113	Zhao Zhiqing	China	LW5/7	90	57:45.8	+5:03.8	51:59.2
9	106	Bohdana Konashuk	Ukraine	LW8	96	54:47.9	+5:23.5	52:36.4
10	108	Kathrin Marchand	Germany	LW9	89	1:04:39.5	+11:22.0	57:32.8
11	103	Momoko Dekijima	Japan	LW6	95	1:01:34.1	+11:38.5	58:29.4
12	101	Darya Fedzkovich	Belarus	LW4	96	1:02:12.1	+12:47.7	59:42.8
13	102	Mika Iwamoto	Japan	LW8	96	1:05:10.5	+15:46.1	1:02:34.1
13	104	Alice Morelius	Sweden	LW8	96	1:05:10.5	+15:46.1	1:02:34.1
	105	Ellen Westerlund	Sweden	LW9	89	Did not start		
	107	Emma Archibald	Canada	LW5/7	90	Did not start		
	111	Brittany Hudak	Canada	LW8	96	Did not start		

== Sitting ==
Rank	Bib	Name	Country	Class	%	Real time	Delta	Result
1st place, gold medalist(s)	12	Kim Yun-ji	South Korea	LW10.5	87	1:07:06.8		58:23.3
2nd place, silver medalist(s)	14	Anja Wicker	Germany	LW10	86	1:08:56.5	+1:02.9	59:17.4
3rd place, bronze medalist(s)	15	Oksana Masters	United States	LW12	100	59:34.5	+1:11.2	59:34.5
4	13	Kendall Gretsch	United States	LW11.5	96	1:03:58.4	+3:09.1	1:01:24.9
5	11	Aline Rocha	Brazil	LW10.5	87	1:10:41.6	+3:34.8	1:01:30.2
6	10	Wang Shiyu	China	LW12	100	1:04:24.8	+6:01.5	1:04:24.8
7	9	Zhai Yuxin	China	LW12	100	1:05:05.3	+6:42.0	1:05:05.3
8	3	Lidziya Loban	Belarus	LW12	100	1:07:22.3	+8:59.0	1:07:22.3
9	7	Indira Liseth	Norway	LW10.5	87	1:18:39.0	+11:32.2	1:08:25.5
10	1	Lauren Parker	Australia	LW10	86	1:19:53.9	+12:00.3	1:08:42.8
11	8	Christina Picton	Canada	LW12	100	1:10:53.8	+12:30.5	1:10:53.8
12	4	Nicole Zaino	United States	LW11.5	96	1:14:49.5	+14:00.2	1:11:49.9
13	6	Valiantsina Biryla	Belarus	LW10.5	87	1:24:39.6	+17:32.8	1:13:39.3
14	5	Elena de Sena	Brazil	LW12	100	1:19:04.9	+20:41.6	1:19:04.9
15	2	Lyne-Marie Bilodeau	Canada	LW12	100	1:20:51.2	+22:27.9	1:20:51.2

== See also ==
- Cross-country skiing at the 2026 Winter Olympics
