= Germany at the 2026 Winter Paralympics =

- Flag of Germany
- IPC code: GER
- NPC: National Paralympic Committee Germany
- Website: www.dbs-npc.de

in Milan & Cortina d'Ampezzo, Italy 6 March 2026 – 15 March 2026
- Competitors: 40 (29 men and 11 women) in 5 sports
- Flag bearers (opening): Anna-Lena Forster & Jörg Wedde
- Flag bearers (closing): Andrea Rothfuss & Christian Schmiedt
- Medals Ranked 11th: Gold 2 Silver 6 Bronze 9 Total 17

Winter Paralympics appearances (overview)
- 1976; 1980; 1984; 1988; 1992; 1994; 1998; 2002; 2006; 2010; 2014; 2018; 2022; 2026

Germany will compete at the 2026 Winter Paralympics in Milan & Cortina d'Ampezzo, Italy, which will take place between 6–15 March 2026.

== Medalists ==
The following German competitors won medals at the games. In the discipline sections below, the medalists' names are bolded.

Medals by sport
Sport	1st place, gold medalist(s)	2nd place, silver medalist(s)	3rd place, bronze medalist(s)	Total
Para alpine skiing	2	1	0	**3**
Para cross-country skiing	0	4	1	**5**
Para biathlon	0	1	8	**9**
Total	2	6	9	17

Medals by date
Day	Date	1st place, gold medalist(s)	2nd place, silver medalist(s)	3rd place, bronze medalist(s)	Total
Day 1	7 March	1	0	3	4
Day 2	8 March	0	1	2	3
Day 3	9 March	0	0	0	0
Day 4	10 March	0	3	0	3
Day 5	11 March	0	0	1	1
Day 6	12 March	1	0	0	1
Day 7	13 March	0	0	3	3
Day 8	14 March	0	1	0	1
Day 9	15 March	0	1	0	1
Total		2	6	9	17

Medals by gender
Gender	1st place, gold medalist(s)	2nd place, silver medalist(s)	3rd place, bronze medalist(s)	Total
Female	2	4	6	**12**
Male	0	1	3	**4**
Mixed	0	1	0	**1**
Total	2	6	9	17

Multiple medalists
Name	Sport	1st place, gold medalist(s)	2nd place, silver medalist(s)	3rd place, bronze medalist(s)	Total
Anna-Lena Forster	Para alpine skiing	2	1	0	3
Linn Kazmaier	Para cross-country skiing	0	2	0	2
Sebastian Marburger	Para cross-country skiing	0	2	0	2
Marco Maier	Para biathlon	0	1	3	4
Marco Maier	Para cross-country skiing	0	1	3	4
Anja Wicker	Para biathlon	0	2	2	4
Anja Wicker	Para cross-country skiing	0	2	2	4
Leonie Walter	Para biathlon	0	0	3	3
Leonie Walter	Para cross-country skiing	0	0	3	3

Medal	Name	Sport	Event	Date
Gold	Anna-Lena Forster	Para alpine skiing	Women's downhill, sitting	7 March
Gold	Anna-Lena Forster	Para alpine skiing	Women's giant slalom, sitting	12 March
Silver	Anja Wicker	Para biathlon	Women's individual, sitting	8 March
Silver	Anna-Lena Forster	Para alpine skiing	Women's super combined, sitting	10 March
Silver	Sebastian Marburger	Para cross-country skiing	Men's sprint classical, standing	10 March
Silver	Linn Kazmaier; Guide: Florian Baumann	Para cross-country skiing	Women's sprint classical, visually impaired	10 March
Silver	Theo Bold; Guide: Jakob Bold; Sebastian Marburger; Linn Kazmaier; Guide: Florian Baumann; Marco Maier	Para cross-country skiing	Open 4 × 2.5 kilometre relay	14 March
Silver	Anja Wicker	Para cross-country skiing	Women's 20 kilometre, sitting	15 March
Bronze	Anja Wicker	Para biathlon	Women's sprint, sitting	7 March
Bronze	Marco Maier	Para biathlon	Men's sprint, standing	7 March
Bronze	Leonie Walter; Guide: Christian Krasman	Para biathlon	Women's sprint, visually impaired	7 March
Bronze	Marco Maier	Para biathlon	Men's individual, standing	8 March
Bronze	Johanna Recktenwald; Guide: Emily Weiss	Para biathlon	Women's individual, visually impaired	8 March
Bronze	Leonie Walter; Guide: Christian Krasman	Para cross-country skiing	Women's 10 kilometre classical, visually impaired	11 March
Bronze	Anja Wicker	Para biathlon	Women's sprint pursuit, sitting	13 March
Bronze	Marco Maier	Para biathlon	Men's sprint pursuit, standing	13 March
Bronze	Leonie Walter; Guide: Christian Krasman	Para biathlon	Women's sprint pursuit, visually impaired	13 March

== Competitors ==
The following is the list of number of competitors participating at the Games per sport/discipline.

Sport	Men	Women	Total
Para alpine skiing	3	4	7
Para biathlon	8	7	15
Para cross-country skiing	8	7	15
Para ice hockey	17	0	17
Para snowboard	1	0	1
Total	29	11	40

== Para alpine skiing ==
Germany qualified 6 athletes, 3 men and 3 women, for the para alpine skiing events.

Men

Athlete	Class	Event	Run 1		Run 2		Total	
Athlete	Class	Event	Time	Rank	Time	Rank	Time	Rank
Leon Gensert	LW12-1	Giant slalom, sitting	DNF					
Leon Gensert	LW12-1	Slalom, sitting	59.32	19	DNF			
Christoph Glötzner	LW2	Giant slalom, standing	DNF					
Christoph Glötzner	LW2	Slalom, standing	49.46	9	45.47	8	1:34.93	7
Christoph Glötzner	LW2	Super combined, standing	DNF					
Alexander Rauen; Guide: Jeremias Wilke	AS4	Super-G, visually impaired	—N/a				1:23.41	11
Alexander Rauen; Guide: Jeremias Wilke	AS4	Giant slalom, visually impaired	1:14.23	12	1:16.08	10	2:30.31	11
Alexander Rauen; Guide: Jeremias Wilke	AS4	Slalom, visually impaired	54.28	9	50.57	9	1:44.85	9
Alexander Rauen; Guide: Jeremias Wilke	AS4	Super combined, visually impaired	1:27.12	11	48.16	7	2:15.28	11

Women

Athlete	Class	Event	Run 1		Run 2		Total	
Athlete	Class	Event	Time	Rank	Time	Rank	Time	Rank
Anna-Lena Forster	LW12-1	Downhill, sitting	—N/a				1:25.79	1st place, gold medalist(s)
Anna-Lena Forster	LW12-1	Super-G, sitting	—N/a				DNF	
Anna-Lena Forster	LW12-1	Giant slalom, sitting	1:15.12	1	1:15.52	1	2:30.64	1st place, gold medalist(s)
Anna-Lena Forster	LW12-1	Slalom, sitting	44.60	4	43.52	1	1:28.12	4
Anna-Lena Forster	LW12-1	Super combined, sitting	1:24.70	2	46.98	2	2:11.68	2nd place, silver medalist(s)
Maya Fügenschuh; Guide: Johanna Holzmann	AS3	Giant slalom, visually impaired	1:27.26	11	1:27.82	9	2:55.08	9
Maya Fügenschuh; Guide: Johanna Holzmann	AS3	Slalom, visually impaired	51.15	10	51.97	10	1:43.12	10
Anna-Maria Rieder	LW9-1	Super-G, standing	—N/a				1:24.28	11
Anna-Maria Rieder	LW9-1	Giant slalom, standing	1:15.28	7	1:16.68	5	2:31.96	7
Anna-Maria Rieder	LW9-1	Slalom, standing	45.45	7	44.87	4	1:30.32	6
Anna-Maria Rieder	LW9-1	Super combined, standing	1:28.60	12	47.35	2	2:15.95	11
Andrea Rothfuss	LW6/8-2	Super-G, standing	—N/a				1:18.95	4
Andrea Rothfuss	LW6/8-2	Giant slalom, standing	1:13.69	4	1:14.04	3	2:27.73	4
Andrea Rothfuss	LW6/8-2	Slalom, standing	45.87	9	46.37	7	1:32.24	7
Andrea Rothfuss	LW6/8-2	Super combined, standing	1:23.24	8	49.07	5	2:12.31	6

== Para biathlon ==
Germany qualified 14 athletes, 7 men and 7 women, for the para biathlon and para cross-country skiing events.

Men

Athlete	Class	Event	Qualification			Final		
Athlete	Class	Event	Missed shots	Time	Rank	Missed shots	Time	Rank
Theo Bold; Guide: Jakob Bold	NS3	Sprint, visually impaired	—N/a			2 (0+2)	20:56.0	11
Alexander Ehler	LW4	Individual, standing	—N/a			1 (0+0+0+1)	33:25.5	11
Alexander Ehler	LW4	Sprint, standing	—N/a			0 (0+0)	18:47.2	9
Steffen Lehmker	LW6	Individual, standing	—N/a			2 (0+0+1+1)	35:14.2	13
Steffen Lehmker	LW6	Sprint, standing	—N/a			1 (1+0)	19:52.3	13
Steffen Lehmker	LW6	Sprint pursuit, standing	7 (2+5)	12:46.0	18 Q	DNS		
Marco Maier	LW8	Individual, standing	—N/a			1 (0+0+1+0)	31:07.3	3rd place, bronze medalist(s)
Marco Maier	LW8	Sprint, standing	—N/a			0 (0+0)	17:42.4	3rd place, bronze medalist(s)
Marco Maier	LW8	Sprint pursuit, standing	0 (0+0)	9:53.5	1 Q	3 (2+1)	11:08.5	3rd place, bronze medalist(s)
Nico Messinger; Guide: Robin Wunderle	NS2	Individual, visually impaired	—N/a			5 (0+0+3+2)	37:54.8	8
Nico Messinger; Guide: Robin Wunderle	NS2	Sprint, visually impaired	—N/a			4 (0+4)	21:51.9	13
Nico Messinger; Guide: Robin Wunderle	NS2	Sprint pursuit, visually impaired	5 (1+4)	12:30.4	11 Q	DNS		
Lennart Volkert; Guide: Nils Kolb	NS2	Individual, visually impaired	—N/a			7 (2+2+1+2)	39:46.6	10
Lennart Volkert; Guide: Nils Kolb	NS2	Sprint, visually impaired	—N/a			1 (1+0)	20:23.5	8
Lennart Volkert; Guide: Nils Kolb	NS2	Sprint pursuit, visually impaired	1 (0+1)	10:53.7	6 Q	1 (0+1)	12:51.5	4

Women

Athlete	Class	Event	Qualification			Final		
Athlete	Class	Event	Missed shots	Time	Rank	Missed shots	Time	Rank
Andrea Eskau	LW11	Individual, sitting	—N/a			DSQ		
Andrea Eskau	LW11	Sprint, sitting	—N/a			0 (0+0)	23:50.7	8
Andrea Eskau	LW11	Sprint pursuit, sitting	1 (1+0)	10:45.3	4 Q	2 (2+0)	14:26.6	7
Linn Kazmaier; Guide: Florian Baumann	NS3	Individual, visually impaired	—N/a			1 (0+0+1+0)	41:36.2	6
Linn Kazmaier; Guide: Florian Baumann	NS3	Sprint, visually impaired	—N/a			0 (0+0)	22:58.3	7
Linn Kazmaier; Guide: Florian Baumann	NS3	Sprint pursuit, visually impaired	0 (0+0)	12:37.2	5 Q	1 (0+1)	14:56.4	6
Johanna Recktenwald; Guide: Emily Weiss	NS2	Individual, visually impaired	—N/a			0 (0+0+0+0)	37:05.2	3rd place, bronze medalist(s)
Johanna Recktenwald; Guide: Emily Weiss	NS2	Sprint, visually impaired	—N/a			0 (0+0)	21:17.8	5
Johanna Recktenwald; Guide: Emily Weiss	NS2	Sprint pursuit, visually impaired	1 (0+1)	12:40.8	6 Q	1 (0+1)	14:44.0	5
Leonie Walter; Guide: Christian Krasman	NS2	Individual, visually impaired	—N/a			2 (0+0+1+1)	38:55.4	5
Leonie Walter; Guide: Christian Krasman	NS2	Sprint, visually impaired	—N/a			0 (0+0)	20:32.2	3rd place, bronze medalist(s)
Leonie Walter; Guide: Christian Krasman	NS2	Sprint pursuit, visually impaired	1 (0+1)	12:18.8	3 Q	1 (0+1)	13:59.2	3rd place, bronze medalist(s)
Anja Wicker	LW10	Individual, sitting	—N/a			1 (1+0+0+0)	38:12.9	2nd place, silver medalist(s)
Anja Wicker	LW10	Sprint, sitting	—N/a			2 (1+1)	22:32.4	3rd place, bronze medalist(s)
Anja Wicker	LW10	Sprint pursuit, sitting	4 (4+0)	10:45.3	4 Q	0 (0+0)	12:39.1	3rd place, bronze medalist(s)

== Para cross-country skiing ==
Men

Athlete	Class	Event	Qualification		Semifinal		Final	
Athlete	Class	Event	Time	Rank	Time	Rank	Time	Rank
Theo Bold; Guide: Jakob Bold (sprint); Guide: Adrian Schuler (10 km classical)	NS3	Sprint classical, visually impaired	2:31.15	5 Q	2:30.2	3	Did not advance	
Theo Bold; Guide: Jakob Bold (sprint); Guide: Adrian Schuler (10 km classical)	NS3	10 km classical, visually impaired	—N/a				31:41.6	8
Alexander Ehler	LW4	Sprint classical, standing	2:44.84	17	Did not advance			
Marco Maier	LW8	20 km freestyle, standing	—N/a				44:28.6	7
Sebastian Marburger	LW2	Sprint classical, standing	2:18.78	1 Q	2:50.7	2 Q	2:38.1	2nd place, silver medalist(s)
Sebastian Marburger	LW2	10 km classical, standing	—N/a				DNF	
Lennart Volkert; Guide: Nils Kolb	NS2	20 km freestyle, visually impaired	—N/a				43:30.1	4
Maximilian Weidner	LW8	Sprint classical, standing	2:53.82	25	Did not advance			
Maximilian Weidner	LW8	10 km classical, standing	—N/a				33:14.4	11

Women

Athlete	Class	Event	Qualification		Semifinal		Final	
Athlete	Class	Event	Time	Rank	Time	Rank	Time	Rank
Andrea Eskau	LW11	Sprint, sitting	2:45.47	7 Q	3:15.4	3 Q	3:19.8	4
Andrea Eskau	LW11	10 km, sitting	—N/a				29:46.3	10
Linn Kazmaier; Guide: Florian Baumann	NS3	Sprint classical, visually impaired	3:03.79	3 Q	3:29.4	2 Q	3:25.3	2nd place, silver medalist(s)
Linn Kazmaier; Guide: Florian Baumann	NS3	10 km classical, visually impaired	—N/a				37:53.7	5
Linn Kazmaier; Guide: Florian Baumann	NS3	20 km freestyle, visually impaired	—N/a				54:12.2	5
Kathrin Marchand	LW9	Sprint classical, standing	2:54.93	3 Q	3:44.2	2 Q	3:42.1	4
Kathrin Marchand	LW9	10 km classical, standing	—N/a				DNF	
Kathrin Marchand	LW9	20 km freestyle, standing	—N/a				57:32.8	10
Merle Menje	LW11	Sprint, sitting	2:55.83	15	Did not advance			
Leonie Walter; Guide: Christian Krasman	NS2	Sprint classical, visually impaired	3:06.15	4 Q	3:21.2	1 Q	RAL	4
Leonie Walter; Guide: Christian Krasman	NS2	10 km classical, visually impaired	—N/a				35:30.8	3rd place, bronze medalist(s)
Anja Wicker	LW10	Sprint, sitting	2:37.91	4 Q	3:12.5	2 Q	3:24.7	6
Anja Wicker	LW10	10 km, sitting	—N/a				27:29.1	4
Anja Wicker	LW10	20 km, sitting	—N/a				59:17.4	2nd place, silver medalist(s)

Relay

Athletes	Event	Time	Rank
Nico Messinger; Guide: Robin Wunderle; Anja Wicker; Leonie Walter; Guide: Christian Krasman; Lennart Volkert; Guide: Nils Kolb	4 × 2.5km mixed relay	24:10.4	4
Theo Bold; Guide: Jakob Bold; Sebastian Marburger; Linn Kazmaier; Guide: Florian Baumann; Marco Maier	4 × 2.5km open relay	21:59.8	2nd place, silver medalist(s)

== Para ice hockey ==
Germany qualified a para ice hockey team by virtue of finishing in the top 5 of the 2025 World Para Ice Hockey Championships in Buffalo, United States.

Summary

Key:

- OT – Overtime
- GWS – Match decided by penalty-shootout

Team	Event	Group stage				Semifinal / Cl.	Final / BM / Pl.	
Team	Event	Opposition Score	Opposition Score	Opposition Score	Rank	Opposition Score	Opposition Score	Rank
Germany	Mixed tournament	China; L 0–12	United States; L 0–13	Italy; L 1–2	4	Slovakia; W 4–3 (OT)	Italy; L 2–5	6

Roster

Head coach: Peter Willmann

- Steven Betz
- Malte Brelage
- Jano Bußmann
- Sebastian Disveld
- Bernhard Hering
- Christian Jaster
- Ingo Kuhli-Lauenstein
- Simon Kunst
- Marcel Malchin
- Veit Mühlhans
- Christian Pilz
- Hugo Rädler
- Leopold Reimann
- Frank Rennhack
- Felix Schrader
- Sven Stumpe
- Jörg Wedde

Group play

Pos	Team	Pld	W	OTW	OTL	L	GF	GA	GD	Pts	Qualification
1	United States	3	3	0	0	0	34	2	+32	9	Semifinals
2	China	3	2	0	0	1	24	8	+16	6	Semifinals
3	Italy (H)	3	1	0	0	2	4	26	−22	3	5–8th place semifinals
4	Germany	3	0	0	0	3	1	27	−26	0	5–8th place semifinals

Source: Milano Cortina 2026
(H) Host

7 March 2026; 13:35	China	12–0 (5–0, 3–0, 4–0)	Germany	PalaItalia, Milan; Attendance: 2,787

Game reference

Ji Yanzhao
Goalies
Simon Kunst
Referee:
(Canada) Matthew Fergenbaum
Linesmen:
(United States) Brendan Lewis
(Italy) Alexander Wiest

Wang Z. (Shen, Zhu) – 06:16	1–0
Wang Z. (Shen, Lyu) – 08:44	2–0
Qiu (Wang Z., Zhu) (PP) – 12:42	3–0
Tian (Wang J.) – 12:54	4–0
Tian (Li, Lyu) – 14:32	5–0
Qiu (Shen, Wang Z.) – 20:34	6–0
Qiu (PP) – 28:34	7–0
Chen (Lyu, Wang J.) – 29:39	8–0
Tian (Song) – 32:56	9–0
Liu (Shen, Zhu) – 33:30	10–0
Liu (Zhu, Li) – 34:46	11–0
Li (Song, Lyu) – 35:40	12–0

6 min
Penalties
6 min
36
Shots
5

9 March 2026; 17:05	Germany	0–13 (0–6, 0–5, 0–2)	United States	PalaItalia, Milan; Attendance: 1,284

Game reference

Veit Mühlhans
Goalies
Griffin LaMarre
Referee:
(Canada) Matthew Fergenbaum
Linesmen:
(Sweden) Tony Rundström
(Italy) Alexander Wiest

0–1	00:58 – Farmer (Roybal)
0–2	02:52 – Farmer (Jones, Grove)
0–3	06:31 – Farmer (Pauls, Grove)
0–4	07:02 – Eustace (Dodson, Wallace)
0–5	09:44 – Eustace (Wallace, Utkhe) (PP)
0–6	14:32 – Beasley (Jones, Nichols)
0–7	18:10 – Bolton (Farmer, Wallace)
0–8	18:29 – Wallace (Farmer, Utkhe)
0–9	19:21 – Eustace
0–10	21:20 – Farmer (Roybal, Bolton)
0–11	21:42 – Bolton (Farmer, Wallace)
0–12	32:44 – Beasley (Nichols)
0–13	38:10 – Wallace

2 min
Penalties
2 min
1
Shots
41

10 March 2026; 10:05	Italy	2–1 (1–1, 1–0, 0–0)	Germany	PalaItalia, Milan; Attendance: 4,873

Game reference

Julian Kasslatter
Goalies
Simon Kunst
Referee:
(Czech Republic) Jan Vaněk
Linesmen:
(Czech Republic) Pavel Blažek
(Italy) Alexander Wiest

	0–1	02:40 – Bußmann (Kuhli-Lauenstein, Stumpe)
Larch (Rosa, Landeros) (PP) – 11:55	1–1
Landeros (Kalegaris, Macri) – 18:31	2–1

4 min
Penalties
8 min
24
Shots
12

5–8th place semifinal

12 March 2026; 14:35	Slovakia	3–4 OT (1–2, 2–0, 0–1) (OT: 0–1)	Germany	PalaItalia, Milan; Attendance: 3,376

Game reference

Eduard Lepáček
Goalies
Veit Mühlhans
Referee:
(Czech Republic) Jan Vaněk
Linesmen:
(United States) Brendan Lewis
(Italy) Alexander Wiest

	0–1	01:20 – Schrader (Stumpe)
	0–2	08:07 – Schrader
Ferenčík (Joppa, Ligda) – 12:02	1–2
Večerek – 15:38	2–2
Joppa (Korman, Ligda) – 28:56	3–2
	3–3	41:11 – Schrader (Brelage, Disveld)
	3–4	51:04 – Schrader

0 min
Penalties
18 min
25
Shots
14

Fifth place game

14 March 2026; 16:05	Italy	5–2 (0–1, 2–1, 3–0)	Germany	PalaItalia, Milan; Attendance: 6,495

Game reference

Santino Stillitano
Goalies
Simon Kunst
Referee:
(Canada) Matthew Fergenbaum
Linesmen:
(Serbia) Tibor Fazekas
(Norway) Marius Hermansen Oswold

	0–1	09:09 – Hering (Schrader, Rädler) (PP)
Landeros (Enderle, Rosa) – 17:54	1–1
	1–2	21:08 – Hering
Depaoli (Rosa) (PP) – 26:56	2–2
Landeros (Depaoli, Rosa) – 37:05	3–2
Rosa (Macri, Kalegaris) – 38:05	4–2
Rosa (Larch, Macri) – 42:53	5–2

18 min
Penalties
24 min
25
Shots
11

== Para snowboard ==
Germany qualified one male athlete for the para snowboard events.

Banked slalom

Athlete	Event	Run 1	Run 2	Best	Rank
Christian Schmiedt	Men's banked slalom, SB-LL1	1:07.43	~~1:07.79~~	1:07.43	10

Snowboard cross

Athlete	Event	Seeding		Quarterfinal	Semifinal	Final	
Athlete	Event	Time	Rank	Position	Position	Position	Rank
Christian Schmiedt	Men's snowboard cross, SB-LL1	56.15	9	3	Did not advance		

== See also ==
- Germany at the Paralympics
- Germany at the 2026 Winter Olympics
