= Para cross-country skiing at the 2026 Winter Paralympics – Women's 10 kilometre classical =

Women's 10 kilometre at the XIV Paralympic Winter Games
- Paralympic cross-country skiing
- Venue: Tesero Cross-Country Skiing Stadium
- Dates: 11 March

Women's 10 kilometre (visually impaired) at the XIV Paralympic Winter Games
- Competitors: 11 from 9 nations

Medalists
1st place, gold medalist(s)		Anastasiia Bagiian; Guide: Sergei Siniakin	Russia
2nd place, silver medalist(s)		Simona Bubeníčková; Guide: David Šrůtek	Czech Republic
3rd place, bronze medalist(s)		Leonie Walter; Guide: Christian Krasman	Germany

Women's 10 kilometre (standing) at the XIV Paralympic Winter Games
- Competitors: 12 from 8 nations

Medalists
1st place, gold medalist(s)		Sydney Peterson	United States
2nd place, silver medalist(s)		Vilde Nilsen	Norway
3rd place, bronze medalist(s)		Brittany Hudak	Canada

Women's 10 kilometre (sitting) at the XIV Paralympic Winter Games
- Competitors: 19 from 11 nations

Medalists
1st place, gold medalist(s)		Oksana Masters	United States
2nd place, silver medalist(s)		Kim Yun-ji	South Korea
3rd place, bronze medalist(s)		Kendall Gretsch	United States

The women's 10 kilometre competition of the 2026 Winter Paralympics was held on 11 March 2026 at the Tesero Cross-Country Skiing Stadium.

== Medal table ==
Rank	Nation	Gold	Silver	Bronze	Total
1	United States (USA)	2	0	1	3
2	Russia (RUS)	1	0	0	1
3	Czech Republic (CZE)	0	1	0	1
3	Norway (NOR)	0	1	0	1
3	South Korea (KOR)	0	1	0	1
6	Canada (CAN)	0	0	1	1
6	Germany (GER)	0	0	1	1
Totals (7 entries)		3	3	3	9

== Visually impaired ==
In the cross-country skiing visually impaired, the athlete with a visual impairment has a sighted guide. The two skiers are considered a team, and dual medals are awarded.

Rank	Bib	Name	Country	Class	%	Real time	Delta	Result
1st place, gold medalist(s)	208	Anastasiia Bagiian; Guide: Sergei Siniakin	Russia	NS1	88	33:42.4		29:39.7
2nd place, silver medalist(s)	211	Simona Bubeníčková; Guide: David Šrůtek	Czech Republic	NS1	88	36:20.8	+2:38.4	31:59.1
3rd place, bronze medalist(s)	209	Leonie Walter; Guide: Christian Krasman	Germany	NS2	97	36:36.7	+6:02.0	35:30.8
4	205	Cong Jihong; Guide: Liu Jiaxuan	China	NS3	100	36:28.1	+6:48.4	36:28.1
5	210	Linn Kazmaier; Guide: Florian Baumann	Germany	NS3	100	37:53.7	+8:14.0	37:53.7
6	207	Maddie Mullin; Guide: Brooke Ailey	Canada	NS3	100	38:05.5	+8:25.8	38:05.5
7	206	Aneta Kobryń; Guide: Bartłomiej Puto	Poland	NS2	97	40:36.4	+10:01.7	39:23.3
8	202	Yang Qianru; Guide: Wang Guanyu	China	NS3	100	40:28.9	+10:49.2	40:28.9
9	204	Romana Lobasheva; Guide: Anastasiia Shabaldina	Ukraine	NS3	100	41:07.2	+11:27.5	41:07.2
10	203	Kotoha Matsudo; Guide: Yuji Shimada	Japan	NS3	100	43:59.8	+14:20.1	43:59.8
11	201	Anna Grachova; Guide: Yermek Ormantayev	Kazakhstan	NS3	100	48:10.0	+18:30.3	48:10.0

== Standing ==
Rank	Bib	Name	Country	Class	%	Real time	Delta	Result
1st place, gold medalist(s)	111	Sydney Peterson	United States	LW9	88	33:53.2		29:49.2
2nd place, silver medalist(s)	112	Vilde Nilsen	Norway	LW4	97	30:47.2	+2.7	29:51.8
3rd place, bronze medalist(s)	110	Brittany Hudak	Canada	LW8	92	34:48.0	+2:23.2	32:01.0
4	106	Yurika Abe	Japan	LW6	90	37:25.4	+4:17.4	33:40.9
5	107	Ellen Westerlund	Sweden	LW9	88	38:58.6	+5:05.4	34:18.0
6	108	Emma Archibald	Canada	LW5/7	81	43:45.7	+6:56.8	35:26.8
7	103	Mika Iwamoto	Japan	LW8	92	39:34.1	+7:09.3	36:24.2
8	105	Alice Morelius	Sweden	LW8	92	39:57.3	+7:32.5	36:45.5
9	104	Momoko Dekijima	Japan	LW6	90	42:44.0	+9:36.0	38:27.6
10	102	Darya Fedzkovich	Belarus	LW4	97	41:35.5	+10:51.0	40:20.6
11	101	Tabea Dolžan	Slovenia	LW3	86	54:44.7	+20:04.2	47:04.8
	109	Kathrin Marchand	Germany	LW9	88	Did not finish		

== Sitting ==
Rank	Bib	Name	Country	Class	%	Real time	Delta	Result
1st place, gold medalist(s)	21	Oksana Masters	United States	LW12	100	26:31.6		26:31.6
2nd place, silver medalist(s)	18	Kim Yun-ji	South Korea	LW10.5	87	30:52.4	+23.0	26:51.6
3rd place, bronze medalist(s)	19	Kendall Gretsch	United States	LW11.5	96	28:36.3	+58.3	27:27.6
4	20	Anja Wicker	Germany	LW10	86	31:57.6	+1:06.9	27:29.1
5	17	Aline Rocha	Brazil	LW10.5	87	32:53.9	+2:24.5	28:37.3
6	16	Zhai Yuxin	China	LW12	100	28:38.2	+2:06.6	28:38.2
7	12	Shan Yilin	China	LW12	100	29:17.7	+2:46.1	29:17.7
8	3	Lauren Parker	Australia	LW10	86	34:29.2	+3:38.5	29:39.5
9	11	Indira Liseth	Norway	LW10.5	87	34:05.9	+3:36.4	29:39.9
10	14	Andrea Eskau	Germany	LW11	93	32:00.7	+3:29.4	29:46.3
11	6	Lidziya Loban	Belarus	LW12	100	30:07.9	+3:36.3	30:07.9
12	13	Christina Picton	Canada	LW12	100	30:11.6	+3:40.0	30:11.6
13	8	Nicole Zaino	United States	LW11.5	96	32:00.8	+4:22.9	30:44.0
14	10	Valiantsina Biryla	Belarus	LW10.5	87	35:30.0	+5:00.6	30:53.1
15	4	Erin Martin	United States	LW10	86	38:29.3	+7:38.6	33:06.0
16	9	Elena de Sena	Brazil	LW12	100	33:33.8	+7:02.2	33:33.8
17	5	Lyne-Marie Bilodeau	Canada	LW12	100	34:52.2	+8:20.6	34:52.2
18	2	Nana Sato	Japan	LW10.5	87	44:02.4	+13:33.0	38:18.9
19	1	Arna Sigríður Albertsdóttir	Iceland	LW10	86	46:32.8	+15:42.1	40:01.8
	7	Han Seung-hee	South Korea	LW10	86	Did not start		
	15	Merle Menje	Germany	LW11	93	Did not start		

== See also ==
- Cross-country skiing at the 2026 Winter Olympics
