= Canada at the 2026 Winter Paralympics =

- Flag of Canada
- IPC code: CAN
- NPC: Canadian Paralympic Committee
- Website: www.paralympic.ca

in Milan and Cortina d'Ampezzo, Italy 6 March 2026 – 15 March 2026
- Competitors: 46 (34 men and 12 women) in 6 sports
- Flag bearers (opening): Tyler McGregor & Natalie Wilkie
- Flag bearers (closing): Natalie Wilkie & Mark Ideson
- Medals Ranked 8th: Gold 3 Silver 4 Bronze 8 Total 15

Winter Paralympics appearances (overview)
- 1976; 1980; 1984; 1988; 1992; 1994; 1998; 2002; 2006; 2010; 2014; 2018; 2022; 2026

Canada competed at the 2026 Winter Paralympics in Milan and Cortina d'Ampezzo, Italy, which took place between 6–15 March 2026.

The three gold medals won by the Canadian team represented the lowest total since 1998 and meant the country finished outside the top five of the medal table for the first time since 2006, a span of 20 years.

== Medallists ==
Medal	Name	Sport	Event	Date
Gold	Natalie Wilkie	Para biathlon	Women's individual, standing	8 March
Gold	Natalie Wilkie	Para biathlon	Women's sprint pursuit, standing	13 March
Gold	Mark Ideson; Jon Thurston; Ina Forrest; Collinda Joseph; Gil Dash	Wheelchair curling	Mixed team	14 March
Silver	Kalle Eriksson; Guide: Sierra Smith	Para alpine skiing	Men's downhill, visually impaired	7 March
Silver	Natalie Wilkie	Para biathlon	Women's sprint, standing	7 March
Silver	Mark Arendz	Para biathlon	Men's individual, standing	8 March
Silver	Canada national para ice hockey team	Para ice hockey	Open tournament	15 March
Bronze	Kurt Oatway	Para alpine skiing	Men's downhill, sitting	7 March
Bronze	Tyler Turner	Para snowboard	Men's snowboard cross, SB-LL1	8 March
Bronze	Kalle Eriksson; Guide: Sierra Smith	Para alpine skiing	Men's super-G, visually impaired	9 March
Bronze	Natalie Wilkie	Para cross-country skiing	Women's sprint classical, standing	10 March
Bronze	Brittany Hudak	Para cross-country skiing	Women's 10 kilometre classical, standing	11 March
Bronze	Mark Arendz	Para cross-country skiing	Men's 10 kilometre classical, standing	11 March
Bronze	Michaela Gosselin	Para alpine skiing	Women's slalom, standing	14 March
Bronze	Kalle Eriksson; Guide: Sierra Smith	Para alpine skiing	Men's slalom, visually impaired	15 March

Medals by sport
Sport	1st place, gold medalist(s)	2nd place, silver medalist(s)	3rd place, bronze medalist(s)	Total
Para biathlon	2	2	0	4
Para alpine skiing	0	1	4	5
Para cross-country skiing	0	0	3	3
Para snowboard	0	0	1	1
Wheelchair curling	1	0	0	1
Para ice hockey	0	1	0	1
Total	3	4	8	15

Medals by date
Day	Date	1st place, gold medalist(s)	2nd place, silver medalist(s)	3rd place, bronze medalist(s)	Total
1	March 7	0	2	1	3
2	March 8	1	1	1	3
3	March 9	0	0	1	1
4	March 10	0	0	1	1
5	March 11	0	0	2	2
6	March 12	0	0	0	0
7	March 13	1	0	0	1
8	March 14	1	0	1	2
9	March 15	0	1	1	2
Total		3	4	8	15

Medals by gender
Gender	1st place, gold medalist(s)	2nd place, silver medalist(s)	3rd place, bronze medalist(s)	Total
Female	2	1	3	6
Male	0	2	5	7
Mixed	1	1	0	2
Total	3	4	8	15

Multiple medallists
Name	Sport	1st place, gold medalist(s)	2nd place, silver medalist(s)	3rd place, bronze medalist(s)	Total
Natalie Wilkie	Para biathlon / Para cross-country skiing	2	1	1	4
Kalle Eriksson; Guide: Sierra Smith	Para alpine skiing	0	1	2	3
Mark Arendz	Para biathlon / Para cross-country skiing	0	1	1	2

== Competitors ==
The following is the list of number of competitors participating at the Games per sport/discipline.

Sport	Men	Women	Total
Para alpine skiing	4	3	7
Para biathlon	6	6	12
Para cross-country skiing	6	6	12
Para ice hockey	17	0	17
Para snowboard	4	1	5
Wheelchair curling	3	2	5
Total	34	12	46

== Para alpine skiing ==
Canada is scheduled to compete in para alpine skiing.

Men

Athlete	Class	Event	Run 1		Run 2		Total	
Athlete	Class	Event	Time	Rank	Time	Rank	Time	Rank
Kalle Eriksson; Guide: Sierra Smith	AS2	Downhill, visually impaired	—N/a				1:18.33	2nd place, silver medalist(s)
Kalle Eriksson; Guide: Sierra Smith	AS2	Super-G, visually impaired	—N/a				1:13.29	3rd place, bronze medalist(s)
Kalle Eriksson; Guide: Sierra Smith	AS2	Giant slalom, visually impaired	1:03.69	3	1:06.34	4	2:10.03	4
Kalle Eriksson; Guide: Sierra Smith	AS2	Slalom, visually impaired	46.4	3	44.81	3	1:31.26	3rd place, bronze medalist(s)
Kalle Eriksson; Guide: Sierra Smith	AS2	Super combined, visually impaired	1:13.73	2	43.78	5	1:57.51	4
Alexis Guimond	LW9–1	Downhill, standing	—N/a				DNF	
Alexis Guimond	LW9–1	Super-G, standing	—N/a				DNF	
Alexis Guimond	LW9–1	Giant slalom, standing	1:06.45	5	DNF			
Kurt Oatway	LW12–1	Downhill, sitting	—N/a				1:19.42	3rd place, bronze medalist(s)
Kurt Oatway	LW12–1	Super-G, sitting	—N/a				DNF	
Kurt Oatway	LW12–1	Giant slalom, sitting	DNF					
Kurt Oatway	LW12–1	Slalom, sitting	48.61	5	45.94	11	1:34.55	8
Kurt Oatway	LW12–1	Super combined, sitting	DNF					
Brian Rowland	LW11	Downhill, sitting	—N/a				DNF	
Brian Rowland	LW11	Super-G, sitting	—N/a				DNF	
Brian Rowland	LW11	Giant slalom, sitting	1:20.13	20	1:15.64	16	2:35.77	17

Women

Athlete	Class	Event	Run 1		Run 2		Total	
Athlete	Class	Event	Time	Rank	Time	Rank	Time	Rank
Florence Carrier	LW4	Giant slalom, standing	1:25.70	16	1:25.17	12	2:50.87	13
Florence Carrier	LW4	Slalom, standing	47.91	10	50.49	11	1:38.40	11
Michaela Gosselin	LW6/8–1	Downhill, standing	—N/a				1:27.26	5
Michaela Gosselin	LW6/8–1	Super-G, standing	—N/a				1:22.99	9
Michaela Gosselin	LW6/8–1	Giant slalom, standing	1:18.10	10	1:19.98	8	2:38.08	8
Michaela Gosselin	LW6/8–1	Slalom, standing	44.05	3	45.14	5	1:29.19	3rd place, bronze medalist(s)
Michaela Gosselin	LW6/8–1	Super combined, standing	1:23.86	9	49.33	7	2:13.19	7
Mollie Jepsen	LW6/8–2	Downhill, standing	—N/a				1:26.10	4

== Para biathlon ==
Canada is scheduled to compete in para biathlon.

Men

Athlete	Class	Event	Qualification			Final		
Athlete	Class	Event	Missed shots	Time	Rank	Missed shots	Time	Rank
Mark Arendz	LW6	Individual, standing	—N/a			1 (1+0+0+0)	30:52.5	2nd place, silver medalist(s)
Mark Arendz	LW6	Sprint, standing	—N/a			1 (1+0)	17:49.6	5
Mark Arendz	LW6	Sprint pursuit, standing	1 (1+0)	10:14.6	5 Q	1 (1+0)	11:13.0	4
Collin Cameron	LW11.5	Individual, sitting	—N/a			1 (1+0+0+0)	37:26.4	7
Collin Cameron	LW11.5	Sprint, sitting	—N/a			1 (0+1)	21:18.9	11
Derek Zaplotinsky	LW10.5	Individual, sitting	—N/a			6 (1+2+2+1)	45:20.3	24
Derek Zaplotinsky	LW10.5	Sprint, sitting	—N/a			2 (1+1)	22:15.6	14
Derek Zaplotinsky	LW10.5	Sprint pursuit, sitting	2 (0+2)	9:33.1	14 Q	5 (2+3)	13:40.0	20

Women

Athlete	Class	Event	Qualification			Final		
Athlete	Class	Event	Missed shots	Time	Rank	Missed shots	Time	Rank
Brittany Hudak	LW8	Individual, standing	—N/a			0 (0+0+0+0)	34:47.0	5
Brittany Hudak	LW8	Sprint, standing	—N/a			0 (0+0)	19:43.3	6
Brittany Hudak	LW8	Sprint pursuit, standing	1 (1+0)	11:34.8	8 Q	1 (0+1)	13:51.3	9
Maddie Mullin; Guide: Brooke Ailey	NS3	Sprint, visually impaired	—N/a			2 (0+2)	24:50.0	10
Christina Picton	LW12	Individual, sitting	—N/a			1 (0+0+1+0)	43:59.4	8
Christina Picton	LW12	Sprint, sitting	—N/a			0 (0+0)	24:31.9	10
Natalie Wilkie	LW8	Individual, standing	—N/a			0 (0+0+0+0)	33:01.8	1st place, gold medalist(s)
Natalie Wilkie	LW8	Sprint, standing	—N/a			0 (0+0)	18:46.4	2nd place, silver medalist(s)
Natalie Wilkie	LW8	Sprint pursuit, standing	0 (0+0)	10:54.8	3 Q	0 (0+0)	12:18.0	1st place, gold medalist(s)

== Para cross-country skiing ==
Canada is scheduled to compete in para cross-country skiing. The team was officially named on January 30, 2026.

Men

Athlete	Class	Event	Qualification		Semifinal		Final	
Athlete	Class	Event	Time	Rank	Time	Rank	Time	Rank
Mark Arendz	LW6	Sprint classical, standing	2:31.78	7 Q	3:06.9	2 Q	2:49.7	6
Mark Arendz	LW6	10 km classical, standing	—N/a				27:59.3	3rd place, bronze medalist(s)
Jesse Bachinsky; Guide: Levi Nadlersmith	NS1	Sprint classical, visually impaired	3:15.87	15	Did not advance			
Jesse Bachinsky; Guide: Levi Nadlersmith	NS1	10 km classical, visually impaired	—N/a				34:19.0	11
Jesse Bachinsky; Guide: Levi Nadlersmith	NS1	20 km freestyle, visually impaired	—N/a				52:06.6	14
Collin Cameron	LW11.5	Sprint, sitting	2:10.92	2 Q	RAL	6	Did not advance	
Collin Cameron	LW11.5	10 km, sitting	—N/a				24:43.2	6
Collin Cameron	LW11.5	20 km, sitting	—N/a				54:47.4	10
Logan Larivière; Guide: Joseph Hutton	NS3	Sprint classical, visually impaired	3:05.24	12	Did not advance			
Logan Larivière; Guide: Joseph Hutton	NS3	10 km classical, visually impaired	—N/a				36:32.3	12
Logan Larivière; Guide: Joseph Hutton	NS3	20 km freestyle, visually impaired	—N/a				DNS	
Leo Sammarelli	LW10	Sprint, sitting	2:33.85	29	Did not advance			
Leo Sammarelli	LW10	10 km, sitting	—N/a				30:39.4	26
Leo Sammarelli	LW10	20 km, sitting	—N/a				1:06:30.6	27
Derek Zaplotinsky	LW10.5	10 km, sitting	—N/a				25:14.8	7
Derek Zaplotinsky	LW10.5	20 km, sitting	—N/a				DNS	

Women

Athlete	Class	Event	Qualification		Semifinal		Final	
Athlete	Class	Event	Time	Rank	Time	Rank	Time	Rank
Emma Archibald	LW5/7	Sprint classical, standing	3:15.32	11 Q	3:53.0	4	Did not advance	
Emma Archibald	LW5/7	10 km classical, standing	—N/a				35:26.8	6
Emma Archibald	LW5/7	20 km freestyle, standing	—N/a				DNS	
Lyne-Marie Bilodeau	LW12	Sprint, sitting	3:09.70	17	Did not advance			
Lyne-Marie Bilodeau	LW12	10 km, sitting	—N/a				34:52.2	17
Lyne-Marie Bilodeau	LW12	20 km, sitting	—N/a				1:20:51.2	15
Brittany Hudak	LW8	10 km classical, standing	—N/a				32:01.0	3rd place, bronze medalist(s)
Brittany Hudak	LW8	20 km freestyle, standing	—N/a				DNS	
Maddie Mullin; Guide: Brooke Ailey	NS3	Sprint classical, visually impaired	3:11.08	6 Q	3:41.4	3	Did not advance	
Maddie Mullin; Guide: Brooke Ailey	NS3	10 km classical, visually impaired	—N/a				38:05.5	6
Maddie Mullin; Guide: Brooke Ailey	NS3	20 km freestyle, visually impaired	—N/a				DNS	
Christina Picton	LW12	Sprint, sitting	2:50.10	11 Q	3:20.9	4	Did not advance	
Christina Picton	LW12	10 km, sitting	—N/a				30:11.6	12
Christina Picton	LW12	20 km, sitting	—N/a				1:10:53.8	11
Natalie Wilkie	LW8	Sprint classical, standing	2:53.08	1 Q	3:31.4	1 Q	3:40.2	3rd place, bronze medalist(s)
Natalie Wilkie	LW8	20 km freestyle, standing	—N/a				51:18.0	6

Relay

Athletes	Event	Time	Rank
Derek Zaplotinsky; Collin Cameron; Natalie Wilkie; Mark Arendz	4 × 2.5km mixed relay	24:15.1	5
Logan Larivière; Guide: Joseph Hutton; Jesse Bachinsky; Guide: Levi Nadlersmith; Emma Archibald; Maddie Mullin; Guide: Brooke Ailey	4 × 2.5km open relay	26:40.2	10

== Para ice hockey ==
Canada qualified to participate in the Games after placing in the top 5 at the 2025 World Para Ice Hockey Championships. The team was officially named on January 20, 2026.

Roster
Rob Armstrong, Vincent Boily, Shawn Burnett, Dominic Cozzolino, Adam Dixon, James Dunn, Auren Halbert, Tyrone Henry, Liam Hickey, Anton Jacobs-Webb, Adam Kingsmill, Micah Kovacevich, Zach Lavin, Mathieu Lelièvre, Tyler McGregor, Corbin Watson, Greg Westlake

Summary

Key:

- OT – Overtime
- GWS – Match decided by penalty-shootout

Team	Event	Group stage				Semifinal / Cl.	Final / BM / Pl.	
Team	Event	Opposition Score	Opposition Score	Opposition Score	Rank	Opposition Score	Opposition Score	Rank
Canada	Mixed tournament	Slovakia; W 8–0	Japan; W 14–0	Czech Republic; W 4–1	1 Q	China; W 4–2	United States; L 2–6	2nd place, silver medalist(s)

Group play

Pos	Team	Pld	W	OTW	OTL	L	GF	GA	GD	Pts	Qualification
1	Canada	3	3	0	0	0	26	1	+25	9	Semifinals
2	Czechia	3	2	0	0	1	12	7	+5	6	Semifinals
3	Slovakia	3	1	0	0	2	6	17	−11	3	5–8th place semifinals
4	Japan	3	0	0	0	3	3	22	−19	0	5–8th place semifinals

Source: Milano Cortina 2026

7 March 2026; 20:35	Canada	8–0 (4–0, 1–0, 3–0)	Slovakia	PalaItalia, Milan; Attendance: 4,438

Game reference

Corbin Watson
Goalies
Eduard Lepáček
Referee:
(Canada) Kevin Webinger
Linesmen:
(Czech Republic) Pavel Blažek
(Sweden) Tony Rundström

Dunn (Cozzolino, Boily) – 06:46	1–0
Halbert – 09:20	2–0
McGregor (Hickey, Jacobs-Webb) – 10:11	3–0
Boily (Lavin) – 11:42	4–0
Hickey (McGregor) – 20:29	5–0
Dunn – 35:06	6–0
Boily (Armstrong, Dunn) – 38:55	7–0
Cozzolino (Hickey) (PP) – 42:31	8–0

2 min
Penalties
4 min
51
Shots
2

9 March 2026; 20:35	Japan	0–14 (0–6, 0–3, 0–5)	Canada	PalaItalia, Milan; Attendance: 3,040

Game reference

Wataru Horie
Goalies
Adam Kingsmill
Referee:
(Czech Republic) Jan Vaněk
Linesmen:
(Serbia) Tibor Fazekas
(United States) Brendan Lewis

0–1	00:39 – McGregor (Jacobs-Webb, Halbert)
0–2	03:45 – McGregor (Jacobs-Webb, Lavin)
0–3	07:25 – Cozzolino (Armstrong)
0–4	11:46 – Cozzolino (Boily)
0–5	12:21 – Halbert (Jacobs-Webb, McGregor)
0–6	13:53 – Dixon (Hickey, McGregor) (PP)
0–7	23:44 – Boily (Halbert, Armstrong) (PP)
0–8	24:30 – Halbert (Lelièvre)
0–9	29:53 – Cozzolino (Hickey)
0–10	35:44 – Dunn (Boily, Cozzolino)
0–11	37:12 – Hickey (McGregor, Halbert)
0–12	39:44 – Halbert (Jacobs-Webb)
0–13	40:57 – Dunn (Boily, Armstrong)
0–14	42:45 – Halbert (Lelièvre)

12 min
Penalties
2 min
2
Shots
56

10 March 2026; 17:05	Canada	4–1 (0–0, 2–1, 2–0)	Czechia	PalaItalia, Milan; Attendance: 1,361

Game reference

Corbin Watson
Goalies
Patrik Sedláček
Referee:
(United States) Bobby Esposito
Linesmen:
(Norway) Marius Hermansen Oswold
(Sweden) Tony Rundström

Dunn (McGregor, Dixon) (PP) – 19:46	1–0
Boily (Jacobs-Webb) (PP) – 27:35	2–0
McGregor (Hickey, Cozzolino) (PP) – 31:57	3–0
	3–1	33:48 – Hábl (Doležal, Zelinka) (PP)
Hickey (McGregor) (EN) – 44:50	4–1

12 min
Penalties
12 min
26
Shots
12

Semifinal

13 March 2026; 19:05	Canada	4–2 (2–1, 0–1, 2–0)	China	PalaItalia, Milan; Attendance: 3,898

Game reference

Corbin Watson
Goalies
Wang Wei
Referee:
(Canada) Patrick Myers
Linesmen:
(Norway) Marius Hermansen Oswold
(Sweden) Tony Rundström

McGregor (Hickey, Cozzolino) (PP) – 06:05	1–0
McGregor (Hickey, Lelièvre) – 10:43	2–0
	2–1	14:36 – Zhang (Shen, Tian) (PP)
	2–2	15:55 – Tian (Wang Z., Shen) (PP)
Cozzolino (Lavin) – 38:53	3–2
Hickey (Jacobs-Webb, McGregor) – 40:48	4–2

8 min
Penalties
10 min
21
Shots
11

Final

15 March 2026; 16:05	United States	6–2 (1–0, 2–1, 3–1)	Canada	PalaItalia, Milan; Attendance: 11,500

Game reference

Griffin LaMarre
Goalies
Corbin Watson
Referee:
(Canada) Kevin Webinger
Linesmen:
(Canada) Dylan Dauphinee
(Sweden) Tony Rundström

Wallace (PP) – 08:39	1–0
	1–1	16:45 – Hickey (McGregor, Cozzolino) (PP)
Beasley – 21:29	2–1
Wallace (Farmer) – 24:52	3–1
Wallace (Pauls) – 31:42	4–1
	4–2	32:06 – Hickey
Farmer (Wallace) (SH) – 41:20	5–2
Roybal (SH, EN) – 41:29	6–2

6 min
Penalties
8 min
26
Shots
15

== Para snowboard ==
Canada is scheduled to compete in para snowboarding.

Banked slalom

Athlete	Event	Run 1	Run 2	Best	Rank
Alex Massie	Men's banked slalom, SB-LL2	~~1:00.94~~	59.48	59.48	10
Philippe Nadreau	Men's banked slalom, SB-LL2	~~1:04.14~~	59.18	59.18	9
Chase Nicklin	Men's banked slalom, SB-LL1	~~1:10.52~~	1:09.71	1:09.71	11
Tyler Turner	Men's banked slalom, SB-LL1	~~1:02.40~~	1:00.66	1:00.66	6
Sandrine Hamel	Women's banked slalom, SB-LL2	~~1:15.60~~	1:14.41	1:14.41	11

Snowboard cross

Athlete	Event	Qualification				Pre-heats	Quarterfinal	Semifinal	Final	
Athlete	Event	Run 1	Run 2	Best	Seed	Position	Position	Position	Position	Rank
Alex Massie	Men's snowboard cross, SB-LL2	52.24	1:00.65	52.24	8	—N/a	2 Q	2 Q	4	4
Philippe Nadreau	Men's snowboard cross, SB-LL2	52.99	53.49	52.99	10	—N/a	3	Did not advance		
Chase Nicklin	Men's snowboard cross, SB-LL1	1:20.44	1:14.84	1:14.84	15	—N/a	DNF	Did not advance		
Tyler Turner	Men's snowboard cross, SB-LL1	52.26	51.72	51.72	1	—N/a	1 Q	1 Q	DSQ	3rd place, bronze medalist(s)
Sandrine Hamel	Women's snowboard cross, SB-LL2	1:09.48	DNS	1:09.48	10	3	—N/a	Did not advance		

== Wheelchair curling ==
Canada has qualified to compete in the wheelchair curling mixed team event. Canada did not qualify for the mixed doubles event.

Summary

Team	Event	Group stage										Semifinal	Final / BM	
Team	Event	Opposition Score	Opposition Score	Opposition Score	Opposition Score	Opposition Score	Opposition Score	Opposition Score	Opposition Score	Opposition Score	Rank	Opposition Score	Opposition Score	Rank
Mark Ideson; Jon Thurston; Ina Forrest; Collinda Joseph; Gil Dash	Mixed team	ITA; W 9–8	GBR; W 5–4	NOR; W 9–2	LAT; W 11–1	CHN; W 9–4	SWE; W 6–5	SVK; W 9–6	KOR; W 6–3	USA; W 7–3	1 Q	KOR; W 8–7	CHN; W 4–3	1st place, gold medalist(s)

=== Mixed tournament ===
Final Round Robin Standings
Team	Skip	Pld	W	L	W–L	PF	PA	EW	EL	BE	SE	S%	DSC	Qualification
Canada	Mark Ideson	9	9	0	–	71	36	36	26	2	19	68.2%	84.488	Playoffs
China	Wang Haitao	9	8	1	–	76	42	38	26	1	15	68.3%	83.350	Playoffs
Sweden	Viljo Petersson-Dahl	9	5	4	1–0	47	48	31	31	6	13	62.8%	98.125	Playoffs
South Korea	Yang Hui-tae	9	5	4	0–1	55	48	36	32	1	17	64.6%	90.525	Playoffs
Norway	Jostein Stordahl	9	4	5	1–0	41	55	28	31	2	12	58.3%	130.863	
Italy	Egidio Marchese	9	4	5	0–1	52	53	32	27	0	15	60.6%	107.831	
Latvia	Ojārs Briedis	9	3	6	2–0	45	67	27	33	0	12	50.2%	113.381	
Slovakia	Radoslav Ďuriš	9	3	6	1–1	42	56	26	37	1	13	51.9%	117.688	
United States	Sean O'Neill	9	3	6	0–2	54	52	34	32	0	14	58.3%	72.156	
Great Britain	Hugh Nibloe	9	1	8	–	40	66	26	39	0	7	55.7%	129.675	

Source: Official website

Round robin
Canada had a bye in draws 1, 6 and 9.

Draw 2
Saturday, March 7, 18:35

Sheet A	1	2	3	4	5	6	7	8	Final
Italy (Marchese) 🔨	0	2	0	0	2	2	1	1	8
Canada (Ideson)	4	0	3	2	0	0	0	0	9

Draw 3
Sunday, March 8, 9:35

Sheet D	1	2	3	4	5	6	7	8	Final
Canada (Ideson) 🔨	0	0	1	1	0	0	0	3	5
Great Britain (Nibloe)	0	1	0	0	1	1	1	0	4

Draw 4
Sunday, March 8, 18:35

Sheet B	1	2	3	4	5	6	7	8	Final
Canada (Ideson) 🔨	1	0	0	2	0	6	X	X	9
Norway (Stordahl)	0	1	0	0	1	0	X	X	2

Draw 5
Monday, March 9, 9:35

Sheet C	1	2	3	4	5	6	7	8	Final
Canada (Ideson)	3	1	1	4	2	0	X	X	11
Latvia (Briedis) 🔨	0	0	0	0	0	1	X	X	1

Draw 7
Tuesday, March 10, 9:35

Sheet C	1	2	3	4	5	6	7	8	Final
China (Wang)	0	0	0	3	0	1	0	X	4
Canada (Ideson) 🔨	2	0	1	0	2	0	4	X	9

Draw 8
Tuesday, March 10, 18:35

Sheet D	1	2	3	4	5	6	7	8	Final
Sweden (Petersson-Dahl)	0	0	0	0	1	1	3	0	5
Canada (Ideson) 🔨	1	1	0	1	0	0	0	3	6

Draw 10
Wednesday, March 11, 20:05

Sheet B	1	2	3	4	5	6	7	8	Final
Slovakia (Ďuriš)	0	0	2	1	1	2	0	0	6
Canada (Ideson) 🔨	2	4	0	0	0	0	1	2	9

Draw 11
Thursday, March 12, 13:35

Sheet A	1	2	3	4	5	6	7	8	Final
Canada (Ideson)	1	1	0	2	0	0	1	1	6
South Korea (Yang) 🔨	0	0	1	0	1	1	0	0	3

Draw 12
Thursday, March 12, 18:35

Sheet D	1	2	3	4	5	6	7	8	Final
Canada (Ideson)	0	2	1	0	1	2	1	X	7
United States (O'Neill) 🔨	2	0	0	1	0	0	0	X	3

Semifinal

Friday, March 13, 10:05

Sheet B	1	2	3	4	5	6	7	8	Final
Canada (Ideson) 🔨	2	0	0	1	1	0	1	3	8
South Korea (Yang)	0	2	2	0	0	3	0	0	7

Final

Saturday, March 14, 15:05

Sheet C	1	2	3	4	5	6	7	8	Final
Canada (Ideson) 🔨	0	1	0	1	0	1	0	1	4
China (Wang)	0	0	1	0	1	0	1	0	3

== See also ==
- Canada at the Paralympics
- Canada at the 2026 Winter Olympics
