= Matt Brumby =

Australian Para triathlete, biathlete, and cross-country skier (born 1978)

Personal information
- Full name: Matthew Brumby
- Born: 23 January 1978 (age 48) Devonport, Tasmania, Australia

Sport
- Country: Australia
- Sport: Para triathlon; Para biathlon; Para cross-country skiing
- Disability: Spinal cord injury
- Disability class: PT1, LW10

Matthew "Matt" Brumby (born 23 January 1978) is an Australian Para triathlete and sit skier. He competed as a Para biathlete and cross-country skier at the 2026 Winter Paralympics.

== Personal ==
Brumby was born in Devonport, Tasmania. At the age of sixteen, he joined the Royal Australian Navy. At the age of twenty two, during a Navy clearance diver acceptance test, he collapsed on the beach. The next day, he passed out while riding a motorbike. This was due to fluid forming on the inside of his spinal cord, paralysing him from the chest down.

== Triathlon ==
Brumby has a PT1 classification in Para triathlon. He first represented Australia in 2010 at the Para Triathlon World Championships and narrowly missed selection at the 2016 Rio Paralympics. He won the World Half Para-Ironman World Championship in 2016 and full event at the Para-Ironman World Championship, Kona, Hawaii in 2019.

He co-captained the Australian Invictus Games team in 2018.

== Skiing ==
After triathlon, he transitioned to Para biathlon and Para cross-country skiing through Curtis and VESPA (Veterans Emergency Services Parabiathlon Australia) in 2021. He is classified as LW10 sit skier. He competed at the World Championships in 2024/2025.

At the 2026 Winter Paralympics, he competed in Para biathlon and Para cross-country skiing. His biathlon results were - 27th in Men's Sprint pursuit - Sitting and 28th in Men's Sprint - Sitting. His cross-country skiing results were - 31st in Men’s 10km classical - Sitting and 37th in Men's Sprint - Sitting.

In 2026, he was awarded Paralympics Australia Uncle Kevin Coombs Spirit of the Games Award.
