= Belarus at the 2026 Winter Paralympics =

- IPC code: BLR
- NPC: Paralympic Committee of the Republic of Belarus

in Milan and Cortina d'Ampezzo, Italy 6–15 March 2026
- Competitors: 4 (1 man and 3 women) in 1 sport
- Flag bearer (opening): Lidziya Loban
- Flag bearers (closing): Valiantsina Biryla & Raman Svirydzenka
- Medals Ranked 17th: Gold 1 Silver 1 Bronze 0 Total 2

Winter Paralympics appearances (overview)
- 1994; 1998; 2002; 2006; 2010; 2014; 2018; 2022; 2026

Other related appearances
- Soviet Union (1988); Unified Team (1992)

Belarus competed at the 2026 Winter Paralympics in Milan and Cortina d'Ampezzo, Italy, between 6 and 15 March 2026. It is Belarus's first appearance at the Winter Paralympics under its own flag since 2018.

== Background ==
On 24 February 2022, the first day of the Russian invasion of Ukraine, the International Olympic Committee condemned the breach of the Olympic Truce (which lasts from the beginning of the Olympics through the end of the Paralympics) by Russia and Belarus. On 28 February 2022, the IOC Executive Board further called for Russian and Belarusian athletes not to be included in or allowed to participate in any international sporting event. On 2 March 2022, the IPC declared that Russian and Belarusian athletes would be included independently under or allowed to participate independently under the Paralympic flag, with their results not counting in the medal standings. As a result of criticism by several National Paralympic Committees, who threatened to boycott the Games, the IPC announced on 3 March 2022 that they would reverse their earlier decision, banning Russian and Belarusian athletes from competing at the 2022 Winter Paralympics. The 83 Russian and Belarusian athletes competing in the Games were asked to leave the Olympic Village: among them, several Belarusian cross-country skiers (Yury Holub, Sviatlana Sakhanenka, and Valiantsina Shyts) had won at least one medal in the previous Paralympic Nordic Ski World Championships.

At general assembly in Seoul in September 2025, the IPC voted to revoke sanctions against Russia and Belarus, reacquiring rights and privileges of IPC members. However, since they were not yet able to participate in the competitions organised by the federations, no athlete would have been able to qualify in time for 2026 Winter Paralympics. So, on 17 February 2026, the IPC granted six wildcards to Russian athletes and four to Belarusian for the 2026 Paralympic Games with their flags. As sign of protest, Czechia, Estonia, Finland, Latvia, Poland, and Ukraine will boycott the opening ceremony.

== Medallists ==
Medal	Name	Sport	Event	Date
Gold	Raman Svirydzenka	Para cross-country skiing	Men's sprint classical, standing	10 March
Silver	Raman Svirydzenka	Para cross-country skiing	Men's 10 kilometre classical, standing	11 March

== Competitors ==
Belarus will compete in cross-country skiing after being granted wild card slots; the athletes are evenly split between male and female. The following is the list of number of competitors participating at the Games per sport/discipline.

Sport	Men	Women	Total
Para cross-country skiing	1	3	4
Total	1	3	4

== Para cross-country skiing ==
Belarus is scheduled to compete in para cross-country skiing.

Men

Athlete	Class	Event	Qualification		Semifinal		Final	
Athlete	Class	Event	Time	Rank	Time	Rank	Time	Rank
Raman Svirydzenka	LW4	Sprint classical, standing	2:37.55	12	2:50.5	1	2:35.4	1st place, gold medalist(s)
Raman Svirydzenka	LW4	10 km classical, standing	—N/a				27:38.4	2nd place, silver medalist(s)
Raman Svirydzenka	LW4	20 km freestyle, standing	—N/a				46:34.5	14

Women

Athlete	Class	Event	Qualification		Semifinal		Final	
Athlete	Class	Event	Time	Rank	Time	Rank	Time	Rank
Valiantsina Biryla	LW10.5	Sprint, sitting	2:46.70	8	3:29.3	12	Did not advance	
Valiantsina Biryla	LW10.5	10 km, sitting	—N/a				30:53.1	14
Valiantsina Biryla	LW10.5	20 km, sitting	—N/a				1:13:39.3	13
Lidziya Loban	LW12	Sprint, sitting	2:46.70	9	3:22.5	6	Did not advance	
Lidziya Loban	LW12	10 km, sitting	—N/a				30:07.9	11
Lidziya Loban	LW12	20 km, sitting	—N/a				1:07:22.3	8
Darya Fedzkovich	LW4	Sprint classical, standing	3:21.50	14	Did not advance			
Darya Fedzkovich	LW4	10 km classical, standing	—N/a				40:20.6	10
Darya Fedzkovich	LW4	20 km freestyle, standing	—N/a				59:42.8	12

Relay

Athletes	Event	Time	Rank
Lidziya Loban; Valiantsina Biryla; Raman Svirydzenka; Darya Fedzkovich	4 × 2.5km mixed relay	28:31.8	9

== See also ==
- Individual Neutral Athletes at the 2026 Winter Olympics
