= David Miln =

Australian Paralympic skier

Personal information
- Nationality: Australia
- Born: 6 December 1985 (age 40) Salisbury, England

Sport
- Country: Australia

David Miln (born 6 December 1985) is an Australian para skier He competed in biathlon and cross- country skiing at the 2026 Winter Paralympics.

== Personal ==
Miln was born on 6 December 1985 in Salisbury, England. Miln served for nearly 15 years in the United Kingdom military as a Royal Marine Commando and Mine Warfare and Clearance Diving Officer. In 2019, he transferred to the Royal Australian Navy as a Mine Warfare and Clearance Diving Officer. In 2022, during a skiing holiday in Northern California, whilst carrying his one-year-old daughter Anna and guiding his three-year-old daughter Isla, they slipped into a large snow removal machine. This resulted in severe injuries to Miln and his eldest daughter who ended up with broken legs and pelvis.The accident left Miln with his left leg amputated above the knee and his right below the knee, along with various other injuries, including spinal fractures.

== Skiing ==
He is classified as LW12 sit skier. He represented Australia at the 2025 Invictus Games Vancouver Whistler and was Australia's Flag Bearer at the opening ceremony. He won a silver medal in advanced biathlon. He has competed in FIS international events since 2024/25.

At the 2026 Winter Paralympics, he competed in biathlon and cross-country skiing. His biathlon results were - 20th in Men's Individual Sitting, 25th in Men's Sprint pursuit - Sitting and 26th in Men's Sprint - Sitting. His cross-country skiing results were - 20th in Men’s 10km classical - Sitting, 23rd in Men's 20km Interval Start - Sitting and 28th in Men's Sprint - Sitting.

Miln also plays for wheelchair basketball club in Manly.

Miln stated that his philosophy is “It’s closed some doors, but opened a lot of others and it would be remiss of me not to make the most of these opportunities and enjoy it. Success for me is about pushing myself and trying to better myself."
