= Poland at the 2026 Winter Paralympics =

- Flag of Poland
- IPC code: POL
- NPC: Polish Paralympic Committee

in Milan & Cortina d'Ampezzo, Italy 6 March 2026 – 15 March 2026
- Competitors: 9 (6 men and 3 women) in 4 sports
- Medals Ranked 21st: Gold 0 Silver 1 Bronze 1 Total 2

Winter Paralympics appearances (overview)
- 1976; 1980; 1984; 1988; 1992; 1994; 1998; 2002; 2006; 2010; 2014; 2018; 2022; 2026

Poland will compete at the 2026 Winter Paralympics in Milan & Cortina d'Ampezzo, Italy, which will take place between 6–15 March 2026.

== Competitors ==
The following is the list of number of competitors participating at the Games per sport/discipline.

| Sport | Men | Women | Total |
|---|---|---|---|
| Para alpine skiing | 1 | 1 | 2 |
| Para biathlon | 5 | 1 | 6 |
| Para cross-country skiing | 5 | 1 | 6 |
| Para snowboard | 0 | 1 | 1 |
| Total | 6 | 3 | 9 |

== Medalists ==
The following Poland competitors won medals at the games. In the discipline sections below, the medalists' names are bolded.

| Medal | Name | Sport | Event | Date |
|---|---|---|---|---|
| Silver | Michał Gołaś; Guide: Kacper Walas | Para alpine skiing | Men's slalom, visually impaired | 15 March |
| Bronze | Michał Gołaś; Guide: Kacper Walas | Para alpine skiing | Men's giant slalom, visually impaired | 13 March |

Medals by sport
| Sport | 1st place, gold medalist(s) | 2nd place, silver medalist(s) | 3rd place, bronze medalist(s) | Total |
| Para alpine skiing | 0 | 1 | 1 | 2 |
| Total | 0 | 1 | 1 | 2 |

Medals by date
| Day | Date | 1st place, gold medalist(s) | 2nd place, silver medalist(s) | 3rd place, bronze medalist(s) | Total |
| 1 | 7 March | 0 | 0 | 0 | 0 |
| 2 | 8 March | 0 | 0 | 0 | 0 |
| 3 | 9 March | 0 | 0 | 0 | 0 |
| 4 | 10 March | 0 | 0 | 0 | 0 |
| 5 | 11 March | 0 | 0 | 0 | 0 |
| 6 | 12 March | 0 | 0 | 0 | 0 |
| 7 | 13 March | 0 | 0 | 1 | 1 |
| 8 | 14 March | 0 | 0 | 0 | 0 |
| 9 | 15 March | 0 | 1 | 0 | **1** |
| Total | | 0 | 1 | 1 | 2 |

Medals by gender
| Gender | 1st place, gold medalist(s) | 2nd place, silver medalist(s) | 3rd place, bronze medalist(s) | Total |
| Female | 0 | 0 | 0 | 0 |
| Male | 0 | 1 | 1 | 2 |
| Mixed | 0 | 0 | 0 | 0 |
| Total | 0 | 1 | 1 | 2 |

== Para alpine skiing ==
=== Men ===
| Athlete | Class | Event | Run 1 | | Run 2 | | Total | |
| Athlete | Class | Event | Time | Rank | Time | Rank | Time | Rank |
|---|---|---|---|---|---|---|---|---|
| Michał Gołaś; Guide: Kacper Walas | AS3 | Men's super-G, visually impaired | —N/a | | | | 1:16.77 | 6 |
| Michał Gołaś; Guide: Kacper Walas | AS3 | Men's giant slalom, visually impaired | 1:04.30 | 4 | 1:05.61 | 2 | 2:09.91 | 3rd place, bronze medalist(s) |
| Michał Gołaś; Guide: Kacper Walas | AS3 | Men's slalom, visually impaired | 45.51 | 1 | 44.05 | 2 | 1:29.56 | 2nd place, silver medalist(s) |
| Michał Gołaś; Guide: Kacper Walas | AS3 | Men's super combined, visually impaired | 1:19.41 | 7 | 42.62 | 2 | 2:02.03 | 5 |

=== Women ===
| Athlete | Class | Event | Run 1 | | Run 2 | | Total | |
| Athlete | Class | Event | Time | Rank | Time | Rank | Time | Rank |
|---|---|---|---|---|---|---|---|---|
| Oliwia Gołaś; Guide: Andrzej Stasik | AS3 | Women's giant slalom, visually impaired | 1:20.80 | 10 | DSQ | | | |
| Oliwia Gołaś; Guide: Andrzej Stasik | AS3 | Women's slalom, visually impaired | 49.60 | 9 | 49.23 | 9 | 1:38.33 | 9 |

== Para biathlon ==
=== Men ===
| Athlete | Class | Event | Qualification | | | Final | | |
| Athlete | Class | Event | Missed shots | Time | Rank | Missed shots | Time | Rank |
|---|---|---|---|---|---|---|---|---|
| Błażej Bieńko; Guide: Michał Lańda | NS3 | Men's individual, visually impaired | —N/a | | | 1 | 36:57.6 | 7 |
| Błażej Bieńko; Guide: Michał Lańda | NS3 | Men's sprint, visually impaired | —N/a | | | 0 | 20:34.9 | 9 |
| Błażej Bieńko; Guide: Michał Lańda | NS3 | Men's sprint pursuit, visually impaired | 0 | 11:48.0 | 9 Q | 1 | 15:16.7 | 8 |
| Paweł Gil; Guide: Radosław Koszyk | NS3 | Men's individual, visually impaired | —N/a | | | 6 | 42:29.8 | 12 |
| Paweł Gil; Guide: Radosław Koszyk | NS3 | Men's sprint, visually impaired | —N/a | | | 2 | 22:09.4 | 14 |
| Paweł Gil; Guide: Radosław Koszyk | NS3 | Men's sprint pursuit, visually impaired | 3 | 12:40.8 | 12 Q | 3 | 16:14.7 | 10 |

== Para cross-country skiing ==
=== Men ===
| Athlete | Class | Event | Qualification | | Semifinal | | Final | |
| Athlete | Class | Event | Time | Rank | Time | Rank | Time | Rank |
|---|---|---|---|---|---|---|---|---|
| Błażej Bieńko; Guide: Michał Lańda | NS3 | Men's sprint classical, visually impaired | 2:45.10 | 9 | Did not advance | | | |
| Piotr Garbowski; Guide: Jakub Twardowski | NS3 | Men's sprint classical, visually impaired | 2:35.62 | 7 Q | 3:05.3 | 4 | Did not advance | |
| Piotr Garbowski; Guide: Jakub Twardowski | NS3 | Men's 10 km classical, visually impaired | —N/a | | | | 31:36.0 | 7 |
| Piotr Garbowski; Guide: Jakub Twardowski | NS3 | Men's 20 km freestyle, visually impaired | —N/a | | | | 46:36.8 | 8 |
| Krzysztof Plewa | LW11 | Men's 10 km, sitting | —N/a | | | | 27:08.1 | 17 |
| Krzysztof Plewa | LW11 | Men's 20 km, sitting | —N/a | | | | 58:16.8 | 16 |
| Witold Skupień | LW5/7 | Men's sprint classical, standing | 2:35.12 | 10 Q | 3:22.5 | 6 | Did not advance | |
| Witold Skupień | LW5/7 | Men's 10 km classical, standing | —N/a | | | | 28:57.1 | 5 |
| Witold Skupień | LW5/7 | Men's 20 km freestyle, standing | —N/a | | | | 45:06.4 | 10 |

=== Women ===
| Athlete | Class | Event | Qualification | | Semifinal | | Final | |
| Athlete | Class | Event | Time | Rank | Time | Rank | Time | Rank |
|---|---|---|---|---|---|---|---|---|
| Aneta Kobryń; Guide: Bartłomiej Puto | NS3 | Women's sprint classical, visually impaired | 3:13.14 | 7 Q | 3:42.6 | 4 | Did not advance | |
| Aneta Kobryń; Guide: Bartłomiej Puto | NS3 | Women's 10 km classical, visually impaired | —N/a | | | | 39:23.3 | 7 |
| Aneta Kobryń; Guide: Bartłomiej Puto | NS3 | Women's 20 km freestyle, visually impaired | —N/a | | | | 57:33.7 | 8 |

=== Relay ===
| Athlete | Event | Classification | Total factor | Time | Rank |
|---|---|---|---|---|---|
| Krzysztof Plewa Piotr Garbowski; Guide: Jakub Twardowski Błażej Bieńko; Guide: Michał Lańda Aneta Kobryń; Guide: Bartłomiej Puto | Open 4 × 2.5 km relay | LW12 NS3 NS3 NS2 | 88% 100% 100% 82% 370% | 6:37.4 5:32.6 5:40.1 6:56.7 22:28.8 | 10 2 3 11 8 |

== Para snowboard ==
Banked slalom

| Athlete | Event | Run 1 | Run 2 | Best | Rank |
|---|---|---|---|---|---|
| Natalia Siuba-Jarosz | Women's banked slalom, SB-LL2 | 1:20.75 | 1:20.08 | 1:20.08 | 13 |

Snowboard cross

| Athlete | Event | Seeding | | Pre-Heats | Semifinal | Final | |
| Athlete | Event | Time | Rank | Position | Position | Position | Rank |
|---|---|---|---|---|---|---|---|
| Natalia Siuba-Jarosz | Women's snowboard cross, SB-LL2 | 1:11.27 | 11 | 4 | Did not advance | | 11 |

== See also ==
- Poland at the Paralympics
- Poland at the 2026 Winter Olympics
