= Brazil at the 2026 Winter Paralympics =

- Flag of Brazil
- IPC code: BRA
- NPC: Brazilian Paralympic Committee

in Milan & Cortina d'Ampezzo, Italy 6 March 2026 – 15 March 2026
- Competitors: 8 (5 men and 3 women) in 3 sports
- Flag bearers (opening): Cristian Ribera; Aline Rocha
- Flag bearer (closing): André Barbieri
- Medals Ranked 23rd: Gold 0 Silver 1 Bronze 0 Total 1

Winter Paralympics appearances (overview)
- 2014; 2018; 2022; 2026

Brazil competed at the 2026 Winter Paralympics in Milan & Cortina d'Ampezzo, Italy, which took place between 6–15 March 2026.

Para cross-country skier & para-biathlete Aline Rocha and para cross-country skier Cristian Ribera were the country's opening ceremony flagbearers. Meanwhile, the para-snowboarder André Barbieri was the country's flagbearer during the closing ceremony.

On 10 March 2026, Brazil won the first medal in their Winter Paralympics history, with Cristian Ribera's silver medal in the Men's sprint - sitting. It was also the first medal for a tropical nation and South America at the Winter Games.

== Medallists ==
Medal	Name	Sport	Event	Date
Silver	Cristian Ribera	Para cross-country skiing	Men's sprint, sitting	10 March

== Competitors ==
The following is the list of number of competitors participating at the Games per sport/discipline.

Sport	Men	Women	Total
Para biathlon	4	2	6
Para cross-country skiing	4	2	6
Para snowboard	1	1	2
Total	5	3	8

== Para biathlon ==
Brazil has qualified four para-biathletes for the following Paralympics events.

Men

Athlete	Class	Event	Qualification			Final		
Athlete	Class	Event	Missed shots	Time	Rank	Missed shots	Time	Rank
Robelson Lula	LW12	Individual, sitting	—N/a			10 (1+3+4+2)	48:54.9	26
Robelson Lula	LW12	Sprint, sitting	—N/a			4 (2+2)	24:27.0	21
Robelson Lula	LW12	Sprint pursuit, sitting	4 (2+2)	10:54.7	24 Q	2 (0+2)	13:56.6	21
Guilherme Rocha	LW12	Individual, sitting	—N/a			3 (1+0+2+0)	42:30.9	16
Guilherme Rocha	LW12	Sprint, sitting	—N/a			0 (0+0)	22:48.9	16
Guilherme Rocha	LW12	Sprint pursuit, sitting	1 (0+1)	9:57.7	19 Q	2 (1+1)	12:55.9	15

Women

Athlete	Class	Event	Qualification			Final		
Athlete	Class	Event	Missed shots	Time	Rank	Missed shots	Time	Rank
Elena de Sena	LW12	Individual, sitting	—N/a			6 (0+1+2+3)	54:36.8	11
Elena de Sena	LW12	Sprint, sitting	—N/a			1 (1+0)	27:43.2	14
Elena de Sena	LW12	Sprint pursuit, sitting	0 (0+0)	12:12.2	12 Q	3 (2+1)	17:42.2	12
Aline Rocha	LW10.5	Sprint, sitting	—N/a			2 (0+2)	23:50.6	7

== Para cross-country skiing ==
Brazil has qualified six para cross-country skiers for the following Paralympics events.

Individual

Athlete	Class	Event	Qualification		Semifinal		Final	
Athlete	Class	Event	Time	Rank	Time	Rank	Time	Rank
Wellington da Silva	LW8	Men's sprint classical, standing	2:48.29	19	Did not advance			
Wellington da Silva	LW8	Men's 10 km classical, standing	—N/a				33:19.9	18
Wellington da Silva	LW8	Men's 20 km freestyle, standing	—N/a				52:54.0	25
Robelson Lula	LW12	Men's sprint, sitting	2:25.01	20	Did not advance			
Robelson Lula	LW12	Men's 10 km, sitting	—N/a				26:46.3	15
Robelson Lula	LW12	Men's 20 km, sitting	—N/a				1:01:07.3	22
Cristian Ribera	LW11	Men's sprint, sitting	2:08.22	1 Q	2:28.7	1 Q	2:29.6	2nd place, silver medalist(s)
Cristian Ribera	LW11	Men's 10 km, sitting	—N/a				24:31.1	5
Cristian Ribera	LW11	Men's 20 km, sitting	—N/a				53:40.8	5
Guilherme Rocha	LW12	Men's sprint, sitting	2:22.41	18	Did not advance			
Guilherme Rocha	LW12	Men's 10 km, sitting	—N/a				26:34.3	14
Guilherme Rocha	LW12	Men's 20 km, sitting	—N/a				58:49.4	19
Elena de Sena	LW12	Women's sprint, sitting	2:57.52	16	Did not advance			
Elena de Sena	LW12	Women's 10 km, sitting	—N/a				33:33.8	16
Elena de Sena	LW12	Women's 20 km, sitting	—N/a				1:19:04.9	14
Aline Rocha	LW10.5	Women's sprint, sitting	2:37.56	3 Q	3:05.0	2 Q	3:21.0	5
Aline Rocha	LW10.5	Women's 10 km, sitting	—N/a				28:37.3	5
Aline Rocha	LW10.5	Women's 20 km, sitting	—N/a				1:01:30.2	5

Relay

Athletes	Event	Time	Rank
Cristian Ribera; Aline Rocha; Wellington da Silva; Wellington da Silva	4 × 2.5 km mixed relay	27:00.5	7

== Para snowboard ==
Brazil has qualified two para-snowboarders for the following Paralympics events. One of them qualified for Milan-Cortina 2026, by virtue in the Paralympic rankings in their respective class. And also secured one place under the bipartite invitation (one of the quotas not used by another continent).

Banked slalom

Athlete	Event	Run 1	Run 2	Best	Rank
André Barbieri	Men's banked slalom, SB-LL1	~~1:16.31~~	1:11.86	1:11.86	13
Vitoria Machado	Women's banked slalom, SB-LL2	~~1:21.68~~	1:16.42	1:16.42	12

== See also ==
- Brazil at the Paralympics
- Brazil at the 2026 Winter Olympics
