= Raman Svirydzenka =

Belarusian Para cross-country skier (born 2004)

Personal information
- Born: 12 August 2004 (age 22)

Sport
- Country: Belarus
- Sport: Para cross-country skiing
- Disability class: LW4
Medal record
Men's Para cross-country skiing
Representing Belarus
Paralympic Games
Gold medal – first place	2026 Milano Cortina	Sprint standing
Silver medal – second place	2026 Milano Cortina	10 km standing

Raman Svirydzenka (born 12 August 2004) is a Belarusian Para cross-country skier. He represented Belarus at the 2026 Winter Paralympics.

== Career ==
In February 2026, he was selected to represent Belarus at the 2026 Winter Paralympics. This marked the first time Belarus competed at the Winter Paralympic Games under their own flag since 2018. He won a gold medal in the sprint standing event with a time of 2:35.4. He also won a silver medal in the 10 kilometre classical standing event with a time of 27:38.4.
