= Huang Lingxin =

Chinese Para cross-country skier (born 2002)

Personal information
- Nationality: Chinese
- Born: 28 July 2002 (age 24)

Sport
- Country: China
- Sport: Para cross-country skiing
- Disability class: LW5/7
Medal record
Men's Para cross-country skiing
Representing China
Paralympic Games
Silver medal – second place	2026 Milano Cortina	20 km standing
Bronze medal – third place	2026 Milano Cortina	4 × 2.5 km mixed relay

Huang Lingxin (born 28 July 2002) is a Chinese Para cross-country skier.

== Career ==
Huang represented China at the 2026 Winter Paralympics, where he won a bronze medal as part of the Chinese team in the 4 × 2.5 kilometre mixed relay.
