= Kayden Beasley =

American sledge hockey player (born 2006)

Personal information
- Born: December 22, 2006 (age 19) China

Sport
- Country: United States
- Sport: Ice sled hockey
- Position: Defense
Medal record
Para ice hockey
Representing United States
Paralympic Games
Gold medal – first place	2026 Milano Cortina	Team competition
World Championships
Gold medal – first place	2025 Buffalo	Team competition

Kayden Beasley (born December 22, 2006) is an American ice sled hockey player. He is a member of the United States national team that won a gold medal at the 2026 Winter Paralympics.

== Early life and education ==
Beasley was born in China as a congenital bilateral amputee. His birth parents abandoned him, and at three years old, he was adopted by Anthony and Amy Beasley and brought home to North Carolina on Christmas Day 2009. His brother, Caleb Beasley, was adopted in 2006 from the same Chinese province.

== Career ==
Beasley made his World Para Ice Hockey Championships debut for the United States at 2025 World Para Ice Hockey Championships and won a gold medal. He competed at the 2025 International Para Hockey Cup and ranked second on the team in scoring with two goals and five assists.

On January 2, 2026, he was named to Team USA's roster for the 2026 Winter Paralympics. He won a gold medal, Team USA's fifth consecutive gold medal in Para ice hockey at the Winter Paralympics.

== Personal life ==
Beasley is Christian and attends Grace Community Church in Angier, North Carolina.
