= Jonathan Arias (skier) =

Salvadoran para cross-country skier (born 1997)

Personal information
- Nationality: Salvadoran
- Born: 16 October 1997 (age 28) La Libertad, El Salvador

Sport
- Sport: Para cross-country skiing
- Disability class: LW10

Achievements and titles
- Paralympic finals: Milano–Cortina 2026

Jonathan Arias (born 16 October 1997) is a Salvadoran para cross-country skier who competes in the sitting classification LW10. He represented El Salvador at the 2026 Winter Paralympics, becoming one of the first athletes from the country to compete at a Winter Paralympic Games.

== Biography ==
Arias was born on 16 October 1997 in La Libertad, El Salvador. When he was 14 years old he was caught in the crossfire of a shootout between rival gangs, leaving him paralyzed from the waist down. After spending nearly a month in hospital and a long recovery period at home, he initially struggled to adjust to life with a disability before eventually becoming involved in adaptive sports.

During rehabilitation Arias began playing wheelchair basketball and later moved to San Salvador where he played on the same team as fellow athlete David Chávez. After the COVID-19 pandemic interrupted their sporting activities, Arias returned to La Libertad and supported his family by selling shaved ice from a cart while using his wheelchair.

In 2021 Arias met American coach Rob Powers, who helped launch a Para sport programme in El Salvador through the organisation OneTeam El Salvador. Arias initially joined a Para surfing programme and competed internationally, placing in the top ten at the 2021 World Para Surfing Championship in Pismo Beach, California. He later transitioned to Para cross-country skiing alongside Chávez after being introduced to the sport by Paralympic champion Dan Cnossen.

Because El Salvador has no winter sports infrastructure, much of Arias’s training has taken place on the beach at Playa El Cocal, where athletes use sit-skis on sand to develop strength and technique. The demanding conditions helped prepare him for competition on snow, even though he had limited experience skiing before competing internationally.

Arias competed at the FIS Nordic World Ski Championships Trondheim 2025 with Chávez, helping El Salvador secure a qualification slot for the 2026 Winter Paralympics. After initially missing direct qualification due to an accident that prevented him from competing in a key race, he later received confirmation of participation from the International Paralympic Committee.

At the 2026 Winter Paralympics in Milan and Cortina d'Ampezzo, Arias competed in the men’s sprint sitting and men’s 10 km interval start sitting events in Para cross-country skiing. In the sprint qualification he finished 36th with a time of 2:56.79, while Chávez finished 27th in the same event, marking the first participation of Salvadoran athletes in a Winter Paralympic competition.
