= Para cross-country skiing at the 2026 Winter Paralympics =

Para cross-country skiing at the XIV Paralympic Winter Games
- Venue: Lago di Tesero Cross-Country Stadium
- Dates: 10–15 March
- Competitors: 169 from 31 nations

Para cross-country skiing is one of the competitions at the 2026 Winter Paralympics in Milan and Cortina d'Ampezzo, Italy. In total, 20 medal events will be held.

== Medal summary ==
=== Medal table ===
The ranking in the table is based on information provided by the International Paralympic Committee (IPC) and will be consistent with IPC convention in its published medal tables. By default, the table will be ordered by the number of gold medals the athletes from a nation have won (in this context, a "nation" is an entity represented by a National Paralympic Committee). The number of silver medals is taken into consideration next and then the number of bronze medals. If nations are still tied, equal ranking is given and they are listed alphabetically by IPC country code.

* Host nation (Italy)

Rank	Nation	Gold	Silver	Bronze	Total
1	United States	8	1	2	11
2	Russia	5	0	0	5
3	China	3	4	6	13
4	Norway	1	2	1	4
5	South Korea	1	2	0	3
6	Belarus	1	1	0	2
7	France	1	0	2	3
8	Germany	0	4	1	5
9	Ukraine	0	2	1	3
10	Czech Republic	0	2	0	2
11	Brazil	0	1	0	1
11	Finland	0	1	0	1
13	Canada	0	0	3	3
14	Sweden	0	0	2	2
15	Italy*	0	0	1	1
15	Kazakhstan	0	0	1	1
Totals (16 entries)		20	20	20	60

=== Women's events ===
Event	Class	Gold		Silver		Bronze	
Sprint classical	visually impaired	Anastasiia Bagiian; Guide: Sergei Siniakin; Russia	3:16.1	Linn Kazmaier; Guide: Florian Baumann; Germany	3:25.3	Cong Jihong; Guide: Liu Jiaxuan; China	3:30.2
Sprint classical	sitting	Oksana Masters; United States	3:07.1	Kim Yun-ji; South Korea	3:10.1	Wang Shiyu; China	3:17.9
Sprint classical	standing	Vilde Nilsen; Norway	3:31.3	Sydney Peterson; United States	3:35.5	Natalie Wilkie; Canada	3:40.2
10 kilometres classical	visually impaired	Anastasiia Bagiian; Guide: Sergei Siniakin; Russia	29:39.7	Simona Bubeníčková; Guide: David Šrůtek; Czech Republic	31:59.1	Leonie Walter; Guide: Christian Krasman; Germany	35:30.8
10 kilometres classical	sitting	Oksana Masters; United States	26:31.6	Kim Yun-ji; South Korea	26:51.6	Kendall Gretsch; United States	27:27.6
10 kilometres classical	standing	Sydney Peterson; United States	29:49.2	Vilde Nilsen; Norway	29:51.8	Brittany Hudak; Canada	32:01.0
20 kilometres freestyle	visually impaired	Anastasiia Bagiian; Guide: Sergei Siniakin; Russia	43:59.1	Simona Bubeníčková; Guide: David Šrůtek; Czech Republic	47:27.2	Wang Yue; Guide: Chen Guoming; China	48:58.7
20 kilometres freestyle	sitting	Kim Yun-ji; South Korea	58:23.3	Anja Wicker; Germany	59:17.4	Oksana Masters; United States	59:34.5
20 kilometres freestyle	standing	Sydney Peterson; United States	47:25.8	Vilde Nilsen; Norway	48:39.7	Oleksandra Kononova; Ukraine	48:43.4

=== Men's events ===
Event	Class	Gold		Silver		Bronze	
Sprint classical	visually impaired	Jake Adicoff; Guide: Peter Wolter; United States	2:44.7	Yu Shuang; Guide: Shang Jincai; China	2:46.2	Zebastian Modin; Guide: Emil Talsi; Sweden	2:50.9
Sprint classical	sitting	Liu Zixu; China	2:28.9	Cristian Ribera; Brazil	2:29.6	Yerbol Khamitov; Kazakhstan	2:29.9
Sprint classical	standing	Raman Svirydzenka; Belarus	2:35.4	Sebastian Marburger; Germany	2:38.1	Benjamin Daviet; France	2:42.2
10 kilometres classical	visually impaired	Jake Adicoff; Guide: Reid Goble; United States	28:03.6	Inkki Inola; Guide: Reetu Inkilä; Finland	29:52.3	Zebastian Modin; Guide: Emil Talsi; Sweden	30:07.9
10 kilometres classical	sitting	Ivan Golubkov; Russia	24:05.8	Mao Zhongwu; China	24:22.1	Zheng Peng; China	24:24.5
10 kilometres classical	standing	Karl Tabouret; France	27:10.7	Raman Svirydzenka; Belarus	27:38.4	Mark Arendz; Canada	27:59.3
20 kilometres freestyle	visually impaired	Jake Adicoff; Guide: Peter Wolter; United States	42:17.4	Oleksandr Kazik; Guide: Serhii Kucheriavyi; Ukraine	42:24.6	Anthony Chalençon; Guide: Florian Michelon; France	43:21.9
20 kilometres freestyle	sitting	Ivan Golubkov; Russia	51:55.0	Mao Zhongwu; China	52:45.8	Giuseppe Romele; Italy	53:17.1
20 kilometres freestyle	standing	Wang Chenyang; China	41:15.2	Huang Lingxin; China	42:28.4	Liu Xiaobin; China	43:01.9

=== Mixed events ===
Event	Gold		Silver		Bronze	
Mixed 4 × 2.5 kilometre relay	United States; Joshua Sweeney; Oksana Masters; Sydney Peterson; Jake Adicoff; Guide: Reid Goble	23:24.2	Ukraine; Pavlo Bal; Taras Rad; Oleksandra Kononova; Liudmyla Liashenko	23:36.7	China; Mao Zhongwu; Zheng Peng; Huang Lingxin; Wang Yue; Guide: Chen Guoming	23:56.5
Open 4 × 2.5 kilometre relay	China; Wang Tao; Wang Chenyang; Dang Hesong; Guide: Lu Hongda; Yu Shuang; Guide: Shang Jincai	21:54.4	Germany; Sebastian Marburger; Marco Maier; Theo Bold; Guide: Jakob Bold; Linn Kazmaier; Guide: Florian Baumann	21:59.8	Norway; Kjartan Haugen; Vilde Nilsen; Thomas Oxaal; Guide: Geir Lervik	22:28.6

== Participating nations ==
- Argentina (2)
- Armenia (1)
- Australia (4)
- Austria (1)
- Belarus (4)
- Brazil (6)
- Canada (12)
- China (21)
- Czech Republic (3)
- El Salvador (2)
- Finland (1)
- France (4)
- Georgia (1)
- Germany (15)
- Great Britain (1)
- ~~Iran (1)~~ (withdrew)
- Iceland (1)
- Italy (6)
- Japan (12)
- Kazakhstan (7)
- Mongolia (2)
- Norway (5)
- Poland (5)
- Russia (2)
- Slovakia (1)
- Slovenia (1)
- South Korea (6)
- Spain (1)
- Sweden (5)
- Switzerland (1)
- Ukraine (23)
- United States (13)

== See also ==
- Cross-country skiing at the 2026 Winter Olympics
