= Sebastian Marburger =

German Para cross-country skier (born 1997)

Personal information
- Born: 16 August 1997 (age 29) Frankenberg (Eder), Germany

Sport
- Country: Germany
- Sport: Para cross-country skiing
- Disability class: LW2
Medal record
Men's Para cross-country skiing
Representing Germany
Paralympic Games
Silver medal – second place	2026 Milano Cortina	Sprint standing
Silver medal – second place	2026 Milano Cortina	4 × 2.5 km relay open
World Championships
Gold medal – first place	2023 Östersund	4×2.5 km open relay

Sebastian Marburger (born 16 August 1997) is a German Para cross-country skier. He represented Germany at the 2026 Winter Paralympics.

== Career ==
Marburger competed at the 2023 World Para Nordic Skiing Championships and won a gold medal in the 4×2.5 kilometre open relay event.

In February 2025, during the FIS Para Cross-Country World Cup he won the standing event in the 2026 Winter Paralympics test event. In February 2026, he was selected to represent Germany at the 2026 Winter Paralympics.

== Personal life ==
In 2020, Marburger had his right leg amputated after a motorcycle accident.
