= Cross-country skiing at the 2022 Winter Paralympics – Women's 10 kilometre =

Women's 10 kilometre at the XIII Paralympic Winter Games
- Paralympic cross-country skiing
- Dates: 12 March

Women's 10 kilometre (visually impaired) at the XIII Paralympic Winter Games
- Competitors: 7 from 5 nations

Medalists
1st place, gold medalist(s)		Linn Kazmaier; Guide: Florian Baumann	Germany
2nd place, silver medalist(s)		Wang Yue; Guide: Li Yalin	China
3rd place, bronze medalist(s)		Carina Edlinger; Guide: Josef Lorenz	Austria

Women's 10 kilometre (standing) at the XIII Paralympic Winter Games

Medalists
1st place, gold medalist(s)		Oleksandra Kononova	Ukraine
2nd place, silver medalist(s)		Natalie Wilkie	Canada
3rd place, bronze medalist(s)		Iryna Bui	Ukraine

Women's 7.5 kilometre (sitting) at the XIII Paralympic Winter Games

Medalists
1st place, gold medalist(s)		Yang Hongqiong	China
2nd place, silver medalist(s)		Oksana Masters	United States
3rd place, bronze medalist(s)		Ma Jing	China

The women's 10 kilometre free competition of the 2022 Winter Paralympics was held at the National Biathlon Center in Beijing on 12 March 2022.

== Medal table ==
Rank	Nation	Gold	Silver	Bronze	Total
1	China (CHN)*	1	1	1	3
2	Ukraine (UKR)	1	0	1	2
3	Germany (GER)	1	0	0	1
4	Canada (CAN)	0	1	0	1
4	United States (USA)	0	1	0	1
6	Austria (AUT)	0	0	1	1
Totals (6 entries)		3	3	3	9

== 10 km free visually impaired ==
In the cross-country skiing visually impaired, the athlete with a visual impairment has a sighted guide. The two skiers are considered a team, and dual medals are awarded.

Rank	Bib	Name	Country	Time	Difference
1st place, gold medalist(s)	55	Linn Kazmaier; Guide: Florian Baumann	Germany	41:40.8	–
2nd place, silver medalist(s)	54	Wang Yue; Guide: Li Yalin	China	42:20.3	+39.5
3rd place, bronze medalist(s)	57	Carina Edlinger; Guide: Josef Lorenz	Austria	43:13.9	+1:33.1
4	56	Oksana Shyshkova; Guide: Andriy Marchenko	Ukraine	43:36.6	+1:55.8
5	53	Johanna Recktenwald; Guide: Valentin Haag	Germany	46:14.4	+4:33.6
	51	Aneta Górska; Guide: Catherine Spierenburg	Poland	DNF	—N/a
	52	Nataliia Tkachenko; Guide: Denys Nikulin	Ukraine	DNF	—N/a

== 10 km free standing ==
Rank	Bib	Name	Country	Time	Difference
1st place, gold medalist(s)	73	Oleksandra Kononova	Ukraine	41:18.0	–
2nd place, silver medalist(s)	72	Natalie Wilkie	Canada	41:45.3	+27.3
3rd place, bronze medalist(s)	66	Iryna Bui	Ukraine	41:47.1	+29.1
4	75	Liudmyla Liashenko	Ukraine	41:56.1	+38.1
5	76	Vilde Nilsen	Norway	42:09.4	+51.4
6	70	Sydney Peterson	United States	42:17.2	+59.2
7	74	Brittany Hudak	Canada	43:16.3	+1:58.3
8	67	Iweta Faron	Poland	44:20.4	+3:02.4
9	65	Dani Aravich	United States	45:12.2	+3:54.2
10	69	Bohdana Konashuk	Ukraine	45:19.2	+4:01.2
11	68	Emily Young	Canada	45:40.1	+4:22.1
12	71	Yuliia Batenkova-Bauman	Ukraine	46:15.0	+4:57.0
13	63	Huang Bangjuan	China	46:40.2	+5:22.2
14	64	Momoko Dekijima	Japan	46:55.3	+5:37.3
15	62	Mika Iwamoto	Japan	55:17.0	+13:59.0
16	61	Grace Miller	United States	57:06.5	+15:48.5

== 7.5 km free sitting ==
Rank	Bib	Name	Country	Time	Difference
1st place, gold medalist(s)	124	Yang Hongqiong	China	24:47.5	–
2nd place, silver medalist(s)	136	Oksana Masters	United States	25:24.7	+37.2
3rd place, bronze medalist(s)	130	Ma Jing	China	26:22.9	+1:49.6
4	129	Li Panpan	China	26:31.1	+1:59.0
5	128	Shan Yilin	China	27:40.3	+2:52.8
6	135	Kendall Gretsch	United States	27:47.8	+3:07.8
7	133	Birgit Skarstein	Norway	28:35.9	+4:05.5
8	132	Christina Picton	Canada	28:55.6	+4:08.1
9	127	Zhai Yuxin	China	29:26.9	+4:39.4
10	134	Aline Rocha	Brazil	30:07.6	+6:07.9
11	134	Monika Kukla	Poland	31:50.2	+7:02.7
12	134	Indira Liseth	Norway	34:15.3	+9:27.8
13	125	Lyne-Marie Bilodeau	Canada	34:20.4	+9:32.9
14	126	Lera Doederlein	United States	35:27.8	+10:40.3
15	121	Erin Martin	United States	35:47.5	+11:00.0
16	122	Hope Gordon	Great Britain	38:01.4	+13:13.9

== See also ==
- Cross-country skiing at the 2022 Winter Olympics
