= Cross-country skiing at the 2022 Winter Paralympics – Women's 15 kilometre classical =

Women's 15 kilometre classical at the XIII Paralympic Winter Games
- Paralympic cross-country skiing
- Dates: 6–7 March

Women's 15 kilometre classical (visually impaired) at the XIII Paralympic Winter Games
- Competitors: 6 from 5 nations

Medalists
1st place, gold medalist(s)		Oksana Shyshkova; Guide: Andriy Marchenko	Ukraine
2nd place, silver medalist(s)		Linn Kazmaier; Guide: Florian Baumann	Germany
3rd place, bronze medalist(s)		Leonie Maria Walter; Guide: Pirmin Strecker	Germany

Women's 15 kilometre classical (standing) at the XIII Paralympic Winter Games
- Competitors: 11 from 6 nations

Medalists
1st place, gold medalist(s)		Natalie Wilkie	Canada
2nd place, silver medalist(s)		Sydney Peterson	United States
3rd place, bronze medalist(s)		Brittany Hudak	Canada

Women's 15 kilometre (sitting) at the XIII Paralympic Winter Games

Medalists
1st place, gold medalist(s)		Yang Hongqiong	China
2nd place, silver medalist(s)		Oksana Masters	United States
3rd place, bronze medalist(s)		Li Panpan	China

The Women's 15 kilometre classical competition of the 2022 Winter Paralympics was held at the National Biathlon Center in Beijing on 6 and 7 March 2022.

== Medal table ==
Rank	Nation	Gold	Silver	Bronze	Total
1	Canada (CAN)	1	0	1	2
1	China (CHN)*	1	0	1	2
3	Ukraine (UKR)	1	0	0	1
4	United States (USA)	0	2	0	2
5	Germany (GER)	0	1	1	2
Totals (5 entries)		3	3	3	9

== 15 km classical visually impaired ==
In the cross-country skiing visually impaired, the athlete with a visual impairment has a sighted guide. The two skiers are considered a team, and dual medals are awarded.

Rank	Bib	Name	Country	Time	Difference
1st place, gold medalist(s)	95	Oksana Shyshkova; Guide: Andriy Marchenko	Ukraine	51:09.1	–
2nd place, silver medalist(s)	93	Linn Kazmaier; Guide: Florian Baumann	Germany	52:05.6	+56.5
3rd place, bronze medalist(s)	94	Leonie Maria Walter; Guide: Pirmin Strecker	Germany	54:08.8	+2:59.7
4	92	Wang Yue; Guide: Li Yalin	China	57:05.9	+5:56.8
5	91	Nataliia Tkachenko; Guide: Denys Nikulin	Ukraine	59:45.0	+8:35.9
	96	Carina Edlinger; Guide: Lorenz Joseph Lampl	Austria	DNF	

== 15 km classical standing ==
Rank	Bib	Name	Country	Time	Difference
1st place, gold medalist(s)	78	Natalie Wilkie	Canada	48:04.8	–
2nd place, silver medalist(s)	76	Sydney Peterson	United States	49:00.2	+55.4
3rd place, bronze medalist(s)	79	Brittany Hudak	Canada	49:27.8	+1:23.0
4	74	Zhao Zhiqing	China	49:59.8	+1:55.0
5	75	Emily Young	Canada	52:06.7	+4:01.9
6	77	Yuliia Batenkova-Bauman	Ukraine	54:39.8	+6:35.0
7	72	Huang Bangjuan	China	55:34.3	+7:29.5
8	73	Yurika Abe	Japan	56:45.7	+8:40.9
9	71	Grace Miller	United States	1:02:22.4	+14:17.6
	81	Vilde Nilsen	Norway	DNF	
	80	Liudmyla Liashenko	Ukraine	DNF	

== 15 km sitting ==
Rank	Bib	Name	Country	Time	Difference
1st place, gold medalist(s)	31	Yang Hongqiong	China	43:06.7	–
2nd place, silver medalist(s)	39	Oksana Masters	United States	43:38.8	+32.1
3rd place, bronze medalist(s)	33	Li Panpan	China	45:17.0	+2:10.3
4	38	Kendall Gretsch	United States	46:26.2	+3:19.5
5	34	Ma Jing	China	46:43.9	+3:37.2
6	36	Birgit Skarstein	Norway	49:23.9	+6:17.2
7	37	Aline Rocha	Brazil	50:45.7	+7:39.0
8	35	Indira Liseth	Norway	54:09.2	+11:02.5
9	32	Lyne-Marie Bilodeau	Canada	59:38.1	+16:31.4

== See also ==
- Cross-country skiing at the 2022 Winter Olympics
