= Cross-country skiing at the 2018 Winter Paralympics =

Cross-country skiing at the XII Paralympic Winter Games
- Venue: Alpensia Biathlon Centre, South Korea
- Dates: 11–18 March

Cross-country skiing at the 2018 Winter Paralympics was held at the Alpensia Biathlon Centre, South Korea. The twenty events were held from 11 to 18 March 2018. Canadian Brian McKeever won three individual gold and a team relay bronze, his third triple gold medal performance, for a career total of 13 gold medals and 17 medals in all, making him the most decorated Paralympic cross-country skier ever.

== Events ==
The program includes 20 events. The events are mostly divided into three classifications (sitting, standing and visually impaired). For each of these classifications, there are three men's events and three women's events. There are also two relay events which combine classifications. Standing skiers are those that have a locomotive disability but are able to use the same equipment as able-bodied skiers, whereas sitting competitors use a sitski. Skiers with a visual impairment compete with the help of a sighted guide. The skier with the visual impairment and the guide are considered a team, and dual medals are awarded.

Men's events

- 1.1 km / 1.5 km sprint (all three classifications)
- 7.5 km (sitting) / 10 km (standing and visually impaired)
- 15 km (sitting) / 20 km (standing and visually impaired)

Women's events

- 1.1 km / 1.5 km sprint (all three classifications)
- 5 km (sitting) / 7.5 km (standing and visually impaired)
- 12 km (sitting) / 15 km (standing and visually impaired)

Relay events

- 4 x 2.5 km mixed relay (combined)
- 4 x 2.5 km open relay (combined)

== Competition schedule ==
The following is the competition schedule for all twenty events.

All times are local (UTC+9).

Date	Time	Event
11 March	10:00	Men's 15 km sitting
11 March	11:15	Women's 12 km sitting
12 March	10:00	Men's 20 km freestyle standing
12 March	10:25	Men's 20 km freestyle visually impaired
12 March	12:00	Women's 15 km freestyle visually impaired
12 March	12:15	Women's 15 km freestyle standing
14 March	10:00	Men's 1.1 km sprint, sitting qualification
14 March	10:17	Women's 1.1 km sprint, sitting qualification
14 March	10:35	Men's 1.5 km sprint classical, standing qualification
14 March	10:50	Women's 1.5 km sprint classical, standing qualification
14 March	11:10	Men's 1.5 km sprint classical, visually impaired qualification
14 March	11:25	Women's 1.5 km sprint classical, visually impaired qualification
14 March	12:00	Men's 1.1 km sprint, sitting semifinals
14 March	12:10	Women's 1.1 km sprint, sitting semifinals
14 March	12:21	Men's 1.5 km sprint classical, standing semifinals
14 March	12:31	Women's 1.5 km sprint classical, standing semifinals
14 March	12:42	Men's 1.5 km sprint classical, visually impaired semifinals
14 March	12:52	Women's 1.5 km sprint classical, visually impaired semifinals
14 March	13:06	Men's 1.1 km sprint, sitting final
14 March	13:20	Women's 1.1 km sprint, sitting final
14 March	13:34	Men's 1.5 km sprint classical, standing final
14 March	13:48	Women's 1.5 km sprint classical, standing final
14 March	14:02	Men's 1.5 km sprint classical, visually impaired final
14 March	14:16	Women's 1.5 km sprint classical, visually impaired final
17 March	10:00	Men's 10 km classical visually impaired
17 March	10:15	Men's 10 km classical standing
17 March	11:45	Women's 7.5 km classical standing
17 March	11:55	Women's 7.5 km classical visually impaired
17 March	12:40	Men's 7.5 km sitting
17 March	12:55	Women's 5 km sitting
18 March	10:00	4x2.5 km Mixed Relay
18 March	11:00	4x2.5 km Open Relay

== Medal summary ==
=== Medal table ===
Rank	Nation	Gold	Silver	Bronze	Total
1	United States (USA)	4	3	2	9
2	Canada (CAN)	4	1	5	10
3	Ukraine (UKR)	3	2	3	8
4	Belarus (BLR)	3	2	1	6
5	Neutral Paralympic Athletes (NPA)	2	4	3	9
6	France (FRA)	1	1	1	3
7	Japan (JPN)	1	1	0	2
8	South Korea (KOR)*	1	0	1	2
9	Kazakhstan (KAZ)	1	0	0	1
10	Germany (GER)	0	3	1	4
11	Norway (NOR)	0	2	2	4
12	Sweden (SWE)	0	1	0	1
13	Austria (AUT)	0	0	1	1
13	Finland (FIN)	0	0	1	1
Totals (14 entries)		20	20	21	61

=== Women's events ===
Event	Class	Gold		Silver		Bronze	
Sprint	Visually impaired	Sviatlana Sakhanenka; Guide: Raman Yashchanka; Belarus	4:29.9	Mikhalina Lysova; Guide: Alexey Ivanov; Neutral Paralympic Athletes	4:44.0	Oksana Shyshkova; Guide: Vitaliy Kazakov; Ukraine	4:45.6
Sprint	Sitting	Oksana Masters; United States	4:06.7	Andrea Eskau; Germany	4:08.8	Marta Zaynullina; Neutral Paralympic Athletes	4:10.4
Sprint	Standing	Anna Milenina; Neutral Paralympic Athletes	5:11.1	Vilde Nilsen; Norway	5:14.2	Natalie Wilkie; Canada	5:14.3
5 kilometres	Sitting	Oksana Masters; United States	16:42.0	Andrea Eskau; Germany	16:53.5	Marta Zaynullina; Neutral Paralympic Athletes	17:25.4
7.5 kilometres	Visually impaired	Sviatlana Sakhanenka; Guide: Raman Yashchanka; Belarus	22:19.3	Mikhalina Lysova; Guide: Alexey Ivanov; Neutral Paralympic Athletes	22:55.6	Carina Edlinger; Guide: Julian Edlinger; Austria	23:22.9
7.5 kilometres	Standing	Natalie Wilkie; Canada	22:12.2	Ekaterina Rumyantseva; Neutral Paralympic Athletes	22:13.8	Emily Young; Canada	22:13.9
12 kilometres	Sitting	Kendall Gretsch; United States	38:15.9	Andrea Eskau; Germany	38:48.3	Oksana Masters; United States	39:04.9
15 kilometres freestyle	Visually impaired	Sviatlana Sakhanenka; Guide: Raman Yashchanka; Belarus	49:11.7	Oksana Shyshkova; Guide: Vitaliy Kazakov; Ukraine	49:19.5	Mikhalina Lysova; Guide: Alexey Ivanov; Neutral Paralympic Athletes	52:29.2
15 kilometres freestyle	Standing	Ekaterina Rumyantseva; Neutral Paralympic Athletes	49:37.6	Anna Milenina; Neutral Paralympic Athletes	50:55.6	Liudmyla Liashenko; Ukraine	51:06.6

=== Men's events ===
Event	Class	Gold		Silver		Bronze	
Sprint	Visually impaired	Brian McKeever; Guide: Russell Kennedy; Canada	4:03.2	Zebastian Modin; Guide: Robin Bryntesson; Sweden	4:05.7	Eirik Bye; Guide: Arvid Nelson; Norway	4:32.7
Sprint	Sitting	Andrew Soule; United States	3:31.4	Dzmitry Loban; Belarus	3:31.4	Daniel Cnossen; United States	3:31.8
Sprint	Standing	Alexandr Kolyadin; Kazakhstan	4:19.7	Yoshihiro Nitta; Japan	4:20.5	Mark Arendz; Canada	4:21.7
Sprint	Standing	Alexandr Kolyadin; Kazakhstan	4:19.7	Yoshihiro Nitta; Japan	4:20.5	Ilkka Tuomisto; Finland	4:21.7
7.5 kilometres	Sitting	Sin Eui-hyun; South Korea	22:28.4	Daniel Cnossen; United States	22:33.7	Maksym Yarovyi; Ukraine	22:39.9
10 kilometres	Visually impaired	Brian McKeever; Guide: Graham Nishikawa; Canada	23:17.8	Jake Adicoff; Guide: Sawyer Kesselheim; United States	24:31.3	Yury Holub; Guide: Dzmitry Budzilovich; Belarus	24:37.1
10 kilometres	Standing	Yoshihiro Nitta; Japan	24:06.8	Grygorii Vovchynskyi; Ukraine	24:15.5	Mark Arendz; Canada	24:27.1
15 kilometres	Sitting	Maksym Yarovyi; Ukraine	41:37.0	Daniel Cnossen; United States	42:20.7	Sin Eui-hyun; South Korea	42:28.9
20 kilometres freestyle	Visually impaired	Brian McKeever; Guide: Graham Nishikawa; Canada	46:02.4	Yury Holub; Guide: Dzmitry Budzilovich; Belarus	47:07.5	Thomas Clarion; Guide: Antoine Bollet; France	47:24.4
20 kilometres freestyle	Standing	Ihor Reptyukh; Ukraine	44:52.4	Benjamin Daviet; France	46:48.9	Håkon Olsrud; Norway	47:10.6

=== Relay events ===
Event	Gold		Silver		Bronze	
4 x 2.5 km Mixed Relay	Ukraine (UKR); Iurii Utkin; Guide: Ruslan Perekhoda; Liudmyla Liashenko; Iuliia Batenkova-Bauman; Oksana Shyshkova; Guide: Vitaliy Kazakov	24:31.9	Canada (CAN); Natalie Wilkie; Emily Young; Chris Klebl; Mark Arendz	25:21.9	Germany (GER); Andrea Eskau; Steffen Lehmker; Alexander Ehler	25:25.3
4 x 2.5 km Open Relay	France (FRA); Benjamin Daviet; Anthony Chalencon; Guide: Simon Valverde; Thomas Clarion; Guide: Antoine Bollet	22:46.6	Norway (NOR); Nils-Erik Ulset; Håkon Olsrud; Eirik Bye; Guide: Arvid Nelson	23:09.1	Canada (CAN); Collin Cameron; Brian McKeever; Guide: Graham Nishikawa	23:52.4

== See also ==
- Cross-country skiing at the 2018 Winter Olympics
- Multi-Medallists - cross-country IPC – Official website
