= Cross-country skiing at the 2022 Winter Paralympics – Women's 1.5 km sprint =

Women's 1.5 kilometre sprint at the XIII Paralympic Winter Games
- Paralympic cross-country skiing
- Dates: 9 March

Women's 1.5 kilometre sprint (visually impaired) at the XIII Paralympic Winter Games

Medalists
1st place, gold medalist(s)		Carina Edlinger; Guide: Josef Lorenz	Austria
2nd place, silver medalist(s)		Oksana Shyshkova; Guide: Andriy Marchenko	Ukraine
3rd place, bronze medalist(s)		Linn Kazmaier; Guide: Florian Baumann	Germany

Women's 1.5 kilometre sprint (standing) at the XIII Paralympic Winter Games

Medalists
1st place, gold medalist(s)		Natalie Wilkie	Canada
2nd place, silver medalist(s)		Vilde Nilsen	Norway
3rd place, bronze medalist(s)		Sydney Peterson	United States

Women's 1.5 kilometre sprint (sitting) at the XIII Paralympic Winter Games

Medalists
1st place, gold medalist(s)		Yang Hongqiong	China
2nd place, silver medalist(s)		Oksana Masters	United States
3rd place, bronze medalist(s)		Li Panpan	China

The Women's 1.5 kilometre sprint competition of the 2022 Winter Paralympics was held at the National Biathlon Center in Beijing on 9 March 2022.

== Medal table ==
Rank	Nation	Gold	Silver	Bronze	Total
1	China (CHN)*	1	0	1	2
2	Austria (AUT)	1	0	0	1
2	Canada (CAN)	1	0	0	1
4	United States (USA)	0	1	1	2
5	Norway (NOR)	0	1	0	1
5	Ukraine (UKR)	0	1	0	1
7	Germany (GER)	0	0	1	1
Totals (7 entries)		3	3	3	9

== 1.5 km sprint visually impaired ==
In the cross-country skiing visually impaired, the athlete with a visual impairment has a sighted guide. The two skiers are considered a team, and dual medals are awarded.

=== Qualifications ===
Rank	Bib	Name	Country	Time	Difference	Notes
1	131	Carina Edlinger; Guide: Lorenz Joseph Lampl	Austria	3:23.38	–	Q
2	134	Linn Kazmaier; Guide: Florian Baumann	Germany	3:25.09	+1.71	Q
3	132	Oksana Shyshkova; Guide: Andriy Marchenko	Ukraine	3:33.18	+9.80	Q
4	133	Leonie Maria Walter; Guide: Pirmin Strecker	Germany	3:35.34	+11.96	Q
5	136	Johanna Recktenwald; Guide: Valentin Haag	Germany	3:36.66	+13.28	Q
6	137	Yang Qianru; Guide: Yu H.	China	3:43.00	+19.62	Q
7	135	Wang Yue; Guide: Li Yalin	China	3:46.19	+22.81	Q
8	138	Nataliia Tkachenko; Guide: Denys Nikulin	Ukraine	3:46.58	+23.20	Q
9	139	Aneta Górska; Guide: Catherine Spierenburg	Poland	4:05.24	+41.86	
10	140	Elaheh Gholifallah; Guide: F. Rezasoltani	Iran	7:09.45	+3:46.07	

=== Semifinal 1 ===
Rank	Bib	Name	Country	Time	Difference	Notes
1	131	Carina Edlinger; Guide: Lorenz Joseph Lampl	Austria	4:08.0	–	Q
2	133	Leonie Maria Walter; Guide: Pirmin Strecker	Germany	4:09.0	+1.00	Q
3	136	Johanna Recktenwald; Guide: Valentin Haag	Germany	4:12.2	+4.20	
4	138	Nataliia Tkachenko; Guide: Denys Nikulin	Ukraine	4:13.5	+5.50	

=== Semifinal 2 ===
Rank	Bib	Name	Country	Time	Difference	Notes
1	134	Linn Kazmaier; Guide: Florian Baumann	Germany	3:57.6	–	Q
2	132	Oksana Shyshkova; Guide: Andriy Marchenko	Ukraine	3:58.1	+0.50	Q
3	135	Wang Yue; Guide: Li Yalin	China	3:59.9	+2.30	
4	137	Yang Qianru; Guide: Yu H.	China	4:23.7	+26.10	

=== Final ===
Rank	Bib	Name	Country	Time	Difference
1st place, gold medalist(s)	131	Carina Edlinger; Guide: Lorenz Joseph Lampl	Austria	3:49.6	–
2nd place, silver medalist(s)	133	Oksana Shyshkova; Guide: Andriy Marchenko	Ukraine	3:56.4	+6.8
3rd place, bronze medalist(s)	132	Linn Kazmaier; Guide: Florian Baumann	Germany	4:26.0	+15.6
4	134	Leoni Maria Walter; Guide: Pirmin Strecker	Germany	4:39.2	+28.8

== 1.5 km sprint standing ==
=== Qualifications ===
Rank	Bib	Name	Country	Time	Difference	Notes
1	94	Natalie Wilkie	Canada	3:11.87	–	Q
2	91	Vilde Nilsen	Norway	3:13.11	+1.24	Q
3	95	Sydney Peterson	United States	3:16.63	+4.76	Q
4	93	Oleksandra Kononova	Ukraine	3:16.76	+4.89	Q
5	99	Zhao Zhiqing	China	3:17.28	+5.41	Q
6	92	Liudmyla Liashenko	Ukraine	3:17.54	+5.67	Q
7	100	Guo Yujie	China	3:23.98	+12.11	Q
8	98	Dani Aravich	United States	3:25.43	+13.56	Q
9	97	Iweta Faron	Poland	3:27.48	+15.61	Q
10	103	Li Huiling	China	3:41.34	+29.47	Q
11	102	Huang Bangjuan	China	3:44.15	+32.28	Q
12	101	Yurika Abe	Japan	3:46.04	+34.17	Q
13	105	Wang Ruo	China	3:53.19	+41.32	
14	106	Grace Miller	United States	3:54.17	+42.30	
15	104	Mika Iwamoto	Japan	4:11.96	+1:00.09	
	96	Bohdana Konashuk	Ukraine	DNS		

=== Semifinal 1 ===
Rank	Bib	Name	Country	Time	Difference	Notes
1	37	Natalie Wilkie	Canada	4:11.0	–	Q
2	40	Oleksandra Kononova	Ukraine	4:20.2	+9.2	Q
3	41	Zhao Zhiqing	China	4:21.8	+10.8	Q
4	44	Dani Aravich	United States	4:31.6	+20.6	
5	45	Iweta Faron	Poland	4:53.7	+42.7	
6	48	Yurika Abe	Japan	4:57.1	+46.1	

=== Semifinal 2 ===
Rank	Bib	Name	Country	Time	Difference	Notes
1	38	Vilde Nilsen	Norway	4:24.0	–	Q
2	39	Sydney Peterson	United States	4:26.1	+2.1	Q
3	42	Liudmyla Liashenko	Ukraine	4:32.1	+8.1	Q
4	43	Guo Yujie	China	5:00.0	+36.0	
5	46	Li Huiling	China	5:09.0	+45.0	
6	47	Huang Bangjuan	China	5:17.7	+53.7	

=== Final ===
Rank	Bib	Name	Country	Time	Difference
1st place, gold medalist(s)	37	Natalie Wilkie	Canada	4:05.1	–
2nd place, silver medalist(s)	38	Vilde Nilsen	Norway	4:08.1	+3.0
3rd place, bronze medalist(s)	39	Sydney Peterson	United States	4:12.1	+7.0
4	41	Zhao Zhiqing	China	4:21.5	+16.4
5	40	Oleksandra Kononova	Ukraine	4:26.1	+21.0
6	42	Liudmyla Liashenko	Ukraine	4:30.1	+25.0

== 1.5 km sprint sitting ==
=== Qualifications ===
Rank	Bib	Name	Country	Time	Difference	Notes
1	41	Oksana Masters	United States	2:42.54	–	Q
2	49	Li Panpan	China	2:42.59	+0.05	Q
3	55	Yang Hongqiong	China	2:45.08	+2.54	Q
4	42	Kendall Gretsch	United States	2:47.71	+5.17	Q
5	48	Ma Jing	China	2:50.42	+7.88	Q
6	43	Anja Wicker	Germany	2:52.27	+9.73	Q
7	45	Birgit Skarstein	Norway	2:56.94	+14.40	Q
8	50	Wang Shiyu	China	2:57.03	+14.49	Q
9	44	Aline Rocha	Brazil	2:59.49	+16.95	Q
10	46	Christina Picton	Canada	3:03.47	+20.93	Q
11	51	Chu Beibei	China	3:04.90	+22.36	Q
12	47	Indira Liseth	Norway	3:10.40	+27.86	Q
13	56	Monika Kukla	Poland	3:11.66	+29.12	
14	52	Lera Doederlein	United States	3:15.62	+33.08	
15	54	Anastasiia Laletina	Ukraine	3:17.25	+34.71	
16	58	Erin Martin	United States	3:27.35	+44.81	
17	57	Hope Gordon	Great Britain	3:35.04	+52.50	
18	53	Lyne-Marie Bilodeau	Canada	3:46.30	+1:03.76	

=== Semifinal 1 ===
Rank	Bib	Name	Country	Time	Difference	Notes
1	13	Oksana Masters	United States	3:26.2	–	Q
2	16	Kendall Gretsch	United States	3:34.5	+8.3	Q
3	20	Wang Shiyu	China	3:35.9	+9.7	Q
4	17	Ma Jing	China	3:40.9	+14.7	
5	21	Aline Rocha	Brazil	3:55.2	+29.0	
6	24	Indira Liseth	Norway	4:14.6	+48.4	

=== Semifinal 2 ===
Rank	Bib	Name	Country	Time	Difference	Notes
1	15	Yang Hongqiong	China	3:35.0	–	Q
2	14	Li Panpan	China	3:40.0	+5.0	Q
3	22	Christina Picton	Canada	3:45.8	+10.8	Q
4	23	Chu Beibei	China	3:46.4	+11.4	
5	19	Birgit Skarstein	Norway	3:48.6	+13.6	
6	18	Anja Wicker	Germany	3:55.2	+20.2	

=== Final ===
Rank	Bib	Name	Country	Time	Difference
1st place, gold medalist(s)	15	Yang Hongqiong	China	3:18.2	–
2nd place, silver medalist(s)	13	Oksana Masters	United States	3:19.9	+1.70
3rd place, bronze medalist(s)	14	Li Panpan	China	3:31.0	+12.8
4	20	Wang Shiyu	China	3:31.3	+13.1
5	16	Kendall Gretsch	United States	3:37.3	+19.1
6	22	Christina Picton	Canada	3:38.6	+20.4

== See also ==
- Cross-country skiing at the 2022 Winter Olympics
