= Para biathlon at the 2026 Winter Paralympics – Women's sprint pursuit =

Women's pursuit at the XIV Paralympic Winter Games
- Paralympic biathlon
- Venue: Tesero Cross-Country Skiing Stadium.
- Dates: 13 March

Women's pursuit (visually impaired) at the XIV Paralympic Winter Games

Medalists
1st place, gold medalist(s)		Carina Edlingerová; Guide: Alexandr Paťava	Czech Republic
2nd place, silver medalist(s)		Wang Yue; Guide: Chen Guoming	China
3rd place, bronze medalist(s)		Simona Bubeníčková; Guide: David Šrůtek	Czech Republic
3rd place, bronze medalist(s)		Leonie Walter; Guide: Christian Krasman	Germany

Women's pursuit (standing) at the XIV Paralympic Winter Games

Medalists
1st place, gold medalist(s)		Natalie Wilkie	Canada
2nd place, silver medalist(s)		Iryna Bui	Ukraine
3rd place, bronze medalist(s)		Oleksandra Kononova	Ukraine

Women's pursuit (sitting) at the XIV Paralympic Winter Games

Medalists
1st place, gold medalist(s)		Kendall Gretsch	United States
2nd place, silver medalist(s)		Kim Yun-ji	South Korea
3rd place, bronze medalist(s)		Anja Wicker	Germany

The women's pursuit competition of the 2026 Winter Paralympics will take place on 13 March 2026 at the Tesero Cross-Country Skiing Stadium.

== Medal table ==
* Host nation (Italy)

Rank	Nation	Gold	Silver	Bronze	Total
1	Czech Republic (CZE)	1	0	1	2
2	Canada (CAN)	1	0	0	1
2	United States (USA)	1	0	0	1
4	Ukraine (UKR)	0	1	1	2
5	China (CHN)	0	1	0	1
5	South Korea (KOR)	0	1	0	1
7	Germany (GER)	0	0	2	2
Totals (7 entries)		3	3	4	10

== Visually impaired ==
In the biathlon visually impaired, the athlete with a visual impairement has a sighted guide. The two skiers are considered a team, and dual medals are awarded.

Ranking	Name	Country	Qualification			Final		
Ranking	Name	Country	Misses	Time	Difference	Misses	Time	Difference
1st place, gold medalist(s)	Carina Edlingerová; Guide:Alexandr Patava	Czech Republic	1	11:47.8	0	3	13:38.1	0
2nd place, silver medalist(s)	Wang Yue; Guide:Chen Guoming	China	3	12:22.6	+34.8	1	13:48.0	+9.9
3rd place, bronze medalist(s)	Simona Bubeníčková; Guide:David Srutek	Czech Republic	3	12:17.1	+29.3	1	13:59.2	+21.1
3rd place, bronze medalist(s)	Leonie Maria Walter; Guide:Christian Krasman	Germany	1	12:18.8	+31.0	1	13:59.2	+21.1
5	Johanna Recktenwald; Guide:Adrian Schuler	Germany	1	12:40.8	+53.0	1	14:44.0	+1:05.9
6	Linn Kazmaier; Guide:Florian Baumann	Germany	0	12:37.2	+49.4	1	14:56.4	+1:18.3
7	Oksana Shyshkova; Guide:Artem Kazarian	Ukraine	1	13:15.6	+1:27.8	0	15:26.9	+1:48.8
8	Cong Jihong; Guide:Liu Jiaxuan	China	1	13:18.9	+1:31.1	1	15:51.7	+2:13.6
9	Ilona Varkovets; Guide:Daryna Kovalova	Ukraine	2	13:14.4	+1:26.6	1	15:56.3	+2:18.2
10	Oleksandra Danylenko; Guide:Mykyta Stakhurskyi	Ukraine	1	13:01.0	+1:13.2	0	16:13.5	+2:35.4
11	Romana Lobasheva; Guide:Anastasiia Shubaldina	Ukraine	3	13:56.0	+2:08.2	4	18:19.6	+4:41.5
12	Yang Qianru; Guide:Wang Guanyu	China	3	15:02.7	+3:14.9	1	19:31.9	+5:53.8
13	Taryn Dickens; Guide:Lynn Maree Cullen	Australia	3	20:28.1	+8:40.3	DNQ		

== Standing ==
Ranking	Name	Country	Qualification			Final		
Ranking	Name	Country	Misses	Time	Difference	Misses	Time	Difference
1st place, gold medalist(s)	Natalie Wilkie	Canada	0	10:54.8	+10.5	0	12:18.0	+0.0
2nd place, silver medalist(s)	Iryna Bui	Ukraine	0	10:49.7	+5.4	1	12:35.7	+17.7
3rd place, bronze medalist(s)	Oleksandra Kononova	Ukraine	2	11:11.7	+27.4	2	12:49.0	+31.0
4	Sydney Peterson	United States	0	10:59.6	+15.3	2	12:57.7	+39.7
5	Zhao Zhiqing	China	0	10:44.3	+0.0	4	13:35.4	+1:17.4
6	Liudmyla Liashenko	Ukraine	5	11:47.5	+1:03.2	2	13:36.5	+1:18.5
7	Bohdana Konashuk	Ukraine	1	11:14.2	+29.9	2	13:38.2	+1:20.2
8	Guo Yujie	China	1	11:16.2	+31.9	3	13:41.5	+1:23.5
9	Brittany Hudak	Canada	1	11:34.8	+50.5	1	13:51	+1:33.3
10	Danielle Aravich	United States	3	12:12.6	+1:28.3	DNS		
11	Abe Yurika	Japan	5	14:07.5	+3:23.2	DNQ		

== Sitting ==
Ranking	Name	Country	Qualification			Final		
Ranking	Name	Country	Misses	Time	Difference	Misses	Time	Difference
1st place, gold medalist(s)	Kendall Gretsch	United States	0	9:29.1	+0.0	0	11:33.1	+0.0
2nd place, silver medalist(s)	Kim Yun-ji	South Korea	1	9:29.8	+0.7	2	11:41.6	+8.5
3rd place, bronze medalist(s)	Anja Wicker	Germany	4	10:45.3	+1:16.2	0	12:39.1	+1:06.0
4	Wang Shiyu	China	2	10:34.1	+1:05.0	1	13:10.5	+1:37.4
5	Zhai Yuxin	China	1	10:52.6	+1:23.5	0	13:26.9	+1:53.8
6	Oksana Masters	United States	4	10:53.8	+1:24.7	3	13:51.1	+2:18.0
7	Andrea Eskau	Germany	1	10:45.3	+1:16.2	2	14:26.6	+2:53.5
8	Shan Yilin	China	2	11:33.7	+2:04.6	2	15:42.9	+4:09.8
9	Han Seunghee	South Korea	2	11:33.7	+2:04.6	1	16:11.5	+4:38.4
10	Lauren Parker	Australia	2	11:22.4	+1:53.3	2	16:12.5	+4:39.4
11	Erin Martin	United States	1	11:36.1	+2:07.0	2	17:37.5	+6:09.1
12	Elena Regina de Sena Souza	Brazil	0	12:12.2	+2:43.1	3	17:42.2	+6:09.1

== See also ==
- Biathlon at the 2026 Winter Olympics
