= Para biathlon at the 2026 Winter Paralympics – Women's sprint =

Women's sprint at the XIV Paralympic Winter Games
- Paralympic biathlon
- Venue: Tesero Cross-Country Skiing Stadium.
- Dates: 7 March
- Competitors: 39 from 9 nations

Women's sprint (visually impaired) at the XIV Paralympic Winter Games
- Competitors: 14 from 6 nations

Medalists
1st place, gold medalist(s)		Wang Yue; Guide: Chen Guoming	China
2nd place, silver medalist(s)		Carina Edlingerová; Guide: Alexandr Patava	Czech Republic
3rd place, bronze medalist(s)		Leonie Maria Walter; Guide: Christian Krasman	Germany

Women's sprint (standing) at the XIV Paralympic Winter Games
- Competitors: 11 from 5 nations

Medalists
1st place, gold medalist(s)		Oleksandra Kononova	Ukraine
2nd place, silver medalist(s)		Natalie Wilkie	Canada
3rd place, bronze medalist(s)		Liudmyla Liashenko	Ukraine

Women's sprint (sitting) at the XIV Paralympic Winter Games
- Competitors: 14 from 7 nations

Medalists
1st place, gold medalist(s)		Oksana Masters	United States
2nd place, silver medalist(s)		Kendall Gretsch	United States
3rd place, bronze medalist(s)		Anja Wicker	Germany

The women's sprint competition of the 2026 Winter Paralympics took place on 7 March 2026 at the Tesero Cross-Country Skiing Stadium.

== Medal table ==
* Host nation (Italy)

Rank	Nation	Gold	Silver	Bronze	Total
1	United States (USA)	1	1	0	2
2	Ukraine (UKR)	1	0	1	2
3	China (CHN)	1	0	0	1
4	Canada (CAN)	0	1	0	1
4	Czech Republic (CZE)	0	1	0	1
6	Germany (GER)	0	0	2	2
Totals (6 entries)		3	3	3	9

== Visually impaired ==
In the biathlon visually impaired, the athlete with a visual impairement has a sighted guide. The two skiers are considered a team, and dual medals are awarded.

Rank	Bib	Name	Country	Misses	Real time	Calculated Time	Difference
1st place, gold medalist(s)	113	Wang Yue; Guide: Chen Guoming	China	1	20:29.4	19:52.5	
2nd place, silver medalist(s)	114	Carina Edlingerová; Guide: Alexandr Paťava	Czech Republic	0	20:58.2	20:20.5	+28.8
3rd place, bronze medalist(s)	112	Leonie Walter; Guide: Christian Krasman	Germany	0	21:10.3	20:32.2	+40.9
4	111	Simona Bubeníčková; Guide: David Šrůtek	Czech Republic	0	23:58.9	21:06.2	+1:23.8
5	110	Johanna Recktenwald; Guide: Emily Weiss	Germany	0	21:57.3	21:17.8	+1:27.9
6	107	Oksana Shyshkova; Guide: Artem Kazarian	Ukraine	0	22:07.5	22:07.5	+2:15.0
7	108	Linn Kazmaier; Guide: Florian Baumann	Germany	0	22:58.3	22:58.3	+3:05.8
8	109	Cong Jihong; Guide: Liu Jiaxuan	China	2	23:05.2	23:05.2	+3:12.7
9	105	Ilona Varkovets; Guide: Daryna Kovalova	Ukraine	1	23:26.9	23:26.9	+3:34.4
10	102	Maddie Mullin; Guide: Brooke Ailey	Canada	2	24:50.0	24:50.0	+4:57.5
11	106	Oleksanda Danylenko; Guide: Mykyta Stakhurskyi	Ukraine	4	28:18.3	24:54.5	+5:43.2
12	103	Romana Lobasheva; Guide: Anastassia Shabaldina	Ukraine	4	25:29.0	25:29.0	+5:36.5
13	101	Yang Qianru; Guide: Wang Guanyu	China	1	25:32.1	25:32.1	+5:39.6
14	104	Taryn Dickens; Guide: Lynn Maree Cullen	Australia	3	35:10.1	35:10.1	+15:17.6

== Standing ==
Rank	Bib	Name	Country	Misses	Real time	Calculated Time	Difference
1st place, gold medalist(s)	58	Oleksandra Kononova	Ukraine	0	19:28.2	18:41.5	
2nd place, silver medalist(s)	57	Natalie Wilkie	Canada	0	19:33.3	18:46.4	+5.1
3rd place, bronze medalist(s)	52	Liudmyla Liashenko	Ukraine	1	20:02.0	19:13.9	+33.8
4	53	Sydney Peterson	United States	3	21:43.2	19:19.8	+43.1
5	60	Iryna Bui	Ukraine	0	20:19.8	19:31.0	+51.6
6	55	Brittany Hudak	Canada	0	20:32.6	19:43.3	+1:04.4
7	61	Guo Yujie	China	0	21:02.8	20:12.3	+1:34.6
8	59	Zhao Zhiqing	China	2	22:29.7	20:14.7	+1:43.6
9	54	Bohdana Konashuk	Ukraine	2	21:32.7	20:41.0	+2:04.5
10	56	Danielle Aravich	United States	2	22:10.9	21:17.7	+2:42.7
11	51	Yurika Abe	Japan	7	28:04.3	26:40.1	+8:23.8

== Sitting ==
Rank	Bib	Name	Country	Misses	Real time	Calculated Time	Difference
1st place, gold medalist(s)	11	Oksana Masters	United States	0	21:21.3	21:21.3	
2nd place, silver medalist(s)	12	Kendall Gretsch	United States	0	22:31.4	21:37.3	+16.7
3rd place, bronze medalist(s)	14	Anja Wicker	Germany	2	26:12.6	22:32.4	+1:22.7
4	13	Kim Yun-ji	South Korea	4	26:04.4	22:41.0	+1:31.6
5	9	Zhai Yuxin	China	0	23:20.5	23:20.5	+1:59.2
6	6	Shan Yilin	China	0	23:40.1	23:40.1	+2:18.8
7	5	Aline Rocha	Brazil	2	27:24.4	23:50.6	+2:51.6
8	7	Andrea Eskau	Germany	0	25:45.2	23:57.0	+2:47.5
9	10	Wang Shiyu	China	1	24:18.1	24:18.1	+2:56.8
10	3	Christina Picton	Canada	0	24:31.9	24:31.9	+3:10.6
12	2	Han Seung-hee	South Korea	0	29:55.0	25:43.7	+5:05.1
13	1	Lauren Parker	Australia	4	31:01.2	26:40.6	+6:11.3
14	4	Elena de Sena	Brazil	1	27:43.2	27:43.2	+6:21.9

== See also ==
- Biathlon at the 2026 Winter Olympics
