= Cross-country skiing at the 2022 Winter Paralympics =

Cross-country skiing at the XIII Paralympic Winter Games
- Venue: National Biathlon Center
- Dates: 6–13 March
- Competitors: 141 from 25 nations

Cross-country skiing was one of the competitions at the 2022 Winter Paralympics in Beijing, China. In total, 20 medal events were held.

== Medal summary ==
=== Medal table ===
The ranking in the table is based on information provided by the International Paralympic Committee (IPC) and will be consistent with IPC convention in its published medal tables. By default, the table will be ordered by the number of gold medals the athletes from a nation have won (in this context, a "nation" is an entity represented by a National Paralympic Committee). The number of silver medals is taken into consideration next and then the number of bronze medals. If nations are still tied, equal ranking is given and they are listed alphabetically by IPC country code.

* Host nation (China)

Rank	Nation	Gold	Silver	Bronze	Total
1	China (CHN)*	7	6	5	18
2	Canada (CAN)	5	1	4	10
3	Ukraine (UKR)	3	1	3	7
4	United States (USA)	1	6	1	8
5	Germany (GER)	1	2	2	5
6	France (FRA)	1	2	0	3
7	Austria (AUT)	1	0	1	2
8	Japan (JPN)	1	0	0	1
9	Sweden (SWE)	0	1	2	3
10	Norway (NOR)	0	1	1	2
11	Italy (ITA)	0	0	1	1
Totals (11 entries)		20	20	20	60

=== Women's events ===
Event	Class	Gold		Silver		Bronze	
Sprint	Visually impaired	Carina Edlinger; Guide: Josef Lorenz; Austria	3:49.6	Oksana Shyshkova; Guide: Andriy Marchenko; Ukraine	3:56.4	Linn Kazmaier; Guide: Florian Baumann; Germany	4:05.2
Sprint	Sitting	Yang Hongqiong; China	3:18.2	Oksana Masters; United States	3:19.9	Li Panpan; China	3:31.0
Sprint	Standing	Natalie Wilkie; Canada	4:05.1	Vilde Nilsen; Norway	4:08.1	Sydney Peterson; United States	4:12.1
7.5 kilometres	Sitting	Yang Hongqiong; China	24:47.5	Oksana Masters; United States	25:24.7	Ma Jing; China	26:22.9
10 kilometres	Visually impaired	Linn Kazmaier; Guide: Florian Baumann; Germany	41:40.8	Wang Yue; Guide: Li Yalin; China	42:20.3	Carina Edlinger; Guide: Josef Lorenz; Austria	43:13.9
10 kilometres	Standing	Oleksandra Kononova; Ukraine	41:18.0	Natalie Wilkie; Canada	41:45.3	Iryna Bui; Ukraine	41:47.1
15 kilometres	Sitting	Yang Hongqiong; China	43:06.7	Oksana Masters; United States	43:38.8	Li Panpan; China	45:17.0
15 kilometres freestyle	Visually impaired	Oksana Shyshkova; Guide: Andriy Marchenko; Ukraine	51:09.1	Linn Kazmaier; Guide: Florian Baumann; Germany	52:05.6	Leonie Maria Walter; Guide: Pirmin Strecker; Germany	54:08.8
15 kilometres freestyle	Standing	Natalie Wilkie; Canada	48:04.8	Sydney Peterson; United States	49:00.2	Brittany Hudak; Canada	49:27.8

=== Men's events ===
Event	Class	Gold		Silver		Bronze	
Sprint	Visually impaired	Brian McKeever; Guide: Russell Kennedy; Canada	3:19.5	Jake Adicoff; Guide: Sam Wood; United States	3:20.3	Zebastian Modin; Guide: Emil Jönsson; Sweden	3:37.8
Sprint	Sitting	Zheng Peng; China	2:42.4	Mao Zhongwu; China	2:44.9	Collin Cameron; Canada	2:46.3
Sprint	Standing	Benjamin Daviet; France	3:07.5	Marco Maier; Germany	3:08.8	Grygorii Vovchynskyi; Ukraine	3:09.3
10 kilometres	Sitting	Mao Zhongwu; China	29:10.7	Zheng Peng; China	30:08.4	Giuseppe Romele; Italy	31:42.5
12.5 kilometres	Visually impaired	Brian McKeever; Guide: Russell Kennedy; Canada	33:06.6	Zebastian Modin; Guide: Emil Jönsson; Sweden	33:59.1	Dmytro Suiarko; Guide: Oleksandr Nikonovych; Ukraine	34:08.1
12.5 kilometres	Standing	Wang Chenyang; China	33:07.8	Benjamin Daviet; France	33:09.1	Cai Jiayun; China	33:18.0
18 kilometres	Sitting	Zheng Peng; China	43:09.2	Mao Zhongwu; China	43:23.8	Collin Cameron; Canada	47:36.6
20 kilometres classical	Visually impaired	Brian McKeever; Guide: Russell Kennedy; Canada	55:36.7	Jake Adicoff; Guide: Sam Wood; United States	58:54.4	Zebastian Modin; Guide: Emil Jönsson; Sweden	1:00:05.4
20 kilometres classical	Standing	Taiki Kawayoke; Japan	52:52.8	Cai Jiayun; China	54:27.7	Qiu Mingyang; China	54:29.7

=== Relay events ===
Event	Gold		Silver		Bronze	
4 × 2.5 km Mixed Relay	United States (USA); Oksana Masters; Sydney Peterson; Daniel Cnossen; Jake Adicoff; Guide: Sam Wood	25:59.3	China (CHN); Shan Yilin; Wang Chenyang; Zheng Peng; Cai Jiayun	26:25.3	Canada (CAN); Collin Cameron; Emily Young; Mark Arendz; Natalie Wilkie	27:00.6
4 × 2.5 km Open Relay	Ukraine (UKR); Dmytro Suiarko; Guide: Oleksandr Nikonovych; Grygorii Vovchynskyi; Vasyl Kravchuk; Anatolii Kovalevskyi; Guide: Oleksandr Mukshyn	28:05.3	France (FRA); Benjamin Daviet; Anthony Chalençon; Guide: Alexandre Pouye; Guide: Brice Ottonello	28:30.4	Norway (NOR); Kjartan Haugen; Vilde Nilsen; Thomas Oxaal; Guide: Ole-Martin Lid	28:41.0

== Participating nations ==
- Argentina (1)
- Austria (1)
- Azerbaijan (1)
- Brazil (5)
- Canada (10)
- China (32)
- Croatia (1)
- Finland (1)
- France (2)
- Georgia (1)
- Germany (8)
- Great Britain (5)
- Iran (2)
- Italy (3)
- Japan (9)
- Kazakhstan (5)
- Mongolia (2)
- Norway (5)
- Poland (8)
- South Korea (3)
- Spain (1)
- Sweden (1)
- Switzerland (1)
- Ukraine (19)
- United States (14)

== See also ==
- Cross-country skiing at the 2022 Winter Olympics
