= Cross-country skiing at the 2018 Winter Paralympics – 4 × 2.5 kilometre mixed relay =

Mixed relay at the XII Paralympic Winter Games
- Paralympic cross-country skiing
- Venue: Alpensia Biathlon Centre, South Korea
- Dates: 18 March
- Competitors: 45 from 13 nations
- Teams: 13
- Winning time: 24:31.9

Medalists
1st place, gold medalist(s)		Iurii Utkin; Guide: Ruslan Perekhoda; Liudmyla Liashenko; Iuliia Batenkova-Bauman; Oksana Shyshkova; Guide: Vitaliy Kazakov	Ukraine
2nd place, silver medalist(s)		Natalie Wilkie; Emily Young; Chris Klebl; Mark Arendz	Canada
3rd place, bronze medalist(s)		Andrea Eskau; Steffen Lehmker; Alexander Ehler	Germany

The 4 × 2.5 kilometre mixed relay competition of the 2018 Winter Paralympics was held at the Alpensia Biathlon Centre in Pyeongchang. The competition took place on 18 March 2018.

== Results ==
Rank	Bib	Country	Time	Deficit
1st place, gold medalist(s)	1	Ukraine; Iurii Utkin; Guide: Ruslan Perekhoda; Liudmyla Liashenko; Iuliia Batenkova-Bauman; Oksana Shyshkova; Guide: Vitaliy Kazakov	24:31.9; 5:12.8 5:43.2; 7:47.6; 5:48.3	
2nd place, silver medalist(s)	6	Canada; Natalie Wilkie; Emily Young; Chris Klebl; Mark Arendz	25:21.9; 6:41.8; 5:58.0; 7:34.3; 5:07.8	+50.0
3rd place, bronze medalist(s)	2	Germany; Andrea Eskau; Steffen Lehmker; Andrea Eskau; Alexander Ehler	25:25.3; 7:13.7; 5:02.9; 7:51.8; 5:17.5	+53.4
4	3	Japan; Yoshihiro Nitta; Momoko Dekijima; Yurika Abe; Taiki Kawayoke	25:48.0; 5:30.3; 6:21.0; 8:04.6; 5:52.1	+1:16.1
5	4	Belarus; Yauheni Lukyanenka; Sviatlana Sakhanenka; Guide: Raman Yashchanka; Valiantsina Shyts; Vasili Shaptsiaboi; Guide: Yuryi Liadau	25:51.2; 6:20.4; 5:29.3 8:46.9; 5:14.6	+1:19.3
6	7	Neutral Paralympic Athletes; Marta Zainullina; Anna Milenina; Irina Guliaeva; Mikhalina Lysova; Guide: Alexey Ivanov	26:06.8; 7:02.1; 5:32.9; 7:51.8; 5:40.0	+1:34.9
7	10	United States; Kendall Gretsch; Ruslan Reiter; Kendall Gretsch; Jake Adicoff; Guide: Sawyer Kesselheim	26:07.6; 7:56.5; 5:27.6; 7:57.8; 4:45.7	+1:35.7
8	5	Norway; Trygve Steinar Larsen; Johannes Birkelund; Birgit Skarstein; Vilde Nilsen	27:01.4; 6:09.4; 6:30.1; 8:26.4; 5:55.5	+2:29.5
9	8	China; Chu Beibei; Du Haitao; Zheng Peng; Wu Junbao	27:06.5; 7:31.2; 5:34.2; 7:56.6; 6:04.5	+2:34.6
10	11	Finland; Sini Pyy; Inkki Inola; Guide: Vili Sormunen; Sini Pyy; Ilkka Tuomisto	28:11.0; 8:15.7; 5:07.6 9:20.1; 5:27.6	+3:39.1
11	13	South Korea; Seo Vo-ra-mi; Choi Bo-gue; Guide: Kim Hyun-woo; Lee Do-yeon; Choi Bo-gue; Guide: Kim Hyun-woo	30:10.2; 9:22.4; 5:46.8 8:52.8; 6:08.2	+5:38.3
12	9	Kazakhstan; Zhanyl Baltabayeva; Kairat Kanafin; Guide: Anton Zhdanovich; Zhanyl Baltabayeva; Sergey Ussoltsev	31:41.2; 8:33.0; 5:35.8 9:28.4; 8:04.0	+7:09.3
13	12	Brazil; Aline Rocha; Cristian Ribera; Aline Rocha; Cristian Ribera	32:16.7; 8:18.7; 7:01.2; 9:28.3; 7:28.5	+7:44.8

== See also ==
- Cross-country skiing at the 2018 Winter Olympics
