= Norway at the 2022 Winter Paralympics =

- Flag of Norway
- IPC code: NOR
- NPC: Norwegian Olympic and Paralympic Committee and Confederation of Sports
- Website: www.idrett.no (in Norwegian)

in Beijing, China 4 March 2022 – 13 March 2022
- Competitors: 13 (8 men and 5 women)
- Medals Ranked 8th: Gold 4 Silver 2 Bronze 1 Total 7

Winter Paralympics appearances (overview)
- 1976; 1980; 1984; 1988; 1992; 1994; 1998; 2002; 2006; 2010; 2014; 2018; 2022; 2026

Norway competed at the 2022 Winter Paralympics in Beijing, China which took place between 4–13 March 2022.

== Medalists ==
The following Norwegian competitors won medals at the games. In the discipline sections below, the medalists' names are bolded.

Medal	Name	Sport	Event	Date
Gold	Jesper Pedersen	Alpine skiing	Men's slalom, sitting	13 March
Gold	Jesper Pedersen	Alpine skiing	Men's giant slalom, sitting	10 March
Gold	Jesper Pedersen	Alpine skiing	Men's super combined, sitting	7 March
Gold	Jesper Pedersen	Alpine skiing	Men's super-G, sitting	6 March
Silver	Vilde Nilsen	Cross-country skiing	Women's sprint, standing	9 March
Silver	Jesper Pedersen	Alpine skiing	Men's downhill, sitting	5 March
Bronze	Kjartan Haugen; Vilde Nilsen; Thomas Oxaal; Guide: Ole-Martin Lid	Cross-country skiing	Open 4 × 2.5 kilometre relay	13 March

**Medals by sport**
**Sport**	1st place, gold medalist(s)	2nd place, silver medalist(s)	3rd place, bronze medalist(s)	**Total**
Alpine skiing	4	1	0	**5**
Cross-country	0	1	1	**2**
**Total**	**4**	**2**	**1**	**7**

**Medals by gender**
**Gender**	1st place, gold medalist(s)	2nd place, silver medalist(s)	3rd place, bronze medalist(s)	**Total**
Male	4	1	0	**5**
Female	0	1	0	**1**
Mixed	0	0	1	**1**
**Total**	**4**	**2**	**1**	**7**

== Administration ==
Cato Zahl Pedersen served as Chef de Mission.

== Competitors ==
The following is the list of number of competitors participating at the Games per sport/discipline.

Sport	Men	Women	Total
Alpine skiing	2	0	2
Biathlon	1	0	1
Cross-country skiing	2	3	5
Wheelchair curling	3	2	5
Total	8	5	13

== Alpine skiing ==
Norway competed in alpine skiing.

Men

Athlete	Event	Run 1		Run 2		Total	
Athlete	Event	Time	Rank	Time	Rank	Time	Rank
Jesper Pedersen	Downhill, sitting	—N/a				1:17.99	2nd place, silver medalist(s)
Jesper Pedersen	Giant slalom, sitting	57.91	1	56.29	1	1:54.20	1st place, gold medalist(s)
Jesper Pedersen	Slalom, sitting	41.19	1	49.91	1	1:31.10	1st place, gold medalist(s)
Jesper Pedersen	Super combined, sitting	1:10.29	1	39.94	3	1:50.23	1st place, gold medalist(s)
Jesper Pedersen	Super-G, sitting	—N/a				1:09.69	1st place, gold medalist(s)
Marcus Nilsson Grasto	Giant slalom, standing	1:06.99	25	1:03.53	23	2:10.52	24
Marcus Nilsson Grasto	Slalom, standing	51.17	27	59.32	19	1:50.49	19
Marcus Nilsson Grasto	Super combined, standing	1:19.61	26	49.71	22	2:09.32	22
Marcus Nilsson Grasto	Super-G, standing	—N/a				1:21.04	30

== Biathlon skiing ==
One Norwegian athlete competed in biathlon.

Men

Athlete	Events	Final		
Athlete	Events	Missed Shots	Result	Rank
Nils-Erik Ulset	6 km, standing	2	18:30.6	7
Nils-Erik Ulset	10 km, standing	1	35:15.3	10
Nils-Erik Ulset	12.5 km, standing	2	45:24.3	8

== Cross-country skiing ==
Norway competed in cross-country skiing.

Men

Athlete	Event	Qualification		Semifinal		Final	
Athlete	Event	Result	Rank	Result	Rank	Result	Rank
Kjartan Haugen	1.5 km sprint, standing	2:54.51	10 Q	3:27.2	3 Q	3:28.8	6
Kjartan Haugen	20 km, standing	—N/a				59:29.8	10
Thomas Oxaal; Guide: Ole-Martin Lid	1.5 km sprint free, visually impaired	2:51.57	12	did not advance			
Thomas Oxaal; Guide: Ole-Martin Lid	12.5 km free, visually impaired	—N/a				37:35.6	9
Thomas Oxaal; Guide: Ole-Martin Lid	20 km classic, visually impaired	—N/a				DNS	

Women

Athlete	Event	Qualification		Semifinal		Final	
Athlete	Event	Result	Rank	Result	Rank	Result	Rank
Vilde Nilsen	1.5 km sprint, standing	3:13.11	2 Q	4:24.0	1 Q	4:08.1	2nd place, silver medalist(s)
Vilde Nilsen	10 km free, standing	—N/a				42:09.4	5
Vilde Nilsen	15 km classic, standing	—N/a				DNF	
Birgit Skarstein	1.5 km sprint, sitting	2:56.94	7 Q	3:48.6	5	Did not advance	
Birgit Skarstein	7.5 km, sitting	—N/a				28:35.9	7
Birgit Skarstein	15 km, sitting	—N/a				49:23.9	6
Indira Liseth	1.5 km sprint, sitting	3:10.40	12 Q	4:14.6	6	Did not advance	
Indira Liseth	7.5 km, sitting	—N/a				34:15.3	12
Indira Liseth	15 km, sitting	—N/a				54:09.2	8

Relay

Athletes	Event	Final	
Athletes	Event	Time	Rank
Kjartan Haugen; Vilde Nilsen; Kjartan Haugen; Thomas Oxaal; Guide: Ole-Martin Lid	4 x 2.5 km open relay	28:41.0	3rd place, bronze medalist(s)

== Wheelchair curling ==
Norway competed in wheelchair curling.

Summary

Team	Event	Group stage											Semifinal	Final / BM	
Team	Event	Opposition Score	Opposition Score	Opposition Score	Opposition Score	Opposition Score	Opposition Score	Opposition Score	Opposition Score	Opposition Score	Opposition Score	Rank	Opposition Score	Opposition Score	Rank
Jostein Stordahl; Ole Fredrik Syversen; Geir Arne Skogstad; Sissel Løchen; Mia Sveberg	Mixed	GBR; W 7–5	SVK; W 9–3	KOR; L 4–9	EST; L 3–8	USA; L 5–6	LAT; W 8–6	SUI; W 8–5	SWE; L 6–8	CHN; L 4–7	CAN; L 7–6	7	Did not advance		

Round robin Final round-robin standings

Key
Teams to Playoffs

Country	Skip	W	L	W–L	PF	PA	EW	EL	BE	SE	S%	DSC
China	Wang Haitao	8	2	–	68	39	36	28	2	13	71%	122.32
Slovakia	Radoslav Ďuriš	7	3	2–0	65	57	40	33	1	16	65%	95.19
Sweden	Viljo Petersson-Dahl	7	3	1–1	66	52	37	35	3	18	68%	91.08
Canada	Mark Ideson	7	3	0–2	69	50	36	33	2	11	71%	95.29
United States	Matthew Thums	5	5	1–0	60	75	32	39	2	6	60%	70.98
South Korea	Go Seung-nam	5	5	0–1	64	59	35	37	0	11	64%	103.20
Norway	Jostein Stordahl	4	6	2–0	60	64	37	38	2	13	64%	107.82
Great Britain	Hugh Nibloe	4	6	1–1	67	56	37	36	0	16	62%	134.75
Latvia	Poļina Rožkova	4	6	0–2	61	71	40	32	0	18	63%	100.43
Estonia	Andrei Koitmäe	3	7	–	51	69	32	41	2	13	61%	106.21
Switzerland	Laurent Kneubühl	1	9	–	48	87	32	42	0	8	56%	109.27

Wheelchair curling round robin summary table
Pos.	Country	Canada	China	Estonia	Great Britain	Japan	Norway	Slovakia	South Korea	Sweden	Switzerland	United States	Record
4	Canada	—N/a	7–3	9–3	6–3	10–3	7–6	8–9	4–9	3–6	8–4	7–4	7–3
1	China	3–7	—	9–3	6–3	9–2	7–4	7–5	9–4	1–5	7–4	10–2	8–2
10	Estonia	3–9	3–9	—	5–10	6–5	8–3	6–7	2–5	4–6	8–6	6–9	3–7
8	Great Britain	3–6	3–6	10–5	—	8–4	5–7	3–7	6–8	4–6	15–1	10–6	4–6
9	Latvia	3–10	2–9	5–6	4–8	—	6–8	8–4	8–4	9–7	9–7	7–8	4–6
7	Norway	6–7	4–7	3–8	7–5	8–6	—	9–3	4–9	6–8	8–5	5–6	4–6
2	Slovakia	9–8	5–7	7–6	7–3	4–8	3–9	—	7–2	6–5	8–6	9–3	7–3
6	South Korea	9–4	4–9	5–2	8–6	4–8	9–4	2–7	—	10–4	7–8	6–7	5–5
3	Sweden	6–3	5–1	6–4	6–4	7–9	8–6	5–6	4–10	—	9–2	10–7	7–3
11	Switzerland	4–8	4–7	6–8	1–15	7–9	5–8	6–8	8–7	2–9	—	5–8	1–9
5	United States	4–7	2–10	9–6	6–10	8–7	6–5	3–9	7–6	7–10	8–5	—	5–5

Draw 1
Saturday, March 5, 14:35

Sheet D	1	2	3	4	5	6	7	8	Final
Norway (Stordahl)	0	2	2	0	0	1	2	0	7
Great Britain (Nibloe) 🔨	1	0	0	1	2	0	0	1	5

Draw 3
Sunday, March 6, 9:35

Sheet B	1	2	3	4	5	6	7	8	Final
Slovakia (Ďuriš)	0	0	0	0	3	0	0	X	3
Norway (Stordahl) 🔨	1	0	2	1	0	3	2	X	9

Draw 5
Sunday, March 6, 19:35

Sheet C	1	2	3	4	5	6	7	8	Final
South Korea (Go) 🔨	2	0	2	1	0	0	4	X	9
Norway (Stordahl)	0	2	0	0	1	1	0	X	4

Draw 7
Monday, March 7, 14:35

Sheet A	1	2	3	4	5	6	7	8	Final
Norway (Stordahl) 🔨	2	0	0	0	0	0	1	X	3
Estonia (Koitmäe)	0	1	2	1	1	3	0	X	8

Draw 8
Monday, March 7, 19:35

Sheet D	1	2	3	4	5	6	7	8	Final
United States (Thums)	1	0	0	0	1	0	2	2	6
Norway (Syversen) 🔨	0	2	1	1	0	1	0	0	5

Draw 10
Tuesday, March 8, 14:35

Sheet C	1	2	3	4	5	6	7	8	Final
Latvia (Rožkova) 🔨	2	0	0	1	2	0	1	0	6
Norway (Syversen)	0	0	2	0	0	3	0	3	8

Draw 11
Tuesday, March 8, 19:35

Sheet D	1	2	3	4	5	6	7	8	Final
Norway (Syversen)	0	2	0	2	2	1	0	1	8
Switzerland (Kneubühl) 🔨	2	0	2	0	0	0	1	0	5

Draw 12
Wednesday, March 9, 9:35

Sheet B	1	2	3	4	5	6	7	8	EE	Final
Norway (Syversen)	1	0	2	0	0	0	1	2	0	6
Sweden (Petersson-Dahl) 🔨	0	1	0	2	2	1	0	0	2	8

Draw 13
Wednesday, March 9, 14:35

Sheet C	1	2	3	4	5	6	7	8	Final
Norway (Syversen)	0	0	0	2	0	1	1	0	4
China (Wang) 🔨	1	0	1	0	1	0	0	4	7

Draw 15
Thursday, March 10, 9:35

Sheet A	1	2	3	4	5	6	7	8	Final
Canada (Ideson)	0	1	0	1	0	2	0	3	7
Norway (Syversen) 🔨	1	0	1	0	3	0	1	0	6

== See also ==
- Norway at the Paralympics
- Norway at the 2022 Winter Olympics
