= Ukraine at the 2022 Winter Paralympics =

- Flag of Ukraine
- IPC code: UKR
- NPC: National Sports Committee for the Disabled of Ukraine
- Website: www.paralympic.org.ua

in Beijing, China 4 March 2022 – 13 March 2022
- Competitors: 20 (and 9 sighted guides) (12 men and 8 women) in 2 sports
- Flag bearer (opening): Maksym Yarovyi
- Flag bearer (closing): Vitaliy Lukyanenko
- Medals Ranked 2nd: Gold 11 Silver 10 Bronze 8 Total 29

Winter Paralympics appearances (overview)
- 1998; 2002; 2006; 2010; 2014; 2018; 2022; 2026

Other related appearances
- Soviet Union (1988); Unified Team (1992)

Ukraine competed at the 2022 Winter Paralympics in Beijing, China which took place between 4–13 March 2022. In total, 20 athletes competed in two sports. Ukraine finished in second place in the medal table which was their best result at the Winter Paralympics since competing under the Ukrainian flag at the 1998 Winter Paralympics in Nagano, Japan.

On 24 February 2022, on the first day of the Russian invasion of Ukraine, the International Paralympic Committee (IPC) President Andrew Parsons described transporting the Ukrainian team to Beijing as being an enormous challenge. On 2 March 2022, Parsons confirmed that travel plans were made and that the team would compete at the Games.

Ukrainian athletes won a total of seven medals (including three gold) on the first day of competition, momentarily grabbing the first place in the medal standings.

== Medalists ==
The following Ukrainian competitors won medals at the games. In the discipline sections below, the medalists' names are bolded.

| Medal | Name | Sport | Event | Date |
|---|---|---|---|---|
| Gold | Dmytro Suiarko; Guide: Oleksandr Nikonovych; Grygorii Vovchynskyi; Vasyl Kravchuk; Anatolii Kovalevskyi; Guide: Oleksandr Mukshyn | Cross-country skiing | Open 4 × 2.5 kilometre relay | 13 March |
| Gold | Oleksandra Kononova | Cross-country skiing | Women's 10km, standing | 12 March |
| Gold | Oksana Shyshkova; Guide: Andriy Marchenko | Biathlon | Women's 12.5 kilometers, visually impaired | 11 March |
| Gold | Oleksandr Kazik; Guide: Serhii Kucheriavyi | Biathlon | Men's 12.5 kilometers, visually impaired | 11 March |
| Gold | Liudmyla Liashenko | Biathlon | Women's 12.5 kilometers, standing | 11 March |
| Gold | Vitaliy Lukyanenko; Guide: Borys Babar | Biathlon | Men's 10 kilometres, visually impaired | 8 March |
| Gold | Iryna Bui | Biathlon | Women's 10 kilometres, standing | 8 March |
| Gold | Oksana Shyshkova; Guide: Andriy Marchenko | Cross-country skiing | Women's 15 kilometre classical, visually impaired | 7 March |
| Gold | Oksana Shyshkova; Guide: Andriy Marchenko | Biathlon | Women's 6 kilometres, visually impaired | 5 March |
| Gold | Vitaliy Lukyanenko; Guide: Borys Babar | Biathlon | Men's 6 kilometres, visually impaired | 5 March |
| Gold | Grygorii Vovchynskyi | Biathlon | Men's 6 kilometres, standing | 5 March |
| Silver | Vitaliy Lukyanenko; Guide: Borys Babar | Biathlon | Men's 12.5 kilometers, visually impaired | 11 March |
| Silver | Taras Rad | Biathlon | Men's 12.5 kilometers, sitting | 11 March |
| Silver | Oksana Shyshkova; Guide: Andriy Marchenko | Cross-country skiing | Women's sprint, visually impaired | 9 March |
| Silver | Anatolii Kovalevskyi; Guide: Oleksandr Mukshyn | Biathlon | Men's 10 kilometres, visually impaired | 8 March |
| Silver | Oksana Shyshkova; Guide: Andriy Marchenko | Biathlon | Women's 10 kilometres, visually impaired | 8 March |
| Silver | Grygorii Vovchynskyi | Biathlon | Men's 10 kilometres, standing | 8 March |
| Silver | Oleksandra Kononova | Biathlon | Women's 10 kilometres, standing | 8 March |
| Silver | Liudmyla Liashenko | Biathlon | Women's 6 kilometres, standing | 5 March |
| Silver | Oleksandr Kazik; Guide: Serhii Kucheriavyi | Biathlon | Men's 6 kilometres, visually impaired | 5 March |
| Silver | Taras Rad | Biathlon | Men's 6 kilometres, sitting | 5 March |
| Bronze | Iryna Bui | Cross-country skiing | Women's 10km, standing | 12 March |
| Bronze | Dmytro Suiarko; Guide: Oleksandr Nikonovych | Cross-country skiing | Men's 12.5km, visually impaired | 12 March |
| Bronze | Grygorii Vovchynskyi | Biathlon | Men's 12.5 kilometers, standing | 11 March |
| Bronze | Grygorii Vovchynskyi | Cross-country skiing | Men's sprint, standing | 9 March |
| Bronze | Dmytro Suiarko; Guide: Oleksandr Nikonovych | Biathlon | Men's 10 kilometres, visually impaired | 8 March |
| Bronze | Liudmyla Liashenko | Biathlon | Women's 10 kilometres, standing | 8 March |
| Bronze | Taras Rad | Biathlon | Men's 10 kilometres, sitting | 8 March |
| Bronze | Dmytro Suiarko; Guide: Oleksandr Nikonovych | Biathlon | Men's 6 kilometres, visually impaired | 5 March |

**Medals by sport**
| **Sport** | 1st place, gold medalist(s) | 2nd place, silver medalist(s) | 3rd place, bronze medalist(s) | **Total** |
| Biathlon | 8 | 9 | 5 | **22** |
| Cross-country skiing | 3 | 1 | 3 | **7** |
| **Total** | **11** | **10** | **8** | **29** |

**Medals by gender**
| **Gender** | 1st place, gold medalist(s) | 2nd place, silver medalist(s) | 3rd place, bronze medalist(s) | **Total** |
| Male | 4 | 6 | 1 | **16** |
| Female | 6 | 4 | 2 | **12** |
| Mixed | 1 | 0 | 0 | **1** |
| **Total** | **11** | **10** | **8** | **29** |

== Competitors ==
The following is the list of number of competitors participating at the Games per sport/discipline.

| Sport | Men | Women | Total |
|---|---|---|---|
| Biathlon | 5 | 4 | 9 |
| Cross-country skiing | 7 | 4 | 11 |
| Total | 12 | 8 | 20 |

== Biathlon ==
Ukraine competed in biathlon.

Anastasiia Laletina did not compete in the middle-distance race after her father was captured by Russian forces during the Russian invasion of Ukraine.

Men

| Athlete | Events | Final | | |
| Athlete | Events | Missed Shots | Result | Rank |
|---|---|---|---|---|
| Oleksandr Aleksyk | Sprint, sitting | 4 | 23:15.4 | 19 |
| Oleksandr Aleksyk | Middle distance, sitting | 5 | 34:29.1 | 13 |
| Oleksandr Aleksyk | Individual, sitting | 3 | 46:04.6 | 13 |
| Pavlo Bal | Sprint, sitting | 2 | 20:52.5 | 13 |
| Pavlo Bal | Middle distance, sitting | 3 | 32:31.7 | 6 |
| Pavlo Bal | Individual, sitting | 5 | 45:45.3 | 12 |
| Serafym Drahun | Sprint, standing | 6 | 21:34.1 | 15 |
| Oleksandr Kazik; Guide: Serhii Kucheriavyi | Sprint, visually impaired | 2 | 17:31.9 | 2nd place, silver medalist(s) |
| Oleksandr Kazik; Guide: Serhii Kucheriavyi | Middle distance, visually impaired | 5 | 37:00.2 | 5 |
| Oleksandr Kazik; Guide: Serhii Kucheriavyi | Individual, visually impaired | 2 | 43:16.1 | 1st place, gold medalist(s) |
| Anatolii Kovalevskyi; Guide: Oleksandr Mukshyn | Sprint, visually impaired | 3 | 18:33.8 | 5 |
| Anatolii Kovalevskyi; Guide: Oleksandr Mukshyn | Middle distance, visually impaired | 1 | 34:57.3 | 2nd place, silver medalist(s) |
| Anatolii Kovalevskyi; Guide: Oleksandr Mukshyn | Individual, visually impaired | 6 | 47:26.7 | 5 |
| Vasyl Kravchuk | Sprint, sitting | 3 | 20:37.0 | 10 |
| Vasyl Kravchuk | Middle distance, sitting | 5 | 32:12.1 | 4 |
| Vasyl Kravchuk | Individual, sitting | 2 | 44:26.1 | 11 |
| Vitaliy Lukyanenko; Guide: Borys Babar | Sprint, visually impaired | 0 | 17:05.8 | 1st place, gold medalist(s) |
| Vitaliy Lukyanenko; Guide: Borys Babar | Middle distance, visually impaired | 0 | 34:12.7 | 1st place, gold medalist(s) |
| Vitaliy Lukyanenko; Guide: Borys Babar | Individual, visually impaired | 2 | 44:44.3 | 2nd place, silver medalist(s) |
| Taras Rad | Sprint, sitting | 1 | 19:09.0 | 2nd place, silver medalist(s) |
| Taras Rad | Middle distance, sitting | 4 | 31:26.9 | 3rd place, bronze medalist(s) |
| Taras Rad | Individual, sitting | 0 | 39:13.9 | 2nd place, silver medalist(s) |
| Iaroslav Reshetynskyi; Guide: Kostiantyn Yaremenko | Sprint, visually impaired | 2 | 18:41.7 | 6 |
| Iaroslav Reshetynskyi; Guide: Kostiantyn Yaremenko | Middle distance, visually impaired | 0 | 35:47.8 | 4 |
| Iaroslav Reshetynskyi; Guide: Kostiantyn Yaremenko | Individual, visually impaired | 4 | 46:55.4 | 4 |
| Dmytro Suiarko; Guide: Oleksandr Nikonovych | Sprint, visually impaired | 1 | 17:33.3 | 3rd place, bronze medalist(s) |
| Dmytro Suiarko; Guide: Oleksandr Nikonovych | Middle distance, visually impaired | 2 | 35:30.9 | 3rd place, bronze medalist(s) |
| Grygorii Vovchynskyi | Sprint, standing | 0 | 16:17.6 | 1st place, gold medalist(s) |
| Grygorii Vovchynskyi | Middle distance, standing | 1 | 32:18.0 | 2nd place, silver medalist(s) |
| Grygorii Vovchynskyi | Individual, standing | 1 | 42:26.0 | 3rd place, bronze medalist(s) |
| Maksym Yarovyi | Sprint, sitting | 2 | 20:45.5 | 11 |
| Maksym Yarovyi | Middle distance, sitting | DNF | | |
| Maksym Yarovyi | Individual, sitting | 5 | 49:44.4 | 17 |

Women

| Athlete | Events | Final | | |
| Athlete | Events | Missed Shots | Result | Rank |
|---|---|---|---|---|
| Yuliia Batenkova-Bauman | Sprint, standing | 1 | 20:24.2 | 4 |
| Yuliia Batenkova-Bauman | Middle distance, standing | 2 | 37:29.9 | 5 |
| Yuliia Batenkova-Bauman | Individual, standing | 0 | 49:45.2 | 5 |
| Iryna Bui | Sprint, standing | 3 | 20:26.8 | 6 |
| Iryna Bui | Middle distance, standing | 0 | 36:43.1 | 1st place, gold medalist(s) |
| Iryna Bui | Individual, standing | 1 | 49:12.9 | 4 |
| Bohdana Konashuk | Sprint, standing | 1 | 21:14.3 | 10 |
| Bohdana Konashuk | Middle distance, standing | 3 | 39:08.9 | 7 |
| Bohdana Konashuk | Individual, standing | 5 | 54:53.6 | 10 |
| Oleksandra Kononova | Sprint, standing | 4 | 21:48.7 | 11 |
| Oleksandra Kononova | Middle distance, standing | 2 | 36:55.9 | 2nd place, silver medalist(s) |
| Oleksandra Kononova | Individual, standing | 6 | 54:23.5 | 9 |
| Anastasiia Laletina | Sprint, sitting | 5 | 28:48.0 | 10 |
| Anastasiia Laletina | Middle distance, sitting | DNS | | |
| Anastasiia Laletina | Individual, sitting | 2 | 53:39.4 | 9 |
| Liudmyla Liashenko | Sprint, standing | 2 | 19:51.7 | 2nd place, silver medalist(s) |
| Liudmyla Liashenko | Middle distance, standing | 2 | 36:56.9 | 3rd place, bronze medalist(s) |
| Liudmyla Liashenko | Individual, standing | 2 | 47:22.0 | 1st place, gold medalist(s) |
| Oksana Shyshkova; Guide: Andriy Marchenko | Sprint, visually impaired | 0 | 20:09.0 | 1st place, gold medalist(s) |
| Oksana Shyshkova; Guide: Andriy Marchenko | Middle distance, visually impaired | 2 | 40:59.9 | 2nd place, silver medalist(s) |
| Oksana Shyshkova; Guide: Andriy Marchenko | Individual, visually impaired | 0 | 50:19.6 | 1st place, gold medalist(s) |
| Nataliia Tkachenko; Guide: Denys Nikulin | Sprint, visually impaired | 2 | 23:30.8 | 6 |
| Nataliia Tkachenko; Guide: Denys Nikulin | Middle distance, visually impaired | 5 | 49:03.4 | 6 |
| Nataliia Tkachenko; Guide: Denys Nikulin | Individual, visually impaired | 3 | 1:02:08.2 | 6 |

== Cross-country skiing ==
Ukraine competed in cross-country skiing.

Men

| Athlete | Class | Event | Qualification | | Semifinal | | Final | |
| Athlete | Class | Event | Time | Rank | Time | Rank | Time | Rank |
|---|---|---|---|---|---|---|---|---|
| Oleksandr Aleksyk | LW12 | Middle distance, sitting | —N/a | | | | 34:53.3 | 11 |
| Pavlo Bal | LW11.5 | Sprint, sitting | 2:23.60 | 7 Q | 3:10.9 | 5 | Did not advance | |
| Pavlo Bal | LW11.5 | Middle distance, sitting | —N/a | | | | 34:21.5 | 8 |
| Serafym Drahun | LW8 | Sprint, standing | 3:00.13 | 15 | Did not advance | | | |
| Serafym Drahun | LW8 | Middle distance, standing | —N/a | | | | 42:58.8 | 17 |
| Serafym Drahun | LW8 | Long distance, standing | —N/a | | | | 1:08:42.2 | 15 |
| Oleksandr Kazik; Guide: Serhii Kucheriavyi | B1 | Middle distance, visually impaired | —N/a | | | | 34:27.4 | 5 |
| Anatolii Kovalevskiy; Guide: Oleksandr Mukshyn | B2 | Sprint, visually impaired | 2:44.95 | 5 Q | 3:57.1 | 3 | Did not advance | |
| Anatolii Kovalevskiy; Guide: Oleksandr Mukshyn | B2 | Middle distance, visually impaired | —N/a | | | | 35:16.3 | 7 |
| Vasyl Kravchuk | LW11 | Sprint, sitting | 2:30.68 | 17 | Did not advance | | | |
| Vasyl Kravchuk | LW11 | Middle distance, sitting | —N/a | | | | 33:48.4 | 7 |
| Vasyl Kravchuk | LW11 | Long distance, sitting | —N/a | | | | 50:38.7 | 11 |
| Taras Rad | LW12 | Sprint, sitting | 2:24.84 | 9 Q | 2:55.8 | 3 Q | 3:03.6 | 6 |
| Taras Rad | LW12 | Long distance, sitting | —N/a | | | | 50:25.3 | 10 |
| Iaroslav Reshetynskyi; Guide: Kostiantyn Yaremenko | B2 | Sprint, visually impaired | 2:50.41 | 10 | Did not advance | | | |
| Dmytro Suiarko; Guide: Oleksandr Nikonovych | B2 | Sprint, visually impaired | 2:47.38 | 6 Q | 3:49.4 | 3 | Did not advance | |
| Dmytro Suiarko; Guide: Oleksandr Nikonovych | B2 | Middle distance, visually impaired | —N/a | | | | 34:08.1 | 3rd place, bronze medalist(s) |
| Grygorii Vovchynskyi | LW8 | Sprint, standing | 2:46.90 | 3 Q | 3:25.5 | 2 Q | 3:09.3 | 3rd place, bronze medalist(s) |
| Maksym Yarovyi | LW10 | Sprint, sitting | 2:34.71 | 20 | Did not advance | | | |
| Maksym Yarovyi | LW10 | Middle distance, sitting | —N/a | | | | 37:03.2 | 17 |
| Maksym Yarovyi | LW10 | Long distance, sitting | —N/a | | | | 53:30.1 | 15 |

Women

| Athlete | Class | Event | Qualification | | Semifinal | | Final | |
| Athlete | Class | Event | Time | Rank | Time | Rank | Time | Rank |
|---|---|---|---|---|---|---|---|---|
| Yuliia Batenkova-Bauman | LW6 | Middle distance, standing | —N/a | | | | 46:15.0 | 12 |
| Yuliia Batenkova-Bauman | LW6 | Long distance, standing | —N/a | | | | 54:39.8 | 6 |
| Iryna Bui | LW8 | Middle distance, standing | —N/a | | | | 41:47.1 | 3rd place, bronze medalist(s) |
| Bohdana Konashuk | LW8 | Sprint, standing | DNS | | | | | |
| Bohdana Konashuk | LW8 | Middle distance, standing | —N/a | | | | 45:19.2 | 10 |
| Oleksandra Kononova | LW8 | Sprint, standing | 3:16.76 | 4 Q | 4:20.2 | 2 Q | 4:26.1 | 5 |
| Oleksandra Kononova | LW8 | Middle distance, standing | —N/a | | | | 41:18.0 | 1st place, gold medalist(s) |
| Anastasiia Laletina | LW12 | Sprint, sitting | 3:17.25 | 15 | Did not advance | | | |
| Liudmyla Liashenko | LW8 | Sprint, standing | 3:17.54 | 6 Q | 4:32.1 | 3 Q | 4:30.1 | 6 |
| Liudmyla Liashenko | LW8 | Middle distance, standing | —N/a | | | | 41:56.1 | 4 |
| Liudmyla Liashenko | LW8 | Long distance, standing | —N/a | | | | DNS | |
| Oksana Shyshkova; Guide: Andriy Marchenko | B2 | Sprint, visually impaired | 3:33.18 | 3 Q | 3:58.1 | 2 Q | 3:56.4 | 2nd place, silver medalist(s) |
| Oksana Shyshkova; Guide: Andriy Marchenko | B2 | Middle distance, visually impaired | —N/a | | | | 43:36.6 | 4 |
| Oksana Shyshkova; Guide: Andriy Marchenko | B2 | Long distance, visually impaired | —N/a | | | | 51:09.1 | 1st place, gold medalist(s) |
| Nataliia Tkachenko; Guide: Denys Nikulin | B2 | Sprint, visually impaired | 3:46.58 | 8 Q | 4:13.5 | 4 | Did not advance | |
| Nataliia Tkachenko; Guide: Denys Nikulin | B2 | Middle distance, visually impaired | —N/a | | | | DNF | |
| Nataliia Tkachenko; Guide: Denys Nikulin | B2 | Long distance, visually impaired | —N/a | | | | 59:45.0 | 5 |

Relay

| Athletes | Event | Time | Rank |
|---|---|---|---|
| Taras Rad; Iryna Bui; Pavlo Bal; Oleksandra Kononova | Mixed relay | 27:21.9 | 4 |
| Dmytro Suiarko; Guide: Oleksandr Nikonovych; Grygorii Vovchynskyi; Vasyl Kravchuk; Anatolii Kovalevskyi; Guide: Oleksandr Mukshyn | Open relay | 28:05.3 | 1st place, gold medalist(s) |

== See also ==
- Ukraine at the Paralympics
- Ukraine at the 2022 Winter Olympics
