= Aline Rocha =

Brazilian wheelchair racer and skier

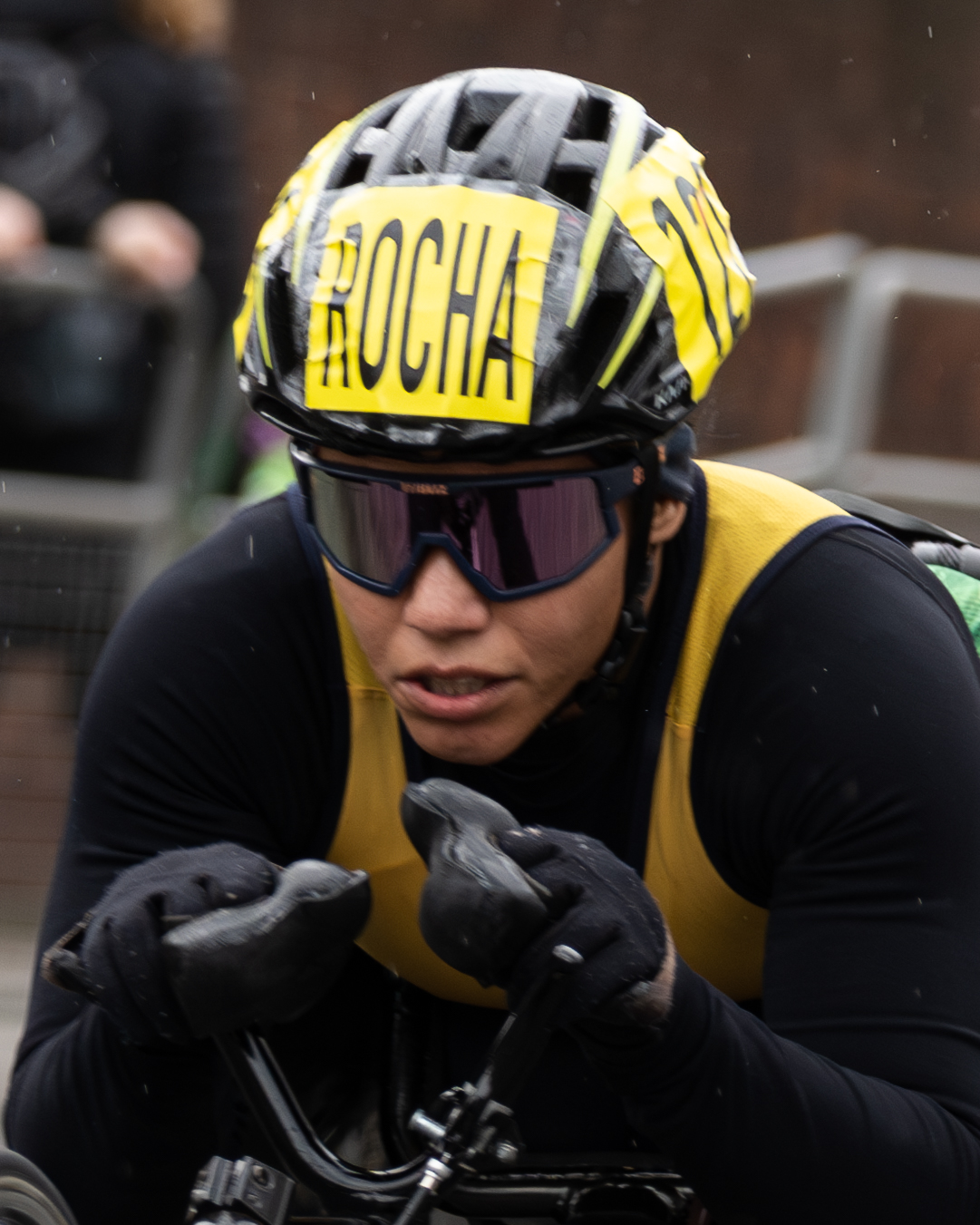
- Aline Rocha at the 2023 London Marathon.

Personal information
- Full name: Aline dos Santos Rocha
- Born: 20 February 1991 (age 35) Pinhão, Paraná, Brazil
- Education: University of Western Santa Catarina

Sport
- Sport: Para athletics (Wheelchair racing); Para cross-country skiing
- Disability class: T54 (wheelchair racing); Sitting (skiing)

Achievements and titles
- Paralympic finals: 2016 Summer, 2018 Winter, 2022 Winter, 2026 Winter
Medal record
Representing Brazil
Para cross-country skiing
Paralympic Ski World Cup
Bronze medal – third place	2021 Kranjska Gora	5 km
World Para Nordic Skiing Championships
Gold medal – first place	2023 Ostersund	Sprint freestyle
Silver medal – second place	2025 Toblach	10km Start Sitting Classic
Bronze medal – third place	2023 Ostersund	10 km freestyle
Bronze medal – third place	2023 Ostersund	18 km classical
Wheelchair racing
World Marathon Majors
Bronze medal – third place	2021 Berlin	Marathon
Para athletics
World Championships
Bronze medal – third place	2024 Kobe	5000 m T54
Parapan American Games
Silver medal – second place	2023 Santiago	400m T54

Aline dos Santos Rocha (born 20 February 1991) is a Brazilian wheelchair racer, biathlete and cross-country skier, who came third at the 2021 Berlin Marathon, and won multiple medals at the 2023 World Para Nordic Skiing Championships. She competed at the 2016 Summer Paralympics and the 2018, 2022, and 2026 Winter Paralympics.

== Personal life ==
Rocha is from Paraná, Brazil. At the age of 15, Rocha was injured in a car accident, and became paraplegic. She studied physical education at the University of Western Santa Catarina. Rocha is married to Fernando Orso, who is also her coach.

== Wheelchair racing career ==
As of 2017, Rocha had won the Saint Silvester Road Race on four occasions. In 2015, she won the 100 metres, 400 metres and 800 metres events at the Jogos Regionais do Estado de São Paulo (Regional Games of the State of São Paulo). Later in the year, she finished third at the Oita International Wheelchair Marathon in a Brazilian national record time of 01:49:37. She competed at the 2016 Summer Paralympics, finishing ninth overall in the 1500 metres T54 competition and 10th in the marathon T54 event, after falling away from the main group after 18 kilometres (11 mi) of the race. She went out in the heats of the 5000 metres T54 event. Rocha came 10th at the 2019 London Marathon.

Rocha came third at the 2021 Berlin Marathon. Later in the year, she came fifth at the 2021 London Marathon. She suffered a flat tyre a few minutes prior to the race start.

== Skiing career ==
In 2017, Rocha competed at the Cross-Country Ski World Cup in Ukraine. Rocha was selected for the 2018 Winter Paralympics in Pyeongchang, South Korea. She was the first Brazilian woman to compete at a Winter Paralympic Games, and was the country's flagbearer at the Parade of Nations. At the Games, she finished 12th in the 5 km sitting event, 15th in the 12 km sitting event and 22nd in the qualification round of the 1.5 km sprint classical sitting event. She was also part of the Brazilian team that finished 13th and last in the 4 x 2.5 kilometre mixed relay; she competed in two legs of the event.

Rocha finished third in the 5 km event at the 2021 Paralympic Ski World Cup event in Kranjska Gora, Slovenia. In October 2021, she competed at the Paralympic Rollerski Championship. In January 2022, Rocha came fourth in the 15 km sitting event at the 2021 World Para Snow Sports Championships.

Rocha qualified for the 2022 Winter Paralympics in Beijing, China. Rocha and Cristian Ribera were Brazil's flag bearers at the 2022 Winter Paralympics Parade of Nations. She came seventh in the 15 km sitting event, and 10th in the 7.5 km sitting event. She was fifth in her semi-final at the 1.5 km sprint sitting event, and did not qualify for the final.

At the 2023 World Para Nordic Skiing Championships, Rocha won the sprint freestyle race, and finished third in both the 10 km freestyle and 18 km classical events.
