= Taryn Dickens =

Australian Paralympic skier

Personal information
- Nationality: Australia
- Born: 2 June 1982 (age 44) Brisbane, Queensland

Sport
- Country: Australia

Taryn Dickens (born 2 June 1982) is an Australian para skier with a vision impairment. She competed in biathlon and cross-country skiing at the 2026 Winter Paralympics. She became the first Australian female to compete in biathlon.

== Personal ==
Dickens was born on 2 June 1982 in Brisbane, Queensland. In 2017, she enlisted Weapons Rate Electronics Technician in the Royal Australian Navy. In her mid thirties, as an Able Seaman in the Royal Australian Navy she started to experience degenerative vision loss. In 2019, she was diagnosed with cone-rod dystrophy. After her diagnosis, Gigi, became her assistance dog. She is married to Dee.

== Skiing ==
In 2023, she was classified as B3 vision impaired skier. Her military background led to her taking at biathlon so that she could participate at the Paralympics. She took up skiing in May 2022 and after two weeks of learning to ski competed in the 42 km Kangaroo Hoppet at Falls Creek. Dickens first tri military service biathlon competition as at Exercise Coolshot in August 2022.

Prior to her diagnosis, she was a competitive cyclist, played soccer and muay thai. She co-captained the 2023 Australian Invictus Games team where she competed in cycling, powerlifting and indoor rowing.

At the 2026 Winter Paralympics, she competed in biathlon and cross-country skiing. Biathlon results were - 13th in the Women's Individual - Visually Impaired and Women's Sprint pursuit - Visually Impaired and 14th in Women's Sprint - Visually Impaired. Cross-country skiing results were - 13th in the Women's Sprint - Visually Impaired. Her guide was Lynn Maree Cullen.
