= Carina Edlingerová =

Czech Para cross-country skier and biathlete (born 1998)

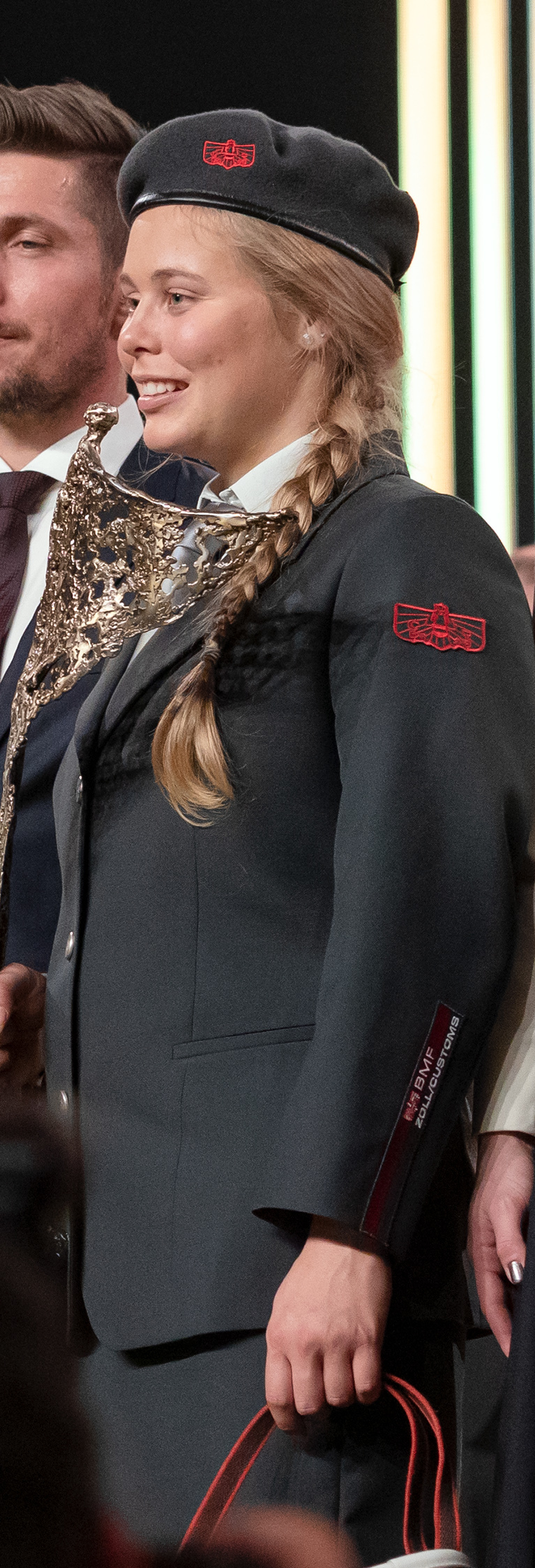
- Edlingerová in September 2021

Personal information
- Nationality: Austrian (until February 2026), Czech (since February 2026)
- Born: Carina Edlinger; 13 August 1998 (age 28) Bad Ischl, Austria

Sport
- Country: Austria; Czech Republic
- Sport: Para Nordic skiing (Para cross-country skiing and Para biathlon)
- Disability class: NS3
- Partners: Alexandr Paťava (guide and coach)
Medal record
Women's Para biathlon
Representing Czech Republic
Paralympic Games
Gold medal – first place	2026 Milano Cortina	Sprint pursuit
Silver medal – second place	2026 Milano Cortina	Sprint
Women's Para cross-country skiing
Representing Austria
Paralympic Games
Gold medal – first place	2022 Beijing	1.5km sprint
Bronze medal – third place	2018 Pyeongchang	7.5km classical
Bronze medal – third place	2022 Beijing	10 km free

Carina Edlingerová or Carina Edlinger (born 13 August 1998) is an Austrian-Czech visually-impaired Para cross-country skier and biathlete.

== Career ==
She made her Paralympic debut during the 2018 Winter Paralympics when she was only 19 years old and claimed her first Paralympic medal (bronze) with the assistance of her elder brother, Julian Edlinger who served as the sighted guide for Carina. Carina Edlinger clinched a bronze medal in the women's 7.5km classical cross-country skiing event at the 2018 Winter Paralympics. She competed at the 2022 Winter Paralympics and won a gold medal in the 1.5 kilometre sprint and a bronze medal in the 10 kilometre free event.

In July 2025, Edlingerová announced that she intended to change nations and start for the Czech Republic from the 2025–26 season onwards alongside Petra Hynčicová as her guide. Edlingerová said the reason for this was a lack of support by the Austrian Ski Association. On 12 June 2025, the request was denied by the International Ski and Snowboard Federation. The reason given was that Edlingerová lacked to provide proof that she had her main recidency in the Czech Republic for the past two years. However, she obtained this right in February of the following year.

Edlingerová competed at the 2026 Winter Paralympics, won a gold medal in the biathlon sprint pursuit and a silver medal in the biathlon sprint.
