= Sydney Peterson =

American Para cross-country skier and biathlete (born 2002)

Personal information
- Born: February 17, 2002 (age 24)
- Home town: Lake Elmo, Minnesota, U.S.
- Height: 5 ft 8 in (173 cm)

Sport
- Country: United States
- Sport: Para Nordic skiing (Para cross-country skiing and Para biathlon)
- Disability: Dystonia
- Disability class: LW9
- University team: St. Lawrence University
Medal record
Women's Para cross-country skiing
Representing United States
Paralympic Games
Gold medal – first place	2022 Beijing	4 × 2.5 km mixed relay
Gold medal – first place	2026 Milano Cortina	10 km standing
Gold medal – first place	2026 Milano Cortina	20 km standing
Gold medal – first place	2026 Milano Cortina	4 × 2.5 km mixed relay
Silver medal – second place	2022 Beijing	15 km classical standing
Silver medal – second place	2026 Milano Cortina	Sprint standing
Bronze medal – third place	2022 Beijing	1.5 km sprint standing
World Para Snow Sports Championships
Silver medal – second place	2021 Lillehammer	1 km
Silver medal – second place	2021 Lillehammer	10 km
Bronze medal – third place	2021 Lillehammer	15 km
Bronze medal – third place	2023 Östersund	10 km
Bronze medal – third place	2023 Östersund	1 km

Sydney Jo Peterson (born February 17, 2002) is an American Para cross-country skier and biathlete.

== Career ==
Peterson began skiing at the age of 5. She skied for Stillwater Area High School in Minnesota.

Peterson won the silver medal in the women's 10 km standing cross-country skiing event and the woman's standing cross country sprint event at the 2021 World Para Snow Sports Championships held in Lillehammer, Norway. She also won the bronze medal in the women's long-distance standing cross-country skiing event.

Peterson competed at the 2022 Winter Paralympics and created history in her first Paralympic appearance after claiming a silver medal in the women's 15 km classic standing event. In doing so she became the first standing American female to earn a medal. In addition to her silver medal achievement, Peterson also clinched bronze in the skate sprint and gold in the team mixed relay.

In the 2023 season, Peterson earned two bronze medals, in the Skate sprint and Skate 10 km, in the FIS 2023 Para Nordic World Championships in Östersund Sweden. At the championships, Peterson raced her debut race in biathlon earning 4th.

Additionally, Peterson skied on the Division 1 NCAA ski team at St. Lawrence University, where graduated from in 2023 with a bachelors of science in neuroscience. Peterson plans to pursue a PhD in neuroscience.

The fall of 2023, Peterson underwent a series of major surgeries to have a deep brain stimulator placed, in the hopes of slowing the progression of her dystonia. Shortly following DBS, Peterson returned to compete in the 2024 Biathlon World Championships and 2024 World Cup Finals where she earned two top 5 finishes.

In Para biathlon at the 2026 Winter Paralympics, she finished fourth in the women's sprint standing and sprint pursuit standing events.
