= Yang Hongqiong =

Chinese paralympic cross country skier

Sport
- Country: China
- Sport: Cross-country skiing
- Disability class: LW10
Medal record
Representing China
Paralympic Games
Women's para cross-country skiing
Gold medal – first place	2022 Beijing	15 km sitting
Gold medal – first place	2022 Beijing	1.5 km sitting
Gold medal – first place	2022 Beijing	10 km sitting

Yang Hongqiong is a Chinese paralympic cross country skier.

== Career ==
She participated at the 2022 Winter Paralympics and won the gold medal in the 15 kilometre sitting event with a time of 43:06.7, and 1.5 kilometre sitting event.

She was the flagbearer for China during the closing ceremony of the 2022 Winter Paralympics.

Paralympics
Preceded by Wang Haitao	Flagbearer for China at the Paralympics closing ceremony (China) Beijing 2022	Succeeded by Incumbent
