= Pinhão, Paraná =

Coordinates: 25°41′45″S 51°39′36″W

- Municipality
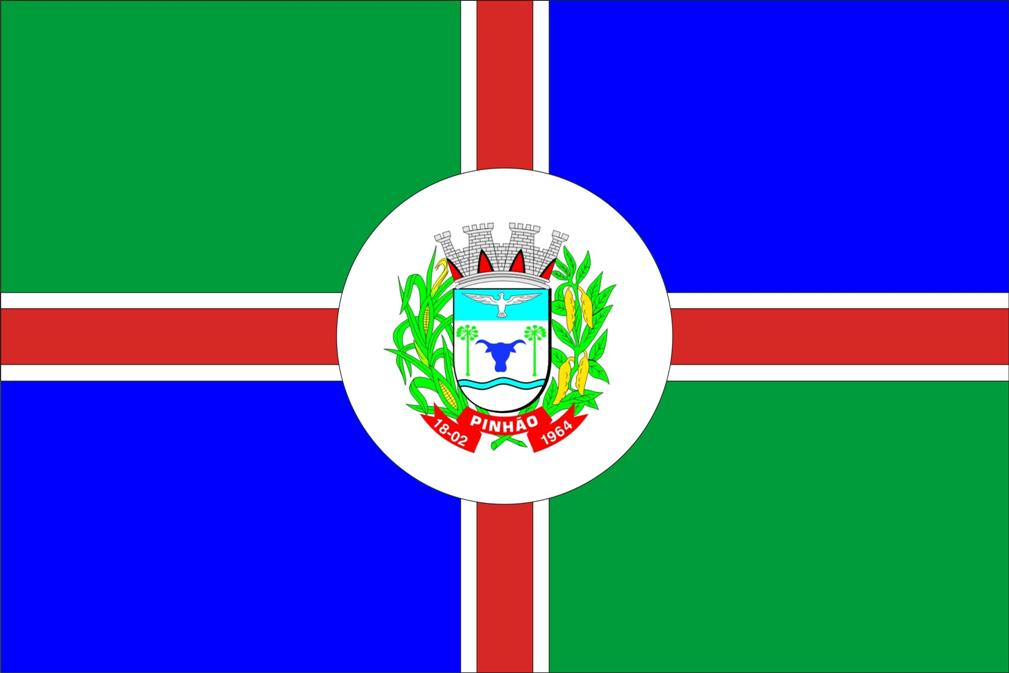
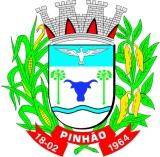
- Flag Coat of arms
- Interactive map of Pinhão, Paraná
- Country: Brazil
- Region: Southern
- State: Paraná
- Mesoregion: Centro-Sul Paranaense

Population (2020)
  - Total: 32,559
- Time zone: UTC−3 (BRT)

Pinhão, Paraná is a municipality in the state of Paraná in the Southern Region of Brazil.

== See also ==
- List of municipalities in Paraná
