= Linn Kazmaier =

German Para biathlete and cross-country skier (born 2006)

Personal information
- Born: 5 November 2006 (age 19) Nürtingen, Germany

Sport
- Country: Germany
- Sport: Para Nordic skiing (Para cross-country skiing and Para biathlon)
- Disability class: NS3
- Club: SZ Römerstein
Medal record
Representing Germany
Women's Para biathlon
Paralympic Games
Silver medal – second place	2022 Beijing	6 km visually impaired
Silver medal – second place	2022 Beijing	12.5km visually impaired
World Championships
Gold medal – first place	2023 Östersund	12.5 km Individual
Silver medal – second place	2023 Östersund	7.5 km sprint
Women's Para cross-country skiing
Paralympic Games
Gold medal – first place	2022 Beijing	10 km free
Silver medal – second place	2022 Beijing	15 km classical
Silver medal – second place	2026 Milano Cortina	Sprint visually impaired
Silver medal – second place	2026 Milano Cortina	4 × 2.5 km relay open
Bronze medal – third place	2022 Beijing	1.5 km sprint
World Championships
Gold medal – first place	2023 Östersund	18 km Individual
Gold medal – first place	2023 Östersund	10 km freestyle
Gold medal – first place	2023 Östersund	4×2.5 km open relay
Silver medal – second place	2023 Östersund	Sprint freestyle

Linn Kazmaier (born 5 November 2006) is a German visually impaired Para cross-country skier and biathlete. She represented Germany at the 2022 and 2026 Winter Paralympics.

== Career ==
Kazmaier represented Germany at the 2022 Winter Paralympics and won five medals. She won two silver medals in the 6 kilometres and 12.5 kilometres biathlon events, and a gold medal in the 10 kilometre free, a silver medal in the 15 kilometre classical and a bronze medal in the 1.5 kilometres sprint cross-country skiing events. At 15 years old, she was the youngest para biathlete at the Paralympics.

She competed at the 2023 World Para Nordic Skiing Championships in para-biathlon and won a gold medal in the 12.5 kilometre individual and a silver medal in the 7.5 kilometre sprint. She also competed in para cross-country and won gold medals in the 18 kilometere individual, 10 kilometre freestyle, and 4×2.5 kilometre open relay.
