= Li Panpan =

Chinese paralympic cross country skier

Sport
- Country: China
- Sport: Cross-country skiing
- Disability class: LW10.5
Medal record
Representing China
Paralympic Games
Women's para cross-country skiing
Bronze medal – third place	2022 Beijing	15 km sitting
Bronze medal – third place	2022 Beijing	1.5km sprint sitting

Li Panpan is a Chinese paralympic cross country skier.

== Career ==
She participated at the 2022 Winter Paralympics and won bronze medals in the 15 kilometre sitting event and the 1.5 kilometre sprint event.
