= Natalie Wilkie =

Canadian Para cross-country skier and biathlete (born 2001)

Personal information
- Nationality: Canadian
- Born: January 21, 2001 (age 25) Salmon Arm, British Columbia, Canada

Sport
- Country: Canada
- Sport: Para Nordic skiing (Para cross-country skiing and Para biathlon)
- Disability class: LW8
Medal record
Representing Canada
Winter Paralympics
Women's Para cross-country skiing
Gold medal – first place	2022 Beijing	15 km classical standing
Gold medal – first place	2022 Beijing	1.5km sprint standing
Gold medal – first place	2018 Pyeongchang	7.5km classic standing
Silver medal – second place	2018 Pyeongchang	4 × 2.5km mixed relay
Silver medal – second place	2022 Beijing	10 km free standing
Bronze medal – third place	2018 Pyeongchang	1.5km sprint classic standing
Bronze medal – third place	2022 Beijing	4 × 2.5km mixed relay
Bronze medal – third place	2026 Milano Cortina	Sprint standing
Women's Para biathlon
Gold medal – first place	2026 Milano Cortina	Individual standing
Gold medal – first place	2026 Milano Cortina	Sprint pursuit standing
Silver medal – second place	2026 Milano Cortina	Sprint standing

Natalie Wilkie (born January 21, 2001) is a Canadian Para cross-country skier and biathlete. As the youngest member of Team Canada at the 2018 Winter Paralympic Games, Wilkie won gold, silver, and bronze medals at the PyeongChang, South Korea games.

== Career ==
Wilkie began training and competing in able-bodied cross-country skiing when she was 4 years old, growing up near the Larch Hills Cross Country Ski Area near Salmon Arm, BC, Canada.

In June 2016, as a Grade 9 student at Salmon Arm Secondary School, Wilkie lost four fingers on her left hand in an accident involving a jointer during a school woodworking class. She resumed training with her able-bodied ski club only two weeks after the accident.

Wilkie was introduced to para cross-country skiing at a camp in Canmore, Alberta in November 2016. Today, she competes nationally in Canada in both Paralympic cross-country skiing using a single ski pole and in able-bodied cross-country skiing using two ski poles.

Wilkie was designated the “CTV Athlete of the Week” on December 18, 2017.

In February 2018, Wilkie was selected as the youngest member of the PyeongChang 2018 Canadian Paralympic Team. At the 2018 Winter Paralympic Games, at the age of 17, she won a gold medal in the Women's 7.5 km Classic, Standing, a silver medal in the 4x2.5 Mixed Relay, a bronze medal in the Women's 1.5 km Sprint Classic, Standing, and placed sixth in the Women's 15 km Free, Standing.

At the 2019 World Para Nordic Skiing Championships held in Prince George, Canada, Wilkie won silver medals in the Women's Long C, Standing and Mixed Relay events. She also earned 4th place finishes in the Women's Sprint F, Standing and Women's Middle F, Standing events. At the Sapporo 2019 World Para Nordic Skiing World Cup held in March 2019, Wilkie won a gold medal in the Women's Short C, Standing and a silver medal in the Women's Middle F, Standing events.

At the Milano Cortina 2026 Winter Olympics Paralympic Games, Wilkie served as Team Canada's co-flag bearer. She won bronze in the sprint classic standing biathlon, silver in the sprint standing biathlon and won Canada's first gold medal of the games in the individual standing biathlon.
