= Oksana Masters =

Ukrainian-born American Para rower and cross-country skier

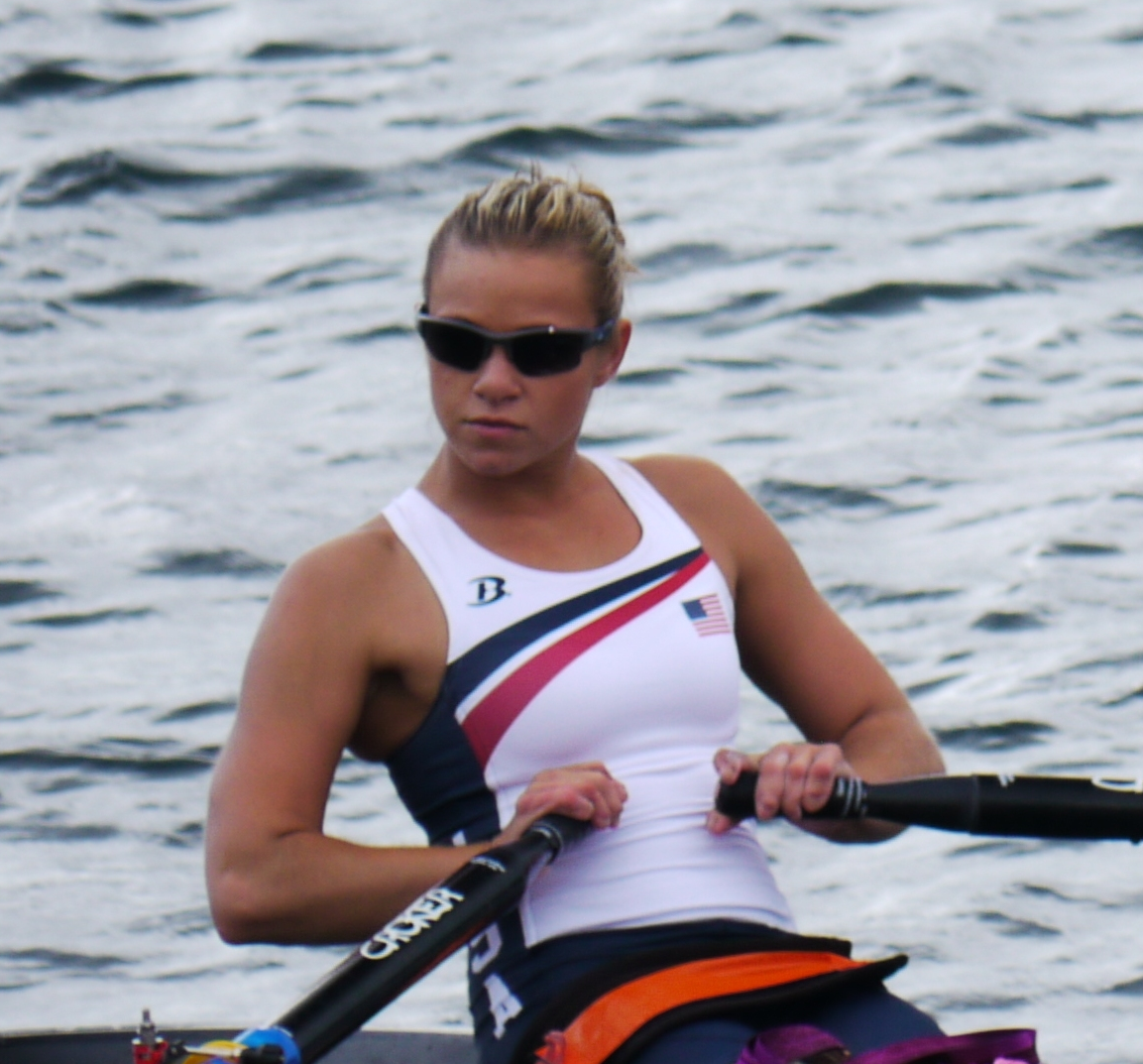
- Masters at 2012 Summer Paralympics

Personal information
- Native name: Оксана Мастерс
- Nationality: American
- Born: June 19, 1989 (age 37) Khmelnytskyi, Ukrainian SSR, Soviet Union (now Ukraine)
- Height: 5 ft 8 in (173 cm) (2012)
- Weight: 122 lb (55 kg) (2012)

Sport
- Country: USA
- Sport: Para rowing, Para cycling, Para cross-country skiing, Para biathlon
- Event: Mixed Sculls
- Team: U.S. Paralympic
- Partner: Aaron Pike
- Coached by: Justin Lednar, Bob Hurley, Roger Payne, Brad Alan Lewis

Achievements and titles
- Paralympic finals: 2012 Summer Paralympics: Trunk and arms mixed double sculls – Bronze, 2014 Winter Paralympics: Nordic Ski Cross Country – Silver & Bronze and Biathlon, 2016 Summer Paralympics: Cycling
Medal record
Representing United States
Women's Para cross-country skiing
Paralympic Games
Gold medal – first place	2018 Pyeongchang	1.5km sprint classic sitting
Gold medal – first place	2018 Pyeongchang	5 km sitting
Gold medal – first place	2022 Beijing	4 × 2.5 km mixed relay
Gold medal – first place	2026 Milano Cortina	Sprint sitting
Gold medal – first place	2026 Milano Cortina	10 km sitting
Gold medal – first place	2026 Milano Cortina	4 × 2.5 km mixed relay
Silver medal – second place	2014 Sochi	12 km sitting
Silver medal – second place	2022 Beijing	15 km sitting
Silver medal – second place	2022 Beijing	1.5 km sprint sitting
Silver medal – second place	2022 Beijing	10 km sitting
Bronze medal – third place	2014 Sochi	5 km sitting
Bronze medal – third place	2018 Pyeongchang	12 km sitting
Bronze medal – third place	2026 Milano Cortina	20 km sitting
Women's Para biathlon
Paralympic Games
Gold medal – first place	2022 Beijing	6 km sitting
Gold medal – first place	2022 Beijing	12.5 km sitting
Gold medal – first place	2026 Milano Cortina	Sprint sitting
Silver medal – second place	2018 Pyeongchang	6 km sitting
Silver medal – second place	2018 Pyeongchang	12.5 km sitting
Silver medal – second place	2022 Beijing	10 km sitting
Women's Para rowing
Paralympic Games
Bronze medal – third place	2012 London	Trunk and arms mixed double sculls
Women's Para cycling
Paralympic Games
Gold medal – first place	2020 Tokyo	Road time trial H4–5
Gold medal – first place	2020 Tokyo	Road race H5
Gold medal – first place	2024 Paris	Road time trial H4–5
Gold medal – first place	2024 Paris	Road race H5
Road World Championships
Gold medal – first place	2023 Glasgow	Road race H5

Oksana Oleksandrivna Masters (Note: Ukrainian: Оксана Олександрівна Мастерс, romanized: Oksana Oleksandrivna Masters) (born June 19, 1989) is an American multi-sport Paralympic athlete from Louisville, Kentucky. Having primarily specialized in rowing and cross-country skiing, she won the first ever United States medal in trunk and arms mixed double sculls at the 2012 Summer Paralympics in London. She was also a part of the U.S. Nordic skiing team at the 2014 Winter Paralympics and the 2018 Winter Paralympics. She won two Paralympic medals in 2014 and five Paralympic medals in 2018, including two gold. She switched to para-cycling after the 2012 Paralympics and competed at the 2016 and 2020 Summer Paralympics, winning two gold medals at the latter. She competed at the 2022 Winter Paralympics, winning a gold medal in Biathlon – Women's 6 kilometres, sitting.

Oksana won the Laureus World Sportsperson of the Year with a Disability in 2020.

== Early life ==
Oksana was born Oksana Oleksandrivna Bondarchuk (Ukrainian: Оксана Олександрівна Бондарчук) on June 19, 1989, in Khmelnytskyi, Ukraine, three years after the Chernobyl nuclear disaster. The nuclear disaster resulted in several radiation-induced birth defects, including tibial hemimelia which resulted in different leg lengths, missing weight-bearing shinbones in her calves, webbed fingers with no thumbs, and six toes on each foot. She was abandoned by her parents shortly after birth and placed in an orphanage; she would continue to transition to two more orphanages until age 7. In the orphanages, she was frequently beaten and raped by men, sometimes more than once a day. The women who worked there pretended not to notice.

In the orphanage, Oksana witnessed the murder of another orphan girl, Lainey, who was also her best friend. The children in the orphanage were always on the brink of starvation and malnutrition. One night, Lainey and Oksana snuck out to get food, but Oksana slipped and hit a chair. Men found Lainey when they went to investigate the noise. Oksana managed to hide but heard them hit Lainey six times, causing her death.

In January 1997, at the age of 7, Oksana was adopted by Gay Masters, an unmarried American professor of communication disorders with no biological children. Later, she had both of her legs amputated above the knee—her left leg at age nine and her right leg at age 14—as they became increasingly painful and unable to support her weight. Oksana also had surgery to modify her fingers on each hand so they could function as thumbs.

After her arrival in the U.S., her mother, a professor at the University at Buffalo, moved to Louisville, Kentucky, in 2001 to take a faculty position at the University of Louisville. Masters graduated from the city's Atherton High School in 2008.

== Rowing career ==
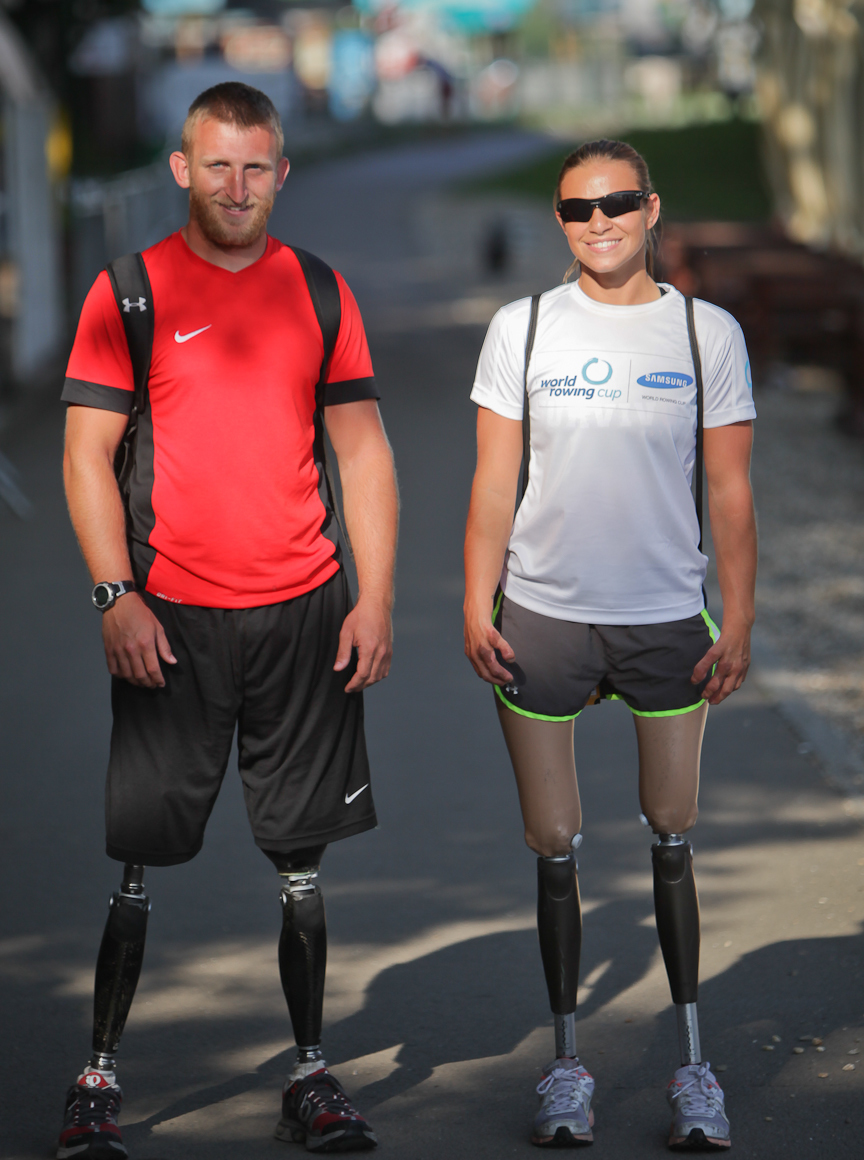
Rob Jones and Oksana Masters at the 2012 Adaptive World Championships in Belgrade, Serbia

Masters began adaptive rowing in 2002 at age 13, shortly before her right leg was amputated. She continued afterward and began adaptive rowing competitively. In 2010, she competed at the CRASH-B Sprints, setting a world record in the process. She was also the first adaptive sculler to compete in the Indianapolis Rowing Club "Head of the Eagle" regatta, winning the women's open singles event in the process.

In 2011, Masters and teammate Augusto Perez placed second at the Adaptive World Championship trials in West Windsor, New Jersey.

In preparation for the 2012 London Paralympic Games, Masters teamed with Rob Jones, a United States Marine Corps veteran who lost both legs to an IED explosion in Afghanistan. Masters and Jones called themselves "Team Bad Company" and proceeded to win both the Adaptive World Championships Trials and the Final Paralympic Qualification Regatta by substantial margins.

On September 2, at the 2012 London Paralympics, Masters and Jones finished third—winning the first-ever United States medal (bronze) in trunk and arms mixed double sculls with a final time of 4:05.56. They finished behind China (gold) and France (silver) while just edging out Great Britain.

Due to a back injury, Masters has given up competitive rowing since winning a bronze medal at the 2012 London Paralympics. She has since taken up para-cycling and cross country skiing.

== Cross-country skiing career ==
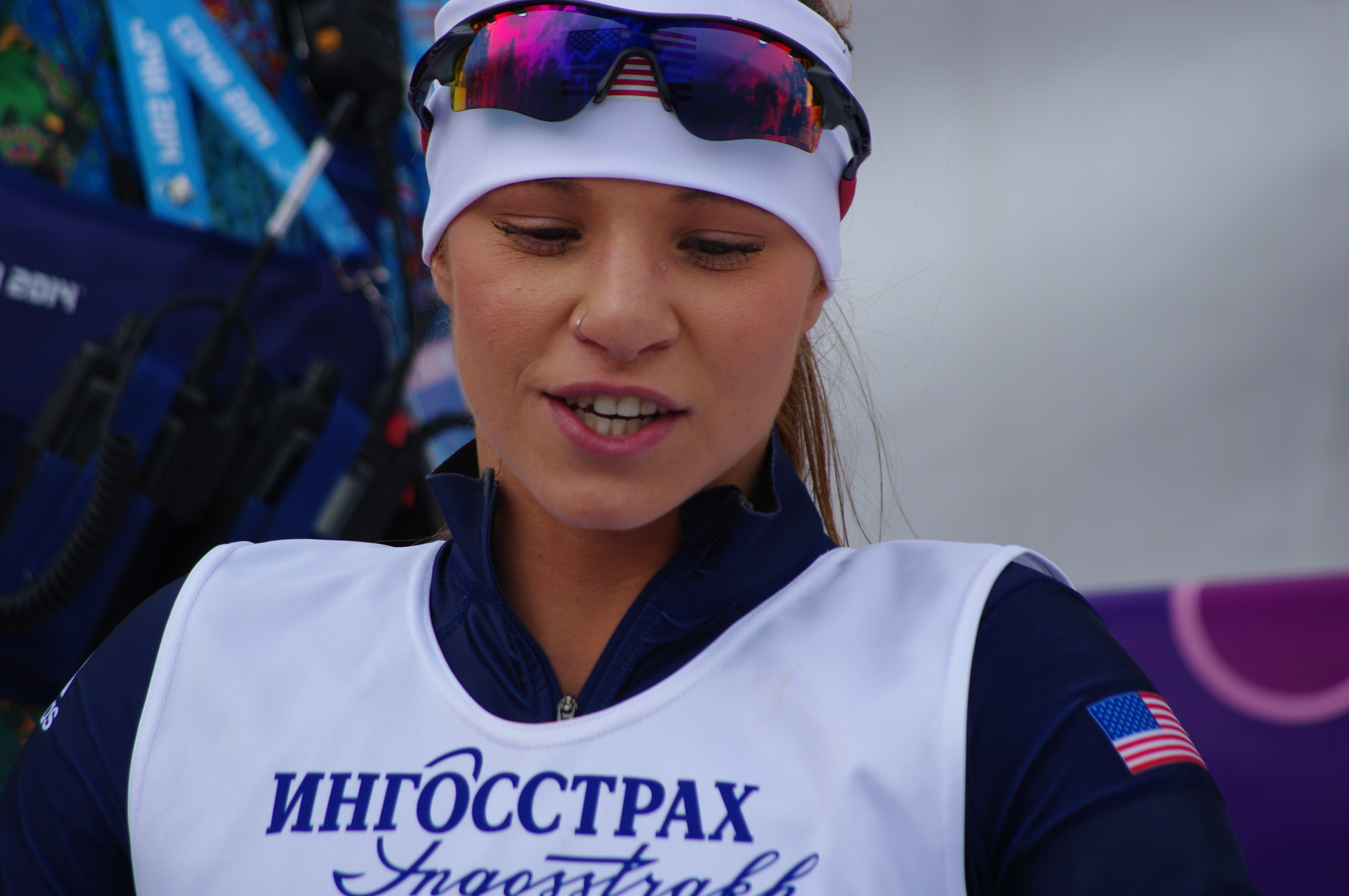
Oksana Masters at the 2014 Winter Paralympics in Sochi, Russia

Following her medal win in rowing at the 2012 Paralympics, Masters took up cross-country skiing. At the 2014 Winter Paralympics in Sochi, Russia, she won a silver medal in the 12 km Nordic and a bronze medal in the 5 km Nordic. She also placed fourth and eighth in two biathlon events. Masters sustained a back injury during this time and gave up rowing as a result. She took up cycling as part of the recovery process.

Masters won her first Paralympic gold medal at the 2018 Winter Paralympics in the cross-country skiing women's 1.5 km sprint classical event after experiencing multiple setbacks. She had injured her elbow three weeks prior to the Games and had also withdrawn from a biathlon event the day before after falling during the race. She won five medals total from those Games, three in cross-country and two in biathlon. She won the gold medal in the cross-country skiing's 5 km sitting event and the bronze medal in the cross-country skiing's 12 km sitting event. She won silver medals in the 6 km sitting biathlon event and the 12.5 km sitting biathlon event.

Masters won the silver medal in the women's 6 km sitting biathlon event at the 2021 World Para Snow Sports Championships held in Lillehammer, Norway. She also won the bronze medal in the women's 10 km sitting biathlon event. In cross-country skiing, she won the gold medal in the women's long-distance sitting event.

Masters won her first Paralympic gold medal in biathlon at the 2022 Winter Paralympics in the 6 km sitting biathlon event.

Masters has twice been nominated for an ESPY for her Nordic skiing in the category of Best Female Athlete with a Disability.

== Cycling career ==
Masters has won two green World Cup medals and a bronze medal at the UCI Para-Cycling Worlds. She competed in hand-cycling events in the 2016 Paralympic Games in Rio, where she placed 4th in the road race event and 5th in the timed trial. At the 2020 Paralympic Games in Tokyo she finished first in the time trial and the road race, her first Paralympic gold medals at the Summer Games.

In the 2024 Paris Paralympic games, Masters again won double gold in the Women's H4-5 Individual Time Trial as well as the H5 road race. In the road race, Masters broke away in the final kilometer from a pack of 3 other riders to win. The drama came from China's rider who refused repeatedly to take her turn at the front of the pack.

== Personal life ==
Masters is engaged to fellow American summer and winter Paralympian Aaron Pike.

== Media appearances ==
Masters' life story has been featured in a number of media sources, including Spirit, Southwest Airlines' in-flight magazine and Sports Illustrated. She was also named one of the "11 Hottest Paralympic Athletes" by msn NOW, was named one of ten U.S. athletes to watch by The Guardian, and posed nude for ESPN The Magazine's annual "The Body Issue". Apple featured her in a "Making a difference. One app at a time." video, where she explains how her life changed with iOS apps.

== Author ==
- The Hard Parts: A Story of Courage and Triumph Hardcover – February 21, 2023.
