= Kendall Gretsch =

American Para triathlete, biathlete, and cross-country skier (born 1992)

Personal information
- Born: April 2, 1992 (age 34) Downers Grove, Illinois, U.S.
- Height: 5 ft 0 in (152 cm)
- Weight: 110 lb (50 kg)

Sport
- Country: United States
- Sport: Para Nordic skiing (biathlon and cross-country), Para triathlon
- Disability class: LW11.5
Medal record
Representing United States
Women's Para biathlon
Winter Paralympics
Gold medal – first place	2018 Pyeongchang	6 km sitting
Gold medal – first place	2022 Beijing	10 km sitting
Gold medal – first place	2026 Milano Cortina	Sprint pursuit sitting
Silver medal – second place	2022 Beijing	12.5 km sitting
Silver medal – second place	2026 Milano Cortina	Sprint sitting
Bronze medal – third place	2022 Beijing	6 km sitting
Bronze medal – third place	2026 Milano Cortina	12.5 km sitting
Women's Para cross-country skiing
Winter Paralympics
Gold medal – first place	2018 Pyeongchang	12 km sitting
Bronze medal – third place	2026 Milano Cortina	10 km sitting
Women's Para triathlon
Summer Paralympics
Gold medal – first place	2020 Tokyo	PTWC
Silver medal – second place	2024 Paris	PTWC
World Championships
Gold medal – first place	2014 Edmonton	PT1
Gold medal – first place	2015 Chicago	PT1
Gold medal – first place	2016 Rotterdam	PT1
Gold medal – first place	2023 Ponteverde	Mixed relay
Gold medal – first place	2024 Torremolinos	PTWC
Gold medal – first place	2024 Torremolinos	Mixed relay
Silver medal – second place	2019 Lausanne	PTWC
Silver medal – second place	2022 Abu Dhabi	PTWC
Silver medal – second place	2023 Ponteverde	PTWC
Silver medal – second place	2026 Pontevedra	PTWC
Americas Championships
Gold medal – first place	2014 Dallas	PT1
Gold medal – first place	2015 Monterrey	PT1
Gold medal – first place	2016 Sarasota	PT1
Gold medal – first place	2019 Sarasota-Bradenton	PTWC
Gold medal – first place	2021 Pleasant Prairie	PTWC

Kendall Gretsch (born April 2, 1992) is an American Para triathlete, biathlete, and cross-country skier. She was born with spina bifida. She has competed in both Summer Paralympics and Winter Paralympics and has won gold medals at both competitions.

== Education ==
Gretsch attended Downers Grove North High School. Gretsch studied at Washington University in St. Louis where she earned a degree in Bio Medical Engineering. She was a member of Alpha Omicron Pi sorority.

== Career ==
=== 2018 Winter Paralympics ===
Gretsch made her Paralympic debut at the 2018 Winter Paralympics and created history in her first Paralympic appearance after claiming a gold medal in the women's 6km sitting biathlon event. She eventually became the first American to claim a medal in a biathlon event in either the Olympics or the Paralympics. Her medal was also the first gold medal achieved by the United States at the 2018 Winter Paralympics in the opening day of the multi-sport event.

Gretsch also repeated her gold medal hunt at the 2018 Winter Paralympics after emerging as the winner in the women's 12km sitting event which is a part of the cross-country skiing event. This was her second Paralympic gold medal and the first gold medal that she achieved in cross-country skiing.

Gretsch was one of two Paralympic gold winners representing the United States, the other being Daniel Cnossen, the first male biathlete to achieve a medal in either the Olympics or the Paralympics.

=== 2020 Summer Paralympics ===
Gretsch made her debut Summer Paralympics appearance representing United States at the 2020 Summer Paralympics in paratriathlon event and it also marked her second Paralympic appearance after featuring in 2018 Winter Paralympics. She went onto clinch her first Summer Paralympic medal in her maiden Summer Paralympic appearance. She became a Paralympic champion in the women's PTWC paratriathlon event whereas she notably defeated reigning world champion Lauren Parker of Australia to claim gold medal in the relevant competition.

She also became the fifth American and third American woman to have clinched gold medals in both Summer Paralympics and Winter Paralympics.

=== 2021 World Para Snow Sports Championships ===
She won the gold medal in the women's 7.5 km sitting cross-country skiing event at the 2021 World Para Snow Sports Championships held in Lillehammer, Norway. She also won gold medals in the women's 10 km sitting biathlon event and in the women's Individual sitting biathlon event. In cross-country skiing, she won the silver medal in the women's long-distance sitting event.

=== 2022 Winter Paralympics ===
She competed in the Women's 6 kilometres Biathlon seated, winning a bronze medal.
