= Vilde Nilsen =

Norwegian Para cross-country skier and biathlete (born 2001)

Personal information
- Nationality: Norwegian
- Born: 12 January 2001 (age 25)

Sport
- Country: Norway
- Sport: Para Nordic skiing (Para cross-country skiing and Para biathlon)
- Disability class: LW4
Medal record
Women's Para cross-country skiing
Representing Norway
Paralympic Games
Gold medal – first place	2026 Milano Cortina	Sprint standing
Silver medal – second place	2018 Pyeongchang	1.5km sprint classical standing
Silver medal – second place	2022 Beijing	1.5km sprint standing
Silver medal – second place	2026 Milano Cortina	10 km standing
Silver medal – second place	2026 Milano Cortina	20 km standing
Bronze medal – third place	2022 Beijing	4 × 2.5 km relay open
Bronze medal – third place	2026 Milano Cortina	4 × 2.5 km relay open

Vilde Nilsen (born 12 January 2001) is a Norwegian Para cross-country skier and biathlete.

== Career ==
She made her Paralympic debut during the 2018 Winter Paralympics at the age of 17. Vilde Nilsen claimed a silver medal in the women's 1.5km sprint classic standing cross-country skiing event as a part of the 2018 Winter Paralympics, which is also her first Paralympic medal.

She won the gold medal in the women's 10 km standing cross-country skiing event at the 2021 World Para Snow Sports Championships held in Lillehammer, Norway. She also won the silver medal in the women's long-distance standing cross-country skiing event.
