= Liudmyla Liashenko =

Ukrainian Para cross-country skier and biathlete (born 1993)

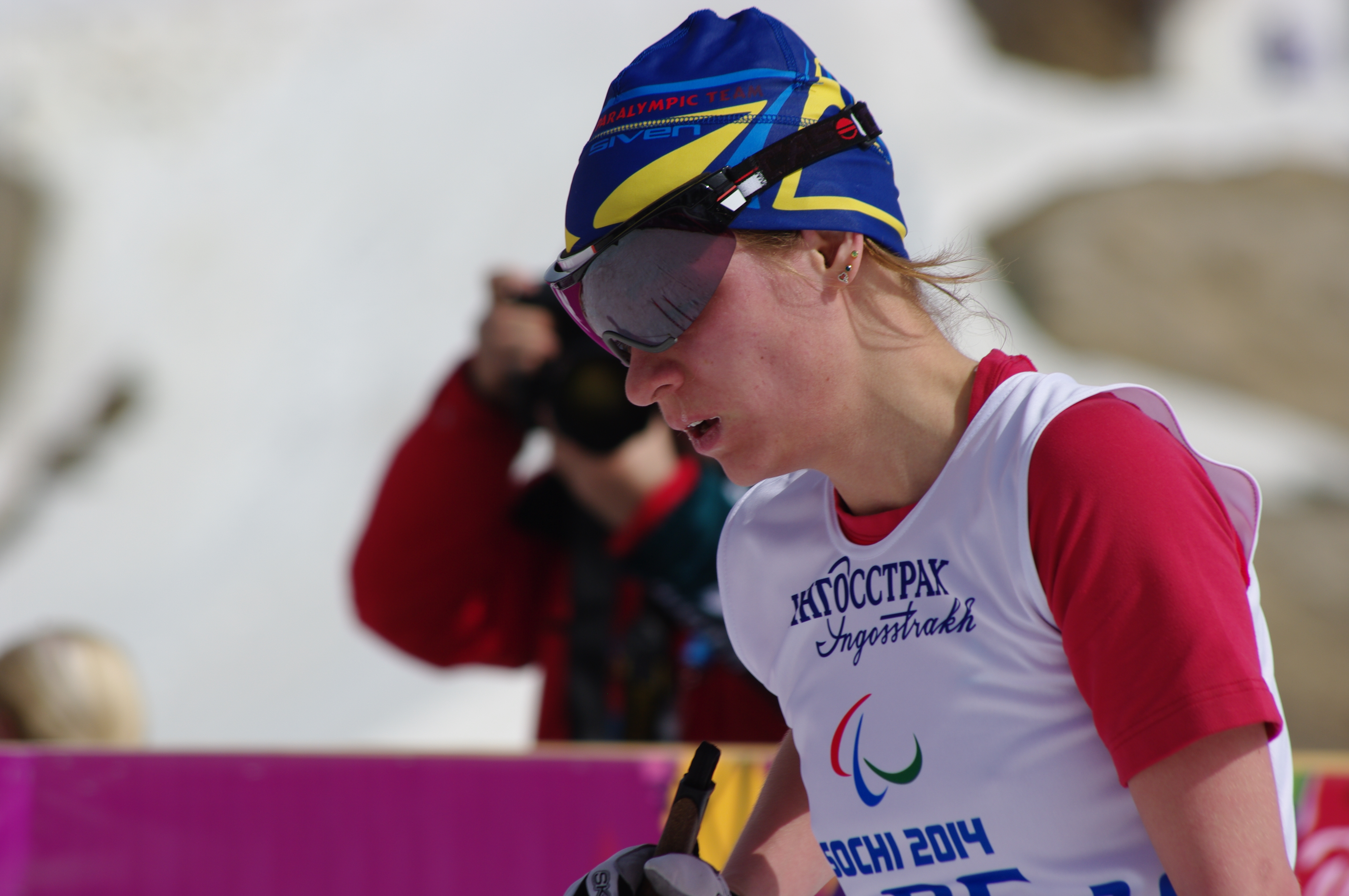

Personal information
- Nickname: Liuda
- Nationality: Ukrainian
- Born: May 17, 1993 (age 33)

Sport
- Country: Ukraine
- Sport: Para Nordic skiing (Para cross-country skiing and Para biathlon)
- Disability class: LW6/8
Medal record
Representing Ukraine
Winter Paralympics
Women's Para biathlon
| Gold medal – first place | 2022 Beijing | 12.5 km standing |
| Silver medal – second place | 2022 Beijing | 6 km standing |
| Bronze medal – third place | 2018 Pyeongchang | 6 km standing |
| Bronze medal – third place | 2022 Beijing | 10 km standing |
| Bronze medal – third place | 2026 Milano Cortina | Sprint standing |
Women's Para cross-country skiing
| Gold medal – first place | 2018 Pyeongchang | 4 x 2.5 km mixed relay |
| Silver medal – second place | 2026 Milano Cortina | 4 × 2.5 km mixed relay |

Liudmyla Liashenko (born 17 May 1993) is a Ukrainian Para cross-country skier and biathlete. She has competed at the Paralympics in 2014, 2018 and 2022.

== Career ==
Liudmyla Liashenko claimed her first Paralympic medal, bronze, in the women's 6km standing biathlon event, which was ultimately the first medal received by Ukraine at the 2018 Winter Paralympics.

She won the bronze medal in the women's 10 km standing cross-country skiing event at the 2021 World Para Snow Sports Championships held in Lillehammer, Norway. She also won the gold medal in the women's long-distance standing cross-country skiing event. In biathlon, she won the silver medal in the women's 6 km standing event. She also won the gold medal in the women's 10 km standing biathlon event.
