= Sighted guide =

Helper who guides a blind sportsperson

A sighted guide is a person who guides a person with blindness or vision impairment.

== Sports ==
=== Paralympic Games ===
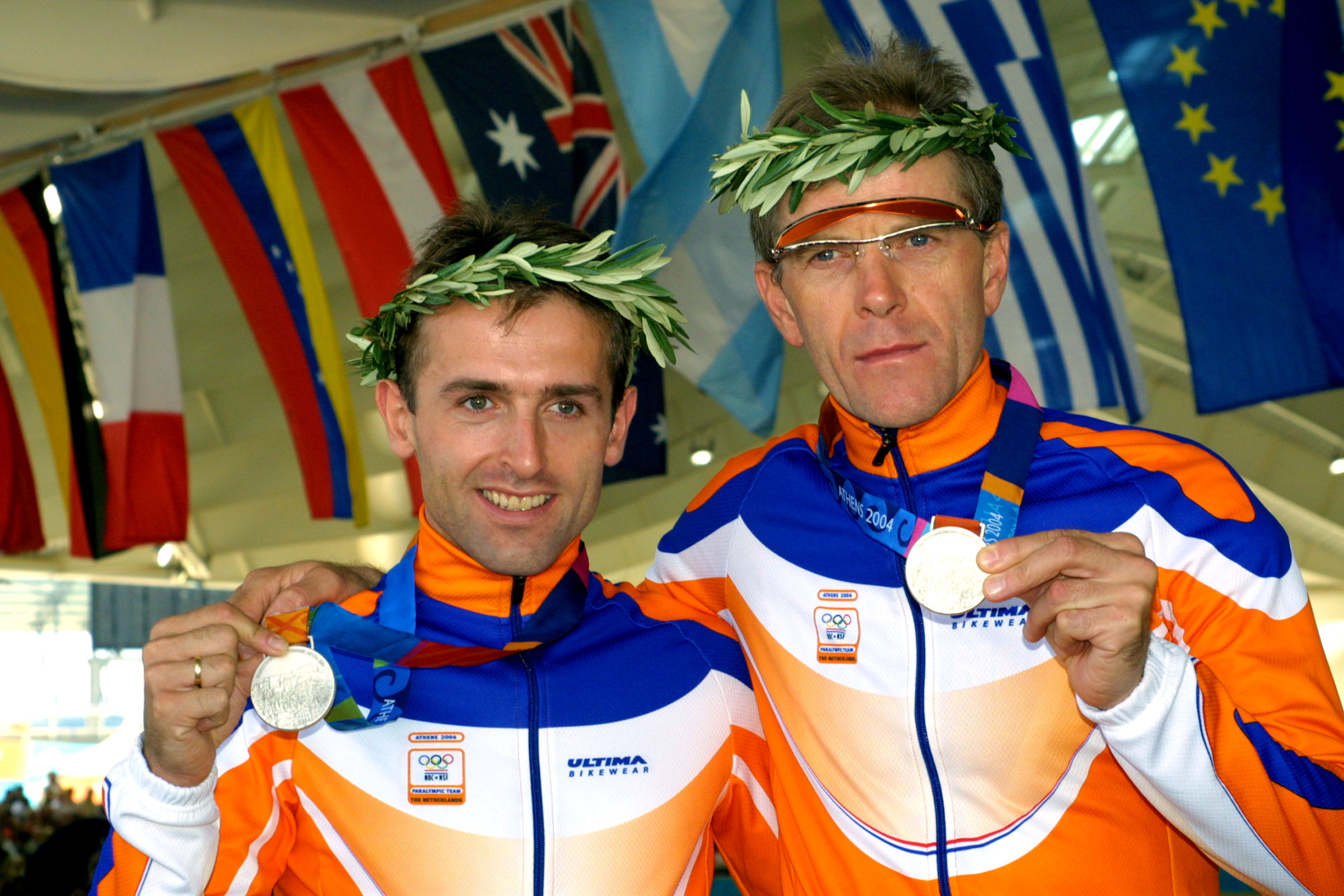
Pilot Pascal Schoots (L) and Jan Mulder (R) won silver medals in cycling at the 2004 Summer Paralympics in Athens

At the Paralympic Games there are various classifications of athletes with a visual impairment.

Rules are according to the International Blind Sports Association (IBSA) and the International Paralympic Committee (IPC).

The sighted guides are such a close and essential part of the competition, that the athlete with a visual impairment and the guide are considered a team, and both athletes are medal candidates.

==== Winter ====
At the Winter Paralympics there are three classifications of athletes with a visual impairment:

- B1 (no useful vision)
- B2 (minimal useful vision)
- B3 (some useful vision).

A sighted guide is required for B1 and B2, and optional for B3.

Nordic skiing:
The guide can lead, follow, or ski next to the athlete with a visual impairment. The guide assists with voice instruction only. No physical contact allowed.

Alpine skiing:
The start must have an adequate space for the guide.

- Combined
- Downhill
- Giant slalom
- Slalom
- Super-G

==== Summer ====
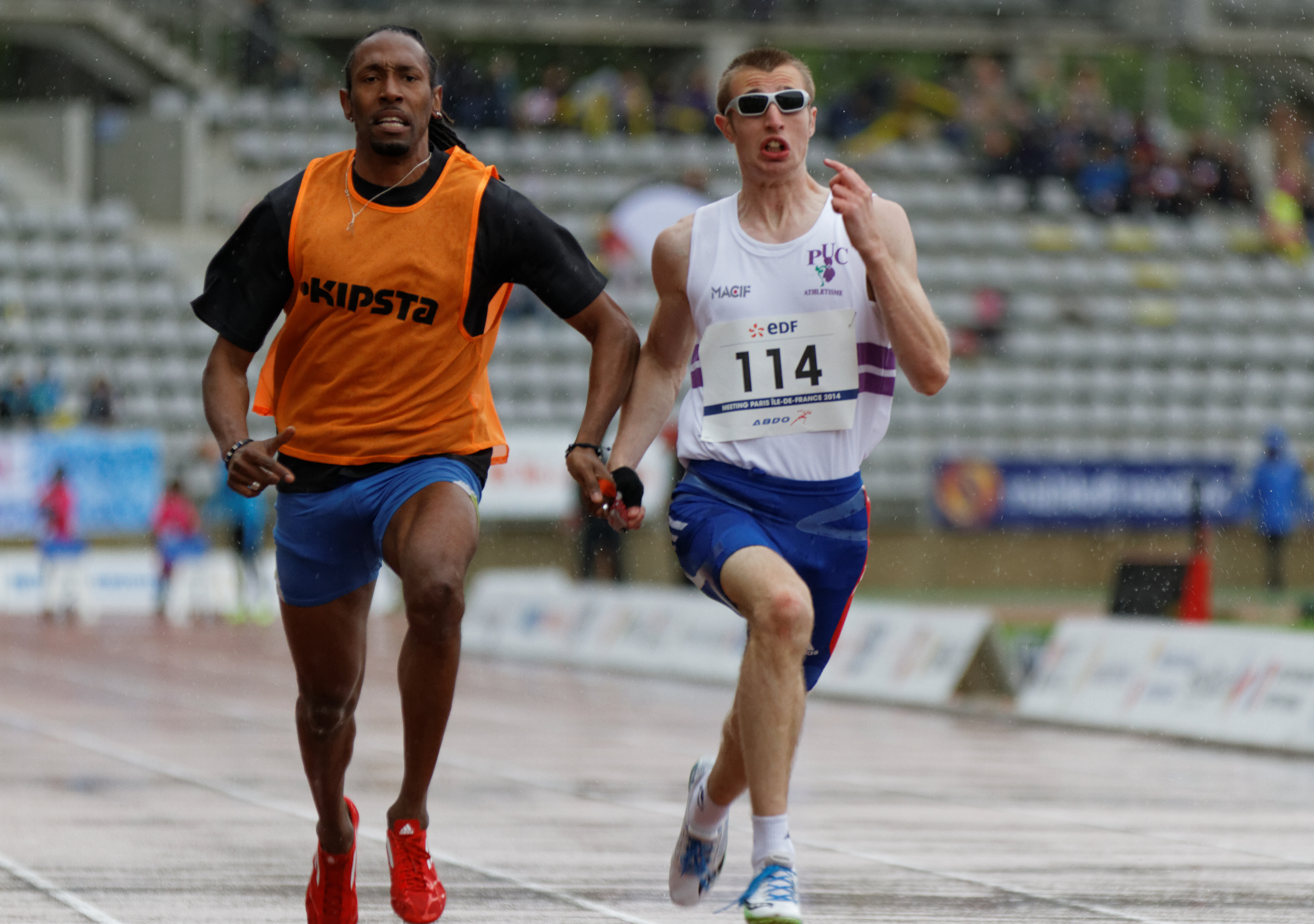
Timothée Adolphe and his sighted guide Cédric Felip

Athletics:
In athletics the sighted guides can win a medal.

Cycling: Pilot
Equestrian:
Football 5-a-side:
Triathlon:

== See also ==
- Guide dog
- White cane
