= China at the 2026 Winter Paralympics =

- Flag of China
- IPC code: CHN
- NPC: China Administration of Sports for Persons with Disabilities

in Milan & Cortina d'Ampezzo, Italy 6 March 2026 – 15 March 2026
- Competitors: 70 (51 men and 19 women) in 6 sports
- Flag bearers (opening): Liu Sitong & Ji Lijia
- Flag bearers (closing): Wang Meng & Cai Jiayun
- Medals Ranked 1st: Gold 15 Silver 13 Bronze 16 Total 44

Winter Paralympics appearances (overview)
- 2002; 2006; 2010; 2014; 2018; 2022; 2026

China was represented at the 2026 Winter Paralympics in Milan & Cortina d'Ampezzo, Italy, which took place between 6–15 March 2026.

== Medallists ==
Medal	Name	Sport	Event	Date
Gold	Cai Jiayun	Para biathlon	Men's sprint, standing	7 March
Gold	Wang Yue; Guide: Chen Guoming	Para biathlon	Women's sprint, visually impaired	7 March
Gold	Liu Zixu	Para biathlon	Men's individual, sitting	8 March
Gold	Wu Zhongwei	Para snowboard	Men's snowboard cross, SB-LL1	8 March
Gold	Ji Lijia	Para snowboard	Men's snowboard cross, SB-UL	8 March
Gold	Cai Jiayun	Para biathlon	Men's individual, standing	8 March
Gold	Wang Yue; Guide: Chen Guoming	Para biathlon	Women's individual, visually impaired	8 March
Gold	Dang Hesong; Guide: Lu Hongda	Para biathlon	Men's individual, visually impaired	8 March
Gold	Liu Zixu	Para cross-country skiing	Men's sprint, sitting	10 March
Gold	Wang Meng; Yang Jinqiao	Wheelchair curling	Mixed doubles	11 March
Gold	Cai Jiayun	Para biathlon	Men's sprint pursuit, standing	13 March
Gold	Yu Shuang; Guide: Shang Jincai	Para biathlon	Men's sprint pursuit, visually impaired	13 March
Gold	Zhang Wenjing	Para alpine skiing	Women's slalom, sitting	14 March
Gold	Dang Hesong; Guide: Lu Hongda; Wang Tao; Wang Chenyang; Yu Shuang; Guide: Shang Jincai	Para cross-country skiing	Open 4 × 2.5 kilometre relay	14 March
Gold	Wang Chenyang	Para cross-country skiing	Men's 20 kilometre freestyle, standing	15 March
Silver	Liu Mengtao	Para biathlon	Men's sprint, sitting	7 March
Silver	Liu Xiaobin	Para biathlon	Men's sprint, standing	7 March
Silver	Mao Zhongwu	Para biathlon	Men's individual, sitting	8 March
Silver	Zhao Zhiqing	Para biathlon	Women's individual, standing	8 March
Silver	Zhu Yonggang	Para snowboard	Men's snowboard cross, SB-UL	8 March
Silver	Yu Shuang; Guide: Shang Jincai	Para cross-country skiing	Men's sprint classical, visually impaired	10 March
Silver	Mao Zhongwu	Para cross-country skiing	Men's 10 kilometres, sitting	11 March
Silver	Wang Pengyao	Para snowboard	Men's banked slalom, SB-UL	13 March
Silver	Wang Yue; Guide: Chen Guoming	Para biathlon	Women's sprint pursuit, visually impaired	13 March
Silver	Zhu Wenjing	Para alpine skiing	Women's slalom, standing	14 March
Silver	Wang Haitao; Chen Jianxin; Zhang Mingliang; Li Nana; Zhang Qiang	Wheelchair curling	Mixed team	14 March
Silver	Mao Zhongwu	Para cross-country skiing	Men's 20 kilometre, sitting	15 March
Silver	Huang Lingxin	Para cross-country skiing	Men's 20 kilometre freestyle, standing	15 March
Bronze	Liu Sitong	Para alpine skiing	Women's downhill, sitting	7 March
Bronze	Liu Zixu	Para biathlon	Men's sprint, sitting	7 March
Bronze	Wang Xinyu	Para snowboard	Women's snowboard cross, SB-LL2	8 March
Bronze	Liu Sitong	Para alpine skiing	Women's super-G, sitting	9 March
Bronze	Wang Shiyu	Para cross-country skiing	Women's sprint, sitting	10 March
Bronze	Zhu Wenjing	Para alpine skiing	Women's super combined, standing	10 March
Bronze	Liu Sitong	Para alpine skiing	Women's super combined, sitting	10 March
Bronze	Cong Jihong; Guide: Liu Jiaxuan	Para cross-country skiing	Women's sprint classical, visually impaired	10 March
Bronze	Zheng Peng	Para cross-country skiing	Men's 10 kilometres, sitting	11 March
Bronze	Liu Sitong	Para alpine skiing	Women's giant slalom, sitting	12 March
Bronze	Jiang Zihao	Para snowboard	Men's banked slalom, SB-UL	13 March
Bronze	Liu Zixu	Para biathlon	Men's sprint pursuit, sitting	13 March
Bronze	Mao Zhongwu; Zheng Peng; Wang Yue; Guide: Chen Guoming; Huang Lingxin	Para cross-country skiing	Mixed 4 × 2.5 kilometre relay	14 March
Bronze	Liu Xiaobin	Para cross-country skiing	Men's 20 kilometre freestyle, standing	15 March
Bronze	Wang Yue; Guide: Chen Guoming	Para cross-country skiing	Women's 20 kilometre freestyle, visually impaired	15 March
Bronze	China national para ice hockey team: Wang Wei; Lyu Zhi; Wang Zhidong; Che Hang; Song Xiaodong; Shen Yifeng; Wang Jujiang; Zhang Zheng; Ji Yanzhao; Cui Yutao; Zhu Zhanfu; Tian Jintao; Qiu Dianpeng; Li Hongguan; Chen Hongyu; He Haoran; Liu Wenxu	Para ice hockey	Open tournament	15 March

Medals by sport
Sport	1st place, gold medalist(s)	2nd place, silver medalist(s)	3rd place, bronze medalist(s)	Total
Para biathlon	8	5	2	15
Para snowboard	2	2	2	6
Para cross-country skiing	3	4	6	13
Para alpine skiing	1	1	5	7
Wheelchair curling	1	1	0	2
Para ice hockey	0	0	1	1
Total	15	13	16	44

Medals by date
Day	Date	1st place, gold medalist(s)	2nd place, silver medalist(s)	3rd place, bronze medalist(s)	Total
Day 1	7 March	2	2	2	6
Day 2	8 March	6	3	1	10
Day 3	9 March	0	0	1	1
Day 4	10 March	1	1	4	6
Day 5	11 March	1	1	1	3
Day 6	12 March	0	0	1	1
Day 7	13 March	2	2	2	6
Day 8	14 March	2	2	1	5
Day 9	15 March	1	2	3	6
Total		15	13	16	44

Medals by gender
Gender	1st place, gold medalist(s)	2nd place, silver medalist(s)	3rd place, bronze medalist(s)	Total
Female	3	3	9	15
Male	11	9	5	25
Mixed	1	1	2	4
Total	15	13	16	44

== Competitors ==
The following is the list of number of competitors participating at the Games per sport/discipline.

Sport	Men	Women	Total
Para alpine skiing	8	5	13
Para biathlon	13	8	21
Para cross-country skiing	13	8	21
Para ice hockey	17	0	17
Para snowboard	8	4	12
Wheelchair curling	5	2	7
Total	51	19	70

== Para alpine skiing ==
Men

Athlete	Class	Event	Run 1		Run 2		Total	
Athlete	Class	Event	Time	Rank	Time	Rank	Time	Rank
Chen Liang	LW12–2	Downhill, sitting	—N/a				1:29.18	11
Chen Liang	LW12–2	Super-G, sitting	—N/a				DNF	
Chen Liang	LW12–2	Giant slalom, sitting	DNF					
Chen Liang	LW12–2	Slalom, sitting	50.15	11	43.93	1	1:34.08	7
Chen Liang	LW12–2	Super combined, sitting	1:21.22	14	43.54	2	2:04.76	10
Dong Yiheng; Guide: Che Hang	AS3	Giant slalom, visually impaired	1:13.02	10	DNF			
Dong Yiheng; Guide: Che Hang	AS3	Slalom, visually impaired	DNF					
Li Biao	LW6/8–1	Downhill, standing	—N/a				DNF	
Li Biao	LW6/8–1	Super-G, standing	—N/a				1:21.78	22
Li Biao	LW6/8–1	Giant slalom, standing	1:13.98	21	1:15.56	22	2:29.54	21
Li Biao	LW6/8–1	Slalom, standing	DNF					
Li Biao	LW6/8–1	Super combined, standing	1:22.58	14	50.55	12	2:13.13	12
Li Xiang	LW10-1	Giant slalom, sitting	1:18.30	18	1:15.36	14	2:33.66	16
Li Xiang	LW10-1	Slalom, sitting	49.84	9	48.26	6	1:38.10	12
Liang Zilu	LW12–2	Downhill, sitting	—N/a				1:25.28	7
Liang Zilu	LW12–2	Super-G, sitting	—N/a				1:16.86	9
Liang Zilu	LW12–2	Giant slalom, sitting	DNF					
Liang Zilu	LW12–2	Slalom, sitting	49.57	7	44.46	2	1:34.03	6
Liang Zilu	LW12–2	Super combined, sitting	1:19.09	9	43.81	5	2:02.90	7
Sun Hongsheng	LW5/7–1	Downhill, standing	—N/a				DNF	
Sun Hongsheng	LW5/7–1	Super-G, standing	—N/a				1:23.63	25
Sun Hongsheng	LW5/7–1	Giant slalom, standing	DNF					
Sun Hongsheng	LW5/7–1	Slalom, standing	DNF					
Sun Hongsheng	LW5/7–1	Super combined, standing	1:26.85	17	50.87	13	2:17.72	14
Wang Xingdong; Guide: Chen Zhicheng	AS4	Downhill, visually impaired	—N/a				1:22.55	5
Wang Xingdong; Guide: Chen Zhicheng	AS4	Super-G, visually impaired	—N/a				1:17.43	7
Wang Xingdong; Guide: Chen Zhicheng	AS4	Giant slalom, visually impaired	1:08.18	5	1:11.24	7	2:19.42	5
Wang Xingdong; Guide: Chen Zhicheng	AS4	Slalom, visually impaired	50.95	5	48.05	5	1:39.00	5
Wang Xingdong; Guide: Chen Zhicheng	AS4	Super combined, visually impaired	1:19.44	8	46.10	6	2:05.54	6
Yan Gong	LW2	Downhill, standing	—N/a				1:27.98	19
Yan Gong	LW2	Super-G, standing	—N/a				DNF	
Yan Gong	LW2	Giant slalom, standing	1:18.33	26	DNS			
Yan Gong	LW2	Slalom, standing	DNF					
Yan Gong	LW2	Super combined, standing	1:23.35	16	49.53	10	2:12.88	11

Women

Athlete	Class	Event	Run 1		Run 2		Total	
Athlete	Class	Event	Time	Rank	Time	Rank	Time	Rank
Guo Jiaxin	LW6/8–2	Super-G, standing	—N/a				1:29.52	12
Guo Jiaxin	LW6/8–2	Giant slalom, standing	1:23.60	15	1:22.91	12	2:46.51	13
Guo Jiaxin	LW6/8–2	Slalom, standing	DNS					
Guo Jiaxin	LW6/8–2	Super combined, standing	1:30.06	14	DNF			
Liu Sitong	LW12-2	Downhill, sitting	—N/a				1:31.27	3rd place, bronze medalist(s)
Liu Sitong	LW12-2	Super-G, sitting	—N/a				1:24.91	3rd place, bronze medalist(s)
Liu Sitong	LW12-2	Giant slalom, sitting	1:16.38	3	1:18.41	2	2:34.79	3rd place, bronze medalist(s)
Liu Sitong	LW12-2	Slalom, sitting	44.82	5	45.04	4	1:29.86	5
Liu Sitong	LW12-2	Super combined, sitting	1:26.29	3	48.24	3	2:14.53	3rd place, bronze medalist(s)
Zhang Mengqiu	LW9-2	Downhill, standing	—N/a				1:29.66	8
Zhang Mengqiu	LW9-2	Super-G, standing	—N/a				DNF	
Zhang Mengqiu	LW9-2	Giant slalom, standing	1:14.59	5	1:17.11	7	2:31.70	5
Zhang Mengqiu	LW9-2	Slalom, standing	44.75	6	44.66	3	1:29.41	4
Zhang Mengqiu	LW9-2	Super combined, standing	1:22.09	5	48.78	3	2:10.87	4
Zhang Wenjing	LW12-1	Downhill, sitting	—N/a				1:32.67	4
Zhang Wenjing	LW12-1	Super-G, sitting	—N/a				DNF	
Zhang Wenjing	LW12-1	Giant slalom, sitting	1:24.19	7	1:25.49	1	2:49.68	6
Zhang Wenjing	LW12-1	Slalom, sitting	43.03	2	44.66	2	1:27.69	1st place, gold medalist(s)
Zhang Wenjing	LW12-1	Super combined, sitting	1:31.71	6	46.89	1	2:18.60	4
Zhu Wenjing	LW9-2	Downhill, standing	—N/a				1:32.24	9
Zhu Wenjing	LW9-2	Super-G, standing	—N/a				1:19.73	5
Zhu Wenjing	LW9-2	Giant slalom, standing	1:15.25	6	1:16.69	6	2:31.94	6
Zhu Wenjing	LW9-2	Slalom, standing	44.06	4	44.38	2	1:28.44	2nd place, silver medalist(s)
Zhu Wenjing	LW9-2	Super combined, standing	1:21.73	4	48.96	4	2:10.69	3rd place, bronze medalist(s)

== Para biathlon ==
Men

Athlete	Class	Event	Qualification			Final		
Athlete	Class	Event	Missed shots	Time	Rank	Missed shots	Time	Rank
Cai Jiayun	LW8	Individual, standing	—N/a			1 (1+0+0+0)	30:24.1	1st place, gold medalist(s)
Cai Jiayun	LW8	Sprint, standing	—N/a			0 (0+0)	17:13.6	1st place, gold medalist(s)
Cai Jiayun	LW8	Sprint pursuit, standing	1 (1+0)	9:58.1	2 Q	0	10:33.4	1st place, gold medalist(s)
Dang Hesong; Guide: Lu Hongda	NS2	Individual, standing	—N/a			0 (0+0+0+0)	31:31.9	1st place, gold medalist(s)
Dang Hesong; Guide: Lu Hongda	NS2	Sprint, visually impaired	—N/a			1 (1+0)	18:44.5	4
Dang Hesong; Guide: Lu Hongda	NS2	Sprint pursuit, visually impaired	1 (0+1)	11:03.3	7 Q	3 (0+3)	13:28.2	7
Liu Mengtao	LW12	Individual, sitting	—N/a			2 (1+1+0+0)	37:59.1	8
Liu Mengtao	LW12	Sprint, sitting	—N/a			0 (0+0)	20:04.8	2nd place, silver medalist(s)
Liu Mengtao	LW12	Sprint pursuit, sitting	2 (0+2)	9:04.6	9 Q	1 (0+1)	10:18.3	4
Liu Xiaobin	LW5/7	Individual, standing	—N/a			2 (0+1+0+1)	31:30.6	4
Liu Xiaobin	LW5/7	Sprint, standing	—N/a			0 (0+0)	17:35.4	2nd place, silver medalist(s)
Liu Xiaobin	LW5/7	Sprint pursuit, standing	2 (2+0)	10:27.9	8 Q	4 (2+2)	12:13.2	7
Liu Zixu	LW12	Individual, sitting	—N/a			0 (0+0+0+0)	34:38.1	1st place, gold medalist(s)
Liu Zixu	LW12	Sprint, sitting	—N/a			0 (0+0)	20:13.1	3rd place, bronze medalist(s)
Liu Zixu	LW12	Sprint pursuit, sitting	0	8:37.7	2 Q	2 (0+2)	10:11.5	3rd place, bronze medalist(s)
Mao Zhongwu	LW11	Individual, sitting	—N/a			1 (0+0+1+0)	35:06.5	2nd place, silver medalist(s)
Mao Zhongwu	LW11	Sprint, sitting	—N/a			2 (1+1)	20:40.0	7
Mao Zhongwu	LW11	Sprint pursuit, sitting	4 (2+2)	9:44.7	16 Q	2 (0+2)	11:17.6	11
Wang Tao	LW12	Individual, sitting	—N/a			6 (3+0+2+1)	41:44.8	14
Wang Tao	LW12	Sprint, sitting	—N/a			3 (3+0)	22:05.8	13
Wang Tao	LW12	Sprint pursuit, sitting	0	9:00.9	6 Q	1 (0+1)	10:51.2	7
Wu Junbao	LW5/7	Individual, standing	—N/a			1 (0+0+0+1)	31:51.9	6
Wu Junbao	LW5/7	Sprint, standing	—N/a			1 (1+0)	18:42.5	8
Wu Junbao	LW5/7	Sprint pursuit, standing	0	10:10.7	4 Q	4 (2+2)	12:26.1	8
Yu Shuang; Guide: Shang Jincai	NS3	Sprint, visually impaired	—N/a			2 (1+1)	19:01.3	6
Yu Shuang; Guide: Shang Jincai	NS3	Sprint pursuit, visually impaired	1 (1+0)	10:27.0	3 Q	0	11:39.2	1st place, gold medalist(s)
Yuan Mingshou	LW5/7	Individual, standing	—N/a			2 (0+0+0+2)	33:47.7	12
Yuan Mingshou	LW5/7	Sprint, standing	—N/a			1 (1+0)	19:09.9	10
Yuan Mingshou	LW5/7	Sprint pursuit, standing	4 (1+3)	11:31.7	15 Q	3 (2+1)	14:20.9	14

Women

Athlete	Class	Event	Qualification			Final		
Athlete	Class	Event	Missed shots	Time	Rank	Missed shots	Time	Rank
Cong Jihong; Guide: Liu Jiaxuan	NS3	Individual, visually impaired	—N/a			6 (0+2+1+3)	44:18.8	11
Cong Jihong; Guide: Liu Jiaxuan	NS3	Sprint, visually impaired	—N/a			2 (2+0)	23:05.2	8
Cong Jihong; Guide: Liu Jiaxuan	NS3	Sprint pursuit, visually impaired	1 (1+0)	13:18.9	10 Q	2 (0+2)	15:51.7	8
Guo Yujie	LW8	Individual, standing	—N/a			3 (0+2+1+0)	37:15.8	8
Guo Yujie	LW8	Sprint, standing	—N/a			0 (0+0)	20:12.3	7
Guo Yujie	LW8	Sprint pursuit, standing	1 (1+0)	11:16.2	7 Q	3 (2+1)	13:41.5	8
Shan Yilin	LW12	Individual, sitting	—N/a			2 (1+0+0+1)	43:30.6	7
Shan Yilin	LW12	Sprint, sitting	—N/a			0 (0+0)	23:40.1	6
Shan Yilin	LW12	Sprint pursuit, sitting	2 (2+0)	11:28.0	9 Q	2 (0+2)	15:42.9	8
Wang Shiyu	LW12	Individual, sitting	—N/a			2 (0+0+1+1)	42:08.5	6
Wang Shiyu	LW12	Sprint, sitting	—N/a			1 (1+0)	24:18.1	9
Wang Shiyu	LW12	Sprint pursuit, sitting	2 (0+2)	10:34.1	3 Q	1 (0+1)	13:10.5	4
Wang Yue; Guide: Chen Guoming	NS2	Individual, visually impaired	—N/a			1 (0+1+0+0)	34:57.9	1st place, gold medalist(s)
Wang Yue; Guide: Chen Guoming	NS2	Sprint, visually impaired	—N/a			1 (0+1)	19:52.5	1st place, gold medalist(s)
Wang Yue; Guide: Chen Guoming	NS2	Sprint pursuit, visually impaired	3 (1+2)	12:22.6	4 Q	1 (1+0)	13:48.0	2nd place, silver medalist(s)
Yang Qianru; Guide: Wang Guanyu	NS3	Individual, visually impaired	—N/a			3 (1+0+2+0)	43:35.6	10
Yang Qianru; Guide: Wang Guanyu	NS3	Sprint, visually impaired	—N/a			1 (1+0)	25:32.1	13
Yang Qianru; Guide: Wang Guanyu	NS3	Sprint pursuit, visually impaired	3 (2+1)	15:02.7	12 Q	1 (1+0)	19:31.9	12
Zhai Yuxin	LW12	Individual, sitting	—N/a			1 (1+0+0+0)	41:13.9	5
Zhai Yuxin	LW12	Sprint, sitting	—N/a			0 (0+0)	23:20.5	5
Zhai Yuxin	LW12	Sprint pursuit, sitting	1 (1+0)	10:52.6	6 Q	0	13:26.9	5
Zhao Zhiqing	LW5/7	Individual, standing	—N/a			1 (0+1+0+0)	33:33.5	2nd place, silver medalist(s)
Zhao Zhiqing	LW5/7	Sprint, standing	—N/a			2 (1+1)	20:14.7	8
Zhao Zhiqing	LW5/7	Sprint pursuit, standing	0	10:44.3	1 Q	4 (2+2)	13:35.4	5

== Para cross-country skiing ==
Men

Athlete	Class	Event	Qualification		Semifinal		Final	
Athlete	Class	Event	Time	Rank	Time	Rank	Time	Rank
Cai Jiayun	LW8	Sprint classical, standing	2:30.18	6 Q	3:06.5	1 Q	2:44.2	4
Cai Jiayun	LW8	20 km freestyle, standing	—N/a				46:56.8	9
Dang Hesong; Guide: Lu Hongda	NS3	20 km freestyle, visually impaired	—N/a				44:34.3	6
Huang Lingxin	LW5/7	Sprint classical, standing	2:51.51	21	Did not advance			
Huang Lingxin	LW5/7	10 km classical, standing	—N/a				33:16.6	17
Huang Lingxin	LW5/7	20 km freestyle, standing	—N/a				47:11.6	2nd place, silver medalist(s)
Liu Mengtao	LW12	10 km, sitting	—N/a				26:06.1	12
Liu Xiaobin	LW5/7	20 km freestyle, standing	—N/a				47:48.8	3rd place, bronze medalist(s)
Liu Zixu	LW12	Sprint, sitting	2:16.28	10 Q	2:47.2	3 Q	2:28.9	1st place, gold medalist(s)
Mao Zhongwu	LW11	10 km, sitting	—N/a				24:22.1	2nd place, silver medalist(s)
Mao Zhongwu	LW11	20 km freestyle, sitting	—N/a				56:44.1	2nd place, silver medalist(s)
Wang Chenyang	LW5/7	Sprint classical, standing	2:52.09	23	Did not advance			
Wang Chenyang	LW5/7	10 km classical, standing	—N/a				30:00.3	9
Wang Chenyang	LW5/7	20 km freestyle, standing	—N/a				45:50.2	1st place, gold medalist(s)
Wang Tao	LW12	Sprint, sitting	2:13.52	4 Q	2:29.2	2 Q	2:32.6	6
Wang Tao	LW12	20 km freestyle, sitting	—N/a				54:16.9	8
Yu Shuang; Guide: Shang Jincai	NS3	Sprint classical, visually impaired	2:23.37	1 Q	2:29.5	2 Q	2:46.2	2nd place, silver medalist(s)
Yu Shuang; Guide: Shang Jincai	NS3	10 km classical, visually impaired	—N/a				30:08.5	4
Yu Shuang; Guide: Shang Jincai	NS3	20 km freestyle, visually impaired	—N/a				44:16.8	5
Yuan Mingshou	LW5/7	Sprint classical, standing	2:50.63	20	Did not advance			
Yuan Mingshou	LW5/7	10 km classical, standing	—N/a				34:16.9	20
Yuan Mingshou	LW5/7	20 km freestyle, standing	—N/a				51:22.3	13
Zheng Peng	LW11	Sprint, sitting	2:15.92	7 Q	3:10.3	5	Did not advance	
Zheng Peng	LW11	10 km, sitting	—N/a				24:24.5	3rd place, bronze medalist(s)
Zheng Peng	LW11	20 km freestyle, sitting	—N/a				57:46.0	6

Women

Athlete	Class	Event	Qualification		Semifinal		Final	
Athlete	Class	Event	Time	Rank	Time	Rank	Time	Rank
Cong Jihong; Guide: Liu Jiaxuan	NS3	Sprint classical, visually impaired	3:08.10	5 Q	3:29.2	2 Q	3:30.2	3rd place, bronze medalist(s)
Cong Jihong; Guide: Liu Jiaxuan	NS3	10 km classical, visually impaired	—N/a				36:28.1	4
Cong Jihong; Guide: Liu Jiaxuan	NS3	20 km freestyle, visually impaired	—N/a				52:50.5	4
Guo Yujie	LW8	Sprint classical, standing	3:12.38	10 Q	4:04.5	6	Did not advance	
Shan Yilin	LW12	10 km, sitting	—N/a				29:17.7	7
Wang Shiyu	LW12	Sprint, sitting	2:42.71	5 Q	3:17.3	3 Q	3:17.9	3rd place, bronze medalist(s)
Wang Shiyu	LW12	20 km freestyle, sitting	—N/a				1:04:24.8	6
Wang Yue; Guide: Chen Guoming	NS2	20 km freestyle, visually impaired	—N/a				48:58.7	3rd place, bronze medalist(s)
Yang Qianru; Guide: Wang Guanyu	NS3	Sprint classical, visually impaired	3:28.57	10	Did not advance			
Yang Qianru; Guide: Wang Guanyu	NS3	10 km classical, visually impaired	—N/a				40:28.9	8
Yang Qianru; Guide: Wang Guanyu	NS3	20 km freestyle, visually impaired	—N/a				1:00:39.6	9
Zhai Yuxin	LW12	10 km, sitting	—N/a				28:38.2	6
Zhai Yuxin	LW12	20 km freestyle, sitting	—N/a				1:05:05.3	7
Zhao Zhiqing	LW5/7	Sprint classical, standing	3:11.61	9 Q	3:42.2	3 Q	3:43.4	5
Zhao Zhiqing	LW5/7	20 km freestyle, standing	—N/a				51:59.2	8

Relay

Athletes	Event	Time	Rank
Mao Zhongwu; Zheng Peng; Wang Yue; Guide: Chen Guoming; Huang Lingxin	4 × 2.5km mixed relay	23:56.5	3rd place, bronze medalist(s)
Dang Hesong; Guide: Lu Hongda; Wang Tao; Wang Chenyang; Yu Shuang; Guide: Shang Jincai	4 × 2.5km open relay	21:54.4	1st place, gold medalist(s)

== Para ice hockey ==
Summary

Key:

- OT – Overtime
- GWS – Match decided by penalty-shootout

Team	Event	Group stage				Semifinal / Cl.	Final / BM / Pl.	
Team	Event	Opposition Score	Opposition Score	Opposition Score	Rank	Opposition Score	Opposition Score	Rank
China national team	Mixed tournament	Germany; W 12–0	Italy; W 11–1	United States; L 1–7	2 Q	Canada; L 2–4	Czech Republic; W 3–2	3rd place, bronze medalist(s)

Roster

Head coach: (Russia) Nikolay Sharshukov

- Wang Wei
- Lyu Zhi
- Wang Zhidong
- Che Hang
- Song Xiaodong
- Shen Yifeng
- Wang Jujiang
- Zhang Zheng
- Ji Yanzhao
- Cui Yutao
- Zhu Zhanfu
- Tian Jintao
- Qiu Dianpeng
- Li Hongguan
- Chen Hongyu
- He Haoran
- Liu Wenxu

Group play

Pos	Team	Pld	W	OTW	OTL	L	GF	GA	GD	Pts	Qualification
1	United States	3	3	0	0	0	34	2	+32	9	Semifinals
2	China	3	2	0	0	1	24	8	+16	6	Semifinals
3	Italy (H)	3	1	0	0	2	4	26	−22	3	5–8th place semifinals
4	Germany	3	0	0	0	3	1	27	−26	0	5–8th place semifinals

Source: Milano Cortina 2026
(H) Host

7 March 2026; 13:35	China	12–0 (5–0, 3–0, 4–0)	Germany	PalaItalia, Milan; Attendance: 2,787

Game reference

Ji Yanzhao
Goalies
Simon Kunst
Referee:
(Canada) Matthew Fergenbaum
Linesmen:
(United States) Brendan Lewis
(Italy) Alexander Wiest

Wang Z. (Shen, Zhu) – 06:16	1–0
Wang Z. (Shen, Lyu) – 08:44	2–0
Qiu (Wang Z., Zhu) (PP) – 12:42	3–0
Tian (Wang J.) – 12:54	4–0
Tian (Li, Lyu) – 14:32	5–0
Qiu (Shen, Wang Z.) – 20:34	6–0
Qiu (PP) – 28:34	7–0
Chen (Lyu, Wang J.) – 29:39	8–0
Tian (Song) – 32:56	9–0
Liu (Shen, Zhu) – 33:30	10–0
Liu (Zhu, Li) – 34:46	11–0
Li (Song, Lyu) – 35:40	12–0

6 min
Penalties
6 min
36
Shots
5

9 March 2026; 10:05	China	11–1 (1–1, 6–0, 4–0)	Italy	PalaItalia, Milan; Attendance: 4,500

Game reference

Wang Wei
Goalies
Santino Stillitano
Julian Kasslatter
Referee:
(United States) Bobby Esposito
Linesmen:
(Czech Republic) Pavel Blažek
(Finland) Lari Niittylä

Tian (Lyu, Song) – 12:22	1–0
	1–1	13:07 – Landeros (Kalegaris, Kafmann)
Qiu (Shen, Zhu) – 19:09	2–1
Wang Z. (Li) – 19:55	3–1
Tian (Shen) – 21:01	4–1
Tian (Shen) – 23:10	5–1
Wang Z. (Lyu, Song) – 24:08	6–1
Shen (Tian) – 26:02	7–1
Wang J. (Wang Z.) (PP) – 31:46	8–1
Song (Che) – 33:15	9–1
Wang Z. (Shen, Tian) – 34:47	10–1
Li (Shen, Song) (PP) – 44:27	11–1

4 min
Penalties
6 min
39
Shots
8

10 March 2026; 13:35	United States	7–1 (2–0, 4–0, 1–1)	China	PalaItalia, Milan; Attendance: 2,660

Game reference

Jen Lee
Goalies
Ji Yanzhao
Wang Wei
Referee:
(Canada) Kevin Webinger
Linesmen:
(Canada) Dylan Dauphinee
(United States) Brendan Lewis

Pauls (Roybal, Wallace) (PP) – 11:46	1–0
Farmer (Roybal) (PP) – 14:38	2–0
Roybal (Nichols) (PP) – 17:22	3–0
Farmer (Wallace) – 20:24	4–0
Roybal (Farmer, Nichols) (PP) – 26:16	5–0
Cunningham (Grove, Farmer) (PP) – 28:38	6–0
Farmer – 30:59	7–0
	7–1	34:28 – Zhu (Tian, Wang Z.)

6 min
Penalties
18 min
31
Shots
9

Semifinal

13 March 2026; 19:05	Canada	4–2 (2–1, 0–1, 2–0)	China	PalaItalia, Milan; Attendance: 3,898

Game reference

Corbin Watson
Goalies
Wang Wei
Referee:
(Canada) Patrick Myers
Linesmen:
(Norway) Marius Hermansen Oswold
(Sweden) Tony Rundström

McGregor (Hickey, Cozzolino) (PP) – 06:05	1–0
McGregor (Hickey, Lelièvre) – 10:43	2–0
	2–1	14:36 – Zhang (Shen, Tian) (PP)
	2–2	15:55 – Tian (Wang Z., Shen) (PP)
Cozzolino (Lavin) – 38:53	3–2
Hickey (Jacobs-Webb, McGregor) – 40:48	4–2

8 min
Penalties
10 min
21
Shots
11

Bronze medal game

15 March 2026; 12:05	China	3–2 (2–2, 0–0, 1–0)	Czechia	PalaItalia, Milan; Attendance: 3,962

Game reference

Ji Yanzhao
Goalies
Patrik Sedláček
Referee:
(Canada) Patrick Myers
Linesmen:
(United States) Brendan Lewis
(Sweden) Andreas Lunden

	0–1	01:40 – Kubeš (Geier, Kapko)
	0–2	02:34 – Zelinka (Žižlavský, Doležal)
Tian (Shen) – 06:03	1–2
Wang Z. (Zhu, Zhang) – 08:05	2–2
Tian (Shen) – 30:18	3–2

8 min
Penalties
2 min
23
Shots
16

== Para snowboard ==
Banked slalom
Men

Athlete	Event	Run 1	Run 2	Best	Rank
Ji Lijia	Men's banked slalom, SB-UL	~~DSQ~~	57.10	57.10	4
Jiang Zihao	Men's banked slalom, SB-UL	57.03	~~1:15.82~~	57.03	3rd place, bronze medalist(s)
Liu Yiyang	Men's banked slalom, SB-LL1	~~1:09.65~~	1:03.50	1:03.50	8
Sun Qi	Men's banked slalom, SB-LL2	57.72	~~58.14~~	57.72	4
Wang Pengyao	Men's banked slalom, SB-UL	~~57.53~~	56.62	56.62	2nd place, silver medalist(s)
Wu Zhongwei	Men's banked slalom, SB-LL1	~~1:00.99~~	1:00.35	1:00.35	4
Yan Wendi	Men's banked slalom, SB-LL2	~~58.99~~	58.21	58.21	6

Women

Athlete	Event	Run 1	Run 2	Best	Rank
Geng Yanhong	Women's banked slalom, SB-LL2	~~1:06.42~~	1:04.98	1:04.98	5
Hu Nianjia	Women's banked slalom, SB-LL2	~~1:11.29~~	1:09.54	1:09.54	8
Li Tiantian	Women's banked slalom, SB-LL2	~~1:07.56~~	1:07.06	1:07.06	6

Snowboard cross

Men

Athlete	Event	Seeding		Pre-heats	Quarterfinal	Semifinal	Final	
Athlete	Event	Time	Rank	Position	Position	Position	Position	Rank
Ji Lijia	Men's snowboard cross, SB-UL	50.17	2	Bye	1 Q	1 Q	1	1st place, gold medalist(s)
Liu Yiyang	Men's snowboard cross, SB-LL1	55.64	8	—N/a	2 Q	4 SF	4	8
Sun Qi	Men's snowboard cross, SB-LL2	51.43	3	—N/a	2 Q	3 SF	3	7
Wang Pengyao	Men's snowboard cross, SB-UL	49.95	1	Bye	2 Q	2 Q	DSQ	4
Wu Zhongwei	Men's snowboard cross, SB-LL1	54.94	7	—N/a	1 Q	2 Q	1	1st place, gold medalist(s)
Yan Wendi	Men's snowboard cross, SB-LL2	53.35	12	—N/a	3	Did not advance		
Zhu Yonggang	Men's snowboard cross, SB-UL	52.06	4	Bye	1 Q	1 Q	2	2nd place, silver medalist(s)

Women

Athlete	Event	Seeding		Pre-heats	Semifinal	Final	
Athlete	Event	Time	Rank	Position	Position	Position	Rank
Geng Yanhong	Women's snowboard cross, SB-LL2	58.04	4	Bye	4 SF	1	5
Hu Nianjia	Women's snowboard cross, SB-LL2	1:09.00	9	1 Q	2 Q	RAL	4
Wang Xinyu	Women's snowboard cross, SB-LL2	58.06	5	2 Q	1 Q	3	3rd place, bronze medalist(s)

== Wheelchair curling ==
Summary

Team	Event	Group stage										Semifinal	Final / BM	
Team	Event	Opposition Score	Opposition Score	Opposition Score	Opposition Score	Opposition Score	Opposition Score	Opposition Score	Opposition Score	Opposition Score	Rank	Opposition Score	Opposition Score	Rank
Wang Haitao; Chen Jianxin; Zhang Mingliang; Li Nana; Zhang Qiang	Mixed team	USA; W 12–7	ITA; W 5–3	KOR; W 7–5	NOR; W 11–2	CAN; L 4–9	LAT; W 9–5	GBR; W 9–4	SWE; W 12–3	SVK; W 7–4	2 Q	SWE; W 7–6	CAN; L 3–4	2nd place, silver medalist(s)
Wang Meng; Yang Jinqiao	Mixed doubles	JPN; W 10–3	LAT; W 10–2	ITA; W 8–7	KOR; W 10–6	EST; W 12–2	GBR; W 10–5	USA; L 6–7	—N/a		1 Q	LAT; W 8–3	KOR; W 9–7	1st place, gold medalist(s)

=== Mixed tournament ===
Final Round Robin Standings
Team	Skip	Pld	W	L	W–L	PF	PA	EW	EL	BE	SE	S%	DSC	Qualification
Canada	Mark Ideson	9	9	0	–	71	36	36	26	2	19	68.2%	84.488	Playoffs
China	Wang Haitao	9	8	1	–	76	42	38	26	1	15	68.3%	83.350	Playoffs
Sweden	Viljo Petersson-Dahl	9	5	4	1–0	47	48	31	31	6	13	62.8%	98.125	Playoffs
South Korea	Yang Hui-tae	9	5	4	0–1	55	48	36	32	1	17	64.6%	90.525	Playoffs
Norway	Jostein Stordahl	9	4	5	1–0	41	55	28	31	2	12	58.3%	130.863	
Italy	Egidio Marchese	9	4	5	0–1	52	53	32	27	0	15	60.6%	107.831	
Latvia	Ojārs Briedis	9	3	6	2–0	45	67	27	33	0	12	50.2%	113.381	
Slovakia	Radoslav Ďuriš	9	3	6	1–1	42	56	26	37	1	13	51.9%	117.688	
United States	Sean O'Neill	9	3	6	0–2	54	52	34	32	0	14	58.3%	72.156	
Great Britain	Hugh Nibloe	9	1	8	–	40	66	26	39	0	7	55.7%	129.675	

Source: Official website

Round robin
China had a bye in draws 2, 5 and 10.

Draw 1
Saturday, March 7, 9:35

Sheet C	1	2	3	4	5	6	7	8	Final
United States (O'Neill) 🔨	2	0	3	0	0	2	0	0	7
China (Wang)	0	4	0	4	1	0	1	2	12

Draw 3
Sunday, March 8, 9:35

Sheet B	1	2	3	4	5	6	7	8	Final
Italy (Marchese)	0	1	0	0	0	0	2	X	3
China (Wang) 🔨	1	0	1	1	1	1	0	X	5

Draw 4
Sunday, March 8, 18:35

Sheet D	1	2	3	4	5	6	7	8	Final
China (Wang)	1	0	2	0	2	0	1	1	7
South Korea (Yang) 🔨	0	1	0	2	0	2	0	0	5

Draw 6
Monday, March 9, 18:35

Sheet A	1	2	3	4	5	6	7	8	Final
Norway (Stordahl) 🔨	0	0	0	1	0	1	0	X	2
China (Wang)	1	1	2	0	2	0	5	X	11

Draw 7
Tuesday, March 10, 9:35

Sheet C	1	2	3	4	5	6	7	8	Final
China (Wang)	0	0	0	3	0	1	0	X	4
Canada (Ideson) 🔨	2	0	1	0	2	0	4	X	9

Draw 8
Tuesday, March 10, 18:35

Sheet B	1	2	3	4	5	6	7	8	Final
Latvia (Briedis)	0	0	1	0	1	0	3	X	5
China (Wang) 🔨	1	2	0	3	0	3	0	X	9

Draw 9
Wednesday, March 11, 9:05

Sheet D	1	2	3	4	5	6	7	8	Final
Great Britain (Nibloe)	0	2	1	0	1	0	0	X	4
China (Wang) 🔨	3	0	0	1	0	2	3	X	9

Draw 11
Thursday, March 12, 13:35

Sheet B	1	2	3	4	5	6	7	8	Final
China (Wang)	0	4	0	6	1	0	1	X	12
Sweden (Petersson-Dahl) 🔨	1	0	1	0	0	1	0	X	3

Draw 12
Thursday, March 12, 18:35

Sheet A	1	2	3	4	5	6	7	8	Final
China (Wang)	1	0	2	0	0	3	1	X	7
Slovakia (Ďuriš) 🔨	0	1	0	2	1	0	0	X	4

Semifinal

Friday, March 13, 10:05

Sheet D	1	2	3	4	5	6	7	8	Final
China (Wang) 🔨	1	1	0	1	0	3	0	1	7
Sweden (Petersson-Dahl)	0	0	3	0	1	0	2	0	6

Final

Saturday, March 14, 15:05

Sheet C	1	2	3	4	5	6	7	8	Final
Canada (Ideson) 🔨	0	1	0	1	0	1	0	1	4
China (Wang)	0	0	1	0	1	0	1	0	3

=== Mixed doubles ===
Final Round Robin Standings
Team	Athletes	Pld	W	L	W–L	PF	PA	EW	EL	BE	SE	S%	DSC	Qualification
China	Wang Meng / Yang Jinqiao	7	6	1	–	66	32	32	21	0	14	64.9%	106.033	Playoffs
United States	Laura Dwyer / Steve Emt	7	4	3	1–1	43	43	25	27	0	9	53.4%	89.717	Playoffs
South Korea	Baek Hye-jin / Lee Yong-suk	7	4	3	1–1	58	26	30	19	0	17	59.9%	142.058	Playoffs
Latvia	Poļina Rožkova / Agris Lasmans	7	4	3	1–1	46	45	28	25	0	12	48.5%	150.675	Playoffs
Great Britain	Jo Butterfield / Jason Kean	7	3	4	1–0	47	56	25	29	0	8	51.5%	95.075	
Japan	Aki Ogawa / Yoji Nakajima	7	3	4	0–1	30	53	19	30	0	8	49.0%	88.067	
Estonia	Katlin Riidebach / Ain Villau	7	2	5	1–0	31	58	22	28	0	9	47.6%	98.233	
Italy	Orietta Bertò / Paolo Ioriatti	7	2	5	0–1	43	51	28	30	0	11	55.6%	73.700	

Source: Official website

Round robin

Draw 1
Wednesday, March 4, 19:05

Sheet B	1	2	3	4	5	6	7	8	Final
Japan (Ogawa / Nakajima) 🔨	1	1	0	1	0	0	0	X	3
China (Wang / Yang)	0	0	4	0	2	3	1	X	10

Draw 2
Thursday, March 5, 10:05

Sheet A	1	2	3	4	5	6	7	8	Final
China (Wang / Yang) 🔨	1	2	0	3	0	3	1	X	10
Latvia (Rožkova / Lasmans)	0	0	1	0	1	0	0	X	2

Draw 3
Thursday, March 5, 19:05

Sheet D	1	2	3	4	5	6	7	8	EE	Final
Italy (Bertò / Ioriatti) 🔨	3	0	0	1	2	0	1	0	0	7
China (Wang / Yang)	0	1	2	0	0	3	0	1	1	8

Draw 4
Friday, March 6, 9:05

Sheet C	1	2	3	4	5	6	7	8	Final
China (Wang / Yang) 🔨	1	0	2	1	0	2	0	4	10
South Korea (Baek / Lee)	0	1	0	0	3	0	2	0	6

Draw 5
Saturday, March 7, 14:35

Sheet B	1	2	3	4	5	6	7	8	Final
China (Wang / Yang) 🔨	2	0	1	3	3	0	3	X	12
Estonia (Riidebach / Villau)	0	1	0	0	0	1	0	X	2

Draw 6
Sunday, March 8, 14:35

Sheet A	1	2	3	4	5	6	7	8	Final
Great Britain (Butterfield / Kean) 🔨	3	0	2	0	0	0	0	X	5
China (Wang / Yang)	0	1	0	2	2	3	2	X	10

Draw 7
Monday, March 9, 14:35

Sheet C	1	2	3	4	5	6	7	8	Final
United States (Dwyer / Emt) 🔨	1	2	1	0	0	0	2	1	7
China (Wang / Yang)	0	0	0	4	1	1	0	0	6

Semifinal

Tuesday, March 10, 14:35

Sheet A	1	2	3	4	5	6	7	8	Final
China (Wang / Yang) 🔨	2	0	2	2	0	0	2	X	8
Latvia (Rožkova / Lasmans)	0	1	0	0	1	1	0	X	3

Final

Wednesday, March 11, 14:35

Sheet C	1	2	3	4	5	6	7	8	EE	Final
China (Wang / Yang) 🔨	3	0	2	0	0	2	0	0	2	9
South Korea (Baek / Lee)	0	1	0	1	1	0	3	1	0	7

== See also ==
- China at the Paralympics
- China at the 2026 Winter Olympics
