= Para biathlon at the 2026 Winter Paralympics – Women's individual =

Women's individual at the XIV Paralympic Winter Games
- Paralympic biathlon
- Venue: Tesero Cross-Country Skiing Stadium.
- Dates: 8 March

Women's individual (visually impaired) at the XIV Paralympic Winter Games
- Competitors: 13 from 5 nations

Medalists
1st place, gold medalist(s)		Wang Yue; Guide: Chen Guoming	China
2nd place, silver medalist(s)		Simona Bubeníčková; Guide: David Šrůtek	Slovakia
3rd place, bronze medalist(s)		Johanna Recktenwald; Guide: Emily Weiss	Germany

Women's individual (standing) at the XIV Paralympic Winter Games
- Competitors: 9 from 4 nations

Medalists
1st place, gold medalist(s)		Natalie Wilkie	Canada
2nd place, silver medalist(s)		Zhao Zhiqing	China
3rd place, bronze medalist(s)		Oleksandra Kononova	Ukraine

Women's individual (sitting) at the XIV Paralympic Winter Games
- Competitors: 12 from 7 nations

Medalists
1st place, gold medalist(s)		Kim Yun-ji	South Korea
2nd place, silver medalist(s)		Anja Wicker	Germany
3rd place, bronze medalist(s)		Kendall Gretsch	United States

The women's individual competition of the 2026 Winter Paralympics was held on 8 March 2026 at the Tesero Cross-Country Skiing Stadium.

== Medal table ==
* Host nation (Italy)

Rank	Nation	Gold	Silver	Bronze	Total
1	China (CHN)	1	1	0	2
2	Canada (CAN)	1	0	0	1
2	South Korea (KOR)	1	0	0	1
4	Germany (GER)	0	1	1	2
5	Slovakia (SVK)	0	1	0	1
6	Ukraine (UKR)	0	0	1	1
6	United States (USA)	0	0	1	1
Totals (7 entries)		3	3	3	9

== Visually impaired ==
In the biathlon visually impaired, the athlete with a visual impairement has a sighted guide. The two skiers are considered a team, and dual medals are awarded.

Rank	Bib	Name	Country	Class	Misses	Real time	Result	Difference
1st place, gold medalist(s)	113	Wang Yue; Guide: Chen Guoming	China	NS2	1	35:00.9	34:57.9	
2nd place, silver medalist(s)	109	Simona Bubeníčková; Guide: David Šrůtek	Czech Republic	NS1	1	40:36.3	36:43.9	+1:46.0
3rd place, bronze medalist(s)	111	Johanna Recktenwald; Guide: Emily Weiss	Germany	NS2	0	38:14.0	37:05.2	+2:07.3
4	108	Oleksanda Danylenko; Guide: Mykyta Stakhurskyi	Ukraine	NS1	0	43:46.1	38:31.0	+3:33.1
5	110	Leonie Walter; Guide: Christian Krasman	Germany	NS2	2	38:03.9	38:55.4	+3:57.5
6	107	Linn Kazmaier; Guide: Florian Baumann	Germany	NS3	1	40:36.2	41:36.2	+6:38.3
7	112	Carina Edlingerová; Guide: Alexandr Paťava	Czech Republic	NS2	6	37:38.6	42:30.8	+7:32.9
8	104	Ilona Varkovets; Guide: Daryna Kovalova	Ukraine	NS3	3	39:32.9	42:32.9	+7:35.0
9	105	Oksana Shyshkova; Guide: Artem Kazarian	Ukraine	NS3	4	38:57.3	42:57.3	+7:59.4
10	102	Yang Qianru; Guide: Wang Guanyu	China	NS3	3	40:35.6	43:35.6	+8:37.7
11	106	Cong Jihong; Guide: Liu Jiaxuan	China	NS3	6	38:18.8	44:18.8	+9:20.9
12	101	Romana Lobasheva; Guide: Anastasiia Shabaldina	Ukraine	NS3	4	40:31.9	44:31.9	+9:34.0
13	103	Taryn Dickens; Guide: Lynn Maree Cullen	Australia	NS3	3	56:39.9	59:39.9	+24:42.0

== Standing ==
Rank	Bib	Name	Country	Class	Misses	Real time	Result	Difference
1st place, gold medalist(s)	55	Natalie Wilkie	Canada	LW8	0	34:24.4	33:01.8	
2nd place, silver medalist(s)	58	Zhao Zhiqing	China	LW5/7	1	36:10.5	33:33.5	+31.7
3rd place, bronze medalist(s)	59	Oleksandra Kononova	Ukraine	LW8	1	33:59.5	33:37.9	+36.1
4	52	Liudmyla Liashenko	Ukraine	LW8	2	34:00.6	34:39.0	+1:37.2
5	53	Brittany Hudak	Canada	LW8	0	36:14.0	34:47.0	+1:45.2
6	54	Danielle Aravich	United States	LW8	1	35:12.0	34:47.5	+1:45.7
7	57	Iryna Bui	Ukraine	LW8	3	34:52.5	36:28.8	+3:27.0
8	56	Guo Yujie	China	LW8	3	35:41.5	37:15.8	+4:14.0
9	51	Bohdana Konashuk	Ukraine	LW8	4	36:25.5	38:58.1	+5:56.3

== Sitting ==
Rank	Bib	Name	Country	Class	Misses	Real time	Result	Difference
1st place, gold medalist(s)	11	Kim Yun-ji	South Korea	LW10.5	2	41:22.9	38:00.1	
2nd place, silver medalist(s)	9	Anja Wicker	Germany	LW10	1	43:16.4	38:12.9	+12.8
3rd place, bronze medalist(s)	10	Kendall Gretsch	United States	LW11.5	1	39:10.1	38:36.1	+36.0
4	8	Oksana Masters	United States	LW12	1	37:47.9	38:47.9	+47.8
5	6	Zhai Yuxin	China	LW12	1	40:13.9	41:13.9	+3:13.8
6	12	Wang Shiyu	China	LW12	2	40:08.5	42:08.5	+4:08.4
7	7	Shan Yilin	China	LW12	2	41:30.6	43:30.6	+5:30.5
8	5	Christina Picton	Canada	LW12	1	42:59.4	43:59.4	+5:59.3
9	2	Lauren Parker	Australia	LW10	5	50:25.1	48:21.6	+10.21.5
10	1	Erin Martin	United States	LW10	2	55:43.5	49:55.4	+11.55.3
11	3	Elena de Sena	Brazil	LW12	6	48:36.8	54:36.8	+16:36.7
	4	Andrea Eskau	Germany	LW11	DSQ			

== See also ==
- Biathlon at the 2026 Winter Olympics
