= Para cross-country skiing at the 2026 Winter Paralympics – Women's sprint classical =

Women's sprint at the XIV Paralympic Winter Games
- Paralympic cross-country skiing
- Venue: Tesero Cross-Country Skiing Stadium
- Dates: 10 March

Women's sprint (visually impaired) at the XIV Paralympic Winter Games
- Competitors: 13 from 10 nations

Medalists
1st place, gold medalist(s)		Anastasiia Bagiian; Guide: Sergei Siniakin	Russia
2nd place, silver medalist(s)		Linn Kazmaier; Guide: Florian Baumann	Germany
3rd place, bronze medalist(s)		Cong Jihong; Guide: Liu Jiaxuan	China

Women's sprint (standing) at the XIV Paralympic Winter Games
- Competitors: 17 from 10 nations

Medalists
1st place, gold medalist(s)		Vilde Nilsen	Norway
2nd place, silver medalist(s)		Sydney Peterson	United States
3rd place, bronze medalist(s)		Natalie Wilkie	Canada

Women's sprint (sitting) at the XIV Paralympic Winter Games
- Competitors: 19 from 11 nations

Medalists
1st place, gold medalist(s)		Oksana Masters	United States
2nd place, silver medalist(s)		Kim Yun-ji	South Korea
3rd place, bronze medalist(s)		Wang Shiyu	China

The women's sprint competition of the 2026 Winter Paralympics was held on 10 March 2026 at the Tesero Cross-Country Skiing Stadium.

== Medal table ==
Rank	Nation	Gold	Silver	Bronze	Total
1	United States (USA)	1	1	0	2
2	Norway (NOR)	1	0	0	1
2	Russia (RUS)	1	0	0	1
4	Germany (GER)	0	1	0	1
4	South Korea (KOR)	0	1	0	1
6	China (CHN)	0	0	2	2
7	Canada (CAN)	0	0	1	1
Totals (7 entries)		3	3	3	9

== Visually impaired ==
In the cross-country skiing visually impaired, the athlete with a visual impairment has a sighted guide. The two skiers are considered a team, and dual medals are awarded.

=== Qualification ===
Rank	Bib	Name	Country	Class	%	Real time	Delta	Result	Notes
1	201	Simona Bubeníčková; Guide: David Šrůtek	Czech Republic	NS1	88	3:14.88		2:51.49	Q
2	205	Anastasiia Bagiian; Guide: Sergei Siniakin	Russia	NS1	88	3:18.99	+4.12	2:55.11	Q
3	202	Linn Kazmaier; Guide: Florian Baumann	Germany	NS3	100	3:03.79	+12.30	3:03.79	Q
4	203	Leonie Walter; Guide: Christian Krasman	Germany	NS2	97	3:11.91	+15.12	3:06.15	Q
5	209	Cong Jihong; Guide: Liu Jiaxuan	China	NS3	100	3:08.10	+16.61	3:08.10	Q
6	207	Maddie Mullin; Guide: Brooke Ailey	Canada	NS3	100	3:11.08	+19.59	3:11.08	Q
7	208	Aneta Kobryń; Guide: Bartłomiej Puto	Poland	NS2	97	3:19.11	+22.32	3:13.14	Q
8	206	Oksana Shyshkova; Guide: Artem Kazarian	Ukraine	NS3	100	3:19.69	+28.20	3:19.69	Q
9	210	Romana Lobasheva; Guide: Anastasiia Shabaldina	Ukraine	NS3	100	3:23.96	+32.47	3:23.96	
10	212	Yang Qianru; Guide: Wang Guanyu	China	NS3	100	3:28.57	+37.08	3:28.57	
11	211	Kotoha Matsudo; Guide: Yuji Shimada	Japan	NS3	100	3:57.74	+1:06.25	3:57.74	
12	213	Anna Grachova; Guide: Yermek Ormantayev	Kazakhstan	NS3	100	4:20.67	+1:29.18	4:20.67	
13	214	Taryn Dickens; Guide: Lynn Maree Cullen	Australia	NS3	100	5:21.76	+2:30.27	5:21.76	
	204	Johanna Recktenwald; Guide: Emily Rose Weiss	Germany	NS2	97	Did not start			

=== Semifinals ===
Semifinal 1

Rank	Bib	Name	Country	Class	Start	Time	Deficit	Notes
1	4	Leonie Walter; Guide: Christian Krasman	Germany	NS2	0:18	3:21.2		Q
2	5	Cong Jihong; Guide: Liu Jiaxuan	China	NS3	0:23	3:29.2	+8.0	Q
3	1	Simona Bubeníčková; Guide: David Šrůtek	Czech Republic	NS1	0:00	3:31.8	+10.6	
4	8	Oksana Shyshkova; Guide: Artem Kazarian	Ukraine	NS3	0:23	3:37.7	+16.5	

Semifinal 2

Rank	Bib	Name	Country	Class	Start	Time	Deficit	Notes
1	2	Anastasiia Bagiian; Guide: Sergei Siniakin	Russia	NS1	0:00	3:24.0		Q
2	3	Linn Kazmaier; Guide: Florian Baumann	Germany	NS3	0:23	3:29.4	+5.4	Q
3	6	Maddie Mullin; Guide: Brooke Ailey	Canada	NS3	0:23	3:41.4	+17.4	
4	7	Aneta Kobryń; Guide: Bartłomiej Puto	Poland	NS2	0:18	3:42.6	+18.6	

=== Final ===
Rank	Bib	Name	Country	Class	Start	Time	Deficit
1st place, gold medalist(s)	2	Anastasiia Bagiian; Guide: Sergei Siniakin	Russia	NS1	0:00	3:16.1	
2nd place, silver medalist(s)	3	Linn Kazmaier; Guide: Florian Baumann	Germany	NS3	0:23	3:24.7	+8.6
3rd place, bronze medalist(s)	5	Cong Jihong; Guide: Liu Jiaxuan	China	NS3	0:23	3:30.2	+14.1
4	4	Leonie Walter; Guide: Christian Krasman	Germany	NS2	0:18	RAL	

== Standing ==
=== Qualification ===
Rank	Bib	Name	Country	Class	%	Real time	Delta	Result	Notes
1	103	Natalie Wilkie	Canada	LW8	92	3:08.13		2:53.08	Q
2	101	Vilde Nilsen	Norway	LW4	97	2:58.71	+0.28	2:53.35	Q
3	109	Kathrin Marchand	Germany	LW9	88	3:18.78	+2.10	2:54.93	Q
4	102	Sydney Peterson	United States	LW9	88	3:18.91	+2.23	2:55.04	Q
5	104	Liudmyla Liashenko	Ukraine	LW8	92	3:17.51	+9.38	3:01.71	Q
6	107	Danielle Aravich	United States	LW8	92	3:21.48	+13.35	3:05.36	Q
7	112	Yurika Abe	Japan	LW6	90	3:27.80	+15.49	3:07.02	Q
8	106	Oleksandra Kononova	Ukraine	LW8	92	3:24.96	+16.83	3:08.56	Q
9	105	Zhao Zhiqing	China	LW5/7	81	3:56.55	+22.87	3:11.61	Q
10	114	Guo Yujie	China	LW8	92	3:29.11	+20.98	3:12.38	Q
11	110	Emma Archibald	Canada	LW5/7	81	4:01.13	+27.45	3:15.32	Q
12	108	Iryna Bui	Ukraine	LW8	92	3:33.57	+25.44	3:16.48	Q
13	113	Alice Morelius	Sweden	LW8	92	3:37.38	+29.25	3:19.99	
14	116	Darya Fedzkovich	Belarus	LW4	97	3:27.73	+29.30	3:21.50	
15	111	Ellen Westerlund	Sweden	LW9	88	4:02.22	+45.54	3:33.15	
16	115	Mika Iwamoto	Japan	LW8	92	3:53.93	+45.80	3:35.22	
17	117	Tabea Dolžan	Slovenia	LW3	86	4:57.95	+1:36.69	4:16.24	

=== Semifinals ===
Semifinal 1

Rank	Bib	Name	Country	Class	Start	Time	Deficit	Notes
1	1	Natalie Wilkie	Canada	LW8	0:26	3:31.4		Q
2	4	Sydney Peterson	United States	LW9	0:17	3:37.4	+6.0	Q
3	9	Zhao Zhiqing	China	LW5/7	0:00	3:42.2	+10.8	Q
4	5	Liudmyla Liashenko	Ukraine	LW8	0:26	3:47.3	+15.9	
5	12	Iryna Bui	Ukraine	LW8	0:26	3:58.8	+27.4	
	8	Oleksandra Kononova	Ukraine	LW8	0:26	Did not start		

Semifinal 2

Rank	Bib	Name	Country	Class	Start	Time	Deficit	Notes
1	2	Vilde Nilsen	Norway	LW4	0:36	3:39.6		Q
2	3	Kathrin Marchand	Germany	LW9	0:17	3:44.2	+4.6	Q
3	6	Danielle Aravich	United States	LW8	0:26	3:49.4	+9.8	Q
4	11	Emma Archibald	Canada	LW5/7	0:00	3:53.0	+13.4	
5	7	Yurika Abe	Japan	LW6	0:22	3:59.1	+19.5	
6	10	Guo Yujie	China	LW8	0:26	4:04.5	+24.9	

=== Final ===
Rank	Bib	Name	Country	Class	Start	Time	Deficit
1st place, gold medalist(s)	2	Vilde Nilsen	Norway	LW4	0:36	3:31.3	
2nd place, silver medalist(s)	4	Sydney Peterson	United States	LW9	0:17	3:35.5	+4.2
3rd place, bronze medalist(s)	1	Natalie Wilkie	Canada	LW8	0:26	3:40.2	+8.9
4	3	Kathrin Marchand	Germany	LW9	0:17	3:42.1	+10.8
5	9	Zhao Zhiqing	China	LW5/7	0:00	3:43.4	+12.1
6	6	Danielle Aravich	United States	LW8	0:26	3:57.6	+26.3

== Sitting ==
=== Qualification ===
Rank	Bib	Name	Country	Class	%	Real time	Delta	Result	Notes
1	2	Oksana Masters	United States	LW12	100	2:29.32	–	2:29.32	Q
2	3	Kim Yun-ji	South Korea	LW10.5	87	2:58.38	+6.75	2:35.19	Q
3	4	Aline Rocha	Brazil	LW10.5	87	3:01.10	+9.47	2:37.56	Q
4	1	Anja Wicker	Germany	LW10	86	3:03.62	+9.99	2:37.91	Q
5	5	Wang Shiyu	China	LW12	100	2:42.71	+13.39	2:42.71	Q
6	13	Han Seung-hee	South Korea	LW10	86	3:11.56	+17.93	2:44.74	Q
7	7	Andrea Eskau	Germany	LW11	93	2:57.92	+17.36	2:45.47	Q
8	10	Valiantsina Biryla	Belarus	LW10.5	87	3:11.61	+19.98	2:46.70	Q
9	14	Lidziya Loban	Belarus	LW12	100	2:49.03	+19.71	2:46.70	Q
10	12	Nicole Zaino	United States	LW11.5	96	2:56.29	+20.75	2:49.24	Q
11	8	Christina Picton	Canada	LW12	100	2:50.10	+20.78	2:50.10	Q
12	9	Indira Liseth	Norway	LW10.5	87	3:16.27	+24.64	2:50.75	Q
13	17	Lauren Parker	Australia	LW10	86	3:22.07	+28.44	2:53.78	
14	16	Erin Martin	United States	LW10	86	3:24.22	+30.59	2:55.63	
15	6	Merle Menje	Germany	LW11	93	3:09.06	+28.50	2:55.83	
16	11	Elena de Sena	Brazil	LW12	100	2:57.52	+28.20	2:57.52	
17	15	Lyne-Marie Bilodeau	Canada	LW12	100	3:09.70	+40.38	3:09.70	
18	18	Nana Sato	Japan	LW10.5	87	3:39.49	+47.86	3:10.96	
19	19	Arna Sigríður Albertsdóttir	Iceland	LW10	86	4:14.63	+1:21.00	3:38.98	

=== Semifinals ===
Semifinal 1

Rank	Bib	Name	Country	Class	Start	Time	Deficit	Notes
1	1	Oksana Masters	United States	LW12	0:24	3:06.8		Q
2	4	Anja Wicker	Germany	LW10	0:00	3:12.5	+5.7	Q
3	5	Wang Shiyu	China	LW12	0:24	3:17.3	+10.5	Q
4	9	Lidziya Loban	Belarus	LW12	0:24	3:22.5	+15.7	
5	12	Indira Liseth	Norway	LW10.5	0:02	3:26.3	+19.5	
6	8	Valiantsina Biryla	Belarus	LW10.5	0:02	3:29.3	+22.5	

Semifinal 2

Rank	Bib	Name	Country	Class	Start	Time	Deficit	Notes
1	2	Kim Yun-ji	South Korea	LW10.5	0:02	3:01.1		Q
2	3	Aline Rocha	Brazil	LW10.5	0:02	3:05.0	+3.9	Q
3	7	Andrea Eskau	Germany	LW11	0:13	3:15.4	+14.3	Q
4	11	Christina Picton	Canada	LW11.5	0:24	3:20.9	+19.8	
5	10	Nicole Zaino	United States	LW12	0:18	3:20.9	+19.8	
6	6	Han Seung-hee	South Korea	LW10	0:00	3:26.1	+25.0	

=== Final ===
Rank	Bib	Name	Country	Class	Start	Time	Deficit
1st place, gold medalist(s)	1	Oksana Masters	United States	LW12	0:24	3:07.1	
2nd place, silver medalist(s)	2	Kim Yun-ji	South Korea	LW10.5	0:02	3:10.1	+3.0
3rd place, bronze medalist(s)	5	Wang Shiyu	China	LW12	0:24	3:17.9	+10.8
4	7	Andrea Eskau	Germany	LW11	0:13	3:19.8	+12.7
5	3	Aline Rocha	Brazil	LW10.5	0:02	3:21.0	+13.9
6	4	Anja Wicker	Germany	LW10	0:00	3:24.7	+17.6

== See also ==
- Cross-country skiing at the 2026 Winter Olympics
