= Biathlon at the 2022 Winter Paralympics – Women's 6 kilometres =

Women's 6 kilometres at the XIII Paralympic Winter Games
- Paralympic biathlon
- Dates: 5 March

Women's 6 kilometres (visually impaired) at the XIII Paralympic Winter Games
- Competitors: 9 from 5 nations

Medalists
1st place, gold medalist(s)		Oksana Shyshkova; Guide: Andriy Marchenko	Ukraine
2nd place, silver medalist(s)		Linn Kazmaier; Guide: Florian Baumann	Germany
3rd place, bronze medalist(s)		Leonie Maria Walter; Guide: Pirmin Strecker	Germany

Women's 6 kilometres (standing) at the XIII Paralympic Winter Games
- Competitors: 16 from 6 nations

Medalists
1st place, gold medalist(s)		Guo Yujie	China
2nd place, silver medalist(s)		Liudmyla Liashenko	Ukraine
3rd place, bronze medalist(s)		Zhao Zhiqing	China

Women's 6 kilometres (sitting) at the XIII Paralympic Winter Games
- Competitors: 11 from 6 nations

Medalists
1st place, gold medalist(s)		Oksana Masters	United States
2nd place, silver medalist(s)		Shan Yilin	China
3rd place, bronze medalist(s)		Kendall Gretsch	United States

The Women's 6 kilometres competition of the 2022 Winter Paralympics took place on 5 March 2022.

== Medal table ==
Rank	Nation	Gold	Silver	Bronze	Total
1	China (CHN)	1	1	1	3
2	Ukraine (UKR)	1	1	0	2
3	United States (USA)	1	0	1	2
4	Germany (GER)	0	1	1	2
Totals (4 entries)		3	3	3	9

== Visually impaired ==
In the biathlon visually impaired, the athlete with a visual impairment has a sighted guide. The two skiers are considered a team, and dual medals are awarded.

Rank	Bib	Name	Country	Misses	Real time	Calculated Time	Difference
1st place, gold medalist(s)	99	Oksana Shyshkova; Guide: Andriy Marchenko	Ukraine	0	20:21.2	20:09.0	-
2nd place, silver medalist(s)	96	Linn Kazmaier; Guide: Florian Baumann	Germany	1	20:14.6	20:14.6	+5.6
3rd place, bronze medalist(s)	98	Leonie Maria Walter; Guide: Pirmin Strecker	Germany	1	20:51.5	20:39.0	+30.3
4	95	Wang Yue; Guide: Li Yalin	China	1	23:03.5	22:49.7	+2:42.3
5	92	Yang Qianru; Guide: Yu Hongshun	China	1	23:11.7	22:57.8	+2:50.5
6	93	Nataliia Tkachenko; Guide: Denys Nikulin	Ukraine	2	23:45.0	23:30.8	+3:23.8
7	97	Johanna Recktenwald; Guide: Valentin Haag	Germany	2	24:50.5	24:35.6	+4:29.3
8	91	Aneta Gorska; Guide: Catherine Spierenburg	Poland	7	34:04.7	33:44.3	+13:43.5
	94	Carina Edlinger; Guide: Lorenz Joseph Lampl	Austria	4	DNF		

== Standing ==
Rank	Bib	Name	Country	Misses	Real time	Calculated Time	Difference
1st place, gold medalist(s)	57	Guo Yujie	China	1	20:32.6	19:43.3	-
2nd place, silver medalist(s)	66	Liudmyla Liashenko	Ukraine	2	20:41.4	19:51.7	+8.8
3rd place, bronze medalist(s)	56	Zhao Zhiqing	China	1	22:19.0	20:05.1	+24.2
4	64	Yuliia Batenkova-Bauman	Ukraine	1	21:28.6	20:24.2	+43.0
5	59	Iweta Faron	Poland	0	21:17.3	20:26.2	+44.7
6	65	Iryna Buri	Ukraine	3	21:17.9	20:26.8	+45.3
7	60	Emily Young	Canada	0	21:35.8	20:31.0	+50.2
8	61	Brittany Hudak	Canada	1	21:23.7	20:32.4	+51.1
9	51	Li Huiling	China	1	21:46.5	20:54.2	+1:13.9
10	58	Bohdana Konashuk	Ukraine	1	22:07.4	21:14.3	+1:34.8
11	62	Oleksandra Kononova	Ukraine	4	22:43.2	21:48.7	+2:10.6
12	53	Wang Ruo	China	0	23:06.2	22:10.8	+2:33.6
13	55	Dani Aravich	United States	3	23:12.6	22:16.9	+2:40.0
14	54	Momoko Dekijima	Japan	2	23:46.8	22:35.5	+3:01.2
15	63	Natalie Wilkie	Canada	7	24:12.2	23:14.1	+3:39.6
16	52	Yurika Abe	Japan	7	27:35.9	26:13.1	+6:50.3

== Sitting ==
Rank	Bib	Name	Country	Misses	Real time	Calculated Time	Difference
1st place, gold medalist(s)	10	Oksana Masters	United States	0	20:51.2	20:51.2	-
2nd place, silver medalist(s)	8	Shan Yilin	China	0	21:06.3	21:06.3	+15.1
3rd place, bronze medalist(s)	11	Kendall Gretsch	United States	1	22:47.6	21:52.9	+1:04.3
4	5	Wang Shiyu	China	0	22:22.1	22:22.1	+1:30.9
5	9	Anja Wicker	Germany	3	26:46.3	23:17.5	+2:48.1
6	7	Zhai Yuxin	China	1	23:48.6	23:48.6	+2:57.4
7	6	Christina Picton	Canada	0	23:50.7	23:50.7	+2:59.5
8	1	Chu Beibei	China	3	25:02.2	25:02.2	+4:11.0
9	3	Lera Doederlein	United States	2	27:26.9	27:26.9	+6:35.7
10	4	Anastasiia Laletina	Ukraine	5	33:06.2	28:48.0	+9:08.0
11	2	Monika Kukla	Poland	6	29:15.2	29:15.2	+8:24.0

== See also ==
- Biathlon at the 2022 Winter Olympics
