= Biathlon at the 2022 Winter Paralympics – Women's 10 kilometres =

Women's 10 kilometres at the XIII Paralympic Winter Games
- Paralympic biathlon
- Dates: 8 March
- Competitors: 6 from 3 nations

Women's 10 kilometres (visually impaired) at the XIII Paralympic Winter Games

Medalists
1st place, gold medalist(s)		Leonie Maria Walter; Guide: Pirmin Strecker	Germany
2nd place, silver medalist(s)		Oksana Shyshkova; Guide: Andriy Marchenko	Ukraine
3rd place, bronze medalist(s)		Wang Yue; Guide: Li Yalin	China

Women's 10 kilometres (standing) at the XIII Paralympic Winter Games
- Competitors: 13 from 6 nations

Medalists
1st place, gold medalist(s)		Iryna Bui	Ukraine
2nd place, silver medalist(s)		Oleksandra Kononova	Ukraine
3rd place, bronze medalist(s)		Liudmyla Liashenko	Ukraine

Women's 10 kilometres (sitting) at the XIII Paralympic Winter Games
- Competitors: 11 from 6 nations

Medalists
1st place, gold medalist(s)		Kendall Gretsch	United States
2nd place, silver medalist(s)		Oksana Masters	United States
3rd place, bronze medalist(s)		Anja Wicker	Germany

The Women's 10 kilometres competition of the 2022 Winter Paralympics took place on 8 March 2022.

== Medal table ==
Rank	Nation	Gold	Silver	Bronze	Total
1	Ukraine (UKR)	1	2	1	4
2	United States (USA)	1	1	0	2
3	Germany (GER)	1	0	1	2
4	China (CHN)*	0	0	1	1
Totals (4 entries)		3	3	3	9

== Visually impaired ==
In the biathlon visually impaired, the athlete with a visual impairment has a sighted guide. The two skiers are considered a team, and dual medals are awarded.

Rank	Bib	Name	Country	Penalties	Time	Difference
1st place, gold medalist(s)	85	Leonie Maria Walter; Guide: Pirmin Strecker	Germany	0	40:56.2	–
2nd place, silver medalist(s)	86	Oksana Shyshkova; Guide: Andriy Marchenko	Ukraine	2	40:59.9	+3.7
3rd place, bronze medalist(s)	83	Wang Yue; Guide: Li Yalin	China	4	42:50.3	+1:54.1
4	84	Johanna Recktenwald; Guide: Valentin Haag	Germany	3	45:56.6	+5:00.4
5	81	Yang Qianru; Guide: Yu Hongshun	China	4	48:36.6	+7:40.4
6	82	Nataliia Tkachenko; Guide: Denys Nikulin	Ukraine	5	49:03.4	+8:07.2

== Standing ==
Rank	Bib	Name	Country	Penalties	Time	Difference
1st place, gold medalist(s)	52	Iryna Bui	Ukraine	0	36:43.1	–
2nd place, silver medalist(s)	50	Oleksandra Kononova	Ukraine	2	36:55.9	+12.8
3rd place, bronze medalist(s)	53	Liudmyla Liashenko	Ukraine	2	36:56.9	+13.8
4	45	Guo Yujie	China	3	37:18.3	+35.2
5	51	Yuliia Batenkova-Bauman	Ukraine	2	37:29.9	+46.8
6	49	Brittany Hudak	Canada	2	37:43.1	+1:00.0
7	46	Bohdana Konashuk	Ukraine	3	39:08.9	+2:25.8
8	48	Emily Young	Canada	2	39:27.8	+2:44.7
9	41	Li Huiling	China	2	39:53.5	+3:10.4
10	43	Momoko Dekijima	Japan	3	41:59.1	+5:16.0
11	44	Dani Aravich	United States	8	42:50.4	+6:07.3
12	42	Wang Ruo	China	5	43:40.2	+6:57.1
	47	Iweta Faron	Poland	DNS		

== Sitting ==
Rank	Bib	Name	Country	Penalties	Time	Difference
1st place, gold medalist(s)	11	Kendall Gretsch	United States	1	33:12.3	–
2nd place, silver medalist(s)	10	Oksana Masters	United States	0	33:21.0	+8.7
3rd place, bronze medalist(s)	9	Anja Wicker	Germany	5	35:45.3	+2:33.0
4	8	Shan Yilin	China	2	37:17.8	+4:05.5
5	7	Zhai Yuxin	China	2	37:20.3	+4:08.0
6	5	Wang Shiyu	China	3	37:37.4	+4:25.1
7	1	Chu Beibei	China	0	38:15.4	+5:03.1
8	6	Christina Picton	Canada	3	39:15.9	+6:03.6
9	3	Lera Doederlein	United States	2	43:52.3	+10:40.0
10	2	Monika Kukla	Poland	7	44:41.7	+11:29.4
	4	Anastasiia Laletina	Ukraine	DNS		

Anastasiia Laletina did not compete in the middle-distance race after her father was captured by Russian forces during the Russian invasion of Ukraine.

== See also ==
- Biathlon at the 2022 Winter Olympics
