= Biathlon at the 2022 Winter Paralympics – Women's 12.5 kilometres =

Women's 12.5 kilometres at the XIII Paralympic Winter Games
- Paralympic biathlon
- Dates: 11 March

Women's 12.5 kilometres (visually impaired) at the XIII Paralympic Winter Games

Medalists
1st place, gold medalist(s)		Oksana Shyshkova; Guide: Andriy Marchenko	Ukraine
2nd place, silver medalist(s)		Linn Kazmaier; Guide: Florian Baumann	Germany
3rd place, bronze medalist(s)		Leonie Maria Walter; Guide: Pirmin Strecker	Germany

Women's 12.5 kilometres (standing) at the XIII Paralympic Winter Games
- Competitors: 14 from 5 nations

Medalists
1st place, gold medalist(s)		Liudmyla Liashenko	Ukraine
2nd place, silver medalist(s)		Zhao Zhiqing	China
3rd place, bronze medalist(s)		Brittany Hudak	Canada

Women's 12.5 kilometres (sitting) at the XIII Paralympic Winter Games
- Competitors: 10 from 6 nations

Medalists
1st place, gold medalist(s)		Oksana Masters	United States
2nd place, silver medalist(s)		Kendall Gretsch	United States
3rd place, bronze medalist(s)		Yilin Shan	China

The Women's 12.5 kilometres competition of the 2022 Winter Paralympics took place on 11 March 2022.

== Medal table ==
Rank	Nation	Gold	Silver	Bronze	Total
1	Ukraine (UKR)	2	0	0	2
2	United States (USA)	1	1	0	2
3	China (CHN)*	0	1	1	2
3	Germany (GER)	0	1	1	2
5	Canada (CAN)	0	0	1	1
Totals (5 entries)		3	3	3	9

== Visually impaired ==
In the biathlon visually impaired, the athlete with a visual impairment has a sighted guide. The two skiers are considered a team, and dual medals are awarded.

Rank	Bib	Name	Country	Penalties	Real Time	Calculated Time	Difference
1st place, gold medalist(s)	97	Oksana Shyshkova; Guide: Andriy Marchenko	Ukraine	0	50:50.1	50:19.6	–
2nd place, silver medalist(s)	94	Linn Kazmaier; Guide: Florian Baumann	Germany	0	50:23.2	50:23.2	+3.6
3rd place, bronze medalist(s)	96	Leonie Maria Walter; Guide: Pirmin Strecker	Germany	0	52:59.4	52:27.6	+2:08.0
4	95	Johanna Rectenwald; Guide: Valentin Haag	Germany	4	53:32.9	57:00.8	+6:41.2
5	91	Yang Qianru; Guide: Yu Hongshun	China	2	58:45.4	1:00:10.1	+9:50.5
6	92	Nataliia Tkachenko; Guide: Denys Nikulin	Ukraine	3	59:44.0	1:02:08.2	+11:48.6
	93	Carina Edlinger; Guide: Lorenz Joseph Lampl	Austria	3	DNF		

== Standing ==
Rank	Bib	Name	Country	Penalties	Real Time	Calculated Time	Difference
1st place, gold medalist(s)	64	Liudmyla Liashenko	Ukraine	2	47:15.4	47:22.0	–
2nd place, silver medalist(s)	55	Zhao Zhiqing	China	1	52:20.3	48:06.3	+44.3
3rd place, bronze medalist(s)	60	Brittany Hudak	Canada	2	49:01.0	49:03.4	+1:41.4
4	63	Iryna Bui	Ukraine	1	50:13.4	49:12.9	+1:50.9
5	62	Yuliia Batenkova-Bauman	Ukraine	0	52:22.3	49:45.2	+2:23.2
6	59	Emily Young	Canada	1	51:29.8	49:55.3	+2:33.3
7	56	Guo Yujie	China	2	50:04.6	50:04.4	+2:42.4
8	51	Li Huiling	China	3	53:18.5	54:10.6	+6:48.6
9	61	Oleksandra Kononova	Ukraine	6	50:24.5	54:23.5	+7:01.5
10	57	Bohdana Konashuk	Ukraine	5	51:58.3	54:53.6	+7:31.6
11	53	Wang Ruo	China	1	56:21.1	55:05.9	+7:43.9
12	54	Momoko Dekijima	Japan	4	55:14.9	56:29.2	+9:07.2
13	52	Yurika Abe	Japan	8	58:29.8	1:03:34.3	+16:12.3
	58	Iweta Faron	Poland	3	DNF		

== Sitting ==
Rank	Bib	Name	Country	Penalties	Real Time	Calculated Time	Difference
1st place, gold medalist(s)	9	Oksana Masters	United States	1	41:17.9	42:17.9	–
2nd place, silver medalist(s)	10	Kendall Gretsch	United States	0	44:09.7	42:23.7	+5.8
3rd place, bronze medalist(s)	7	Shan Yilin	China	0	42:36.6	42:36.6	+18.7
4	8	Anja Wicker	Germany	0	51:24.3	44:43.3	+2:25.4
5	1	Chu Beibei	China	1	45:59.1	46:59.1	+4:41.2
6	6	Zhai Yuxin	China	1	46:43.2	47:43.2	+5:25.3
7	5	Christina Picton	Canada	0	47:51.9	47:51.9	+5:34.0
8	4	Wang Shiyu	China	1	47:15.7	48:15.7	+5:57.8
9	3	Anastasiia Laletina	Ukraine	2	59:22.5	53:39.4	+11:21.5
10	2	Monika Kukla	Poland	7	51:32.3	58:32.3	+16:14.4

== See also ==
- Biathlon at the 2022 Winter Olympics
