= FIS Nordic World Ski Championships 2025 – Women's para cross-country sprint =

Women's para cross-country sprint at the FIS Nordic World Ski Championships 2025
- Venue: Granåsen Ski Centre
- Location: Trondheim, Norway
- Dates: 4 March (qualification); 5 March

Women's sprint (visually impaired) at the FIS Nordic World Ski Championships 2025
- Competitors: 10 from 6 nations

Medalists
gold medal	Carina Edlinger; Guide: Jakob Kainz	Austria
silver medal	Simona Bubeníčková; Guide: David Šrůtek	Czech Republic
bronze medal	Leonie Walter; Guide: Christian Krasmann	Germany

Women's sprint (standing) at the FIS Nordic World Ski Championships 2025
- Competitors: 13 from 7 nations

Medalists
gold medal	Vilde Nilsen	Norway
silver medal	Natalie Wilkie	Canada
bronze medal	Sydney Peterson	United States

Women's sprint (sitting) at the FIS Nordic World Ski Championships 2025
- Competitors: 6 from 4 nations

Medalists
gold medal	Kim Yun-ji	South Korea
silver medal	Kendall Gretsch	United States
bronze medal	Anja Wicker	Germany

The Women's para cross-country sprint competition at the FIS Nordic World Ski Championships 2025 will be held on 4 and 5 March 2025.

== Visually impaired ==
=== Qualification ===
Rank	Bib	Name	Country	Time	Difference	Notes
1	83	Carina Edlinger; Guide: Jakob Kainz	Austria	3:51.43		
2	81	Simona Bubeníčková; Guide: David Šrůtek	Czech Republic	4:00.33	+8.90	Q
3	82	Linn Kazmaier; Guide: Florian Baumann	Germany	4:20.96	+29.53	Q
4	84	Leonie Walter; Guide: Christian Krasmann	Germany	4:21.74	+30.31	Q
5	85	Johanna Recktenwald; Guide: Robin Wunderle	Germany	4:21.80	+30.37	Q
6	87	Oksana Shyshkova; Guide: Artem Kazarian	Ukraine	4:27.81	+36.38	Q
7	86	Nataliia Tkachenko; Guide: Ivan Marchyshak	Ukraine	4:51.27	+59.84	Q
8	88	Aneta Kobryń; Guide: Bartłomiej Puto	Poland	4:52.50	+1:01.17	Q
9	90	Anna Grachova; Guide: Yermek Ormantayev	Kazakhstan	5:42.49	+1:51.06	
10	89	Romana Lobasheva; Guide: Anastasiia Shabaldina	Ukraine	5:47.55	+1:56.12	

=== Semifinals ===
==== Semifinal 1 ====
Rank	Seed	Athlete	Country	Time	Deficit	Notes
1	1	Carina Edlinger; Guide: Jakob Kainz	Austria	3:38.82		Q
2	4	Leonie Walter; Guide: Christian Krasmann	Germany	3:40.80	+1.98	Q
3	5	Johanna Recktenwald; Guide: Robin Wunderle	Germany	3:53.33	+14.51	
4	8	Aneta Kobryń; Guide: Bartłomiej Puto	Poland	4:10.85	+32.03	

==== Semifinal 2 ====
Rank	Seed	Athlete	Country	Time	Deficit	Notes
1	2	Simona Bubeníčková; Guide: David Šrůtek	Czech Republic	3:59.06		Q
2	3	Linn Kazmaier; Guide: Florian Baumann	Germany	4:17.35	+18.29	Q
3	6	Oksana Shyshkova; Guide: Artem Kazarian	Ukraine	4:29.35	+30.29	
4	7	Nataliia Tkachenko; Guide: Ivan Marchyshak	Ukraine	4:42.93	+43.87	

=== Final ===
Rank	Seed	Athlete	Country	Time	Deficit
1st place, gold medalist(s)	1	Carina Edlinger; Guide: Jakob Kainz	Austria	3:58.16	
2nd place, silver medalist(s)	2	Simona Bubeníčková; Guide: David Šrůtek	Czech Republic	4:02.09	+3.93
3rd place, bronze medalist(s)	4	Leonie Walter; Guide: Christian Krasmann	Germany	4:10.52	+12.36
4	3	Linn Kazmaier; Guide: Florian Baumann	Germany	4:15.45	+17.29

== Standing ==
=== Qualification ===
Rank	Bib	Name	Country	Time	Difference	Notes
1	42	Natalie Wilkie	Canada	3:47.17		Q
2	41	Vilde Nilsen	Norway	3:56.54	+9.37	Q
3	44	Oleksandra Kononova	Ukraine	4:04.72	+17.55	Q
4	49	Yurika Abe	Japan	4:11.76	+24.59	Q
5	51	Kathrin Marchand	Germany	4:22.35	+35.18	Q
6	48	Bohdana Konashuk	Ukraine	4:28.26	+41.09	Q
7	47	Iryna Bui	Ukraine	4:31.54	+44.37	Q
8	43	Liudmyla Liashenko	Ukraine	4:38.63	+51.46	Q
9	52	Alice Morelius	Sweden	4:38.95	+51.78	Q
10	50	Ellen Westerlund	Sweden	4:41.55	+54.38	Q
11	45	Sydney Peterson	United States	4:48.09	+1:00.92	Q
12	46	Danielle Aravich	United States	5:04.11	+1:16.94	Q
13	53	Louise Perottosdotter	Sweden	5:05.07	+1:17.90	

=== Semifinals ===
==== Semifinal 1 ====
Rank	Seed	Athlete	Country	Time	Deficit	Notes
1	1	Natalie Wilkie	Canada	3:49.64		Q
2	12	Danielle Aravich	United States	4:09.03	+19.39	Q
3	4	Yurika Abe	Japan	4:09.18	+19.54	Q
4	8	Liudmyla Liashenko	Ukraine	4:13.04	+23.40	
5	5	Kathrin Marchand	Germany	4:22.55	+32.91	
6	9	Alice Morelius	Sweden	4:26.62	+36.98	

==== Semifinal 2 ====
Rank	Seed	Athlete	Country	Time	Deficit	Notes
1	2	Vilde Nilsen	Norway	3:54.96		Q
2	11	Sydney Peterson	United States	4:05.99	+11.03	Q
3	10	Ellen Westerlund	Sweden	4:09.69	+14.73	Q
4	3	Oleksandra Kononova	Ukraine	4:17.74	+22.78	
5	7	Iryna Bui	Ukraine	4:19.66	+24.70	
	6	Bohdana Konashuk	Ukraine	Did not start		

=== Final ===
Rank	Seed	Athlete	Country	Time	Deficit
1st place, gold medalist(s)	2	Vilde Nilsen	Norway	3:52.92	
2nd place, silver medalist(s)	1	Natalie Wilkie	Canada	3:53.13	+0.21
3rd place, bronze medalist(s)	11	Sydney Peterson	United States	4:07.39	+14.47
4	4	Yurika Abe	Japan	4:29.37	+36.45
5	10	Ellen Westerlund	Sweden	4:32.08	+39.16
6	12	Danielle Aravich	United States	4:41.22	+48.30

== Sitting ==
=== Qualification ===
Rank	Bib	Name	Country	Time	Difference	Notes
1	2	Kendall Gretsch	United States	3:02.94		Q
2	1	Anja Wicker	Germany	3:07.81	+4.87	Q
3	3	Kim Yun-ji	South Korea	3:11.79	+8.85	Q
4	4	Merle Menje	Germany	3:23.27	+20.33	Q
5	6	Han Seung-hee	South Korea	3:47.01	+44.07	Q
6	5	Indira Liseth	Norway	4:22.06	+1:19.12	Q

=== Final ===
Rank	Seed	Athlete	Country	Time	Deficit
1st place, gold medalist(s)	3	Kim Yun-ji	South Korea	3:04.35	
2nd place, silver medalist(s)	1	Kendall Gretsch	United States	3:07.34	+2.99
3rd place, bronze medalist(s)	2	Anja Wicker	Germany	3:09.75	+5.40
4	4	Merle Menje	Germany	3:25.41	+21.06
5	5	Han Seung-hee	South Korea	3:25.96	+21.61
6	6	Indira Liseth	Norway	Ranked as last	
