= Kim Yun-ji (skier) =

South Korean Para Nordic skier and swimmer (born 2006)

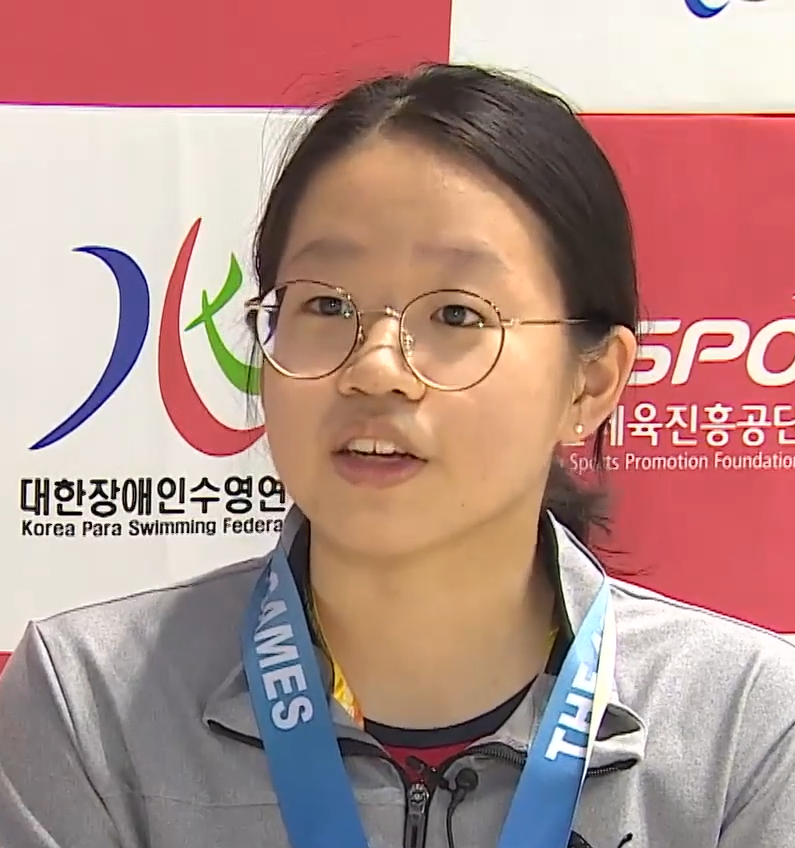
- Kim at the 20th National Winter Para Games in 2023

Personal information
- Born: 9 June 2006 (age 20) Seoul, South Korea

Sport
- Country: South Korea
- Sport: Para Nordic skiing (Para cross-country skiing and Para biathlon), Para swimming
- Disability class: LW10.5
Medal record
Representing South Korea
Women's Para biathlon
Paralympic Games
Gold medal – first place	2026 Milano Cortina	12.5km sitting
Silver medal – second place	2026 Milano Cortina	Sprint pursuit sitting
Women's Para cross-country skiing
Paralympic Games
Gold medal – first place	2026 Milano Cortina	20 km sitting
Silver medal – second place	2026 Milano Cortina	Sprint sitting
Silver medal – second place	2026 Milano Cortina	10 km sitting
World Championships
Gold medal – first place	2025 Trondheim	Sprint sitting

Kim Yun-ji (Korean: 김윤지; born 9 June 2006) is a South Korean Para Nordic skier and swimmer.

== Career ==
Kim competed at the FIS Nordic World Ski Championships 2025 and won a gold medal in the sprint sitting event with a time of 3:04.35. This marked the first time that para cross-country athletes raced in the same stadium and on the same day as their able-bodied counterparts. She won four gold medals at the 23rd National Winter Para Games and was named MVP, becoming the first female to claim award twice, after winning the award in 2023.

In February 2026, she was selected to represent South Korea at the 2026 Winter Paralympics. She won a gold medal in the individual sitting event with a time of 38:00.1. She became the first South Korean woman to win a gold medal at the Winter Paralympic Games in an individual event.
