= Igor Sikorski (skier) =

Polish paralympic alpine skier

Personal information
- Nationality: Polish
- Born: 5 July 1990 (age 35) Göttingen, West Germany

Sport
- Country: Poland
- Sport: Paralympic alpine skiing
- Disability class: LW11
Medal record
Men's para-alpine skiing
Representing Poland
Winter Paralympics
Bronze medal – third place	Pyeongchang 2018	Giant slalom

Igor Sikorski (born 5 July 1990) is a German-born Polish male paralympic alpine skier. He made his Paralympic debut during the 2018 Winter Paralympics and claimed Poland's only medal at the 2018 Winter Paralympics after clinching a bronze medal in the men's giant slalom event.

In 2022, he won the silver medal in the men's giant slalom sitting alpine skiing event at the 2021 World Para Snow Sports Championships held in Lillehammer, Norway.

He represented Poland at the 2022 Winter Paralympics held in Beijing, China.
