= Poland at the 2022 Winter Paralympics =

- Flag of Poland
- IPC code: POL
- NPC: Polish Paralympic Committee
- Website: www.paralympic.org.pl

in Beijing, China 4 March 2022 – 13 March 2022
- Competitors: 11 (8 men and 3 women) in 4 sports
- Flag bearer: Andrzej Szczęsny
- Medals: Gold 0 Silver 0 Bronze 0 Total 0

Winter Paralympics appearances (overview)
- 1976; 1980; 1984; 1988; 1992; 1994; 1998; 2002; 2006; 2010; 2014; 2018; 2022; 2026

Poland competed at the 2022 Winter Paralympics in Beijing, China which took place between 4–13 March 2022.

== Competitors ==
The following is the list of number of competitors participating at the Games per sport/discipline.

Sport	Men	Women	Total
Alpine skiing	2	0	2
Biathlon	0	1	1*
Cross-country skiing	5	3	8*
Snowboarding	1	0	1
Total	8	3	11

== Alpine skiing ==
Igor Sikorski and Andrzej Szczęsny competed in alpine skiing.

Athlete	Event	Run 1		Run 2		Total	
Athlete	Event	Time	Rank	Time	Rank	Time	Rank
Igor Sikorski	Men's giant slalom, sitting	DNF					
Igor Sikorski	Men's slalom, sitting	DNF					
Igor Sikorski	Men's super combined, sitting	DNF					
Igor Sikorski	Men's super-G, sitting	—N/a				DNF	
Andrzej Szczęsny	Men's giant slalom, standing	1:06.14	23	1:03.72	24	2:09.86	23
Andrzej Szczęsny	Men's slalom, standing	50.58	25	DNF			

== Biathlon ==
Poland competed in biathlon.

Athlete	Events	Final		
Athlete	Events	Missed Shots	Result	Rank
Piotr Garbowski; Guide: Jakub Twardowski	Men's sprint, visually impaired	3	21:19.9	11
Paweł Gil; Guide: Michał Lańda	Men's sprint, visually impaired	2	22:48.5	12
Paweł Gil; Guide: Michał Lańda	Men's middle distance, visually impaired	3	45:43.8	10
Paweł Gil; Guide: Michał Lańda	Men's individual, visually impaired	5	57:22.8	7
Paweł Nowicki; Guide: Jan Kobryń	Men's sprint, visually impaired	5	24:18.5	13
Iweta Faron	Women's sprint, standing	0	20:26.2	5
Iweta Faron	Women's middle distance, standing	DNS		
Iweta Faron	Women's individual, standing	DNF		
Aneta Górska; Guide: Catherine Spierenbug	Women's sprint, visually impaired	7	33:44.3	8
Monika Kukla	Women's sprint, sitting	6	29:15.2	11
Monika Kukla	Women's middle distance, sitting	7	44:41.7	10
Monika Kukla	Women's individual, sitting	7	58:32.3	10

== Cross-country skiing ==
Poland competed in cross-country skiing.

Men

Athlete	Class	Event	Qualification		Semifinal		Final	
Athlete	Class	Event	Time	Rank	Time	Rank	Time	Rank
Piotr Garbowski; Guide: Jakub Twardowski	B3	Sprint, visually impaired	2:48.55	7 Q	4:01.4	4	Did not advance	
Piotr Garbowski; Guide: Jakub Twardowski	B3	Middle distance, visually impaired	—N/a				38:46.2	11
Piotr Garbowski; Guide: Jakub Twardowski	B3	Long distance, visually impaired	—N/a				1:06:00.7	6
Paweł Gil; Guide: Michał Lańda	B3	Sprint, visually impaired	3:11.03	15	Did not advance			
Paweł Gil; Guide: Michał Lańda	B3	Middle distance, visually impaired	—N/a				44:02.1	14
Paweł Nowicki; Guide: Jan Kobryń	B1	Sprint, visually impaired	DNF					
Paweł Nowicki; Guide: Jan Kobryń	B1	Middle distance, visually impaired	—N/a				44:30.7	15
Krzysztof Plewa	LW12	Sprint, sitting	2:37.42	23	Did not advance			
Krzysztof Plewa	LW12	Middle distance, sitting	—N/a				36:13.7	14
Witold Skupień	LW5/7	Sprint, standing	3:00.98	17	Did not advance			
Witold Skupień	LW5/7	Middle distance, standing	—N/a				39:52.1	11
Witold Skupień	LW5/7	Long distance, standing	—N/a				55:22.2	5

Women

Athlete	Class	Event	Qualification		Semifinal		Final	
Athlete	Class	Event	Time	Rank	Time	Rank	Time	Rank
Iweta Faron	LW8	Sprint, standing	3:27.48	9 Q	4:53.7	5	Did not advance	
Iweta Faron	LW8	Middle distance, standing	—N/a				44:20.4	8
Aneta Górska; Guide: Catherine Spierenbug	B2	Sprint, visually impaired	4:05.24	9	Did not advance			
Aneta Górska; Guide: Catherine Spierenbug	B2	Middle distance, visually impaired	—N/a				DNF	
Monika Kukla	LW12	Sprint, sitting	3:11.66	13	Did not advance			
Monika Kukla	LW12	Middle distance, sitting	—N/a				31:50.2	11

Relay

Athletes	Event	Time	Rank
Witold Skupień; Iweta Faron	Mixed relay	30:02.2	6
Monika Kukla; Paweł Nowicki; Guide: Jan Kobryń; Krzysztof Plewa; Paweł Gil; Guide: Michał Lańda	Open relay	34:27.3	11

== Snowboarding ==
One snowboarder competed in snowboarding.

Banked slalom

Athlete	Event	Run 1	Run 2	Best	Rank
Wojciech Taraba	Men's SB-LL2	1:17.09	1:15.18	1:15.18	19

Snowboard cross

Athlete	Event	Qualification			Quarterfinal	Semifinal	Final
Athlete	Event	Run 1	Run 2	Rank	Position	Position	Position
Wojciech Taraba	Men's SB-LL2	1:12.72	1:10.40	20	did not advance		

Qualification legend: Q - Qualify to next round; FA - Qualify to medal final; FB - Qualify to consolation final

== See also ==
- Poland at the Paralympics
- Poland at the 2022 Winter Olympics
