= Poland at the 2018 Winter Paralympics =

- IPC code: POL
- NPC: Polish Paralympic Committee
- Website: www.paralympic.org.pl

in Pyongchang
- Competitors: 8 in 4 sports
- Flag bearer: Kamil Rosiek
- Medals Ranked 25th: Gold 0 Silver 0 Bronze 1 Total 1

Winter Paralympics appearances (overview)
- 1976; 1980; 1984; 1988; 1992; 1994; 1998; 2002; 2006; 2010; 2014; 2018; 2022; 2026

Poland competed at the 2018 Winter Paralympics in Pyongchang, South Korea, held between 7–16 March 2018.

== Medalists ==
Medal	Name	Sport	Event	Date
Bronze	Igor Sikorski	Alpine skiing	Men's giant slalom, sitting	14 March

== Alpine skiing ==
Men

Athlete	Event	Run 1			Run 2			Final/Total		
Athlete	Event	Time	Diff	Rank	Time	Diff	Rank	Time	Diff	Rank
Maciej Krezel; Guide: Anna Ogarzynska	Downhill, visually impaired	1:38.25	+14.32	8	—N/a			1:38.25	+14.32	8
Maciej Krezel; Guide: Anna Ogarzynska	Super-G, visually impaired	1:38.14	+12.03	12	—N/a			1:38.14	+12.03	12
Maciej Krezel; Guide: Anna Ogarzynska	Combined, visually impaired	1:34.75	+9.73	10	52.20	+4.89	6	2:26.95	+12.73	6
Maciej Krezel; Guide: Anna Ogarzynska	Slalom, visually impaired	52.63	+4.67	7	51.50	+4.23	6	1:44.13	+8.01	6
Maciej Krezel; Guide: Anna Ogarzynska	Giant slalom, visually impaired	1:13.75	+8.63	10	1:12.68	+7.29	10	2:26.43	+15.92	10
Igor Sikorski	Downhill, sitting	1:31.69	+7.58	15	—N/a			1:31.69	+7.58	15
Igor Sikorski	Super-G, sitting	1:28.41	+2.58	10	—N/a			1:28.41	+2.58	10
Igor Sikorski	Combined, sitting	DNF			DNS			DNF		
Igor Sikorski	Slalom, sitting	52.25	+3.85	7	50.89	+0.39	5	1:43.14	+3.32	6
Igor Sikorski	Giant slalom, sitting	1:08.69	+2.39	3	1:07.21	+1.24	2	2:15.90	+2.45	3rd place, bronze medalist(s)

== Biathlon ==
Men

Athlete	Events	Final				
Athlete	Events	Real Time	Calculated Time	Missed Shots	Result	Rank
Iweta Faron	6km, standing	24:40.3	23:41.1	3+4	23:41.1	15
Iweta Faron	10km, standing	44:08.8	44:08.8	2 + 2 + 1 + 0	42:22.8	8
Iweta Faron	12.5km, standing	42:11.9	42:11.9	4 + 1 + 2 + 2	42:11.9	12
Piotr Garbowski; Guide: Jakub Twardowski	7.5km, visually impaired	26:32.2	26:32.2	4+3	26:32.2	16
Piotr Garbowski; Guide: Jakub Twardowski	12.5km, visually impaired	53:11.7	53:11.7	2 + 3 + 2 + 4	53:11.7	12
Piotr Garbowski; Guide: Jakub Twardowski	15km, visually impaired	DNF				
Kamil Rosiek	7.5km, sitting	27:25.6	27:25.6	1+1	27:25.6	17
Kamil Rosiek	12.5km, sitting	56:29.0	56:29.0	1 + 1 + 2 + 1	56:29.0	15
Kamil Rosiek	15km, sitting	56:35.1	56:35.1	0 + 0 + 1 + 0	56:35.1	12
Witold Skupien	7.5km, standing	23:57.5	21:05.0	3+0	21:05.0	11

== Cross-country skiing ==
Men

Athlete	Event	Qualification			Semifinal		Final		
Athlete	Event	Real Time	Result	Rank	Result	Rank	Real Time	Result	Rank
Iweta Faron	15km, sitting	—N/a					DNF		
Kamil Rosiek	1km sprint classic, sitting	3:30.01	+29.45	22	did not qualify				
Kamil Rosiek	10km free, sitting	—N/a					DNF		
Kamil Rosiek	15km, sitting	—N/a					48:35.5	48:35.5	21
Witold Skupien	1.5km sprint classic, standing	4:35.59	3:40.47	6 Q	4:56.4	4	did not qualify		
Witold Skupien	10km free, standing	—N/a					31:22.4	25:05.9	6
Witold Skupien	20km free, standing	—N/a					55:44.1	49:02.8	5
Łukasz Kubica; Guide: Wojciech Suchwałko	1.5km sprint classic, visually impaired	4:26.23	+58.27	16	did not qualify				
Łukasz Kubica; Guide: Wojciech Suchwałko	10km free, visually impaired	—N/a					28:46.3	28:46.3	12
Łukasz Kubica; Guide: Wojciech Suchwałko	20km free, visually impaired	—N/a					1:01:13.9	1:01:13.9	13
Piotr Garbowski; Guide: Jakub Twardowski	1.5km sprint classic, visually impaired	3:59.34	+31.38	10	did not qualify				
Piotr Garbowski; Guide: Jakub Twardowski	10km free, visually impaired	—N/a					27:16.5	27:16.5	9
Piotr Garbowski; Guide: Jakub Twardowski	20km free, visually impaired	—N/a					53:46.4	53:46.4	9

Relay

Athletes	Event	Final	
Athletes	Event	Time	Rank
Piotr Garbowski; Guide: Jakub Twardowski; Witold Skupien; Kamil Rosiek; Witold Skupien	4 x 2.5km open relay	26:08.4	9

== Snowboarding ==
Men

Athlete	Event	Race 1		Race 2		Race 3		Total	
Athlete	Event	Time	Rank	Time	Rank	Time	Rank	Time	Rank
Wojciech Taraba	Banked Slalom	DNS						DNF	

== See also ==
- Poland at the Paralympics
- Poland at the 2018 Winter Olympics
