= Wang Chenyang =

Chinese Para cross-country skier (born 2002)

Personal information
- Born: 8 January 2002 (age 24) Shijiazhuang, China

Sport
- Country: China
- Sport: Para cross-country skiing
- Disability class: LW5/7
- Coached by: Zhu Dewen
Medal record
Men's Para cross-country skiing
Representing China
Paralympic Games
Gold medal – first place	2022 Beijing	12.5 km standing
Gold medal – first place	2026 Milano Cortina	4 × 2.5 km open relay
Gold medal – first place	2026 Milano Cortina	20 km standing
Silver medal – second place	2022 Beijing	4 × 2.5 km mixed relay

Wang Chenyang (born 8 January 2002) is a Chinese Para cross-country skier. He is a three-time Paralympian.

== Career ==
He represented China at the 2018 Winter Paralympics. He again represented China at the 2022 Winter Paralympics and won a gold medal in the men's 12.5 kilometre event, and a silver medal in the 4 × 2.5 kilometre mixed relay.
