= Simona Bubeníčková =

Czech Para Nordic skier (born 2008)

Personal information
- Born: 2 July 2008 (age 18) Náchod, Czech Republic

Sport
- Country: Czech Republic
- Sport: Para Nordic skiing (Para cross-country skiing and Para biathlon)
- Disability: Visually impaired
- Disability class: NS1
Medal record
Representing Czech Republic
Women's Para biathlon
Paralympic Games
Silver medal – second place	2026 Milano Cortina	Individual
Bronze medal – third place	2026 Milano Cortina	Sprint pursuit
Women's Para cross-country skiing
Paralympic Games
Silver medal – second place	2026 Milano Cortina	10 km classical
Silver medal – second place	2026 Milano Cortina	20 km freestyle
World Championships
Silver medal – second place	2025 Trondheim	Sprint

Simona Bubeníčková (born 2 July 2008) is a Czech visually impaired Para cross-country skier and biathlete.

== Career ==
In February 2025, Bubeníčková competed at the 2025 Para Cross-Country World Championships and won a gold medal in the 10 kilometre classic event. She also won a silver medal in the 20 kilometre freestyle event. The next month she competed at the FIS Nordic World Ski Championships 2025 and won a silver medal in the sprint with a time of 4:02.09. This marked the first time that para cross-country athletes raced in the same stadium and on the same day as their able-bodied counterparts.

In February 2026, she was selected to represent the Czech Republic at the 2026 Winter Paralympics. She won a silver medal in the biathlon individual, in the cross-country skiing 10 km classical and 20 km freestyle. Bubeníčková won a bronze medal in the biathlon sprint pursuit.
