= Leonie Walter =

German Para cross-country skier and biathlete (born 2004)

Personal information
- Full name: Leonie Maria Walter
- Born: 17 January 2004 (age 22) Freiburg, Germany

Sport
- Country: Germany
- Sport: Para Nordic skiing (Para cross-country skiing and Para biathlon)
- Disability: Macular hypoplasia
- Disability class: NS2
- Club: SC St. Peter
- Coached by: Ralf Rombach
Medal record
Representing Germany
Women's Para biathlon
Paralympic Games
Gold medal – first place	2022 Beijing	10 km
Bronze medal – third place	2022 Beijing	6 km
Bronze medal – third place	2022 Beijing	12.5 km
Bronze medal – third place	2026 Milano Cortina	Sprint
Bronze medal – third place	2026 Milano Cortina	Sprint pursuit
World Championships
Gold medal – first place	2023 Östersund	7.5 km sprint
Gold medal – first place	2023 Östersund	10 km
Bronze medal – third place	2023 Östersund	12.5 km Individual
Women's Para cross-country skiing
Paralympic Games
Bronze medal – third place	2022 Beijing	15 km classical
Bronze medal – third place	2026 Milano Cortina	10 km classical
World Championships
Silver medal – second place	2023 Östersund	18 km individual
Silver medal – second place	2023 Östersund	10 km freestyle
Bronze medal – third place	2023 Östersund	4×2.5 km mixed relay
Bronze medal – third place	2025 Trondheim	Sprint
Winter Universiade
Gold medal – first place	2025 Torino	10 km freestyle
Gold medal – first place	2025 Torino	Sprint classical

Leonie Maria Walter (born 17 January 2004) is a German visually impaired Para cross-country skier and biathlete. She represented Germany at the 2022 and 2026 Winter Paralympics.

== Career ==
Walter represented Germany at the 2022 Winter Paralympics and won a gold medal in the 10 kilometres, and three bronze medals in the 6 kilometres, and 12.5 kilometres biathlon events, and in the 15 kilometre classical cross-country skiing event. Pirmin Strecker has competed as her sighted guide.

She represented Germany at the 2025 Winter World University Games and won a gold medal in the 10 kilometre freestyle event.

She represented Germany at the 2026 Winter Paralympics. During the sprint classical cross-country skiing event she was initially on the podium, however, she was downgraded for infringing the classic style, and Cong Jihong won the bronze medal.
