= Wang Yue (skier) =

Chinese Para biathlete and cross-country skier (born 1999)

Personal information
- Nationality: Chinese
- Born: 8 May 1999 (age 27)

Sport
- Country: China
- Sport: Para Nordic skiing (Para cross-country skiing and Para biathlon)
- Disability: Visually impaired
- Disability class: NS2
Medal record
Representing China
Women's Para biathlon
Paralympic Games
Gold medal – first place	2026 Milano Cortina	Sprint visually impaired
Gold medal – first place	2026 Milano Cortina	Individual visually impaired
Silver medal – second place	2026 Milano Cortina	Sprint pursuit visually impaired
Bronze medal – third place	2022 Beijing	10 km visually impaired
Women's Para cross-country skiing
Paralympic Games
Silver medal – second place	2022 Beijing	10 km free
Bronze medal – third place	2026 Milano Cortina	20 km free
Bronze medal – third place	2026 Milano Cortina	4 × 2.5 km mixed relay

Wang Yue (born 8 May 1999) is a Chinese visually impaired Para cross-country skier and biathlete. She represented China at the 2022 and 2026 Winter Paralympics.

== Career ==
Wang represented China at the 2022 Winter Paralympics and won a silver medal in the 10 kilometre free cross-country skiing event and a bronze medal in the 10 kilometre biathlon event.

In February 2026, she was again selected to represent China at the 2026 Winter Paralympics.
