= Cong Jihong =

Chinese Para Nordic skier (born 1999)

Personal information
- Born: 25 April 1999 (age 27) Liaoning, China

Sport
- Country: China
- Sport: Para Nordic skiing (Para cross-country skiing and Para biathlon)
- Disability: Visually impaired
- Disability class: NS3
Medal record
Women's Para cross-country skiing
Representing China
Paralympic Games
Bronze medal – third place	2026 Milano Cortina	Sprint visually impaired

Cong Jihong (born 25 April 1999) is a Chinese Para Nordic skier. She represented China at the 2026 Winter Paralympics.

== Career ==
In February 2026, Cong was selected to represent China at the 2026 Winter Paralympics. She won a bronze medal in the sprint visually impaired event with a time of 3:30.2. Leonie Walter was initially on the podium, however, she was downgraded for infringing the classic style.
