= Zhao Zhiqing =

Chinese Para biathlete (born 1997)

Personal information
- Born: 6 November 1997 (age 28) Zhangjiakou, China

Sport
- Country: China
- Sport: Para biathlon
- Disability class: LW5/7
Medal record
Women's Para biathlon
Representing China
Paralympic Games
Silver medal – second place	2022 Beijing	12.5 km standing
Silver medal – second place	2026 Milano Cortina	Individual standing
Bronze medal – third place	2022 Beijing	6 km standing

Zhao Zhiqing (born 6 November 1997) is a Chinese Para biathlete. She participated at the 2022 Winter Paralympics in the biathlon competition, and won the silver medal in the women's 12.5 kilometres with a time of 48:06.3 and won the bronze medal in the women's 6 kilometres standing event with a time of 20:05:1.
