= Shan Yilin =

Chinese paralympic biathlete

Sport
- Country: China
- Sport: Biathlon
- Disability class: LW12
Medal record
Representing China
Paralympic Games
Women's para-biathlon
Silver medal – second place	2022 Beijing	6 km sitting
Bronze medal – third place	2022 Beijing	12.5 km sitting
Women's para-cross country skiing
Silver medal – second place	2022 Beijing	4 × 2.5km mixed relay

Shan Yilin is a Chinese paralympic biathlete who competed at the 2022 Winter Paralympics.

== Career ==
Shan competed at the 2022 Winter Paralympics in the biathlon competition, and won the silver medal in the women's 6 kilometres and the bronze medal in the women's 12.5 kilometres event. She also won a silver medal in the 4 × 2.5 kilometre mixed relay cross-country skiing event.
