= Wang Shiyu =

Chinese Para Nordic skier (born 1999)

Personal information
- Born: 17 June 1999 (age 27)

Sport
- Country: China
- Sport: Para Nordic skiing (Para cross-country skiing and Para biathlon)
- Disability class: LW12
Medal record
Women's Para cross-country skiing
Representing China
Paralympic Games
Bronze medal – third place	2026 Milano Cortina	Sprint sitting

Wang Shiyu (born 17 June 1999) is a Chinese Para Nordic skier. She represented China at the 2022 and 2026 Winter Paralympics.

== Career ==
In February 2026, she was selected to represent China at the 2026 Winter Paralympics. She won a silver medal in the sprint sitting event with a time of 2:35.4.
