= Yurika Abe =

Japanese cross-country skier and biathlete

Yurika Abe (阿部 友里香, Abe Yurika; born 7 October 1995) is a Japanese cross-country skier and biathlete.

She competes in paralympic skiing in category LW6. Her left arm has nerve damage from her birth.

In the 2014 Winter Paralympics at Sochi she competed in the 6km standing biathlon, ranking 13th, and in standing cross-country skiing at distances of 1km sprint freestyle, 5km freestyle and 15km freestyle events, ranking 9th, 9th, and 8th respectively.

She also competed in the 2018 Winter Paralympics at Pyeongchang, where she ranked 9th in the 6km standing biathlon. She also placed 4th in the 4x2.5km Mixed Relay as a member of the Japanese team alongside teammates Momoko Dekijima, Yoshihiro Nitta, and Taiki Kawayoke.

Yurika Abe competed in multiple biathlon events at the 2022 Winter Paralympics at Beijing, including placing 8th in the Women's Long Distance Classic Standing. She again joined the Japanese team for the Mixed 4x2.5km Relay, which placed 7th overall.
