= Guo Yujie =

Chinese biathlete

Personal information
- Nationality: Chinese

Sport
- Country: China
- Sport: Paralympic biathlon
- Disability class: LW8
Medal record
Representing China
Women's para biathlon
Winter Paralympics
Gold medal – first place	2022 Beijing	6 km standing

Guo Yujie is a Chinese biathlete who competed at the 2022 Winter Paralympics.

== Career ==
Guo served as the flag bearer for China at the 2022 Winter Paralympics. She won a gold medal in the women's 6 kilometre standing event.

Paralympics
Preceded by Peng Yuanyuan	Flagbearer for China (with Wang Zhidong); Beijing 2022	Succeeded by Incumbent
