= Cross-country skiing at the 2018 Winter Paralympics – Women's 7.5 kilometre classical =

Women's 7.5 kilometre classical at the XII Paralympic Winter Games
- Paralympic cross-country skiing
- Venue: Alpensia Biathlon Centre, South Korea
- Dates: 17 March
- Competitors: 51 from 15 nations

Women's 7.5 kilometre classical (visually impaired) at the XII Paralympic Winter Games
- Competitors: 10 from 6 nations

Medalists
1st place, gold medalist(s)		Sviatlana Sakhanenka; Guide: Raman Yashchanka	Belarus
2nd place, silver medalist(s)		Mikhalina Lysova; Guide: Alexey Ivanov	Neutral Paralympic Athletes
3rd place, bronze medalist(s)		Carina Edlinger; Guide: Julian Edlinger	Austria

Women's 7.5 kilometre classical (standing) at the XII Paralympic Winter Games
- Competitors: 18 from 8 nations

Medalists
1st place, gold medalist(s)		Natalie Wilkie	Canada
2nd place, silver medalist(s)		Ekaterina Rumyantseva	Neutral Paralympic Athletes
3rd place, bronze medalist(s)		Emily Young	Canada

Women's 5 kilometre (sitting) at the XII Paralympic Winter Games
- Competitors: 23 from 12 nations

Medalists
1st place, gold medalist(s)		Oksana Masters	United States
2nd place, silver medalist(s)		Andrea Eskau	Germany
3rd place, bronze medalist(s)		Marta Zaynullina	Neutral Paralympic Athletes

The Women's 7.5 kilometre classical competition of the 2018 Winter Paralympics was held at Alpensia Biathlon Centre, South Korea. The competition took place on 17 March 2018.

== Medal table ==
Rank	Nation	Gold	Silver	Bronze	Total
1	Canada (CAN)	1	0	1	2
2	Belarus (BLR)	1	0	0	1
2	United States (USA)	1	0	0	1
4	Neutral Paralympic Athletes (NPA)	0	2	1	3
5	Germany (GER)	0	1	0	1
6	Austria (AUT)	0	0	1	1
Totals (6 entries)		3	3	3	9

== 7.5 km classical visually impaired ==
In the cross-country skiing visually impaired, the athlete with a visual impairment has a sighted guide. The two skiers are considered a team, and dual medals are awarded.

The race was started at 11:55.

Rank	Bib	Name	Country	Real Time	Calcuted Time	Difference
1st place, gold medalist(s)	137	Sviatlana Sakhanenka; Guide: Raman Yashchanka	Belarus	22:32.8	22:19.3	–
2nd place, silver medalist(s)	138	Mikhalina Lysova; Guide: Alexey Ivanov	Neutral Paralympic Athletes	23:09.5	22:55.6	+36.3
3rd place, bronze medalist(s)	140	Carina Edlinger; Guide: Julian Edlinger	Austria	23:37.1	23:22.9	+1:03.6
4	135	Marina Galitsyna; Guide: Maksim Pirogov	Neutral Paralympic Athletes	26:47.4	23:34.5	+1:15.2
5	136	Olha Prylutska; Guide: Borys Babar	Ukraine	24:37.1	24:22.3	+2:03.0
6	132	Ekaterina Moshkovskaya; Guide: Artem Norin	Neutral Paralympic Athletes	24:55.4	24:40.4	+2:21.1
7	139	Oksana Shyshkova; Guide: Vitaliy Kazakov	Ukraine	24:58.3	24:43.3	+2:24.0
8	134	Yadviha Skorabahataya; Guide: Anastasia Kirillova	Belarus	26:07.8	25:52.1	+3:32.8
9	133	Mia Zutter; Guide: Katarina Trygstad-Saari	United States	27:53.0	27:53.0	+5:33.7
10	131	Yokutkhon Kholbekova; Guide: none	Uzbekistan	42:10.3	41:45.0	+19:25.7

== 7.5 km classical standing ==
The race was started at 11:45.

Rank	Bib	Name	Country	Real Time	Calculated Time	Difference
1st place, gold medalist(s)	118	Natalie Wilkie	Canada	24:24.0	22:12.2	–
2nd place, silver medalist(s)	128	Ekaterina Rumyantseva	Neutral Paralympic Athletes	27:47.3	22:13.8	+1.6
3rd place, bronze medalist(s)	124	Emily Young	Canada	24:42.1	22:13.9	+1.7
4	125	Anna Milenina	Neutral Paralympic Athletes	24:46.0	22:32.3	+20.1
5	122	Vilde Nilsen	Norway	23:31.0	22:34.6	+22.4
6	127	Liudmyla Liashenko	Ukraine	25:38.8	23:20.3	+1:08.1
7	117	Larysa Varona	Belarus	26:07.7	23:46.6	+1:34.4
8	123	Brittany Hudak	Canada	26:11.0	23:49.6	+1:37.4
9	121	Iryna Bui	Ukraine	26:20.8	23:58.5	+1:46.3
10	126	Iuliia Batenkova-Bauman	Ukraine	27:08.9	24:26.0	+2:13.8
11	111	Grace Miller	United States	26:51.5	24:26.5	+2:14.3
12	120	Bohdana Konashuk	Ukraine	27:44.0	24:57.6	+2:45.4
13	116	Momoko Dekijima	Japan	27:48.6	25:01.7	+2:49.5
14	119	Yurika Abe	Japan	28:59.7	26:23.1	+4:10.9
15	115	Natalia Bratiuk	Neutral Paralympic Athletes	29:02.2	26:25.4	+4:13.2
16	114	Yuliya Mikheeva	Neutral Paralympic Athletes	29:46.1	27:05.4	+4:53.2
17	112	Darya Fedzkovich	Belarus	30:11.0	28:58.6	+6:46.4
18	113	Peng Yuanyuan	China	32:16.2	29:21.9	+7:09.7

== 5 km sitting ==
The race was started at 13:00.

Rank	Bib	Name	Country	Real Time	Calculated Time	Difference
1st place, gold medalist(s)	213	Oksana Masters	United States	16:42.0	16:42.0	–
2nd place, silver medalist(s)	212	Andrea Eskau	Germany	17:58.2	16:53.5	+11.5
3rd place, bronze medalist(s)	211	Marta Zaynullina	Neutral Paralympic Athletes	17:25.4	17:25.4	+43.4
4	206	Nadezhda Fedorova	Neutral Paralympic Athletes	17:27.3	17:27.3	+45.3
5	209	Irina Gulyayeva	Neutral Paralympic Athletes	17:43.2	17:43.2	+1:01.2
6	202	Kendall Gretsch	United States	18:30.8	17:46.4	+1:04.4
7	210	Birgit Skarstein	Norway	19:38.6	18:27.9	+1:45.9
8	205	Natalia Kocherova	Neutral Paralympic Athletes	18:29.0	18:29.0	+1:47.0
9	208	Liudmila Vauchok	Belarus	19:51.5	18:40.0	+1:58.0
10	204	Chu Beibei	China	19:00.0	19:00.0	+2:18.0
11	201	Jin Yawei	China	22:29.7	19:20.7	+2:38.7
12	197	Aline Rocha	Brazil	20:37.7	19:23.4	+2:41.4
13	198	Valiantsina Shyts	Belarus	21:48.2	19:37.4	+2:55.4
14	199	Sini Pyy	Finland	20:54.7	19:39.4	+2:57.4
15	195	Lee Do-yeon	South Korea	19:59.4	19:59.4	+3:17.4
16	203	Anja Wicker	Germany	22:29.0	20:14.1	+3:32.1
17	191	Cindy Ouellet	Canada	21:38.5	20:46.6	+4:04.6
18	196	Seo Vo-ra-mi	South Korea	23:54.9	21:31.4	+4:49.4
19	194	Joy Rondeau	United States	22:49.9	21:55.1	+5:13.1
20	192	Zhanyl Baltabayeva	Kazakhstan	22:01.1	22:01.1	+5:19.1
21	193	Nonno Nitta	Japan	25:13.7	22:42.3	+6:00.3
22	200	Akzhana Abdikarimova	Neutral Paralympic Athletes	26:32.0	23:52.8	+7:10.8
	207	Lidziya Hrafeyeva	Belarus	DNF		

== See also ==
- Cross-country skiing at the 2018 Winter Olympics
