= Cross-country skiing at the 2018 Winter Paralympics – Women's 1.5 km sprint classical =

Winter Paralympic event

Women's 1.5 km Sprint classical at the XII Paralympic Winter Games
- Paralympic cross-country skiing
- Venue: Alpensia Biathlon Centre in Pyeongchang, South Korea
- Dates: 14 March
- Competitors: 52 from 18 nations

Women's 1.5 km sprint (visually impaired) at the XII Paralympic Winter Games
- Competitors: 11 from 7 nations

Medalists
1st place, gold medalist(s)		Sviatlana Sakhanenka; Guide: Raman Yashchanka	Belarus
2nd place, silver medalist(s)		Mikhalina Lysova; Guide: Sergei Ivanov	Neutral Paralympic Athletes
3rd place, bronze medalist(s)		Oksana Shyshkova; Guide: Vitaliy Kazakov	Ukraine

Women's 1.5 km sprint (standing) at the XII Paralympic Winter Games
- Competitors: 16 from 8 nations

Medalists
1st place, gold medalist(s)		Anna Milenina	Neutral Paralympic Athletes
2nd place, silver medalist(s)		Vilde Nilsen	Norway
3rd place, bronze medalist(s)		Natalie Wilkie	Canada

Women's 1.1 km sprint (sitting) at the XII Paralympic Winter Games
- Competitors: 25 from 14 nations

Medalists
1st place, gold medalist(s)		Oksana Masters	United States
2nd place, silver medalist(s)		Andrea Eskau	Germany
3rd place, bronze medalist(s)		Marta Zaynullina	Neutral Paralympic Athletes

The women's 1.5 kilometre sprint classic competition of the 2018 Winter Paralympics was held at Alpensia Biathlon Centre in Pyeongchang. The competition took place on 14 March 2018.

== Medal table ==
Rank	Nation	Gold	Silver	Bronze	Total
1	Neutral Paralympic Athletes (NPA)	1	1	1	3
2	Belarus (BLR)	1	0	0	1
2	United States (USA)	1	0	0	1
4	Germany (GER)	0	1	0	1
4	Norway (NOR)	0	1	0	1
6	Canada (CAN)	0	0	1	1
6	Ukraine (UKR)	0	0	1	1
Totals (7 entries)		3	3	3	9

== Visually impaired ==
=== Qualification ===
The qualification was held at 11:25.

Rank	Bib	Name	Country	Real Time	Calculated Time	Difference	Notes
1	154	Sviatlana Sakhanenka; Guide: Raman Yashchanka	Belarus	4:23.26	4:20.63	–	Q
2	153	Mikhalina Lysova; Guide: Sergei Ivanov	Neutral Paralympic Athletes	4:39.61	4:36.81	+16.18	Q
3	151	Carina Edlinger; Guide: Julian Edlinger	Austria	4:42.17	4:39.35	+18.72	Q
4	156	Marina Galitsyna; Guide: Maksim Pirogov	Neutral Paralympic Athletes	5:21.79	4:43.18	+22.55	Q
5	152	Oksana Shyshkova; Guide: Vitaliy Kazakov	Ukraine	4:48.55	4:45.66	+25.03	Q
6	159	Ekaterina Moshkovskaya; Guide: Artem Norin	Neutral Paralympic Athletes	4:55.79	4:52.83	+32.20	Q
7	155	Olha Prylutska; Guide: Borys Babar	Ukraine	5:06.60	5:03.53	+42.90	Q
8	157	Yadviha Skorabahataya; Guide: Anastasia Kirillova	Belarus	5:07.19	5:04.12	+43.49	Q
9	158	Mia Zutter; Guide: Kristina Trygstad-Saari	United States	5:24.34	5:24.34	+1:03.71	
10	160	Yokutkhon Kholbekova; Guide:	Uzbekistan	9:16.72	9:11.15	+4:50.52	
11	161	Elaheh Gholifallah; Guide: Farzaneh Rezasoltani	Iran	10:39.78	9:23.01	+5:02.38	

=== Semifinals ===
Semifinal 1

Rank	Bib	Name	Country	Start	Time	Difference	Notes
1	191	Sviatlana Sakhanenka; Guide: Raman Yashchanka	Belarus	0:33	5:23.5	–	Q
2	195	Oksana Shyshkova; Guide: Vitaliy Kazakov	Ukraine	0:33	5:31.5	+8.0	Q
3	194	Marina Galitsyna; Guide: Maksim Pirogov	Neutral Paralympic Athletes	0:00	5:41.8	+18.3	
4	198	Yadviha Skorabahataya; Guide: Anastasia Kirillova	Belarus	0:33	5:43.5	+20.0	

Semifinal 2

Rank	Bib	Name	Country	Start	Time	Difference	Notes
1	192	Mikhalina Lysova; Guide: Sergei Ivanov	Neutral Paralympic Athletes	0:00	5:00.9	–	Q
2	193	Carina Edlinger; Guide: Julian Edlinger	Austria	0:00	5:02.7	+1.8	Q
3	196	Ekaterina Moshkovskaya; Guide: Artem Norin	Neutral Paralympic Athletes	0:00	5:04.5	+3.6	
4	197	Olha Prylutska; Guide: Borys Babar	Ukraine	0:00	5:16.1	+15.2	

=== Final ===
The final was held at 14:16.

Rank	Bib	Name	Country	Start	Time	Difference
1st place, gold medalist(s)	191	Sviatlana Sakhanenka; Guide: Raman Yashchanka	Belarus	0:00	4:29.9	–
2nd place, silver medalist(s)	192	Mikhalina Lysova; Guide: Sergei Ivanov	Neutral Paralympic Athletes	0:00	4:44.0	+14.1
3rd place, bronze medalist(s)	195	Oksana Shyshkova; Guide: Vitaliy Kazakov	Ukraine	0:00	4:45.6	+15.7
4	193	Carina Edlinger; Guide: Julian Edlinger	Austria	0:00	5:13.7	+43.8

== Standing ==
=== Qualification ===
The qualification was held at 10:50.

Rank	Bib	Name	Country	Real Time	Calculated Time	Difference	Notes
1	107	Vilde Nilsen	Norway	4:22.35	4:11.86	–	Q
2	110	Natalie Wilkie	Canada	4:51.85	4:25.58	+13.72	Q
3	105	Emily Young	Canada	4:58.06	4:28.25	+16.39	Q
4	102	Liudmyla Liashenko	Ukraine	4:55.71	4:29.10	+17.24	Q
5	106	Brittany Hudak	Canada	4:59.26	4:32.33	+20.47	Q
6	101	Ekaterina Rumyantseva	Neutral Paralympic Athletes	5:48.06	4:38.45	+26.59	Q
7	111	Larysa Varona	Belarus	5:07.46	4:39.79	+27.93	Q
8	112	Natalia Bratiuk	Neutral Paralympic Athletes	5:08.32	4:40.57	+28.71	Q
9	108	Bohdana Konashuk	Ukraine	5:10.43	4:42.49	+30.63	Q
10	104	Anna Milenina	Neutral Paralympic Athletes	5:11.44	4:43.41	+31.55	Q
11	103	Iuliia Batenkova-Bauman	Ukraine	5:20.15	4:48.14	+36.28	Q
12	115	Darya Fedzkovich	Belarus	5:00.65	4:48.62	+36.76	Q
13	109	Yurika Abe	Japan	5:21.30	4:49.17	+37.31	
14	113	Yuliya Mikheeva	Neutral Paralympic Athletes	5:23.85	4:54.70	+42.84	
15	114	Peng Yuanyuan	China	5:30.68	5:00.92	+49.06	
16	116	Grace Miller	United States	5:52.46	5:20.74	+1:08.88	

=== Semifinals ===
Semifinal 1

Rank	Bib	Name	Country	Start	Time	Difference	Notes
1	161	Vilde Nilsen	Norway	0:14	5:16.2	–	Q
2	165	Brittany Hudak	Canada	0:00	5:24.8	+8.6	Q
3	164	Liudmyla Liashenko	Ukraine	0:00	5:29.7	+13.5	Q
4	169	Bohdana Konashuk	Ukraine	0:00	5:33.2	+17.0	
5	168	Natalia Bratiuk	Neutral Paralympic Athletes	0:00	5:47.0	+30.8	
6	172	Darya Fedzkovich	Belarus	0:14	5:48.4	+32.2	

Semifinal 2

Rank	Bib	Name	Country	Start	Time	Difference	Notes
1	162	Natalie Wilkie	Canada	0:38	5:54.4	–	Q
2	163	Emily Young	Canada	0:35	5:55.5	+1.1	Q
3	170	Anna Milenina	Neutral Paralympic Athletes	0:38	5:56.3	+1.9	Q
4	166	Ekaterina Rumyantseva	Neutral Paralympic Athletes	0:00	5:58.6	+4.2	
5	167	Larysa Varona	Belarus	0:38	6:02.3	+7.9	
6	171	Iuliia Batenkova-Bauman	Ukraine	0:35	6:21.6	+19.1	

=== Final ===
The final was held at 13:48.

Rank	Bib	Name	Country	Start	Time	Difference
1st place, gold medalist(s)	170	Anna Milenina	Neutral Paralympic Athletes	0:03	5:11.1	–
2nd place, silver medalist(s)	161	Vilde Nilsen	Norway	0:17	5:14.2	+3.1
3rd place, bronze medalist(s)	162	Natalie Wilkie	Canada	0:03	5:14.3	+3.2
4	163	Emily Young	Canada	0:00	5:18.3	+7.2
5	164	Liudmyla Liashenko	Ukraine	0:03	5:23.4	+12.3
6	165	Brittany Hudak	Canada	0:03	6:00.3	+49.2

== Sitting ==
=== Qualification ===
The qualification was held at 10:17.

Rank	Bib	Name	Country	Real Time	Calculated Time	Difference	Notes
1	41	Oksana Masters	United States	3:29.86	3:29.86	–	Q
2	43	Marta Zaynullina	Neutral Paralympic Athletes	3:37.50	3:37.50	+7.64	Q
3	52	Kendall Gretsch	United States	3:46.91	3:37.83	+7.97	Q
4	42	Andrea Eskau	Germany	3:54.01	3:39.97	+10.11	Q
5	49	Natalia Kocherova	Neutral Paralympic Athletes	3:40.16	3:40.16	+10.30	Q
6	56	Valiantsina Shyts	Belarus	4:05.93	3:41.34	+11.48	Q
7	46	Lidziya Hrafeyeva	Belarus	3:44.16	3:44.16	+14.30	Q
8	44	Birgit Skarstein	Norway	3:58.63	3:44.31	+14.45	Q
9	53	Jin Yawei	China	4:26.92	3:49.55	+19.69	Q
10	48	Maria Iovleva	Neutral Paralympic Athletes	3:49.83	3:49.83	+19.97	Q
11	51	Anja Wicker	Germany	4:17.75	3:51.98	+22.12	Q
12	50	Chu Beibei	China	3:54.23	3:54.23	+24.37	Q
13	55	Sini Pyy	Finland	4:10.54	3:55.51	+25.65	
14	54	Akzhana Abdikarimova	Neutral Paralympic Athletes	4:25.23	3:58.71	+28.85	
15	45	Liudmila Vauchok	Belarus	4:17.30	4:01.86	+32.00	
16	47	Nadezhda Fedorova	Neutral Paralympic Athletes	4:04.81	4:04.81	+34.95	
17	63	Cindy Ouellet	Canada	4:22.12	4:11.64	+41.78	
18	59	Lee Do-yeon	South Korea	4:13.92	4:13.92	+44.06	
19	58	Seo Vo-ra-mi	South Korea	4:45.94	4:17.35	+47.49	
20	62	Zhanyl Baltabayeva	Kazakhstan	4:18.53	4:18.53	+48.67	
21	61	Nonno Nitta	Japan	4:49.54	4:20.59	+50.73	
22	57	Aline Rocha	Brazil	4:39.92	4:23.13	+53.27	
23	60	Joy Rondeau	United States	4:42.42	4:31.12	+1:01.26	
24	64	Krisztina Lorincz	Hungary	6:09.79	5:32.81	+2:02.95	
25	65	Nino Sabashvili	Georgia	8:45.72	8:24.69	+4:54.83	

=== Semifinals ===
Semifinal 1

Rank	Bib	Name	Country	Start	Time	Difference	Notes
1	121	Oksana Masters	United States	0:34	4:24.3	–	Q
2	124	Andrea Eskau	Germany	0:21	4:27.7	+3.4	Q
3	125	Natalia Kocherova	Neutral Paralympic Athletes	0:34	4:28.1	+3.8	Q
4	128	Birgit Skarstein	Norway	0:21	4:29.4	+5.1	
5	132	Chu Beibei	China	0:34	4:42.8	+18.5	
6	129	Jin Yawei	China	0:00	4:47.6	+23.3	

Semifinal 2

Rank	Bib	Name	Country	Start	Time	Difference	Notes
1	127	Lidziya Hrafeyeva	Belarus	0:23	4:23.2	–	Q
2	122	Marta Zaynullina	Neutral Paralympic Athletes	0:23	4:24.3	+1.1	Q
3	130	Maria Iovleva	Neutral Paralympic Athletes	0:23	4:27.3	+4.1	Q
4	123	Kendall Gretsch	United States	0:14	4:33.4	+10.2	
5	126	Valiantsina Shyts	Belarus	0:00	4:36.4	+13.2	
6	131	Anja Wicker	Germany	0:00	5:12.9	+49.7	

=== Final ===
The final was held at 13:20.

Rank	Bib	Name	Country	Start	Time	Difference
1st place, gold medalist(s)	121	Oksana Masters	United States	0:13	4:06.7	–
2nd place, silver medalist(s)	124	Andrea Eskau	Germany	0:00	4:08.8	+2.1
3rd place, bronze medalist(s)	122	Marta Zaynullina	Neutral Paralympic Athletes	0:13	4:10.4	+3.7
4	127	Lidziya Hrafeyeva	Belarus	0:13	4:16.4	+9.7
5	125	Natalia Kocherova	Neutral Paralympic Athletes	0:13	4:17.1	+10.4
6	130	Maria Iovleva	Neutral Paralympic Athletes	0:13	4:19.4	+12.7

== See also ==
- Cross-country skiing at the 2018 Winter Olympics
