= Biathlon at the Winter Paralympics =

- Governing body: IPC
- Events: 18 (men: 9; women: 9)

Games
- 1976; 1980; 1984; 1988; 1992; 1994; 1998; 2002; 2006; 2010; 2014; 2018; 2022; 2026
- Medalists

Biathlon has been contested at the Winter Paralympic Games since the Winter Games in 1988, in Innsbruck, Austria.

== Summary ==
In the winter Paralympics where the sport was introduced, only athletes with physical impairments were allowed to compete. In the following Winter Paralympics in 1992, competitors expanded to include those with visual impairments.

Athletes are separated into 3 categories: sitting, standing and visually impaired, and they compete in 3 events: sprint, middle distance, long distance.

Games	Year	Events	Best Nation
1			
2			
3			
4	1988	3	Finland
5	1992	4	Finland
6	1994	10	Germany
7	1998	12	Germany
8	2002	6	Germany
9	2006	12	Russia
10	2010	12	Russia
11	2014	18	Russia
12	2018	18	Neutral Paralympic Athletes
13	2022	18	Ukraine
14	2026	18	China

== Events ==
Event	Class	76	80	84	88	92	94	98	02	06	10	14	18	Years
15 km men	Standing											•	•	2
15 km men	Visually impaired											•	•	2
15 km men	Sitting											•	•	2
12.5 km men	Standing									•	•	•	•	4
12.5 km men	Visually impaired									•	•	•	•	4
12.5 km men	Sitting									•	•	•	•	4
7.5 km men	Standing				• • •	• •	• • •	• •	•	•		•	•	8
7.5 km men	Visually impaired					• •	• • •	• • •	•	•		•	•	7
7.5 km men	Sitting						• •	• • •	•	•		•	•	6
3 km men	Standing										•			1
3 km men	Visually impaired										•			1
2.4 km men	Sitting										•			1
12.5 km women	Standing									•	•	•	•	4
12.5 km women	Visually impaired									•	•	•	•	4
12.5 km women	Sitting											•	•	2
10 km women	Standing											•	•	2
10 km women	Visually impaired											•	•	2
10 km women	Sitting									•	•	•	•	4
7.5 km women	Standing						•	•	•	•				4
7.5 km women	Visually impaired						•	• •	•	•				4
7.5 km women	Sitting							•	•	•				3
6 km women	Standing											•	•	2
6 km women	Visually impaired											•	•	2
6 km women	Sitting											•	•	2
3 km women	Standing										•			1
3 km women	Visually impaired										•			1
2.4 km women	Sitting										•			1
Total Events					3	4	10	12	6	12	12	18	18	

== Medal table ==
Note: Last updated after the 2026 Winter Paralympics NPCs in italics no longer compete at the Winter Paralympics

Rank	Nation	Gold	Silver	Bronze	Total
1	Ukraine (UKR)	25	34	34	93
2	Russia (RUS)	24	27	15	66
3	Germany (GER)	23	15	29	67
4	China (CHN)	12	7	8	27
5	France (FRA)	8	5	4	17
6	United States (USA)	7	7	4	18
7	Norway (NOR)	6	4	8	18
8	Neutral Paralympic Athletes (NPA)	5	5	1	11
9	Canada (CAN)	4	5	8	17
10	Switzerland (SUI)	3	5	3	11
11	Finland (FIN)	3	2	4	9
12	Japan (JPN)	2	2	2	6
13	Netherlands (NED)	2	0	1	3
14	Belarus (BLR)	1	2	6	9
15	Sweden (SWE)	1	2	2	5
16	Czech Republic (CZE)	1	2	1	4
17	South Korea (KOR)	1	1	0	2
18	Denmark (DEN)	1	0	1	2
18	Kazakhstan (KAZ)	1	0	1	2
20	Unified Team	1	0	0	1
21	Austria (AUT)	0	4	0	4
22	Slovakia (SVK)	0	2	1	3
23	Italy (ITA)	0	0	1	1
23	Poland (POL)	0	0	1	1
Totals (24 entries)		131	131	135	397

As of 2026 Winter Paralympics

== See also ==
- Biathlon at the Winter Olympics
