= Cross-country skiing at the 2018 Winter Paralympics – Women's 15 kilometre free =

Women's 15 kilometre free at the XII Paralympic Winter Games
- Paralympic cross-country skiing
- Venue: Alpensia Biathlon Centre, South Korea
- Dates: 11, 12 March
- Competitors: 39 from 14 nations

Women's 15 kilometre free (visually impaired) at the XII Paralympic Winter Games
- Competitors: 9 from 5 nations

Medalists
1st place, gold medalist(s)		Sviatlana Sakhanenka; Guide: Raman Yashchanka	Belarus
2nd place, silver medalist(s)		Oksana Shyshkova; Guide: Vitaliy Kazakov	Ukraine
3rd place, bronze medalist(s)		Mikhalina Lysova; Guide: Alexey Ivanov	Neutral Paralympic Athletes

Women's 15 kilometre free (standing) at the XII Paralympic Winter Games
- Competitors: 11 from 7 nations

Medalists
1st place, gold medalist(s)		Ekaterina Rumyantseva	Neutral Paralympic Athletes
2nd place, silver medalist(s)		Anna Milenina	Neutral Paralympic Athletes
3rd place, bronze medalist(s)		Liudmyla Liashenko	Ukraine

Women's 12 kilometre (sitting) at the XII Paralympic Winter Games
- Competitors: 19 from 10 nations

Medalists
1st place, gold medalist(s)		Kendall Gretsch	United States
2nd place, silver medalist(s)		Andrea Eskau	Germany
3rd place, bronze medalist(s)		Oksana Masters	United States

The Women's 15 kilometre free competition of the 2018 Winter Paralympics was held at Alpensia Biathlon Centre, South Korea. The competition took place on 11 & 12 March 2018.

== Medal table ==
Rank	Nation	Gold	Silver	Bronze	Total
1	Neutral Paralympic Athletes (NPA)	1	1	1	3
2	United States (USA)	1	0	1	2
3	Belarus (BLR)	1	0	0	1
4	Ukraine (UKR)	0	1	1	2
5	Germany (GER)	0	1	0	1
Totals (5 entries)		3	3	3	9

== 15 km free visually impaired ==
In the cross-country skiing visually impaired, the athlete with a visual impairment has a sighted guide. The two skiers are considered a team, and dual medals are awarded.

The race was started on 12 March at 12:00.

Rank	Bib	Name	Country	Real Time	Calculated Time	Difference
1st place, gold medalist(s)	46	Sviatlana Sakhanenka; Guide: Raman Yashchanka	Belarus	49:41.5	49:11.7	–
2nd place, silver medalist(s)	48	Oksana Shyshkova; Guide: Vitaliy Kazakov	Ukraine	49:49.4	49:19.5	+7.8
3rd place, bronze medalist(s)	47	Mikhalina Lysova; Guide: Alexey Ivanov	Neutral Paralympic Athletes	53:01.0	52:29.2	+3:17.5
4	49	Carina Edlinger; Guide: Julian Edlinger	Austria	54:10.8	53:38.3	+4:26.6
5	43	Yadviha Skorabahataya; Guide: Anastasia Kirillova	Belarus	54:51.0	54:18.1	+5:06.4
6	45	Olha Prylutska; Guide: Borys Babar	Ukraine	55:13.6	54:40.5	+5:28.8
7	41	Ekaterina Moshkovskaia; Guide: Artem Norin	Neutral Paralympic Athletes	59:19.5	58:43.9	+9:32.2
8	42	Mia Zutter; Guide: Kristina Trygstad-Saari	United States	1:02:20.2	1:02:20.2	+13:08.5
	44	Marina Galitsyna; Guide: Maksim Pirogov	Neutral Paralympic Athletes	DNF		

== 15 km free standing ==
The race was started on 12 March at 12:15.

Rank	Bib	Name	Country	Real Time	Calculated Time	Difference
1st place, gold medalist(s)	61	Ekaterina Rumyantseva	Neutral Paralympic Athletes	56:23.6	49:37.6	–
2nd place, silver medalist(s)	58	Anna Milenina	Neutral Paralympic Athletes	53:02.9	50:55.6	+1:18.0
3rd place, bronze medalist(s)	60	Liudmyla Liashenko	Ukraine	53:14.4	51:06.6	+1:29.0
4	59	Iuliia Batenkova-Bauman	Ukraine	54:01.6	51:19.5	+1:41.9
5	57	Emily Young	Canada	54:35.2	51:51.4	+2:13.8
6	55	Natalie Wilkie	Canada	54:23.4	52:12.9	+2:35.3
7	54	Momoko Dekijima	Japan	58:55.0	55:58.3	+6:20.7
8	56	Bohdana Konashuk	Ukraine	59:39.9	57:16.7	+7:39.1
9	52	Peng Yuanyuan	China	1:10:22.3	1:07:33.4	+17:55.8
10	51	Grace Miller	United States	1:11:43.6	1:08:51.5	+19:13.9
	53	Iweta Faron	Poland	DNF		

== 12 km sitting ==
The race was started on 11 March at 11:15.

Rank	Bib	Name	Country	Real Time	Calculated Time	Difference
1st place, gold medalist(s)	40	Kendall Gretsch	United States	39:51.6	38:15.9	
2nd place, silver medalist(s)	48	Andrea Eskau	Germany	41:16.9	38:48.3	+32.4
3rd place, bronze medalist(s)	49	Oksana Masters	United States	39:04.9	39:04.9	+49.0
4	47	Marta Zaynullina	Neutral Paralympic Athletes	39:09.0	39:09.0	+53.1
5	43	Nadezhda Fedorova	Neutral Paralympic Athletes	39:46.5	39:46.5	+1:30.6
6	45	Irina Gulyayeva	Neutral Paralympic Athletes	40:20.6	40:20.6	+2:04.7
7	42	Maria Iovleva	Neutral Paralympic Athletes	40:54.7	40:54.7	+2:38.8
8	39	Jin Yawei	China	48:42.5	41:53.4	+3:37.5
9	41	Chu Beibei	China	42:26.7	42:26.7	+4:10.8
10	44	Liudmila Vauchok	Belarus	45:25.1	42:41.6	+4:25.7
11	37	Valiantsina Shyts	Belarus	48:07.4	43:18.7	+5:02.8
12	34	Seo Vo-ra-mi	South Korea	50:30.5	45:27.5	+7:11.6
13	33	Lee Do-yeon	South Korea	45:49.6	45:49.6	+7:33.7
13	35	Nan Yuyu	China	48:45.1	45:49.6	+7:33.7
15	36	Aline Rocha	Brazil	49:19.9	46:22.3	+8:06.4
16	38	Akzhana Abdikarimova	Neutral Paralympic Athletes	51:36.4	46:26.8	+8:10.9
17	32	Zhanyl Baltabayeva	Kazakhstan	48:51.9	48:51.9	+10:36.0
18	31	Cindy Ouellet	Canada	51:28.2	49:24.7	+11:08.8
	46	Birgit Skarstein	Norway	DNF		

== See also ==
- Cross-country skiing at the 2018 Winter Olympics
