= Neutral Paralympic Athletes at the 2018 Winter Paralympics =

- This flag is not correct. Please click here to see the correct one.
- IPC code: NPA

in Pyeongchang, South Korea
- Competitors: 30 in 5 sports
- Flag bearer: Volunteer
- Medals Ranked 2nd: Gold 8 Silver 10 Bronze 6 Total 24

Winter Paralympics appearances (overview)
- 2018; 2022–2026

Other related appearances
- Soviet Union (1988); Unified Team (1992); Russia (1994–2014)

Russian athletes competed as Neutral Paralympic Athletes at the 2018 Winter Paralympics in Pyeongchang, South Korea, held between 9–18 March 2018. The Russian Paralympic Committee remained suspended from the Paralympic movement since 2016, due to the state-sponsored doping programme scandal, but the International Paralympic Committee allowed athletes deemed clean to participate in five sports. They participated under the Paralympic flag, and the Paralympic anthem was used during ceremonies for those who won gold medals.

== Medalists ==
Medals by sport
Sport	1st place, gold medalist(s)	2nd place, silver medalist(s)	3rd place, bronze medalist(s)	Total
Biathlon	5	5	1	11
Cross-country skiing	2	4	3	9
Alpine skiing	1	1	2	4
Total	8	10	6	24

Medals by date
Day	Date	1st place, gold medalist(s)	2nd place, silver medalist(s)	3rd place, bronze medalist(s)	Total
Day 1	10 March	2	1	0	3
Day 2	11 March	0	0	0	0
Day 3	12 March	1	1	1	3
Day 4	13 March	2	3	2	7
Day 5	14 March	1	2	1	4
Day 6	15 March	0	0	0	0
Day 7	16 March	2	1	0	3
Day 8	17 March	0	2	2	4
Day 9	18 March	0	0	0	0
Total		8	10	6	24

Medal	Name	Sport	Event	Date
Gold	Ekaterina Rumyantseva	Biathlon	Women's 6 km, standing	10 March
Gold	Mikhalina Lysova; Guide: Alexey Ivanov	Biathlon	Women's 6 km, visually impaired	10 March
Gold	Ekaterina Rumyantseva	Cross-country skiing	Women's 15 km freestyle, standing	12 March
Gold	Ekaterina Rumyantseva	Biathlon	Women's 10 km, standing	13 March
Gold	Alexey Bugaev	Alpine skiing	Men's super combined, standing	13 March
Gold	Anna Milenina	Cross-country skiing	Women's 1.5 km sprint classical, standing	14 March
Gold	Anna Milenina	Biathlon	Women's 12.5 km, standing	16 March
Gold	Mikhalina Lysova; Guide: Alexey Ivanov	Biathlon	Women's 12.5 km, visually impaired	16 March
Silver	Anna Milenina	Biathlon	Women's 6 km, standing	10 March
Silver	Anna Milenina	Cross-country skiing	Women's 15 km freestyle, standing	12 March
Silver	Marta Zaynullina	Biathlon	Women's 10 km, sitting	13 March
Silver	Anna Milenina	Biathlon	Women's 10 km, standing	13 March
Silver	Mikhalina Lysova; Guide: Alexey Ivanov	Biathlon	Women's 10 km, visually impaired	13 March
Silver	Mikhalina Lysova; Guide: Alexey Ivanov	Cross-country skiing	Women's 1.5 km sprint classical, visually impaired	14 March
Silver	Alexey Bugaev	Alpine skiing	Men's giant slalom, standing	14 March
Silver	Ekaterina Rumyantseva	Biathlon	Women's 12.5 km, standing	16 March
Silver	Ekaterina Rumyantseva	Cross-country skiing	Women's 7.5 km classical, standing	17 March
Silver	Mikhalina Lysova; Guide: Alexey Ivanov	Cross-country skiing	Women's 7.5 km classical, visually impaired	17 March
Bronze	Mikhalina Lysova; Guide: Alexey Ivanov	Cross-country skiing	Women's 15 km freestyle, visually impaired	12 March
Bronze	Irina Gulyayeva	Biathlon	Women's 10 km, sitting	13 March
Bronze	Valery Redkozubov; Guide: Evgeny Geroev	Alpine skiing	Men's super combined, visually impaired	13 March
Bronze	Marta Zaynullina	Cross-country skiing	Women's 1.1 km sprint, sitting	14 March
Bronze	Marta Zaynullina	Cross-country skiing	Women's 5 km, sitting	17 March
Bronze	Valery Redkozubov; Guide: Evgeny Geroev	Alpine skiing	Men's slalom, visually impaired	17 March

== Competitors ==
The following is the list of number of competitors that could participate at the Games per sport/discipline.

Sport	Men	Women	Total
Alpine skiing	6	3	9
Biathlon; Cross-country skiing	0	13	13
Snowboarding	3	0	3
Wheelchair curling	4	1	5
Total	13	17	30

== Alpine skiing ==
Men

Athlete	Class	Event	Run 1		Run 2		Total	
Athlete	Class	Event	Time	Rank	Time	Rank	Time	Rank
Sergey Alexandrov	LW3	Giant slalom, standing	1:26.16	37	1:27.87	29	2:54.03	29
Sergey Alexandrov	LW3	Slalom, standing	1:08.50	26	1:07.86	23	2:16.36	23
Alexander Alyabyev	LW6/8-2	Downhill, standing	—N/a				1:30.41	11
Alexander Alyabyev	LW6/8-2	Super-G, standing	—N/a				1:31.83	19
Alexander Alyabyev	LW6/8-2	Super combined, standing	DNF					
Alexander Alyabyev	LW6/8-2	Giant slalom, standing	1:11.24	17	1:10.70	14	2:21.94	15
Alexander Alyabyev	LW6/8-2	Slalom, standing	50.37	7	53.15	11	1:43.52	8
Alexey Bugaev	LW6/8-2	Downhill, standing	—N/a				1:28.68	7
Alexey Bugaev	LW6/8-2	Super-G, standing	—N/a				1:28.47	5
Alexey Bugaev	LW6/8-2	Super combined, standing	1:25.62	2	44.94	1	2:10.56	1st place, gold medalist(s)
Alexey Bugaev	LW6/8-2	Giant slalom, standing	1:06.96	3	1:06.53	2	2:13.49	2nd place, silver medalist(s)
Alexey Bugaev	LW6/8-2	Slalom, standing	DNF					
Ivan Frantsev; Guide: German Agranovskii	B2	Downhill, visually impaired	—N/a				1:30.72	5
Ivan Frantsev; Guide: German Agranovskii	B2	Super-G, visually impaired	—N/a				1:29.30	5
Ivan Frantsev; Guide: German Agranovskii	B2	Super combined, visually impaired	1:28.84	4	DNF			
Ivan Frantsev; Guide: German Agranovskii	B2	Giant slalom, visually impaired	1:11.22	8	1:10.17	8	2:21.39	8
Ivan Frantsev; Guide: German Agranovskii	B2	Slalom, visually impaired	DNF					
Alexey Mikushin	LW6/8-1	Downhill, standing	—N/a				1:35.67	23
Alexey Mikushin	LW6/8-1	Super-G, standing	—N/a				1:34.76	26
Alexey Mikushin	LW6/8-1	Super combined, standing	1:36.82	20	52.14	13	2:28.96	13
Alexey Mikushin	LW6/8-1	Giant slalom, standing	1:13.05	23	1:12.37	16	2:25.42	17
Alexey Mikushin	LW6/8-1	Slalom, standing	54.60	14	1:02.88	20	1:57.48	16
Valery Redkozubov; Guide: Evgeny Geroev	B2	Super-G, visually impaired	—N/a				1:31.26	6
Valery Redkozubov; Guide: Evgeny Geroev	B2	Super combined, visually impaired	1:29.79	6	47.31	1	2:17.10	3rd place, bronze medalist(s)
Valery Redkozubov; Guide: Evgeny Geroev	B2	Giant slalom, visually impaired	1:10.59	7	1:09.63	6	2:20.22	6
Valery Redkozubov; Guide: Evgeny Geroev	B2	Slalom, visually impaired	49.10	4	48.92	4	1:38.02	3rd place, bronze medalist(s)

Women

Athlete	Class	Event	Run 1		Run 2		Total	
Athlete	Class	Event	Time	Rank	Time	Rank	Time	Rank
Aleksandra Frantseva; Guide: Semen Plyaskin	B3	Giant slalom, visually impaired	1:26.89	11	1:23.44	11	2:50.33	11
Aleksandra Frantseva; Guide: Semen Plyaskin	B3	Slalom, visually impaired	1:02.35	9	1:06.38	10	2:08.73	10
Anastasia Khorosheva	LW9-2	Giant slalom, standing	1:24.65	13	1:22.87	14	2:47.52	14
Anastasia Khorosheva	LW9-2	Slalom, standing	1:05.80	9	1:09.52	10	2:15.32	9
Maria Papulova	LW6/8-2	Downhill, standing	—N/a				1:36.12	5
Maria Papulova	LW6/8-2	Super-G, standing	—N/a				1:37.11	5
Maria Papulova	LW6/8-2	Super combined, standing	1:36.07	4	1:01.15	5	2:37.22	4
Maria Papulova	LW6/8-2	Giant slalom, standing	1:17.29	7	1:14.47	5	2:31.76	7
Maria Papulova	LW6/8-2	Slalom, standing	58.79	4	1:02.57	4	2:01.36	4

== Biathlon ==
Women

Athlete	Class	Events	Real Time	Result	Misses	Rank
Akzhana Abdikarimova	LW10.5	6 km, sitting	28:34.1	25:42.7	2 (1+1)	11
Akzhana Abdikarimova	LW10.5	10 km, sitting	58:25.1	52:34.6	5 (1+1+1+2)	10
Akzhana Abdikarimova	LW10.5	12.5 km, sitting	1:02:50.9	1:00:33.8	4 (0+1+2+1)	10
Natalia Bratiuk	LW8	6 km, standing	20:50.6	20:00.6	1 (1+0)	11
Natalia Bratiuk	LW8	10 km, standing	41:37.4	39:57.5	1 (0+1+0+0)	6
Natalia Bratiuk	LW8	12.5 km, standing	42:50.7	43:07.9	2 (1+0+0+1)	6
Nadezda Fedorova	LW12	6 km, sitting	24:54.4	24:54.4	5 (2+3)	10
Nadezda Fedorova	LW12	10 km, sitting	47:21.5	47:21.5	9 (2+1+5+1)	7
Marina Galitsyna; Guide: Maksim Pirogov	B1	6 km, visually impaired	24:12.1	21:17.8	3 (1+2)	5
Marina Galitsyna; Guide: Maksim Pirogov	B1	10 km, visually impaired	54:07.2	47:37.5	4 (1+1+2+0)	5
Irina Gulyayeva	LW12	6 km, sitting	22:22.4	22:22.4	1 (1+0)	4
Irina Gulyayeva	LW12	10 km, sitting	44:25.5	44:25.5	5 (1+2+2+0)	3rd place, bronze medalist(s)
Irina Gulyayeva	LW12	12.5 km, sitting	49:15.5	52:15.5	3 (0+2+1+0)	5
Maria Iovleva	LW12	12.5 km, sitting	52:12.2	57:12.2	5 (2+1+1+1)	7
Natalia Kocherova	LW12	6 km, sitting	22:41.1	22:41.1	0 (0+0)	5
Natalia Kocherova	LW12	10 km, sitting	47:07.5	47:07.5	4 (0+1+3+0)	6
Natalia Kocherova	LW12	12.5 km, sitting	50:53.1	51:53.1	1 (0+0+1+0)	4
Mikhalina Lysova; Guide: Alexey Ivanov	B2	6 km, visually impaired	18:59.7	18:48.3	0 (0+0)	1st place, gold medalist(s)
Mikhalina Lysova; Guide: Alexey Ivanov	B2	10 km, visually impaired	40:36.8	40:12.4	1 (0+0+1+0)	2nd place, silver medalist(s)
Mikhalina Lysova; Guide: Alexey Ivanov	B2	12.5 km, visually impaired	38:05.5	37:42.6	0 (0+0+0+0)	1st place, gold medalist(s)
Yuliya Mikheeva	LW8	6 km, standing	22:49.0	21:54.2	2 (1+1)	14
Yuliya Mikheeva	LW8	10 km, standing	48:36.5	46:39.8	5 (1+1+2+1)	10
Yuliya Mikheeva	LW8	12.5 km, standing	45:28.6	45:39.5	2 (0+1+0+1)	8
Anna Milenina	LW8	6 km, standing	18:05.2	17:21.8	0 (0+0)	2nd place, silver medalist(s)
Anna Milenina	LW8	10 km, standing	36:58.7	35:30.0	2 (1+0+1+0)	2nd place, silver medalist(s)
Anna Milenina	LW8	12.5 km, standing	38:29.2	38:56.8	2 (0+1+0+1)	1st place, gold medalist(s)
Ekaterina Moshkovskaya; Guide: Artem Norin	B2	6 km, visually impaired	24:39.0	24:24.2	4 (2+2)	8
Ekaterina Moshkovskaya; Guide: Artem Norin	B2	10 km, visually impaired	DNF			
Ekaterina Moshkovskaya; Guide: Artem Norin	B2	12.5 km, visually impaired	44:48.4	56:21.5	12 (3+3+4+2)	5
Ekaterina Rumyantseva	LW5/7	6 km, standing	19:26.0	17:06.1	1 (0+1)	1st place, gold medalist(s)
Ekaterina Rumyantseva	LW5/7	10 km, standing	38:49.6	34:10.0	1 (0+1+0+0)	1st place, gold medalist(s)
Ekaterina Rumyantseva	LW5/7	12.5 km, standing	42:03.4	39:00.6	2 (0+2+0+0)	2nd place, silver medalist(s)
Marta Zaynullina	LW12	6 km, sitting	23:12.0	23:12.0	1 (0+1)	7
Marta Zaynullina	LW12	10 km, sitting	43:52.1	43:52.1	1 (0+0+1+0)	2nd place, silver medalist(s)
Marta Zaynullina	LW12	12.5 km, sitting	49:39.6	55:39.6	6 (1+1+2+2)	6

== Cross-country skiing ==
Women
Distance

Athlete	Class	Event	Real Time	Calculated Time	Deficit	Rank
Akzhana Abdikarimova	LW10.5	5 km, sitting	26:32.0	23:52.8	+7:10.8	22
Akzhana Abdikarimova	LW10.5	12 km, sitting	51:36.4	46:26.8	+8:10.9	16
Natalia Bratiuk	LW8	7.5 km classical, standing	28:59.7	26:23.1	+4:10.9	14
Nadezda Fedorova	LW12	5 km, sitting	17:27.3	17:27.3	+45.3	4
Nadezda Fedorova	LW12	12 km, sitting	39:46.5	39:46.5	+1:30.6	5
Marina Galitsyna; Guide: Maksim Pirogov	B1	7.5 km classical, visually impaired	26:47.4	23:34.5	+1:15.2	4
Marina Galitsyna; Guide: Maksim Pirogov	B1	15 km freestyle, visually impaired	DNF			
Irina Gulyayeva	LW12	5 km, sitting	17:43.2	17:43.2	+1:01.2	5
Maria Iovleva	LW12	12 km, sitting	40:54.7	40:54.7	+2:38.8	7
Natalia Kocherova	LW12	5 km, sitting	18:29.0	18:29.0	+1:47.0	8
Mikhalina Lysova; Guide: Alexey Ivanov	B2	7.5 km classical, visually impaired	23:09.5	22:55.6	+36.2	2nd place, silver medalist(s)
Mikhalina Lysova; Guide: Alexey Ivanov	B2	15 km freestyle, visually impaired	53:01.0	52:29.2	+3:17.5	3rd place, bronze medalist(s)
Yuliya Mikheeva	LW8	15 km freestyle, standing	29:46.1	27:05.4	+4:53.2	16
Anna Milenina	LW8	7.5 km classical, standing	24:46.0	22:32.3	+20.1	4
Anna Milenina	LW8	15 km freestyle, standing	53:02.9	50:55.6	+1:18.0	2nd place, silver medalist(s)
Ekaterina Moshkovskaya; Guide: Artem Norin	B2	7.5 km classical, visually impaired	24:55.4	24:40.4	+2:21.1	6
Ekaterina Moshkovskaya; Guide: Artem Norin	B2	15 km freestyle, visually impaired	59:19.5	58:43.9	+9:32.2	7
Ekaterina Rumyantseva	LW5/7	7.5 km classical, standing	27:47.3	22:13.8	+1.6	2nd place, silver medalist(s)
Ekaterina Rumyantseva	LW5/7	15 km freestyle, standing	56:23.6	49:37.6	–	1st place, gold medalist(s)
Marta Zaynullina	LW12	5 km, sitting	17:25.4	17:25.4	+43.7	3rd place, bronze medalist(s)
Marta Zaynullina	LW12	12 km, sitting	39:09.0	39:09.0	+53.1	4

Sprint

Athlete	Class	Event	Qualification			Semifinal		Final	
Athlete	Class	Event	Real Time	Calculated Time	Rank	Result	Rank	Result	Rank
Akzhana Abdikarimova	LW10.5	1.1 km, sitting	4:25.23	3:58.71	14	Did not advance			
Natalia Bratiuk	LW8	1.5 km classical, standing	5:08.32	4:40.57	8 Q	5:47.0	5	Did not advance	
Nadezda Fedorova	LW12	1.1 km, sitting	4:04.81	4:04.81	16	Did not advance			
Marina Galitsyna; Guide: Maksim Pirogov	B1	1.5 km classical, visually impaired	5:21.79	4:43.18	4 Q	5:41.8	3	Did not advance	
Maria Iovleva	LW12	1.1 km, sitting	3:49.83	3:49.83	10 Q	4:27.3	3 Q	4:19.4	6
Natalia Kocherova	LW12	1.1 km, sitting	3:40.16	3:40.16	5 Q	4:28.1	3 Q	4:17.1	5
Mikhalina Lysova; Guide: Alexey Ivanov	B2	1.5 km classical, visually impaired	4:39.61	4:36.81	2 Q	5:00.9	1 Q	4:44.0	2nd place, silver medalist(s)
Yuliya Mikheeva	LW8	1.5 km classical, standing	5:23.85	4:54.70	14	Did not advance			
Anna Milenina	LW8	1.5 km classical, standing	5:11.44	4:43.41	10 Q	5:56.3	3 Q	5:11.1	1st place, gold medalist(s)
Ekaterina Moshkovskaya; Guide: Artem Norin	B2	1.5 km classical, visually impaired	4:55.79	4:52.83	6 Q	5:04.5	3	Did not advance	
Ekaterina Rumyantseva	LW5/7	1.5 km classical, standing	5:48.06	4:38.45	6 Q	5:58.6	4	Did not advance	
Marta Zaynullina	LW12	1.1 km, sitting	3:37.50	3:37.50	2 Q	4:24.3	2 Q	4:10.4	3rd place, bronze medalist(s)

Relay

Athlete	Class	Event	Result	Deficit	Rank
Marta Zaynullina; Anna Milenina; Irina Gulyayeva; Mikhalina Lysova; Guide: Alexey Ivanov	LW12; LW8; LW12; B2	4 x 2.5 km mixed relay	26:06.8	+1:34.9	6
Natalia Kocherova; Ekaterina Rumyantseva; Nadezda Fedorova; Natalia Bratiuk	LW12; LW5/7; LW12; LW8	4 x 2.5 km open relay	28:18.4	+5:31.8	11

== Snowboarding ==
Men
Snowboard cross

Athlete	Class	Event	Qualification				1/8 final	Quarterfinal	Semifinal	Final	
Athlete	Class	Event	Run 1	Run 2	Best	Rank	Opposition	Opposition	Opposition	Opposition	Rank
Vladimir Igushkin	SB-LL2	Snowboard cross SB-LL2	1:21.52	1:18.58	1:18.58	18	Did not advance				
Mikhail Slinkin	SB-UL	Snowboard cross SB-UL	1:07.96	1:07.71	1:07.71	16 Q	Minor (USA); L	Did not advance			
Aleksandr Tsygankov	SB-LL2	Snowboard cross SB-LL2	1:55.53	DSQ	1:55.53	20	Did not advance				

Banked slalom

Athlete	Class	Event	Run 1	Run 2	Run 3	Best	Rank
Vladimir Igushkin	SB-LL2	Banked slalom SB-LL2	1:18.83	1:12.66	1:08.50	1:08.50	16
Mikhail Slinkin	SB-UL	Banked slalom SB-UL	1:05.15	57.79	57.00	57.00	10
Aleksandr Tsygankov	SB-LL2	Banked slalom SB-LL2	1:24.02	1:41.15	1:30.22	1:24.02	19

== Wheelchair curling ==
Summary

Team	Event	Group stage												Semifinal	Final / BM	
Team	Event	Opposition Score	Opposition Score	Opposition Score	Opposition Score	Opposition Score	Opposition Score	Opposition Score	Opposition Score	Opposition Score	Opposition Score	Opposition Score	Rank	Opposition Score	Opposition Score	Rank
Konstantin Kurokhtin; Andrei Meshcheriakov; Marat Romanov; Daria Shchukina; Alexander Shevchenko	Mixed	(Germany) GER; L 4–9	(South Korea) KOR; L 5–6	(Finland) FIN; W 12–5	(Norway) NOR; L 2–6	(United States) USA; W 6–4	(Slovakia) SVK; W 7–5	(United Kingdom) GBR; W 8–2	(Canada) CAN; L 4–5	(China) CHN; L 4–10	(Switzerland) SUI; W 6–4	(Sweden) SWE; L 3–7	5	Did not advance		

Robin round

Pos	Team	Pld	W	L	PF	PA	PD	PCT	Ends Won	Ends Lost	Blank Ends	Stolen Ends	Shot %	Qualification
1	South Korea	11	9	2	65	51	14	0.818	38	36	9	11	66%	Advance to playoffs
2	Canada	11	9	2	74	45	29	0.818	47	28	6	27	62%	Advance to playoffs
3	China	11	9	2	85	42	43	0.818	43	32	2	16	67%	Advance to playoffs
4	Norway	11	7	4	55	57	−2	0.636	41	35	5	15	58%	Advance to playoffs
5	Neutral Paralympic Athletes	11	5	6	61	63	−2	0.455	44	37	2	23	62%	
6	Switzerland	11	5	6	56	63	−7	0.455	36	45	2	11	61%	
7	Great Britain	11	5	6	57	53	4	0.455	41	41	6	20	62%	
8	Germany	11	5	6	57	68	−11	0.455	37	39	5	16	54%	
9	Slovakia	11	4	7	62	72	−10	0.364	39	46	1	11	57%	
10	Sweden	11	4	7	47	66	−19	0.364	29	45	8	8	57%	
11	Finland	11	2	9	53	87	−34	0.182	35	46	1	11	51%	
12	United States	11	2	9	58	63	−5	0.182	37	45	3	12	60%	

Source: Paralympic.org

Round-robin

Neutral Paralympic Athletes has a bye in draws 3, 5, 7, 10, 12 and 17.

Draw 1

Saturday, 10 March, 14:35

Sheet D	1	2	3	4	5	6	7	8	Final
Germany (Putzich) 🔨	0	2	0	1	0	0	3	3	9
Neutral Paralympic Athletes (Kurokhtin)	1	0	1	0	1	1	0	0	4

Draw 2

Saturday, 10 March, 14:35

Sheet B	1	2	3	4	5	6	7	8	EE	Final
South Korea (Seo)	1	0	1	0	2	0	0	1	1	6
Neutral Paralympic Athletes (Kurokhtin) 🔨	0	2	0	1	0	1	1	0	0	5

Draw 4

Sunday, 11 March, 14:35

Sheet A	1	2	3	4	5	6	7	8	Final
Neutral Paralympic Athletes (Kurokhtin)	3	0	0	0	1	3	5	X	12
Finland (S. Karjalainen) 🔨	0	1	2	2	0	0	0	X	5

Draw 6

Monday, 12 March, 9:35

Sheet C	1	2	3	4	5	6	7	8	Final
Norway (Stordahl) 🔨	1	1	0	1	1	2	0	X	6
Neutral Paralympic Athletes (Kurokhtin)	0	0	1	0	0	0	1	X	2

Draw 8

Monday, 12 March, 19:35

Sheet B	1	2	3	4	5	6	7	8	Final
Neutral Paralympic Athletes (Kurokhtin)	1	1	1	1	1	0	0	1	6
United States (Black) 🔨	0	0	0	0	0	3	1	0	4

Draw 9

Tuesday, 13 March, 9:35

Sheet C	1	2	3	4	5	6	7	8	Final
Neutral Paralympic Athletes (Kurokhtin)	1	1	0	2	3	0	0	X	7
Slovakia (Ďuriš) 🔨	0	0	2	0	0	2	1	X	5

Draw 11

Tuesday, 13 March, 19:35

Sheet A	1	2	3	4	5	6	7	8	Final
Neutral Paralympic Athletes (Kurokhtin)	1	1	0	1	2	2	1	X	8
Great Britain (Neilson) 🔨	0	0	2	0	0	0	0	X	2

Draw 13

Wednesday, 14 March, 14:35

Sheet D	1	2	3	4	5	6	7	8	Final
Canada (Ideson)	0	0	1	0	1	1	0	2	5
Neutral Paralympic Athletes (Kurokhtin) 🔨	1	0	0	1	0	0	2	0	4

Draw 14

Wednesday, 14 March, 19:35

Sheet A	1	2	3	4	5	6	7	8	Final
China (Wang) 🔨	3	0	0	3	0	3	1	X	10
Neutral Paralympic Athletes (Kurokhtin)	0	1	2	0	1	0	0	X	4

Draw 15

Thursday, 15 March, 9:35

Sheet B	1	2	3	4	5	6	7	8	Final
Switzerland (Wagner)	0	0	1	2	0	0	1	0	4
Neutral Paralympic Athletes (Kurokhtin) 🔨	2	1	0	0	1	1	0	1	6

Draw 16

Thursday, 15 March, 14:35

Sheet D	1	2	3	4	5	6	7	8	Final
Neutral Paralympic Athletes (Kurokhtin) 🔨	1	0	0	0	0	1	1	X	3
Sweden (Petersson Dahl)	0	0	2	3	2	0	0	X	7

== See also ==
- Olympic Athletes from Russia at the 2018 Winter Olympics
