= Biathlon at the 2018 Winter Paralympics – Women's 6 kilometres =

Women's 6 kilometres at the XII Paralympic Winter Games
- Paralympic biathlon
- Venue: Alpensia Biathlon Centre, South Korea
- Dates: 10 March
- Competitors: 39 from 12 nations

Women's 6 kilometres (visually impaired) at the XII Paralympic Winter Games
- Competitors: 8 from 4 nations

Medalists
| 1st place, gold medalist(s) | | Mikhalina Lysova; Guide: Alexey Ivanov | Neutral Paralympic Athletes |
| 2nd place, silver medalist(s) | | Oksana Shyshkova; Guide: Vitaliy Kazakov | Ukraine |
| 3rd place, bronze medalist(s) | | Sviatlana Sakhanenka; Guide: Raman Yashchanka | Belarus |

Women's 6 kilometres (standing) at the XII Paralympic Winter Games
- Competitors: 15 from 7 nations

Medalists
| 1st place, gold medalist(s) | | Ekaterina Rumyantseva | Neutral Paralympic Athletes |
| 2nd place, silver medalist(s) | | Anna Milenina | Neutral Paralympic Athletes |
| 3rd place, bronze medalist(s) | | Liudmyla Liashenko | Ukraine |

Women's 6 kilometres (sitting) at the XII Paralympic Winter Games
- Competitors: 16 from 8 nations

Medalists
| 1st place, gold medalist(s) | | Kendall Gretsch | United States |
| 2nd place, silver medalist(s) | | Oksana Masters | United States |
| 3rd place, bronze medalist(s) | | Lidziya Hrafeyeva | Belarus |

The Women's 6 kilometres competition of the 2018 Winter Paralympics was held at Alpensia Biathlon Centre, South Korea. The competition took place on 10 March 2018.

== Medal table ==
| Rank | Nation | Gold | Silver | Bronze | Total |
|---|---|---|---|---|---|
| 1 | Neutral Paralympic Athletes (NPA) | 2 | 1 | 0 | 3 |
| 2 | United States (USA) | 1 | 1 | 0 | 2 |
| 3 | Ukraine (UKR) | 0 | 1 | 1 | 2 |
| 4 | Belarus (BLR) | 0 | 0 | 2 | 2 |
| Totals (4 entries) | | 3 | 3 | 3 | 9 |

== Visually impaired ==
In the biathlon visually impaired, the athlete with a visual impairment has a sighted guide. The two skiers are considered a team, and dual medals are awarded.

The race was started at 13:15.

| Rank | Bib | Name | Country | Misses | Real time | Calculated Time | Difference |
|---|---|---|---|---|---|---|---|
| 1st place, gold medalist(s) | 108 | Mikhalina Lysova; Guide: Alexey Ivanov | Neutral Paralympic Athletes | 0 (0+0) | 18:59.7 | 18:48.3 | – |
| 2nd place, silver medalist(s) | 107 | Oksana Shyshkova; Guide: Vitaliy Kazakov | Ukraine | 0 (0+0) | 19:38.2 | 19:26.4 | +38.1 |
| 3rd place, bronze medalist(s) | 102 | Sviatlana Sakhanenka; Guide: Raman Yashchanka | Belarus | 3 (1+2) | 20:40.6 | 20:28.2 | +1:39.9 |
| 4 | 105 | Olha Prylutska; Guide: Borys Babar | Ukraine | 3 (0+3) | 21:30.4 | 21:17.5 | +2:29.2 |
| 5 | 103 | Marina Galitsyna; Guide: Maksim Pirogov | Neutral Paralympic Athletes | 3 (1+2) | 24:12.1 | 21:17.8 | +2:29.5 |
| 6 | 106 | Clara Klug; Guide: Martin Hartl | Germany | 1 (0+1) | 24:32.4 | 21:35.7 | +2:47.4 |
| 7 | 104 | Vivian Hösch; Guide: Florian Schillinger | Germany | 1 (1+0) | 24:48.7 | 21:50.1 | +3:01.8 |
| 8 | 101 | Ekaterina Moshkovskaya; Guide: Artem Norin | Neutral Paralympic Athletes | 4 (2+2) | 24:39.0 | 24:24.2 | +5:35.9 |

== Standing ==
The race was started at 11:45.

| Rank | Bib | Name | Country | Misses | Real time | Calculated Time | Difference |
|---|---|---|---|---|---|---|---|
| 1st place, gold medalist(s) | 65 | Ekaterina Rumyantseva | Neutral Paralympic Athletes | 1 (0+1) | 19:26.0 | 17:06.1 | – |
| 2nd place, silver medalist(s) | 63 | Anna Milenina | Neutral Paralympic Athletes | 0 (0+0) | 18:05.2 | 17:21.8 | +15.7 |
| 3rd place, bronze medalist(s) | 64 | Liudmyla Liashenko | Ukraine | 1 (1+0) | 18:28.7 | 17:44.4 | +38.3 |
| 4 | 62 | Yuliia Batenkova-Bauman | Ukraine | 1 (0+1) | 18:53.7 | 17:57.0 | +50.9 |
| 5 | 55 | Vilde Nilsen | Norway | 2 (0+2) | 19:18.0 | 18:43.3 | +1:37.2 |
| 6 | 61 | Iryna Bui | Ukraine | 2 (1+1) | 19:47.9 | 19:00.4 | +1:54.3 |
| 7 | 56 | Emily Young | Canada | 1 (0+1) | 20:08.6 | 19:08.2 | +2:02.1 |
| 8 | 57 | Brittany Hudak | Canada | 2 (1+1) | 20:11.0 | 19:22.6 | +2:16.5 |
| 9 | 59 | Yurika Abe | Japan | 0 (0+0) | 20:33.6 | 19:31.9 | +2:25.8 |
| 10 | 60 | Bohdana Konashuk | Ukraine | 1 (0+1) | 20:21.7 | 19:32.8 | +2:26.7 |
| 11 | 54 | Natalia Bratiuk | Neutral Paralympic Athletes | 1 (1+0) | 20:50.6 | 20:00.6 | +2:54.5 |
| 12 | 51 | Larysa Varona | Belarus | 1 (0+1) | 21:10.6 | 20:19.8 | +3:13.7 |
| 13 | 58 | Momoko Dekijima | Japan | 3 (1+2) | 22:00.5 | 20:54.5 | +3:48.4 |
| 14 | 52 | Yuliya Mikheeva | Neutral Paralympic Athletes | 2 (1+1) | 22:49.0 | 21:54.2 | +4:48.1 |
| 15 | 53 | Iweta Faron | Poland | 7 (3+4) | 24:40.3 | 23:41.1 | +6:35.0 |

== Sitting ==
The race was started at 10:00.

| Rank | Bib | Name | Country | Misses | Real time | Calculated Time | Difference |
|---|---|---|---|---|---|---|---|
| 1st place, gold medalist(s) | 8 | Kendall Gretsch | United States | 1 (0+1) | 22:46.7 | 21:52.0 | – |
| 2nd place, silver medalist(s) | 16 | Oksana Masters | United States | 0 (0+0) | 22:14.8 | 22:14.8 | +22.8 |
| 3rd place, bronze medalist(s) | 11 | Lidziya Hrafeyeva | Belarus | 0 (0+0) | 22:16.3 | 22:16.3 | +24.3 |
| 4 | 13 | Irina Gulyayeva | Neutral Paralympic Athletes | 1 (1+0) | 22:22.4 | 22:22.4 | +30.4 |
| 5 | 9 | Natalia Kocherova | Neutral Paralympic Athletes | 0 (0+0) | 22:41.1 | 22:41.1 | +49.1 |
| 6 | 15 | Andrea Eskau | Germany | 0 (0+0) | 24:33.1 | 23:04.7 | +1:12.7 |
| 7 | 12 | Marta Zaynullina | Neutral Paralympic Athletes | 1 (0+1) | 23:12.0 | 23:12.0 | +1:20.0 |
| 8 | 3 | Chu Beibei | China | 2 (1+1) | 24:23.4 | 24:23.4 | +2:31.4 |
| 9 | 14 | Anja Wicker | Germany | 1 (0+1) | 27:37.5 | 24:51.8 | +2:59.8 |
| 10 | 10 | Nadezhda Fedorova | Neutral Paralympic Athletes | 5 (2+3) | 24:54.4 | 24:54.4 | +3:02.4 |
| 11 | 7 | Akzhana Abdikarimova | Neutral Paralympic Athletes | 2 (1+1) | 28:34.1 | 25:42.7 | +3:50.7 |
| 12 | 5 | Lee Do-yeon | South Korea | 2 (1+1) | 26:11.3 | 26:11.3 | +4:19.3 |
| 13 | 4 | Nonno Nitta | Japan | 2 (1+1) | 30:33.5 | 27:30.2 | +5:38.2 |
| 14 | 2 | Joy Rondeau | United States | 0 (0+0) | 28:59.0 | 27:49.4 | +5:57.4 |
| 15 | 1 | Nan Yuyu | China | 6 (2+4) | 30:03.8 | 28:15.6 | +6:23.6 |
| | 6 | Sini Pyy | Finland | DNF | | | |

== See also ==
- Biathlon at the 2018 Winter Olympics
