= Biathlon at the 2018 Winter Paralympics – Women's 10 kilometres =

Women's 10 kilometres at the XII Paralympic Winter Games
- Paralympic biathlon
- Venue: Alpensia Biathlon Centre, South Korea
- Dates: 13 March
- Competitors: 31 from 10 nations

Women's 10 kilometres (visually impaired) at the XII Paralympic Winter Games
- Competitors: 6 from 3 nations

Medalists
1st place, gold medalist(s)		Oksana Shyshkova; Guide: Vitaliy Kazakov	Ukraine
2nd place, silver medalist(s)		Mikhalina Lysova; Guide: Alexey Ivanov	Neutral Paralympic Athletes
3rd place, bronze medalist(s)		Clara Klug; Guide: Martin Hartl	Germany

Women's 10 kilometres (standing) at the XII Paralympic Winter Games
- Competitors: 12 from 5 nations

Medalists
1st place, gold medalist(s)		Ekaterina Rumyantseva	Neutral Paralympic Athletes
2nd place, silver medalist(s)		Anna Milenina	Neutral Paralympic Athletes
3rd place, bronze medalist(s)		Liudmyla Liashenko	Ukraine

Women's 10 kilometres (sitting) at the XII Paralympic Winter Games
- Competitors: 13 from 6 nations

Medalists
1st place, gold medalist(s)		Andrea Eskau	Germany
2nd place, silver medalist(s)		Marta Zaynullina	Neutral Paralympic Athletes
3rd place, bronze medalist(s)		Irina Gulyayeva	Neutral Paralympic Athletes

The Women's 10 kilometres competition of the 2018 Winter Paralympics was held at Alpensia Biathlon Centre, South Korea. The competition took place on 13 March 2018.

== Medal table ==
Rank	Nation	Gold	Silver	Bronze	Total
1	Neutral Paralympic Athletes (NPA)	1	3	1	5
2	Germany (GER)	1	0	1	2
2	Ukraine (UKR)	1	0	1	2
Totals (3 entries)		3	3	3	9

== Visually impaired ==
In the biathlon visually impaired, the athlete with a visual impairment has a sighted guide. The two skiers are considered a team, and dual medals are awarded.

The race was started at 14:20.

Rank	Bib	Name	Country	Misses	Real time	Calculated Time	Diff
1st place, gold medalist(s)	105	Oksana Shyshkova; Guide: Vitaliy Kazakov	Ukraine	0 (0+0+0+0)	38:21.9	37:58.9	–
2nd place, silver medalist(s)	106	Mikhalina Lysova; Guide: Alexey Ivanov	Neutral Paralympic Athletes	1 (0+0+1+0)	40:36.8	40:12.4	+2:13.5
3rd place, bronze medalist(s)	104	Clara Klug; Guide: Martin Hartl	Germany	1 (0+0+0+1)	47:45.4	42:01.6	+4:02.7
4	103	Olha Prylutska; Guide: Borys Babar	Ukraine	4 (1+2+1+0)	42:41.4	42:15.8	+4:16.9
5	102	Marina Galitsyna; Guide: Maksim Pirogov	Neutral Paralympic Athletes	4 (1+1+2+0)	54:07.2	47:37.5	+9:38.6
	101	Ekaterina Moshkovskaia; Guide: Artem Norin	Neutral Paralympic Athletes	(5+4++)	DNF		

== Standing ==
The race was started at 12:30.

Rank	Bib	Name	Country	Misses	Real time	Calculated time	Diff
1st place, gold medalist(s)	52	Ekaterina Rumyantseva	Neutral Paralympic Athletes	1 (0+1+0+0)	38:49.6	34:10.0	–
2nd place, silver medalist(s)	50	Anna Milenina	Neutral Paralympic Athletes	2 (1+0+1+0)	36:58.7	35:30.0	+1:20.0
3rd place, bronze medalist(s)	51	Liudmyla Liashenko	Ukraine	2 (0+2+0+0)	37:54.6	36:23.6	+2:13.6
4	48	Iryna Bui	Ukraine	4 (0+2+0+2)	40:50.5	39:12.5	+5:02.5
5	44	Brittany Hudak	Canada	1 (0+0+0+1)	41:21.2	39:42.0	+5:32.0
6	43	Natalia Bratiuk	Neutral Paralympic Athletes	1 (0+1+0+0)	41:37.4	39:57.5	+5:47.5
7	47	Bohdana Konashuk	Ukraine	4 (2+0+1+1)	42:19.7	40:38.1	+6:28.1
8	42	Iweta Faron	Poland	5 (2+2+1+0)	44:08.8	42:22.8	+8:12.8
9	45	Momoko Dekijima	Japan	9 (2+1+2+4)	48:10.0	45:45.5	+11:35.5
10	41	Yuliya Mikheeva	Neutral Paralympic Athletes	5 (1+1+2+1)	48:36.5	46:39.8	+12:29.8
11	46	Yurika Abe	Japan	8 (2+1+1+4)	49:52.1	47:22.5	+13:12.5
	49	Iuliia Batenkova-Bauman	Ukraine	(0+3++)	DNF		

== Sitting ==
The race was started at 10:00.

Rank	Bib	Name	Country	Misses	Real time	Calculated Time	Difference
1st place, gold medalist(s)	12	Andrea Eskau	Germany	1 (0+0+1+0)	45:19.8	42:36.6	–
2nd place, silver medalist(s)	9	Marta Zaynullina	Neutral Paralympic Athletes	1 (0+0+1+0)	43:52.1	43:52.1	+1:15.5
3rd place, bronze medalist(s)	10	Irina Gulyayeva	Neutral Paralympic Athletes	5 (1+2+2+0)	44:25.5	44:25.5	+1:48.9
4	5	Kendall Gretsch	United States	3 (1+0+0+2)	46:28.5	44:37.0	+2:00.4
5	8	Lidziya Hrafeyeva	Belarus	4 (0+2+1+1)	45:55.7	45:55.7	+3:19.1
6	6	Natalia Kocherova	Neutral Paralympic Athletes	4 (0+1+3+0)	47:07.5	47:07.5	+4:30.9
7	7	Nadezhda Fedorova	Neutral Paralympic Athletes	9 (2+1+5+1)	47:21.5	47:21.5	+4:44.9
8	11	Anja Wicker	Germany	4 (1+1+0+2)	53:26.8	48:06.1	+5:29.5
9	2	Chu Beibei	China	6 (0+1+1+4)	50:56.8	50:56.8	+8:20.2
10	4	Akzhana Abdikarimova	Neutral Paralympic Athletes	5 (1+1+1+2)	58:25.1	52:34.6	+9:58.0
11	3	Lee Do-yeon	South Korea	7 (1+2+2+2)	53:51.1	53:51.1	+11:14.5
12	1	Nan Yuyu	China	7 (2+1+2+2)	57:34.7	54:07.4	+11:30.8
	13	Oksana Masters	United States	6 (1+2+1+2)	DNF		

== See also ==
- Biathlon at the 2018 Winter Olympics
