= Biathlon at the 2018 Winter Paralympics – Women's 12.5 kilometres =

Women's 12.5 kilometres at the XII Paralympic Winter Games
- Paralympic biathlon
- Venue: Alpensia Biathlon Centre, South Korea
- Dates: 16 March
- Competitors: 32 from 11 nations

Women's 12.5 kilometres (visually impaired) at the XII Paralympic Winter Games
- Competitors: 5 from 3 nations

Medalists
| 1st place, gold medalist(s) | | Mikhalina Lysova; Guide: Alexey Ivanov | Neutral Paralympic Athletes |
| 2nd place, silver medalist(s) | | Oksana Shyshkova; Guide: Vitaliy Kazakov | Ukraine |
| 3rd place, bronze medalist(s) | | Clara Klug; Guide: Martin Hartl | Germany |

Women's 12.5 kilometres (standing) at the XII Paralympic Winter Games
- Competitors: 12 from 5 nations

Medalists
| 1st place, gold medalist(s) | | Anna Milenina | Neutral Paralympic Athletes |
| 2nd place, silver medalist(s) | | Ekaterina Rumyantseva | Neutral Paralympic Athletes |
| 3rd place, bronze medalist(s) | | Brittany Hudak | Canada |

Women's 12.5 kilometres (sitting) at the XII Paralympic Winter Games
- Competitors: 15 from 8 nations

Medalists
| 1st place, gold medalist(s) | | Andrea Eskau | Germany |
| 2nd place, silver medalist(s) | | Oksana Masters | United States |
| 3rd place, bronze medalist(s) | | Lidziya Hrafeyeva | Belarus |

The Women's 12.5 kilometres competition of the 2018 Winter Paralympics was held at Alpensia Biathlon Centre, South Korea. The competition took place on 16 March 2018.

== Medal table ==
| Rank | Nation | Gold | Silver | Bronze | Total |
|---|---|---|---|---|---|
| 1 | Neutral Paralympic Athletes (NPA) | 2 | 1 | 0 | 3 |
| 2 | Germany (GER) | 1 | 0 | 1 | 2 |
| 3 | Ukraine (UKR) | 0 | 1 | 0 | 1 |
| 3 | United States (USA) | 0 | 1 | 0 | 1 |
| 5 | Belarus (BLR) | 0 | 0 | 1 | 1 |
| 5 | Canada (CAN) | 0 | 0 | 1 | 1 |
| Totals (6 entries) | | 3 | 3 | 3 | 9 |

== Visually impaired ==
In the biathlon visually impaired, the athlete with a visual impairment has a sighted guide. The two skiers are considered a team, and dual medals are awarded.

The race was started at 14:40.

| Rank | Bib | Name | Country | Misses | Real time | Calculated time | Result | Diff |
|---|---|---|---|---|---|---|---|---|
| 1st place, gold medalist(s) | 105 | Mikhalina Lysova; Guide: Alexey Ivanov | Neutral Paralympic Athletes | 0 (0+0+0+0) | 38:05.5 | 37:42.6 | 37:42.6 | – |
| 2nd place, silver medalist(s) | 104 | Oksana Shyshkova; Guide: Vitaliy Kazakov | Ukraine | 1 (0+0+0+1) | 39:55.0 | 39:31.1 | 40:31.1 | +2:48.5 |
| 3rd place, bronze medalist(s) | 103 | Clara Klug; Guide: Martin Hartl | Germany | 0 (0+0+0+0) | 46:42.2 | 41:05.9 | 41:05.9 | +3:23.3 |
| 4 | 102 | Olha Prylutska; Guide: Borys Babar | Ukraine | 3 (2+1+0+0) | 40:15.4 | 39:51.2 | 42:51.2 | +5:08.6 |
| 5 | 101 | Ekaterina Moshkovskaia; Guide: Artem Norin | Neutral Paralympic Athletes | 12 (3+3+4+2) | 44:48.4 | 44:21.5 | 56:21.5 | +18:38.9 |

== Standing ==
The race was started at 12:00.

| Rank | Bib | Name | Country | Misses | Real time | Calculated time | Result | Diff |
|---|---|---|---|---|---|---|---|---|
| 1st place, gold medalist(s) | 50 | Anna Milenina | Neutral Paralympic Athletes | 2 (0+1+0+1) | 38:29.2 | 36:56.8 | 38:56.8 | – |
| 2nd place, silver medalist(s) | 52 | Ekaterina Rumyantseva | Neutral Paralympic Athletes | 2 (0+2+0+0) | 42:03.4 | 37:00.6 | 39:00.6 | +3.8 |
| 3rd place, bronze medalist(s) | 45 | Brittany Hudak | Canada | 0 (0+0+0+0) | 43:04.1 | 41:20.7 | 41:20.7 | +2:23.9 |
| 4 | 48 | Iryna Bui | Ukraine | 0 (0+0+0+0) | 43:07.9 | 41:24.4 | 41:24.4 | +2:27.6 |
| 5 | 47 | Bohdana Konashuk | Ukraine | 1 (0+0+0+1) | 43:11.1 | 41:27.5 | 42:27.5 | +3:30.7 |
| 6 | 43 | Natalia Bratiuk | Neutral Paralympic Athletes | 2 (1+0+0+1) | 42:50.7 | 41:07.9 | 43:07.9 | +4:11.1 |
| 7 | 44 | Emily Young | Canada | 2 (1+0+1+0) | 43:28.9 | 41:18.5 | 43:18.5 | +4:21.7 |
| 8 | 41 | Yuliya Mikheeva | Neutral Paralympic Athletes | 2 (0+1+0+1) | 45:28.6 | 43:39.5 | 45:39.5 | +6:42.7 |
| 9 | 46 | Momoko Dekijima | Japan | 5 (1+2+0+2) | 43:11.0 | 41:01.5 | 46:01.5 | +7:04.7 |
| 10 | 51 | Liudmyla Liashenko | Ukraine | 6 (3+3+0+0) | 41:51.9 | 40:11.4 | 46:11.4 | +7:14.6 |
| 11 | 49 | Iuliia Batenkova-Bauman | Ukraine | 3 (1+0+2+0) | 45:35.1 | 43:18.3 | 46:18.3 | +7:21.5 |
| 12 | 42 | Iweta Faron | Poland | 9 (4+1+2+2) | 43:57.4 | 42:11.9 | 51:11.9 | +12:15.1 |

== Sitting ==
The race was started at 10:00.

| Rank | Bib | Name | Country | Misses | Real time | Calculated time | Result | Diff |
|---|---|---|---|---|---|---|---|---|
| 1st place, gold medalist(s) | 14 | Andrea Eskau | Germany | 0 (0+0+0+0) | 52:51.5 | 49:41.2 | 49:41.2 | – |
| 2nd place, silver medalist(s) | 15 | Oksana Masters | United States | 0 (0+0+0+0) | 50:00.0 | 50:00.0 | 50:00.0 | +18.8 |
| 3rd place, bronze medalist(s) | 10 | Lidziya Hrafeyeva | Belarus | 1 (0+1+0+0) | 49:57.0 | 49:57.0 | 50:57.0 | +1:15.8 |
| 4 | 9 | Natalia Kocherova | Neutral Paralympic Athletes | 1 (0+0+1+0) | 50:53.1 | 50:53.1 | 51:53.1 | +2:11.9 |
| 5 | 12 | Irina Gulyayeva | Neutral Paralympic Athletes | 3 (0+2+1+0) | 49:15.5 | 49:15.5 | 52:15.5 | +2:34.3 |
| 6 | 11 | Marta Zaynullina | Neutral Paralympic Athletes | 6 (1+1+2+2) | 49:39.6 | 49:39.6 | 55:39.6 | +5:58.4 |
| 7 | 7 | Maria Iovleva | Neutral Paralympic Athletes | 5 (2+1+1+1) | 52:12.2 | 52:12.2 | 57:12.2 | +7:31.0 |
| 8 | 8 | Kendall Gretsch | United States | 7 (1+0+2+4) | 52:59.2 | 50:52.0 | 57:52.0 | +8:10.8 |
| 9 | 13 | Anja Wicker | Germany | 3 (0+0+3+0) | 1:01:23.3 | 55:15.0 | 58:15.0 | +8:33.8 |
| 10 | 6 | Akzhana Abdikarimova | Neutral Paralympic Athletes | 4 (0+1+2+1) | 1:02:50.9 | 56:33.8 | 1:00:33.8 | +10:52.6 |
| 11 | 4 | Lee Do-yeon | South Korea | 5 (3+1+0+1) | 57:27.3 | 57:27.3 | 1:02:27.3 | +12:46.1 |
| 12 | 2 | Chu Beibei | China | 8 (2+4+1+1) | 54:30.9 | 54:30.9 | 1:02:30.9 | +12:49.7 |
| 13 | 3 | Nonno Nitta | Japan | 1 (0+0+1+0) | 1:12:01.1 | 1:04:49.0 | 1:05:49.0 | +16:07.8 |
| 14 | 5 | Sini Pyy | Finland | 7 (2+1+2+2) | 1:03:24.1 | 59:35.9 | 1:06:35.9 | +16:54.7 |
| 15 | 1 | Nan Yuyu | China | 10 (2+2+3+3) | 1:01:06.6 | 57:26.6 | 1:07:26.6 | +17:45.4 |

== See also ==
- Biathlon at the 2018 Winter Olympics
