= China at the 2018 Winter Paralympics =

- IPC code: CHN
- NPC: China Administration of Sports for Persons with Disabilities
- Website: www.caspd.org.cn

in PyeongChang
- Competitors: 26 in 5 sports
- Flag bearer: Peng Yuanyuan (opening)
- Medals Ranked 20th: Gold 1 Silver 0 Bronze 0 Total 1

Winter Paralympics appearances (overview)
- 2002; 2006; 2010; 2014; 2018; 2022; 2026

China competed at the 2018 Winter Paralympics in Pyeongchang, South Korea, held between 9–18 March 2018. With Beijing being the host of the 2022 Winter Paralympics, a Chinese segment was performed at the closing ceremony. China won 1 medal in total.

On 17 March, Wang Haitao, Chen Jianxin, Liu Wei, Wang Meng and Zhang Qiang won the first Winter Paralympics medal for China with gold in wheelchair curling.

== Medalists ==
| Medal | Name | Sport | Event | Date |
|---|---|---|---|---|
| Gold | Wang Haitao; Chen Jianxin; Liu Wei; Wang Meng; Zhang Qiang | Wheelchair curling | Wheelchair curling | 17 March |

== Competitors ==
The following is the list of number of competitors participating at the Games per sport/discipline.

| Sport | Men | Women | Total |
|---|---|---|---|
| Alpine skiing | 0 | 1 | 1 |
| Biathlon / Cross-country skiing | 12 | 4 | 16 |
| Snowboarding | 4 | 0 | 4 |
| Wheelchair curling | 4 | 1 | 5 |
| Total | 20 | 6 | 26 |

== Alpine skiing ==
China qualified one female alpine skier.

Women

| Athlete | Event | Run 1 | | | Run 2 | | | Final/Total | | |
| Athlete | Event | Time | Diff | Rank | Time | Diff | Rank | Time | Diff | Rank |
|---|---|---|---|---|---|---|---|---|---|---|
| Liu Sitong | Women's giant slalom, sitting | 1:26.75 | +13.28 | 10 | 1:20.24 | +7.18 | 9 | 2:46.99 | +20.46 | 9 |
| Liu Sitong | Women's slalom, sitting | 1:14.10 | +18.74 | 9 | 1:31.04 | +30.58 | 6 | 2:45.14 | +49.32 | 6 |

== Biathlon ==
China qualified two female and three male biathletes.

Men

| Athlete | Event | Results | Missed Shots | Rank |
|---|---|---|---|---|
| Du Mingyuan | Men's 7.5 kilometres, sitting | 26:36.6 | 4 (2+2) | 14 |
| Du Mingyuan | Men's 12.5 kilometres, sitting | DNF | | |
| Du Mingyuan | Men's 15 kilometres, sitting | 1:06:07.9 | 13 (4+3+4+2) | 17 |
| Gao Xiaoming | Men's 7.5 kilometres, sitting | 26:26.2 | 4 (1+3) | 13 |
| Gao Xiaoming | Men's 12.5 kilometres, sitting | 51:51.6 | 3 (1+1+1+0) | 10 |
| Gao Xiaoming | Men's 15 kilometres, sitting | 1:00:41.4 | 7 (3+0+1+3) | 16 |
| Wu Junbao | Men's 7.5 kilometres, standing | 20:24.4 | 1 (0+1) | 8 |
| Wu Junbao | Men's 12.5 kilometres, standing | 44:48.8 | 4 (1+0+0+3) | 13 |
| Wu Junbao | Men's 15 kilometres, standing | 51:08.8 | 2 (0+0+1+1) | 10 |

Women

| Athlete | Event | Results | Missed Shots | Rank |
|---|---|---|---|---|
| Chu Beibei | Women's 6 kilometres, sitting | 24:23.4 | 2 (1+1) | 8 |
| Chu Beibei | Women's 10 kilometres, sitting | 50:56.8 | 6 (0+1+1+4) | 9 |
| Chu Beibei | Women's 12.5 kilometres, sitting | 1:02:30.9 | 8 (2+4+1+1) | 12 |
| Nan Yuyu | Women's 6 kilometres, sitting | 28:15.6 | 6 (2+4) | 15 |
| Nan Yuyu | Women's 10 kilometres, sitting | 54:07.4 | 7 (2+1+2+2) | 12 |
| Nan Yuyu | Women's 12.5 kilometres, sitting | 1:07:26.6 | 10 (2+2+3+3) | 15 |

== Cross-country skiing ==
China qualified twelve male and four female cross-country skiers.

Men

| Athlete | Event | Qualification | | | Semifinal | | | Final | | |
| Athlete | Event | Real time | Calculated time | Rank | Real time | Calculated time | Rank | Real time | Calculated time | Rank |
|---|---|---|---|---|---|---|---|---|---|---|
| Du Haitao | Men's 1.5 km sprint classical, standing | 4:56.03 | 3:56.82 | 12 Q | —N/a | 5:29.8 | 6 | did not advance | | |
| Du Haitao | Men's 10 km classical, standing | —N/a | | | | | | 34:38.7 | 27:43.0 | 17 |
| Du Haitao | Men's 20 km free, standing | —N/a | | | | | | 1:01:59.4 | 54:33.1 | 13 |
| Du Mingyuan | Men's 1.1 km sprint classical, sitting | 3:30.89 | 3:30.89 | 24 | did not advance | | | | | |
| Du Mingyuan | Men's 7.5 km classical, sitting | —N/a | | | | | | 25:55.9 | 25:55.9 | 18 |
| Gao Xiaoming | Men's 7.5 km classical, sitting | —N/a | | | | | | 26:09.3 | 26:09.3 | 21 |
| Gao Xiaoming | Men's 15 km free, sitting | —N/a | | | | | | 45:36.8 | 45:36.8 | 14 |
| Huang Bitao | Men's 1.1 km sprint classical, sitting | 3:28.70 | 3:28.70 | 20 | did not advance | | | | | |
| Huang Bitao | Men's 7.5 km classical, sitting | —N/a | | | | | | 27:13.9 | 27:13.9 | 24 |
| Huang Bitao | Men's 15 km free, sitting | —N/a | | | | | | 45:56.0 | 45:56.0 | 16 |
| Huang Feixiang | Men's 1.1 km sprint classical, sitting | 3:21.75 | 3:21.75 | 18 | did not advance | | | | | |
| Huang Feixiang | Men's 7.5 km classical, sitting | —N/a | | | | | | 25:45.6 | 25:45.6 | 17 |
| Huang Feixiang | Men's 15 km free, sitting | —N/a | | | | | | 47:30.0 | 47:30.0 | 19 |
| Lu Jingfeng | Men's 1.1 km sprint classical, sitting | 4:06.55 | 3:41.90 | 26 | did not advance | | | | | |
| Lu Jingfeng | Men's 7.5 km classical, sitting | —N/a | | | | | | 30:29.1 | 27:26.2 | 25 |
| Ma Mingtao | Men's 1.5 km sprint classical, standing | 5:00.73 | 4:00.58 | 15 | did not advance | | | | | |
| Ma Mingtao | Men's 10 km classical, standing | —N/a | | | | | | 31:56.3 | 25:33.0 | 8 |
| Ma Mingtao | Men's 20 km free, standing | —N/a | | | | | | 57:59.1 | 51:01.6 | 10 |
| Wang Chenyang | Men's 1.5 km sprint classical, standing | 5:41.58 | 4:33.26 | 22 | did not advance | | | | | |
| Wang Chenyang | Men's 10 km classical, standing | —N/a | | | | | | 41:26.8 | 33:09.4 | 23 |
| Wang Chenyang | Men's 20 km free, standing | —N/a | | | | | | 58:26.3 | 51:25.5 | 11 |
| Wang Quan | Men's 1.1 km sprint classical, sitting | 4:04.05 | 3:29.88 | 21 | did not advance | | | | | |
| Wu Junbao | Men's 1.5 km sprint classical, standing | 5:13.19 | 4:10.55 | 17 | did not advance | | | | | |
| Wu Junbao | Men's 20 km free, standing | —N/a | | | | | | 1:02:40.2 | 55:09.0 | 15 |
| Xu Congjun | Men's 7.5 km classical, sitting | —N/a | | | | | | 31:51.1 | 28:40.0 | 27 |
| Xu Congjun | Men's 15 km free, sitting | —N/a | | | | | | 53:18.0 | 47:58.2 | 20 |
| Zheng Peng | Men's 1.1 km sprint classical, sitting | 3:42.34 | 3:11.21 | 7 Q | —N/a | 3:52.1 | 5 | did not advance | | |
| Zheng Peng | Men's 7.5 km classical, sitting | —N/a | | | | | | 30:11.6 | 25:58.0 | 19 |
| Zheng Peng | Men's 15 km free, sitting | —N/a | | | | | | 49:42.2 | 42:44.7 | 4 |

Women

| Athlete | Event | Qualification | | | Semifinal | | | Final | | |
| Athlete | Event | Real time | Calculated time | Rank | Real time | Calculated time | Rank | Real time | Calculated time | Rank |
|---|---|---|---|---|---|---|---|---|---|---|
| Chu Beibei | Women's 1.1 km sprint classical, sitting | 3:54.23 | 3:54.23 | 12 Q | —N/a | 4:42.8 | 5 | did not advance | | |
| Chu Beibei | Women's 5 km classical, sitting | —N/a | | | | | | 19:00.0 | 19:00.0 | 10 |
| Chu Beibei | Women's 12 km free, sitting | —N/a | | | | | | 42:26.7 | 42:26.7 | 9 |
| Jin Yawei | Women's 1.1 km sprint classical, sitting | 4:26.92 | 3:49.55 | 9 Q | —N/a | 4:47.6 | 6 | did not advance | | |
| Jin Yawei | Women's 5 km classical, sitting | —N/a | | | | | | 22:29.7 | 19:20.7 | 11 |
| Jin Yawei | Women's 12 km free, sitting | —N/a | | | | | | 48:42.5 | 41:53.4 | 8 |
| Nan Yuyu | Women's 12 km free, sitting | —N/a | | | | | | 48:45.1 | 45:49.6 | 13 |
| Peng Yuanyuan | Women's 1.5 km sprint classical, standing | 5:30.68 | 5:00.92 | 15 | did not advance | | | | | |
| Peng Yuanyuan | Women's 7.5 km classical, standing | —N/a | | | | | | 29:02.2 | 26:25.4 | 15 |
| Peng Yuanyuan | Women's 15 km free, standing | —N/a | | | | | | 1:10:22.3 | 1:07:33.4 | 9 |

== Snowboarding ==
Slalom

| Athlete | Event | Run 1 | Run 2 | Run 3 | Best | Rank |
|---|---|---|---|---|---|---|
| Liu Gengliang | Men's Banked Slalom SB-LL2 | 57.89 | 1:05.57 | 58.32 | 57.89 | 14 |
| Sun Qi | Men's Banked Slalom SB-LL2 | 59.58 | 1:05.06 | 53.66 | 53.66 | 11 |
| Chen Zhuo | Men's Banked Slalom SB-UL | 1:25.76 | DSQ | 57.49 | 57.49 | 13 |
| Jiang Zihao | Men's Banked Slalom SB-UL | 1:00.56 | 56.77 | 1:20.55 | 56.77 | 9 |

Snowboard cross

| Athlete | Event | Qualification | | | | | 1/8 finals | Quarterfinals | Semifinals | Final | |
| Athlete | Event | Race 1 | | Race 2 | | Seed | 1/8 finals | Quarterfinals | Semifinals | Final | |
| Athlete | Event | Time | Rank | Time | Rank | Seed | Opponent Result | Opponent Result | Opponent Result | Opponent Result | Rank |
|---|---|---|---|---|---|---|---|---|---|---|---|
| Liu Gengliang | Men's snowboard cross SB-LL2 | 1:04.91 | 13 | 1:04.19 | 11 | 13 | Gabel (USA); L | did not advance | | | |
| Sun Qi | Men's snowboard cross SB-LL2 | 1:01.77 | 8 | 1:01.69 | 9 | 11 | Strong (USA); L | did not advance | | | |
| Chen Zhuo | Men's snowboard cross SB-UL | 1:06.03 | 10 | 1:05.58 | 10 | 12 | Pozzerle (ITA); L | did not advance | | | |
| Jiang Zihao | Men's snowboard cross SB-UL | 1:09.35 | 18 | 1:05.44 | 9 | 11 | Barnes-Miller (GBR); L | did not advance | | | |

== Wheelchair curling ==
Summary

| Team | Event | Group stage | | | | | | | | | | | | Tiebreaker | Semifinal | Final / BM | |
| Team | Event | Opposition Score | Opposition Score | Opposition Score | Opposition Score | Opposition Score | Opposition Score | Opposition Score | Opposition Score | Opposition Score | Opposition Score | Opposition Score | Rank | Opposition Score | Opposition Score | Opposition Score | Rank |
|---|---|---|---|---|---|---|---|---|---|---|---|---|---|---|---|---|---|
| Wang Haitao; Chen Jianxin; Liu Wei; Wang Meng; Zhang Qiang | Mixed | (Sweden) SWE; W 9–4 | (Norway) NOR; W 10–1 | (Germany) GER; W 7–3 | (Finland) FIN; W 6–4 | (Switzerland) SUI; W 8–2 | (Canada) CAN; L 5–8 | (United States) USA; W 6–4 | (Slovakia) SVK; W 9–2 | (International Paralympic Committee) NPA; W 10–4 | (South Korea) KOR; L 6–7 | (United Kingdom) GBR; W 9–3 | 3 Q | —N/a | (Canada) CAN; W 4–3 | (Norway) NOR; W 6–5 | 1st place, gold medalist(s) |

| Pos | Team | Pld | W | L | PF | PA | PD | PCT | Ends Won | Ends Lost | Blank Ends | Stolen Ends | Shot % | Qualification |
|---|---|---|---|---|---|---|---|---|---|---|---|---|---|---|
| 1 | South Korea | 11 | 9 | 2 | 65 | 51 | 14 | 0.818 | 38 | 36 | 9 | 11 | 66% | Advance to playoffs |
| 2 | Canada | 11 | 9 | 2 | 74 | 45 | 29 | 0.818 | 47 | 28 | 6 | 27 | 62% | Advance to playoffs |
| 3 | China | 11 | 9 | 2 | 85 | 42 | 43 | 0.818 | 43 | 32 | 2 | 16 | 67% | Advance to playoffs |
| 4 | Norway | 11 | 7 | 4 | 55 | 57 | −2 | 0.636 | 41 | 35 | 5 | 15 | 58% | Advance to playoffs |
| 5 | Neutral Paralympic Athletes | 11 | 5 | 6 | 61 | 63 | −2 | 0.455 | 44 | 37 | 2 | 23 | 62% | |
| 6 | Switzerland | 11 | 5 | 6 | 56 | 63 | −7 | 0.455 | 36 | 45 | 2 | 11 | 61% | |
| 7 | Great Britain | 11 | 5 | 6 | 57 | 53 | 4 | 0.455 | 41 | 41 | 6 | 20 | 62% | |
| 8 | Germany | 11 | 5 | 6 | 57 | 68 | −11 | 0.455 | 37 | 39 | 5 | 16 | 54% | |
| 9 | Slovakia | 11 | 4 | 7 | 62 | 72 | −10 | 0.364 | 39 | 46 | 1 | 11 | 57% | |
| 10 | Sweden | 11 | 4 | 7 | 47 | 66 | −19 | 0.364 | 29 | 45 | 8 | 8 | 57% | |
| 11 | Finland | 11 | 2 | 9 | 53 | 87 | −34 | 0.182 | 35 | 46 | 1 | 11 | 51% | |
| 12 | United States | 11 | 2 | 9 | 58 | 63 | −5 | 0.182 | 37 | 45 | 3 | 12 | 60% | |

Source: Paralympic.org

Round-robin

China has a bye in draws 1, 3, 8, 11, 13 and 15.

Draw 2

Saturday, 10 March, 19:35

| Sheet A | 1 | 2 | 3 | 4 | 5 | 6 | 7 | 8 | Final |
| Sweden (Petersson Dahl) | 0 | 0 | 1 | 0 | 1 | 0 | 2 | X | 4 |
| China (Wang) 🔨 | 1 | 3 | 0 | 1 | 0 | 4 | 0 | X | 9 |

Draw 4

Sunday, 11 March, 14:35

| Sheet B | 1 | 2 | 3 | 4 | 5 | 6 | 7 | 8 | Final |
| Norway (Lorentsen) 🔨 | 0 | 1 | 0 | 0 | 0 | 0 | X | X | 1 |
| China (Wang) | 2 | 0 | 2 | 2 | 2 | 2 | X | X | 10 |

Draw 5

Sunday, 11 March, 19:35

| Sheet C | 1 | 2 | 3 | 4 | 5 | 6 | 7 | 8 | Final |
| China (Wang) 🔨 | 2 | 0 | 0 | 0 | 4 | 1 | 0 | X | 7 |
| Germany (Putzich) | 0 | 0 | 1 | 1 | 0 | 0 | 1 | X | 3 |

Draw 6

Monday, 12 March, 09:35

| Sheet D | 1 | 2 | 3 | 4 | 5 | 6 | 7 | 8 | Final |
| Finland (S. Karjalainen) 🔨 | 0 | 0 | 1 | 0 | 2 | 0 | 1 | X | 4 |
| China (Wang) | 1 | 2 | 0 | 2 | 0 | 1 | 0 | X | 6 |

Draw 7

Monday, 12 March, 14:35

| Sheet B | 1 | 2 | 3 | 4 | 5 | 6 | 7 | 8 | Final |
| China (Wang) 🔨 | 1 | 0 | 1 | 0 | 1 | 3 | 2 | X | 8 |
| Switzerland (Wagner) | 0 | 1 | 0 | 1 | 0 | 0 | 0 | X | 2 |

Draw 9

Tuesday, 13 March, 09:35

| Sheet D | 1 | 2 | 3 | 4 | 5 | 6 | 7 | 8 | Final |
| China (Wang) 🔨 | 1 | 1 | 0 | 3 | 0 | 0 | 0 | X | 5 |
| Canada (Ideson) | 0 | 0 | 1 | 0 | 2 | 4 | 1 | X | 8 |

Draw 10

Tuesday, 13 March, 14:35

| Sheet A | 1 | 2 | 3 | 4 | 5 | 6 | 7 | 8 | Final |
| United States (Black) | 0 | 1 | 1 | 0 | 1 | 0 | 1 | 0 | 4 |
| China (Wang) 🔨 | 1 | 0 | 0 | 1 | 0 | 2 | 0 | 2 | 6 |

Draw 12

Wednesday, 14 March, 9:35

| Sheet C | 1 | 2 | 3 | 4 | 5 | 6 | 7 | 8 | Final |
| Slovakia (Ďuriš) 🔨 | 0 | 1 | 0 | 0 | 1 | 0 | 0 | X | 2 |
| China (Wang) | 2 | 0 | 2 | 1 | 0 | 1 | 3 | X | 9 |

Draw 14

Wednesday, 14 March, 19:35

| Sheet A | 1 | 2 | 3 | 4 | 5 | 6 | 7 | 8 | Final |
| China (Wang) 🔨 | 3 | 0 | 0 | 3 | 0 | 3 | 1 | X | 10 |
| Neutral Paralympic Athletes (Kurokhtin) | 0 | 1 | 2 | 0 | 1 | 0 | 0 | X | 4 |

Draw 16

Thursday, 15 March, 14:35

| Sheet B | 1 | 2 | 3 | 4 | 5 | 6 | 7 | 8 | Final |
| China (Wang) | 0 | 1 | 0 | 4 | 0 | 0 | 1 | 0 | 6 |
| South Korea (Seo) 🔨 | 2 | 0 | 1 | 0 | 1 | 2 | 0 | 1 | 7 |

Draw 17

Thursday, 15 March, 19:35

| Sheet C | 1 | 2 | 3 | 4 | 5 | 6 | 7 | 8 | Final |
| China (Wang) | 0 | 2 | 0 | 2 | 0 | 5 | X | X | 9 |
| Great Britain (Neilson) 🔨 | 1 | 0 | 0 | 0 | 2 | 0 | X | X | 3 |

Semifinal

Friday, 16 March, 15:35

| Sheet A | 1 | 2 | 3 | 4 | 5 | 6 | 7 | 8 | Final |
| China (Wang) 🔨 | 0 | 1 | 0 | 2 | 0 | 0 | 0 | 1 | 4 |
| Canada (Ideson) | 0 | 0 | 1 | 0 | 2 | 0 | 0 | 0 | 3 |

Final

Saturday, 17 March, 14:35

| Sheet B | 1 | 2 | 3 | 4 | 5 | 6 | 7 | 8 | EE | Final |
| China (Wang) 🔨 | 2 | 0 | 0 | 1 | 0 | 0 | 2 | 0 | 1 | 6 |
| Norway (Lorentsen) | 0 | 1 | 2 | 0 | 0 | 1 | 0 | 1 | 0 | 5 |

== See also ==
- China at the 2018 Winter Olympics
