= Mikhalina Lysova =

Russian Para cross-country skier and biathlete (born 1992)

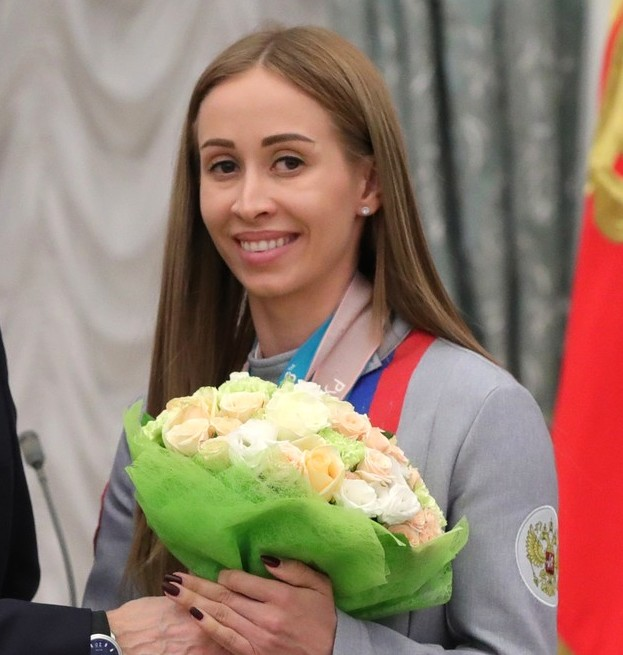
- Lysova in 2018

Personal information
- Full name: Mikhalina Anatoljevna Lysova
- Nationality: Russian
- Born: 29 March 1992 (age 34) Nizhny Tagil, Sverdlovsk Oblast
- Years active: 2002 – present
- Spouse: Dmytro Shulga

Sport
- Country: Russia
- Sport: Para Nordic skiing (Para cross-country skiing and Para biathlon)
- Disability class: B3
Medal record
Event	1st	2nd	3rd
Paralympics	6	7	3
World Championships	10	4	2
Total	16	11	5
Women's para biathlon
Winter Paralympics
Representing Russia
Gold medal – first place	2014 Sochi	6km individual
Gold medal – first place	2014 Sochi	10km middle
Silver medal – second place	2014 Sochi	12.5km individual
Bronze medal – third place	2010 Vancouver	3km pursuit
Bronze medal – third place	2010 Vancouver	12.5km individual
Representing the Neutral Paralympic Athletes
Gold medal – first place	2018 Pyeongchang	6km individual
Gold medal – first place	2018 Pyeongchang	12.5km individual
Silver medal – second place	2018 Pyeongchang	10km individual
World Championships
Representing Russia
Gold medal – first place	2011 Khanty-Mansiysk	3km pursuit
Gold medal – first place	2011 Khanty-Mansiysk	12.5km
Gold medal – first place	2013 Solleftea	6km
Gold medal – first place	2013 Solleftea	10km
Gold medal – first place	2013 Solleftea	12.5km
Silver medal – second place	2011 Khanty-Mansiysk	7.5km
Women's para cross-country skiing
Winter Paralympics
Representing Russia
Gold medal – first place	2010 Vancouver	3 x 2.5 km relay open
Gold medal – first place	2014 Sochi	1km sprint freestyle
Silver medal – second place	2010 Vancouver	5km classic style
Silver medal – second place	2010 Vancouver	1km sprint classic
Silver medal – second place	2014 Sochi	15km classic style
Silver medal – second place	2014 Sochi	5km freestyle
Representing the Neutral Paralympic Athletes
Silver medal – second place	2018 Pyeongchang	1.5km sprint
Bronze medal – third place	2018 Pyeongchang	15km freestyle
World Championships
Representing Russia
Gold medal – first place	2011 Khanty-Mansiysk	1km sprint freestyle
Gold medal – first place	2011 Khanty-Mansiysk	3 x 2.5 km relay open
Gold medal – first place	2013 Solleftea	1km sprint classic
Gold medal – first place	2013 Solleftea	5km classic
Gold medal – first place	2013 Solleftea	4 x 2.5 km mixed relay
Silver medal – second place	2009 Vuokatti	1km sprint
Silver medal – second place	2011 Khanty-Mansiysk	5km freestyle
Silver medal – second place	2011 Khanty-Mansiysk	15km classic
Bronze medal – third place	2009 Vuokatti	15km classic
Bronze medal – third place	2013 Solleftea	15km freestyle

Mikhalina Anatolyevna Lysova (Russian: Михалина Анатольевна Лысова; born 29 March 1992) is a Russian visually impaired Para cross-country skier and biathlete. She has represented Russia at the Paralympics in 2010 and in 2014 competing in the cross-country skiing and biathlon events. She progressed to become one of the most consistent Paralympics Nordic skiers of Russia as she claimed 16 medals in her Paralympic career including 6 gold medals. She was also the recipient of the Order ''For Merit to the Fatherland'' and Order of Friendship awards.

== Early life ==
Mikhalina Lysova was born on 29 March 1992 and had a weak vision since her birth. Her father worked as a fitter and her mother worked in a kindergarten. She was encouraged to take the sport of skiing by her elder sister, Aleksandra Lysova, in 2002 when she was just ten years old though her parents did not like it. She was married to a Ukrainian Para Nordic skier, Dmytro Shulga, who has represented Ukraine at the Paralympics in 2010 and 2014.

== Career ==
Lysova made her first Paralympic appearance during the 2010 Winter Paralympics representing Russia and had a successful Paralympic event claiming 5 medals in her debut Paralympic event including a gold medal and 2 silver medals in the cross-country skiing events and 2 bronze medals in the biathlon events. She was awarded the IPC Athlete of the Month for April in 2011 due to consistent performances at the 2011 IPC Biathlon and Cross-Country Skiing World Championships as she claimed 7 medals in the World Championships.

She was also qualified to compete at the 2014 Winter Paralympics which was held in Russia and claimed 6 medals in the Paralympic event including 2 gold, 1 silver medals in the biathlon events and 1 gold, 2 silver medals in the cross-country skiing events. Mikhalina Lysova was also the flagbearer for Russia at the closing ceremony during the 2014 Winter Paralympics.

She represented Neutral Paralympic Athletes at the 2018 Winter Paralympics as Russia was suspended and banned from competing at the 2018 Winter Paralympics due to doping scandal. Mikhalina Lysova claimed her 5th Paralympic gold medal after clinched a gold medal in the women's 6km individual event during the 2018 Winter Paralympics, which is also her third gold Paralympic gold medal in biathlon events.

== Defamation lawsuit ==
In April 2018 after the conclusion of the 2018 Winter Paralympics on 18 March 2018, a German daily newspaper called Bild, falsely claimed Mikhalina Lysova for doping by blaming her for being indifferent to fellow Russian athletes who have been caught for doping issues and also filed a complaint against her at a court. The newspaper also believed that Mikhalina would have used banned substances to boost her performance at the 2018 Winter Paralympics where she managed to pick up 5 medals. However, Mikhalina Lysova managed to prove herself as an honest and innocent person after winning the court case against the German newspaper.
