= Ekaterina Rumyantseva =

Russian biathlete and cross-country skier

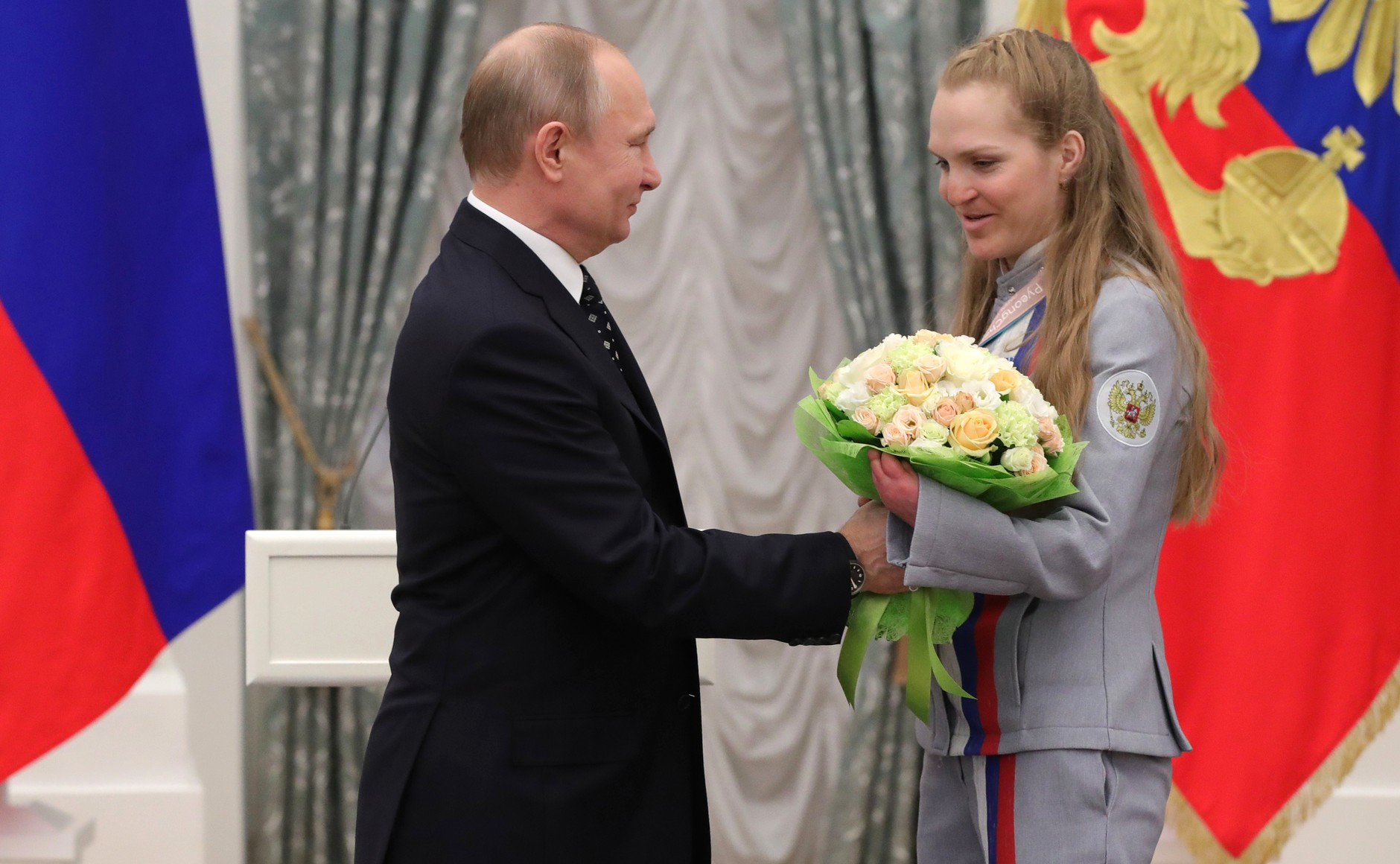
- Vladimir Putin, the Russian President (on the left) congratulates Ekaterina Rumyantseva (on the right) after her medal success

Personal information
- Nickname: Katya
- Nationality: Russian
- Born: 28 January 1991 (age 35)

Sport
- Country: Russia
- Sport: Paralympic Nordic skiing (Paralympic cross-country skiing and Paralympic biathlon)
- Disability class: LW5/7
Medal record
Representing Russia
Women's para biathlon
World Championships
Bronze medal – third place	2015 Cable	15km freestyle standing
Representing the Neutral Paralympic Athletes
Winter Paralympics
Women's para biathlon
Gold medal – first place	2018 Pyeongchang	6km standing
Gold medal – first place	2018 Pyeongchang	10km standing
Silver medal – second place	2018 Pyeongchang	12.5km standing
Women's para cross-country skiing
Gold medal – first place	2018 Pyeongchang	15km freestyle standing

Ekaterina Rumyantseva (born 28 January 1991) is a Russian biathlete and cross-country skier. She represented the Neutral Paralympic Athletes at the 2018 Winter Paralympics, which is also her first Paralympic competition.

Ekaterina clinched a gold medal in the women's 6km standing event at the 2018 Winter Paralympics, while the silver medal was claimed by her fellow Russian compatriot Anna Milenina in the relevant event, who also competed under the Neutral Paralympic flag.

In 2018, she was named "Disabled Female Athlete of the Year" in the nomination "Overcoming" by the Ministry of Sport of Russia. She was also named the International Sports Prize World Athlete of the Year award in 2018.
