= Andrea Eskau =

German sportwoman (born 1971)

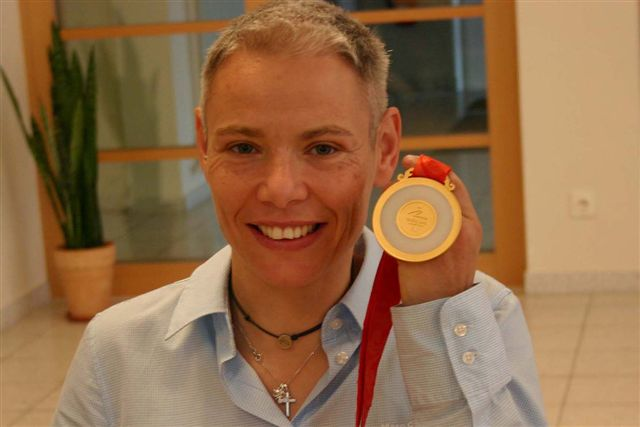
- Eskau with the gold medal

Personal information
- Born: 21 March 1971 (age 55) Apolda, East Germany
Medal record
Representing Germany
Women's para cycling
Summer Paralympic Games
Gold medal – first place	2008 Beijing	Road race, HC A/B/C
Gold medal – first place	2012 London	Road time trial, H4
Gold medal – first place	2012 London	Road race, H4
Gold medal – first place	2016 Rio de Janeiro	Road race H5
Bronze medal – third place	2016 Rio de Janeiro	Road time trial H4–5
Road World Championships
Silver medal – second place	2023 Glasgow	Time trial H5
Silver medal – second place	2024 Zurich	Time trial H5
Silver medal – second place	2025 Ronse	Time trial H5
Bronze medal – third place	2023 Glasgow	Road race H5
Bronze medal – third place	2024 Zurich	Road race H5
Bronze medal – third place	2025 Ronse	Road race H5
European Championships
Gold medal – first place	2023 Rotterdam	Time trial H5
Silver medal – second place	2023 Rotterdam	Road race H5
Bronze medal – third place	2023 Rotterdam	Mixed team relay H1–H5
Women's cross-country skiing
Winter Paralympic Games
Silver medal – second place	2014 Sochi	5km, sitting
Silver medal – second place	2018 Pyeongchang	5km classical, sitting
Silver medal – second place	2018 Pyeongchang	1.1km sprint, sitting
Silver medal – second place	2018 Pyeongchang	12km sitting
Bronze medal – third place	2018 Pyeongchang	4 x 2.5km mixed relay
World Championships
Gold medal – first place	2013 Sollefteå	Cross-country skiing
Women's biathlon
Winter Paralympic Games
Gold medal – first place	2014 Sochi	6km, sitting
Gold medal – first place	2018 Pyeongchang	10km, sitting
Gold medal – first place	2018 Pyeongchang	12.5km, sitting
Bronze medal – third place	2010 Vancouver	Individual, sitting

Andrea Eskau (born 21 March 1971) is a German handbiker, Paralympic biathlon, and cross country skier who was born in Apolda and was a winner of three gold medals in Summer Paralympic Games.

== Career ==
In 2014, she became a recipient of another gold medal at the 2014 Winter Paralympics in Sochi, Russia. In 2013, she was a cross-country sit skiing winner at the IPC Nordic Skiing World Championship. Eskau also competed at the 2016 Paralympic games in Rio de Janeiro winning a gold medal in the H5 Cycling road race and taking home a bronze medal in the H4-5 time trial. In 2018, Eskau went on to compete at her third Winter Paralympmics and won gold in both the 10 km and 12.5 km sitting biathlon.

== Personal life ==
She became a paraplegic in 1998 when she crashed her bike on the way to school. The accident resulted in many vertebra being broken, this left her without the use of her legs and therefore a wheelchair user.
