= Clara Klug =

German visually impaired cross-country skier and biathlete

Personal information
- Nationality: German
- Born: 16 June 1994 (age 32)
- Website: www.clara-klug.com

Sport
- Country: Germany
- Sport: Paralympic Nordic skiing (Paralympic biathlon and Paralympic cross-country skiing)
- Disability class: B1
- Partner: Martin Hartl (guide)
Medal record
Women's para biathlon
Representing Germany
Paralympic Games
Bronze medal – third place	2018 Pyeongchang	10km visually impaired

Clara Klug (born 16 June 1994) is a German visually impaired cross-country skier and biathlete. She made her Paralympic debut at the 2018 Winter Paralympics for Germany. Klug claimed a bronze medal in the women's 10km visually impaired biathlon event as a part of the 2018 Winter Paralympics.
