= LW5/7 =

Disability skiing classification

LW5/7 is a standing Para alpine and Para Nordic skiing classification for skiers with upper extremity issues in both limbs that may include double amputation of both arms and hands or dysmelia of the upper limbs. The class has three subclasses defined by the location of the disability on the upper extremities. International classification is done by IPC Alpine Skiing and IPC Nordic Skiing. On the national level, classification is handled by national sports federation such as Cross-Country Canada.

Skiers in this class use two skis and no ski poles in para-alpine and para-Nordic, though skiers can use mini-ski poles provided they cannot hold a ski pole without the use of a prosthesis. Skiers develop techniques to ski that compensate for balance issues as a result of missing arms. A factoring system is used in para-alpine and para-Nordic to allow LW5/7 skiers to compete fairly against other skiers with disabilities. While this classification was not grouped with others at the 1984 Winter Olympics Exhibition Competition, it was grouped with other standing classes during events in the 1990s and 2000s.

== Definition ==
LW5/7 is used in para-alpine and para-Nordic standing skiing, where LW stands for Locomotor Winter. People in this class have upper extremity issues in both limbs and may include issue such as paralysis or dysmelia in both arms. The disability may be a result of double amputation of both arms and hands or dysmelia of the upper limbs.

The International Paralympic Committee (IPC) defined this classification for para-alpine as "Competitors with disabilities in both upper limbs skiing with two normal skis and without poles ... The disability shall be such that the functional use of poles is not possible. Typical disability profile of the class is double-arm amputation." In 2002, the Australian Paralympic Committee defined this classification for para-alpine as a standing skiing classification with "Two skis, no poles, disability in both arms or hands." The IPC defined this classification for para-Nordic skiing as for "those with impairment in both upper limbs without the use of prosthesis. The impairment must be such that the athlete is unable to use poles." Cross Country Canada defined this classification for para-Nordic as "Impairment in both upper limbs (arms) without the use of prosthesis. The impairment must be such that the athlete is unable to use poles. If the athlete is able to use a pole they must compete as LW6 or LW8" in 2012.

For international para-alpine skiing competitions, classification is done through IPC Alpine Skiing. A national federation such as Alpine Canada handles classification for domestic competitions. For para-Nordic skiing events, classification is handled by IPC Nordic Skiing Technical Committee on the international level and by the national sports federation such as Cross-Country Canada on a country by country level. When being assessed into this classification, a number of things are considered, including reviewing the skiers medical history and medical information on the skier's disability, having a physical examination and an in person assessment of the skier training or competing. If a skier in this classification has the ability to use a ski pole of some sort, they may do so but they need to changes classes and compete in LW6/8.

=== LW5/7.1 ===
The IPC defines this para-alpine classification as both arms amputated above the elbow, short stumps, no elbow joints or forearms.

=== LW5/7.2 ===
The IPC defines this para-alpine classification as one arm amputated above the elbow, the other below the elbow.

=== LW5/7.3 ===
The IPC defines this para-alpine classification as both arms amputated or dysfunctional below the elbow, both hands unable to hold or use ski poles.

== Equipment and technique ==
Skiers in this class use two skis and no ski poles in para-alpine and para-Nordic. While skiers are prohibited from using traditional ski poles, they may use mini poles so long as they are unable to hold a traditional ski pole without the use of a prostheses. Skiers are also allowed to use prostheses or orthoses in competition. FIS rules for ski boots and binding heights are followed for this class. Skiers in this class must wear a slalom helmet in slalom events and crash helmets during the giant slalom.

In the slalom event, competitors are more likely to use a partial ski pole or a prosthetic to hold a ski pole that they may not use in other disciplines. Techniques to compensate for balance issues as a result of an upper limb disability may be corrected by using knee drives or hip motions.

In the Biathlon, all Paralympic athletes shoot from a prone position. Athletes with amputations can use a rifle support while shooting.

== Sport ==
A factoring system is used in the sport to allow different classes to compete against each other, when there are too few individual competitors in one class in a competition. The factoring system works by having a number for each class based on their functional mobility or vision levels, where the results are calculated by multiplying the finish time by the factored number. The resulting number is the one used to determine the winner in events where the factor system is used. For the 2003/2004 para-Nordic skiing season, the percentage for the classic technique was 79% and percentage for free was 87%. The percentage for the 2008/2009 and 2009/2010 para-Nordic ski seasons was 79% for classic and 87% for free technique. In para-Nordic skiing, the percentage for the 2012/2013 ski season was 79% for classic and 87% for free. Each of the subclasses with in LW5/7 had their own factoring for the para-alpine 2011/2012 skiing season. The factoring for LW5/7.1 alpine skiing classification during the 2011/2012 skiing season was 0.982 for slalom, 0.9777 for giant slalom, 0.9851 for super-G and 0.9809 for downhill, for LW5/7.2 was 0.9862 for slalom, 0.9843 for giant slalom, 0.9873 for super-G and 0.9833 for downhill, and for LW5/7.3 was 0.9882 for slalom, 0.9863 for giant slalom, 0.9893 for super-G and 0.9853 for downhill.

In disability skiing events, this classification is grouped with standing classes who are seeded to start after visually impaired classes and before sitting classes in the slalom and giant slalom. In downhill, super-G, and super combined, this same group competes after the visually impaired classes and sitting classes. In cross-country and biathlon events, this classification is grouped with other standing classes. The IPC advises event organisers to run the men's standing ski group after the blind men's group and before the blind women's group. Women's standing classes are advised to go last. In the biathlon, the skier is required to make sure "that the rifle touches the support in between the marked zone (5 cm in front of/behind the balance point)."

At times, skiers in this class have injured themselves while skiing. Such injuries have occurred for some in this class of the German national para-alpine skiing team between 1994 and 2006. One incident occurred in 1997 and was a femur-fracture caused as a result of a fall while skiing. Another incident occurred at the 1998 Winter Paralympics when a skier injured themselves, resulting in a partial ACL rupture.

== Events ==
While this classification was not grouped with others at the 1984 Winter Olympics exhibition competition, it was grouped during events in the 1990s and 2000s. At the 1984 Winter Olympics exhibition competition, disciplines included on the programme were downhill and giant slalom, and was not grouped with others for medal events for men. At the 1996 Disabled Alpine World Championships in Lech, Austria, men's LW1, LW3 and LW5 were grouped together for medal events. At the 1998 Winter Paralympics, LW1, LW3 and LW5 were put into one group for medal events in para-alpine events. At the 2002 Winter Paralympics in alpine-skiing, LW3, LW5/7 and LW9 were grouped for the men's downhill, super-G, slalom and giant slalom events. On the women's side of the 2002 Games programme, LW1, LW4, LW5 and LW6 classes were combined for the downhill, giant slalom and slalom events. At the 2005 IPC Nordic Skiing World Championships, this class was grouped with other standing skiing classifications. In cross country, this class was eligible to compete in the men and women's 5 km, 10 km and 20 km individual race. In the men and women's biathlon, this classification was again grouped with standing classes in the 7.4 km race with 2 shooting stages 12.5 km race which had four shooting stages. At the 2009 World Championships, there was one male and one female from this class the standing downhill event.
