= Brittany Hudak =

Canadian Para biathlete and cross-country skier (born 1993)

Personal information
- Born: June 2, 1993 (age 33) Prince Albert, Saskatchewan, Canada

Sport
- Country: Canada
- Sport: Para Nordic skiing (Para cross-country skiing and Para biathlon)
- Disability class: LW6/8
Medal record
Representing Canada
Winter Paralympics
Women's Para biathlon
Bronze medal – third place	2018 Pyeongchang	12.5 kilometres
Bronze medal – third place	2022 Beijing	12.5 kilometres
Women's Para cross-country skiing
Bronze medal – third place	2022 Beijing	15 km classical standing
Bronze medal – third place	2026 Milano Cortina	10 km standing

Brittany Hudak (born June 2, 1993) is a Canadian Para biathlete and cross-country skier.

== Early life ==
Hudak was born in Prince Albert, Saskatchewan with only one arm. She grew up participating in cross-country running and track and field. In 2011, at the age of 18, she was introduced to the sport and Paralympics by a former Paralympian 2014 teammate Colette Bourgonje. She never heard of the sport of Paralympic Nordic skiing. Hudak was told about the opportunity to compete against other disabled athletes on a more level playing field. She acknowledged that it wasn't easy at first, but was intrigued enough to keep going. She started out competing in Saskatchewan.

== Career ==
In 2014, after only two-years in the sport, she beat one other athlete for a spot on Team Canada for the 2014 Winter Paralympics in Sochi, Russia. Hudak was 2014-15 World Cup Overall Cross-Country Champion. In December 2017, as part of Team Canada, she won bronze at the para-Nordic World Cup. In 2019, at the 13th World Para Nordic Skiing Championships in Prince George, British Columbia, she won silver in the mixed relay.

At the 2018 Winter Paralympics, she won a bronze medal in the women's 12.5 kilometres biathlon event, which was her first Paralympic medal in her career.

During the 2021-2022 World Para Nordic Skiing World Cup season in December 2021, it made a stop in Canmore, Alberta. Hudak won for four gold and a silver. She won two golds and a silver in women's standing cross-country and two golds in biathlon.

At the 2022 Winter Paralympics, Hudak captured her first medal of the games by winning bronze in the 15 km classical standing.

Hudak captured her fourth bronze medal at the 2026 Winter Paralympics in the 10 km interval start classical standing.
