= Anna Milenina =

Russian Paralympic biathlete (born 1986)

Anna Burmistrova
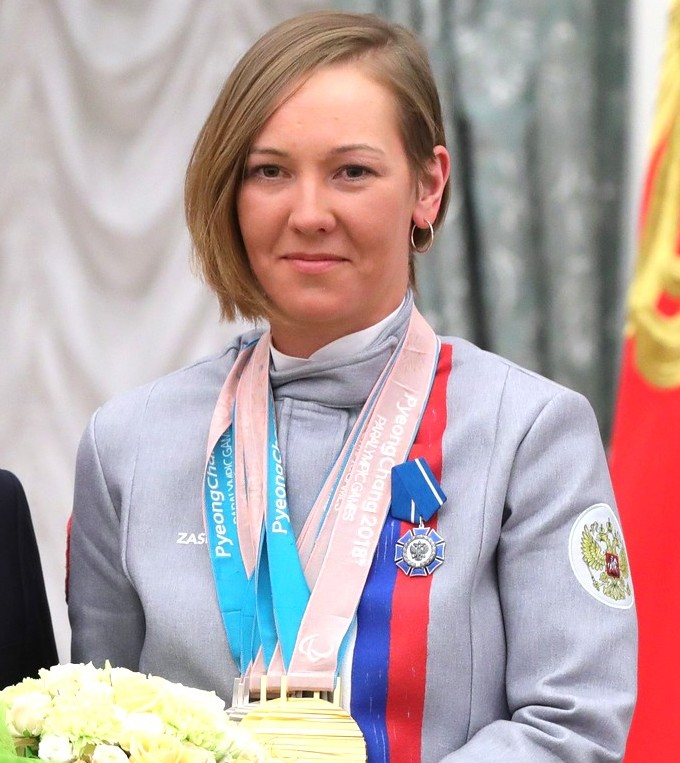

Personal information
- Full name: Anna Alexandrovna Burmistrova
- Born: 15 July 1986 (age 39) Krasnoturyinsk, Sverdlovsk Oblast, Soviet Union

Sport
- Sport: Biathlon, Cross-country skiing
Medal record
Representing Russia
Winter Paralympics
Women's para biathlon
Gold medal – first place	2010 Vancouver	Pursuit standing
Silver medal – second place	2006 Turin	7.5 km standing
Silver medal – second place	2010 Vancouver	12.5 km standing
Silver medal – second place	2014 Sochi	6 km standing
Women's para cross-country skiing
Gold medal – first place	2006 Turin	10 km standing
Gold medal – first place	2010 Vancouver	15 km free standing
Gold medal – first place	2014 Sochi	1 km sprint standing
Gold medal – first place	2014 Sochi	5km standing
Silver medal – second place	2006 Turin	5 km standing
Silver medal – second place	2006 Turin	15 km standing
Bronze medal – third place	2010 Vancouver	1 km sprint standing
Bronze medal – third place	2014 Sochi	15 km free standing
Representing the Neutral Paralympic Athletes
Winter Paralympics
Women's para biathlon
Gold medal – first place	2018 Pyeongchang	12.5 km standing
Silver medal – second place	2018 Pyeongchang	6 km standing
Silver medal – second place	2018 Pyeongchang	10 km standing
Women's para cross-country skiing
Gold medal – first place	2018 Pyeongchang	1.5 km standing
Silver medal – second place	2018 Pyeongchang	15 km free standing

Anna Alexandrovna Milenina (Russian: Анна Александровна Миленина, née Burmistrova; born 15 July 1986) is a Russian Paralympic biathlete and cross-country skier. She was born with Erb's palsy which resulted in her left arm being paralyzed.

She was named Honoured Master of Sport for her efforts at the 2010 Paralympic Games.

== Achievements ==
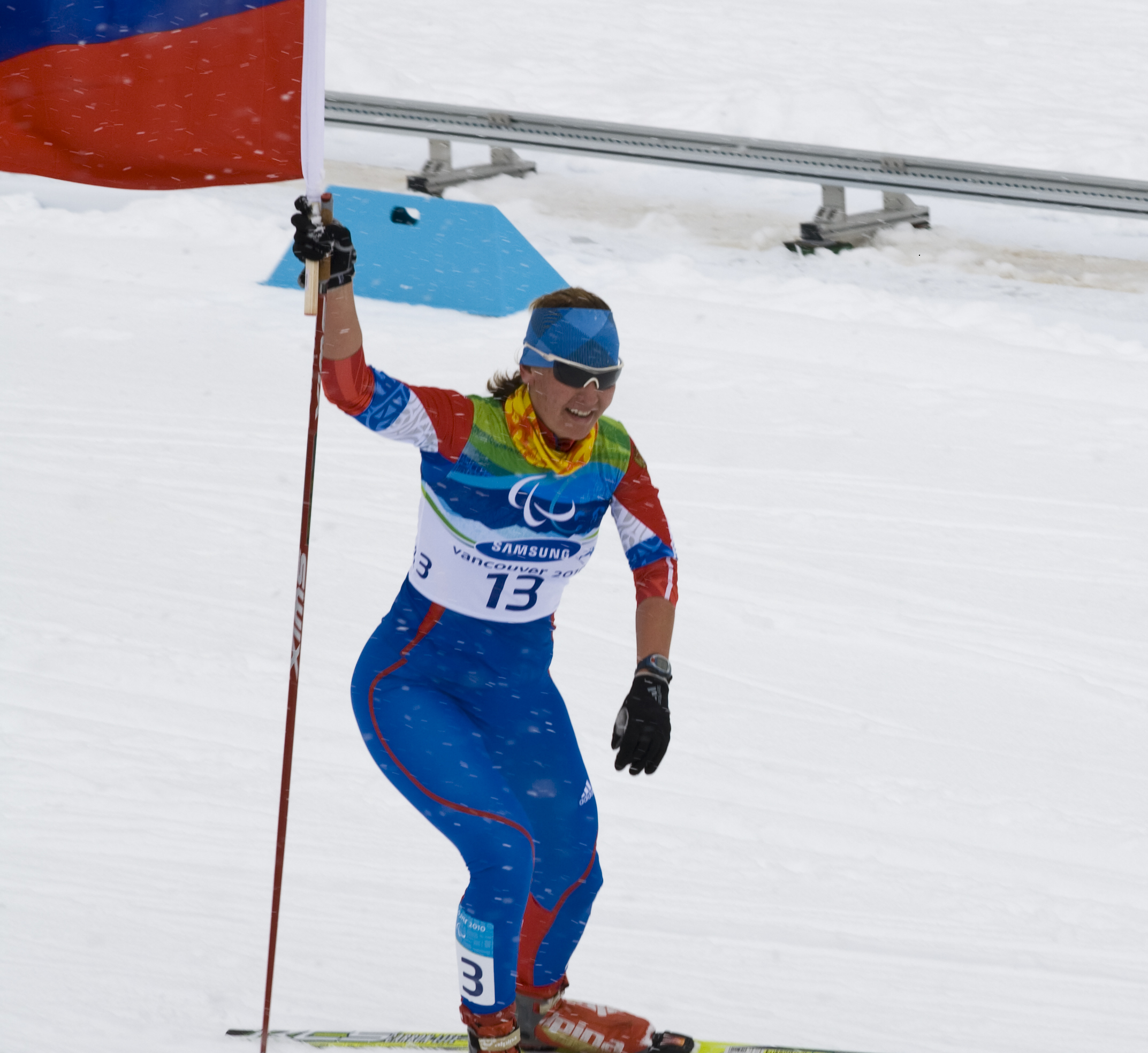
Anna Burmistrova celebrating winning the gold medal in the Women's 3km Pursuit Standing Biathlon at the 2010 Winter Paralympics.

- Gold – 2006 Winter Paralympics (skiing, 10 km.)
- Silver – 2006 Winter Paralympics (skiing, 15 km.)
- Silver – 2006 Winter Paralympics (skiing, 5 km.)
- Silver – 2006 Winter Paralympics (biathlon, 7,5 km.)
- Gold – 2009 Russian Championships (5 km)
- Gold – 2009 World Cup
- Gold – 2010 Winter Paralympics ( biathlon, 3 km ind. pursuit)
- Gold – 2010 Winter Paralympics ( skiing, 15 km FREE.)
- Silver – 2010 Winter Paralympics (biathlon, 12.5 km.)
