= LW6/8 =

Paralympic skiing classification

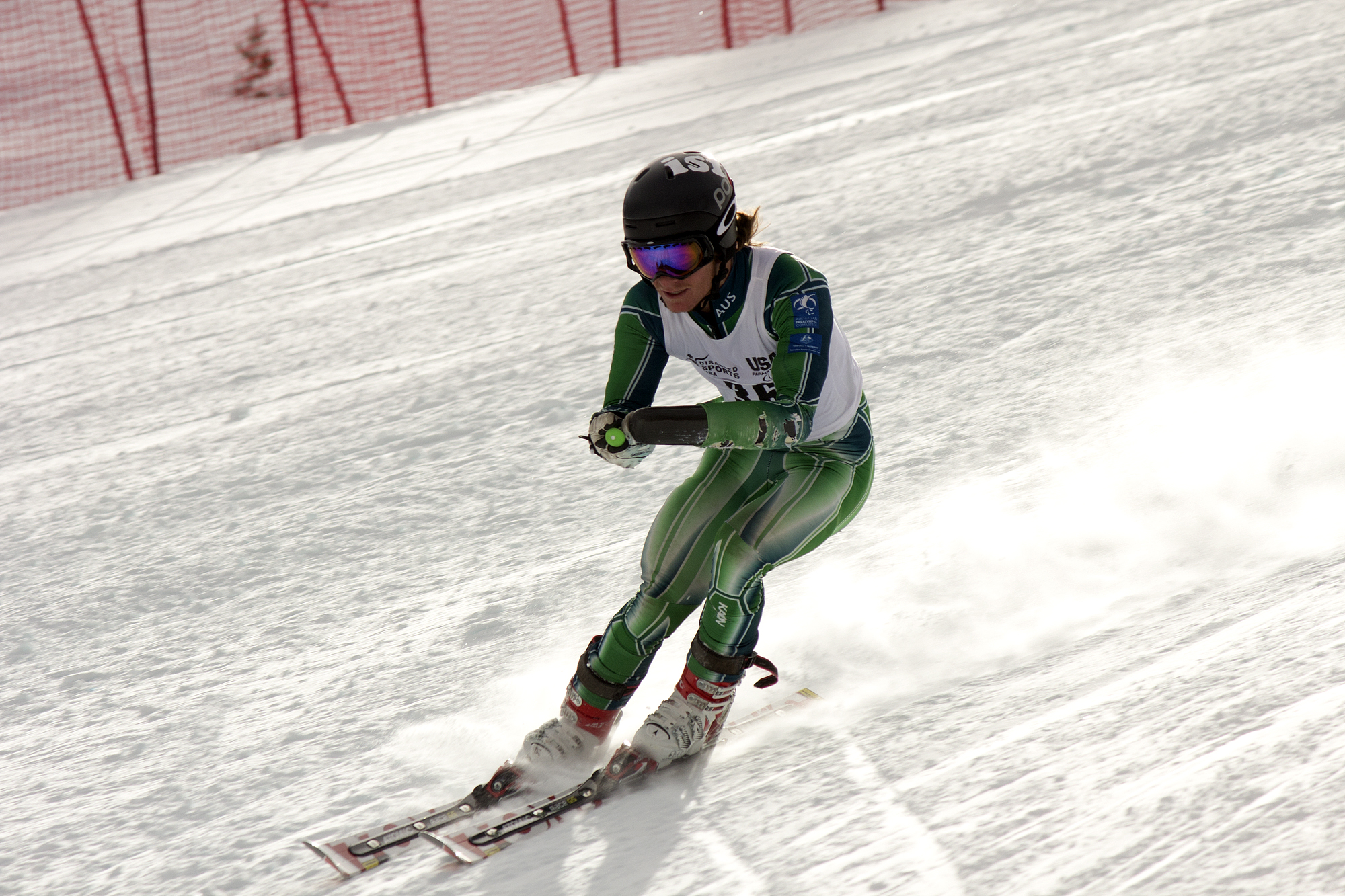
Australian LW6/8 skier Mitchell Gourley competing in the Super G during the second day of the 2012 IPC Nor Am Cup at Copper Mountain, Colorado.

LW6/8 is a Para alpine and Para Nordic standing skiing sport class, a classification defined by the International Paralympic Committee (IPC) for people with an upper extremity issue who have paralysis, motor paresis affecting one arm, a single upper arm amputation or CP8 classified cerebral palsy. LW6/8 skiers use two skis and one pole in both para-alpine and para-Nordic skiing.

Skiers in this class include 2006 New Zealand Winter Paralympian Anthony Field, Germany's Thomas Oelsner and Australia's Mitchell Gourley.

== Definition ==
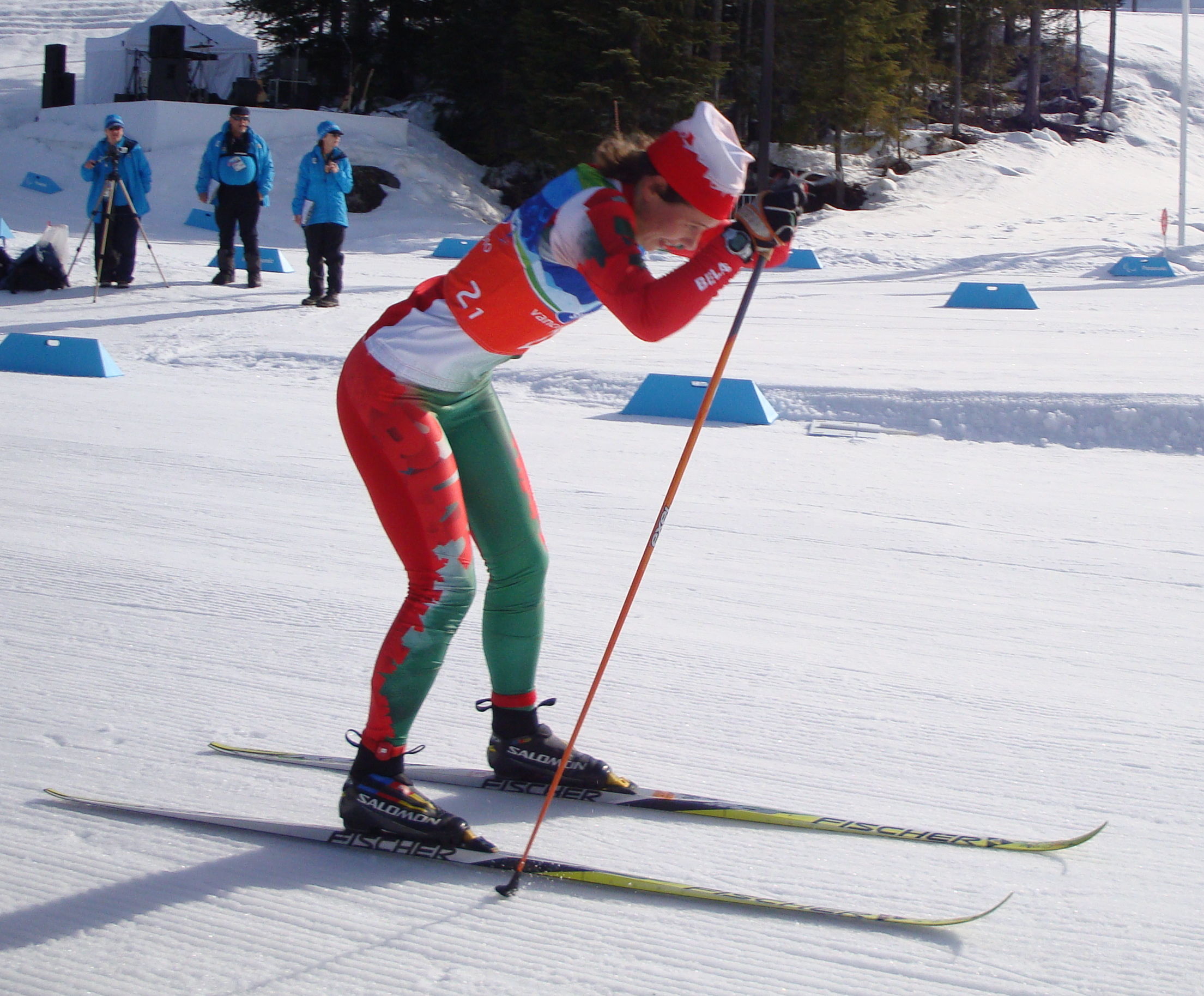
LW6/8 Belarusian cross-country skier Larysa Varona at the 2010 Winter Paralympic Games in Whistler Olympic Park, British Columbia

This classification is used in para-alpine and para-Nordic standing skiing, where LW stands for Locomotor Winter. Designed for people with an upper extremity issue, a skier may be classified as LW6/8 if they have paralysis, motor paresis affecting one arm, or a single upper arm amputation.

The International Paralympic Committee (IPC) defined this classification for para-alpine as "Competitors with disabilities in one upper limb, skiing with two normal skis and one pole ... "The disability shall be such that the functional use of more than one pole is not possible. Typical disability profile of the class is single-arm amputation." In 2002, the Australian Paralympic Committee described this classification as a standing skiing classification with "Two skis, one pole, disability in one arm or hand." For para-Nordic skiing, the IPC defines this class as for "those with impairment in one entire limb."

For international para-alpine skiing competitions, classification is done through IPC Alpine Skiing. A national federation such as Alpine Canada handles classification for domestic competitions. For para-Nordic skiing events, classification is handled by IPC Nordic Skiing Technical Committee on the international level and by the national sports federation such as Cross-Country Canada on a country by country level. When being assessed into this classification, a number of things are considered including reviewing the skiers medical history and medical information on the skier's disability, having a physical and an in person assessment of the skier training or competing.

=== LW6 ===
LW6 is used in para-Nordic skiing for skiers with above the elbow amputations for paralysis affecting the whole arm. Cross Country Canada described LW6 as "Impairment in one entire upper limb. The athlete must not use a prosthesis." in 2012.

=== LW8 ===
LW8 is for skiers with below the elbow amputations or lacking functional use below the elbow. Cross Country Canada described LW8 as "Impairment in one upper limb below the elbow. The athlete must not use a prosthesis or use the affected arm to aid in poling in any way."

== Equipment and technique ==
LW6/8-2 classified French skier Marie Bochet in action at the IPC Alpine World Championships in 2013

LW6/8 skiers use two skis and one pole in both para-alpine and para-Nordic skiing. The two types of skiing differ in that in para-Nordic a skier cannot use a prosthesis while use prostheses or orthoses are allowed in para-alpine. FIS rules for ski boots and binding heights are followed for this class. Socks and other materials are used to pad and protect the stump of the arm as the use of a prosthesis is not allowed. Sometimes, a mitten or cork is used to protect the stump. If the limb is not properly protected, it may get frostbitten.

Lateral balance is an issue for LW6/8 skiers resulting from the missing arm, so skiing techniques are worked on by the skier to correct this. One technique used compensates for balance issues by using knee drives or hip motions. Unlike other para-alpine disciplines, in slalom skiers are more likely to use a partial ski pole or a prosthetic to hold a ski pole.

In the Biathlon, all Paralympic athletes shoot from a prone position. Athletes with amputations can use a rifle support while shooting.

== Sport ==
A factoring system is used in the sport to allow different classes to compete against each other when there are too few individual competitors in one class in a competition. The factoring system works by having a number for each class based on their functional mobility or vision levels, where the results are calculated by multiplying the finish time by the factored number. The resulting number is the one used to determine the winner in events where the factor system is used.

In para-Nordic skiing, which includes the cross-country skiing and biathlon events, this classification is grouped with other standing classes. For the 2003/2004 para-Nordic skiing season, the percentage for LW6 using the classic technique was 91% and percentage for free was 96%, and for LW8 using the classic technique was 92% and percentage for free was 97%. The percentage for the 2008/2009 and 2009/2010 ski seasons was 92% for classic and 97% for free. The percentage for LW6 the 2012/2013 par-Nordic ski season was 91% for classic and 96% for free, and for LW8 was 92% for classic and 97% for free.

In para-alpine skiing events, this classification is grouped with standing classes, who are seeded to start after visually impaired classes and before sitting classes in the slalom and giant slalom. In downhill, super-G and super combined, this same group competes after the visually impaired classes and sitting classes. For alpine events, a skier is required to have their ski poles or equivalent equipment planted in the snow in front of the starting position before the start of the race. The IPC advises event organisers to run the men's standing ski group after the blind men's group and before the blind women's group. Women's standing classes are advised to go last. During the 2005/2006 para-alpine ski season, the giant slalom had a factor of 1.000. The 2011/2012 alpine-skiing season factoring for LW6/8.1 was 0.9902 for Slalom, 0.995 for giant slalom, 0.9969 for super-G and 0.998 for downhill, and for LW6/8.2 was 0.9926 for slalom, 1 for giant slalom, 1 for super-G and 1 for downhill.

If a skier in this class has an arm that is not functional, the rules require the limb be strapped to their body during competition. For Nordic events, LW8 skiers are not allowed to use the stump of their arm for paddling or to help in poling. In the biathlon, the skier is required to make sure "that the rifle touches the support in between the marked zone (5cm in front of / behind the balance point)." If a skier has partial use of their other arm or hand, the rules do not allow them to use it to site or support the rifle. The skier is not permitted to move the support from its upright position.

== Events ==
At the 1984 Winter Olympics Exhibition Competition, 1986 World Disabled Ski Championships, 1988 World Winter Games for the Disabled, 1990 Disabled Alpine World Championships and 2002 Winter Paralympics, disciplines included on the programme were downhill and giant slalom and LW6/8 skiers were not grouped with others classes for medal events for men. At the 1998 Winter Paralympics, the women's LW1, LW3, LW4, LW5 and LW6 classes competed in one group. At the 2004 IPC Alpine World Championships, LW3, LW6/8 and LW9 classified women all skied in the same group against each other during the downhill event. At the 2005 IPC Nordic Skiing World Championships, this class was grouped with other standing skiing classifications. In cross country, this class was eligible to compete in the men and women's 5 km, 10 km and 20 km individual race. In the men and women's biathlon, this classification was again grouped with standing classes in the 7.5 km race with two shooting stages, and the 12.5 km race, which had four shooting stages. At the 2009 IPC Alpine World Championships, there were four women and nine men from this class in the standing downhill event.

== Competitors ==
Paralympic skiers in this class include 2006 New Zealand's Anthony Field, Germany's Thomas Oelsner, and Australia's Mitchell Gourley.
