= Valiantsina Shyts =

Belarusian cross-country skier

Personal information
- Nationality: Belarus
- Born: 1 November 1994 (age 31)

Sport
- Sport: Para cross-country skiing
Medal record
Representing Belarus
Women's para cross-country skiing
World Para Snow Sports Championships
Silver medal – second place	2021 Lillehammer	1 km
Silver medal – second place	2021 Lillehammer	7.5 km
Bronze medal – third place	2021 Lillehammer	15 km

Valiantsina Shyts (born 1 November 1994) is a Belarusian cross-country skier. She made her Paralympic debut during the 2014 Winter Paralympics and took part in the cross-country skiing events.

Shyts won three medals at the 2021 World Para Snow Sports Championships held in Lillehammer, Norway. She won the silver medal in the women's 1 km and 7.5 km sitting events. She also won the bronze medal in the women's long-distance sitting event. Belarus also won the bronze medal in the 2.5 km mixed relay team event.
