= Cross-country skiing at the 2014 Winter Paralympics – Women's 5 km =

Women's 5km Free at the XI Paralympic Winter Games
- Paralympic cross-country skiing
- Venue: Laura Biathlon & Ski Complex, Krasnaya Polyana, Russia
- Dates: 16 March

Women's 5 km (standing) at the XI Paralympic Winter Games
- Competitors: 18 from 9 nations

Medalists
1st place, gold medalist(s)		Anna Milenina	Russia
2nd place, silver medalist(s)		Iullia Batenkova	Ukraine
3rd place, bronze medalist(s)		Oleksandra Kononova	Ukraine

Women's 5 km (sitting) at the XI Paralympic Winter Games
- Competitors: 23 from 12 nations

Medalists
1st place, gold medalist(s)		Andrea Eskau	Germany
2nd place, silver medalist(s)		Lyudmyla Pavlenko	Ukraine
3rd place, bronze medalist(s)		Oksana Masters	United States

Women's 5 km (visually impaired) at the XI Paralympic Winter Games
- Competitors: 9 from 5 nations

Medalists
1st place, gold medalist(s)		Elena Remizova; Guide: Natalia Yakimova	Russia
2nd place, silver medalist(s)		Mikhalina Lysova; Guide: Alexey Ivanov	Russia
3rd place, bronze medalist(s)		Iuliia Budaleeva; Guide: Tatiana Maltseva	Russia

The women's 5 km free competition of the 2014 Winter Paralympics was held at Laura Biathlon & Ski Complex near Krasnaya Polyana, Sochi. The competition took place on 16 March 2014.

== Medal table ==
* Host nation (Russia)

Rank	Nation	Gold	Silver	Bronze	Total
1	Russia (RUS)*	2	1	1	4
2	Germany (GER)	1	0	0	1
3	Ukraine (UKR)	0	2	1	3
4	United States (USA)	0	0	1	1
Totals (4 entries)		3	3	3	9

== Standing ==
Rank	Bib	Name	Country	Real time	Result	Difference
1st place, gold medalist(s)	175	Anna Milenina	Russia	13:57.0	13:31.9	-
2nd place, silver medalist(s)	176	Iuliia Batenkova	Ukraine	14:18.8	13:44.4	+12.5
3rd place, bronze medalist(s)	177	Oleksandra Kononova	Ukraine	14:12.5	13:46.9	+15.0
4	178	Alena Kaufman	Russia	14:16.7	13:51.0	+19.1
5	167	Liudmyla Liashenko	Ukraine	14:29.0	14:02.9	+31.0
6	168	Momoko Dekijima	Japan	15:04.7	14:28.5	+56.6
7	172	Natalia Bratiuk	Russia	15:00.6	14:33.6	+1:01.7
8	170	Maija Järvelä	Finland	15:11.1	14:43.8	+1:11.9
9	166	Yurika Abe	Japan	15:38.1	15:00.6	+1:28.7
10	174	Shoko Ota	Japan	15:31.9	15:03.9	+1:32.0
11	169	Iryna Bui	Ukraine	16:02.2	15:33.3	+2:01.4
12	164	Brittany Hudak	Canada	16:03.9	15:35.0	+2:03.1
13	165	Anne Karen Olsen	Norway	16:25.9	15:46.5	+2:14.6
14	171	Larysa Varona	Belarus	16:32.2	16:02.4	2:30.5
15	173	Helene Ripa	Sweden	17:50.1	16:24.5	+2:52.6
16	163	Caroline Bisson	Canada	17:37.5	16:55.2	+3:23.3
17	162	Marie Karlsen	Norway	22:32.1	20:16.9	+6:45.0
18	161	Yelena Mazurenko	Kazakhstan	30:09.8	28:57.4	+15:25.5

== Sitting ==
Rank	Bib	Name	Country	Real time	Result	Difference
1st place, gold medalist(s)	152	Andrea Eskau	Germany	17:10.4	16:08.6	-
2nd place, silver medalist(s)	149	Lyudmyla Pavlenko	Ukraine	17:30.0	16:27.0	+18.4
3rd place, bronze medalist(s)	143	Oksana Masters	United States	17:04.8	17:04.8	+56.2
4	150	Marta Zaynullina	Russia	17:21.6	17:21.6	+1:13.0
5	148	Svetlana Konovalova	Russia	17:23.4	17:23.4	+1:14.8
6	142	Liudmila Vauchok	Belarus	18:32.4	17:25.7	+1:17.1
7	141	Tatyana McFadden	United States	18:34.7	17:27.8	+1:19.2
8	146	Maria Iovleva	Russia	17:36.8	17:36.8	+1:28.2
9	147	Anja Wicker	Germany	19:36.7	17:39.0	+1:30.4
10	151	Francesca Porcellato	Italy	20:42.1	17:48.2	+1:39.6
11	140	Valiantsina Shyts	Belarus	19:53.7	17:54.3	+1:45.7
12	138	Birgit Skarstein	Norway	19:11.7	18:02.6	+1:54.0
13	144	Colette Bourgonje	Canada	21:10.9	18:13.0	+2:04.4
14	145	Olena Iurkovska	Ukraine	18:23.8	18:23.8	+2:15.2
15	153	Mariann Marthinsen	Norway	18:39.0	18:39.0	+2:30.4
16	136	Monica Bascio	United States	20:02.5	18:50.4	+2:41.8
17	137	Lidziya Hrafeyeva	Belarus	19:13.0	19:13.0	+3:04.4
18	139	Akzhana Abdikarimova	Russia	21:42.4	19:32.2	+3:23.6
19	135	Beth Requist	United States	21:35.1	20:17.4	+4:08.8
20	134	Seo Vo-Ra-Mi	South Korea	24:36.9	22:09.2	+6:00.6
21	133	Mayuko Eno	Japan	24:17.3	23:33.6	+7:25.0
22	132	Sini Pyy	Finland	25:05.4	23:35.1	+7:26.5
23	131	Zhanyl Baltabayeva	Kazakhstan	26:11.5	26:11.5	+10:02.9

== Visually impaired ==
Rank	Bib	Name	Country	Real time	Result	Difference
1st place, gold medalist(s)	199	Elena Remizova; Guide: Natalia Yakimova	Russia	13:40.2	13:23.8	-
2nd place, silver medalist(s)	198	Mikhalina Lysova; Guide: Alexey Ivanov	Russia	13:44.2	13:27.7	+3.9
3rd place, bronze medalist(s)	197	Iuliia Budaleeva; Guide: Tatiana Maltseva	Russia	13:45.1	13:28.6	+4.8
4	195	Oksana Shyshkova; Guide: Lada Nesterenko	Ukraine	14:00.3	13:43.5	+19.7
5	193	Yadviha Skorabahataya; Guide: Iryna Nafranovich	Belarus	14:57.6	14:39.6	+1:15.8
6	194	Vivian Hoesch; Guide: Norman Schlee	Germany	17:11.4	14:57.3	+1:33.5
7	196	Robbi Weldon; Guide: Phil Wood	Canada	15:42.3	15:23.5	+1:59.7
8	191	Margarita Gorbounova; Guide: Andrea Bundon	Canada	15:42.2	15:42.2	+2:18.4
9	192	Olga Prylutska; Guide: Volodymyr Mogylnyi	Ukraine	16:22.5	16:22.5	+2:58.7

== See also ==
- Cross-country skiing at the 2014 Winter Olympics
