= Cross-country skiing at the 2014 Winter Paralympics – Women's 1 km Sprint Classic =

Women's 1km Sprint Classic at the XI Paralympic Winter Games
- Paralympic cross-country skiing
- Venue: Laura Biathlon & Ski Complex, Krasnaya Polyana, Russia
- Dates: 12 March

Women's 1 km sprint (visually impaired) at the XI Paralympic Winter Games
- Competitors: 7 from 4 nations

Medalists
1st place, gold medalist(s)		Mikhalina Lysova; Guide: Alexey Ivanov	Russia
2nd place, silver medalist(s)		Elena Remizova; Guide: Natalia Yakimova	Russia
3rd place, bronze medalist(s)		Oksana Shyshkova; Guide: Lada Nesterenko	Ukraine

Women's 1 km sprint (sitting) at the XI Paralympic Winter Games
- Competitors: 23 from 12 nations

Medalists
1st place, gold medalist(s)		Mariann Marthinsen	Norway
2nd place, silver medalist(s)		Tatyana McFadden	United States
3rd place, bronze medalist(s)		Marta Zaynullina	Russia

Women's 1 km sprint (standing) at the XI Paralympic Winter Games
- Competitors: 17 from 9 nations

Medalists
1st place, gold medalist(s)		Anna Milenina	Russia
2nd place, silver medalist(s)		Iullia Batenkova	Ukraine
3rd place, bronze medalist(s)		Alena Kaufman	Russia

The women's 1 kilometre sprint classic competition of the 2014 Winter Paralympics was held at Laura Biathlon & Ski Complex near Krasnaya Polyana, Sochi. The competition took place on 12 March 2014

== Medal table ==
* Host nation (Russia)

Rank	Nation	Gold	Silver	Bronze	Total
1	Russia (RUS)*	2	1	2	5
2	Norway (NOR)	1	0	0	1
3	Ukraine (UKR)	0	1	1	2
4	United States (USA)	0	1	0	1
Totals (4 entries)		3	3	3	9

== Visually impaired ==
In the cross-country skiing 1 km Sprint visually impaired, the athlete with a visual impairment has a sighted guide. The two skiers are considered a team, and dual medals are awarded.

=== Qualification ===
Rank	Bib	Name	Country	Time	Difference	Notes
1	192	Mikhalina Lysova; Guide: Alexey Ivanov	Russia	4:19.11	-	Q
2	193	Iuliia Budaleeva; Guide: Tatiana Maltseva	Russia	4:24.29	+5.18	Q
3	191	Elena Remizova; Guide: Natalia Yakimova	Russia	4:24.93	+5.82	Q
4	195	Oksana Shyshkova; Guide: Lada Nesterenko	Ukraine	4:37.91	+18.80	Q
5	196	Vivian Hoesch; Guide: Norman Schlee	Germany	4:56.51	+37.40	Q
6	194	Robbi Weldon; Guide: Phil Wood	Canada	4:59.91	+40.80	Q
7	197	Margarita Gorbounova; Guide: Andrea Bundon	Canada	5:14.58	+55.47	

=== Finals ===
==== Semifinal 1 ====
Rank	Bib	Name	Country	Time	Difference	Notes
1	1	Mikhalina Lysova; Guide: Alexey Ivanov	Russia	4:50.3	-	Q
2	4	Oksana Shyshkova; Guide: Lada Nesterenko	Ukraine	4:57.7	+7.4	Q
3	6	Robbi Weldon; Guide: Phil Wood	Canada	5:10.3	+20.0	

==== Semifinal 2 ====
Rank	Bib	Name	Country	Time	Difference	Notes
1	3	Elena Remizova; Guide: Natalia Yakimova	Russia	5:33.7	-	Q
2	2	Iuliia Budaleeva; Guide: Tatiana Maltseva	Russia	5:35.4	+1.7	Q
3	5	Vivian Hoesch; Guide: Norman Schlee	Germany	5:54.9	+21.2	

==== Final ====
Rank	Bib	Name	Country	Time	Difference
1st place, gold medalist(s)	1	Mikhalina Lysova; Guide: Alexey Ivanov	Russia	4:11.5	-
2nd place, silver medalist(s)	3	Elena Remizova; Guide: Natalia Yakimova	Russia	4:17.1	+5.6
3rd place, bronze medalist(s)	4	Oksana Shyshkova; Guide: Lada Nesterenko	Ukraine	4:24.6	+13.1
4	2	Iuliia Budaleeva; Guide: Tatiana Maltseva	Russia	4:32.1	+20.6

== Sitting ==
=== Qualification ===
Rank	Bib	Name	Country	Time	Difference	Notes
1	153	Mariann Marthinsen	Norway	2:30.61	-	Q
2	152	Andrea Eskau	Germany	2:34.49	+3.88	Q
3	144	Oksana Masters	United States	2:34.81	+4.20	Q
4	142	Tatyana McFadden	United States	2:35.22	+4.61	Q
5	147	Maria Iovleva	Russia	2:37.59	+6.98	Q
6	150	Marta Zaynullina	Russia	2:37.89	+7.28	Q
7	138	Birgit Skarstein	Norway	2:40.51	+9.90	Q
8	151	Francesca Porcellato	Italy	2:42.56	+11.95	Q
9	143	Liudmila Vauchok	Belarus	2:44.16	+13.55	Q
10	141	Valiantsina Shyts	Belarus	2:44.70	+14.09	Q
11	146	Olena Iurkovska	Ukraine	2:44.82	+14.21	Q
12	140	Natalia Kocherova	Russia	2:45.97	+15.36	Q
13	137	Lidziya Hrafeyeva	Belarus	2:48.06	+17.45	
14	139	Akzhana Abdikarimova	Russia	2:48.17	+17.56	
15	148	Anja Wicker	Germany	2:50.78	+20.17	
16	145	Colette Bourgonje	Canada	2:54.53	+23.92	
17	149	Lyudmyla Pavlenko	Ukraine	2:55.06	+24.45	
18	136	Monica Bascio	United States	2:56.81	+26.20	
19	135	Beth Requist	United States	3:09.79	+39.18	
20	134	Seo Vo-Ra-Mi	South Korea	3:24.90	+54.29	
21	133	Mayuko Eno	Japan	3:25.75	+55.14	
22	132	Sini Pyy	Finland	3:35.12	+1:04.51	
23	131	Zhanyl Baltabayeva	Kazakhstan	3:35.74	1:05.13	

=== Finals ===
==== Semifinal 1 ====
Rank	Bib	Name	Country	Time	Difference	Notes
1	1	Mariann Marthinsen	Norway	2:57.7	-	Q
2	4	Tatyana McFadden	United States	2:57.9	+0.2	Q
3	12	Natalia Kocherova	Russia	3:02.0	+4.3	Q
4	5	Maria Iovleva	Russia	3:03.9	+6.2	
5	9	Liudmila Vauchok	Belarus	3:08.3	+10.6	
6	8	Francesca Porcellato	Italy	3:09.4	+11.7	

==== Semifinal 2 ====
Rank	Bib	Name	Country	Time	Difference	Notes
1	2	Andrea Eskau	Germany	2:51.2	-	Q
2	3	Oksana Masters	United States	2:52.3	+1.1	Q
3	6	Marta Zaynullina	Russia	2:55.1	+3.9	Q
4	10	Valiantsina Shyts	Belarus	3:00.2	+9.0	
5	11	Olena Iurkovska	Ukraine	3:05.4	+14.2	
6	7	Birgit Skarstein	Norway	3:11.2	+20.0	

==== Final ====
Rank	Bib	Name	Country	Time	Difference
1st place, gold medalist(s)	1	Mariann Marthinsen	Norway	2:45.6	-
2nd place, silver medalist(s)	4	Tatyana McFadden	United States	2:45.7	+0.1
3rd place, bronze medalist(s)	6	Marta Zaynullina	Russia	2:46.6	+1.0
4	3	Oksana Masters	United States	2:47.6	+2.0
5	12	Natalia Kocherova	Russia	2:49.0	+3.4
RAL	2	Andrea Eskau	Germany		

== Standing ==
=== Qualification ===
Rank	Bib	Name	Country	Time	Difference	Notes
1	162	Oleksandra Kononova	Ukraine	4:32.87	-	Q
2	164	Anna Milenina	Russia	4:37.72	+4.85	Q
3	163	Iuliia Batenkova	Ukraine	4:39.63	+6.76	Q
4	172	Liudmyla Liashenko	Ukraine	4:41.60	+8.73	Q
5	169	Maija Järvelä	Finland	4:42.15	+9.28	Q
6	161	Alena Kaufman	Russia	4:44.93	+12.06	Q
7	165	Shoko Ota	Japan	4:47.24	+14.37	Q
8	167	Natalia Bratiuk	Russia	4:53.69	+20.82	Q
9	173	Yurika Abe	Japan	5:00.49	+27.62	Q
10	171	Momoko Dekijima	Japan	5:05.60	+32.73	Q
11	174	Anne Karen Olsen	Norway	5:09.74	+36.87	Q
12	175	Brittany Hudak	Canada	5:13.13	+40.26	Q
13	170	Iryna Bui	Ukraine	5:18.34	+45.47	
14	168	Larysa Varona	Belarus	5:31.59	+58.72	
15	166	Helene Ripa	Sweden	5:50.15	+1:17.28	
16	177	Yelena Mazurenko	Kazakhstan	7:44.90	+3:12.03	
DNS	176	Caroline Bisson	Canada			

=== Finals ===
==== Semifinal 1 ====
Rank	Bib	Name	Country	Time	Difference	Notes
1	8	Natalia Bratiuk	Russia	4:44.0	-	Q
2	1	Oleksandra Kononova	Ukraine	4:45.7	+1.7	Q
3	5	Maija Järvelä	Finland	4:47.4	+3.4	Q
4	4	Liudmyla Liashenko	Ukraine	4:52.0	+8.0	
5	9	Yurika Abe	Japan	5:12.8	+28.8	
6	12	Brittany Hudak	Canada	5:13.0	+29.0	

==== Semifinal 2 ====
Rank	Bib	Name	Country	Time	Difference	Notes
1	3	Iuliia Batenkova	Ukraine	4:46.8	-	Q
2	2	Anna Milenina	Russia	4:48.9	+2.1	Q
3	6	Alena Kaufman	Russia	4:49.9	+3.1	Q
4	7	Shoko Ota	Japan	4:50.0	+3.2	
5	10	Momoko Dekijima	Japan	5:12.5	+25.7	
6	11	Anne Karen Olsen	Norway	5:19.9	+33.1	

==== Final ====
Rank	Bib	Name	Country	Time	Difference
1st place, gold medalist(s)	2	Anna Milenina	Russia	4:26.9	-
2nd place, silver medalist(s)	3	Iuliia Batenkova	Ukraine	4:31.4	+4.5
3rd place, bronze medalist(s)	6	Alena Kaufman	Russia	4:31.7	+4.8
4	5	Maija Järvelä	Finland	4:36.3	+9.4
5	1	Oleksandra Kononova	Ukraine	4:47.1	+20.2
6	8	Natalia Bratiuk	Russia	4:48.7	+21.8

== See also ==
- Cross-country skiing at the 2014 Winter Olympics
