= Biathlon at the 2014 Winter Paralympics – Women's 6 kilometres =

Women's 6 km at the XI Paralympic Winter Games
- Paralympic biathlon
- Venue: Laura Biathlon & Ski Complex
- Dates: March 8

Women's 6 km (visually impaired) at the XI Paralympic Winter Games
- Competitors: 8 from 5 nations

Medalists
1st place, gold medalist(s)		Mikhalina Lysova; Guide: Alexey Ivanov	Russia
2nd place, silver medalist(s)		Iuliia Budaleeva; Guide: Tatiana Maltseva	Russia
3rd place, bronze medalist(s)		Oksana Skyshkova; Guide: Lada Nesterenko	Ukraine

Women's 6 km (sitting) at the XI Paralympic Winter Games
- Competitors: 10 from 5 nations

Medalists
1st place, gold medalist(s)		Andrea Eskau	Germany
2nd place, silver medalist(s)		Svetlana Konovalova	Russia
3rd place, bronze medalist(s)		Olena Iurkovska	Ukraine

Women's 6 km (standing) at the XI Paralympic Winter Games
- Competitors: 14 from 7 nations

Medalists
1st place, gold medalist(s)		Alena Kaufman	Russia
2nd place, silver medalist(s)		Anna Milenina	Russia
3rd place, bronze medalist(s)		Iuliia Batenkova	Ukraine

The women's 6 km competition of the Sochi 2014 Paralympics was held at Laura Biathlon & Ski Complex near Krasnaya Polyana, Sochi. The competition took place on 8 March.

== Medal table ==
* Host nation (Russia)

Rank	Nation	Gold	Silver	Bronze	Total
1	Russia (RUS)*	2	3	0	5
2	Germany (GER)	1	0	0	1
3	Ukraine (UKR)	0	0	3	3
Totals (3 entries)		3	3	3	9

== Visually impaired ==
In this event, the athlete with a visual impairment has a sighted guide. The two skiers are considered a team, and dual medals are awarded.

Rank	Bib	Name	Country	Misses	Real time	Calculated time	Difference
1st place, gold medalist(s)	141	Mikhalina Lysova; Guide: Alexey Ivanov	Russia	0+0	20:27.8	20:03.2	–
2nd place, silver medalist(s)	142	Iuliia Budaleeva; Guide: Tatiana Maltseva	Russia	2+0	20:56.8	20:31.7	+28.5
3rd place, bronze medalist(s)	144	Oksana Shyshkova; Guide: Lada Nesterenko	Ukraine	0+0	21:14.5	20:49.0	+45.8
4	143	Elena Remizova; Guide: Natalia Yakimova	Russia	2+0	21:34.7	21:08.8	+1.05.6
5	145	Vivian Hösch; Guide: Norman Schlee	Germany	0+0	24:47.6	21:34.2	+1.31.0
6	148	Yadviha Skorabahataya; Guide: Iryna Nafranovich	Belarus	0+2	23:18.9	22:50.9	+2:47.7
7	146	Margarita Gorbounova; Guide: Andrea Bundon	Canada	2+0	26:17.8	26:17.8	+6:14.6
	147	Olga Prylutska; Guide: Volodymyr Mogylnyi	Ukraine	DNF			

== Sitting ==
Rank	Bib	Name	Country	Misses	Real time	Calculated time	Difference
1st place, gold medalist(s)	103	Andrea Eskau	Germany	0+0	20:26.0	19:12.4	–
2nd place, silver medalist(s)	101	Svetlana Konovalova	Russia	1+0	19:31.1	19:31.1	+18.7
3rd place, bronze medalist(s)	104	Olena Iurkovska	Ukraine	0+0	19:39.6	19:39.6	+27.2
4	110	Oksana Masters	United States	0+0	19:43.2	19:43.2	+30.8
5	105	Marta Zaynullina	Russia	0+0	19:50.1	19:50.1	+37.7
6	107	Anja Wicker	Germany	0+1	22:10.1	19:57.1	+44.7
7	106	Lyudymyla Pavlenko	Ukraine	0+2	21:34.8	20:17.1	+1:04.7
8	102	Maria Iovleva	Russia	0+2	20:25.1	20:25.1	+1:12.7
9	109	Lidziya Hrafeyeva	Belarus	0+0	20:45.8	20:45.8	+1:33.4
10	108	Akzhana Abdikarimova	Russia	1+3	26:35.0	23:55.5	+1:43.1

== Standing ==
Rank	Bib	Name	Country	Misses	Real time	Calculated time	Difference
1st place, gold medalist(s)	121	Alena Kaufman	Russia	0+0	19:01.4	18:27.2	–
2nd place, silver medalist(s)	122	Anna Milenina	Russia	1+1	19:32.6	18:57.4	+30.2
3rd place, bronze medalist(s)	128	Iuliia Batenkova	Ukraine	1+0	20:05.9	19:17.7	+50.5
4	125	Maija Järvelä	Finland	0+0	20:03.5	19:27.4	+1:00.2
5	123	Oleksandra Kononova	Ukraine	2+0	20:11.3	19:35.0	+1:07.8
6	124	Shoko Ota	Japan	0+0	20:24.2	19:47.5	+1.20.3
7	130	Liudmyla Liashenko	Ukraine	0+0	20:54.9	20:17.3	+1:50.1
8	127	Momoko Dekijima	Japan	1+0	21:30.2	20:38.6	+2:11.4
9	129	Natalia Bratiuk	Russia	1+1	22:03.7	21:24.0	+2:56.8
10	132	Pamela Novaglio	Italy	0+0	22:38.3	21:44.0	+3:16.8
11	126	Iryna Bui	Ukraine	1+2	22:52.3	22:11.1	+3:43.9
12	131	Larysa Varona	Belarus	1+0	23:39.9	22:57.3	+4:30.1
13	133	Yurika Abe	Japan	1+3	25:09.7	24:09.3	+5:42.1
14	134	Caroline Bisson	Canada	2+1	28:22.9	27:14.8	+8:47.6
