= Biathlon at the 2014 Winter Paralympics – Women's 10 kilometres =

Women's 10 km at the XI Paralympic Winter Games
- Paralympic biathlon
- Venue: Laura Biathlon & Ski Complex
- Dates: March 11

Women's 10 km (visually impaired) at the XI Paralympic Winter Games
- Competitors: 4 from 2 nations

Medalists
1st place, gold medalist(s)		Mikhalina Lysova; Guide: Alexey Ivanov	Russia
2nd place, silver medalist(s)		Iuliia Budaleeva; Guide: Tatiana Maltseva	Russia
3rd place, bronze medalist(s)		Oksana Skyshkova; Guide: Lada Nesterenko	Ukraine

Women's 10 km (sitting) at the XI Paralympic Winter Games
- Competitors: 10 from 5 nations

Medalists
1st place, gold medalist(s)		Anja Wicker	Germany
2nd place, silver medalist(s)		Svetlana Konovalova	Russia
3rd place, bronze medalist(s)		Lyudymyla Pavlenko	Ukraine

Women's 10 km (standing) at the XI Paralympic Winter Games
- Competitors: 13 from 7 nations

Medalists
1st place, gold medalist(s)		Alena Kaufman	Russia
2nd place, silver medalist(s)		Oleksandra Kononova	Ukraine
3rd place, bronze medalist(s)		Natalia Bratiuk	Russia

The women's 10 km competition of the Sochi 2014 Paralympics was held at Laura Biathlon & Ski Complex near Krasnaya Polyana, Sochi. The competition took place on 11 March.

== Medal table ==
* Host nation (Russia)

Rank	Nation	Gold	Silver	Bronze	Total
1	Russia (RUS)*	2	2	1	5
2	Germany (GER)	1	0	0	1
3	Ukraine (UKR)	0	1	2	3
Totals (3 entries)		3	3	3	9

== Visually impaired ==
In biathlon, visually impaired, the athlete with a visual impairment has a sighted guide. The two skiers are considered a team, and dual medals are awarded.

Rank	Bib	Name	Country	Misses	Real time	Calculated time	Difference
1st place, gold medalist(s)	144	Mikhalina Lysova; Guide: Alexey Ivanov	Russia	0+1+0+1	30:48.5	30:11.5	-
2nd place, silver medalist(s)	143	Iuliia Budaleeva; Guide: Tatiana Maltseva	Russia	1+0+0+0	31:16.4	30:38.9	+27.4
3rd place, bronze medalist(s)	142	Oksana Shyshkova; Guide: Lada Nesterenko	Ukraine	1+2+0+1	35:44.3	35:01.4	+4:49.9
4	141	Olga Prylutska; Guide: Volodymyr Mogylnyi	Ukraine	0+2+2+2	44:01.6	44:01.6	+13:50.1

== Sitting ==
Rank	Bib	Name	Country	Misses	Real time	Calculated time	Difference
1st place, gold medalist(s)	104	Anja Wicker	Germany	0+0+0+0	36:33.8	32:54.4	-
2nd place, silver medalist(s)	110	Svetlana Konovalova	Russia	0+0+1+1	33:36.7	33:36.7	+42.3
3rd place, bronze medalist(s)	105	Lyudmyla Pavlenko	Ukraine	0+0+2+0	36:34.3	34:22.6	+1:28.2
4	107	Olena Iurkovska	Ukraine	2+1+0+0	34:49.2	34:49.2	+1:54.8
5	103	Akzhana Abdikarimova	Russia	0+0+0+0	39:06.0	35:11.4	+2:17.0
6	106	Marta Zaynullina	Russia	0+0+2+2	36:22.4	36:22.4	+3:28.0
7	102	Lidziya Hrafeyeva	Belarus	0+3+0+1	36:56.5	36:56.5	+4:02.1
8	101	Oksana Masters	United States	2+2+3+2	40:22.8	40:22.8	+7:28.4
DSQ	109	Maria Iovleva	Russia	1+1+2+1	36:38.0		
DNF	108	Andrea Eskau	Germany	0+1+4			

== Standing ==
Rank	Bib	Name	Country	Misses	Real time	Calculated time	Difference
1st place, gold medalist(s)	133	Alena Kaufman	Russia	1+0+0+0	30:52.7	29:57.1	-
2nd place, silver medalist(s)	131	Oleksandra Kononova	Ukraine	0+0+1+0	31:30.4	30:33.7	+36.6
3rd place, bronze medalist(s)	125	Natalia Bratiuk	Russia	0+0+0+1	31:55.0	30:57.6	+1:00.5
4	124	Liudmyla Liashenko	Ukraine	0+0+0+0	31:59.2	31:01.6	+1:04.5
5	126	Iuliia Batenkova	Ukraine	0+0+1+1	33:23.9	32:03.7	+2:06.6
6	132	Anna Milenina	Russia	2+0+1+1	33:13.6	32:13.8	+2:16.7
7	128	Iryna Bui	Ukraine	0+0+0+0	33:48.3	32:47.5	+2:50.4
8	129	Maija Järvelä	Finland	1+0+1+0	34:22.3	33:20.4	+3:23.3
9	127	Momoko Dekijima	Japan	0+1+1+1	34:44.5	33:21.1	+3:24.0
10	122	Pamela Novaglio	Italy	0+0+0+1	36:24.6	34:57.2	+5:00.1
11	121	Caroline Bisson	Canada	2+0+1+0	41:33.6	39:53.9	+9:56.8
DNF	123	Larysa Varona	Belarus	1+0+2			
DNS	130	Shoko Ota	Japan				
