= Ukraine at the 2014 Winter Paralympics =

- IPC code: UKR
- NPC: National Sports Committee for the Disabled of Ukraine
- Website: www.paralympic.org.ua

in Sochi
- Competitors: 23 in 3 sports
- Flag bearers: Mykhaylo Tkachenko (opening); Lyudmyla Pavlenko (closing)
- Medals Ranked 4th: Gold 5 Silver 9 Bronze 11 Total 25

Winter Paralympics appearances (overview)
- 1998; 2002; 2006; 2010; 2014; 2018; 2022; 2026

Other related appearances
- Soviet Union (1988); Unified Team (1992)

Ukraine competed at the 2014 Winter Paralympics in Sochi, Russia, held between 7–16 March 2014.

== Alpine skiing ==
Men

Athlete	Event	Run 1		Run 2		Total	
Athlete	Event	Time	Rank	Time	Rank	Time	Rank
Dmytro Kuzmin; Guide: Sergii Dorosh	Slalom visually impaired	1:06.64	15	1:06.17	10	2:12.81	10
Dmytro Kuzmin; Guide: Sergii Dorosh	Giant slalom visually impaired	1:38.85	16	1:36.12	13	3:14.97	13

=== Snowboarding ===
Para-snowboarding is making its debut at the Winter Paralympics and it will be placed under the Alpine skiing program during the 2014 Games.

Men

Athlete	Event	Race 1		Race 2		Race 3		Total	
Athlete	Event	Time	Rank	Time	Rank	Time	Rank	Time	Rank
Ivan Osharov	Snowboard cross	DSQ		1:12.87	20	1:10.35	21	2:23.22	24

== Biathlon ==
Men

Athlete	Events	Final				
Athlete	Events	Real Time	Calculated Time	Missed Shots	Result	Rank
Oleksandr Korniiko	7.5km, sitting	24:37.3	24:37.3	1+0	24:37.3	17
Oleksandr Korniiko	12.5km, sitting	40:34.2	40:34.2	0+0+0+2	40:34.2	15
Oleksandr Korniiko	15km, sitting	47:17.0	49:17.0	1+1+0+0	49:17.0	13
Anatolii Kovalevskyi; Guide: Oleksandr Mukshyn	7.5km, visually impaired	21:47.7	21:21.5	0+0	21:21.5	6
Anatolii Kovalevskyi; Guide: Oleksandr Mukshyn	12.5km, visually impaired	DNF				
Anatolii Kovalevskyi; Guide: Oleksandr Mukshyn	15km, visually impaired	38:03.9	38:18.2	0+1+0+0	38:18.2	2nd place, silver medalist(s)
Vitaliy Lukyanenko; Guide: Borys Babar	7.5km, visually impaired	20:18.8	20:18.8	0+0	20:18.8	1st place, gold medalist(s)
Vitaliy Lukyanenko; Guide: Borys Babar	12.5km, visually impaired	31:04.0	31:04.0	0+0+0+0	31:04.0	1st place, gold medalist(s)
Vitaliy Lukyanenko; Guide: Borys Babar	15km, visually impaired	37:21.6	38:21.6	0+1+0+0	38:21.6	3rd place, bronze medalist(s)
Vladyslav Maystrenko	7.5km, standing	23:51.8	23:08.8	2+2	23:08.8	16
Vladyslav Maystrenko	12.5km, standing	34:33.4	33:31.2	1+2+0+1	33:31.2	14
Vladyslav Maystrenko	15km, standing	43:30.1	45:11.8	2+0+0+1	45:11.8	14
Ihor Reptyukh	7.5km, standing	20:49.8	20:12.3	1+0	20:12.3	11
Ihor Reptyukh	12.5km, standing	34:16.6	33:14.9	2+1+2+3	33:14.9	12
Ihor Reptyukh	15km, standing	38:20.2	40:11.2	1+1+1+0	40:11.2	9
Iaroslav Reshetynskiy; Guide: Dmytro Khurtyk	7.5km, visually impaired	22:55.2	22:55.2	0+1	22:55.2	11
Iaroslav Reshetynskiy; Guide: Dmytro Khurtyk	12.5km, visually impaired	33:21.9	33:21.9	0+0+0+0	33:21.9	6
Iaroslav Reshetynskiy; Guide: Dmytro Khurtyk	15km, visually impaired	41:19.5	41:19.5	0+0+0+0	41:19.5	7
Dmytro Shulga; Guide: Artur Gergardt	7.5km, visually impaired	24:48.4	24:18.6	1+1	24:18.6	13
Dmytro Shulga; Guide: Artur Gergardt	12.5km, visually impaired	36:27.7	35:43.9	0+0+0+0	35:43.9	7
Dmytro Shulga; Guide: Artur Gergardt	15km, visually impaired	44:09.1	44:16.1	0+0+1+0	44:16.1	11
Vitalii Sytnyk	7.5km, standing	22:21.6	21:27.9	0+1	21:27.9	15
Vitalii Sytnyk	12.5km, standing	34:39.4	33:16.2	0+0+0+2	33:16.2	13
Vitalii Sytnyk	15km, standing	43:33.6	41:49.1	0+0+0+0	41:49.1	13
Mykhaylo Tkachenko	7.5km, sitting	23:58.3	23:58.3	0+1	23:58.3	12
Mykhaylo Tkachenko	12.5km, sitting	38:48.4	38:48.4	0+1+0+1	38:48.4	10
Mykhaylo Tkachenko	15km, sitting	46:23.6	49:23.6	0+1+2+0	49:23.6	15
Iurii Utkin; Guide: Vitaliy Kazakov	7.5km, visually impaired	21:14.6	21:14.6	0+0	21:14.6	4
Iurii Utkin; Guide: Vitaliy Kazakov	12.5km, visually impaired	32:04.5	32:04.5	0+0+0+0	32:04.5	4
Iurii Utkin; Guide: Vitaliy Kazakov	15km, visually impaired	39:11.0	39:11.0	0+0+0+0	39:11.0	5
Grygorii Vovchynskyi	7.5km, standing	20:14.8	19:38.4	0+1	19:38.4	8
Grygorii Vovchynskyi	12.5km, standing	32:24.6	31:26.3	1+0+1+1	31:26.3	7
Grygorii Vovchynskyi	15km, standing	38:51.0	37:41.1	0+0+0+0	37:41.1	1st place, gold medalist(s)
Maksym Yarovyi	7.5km, sitting	24:38.9	21:11.9	0+0	21:11.9	2nd place, silver medalist(s)
Maksym Yarovyi	12.5km, sitting	43:42.6	37:35.4	0+1+2+3	37:35.4	7
Maksym Yarovyi	15km, sitting	51:06.2	48:56.9	0+1+4+0	48:56.9	12

Women

Athlete	Events	Final				
Athlete	Events	Real Time	Calculated Time	Missed Shots	Result	Rank
Iuliia Batenkova	6km, standing	20:05.9	19:17.7	1+0	19:17.7	3rd place, bronze medalist(s)
Iuliia Batenkova	10km, standing	33:23.9	32:03.7	0+0+1+1	32:03.7	5
Iuliia Batenkova	12.5km, standing	42:11.1	42:29.9	1+1+0+0	42:29.9	6
Iryna Bui	6km, standing	22:52.3	22:11.1	1+2	22:11.1	11
Iryna Bui	10km, standing	33:48.3	32:47.5	0+0+0+0	32:47.5	7
Iryna Bui	12.5km, standing	43:57.7	43:38.6	0+0+1+0	43:38.6	9
Olena Iurkovska	6km, sitting	19:39.6	19:39.6	0+0	19:39.6	3rd place, bronze medalist(s)
Olena Iurkovska	10km, sitting	34:49.2	34:49.2	2+1+0+0	34:49.2	4
Olena Iurkovska	12.5km, sitting	41:30.8	41:30.8	0+0+0+0	41:30.8	3rd place, bronze medalist(s)
Oleksandra Kononova	6km, standing	20:11.3	19:35.0	2+0	19:35.0	5
Oleksandra Kononova	10km, standing	31:30.4	30:33.7	0+0+1+0	30:33.7	2nd place, silver medalist(s)
Oleksandra Kononova	12.5km, standing	40:43.9	40:30.6	0+0+1+0	40:30.6	1st place, gold medalist(s)
Liudmyla Liashenko	6km, standing	20:54.9	20:17.3	0+0	20:17.3	7
Liudmyla Liashenko	10km, standing	31:59.2	31:01.6	0+0+0+0	31:01.6	4
Liudmyla Liashenko	12.5km, standing	42:45.3	42:28.3	0+1+0+0	42:28.3	5
Lyudmyla Pavlenko	6km, sitting	21:34.8	20:17.1	0+2	20:17.1	7
Lyudmyla Pavlenko	10km, sitting	36:34.3	34:22.6	0+0+2+0	34:22.6	3rd place, bronze medalist(s)
Lyudmyla Pavlenko	12.5km, sitting	44:35.5	43:55.0	1+1+0+0	43:55.0	6
Olga Prylutska; Guide: Volodymyr Mogylnyi	6km, visually impaired	DNF				
Olga Prylutska; Guide: Volodymyr Mogylnyi	10km, visually impaired	44:01.6	44:01.6	0+2+2+2	44:01.6	4
Olga Prylutska; Guide: Volodymyr Mogylnyi	12.5km, visually impaired	44:21.9	46:21.9	0+1+0+1	46:21.9	5
Oksana Shyshkova; Guide: Lada Nesterenko	6km, visually impaired	21:14.5	20:49.0	0+0	20:49.0	3rd place, bronze medalist(s)
Oksana Shyshkova; Guide: Lada Nesterenko	10km, visually impaired	35:44.3	35:01.4	1+2+0+1	35:01.4	3rd place, bronze medalist(s)
Oksana Shyshkova; Guide: Lada Nesterenko	12.5km, visually impaired	38:35.1	37:48.8	0+0+0+0	37:48.8	3rd place, bronze medalist(s)

== Cross-country skiing ==
Men

Athlete	Event	Qualification			Semifinal		Final		
Athlete	Event	Real Time	Result	Rank	Result	Rank	Real Time	Result	Rank
Oleksandr Korniiko	1km sprint classic, sitting	2:25.99	2:25.99	18	did not qualify				
Oleksandr Korniiko	10km free, sitting	—N/a					35:23.5	35:23.5	20
Anatolii Kovalevskyi; Guide: Oleksandr Mukshyn	10km free, visually impaired	—N/a					26:21.7	25:50.1	12
Vladyslav Maystrenko	1km sprint classic, standing	4:06.86	3:59.45	14	did not qualify				
Vladyslav Maystrenko	10km free, standing	—N/a					28:51.5	27:59.6	26
Ihor Reptyukh	1km sprint classic, standing	3:59.18	3:52.01	11Q	4:20.2	6	did not advance		
Ihor Reptyukh	10km free, standing	—N/a					26:01.4	25:14.6	5
Ihor Reptyukh	20km, standing	—N/a					1:01:38.4	56:05.5	6
Iaroslav Reshetynskiy; Guide: Dmytro Khurtyk	10km free, visually impaired	—N/a					26:15.3	26:15.3	10
Iaroslav Reshetynskiy; Guide: Dmytro Khurtyk	20km, visually impaired	—N/a					59:27.6	59:27.6	9
Dmytro Shulga; Guide: Artur Gergardt	1km sprint classic, visually impaired	3:50.80	3:46.18	6Q	4:21.0	3	did not advance		
Vitalii Sytnyk	10km free, standing	—N/a					27:54.1	26:47.1	19
Vitalii Sytnyk	20km, standing	—N/a					1:05:01.7	58:31.5	9
Mykhaylo Tkachenko	1km sprint classic, sitting	2:15.92	2:15.92	6Q	2:37.3	5	did not advance		
Mykhaylo Tkachenko	10km free, sitting	—N/a					35:22.6	35:22.6	19
Mykhaylo Tkachenko	15km, sitting	—N/a					44:58.8	44:58.8	10
Iurii Utkin; Guide: Vitaliy Kazakov	10km free, visually impaired	—N/a					26:45.8	26:45.8	11
Iurii Utkin; Guide: Vitaliy Kazakov	20km, visually impaired	—N/a					59:06.1	59:06.1	7
Grygorii Vovchynskyi	1km sprint classic, standing	3:52.90	3:45.91	9Q	4:12.7	4	did not advance		
Grygorii Vovchynskyi	10km free, standing	—N/a					26:50.4	26:02.1	16
Maksym Yarovyi	1km sprint classic, sitting	2:28.36	2:07.59	2Q	2:27.5	2Q	2:31.6	2:31.6	3rd place, bronze medalist(s)
Maksym Yarovyi	10km free, sitting	—N/a					36:10.3	31:06.5	2nd place, silver medalist(s)
Maksym Yarovyi	15km, sitting	—N/a					49:00.5	42:08.8	4

Women

Athlete	Event	Qualification			Semifinal		Final		
Athlete	Event	Real Time	Result	Rank	Result	Rank	Real Time	Result	Rank
Iuliia Batenkova	1km sprint classic, standing	4:51.28	4:39.63	3Q	4:46.8	1Q	4:31.4	4:31.4	2nd place, silver medalist(s)
Iuliia Batenkova	5km, standing	—N/a					14:18.8	13:44.4	2nd place, silver medalist(s)
Iuliia Batenkova	15km, standing	—N/a					55:25.7	49:53.1	2nd place, silver medalist(s)
Iryna Bui	1km sprint classic, standing	5:28.19	5:18.34	13	did not qualify				
Iryna Bui	5km, standing	—N/a					16:02.2	15:33.3	11
Olena Iurkovska	1km sprint classic, sitting	2:44.82	2:44.82	11Q	3:05.4	5	did not advance		
Olena Iurkovska	5km, sitting	—N/a					18:23.8	18:23.8	14
Oleksandra Kononova	1km sprint classic, standing	4:41.31	4:32.87	1Q	4:45.7	2Q	4:47.1	4:47.1	5
Oleksandra Kononova	5km, standing	—N/a					14:12.5	13:46.9	3rd place, bronze medalist(s)
Oleksandra Kononova	15km, standing	—N/a					59:08.5	53:49.1	6
Liudmyla Liashenko	1km sprint classic, standing	4:50.31	4:41.60	4Q	4:52.0	4	did not advance		
Liudmyla Liashenko	5km, standing	—N/a					14:29.0	14:02.9	5
Liudmyla Liashenko	15km, standing	—N/a					1:04:18.0	58:30.8	9
Kateryna Pavlenko	15km, standing	—N/a					1:14:10.7	1:07:30.1	10
Lyudmyla Pavlenko	1km sprint classic, sitting	3:06.23	2:55.06	17	did not qualify				
Lyudmyla Pavlenko	5km, sitting	—N/a					17:30.0	16:27.0	2nd place, silver medalist(s)
Lyudmyla Pavlenko	12km, sitting	—N/a					41:23.3	38:54.3	1st place, gold medalist(s)
Olga Prylutska; Guide: Volodymyr Mogylny	5km, visually impaired	—N/a					16:22.5	16:22.5	9
Oksana Shyshkova; Guide: Lada Nesterenko	1km sprint classic, visually impaired	4:43.58	4:37.91	4Q	4:57.7	2Q	4:24.6	4:24.6	3rd place, bronze medalist(s)
Oksana Shyshkova; Guide: Lada Nesterenko	5km, visually impaired	—N/a					14:00.3	13:43.5	4

Relay

Athletes	Event	Final	
Athletes	Event	Time	Rank
Olena Iurkovska; Vitaliy Lukyanenko; Guide: Ihor Reptyukh; Iurii Utkin; Guide: Vitaliy Kazakov	4 x 2.5km open relay	25:17.9	2nd place, silver medalist(s)
Iuliia Batenkova; Guide: Lada Nesterenko; Oleksandra Kononova; Anatolii Kovalevskyi; Guide: Oleksandr Mukshyn; Oleksandr Mukshyn; Guide: Oksana Shyshkova	4 x 2.5km mixed relay	28:09.1	4

== Concerns and controversies ==
Prior to the Games, the Ukrainian territory of Crimea was seized by the Russian military in the wake of the Ukrainian revolution. The Ukraine team still participated in the Games, but Valeriy Sushkevich, head of the country's National Paralympic Committee, warned that "if there is an escalation of the conflict, intervention on the territory of our country, God forbid the worst, we would not be able to stay here. We would go." Similarly to the Olympics, political protests and statements among athletes were forbidden during Paralympic events, although two major, symbolic protests by the Ukrainian team occurred during the Games. During the opening ceremonies, all but one of the country's 31 athletes declined to participate in the parade of nations. The country was represented solely by Nordic skier and flagbearer Mykailo Tkachenko, whose entrance was greeted with an ovation from the audience. Some Ukrainian medalists were seen covering their medal with their hand during ceremonies as another form of silent protest; Sushkevich stated that the covering was "a demonstration that aggression and the high ideals of Paralympic sports are incompatible."

== See also ==
- Ukraine at the 2014 Winter Olympics
