= Biathlon at the 2014 Winter Paralympics =

Biathlon at the XI Paralympic Winter Games
- Venue: Laura Biathlon & Ski Complex, Krasnaya Polyana, Russia
- Dates: 8, 11, and 14 March

Biathlon at the 2014 Winter Paralympics was held at the Laura Biathlon & Ski Complex near Krasnaya Polyana, Russia. The eighteen events took place on 8, 11, and 14 March 2014.

== Events ==
The program included 6 event types (3 for men and 3 for women) that were divided into three classifications each (sitting, standing, and visually impaired), for a total of 18 events. Standing biathletes are those that have a locomotive disability but are able to use the same equipment as able-bodied skiers, whereas sitting competitors use a sitski. Skiers with a visual impairment compete with the help of a sighted guide and an acoustic aiming system. The skier with the visual impairment and the guide are considered a team, and dual medals are awarded.

Men's events

- 7.5 km
- 12.5 km
- 15 km

Women's events

- 6 km
- 10 km
- 12.5 km

== Competition schedule ==
The following is the competition schedule for all events.

All times are (UTC+4).

Date	Time	Event
8 March	10:00	Women's 6 km – Sitting
8 March	10:25	Men's 7.5 km – Sitting
8 March	12:00	Women's 6 km – Standing
8 March	12:15	Men's 7.5 km – Standing
8 March	13:05	Women's 6 km – Visually impaired
8 March	13:44	Men's 7.5 km – Visually impaired
11 March	10:00	Women's 10 km – Sitting
11 March	10:48	Men's 12.5 km – Sitting
11 March	13:00	Women's 10 km – Standing
11 March	13:20	Men's 12.5 km – Standing
11 March	14:30	Women's 10 km – Visually impaired
11 March	14:45	Men's 12.5 km – Visually impaired
14 March	10:00	Men's 15 km – Sitting
14 March	10:20	Women's 12.5 km – Sitting
14 March	12:30	Men's 15 km – Standing
14 March	13:58	Women's 12.5 km – Standing
14 March	15:20	Men's 15 km – Visually impaired
14 March	15:25	Women's 12.5 km – Visually impaired

== Medal summary ==
=== Medal table ===
* Host nation (Russia)

Rank	Nation	Gold	Silver	Bronze	Total
1	Russia (RUS)*	12	11	7	30
2	Ukraine (UKR)	4	3	8	15
3	Germany (GER)	2	1	0	3
4	Norway (NOR)	0	2	0	2
5	Canada (CAN)	0	1	1	2
6	Belarus (BLR)	0	0	2	2
7	Japan (JPN)	0	0	1	1
Totals (7 entries)		18	18	19	55

=== Women's events ===
Event	Class	Gold		Silver		Bronze	
6 kilometres	Visually impaired	Mikhalina Lysova; Guide: Alexey Ivanov; Russia	20:03.2	Iuliia Budaleeva; Guide: Tatiana Maltseva; Russia	20:31.7	Oksana Shyshkova; Guide: Lada Nesterenko; Ukraine	20:49.0
6 kilometres	Sitting	Andrea Eskau; Germany	19:12.4	Svetlana Konovalova; Russia	19:31.1	Olena Iurkovska; Ukraine	19:39.6
6 kilometres	Standing	Alena Kaufman; Russia	18:27.2	Anna Milenina; Russia	18:57.4	Iuliia Batenkova; Ukraine	19:17.7
10 kilometres	Visually impaired	Mikhalina Lysova; Guide: Alexey Ivanov; Russia	30:11.5	Iuliia Budaleeva; Guide: Tatiana Maltseva; Russia	30:38.9	Oksana Shyshkova; Guide: Lada Nesterenko; Ukraine	35:01.4
10 kilometres	Sitting	Anja Wicker; Germany	32:54.4	Svetlana Konovalova; Russia	33:36.7	Lyudmyla Pavlenko; Ukraine	34:22.6
10 kilometres	Standing	Alena Kaufman; Russia	29:57.1	Oleksandra Kononova; Ukraine	30:33.7	Natalia Bratiuk; Russia	30:57.6
12.5 kilometres	Visually impaired	Iuliia Budaleeva; Guide: Tatiana Maltseva; Russia	35:25.9	Mikhalina Lysova; Guide: Alexey Ivanov; Russia	37:21.0	Oksana Shyshkova; Guide: Lada Nesterenko; Ukraine	37:48.8
12.5 kilometres	Sitting	Svetlana Konovalova; Russia	40:44.0	Anja Wicker; Germany	41:27.1	Olena Iurkovska; Ukraine	41:30.8
12.5 kilometres	Standing	Oleksandra Kononova; Ukraine	40:30.6	Alena Kaufman; Russia	40:32.7	Natalia Bratiuk; Russia	41:00.9

=== Men's events ===
Event	Class	Gold		Silver		Bronze	
7.5 kilometres	Visually impaired	Vitaliy Lukyanenko; Guide: Borys Babar; Ukraine	20:18.8	Nikolay Polukhin; Guide: Andrey Tokarev; Russia	20:29.8	Vasili Shaptsiaboi; Guide: Mikhail Lebedzeu; Belarus	21:06.6
7.5 kilometres	Sitting	Roman Petushkov; Russia	21:03.7	Maksym Yarovyi; Ukraine	21:11.9	Kozo Kubo; Japan	21:45.6
7.5 kilometres	Standing	Vladislav Lekomtcev; Russia	19:13.7	Mark Arendz; Canada	19:14.4	Azat Karachurin; Russia	19:14.9
12.5 kilometres	Visually impaired	Vitaliy Lukyanenko; Guide: Borys Babar; Ukraine	31:04.0	Nikolay Polukhin; Guide: Andrey Tokarev; Russia	31:14.3	Vasili Shaptsiaboi; Guide: Mikhail Lebedzeu; Belarus	31:59.0
12.5 kilometres	Sitting	Roman Petushkov; Russia	34:48.8	Alexey Bychenok; Russia	35:29.7	Grigory Murygin; Russia	35:59.6
12.5 kilometres	Standing	Azat Karachurin; Russia	29:30.0	Nils-Erik Ulset; Norway	30:24.6	Mark Arendz; Canada	30:31.0
15 kilometres	Visually impaired	Nikolay Polukhin; Guide: Andrey Tokarev; Russia	36:42.9	Anatolii Kovalevskyi; Guide: Oleksandr Mukshyn; Ukraine	38:18.2	Vitaliy Lukyanenko; Guide: Borys Babar; Ukraine Stanislav Chokhlaev; Guide: Maksim Pirogov; Russia	38:21.6
15 kilometres	Sitting	Roman Petushkov; Russia	42:20.8	Grigory Murygin; Russia	44:25.7	Aleksandr Davidovich; Russia	44:46.2
15 kilometres	Standing	Grygorii Vovchynskyi; Ukraine	37:41.1	Nils-Erik Ulset; Norway	37:44.2	Kirill Mikhaylov; Russia	37:45.6

== See also ==
- Biathlon at the 2014 Winter Olympics
