= Biathlon at the 2014 Winter Paralympics – Women's 12.5 kilometres =

Women's 12.5 km at the XI Paralympic Winter Games
- Paralympic biathlon
- Venue: Laura Biathlon & Ski Complex
- Dates: 14 March

Women's 12.5 km (visually impaired) at the XI Paralympic Winter Games
- Competitors: 6 from 3 nations

Medalists
1st place, gold medalist(s)		Iuliia Budaleeva; Guide: Tatiana Maltseva	Russia
2nd place, silver medalist(s)		Mikhalina Lysova; Guide: Alexey Ivanov	Russia
3rd place, bronze medalist(s)		Oksana Shyshkova; Guide: Lada Nesterenko	Ukraine

Women's 12.5 km (sitting) at the XI Paralympic Winter Games
- Competitors: 9 from 4 nations

Medalists
1st place, gold medalist(s)		Svetlana Konovalova	Russia
2nd place, silver medalist(s)		Anja Wicker	Germany
3rd place, bronze medalist(s)		Olena Iurkovska	Ukraine

Women's 12.5 km (standing) at the XI Paralympic Winter Games
- Competitors: 12 from 7 nations

Medalists
1st place, gold medalist(s)		Oleksandra Kononova	Ukraine
2nd place, silver medalist(s)		Alena Kaufman	Russia
3rd place, bronze medalist(s)		Natalia Bratiuk	Russia

The women's 12.5 km competition of the Sochi 2014 Paralympics was held at Laura Biathlon & Ski Complex near Krasnaya Polyana, Sochi. The competition took place on 14 March.

== Medal table ==
* Host nation (Russia)

Rank	Nation	Gold	Silver	Bronze	Total
1	Russia (RUS)*	2	2	1	5
2	Ukraine (UKR)	1	0	2	3
3	Germany (GER)	0	1	0	1
Totals (3 entries)		3	3	3	9

== Visually impaired ==
In biathlon, visually impaired, the athlete with a visual impairment has a sighted guide. The two skiers are considered a team, and dual medals are awarded.

Rank	Bib	Name	Country	Misses	Real time	Calculated time	Difference
1st place, gold medalist(s)	145	Iuliia Budaleeva; Guide: Tatiana Maltseva	Russia	0+0+0+0	36:09.3	35:25.9	-
2nd place, silver medalist(s)	146	Mikhalina Lysova; Guide: Alexey Ivanov	Russia	0+0+0+1	37:05.5	37:21.0	+1:55.1
3rd place, bronze medalist(s)	143	Oksana Shyshkova; Guide: Lada Nesterenko	Ukraine	0+0+0+0	38:35.1	37:48.8	+2:22.9
4	144	Elena Remizova; Guide: Natalia Yakimova	Russia	0+0+1+0	37:59.4	38:13.8	+2:47.9
5	141	Olga Prylutska; Guide: Volodymyr Mogylnyi	Ukraine	0+1+0+1	44:21.9	46:21.9	+10:56.0
DNF	142	Vivian Hösch; Guide: Norman Schlee	Germany	0+0			

== Sitting ==
Rank	Bib	Name	Country	Misses	Real time	Calculated time	Difference
1st place, gold medalist(s)	109	Svetlana Konovalova	Russia	0+0+0+0	40:44.0	40:44.0	-
2nd place, silver medalist(s)	103	Anja Wicker	Germany	0+0+0+0	46:03.4	41:27.1	+43.1
3rd place, bronze medalist(s)	106	Olena Iurkovska	Ukraine	0+0+0+0	41:30.8	41:30.8	+46.8
4	105	Marta Zaynullina	Russia	1+0+0+0	42:07.4	43:07.4	+2:23.4
5	102	Akzhana Abdikarimova	Russia	0+0+0+0	48:01.3	43:13.2	+2:29.2
6	104	Lyudymyla Pavlenko	Ukraine	1+1+0+0	44:35.5	43:55.0	+3:11.0
7	108	Andrea Eskau	Germany	2+0+0+0	47:08.8	46:19.1	+5:35.1
8	101	Lidziya Hrafeyeva	Belarus	1+0+1+1	44:23.8	47:23.8	+6:39.8
9	107	Nadezda Andreeva	Russia	1+3+2+1	44:03.4	51:03.4	+10:19.4

== Standing ==
Rank	Bib	Name	Country	Misses	Real time	Calculated time	Difference
1st place, gold medalist(s)	130	Oleksandra Kononova	Ukraine	0+0+1+0	40:43.9	40:30.6	-
2nd place, silver medalist(s)	132	Alena Kaufman	Russia	0+0+1+0	40:46.1	40:32.7	+2.1
3rd place, bronze medalist(s)	125	Natalia Bratiuk	Russia	0+0+0+0	42:17.0	41:00.9	+30.3
4	131	Anna Milenina	Russia	0+1+0+1	40:26.9	41:14.1	+43.5
5	124	Liudmyla Liashenko	Ukraine	0+1+0+0	42:45.3	42:28.3	+1:57.7
6	126	Iuliia Batenkova	Ukraine	1+1+0+0	42:11.1	42:29.9	+1:59.3
7	127	Momoko Dekijima	Japan	0+0+0+0	44:28.7	42:42.0	+2:11.4
8	129	Maija Järvelä	Finland	0+0+0+1	43:50.0	43:31.1	+3:00.5
9	128	Iryna Bui	Ukraine	0+0+1+0	43:57.7	43:38.6	+3:08.0
10	122	Pamela Novaglio	Italy	0+0+1+0	46:59.1	46:06.3	+5:35.7
11	123	Larysa Varona	Belarus	0+0+1+0	46:49.4	46:25.1	+5:54.5
12	121	Caroline Bisson	Canada	1+2+0+1	54:32.7	56:21.8	+15:51.2
