= Biathlon at the 2014 Winter Paralympics – Men's 7.5 kilometres =

Men's 7.5 km at the XI Paralympic Winter Games
- Paralympic biathlon
- Venue: Laura Biathlon & Ski Complex
- Dates: March 8

Men's 7.5 km (visually impaired) at the XI Paralympic Winter Games
- Competitors: 18 from 9 nations

Medalists
1st place, gold medalist(s)		Vitaliy Lukyanenko; Guide: Borys Babar	Ukraine
2nd place, silver medalist(s)		Nikolay Polukhin; Guide: Andrey Tokarev	Russia
3rd place, bronze medalist(s)		Vasili Shaptsiaboi; Guide: Mikhail Lebedzeu	Belarus

Men's 7.5 km (sitting) at the XI Paralympic Winter Games
- Competitors: 21 from 10 nations

Medalists
1st place, gold medalist(s)		Roman Petushkov	Russia
2nd place, silver medalist(s)		Maksym Yarovyi	Ukraine
3rd place, bronze medalist(s)		Kozo Kubo	Japan

Men's 7.5 km (standing) at the XI Paralympic Winter Games
- Competitors: 19 from 11 nations

Medalists
1st place, gold medalist(s)		Vladislav Lekomtcev	Russia
2nd place, silver medalist(s)		Mark Arendz	Canada
3rd place, bronze medalist(s)		Azat Karachurin	Russia

The men's 7.5 km competition of the Sochi 2014 Paralympics was held at Laura Biathlon & Ski Complex near Krasnaya Polyana, Sochi. The competition took place on 8 March.

== Medal table ==
* Host nation (Russia)

Rank	Nation	Gold	Silver	Bronze	Total
1	Russia (RUS)*	2	1	1	4
2	Ukraine (UKR)	1	1	0	2
3	Canada (CAN)	0	1	0	1
4	Belarus (BLR)	0	0	1	1
4	Japan (JPN)	0	0	1	1
Totals (5 entries)		3	3	3	9

== Visually Impaired ==
In this event, the athlete with a visual impairment has a sighted guide. The two skiers are considered a team, and dual medals are awarded.

In March 2025, Nikolay Polukhin was found to have committed an anti-doping rule violation in relation to tampering and his result and medal were disqualified. The table below as not yet been adjusted.

Rank	Bib	Name	Country	Misses	Real Time	Calculated Time	Difference
1st place, gold medalist(s)	34	Vitaliy Lukyanenko; Guide: Borys Babar	Ukraine	0+0	20:18.8	20:18.8	—
2nd place, silver medalist(s)	31	Nikolay Polukhin; Guide: Andrey Tokarev	Russia	1+0	20:54.9	20:29.8	+11.0
3rd place, bronze medalist(s)	40	Vasili Shaptsiaboi; Guide: Mikhail Lebedzeu	Belarus	1+0	21:32.4	21:06.6	+47.8
4	37	Iurii Utkin; Guide: Vitaliy Kazakov	Ukraine	0+0	21:14.6	21:14.6	+55.8
5	32	Stanislav Chokhlaev; Guide: Maksim Pirogov	Russia	1+0	24:31.4	21:20.1	+1:01.3
6	35	Anatolii Kovalevskyi; Guide: Oleksandr Mukshyn	Ukraine	0+0	21:47.7	21:21.5	+1:02.7
7	39	Wilhelm Brem; Guide: Florian Grimm	Germany	0+1	25:31.4	22:12.3	+1:53.5
8	33	Zebastian Modin; Guide: Albin Ackerot	Sweden	0+2	25:38.0	22:18.1	+1:59.3
9	43	Alexsander Artemov; Guide: Ilya Cherepanov	Russia	0+0	25:54.7	22:32.6	+2:13.8
10	38	Oleg Ponomarev; Guide: Andrei Romanov	Russia	0+2	22:37.1	22:37.1	+2:18.3
11	41	Iaroslav Reshetynskiy; Guide: Dmytro Khurtyk	Ukraine	0+1	22:55.2	22:55.2	+2:36.4
12	36	Vladimir Udaltcov; Guide: Ruslan Bogachev	Russia	0+2	23:26.6	23:26.6	+3:07.8
13	44	Dmytro Shulga; Guide: Artur Gergardt	Ukraine	1+1	24:48.4	24:18.6	+3:59.8
14	47	Jacob Adicoff; Guide: Reid Pletcher	United States	5+2	25:35.6	25:35.6	+5:16.8
15	45	Thomas Clarion; Guide: Julien Bourla	France	2+5	30:04.3	26:09.7	+5:50.9
16	46	Kevin Burton; Guide: Gregory Rawlings	United States	2+2	27:01.1	26:28.7	+6:09.9
17	48	Kairat Kanafin; Guide: Dmitriy Kolomeyets	Kazakhstan	4+2	29:52.1	29:16.3	+8:57.5
	42	Brian McKeever; Guide: Erik Carleton	Canada	DNS			

== Sitting ==
Rank	Bib	Name	Country	Misses	Real Time	Calculated Time	Difference
1st place, gold medalist(s)	51	Roman Petushkov	Russia	0+0	21:03.7	21:03.7	—
2nd place, silver medalist(s)	55	Maksym Yarovyi	Ukraine	0+0	24:38.9	21:11.9	+8.2
3rd place, bronze medalist(s)	52	Kozo Kubo	Japan	0+0	23:08.9	21:45.6	+41.9
4	56	Andrew Soule	United States	0+0	21:48.5	21:48.5	+44.8
5	54	Alexey Bychenok	Russia	1+0	21:58.2	21:58.2	+54.5
6	59	Dzmitry Loban	Belarus	0+0	22:18.7	22:18.7	+1:15.0
7	58	Ivan Goncharov	Russia	0+0	23:17.3	22:35.4	+1.31.7
8	63	Trygve Steinar Larsen	Norway	0+0	23:00.2	23:00.2	+1:56.5
9	61	Martin Fleig	Germany	0+1	24:03.3	23:20.0	+2:16.3
10	53	Irek Zaripov	Russia	1+3	23:35.8	23:35.8	+2:32.1
11	64	Yauheni Lukyanenka	Belarus	1+1	23:47.5	23:47.5	+2:43.8
12	60	Mykhaylo Tkachenko	Ukraine	0+1	23:58.3	23:58.3	+2:54.6
13	68	Kamil Rosiek	Poland	0+1	24:00.7	24:00.7	+2:57.0
14	57	Daniel Cnossen	United States	3+0	24:13.8	24:13.8	+3:10.1
15	69	Vladimir Gajdiciar	Slovakia	0+0	24:17.8	24:17.8	+3:14.1
16	62	Romain Rosique	France	0+0	26:01.9	24:28.2	+3:24.5
17	67	Oleksandr Korniiko	Ukraine	1+0	24:37.3	24:37.3	+3:33.6
18	66	Jeremy Wagner	United States	0+1	26:16.1	25:28.8	+4:25.1
19	71	Aaron Pike	United States	2+2	26:46.6	25:58.4	+4:54.7
20	70	Travis Dodson	United States	0+5	27:35.2	27:35.2	+6:31.5
	65	Sean Halsted	United States	DSQ			

== Standing ==
Rank	Bib	Name	Country	Misses	Real Time	Calculated Time	Difference
1st place, gold medalist(s)	10	Vladislav Lekomtcev	Russia	0+1	20:01.8	19:13.7	—
2nd place, silver medalist(s)	2	Mark Arendz	Canada	1+0	20:02.5	19:14.4	+0.7
3rd place, bronze medalist(s)	1	Azat Karachurin	Russia	0+1	21:52.4	19:14.9	+1.2
4	7	Kirill Mikhaylov	Russia	1+0	20:02.3	19:26.2	+12.5
5	6	Aleksandr Iaremchuk	Russia	1+0	20:15.8	19:27.2	+13.5
6	3	Nils-Erik Ulset	Norway	0+0	21:52.7	19:28.3	+14.6
7	9	Benjamin Daviet	France	0+1	21:14.5	19:32.5	+18.8
8	5	Grygorii Vovchynskyi	Ukraine	0+1	20:14.8	19:38.4	+24.7
9	11	Ivan Kodlozerov	Russia	1+1	20:16.2	19:39.7	+26.0
10	8	Aleksandr Pronkov	Russia	1+1	22:25.9	19:44.4	+30.7
11	4	Ihor Reptyukh	Ukraine	1+0	20:49.8	20:12.3	+58.6
12	16	Michael Kurz	Austria	1+0	22:50.3	20:33.3	+1:19.6
13	12	Keiichi Sato	Japan	0+0	21:35.3	20:56.4	+1:42.7
14	15	Siarhei Silchanka	Belarus	1+2	22:01.4	21:21.8	+2.08.1
15	14	Vitalii Sytnyk	Ukraine	0+1	22:21.6	21:27.9	+2:14.2
16	13	Vladyslav Maystrenko	Ukraine	2+2	23:51.8	23:08.8	+3:55.1
17	18	Juha Harkonen	Finland	0+1	23:53.2	23:10.2	+3:56.5
18	17	Omar Bermejo	United States	1+0	25:23.8	24:22.8	+5:09.1
19	19	Witold Skupien	Poland	3+4	28:26.4	25:01.6	+5:47.9
