= Biathlon at the 2014 Winter Paralympics – Men's 12.5 kilometres =

Men's 12.5 km at the XI Paralympic Winter Games
- Paralympic biathlon
- Venue: Laura Biathlon & Ski Complex
- Dates: March 11

Men's 12.5 km (visually impaired) at the XI Paralympic Winter Games
- Competitors: 10 from 4 nations

Medalists
1st place, gold medalist(s)		Vitaliy Lukyanenko; Guide: Borys Babar	Ukraine
2nd place, silver medalist(s)		Nikolay Polukhin; Guide: Andrey Tokarev	Russia
3rd place, bronze medalist(s)		Vasili Shaptsiaboi; Guide: Mikhail Lebedzeu	Belarus

Men's 12.5 km (sitting) at the XI Paralympic Winter Games
- Competitors: 19 from 10 nations

Medalists
1st place, gold medalist(s)		Roman Petushkov	Russia
2nd place, silver medalist(s)		Alexey Bychenok	Russia
3rd place, bronze medalist(s)		Grigory Murygin	Russia

Men's 12.5 km (standing) at the XI Paralympic Winter Games
- Competitors: 18 from 11 nations

Medalists
1st place, gold medalist(s)		Azat Karachurin	Russia
2nd place, silver medalist(s)		Nils-Erik Ulset	Norway
3rd place, bronze medalist(s)		Mark Arendz	Canada

The men's 12.5 km competition of the Sochi 2014 Paralympics was held at Laura Biathlon & Ski Complex near Krasnaya Polyana, Sochi. The competition took place on 11 March.

== Medal table ==
* Host nation (Russia)

Rank	Nation	Gold	Silver	Bronze	Total
1	Russia (RUS)*	2	2	1	5
2	Ukraine (UKR)	1	0	0	1
3	Norway (NOR)	0	1	0	1
4	Belarus (BLR)	0	0	1	1
4	Canada (CAN)	0	0	1	1
Totals (5 entries)		3	3	3	9

== Visually Impaired ==
In biathlon, visually impaired, the athlete with a visual impairment has a sighted guide. The two skiers are considered a team, and dual medals are awarded.

In March 2025, Nikolay Polukhin was found to have committed an anti-doping rule violation in relation to tampering and his result and medal were disqualified. The table below as not yet been adjusted.

Rank	Bib	Name	Country	Misses	Real Time	Calculated Time	Difference
1st place, gold medalist(s)	39	Vitaliy Lukyanenko; Guide: Borys Babar	Ukraine	0+0+0+0	31:04.0	31:04.0	-
2nd place, silver medalist(s)	40	Nikolay Polukhin; Guide: Andrey Tokarev	Russia	0+0+1+0	31:52.6	31:14.3	+10.3
3rd place, bronze medalist(s)	33	Vasili Shaptsiaboi; Guide: Mikhail Lebedzeu	Belarus	2+1+0+1	32:38.2	31:59.0	+55.0
4	36	Iurii Utkin; Guide: Vitaliy Kazakov	Ukraine	0+0+0+0	32:04.5	32:04.5	+1:00.5
5	35	Oleg Ponomarev; Guide: Andrei Romanov	Russia	0+0+0+0	32:57.7	32:57.7	+1:53.7
6	32	Iaroslav Reshetynskiy; Guide: Dmytro Khurtyk	Ukraine	0+0+0+0	33:21.9	33:21.9	+2:17.9
7	31	Dmytro Shulga; Guide: Artur Gergardt	Ukraine	0+0+0+0	36:27.7	35:43.9	+4:39.9
DNF	38	Anatolii Kovalevskyi; Guide: Oleksandr Mukshyn	Ukraine	0+0+3			
DNS	34	Wilhelm Brem; Guide: Florian Grimm	Germany				
DNS	37	Vladimir Udaltcov; Guide: Ruslan Bogachev	Russia				

== Sitting ==
Rank	Bib	Name	Country	Misses	Real Time	Calculated Time	Difference
1st place, gold medalist(s)	69	Roman Petushkov	Russia	0+0+0+0	34:48.8	34:48.8	-
2nd place, silver medalist(s)	66	Alexey Bychenok	Russia	0+0+0+0	35:29.7	35:29.7	+40.9
3rd place, bronze medalist(s)	67	Grigory Murygin	Russia	1+0+0+1	35:59.6	35:59.6	+1:10.8
4	62	Ivan Goncharov	Russia	0+0+0+0	37:50.6	36:42.5	+1:53.7
5	64	Andrew Soule	United States	0+0+0+0	37:04.7	37:04.7	+2:15.9
6	68	Kozo Kubo	Japan	0+0+0+0	39:57.8	37:33.9	+2:45.1
7	65	Maksym Yarovyi	Ukraine	0+1+2+3	43:42.6	37:35.4	+2:46.6
8	60	Dzmitry Loban	Belarus	0+0+0+0	37:51.7	37:51.7	+3:02.9
9	58	Martin Fleig	Germany	0+0+1+0	39:25.1	38:14.1	3:25.3
10	59	Mykhaylo Tkachenko	Ukraine	0+1+0+1	38:48.4	38:48.4	+3:59.6
11	63	Daniel Cnossen	United States	1+0+1+1	39:01.0	39:01.0	+4:12.2
12	56	Sean Halsted	United States	0+0+2+1	40:46.1	39:32.7	+4:43.9
13	53	Kamil Rosiek	Poland	0+2+0+1	40:25.0	40:25.0	+5:36.2
14	61	Enzo Masiello	Italy	1+1+1+2	43:02.4	40:27.5	+5:38.7
15	54	Oleksandr Korniiko	Ukraine	0+0+0+2	40:34.2	40:34.2	+5:45.4
16	55	Jeremy Wagner	United States	0+0+1+0	42:06.9	40:51.1	+6:02.3
17	57	Trygve Steinar Larsen	Norway	1+1+2+0	41:18.1	41:18.1	+6:29.3
18	52	Vladimir Gajdiciar	Slovakia	1+1+1+0	41:19.4	41:19.4	+6:30.6
19	51	Augusto Jose Perez	United States	1+0+2+4	48:40.9	48:40.9	+13:52.1

== Standing ==
Rank	Bib	Name	Country	Misses	Real Time	Calculated Time	Difference
1st place, gold medalist(s)	18	Azat Karachurin	Russia	0+0+0+1	33:31.4	29:30.0	-
2nd place, silver medalist(s)	16	Nils-Erik Ulset	Norway	0+0+0+2	34:10.1	30:24.6	+54.6
3rd place, bronze medalist(s)	17	Mark Arendz	Canada	0+0+1+0	31:47.3	30:31.0	+1:01.1
4	11	Aleksandr Pronkov	Russia	0+0+0+2	34:48.3	30:37.7	+1:07.7
5	9	Ivan Kodlozerov	Russia	1+0+0+0	32:04.8	31:07.1	+1:37.1
6	12	Kirill Mikhaylov	Russia	1+0+1+1	32:07.1	31:09.3	+1:39.3
7	14	Grygorii Vovchynskyi	Ukraine	1+0+1+1	32:24.6	31:26.3	+1:56.3
8	13	Aleksandr Iaremchuk	Russia	0+1+0+1	32:48.0	31:29.3	+1:59.3
9	10	Benjamin Daviet	France	1+0+2+0	34:47.8	32:00.8	+2:30.8
10	8	Keiichi Sato	Japan	0+0+1+0	33:40.1	32:39.5	+3:09.5
11	5	Siarhei Silchanka	Belarus	1+1+1+0	34:08.7	33:07.2	+3:37.2
12	15	Ihor Reptyukh	Ukraine	2+1+2+3	34:16.6	33:14.9	+3:44.9
13	6	Vitalii Sytnyk	Ukraine	0+0+0+2	34:39.4	33:16.2	+3:46.2
14	7	Vladyslav Maystrenko	Ukraine	1+2+0+1	34:33.4	33:31.2	+4:01.2
15	4	Michael Kurz	Austria	4+2+0+0	38:42.3	34:50.1	+5:20.1
16	1	Witold Skupien	Poland	3+3+2+1	41:56.4	36:54.4	+7:24.4
17	3	Omar Bermejo	United States	0+1+1+0	38:56.3	37:22.8	+7:52.8
18	2	Juha Harkonen	Finland	3+1+3+0	40:20.4	39:07.8	+9:37.8
