= Biathlon at the 2014 Winter Paralympics – Men's 15 kilometres =

Men's 15 km at the XI Paralympic Winter Games
- Paralympic biathlon
- Venue: Laura Biathlon & Ski Complex
- Dates: March 14

Men's 15 km (visually impaired) at the XI Paralympic Winter Games
- Competitors: 12 from 5 nations

Medalists
1st place, gold medalist(s)		Nikolay Polukhin; Guide: Andrey Tokarev	Russia
2nd place, silver medalist(s)		Anatolii Kovalevskyi; Guide: Oleksandr Mukshyn	Ukraine
3rd place, bronze medalist(s)		Vitaliy Lukyanenko; Guide: Borys Babar	Ukraine
3rd place, bronze medalist(s)		Stanislav Chokhlaev; Guide: Maksim Pirogov	Russia

Men's 15 km (sitting) at the XI Paralympic Winter Games
- Competitors: 22 from 11 nations

Medalists
1st place, gold medalist(s)		Roman Petushkov	Russia
2nd place, silver medalist(s)		Grigory Murygin	Russia
3rd place, bronze medalist(s)		Aleksandr Davidovich	Russia

Men's 15 km (standing) at the XI Paralympic Winter Games
- Competitors: 18 from 10 nations

Medalists
1st place, gold medalist(s)		Grygorii Vovchynskyi	Ukraine
2nd place, silver medalist(s)		Nils-Erik Ulset	Norway
3rd place, bronze medalist(s)		Kirill Mikhaylov	Russia

The men's 15 km competition of the Sochi 2014 Paralympics was held at Laura Biathlon & Ski Complex near Krasnaya Polyana, Sochi. The competition took place on 14 March.

== Medal table ==
* Host nation (Russia)

Rank	Nation	Gold	Silver	Bronze	Total
1	Russia (RUS)*	2	1	3	6
2	Ukraine (UKR)	1	1	1	3
3	Norway (NOR)	0	1	0	1
Totals (3 entries)		3	3	4	10

== Visually Impaired ==
In biathlon, visually impaired, the athlete with a visual impairment has a sighted guide. The two skiers are considered a team, and dual medals are awarded.

In March 2025, Nikolay Polukhin was found to have committed an anti-doping rule violation in relation to tampering and his result and medal were disqualified. The table below as not yet been adjusted.

Rank	Bib	Name	Country	Misses	Real Time	Calculated Time	Difference
1st place, gold medalist(s)	42	Nikolay Polukhin; Guide: Andrey Tokarev	Russia	0+0+0+0	37:27.9	36:42.9	-
2nd place, silver medalist(s)	39	Anatolii Kovalevskyi; Guide: Oleksandr Mukshyn	Ukraine	0+1+0+0	38:03.9	38:18.2	+1:35.3
3rd place, bronze medalist(s)	40	Vitaliy Lukyanenko; Guide: Borys Babar	Ukraine	0+1+0+0	37:21.6	38:21.6	+1:38.7
3rd place, bronze medalist(s)	41	Stanislav Chokhlaev; Guide: Maksim Pirogov	Russia	0+1+0+0	42:56.5	38:21.6	+1:38.7
5	38	Iurii Utkin; Guide: Vitaliy Kazakov	Ukraine	0+0+0+0	39:11.0	39:11.0	+2:28.1
6	35	Vasili Shaptsiaboi; Guide: Mikhail Lebedzeu	Belarus	0+1+1+1	38:16.0	40:30.1	+3:47.2
7	34	Iaroslav Reshetynskiy; Guide: Dmytro Khurtyk	Ukraine	0+0+0+0	41:19.5	41:19.5	+4:36.6
8	33	Alexsander Artemov; Guide: Ilya Cherepanov	Russia	1+0+0+0	46:29.5	41:26.9	+4:44.0
9	36	Wilhelm Brem; Guide: Florian Grimm	Germany	1+0+0+2	45:23.4	42:29.4	+5:46.5
10	37	Oleg Ponomarev; Guide: Andrei Romanov	Russia	1+0+0+1	40:35.0	42:35.0	+5:52.1
11	32	Dmytro Shulga; Guide: Artur Gergardt	Ukraine	0+0+1+0	44:09.1	44:16.1	+7:33.2
12	31	Kevin Burton; Guide: David Chamberlain	United States	2+1+1+2	43:09.8	48:18.0	+11:35.1

== Sitting ==
Rank	Bib	Name	Country	Misses	Real Time	Calculated Time	Difference
1st place, gold medalist(s)	72	Roman Petushkov	Russia	0+0+0+0	42:20.8	42:20.8	-
2nd place, silver medalist(s)	70	Grigory Murygin	Russia	0+1+0+1	44:25.7	44:25.7	+2:04.9
3rd place, bronze medalist(s)	69	Aleksandr Davidovich	Russia	0+0+0+0	44:46.2	44:46.2	+2:25.4
4	67	Andrew Soule	United States	0+0+0+0	44:52.6	44:52.6	+2:31.8
5	65	Ivan Goncharov	Russia	0+0+0+0	46:52.4	45:28.0	+3:07.2
6	71	Kozo Kubo	Japan	0+0+0+0	49:04.1	46:07.5	+3:46.7
7	63	Dzmitry Loban	Belarus	0+0+0+0	46:12.9	46:12.9	+3:52.1
8	61	Martin Fleig	Germany	0+1+0+0	46:43.6	46:19.5	+3:58.7
9	59	Trygve Steinar Larsen	Norway	0+0+0+0	46:58.6	46:58.6	+4:37.8
10	66	Daniel Cnossen	United States	1+1+0+0	46:27.8	48:27.8	+6:07.0
11	57	Sean Halsted	United States	1+0+1+0	47:57.4	48:31.1	+6:10.3
12	68	Maksym Yarovyi	Ukraine	0+1+4+0	51:06.2	48:56.9	+6:36.1
13	55	Oleksandr Korniiko	Ukraine	1+1+0+0	47:17.0	49:17.0	+6:56.2
14	60	Romain Rosique	France	0+0+0+1	51:25.8	49:20.7	+6:59.9
15	62	Mykhaylo Tkachenko	Ukraine	0+1+2+0	46:23.6	49:23.6	+7:02.8
16	53	Vladimir Gajdiciar	Slovakia	0+0+0+1	48:36.7	49:36.7	+7:15.9
17	54	Kamil Rosiek	Poland	1+0+1+2	47:39.7	51:39.7	+9:18.9
18	56	Jeremy Wagner	United States	1+0+1+1	50:55.1	52:23.4	+10:02.6
19	51	Aaron Pike	United States	1+2+2+3	48:29.0	55:01.7	+12:40.9
20	64	Enzo Masiello	Italy	2+3+1+2	50:39.4	55:37.0	+13:16.2
21	52	Travis Dodson	United States	2+0+1+2	50:40.5	55:40.5	+13:19.7
DNF	58	Yauheni Lukyanenka	Belarus	3+2			

== Standing ==
Rank	Bib	Name	Country	Misses	Real Time	Calculated Time	Difference
1st place, gold medalist(s)	14	Grygorii Vovchynskyi	Ukraine	0+0+0+0	38:51.0	37:41.1	-
2nd place, silver medalist(s)	16	Nils-Erik Ulset	Norway	0+0+0+0	42:24.1	37:44.2	+3.1
3rd place, bronze medalist(s)	12	Kirill Mikhaylov	Russia	0+0+0+0	38:55.7	37:45.6	+4.5
4	18	Azat Karachurin	Russia	0+0+1+0	42:17.0	38:12.6	+31.5
5	10	Vladislav Lekomtcev	Russia	0+2+0+0	38:21.2	38:49.2	+1:08.1
6	11	Aleksandr Pronkov	Russia	0+1+0+1	42:06.8	39:03.6	+1:22.5
7	13	Aleksandr Iaremchuk	Russia	1+0+0+1	39:21.3	39:46.8	+2:05.7
8	9	Ivan Kodlozerov	Russia	0+1+0+0	40:19.6	40:07.0	+2:25.9
9	15	Ihor Reptyukh	Ukraine	1+1+1+0	38:20.2	40:11.2	+2:30.1
10	8	Keiichi Sato	Japan	0+0+0+0	41:34.4	40:19.6	+2:38.5
11	17	Mark Arendz	Canada	1+0+0+1	40:10.6	40:34.2	+2:53.1
12	5	Siarhei Silchanka	Belarus	0+0+1+0	40:52.3	40:38.7	+2:57.6
13	6	Vitalii Sytnyk	Ukraine	0+0+0+0	43:33.6	41:49.1	+4:08.0
14	7	Vladyslav Maystrenko	Ukraine	2+0+0+1	43:30.1	45:11.8	+7:30.7
15	2	Juha Harkonen	Finland	1+1+0+1	45:36.9	47:14.8	+9:33.7
16	4	Michael Kurz	Austria	1+4+1+1	46:58.8	49:16.9	+11:35.8
17	3	Omar Bermejo	United States	1+2+0+0	48:17.7	49:21.8	+11:40.7
18	1	Witold Skupien	Poland	5+1+1+1	49:43.2	51:45.2	+14:04.1
