= Poland at the 2014 Winter Paralympics =

- IPC code: POL
- NPC: Polish Paralympic Committee
- Website: www.paralympic.org.pl

in Sochi
- Competitors: 7 in 3 sports
- Medals: Gold 0 Silver 0 Bronze 0 Total 0

Winter Paralympics appearances (overview)
- 1976; 1980; 1984; 1988; 1992; 1994; 1998; 2002; 2006; 2010; 2014; 2018; 2022; 2026

Poland competed at the 2014 Winter Paralympics in Sochi, Russia, held between 7–16 March 2014.

== Alpine skiing ==
Men

| Athlete | Event | Run 1 | | | Run 2 | | | Final/Total | | |
| Athlete | Event | Time | Diff | Rank | Time | Diff | Rank | Time | Diff | Rank |
|---|---|---|---|---|---|---|---|---|---|---|
| Maciej Krezel; Guide: Anna Ogarzynska | Super-G, visually impaired | —N/a | | | | | | 1:27.13 | +6.55 | 7 |
| Maciej Krezel; Guide: Anna Ogarzynska | Combined, visually impaired | 56.49 | +5.89 | 3 | 1:26.09 | +8.63 | 5 | 2:22.58 | +6.71 | 5 |
| Maciej Krezel; Guide: Anna Ogarzynska | Slalom, visually impaired | 53.68 | +3.99 | 9 | 56.26 | +2.74 | 4 | 1:49.94 | +6.73 | 5 |
| Maciej Krezel; Guide: Anna Ogarzynska | Giant slalom, visually impaired | 1:23.62 | +7.60 | 10 | 1:19.02 | +5.77 | 8 | 2:42.64 | +13.02 | 9 |
| Igor Sikorski | Slalom, sitting | 1:12.85 | +20.11 | 25 | 1:10.70 | +11.27 | 13 | 2:23.55 | +29.77 | 13 |
| Igor Sikorski | Giant slalom, sitting | DSQ | | | | | | | | |
| Andrzej Szczesny | Super-G, standing | —N/a | | | | | | DNF | | |
| Andrzej Szczesny | Combined, standing | DNF | | | | | | | | |
| Andrzej Szczesny | Slalom, standing | 53.94 | +6.25 | 15 | 56.41 | +5.13 | 10 | 1:50.35 | +11.38 | 10 |
| Andrzej Szczesny | Giant slalom, standing | 1:29.43 | +14.71 | 28 | 1:22.70 | +11.55 | 22 | 2:52.13 | +26.26 | 22 |
| Rafal Szumiec | Slalom, sitting | DNF | | | | | | | | |
| Rafal Szumiec | Giant slalom, sitting | 1:39.80 | +21.70 | 26 | 1:34.64 | +20.54 | 20 | 3:14.44 | +41.71 | 20 |

=== Snowboarding ===
Para-snowboarding is making its debut at the Winter Paralympics and it will be placed under the Alpine skiing program during the 2014 Games.

Men

| Athlete | Event | Race 1 | | Race 2 | | Race 3 | | Total | |
| Athlete | Event | Time | Rank | Time | Rank | Time | Rank | Time | Rank |
|---|---|---|---|---|---|---|---|---|---|
| Wojciech Taraba | Snowboard cross | 1:09.09 | 19 | 1:01.68 | 14 | 1:00.49 | 10 | 2:02.17 | 15 |

== Biathlon ==
Men

| Athlete | Events | Final | | | | |
| Athlete | Events | Real Time | Calculated Time | Missed Shots | Result | Rank |
|---|---|---|---|---|---|---|
| Kamil Rosiek | 7.5km, sitting | 24:00.7 | 24:00.7 | 0+1 | 24:00.7 | 13 |
| Kamil Rosiek | 12.5km, sitting | 40:25.0 | 40:25.0 | 0+2+0+1 | 40:25.0 | 13 |
| Kamil Rosiek | 15km, sitting | 47:39.7 | 51:39.7 | 1+0+1+2 | 51:39.7 | 17 |
| Witold Skupien | 7.5km, standing | 28:26.4 | 25:01.6 | 3+4 | 25:01.6 | 19 |
| Witold Skupien | 12.5km, standing | 41:56.4 | 36:54.4 | 3+3+2+1 | 36:54.4 | 16 |
| Witold Skupien | 15km, standing | 49:43.2 | 51:45.2 | 5+1+1+1 | 51:45.2 | 18 |

== Cross-country skiing ==
Men

| Athlete | Event | Qualification | | | Semifinal | | Final | | |
| Athlete | Event | Real Time | Result | Rank | Result | Rank | Real Time | Result | Rank |
|---|---|---|---|---|---|---|---|---|---|
| Kamil Rosiek | 1km sprint classic, sitting | 2:23.90 | 2:23.90 | 16 | did not qualify | | | | |
| Kamil Rosiek | 10km free, sitting | —N/a | | | | | 34:36.9 | 34:36.9 | 17 |
| Kamil Rosiek | 15km, sitting | —N/a | | | | | 45:13.1 | 45:13.1 | 11 |
| Witold Skupien | 1km sprint classic, standing | 4:44.46 | 4:10.33 | 18 | did not qualify | | | | |
| Witold Skupien | 10km free, standing | —N/a | | | | | 30:43.8 | 27:02.5 | 20 |

Relay

| Athletes | Event | Final | |
| Athletes | Event | Time | Rank |
|---|---|---|---|
| Kamil Rosiek; Witold Skupien | 4 x 2.5km open relay | 28:01.6 | 6 |

== See also ==
- Poland at the Paralympics
- Poland at the 2014 Winter Olympics
