= 2011 IPC Biathlon and Cross-Country Skiing World Championships – Women's relay =

The Women's 3 x 2.5 kilometre relay in cross-country skiing was held on 9 April 2011. The relay was open for skiers in classification category visual impairment, sitting, and standing. There were only two competing teams, but medals were awarded.

== Results ==
Rank	Bib	Country	Athlete	Time (calculated)	Deficit
1st place, gold medalist(s)	1	Russia	Maria Iovleva, Mikhalina Lysova, Guide: Alexey Ivanov, Elena Remizova, Guide: Natalia Yakimova	19:48.4; 6:48.1; 7:12.8 5:47.5	
2nd place, silver medalist(s)	2	Ukraine	Olena Iurkovska, Oksana Shyshkova, Guide: Volodymyr Ivanov, Oleksandra Kononova	20:40.3; 7:12.0; 7:29.5 5:58.8	+51.9

== See also ==
- FIS Nordic World Ski Championships 2011 – Women's 4 × 5 kilometre relay
