= Japan at the 2014 Winter Paralympics =

- IPC code: JPN
- NPC: Japan Paralympic Committee
- Website: www.jsad.or.jp (in Japanese)

in Sochi
- Competitors: 15 in 3 sports
- Flag bearers: Shoko Ota (opening); Akira Kano (closing)
- Medals Ranked 7th: Gold 3 Silver 1 Bronze 2 Total 6

Winter Paralympics appearances (overview)
- 1976; 1980; 1984; 1988; 1992; 1994; 1998; 2002; 2006; 2010; 2014; 2018; 2022; 2026

Japan competed at the 2014 Winter Paralympics in Sochi, Russia, held between 7–16 March 2014.

== Medalists ==
Medal	Name	Sport	Event	Date
Gold	Akira Kano	Alpine skiing	Men's downhill sitting	8 March
Gold	Akira Kano	Alpine skiing	Men's super-G sitting	9 March
Gold	Takeshi Suzuki	Alpine skiing	Men's slalom sitting	13 March
Silver	Taiki Morii	Alpine skiing	Men's super-G sitting	9 March
Bronze	Takeshi Suzuki	Alpine skiing	Men's downhill sitting	8 March
Bronze	Kozo Kubo	Biathlon	Men's 7.5 kilometres sitting	8 March

== Alpine skiing ==
Men

Athlete	Event	Run 1			Run 2			Final/Total		
Athlete	Event	Time	Diff	Rank	Time	Diff	Rank	Time	Diff	Rank
Toshihiro Abe	Super-G, standing	—N/a						1:27.82	+6.90	12
Toshihiro Abe	Slalom, standing	55.35	+7.66	21	1:02.57	+11.29	20	1:57.92	+18.95	19
Toshihiro Abe	Giant slalom, standing	1:21.54	+6.82	11	1:14.79	+3.64	6	2:36.33	+10.46	6
Akira Kano	Downhill, sitting	—N/a						1:23.80	-	1st place, gold medalist(s)
Akira Kano	Super-G, sitting	—N/a						1:19.51	-	1st place, gold medalist(s)
Akira Kano	Combined, sitting	DNF								
Akira Kano	Slalom, sitting	58.12	+5.38	14	1:01.67	+2.24	4	1:59.79	+6.01	7
Akira Kano	Giant slalom, sitting	DNF								
Gakuta Koike	Downhill, standing	—N/a						DNF		
Gakuta Koike	Super-G, standing	—N/a						1:25.54	+4.62	9
Gakuta Koike	Combined, standing	56.52	+6.22	12	1:22.96	+4.57	9	2:19.48	+9.76	10
Gakuta Koike	Slalom, standing	DNF								
Gakuta Koike	Giant slalom, standing	1:22.73	+8.01	15	1:15.34	+4.19	7	2:38.07	+12.20	9
Hiraku Misawa	Downhill, standing	—N/a						1:28.13	+3.78	9
Hiraku Misawa	Super-G, standing	—N/a						DNF		
Hiraku Misawa	Combined, standing	56.03	+5.73	11	1:22.63	+4.24	8	2:18.66	+8.94	9
Hiraku Misawa	Slalom, standing	DNF								
Hiraku Misawa	Giant slalom, standing	DNF								
Taiki Morii	Downhill, sitting	—N/a						DNF		
Taiki Morii	Super-G, sitting	—N/a						1:21.60	+2.09	2nd place, silver medalist(s)
Taiki Morii	Combined, sitting	59.52	+0.81	3	DNF					
Taiki Morii	Slalom, sitting	56.87	+4.13	8	1:00.87	+1.44	3	1:57.74	+3.96	4
Taiki Morii	Giant slalom, sitting	1:21.26	+3.16	8	1:14.82	+0.72	5	2:36.08	+3.35	7
Kenji Natsume	Downhill, sitting	—N/a						DNF		
Kenji Natsume	Super-G, sitting	—N/a						DNF		
Kenji Natsume	Combined, sitting	1:08.76	+10.05	8	1:19.28	+1.01	3	2:28.04	+9.84	6
Kenji Natsume	Slalom, sitting	1:04.26	+11.52	21	DNF					
Kenji Natsume	Giant slalom, sitting	1:26.20	+8.10	19	1:22.27	+8.17	16	2:48.47	+15.74	10
Takeshi Suzuki	Downhill, sitting	—N/a						1:24.75	+0.95	3rd place, bronze medalist(s)
Takeshi Suzuki	Super-G, sitting	—N/a						DNF		
Takeshi Suzuki	Combined, sitting	DNF								
Takeshi Suzuki	Slalom, sitting	54.35	+1.61	2	59.43	-	1	1:53.78	-	1st place, gold medalist(s)
Takeshi Suzuki	Giant slalom, sitting	1:22.11	+4.01	11	1:16.90	+2.80	10	2:39.01	+6.28	10
Akira Taniguchi	Super-G, sitting	—N/a						DNF		
Akira Taniguchi	Combined, sitting	1:08.60	+9.89	7	1:26.11	+7.84	8	2:34.71	+16.51	7
Akira Taniguchi	Slalom, sitting	DNF								
Akira Taniguchi	Giant slalom, sitting	1:28.31	+10.21	22	DNF					
Masahiko Tokai	Super-G, standing	—N/a						DNS		
Masahiko Tokai	Slalom, standing	53.03	+5.34	14	58.14	+6.86	14	1:51.17	+12.20	11
Masahiko Tokai	Giant slalom, standing	1:21.85	+7.13	12	1:16.27	+5.12	9	2:38.12	+12.25	10
Fukutaro Yamazaki	Slalom, standing	1:05.07	+17.38	35	1:11.29	+20.01	31	2:16.36	+37.39	30
Fukutaro Yamazaki	Giant slalom, standing	1:31.47	+16.75	29	1:27.56	+16.41	27	2:59.03	+33.16	26

Women

Athlete	Event	Run 1			Run 2			Final/Total		
Athlete	Event	Time	Diff	Rank	Time	Diff	Rank	Time	Diff	Rank
Momoka Muraoka	Super-G, sitting	—N/a						DSQ		
Momoka Muraoka	Slalom, sitting	1:29.85	+24.78	9	1:23.16	+18.30	9	2:53.01	+43.08	9
Momoka Muraoka	Giant slalom, sitting	1:37.40	+6.96	6	1:24.32	+4.66	4	3:01.72	+10.46	5
Yoshiko Tanaka	Slalom, sitting	1:18.77	+13.70	7	1:17.02	+12.16	7	2:35.79	+25.86	7
Yoshiko Tanaka	Giant slalom, sitting	1:47.26	+16.82	8	1:33.24	+13.58	8	3:20.50	+29.24	7

== Biathlon ==
Men

Athlete	Events	Final				
Athlete	Events	Real Time	Calculated Time	Missed Shots	Result	Rank
Kozo Kubo	7.5km, sitting	23:08.9	21:45.6	0+0	21:45.6	3rd place, bronze medalist(s)
Kozo Kubo	12.5km, sitting	39:57.8	37:33.9	0+0+0+0	37:33.9	6
Kozo Kubo	15km, sitting	49:04.1	46:07.5	0+0+0+0	46:07.5	6
Keiichi Sato	7.5km, standing	21:35.3	20:56.4	0+0	20:56.4	13
Keiichi Sato	12.5km, standing	33:40.1	32:39.5	0+0+1+0	32:39.5	10
Keiichi Sato	15km, standing	41:34.4	40:19.6	0+0+0+0	40:19.6	10

Women

Athlete	Events	Final				
Athlete	Events	Real Time	Calculated Time	Missed Shots	Result	Rank
Yurika Abe	6km, standing	25:09.7	24:09.3	1+3	24:09.3	13
Momoko Dekijima	6km, standing	21:30.2	20:38.6	1+0	20:38.6	8
Momoko Dekijima	10km, standing	34:44.5	33:21.1	0+1+1+1	33:21.1	9
Momoko Dekijima	12.5km, standing	44:28.7	42:42.0	0+0+0+0	42:42.0	7
Shoko Ota	6km, standing	20:24.2	19:47.5	0+0	19:47.5	6
Shoko Ota	10km, standing	DNS				

== Cross-country skiing ==
Men

Athlete	Event	Qualification			Semifinal		Final		
Athlete	Event	Real Time	Result	Rank	Result	Rank	Real Time	Result	Rank
Keigo Iwamoto	1km sprint classic, standing	5:35.89	4:58.94	32	did not qualify				
Keigo Iwamoto	10km free, standing	—N/a					34:52.9	31:02.7	33
Kozo Kubo	10km free, sitting	—N/a					33:40.4	31:39.2	5
Kozo Kubo	15km, sitting	—N/a					48:59.4	46:03.0	14
Yoshihiro Nitta	1km sprint classic, standing	4:02.51	3:55.24	12Q	4:21.2	6	did not advance		
Yoshihiro Nitta	10km free, standing	—N/a					27:02.5	26:13.8	17
Yoshihiro Nitta	20km, standing	—N/a					59:31.7	54:10.2	4
Keiichi Sato	1km sprint classic, standing	4:25.98	4:18.00	22	did not qualify				
Keiichi Sato	10km free, standing	—N/a					28:10.9	27:20.2	22

Women

Athlete	Event	Qualification			Semifinal		Final		
Athlete	Event	Real Time	Result	Rank	Result	Rank	Real Time	Result	Rank
Yurika Abe	1km sprint classic, standing	5:13.01	5:00.49	9Q	5:12.8	5	did not advance		
Yurika Abe	5km, standing	—N/a					15:38.1	15:00.6	9
Yurika Abe	15km, standing	—N/a					1:02:14.9	56:01.4	8
Momoko Dekijima	1km sprint classic, standing	5:18.33	5:05.60	10Q	5:12.5	5	did not advance		
Momoko Dekijima	5km, standing	—N/a					15:04.7	14:28.5	6
Mayuko Eno	1km sprint classic, sitting	3:32.11	3:25.75	21	did not qualify				
Mayuko Eno	5km, sitting	—N/a					24:17.3	23:33.6	21
Shoko Ota	1km sprint classic, standing	4:56.12	4:47.24	7Q	4:50.0	4	did not advance		
Shoko Ota	5km, standing	—N/a					15:31.9	15:03.9	10

Relay

Athletes	Event	Final	
Athletes	Event	Time	Rank
Momoko Dekijima; Kozo Kubo; Yoshihiro Nitta; Shoko Ota	4 x 2.5km mixed relay	29:25.6	7

== See also ==
- Japan at the Paralympics
- Japan at the 2014 Winter Olympics
