= Roman Petushkov =

Russian biathlete

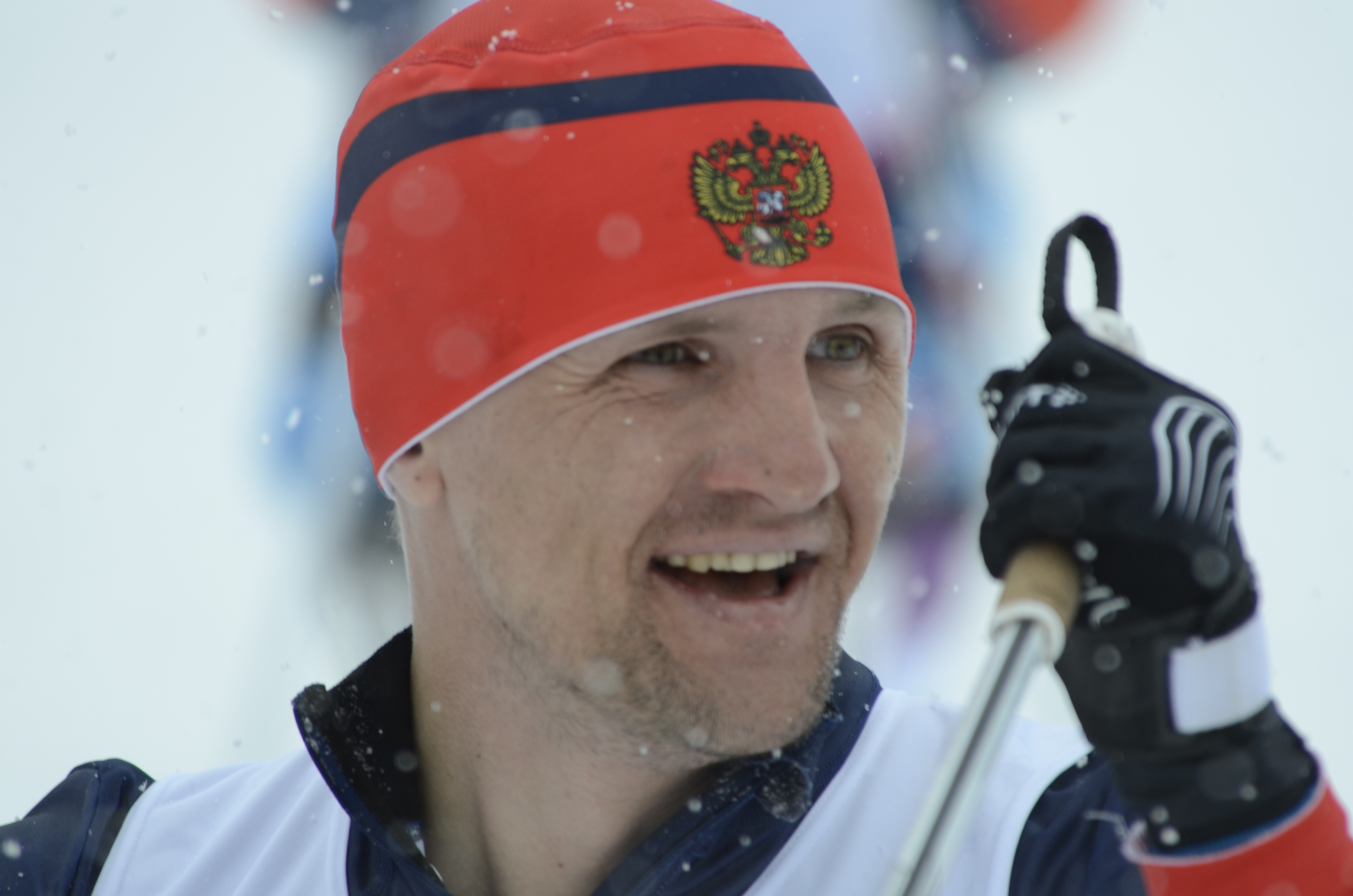

Personal information
- Full name: Roman Aleksandrovich Petushkov
- Born: 18 February 1978 (age 48) Moscow, Russia

Sport
- Sport: Skiing
Medal record
Representing Russia
Paralympic Games
Men's para cross-country skiing
Silver medal – second place	2010 Vancouver	15 km, sitting
Gold medal – first place	2014 Sochi	4 x 2.5 km open relay
Gold medal – first place	2014 Sochi	15 km, sitting
Gold medal – first place	2014 Sochi	1 km, sitting
Men's para biathlon
Bronze medal – third place	2010 Vancouver	12.5 km, sitting
Gold medal – first place	2014 Sochi	15 km, sitting
Gold medal – first place	2014 Sochi	12.5 km, sitting
Gold medal – first place	2014 Sochi	7.5 km, sitting
World Championships
Silver medal – second place	2009 Vuokatti	1 km, sitting
Gold medal – first place	2009 Vuokatti	15 km, sitting
Gold medal – first place	2009 Vuokatti	10 km, sitting
Gold medal – first place	2013 Sollefteå	4 x 2.5 km open relay, sitting
Gold medal – first place	2013 Sollefteå	15 km, sitting
Gold medal – first place	2013 Sollefteå	10 km, sitting
Gold medal – first place	2013 Sollefteå	1 km, sitting

Roman Aleksandrovich Petushkov (Russian: Роман Александрович Петушков; born 18 February 1978) is a Russian cross-country skier, biathlete, and Paralympian. He competes in classification category sitting events.

== Career ==
Petushkov participated at the 2010 Winter Paralympics in cross-country skiing and biathlon. In cross-country skiing, he took the silver in the 15 km, sitting. He placed 5th in the 1 km sprint and 5th in the 10 km, sitting. In biathlon, he took the bronze medal in the 12.5 km individual, sitting. He placed 20th in the men's 2.4 km pursuit, sitting. In 2014 he competed at the Paralympic Games where he won six gold medals.

After his success at the 2014 Winter Games, Petushkov received numerous national and international awards and honors. In 2015, he was nominated Sportsperson of the Year with a Disability. For his performance at the 2014 Games, Petushkov was awarded Best Male at the Paralympic Sports Awards.

== Awards ==
- Order "For Merit to the Fatherland", 4th class (2014)
- Medal of the Order "For Merit to the Fatherland", 2nd class (26 March 2010) — for his contribution to the development of physical culture and sports at the 10th Paralympic Games in 2010 in Vancouver (Canada)
- Merited Master of Sports of Russia
- "Sportsman of the Month" (International Paralympic Committee, in January 2012 and February 2013)
- Laureate of "Quirk of Fate" (Russian Paralympic Committee, 2013)
