= Svetlana Konovalova =

Russian cross-country skier and biathlete

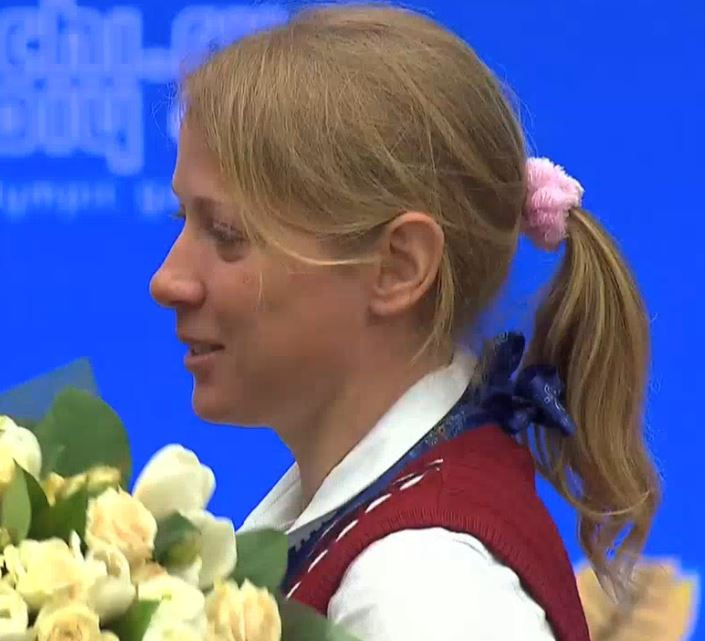
- Konovalova at the 2014 Winter Paralympics.

Personal information
- Full name: Svetlana Igorevna Konovalova
- Born: 10 February 1990 (age 36)

Sport

Professional information
- Sport: Biathlon; Cross-country skiing

Paralympic Games
- Teams: 1 (2014); 1 (2014)
- Medals: 3 (1 gold); 1 (0 gold)
Medal record
Women's biathlon
Representing Russia
Paralympic Games
Gold medal – first place	2014 Sochi	12.5 km
Silver medal – second place	2014 Sochi	6 km
Silver medal – second place	2014 Sochi	10 km
Women's cross-country skiing
Paralympic Games
Bronze medal – third place	2014 Sochi	12 km

Svetlana Igorevna Konovalova (Russian: Светлана Игоревна Коновалова; born 10 February 1990) is a Russian paralympic cross-country skier from Ryazan, Russia who won silver medal at the IPC Biathlon and Cross-Country Skiing World Championships, which were hosted at the 2014 Paralympics in Sochi, on 8 March 2014. On 20 March 2014 she won a gold medal in 12 km sitting biathlon competition by beating Germany's Anja Wicker by 43.1 seconds.
