= Azat Karachurin =

Russian Paralympic biathlete

Personal information
- Full name: Azat Karachurin

Sport

Professional information
- Sport: Biathlon

Paralympic Games
- Teams: 1 (2014)
- Medals: 2 (1 gold)
Medal record
Men's biathlon
Representing Russia
Paralympic Games
Gold medal – first place	2014 Sochi	Men's 12.5 km
Bronze medal – third place	2014 Sochi	Men's 7.5 km

Azat Karachurin is a Russian Paralympic biathlete who won gold medal for the 12.5 km standing event despite missing one target on March 11, 2014, at the 2014 Winter Paralympics in Sochi, Russia. After the event, he received congratulations from the Russian President Vladimir Putin who said that his hard work earned him a medal. He was also a winner of bronze medal for the 7.5 km biathlon race in the same place.
