= Stanislav Chokhlaev =

Russian Para cross-country skier and biathlete (born 1989)

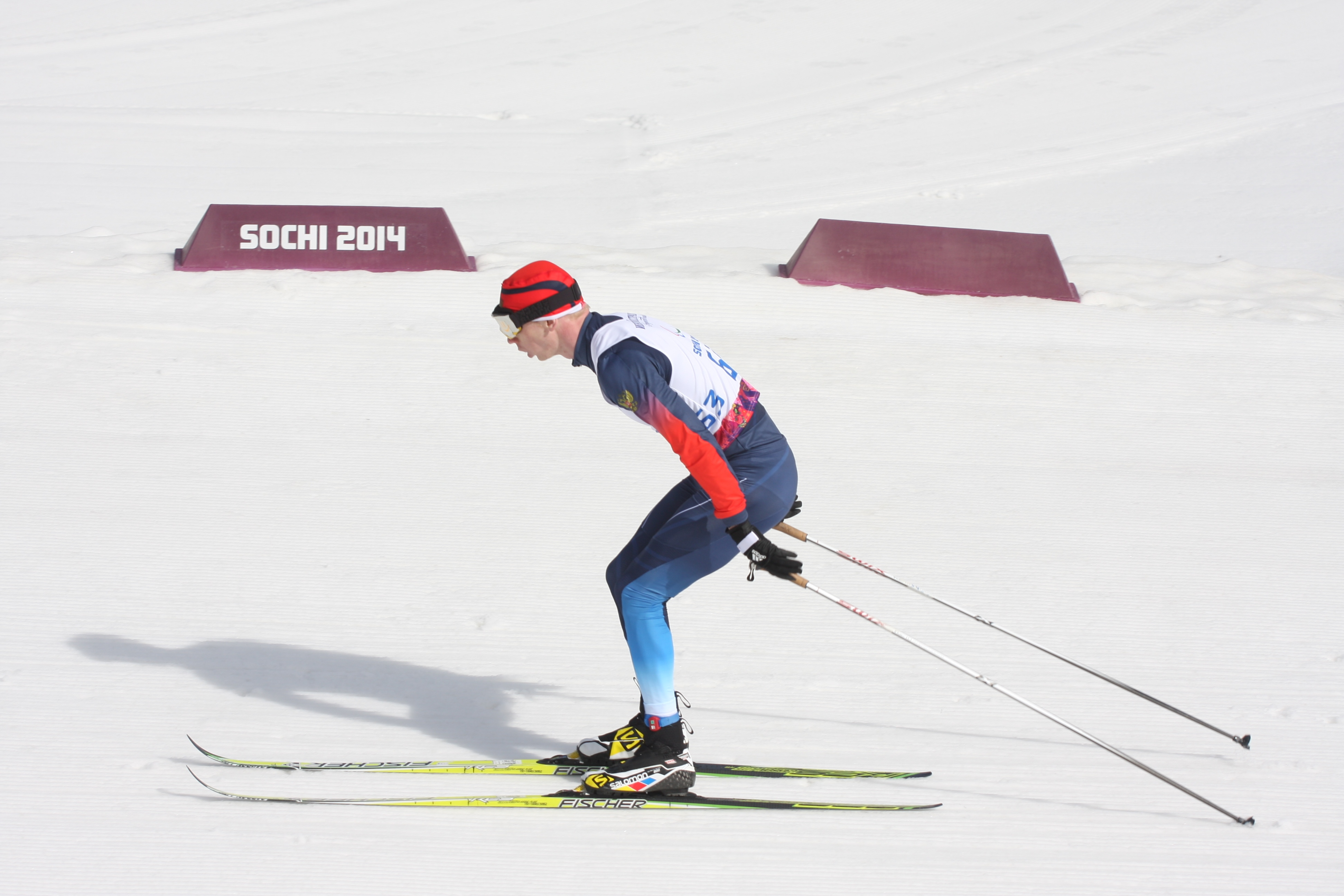
- Chokhlaev in 2014

Personal information
- Nationality: Russian
- Born: 16 July 1989 (age 37) Serga, Soviet Union
- Spouse: Iuliia Budaleeva

Sport
- Country: Russia
- Sport: Para Nordic skiing (Para cross-country skiing and Para biathlon)
- Disability class: B1
- Partner: Maksim Pirogov (guide)
- Coached by: Vyacheslav Goldinov
Medal record
Representing Russia
Winter Paralympics
Men's Para cross-country skiing
| Silver medal – second place | Sochi 2014 | 20km free |
| Silver medal – second place | Sochi 2014 | 10km visually impaired |
Men's Para biathlon
| Bronze medal – third place | Sochi 2014 | 15km visually impaired |

Stanislav Chokhlaev (born 16 July 1989) is a Russian male visually impaired Para cross-country skier and biathlete. He represented Russia at the 2014 Winter Paralympics and was successful in his first Paralympic competition, claiming three medals including 2 silver medals in the cross-country skiing event. In 2017, he was awarded the Return to Life Prize by the Russian Paralympic Committee.

== Career ==
Stanislav Chokhlaev competed at the 2014 Winter Paralympics with his guide Maksim Pirogov and went onto claim 2 medals in the cross-country skiing events and a bronze medal in the biathlon event.

He won the silver medal in the men's 12.5 km visually impaired cross-country skiing event at the 2021 World Para Snow Sports Championships held in Lillehammer, Norway. He also won the silver medal in the men's long-distance visually impaired cross-country skiing event. In biathlon, he won the silver medal in the men's 6 km visually impaired event. He also won the silver medal in the men's 10 km visually impaired biathlon event.

== Personal life ==
Stanislav married fellow Russian visually impaired Para Nordic skier, Iuliia Budaleeva. Iuliia Budaleeva also competed at the 2014 Winter Paralympics and excelled at her first Paralympic event similar to that of her husband by claiming three medals including a gold medal and two silver medals in the biathlon events and a bronze medal in cross-country skiing event.
