= Oksana Shyshkova =

Ukrainian Para cross-country skier and biathlete (born 1991)

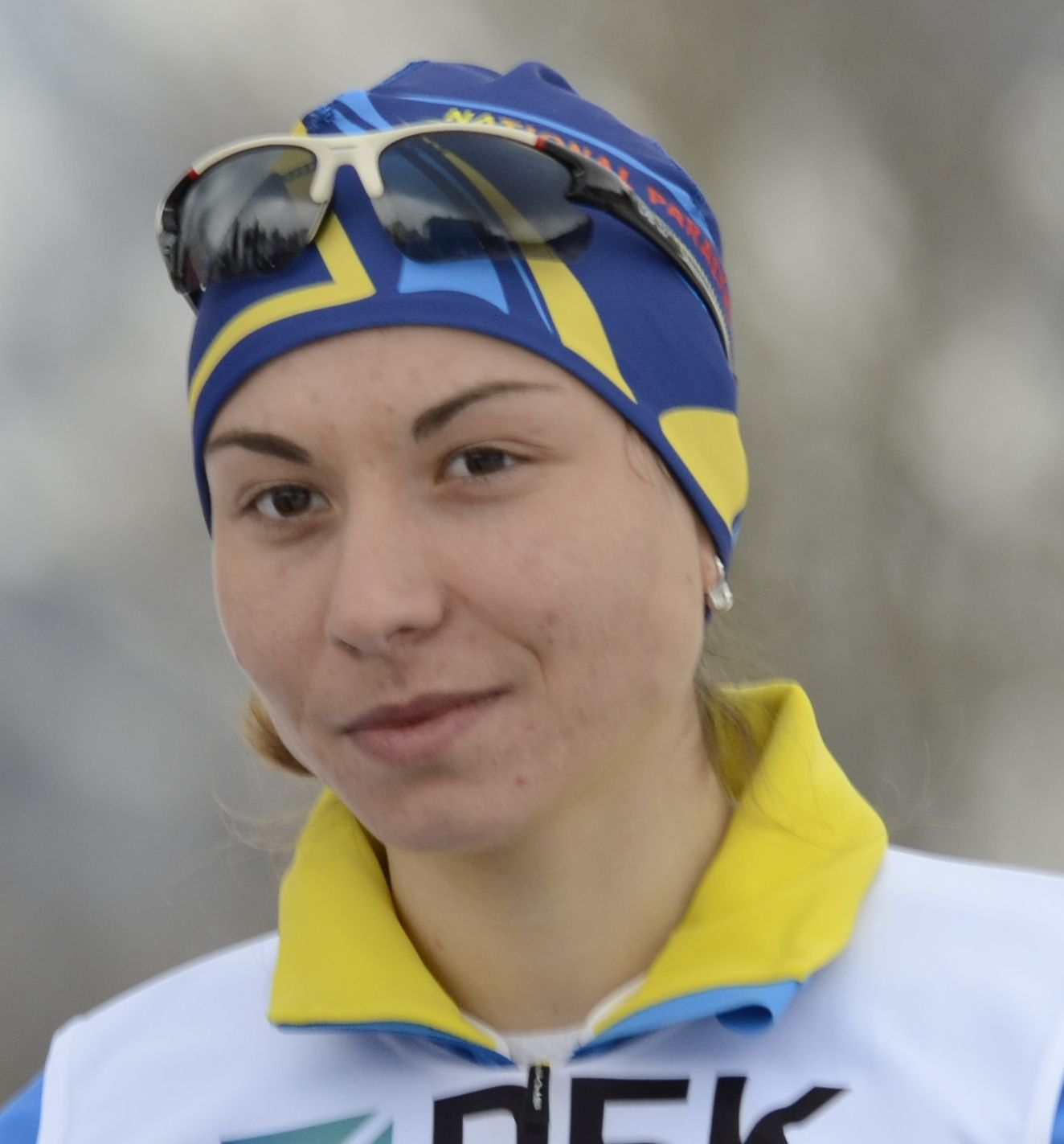
- Shyshkova (2014)

Personal information
- Nationality: Ukrainian
- Born: 10 June 1991 (age 35) Kharkov (now Kharkiv), Soviet Union

Sport
- Country: Ukraine
- Sport: Para Nordic skiing (Para cross-country skiing and Para biathlon)
- Disability class: B2
- Partner: Lada Nesterenko
Medal record
Representing Ukraine
Winter Paralympics
Women's Para biathlon
Gold medal – first place	2018 Pyeongchang	10km visually impaired
Gold medal – first place	2022 Beijing	6km visually impaired
Gold medal – first place	2022 Beijing	12.5km visually impaired
Silver medal – second place	2018 Pyeongchang	6km visually impaired
Silver medal – second place	2022 Beijing	10km visually impaired
Bronze medal – third place	2014 Sochi	6km visually impaired
Bronze medal – third place	2014 Sochi	10km visually impaired
Bronze medal – third place	2014 Sochi	12.5km visually impaired
Women's Para cross-country skiing
Gold medal – first place	2018 Pyeongchang	4 x 2.5 km Mixed Relay
Gold medal – first place	2022 Beijing	15km classical visually impaired
Silver medal – second place	2018 Pyeongchang	15km free visually impaired
Silver medal – second place	2022 Beijing	1.5km sprint
Bronze medal – third place	2014 Sochi	1km sprint classic visually impaired
Bronze medal – third place	2018 Pyeongchang	1.5km sprint classical visually impaired
World Championships
Women's Para cross-country skiing
Gold medal – first place	2017 Finsterau	7.5km free visually impaired
Gold medal – first place	2019 Prince George	7.5km free visually impaired
Silver medal – second place	2011 Khanty-Mansiysk	1km sprint classic visually impaired
Silver medal – second place	2011 Khanty-Mansiysk	3 x 2.5 km Relay
Silver medal – second place	2017 Finsterau	12km classical visually impaired
Silver medal – second place	2017 Finsterau	7.5km sprint classical visually impaired
Silver medal – second place	2019 Prince George	15km classical visually impaired
Bronze medal – third place	2023 Östersund	18km classical visually impaired
Women's Para biathlon
Gold medal – first place	2017 Finsterau	10km visually impaired
Gold medal – first place	2017 Finsterau	6km visually impaired
Silver medal – second place	2011 Khanty-Mansiysk	12.5km visually impaired
Silver medal – second place	2011 Khanty-Mansiysk	3.6km visually impaired
Silver medal – second place	2017 Finsterau	12km visually impaired
Silver medal – second place	2019 Prince George	6km visually impaired
Silver medal – second place	2019 Prince George	10km visually impaired
Silver medal – second place	2019 Prince George	12.5km visually impaired
Silver medal – second place	2023 Östersund	10km visually impaired

Oksana Shyshkova (born 10 June 1991) is a Ukrainian visually impaired Para cross-country skier and biathlete. She has competed at the Winter Paralympics thrice in 2010, 2014 and 2018. Oksana Shyshkova claimed 6 medals at the 2017 IPC World Championships, which is her notable achievement in the sport of Nordic skiing. She competed at the 2022 Winter Paralympics, winning a gold medal, in Women's 6 kilometres.

She claimed her first Paralympic gold medal after clinching a gold medal in the women's 10km visually impaired biathlon event as a part of the 2018 Winter Paralympics.

== Career ==
Oksana made her Paralympic debut during the 2010 Winter Paralympics representing Ukraine and went medalless at the event. She then went onto compete at the 2014 Winter Paralympics and claimed 4 bronze medals in the Winter Paralympic event including 3 in the biathlon events and a solitary medal in the cross-country skiing event with the assistance of her sighted guide, Lada Nesterenko.

Oksana Shyshkova claimed a silver medal in the women's 6km visually impaired biathlon event during the 2018 Winter Paralympics, which is also her first Paralympic silver medal and also her fifth medal in her Paralympic career.
