= Iuliia Budaleeva =

Russian Para cross-country skier and biathlete (born 1990)

Personal information
- Nationality: Russian
- Born: 13 November 1990 (age 35)
- Spouse: Stanislav Chokhlaev

Sport
- Country: Russian
- Sport: Para Nordic skiing (Para cross-country skiing and Para biathlon)
- Disability class: B2
- Partner: Tatiana Maltseva (guide)
- Coached by: Vyacheslav Goldinov
Medal record
Representing Russia
Winter Paralympics
Women's Para biathlon
Gold medal – first place	2014 Sochi	12.5km visually impaired
Silver medal – second place	2014 Sochi	6km visually impaired
Silver medal – second place	2014 Sochi	10km visually impaired
Women's Para cross-country skiing
Bronze medal – third place	2014 Sochi	5km visually impaired

Iuliia Budaleeva (born 13 November 1990), also known as Iuliia Chokhlaeva, is a Russian female visually impaired Para cross-country skier and biathlete. She represented Russia at the 2014 Winter Paralympics and was successful in her first Paralympic competition, claiming four medals including a gold medal in the biathlon event. Iuliia Budaleeva was awarded the Order of Friendship by the Russian president, Vladimir Putin for her performance at the 2014 Winter Paralympics.

== Career ==
Iuliia Budaleeva competed at the 2014 Winter Paralympics with her guide Tatiana Maltseva and went onto claim 3 medals in the biathlon events including a gold medal in the women's 12.5km biathletes event and two silver medals in women's 6km event and women's 10km event. She also clinched a bronze medal in the women's 5km cross-country skiing event as a part of the 2014 Winter Paralympics.

== Personal life ==
Iuliia Budaleeva married fellow Russian visually impaired Para Nordic skier, Stanislav Chokhlaev. Stanislav Chokhlaev also competed at the 2014 Winter Paralympics and excelled at his first Paralympic event similar to that of his wife by claiming two silver medals in the cross-country skiing and a bronze medal in biathlon events.
