= Alena Kaufman =

Russian paralympic biathlete and skier (born 1987)

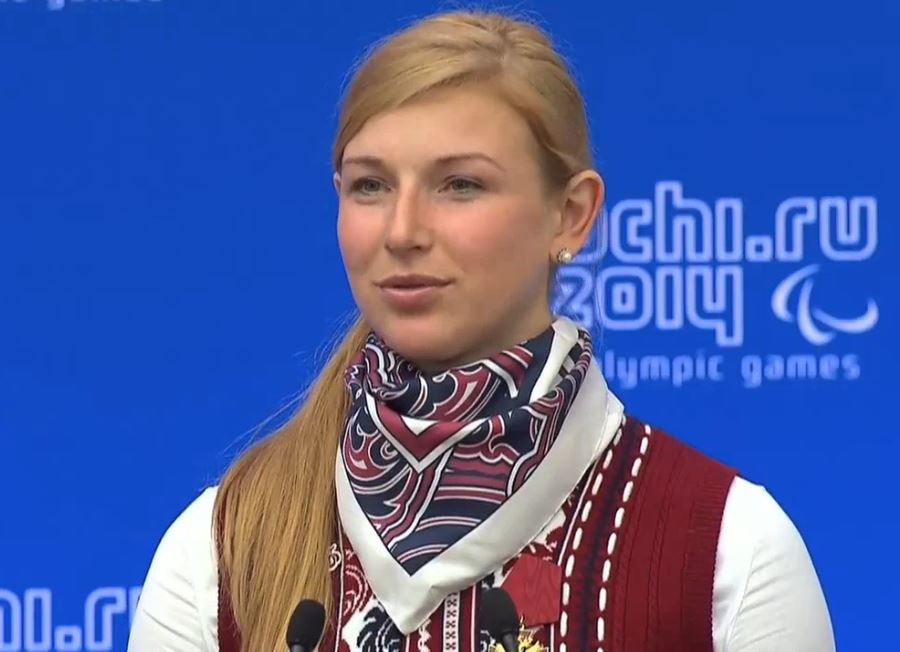
- Kaufman at the 2014 Winter Paralympics.

Personal information
- Full name: Alena Vladimirovna Kaufman
- Born: 30 June 1987 (age 39)

Sport

Professional information
- Sport: Biathlon; Cross-country skiing

Paralympic Games
- Teams: 3 (2006, 2010, 2014); 3 (2006, 2010, 2014)
- Medals: 3 (2 gold)
Medal record
Representing Russia
Women's biathlon
Paralympic Games
Gold medal – first place	2014 Sochi	6 km
Gold medal – first place	2014 Sochi	10 km
Silver medal – second place	2014 Sochi	12.5 km
Women's paratriathlon
European Championships
Bronze medal – third place	2013 Alanya	TRI 4

Alena Kaufman (Алена Владимировна Кауфман) is a Russian paralympic biathlete and skier who won two gold medals at the Sochi Paralympic Games for 6, and 10 km race respectively. On March 12, 2014, she was congratulated by the Russian President Vladimir Putin for winning a bronze medal in 1 km cross-country skiing. Previously, she also was a gold medalist at the 2006 and bronze one at the 2010 Winter Paralympics.
