= Anatolii Kovalevskyi =

Ukrainian Para cross-country skier and biathlete (born 1990)

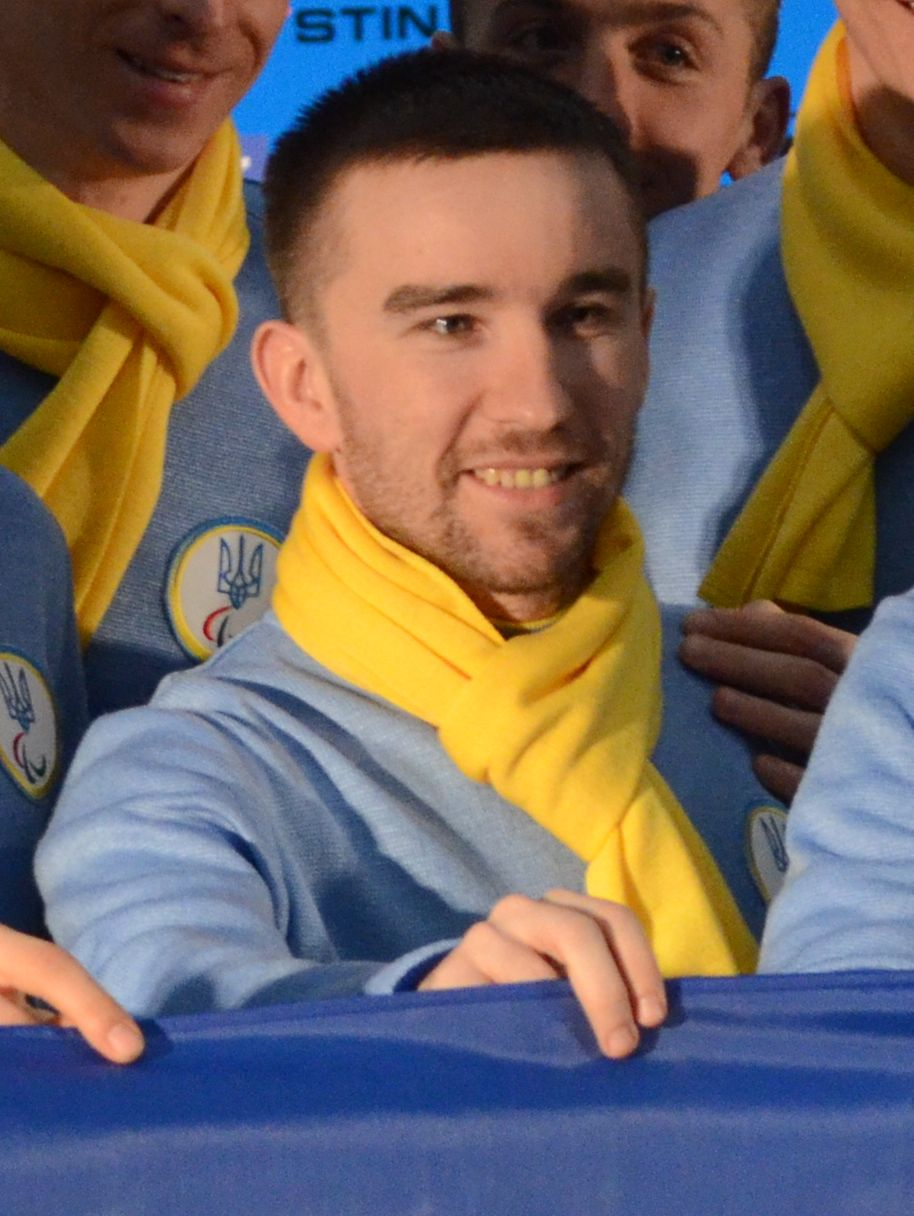
- Kovalevskyi in 2018

Personal information
- Nationality: Ukrainian
- Born: 24 June 1990 (age 36) Kyiv, Soviet Union
- Height: 1.70 m (5 ft 7 in)
- Weight: 68 kg (150 lb)

Sport
- Country: Ukraine
- Sport: Para Nordic skiing (Para cross-country skiing and Para biathlon)
- Disability class: B2 (visually impaired)
- Coached by: Ganna Glukhykh
Medal record
Representing Ukraine
Winter Paralympics
Men's Para biathlon
Silver medal – second place	2014 Sochi	15km individual
Silver medal – second place	2022 Beijing	10km
Bronze medal – third place	2018 Pyeongchang	7.5km
Bronze medal – third place	2026 Milano Cortina	Sprint
Bronze medal – third place	2026 Milano Cortina	Sprint pursuit
Men's Para cross-country skiing
Gold medal – first place	2022 Beijing	4 × 2.5 km open relay

Anatolii Kovalevskyi (born 24 June 1990) is a Ukrainian male visually impaired Para cross-country skier and biathlete. He represented Ukraine at the 2014 Winter Paralympics and competed in the men's cross-country skiing and biathlon events. Anatolii Kovalevskyi also went onto represent Ukraine at the 2018 Winter Paralympics and secured a bronze medal in the men's 7.5km visually impaired biathlon event.

== Career ==
He took the sport of Para Nordic skiing in 2009 and he was formerly coached by his own father, Ganna Glukhykh. He earned the opportunity to compete at the 2014 Winter Paralympics representing Ukraine, which was his maiden call-up to compete at the Paralympics. He secured a silver medal in the men's 15km visually impaired biathlon event with his sighted guide, Oleksandr Mukshyn.
