= Anja Wicker =

German Para cross-country skier and biathlete (born 1991)

Personal information
- Born: 22 December 1991 (age 34) Stuttgart, Germany
- Years active: 2010-present
- Website: anja-wicker.de

Sport
- Country: Germany
- Sport: Para Nordic skiing (Para cross-country skiing and Para biathlon)
- Disability class: LW10
Medal record
Representing Germany
Women's Para biathlon
Winter Paralympics
| Gold medal – first place | 2014 Sochi | 10km sitting |
| Silver medal – second place | 2014 Sochi | 12.5km sitting |
| Silver medal – second place | 2026 Milano Cortina | 12.5km sitting |
| Bronze medal – third place | 2022 Beijing | 10km sitting |
| Bronze medal – third place | 2026 Milano Cortina | Sprint sitting |
| Bronze medal – third place | 2026 Milano Cortina | Sprint pursuit sitting |
Women's Para cross-country skiing
Winter Paralympics
| Silver medal – second place | 2026 Milano Cortina | 20 km sitting |

Anja Wicker (born 22 December 1991) is a German disabled Para cross-country skier and biathlete. She represented Germany at the 2014 Winter Paralympics claiming a gold and a silver medal in the biathlon events. She also represented Germany at the 2018 and 2022 Winter Paralympics.

Wicker was also the recipient of the Silver Laurel Leaf, the highest sport award in Germany.

== Career ==
Anja Wicker took the sport of Nordic skiing in 2006 and started to compete in international arena from 2010. She was qualified to compete at the 2014 Winter Paralympics, which was her first Paralympic event and participated in the cross-country skiing and biathlon events. She claimed her first gold medal in the women's 10km sitting biathlon event and also clinched a silver medal at the 2014 Winter Paralympics in the women's 12.5km sitting biathlon event while the gold medal was claimed by Svetlana Konovalova of Russia in the relevant event.

She won the gold medal in the women's 6 km sitting biathlon event at the 2021 World Para Snow Sports Championships held in Lillehammer, Norway. She also won the bronze medal in the women's 7.5 km sitting cross-country skiing event.
