= Natalia Bratiuk =

Russian cross-country skier and biathlete

Personal information
- Born: 15 July 1986 (age 39)

Sport
- Sport: Biathlon
Medal record
Women's para biathlon
Representing Russia
Paralympic Games
Bronze medal – third place	2014 Sochi	10 km biathlon standing

Natalia Bratiuk (Russian: Наталья Братюк, born 15 July 1986) is a Russian Paralympic cross country skier and biathlete who won bronze medal at the 2014 Winter Paralympics in Sochi, Russia. In 2013, she was silver medalist at IPC Biathlon and Cross-Country Skiing World Championships. She participated in the 2018 Winter Paralympics, finishing sixth.
