= Olena Iurkovska =

Ukrainian Paralympic athlete (born 1983)

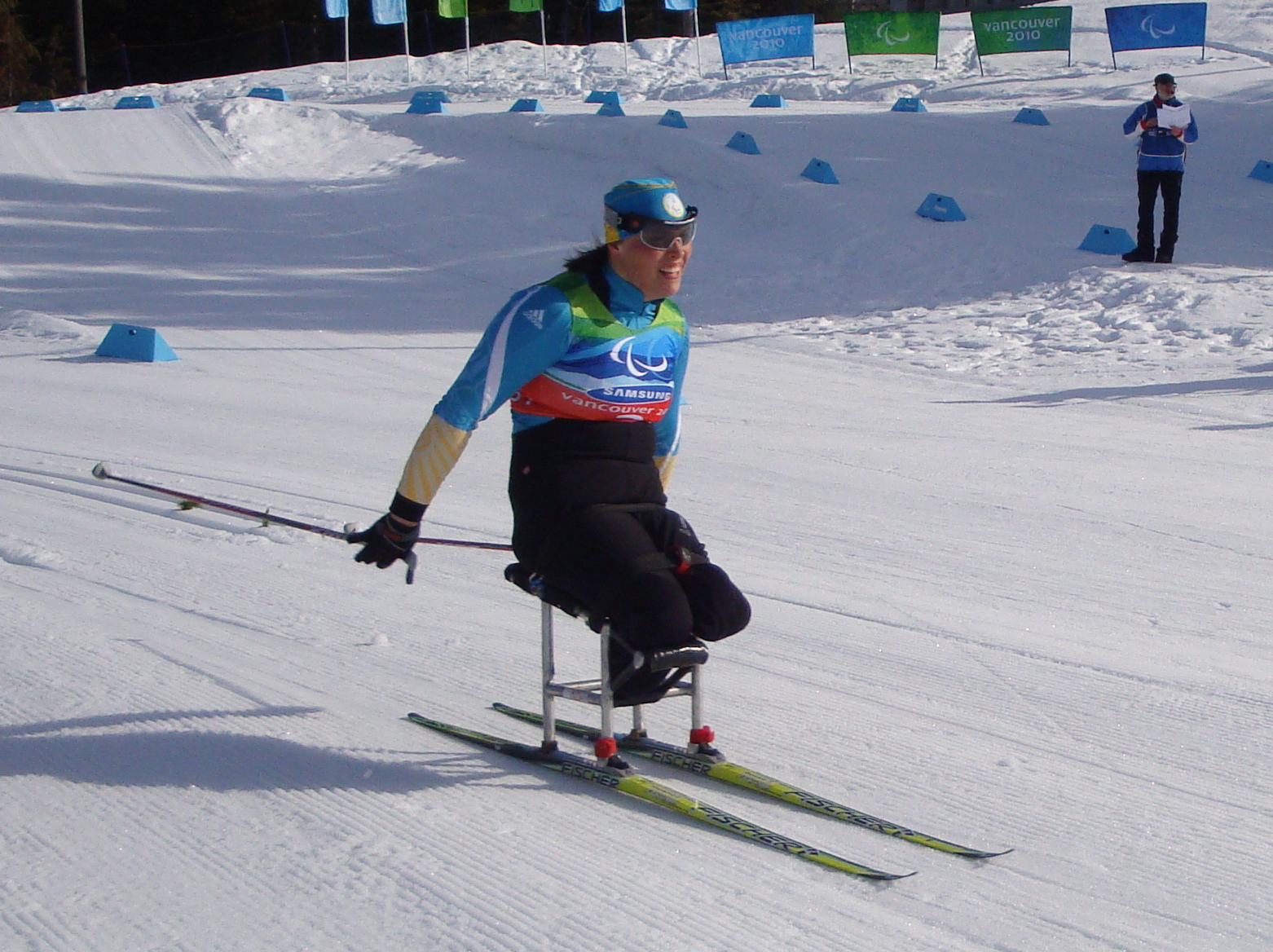

Personal information
- Born: 27 September 1983 (age 42) Kolomyia, Ukrainian SSR, Soviet Union

Sport
- Sport: Skiing
Medal record
Representing Ukraine
Paralympic Games
Biathlon
Gold medal – first place	2006 Turin	10km, sitski
Gold medal – first place	2006 Turin	7.5km, sitski
Gold medal – first place	2010 Vancouver	2.4km pursuit, sitting
Silver medal – second place	2002 Salt Lake City	7.5km, sitski
Silver medal – second place	2010 Vancouver	10km, sitting
Bronze medal – third place	2014 Sochi	6km, sitting
Bronze medal – third place	2014 Sochi	12.5km, sitting
Cross-country skiing
Gold medal – first place	2006 Turin	2.5km, sitski
Gold medal – first place	2006 Turin	5km, sitski
Silver medal – second place	2006 Turin	10km, sitski
Silver medal – second place	2010 Vancouver	1km sprint, sitski
Silver medal – second place	2010 Vancouver	3x2.5 km relay, open
Silver medal – second place	2014 Sochi	4x2.5 km relay, open
Bronze medal – third place	2002 Salt Lake City	10 km, sitting
Bronze medal – third place	2002 Salt Lake City	5 km, sitting
Bronze medal – third place	2002 Salt Lake City	2.5 km, sitting
Bronze medal – third place	2006 Turin	3x2.5 km relay, open
Bronze medal – third place	2010 Vancouver	10 km, sitting
World Championships
Women's para cross-country skiing
Gold medal – first place	2009 Vuokatti	1km sprint, sitski
Silver medal – second place	2003 Mitteltal-Obertal	2.5km, sitski
Silver medal – second place	2003 Mitteltal-Obertal	10km, sitski
Silver medal – second place	2005 Fort Kent	3x2.5 km relay, open
Silver medal – second place	2009 Vuokatti	10km, sitting
Silver medal – second place	2009 Vuokatti	2.5km, sitting
Silver medal – second place	2009 Vuokatti	3x2.5 km relay, open
Silver medal – second place	2011 Khanty-Mansiysk	3x2.5km relay, open
Silver medal – second place	2013 Sollefteå	10km, sitski
Women's para biathlon
Gold medal – first place	2009 Vuokatti	10 km, sitting
Gold medal – first place	2009 Vuokatti	3km pursuit, sitting
Gold medal – first place	2011 Khanty-Mansiysk	7.5km, sitting
Gold medal – first place	2013 Sollefteå	3km pursuit, sitting
Gold medal – first place	2013 Sollefteå	7.5km, sitting
Silver medal – second place	2011 Khanty-Mansiysk	3km pursuit, sitting
Silver medal – second place	2011 Khanty-Mansiysk	10km, sitting
Bronze medal – third place	2013 Sollefteå	10km, sitting

Olena Yuriyivna Iurkovska (Ukrainian: Олена Юріївна Юрковська, born 27 September 1983) is a cross-country skier and biathlete from Ukraine, and a five time Paralympic Champion. She has won a total of five gold, five silver, and five bronze medals up to 2010 in the Winter Paralympics. She also competed at the 2004 Summer Paralympics, as a member of the Ukrainian volleyball team.

Iurkovska was awarded the title Hero of Ukraine in April 2006. She won the Whang Youn Dai Achievement Award in 2006.
