= Iryna Bui =

Ukrainian Para biathlete and cross-country skier (born 1995)

Personal information
- Born: 29 April 1995 (age 31) Derazhnia, Khmelnytskyi Oblast, Ukraine
- Height: 1.58 m (5 ft 2 in)

Sport
- Country: Ukraine
- Sport: Para biathlon, Para cross-country skiing
- Disability class: LW8
Medal record
Representing Ukraine
Winter Paralympics
Women's Para biathlon
Gold medal – first place	2022 Beijing	10 km standing
Silver medal – second place	2026 Milano Cortina	Sprint pursuit standing
Women's Para cross-country skiing
Bronze medal – third place	2022 Beijing	10 km free standing
World Para Snow Sports Championships
Gold medal – first place	2021 Lillehammer	12.5 km
Silver medal – second place	2021 Lillehammer	10 km

Iryna Bui (Ukrainian: Ірина Буй, also transliterated Buy, born 29 April 1995) is a Ukrainian Para biathlete and cross-country skier. She won the gold medal in the women's 10 kilometres standing event at the 2022 Winter Paralympics held in Beijing, China. She also competed at the Winter Paralympics in 2014 and 2018.

== Early life ==
Bui was born in Derazhnia, Khmelnytskyi Oblast. She was born with congenital malformation of the left hand.

== Career ==
At the age of 15, Bui started playing sports. She made her debut on the international arena in December 2011, taking part in international competitions in cross-country skiing and biathlon. In 2012, Bui was included in the Paralympic team of Ukraine.

At the 2012 World Cup in Vuokatti, Finland in the 12.5 km biathlon event, Bui won a bronze medal. At the 2013 World Championships in Sollefteå, Sweden, she also won gold and silver in 10 km and 12.5 km events respectively. Bui became the winner of the finals of the World Cup in 2013.

At the 2021 World Para Snow Sports Championships in biathlon, Bui won the silver medal in the women's 10 km standing biathlon event. She also won the gold medal in the women's 12.5 km standing biathlon event.

She won the gold medal in the women's 10 kilometres standing event at the 2022 Winter Paralympics held in Beijing, China. The silver and bronze medals were also won by Ukrainian competitors.
