= Lada Nesterenko =

Ukrainian cross-country skier (born 1976)

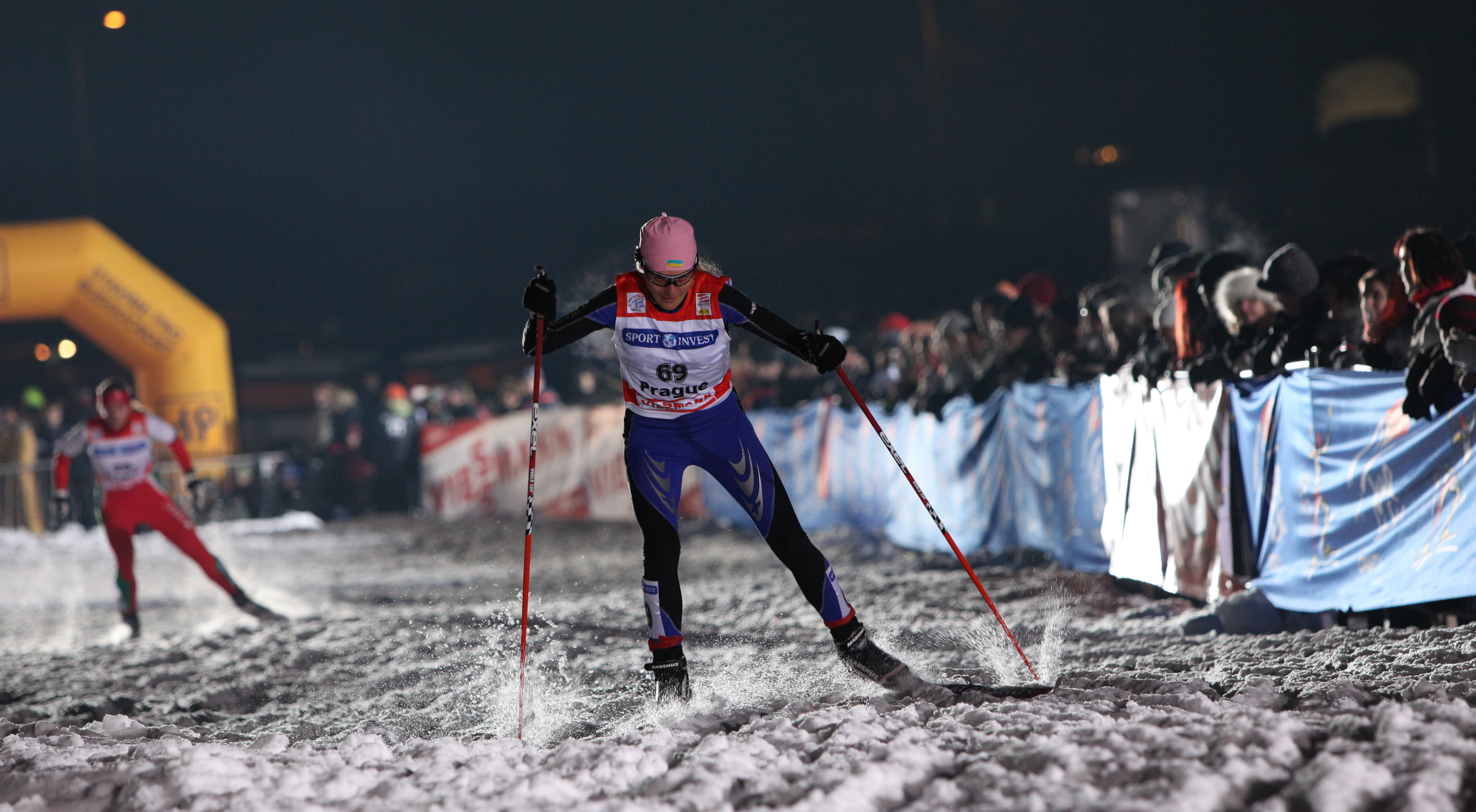
- Nesterenko in 2010

Personal information
- Nationality: Ukraine
- Born: 3 August 1976 (age 49) Kyiv, Ukrainian SSR, Soviet Union

Sport
- Sport: Skiing

World Cup career
- Seasons: 7 – (1999–2000, 2005, 2008–2011)
- Indiv. starts: 63
- Indiv. podiums: 0
- Team starts: 4
- Team podiums: 0
- Overall titles: 0 – (87th in 2011)
- Discipline titles: 0

Lada Stanislavivna Nesterenko (Ukrainian: Лада Станіславівна Нестеренко; born August 3, 1976) is a Ukrainian cross-country skier who competed between 1995 and 2017. At the 2010 Winter Olympics, she finished 44th in the 30 km and 57th in the 10 km events.

Nesterenko's best finish at the FIS Nordic World Ski Championships was seventh in the 30 km event at Sapporo in 2007.

Her best World Cup finish was 11th in the 4 × 5 km relay event at France in 2008 while his best individual finish was 25th in the 10 km event at Estonia in 2009.

== Cross-country skiing results ==
All results are sourced from the International Ski Federation (FIS).

=== Olympic Games ===
Year	Age	10 km individual	15 km skiathlon	30 km mass start	Sprint	4 × 5 km relay	Team sprint
2010	33	56	—	43	—	—	—

=== World Championships ===
Year	Age	5 km	10 km	15 km	Pursuit	30 km	Sprint	4 × 5 km relay	Team sprint
1999	22	—	—N/a	39	—	36	—N/a	—	—N/a
2001	24	—N/a	53	—	—	CNX^{[a]}	48	—	—N/a
2005	28	—N/a	45	—N/a	45	43	—	DSQ	—
2007	30	—N/a	17	—N/a	25	7	57	12	—
2009	32	—N/a	33	—N/a	40	—	71	11	—
2011	34	—N/a	36	—N/a	37	24	—	12	—
2017	40	—N/a	60	—N/a	—	39	—	16	—

a. ^{1} Cancelled due to extremely cold weather.

=== World Cup ===
==== Season standings ====
Season	Age	Discipline standings					Ski Tour standings		
Season	Age	Overall	Distance	Long Distance	Middle Distance	Sprint	Nordic Opening	Tour de Ski	World Cup Final
1999	22	NC	—N/a	NC	—N/a	—	—N/a	—N/a	—N/a
2000	23	NC	—N/a	—	NC	—	—N/a	—N/a	—N/a
2005	28	NC	NC	—N/a	—N/a	—	—N/a	—N/a	—N/a
2008	31	88	57	—N/a	—N/a	NC	—N/a	33	45
2009	32	111	80	—N/a	—N/a	NC	—N/a	35	—
2010	33	97	73	—N/a	—N/a	NC	—N/a	36	—
2011	34	87	61	—N/a	—N/a	NC	52	31	—
