= Aibga Ridge =

Mountain in Russia

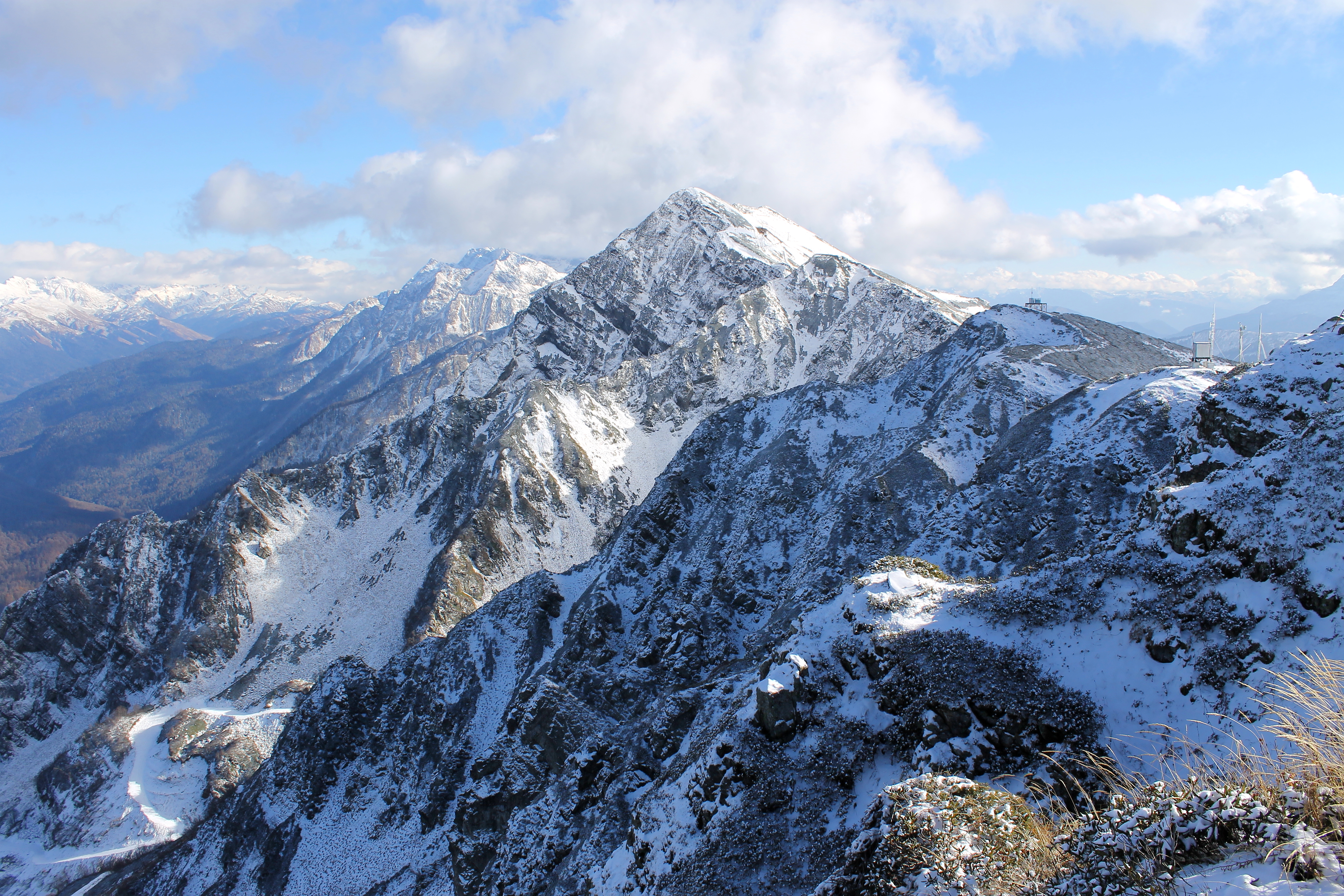
- The Aibga Ridge.

Dimensions
- Length: 85 km (53 mi)

Geography
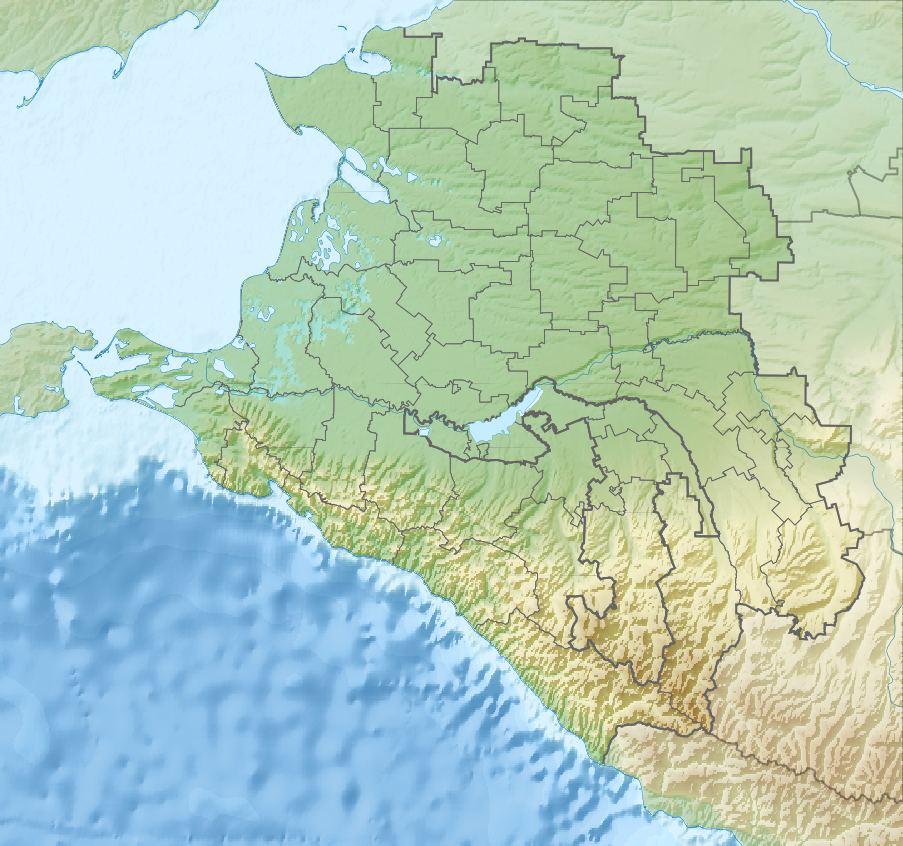
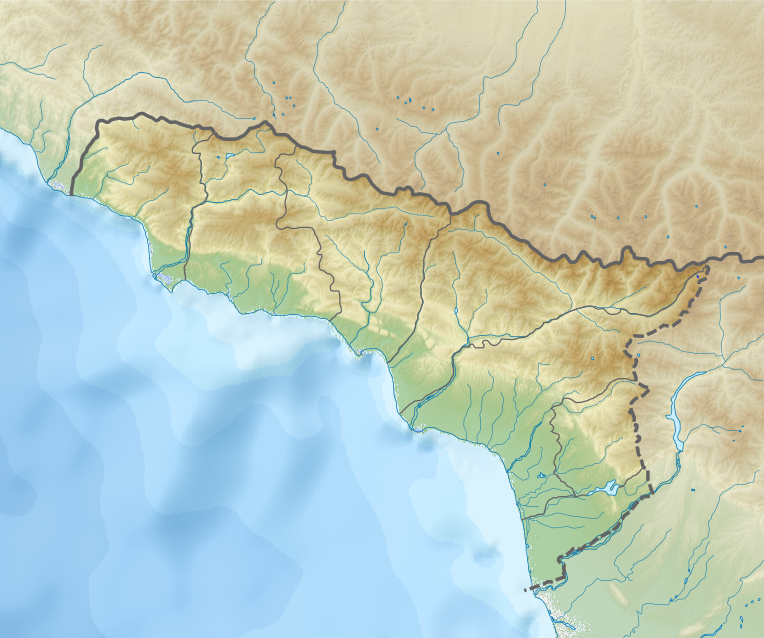
- Location within Krasnodar Krai Location within Russia Location within Abkhazia
- Country: Russia
- Range coordinates: 43°37′40″N 40°17′13″E
- Parent range: Western Caucasus, Caucasus Mountains

The Aibga Ridge is a mountain ridge in the Roza Khutor plateau of the Western Caucasus, near Krasnaya Polyana, Sochi, Krasnodar Krai, Russia. It contains the Rosa Khutor Alpine Resort which stands at the ridge, built in 2011 to accommodate the 2014 Winter Olympics.
