= Psekhako Ridge =

Coordinates: 43°41′N 40°20′E

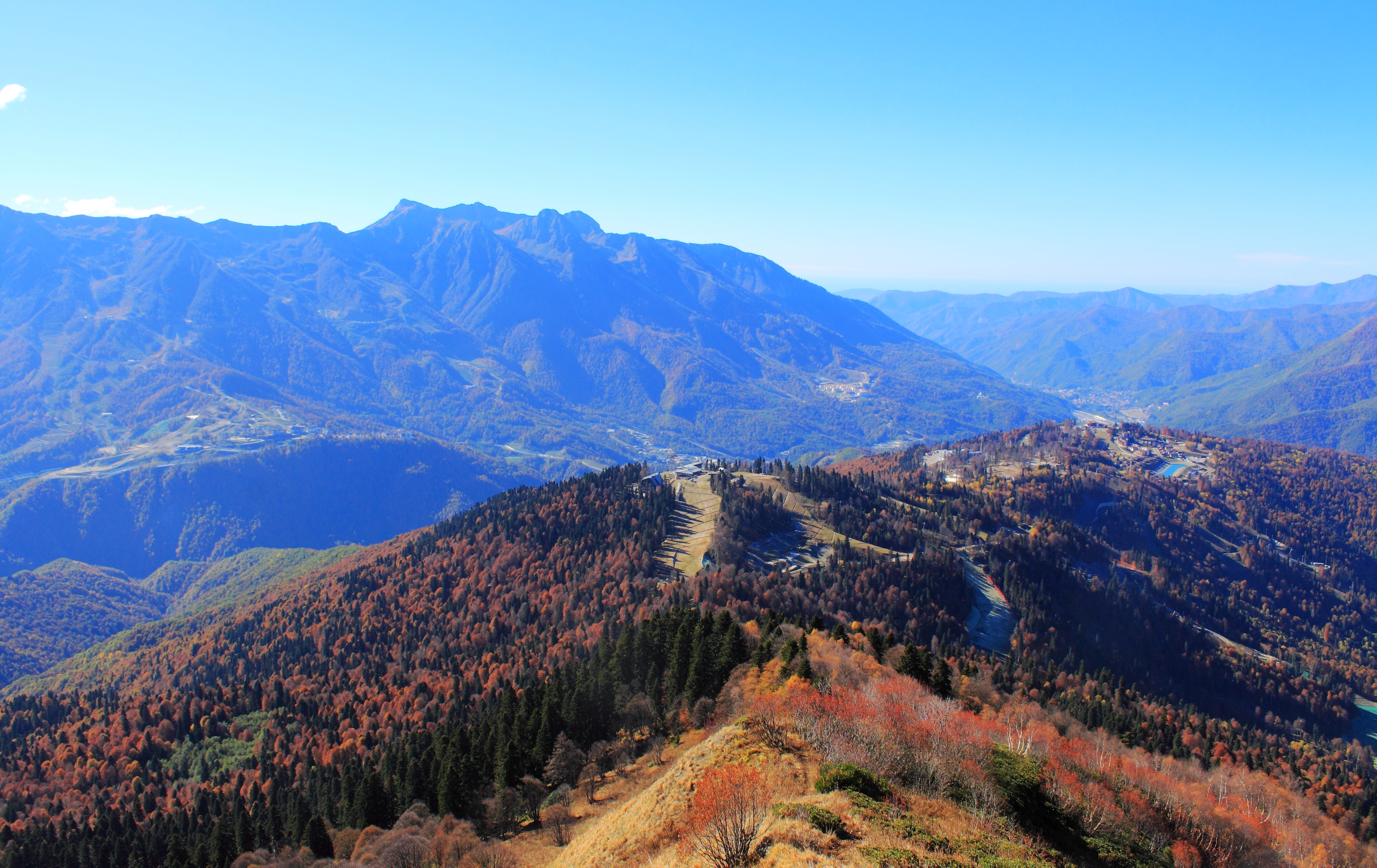
View to Psekhako ridge and the tourist center of Gazprom from the ridge Bzerpi

Psekhako Ridge (Russian: Хребет Псехако) is a mountain range in the vicinity of the village of Krasnaya Polyana, in the Adlersky City District of Sochi, Krasnodar Krai, Russia. From the northwest and west it is bordered by the River Laura Basin, from the south-west by the Achipse river, which flows into Laura, and from the south by the River Mzimta Basin, which flows to the Black Sea.

Rising gradually from the southwest to the northeast ridge adjacent to its upper part to the ridge Bzerpi, north of which is the massif Pseashkho. In the northern part of the ridge begins the territory of the Caucasian Biosphere Reserve.

Absolute marks ridge reach heights of 1400–1600 m ridge covered with deciduous and coniferous forests Caucasian. In the 1960s, logging was carried out on the ridge.

== 2014 Winter Olympics ==
At the foot of the mountain ridge located Psekhako tourist center of Gazprom and a large part of the ridge together with the grounds on which it is leased to Gazprom to build ski resort facilities and facilities of the Sochi Winter Olympics in 2014. Shelter number 1 or its official name "House for Receptions of Official Delegations" will be part of the official events of the Winter Olympics.
