= Rosa Khutor Alpine Resort =

Ski resort in Krasnodar Krai, Russia

Rosa Khutor
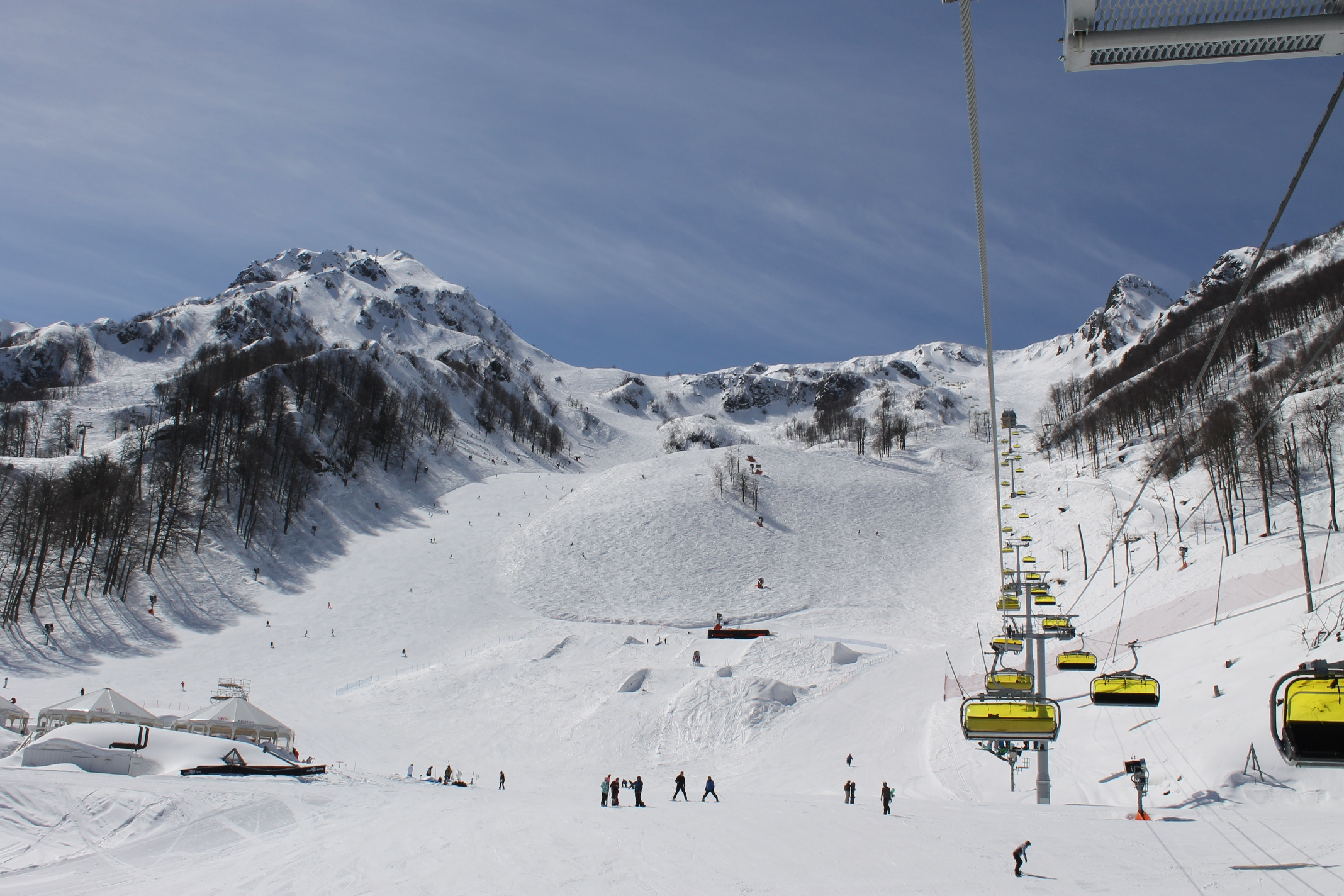
- Ski runs at 1600 m above sea level, April 2014
- Interactive map of Rosa Khutor
- Location: Western Caucasus, Russia
- Nearest city: Sochi - 50 km (30 mi); Krasnaya Polyana - 10 km (6 mi)
- Coordinates: 43.646°N 40.332°E
- Vertical: 1,380 m (4,528 ft)
- Top elevation: 2,320 m (7,612 ft) AMSL
- Base elevation: 940 m (3,084 ft) - Stadium
- Trails: 63 —39%: Easiest —34%: More Difficult —27%: Expert
- Lift system: 18 lifts 5 gondolas (8 person); 9 chairlifts, 2 T-bars; 2 magic carpets
- Lift capacity: 30702 pph
- Terrain parks: 1
- Website: Rosa Khutor

Location of the resort in Russia

The Rosa Khutor Alpine Resort (Russian: Ро́за Ху́тор, romanized: Roza Khutor, IPA: [ˈrozə ˈxutər]) is an alpine ski resort in Krasnodar Krai, Russia, located at the Aibga Ridge of the Western Caucasus along the Roza Khutor plateau near Krasnaya Polyana. Constructed from 2003 to 2011, it hosted the alpine skiing events for the 2014 Winter Olympics and Paralympics, based in nearby Sochi. The resort is 50 kilometers (30 mi) east of the Black Sea at Sochi; the majority of the slopes at Rosa Khutor face northeast, with the backside slopes facing southwest.

== Elevations ==
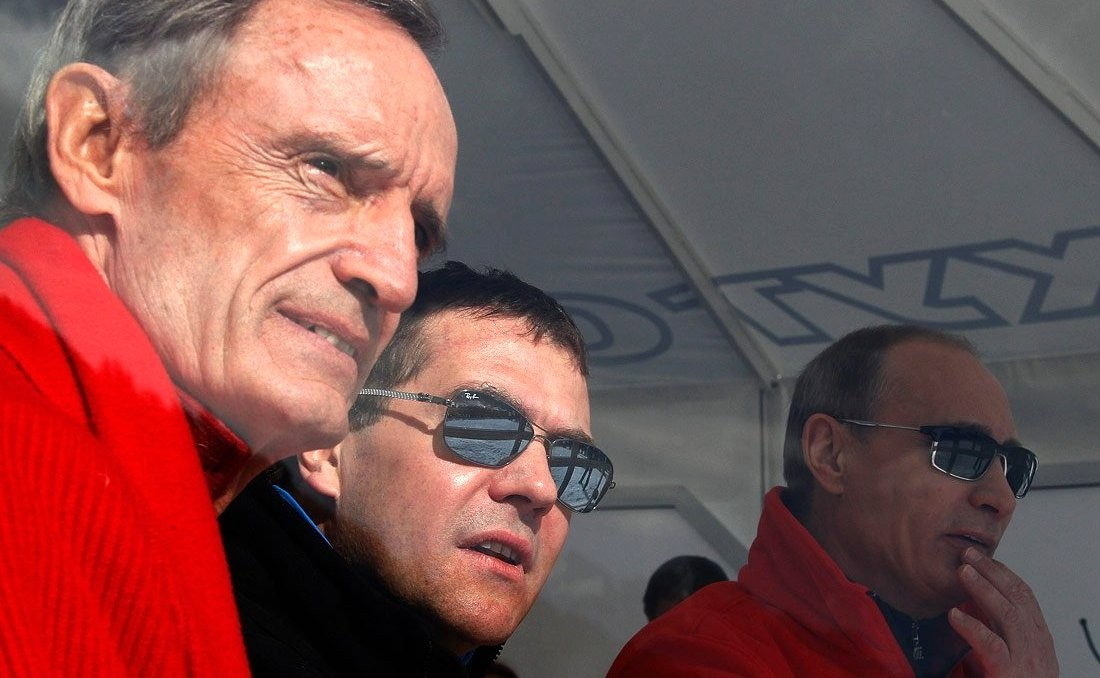
Jean-Claude Killy, Dmitry Medvedev, and Vladimir Putin at the European Cup events at Rosa Khutor in February 2011

The lower base area of Roza Valley at the Mzymta River is at an elevation of 560 meters (1,840 ft) above sea level. The highest lift is the Caucasus Express gondola, which climbs to the summit of Roza Peak at 2,320 m (7,610 ft), yielding a total vertical drop of over a mile at 1,760 m (5,770 ft). The main base area for skiing is at Roza Plateau at 1,170 m (3,840 ft), a vertical drop of 1,150 m (3,770 ft) from the summit. Besedka, the mid-mountain area, is at 1,350 m (4,430 ft) and is the lower loading station of the Caucasus Express; which has a mid-lift loading station at Roza-1600, about a mile above sea level at 1,600 m (5,200 ft). At the eastern edge of the resort is Rosa Stadium, the finish area for the alpine racing events at 940 m (3,080 ft), a vertical drop of 1,380 m (4,530 ft) from the Roza Peak summit.

== Hotels ==
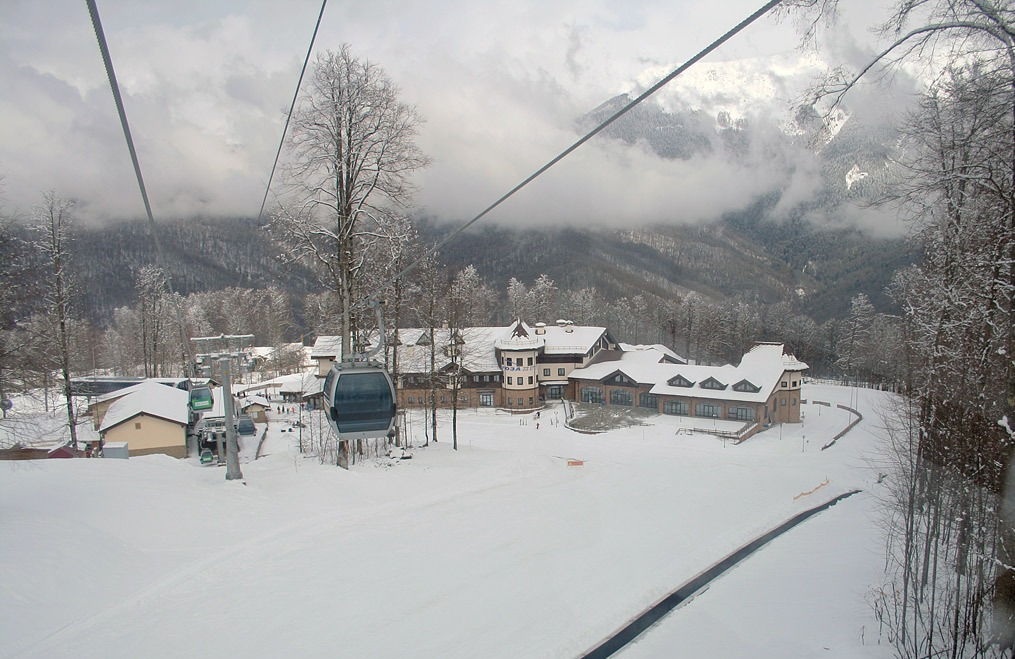
Gondola base area in 2011

As of May 2026, the Rosa Khutor resort website contains information about 26 hotels.

== World Cup 2012 ==
Rosa Khutor hosted World Cup alpine races in the downhill and super combined for both men and women in February 2012, two years ahead of the Olympics. The race courses were designed by 1972 Olympic gold medalist Bernhard Russi.

The men's World Cup downhill started well below the summit at 2,045 meters (6,709 ft) and finished at 970 meters (3,180 ft), with a vertical drop of 1,075 meters (3,527 ft) and a course length of 3.495 kilometers (2.172 mi). The maximum gradient is 84% (40 degrees) at the top of the course. The 2012 downhill was won by Beat Feuz of Switzerland.

The first alpine test events were held in February 2011 on the European Cup circuit.

== Gallery ==
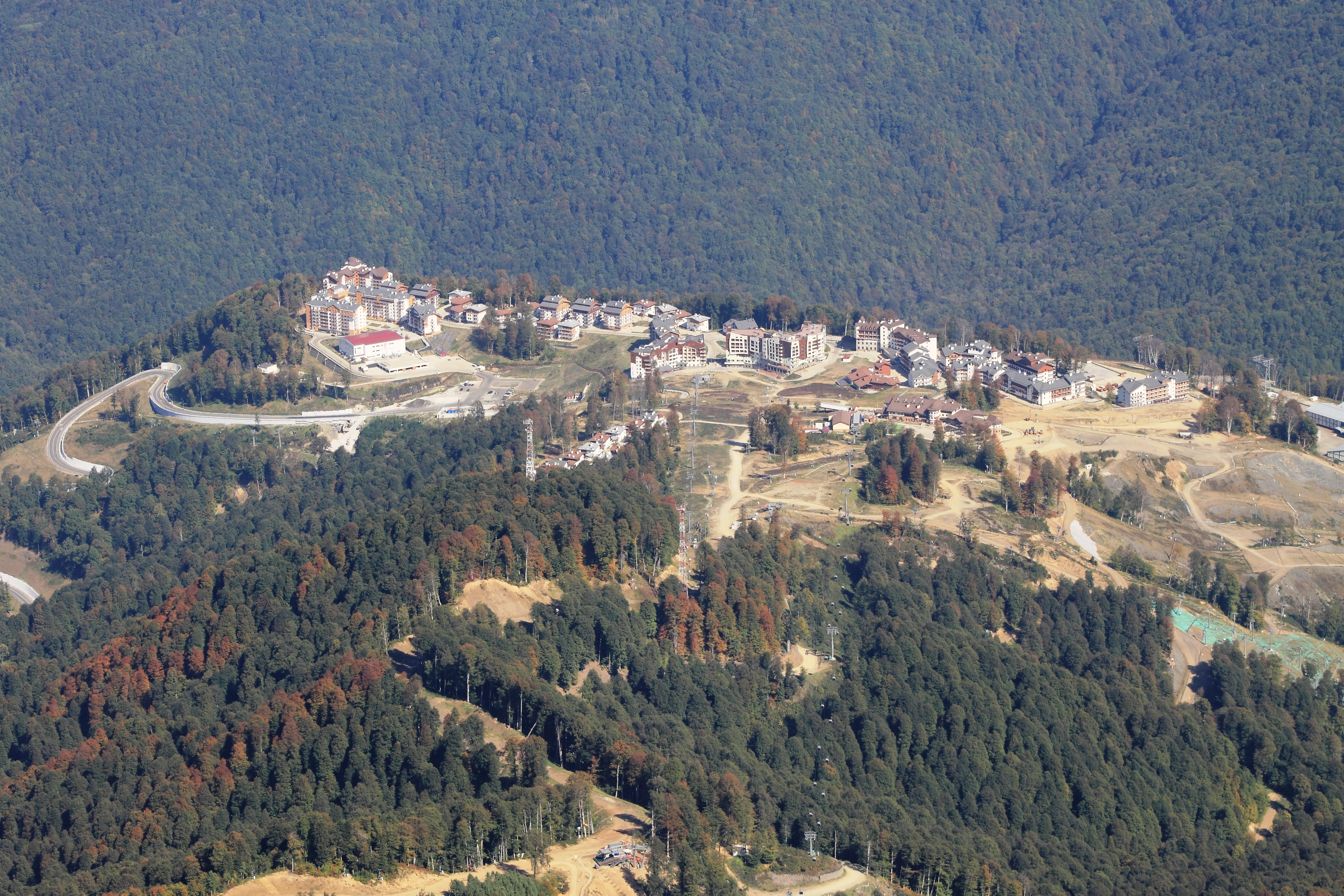
General view of the elevation of 1170 m (Rose Plateau) from the Aibga Ridge.

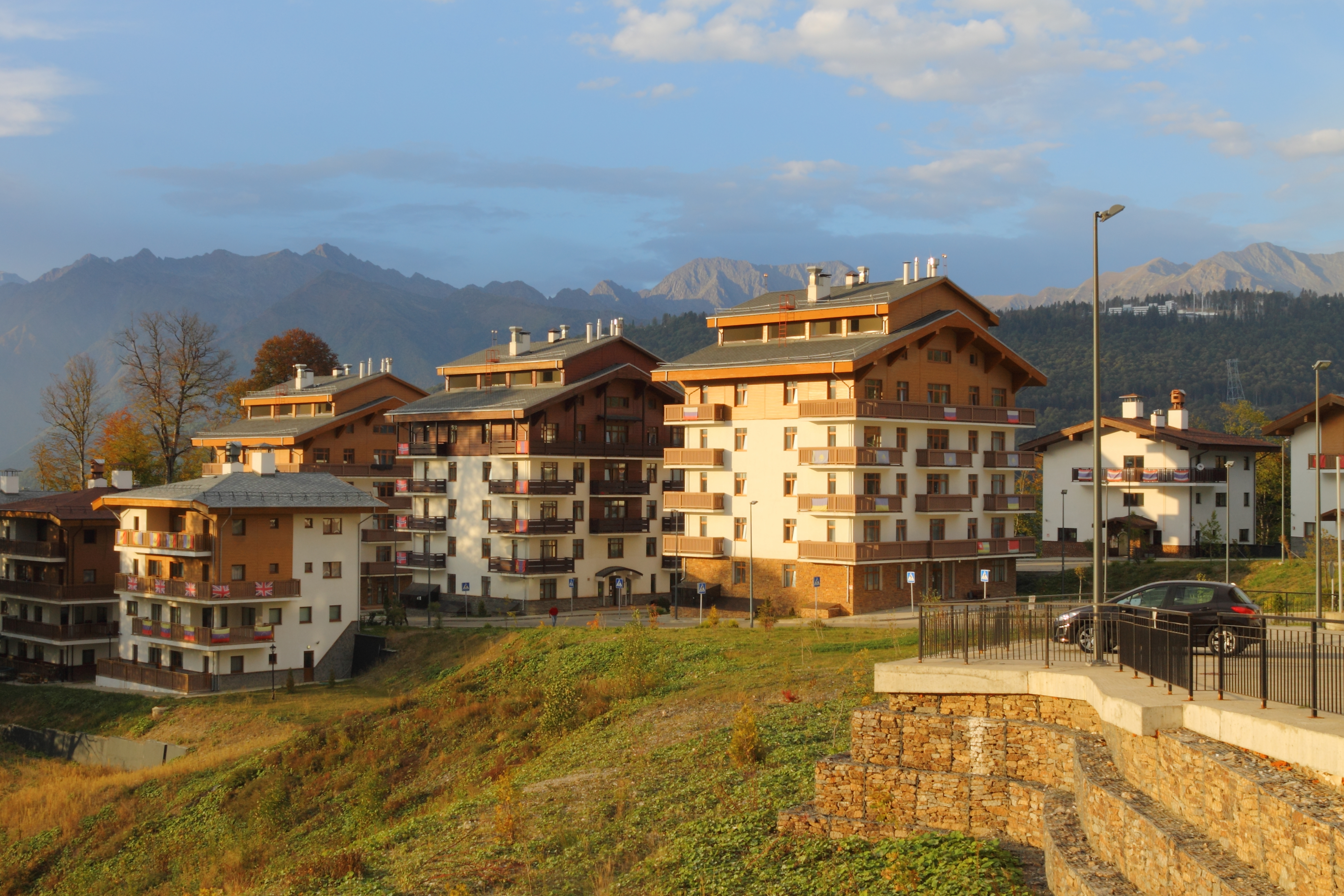
Mountain Olympic Village. 1170 m above sea level.

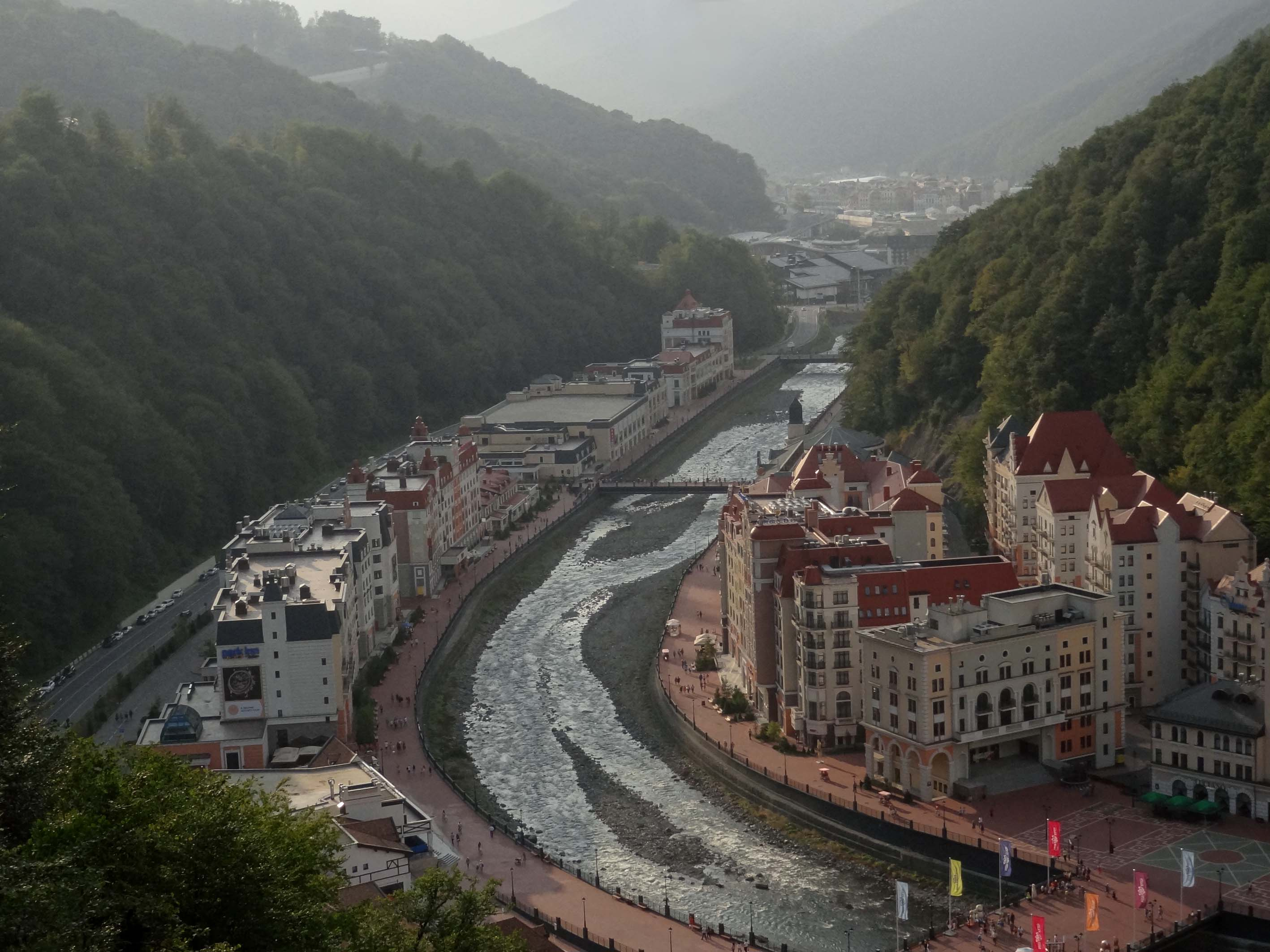
Hotels and other facilities of the complex on the banks of the river Mzymta.

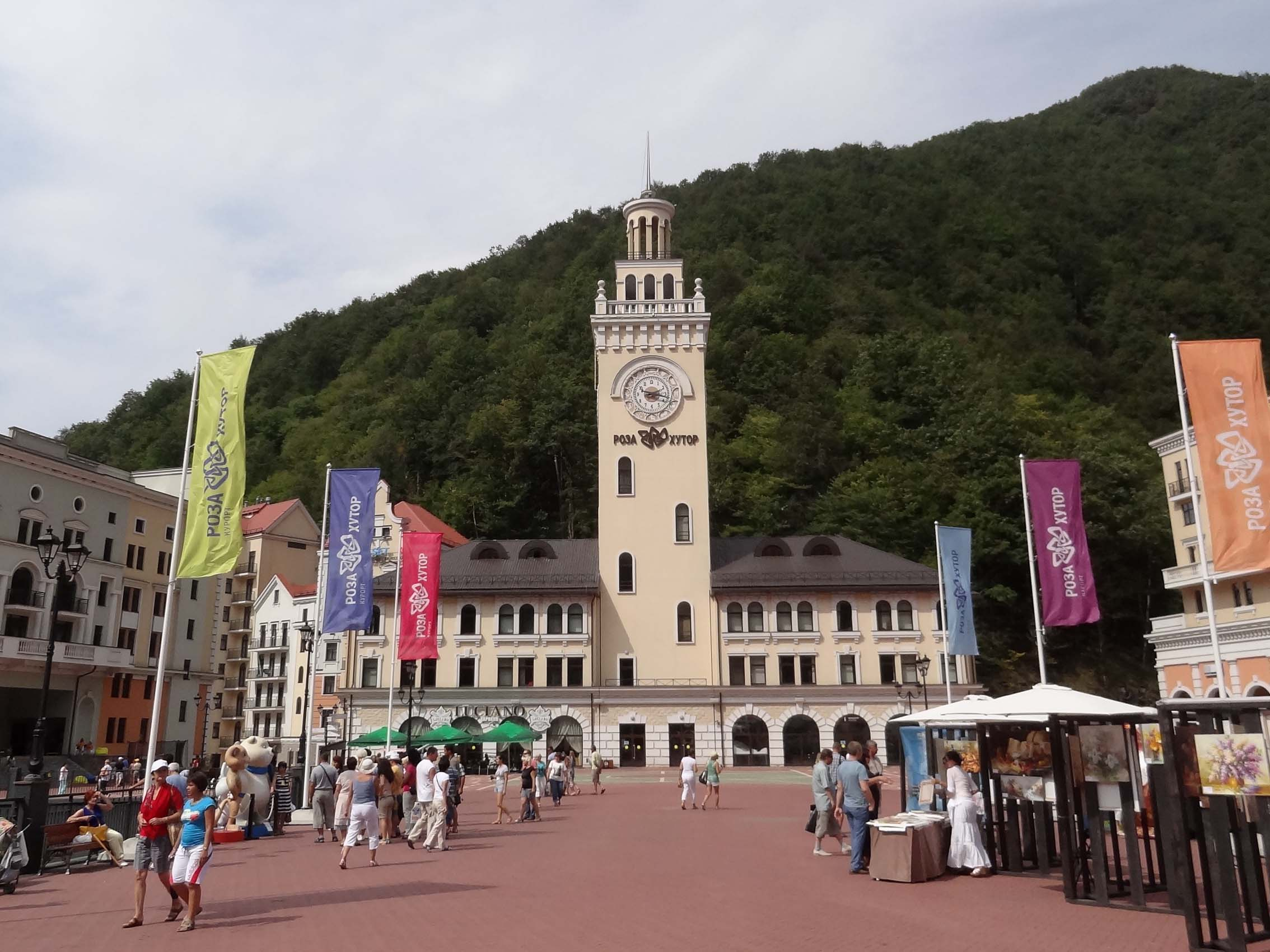
The tower of the "Town Hall" building, stylized as a tower of the Sochi railway station.

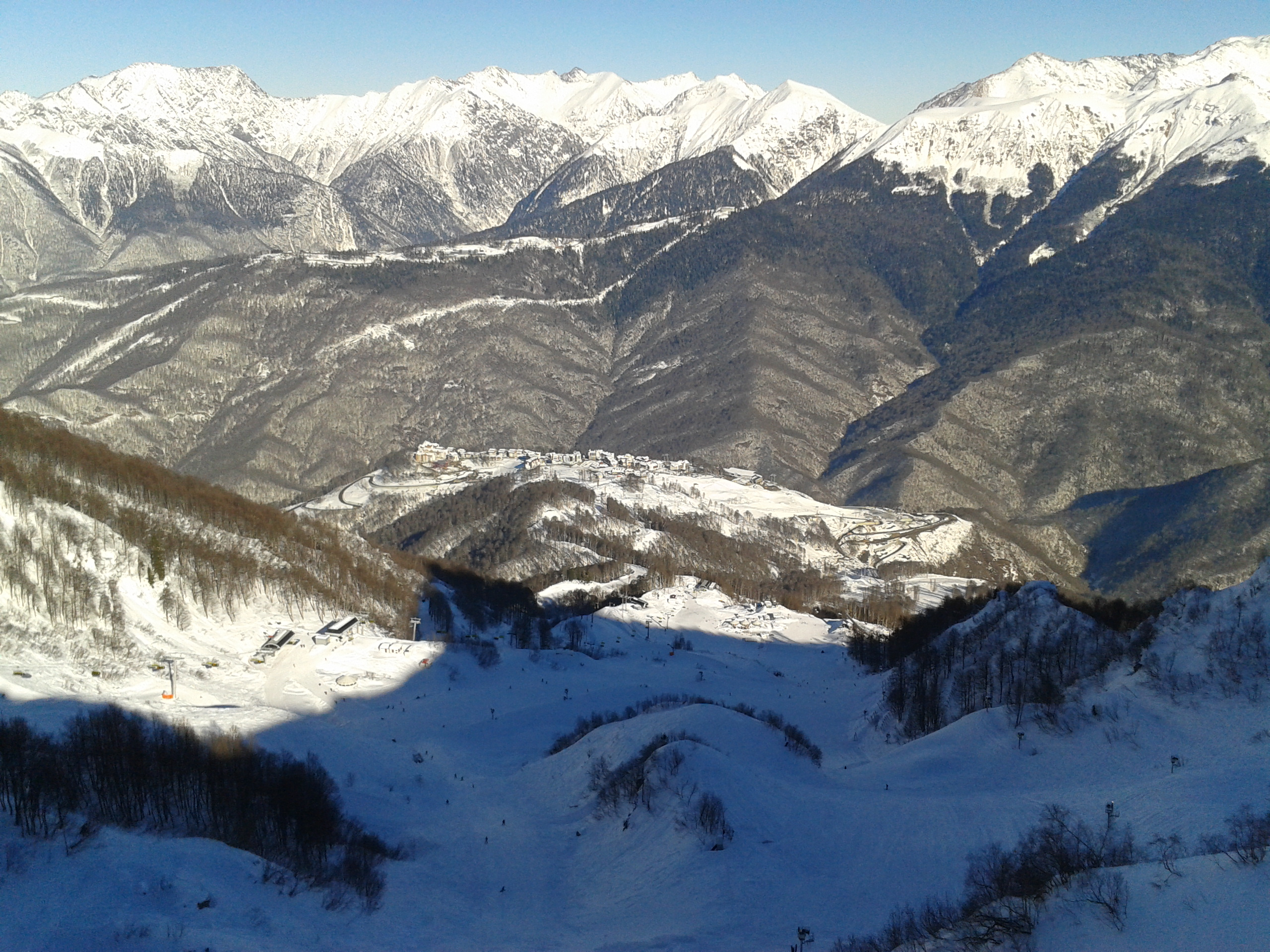
View of the site in 2013.

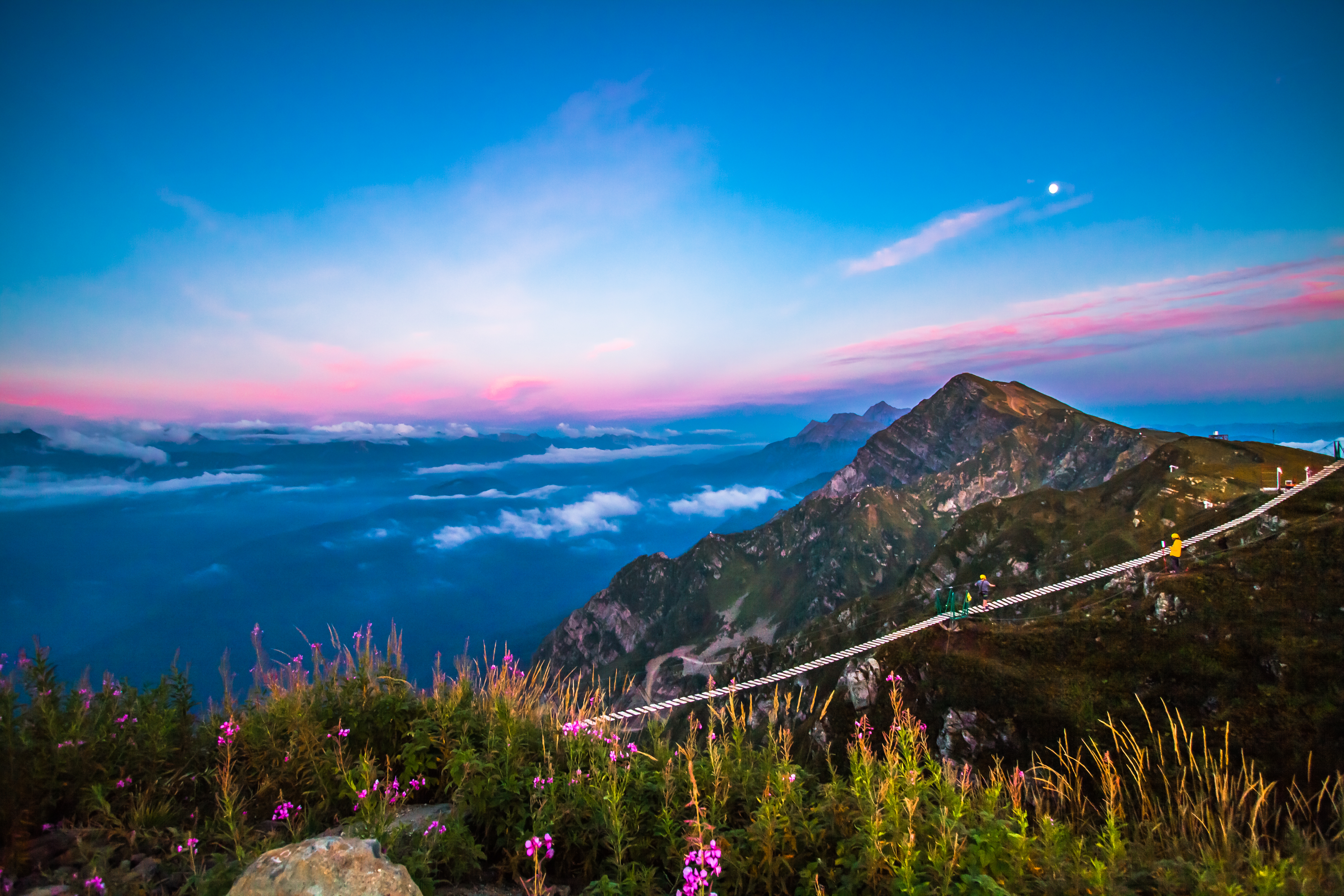
In the ski resort Rosa Khutor.

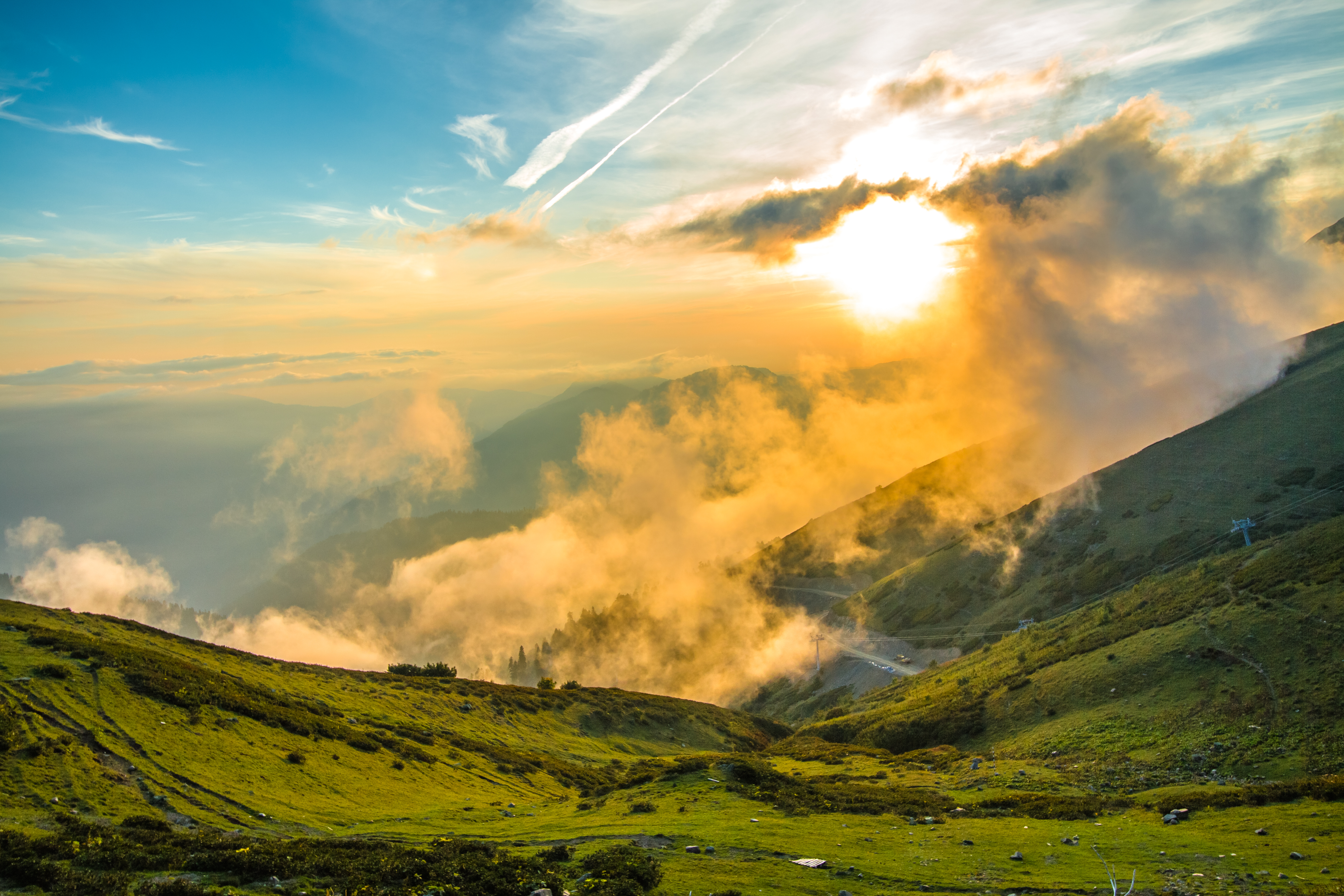
Sochi, Krasnodar Krai

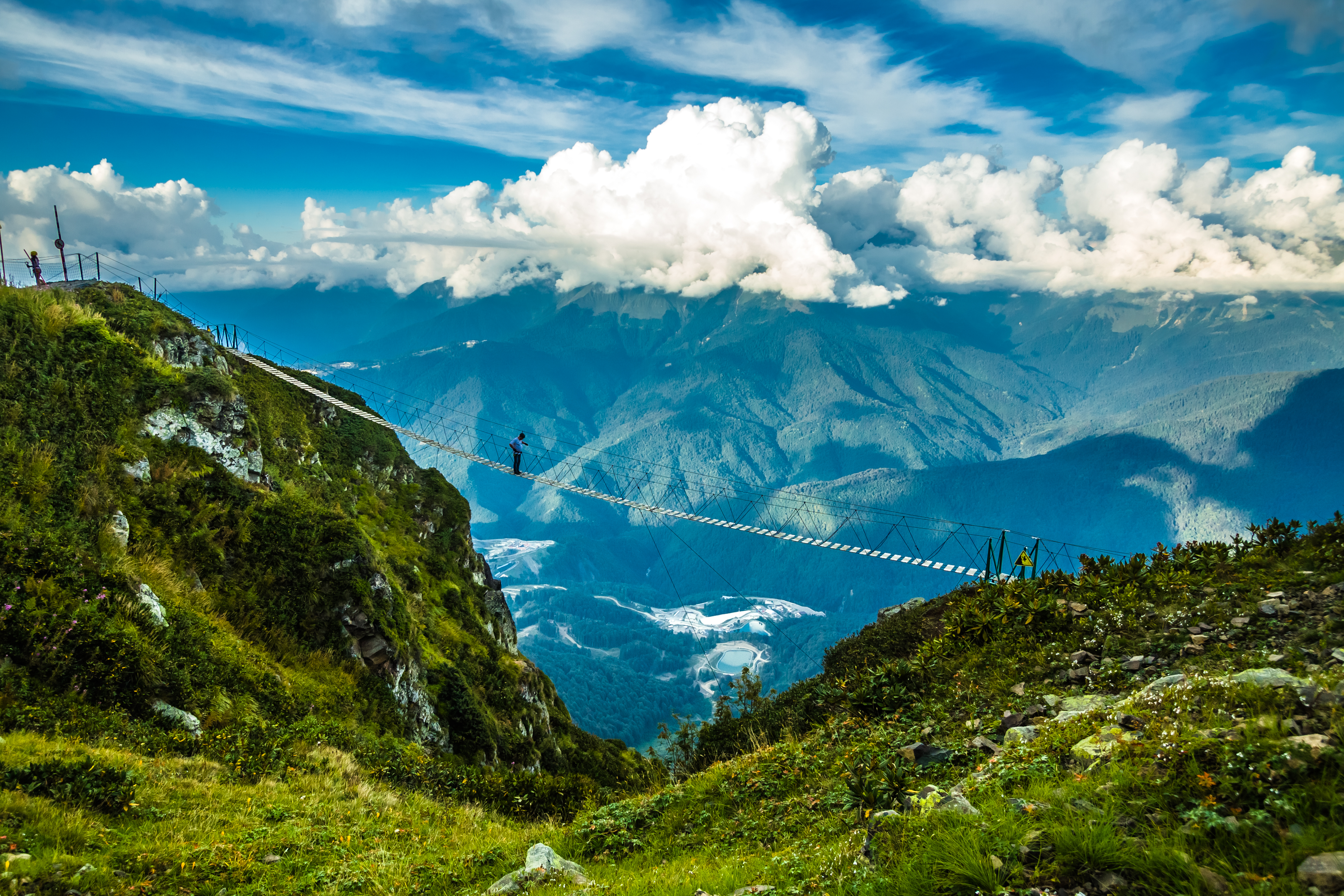
Cotton clouds

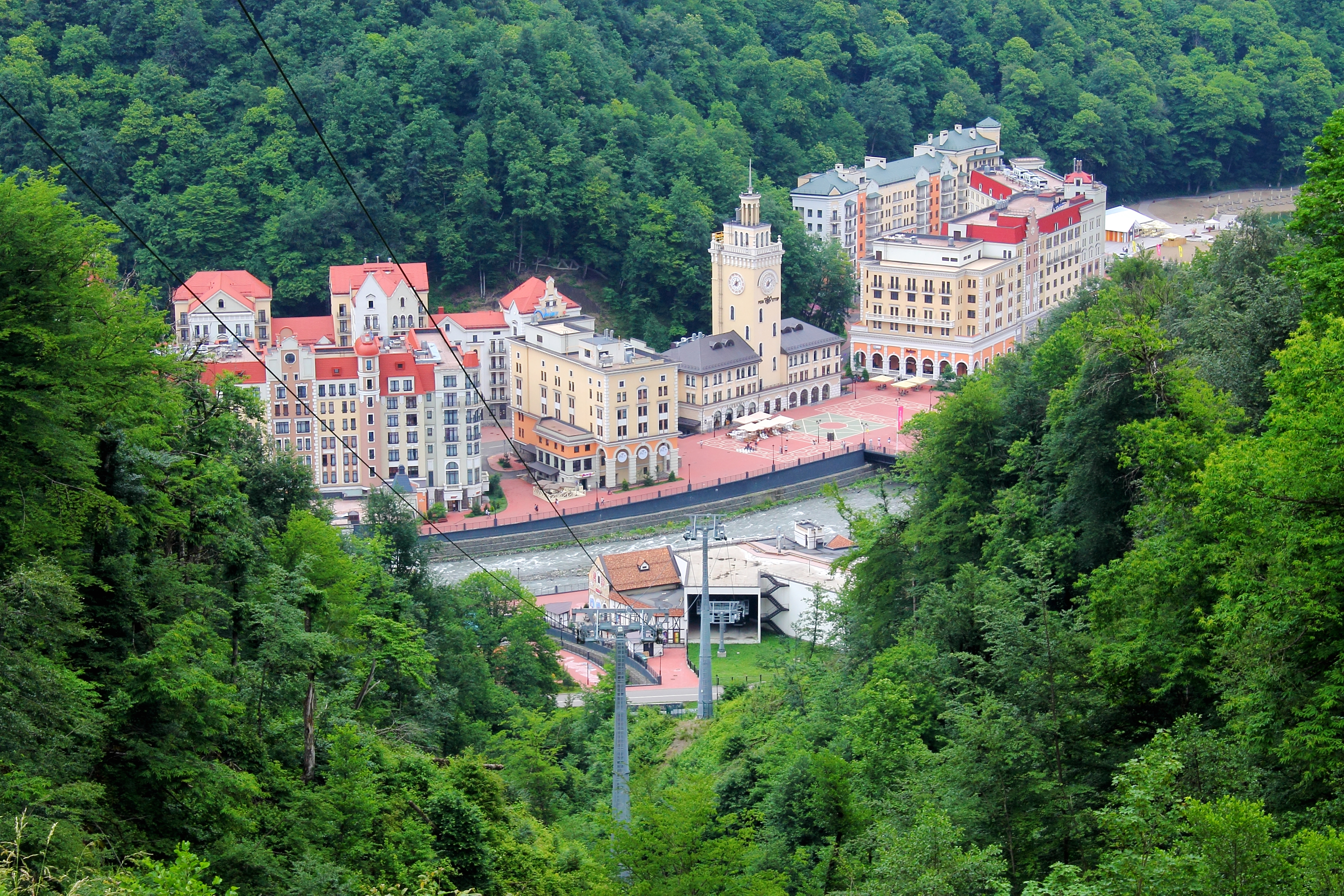
Mountain Resort Rosa Khutor, Krasnaya Polyana, Sochi.

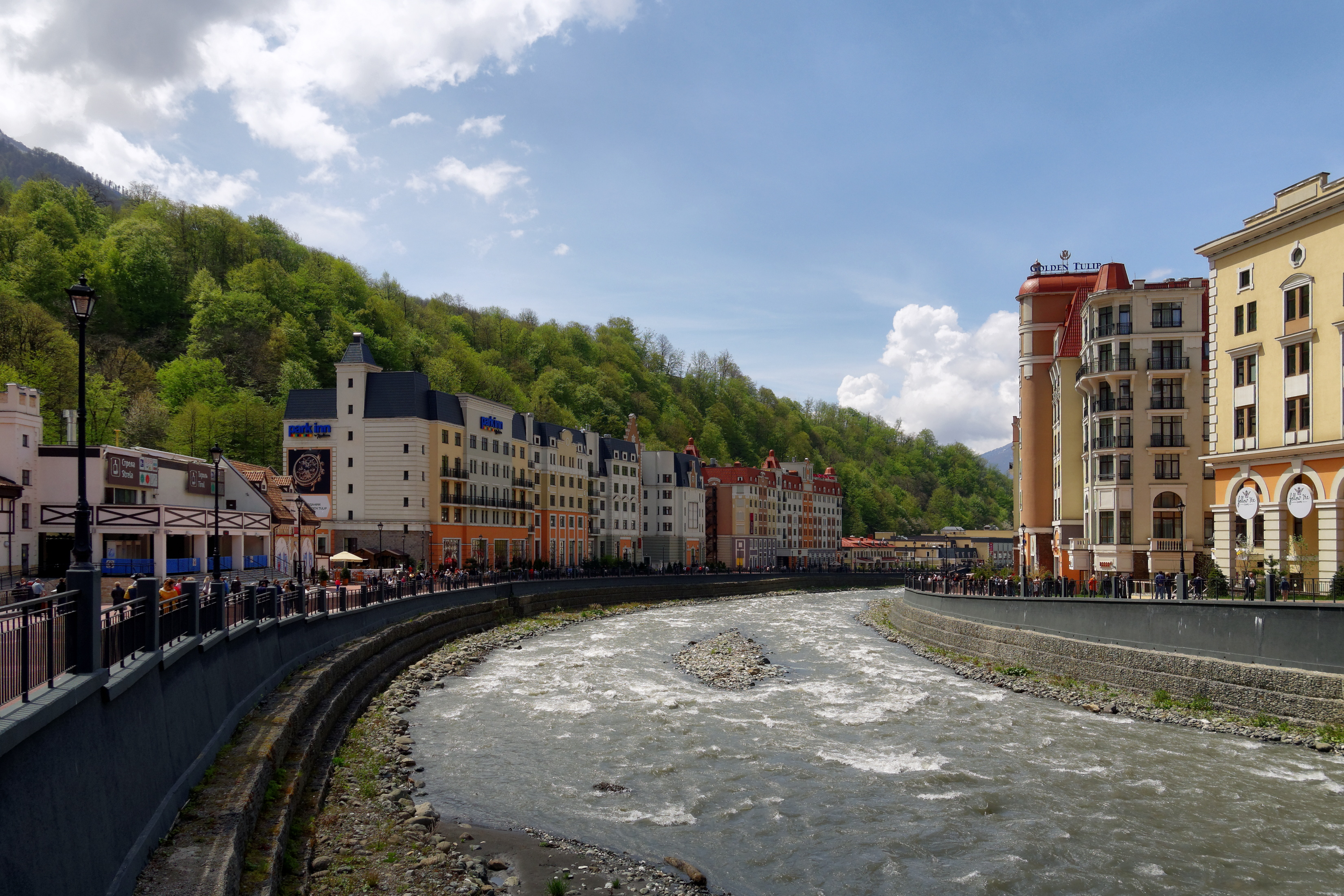
Krasnaya Polyana. Mzymta River

== See also ==
- Rosa Khutor Extreme Park
- Khutor
