= Krasnaya Polyana, Sochi, Krasnodar Krai =

Krasnaya Polyana Красная Поляна
- Urban-type settlement
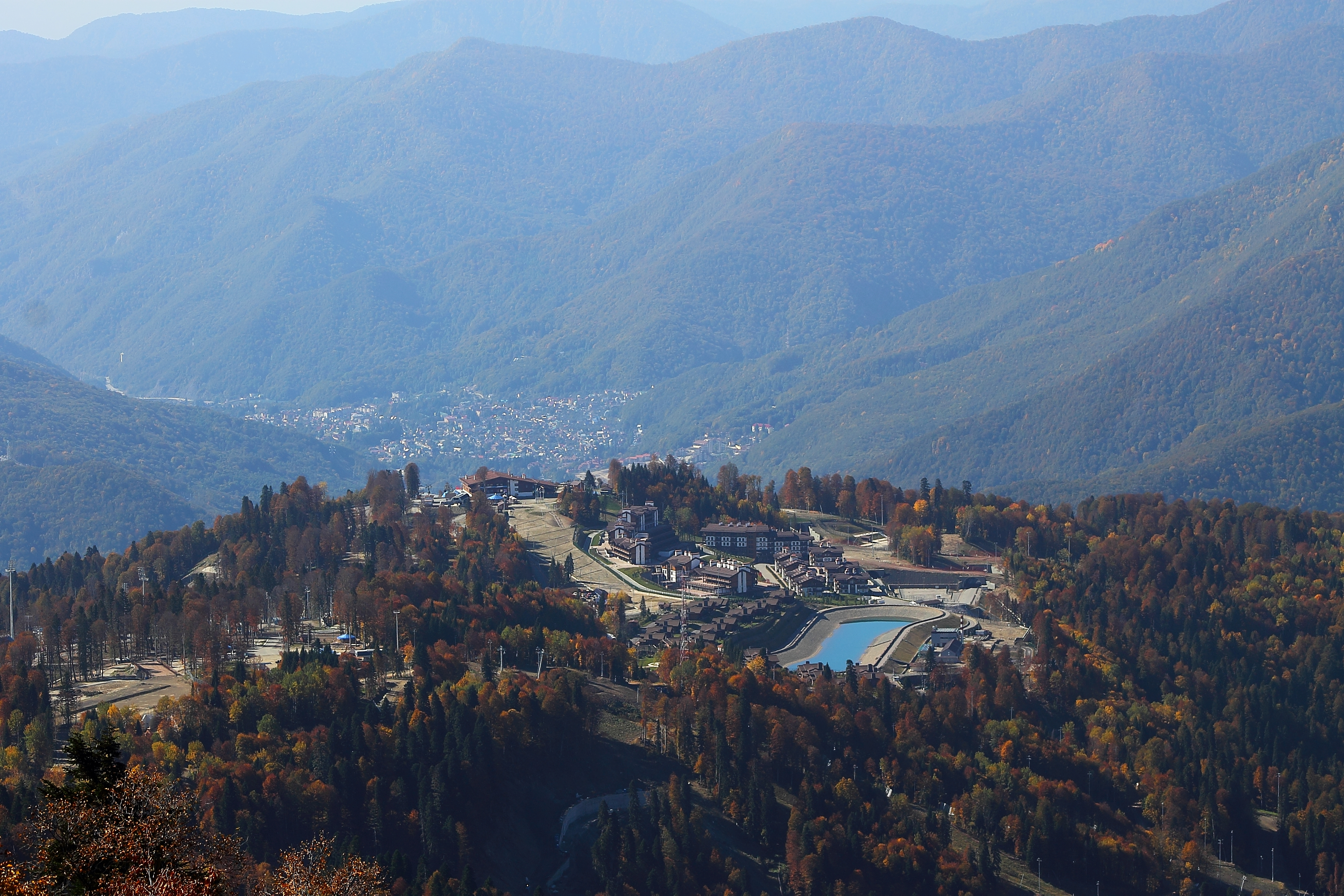
- General view of the Krasnaya Polyana from the Psekhako Ridge. In the foreground is a mountain Olympic village.
- Interactive map of Krasnaya Polyana
- Location of Krasnaya Polyana Krasnaya Polyana (European Russia) Krasnaya Polyana (Russia) Krasnaya Polyana (Europe)
- Coordinates: 43°40′43″N 40°12′19″E
- Country: Russia
- Federal subject: Krasnodar Krai
- Settlement okrugSelsoviet: Krasnopolyansky Settlement Okrug
- Founded: 1869
- Urban-type settlement status since: 1950
- Elevation: 533 m (1,749 ft)

Population (2010 Census)
  - Total: 4,598
  - Estimate (2013): 4,666 (+1.5%)

Administrative status
  - Subordinated to: City of Sochi
  - Capital of: Krasnopolyansky Settlement Okrug

Municipal status
  - Urban okrug: Sochi Urban Okrug
- Time zone: UTC+3 (MSK)
- Postal code: 354392
- Dialing code: +7 8622
- OKTMO ID: 03726000056

Krasnaya Polyana (Russian: Кра́сная Поля́на, IPA: [ˈkrasnəjə pɐˈlʲanə]; Abkhaz: Гәбаадәы, Gwbaadwy; Adyghe: Ӏаткъуадж, ‘atquaj, Greek: Κράσναγια Πολιάνα) is an urban locality (an urban-type settlement) in Krasnopolyansky Settlement Okrug, which is under the administrative jurisdiction of Adlersky City District of the City of Sochi in Krasnodar Krai, Russia. Population: 4,598 (2010 census); 3,969 (2002 census); 3,300 (1989 Soviet census).

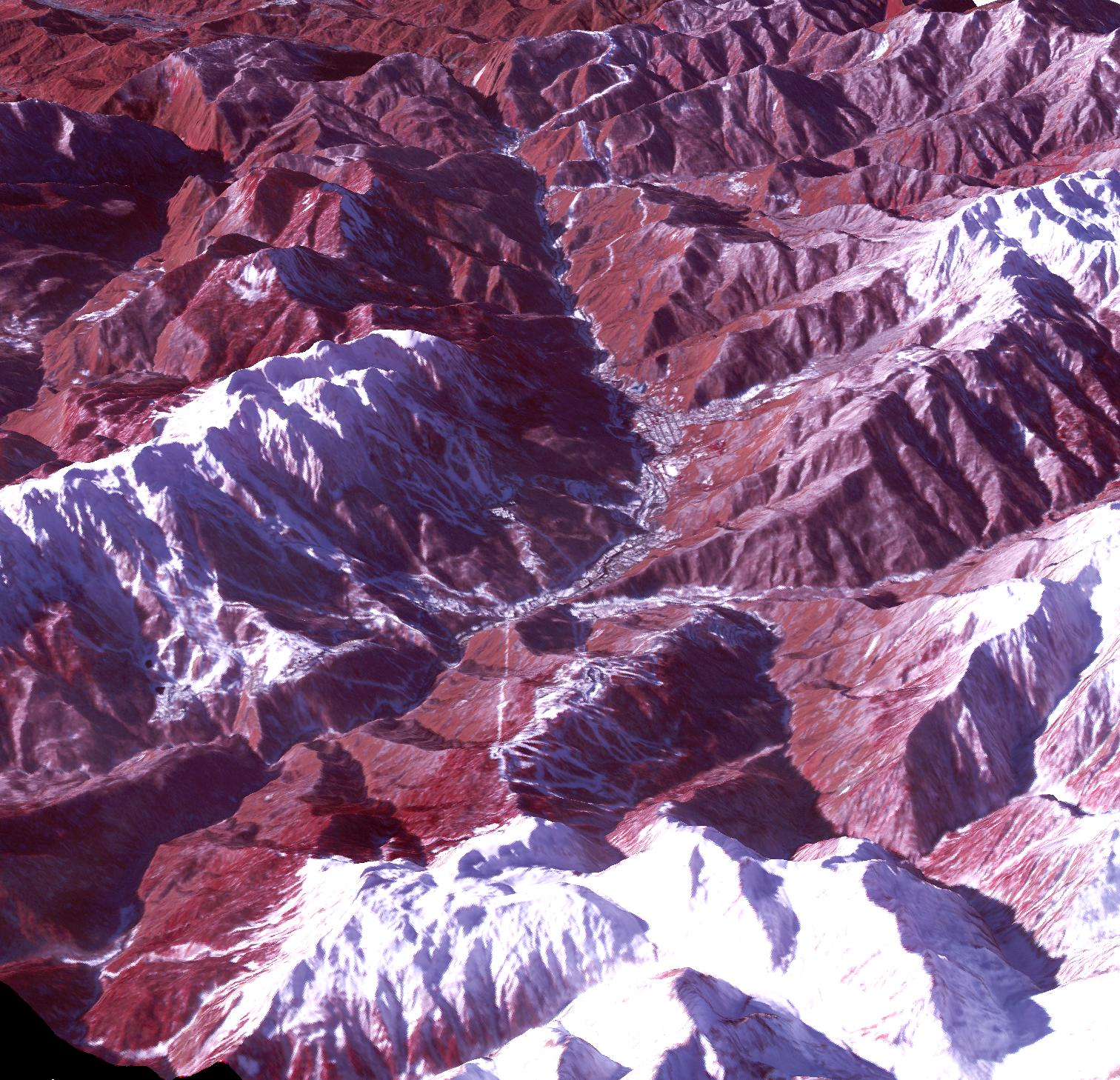
Rosa Khutor ski resort near Sochi, is in the valley at center, and the runs are visible on the shadowed slopes on the left-hand side of the valley

Located in the Western Caucasus, it is home to the new Rosa Khutor alpine ski resort, with a base elevation of 560 meters (1,840 ft) along the Mzymta River, 39 kilometers (24 mi) from its influx into the Black Sea in Adlersky City District of Sochi. The lift-served summit climbs to 2,320 meters (7,610 ft), giving a vertical drop of over a mile at 1,760 meters (5,770 ft). The resort hosted the Alpine and Nordic events of the 2014 Winter Olympics in Sochi, having previously hosted World Cup alpine events from February 2012, two years earlier.

== Geography ==
Krasnaya Polyana is set against the scenic backdrop of the Caucasus Mountains, which exceed 2,000 meters (6,600 ft) in elevation, at a distance of 67 kilometers (42 mi) from the center of Sochi by road and 40 kilometers (25 mi) from the Adler-Sochi International Airport. The settlement has been plagued by transport problems: in order to improve this for the 2014 Winter Olympics, a railway line was built, connecting the area with the airport, Sochi Olympic Village, and central Sochi.

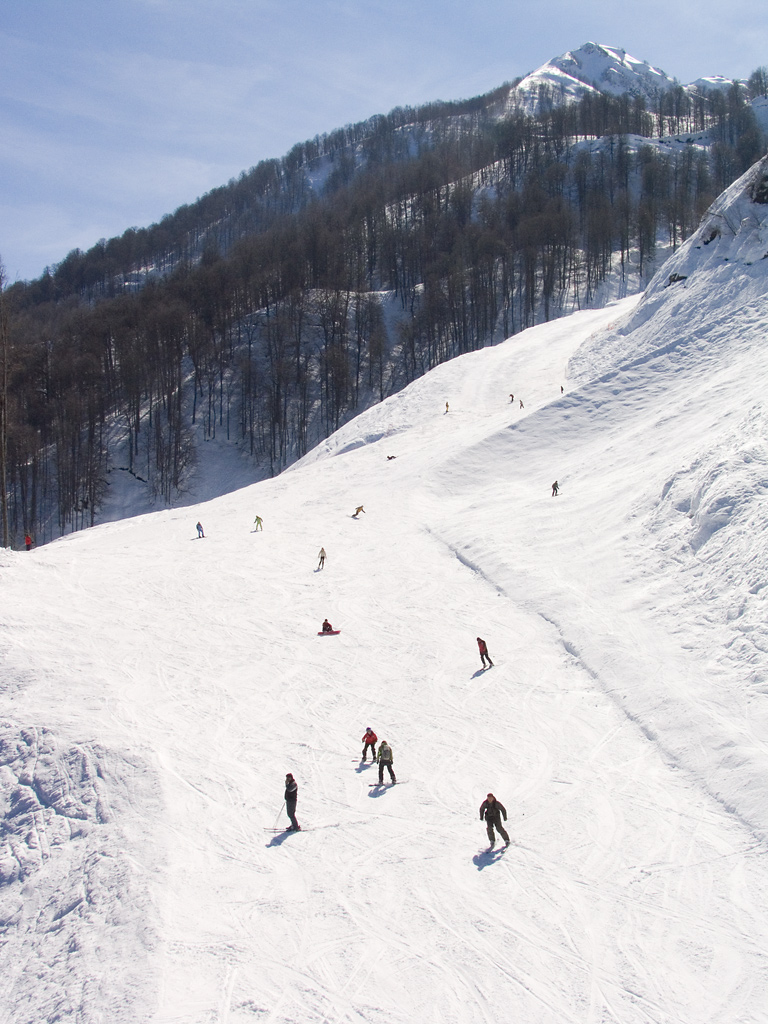
Ski slope in Krasnaya Polyana

== Etymology ==
The name "Krasnaya Polyana" (lit. Red Glade) was given by the Greek settlers in 1878 because of the thick overgrowth of fern, the leaves of which had a reddish-brown color in fall. Walter Richmond, a historian of the Circassian genocide, notes that Krasnaya Polyana was named after the last stand by the Abkhaz Akhchipsou tribe, of whom many were killed there in 1864.

== History ==
Although the vicinity is rich in prehistoric dolmens and contains ruins of about twenty medieval forts, the settlement first appears in recorded history in 1835, when a Russian spy, Baron Fyodor Tornau, visited the Sadz Abkhazian village of Artquaj in the guise of a Circassian mountaineer. Having spent several days in the village, he recorded his observations in a journal.

By the 1860s, the village was known as Kbaade and became populated with the Akhchipsou branch of the Sadz. In 1864, the area was the scene, significant in Circassian history, of the last battles of the Russian–Circassian War. The village was the site of a massacre, where Russian forces slaughtered the disarmed Circassians, and their families, as they attempted to retreat. The hill the village was located on has since been known as Krasnaya Polyana or Red Hill, due to the blood split there. The abandoned aul was replaced with the new settlement of Krasnaya Polyana in 1869.

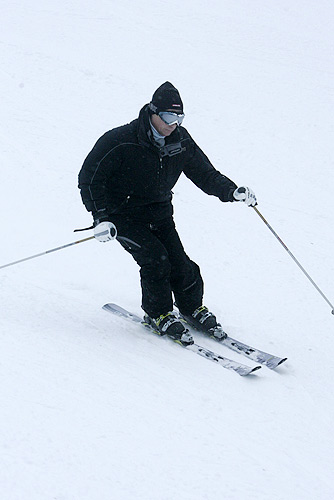
Vladimir Putin at the Krasnaya Polyana ski resort in 2008

On June 19, 1899, Krasnaya Polyana was visited by an official commission under Nikolay Abaza, with a view to transforming it into Tsarskaya Polyana, Nicholas II's hunting ground in the Western Caucasus. A royal hunting lodge was erected in 1901, followed by the chalets of Counts Sheremetev and Bobrinsky, among other nobles and high-placed dignitaries. Although it was never visited by the Tsar, the village was renamed Romanovsk (Романовск), after the ruling imperial dynasty.

Following the October Revolution of 1917, the retreat reverted to its former name and status and gradually dwindled into obscurity. According to the 1926 census, it had a population of 1,207, 57.4% Greek and 9.0% Russian.

The proximity to Sochi, the "summer capital" of Russia, eventually revived its fortunes in the last quarter of the 20th century, when it achieved a modicum of popularity across the former Soviet Union, despite limited hotel capabilities and installations, and difficulty of access through narrow mountain passes.

== Climate ==
Climate data for Krasnaya Polyana (1991–2020, extremes 1936–present)
Month	Jan	Feb	Mar	Apr	May	Jun	Jul	Aug	Sep	Oct	Nov	Dec	Year
Record high °C (°F)	18.1 (64.6)	22.4 (72.3)	27.8 (82.0)	35.6 (96.1)	33.4 (92.1)	35.7 (96.3)	38.5 (101.3)	35.9 (96.6)	35.6 (96.1)	30.8 (87.4)	27.7 (81.9)	21.4 (70.5)	38.5 (101.3)
Mean daily maximum °C (°F)	5.5 (41.9)	7.3 (45.1)	10.9 (51.6)	16.7 (62.1)	21.0 (69.8)	24.5 (76.1)	27.1 (80.8)	27.6 (81.7)	23.4 (74.1)	18.4 (65.1)	12.6 (54.7)	7.2 (45.0)	16.8 (62.3)
Daily mean °C (°F)	1.2 (34.2)	2.1 (35.8)	5.1 (41.2)	10.1 (50.2)	14.6 (58.3)	18.3 (64.9)	20.9 (69.6)	21.0 (69.8)	16.8 (62.2)	12.1 (53.8)	6.6 (43.9)	2.8 (37.0)	11.0 (51.7)
Mean daily minimum °C (°F)	−1.3 (29.7)	−1.1 (30.0)	1.5 (34.7)	5.5 (41.9)	9.8 (49.6)	13.4 (56.1)	15.8 (60.4)	15.8 (60.4)	12.0 (53.6)	7.8 (46.0)	3.1 (37.6)	0.2 (32.4)	6.9 (44.4)
Record low °C (°F)	−22.5 (−8.5)	−18.1 (−0.6)	−15.6 (3.9)	−10.6 (12.9)	−0.4 (31.3)	2.6 (36.7)	7.7 (45.9)	5.2 (41.4)	−1.0 (30.2)	−6.1 (21.0)	−13.2 (8.2)	−15.3 (4.5)	−22.5 (−8.5)
Average precipitation mm (inches)	200 (7.9)	171 (6.7)	182 (7.2)	141 (5.6)	146 (5.7)	119 (4.7)	104 (4.1)	100 (3.9)	145 (5.7)	207 (8.1)	205 (8.1)	216 (8.5)	1,936 (76.2)
Source: Pogoda.ru.net

== Structures ==
- An electricity pylon looking like a snow leopard .

== Economy ==
The economic activity in the village is based on serving tourists and visitors in winter and summer. Krasnaya Polyana is a skiing and snowboarding center.

== 2014 Olympics venues ==
- Sanki Sliding Center, luge, bobsled, and skeleton (moved to Rzhanaya Polyana in May 2009)
- Laura Cross-Country ski and Biathlon Center, biathlon, cross-country skiing, and Nordic combined
- Rosa Khutor Alpine Resort, alpine skiing
- Rosa Khutor Extreme Park, freestyle skiing, snowboarding
- RusSki Gorki Jumping Center, ski jumping and Nordic combined

== Gallery ==
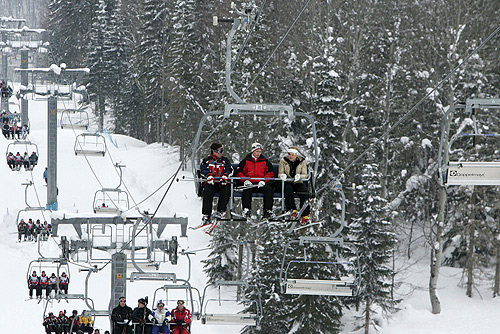
Cable car

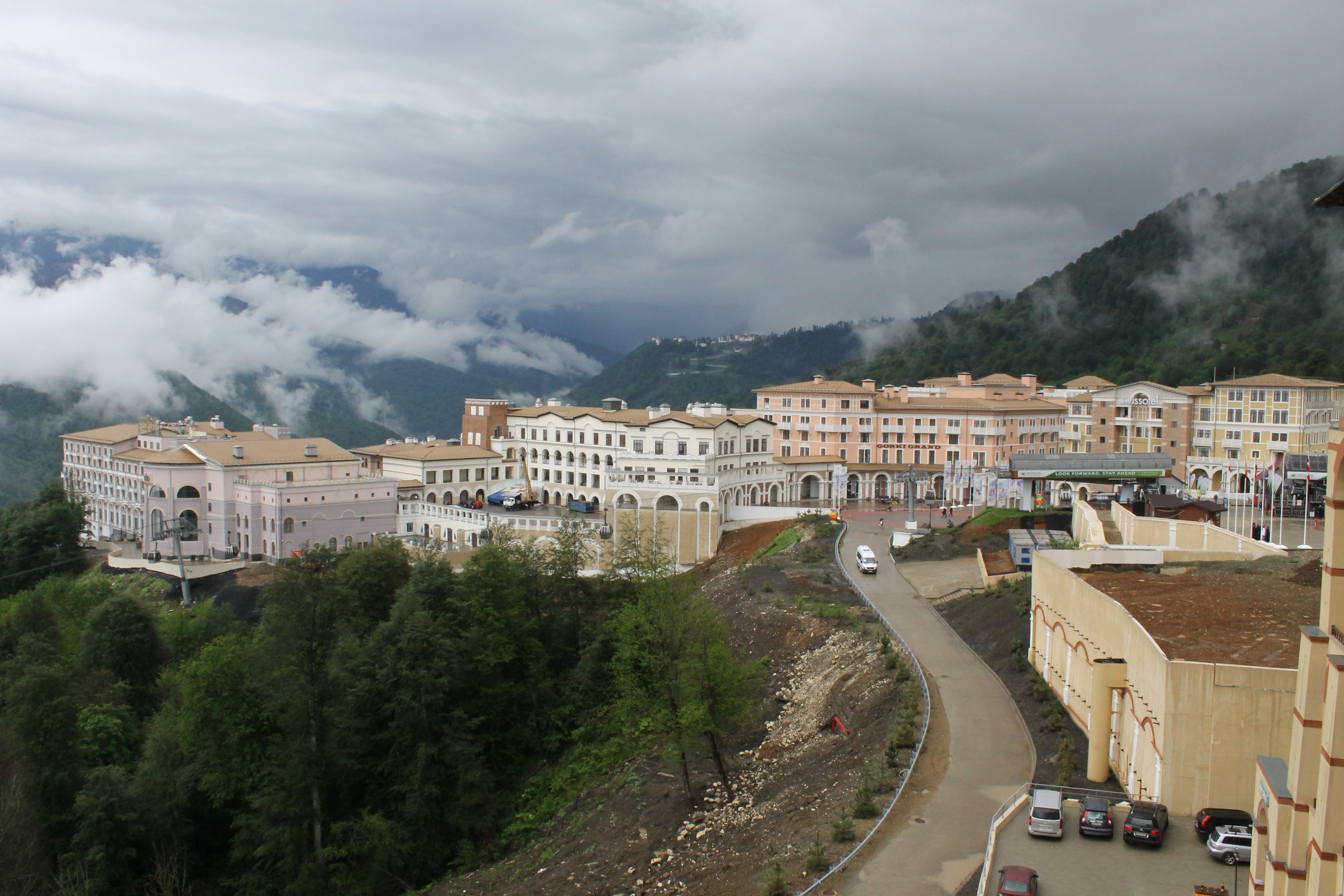
Gorki Gorod and Gornaya Karusel

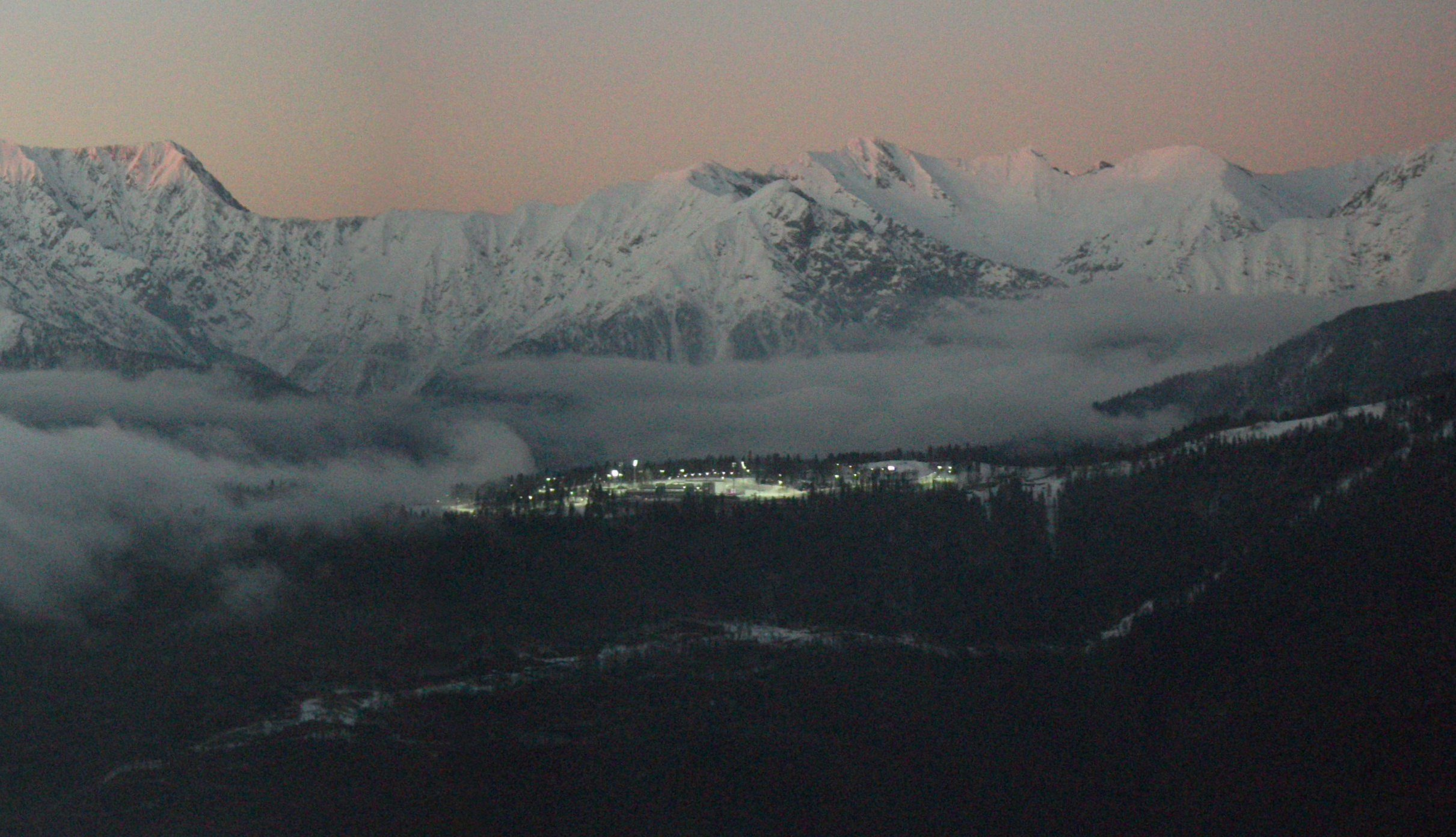
Ski-biathlon complex Laura on the Psekhako Ridge

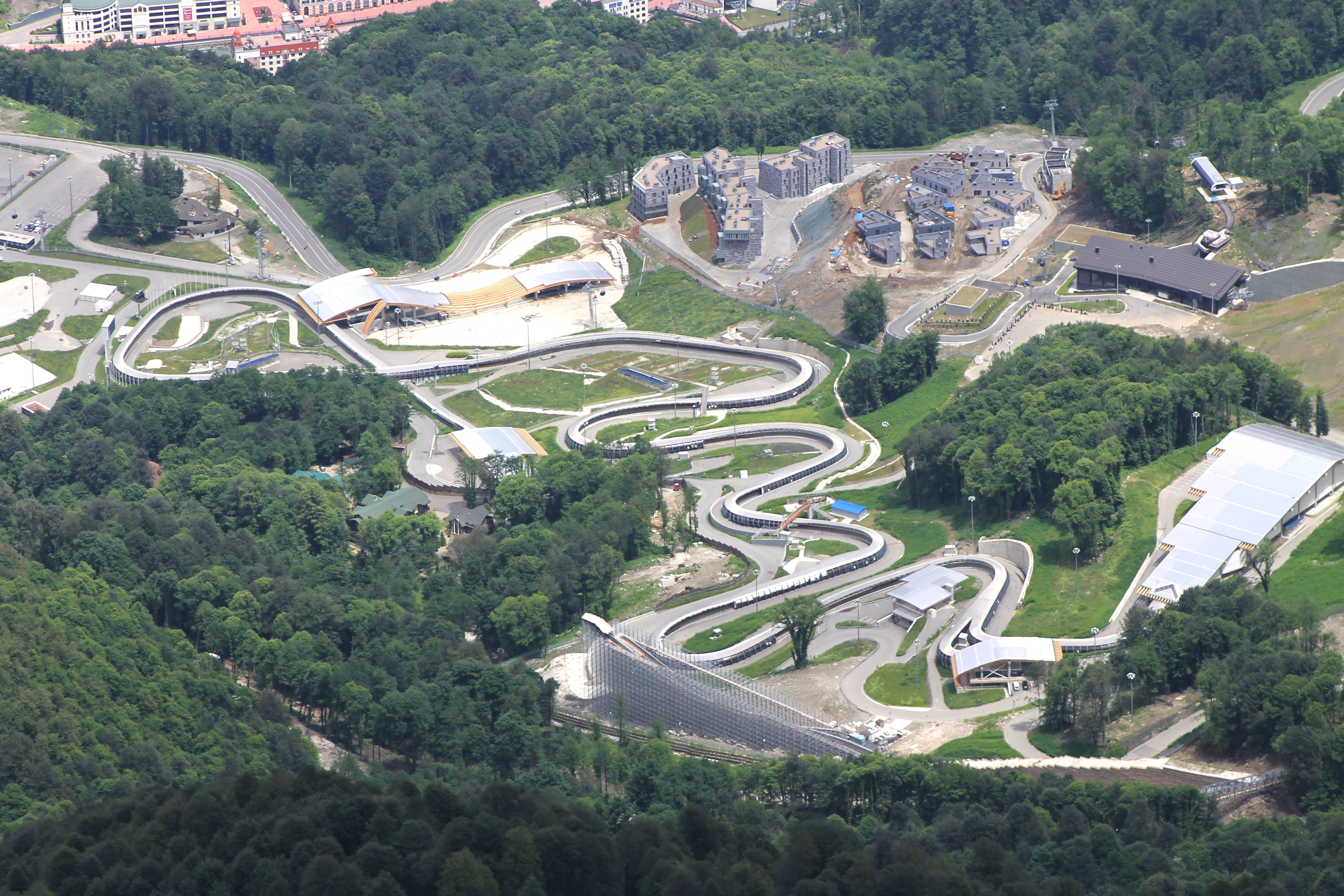
Sledge-bobsleigh track

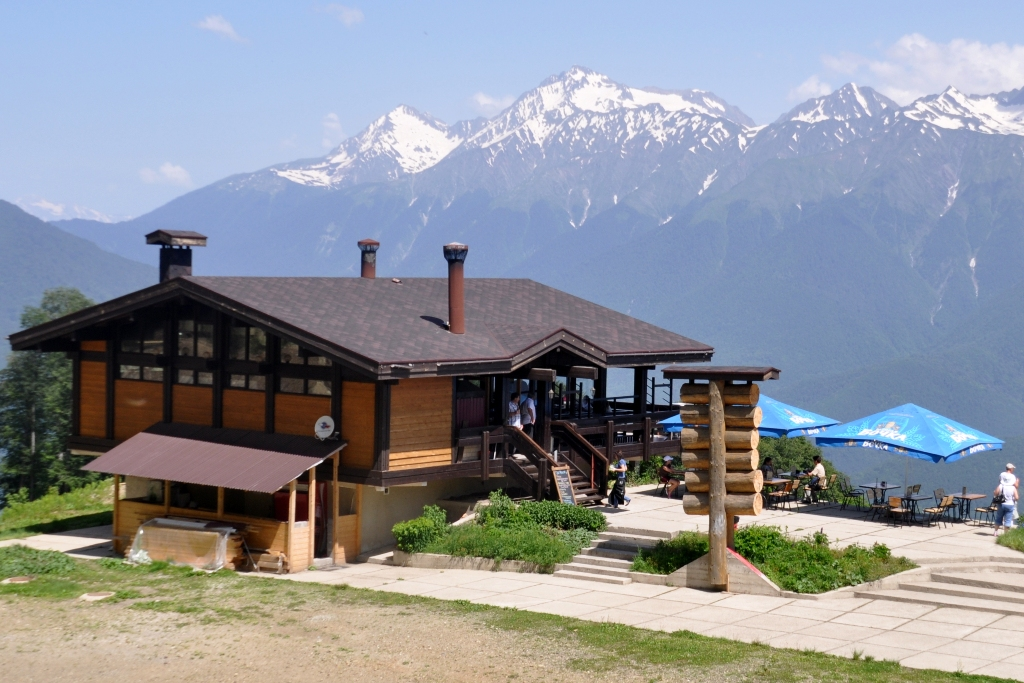
Summer at Krasnaya Polyana

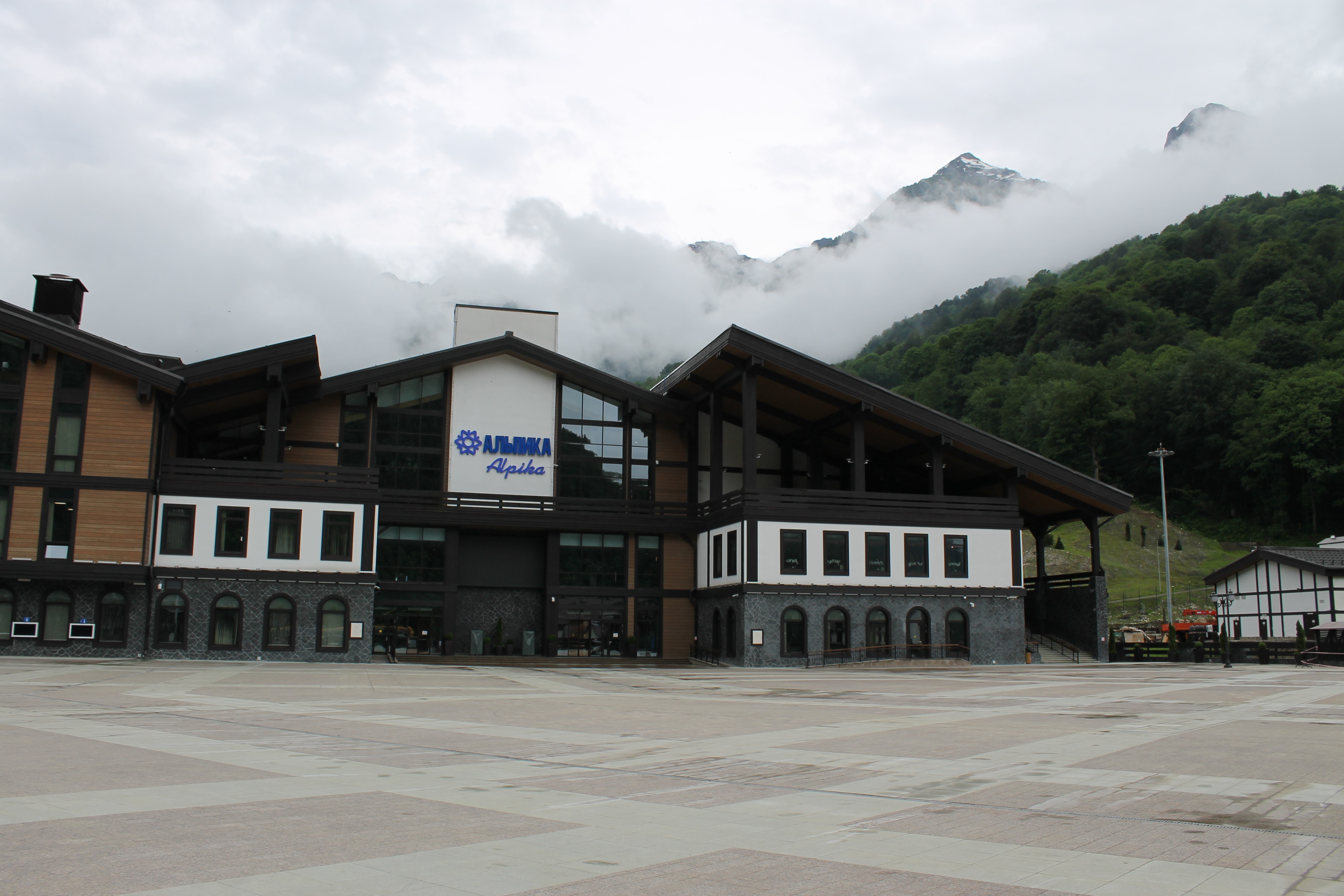
Bottom station Alpika Service
