= Gornaya Karusel =

Coordinates: 43°38′57″N 40°14′58″E

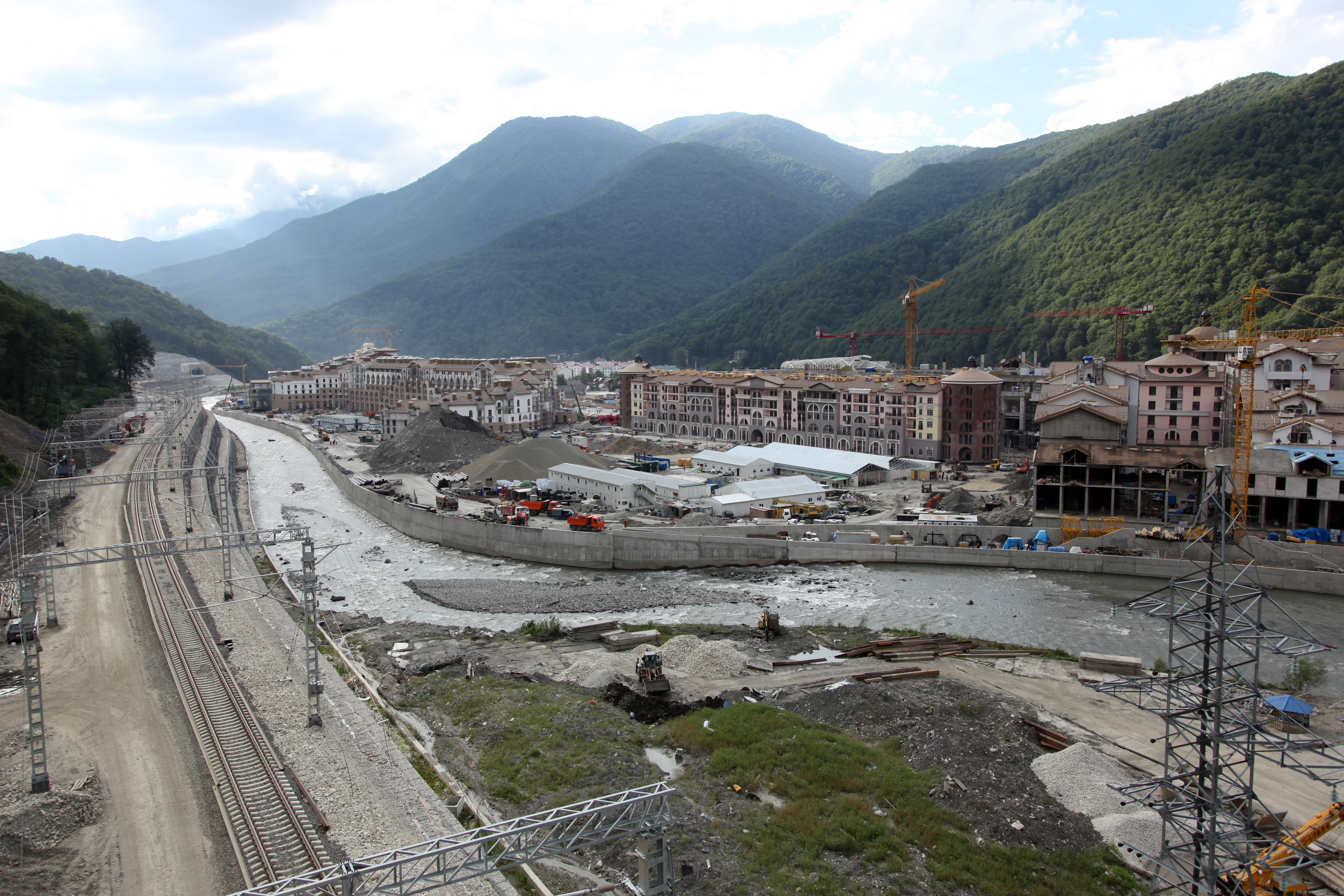
The future hotel village in Estosadok built for Gornaya Karusel, July 2013.

Gornaya Karusel (Russian: Горная Карусель) is a sports and tourism area on the Northern slopes of Mount Aibga in Estosadok, Sochi.

== Skiing area ==
From the launch pad in the valley bottom (540m) three new gondola type ropeways bring the tourists up to three transfer levels (960m, 1460m, 2200m).

== History ==
The sports complex now promoted exclusively under the Russian name Gornaya Karusel (literally Mountain Circus) used to be referred to by the company name Аlpika Service (А́льпика-Се́рвис) which from 1993 on had constructed the first ski lifts for the vast skiing area on the northern slopes of Mount Aibga.

In 2008, Gazprom bought the company for a low price and started to promote the area building new ropeways and several hotel villages to host tourists coming to Krasnaya Polyana during the Olympic Games 2014.

Alpika Service was closed due to court decisions.

== Gallery ==
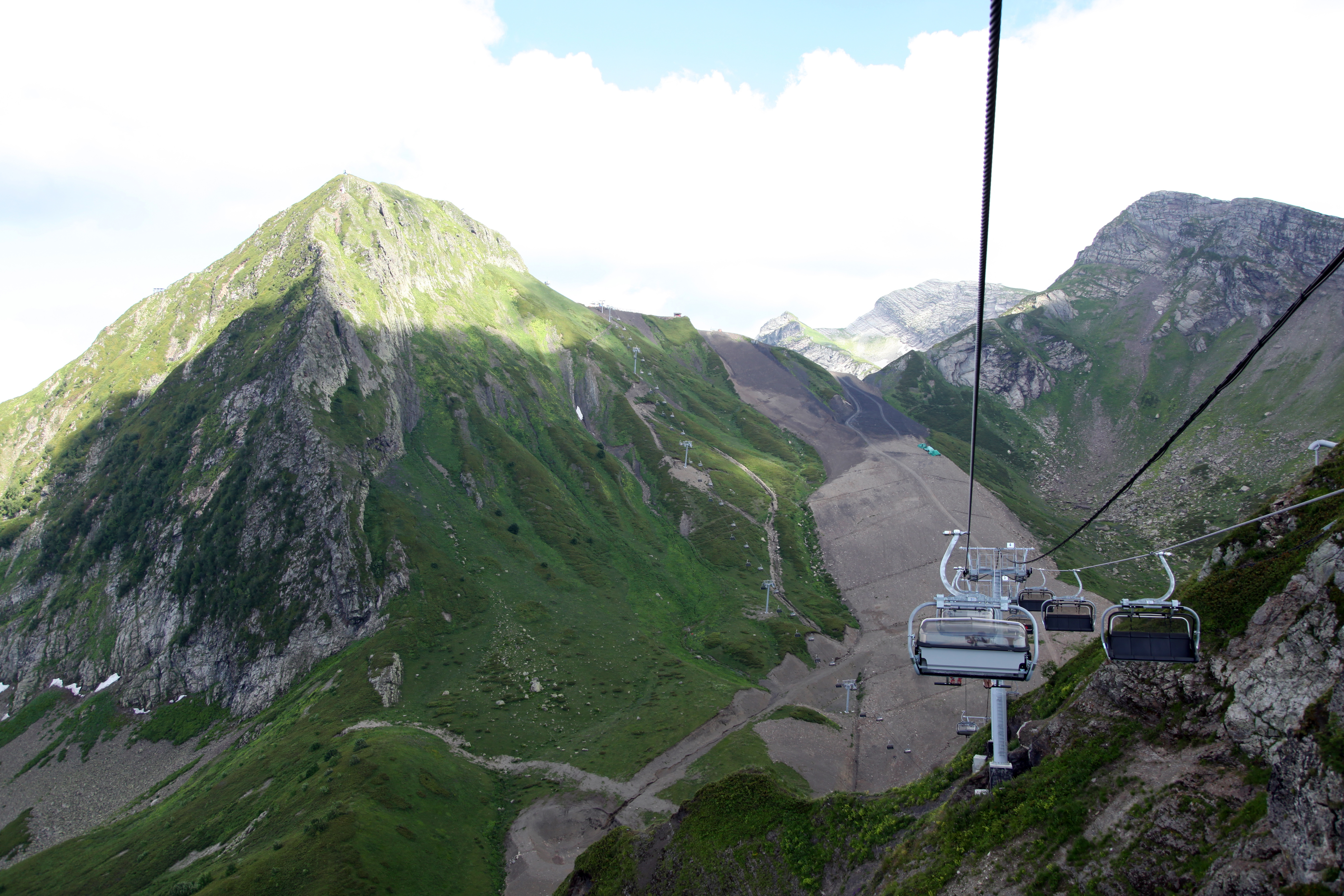
Circus 2 and Circus 3 seen from Mount Aibga in the Gornaya Karusel.

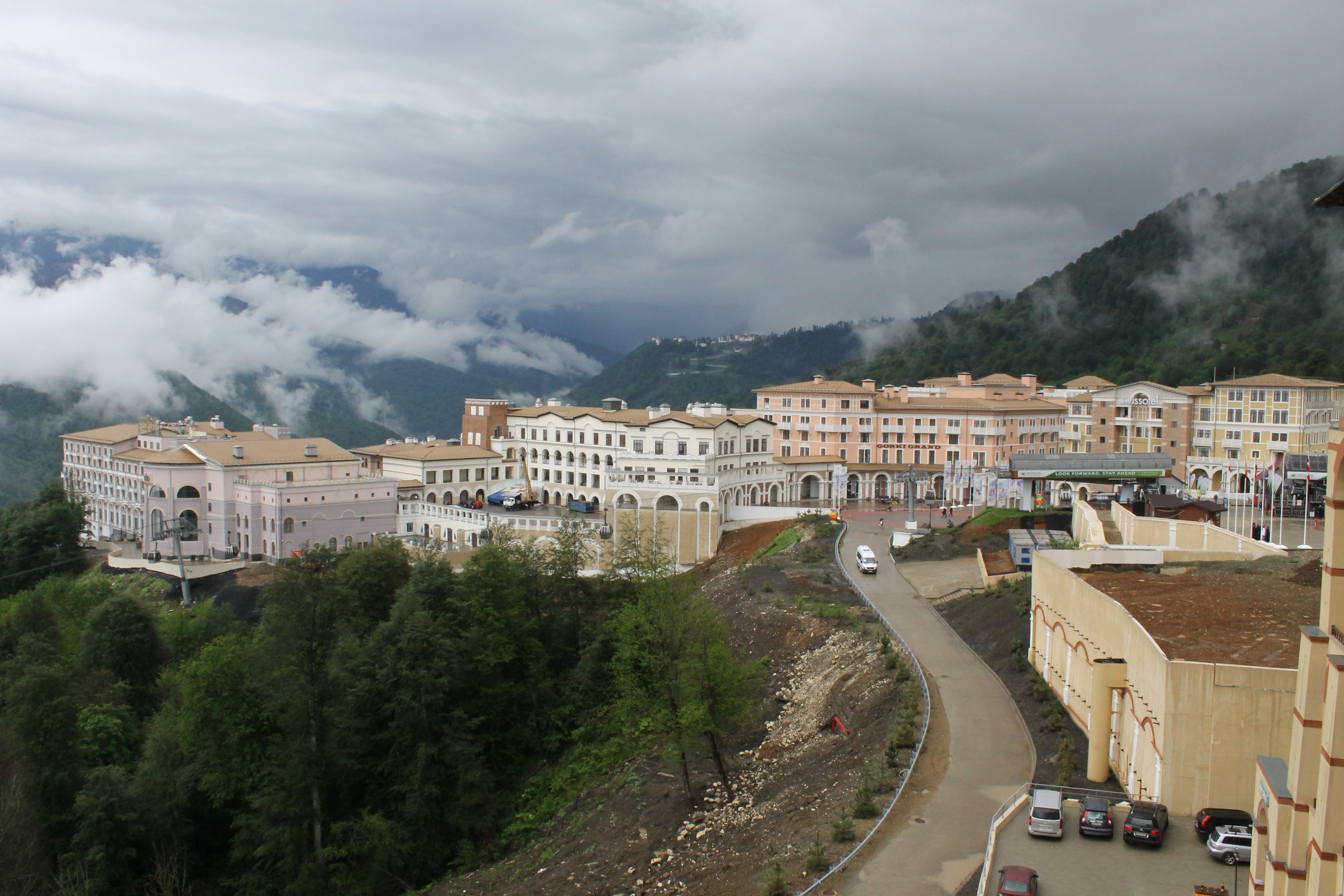
A new hotel village Gorki Gorod +960.

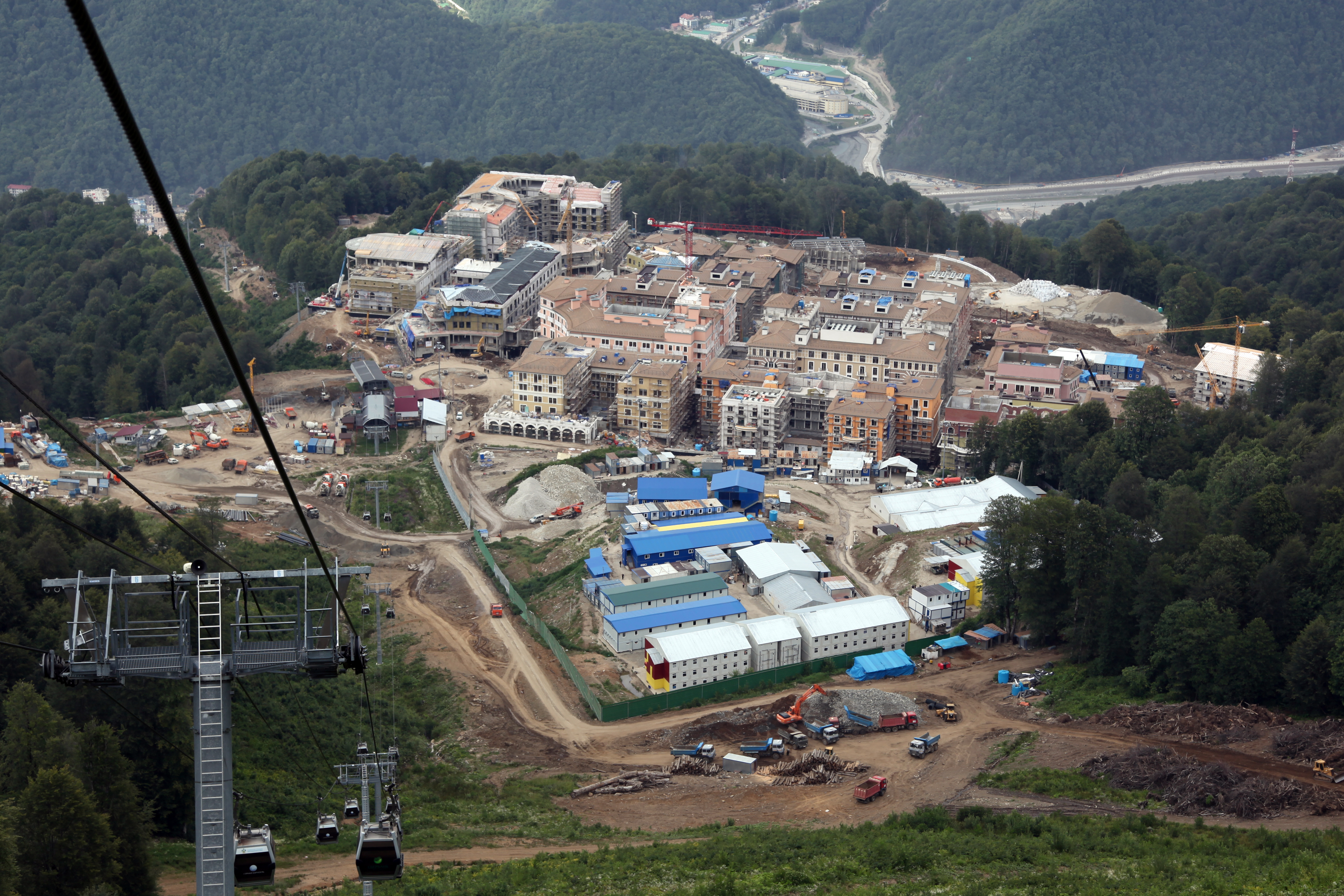
A new postmodern hotel village being built for the skiing area Gornaya Karusel, July 2013.

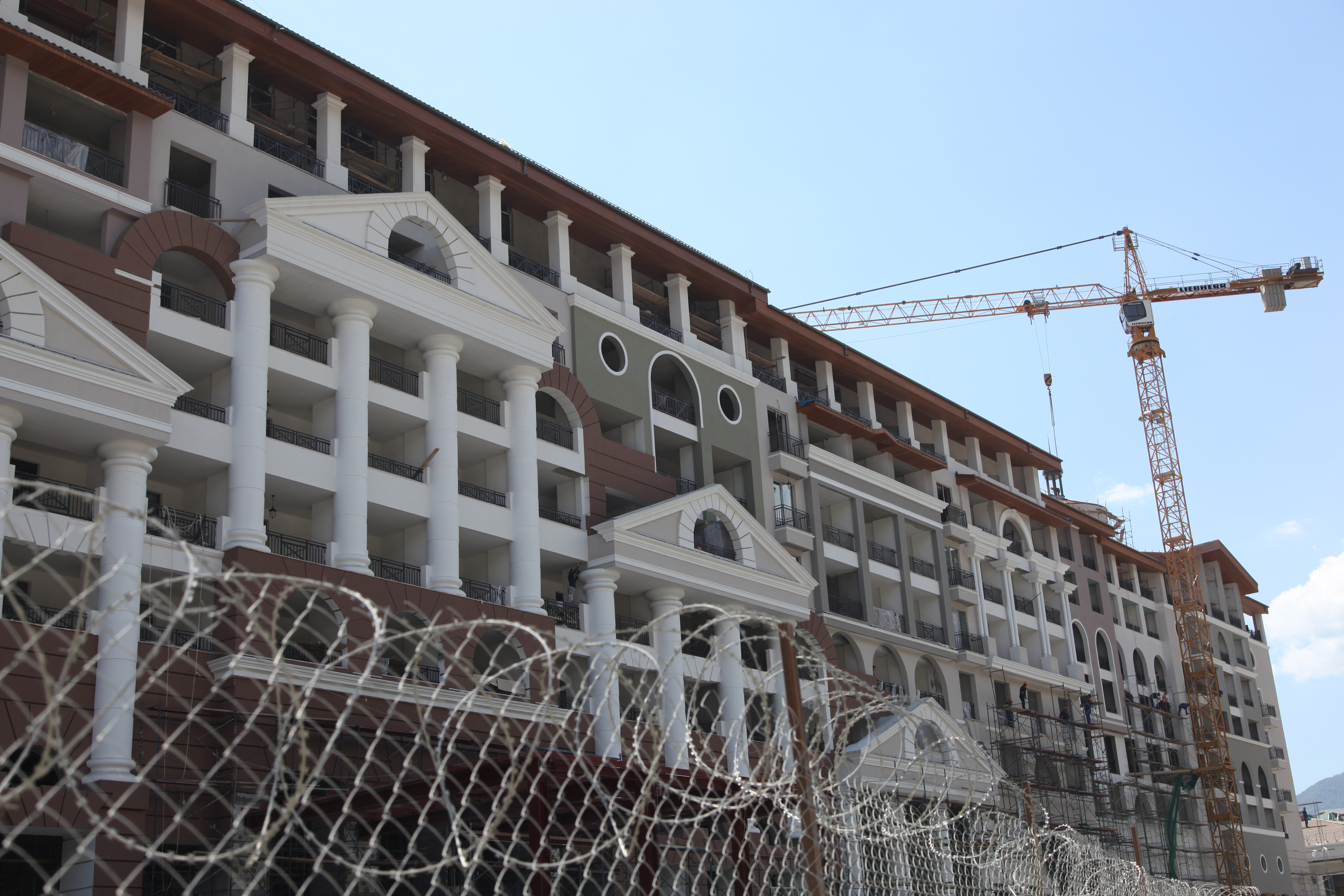
The future Hotel Aibga in Estosadok, built for the Gornaya Karusel skiing area.

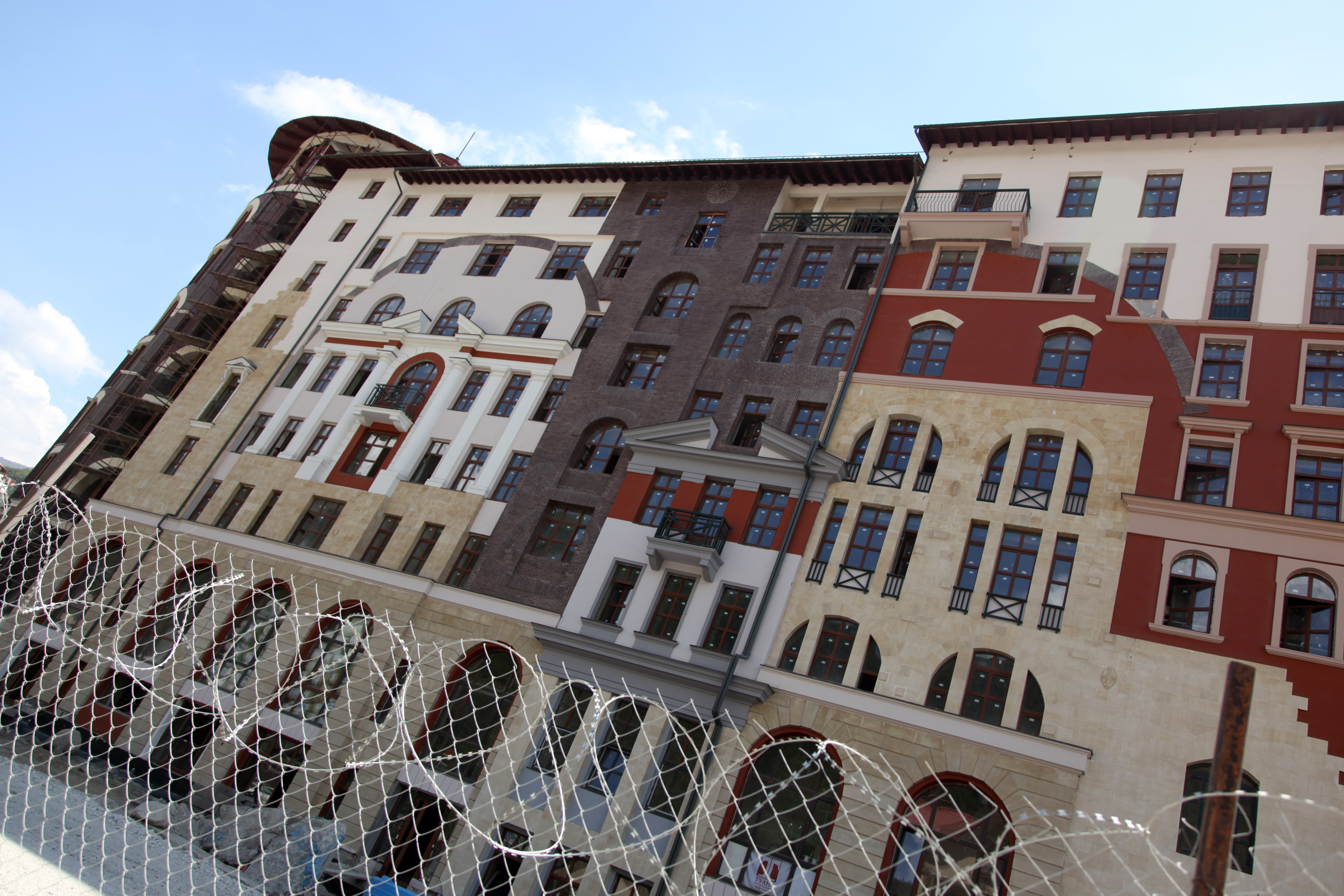
One of many postmodern hotel facades in Estosadok, Gornaya Karusel, July 2013.

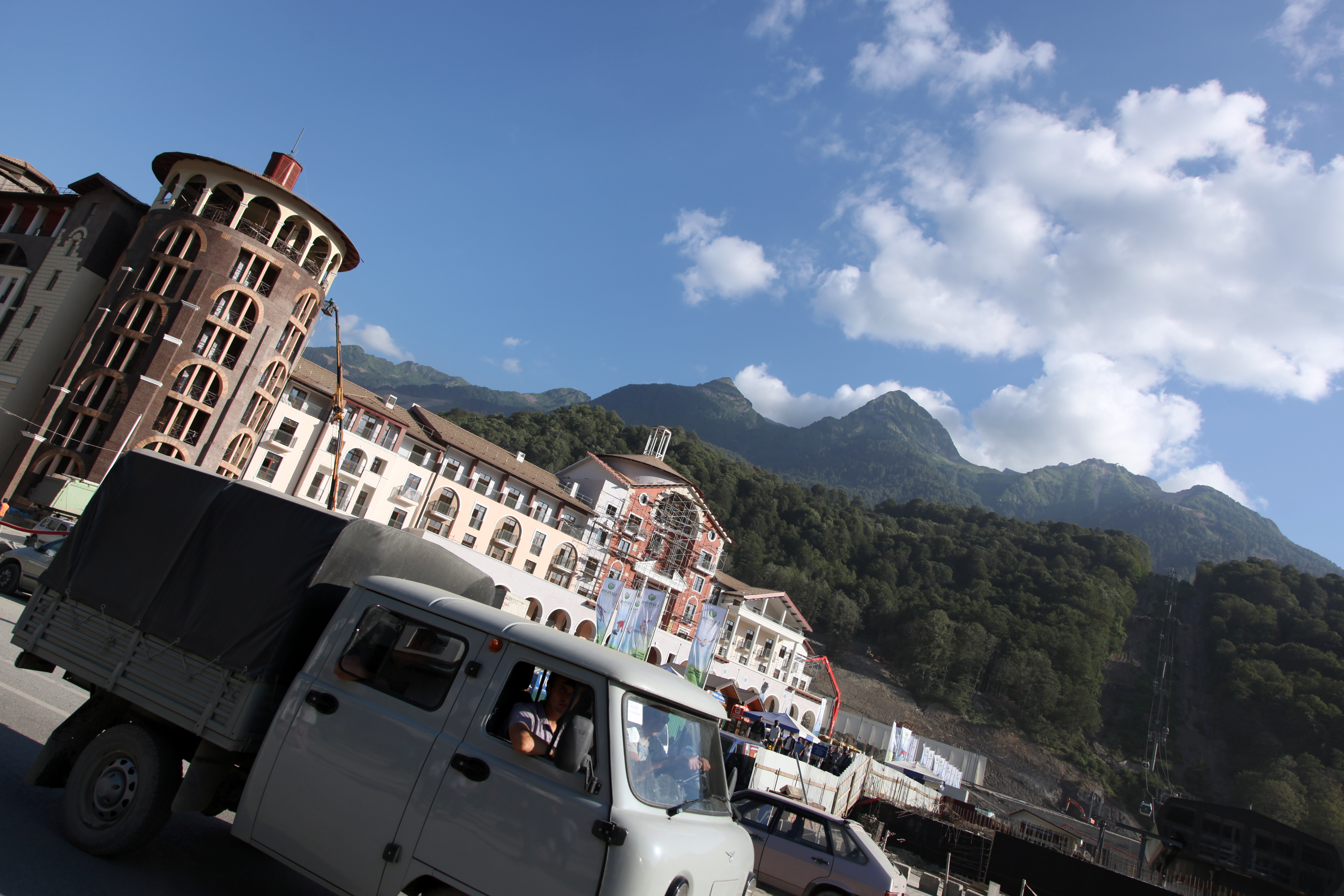
Mount Aibga and the skiing area Gornaya Karusel, in the foreground construction works for the hotel village in Estosadok, July 2013.
