= Belarus at the Paralympics =

- IPC code: BLR
- NPC: Paralympic Committee of the Republic of Belarus
- Medals: Gold 55 Silver 45 Bronze 47 Total 147

Summer appearances
- 1996; 2000; 2004; 2008; 2012; 2016; 2020; 2024

Winter appearances
- 1994; 1998; 2002; 2006; 2010; 2014; 2018; 2022; 2026

Other related appearances
- Soviet Union (1988); Unified Team (1992)

Belarus made its Paralympic Games début at the 1994 Winter Paralympics in Lillehammer. It has participated in every subsequent edition of both the Summer and Winter Paralympics.

Belarusian athletes have won a total of 98 Paralympic medals, of which 27 gold, 37 silver and 34 bronze, placing it 33rd on the all-time Paralympic Games medal table. 78 of Belarus's medals were won at the Summer Paralympics.

Belarus's largest medal haul came at the 2004 Summer Games, with a total of 29, of which 10 gold. In 2022, in response to the country's participation in the Russian invasion of Ukraine, as well its treatment of Belarusian athletes, Belarus was suspended from the Paralympic Games. On 2 March 2022, the International Paralympic Committee (IPC) originally declared that Belarusian athletes would be able to compete as neutral athletes under the designation Paralympic Neutral Athletes, however their decision was reversed the following day and the athletes were banned from competing.

On 29 September 2023, the IPC decided to continue partially suspend both Belarusian and Russian NPCs for two years, with their athletes and their support personnels may participate Paralympic Games under individual and neutral capacity, remarked that this means no teams.

In September 2025, the IPC voted to lift the bans on the Russian and Belarusian National Paralympic Committees, with the countries returning to the Games in 2026.

== Medal tallies ==
=== Summer Paralympics ===
Games	Athletes	Gold	Silver	Bronze	Total	Rank
1960–1984	did not compete					
(South Korea) 1988 Seoul	As part of the Soviet Union (URS)					
(Spain) 1992 Barcelona	Part of the Unified Team (EUN)					
(United States) 1996 Atlanta	15	3	3	7	13	33
(Australia) 2000 Sydney	22	5	8	10	23	28
(Greece) 2004 Athens	33	10	12	7	29	19
(China) 2008 Beijing	33	5	7	1	13	21
(United Kingdom) 2012 London	31	5	2	3	10	25
(Brazil) 2016 Rio de Janeiro	20	8	0	2	10	19
(Japan) 2020 Tokyo	19	5	1	1	7	27
(France) Paris 2024	As the Neutral Paralympic Athletes (NPA)					
(United States) 2028 Los Angeles	Future events					
(Australia) 2032 Brisbane	Future events					
Total		41	33	31	105	35

=== Medals by Winter Games ===
Games	Athletes	Gold	Silver	Bronze	Total	Rank
1976–1984	did not compete					
(Austria) 1988 Innsbruck	Part of the Soviet Union (URS)					
(France) 1992 Tignes-Albertville	Part of the Unified Team (EUN)					
(Norway) 1994 Lillehammer	2	0	0	0	0	–
(Japan) 1998 Nagano	5	0	0	0	0	–
(United States) 2002 Salt Lake City	4	1	1	0	2	16
(Italy) 2006 Turin	6	1	6	2	9	11
(Canada) 2010 Vancouver	9	2	0	7	9	9
(Russia) 2014 Sochi	10	0	0	3	3	18
(South Korea) 2018 PyeongChang	14	4	4	4	12	8
(China) 2022 Beijing	Banned					
(Italy) 2026 Cortina d'Ampezzo	4	1	1	0	2	17
Total		9	12	16	37	21

== Medalists ==
=== Summer Paralympics ===
Medal	Name	Games	Sport	Event
Gold	Oleg Chepel	(United States) 1996 Atlanta	Athletics	Men's high jump F10-11
Gold	Iryna Leantsiuk	(United States) 1996 Atlanta	Athletics	Women's long jump F42-46
Gold	Tamara Sivakova	(United States) 1996 Atlanta	Athletics	Women's shot put F12
Silver	Ihar Fartunau	(United States) 1996 Atlanta	Athletics	Men's long jump F12
Silver	Ihar Fartunau	(United States) 1996 Atlanta	Athletics	Men's triple jump F12
Silver	N. Denissevitch	(United States) 1996 Atlanta	Athletics	Men's shot put F10
Bronze	Victor Joukovski	(United States) 1996 Atlanta	Athletics	Men's pentathlon P10
Bronze	N. Denissevitch	(United States) 1996 Atlanta	Athletics	Men's discus throw F10
Bronze	Victor Joukovski	(United States) 1996 Atlanta	Athletics	Men's pentathlon P10
Bronze	Ihar Fartunau	(United States) 1996 Atlanta	Athletics	Men's pentathlon P12
Bronze	Iryna Leantsiuk	(United States) 1996 Atlanta	Athletics	Women's 200m T42-46
Bronze	Tamara Sivakova	(United States) 1996 Atlanta	Athletics	Women's discus throw F12
Bronze	Yadviha Skorabahataya	(United States) 1996 Atlanta	Athletics	Women's javelin throw F10-11
Gold	Ruslan Sivitski	(Australia) 2000 Sydney	Athletics	Men's high jump F12
Gold	Volha Shuliakouskaya	(Australia) 2000 Sydney	Athletics	Women's 200m T12
Gold	Iryna Fiadotava; Aliaksandr Danilik	(Australia) 2000 Sydney	Cycling	Mixed tandem open
Gold	Iryna Fiadotava; Aliaksandr Danilik	(Australia) 2000 Sydney	Cycling	Mixed individual pursuit tandem open
Gold	Raman Makarau	(Australia) 2000 Sydney	Swimming	Men's 100m butterfly S12
Silver	Aliaksandr Tryputs	(Australia) 2000 Sydney	Athletics	Men's javelin throw F12
Silver	Viktar Khilmonchyk	(Australia) 2000 Sydney	Athletics	Men's shot put F42
Silver	Ruslan Sivitski	(Australia) 2000 Sydney	Athletics	Men's triple jump F12
Silver	Tamara Sivakova	(Australia) 2000 Sydney	Athletics	Women's discus throw F13
Silver	Aksana Sivitskaya	(Australia) 2000 Sydney	Athletics	Women's long jump F12
Silver	Iryna Leantsiuk	(Australia) 2000 Sydney	Athletics	Women's long jump F46
Silver	Raman Makarau	(Australia) 2000 Sydney	Swimming	Men's 100m backstroke S12
Silver	Raman Makarau	(Australia) 2000 Sydney	Swimming	Men's 200m individual medley SM12
Bronze	Oleg Chepel	(Australia) 2000 Sydney	Athletics	Men's 400m T12
Bronze	Aliaksandr Batsian; Oleg Chepel; Vasili Shaptsiaboi; Viktar Zhukouski	(Australia) 2000 Sydney	Athletics	Men's 4x400m relay T13
Bronze	Yury Buchkou	(Australia) 2000 Sydney	Athletics	Men's discus throw F12
Bronze	Viktar Khilmonchyk	(Australia) 2000 Sydney	Athletics	Men's discus throw F42
Bronze	Oleg Chepel	(Australia) 2000 Sydney	Athletics	Men's high jump F12
Bronze	Yury Buchkou	(Australia) 2000 Sydney	Athletics	Men's shot put F12
Bronze	Viktar Zhukouski	(Australia) 2000 Sydney	Athletics	Men's triple jump F11
Bronze	Iryna Leantsiuk	(Australia) 2000 Sydney	Athletics	Women's 100m T46
Bronze	Volha Shuliakouskaya	(Australia) 2000 Sydney	Athletics	Women's long jump F12
Bronze	Yury Rudzenok	(Australia) 2000 Sydney	Swimming	Men's 200m individual medley SM12
Gold	Aliaksandr Tryputs	(Greece) 2004 Athens	Athletics	Men's javelin throw F12
Gold	Ihar Fartunau	(Greece) 2004 Athens	Athletics	Men's pentathlon P13
Gold	Volha Zinkevich	(Greece) 2004 Athens	Athletics	Women's long jump F12
Gold	Tamara Sivakova	(Greece) 2004 Athens	Athletics	Women's shot put F12
Gold	Aliaksandr Danilik; Vasili Shaptsiaboi	(Greece) 2004 Athens	Cycling	Men's tandem road race/time trial B1-3
Gold	Raman Makarau	(Greece) 2004 Athens	Swimming	Men's 100m freestyle S12
Gold	Sergei Punko	(Greece) 2004 Athens	Swimming	Men's 400m freestyle S12
Gold	Raman Makarau	(Greece) 2004 Athens	Swimming	Men's 100m backstroke S12
Gold	Raman Makarau	(Greece) 2004 Athens	Swimming	Men's 100m butterfly S12
Gold	Sergei Punko	(Greece) 2004 Athens	Swimming	Men's 200m individual medley SM12
Silver	Ihar Fartunau	(Greece) 2004 Athens	Athletics	Men's long jump F13
Silver	Aliaksandr Kuzmichou	(Greece) 2004 Athens	Athletics	Men's triple jump F12
Silver	Viktar Khilmonchyk	(Greece) 2004 Athens	Athletics	Men's shot put F42
Silver	Aliaksandr Tryputs	(Greece) 2004 Athens	Athletics	Men's pentathlon P13
Silver	Volha Zinkevich	(Greece) 2004 Athens	Athletics	Women's 100m T12
Silver	Volha Zinkevich	(Greece) 2004 Athens	Athletics	Women's 200m T12
Silver	Tamara Sivakova	(Greece) 2004 Athens	Athletics	Women's discus throw F13
Silver	Raman Makarau	(Greece) 2004 Athens	Swimming	Men's 50m freestyle S12
Silver	Sergei Punko	(Greece) 2004 Athens	Swimming	Men's 100m butterfly S12
Silver	Sergei Punko	(Greece) 2004 Athens	Swimming	Men's 100m breaststroke SB12
Silver	Raman Makarau	(Greece) 2004 Athens	Swimming	Men's 200m individual medley SM12
Silver	Dmitri Kravtsevich; Raman Makarau; Sergei Punko; Yury Rudzenok	(Greece) 2004 Athens	Swimming	Men's 4x100m freestyle relay 49pts
Bronze	Aliaksandr Kuzmichou	(Greece) 2004 Athens	Athletics	Men's 400m T12
Bronze	Siarhei Hrybanan	(Greece) 2004 Athens	Athletics	Men's discus throw F13
Bronze	Hanna Kaniuk	(Greece) 2004 Athens	Athletics	Women's long jump F12
Bronze	Aksana Sivitskaya	(Greece) 2004 Athens	Athletics	Women's long jump F13
Bronze	Sergei Punko	(Greece) 2004 Athens	Swimming	Men's 100m freestyle S12
Bronze	Raman Makarau	(Greece) 2004 Athens	Swimming	Men's 400m freestyle S12
Bronze	Dmitri Kravtsevich; Raman Makarau; Sergei Punko; Yury Rudzenok	(Greece) 2004 Athens	Swimming	Men's 4x100m medley relay 49pts
Gold	Tamara Sivakova	(China) 2008 Beijing	Athletics	Women's discus throw F12-13
Gold	Iryna Fiadotava; Alena Drazdova	(China) 2008 Beijing	Cycling	Women's road race B&VI 1-3
Gold	Sergei Punko	(China) 2008 Beijing	Swimming	Men's 400m freestyle S12
Gold	Raman Makarau	(China) 2008 Beijing	Swimming	Men's 100m butterfly S12
Gold	Dzmitry Salei	(China) 2008 Beijing	Swimming	Men's 100m butterfly S13
Silver	Volha Zinkevich	(China) 2008 Beijing	Athletics	Women's long jump F12
Silver	Tamara Sivakova	(China) 2008 Beijing	Athletics	Women's shot put F12-13
Silver	Iryna Fiadotava; Alena Drazdova	(China) 2008 Beijing	Cycling	Women's time trial B&VI 1-3
Silver	Liudmila Vauchok	(China) 2008 Beijing	Rowing	Women's single sculls
Silver	Sergei Punko	(China) 2008 Beijing	Swimming	Men's 100m breaststroke SB12
Silver	Sergei Punko	(China) 2008 Beijing	Swimming	Men's 100m butterfly S12
Silver	Mikalai Bezyazychny	(China) 2008 Beijing	Wheelchair fencing	Men's épée B
Bronze	Uladzimir Izotau	(China) 2008 Beijing	Swimming	Men's 100m breaststroke SB13
Gold	Ihar Boki	(United Kingdom) 2012 London	Swimming	Men's 100m freestyle S13
Gold	Ihar Boki	(United Kingdom) 2012 London	Swimming	Men's 400m freestyle S13
Gold	Ihar Boki	(United Kingdom) 2012 London	Swimming	Men's 100m backstroke S13
Gold	Ihar Boki	(United Kingdom) 2012 London	Swimming	Men's 100m butterfly S13
Gold	Ihar Boki	(United Kingdom) 2012 London	Swimming	Men's 200m individual medley SM13
Silver	Ihar Boki	(United Kingdom) 2012 London	Swimming	Men's 50m freestyle S13
Silver	Uladzimir Izotau	(United Kingdom) 2012 London	Swimming	Men's 100m breaststroke SB12
Bronze	Aliaksandr Subota	(United Kingdom) 2012 London	Athletics	Men's triple jump F46
Bronze	Anna Kaniuk	(United Kingdom) 2012 London	Athletics	Women's long jump F11/12
Bronze	Liudmila Vauchok	(United Kingdom) 2012 London	Rowing	Women's single sculls
Gold	Ihar Boki	(Brazil) 2016 Rio de Janeiro	Swimming	Men's 50m freestyle S13
Gold	Ihar Boki	(Brazil) 2016 Rio de Janeiro	Swimming	Men's 100m freestyle S13
Gold	Ihar Boki	(Brazil) 2016 Rio de Janeiro	Swimming	Men's 400m freestyle S13
Gold	Ihar Boki	(Brazil) 2016 Rio de Janeiro	Swimming	Men's 100m backstroke S13
Gold	Uladzimir Izotau	(Brazil) 2016 Rio de Janeiro	Swimming	Men's 100m breaststroke SB12
Gold	Ihar Boki	(Brazil) 2016 Rio de Janeiro	Swimming	Men's 100m butterfly S13
Gold	Ihar Boki	(Brazil) 2016 Rio de Janeiro	Swimming	Men's 200m individual medley SM13
Gold	Andrei Pranevich	(Brazil) 2016 Rio de Janeiro	Wheelchair fencing	Men's épée B
Bronze	Ihar Boki	(Brazil) 2016 Rio de Janeiro	Swimming	Men's 100m breaststroke SB13

=== Winter Paralympics ===
Medal	Name	Games	Sport	Event
Gold	Yadviha Skorabahataya; Guide: Vasili Haurukovich	(United States) 2002 Salt Lake City	Cross-country skiing	Women's 5 km classical technique
Silver	Yadviha Skorabahataya; Guide: Vasili Haurukovich	(United States) 2002 Salt Lake City	Cross-country skiing	Women's 10 km free technique
Gold	Liudmila Vauchok	(Italy) 2006 Turin	Cross-country skiing	Women's 10 km sitting
Silver	Siarhei Silchanka	(Italy) 2006 Turin	Cross-country skiing	Men's 5 km standing
Silver	Vasili Shaptsiaboi; Guide: Mikalai Shablouski	(Italy) 2006 Turn	Cross-country skiing	Men's 10 km visually impaired
Silver	Liudmila Vauchok	(Italy) 2006 Turin	Cross-country skiing	Women's 2.5 km sitting
Silver	Liudmila Vauchok	(Italy) 2006 Turin	Cross-country skiing	Women's 5 km sitting
Silver	Yadviha Skorabahataya; Guide: Vasili Hallrukovich	(Italy) 2006 Turin	Cross-country skiing	Women's 15 km visually impaired
Bronze	Vasili Shaptsiaboi; Guide: Mikalai Shablouski	(Italy) 2006 Turin	Cross-country skiing	Men's 20 km visually impaired
Bronze	Yadviha Skorabahataya; Guide: Vasili Haurukovich	(Italy) 2006 Turin	Cross-country skiing	Women's 5 km visually impaired
Gold	Liudmila Vauchok	(Canada) 2010 Vancouver	Cross-country skiing	Women's 5 km classic sitting
Gold	Liudmila Vauchok	(Canada) 2010 Vancouver	Cross-country skiing	Women's 10 km sitting
Bronze	Vasili Shaptsiaboi; Guide: Mikalai Shablouski	(Canada) 2010 Vancouver	Biathlon	Men's visually impaired pursuit
Bronze	Dzmitry Loban	(Canada) 2010 Vancouver	Cross-country skiing	Men's 10 km classic sitting
Bronze	Vasili Shaptsiaboi; Guide: Mikalai Shablouski	(Canada) 2010 Vancouver	Cross-country skiing	Men's 20 km free visually impaired
Bronze	Liudmila Vauchok	(Canada) 2010 Vancouver	Cross-country skiing	Women's 1 km sprint classic
Bronze	Larysa Varona	(Canada) 2010 Vancouver	Cross-country skiing	Women's 5 km classic standing
Bronze	Yadviha Skorabahataya; Guide: Vasili Haurukovich	(Canada) 2010 Vancouver	Cross-country skiing	Women's 15 km free visually impaired
Bronze	Yadviha Skorabahataya; Guide: Vasili Haurukovich; Larysa Varona; Liudmila Vauchok	(Canada) 2010 Vancouver	Cross-country skiing	Women's 3x2.5 km relay open
Bronze	Vasili Shaptsiaboi; Guide: Mikhail Lebedzeu	(Russia) 2014 Sochi	Biathlon	Men's 7.5 km visually impaired
Bronze	Vasili Shaptsiaboi; Guide: Mikhail Lebedzeu	(Russia) 2014 Sochi	Biathlon	Men's 12.5 km visually impaired
Bronze	Yadviha Skorabahataya; Guide: Iryna Nafranovich	(Russia) 2014 Sochi	Cross-country skiing	Women's 15 km visually impaired
Gold	Yury Holub; Guide: Dzmitry Budzilovich	(South Korea) 2018 Pyeongchang	Biathlon	Men's 12.5 km visually impaired
Gold	Sviatlana Sakhanenka; Guide: Raman Yashchanka	(South Korea) 2018 Pyeongchang	Cross-country skiing	Women's sprint visually impaired
Gold	Sviatlana Sakhanenka; Guide: Raman Yashchanka	(South Korea) 2018 Pyeongchang	Cross-country skiing	Women's 7.5 km visually impaired
Gold	Sviatlana Sakhanenka; Guide: Raman Yashchanka	(South Korea) 2018 Pyeongchang	Cross-country skiing	Women's 15 km freestyle visually impaired
Silver	Yury Holub; Guide: Dzmitry Budzilovich	(South Korea) 2018 Pyeongchang	Biathlon	Men's 7.5 km visually impaired
Silver	Dzmitry Loban	(South Korea) 2018 Pyeongchang	Biathlon	Men's 7.5 km sitting
Silver	Dzmitry Loban	(South Korea) 2018 Pyeongchang	Cross-country skiing	Men's sprint sitting
Silver	Yury Holub; Guide: Dzmitry Budzilovich	(South Korea) 2018 Pyeongchang	Cross-country skiing	Men's 20 km freestyle visually impaired
Bronze	Sviatlana Sakhanenka; Guide: Raman Yashchanka	(South Korea) 2018 Pyeongchang	Biathlon	Women's 6 km visually impaired
Bronze	Lidziya Hrafeyeva	(South Korea) 2018 Pyeongchang	Biathlon	Women's 6 km sitting
Bronze	Lidziya Hrafeyeva	(South Korea) 2018 Pyeongchang	Biathlon	Women's 12.5 km sitting
Bronze	Yury Holub; Guide: Dzmitry Budzilovich	(South Korea) 2018 Pyeongchang	Cross-country skiing	Men's 10 km visually impaired
Gold	Raman Svirydzenka	(Italy) 2026 Milano Cortina	Para cross-country skiing	Men's sprint classical, standing
Silver	Raman Svirydzenka	(Italy) 2026 Milano Cortina	Para cross-country skiing	Men's 10 kilometre classical, standing

== See also ==
- Belarus at the Olympics
