= Cross-country skiing at the 2014 Winter Paralympics – Men's 10 km =

Men's 10km Free at the XI Paralympic Winter Games
- Paralympic cross-country skiing
- Venue: Laura Biathlon & Ski Complex, Krasnaya Polyana, Russia
- Dates: 16 March

Men's 10 km (standing) at the XI Paralympic Winter Games
- Competitors: 38 from 16 nations

Medalists
1st place, gold medalist(s)		Aleksandr Pronkov	Russia
2nd place, silver medalist(s)		Vladimir Kononov	Russia
3rd place, bronze medalist(s)		Vladislav Lekomtcev	Russia

Men's 10 km (sitting) at the XI Paralympic Winter Games
- Competitors: 28 from 13 nations

Medalists
1st place, gold medalist(s)		Chris Klebl	Canada
2nd place, silver medalist(s)		Maksym Yarovyi	Ukraine
3rd place, bronze medalist(s)		Grigory Murygin	Russia

Men's 10 km (visually impaired) at the XI Paralympic Winter Games
- Competitors: 19 from 12 nations

Medalists
1st place, gold medalist(s)		Brian McKeever; Guide: Erik Carleton	Canada
2nd place, silver medalist(s)		Stanislav Chokhlaev; Guide: Maksim Pirogov	Russia
3rd place, bronze medalist(s)		Thomas Clarion; Guide: Julien Bourla	France

The men's 10 km free competition of the 2014 Winter Paralympics was held at Laura Biathlon & Ski Complex near Krasnaya Polyana, Sochi. The competition took place on March 16, 2014.

== Medal table ==
* Host nation (Russia)

Rank	Nation	Gold	Silver	Bronze	Total
1	Canada (CAN)	2	0	0	2
2	Russia (RUS)*	1	2	2	5
3	Ukraine (UKR)	0	1	0	1
4	France (FRA)	0	0	1	1
Totals (4 entries)		3	3	3	9

== Standing ==
Rank	Bib	Name	Country	Real Time	Result	Difference
1st place, gold medalist(s)	69	Aleksandr Pronkov	Russia	27:16.2	23:59.9	-
2nd place, silver medalist(s)	86	Vladimir Kononov	Russia	27:17.2	24:00.7	+0.8
3rd place, bronze medalist(s)	87	Vladislav Lekomtcev	Russia	25:06.8	24:06.5	+6.6
4	88	Rushan Minnegulov	Russia	25:02.6	24:17.5	+17.6
5	85	Kirill Mikhaylov	Russia	25:15.0	24:29.6	+29.7
6	83	Nils-Erik Ulset	Norway	27:39.5	24:37.0	+37.1
7	80	Ilkka Tuomisto	Finland	25:42.0	24:55.7	+55.8
8	79	Benjamin Davet	France	27:19.4	25:08.2	+1:08.3
9	78	Sergey Lapkin	Russia	26:00.3	25:13.5	+1:13.6
10	84	Ihor Reptyukh	Ukraine	26:01.4	25:14.6	+1:14.7
11	81	Mark Arendz	Canada	26:19.6	25:16.4	+1:16.5
12	75	Azat Karachurin	Russia	28:45.4	25:18.4	+1:18.5
13	52	Michael Kurz	Austria	28:37.7	25:45.9	+1:46.0
14	76	Aleksandr Iaremchuk	Russia	26:50.7	25:46.3	+1:46.4
15	67	Siarhei Silchanka	Belarus	26:37.7	25:49.8	+1:49.9
16	74	Grygorii Vovchynskyi	Ukraine	26:50.4	26:02.1	+2:02.2
17	82	Yoshihiro Nitta	Japan	27:02.5	26:13.8	+2:13.9
18	77	Hakon Olsrud	Norway	27:11.6	26:22.7	+2:22.8
19	70	Vitalii Sytnyk	Ukraine	27:54.1	26:47.1	+2:47.2
20	65	Witold Skupien	Poland	30:43.8	27:02.5	+3:02.6
21	72	Tino Uhlig	Germany	27:53.8	27:03.6	+3:03.7
22	73	Keiichi Sato	Japan	28:10.9	27:20.2	+3:20.3
23	68	Pablo Javier Robledo	Argentina	28:17.2	27:26.3	+3:26.4
24	63	Zou Dexin	China	29:01.0	27:51.4	3:51.5
25	64	Siarhei Vauchunovich	Belarus	29:04.8	27:55.0	3:55.1
26	71	Vladyslav Maystrenko	Ukraine	28:51.5	27:59.6	+3:59.7
27	66	Lasse Kankkunen	Finland	29:02.1	28:09.8	+4:09.9
28	62	Cheng Shishuai	China	30:50.5	29:36.5	+5:36.6
29	61	Omar Bermejo	United States	31:06.5	29:51.8	+5:51.9
30	57	Juha Harkonen	Finland	30:58.1	30:02.4	+6:02.5
31	60	Ganbold Matmunkh	Mongolia	31:42.8	30:26.7	+6:26.8
32	55	John Oman	United States	31:59.4	31:01.8	+7:01.9
33	54	Keigo Iwamoto	Japan	34:52.9	31:02.7	+7:02.8
34	53	Liu Jianhui	China	32:02.6	31:04.9	+7:05.0
35	56	Du Haitao	China	35:42.7	31:25.6	+7:25.7
36	58	Louis Fortin	Canada	34:21.2	32:58.8	+8:58.9
37	59	Tian Ye	China	34:00.5	32:59.3	+8:59.4
38	51	Yerlan Omarov	Kazakhstan	36:19.9	33:25.5	+9:25.6

== Sitting ==
Rank	Bib	Name	Country	Real Time	Result	Difference
1st place, gold medalist(s)	20	Chris Klebl	Canada	32:50.2	30:52.0	-
2nd place, silver medalist(s)	27	Maksym Yarovyi	Ukraine	36:10.3	31:06.5	+14.5
3rd place, bronze medalist(s)	25	Grigory Murygin	Russia	31:18.2	31:18.2	+26.2
4	28	Roman Petushkov	Russia	31:22.5	31:22.5	+30.5
5	23	Kozo Kubo	Japan	33:40.4	31:39.2	+47.2
6	22	Enzo Masiello	Italy	34:25.7	32:21.8	+1:29.8
7	26	Irek Zaripov	Russia	32:25.2	32:25.2	+1:33.2
8	15	Martin Fleig	Germany	33:35.1	32:34.6	+1:42.6
9	18	Andrew Soule	United States	32:56.1	32:56.1	+2:04.1
10	24	Daniel Cnossen	United States	33:02.0	33:02.0	+2:10.0
11	14	Dzmitry Loban	Belarus	33:27.8	33:27.8	+2:35.8
12	17	Yauheni Lukyanenka	Belarus	33:34.8	33:34.8	+2:42.8
13	16	Romain Rosique	France	36:01.4	33:51.7	+2:59.7
14	9	Aaron Pike	United States	35:03.1	34:00.0	+3:08.0
15	11	Ivan Goncharov	Russia	35:18.2	34:14.7	+3:22.7
16	19	Sean Halsted	United States	35:25.7	34:21.9	+3:29.9
17	10	Kamil Rosiek	Poland	34:36.9	34:36.9	+3:44.9
18	6	Vladmir Gajdiciar	Slovakia	34:42.8	34:42.8	+3:50.8
19	13	Mykhaylo Tkachenko	Ukraine	35:22.6	35:22.6	+4:30.6
20	8	Oleksandr Korniiko	Ukraine	35:23.5	35:23.5	+4:31.5
21	5	Fernando Aranha	Brazil	36:44.0	35:37.9	+4:45.9
22	12	Jeremy Wagner	United States	36:46.7	35:40.5	+4:48.5
23	7	Travis Dodson	United States	35:49.6	35:49.6	+4:57.6
24	3	Yves Bourque	Canada	39:11.5	39:11.5	+8:19.5
25	2	Giordano Tomasoni	Italy	41:01.6	39:47.8	+8:55.8
26	1	Sebastien Fortier	Canada	41:17.7	40:03.4	+9:11.4
DNF	4	Roland Ruepp	Italy			
DNS	21	Trygve Steinar Larsen	Norway			

== Visually impaired ==
Rank	Bib	Name	Country	Real Time	Result	Difference
1st place, gold medalist(s)	118	Brian McKeever; Guide: Erik Carleton	Canada	23:18.1	23:18.1	-
2nd place, silver medalist(s)	119	Stanislav Chokhlaev; Guide: Maksim Pirogov	Russia	26:55.1	23:25.1	+7.0
3rd place, bronze medalist(s)	115	Thomas Clarion; Guide: Julien Bourla	France	27:52.3	24:14.9	+56.8
4	117	Nikolay Polukhin; Guide: Andrey Tokarev	Russia	25:13.4	24:43.1	+1:25.0
5	113	Vasili Shaptsiaboi; Guide: Mikhail Lebedzeu	Belarus	25:23.3	24:52.8	+1:34.7
6	116	Zebastian Modin; Guide: Albin Ackerot	Sweden	29:03.1	25:16.5	+1:58.4
7	106	Jacob Adicoff; Guide: Reid Pletcher	United States	25:43.0	25:43.0	+2:24.9
8	109	Anatolii Kovalevskyi; Guide: Oleksandr Mukshyn	Ukraine	26:21.7	25:50.1	+2:32.0
9	112	Alexsander Artemov; Guide: Ilya Cherepanov	Russia	30:10.4	26:15.0	+2:56.9
10	108	Iaroslav Reshetynskiy; Guide: Dmytro Khurtyk	Ukraine	26:15.3	26:15.3	+2:57.2
11	111	Iurii Utkin; Guide: Vitaliy Kazakov	Ukraine	26:45.8	26:45.8	+3:27.7
12	114	Oleg Ponomarev; Guide: Andrei Romanov	Russia	27:12.7	27:12.7	+3:54.6
13	110	Vladimir Udaltcov; Guide: Ruslan Bogachev	Russia	27:26.3	27:26.3	+4:08.2
14	107	Erik Bye; Guide: Kristian Myhre Hellerud	Norway	28:15.1	28:15.1	+4:57.0
15	105	Kevin Burton; Guide: David Chamberlain	United States	29:00.6	28:25.8	+5:07.7
16	104	Rudolf Klemetti; Guide: Timo Salminen	Finland	30:52.9	30:15.8	+6:57.7
17	103	Kairat Kanafin; Guide: Dmitriy Kolomeyets	Kazakhstan	31:12.8	30:35.3	+7:17.2
18	102	Choi Bogue; Guide: Seo Jeongryun	South Korea	35:24.2	35:24.2	+12:06.1
19	101	Svetoslav Georgiev; Guide: Ivan Birnikov	Bulgaria	37:43.6	36:58.3	+13:40.2

== See also ==
- Cross-country skiing at the 2014 Winter Olympics
