= Belarus at the 2010 Winter Paralympics =

- IPC code: BLR
- NPC: Paralympic Committee of the Republic of Belarus

in Vancouver
- Competitors: 9 in 2 sports
- Flag bearer: Liudmila Vauchok
- Medals Ranked 9th: Gold 2 Silver 0 Bronze 7 Total 9

Winter Paralympics appearances (overview)
- 1994; 1998; 2002; 2006; 2010; 2014; 2018; 2022; 2026

Other related appearances
- Soviet Union (1988); Unified Team (1992)

Belarus sent a delegation to compete at the 2010 Winter Paralympics, in Vancouver. It fielded a total of nine athletes, each of whom competed in both biathlon and cross-country skiing.

== Biathlon ==
Belarus sent nine delegates to participate in the biathlon event at the 2010 Winter Paralympics. The sole medalist was:

- (bronze) Vasili Shaptsiaboi Men's 3 km pursuit, visually impaired

== Cross-country skiing ==
Nine athletes from Belarus entered the Cross-country events at the Paralympics, winning eight of the nine total medals Belarus won. The medalists are:

- (gold) Liudmila Vauchok Women's 5 km, sitting
- (gold) Liudmila Vauchok Women's 10 km, sitting
- (bronze) Liudmila Vauchok Women's 1 km sprint, sitting
- (bronze) Liudmila Vauchok, Larysa Varona & Yadviha Skorabahataya Women's 3x2.5 Relay
- (bronze) Larysa Varona Women's 5 km, standing
- (bronze) Dzmitry Loban Men's 10 km, sitting
- (bronze) Yadviha Skorabahataya Women's 15 km, visually impaired
- (bronze) Vasili Shaptsiaboi Men's 20 km, visually impaired

== See also ==
- Belarus at the 2010 Winter Olympics
- Belarus at the Paralympics
