= Cross-country skiing at the 2014 Winter Paralympics =

Cross-country skiing at the XI Paralympic Winter Games
- Venue: Laura Biathlon & Ski Complex, Krasnaya Polyana, Russia
- Dates: 9–16 March

Cross-country skiing at the 2014 Winter Paralympics were held at the Laura Biathlon & Ski Complex near Krasnaya Polyana, Russia. The twenty events were scheduled to be held between 9–16 March 2014.

== Events ==
The program includes 20 events. The events are mostly divided into three classifications (sitting, standing and visually impaired). For each of these classifications, there are three men's events and three women's events. There are also two relay events which combine classifications. Standing skiers are those that have a locomotive disability but are able to use the same equipment as able-bodied skiers, whereas sitting competitors use a sitski. Skiers with a visual impairment compete with the help of a sighted guide. The skier with the visual impairment and the guide are considered a team, and dual medals are awarded.

Men's events

- 1km sprint (all classifications)
- 10km (all classifications)
- 15km (sitting)
- 20km (standing and visually impaired)

Women's events

- 1km sprint (all classifications)
- 5km (all classifications)
- 12km (sitting)
- 15km (standing and visually impaired)

Relay events

- 4 x 2.5km mixed relay (combined)
- 4 x 2.5km open relay (combined)

== Competition schedule ==
The following is the competition schedule for all twenty events.

All times are (UTC+4).

Date	Time	Event
9 March	10:00	Men's 15 km
9 March	10:00	Women's 12 km
10 March	10:00	Men's 20 km classic
10 March	12:55	Women's 15 km classic
12 March	10:00	Men's 1 km sprint, sitting
12 March	10:20	Women's 1 km sprint, sitting
12 March	10:37	Men's 1 km sprint, standing
12 March	10:57	Women's 1 km sprint, standing
12 March	11:16	Men's 1 km sprint, visually impaired
12 March	11:28	Women's 1 km sprint, visually impaired
12 March	12:30	Men's 1 km sprint, sitting
12 March	12:40	Women's 1 km sprint, sitting
12 March	12:51	Men's 1 km sprint, standing
12 March	13:01	Women's 1 km sprint, standing
12 March	13:12	Men's 1 km sprint, visually impaired
12 March	13:22	Women's 1 km sprint, visually impaired
12 March	13:48	Men's 1 km sprint, sitting
12 March	13:57	Women's 1 km sprint, sitting
12 March	14:06	Men's 1 km sprint, standing
12 March	14:15	Women's 1 km sprint, standing
12 March	14:24	Men's 1 km sprint, visually impaired
12 March	14:33	Women's 1 km sprint, visually impaired
15 March	10:00	4x2.5 km Mixed Relay
15 March	12:00	4x2.5 km Open Relay
16 March	10:00	Men's 10 km free
16 March	11:23	Women's 5 km free
16 March	12:30	Women's 5 km

== Medal summary ==
=== Medal table ===
* Host nation (Russia)

Rank	Nation	Gold	Silver	Bronze	Total
1	Russia (RUS)*	12	9	11	32
2	Canada (CAN)	4	0	0	4
3	Ukraine (UKR)	1	6	3	10
4	Sweden (SWE)	1	2	1	4
5	Norway (NOR)	1	0	1	2
6	Germany (GER)	1	0	0	1
7	United States (USA)	0	2	1	3
8	Finland (FIN)	0	1	0	1
9	France (FRA)	0	0	2	2
10	Belarus (BLR)	0	0	1	1
Totals (10 entries)		20	20	20	60

=== Women's events ===
Event	Class	Gold		Silver		Bronze	
1 kilometre sprint	Visually impaired	Mikhalina Lysova; Guide: Alexey Ivanov; Russia	4:11.5	Elena Remizova; Guide: Natalia Yakimova; Russia	4:17.1	Oksana Shyshkova; Guide: Lada Nesterenko; Ukraine	4:24.6
1 kilometre sprint	Sitting	Mariann Marthinsen; Norway	2:45.6	Tatyana McFadden; United States	2:45.7	Marta Zaynullina; Russia	2:46.6
1 kilometre sprint	Standing	Anna Milenina; Russia	4:26.9	Iuliia Batenkova; Ukraine	4:31.4	Alena Kaufman; Russia	4:31.7
5 kilometres	Visually impaired	Elena Remizova; Guide: Natalia Yakimova; Russia	13:23.8	Mikhalina Lysova; Guide: Alexey Ivanov; Russia	13:27.7	Iuliia Budaleeva; Guide: Tatiana Maltseva; Russia	13:28.6
5 kilometres	Sitting	Andrea Eskau; Germany	16:08.6	Lyudmyla Pavlenko; Ukraine	16:27.0	Oksana Masters; United States	17:04.8
5 kilometres	Standing	Anna Milenina; Russia	13:31.9	Iuliia Batenkova; Ukraine	13:44.4	Oleksandra Kononova; Ukraine	13:46.9
12 kilometres	Sitting	Lyudmyla Pavlenko; Ukraine	38:54:3	Oksana Masters; United States	39:16:0	Svetlana Konovalova; Russia	39:49:8
15 kilometres	Visually impaired	Elena Remizova; Guide: Natalia Yakimova; Russia	49:10.2	Mikhalina Lysova; Guide: Alexey Ivanov; Russia	50:47.5	Yadviha Skorabahataya; Guide: Iryna Nafranovich; Belarus	55:46.5
15 kilometres	Standing	Helene Ripa; Sweden	49:49.2	Iuliia Batenkova; Ukraine	49:53.1	Anna Milenina; Russia	51:27.3

=== Men's events ===
Event	Class	Gold		Silver		Bronze	
1 kilometre sprint	Visually impaired	Brian McKeever; Guide: Graham Nishikawa; Canada	3:59.6	Zebastian Modin; Guide: Albin Ackerot; Sweden	4:01.4	Oleg Ponomarev; Guide: Andrei Romanov; Russia	4:05.0
1 kilometre sprint	Sitting	Roman Petushkov; Russia	2:05.78	Grigory Murygin; Russia	2:08.67	Maksym Yarovyi; Ukraine	2:07.59
1 kilometre sprint	Standing	Kirill Mikhaylov; Russia	3:53.5	Rushan Minnegulov; Russia	3:53.8	Vladislav Lekomtcev; Russia	3:54.6
10 kilometres	Visually impaired	Brian McKeever; Guide: Erik Carleton; Canada	23:18.1	Stanislav Chokhlaev; Guide: Maksim Pirogov; Russia	23:25.1	Thomas Clarion; Guide: Julien Bourla; France	24:14.9
10 kilometres	Sitting	Chris Klebl; Canada	30:52.0	Maksym Yarovyi; Ukraine	31:06.5	Grigory Murygin; Russia	31:18.2
10 kilometres	Standing	Aleksandr Pronkov; Russia	23:59.5	Vladimir Kononov; Russia	24:00.7	Vladislav Lekomtcev; Russia	24:06.5
15 kilometres	Sitting	Roman Petushkov; Russia	40:51.6	Irek Zaripov; Russia	41:55.1	Aleksandr Davidovich; Russia	42:08.6
20 kilometres	Visually impaired	Brian McKeever; Guide: Erik Carleton; Canada	52:37.1	Stanislav Chokhlaev; Guide: Maksim Pirogov; Russia	53:43.3	Zebastian Modin; Guide: Albin Ackerot; Sweden	56:34.9
20 kilometres	Standing	Rushan Minnegulov; Russia	50:55.1	Ilkka Tuomisto; Finland	51:31.5	Vladislav Lekomtcev; Russia	51:44.6

=== Relay events ===
Event	Gold		Silver		Bronze	
4 x 2.5 km Mixed Relay	Russia (RUS); Alena Kaufman; Svetlana Konovalova; Nikolay Polukhin; Guide: Andrey Tokarev; Elena Remizova; Guide: Natalia Yakimova	27:35.6	Sweden (SWE); Zebastian Modin; Guide: Albin Ackerot; Helene Ripa	27:44.3	Norway (NOR); Eirik Bye; Guide: Kristian Myhre Hellerud; Mariann Marthinsen; Nils-Erik Ulset	27:53.6
4 x 2.5 km Open Relay	Russia (RUS); Vladislav Lekomtcev; Rushan Minnegulov; Grigory Murygin; Roman Petushkov	24:22.8	Ukraine (UKR); Olena Iurkovska; Vitaliy Lukyanenko; Guide: Borys Babar; Ihor Reptyukh; Iurii Utkin; Guide: Vitaliy Kazakov	25:17.9	France (FRA); Thomas Clarion; Guide: Julien Bourla; Benjamin Daviet	25:30.3

== See also ==
- Cross-country skiing at the 2014 Winter Olympics
