= Cross-country skiing at the 2014 Winter Paralympics – Women's 15 km Free =

Women's 15km Free at the XI Paralympic Winter Games
- Paralympic cross-country skiing
- Venue: Laura Biathlon & Ski Complex, Krasnaya Polyana, Russia
- Dates: 9 & 10 March

Women's 15 km (standing) at the XI Paralympic Winter Games
- Competitors: 12 from 7 nations

Medalists
1st place, gold medalist(s)		Helene Ripa	Sweden
2nd place, silver medalist(s)		Iuliia Batenkova	Ukraine
3rd place, bronze medalist(s)		Anna Milenina	Russia

Women's 12 km (sitting) at the XI Paralympic Winter Games
- Competitors: 17 from 8 nations

Medalists
1st place, gold medalist(s)		Lyudmyla Pavlenko	Ukraine
2nd place, silver medalist(s)		Oksana Masters	United States
3rd place, bronze medalist(s)		Svetlana Konovalova	Russia

Women's 15 km (visually impaired) at the XI Paralympic Winter Games
- Competitors: 4 from 3 nations

Medalists
1st place, gold medalist(s)		Elena Remizova; Guide: Natalia Yakimova	Russia
2nd place, silver medalist(s)		Mikhalina Lysova; Guide: Alexey Ivanov	Russia
3rd place, bronze medalist(s)		Yadviha Skorabahataya; Guide: Iryna Nafranovich	Belarus

The women's 15 km Free competition of the 2014 Winter Paralympics was held at Laura Biathlon & Ski Complex near Krasnaya Polyana, Sochi. The sitting 12 km competition took place on 9 March 2014 and the standing and visually impaired competition took place on 10 March 2014.

== Medal table ==
* Host nation (Russia)

Rank	Nation	Gold	Silver	Bronze	Total
1	Russia (RUS)*	1	1	2	4
2	Ukraine (UKR)	1	1	0	2
3	Sweden (SWE)	1	0	0	1
4	United States (USA)	0	1	0	1
5	Belarus (BLR)	0	0	1	1
Totals (5 entries)		3	3	3	9

== Standing ==
Rank	Bib	Name	Country	Real Time	Result	Difference
1st place, gold medalist(s)	108	Helene Ripa	Sweden	54:09.1	49:49.2	-
2nd place, silver medalist(s)	110	Iuliia Batenkova	Ukraine	55:25.7	49:53.1	+3.9
3rd place, bronze medalist(s)	109	Anna Milenina	Russia	56:32.6	51:27.3	+1:38.1
4	107	Larysa Varona	Belarus	56:54.2	51:46.9	+1:57.7
5	112	Alena Kaufman	Russia	57:18.9	52:09.4	+2:20.2
6	111	Oleksandra Kononova	Ukraine	59:08.5	53:49.1	+3:59.9
7	102	Marie Karlsen	Norway	1:02:10.0	55:57.0	+6:07.8
8	105	Yurika Abe	Japan	1:02:14.9	56:01.4	+6:12.2
9	106	Liudmyla Liashenko	Ukraine	1:04:18.0	58:30.8	+8:41.6
10	103	Brittany Hudak	Canada	1:05:0.18	59:10.6	+9:21.4
11	101	Kateryna Pavlenko	Ukraine	1:14:10.7	1:07:30.1	+17:40.9
	104	Anne Karen Olsen	Norway	DNF		

== Sitting (12km) ==
Rank	Bib	Name	Country	Real Time	Result	Difference
1st place, gold medalist(s)	114	Lyudmyla Pavlenko	Ukraine	41:23.3	38:54.3	-
2nd place, silver medalist(s)	110	Oksana Masters	United States	39:16.0	39:16.0	+21.7
3rd place, bronze medalist(s)	113	Svetlana Konovalova	Russia	39:49.8	39:49.8	+55.5
4	117	Mariann Marthinsen	Norway	40:00.8	40:00.8	+1:06.5
5	107	Tatyana McFadden	United States	43:13.8	40:38.2	+1:43.9
6	108	Liudmila Vauchok	Belarus	43:32.9	40:56.1	+2:01.8
7	102	Monica Bascio	United States	44:36.8	41:56.2	+3:01.9
8	112	Anja Wicker	Germany	47:05.6	42:23.0	+3:28.7
9	105	Natalia Kocherova	Russia	42:24.6	42:24.6	+3:30.3
10	115	Francesca Porcellato	Italy	49:50.0	42:51.4	+3:57.1
11	106	Valiantsina Shyts	Belarus	47:44.3	42:57.9	+4:03.6
12	103	Birgit Skarstein	Norway	46:22.8	43:35.8	+4:41.5
13	111	Colette Bourgonje	Canada	50:58.5	43:50.3	+4:56.0
14	104	Akzhana Abdikarimova	Russia	48:47.1	43:54.4	+5:00.1
15	109	Nadezda Andreeva	Russia	44:25.9	44:25.9	+5:31.6
16	101	Beth Requist	United States	49:27.1	46:29.1	+7:34.8
DNF	116	Andrea Eskau	Germany			

== Visually impaired ==
Rank	Bib	Name	Country	Real Time	Result	Difference
1st place, gold medalist(s)	134	Elena Remizova; Guide: Natalia Yakimova	Russia	50:10.4	49:10.2	-
2nd place, silver medalist(s)	133	Mikhalina Lysova; Guide: Alexey Ivanov	Russia	51:49.7	50:47.5	+1:37.3
3rd place, bronze medalist(s)	132	Yadviha Skorabahataya; Guide: Iryna Nafranovich	Belarus	56:54.8	55:46.5	+6:36.3
4	131	Margarita Gorbounova; Guide: Andrea Bundon	Canada	1:04:43.9	1:04:43.9	+15:33.7

== See also ==
- Cross-country skiing at the 2014 Winter Olympics
