= Belarus at the 2006 Winter Paralympics =

- IPC code: BLR
- NPC: Paralympic Committee of the Republic of Belarus

in Turin
- Competitors: 6 in 1 sport
- Medals Ranked 11th: Gold 1 Silver 6 Bronze 2 Total 9

Winter Paralympics appearances (overview)
- 1994; 1998; 2002; 2006; 2010; 2014; 2018; 2022; 2026

Other related appearances
- Soviet Union (1988); Unified Team (1992)

Belarus participated in the ninth Winter Paralympics in Turin, Italy.

Belarus entered six athletes in the following sport:

- Nordic skiing: 3 male, 3 female

== Medalists ==
Medal	Name	Sport	Event	Date
Gold	Liudmila Vauchok	Cross-country skiing	Women's long distance, sitting	18 March
Silver	Liudmila Vauchok	Cross-country skiing	Women's short distance, sitting	12 March
Silver	Siarhei Silchanka	Cross-country skiing	Men's short distance, standing	12 March
Silver	Vasily Shaptsiaboi	Cross-country skiing	Men's middle distance, visually impaired	15 March
Silver	Liudmila Vauchok	Cross-country skiing	Women's middle distance, sitting	15 March
Silver	Liudmila Vauchok; Yadviha Skarabahataya; Larysa Varona	Cross-country skiing	Women's 3 × 2.5 km relay	17 March
Silver	Yadviha Skarabahataya	Cross-country skiing	Women's long distance, visually impaired	19 March
Bronze	Yadviha Skarabahataya	Cross-country skiing	Women's middle distance, visually impaired	15 March
Bronze	Vasily Shaptsiaboi	Cross-country skiing	Men's long distance, visually impaired	19 March

== See also ==
- 2006 Winter Paralympics
- Belarus at the 2006 Winter Olympics
