= Athletics at the 2004 Summer Paralympics – Men's shot put F11–13 =

Men's shot put events for blind & visually impaired athletes were held at the 2004 Summer Paralympics in the Athens Olympic Stadium. Events were held in two disability classes.

== F11 ==
Men's Shot Put F11 at the XII Paralympic Games
- Venue: Athens Olympic Stadium
- Dates: 24 September 2004
- Competitors: 7 from 7 nations
- Winning distance: 14.01

Medalists
1st place, gold medalist(s)		David Casinos	Spain
2nd place, silver medalist(s)		Willibald Monschein	Austria
3rd place, bronze medalist(s)		Volodymyr Piddubnyy	Ukraine

The F11 event was won by David Casinos, representing Spain.

24 Sept. 2004, 09:00

Rank	Athlete	Result	Notes
1st place, gold medalist(s)	David Casinos (ESP)	14.01	
2nd place, silver medalist(s)	Willibald Monschein (AUT)	12.27	
3rd place, bronze medalist(s)	Volodymyr Piddubnyy (UKR)	12.23	
4	Sebastian Baldassarri (ARG)	11.81	
5	Loukas Kaskanis (GRE)	11.65	
6	Anibal Bello (VEN)	11.47	
7	Daniel Jimenez (MEX)	10.21	

== F13 ==
Men's Shot Put F13 at the XII Paralympic Games
- Venue: Athens Olympic Stadium
- Dates: 21 September 2004
- Competitors: 11 from 9 nations
- Winning distance: 16.62

Medalists
1st place, gold medalist(s)		Sun Hai Tao	China
2nd place, silver medalist(s)		Alexander Yasinovyi	Ukraine
3rd place, bronze medalist(s)		Russell Short	Australia

The F13 event was won by Sun Hai Tao, representing China.

21 Sept. 2004, 09:00

Rank	Athlete	Result	Notes
1st place, gold medalist(s)	Sun Hai Tao (CHN)	16.62	WR
2nd place, silver medalist(s)	Alexander Yasinovyi (UKR)	15.87	
3rd place, bronze medalist(s)	Russell Short (AUS)	15.54	
4	Yury Buchkou (BLR)	15.01	
5	Rolandas Urbonas (LTU)	14.96	
6	Íñigo García (ESP)	14.96	
7	Siarhei Hrybanan (BLR)	14.14	
8	Vladimir Andryushchenko (RUS)	14.00	
9	Hakim Yahiaoui (ALG)	12.60	
10	Albert van der Mee (NED)	12.58	
	Vasyl Lishchynskyy (UKR)		NMR
