= Cross-country skiing at the 2014 Winter Paralympics – 4 × 2.5 kilometre mixed relay =

Mixed relay at the XI Paralympic Winter Games
- Paralympic cross-country skiing
- Venue: Laura Biathlon & Ski Complex, Krasnaya Polyana, Russia
- Dates: 15 March
- Competitors: 30 from 10 nations
- Winning time: 27:35.6

Medalists
1st place, gold medalist(s)		Svetlana Konovalova; Alena Kaufman; Elena Remizova; Guide: Natalia Yakimova; Nikolay Polukhin; Guide: Andrey Tokarev	Russia
2nd place, silver medalist(s)		Helene Ripa; Zebastian Modin; Guide: Albin Ackerot	Sweden
3rd place, bronze medalist(s)		Mariann Marthinsen; Nils-Erik Ulset; Erik Bye; Guide: Kristian Myhre Hellerud	Norway

The 4 × 2.5 kilometre mixed relay competition of the 2014 Winter Paralympics was held at Laura Biathlon & Ski Complex near Krasnaya Polyana, Sochi. The competition took place on 15 March 2014.

== Results ==
Rank	Bib	Athletes	Country	Times	Total	Difference
1st place, gold medalist(s)	8	Svetlana Konovalova; Alena Kaufman; Elena Remizova; Guide: Natalia Yakimova; Nikolay Polukhin; Guide: Andrey Tokarev	Russia	7:50.7; 6:46.9; 7:17.0; 5:41.0	27:35.6	-
2nd place, silver medalist(s)	3	Helene Ripa; Zebastian Modin; Guide: Albin Ackerot	Sweden	7:38.7; 6:11.3; 7:34.8; 6:19.5	27:44.3	+8.7
3rd place, bronze medalist(s)	7	Mariann Marthinsen; Nils-Erik Ulset; Erik Bye; Guide: Kristian Myhre Hellerud	Norway	7:51.5; 6:15.6; 7:32.0; 6:14.5	27:53.6	+18.0
4	6	Iuliia Batenkova; Oksana Shyshkova; Guide: Lada Nesterenko; Anatolii Kovalevskyi; Guide: Oleksandr Mukshyn; Oleksandra Kononova	Ukraine	8:13.5; 6:41.4; 6:23.4; 6:50.8	28:09.1	+33.5
5	1	Tino Uhlig; Wilhelm Brem; Guide: Florian Grimm; Andrea Eskau	Germany	7:09.6; 6:28.5; 8:05.5; 6:39.2	28:22.8	+47.2
6	9	Tatyana McFadden; Jacob Adicoff; Guide: Reid Pletcher	United States	8:43.0; 5:36.2; 8:36.3; 6:11.2	29:06.7	+1:31.1
7	4	Shoko Ota; Yoshihiro Nitta; Kozo Kubo; Momoko Dekijima	Japan	8:48.8; 5:43.2; 7:38.3; 7:15.3	29:25.6	+1:50.0
8	5	Siarhei Silchanka; Larysa Varona; Liudmila Vauchok	Belarus	8:53.4; 5:52.9; 8:18.9; 6:22.7	29:27.9	+1:52.3
9	10	Seo Vo-Ra-Mi; Choi Bogue; Guide: Seo Jeongryun	South Korea	10:58.5; 7:42.1; 10:37.4; 8:03.3	37:21.3	+9:45.7
	2	Sébastien Fortier; Robbi Wheldon; Margarita Gorbounova; Guide: Andrea Bundon	Canada	8:20.4; 8:35.3; 8:36.2	DNF	

== See also ==
- Cross-country skiing at the 2014 Winter Olympics
