= Cross-country skiing at the 2014 Winter Paralympics – 4 x 2.5 kilometre open relay =

Open Relay at the XI Paralympic Winter Games
- Paralympic cross-country skiing
- Venue: Laura Biathlon & Ski Complex, Krasnaya Polyana, Russia
- Dates: 15 March
- Competitors: 32 from 10 nations
- Winning time: 24:22.8

Medalists
1st place, gold medalist(s)		Roman Petushkov; Vladislav Lekomtcev; Grigory Murygin; Rushan Minnegulov	Russia
2nd place, silver medalist(s)		Olena Iurkovska; Ihor Reptyukh; Iurii Utkin; Guide: Vitaliy Kazakov; Vitaliy Lukyanenko; Guide: Borys Babar	Ukraine
3rd place, bronze medalist(s)		Benjamin Daviet; Thomas Clarion; Guide: Julien Bourla	France

The 4 x 2.5 kilometre open relay competition of the 2014 Winter Paralympics was held at Laura Biathlon & Ski Complex near Krasnaya Polyana, Sochi. The competition took place on 15 March 2014.

== Results ==
Rank	Bib	Athletes	Country	Times	Total	Difference
1st place, gold medalist(s)	4	Roman Petushkov; Vladislav Lekomtcev; Grigory Murygin; Rushan Minnegulov	Russia	6:40.9; 5:24.7; 6:29.7; 5:47.5	24:22.8	-
2nd place, silver medalist(s)	10	Olena Iurkovska; Ihor Reptyukh; Iurii Utkin; Guide: Vitaliy Kazakov; Vitaliy Lukyanenko; Guide: Borys Babar	Ukraine	7:52.2; 5:39.9; 6:09.8; 5:36.0	25:17.9	+55.1
3rd place, bronze medalist(s)	2	Benjamin Daviet; Thomas Clarion; Guide: Julien Bourla	France	6:24.4; 6:11.9; 6:32.4; 6:21.6	25:30.3	+1:07.5
4	8	Christopher Klebl; Brian McKeever; Guides: Erik Carleton, Graham Nishikawa	Canada	7:45.2; 5:19.3; 7:32.2; 5:15.2	25:51.9	+1:29.1
5	5	Yauheni Lukyanenka; Vasili Shaptsiaboi; Guide: Mikhail Lebedzeu; Yadviha Skorabahataya; Guide: Iryna Nafranovich	Belarus	7:05.7; 5:37.2; 7:24.8; 5:56.5	26:04.2	+1:41.4
6	6	Kamil Rosiek; Witold Skupien	Poland	7:05.6; 6:43.7; 7:09.5; 7:02.8	28:01.6	+3:38.8
7	3	Cheng Shishuai; Du Haitao; Liu Jianhui; Zou Dexin	China	7:53.8; 6:50.9; 8:07.7; 6:33.4	29:25.8	+5:03.0
8	7	Maija Järvelä; Juha Harkonen; Rudolf Klemetti; Guide: Timo Salminen; Lasse Kankkunen	Finland	8:34.3; 7:03.7; 7:42.7; 6:34.4	29:55.1	+5:32.3
9	1	Augusto Perez; Omar Bermejo; Brian Price; Kevin Burton; Guide: David Chamberlain	United States	7:54.5; 7:05.0; 8:32.8; 6:26.0	29:58.3	+5:35.5
10	2	Kairat Kanafin; Guide: Dmitriy Kolomeyet; Alexandr Kolyadin; Zhanyl Baltabayeva	Kazakhstan	6:41.4; 6:50.7; 12:00.2; 7:16.5	32:48.8	+8:26.0

== See also ==
- Cross-country skiing at the 2014 Winter Olympics
