= Athletics at the 2004 Summer Paralympics – Men's discus throw F12–13 =

Men's discus throw events for visually impaired athletes were held at the 2004 Summer Paralympics in the Athens Olympic Stadium. Events were held in two disability classes.

== F12 ==
Men's Discus F12 at the XII Paralympic Games
- Venue: Athens Olympic Stadium
- Dates: 27 September 2004
- Competitors: 11 from 10 nations
- Winning distance: 52.51

Medalists
1st place, gold medalist(s)		Sun Hai Tao	China
2nd place, silver medalist(s)		Vladimir Andryushchenko	Russia
3rd place, bronze medalist(s)		Rolandas Urbonas	Lithuania

The F12 event was won by Sun Hai Tao, representing China.

=== Result ===
27 Sept. 2004, 10:30

Rank	Athlete	Result	Notes
1st place, gold medalist(s)	Sun Hai Tao (CHN)	52.51	WR
2nd place, silver medalist(s)	Vladimir Andryushchenko (RUS)	44.49	
3rd place, bronze medalist(s)	Rolandas Urbonas (LTU)	43.32	
4	Vasyl Lishchynskyy (UKR)	43.21	
5	Russell Short (AUS)	42.54	
6	Yury Buchkou (BLR)	41.79	
7	David Casinos (ESP)	38.81	
8	Albert van der Mee (NED)	37.51	
9	Íñigo García (ESP)	34.58	
10	Vincent Martin (USA)	30.40	
11	Willibald Monschein (AUT)	26.83	

== F13 ==
Men's Discus F13 at the XII Paralympic Games
- Venue: Athens Olympic Stadium
- Dates: 25 September 2004
- Competitors: 7 from 6 nations
- Winning distance: 53.54

Medalists
1st place, gold medalist(s)		Alexander Yasinovyi	Ukraine
2nd place, silver medalist(s)		Hakim Yahiaoui	Algeria
3rd place, bronze medalist(s)		Siarhei Hrybanan	Belarus

The F13 event was won by Alexander Yasinovyi, representing Ukraine.

=== Result ===
25 Sept. 2004, 11:15

Rank	Athlete	Result	Notes
1st place, gold medalist(s)	Alexander Yasinovyi (UKR)	53.54	
2nd place, silver medalist(s)	Hakim Yahiaoui (ALG)	44.81	
3rd place, bronze medalist(s)	Siarhei Hrybanan (BLR)	41.85	
4	France Gagne (CAN)	39.25	
5	Zhou Bo Quan (CHN)	35.77	
6	Siarhei Siamianiaka (BLR)	31.02	
7	Yuriy Kvitkov (KAZ)	27.58	
