= Lidziya Loban =

Belarusian Para cross-country skier and biathlete (born 1985)

Personal information
- Born: Lidziya Hrafeyeva; 14 December 1985 (age 40) Novolukoml, Belarus
- Spouse: Dzmitry Loban

Sport
- Country: Belarus
- Sport: Para Nordic skiing (Para cross-country skiing and Para biathlon)
- Disability class: LW12
Medal record
Women's Para biathlon
Representing Belarus
Winter Paralympics
Bronze medal – third place	2018 Pyeongchang	6km sitting

Lidziya Loban (née Hrafeyeva; born 14 December 1985) is a Belarusian Para cross-country skier and biathlete. She has competed at the Winter Paralympics in 2014 and 2018.

== Career ==
She claimed her first Paralympic medal after clinching a bronze medal in the women's 6km sitting biathlon event during the 2018 Winter Paralympics. After claiming the bronze medal at the 2018 Winter Paralympics, she hinted about her plans to step into participate at the Summer Paralympics and hinted about to choose the sport of shooting following her success at the biathlon event which also comprises shooting.

Coincidentally both Lidziya and her husband, Dzmitry Loban went onto represent Belarus at the 2018 Winter Paralympics.

== Personal life ==
Lidziya Hrafeyeva was affected in a car accident at the age of 27, which led to the amputations of her legs. Following the accident, she decided to take the sport of Para Nordic skiing in 2014 before being selected to represent Belarus at the 2014 Winter Paralympics.

She married fellow Belarusian Para Nordic skier, Dzmitry Loban who has represented Belarus at the Paralympics in 2010, 2014 and 2018. Hrafeyeva was also encouraged to take the sport of cross-country skiing by her husband.
