= Monschein =

Monschein is a German surname. Notable people with the surname include:

- Christoph Monschein (born 1992), Austrian football player
- Willibald Monschein (fl. 2002–2004), Austrian paralympic athlete
- Karyn Buczek Monschein (born 1974), American Animator
