= China at the Paralympics =

- IPC code: CHN
- NPC: China Administration of Sports for Persons with Disabilities
- Website: www.cdpf.org.cn
- Medals Ranked 3rd: Gold 663 Silver 509 Bronze 391 Total 1,563

Summer appearances
- 1984; 1988; 1992; 1996; 2000; 2004; 2008; 2012; 2016; 2020; 2024

Winter appearances
- 2002; 2006; 2010; 2014; 2018; 2022; 2026

The People's Republic of China first competed at the Paralympic Games in 1984, at the Summer Games in New York City, United States and Stoke Mandeville, United Kingdom. Since the 2004 Summer Paralympics, China has topped the medal table with more gold medals, more silver medals, more bronze medals and more medals overall than any other nation at every Summer Paralympics.

As of 2026, China finished first in the Summer Paralympics six times and second times in the Winter Paralympics. With the nation's 11th appearance at the Summer and 7th appearance at the Winter Paralympics, China is the most successful country overall in the Asia & Oceania region, making them the 3rd most successful country in the All-time Paralympic Games medal table.

Despite having competed at every Winter Games since Salt Lake City in 2002, China did not win a single medal until the 2018 Winter Paralympics, where China won their first-ever gold medal as well as the first medal in the wheelchair curling competition. Four years later, at home during the 2022 Winter Paralympics, China won medals in all six sports, topped the medal table for the first time at the Winter Paralympics, and became the most successful appearance of the Asian nation, as well as China's best appearance at the Winter Paralympics.

== Medal by games ==
Red border color indicates host nation status.

=== Medals by Summer Games ===
Games	Gold	Silver	Bronze	Total	Rank by Gold medals	Rank by Total medals
(Italy) 1960 Rome	did not participate					
(Japan) 1964 Tokyo	did not participate					
(Israel) 1968 Tel-Aviv	did not participate					
(West Germany) 1972 Heidelberg	did not participate					
(Canada) 1976 Toronto	did not participate					
(Netherlands) 1980 Arnhem	did not participate					
(United States) 1984 New York (United Kingdom) 1984 Stoke Mandeville	2	12	8	22	28	26
(South Korea) 1988 Seoul	17	17	4	38	15	19
(Spain) 1992 Barcelona-Madrid	16	8	7	31	10	18
(United States) 1996 Atlanta	16	10	13	39	9	11
(Australia) 2000 Sydney	34	22	17	73	6	8
(Greece) 2004 Athens	63	46	32	141	1	1
(China) 2008 Beijing	89	70	52	211	1	1
(United Kingdom) 2012 London	95	71	65	231	1	1
(Brazil) 2016 Rio de Janeiro	107	81	51	239	1	1
(Japan) 2020 Tokyo	96	60	51	207	1	1
(France) 2024 Paris	94	76	50	220	1	1
(United States) 2028 Los Angeles	Future event					
Total	629	476	352	1457	3	3

=== Medals by Winter Games ===
Games	Gold	Silver	Bronze	Total	Rank by Gold medals	Rank by Total medals
(Sweden) 1976 Örnsköldsvik	did not participate					
(Norway) 1980 Geilo	did not participate					
(Austria) 1984 Innsbruck	did not participate					
(Austria) 1988 Innsbruck	did not participate					
(France) 1992 Tignes-Albertville	did not participate					
(Norway) 1994 Lillehammer	did not participate					
(Japan) 1998 Nagano	did not participate					
(United States) 2002 Salt Lake City	0	0	0	0	–	–
(Italy) 2006 Turin	0	0	0	0	–	–
(Canada) 2010 Vancouver-Whistler	0	0	0	0	–	–
(Russia) 2014 Sochi	0	0	0	0	–	–
(South Korea) 2018 PyeongChang	1	0	0	1	20	22
(China) 2022 Beijing	18	20	23	61	1	1
(Italy) 2026 Milan-Cortina	15	13	16	44	1	1
(France) 2030 French Alpes	Future events					
(United States) 2034 Utah	Future events					
Total	34	33	39	106	11	13

== Medal by sports ==
Chinese athletes have won medals in most of the current Summer Paralympics sports.
The exceptions are paratriathlon, equestrian and wheelchair rugby.

=== Summer Games ===
Leading in that sport

Sport	Gold	Silver	Bronze	Total
Athletics	208	164	115	487
Swimming	161	146	116	423
Table tennis	89	38	26	153
Wheelchair fencing	44	23	16	83
Powerlifting	42	34	23	99
Shooting	19	12	10	41
Archery	14	10	9	33
Badminton	14	5	3	22
Track cycling	13	12	12	37
Judo	10	11	9	30
Road cycling	5	7	6	18
Rowing	3	3	1	7
Volleyball	3	3	0	6
Boccia	2	4	1	7
Goalball	1	4	1	6
Parataekwondo	1	0	1	2
Wheelchair basketball	0	1	1	2
Football 5-a-side	0	1	0	1
Paracanoeing	0	0	1	1
Wheelchair tennis	0	0	1	1
Totals (20 entries)	629	478	352	1,459

=== Winter Games ===
Leading in that sport

Sport	Gold	Silver	Bronze	Total
Biathlon	12	7	8	27
Cross-country skiing	10	10	10	30
Alpine skiing	5	10	12	27
Snowboarding	5	5	6	16
Wheelchair curling	3	1	0	4
Para ice hockey	0	0	2	2
Totals (6 entries)	35	33	38	106

Best results in non-medaling sports:

Summer
Sport	Rank	Athlete	Event & Year
Equestrian	6th	Peng Yulian	Mixed individual freestyle test grade II in 2008
Paratriathlon	4th	Wang Jiachao	Men's PTS4 in 2020
Wheelchair rugby	8th	China mixed team	Mixed tournament in 2008

== Flagbearer ==
=== Summer Games ===
Games	Opening	Gender	Sport	Closing	Gender	Sport
(United States) 1984 New York (United Kingdom) 1984 Stoke Mandeville	Not documented			None		
(South Korea) 1988 Seoul	Not documented			None		
(Spain) 1992 Barcelona-Madrid	Not documented			None		
(United States) 1996 Atlanta	Zhao Bin	M	Athletics	None		
(Australia) 2000 Sydney	Zhang Haidong	M	Powerlifting	None		
(Greece) 2004 Athens	Zhang Haidong	M	Powerlifting	None		
(China) 2008 Beijing	Wang Xiaofu	M	Swimming	None		
(United Kingdom) 2012 London	Zhang Lixin	F	Athletics	None		
(Brazil) 2016 Rio de Janeiro	Rong Jing	F	Wheelchair fencing	Liu Lei	M	Powerlifting
(Japan) 2020 Tokyo	Zhou Jiamin	F	Archery	Zhang Xuemei	F	Wheelchair basketball
(Japan) 2020 Tokyo	Wang Hao	M	Athletics	Zhang Xuemei	F	Wheelchair basketball
(France) 2024 Paris	Gu Haiyan	F	Wheelchair fencing	Jiang Yuyan	F	Swimming
(France) 2024 Paris	Qi Yongkai	M	Powerlifting	Di Dongdong	M	Athletics
(United States) 2028 Los Angeles	Future event					
(Australia) 2032 Brisbane	Future event					

=== Winter Games ===
Games	Opening	Gender	Sport	Closing	Gender	Sport
(United States) 2002 Salt Lake City	Not documented			None		
(Italy) 2006 Turin	Zhang Jie	M	Paralympic cross-country skiing	None		
(Canada) 2010 Vancouver-Whistler	Cheng Shishuai	M	Paralympic cross-country skiing	None		
(Russia) 2014 Sochi	Tian Ye	M	Paralympic cross-country skiing	None		
(South Korea) 2018 PyeongChang	Peng Yuanyuan	F	Paralympic cross-country skiing	Wang Haitao	M	Wheelchair curling
(China) 2022 Beijing	Wang Zhidong	M	Para ice hockey	Yang Hongqiong	F	Paralympic cross-country skiing
(China) 2022 Beijing	Guo Yujie	F	Para biathlon	Yang Hongqiong	F	Paralympic cross-country skiing
(Italy) 2026 Milano-Cortina	Liu Sitong	F	Para-alpine skiing	Wang Meng	F	Wheelchair curling
(Italy) 2026 Milano-Cortina	Ji Lijia	M	Para snowboard	Cai Jiayun	M	Para biathlon
(Italy) 2026 Milano-Cortina	Ji Lijia	M	Para snowboard	Cai Jiayun	M	Paralympic cross-country skiing
(France) 2030 French Alpes	Future event					
(United States) 2034 Utah	Future event					

== Multi medallists ==
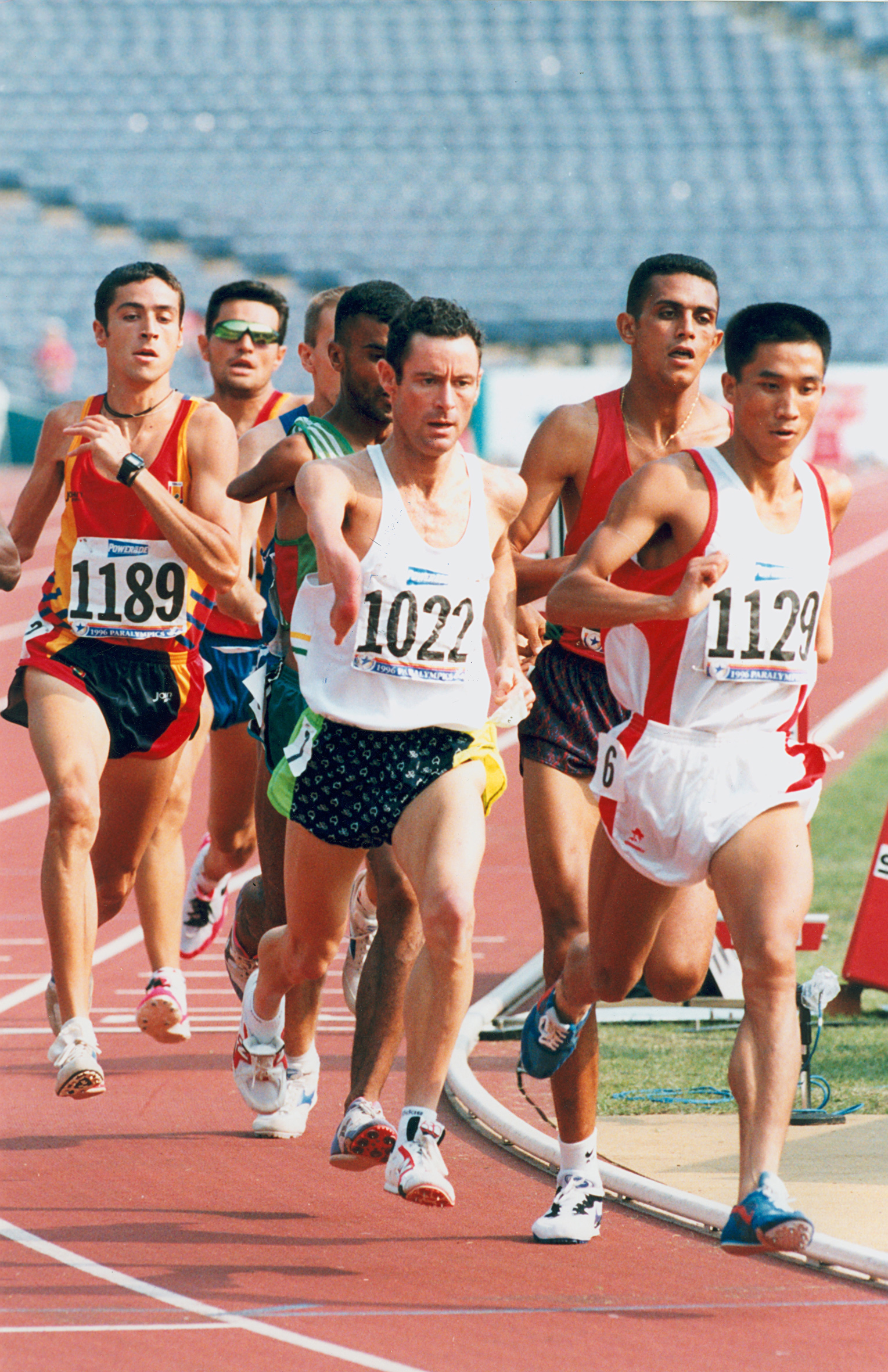
Chinese competitor Yanjian Wu on his way to a silver medal in the T46 1500m event at the 1996 Atlanta Paralympic Games.

Athletes who have won more than three gold medals or five medals:

No.	Athlete	Sport	Years	Games	Gender	Gold	Silver	Bronze	Total
1	Xu Qing	Swimming	2008–2016	3	M	10	0	1	11
2	Zhang Xiaoling	Table tennis	1988–2008	6	F	9	1	2	12
3	Liu Jing	Table tennis	2008-2020	4	F	8	0	0	8
4	Hu Daoliang	Wheelchair fencing	2004-2020	5	M	7	4	1	12
5	He Junquan	Swimming	2000–2012	4	M	7	3	2	12
6	Feng Panfeng	Table tennis	2008-2020	4	M	7	0	1	8
7	Zhang Bian	Table tennis	2008-2020	4	F	7	0	0	7
8	Mi Na	Athletics (field)	2008–2020	4	F	6	3	0	9
9	Zheng Tao	Swimming	2012–2020	3	M	6	1	2	9
9	Du Jianping	Swimming	2004–2012	3	M	6	1	2	9
11	Sun Hai Tao	Athletics (track)	1996–2004	3	M	6	1	1	8
11	Rong Jing	Wheelchair fencing	2016-2020	2	F	6	1	1	8
13	Zhang Li	Swimming	2016-2020	2	F	6	1	0	7
14	Zhou Ying	Table tennis	2008-2020	4	F	6	0	0	6
14	Guo Wei	Athletics (field)	2004–2008	2	M	6	0	0	6
16	Yang Bozun	Swimming	2008–2020	4	M	5	6	5	16
17	Zhou Hongzhuan	Athletics (track)	2008–2020	4	F	5	4	3	12
18	Lu Dong	Swimming	2012-2020	3	F	5	2	0	7
19	Huang Lisha	Athletics (track)	2008–2012	2	F	5	1	1	7
20	Huang Wenpan	Swimming	2016	1	M	5	1	0	6
20	Wen Xiaoyan	Athletics (track)	2016–2020	2	F	5	1	0	6
22	Yao Juan	Athletics (field)	2000–2020	6	F	5	0	0	5
22	Zhang Lixin	Athletics (track)	2008–2012	2	M	5	0	0	5
24	Li Duan	Athletics (field)	2000–2012	4	M	4	2	2	8
25	Sun Gang	Wheelchair fencing	2016-2020	2	M	4	2	1	7
25	Liu Cuiqing	Athletics (track)	2016–2020	2	F	4	2	1	7
27	Zou Liankang	Swimming	2016-2020	2	M	4	2	0	6
27	Liu Wenjun	Athletics (track)	2008–2016	3	F	4	2	0	6
27	Pan Shiyun	Swimming	2012–2016	2	M	4	2	0	6
30	Li Qiang	Athletics (track)	2000–2008	3	M	4	1	0	5
30	Li Huzhao	Athletics (track)	2008–2016	3	M	4	1	0	5
30	Wang Fang	Athletics (track)	2004–2008	2	F	4	1	0	5
33	Zhao Shuai	Table tennis	2012-2020	3	M	4	0	0	4
33	Xue Juan	Table tennis	2016-2020	2	F	4	0	0	4
33	Mao Jingdian	Table tennis	2012-2020	3	F	4	0	0	4
33	Liu Lei	Powerlifting	2008–2020	4	M	4	0	0	4
33	Zhou Xia	Athletics (track)	2016–2020	2	F	4	0	0	4
33	Zou Lijuan	Athletics (field)	2016–2020	2	F	4	0	0	4
33	Yang Yang	Swimming	2012–2016	2	M	4	0	0	4
40	Xu Hong Yan	Athletics (track)	1996–2004	3	F	3	3	0	6
41	Wu Qing	Athletics (field)	2008–2016	3	F	3	2	1	6
42	Xia Dong	Athletics (field)	2008–2012	2	M	3	2	0	5
43	Wang Yinan	Swimming	2012–2016	2	M	3	1	2	6
44	Zheng Baozhu	Athletics (field)	2004–2008	2	F	3	0	1	4
45	Shi Yiting	Athletics (track)	2016-2020	2	F	3	0	0	3
45	Fu Taoying	Powerlifting	2004–2012	3	F	3	0	0	3
45	Yuan Yanping	Judo	2008–2016	3	F	3	0	0	3
45	Wang Zhiming	Athletics (field)	2012	1	F	3	0	0	3
45	Feng Yanke	Wheelchair fencing	2016-2020	2	M	3	0	0	3
45	Cheng Jiao	Swimming	2016	1	F	3	0	0	3
51	Li Yansong	Athletics (track)	2004–2012	3	M	2	3	2	7
52	Wang Jiachao	Swimming	2008–2012	2	M	1	3	1	5
53	Jiang Shengnan	Swimming	2012–2016	2	F	1	0	4	5

=== Multi medals at single Games ===
This is a list of Chinese athletes who have won at least two gold medals in a single Games. Ordered categorically by gold medals earned, sports then year.

No.	Athlete	Sport	Year	Gender	Gold	Silver	Bronze	Total
1	Huang Wenpan	Swimming	2016	M	5	1	0	6
2	Du Jianping	Swimming	2008	M	4	1	1	6
3	He Junquan	Swimming	2004	M	4	0	0	4
3	Yang Yang	Swimming	2012	M	4	0	0	4
5	Yang Bozun	Swimming	2012	M	3	2	1	5
6	Wang Yinan	Swimming	2012	M	3	1	1	5
7	Li Huzhao	Athletics	2008	M	3	1	0	4
7	Zou Liankang	Swimming	2016	M	3	1	0	4
9	Sun Hai Tao	Athletics	1996	M	3	0	0	3
9	Huang Lisha	Athletics	2008	F	3	0	0	3
9	Wang Zhiming	Athletics	2012	M	3	0	0	3
9	Cheng Jiao	Swimming	2016	F	3	0	0	3
9	Rong Jing	Wheelchair fencing	2016	F	3	0	0	3
14	Pan Shiyun	Swimming	2012	M	2	2	0	4
15	Zhou Hongzhuan	Athletics	2012	F	2	1	1	4
16	Li Qiang	Athletics	2000	M	2	1	0	3
16	Wang Fang	Athletics	2004	F	2	1	0	3
16	Xia Dong	Athletics	2008	M	2	1	0	3
16	Liu Fuliang	Athletics	2012	M	2	1	0	3
16	Liu Ping	Athletics	2012	F	2	1	0	3
16	Liu Wenjun	Athletics	2016	F	2	1	0	3
16	Peng Qiuping	Swimming	2016	F	2	1	0	3
23	Zhang Xiaoling	Table tennis	1996	F	2	0	1	3
23	Duan Qifeng	Athletics	2004	M	2	0	1	3
25	Zhang Zhen	Athletics	2008	M	2	0	0	2
25	Yang Liwan	Athletics	2012	F	2	0	0	2
25	Xia Jiangbo	Swimming	2012	F	2	0	0	2
25	Zhou Jiamin	Archery	2016	F	2	0	0	2
25	Zou Lihong	Athletics	2016	F	2	0	0	2

=== Multi medals at a single event ===
This is a list of Chinese athletes who have won at least two gold medals in a single event at the Summer Paralympics. Ordered categorically by medals earned, sports then gold medals earned.

No.	Athlete	Sport	Event	Years	Games	Gender	Gold	Silver	Bronze	Total
1	Zhang Xiaoling	Table tennis	Women's singles	1992–2008	6	F	3	0	2	9
1	Zhang Xiaoling	Table tennis	Women's team	1992–2004	6	F	4	0	0	9
2	Hou Bin	Athletics	High jump	1996–2004	3	M	3	0	0	3
2	Yuan Yanping	Judo	Women's +70 kg	2008–2016	3	F	3	0	0	3
2	Xu Qing	Swimming	Men's 50m butterfly	2008–2016	3	M	3	0	0	3
2	Zhou Ying	Table tennis	Women's singles	2008–2012	2	F	3	0	0	3
6	Li Duan	Athletics	Triple jump	2000–2012	4	M	2	2	0	4
7	Sun Hai Tao	Athletics	Discus throw	1996–2004	3	M	2	1	0	3
7	Xu Hong Yan	Athletics	Discus throw	1996–2004	3	M	2	1	0	3
9	Cui Yanfeng	Athletics	4 × 400 m relay	2008, 2016	3	M	2	0	0	2
9	Fan Liang	Athletics	Discus throw	2004–2008	2	M	2	0	0	2
9	Wu Yancong	Athletics	High jump	2000–2004	2	M	2	0	0	2
9	Yao Juan	Athletics	Javelin throw	2000, 2008	3	F	2	0	0	2
9	Wu Qing	Athletics	Discus throw	2008–2012	3	F	2	0	0	2
9	Zhu Pengkai	Athletics	Javelin throw	2008–2012	2	M	2	0	0	2

== See also ==
- Paralympic competitors for China
- Sports in China
- Disability in China
- China at the Olympics
