= Belarus at the 2014 Winter Paralympics =

- IPC code: BLR
- NPC: Paralympic Committee of the Republic of Belarus

in Sochi
- Competitors: 10 in 2 sports
- Medals Ranked 18th: Gold 0 Silver 0 Bronze 3 Total 3

Winter Paralympics appearances (overview)
- 1994; 1998; 2002; 2006; 2010; 2014; 2018; 2022; 2026

Other related appearances
- Soviet Union (1988); Unified Team (1992)

Belarus competed at the 2014 Winter Paralympics in Sochi, Russia, held between 7–16 March 2014.

== Biathlon ==
Men

Athlete	Events	Final				
Athlete	Events	Real Time	Calculated Time	Missed Shots	Result	Rank
Dzmitry Loban	7.5km, sitting	22:18.7	22:18.7	0+0	22:18.7	6
Dzmitry Loban	12.5km, sitting	37:51.7	37:51.7	0+0+0+0	37:51.7	8
Dzmitry Loban	15km, sitting	46:12.9	46:12.9	0+0+0+0	46:12.9	7
Yauheni Lukyanenka	7.5km, sitting	23:47.5	23:47.5	1+1	23:47.5	11
Yauheni Lukyanenka	15km, sitting	DNF				
Vasili Shaptsiaboi; Guide: Mikhail Lebedzeu	7.5km, visually impaired	21:32.4	21:06.6	1+0	21:06.6	3rd place, bronze medalist(s)
Vasili Shaptsiaboi; Guide: Mikhail Lebedzeu	12.5km, visually impaired	32:38.2	31:59.0	2+1+0+1	31:59.0	3rd place, bronze medalist(s)
Vasili Shaptsiaboi; Guide: Mikhail Lebedzeu	15km, visually impaired	38:16.0	40:30.1	0+1+1+1	40:30.1	6
Siarhei Silchanka	7.5km, standing	22:01.4	21:21.8	1+2	21:21.8	13
Siarhei Silchanka	12.5km, standing	34:08.7	33:07.2	1+1+1+0	33:07.2	11
Siarhei Silchanka	15km, standing	40:52.3	40:38.7	0+0+1+0	40:38.7	12

Women

Athlete	Events	Final				
Athlete	Events	Real Time	Calculated Time	Missed Shots	Result	Rank
Lidziya Hrafeyeva	6km, sitting	20:45.8	20:45.8	0+0	20:45.8	9
Lidziya Hrafeyeva	10km, sitting	36:56.5	36:56.5	0+3+0+1	36:56.5	7
Lidziya Hrafeyeva	12.5km, sitting	44:23.8	47:23.8	1+0+1+1	47:23.8	8
Yadviha Skorabahataya; Guide: Iryna Nafranovich	6km, visually impaired	23:18.9	22:50.9	0+2	22:50.9	6
Larysa Varona	6km, standing	23:39.9	22:57.3	1+0	22:57.3	12
Larysa Varona	10km, standing	DNF				
Larysa Varona	12.5km, standing	46:49.4	46:25.1	0+0+1+0	46:25.1	11

== Cross-country skiing ==
Men

Athlete	Event	Qualification			Semifinal		Final		
Athlete	Event	Real Time	Result	Rank	Result	Rank	Real Time	Result	Rank
Dzmitry Loban	1km sprint classic, sitting	2:20.60	2:20.60	13	did not qualify				
Dzmitry Loban	10km free, sitting	—N/a					33:27.8	33:27.8	11
Yauheni Lukyanenka	1km sprint classic, sitting	2:16.28	2:16.28	7Q	2:35.5	4	did not advance		
Yauheni Lukyanenka	10km free, sitting	—N/a					33:34.8	33:34.8	12
Yauheni Lukyanenka	15km, sitting	—N/a					44:19.1	44:19.1	8
Vasili Shaptsiaboi; Guide: Mikhail Lebedzeu	1km sprint classic, visually impaired	4:17.20	4:12.06	12	did not qualify				
Vasili Shaptsiaboi; Guide: Mikhail Lebedzeu	10km free, visually impaired	—N/a					25:23.3	24:52.8	5
Vasili Shaptsiaboi; Guide: Mikhail Lebedzeu	20km, visually impaired	—N/a					DNF		
Siarhei Silchanka	1km sprint classic, standing	4:15.59	4:07.92	16	did not qualify				
Siarhei Silchanka	10km free, standing	—N/a					26:37.7	25:49.8	15
Siarhei Vauchunovich	1km sprint classic, standing	4:29.13	4:18.37	23	did not qualify				
Siarhei Vauchunovich	10km free, standing	—N/a					29:04.8	27:55.0	25
Siarhei Vauchunovich	20km, standing	—N/a					1:07:36.2	1:00:50.6	11

Women

Athlete	Event	Qualification			Semifinal		Final		
Athlete	Event	Real Time	Result	Rank	Result	Rank	Real Time	Result	Rank
Lidziya Hrafeyeva	1km sprint classic, sitting	2:48.06	2:48.06	13	did not qualify				
Lidziya Hrafeyeva	5km, sitting	—N/a					19:13.0	19:13.0	17
Valiantsina Shyts	1km sprint classic, sitting	3:03.00	2:44.70	10 Q	3:00.2	4	did not advance		
Valiantsina Shyts	5km, sitting	—N/a					19:53.7	17:54.3	11
Valiantsina Shyts	12km, sitting	—N/a					47:44.3	42:57.9	11
Yadviha Skorabahataya; Guide: Iryna Nafranovich	5km, visually impaired	—N/a					14:57.6	14:39.6	5
Yadviha Skorabahataya; Guide: Iryna Nafranovich	15km, visually impaired	—N/a					56:54.8	55:46.5	3rd place, bronze medalist(s)
Larysa Varona	1km sprint classic, standing	5:41.85	5:31.59	14	did not qualify				
Larysa Varona	5km, standing	—N/a					16:32.2	16:02.4	15
Larysa Varona	15km, standing	—N/a					56:54.2	51:46.9	4
Liudmila Vauchok	1km sprint classic, sitting	2:54.64	2:44.16	9Q	3:08.3	5	did not advance		
Liudmila Vauchok	5km, sitting	—N/a					18:32.4	17:25.7	6
Liudmila Vauchok	12km, sitting	—N/a					43:32.9	40:56.1	6

Relay

Athletes	Event	Final	
Athletes	Event	Time	Rank
Yauheni Lukyanenka; Vasili Shaptsiaboi; Guide: Mikhail Lebedzeu; Yadviha Skorabahataya; Guide: Iryna Nafranovich	4 x 2.5km open relay	26:04.2	5
Siarhei Silchanka; Larysa Varona; Liudmila Vauchok	4 x 2.5km mixed relay	29:27.9	8

== See also ==
- Belarus at the Paralympics
- Belarus at the 2014 Winter Olympics
