= Disability in Belarus =

Disability in Belarus refers to the people with disability in Belarus.

== History ==
In 2016, Belarus ratified the Convention on the Rights of Persons with Disabilities. In 2017, the Government of Belarus drew up and adopted the appropriate national plan until 2025.

== Statistics ==
Currently there are around 570,000 people with disabilities in Belarus, which counts about 6% of the population.

== See also ==
- Belarus at the Paralympics
