= Belarus at the 1994 Winter Paralympics =

- IPC code: BLR
- NPC: Paralympic Committee of the Republic of Belarus

in Lillehammer
- Competitors: 2
- Medals: Gold 0 Silver 0 Bronze 0 Total 0

Winter Paralympics appearances (overview)
- 1994; 1998; 2002; 2006; 2010; 2014; 2018; 2022; 2026

Other related appearances
- Soviet Union (1988); Unified Team (1992)

Belarus competed at the 1994 Winter Paralympics in Lillehammer, Norway, which were held from 10 to 19 March 1994. This edition of the Winter Games marked the first appearance of Belarus at a Winter Paralympics and any edition of the Paralympic Games. The athlete delegation consisted of two competitors: cross-country skiers Vassili Petratchouk and Nikolai Kholkin, both classified as LW4 (disabled in at least one lower extremity).

They had competed in the men's 5 kilometres Classical Technique LW4, men's 10 kilometres Classical Technique LW4, and men's 20 kilometres Classical Technique LW4. None of them had finished in the top three, and thus did not medal.

== Background ==
The 1994 Winter Paralympics were held in Lillehammer, Norway, from 10 to 19 March 1994. This edition of the Paralympics would be the first appearance of Belarus at any edition of the Paralympic Games, with their second appearance coming in at the 1996 Summer Paralympics in Atlanta, Georgia, United States. The athlete delegation of the nation consisted of two athletes: cross-country skiers Vassili Petratchouk and Nikolai Kholkin, both classified as LW4 (disabled in at least one lower extremity).

== Cross-country skiing ==
The cross-country skiing events were held at Birkebeineren Ski Stadium. Cross-country skiers Vassili Petratchouk and Nikolai Kholkin both competed in three events: the men's 5 kilometres Classical Technique LW4, men's 10 kilometres Classical Technique LW4, and men's 20 kilometres Classical Technique LW4.

In the men's 5 kilometres Classical Technique LW4, Petratchouk had placed 10th while Kholkin had placed 13th. Then in the men's 10 kilometres Classical Technique LW4, Petratchouk had placed 8th while Kholkin had placed 7th. Finally, in the men's 20 kilometres Classical Technique LW4, Petratchouk had placed 9th while Kholkin was disqualified in the race.

Cross-country skiing summary
Athlete	Event	Final
Athlete	Event	Rank
Vassili Petratchouk	Men's 5 km Classical Technique LW4	10
Vassili Petratchouk	Men's 10 km Classical Technique LW4	8
Vassili Petratchouk	Men's 20 km Classical Technique LW4	9
Nikolai Kholkin	Men's 5 km Classical Technique LW4	13
Nikolai Kholkin	Men's 10 km Classical Technique LW4	7
Nikolai Kholkin	Men's 20 km Classical Technique LW4	DQ

== See also ==
- Belarus at the Paralympics
- Belarus at the 1994 Winter Olympics
