= Belarus at the 2002 Winter Paralympics =

- IPC code: BLR
- NPC: Paralympic Committee of the Republic of Belarus

in Salt Lake City
- Competitors: 4
- Medals Ranked 16th: Gold 1 Silver 1 Bronze 0 Total 2

Winter Paralympics appearances (overview)
- 1994; 1998; 2002; 2006; 2010; 2014; 2018; 2022; 2026

Other related appearances
- Soviet Union (1988); Unified Team (1992)

Belarus competed at the 2002 Winter Paralympics in Salt Lake City, United States. 4 competitors from Belarus won 2 medals, 1 gold and 1 silver, and finished 16th in the medal table.

== See also ==
- Belarus at the Paralympics
- Belarus at the 2002 Winter Olympics
