= Volodymyr Piddubnyy =

Ukrainian Paralympic athlete

Medal record

Paralympic athletics

Representing Ukraine

Paralympic Games
Bronze medal – third place	2004 Athens	Shot Put - F11

Volodymyr Piddubnyy, (Ukrainian:Володимир Піддубний), is a Paralympian athlete from Ukraine competing mainly in category F11 shot put and discus throw events.

Volodymyr first competed in the 2000 Summer Paralympics in both the shot put and discus throw without winning any medals. In 2004 he concentrated in the shot put and won a bronze medal. He switched for the 2008 Summer Paralympics but was unable to win a medal in the discus.
