= Belarus at the 1998 Winter Paralympics =

- IPC code: BLR
- NPC: Paralympic Committee of the Republic of Belarus

in Nagano
- Competitors: 5
- Medals: Gold 0 Silver 0 Bronze 0 Total 0

Winter Paralympics appearances (overview)
- 1994; 1998; 2002; 2006; 2010; 2014; 2018; 2022; 2026

Other related appearances
- Soviet Union (1988); Unified Team (1992)

Belarus competed at the 1998 Winter Paralympics in Nagano, Japan. 5 competitors from Belarus won no medals and so did not place in the medal table.

== See also ==
- Belarus at the Paralympics
- Belarus at the 1998 Winter Olympics
