= David Casinos =

Spanish Paralympic athlete (born 1972)

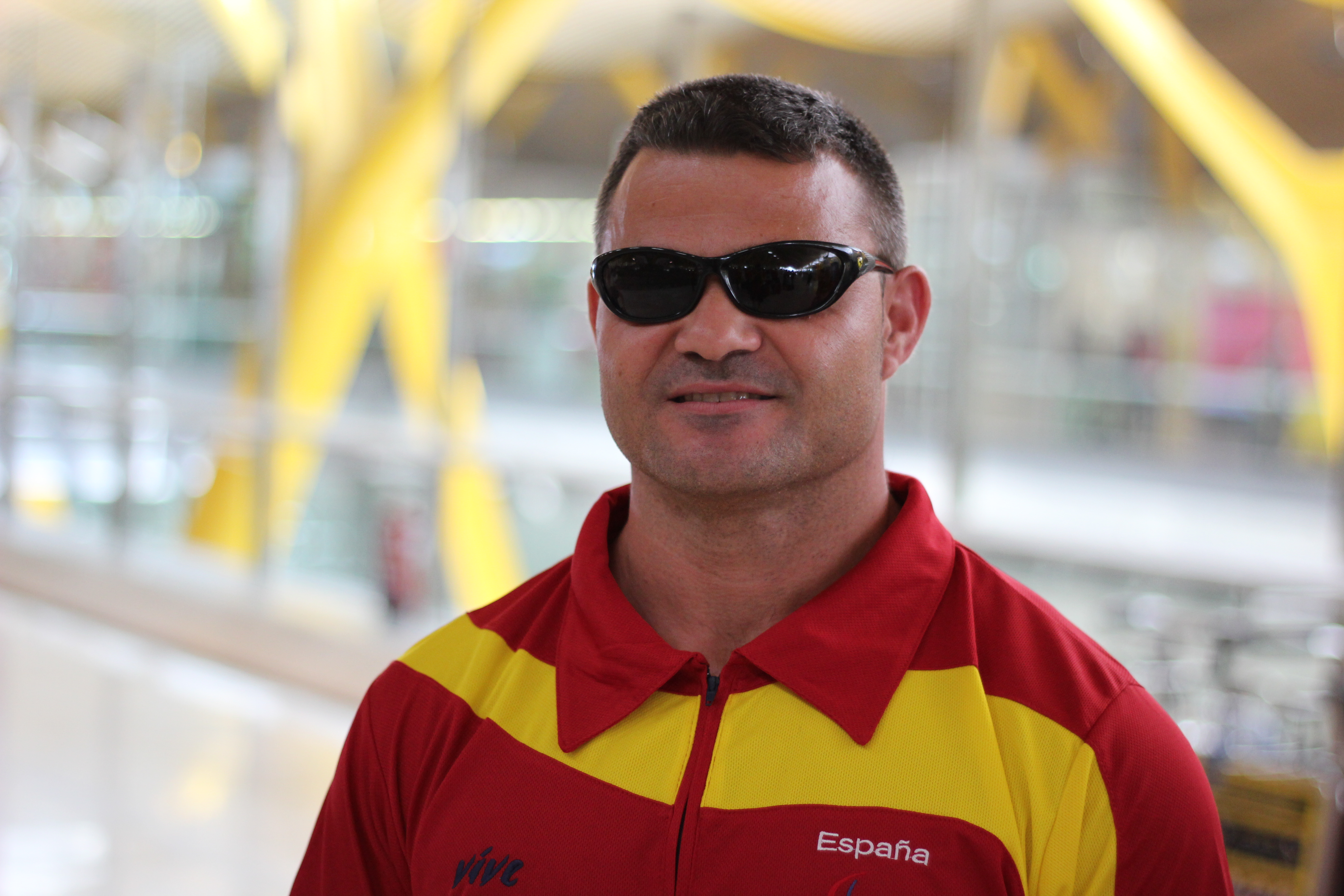
- Casinos in 2013

Personal information
- Full name: David Casinos Sierra
- Nationality: Spanish
- Born: 15 February 1972 (age 54) Valencia, Spain

Sport
- Country: Spain
- Sport: Track and field (F11)
Medal record
Paralympic athletics
Representing Spain
Paralympic Games
Gold medal – first place	2000 Sydney	Shot put – F11
Gold medal – first place	2004 Athens	Shot put – F11
Gold medal – first place	2008 Beijing	Shot put - F11/12
Gold medal – first place	2012 London	Discus Throw - F11
Bronze medal – third place	2016 Rio de Janeiro	Discus Throw - F11
IPC World Championships
Gold medal – first place	2013 Lyon	Discus - F11
Gold medal – first place	2015 Doha	Discus - F11
IPC European Championships
Gold medal – first place	2014 Swansea	Discus - F11
Silver medal – second place	2016 Grosseto	Discus - F11

David Casinos Sierra (Note: In this Spanish name, the first or paternal surname is Casinos and the second or maternal family name is Sierra.) (born 15 February 1972 in Valencia) is a Spanish Paralympian, and four-time gold medalist in the shot put and discus.

== Athletics ==
Casinos is a four-time Paralympic gold medalist in the shot put, and won the F11 class in 2000 and 2004 and the combined F11/12 class in 2008. He also competed in the discus in 2000, 2004 and 2008 Paralympics. He competed at the 2012 Summer Paralympics where he finished first in the discus and fifth in the shot put.

In 2002, Casinos competed in the Valencia Athletics Open, which was organized by the Federació d'Esports Adaptats de la Comunitat Valenciana (FESA). He qualified for and competed in the 2011 IPC Athletics World Championships where he was one of thirty-two competitors representing Spain.

He also competed in the 2012 Spanish national championships held in the Basque country, where he set a Paralympic B qualifying standard in the shot put with a distance of 13.10 meters.

In 2012, he was a recipient of a Plan ADO €23,000 athlete scholarship with a €3,000 reserve and a €2,500 coaching scholarship. His ability to compete at the highest level was also made possible because of sponsorships from groups like Council of the City of Valencia and Moncada.

In May 2013, Casinos competed in the Spanish national championships, where he earned a gold medal in the shot put and another in the discus.

Prior to the start of the London Games, he trained with several other visually impaired Spanish track and field athletes in Logroño.

In July 2013, he participated in the 2013 IPC Athletics World Championships.

He was the flag bearer for the Spanish team at the 2008 Games.

== Personal life ==
Cella Maestre became a guide for Casinos for the 2004 Summer Paralympics. At the time, they were dating and broke Paralympic taboo by sharing a room together in the Paralympic village. Maestre was also a guide for Casinos at the 2008 Summer Paralympics in athletics, where they won a gold medal.

=== Results ===
Year	Sporting event	Location	Sport type	Finish	Score	Note
2000	Paralympic Games	AUS Sydney	Shot put F11	Gold Medal	15,26 m	
2002	World Championships	FRA Lille	Shot put F11	Gold Medal	14,56 m	
2004	Paralympic Games	GRE Athens	Shot put F11	Gold Medal	14,01 m	
2006	World Championships	NED Assen	Shot put F11	Gold Medal	13,84 m	
2006	World Championships	NED Assen	Discus F11	Gold Medal	41,27 m	
2008	Paralympic Games	CHN Beijing	Shot put F11- F12	Gold Medal	14,50 m	
2011	World Championship	NZL Christchurch	Shot put F11	Gold Medal	12,93 m	
2011	World Championship	NZL Christchurch	Discus F11	Gold Medal	40,89 m	
