= Ihor Reptyukh =

Ukrainian Para cross-country skier and biathlete (born 1994)

Personal information
- Nationality: Ukrainian
- Born: 18 June 1994 (age 32) Chernihiv, Ukraine

Sport
- Country: Ukraine
- Sport: Para Nordic skiing (Para cross-country skiing and Para biathlon)
- Disability class: LW6/8
Medal record
Representing Ukraine
Winter Paralympics
Men's Para cross-country skiing
Gold medal – first place	2018 Pyeongchang	20km free standing
Silver medal – second place	2014 Sochi	4 x 2.5 km relay open
Men's Para biathlon
Silver medal – second place	2018 Pyeongchang	12.5km standing
Bronze medal – third place	2018 Pyeongchang	7.5km standing

Ihor Reptyukh (born 18 June 1994) is a Ukrainian male Para cross-country skier and biathlete. He has represented Ukraine at the Paralympics in 2014 and 2018 claiming 4 medals in his Paralympic career including a gold medal which he claimed during the 2018 Winter Paralympics.

== Career ==
Ihor Reptyukh made his Paralympic debut during the 2014 Winter Paralympics and claimed a solitary silver medal in the 4 x 2.5 km relay open event.

Ihor claimed his first Paralympic gold medal during the 2018 Winter Paralympics after clinching a gold medal in the 20km free standing event. He also achieved his first Paralympic medal for biathlon in his career, after claiming a bronze medal in the men's 7.5km standing event and followed it up with a silver medal in the men's 12.5km standing event.
