= Siarhei Hrybanau =

Belarusian Paralympic athlete

Medal record

Paralympic athletics

Representing Belarus

Paralympic Games
Bronze medal – third place	2004 Athens	Discus Throw - F13

Siarhei Hrybanau (Belarusian: Сяргей Грыбанаў) is a paralympic athlete from Belarus competing mainly in category F12 shot put and discus events.

Siarhei competed in the shot and discus in both the 2004 and 2008 Summer Paralympics winning a bronze medal in the F13 discus in the 2004 games.
