= Willibald Monschein =

Austrian Paralympic athlete

Medal record

Paralympic athletics

Representing Austria

Paralympic Games
Silver medal – second place	2004 Athens	Shot Put - F11
Bronze medal – third place	2000 Sydney	Shot Put - F11
Bronze medal – third place	2000 Sydney	Discus Throw - F11

Willibald Monschein is a paralympic athlete from Austria competing mainly in category F11 shot and discus events.

Williald competed in both the shot and discus in both the 2000 and 2004 Summer Paralympics. He won bronze medals in both events in 2000 and a silver in the shot put in 2004.
