= Dzmitry Loban =

Belarusian Para cross-country skier and biathlete (born 1981)

Personal information
- Nationality: Belarusian
- Born: May 3, 1981 (age 45)
- Spouse: Lidziya Hrafeyeva

Sport
- Country: Belarus
- Sport: Para Nordic skiing (Para cross-country skiing and Para biathlon)
- Disability class: LW12
Medal record
Representing Belarus
Winter Paralympics
Men's Para biathlon
Silver medal – second place	Pyeongchang 2018	7.5km sitting
Men's Para cross-country skiing
Silver medal – second place	Pyeongchang 2018	1.5km sprint classic sitting
Bronze medal – third place	Vancouver 2010	10km classic sitting

Dzmitry Loban (born 3 May 1981) is a Belarusian male Para cross-country skier and biathlete. He has competed at the Winter Paralympics in 2010, 2014 and 2018 claiming 2 medals in his Paralympic career.

== Career ==
Dzmitry made his Paralympic debut during the 2010 Winter Paralympics and managed to claim a solitary bronze medal in the men's 10km cross-country skiing event. He went on to represent Belarus at the 2014 Winter Paralympics and went medalless during the competition. He was also selected to compete at the 2018 Winter Paralympics, his third Paralympic event. Dzmitry clinched a silver medal in the men's 7.5km sitting biathlon event as a part of the 2018 Winter Paralympics.

Coincidentally Dzmitry's wife, Lidziya Hrafeyeva also represented Belarus at the 2018 Winter Paralympics.

== Biography ==
Dzmitry Loban was affected in a train accident at the age of 22 as he lost both of his legs above the knee which prompted him to take the sport of Para Nordic skiing in 2007.

He married fellow Belarusian Para Nordic skier, Lidziya Hrafeyeva who subsequently made her Paralympic debut during the 2018 Winter Paralympics.
