= Maksym Yarovyi =

Ukrainian cross-country skier and biathlete

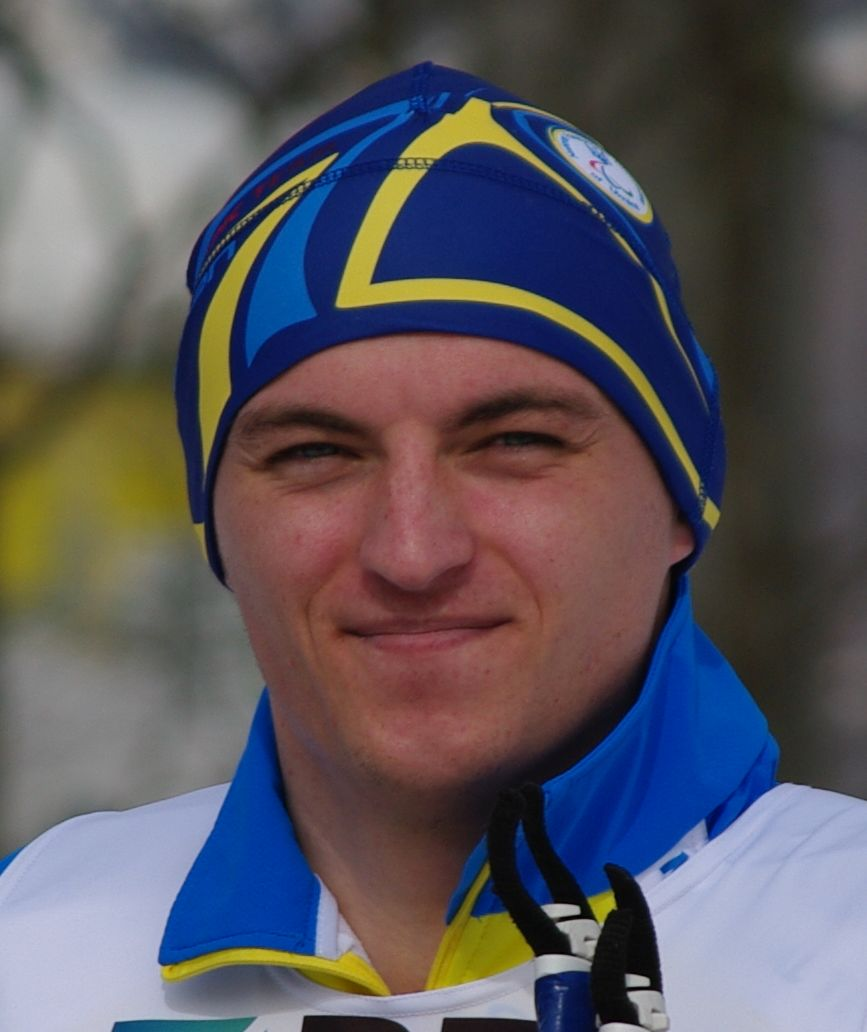

Personal information
- Born: October 3, 1989 (age 36)

Sport
- Sport: Skiing
Medal record
Men's biathlon
Representing Ukraine
Paralympic Games
Silver medal – second place	2014 Sochi	7.5 km, sitting

Maksym Volodymyrovych Yarovyi (Ukrainian: Максим Володимирович Яровий; born 3 October 1989) is a Ukrainian cross-country skier, biathlete, and Paralympian. He competes in classification category sitting events.

== Early life ==
Maksym Yarovyi was born on October 3, 1989. His disability came from an accident. He began competing in 1997.

== Career ==
He was awarded Master of Sports of Ukraine in winter sports for persons with disabilities. He earned a bronze medal in the long biathlon in Vuokatti, Finland. At competitions in Vuokatti in January 2014 he won first place in cross-country skiing (short distance) and second in cross-country skiing (middle distance). At the Winter Paralympics in Sochi he won the silver medal in biathlon, as well as silver and bronze medals in ski racing. He participated at the 2022 Winter Paralympics.
