= Sun Haitao =

Chinese Paralympic athlete

Medal record

Track and field (athletics)

Representing China

Paralympic Games
Gold medal – first place	1996 Atlanta	Discus Throw - F12
Gold medal – first place	1996 Atlanta	Javelin Throw - F12
Gold medal – first place	1996 Atlanta	Shot Put - F12
Gold medal – first place	2000 Sydney	Shot Put - F13
Gold medal – first place	2004 Athens	Discus Throw - F12
Gold medal – first place	2004 Athens	Javelin Throw - F13
Silver medal – second place	2000 Sydney	Discus Throw - F13
Bronze medal – third place	2000 Sydney	Javelin Throw - F13

Sun Hai Tao is a paralympic athlete from China competing mainly in category F12 throws events.

Sun Hai Tao is a six time gold medalist at the Paralympics, winning gold medals at each of his three paralympics. He first competed in the 1996 Summer Paralympics with a clean sweep of gold medals in the F12 throws events with wins in discus, javelin and shot as well as competing as part of the Chinese 4 × 100 m relay team. He returned in 2000 Summer Paralympics but was not as successful only managing to retain the shot put gold medal while winning silver in the discus and bronze in the shot put. But he managed to come back stronger in the 2004 Summer Paralympics winning gold in the discus and shot put but for the first time in an individual event he missed out on a medal in the javelin.
