= Laura Biathlon & Ski Complex =

Skiing venue in Russia

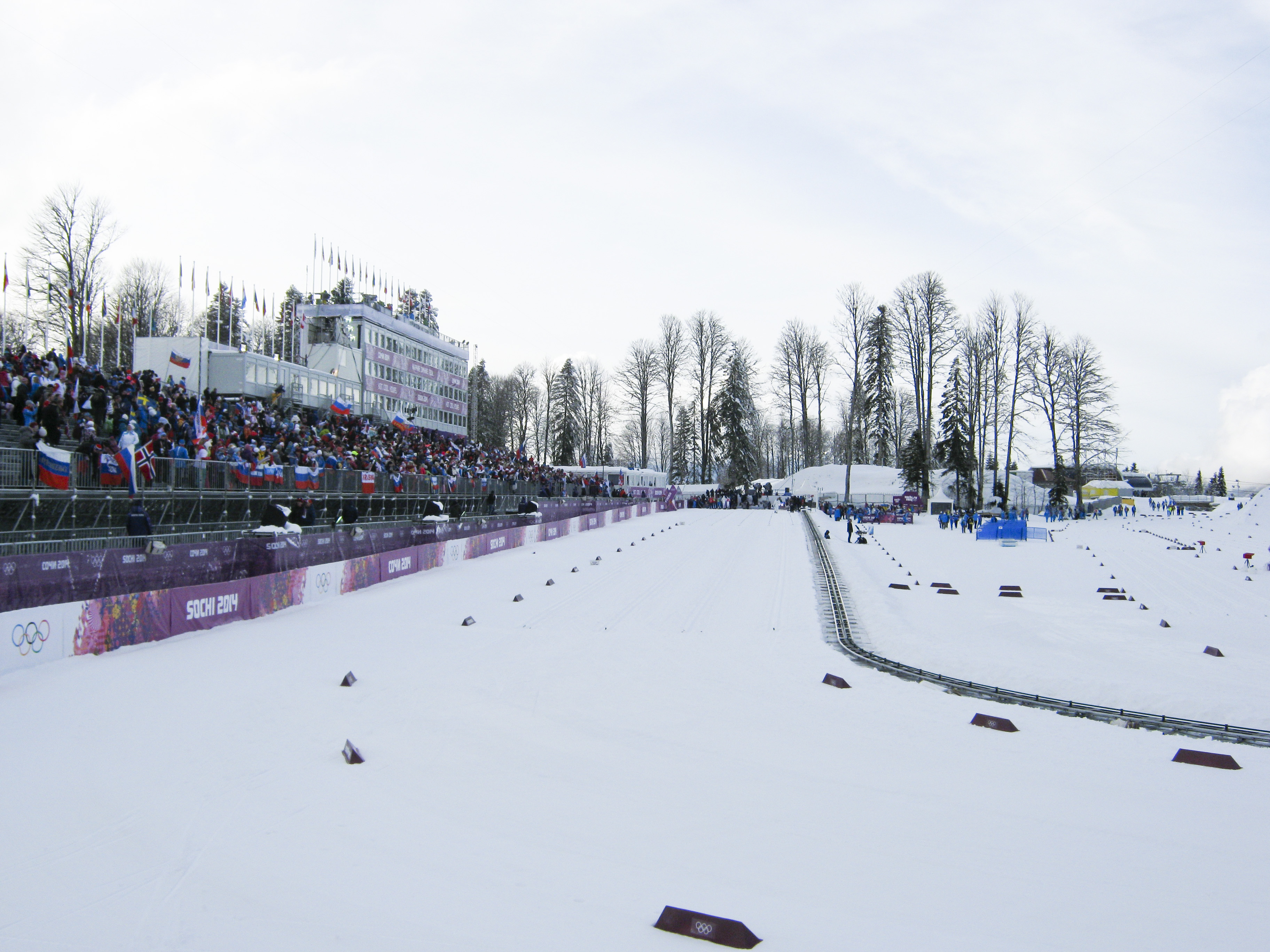
- Interactive map of Laura Biathlon & Ski Complex
- Location: Sochi, Russia
- Coordinates: 43°41′33″N 40°19′31″E
- Capacity: 7,500 Olympic Mode

Construction
- Opened: 2013

Tenants
- 2014 Winter Olympics (cross-country skiing and biathlon); 2014 Winter Paralympics (cross-country skiing and biathlon)

The Laura Biathlon & Ski Complex (Russian: Лыжно-биатлонный комплекс «Лаура») is a skiing venue located on the crests and slopes of Psekhako Ridge in Krasnaya Polyana, Russia. For the 2014 Winter Olympics and Paralympics in neighboring Sochi, it hosted the biathlon and cross-country skiing events, as well as the respective portions of the Nordic combined events.

Having a capacity of 7,500 at both the biathlon and cross-country skiing areas, it was first used in June 2013.
