= Yadviha Skorabahataya =

Belarusian Paralympic skier (born 1968)

Personal information
- Nationality: Belarus
- Born: 10 June 1968 (age 58)

Sport
- Sport: Skiing
Medal record
Paralympic Games

Yadviha Skorabahataya (born 10 June 1968) is a Belarusian visually impaired Paralympic skier.

She participated at the 2002 Winter Paralympics, 2006 Winter Paralympics, 2010 Winter Paralympics, 2014 Winter Paralympics, 2018 Winter Paralympics.

== See also ==
- Cross-country skiing at the 2002 Winter Paralympics
- Cross-country skiing at the 2006 Winter Paralympics
- Cross-country skiing at the 2010 Winter Paralympics
- Cross-country skiing at the 2014 Winter Paralympics
- Cross-country skiing at the 2018 Winter Paralympics
