= Liudmila Vauchok =

Belarusian Paralympian (born 1981)

Personal information
- Born: 19 June 1981 (age 45) Smilavičy, Byelorussian SSR, Soviet Union (now Belarus)
Medal record
Representing Belarus
Women's para cross-country skiing
Winter Paralympic Games
Gold medal – first place	2006 Turin	10 km
Gold medal – first place	2010 Vancouver	10 km
Silver medal – second place	2006 Turin	2.5 km
Silver medal – second place	2006 Turin	5 km
Silver medal – second place	2006 Turin	3 × 2.5 km relay
Women's para rowing
Summer Paralympic Games
Silver medal – second place	2008 Beijing	Single sculls
Bronze medal – third place	2012 London	Single sculls

Liudmila Anatoleuna Vauchok (Belarusian: Людміла Анатолеўна Ваўчок, Russian: Людмила Анатольевна Волчок, born 19 June 1981) is a Belarusian Paralympian. She competed at the 2008 Summer Paralympics, winning a silver medal, and at the 2012 Summer Paralympics, winning a bronze medal. She qualified for the 2020 Summer Paralympics.

== Career ==
She had excelled in athletics and she had won the Belarusian national titles in runs between 1500 and 5000 meters distances before she injured her spine in 2001 and was forced to use a wheelchair. She stayed involved in sports after her injury winning podium finishes in national competitions in armwrestling, athletics and dance. She dominated especially in cross-country skiing.

Vauchok participated in the 2006 Winter Paralympics in Turin winning 10-kilometer skiing race and adding three bronzes.

In 2007, she finished second in the rowing world championships in Munich-Oberschleißheim in the women's single sculls Paralympic event.

Rowing was included into the 2008 Summer Paralympics program and Vauchok won silver medal in the women's single sculls event, the first ever Paralympic rowing final. She won a bronze medal in the 2012 Summer Paralympics.
