= List of 2010 Winter Paralympics medal winners =

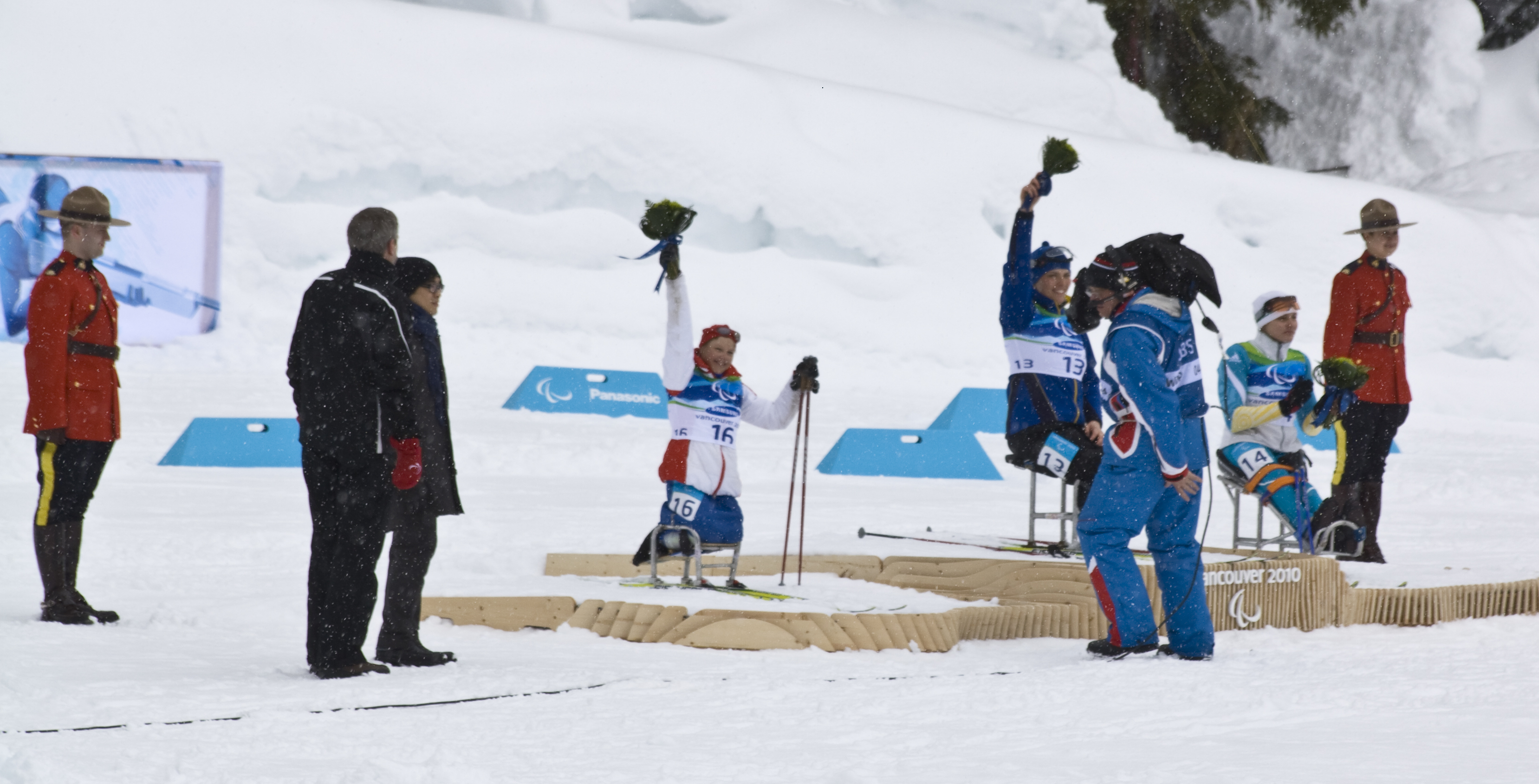
Women's 2.4km Pursuit Sitting Biathlon flower ceremony. Olena Iurkovska of Ukraine (gold), Maria Iovleva of Russia (silver), Lyudmyla Pavlenko of Ukraine (bronze).

The 2010 Winter Paralympics were held in Vancouver, British Columbia, Canada, from March 12 to March 21, 2010. A total 506 athletes from 44 National Paralympic Committees (NPCs) participated in these Games. Overall, 64 events in 5 disciplines were contested.

Canada finished third overall in gold medal wins, with 10 gold medals. Russia placed first in total medals, with 38.

== Alpine skiing ==
Event	Class	Gold	Silver	Bronze
Women's downhill	visually impaired	Viviane Forest; Guide: Lindsay Debou; Canada	Henrieta Farkasova; Guide: Natalia Subrtova; Slovakia	Danelle Umstead; Guide: Rob Umstead; United States
Women's downhill	sitting	Alana Nichols; United States	Laurie Stephens; United States	Claudia Lösch; Austria
Women's downhill	standing	Lauren Woolstencroft; Canada	Solène Jambaqué; France	Andrea Rothfuß; Germany
Women's Super-G	visually impaired	Henrieta Farkasova; Guide: Natalia Subrtova; Slovakia	Viviane Forest; Guide: Lindsay Debou; Canada	Anna Kuliskova; Guide: Michaela Hubacova; Czech Republic
Women's Super-G	sitting	Claudia Lösch; Austria	Alana Nichols; United States	Anna Schaffelhuber; Germany
Women's Super-G	standing	Lauren Woolstencroft; Canada	Melania Corradini; Italy	Andrea Rothfuß; Germany
Women's giant slalom	visually impaired	Henrieta Farkasova; Guide: Natalia Subrtova; Slovakia	Sabine Gasteiger; Guide: Stefan Schoner; Austria	Viviane Forest; Guide: Lindsay Debou; Canada
Women's giant slalom	sitting	Alana Nichols; United States	Stephani Victor; United States	Kuniko Obinata; Japan
Women's giant slalom	standing	Lauren Woolstencroft; Canada	Andrea Rothfuß; Germany	Petra Smarzova; Slovakia
Women's slalom	visually impaired	Sabine Gasteiger; Guide: Stefan Schoner; Austria	Viviane Forest; Guide: Lindsay Debou; Canada	Jessica Gallagher; Guide: Eric Bickerton; Australia
Women's slalom	sitting	Claudia Lösch; Austria	Stephani Victor; United States	Kuniko Obinata; Japan
Women's slalom	standing	Lauren Woolstencroft; Canada	Andrea Rothfuß; Germany	Karolina Wisniewska; Canada
Women's Super Combined	visually impaired	Henrieta Farkasova; Guide: Natalia Subrtova; Slovakia	Viviane Forest; Guide: Lindsay Debou; Canada	Danelle Umstead; Guide: Rob Umstead; United States
Women's Super Combined	sitting	Stephani Victor; United States	Claudia Lösch; Austria	Alana Nichols; United States
Women's Super Combined	standing	Lauren Woolstencroft; Canada	Solène Jambaqué; France	Karolina Wisniewska; Canada
Men's downhill	visually impaired	Jon Santacana Maiztegui; Guide: Miguel Galindo Garces; Spain	Mark Bathum; Guide: Slater Storey; United States	Gerd Gradwohl; Guide: Karl-Heinz Vachenauer; Germany
Men's downhill	sitting	Christoph Kunz; Switzerland	Taiki Morii; Japan	Akira Kano; Japan
Men's downhill	standing	Gerd Schönfelder; Germany	Marty Mayberry; Australia; Michael Brugger; Switzerland	
Men's Super-G	visually impaired	Nicolas Berejny; Guide: Sophie Troc; France	Jakub Krako; Guide: Juraj Medera; Slovakia	Miroslav Haraus; Guide: Martin Makovnik; Slovakia
Men's Super-G	sitting	Akira Kano; Japan	Martin Braxenthaler; Germany	Taiki Morii; Japan
Men's Super-G	standing	Gerd Schönfelder; Germany	Vincent Gauthier-Manuel; France	Hubert Mandl; Austria
Men's giant slalom	visually impaired	Jakub Krako; Guide: Juraj Medera; Slovakia	Jon Santacana Maiztegui; Guide: Miguel Galindo Garces; Spain	Gianmaria dal Maistro; Guide: Tommaso Balasso; Italy
Men's giant slalom	sitting	Martin Braxenthaler; Germany	Christoph Kunz; Switzerland	Takeshi Suzuki; Japan
Men's giant slalom	standing	Gerd Schönfelder; Germany	Robert Meusburger; Austria	Vincent Gauthier-Manuel; France
Men's slalom	visually impaired	Jakub Krako; Guide: Juraj Medera; Slovakia	Jon Santacana Maiztegui; Guide: Miguel Galindo Garces; Spain	Gianmaria dal Maistro; Guide: Tommaso Balasso; Italy
Men's slalom	sitting	Martin Braxenthaler; Germany	John Dueck; Canada	Philipp Bonadimann; Austria
Men's slalom	standing	Adam Hall; New Zealand	Gerd Schönfelder; Germany	Cameron Rahles-Rahbula; Australia
Men's Super Combined	visually impaired	Jakub Krako; Guide: Juraj Medera; Slovakia	Gianmaria dal Maistro; Guide: Tommaso Balasso; Italy	Miroslav Haraus; Guide: Martin Makovnik; Slovakia
Men's Super Combined	sitting	Martin Braxenthaler; Germany	Jürgen Egle; Austria	Philipp Bonadimann; Austria
Men's Super Combined	standing	Gerd Schönfelder; Germany	Vincent Gauthier-Manuel; France	Cameron Rahles-Rahbula; Australia

== Biathlon ==
Event	Class	Gold	Silver	Bronze
Women's Pursuit	visually impaired	Verena Bentele; Guide: Thomas Friedrich; Germany	Lioubov Vasilieva; Guide: Natalia Yakimova; Russia	Mikhalina Lysova; Guide: Alexey Ivanov; Russia
Women's Pursuit	sitting	Olena Iurkovska; Ukraine	Maria Iovleva; Russia	Lyudmyla Pavlenko; Ukraine
Women's Pursuit	standing	Anna Burmistrova; Russia	Maija Loytynoja; Finland	Alena Gorbunova; Russia
Women's Individual	visually impaired	Verena Bentele; Guide: Thomas Friedrich; Germany	Lioubov Vasilieva; Guide: Natalia Yakimova; Russia	Mikhalina Lysova; Guide: Alexey Ivanov; Russia
Women's Individual	sitting	Maria Iovleva; Russia	Olena Iurkovska; Ukraine	Andrea Eskau; Germany
Women's Individual	standing	Oleksandra Kononova; Ukraine	Anna Burmistrova; Russia	Iuliia Batenkova; Ukraine
Men's Pursuit	visually impaired	Vitaliy Lukyanenko; Guide: Volodymyr Ivanov; Ukraine	Nikolay Polukhin; Guide: Andrey Tokarev; Russia	Vasili Shaptsiaboi; Guide: Mikalai Shablouski; Belarus
Men's Pursuit	sitting	Irek Zaripov; Russia	Iurii Kostiuk; Ukraine	Andy Soule; United States
Men's Pursuit	standing	Kirill Mikhaylov; Russia	Nils-Erik Ulset; Norway	Grygorii Vovchinskiy; Ukraine
Men's Individual	visually impaired	Wilhelm Brem; Guide: Florian Grimm; Germany	Nikolay Polukhin; Guide: Andrey Tokarev; Russia	Vitaliy Lukyanenko; Guide: Volodymyr Ivanov; Ukraine
Men's Individual	sitting	Irek Zaripov; Russia	Vladimir Kiselev; Russia	Roman Petushkov; Russia
Men's Individual	standing	Nils-Erik Ulset; Norway	Grygorii Vovchinskiy; Ukraine	Josef Giesen; Germany

== Cross-country skiing ==
Event	Class	Gold	Silver	Bronze
Women's 1 km Sprint Classic	visually impaired	Verena Bentele; Guide: Thomas Friedrich; Germany	Mikhalina Lysova; Guide: Alexey Ivanov; Russia	Liubov Vasilyeva; Guide: Natalia Yakimova; Russia
Women's 1 km Sprint Classic	sitting	Francesca Porcellato; Italy	Olena Iurkovska; Ukraine	Liudmila Vauchok; Belarus
Women's 1 km Sprint Classic	standing	Oleksandra Kononova; Ukraine	Shoko Ota; Japan	Anna Burmistrova; Russia
Women's 5 km Classic	visually impaired	Verena Bentele; Guide: Thomas Friedrich; Germany	Mikhalina Lysova; Guide: Alexey Ivanov; Russia	Tatiana Ilyuchenko; Guide: Valery Koshkin; Russia
Women's 5 km Classic	sitting	Liudmila Vauchok; Belarus	Andrea Eskau; Germany	Colette Bourgonje; Canada
Women's 5 km Classic	standing	Oleksandra Kononova; Ukraine	Iuliia Batenkova; Ukraine	Larysa Varona; Belarus
Women's 10 km	sitting	Liudmila Vauchok; Belarus	Colette Bourgonje; Canada	Olena Iurkovska; Ukraine
Women's 15 km Free	visually impaired	Verena Bentele; Guide: Thomas Friedrich; Germany	Liubov Vasilyeva; Guide: Natalia Yakimova; Russia	Yadviha Skorabahataya; Guide: Vasili Haurukovich; Belarus
Women's 15 km Free	standing	Anna Burmistrova; Russia	Iuliia Batenkova; Ukraine	Katarzyna Rogowiec; Poland
Women's 3 x 2.5 km Relay		Russia (RUS); Maria Iovleva; Mikhalina Lysova; Guide: Alexey Ivanov; Liubov Vasilyeva; Guide: Natalia Yakimova	Ukraine (UKR); Olena Iurkovska; Iuliia Batenkova; Oleksandra Kononova	Belarus (BLR); Larysa Varona; Liudmila Vauchok; Yadviha Skorabahataya; Guide: Vasili Haurukovich
Men's 1 km Sprint Classic	visually impaired	Brian McKeever; Guide: Robin McKeever; Canada	Nikolay Polukhin; Guide: Andrey Tokarev; Russia	Zebastian Modin; Guide: Albin Ackerot; Sweden
Men's 1 km Sprint Classic	sitting	Sergey Shilov; Russia	Irek Zaripov; Russia	Vladimir Kiselev; Russia
Men's 1 km Sprint Classic	standing	Yoshihiro Nitta; Japan	Kirill Mikhaylov; Russia	Ilkka Tuomisto; Finland
Men's 10 km Classic	visually impaired	Brian McKeever; Guide: Robin McKeever; Canada	Helge Flo; Guide: Thomas Losnegard; Norway	Nikolay Polukhin; Guide: Andrey Tokarev; Russia
Men's 10 km Classic	sitting	Irek Zaripov; Russia	Enzo Masiello; Italy	Dzmitry Loban; Belarus
Men's 10 km Classic	standing	Yoshihiro Nitta; Japan	Kirill Mikhaylov; Russia	Grygorii Vovchinskiy; Ukraine
Men's 15 km	sitting	Irek Zaripov; Russia	Roman Petushkov; Russia	Enzo Masiello; Italy
Men's 20 km Free	visually impaired	Brian McKeever; Guide: Robin McKeever; Canada	Nikolay Polukhin; Guide: Andrey Tokarev; Russia	Vasili Shaptsiaboi; Guide: Mikalai Shablouski; Belarus
Men's 20 km Free	standing	Kirill Mikhaylov; Russia	Nils-Erik Ulset; Norway	Vladimir Kononov; Russia
Men's 1 x 4 km + 2 x 5 km Relay		Russia (RUS); Sergey Shilov; Kirill Mikhaylov; Nikolay Polukhin; Guide: Andrey Tokarev	Ukraine (UKR); Iurii Kostiuk; Grygorii Vovchinskyi; Vitaliy Lukyanenko; Guide: Volodymyr Ivanov	Norway (NOR); Trygve Toskedal Larsen; Vegard Dahle; Nils-Erik Ulset

== Wheelchair curling ==
Games	Gold	Silver	Bronze
Mixed	Canada (CAN); Jim Armstrong; Darryl Neighbour; Ina Forrest; Sonja Gaudet; Bruno Yizek	South Korea (KOR); Kim Hak-sung; Kim Myung-jin; Cho Yang-hyun; Kang Mi-suk; Park Gil-woo	Sweden (SWE); Jalle Jungnell; Glenn Ikonen*; Patrik Burman; Anette Wilhelm; Patrik Kallin

* suspended

== Ice sledge hockey ==
Event	Gold	Silver	Bronze
Team	United States (USA)	Japan (JPN)	Norway (NOR)
Team	Mike Blabac; Steve Cash; Taylor Chace; Jimmy Connelly; Brad Emmerson; Joe Howard; Tim Jones; Nikko Landeros; Taylor Lipsett; Adam Page; Josh Pauls; Alexi Salamone; Greg Shaw; Bubba Torres; Andy Yohe	Mikio Annaka; Takayuki Endo; Shinobu Fukushima; Naohiko Ishida; Noritaka Ito; Makoto Majima; Tomohiko Maruo; Eiji Misawa; Mitsuru Nagase; Toshiyuki Nakamura; Satoru Sudo; Kazuhiro Takahashi; Daisuke Uehara; Atsuya Yaguchi; Mamoru Yoshikawa	Ole Bjarte Austevoll; Audun Bakke; Helge Bjornstad; Kissinger Deng; Eskil Hagen; Thomas Jacobsen; Loyd Remi Johansen; Roger Johansen; Knut Andre Nordstoga; Rolf Einar Pedersen; Tommy Rovelstad; Kjell Vidar Royne; Stig Tore Svee; Morten Vaernes

== Medal leaders ==
Athletes that won at least two gold medals or at least three total medals are listed below.

Athlete	Nation	Sport	Gold	Silver	Bronze	Total
Nikolay Polukhin Guide: Andrey Tokarev	Russia (RUS)	Biathlon / Cross-country skiing	1	4	1	6
Lauren Woolstencroft	Canada (CAN)	Alpine skiing	5	0	0	5
Verena Bentele Guide: Thomas Friedrich	Germany (GER)	Biathlon / Cross-country skiing	5	0	0	5
Gerd Schönfelder	Germany (GER)	Alpine skiing	4	1	0	5
Irek Zaripov	Russia (RUS)	Biathlon / Cross-country skiing	4	1	0	5
Kirill Mikhaylov	Russia (RUS)	Biathlon / Cross-country skiing	3	2	0	5
Viviane Forest Guide: Lindsay Debou	Canada (CAN)	Alpine skiing	1	3	1	5
Liubov Vasilyeva Guide: Natalia Yakimova	Russia (RUS)	Biathlon / Cross-country skiing	1	3	1	5
Olena Iurkovska	Ukraine (UKR)	Biathlon / Cross-country skiing	1	3	1	5
Mikhalina Lysova Guide: Alexey Ivanov	Russia (RUS)	Biathlon / Cross-country skiing	1	2	2	5
Jakub Krako Guide: Juraj Medera	Slovakia (SVK)	Alpine skiing	3	1	0	4
Martin Braxenthaler	Germany (GER)	Alpine skiing	3	1	0	4
Henrieta Farkasova Guide: Natalia Subrtova	Slovakia (SVK)	Alpine skiing	3	1	0	4
Oleksandra Kononova	Ukraine (UKR)	Biathlon / Cross-country skiing	3	1	0	4
Alana Nichols	United States (USA)	Alpine skiing	2	1	1	4
Claudia Lösch	Austria (AUT)	Alpine skiing	2	1	1	4
Anna Burmistrova	Russia (RUS)	Biathlon / Cross-country skiing	2	1	1	4
Liudmila Vauchok	Belarus (BLR)	Cross-country skiing	2	0	2	4
Nils-Erik Ulset	Norway (NOR)	Biathlon / Cross-country skiing	1	2	1	4
Iuliia Batenkova	Ukraine (UKR)	Biathlon / Cross-country skiing	0	3	1	4
Andrea Rothfuß	Germany (GER)	Alpine skiing	0	2	2	4
Brian McKeever Guide: Robin McKeever	Canada (CAN)	Cross-country skiing	3	0	0	3
Maria Iovleva	Russia (RUS)	Biathlon / Cross-country skiing	2	1	0	3
Stephani Victor	United States (USA)	Alpine skiing	1	2	0	3
Jon Santacana Maiztegui Guide: Miguel Galindo Garces	Spain (ESP)	Alpine skiing	1	2	0	3
Vitaliy Lukyanenko Guide: Volodymyr Ivanov	Ukraine (UKR)	Biathlon / Cross-country skiing	1	1	1	3
Vincent Gauthier-Manuel	France (FRA)	Alpine skiing	0	2	1	3
Gianmaria dal Maistro Guide: Tommaso Balasso	Italy (ITA)	Alpine skiing	0	1	2	3
Grygorii Vovchinskiy	Ukraine (UKR)	Biathlon / Cross-country skiing	0	1	2	3

== See also ==
- List of 2010 Winter Olympics medal winners
