= 2008 IPC Ice Sledge Hockey World Championships =

Tournament details
- Host country: United States
- Venue: 1 (in 1 host city)
- Dates: March 29 – April 5, 2008
- Teams: 10

Final positions
- Champions: Canada (2nd title)

Tournament statistics
- Games played: 26
- Goals scored: 147 (5.65 per game)
- Scoring leader: (Canada) Billy Bridges (15 points)

Awards
- MVP: (Canada) Bradley Bowden (Forward) (Canada) Adam Dixon (Defence) (Norway) Roger Johansen (Goal)

The 2008 IPC Ice Sledge Hockey World Championships was the fourth IPC Ice Sledge Hockey World Championships held between March 29, 2008, and April 5, 2008, in Marlborough, Massachusetts, United States, at the New England Sports Center. Organized by Massachusetts Hockey in co-operation with US Paralympics, around 200 athletes from ten countries participated in the 10-team round robin tournament which featured two divisions: six teams in group A and four teams in group B.

== A Tournament ==
The A Tournament was held between Canada, Germany, Italy, Japan, Norway and the United States, all teams which had competed at the Torino 2006 Paralympic Winter Games and which were then-ranked as the world's best sledge hockey teams.

=== Final rankings ===
Gold	Silver	Bronze	4th	5th	6th
Canada Bradley Bowden; Billy Bridges A Adam Dixon; Marc Dorion; Raymond Grassi; Jean Labonté C Hervé Lord A Shawn Matheson; Graeme Murray; Todd Nicholson; Mark Noot; Paul Rosen; Benoît St-Amand; Dany Verner; Greg Westlake	Norway Audun Bakke; Helge Bjørnstad; Eskil Hagen; Lloyd Remi Johansen; Roger Johansen; Knut André Nordstoga; Rolf Einar Pedersen; Tommy Rovelstad; Kjell Vidar Røyne; Stig Tore Svee; Johan Siqveland; Morten Værnes C	United States Mike Blabac; Steve Cash; Taylor Chace; Jim Connelly; Brad Emmerson; Mike Hallman; Tim Jones; Taylor Lipsett; Chris Manns C Bruce Nelson; Adam Page; Alex Salamone; Greg Shaw; Nick Teodoro; Bubba Torres	Japan Mikio Annaka; Takayuki Endo; Shinobu Fukushima; Naohiko Ishida; Noritaka Ito; Makoto Majima; Eiji Misawa; Mitsuru Nagase; Toshiyuki Nakamura; Satoru Sudo; Kazuhiro Takahashi; Daisuke Uehara; Mamoru Yoshikawa	Germany Gerd Bleidorn; Sebastiaan Disveld; Thorsten Ellmer; Sebastian Kessler; Matthias Koch; Marco Lahrs; Robert Pabst; Christian Pilz; Rolf Rabe; Frank Rennhack; Udo Segreff; Sven Stumpe; Jorg Wedde; Rolf-Dieter Wesler	Italy Bruno Balossetti; Gianluca Cavaliere; Andrea Chiarotti; Giuseppe Condello; Valerio Corvino; Ivan Ghironzi; Rupert Kanestrin; Gregory Leperdi; Florian Planker; Gianluigi Rosa; Santino Stillitano; Werner Winkler

=== Preliminary round ===
==== Standings ====
Rk.	Team	GP	W	OTW	OTL	L	GF	GA	DIF	PIM	SHOTS	SV	PTS
1	Canada	5	5	0	0	0	28	5	+23	75	123	61	10
2	Norway	5	4	0	0	1	16	9	+7	56	92	69	8
3	United States	5	3	0	0	2	16	8	+8	66	68	66	6
4	Japan	5	2	0	0	3	10	15	-5	48	81	65	4
5	Italy	5	0	1	0	4	5	28	-23	64	38	96	2
6	Germany	5	0	0	1	4	9	19	-10	141	108	64	0

- PIM, SHOTS and SV counted in 6 games

Schedule

All times are local (UTC-5)

Sat March 29, 2008; 14:00 (UTC-5)	Canada	11 – 0 (2 - 0, 3 - 0, 6 - 0)	Italy	New England Sports Center, Marlborough; Attendance: 1,500

Herve Lord 6:05, 37:50; Greg Westlake 11:27, 17:22; Billy Bridges 24:47 (PP), 34:21, 43:37; Marc Dorion 25:34; Todd Nicholson 37:13; Raymond Grassi 41:44 (PP); Graeme Murray 42:21 / Goals

Sat March 29, 2008; 16:30 (UTC-5)	Germany	0 – 1 (0 - 0, 0 - 0, 0 - 1)	Norway	New England Sports Center, Marlborough

Goals / 41:54 Tommy Rovelstad

Sat March 29, 2008; 19:00 (UTC-5)	United States	5 – 1 (2 - 0, 3 - 1, 0 - 0)	Japan	New England Sports Center, Marlborough

Taylor Lipsett 12:22, 14:56, 18:15; Taylor Chace 22:06; Jimmy Connelly 28:44 / Goals / 25:20 (PP) Mamoru Yoshikawa

Sun March 30, 2008; 14:00 (UTC-5)	United States	4 – 0 (1 - 0, 1 - 0, 2 - 0)	Italy	New England Sports Center, Marlborough

Jimmy Connelly 12:54; Taylor Chace 20:41; Chris Manns 39:40 (PP); Taylor Lipsett 43:28 / Goals

Sun March 30, 2008; 16:30 (UTC-5)	Norway	5 – 1 (0 - 1, 4 - 0, 1 - 0)	Japan	New England Sports Center, Marlborough

Rolf Einar Pedersen 24:19, 24:25, 28:35; Helge Bjørnstad 29:03, 34:12 / Goals / 12:54 Takahiko Sudo

Sun March 30, 2008; 19:00 (UTC-5)	Canada	6 – 3 (3 - 0, 0 - 1, 3 - 2)	Germany	New England Sports Center, Marlborough; Attendance: 105

Billy Bridges 4:26, 10:37 (SHG), 40:24; Greg Westlake 12:34; Jean Labonté 30:33; Adam Dixon 34:34 (PP) / Goals / 20:24 (PP) Bas Disveld; 33:59 (PP) Sebastien Kessler; 40:50 Jorg Wedde

Tue April 1, 2008; 14:00 (UTC-5)	Italy	4 – 3 (SO) (1 - 2, 0 - 0, 2 - 1, 1 - 0 (OT))	Germany	New England Sports Center, Marlborough

Florian Planker 8:39, 37:34; Bruno Balossetti 34:05; Andrea Chiarotti 50:00 (PS) / Goals / 7:55 Udo Segreff; 14:43 Sebastian Kessler; 31:44 Gerd Bleidorn

Tue April 1, 2008; 16:30 (UTC-5)	Japan	1 – 3 (0 - 1, 0 - 2, 1 - 0)	Canada	New England Sports Center, Marlborough; Attendance: 130

Satoru Sudo 34:04 / Goals / 5:01 Graeme Murray; 15:20 Bradley Bowden; 21:58 Todd Nicholson

Tue April 1, 2008; 19:00 (UTC-5)	Norway	3 – 2 (1 - 0, 2 - 1, 0 - 1)	United States	New England Sports Center, Marlborough

Morten Værnes 1:51; Helge Bjørnstad 17:31; Tommy Rovelstad 20:28 (PP) / Goals / 27:33 (PP), 36:46 (PP) Chris Manns

Wed April 2, 2008; 12:30 (UTC-5)	Japan	3 – 2 (0 - 0, 1 - 1, 2 - 1)	Germany	New England Sports Center, Marlborough

Daisuke Uehara 23:49 (PP); Satoru Sudo 32:15 (PP); Naohiko Ishida 37:55 / Goals / 21:11 (SH) Jörg Wedde; 39:25 Frank Rennhack

Wed April 2, 2008; 15:00 (UTC-5)	Norway	6 – 1 (2 - 1, 2 - 0, 2 - 0)	Italy	New England Sports Center, Marlborough

Stig Tore Svee 2:49; Eskil Hagen 3:21; Rolf Einar Pedersen16:15; Knut André Nordstoga 22:48; Helge Bjørnstad 33:31; Tommy Rovelstad 37:16 / Goals / 5:31 Werner Winkler

Wed April 2, 2008; 20:00 (UTC-5)	Canada	3 – 0 (1 - 0, 1 - 0, 1 - 0)	United States	New England Sports Center, Marlborough

Bradley Bowden 0:33; Adam Dixon 29:41, 38:13 (PP) / Goals

Fri April 4, 2008; 12:00 (UTC-5)	Italy	0 – 4 (0 - 1, 0 - 0, 0 - 3)	Japan	New England Sports Center, Marlborough

Goals / 3:45 Kazuhiro Takahashi; 34:52 Takayuki Endo; 35:51 Satoru Sudo; 43:01 Naohiko Ishida

Fri April 4, 2008; 14:40 (UTC-5)	United States	5 – 1 (3 - 0, 0 - 1, 2 - 0)	Germany	New England Sports Center, Marlborough

Brad Emmerson 0:27, 35:49; Adam Page 5:58; Bubba Torres 13:30 (PP); Greg Shaw 44:23 (PP) / Goals / 18:13 Adam Page

Fri April 4, 2008; 17:20 (UTC-5)	Norway	1 – 5 (0 - 2, 1 - 1, 0 - 2)	Canada	New England Sports Center, Marlborough

Rolf Einar Pedersen 22:36 (SH) / Goals / 4:17 (SH) Marc Dorion; 7:45 (PP) Adam Dixon; 26:03 Bradley Bowden; 36:50, 40:15 Greg Westlake

=== Final round ===
5th place playoff

Sat April 5, 2008; 11:50 (UTC-5)	Germany A5	6 – 1 (4 - 0, 0 - 1, 2 - 0)	A6 Italy	New England Sports Center, Marlborough

Frank Rennhack 1:12; Udo Segreff 2:59, 34:24 (SH); Gerd Bleidorn 4:29; Sebastian Kessler 14:29 (PP); Sven Stumpe 30:26 / Goals / 16:41 Gregory Leperdi

Bronze medal game

Sat April 5, 2008; 16:30 (UTC-5)	United States A3	3 – 1 (2 - 0, 1 - 0, 0 - 1)	A4 Japan	New England Sports Center, Marlborough

Jimmy Connelly 5:29 (PP); Alex Salamone 14:59, 26:38 / Goals / 39:15 (PP) Daisuke Uehara

Gold medal game

Sat April 5, 2008; 19:30 (UTC-5)	Canada A1	3 – 2 (1 - 0, 0 - 1, 2 - 1)	A2 Norway	New England Sports Center, Marlborough

Billy Bridges 7:51; Adam Dixon 36:41 (PP); Greg Westlake 44:50 / Goals / 15:23 (PP) Kjell Vidar Røyne; 30:41 Eskil Hagen

== B Tournament ==
The B Tournament was held between Czech Republic, Estonia, South Korea and Poland, the second tier elite teams all vying for a position in the 2009 IPC Ice Sledge Hockey World Championships A Tournament.

=== Final rankings ===
Rank	Nation	Roster
1	South Korea	Cho Byeong-seok, Cho Young-jae, Choi Hyuk-jun, Han Min-su, Hong Jae-wa, Jang Jong-ho, Jung Hee-chul, Jung Seung-hwan, Jung Young-hoon, Lee Hae-man, Lee Jong-kyung, Lee Yong-min, Park Sang-hyun, Park Woo-chul, Sa Seong-keun.
2	Czech Republic	Jiří Berger C, Erik Fojtík A, Michal Geier, Zdeněk Hábl, Miroslav Hrbek, Daniel Kalina, Zdeněk Klíma, Martin Kovář, Zdeněk Krupička, Pavel Kubeš, Tomáš Kvoch, Jan Matoušek, Michal Vápenka.
3	Estonia	Aare Aasamets, Tarmo Eerma, Valeri Falkenberg, Aleksander Jarlõkov, Kaido Kalm C, Tarmo Kolk, Ivar Liiv, Arvi Piirioja, Andrei Sokolov, Imre Tiitsu, Alar Õige.
4	Poland	Łukasz Ciuła, Sylwester Czyż, Jarosław Czyżewski, Sylwester Flis, Rafał Fusiek, Marcin Hebda, Zbigniew Kempiński, Jacek Kozłowski, Jan Maliszak, Andrzej Młynarczyk, Jacek Sapela, Jan Skapowicz, Michał Suliga, Arkadiusz Zoga, Piotr Truszkowski, Krzysztof Wojtaszek, Tomasz Woźny.

=== Preliminary round ===
==== Standings ====
Rk.	Team	GP	W	OTW	OTL	L	GF	GA	DIF	PIM	SHOTS	SV	PTS
1	South Korea	3	3	0	0	0	14	4	+10	22	18	4	6
2	Czech Republic	3	2	0	0	1	11	3	+8	24	17	9	4
3	Estonia	3	1	0	0	2	9	6	+3	40	10	15	2
4	Poland	3	0	0	0	3	1	22	-21	16	5	10	0

Schedule

All times are local (UTC-5)

Sat March 29, 2008; 9:00 (UTC-5)	South Korea	2 – 1 (1 - 1, 1 - 0, 0 - 0)	Czech Republic	New England Sports Center, Marlborough

Byeongseok Cho 3:55; Minsu Han 21:24 / Goals / 1:12 Jiří Berger

Sat March 29, 2008; 11:30 (UTC-5)	Poland	0 – 6 (0 - 1, 0 - 3, 0 - 2)	Estonia	New England Sports Center, Marlborough

Goals / 1:19, 27:49 Imre Tiitsu; 20:24, 39:08 Ivar Liiv; 21:37 Tarmo Eerma; 41:08 Arvi Piirioja

Sun March 30, 2008; 9:00 (UTC-5)	South Korea	4 – 2 (3 - 2, 1 - 0, 0 - 0)	Estonia	New England Sports Center, Marlborough

Lee Yong-min 3:37, 21:27; Park Woo-chul 10:28; Jung Seung-hwan 13:50 / Goals / 0:20 Kaido Kalm; 10:53 Imre Tiitsu

Sun March 30, 2008; 11:30 (UTC-5)	Poland	0 – 8 (0 - 3, 0 - 4, 0 - 1)	Czech Republic	New England Sports Center, Marlborough

Goals / 0:12 Erik Fojtík; 3:53, 16:06 Zdeněk Krupička; 13:30, 28:38 Jiří Berger; 16:34 Martin Kovář; 21:43 Michal Geier; 30:44 Zdeněk Hábl

Tue April 1, 2008; 9:00 (UTC-5)	Czech Republic	2 – 1 (1 - 1, 0 - 0, 1 - 0)	Estonia	New England Sports Center, Marlborough

Jiří Berger 13:32; Michal Geier 36:37 / Goals / 1:29 Imre Tiitsu

Tue April 1, 2008; 11:30 (UTC-5)	Poland	1 – 8 (1 - 2, 0 - 4, 0 - 2)	South Korea	New England Sports Center, Marlborough

Sylwester Flis 3:46 / Goals / 11:39 Han Min-su; 12:38 Lee Yong-min; 15:59, 26:46 Jung Seung-hwan; 21:17 Park Sang-hyun; 28:28 Lee Jong-kyung; 32:20 Cho Byeong-seok; 41:43 Cho Young-jae

=== Final round ===
9th place playoff

Wed April 2, 2008; 10:00 (UTC-5)	Estonia B3	8 – 2 (1 - 0, 4 - 0, 3 - 2)	B4 Poland	New England Sports Center, Marlborough

Imre Tiitsu 6:53, 35:47; Kaido Kalm 19:11, 22:54, 34:12; Ivar Liiv 20:06; Tarmo Eerma 28:32; Andrei Sokolov 39:27 / Goals / 31:30, 33:10 Sylwester Flis

7th place playoff

Wed April 2, 2008; 17:30 (UTC-5)	South Korea B1	2 – 0 (2 - 0, 0 - 0, 0 - 0)	B2 Czech Republic	New England Sports Center, Marlborough

Seongkeun Sa 2:24; Minsu Han 7:56 / Goals

== See also ==
- Ice sledge hockey
- Ice hockey#Sledge hockey
- Ice sledge hockey at the 2006 Winter Paralympics
- 2004 IPC Ice Sledge Hockey World Championships
