= 2009 IPC Ice Sledge Hockey World Championships =

2009 IPC Ice Sledge Hockey World Championships (A Tournament)

Tournament details
- Host country: Czech Republic
- Venue(s): SAREZ winter stadium, Ostrava
- Dates: 9–16 May 2009
- Teams: 8

Final positions
- Champions: United States (1st title)
- Runners-up: Norway
- Third place: Canada
- Fourth place: Japan

Official website
- Sledge2009.cz

The 2009 IPC Ice Sledge Hockey World Championships was the fifth IPC Ice Sledge Hockey World Championships that took place in early 2009. The competition was divided into two tournaments, with Tournament B held from 15 to 21 March in Eindhoven, the Netherlands, and Tournament A held from 9 to 16 May in Ostrava, the Czech Republic. A total of thirteen teams participated; eight in Tournament A and five in Tournament B. The top six teams from Tournament A automatically qualified for the 2010 Winter Paralympics in Vancouver, British Columbia, Canada. The remaining two teams from Tournament A and the top two teams from Tournament B will play in the 2009 IPC Ice Sledge Hockey Paralympic Qualifier to determine who will take the remaining two Paralympic slots.

== A Tournament ==
The A Tournament was held between the eight top-ranked national teams. The tournament was further divided into two groups of four teams each. Group A included Canada, the Czech Republic, Germany, Japan. Group B included Italy, Norway, South Korea, and the United States.

=== Final rankings ===
Gold	Silver	Bronze	4th
United States Mike Blabac; Steve Cash; Jimmy Connelly; Mike Hallman; Lonnie Hannah; Chris Manns; Kip St. Germaine; Brad Emmerson; Taylor Chace; Tim Jones; Taylor Lipsett; Adam Page; Greg Shaw; Bubba Torres; Andy Yohe	Norway Kissinger Deng; Roger Johansen; Eskil Hagen; Tommy Rovelstad; Stig Tore Svee; Ole Bjarte Austvoll; Audun Bakke; Helge Bjørnstad; Loyd Remi Johansen; Knut Andre Nordstoga; Rolf Einar Pedersen; Kjell Vidar Røyne; Trygve Larsen; Morten Værnes	Canada Paul Rosen; Benoit St-Amand; Adam Dixon; Raymond Grassi; Jean Labonté; Mark Noot; Bradley Bowden; Billy Bridges; Matthew Cook; Marc Dorion; Hévre Lord; Shawn Matheson; Graeme Murray; Todd Nicholson; Greg Westlake	Japan Shinobu Fukushima; Mitsuru Nagase; Takayuki Endo; Naohiko Ishida; Eiji Misawa; Satoru Sudo; Mikio Annaka; Noritaka Ito; Makoto Majima; Toshiyuki Nakamura; Kazuhiro Takahashi; Daisuke Uehara; Atsuya Yaguchi; Mamoru Yoshikawa

5th	6th	7th	8th
Czech Republic Jan Matoušek; Michal Vápenka; Miroslav Hrbek; Zdeněk Klíma; Pavel Kubeš; Tomáš Kvoch; Jiří Berger; Erik Fojtík; Michal Geier; Zdeněk Hábl; Zdeněk Krupička; David Palát; Jiří Raul; Zdeněk Šafránek	Italy Rupert Kanestrin; Santino Stillitano; Bruno Balossetti; Gianluca Cavaliere; Giuseppe Condello; Valerio Corvino; Ambrogio Magistrelli; Giovanni Colaone; Andrea Chiarotti; Gregory Leperdi; Florian Planker; Gianluigi Rosa; Werner Winkler	South Korea Choi Hyuk-jun; Jung Young-hoon; Hong Jae-hwa; Lee Jong-kyung; Han Min-su; Lee Yong-min; Cho Young-jae; Cho Byeong-seok; Kim Dea-jung; Lee Hae-man; Jang Jong-ho; Park Sang-hyun; Sa Seong-keun; Jung Seung-hwan; Park Woo-chul	Germany Rolf Rabe; Lars Uhlemann; Matthias Koch; Marco Lars; Robert Pabst; Jörg Wedde; Christoph Appelkamp; Gerd Bleidorn; Sebastien Disveld; Torsten Ellmer; Marc Müller; Christian Pilz; Frank Rennhack; Udo Segreff; Sven Stumpe

== B Tournament ==
2009 IPC Ice Sledge Hockey World Championships (B Tournament)
Tournament details
- Host country: Netherlands
- Venue: Eindhoven
- Dates: 15–21 March 2009
- Teams: 5

Final positions
- Champions: Estonia (1st title)
- Runners-up: Sweden
- Third place: Poland

The B Tournament was held between five lower-ranked national teams: Estonia, Great Britain, the Netherlands, Poland, and Sweden.

=== Preliminary round ===
Pos	Team	Pld	W	OTW	OTL	L	GF	GA	GD	Pts
1	Sweden	4	4	0	0	0	19	2	+17	12
2	Estonia	4	3	0	0	1	23	5	+18	9
3	Poland	4	2	0	0	2	18	7	+11	6
4	Great Britain	4	1	0	0	3	9	34	−25	3
5	Netherlands (H)	4	0	0	0	4	2	23	−21	0

Source: IPC
(H) Host

15 March 2009; 11:00	Great Britain	8–2 (1–0, 4–1, 3–1)	Netherlands	Eindhoven Icestadium

15 March 2009; 16:00	Sweden	3–1	Poland	Eindhoven Icestadium

16 March 2009; 11:00	Estonia	1–3	Sweden	Eindhoven Icestadium

16 March 2009; 16:00	Poland	10–1	Great Britain	Eindhoven Icestadium

17 March 2009; 11:00	Estonia	12–0	Great Britain	Eindhoven Icestadium

17 March 2009; 16:00	Poland	5–0	Netherlands	Eindhoven Icestadium

19 March 2009; 11:00	Netherlands	0–7	Estonia	Eindhoven Icestadium

19 March 2009; 16:00	Sweden	10–0	Great Britain	Eindhoven Icestadium

20 March 2009; 11:00	Estonia	3–2	Poland	Eindhoven Icestadium

20 March 2009; 16:00	Netherlands	0–3 (0–2, 0–0, 0–1)	Sweden	Eindhoven Icestadium

=== Final round ===
==== Third place game ====
21 March 2009; 11:00	Poland	5–1 (0–0, 3–0, 2–1)	Great Britain	Eindhoven Icestadium

==== Final ====
21 March 2009; 16:00	Sweden	0–1 (0–1, 0–0, 0–0)	Estonia	Eindhoven Icestadium

=== Final rankings ===
Rank	Team
1	Estonia ▲
2	Sweden
3	Poland
4	Great Britain
5	Netherlands

== See also ==
- it:Campionato del mondo di hockey su slittino - Gruppo B 2009 (in Italian) (B-Pool results)
