= Czech Republic at the 2010 Winter Paralympics =

- IPC code: CZE
- NPC: Czech Paralympic Committee
- Website: www.paralympic.cz

in Vancouver
- Competitors: 18 in 2 sports
- Flag bearer: Anna Kuliskova
- Medals Ranked 20th: Gold 0 Silver 0 Bronze 1 Total 1

Winter Paralympics appearances (overview)
- 1994; 1998; 2002; 2006; 2010; 2014; 2018; 2022; 2026

Other related appearances
- Czechoslovakia (1976–1992)

The Czech Republic competed at the 2010 Winter Paralympics in Vancouver. 19 athletes competed in 2 disciplines.

== Competitors ==
The following is the list of number of competitors participating at the Games per sport/discipline.

| Sport | Men | Women | Total |
|---|---|---|---|
| Alpine skiing | 3 | 1 | 4 |
| Ice sledge hockey | 14 | 0 | 14 |
| Total | 17 | 1 | 18 |

== Medalists ==
| Medal | Name | Sport | Event | Date |
|---|---|---|---|---|
| Bronze | Anna Kulíšková | Alpine skiing | Women's super-G, visually impaired | 19 March |

== Alpine skiing ==
Four athletes representing the Czech Republic participated in Alpine skiing.

Men

| Athlete | Event | Run 1 | | | Run 2 | | | Final/Total | | |
| Athlete | Event | Time | Diff | Rank | Time | Diff | Rank | Time | Diff | Rank |
|---|---|---|---|---|---|---|---|---|---|---|
| Stanislav Loska | Men's downhill standing | —N/a | | | | | | 1:26.93 | +6.13 | 18 |
| Stanislav Loska | Men's super-G standing | —N/a | | | | | | 1:27.21 | +7.10 | 13 |
| Stanislav Loska | Men's super combined | 1:29.77 | +8.40 | 12 | 52.35 | +4.01 | 9 | 2:22.12 | +10.28 | 12 |
| Stanislav Loska | Men's giant slalom standing | 1:16.02 | +4.22 | 13 | 1:17.26 | +5.14 | 12 | 2:33.28 | +9.36 | 13 |
| Stanislav Loska | Men's slalom standing | 56.68 | +5.73 | 14 | 54.99 | +2.39 | 11 | 1:51.67 | +6.27 | 14 |
| Oldřich Jelínek | Men's super-G sitting | —N/a | | | | | | 1:34.62 | +14.64 | 24 |
| Oldřich Jelínek | Men's giant slalom sitting | 1:33.73 | +15.92 | 26 | DNF | | | | | |
| Oldřich Jelínek | Men's slalom sitting | 1:01.07 | +13.50 | 31 | 1:08.60 | +20.20 | 24 | 2:09.65 | +28.02 | 23 |
| Radim Kozlovský | Men's super-G sitting | —N/a | | | | | | 1:39.02 | +19.04 | 28 |
| Radim Kozlovský | Men's giant slalom sitting | 1:33.40 | +15.59 | 25 | DNF | | | | | |
| Radim Kozlovský | Men's slalom sitting | 1:04.03 | +16.46 | 32 | 1:11.40 | +23.00 | 26 | 2:15.44 | +33.81 | 28 |

Women

| Athlete | Event | Run 1 | | | Run 2 | | | Final/Total | | |
| Athlete | Event | Time | Diff | Rank | Time | Diff | Rank | Time | Diff | Rank |
|---|---|---|---|---|---|---|---|---|---|---|
| Anna Kulíšková; Guide: Michaela Hubačová | Women's downhill Visually impaired | —N/a | | | | | | DNF | | |
| Anna Kulíšková; Guide: Michaela Hubačová | Women's super-G Visually impaired | —N/a | | | | | | 1:38.02 | +4.21 | Bronze medal |
| Anna Kulíšková; Guide: Michaela Hubačová | Women's super combined Visually impaired | DNF | | | | | | | | |
| Anna Kulíšková; Guide: Michaela Hubačová | Women's giant slalom Visually impaired | DSQ | | | | | | | | |
| Anna Kulíšková; Guide: Michaela Hubačová | Women's slalom Visually impaired | 1:16.69 | +10.79 | 10 | 1:16.88 | +12.22 | 10 | 2:33.57 | +33.01 | 10 |

== Ice sledge hockey ==
The Czech Republic competed in ice sledge hockey.

Team
Jiri Berger
Erik Fojtik
Michal Geier
Zdenek Habl
Roman Herink
Miroslav Hrbek
Zdenek Klima
Zdenek Krupicka
Pavel Kubes
Tomas Kvoch
Jan Matoušek
David Palat
Jiri Raul
Zdenek Safranek
Michal Vapenka

Summary

Key:

- OT – Overtime
- GWS – Match decided by penalty-shootout

| Team | Group stage | | | | Semifinal / Pl. | Final / BM / Pl. | |
| Team | Opposition Score | Opposition Score | Opposition Score | Rank | Opposition Score | Opposition Score | Rank |
|---|---|---|---|---|---|---|---|
| Czech Republic men's | Japan; L 1–2 | United States; L 0–2 | South Korea; W 4–2 | 3 | Italy; W 3–2 GWS | South Korea; W 2–1 OT | 5 |

Preliminaries

| Pos | Team | Pld | W | OTW | OTL | L | GF | GA | GD | Pts | Qualification |
|---|---|---|---|---|---|---|---|---|---|---|---|
| 1 | United States | 3 | 3 | 0 | 0 | 0 | 14 | 0 | +14 | 9 | Semifinals |
| 2 | Japan | 3 | 2 | 0 | 0 | 1 | 7 | 7 | 0 | 6 | Semifinals |
| 3 | Czech Republic | 3 | 1 | 0 | 0 | 2 | 5 | 7 | −2 | 3 | 5–8th place semifinals |
| 4 | South Korea | 3 | 0 | 0 | 0 | 3 | 2 | 14 | −12 | 0 | 5–8th place semifinals |

Source: Vancouver 2010

| 13 March 2010; 20:30 | Japan | 2–1 (0–0, 1–0, 1–1) | Czech Republic | UBC Thunderbird Arena, Vancouver; Attendance: 2,752 |

Game reference

Mitsuru Nagase
Goalies
Michal Vápenka
Referee:
(Norway) Petter Vojan Hegle
Linesmen:
(United States) William Marcotte
(United States) Brad Anton Roethlisberger

| Endo (Sudo, Takahashi) – 15:11 | 1–0 |
| | 1–1 | 33:06 – Hábl (Kvoch, Geier) |
| Ishida (Uehara) – 38:19 | 2–1 |

8 min
Penalties
4 min
18
Shots
9

| 14 March 2010; 17:00 | Czech Republic | 0–3 (0–1, 0–1, 0–1) | United States | UBC Thunderbird Arena, Vancouver; Attendance: 5,170 |

Game reference

Michal Vápenka
Goalies
Steve Cash
Referee:
(Canada) Paul Matte
Linesmen:
(Canada) Eric Dagenais
(Norway) Kai Gunnar Thøger-Andresen

| 0–1 | 07:53 – Lipsett (Salamone, Chace) (PP) |
| 0–2 | 27:01 – Salamone |
| 0–3 | 33:44 – Connelly (Yohe, Howard) (PP) |

6 min
Penalties
12 min
6
Shots
23

| 16 March 2010; 10:00 | Czech Republic | 4–2 (2–0, 2–0, 0–2) | South Korea | UBC Thunderbird Arena, Vancouver; Attendance: 4,791 |

Game reference

Jan Matoušek
Goalies
Choi Hyuk-jun
Chung Young-hoon
Referee:
(United States) Scott Bokal
Linesmen:
(United States) Brian Frerichs
(Estonia) Maksim Toode

| Krupička (SH) – 02:29 | 1–0 |
| Kvoch (Hábl, Geier) (PP2) – 14:11 | 2–0 |
| Kubeš (Geier) – 20:28 | 3–0 |
| Fojtík – 26:18 | 4–0 |
| | 4–1 | 41:46 – Cho B. (Lee J., Park S.) (PP) |
| | 4–2 | 44:51 – Lee J. (Cho B.) |

14 min
Penalties
12 min
21
Shots
7

=== 5–8th place semifinals ===
| 17 March 2010; 12:00 | Czech Republic | 3–2 GWS (1–0, 1–2, 0–0) (OT: 0–0) (SO: 1–0) | Italy | UBC Thunderbird Arena, Vancouver; Attendance: 5,092 |

Game reference

Michal Vápenka
Goalies
Santino Stillitano
Referee:
(United States) Derek Berkebile
Linesmen:
(United States) William Marcotte
(Estonia) Maksim Toode

| Geier (PP) – 09:51 | 1–0 |
| Krupička (Kvoch, Šafránek) (PP) – 18:21 | 2–0 |
| | 2–1 | 21:19 – Rosa (Planker, Cavaliere) (PP) |
| | 2–2 | 29:17 – Chiarotti (Planker, Rosa) (PP) |

Fojtík
Berger (miss)
Shootout
(miss) Rosa
(miss) Planker
(miss) Cavaliere
12 min
Penalties
12 min
15
Shots
15

=== Fifth place game ===
| 19 March 2010; 15:30 | Czech Republic | 2–1 OT (0–0, 0–0, 1–1) (OT: 1–0) | South Korea | UBC Thunderbird Arena, Vancouver; Attendance: 5,507 |

Game reference

Michal Vápenka
Goalies
Choi Hyuk-jun
Referee:
(United States) Scott Bokal
Linesmen:
(Canada) Eric Dagenais
(Poland) Tomasz Heltman

| | 0–1 | 32:59 – Park S. (Lee J., Han) |
| Fojtík (Kubeš, Krupička) – 37:24 | 1–1 |
| Geier (Kvoch, Fojtík) – 47:16 | 2–1 |

8 min
Penalties
6 min
20
Shots
16

== See also ==
- Czech Republic at the 2010 Winter Olympics
- Czech Republic at the Paralympics
