= Japan at the 2010 Winter Paralympics =

- IPC code: JPN
- NPC: Japan Paralympic Committee
- Website: www.jsad.or.jp (in Japanese)

in Vancouver
- Competitors: 42 in 5 sports
- Flag bearer: Takayuki Endo
- Medals Ranked 8th: Gold 3 Silver 3 Bronze 5 Total 11

Winter Paralympics appearances (overview)
- 1976; 1980; 1984; 1988; 1992; 1994; 1998; 2002; 2006; 2010; 2014; 2018; 2022; 2026

Japan sent 42 competitors to compete in all five disciplines at the 2010 Winter Paralympics in Vancouver.

== Medalists ==
Medal	Name	Sport	Event	Date
Gold	Yoshihiro Nitta	Cross country skiing	Men's 10 km classic, standing	18 March
Gold	Akira Kano	Alpine skiing	Men's super-G, sitting	20 March
Gold	Yoshihiro Nitta	Cross country skiing	Men's 1 km sprint classic, standing	21 March
Silver	Taiki Morii	Alpine skiing	Men's downhill, sitting	13 March
Silver	Mikio Annaka; Takayuki Endo; Shinobu Fukushima; Naohiko Ishida; Noritaka Ito; Makoto Majima; Tomohiko Maruo; Eiji Misawa; Mitsuru Nagase; Toshiyuki Nakamura; Satoru Sudo; Kazuhiro Takahashi; Daisuke Uehara; Atsuya Yaguchi; Mamoru Yoshikawa	Ice hockey	Tournaments	20 March
Silver	Shoko Ota	Cross country skiing	Women's 1 km sprint classic, standing	21 March
Bronze	Akira Kano	Alpine skiing	Men's downhill, sitting	13 March
Bronze	Kuniko Obinata	Alpine skiing	Women's slalom, sitting	15 March
Bronze	Kuniko Obinata	Alpine skiing	Women's giant slalom, sitting	17 March
Bronze	Takeshi Suzuki	Alpine skiing	Men's giant slalom, sitting	17 March
Bronze	Taiki Morii	Alpine skiing	Men's super-G, sitting	20 March

== Alpine skiing ==
- (gold) Akira Kano Men's super-G, sitting
- (silver) Taiki Morii Men's downhill, sitting
- (bronze) Taiki Morii Men's super-G, sitting
- (bronze) Akira Kano Men's downhill, sitting
- (bronze) Takeshi Suzuki Men's Giant Slalom, sitting
- (bronze) Kuniko Obinata Women's Giant Slalom, sitting
- (bronze) Kuniko Obinata Women's Slalom, sitting

== Cross-country skiing ==
- (gold) Yoshihiro Nitta Men's 1 km Sprint, standing
- (gold) Yoshihiro Nitta Men's 10 km Sprint, standing
- (silver) Shoko Ota Women's 1 km Sprint, standing

== Ice sledge hockey ==
Japan competed in ice sledge hockey. They finished the qualification rounds with a score of 2-1, and qualified for the semi-finals, where they defeated team Canada advancing to the finals where they faced Team America. In the finals they lost, scoring no goals winning a silver medal.

Squad list	Group stage (Pool A)		Semifinal	Final	
Squad list	Opposition Result	Rank	Opposition Result	Opposition Result	Rank
From: Mikio Annaka; Takayuki Endo; Shinobu Fukushima; Naohiko Ishida; Noritaka Ito; Makoto Majima; Tomohiko Maruo; Eiji Misawa; Mitsuru Nagase; Toshiyuki Nakamura; Satoru Sudo; Kazuhiro Takahashi; Daisuke Uehara; Atsuya Yaguchi; Mamoru Yoshikawa	Czech Republic; W 2–1	2 Q	Canada; W 3–1	United States; L 0-2	2nd place, silver medalist(s)
From: Mikio Annaka; Takayuki Endo; Shinobu Fukushima; Naohiko Ishida; Noritaka Ito; Makoto Majima; Tomohiko Maruo; Eiji Misawa; Mitsuru Nagase; Toshiyuki Nakamura; Satoru Sudo; Kazuhiro Takahashi; Daisuke Uehara; Atsuya Yaguchi; Mamoru Yoshikawa	South Korea; W 5–0	2 Q	Canada; W 3–1	United States; L 0-2	2nd place, silver medalist(s)
From: Mikio Annaka; Takayuki Endo; Shinobu Fukushima; Naohiko Ishida; Noritaka Ito; Makoto Majima; Tomohiko Maruo; Eiji Misawa; Mitsuru Nagase; Toshiyuki Nakamura; Satoru Sudo; Kazuhiro Takahashi; Daisuke Uehara; Atsuya Yaguchi; Mamoru Yoshikawa	United States; L 0–6	2 Q	Canada; W 3–1	United States; L 0-2	2nd place, silver medalist(s)

== Wheelchair curling ==
Japan competed in wheelchair curling.

== See also ==
- Japan at the 2010 Winter Olympics
- Japan at the Paralympics
