= United States at the 2006 Winter Paralympics =

- Flag of the United States
- IPC code: USA
- NPC: United States Paralympic Committee
- Website: www.teamusa.org/US-Paralympics

in Turin
- Competitors: 56 in 4 sports
- Flag bearers: Chris Devlin-Young (opening); Lonnie Hannah (closing)
- Medals Ranked 5th: Gold 7 Silver 2 Bronze 3 Total 12

Winter Paralympics appearances (overview)
- 1976; 1980; 1984; 1988; 1992; 1994; 1998; 2002; 2006; 2010; 2014; 2018; 2022; 2026

The United States sent 56 athletes (45 men and 11 women) to the 2006 Winter Paralympics in Turin, Italy, the largest delegation of any nation. Chris Devlin-Young, a 15-year veteran of the U.S. Disabled Ski Team and four-time Paralympic medalist in alpine skiing, served as the flag bearer at the opening ceremonies. ice sledge hockey player Lonnie Hannah, a member of the gold medal-winning U.S. team at the 2002 Winter Paralympics in Salt Lake City and the bronze medal-winning team in Turin, was the flag bearer at the closing ceremonies.

The U.S. finished fifth in the gold and seventh in the overall medal count. While the United States' total medal count was down from the 2002 Winter Paralympics because the number of disability classes in both alpine and Nordic skiing were significantly reduced, there were many standout U.S. performances. Steve Cook won three medals in Nordic skiing, including gold in the men's standing category of the 5K and the 10K. In alpine skiing, Laurie Stephens won three medals in the women's sitting category, including gold in the downhill and super G, while in the men's downhill, Kevin Bramble won gold in the sitting category and his teammate Chris Devlin-Young took the silver. Allison Jones and Sandy Dukat won gold and bronze, respectively, in the women's standing category of the slalom. Stephani Victor was the gold medal winner in the women's sitting slalom. The U.S. sledge hockey team was unable to repeat its gold medal from the 2002 Winter Paralympics after losing 4–2 to Norway in the semifinals, but held on to win the bronze by beating Germany 4–3.

== Medalists ==
American athletes won seven gold, two silver, and three bronze medals at the games. Laurie Stephens and Steve Cook both won multiple medals; Stephens took two golds and a silver in alpine skiing, and Cook won two golds and a bronze in cross-country skiing. In the 'by discipline' sections below, medalists' names are in bold.

Medal	Name	Sport	Event
Gold	Kevin Bramble	Alpine skiing	Men's downhill sitting
Gold	Allison Jones	Alpine skiing	Women's slalom standing
Gold	Laurie Stephens	Alpine skiing	Women's downhill sitting
Gold	Laurie Stephens	Alpine skiing	Women's super-G sitting
Gold	Stephani Victor	Alpine skiing	Women's slalom sitting
Gold	Steven Cook	Cross-country skiing	Men's 10 km standing
Gold	Steven Cook	Cross-country skiing	Men's 5 km standing
Silver	Christopher Devlin-Young	Alpine skiing	Men's downhill sitting
Silver	Laurie Stephens	Alpine skiing	Women's giant slalom sitting
Bronze	Sandy Dukat	Alpine skiing	Women's slalom standing
Bronze	Steven Cook	Cross-country skiing	Men's 20 km standing
Bronze	United States national ice sledge hockey team: Steven Cash; Taylor Chace; David Conklin; James Connelly; Brad Emmerson; Manuel Guerra; Michael Hallman; Lonnie Hannah; Joseph Howard; Tim Jones; Taylor Lipsett; Christopher Manns; Alexi Salamone; Kip St. Germaine; Andrew Yohe	Ice sledge hockey	Men's team

== Alpine skiing ==
The United States sent 27 alpine skiers to the Games, 20 men and 7 women. The men's team took home two medals, a gold and a silver won by Kevin Bramble and Christopher Devlin-Young, respectively, in the downhill sitting event. The women won six medals, including two in the slalom standing event: a gold won by Allison Jones and a bronze by Sandy Dukat. Laurie Stephens was the alpine skiing team's most prolific medalist, with two golds and one silver.

Men

Athlete	Events	Final		
Athlete	Events	Real time	Calculated time	Rank
Erik Bayindirli	Giant slalom sitting	2:40.35	2:15.85	33
Kevin Bramble	Downhill sitting	1:36.26	1:21.03	Gold medal
Kevin Bramble	Super-G sitting	1:32.14	1:17.69	10
Carl Burnett	Downhill sitting	1:39.68	1:22.48	5
Carl Burnett	Giant slalom sitting	2:29.73	2:06.85	22
Carl Burnett	Slalom sitting	2:06.93	1:36.98	16
Carl Burnett	Super-G sitting	1:41.40	1:24.26	31
Christopher Canfield	Giant slalom standing	2:15.17	2:04.15	31
Christopher Canfield	Slalom standing	Disqualified		
Christopher Canfield	Super-G standing	1:23.88	1:17.40	32
Nick Catanzarite	Downhill sitting	DNF		
Nick Catanzarite	Giant slalom sitting	2:51.97	2:16.35	34
Nick Catanzarite	Slalom sitting	DNF		
Nick Catanzarite	Super-G sitting	1:33.99	1:15.12	4
Christopher Devlin-Young	Downhill sitting	1:37.46	1:22.04	Silver medal
Christopher Devlin-Young	Giant slalom sitting	2:14.58	1:55.37	4
Christopher Devlin-Young	Slalom sitting	1:59.17	1:33.36	8
Christopher Devlin-Young	Super-G sitting	DNF		
Timothy Fox	Giant slalom standing	1:52.63	1:51.82	8
Timothy Fox	Slalom standing	DNF		
Timothy Fox	Super-G standing	1:15.03	1:14.66	20
Ralph Green	Downhill standing	DNF		
Ralph Green	Giant slalom standing	2:33.36	2:20.86	46
Ralph Green	Slalom standing	1:40.93	1:40.93	36
Ralph Green	Super-G standing	DNF		
Gerald Hayden	Downhill sitting	DNS		
Gerald Hayden	Giant slalom sitting	2:27.10	2:06.10	20
Gerald Hayden	Slalom sitting	2:06.32	1:38.97	19
Gerald Hayden	Super-G sitting	1:40.20	1:24.49	32
John Knudsen	Giant slalom sitting	2:27.09	2:07.56	25
James Lagerstrom	Downhill standing	1:22.70	1:22.49	6
James Lagerstrom	Giant slalom standing	1:59.61	1:58.74	20
James Lagerstrom	Slalom standing	1:31.49	1:30.61	23
James Lagerstrom	Super-G standing	1:15.31	1:14.94	22
Roger Lee	Downhill sitting	DNS		
Roger Lee	Giant slalom sitting	2:29.95	2:07.04	23
Roger Lee	Slalom sitting	2:08.66	1:38.30	18
Roger Lee	Super-G sitting	1:37.53	1:21.05	19
Monte Meier	Downhill standing	1:29.10	1:24.31	17
Monte Meier	Giant slalom standing	DNF		
Monte Meier	Slalom standing	1:24.03	1:24.03	8
Monte Meier	Super-G standing	1:20.39	1:14.18	17
Andrew Parr	Giant slalom visually impaired	2:16.14	2:04.01	8
Andrew Parr	Slalom visually impaired	1:52.66	1:34.83	9
Reed Robinson	Downhill standing	1:27.51	1:27.33	29
Reed Robinson	Giant slalom standing	1:59.70	1:59.46	24
Reed Robinson	Slalom standing	1:34.67	1:33.63	28
Reed Robinson	Super-G standing	1:18.62	1:18.46	40
George Sansonetis	Downhill standing	1:30.37	1:26.15	26
George Sansonetis	Giant slalom standing	2:07.39	1:58.34	18
George Sansonetis	Slalom standing	DNF		
George Sansonetis	Super-G standing	1:21.46	1:15.26	24
Josh Sundquist	Giant slalom standing	2:28.14	2:16.06	44
Josh Sundquist	Slalom standing	1:40.26	1:40.26	34
Joseph Tompkins	Downhill sitting	DNF		
Joseph Tompkins	Giant slalom sitting	2:45.43	2:20.16	37
Joseph Tompkins	Super-G sitting	1:40.20	1:23.27	28
Tyler Walker	Downhill sitting	1:40.71	1:25.79	15
Tyler Walker	Giant slalom sitting	2:13.97	1:56.18	6
Tyler Walker	Slalom sitting	2:00.26	1:35.49	14
Tyler Walker	Super-G sitting	1:31.13	1:17.75	11
Brad Washburn	Downhill standing	1:25.26	1:25.05	21
Brad Washburn	Giant slalom standing	1:56.45	1:55.60	15
Brad Washburn	Slalom standing	1:25.81	1:24.99	10
Brad Washburn	Super-G standing	1:16.30	1:15.93	30

Women

Athlete	Events	Final		
Athlete	Events	Real time	Calculated time	Rank
Sandy Dukat	Downhill standing	1:40.95	1:35.53	8
Sandy Dukat	Giant slalom standing	2:16.50	2:05.36	8
Sandy Dukat	Slalom standing	1:33.66	1:33.66	Bronze medal
Sandy Dukat	Super-G standing	1:26.85	1:20.14	6
Lacey Heward	Downhill sitting	1:56.71	1:36.57	4
Lacey Heward	Giant slalom sitting	2:48.20	2:22.50	8
Lacey Heward	Slalom sitting	2:28.63	1:53.56	4
Lacey Heward	Super-G sitting	1:45.42	1:27.60	8
Allison Jones	Downhill standing	1:40.58	1:35.18	7
Allison Jones	Giant slalom standing	2:14.10	2:03.16	5
Allison Jones	Slalom standing	1:30.14	1:30.14	Gold medal
Allison Jones	Super-G standing	1:26.04	1:19.39	4
Hannah Pennington	Giant slalom standing	2:30.68	2:20.80	19
Hannah Pennington	Slalom standing	2:03.23	1:49.35	16
Laurie Stephens	Downhill sitting	1:46.86	1:29.96	Gold medal
Laurie Stephens	Giant slalom sitting	2:25.95	2:05.11	Silver medal
Laurie Stephens	Slalom sitting	2:26.64	1:54.89	7
Laurie Stephens	Super-G sitting	1:33.88	1:19.16	Gold medal
Elitsa Storey	Downhill standing	1:42.69	1:37.17	9
Elitsa Storey	Giant slalom standing	2:22.08	2:10.49	7
Elitsa Storey	Slalom standing	1:37.33	1:37.33	6
Elitsa Storey	Super-G standing	1:27.22	1:20.48	7
Stephani Victor	Downhill sitting	DNS		
Stephani Victor	Giant slalom sitting	2:32.94	2:12.63	4
Stephani Victor	Slalom sitting	2:16.69	1:48.54	Gold medal
Stephani Victor	Super-G sitting	1:37.80	1:23.44	4

Key: DNF=Did not finish; DNS=Did not start

== Biathlon ==
The U.S. Paralympic biathlon team consisted of two women and one man. All three of these athletes also competed in cross-country skiing events at the Games. The highest placed finisher was Kelly Underkofler, who took fourth in the women's 12.5 km standing event.

Athlete	Events	Final				
Athlete	Events	Real time	Missed shots	Factor %	Finish time	Rank
Monica Bascio	Women's 7.5 km sitski	36:46.7	4	94	34:34.3	6
Monica Bascio	Women's 10 km sitski	43:37.7	10	94	51:00.6	5
Daniel Perkins	Men's 7.5 km standing	29:46.1	8	96	28:34.6	20
Daniel Perkins	Men's 12.5 km standing	DNF				
Kelly Underkofler	Women's 7.5 km standing	29:42.3	2	97	28:48.9	7
Kelly Underkofler	Women's 12.5 km standing	48:36.8	6	97	53:09.3	4

== Cross-country skiing ==
Nordic skiing: 3 women, 6 men

Women:

- Monica Bascio (36, Evergreen, Colorado)
- Candace Cable (51, Truckee, California)
- Kelly Underkofler (21, St. Paul, Minnesota/Frisco, Colorado)

Men:

- Bob Balk (40, Long Beach, California)
- Steven Cook (37, Salt Lake City)
- Mike Crenshaw (51, Boulder, Colorado)
- Chris Klebl (34, Heber City, Utah)
- Greg Mallory (37, Portland, Oregon)
- Dan Perkins (47, Syracuse, New York)

== Ice sledge hockey ==
Ice sledge hockey: 15 men

- Steven Cash (16, Overland, Missouri)
- Taylor Chace (19, Hampton Falls, New Hampshire)
- Dave Conklin (50, La Crosse, Wisconsin)
- James Connelly (16, Galloway, New Jersey)
- Brad Emmerson (20, Amherst, New York)
- Manuel Guerra, Jr (38, Plymouth, Minnesota)
- Michael Hallman (16, Hatboro, Pennsylvania)
- Lonnie Hannah II (42, Mansfield, Texas)
- Joseph Howard (39, Kingston, Massachusetts)
- Tim Jones (18, Mount Ephraim, New Jersey)
- Andrew Lipsett (19, Mesquite, Texas)
- Christopher Manns (25, Buffalo, New York)
- Alexi Salamone (18, Grand Island, New York)
- Kip St. Germaine (40, East Falmouth, Massachusetts)
- Andy Yohe (27, Bettendorf, Iowa)

== Wheelchair curling ==
Wheelchair curling: 1 woman, 4 men

Women:

- Danell Libby (37, Chatham, New York)

Men:

- James Joseph (44, New Hartford, New York)
- Augusto Perez (33, East Syracuse, New York)
- Jim Pierce (43, North Syracuse, New York)
- Wes Smith (65, Glenburn, Maine)

The youngest member of the 2006 United States Paralympic Team was James Connelly (ice sledge hockey; bronze), at the age of 16 years and 4 months. He was a rookie defenseman on the bronze medal-winning ice sledge hockey team, making him the United States' youngest winter medal-holding Paralympian in history.

== See also ==
- United States at the 2006 Winter Olympics
