= Ice sledge hockey at the 2010 Winter Paralympics =

2010 Winter Paralympics

Tournament details
- Host country: Canada
- Venue: UBC Winter Sports Centre
- Dates: 13–20 March 2010
- Teams: 8

Final positions
- Champions: United States (2nd title)
- Runners-up: Japan
- Third place: Norway
- Fourth place: Canada

Tournament statistics
- Games played: 20
- Goals scored: 82 (4.1 per game)
- Scoring leader: (Canada) Greg Westlake (11 points)

Awards
- MVP: (Canada) Brad Bowden

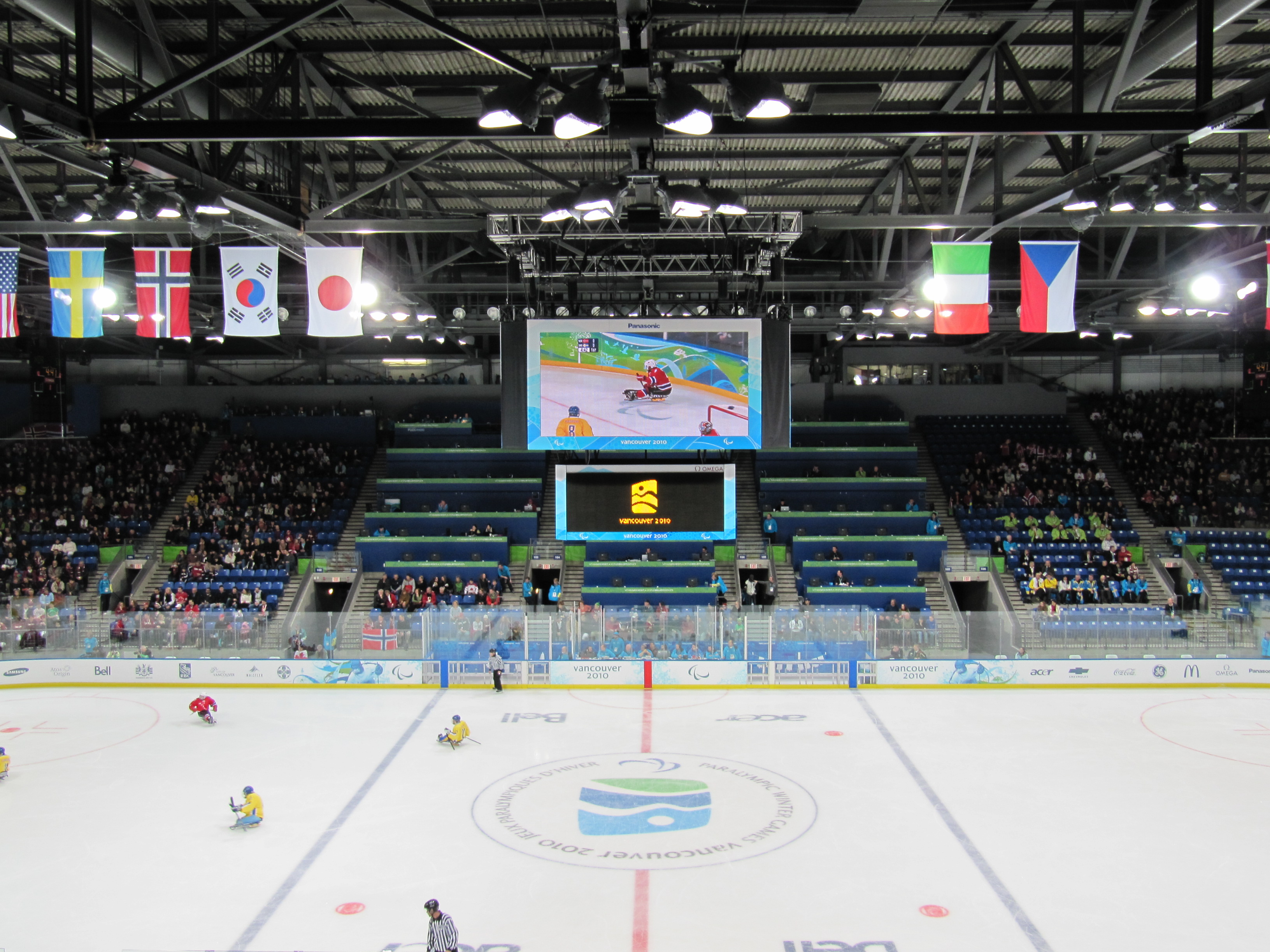
Norway vs Sweden ice sledge hockey game, at the UBC Thunderbird Winter Sports Centre, Vancouver.

The ice sledge hockey competition of the 2010 Winter Paralympics was held at the UBC Winter Sports Centre in Vancouver, British Columbia, Canada, from 13 March to 20 March 2010.

For the first time, women were allowed to compete in ice sledge hockey at the Paralympic Games.

Following high hopes in the host nation, Canada's defeat in the semi-finals was described as causing "national despair".

== Medalists ==
Event	Gold	Silver	Bronze
Mixed	United States; Mike Blabac; Steve Cash; Taylor Chace; Jimmy Connelly; Brad Emmerson; Joe Howard; Tim Jones; Nikko Landeros; Taylor Lipsett; Adam Page; Josh Pauls; Alexi Salamone; Greg Shaw; Bubba Torres; Andy Yohe; Coach: Ray Maluta	Japan (JPN); Mikio Annaka; Takayuki Endo; Shinobu Fukushima; Naohiko Ishida; Noritaka Ito; Makoto Majima; Tomohiko Maruo; Eiji Misawa; Mitsuru Nagase; Toshiyuki Nakamura; Satoru Sudo; Kazuhiro Takahashi; Daisuke Uehara; Atsuya Yaguchi; Mamoru Yoshikawa; Coach: Kojin Nakakita	Norway (NOR); Ole Bjarte Austevoll; Audun Bakke; Helge Bjørnstad; Kissinger Deng; Eskil Hagen; Thomas Jacobsen; Loyd Remi Johansen; Roger Johansen; Knut André Nordstoga; Rolf Einar Pedersen; Tommy Rovelstad; Kjell Vidar Røyne; Stig Tore Svee; Morten Værnes Coach: Morten Haglund

== Qualification ==
Six slots were reserved for the top six finishers at the 2009 IPC Ice Sledge Hockey World Championships, one slot was reserved for the winner of the 2009 IPC Ice Sledge Hockey Paralympic Qualifier, and one slot was reserved for the host country, Canada. Since Canada placed in the top six of the World Championships, the eighth slot was given to the second-place finisher at the Paralympic Qualifier.

Qualifying event	Date	Venue	Vacancies	Qualified
2009 World Championship	9–16 May 2009	(Czech Republic) Ostrava	6	United States; Norway; Canada; Japan; Czech Republic; Italy
Paralympic Last Chance Qualification Tournament	9–13 November 2009	(Sweden) Malmö	2	Sweden; South Korea

== Team rosters ==
The rules promulgated by the International Paralympic Committee provide that each participating NPC may enter a maximum of:

One men's team of fifteen eligible male athletes; or
One mixed team of up to sixteen eligible athletes of whom a minimum of one of the athletes is female.

It was reported that this decision was taken without consulting Canada, the reigning champion in the sport. Hockey Canada announced that there would be no women on the Canadian ice sledge hockey roster at the Paralympics, because no Canadian women play at that level. At the 2006 Paralympics in Turin, Sweden attempted to put a female player on their roster, but were not allowed to do so.

Canada
Name	Birthdate
Jeremy Booker	8 November 1986
Brad Bowden	26 May 1983
Billy Bridges	22 March 1984
Adam Dixon	13 August 1989
Marc Dorion	22 June 1987
Raymond Grassi	11 February 1983
Jean Labonte	20 March 1969
Herve Lord	3 March 1958
Shawn Matheson	6 May 1972
Graeme Murray	14 December 1984
Todd Nicholson	28 January 1969
Paul Rosen	26 April 1960
Benoit St-Amand	19 April 1978
Greg Westlake	12 June 1986
Derek Whitson	21 June 1989

Czech Republic
Name	Birthdate
Jiří Berger	22 June 1975
Erik Fojtík	7 May 1972
Michal Geier	7 April 1986
Zdeněk Hábl	17 April 1982
Roman Herink	12 September 1963
Miroslav Hrbek	26 February 1965
Zdeněk Klíma	21 January 1974
Zdeněk Krupička	22 February 1980
Pavel Kubeš	25 November 1983
Tomáš Kvoch	20 September 1966
Jan Matoušek	17 May 1985
David Palát	17 May 1984
Jiří Raul	10 October 1977
Zdeněk Šafránek	21 February 1982
Michal Vápenka	18 August 1973

Italy
Name	Birthdate
Gabriele Araudo	5 August 1974
Bruno Balossetti	14 June 1973
Gianluca Cavaliere	11 June 1971
Andrea Chiarotti	5 December 1966
Giuseppe Condello	21 August 1971
Valerio Corvino	15 November 1975
Rupert Kanestrin	6 November 1965
Grégory Leperdi	24 June 1973
Ambrogio Magistrelli	4 June 1960
Florian Planker	8 February 1977
Roberto Radice	27 August 1981
Gianluigi Rosa	27 June 1987
Igor Stella	28 December 1981
Santino Stillitano	26 June 1969
Werner Winkler	18 September 1968

Japan
Name	Birthdate
Mikio Annaka	15 August 1971
Takayuki Endo	19 March 1978
Shinobu Fukushima	14 December 1956
Naohiko Ishida	9 August 1967
Noritaka Ito	29 May 1983
Makoto Majima	24 August 1971
Tomohiko Maruo	7 March 1968
Eiji Misawa	22 February 1973
Mitsuru Nagase	23 January 1976
Toshiyuki Nakamura	8 March 1969
Satoru Sudo	23 October 1970
Kazuhiro Takahashi	4 December 1978
Daisuke Uehara	27 December 1981
Atsuya Yaguchi	27 November 1976
Mamoru Yoshikawa	18 February 1970

Norway
Name	Birthdate
Ole Bjarte Austevoll	6 August 1970
Audun Bakke	5 November 1988
Helge Bjornstad	14 October 1971
Kissinger Deng	31 May 1979
Eskil Hagen	13 June 1970
Thomas Jacobsen	4 November 1987
Loyd Remi Johansen	25 July 1987
Roger Johansen	4 February 1973
Knut André Nordstoga	18 February 1983
Rolf Einar Pedersen	4 November 1969
Tommy Rovelstad	8 November 1972
Kjell Vidar Røyne	1 August 1970
Stig Tore Svee	16 December 1963
Morten Værnes	6 December 1981

South Korea
Name	Birthdate
Cho Byeong-seok	6 June 1985
Cho Young-jae	10 January 1985
Choi Hyuk-jun	12 July 1972
Chung Young-hoon	5 May 1974
Han Min-su	3 June 1970
Jang Dong-shin	10 January 1976
Jang Jong-ho	29 March 1984
Jung Seung-hwan	9 January 1986
Kim Dea-jung	7 July 1970
Lee Hae-man	20 February 1972
Lee Jong-kyung	28 October 1973
Lee Yong-min	20 December 1974
Park Sang-hyeon	9 September 1973
Park Woo-chul	4 April 1973
Sa Sung-keun	27 January 1967

Sweden
Name	Birthdate
Aron Anderson	26 January 1988
Magnus Carlsson	3 July 1970
Jan Edbom	24 June 1957
Dedjo Engmark	16 March 1972
Marcus Holm	5 December 1973
Niklas Ingvarsson	3 June 1978
Jens Kask	20 April 1966
Per Kasperi	20 May 1993
Joakim Larsson	4 December 1969
Albin Lindell	15 February 1989
Rasmus Lundgren	13 August 1991
Ulf Nilsson	22 May 1964
Niklas Rakos	24 September 1986
Dan Svensson	5 January 1986
Anders Wistrand	7 April 1983

United States
Name	Birthdate
Mike Blabac	18 January 1974
Steve Cash	9 May 1989
Taylor Chace	9 May 1986
Jimmy Connelly	27 October 1989
Brad Emmerson	16 December 1985
Joe Howard	22 May 1966
Tim Jones	16 December 1987
Nikko Landeros	28 April 1989
Taylor Lipsett	20 January 1987
Adam Page	10 March 1992
Josh Pauls	31 December 1992
Alexi Salamone	17 June 1987
Greg Shaw	28 February 1990
Bubba Torres	31 October 1991
Andy Yohe	21 July 1978

== Preliminary round ==
All times are local (UTC-8).

=== Group A ===
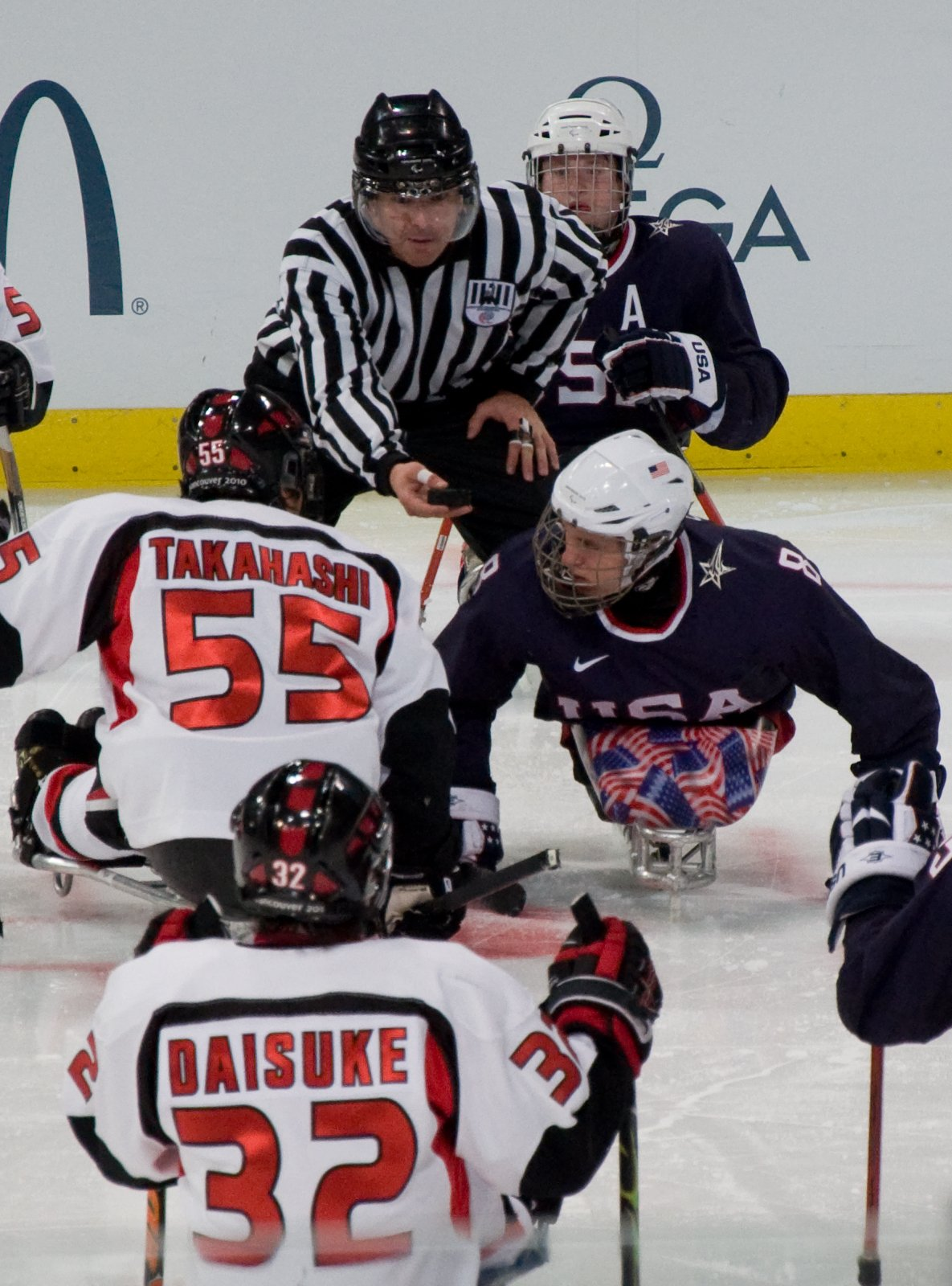
United States vs Japan. Group round, Group A, March 16, 2010.

Pos	Team	Pld	W	OTW	OTL	L	GF	GA	GD	Pts	Qualification
1	United States	3	3	0	0	0	14	0	+14	9	Semifinals
2	Japan	3	2	0	0	1	7	7	0	6	Semifinals
3	Czech Republic	3	1	0	0	2	5	7	−2	3	5–8th place semifinals
4	South Korea	3	0	0	0	3	2	14	−12	0	5–8th place semifinals

Source: Vancouver 2010

13 March 2010; 17:00	United States	5–0 (1–0, 2–0, 2–0)	South Korea	UBC Thunderbird Arena, Vancouver; Attendance: 5,444

Game reference

Steve Cash
Goalies
Choi Hyuk-jun
Referee:
(Canada) Paul Boese
Linesmen:
(Norway) Steven Richardson
(Estonia) Maksim Toode

Chace (Landeros, Shaw) – 03:45	1–0
Salamone (Howard) (PP) – 19:45	2–0
Lipsett (Yohe, Salamone) (PP) – 29:34	3–0
Lipsett – 38:32	4–0
Chace – 44:22	5–0

12 min
Penalties
10 min
21
Shots
5

13 March 2010; 20:30	Japan	2–1 (0–0, 1–0, 1–1)	Czech Republic	UBC Thunderbird Arena, Vancouver; Attendance: 2,752

Game reference

Mitsuru Nagase
Goalies
Michal Vápenka
Referee:
(Norway) Petter Vojan Hegle
Linesmen:
(United States) William Marcotte
(United States) Brad Anton Roethlisberger

Endo (Sudo, Takahashi) – 15:11	1–0
	1–1	33:06 – Hábl (Kvoch, Geier)
Ishida (Uehara) – 38:19	2–1

8 min
Penalties
4 min
18
Shots
9

14 March 2010; 17:00	Czech Republic	0–3 (0–1, 0–1, 0–1)	United States	UBC Thunderbird Arena, Vancouver; Attendance: 5,170

Game reference

Michal Vápenka
Goalies
Steve Cash
Referee:
(Canada) Paul Matte
Linesmen:
(Canada) Eric Dagenais
(Norway) Kai Gunnar Thøger-Andresen

0–1	07:53 – Lipsett (Salamone, Chace) (PP)
0–2	27:01 – Salamone
0–3	33:44 – Connelly (Yohe, Howard) (PP)

6 min
Penalties
12 min
6
Shots
23

14 March 2010; 20:30	Japan	5–0 (3–0, 0–0, 2–0)	South Korea	UBC Thunderbird Arena, Vancouver; Attendance: 3,941

Game reference

Mitsuru Nagase
Goalies
Choi Hyuk-jun
Chung Young-hoon
Referee:
(United States) Johnathan Morrison
Linesmen:
(Poland) Tomasz Heltman
(United States) Brad Anton Roethlisberger

Uehara (Endo, Sudo) (SH) – 04:46	1–0
Yoshikawa (Takahashi, Ishida) – 06:21	2–0
Endo (Yoshikawa, Uehara) – 07:41	3–0
Yoshikawa (Uehara, Takahashi) (PP) – 32:52	4–0
Takahashi (Yoshikawa) – 34:21	5–0

26 min
Penalties
8 min
25
Shots
11

16 March 2010; 10:00	Czech Republic	4–2 (2–0, 2–0, 0–2)	South Korea	UBC Thunderbird Arena, Vancouver; Attendance: 4,791

Game reference

Jan Matoušek
Goalies
Choi Hyuk-jun
Chung Young-hoon
Referee:
(United States) Scott Bokal
Linesmen:
(United States) Brian Frerichs
(Estonia) Maksim Toode

Krupička (SH) – 02:29	1–0
Kvoch (Hábl, Geier) (PP2) – 14:11	2–0
Kubeš (Geier) – 20:28	3–0
Fojtík – 26:18	4–0
	4–1	41:46 – Cho B. (Lee J., Park S.) (PP)
	4–2	44:51 – Lee J. (Cho B.)

14 min
Penalties
12 min
21
Shots
7

16 March 2010; 17:00	United States	6–0 (2–0, 2–0, 2–0)	Japan	UBC Thunderbird Arena, Vancouver; Attendance: 5,468

Game reference

Steve Cash
Mike Blabac
Goalies
Mitsuru Nagase
Shinobu Fukushima
Referee:
(Norway) Petter Vojan Hegle
Linesmen:
(Netherlands) Lodewijk Beelen
(Canada) Eric Dagenais

Page (Yohe, Jones) – 01:05	1–0
Shaw (Lipsett) – 12:01	2–0
Salamone (Yohe) (PP) – 20:13	3–0
Lipsett – 28:22	4–0
Howard (Chace) – 34:10	5–0
Landeros – 38:54	6–0

8 min
Penalties
6 min
19
Shots
6

=== Group B ===
Pos	Team	Pld	W	OTW	OTL	L	GF	GA	GD	Pts	Qualification
1	Canada (H)	3	3	0	0	0	19	1	+18	9	Semifinals
2	Norway	3	1	1	0	1	4	7	−3	5	Semifinals
3	Sweden	3	1	0	1	1	3	12	−9	4	5–8th place semifinals
4	Italy	3	0	0	0	3	1	7	−6	0	5–8th place semifinals

Source: Vancouver 2010
(H) Host

13 March 2010; 10:00	Canada	4–0 (1–0, 0–0, 3–0)	Italy	UBC Thunderbird Arena, Vancouver

Game reference

Paul Rosen
Goalies
Santino Stillitano
Referee:
(United States) Johnathan Morrison
Linesmen:
(Netherlands) Lodewijk Beelen
(Norway) Kai Gunnar Thøger-Andresen

Dorion (Bridges) – 09:28	1–0
Westlake (Dixon, Labonté)– 34:04	2–0
Westlake (Bowden) – 38:48	3–0
Labonté – 39:18	4–0

8 min
Penalties
10 min
16
Shots
4

13 March 2010; 13:30	Norway	2–1 GWS (0–1, 0–0, 1–0) (OT: 0–0) (SO: 1–0)	Sweden	UBC Thunderbird Arena, Vancouver; Attendance: 5,458

Game reference
Roger Johansen	Goalies	Ulf Nilsson	Referee: (United States) Derek Berkebile; Linesmen: (Poland) Tomasz Heltman (Czech Republic) Leon Wesley
/ 0–1 / 14:16 – Holm (Anderson, Ingvarsson); Rovelstad (Pedersen, Svee) (PP) – 43:17 / 1–1			Referee: (United States) Derek Berkebile; Linesmen: (Poland) Tomasz Heltman (Czech Republic) Leon Wesley
Pedersen; Bjørnstad; Rovelstad	Shootout	Kasperi; Ingvarsson; (miss) Holm	Referee: (United States) Derek Berkebile; Linesmen: (Poland) Tomasz Heltman (Czech Republic) Leon Wesley
2 min	Penalties	6 min	Referee: (United States) Derek Berkebile; Linesmen: (Poland) Tomasz Heltman (Czech Republic) Leon Wesley
24	Shots	8	Referee: (United States) Derek Berkebile; Linesmen: (Poland) Tomasz Heltman (Czech Republic) Leon Wesley

14 March 2010; 10:30	Norway	2–1 (0–1, 0–0, 2–0)	Italy	UBC Thunderbird Arena, Vancouver; Attendance: 3,638

Game reference

Roger Johansen
Goalies
Santino Stillitano
Referee:
(Canada) Paul Boese
Linesmen:
(United States) Brian Frerichs
(Estonia) Maksim Toode

	0–1	08:34 – Winkler (Planker)
Røyne (Bjørnstad) – 37:59	1–1
Røyne (Bjørnstad, Rovelstad) – 43:59	2–1

0 min
Penalties
6 min
18
Shots
10

14 March 2010; 13:30	Canada	10–1 (4–1, 4–0, 2–0)	Sweden	UBC Thunderbird Arena, Vancouver; Attendance: 5,504

Game reference

Benoit St-Amand
Goalies
Ulf Nilsson
Referee:
(United States) Scott Bokal
Linesmen:
(Norway) Steven Richardson
(Czech Republic) Leon Wesley

Bowden (Nicholson, Westlake) – 01:25	1–0
	1–1	01:38 – Ingvarsson
Westlake (Nicholson, Bowden) – 07:44	2–1
Dixon (Bridges) – 12:54	3–1
Bowden (Bridges, Westlake) – 13:47	4–1
Westlake (Dixon, Bridges) (PP) – 17:13	5–1
Dixon (Bowden, Bridges) (PP) – 22:16	6–1
Westlake (SH2) – 25:28	7–1
Dorion (SH) – 26:23	8–1
Dorion (Nicholson) – 31:19	9–1
Dorion – 34:58	10–1

20 min
Penalties
6 min
32
Shots
3

16 March 2010; 13:30	Italy	0–1 (0–0, 0–1, 0–0)	Sweden	UBC Thunderbird Arena, Vancouver; Attendance: 4,983

Game reference
Santino Stillitano	Goalies	Ulf Nilsson	Referee: (Canada) Paul Matte; Linesmen: (United States) William Marcotte (Norway) Kai Gunnar Thøger-Andresen
0–1 / 27:57 – Holm (Anderson) (PP2)			Referee: (Canada) Paul Matte; Linesmen: (United States) William Marcotte (Norway) Kai Gunnar Thøger-Andresen
8 min	Penalties	8 min	Referee: (Canada) Paul Matte; Linesmen: (United States) William Marcotte (Norway) Kai Gunnar Thøger-Andresen
6	Shots	12	Referee: (Canada) Paul Matte; Linesmen: (United States) William Marcotte (Norway) Kai Gunnar Thøger-Andresen

16 March 2010; 20:30	Norway	0–5 (0–2, 0–3, 0–0)	Canada	UBC Thunderbird Arena, Vancouver; Attendance: 5,430

Game reference

Roger Johansen
Kissinger Deng
Goalies
Paul Rosen
Referee:
(United States) Derek Berkebile
Linesmen:
(Poland) Tomasz Heltman
(United States) Brad Anton Roethlisberger

0–1	00:31 – Bridges (Dixon, Bowden) (PP)
0–2	07:14 – Westlake (Bowden) (SH)
0–3	15:11 – Bowden (Murray, Westlake)
0–4	18:46 – Westlake (Bowden, Bridges) (PP)
0–5	26:04 – Dixon (Labonté, Nicholson) (PP)

16 min
Penalties
10 min
8
Shots
12

== Classification round ==
=== Bracket ===
5–8th place semifinal
17 March
Czech Republic (GWS)	3
Italy	2
17 March
Sweden	1
South Korea	2

Fifth place game
19 March
Czech Republic (OT)	2
South Korea	1
Seventh place game
19 March
Italy	4
Sweden	0

=== 5–8th place semifinals ===
17 March 2010; 12:00	Czech Republic	3–2 GWS (1–0, 1–2, 0–0) (OT: 0–0) (SO: 1–0)	Italy	UBC Thunderbird Arena, Vancouver; Attendance: 5,092

Game reference

Michal Vápenka
Goalies
Santino Stillitano
Referee:
(United States) Derek Berkebile
Linesmen:
(United States) William Marcotte
(Estonia) Maksim Toode

Geier (PP) – 09:51	1–0
Krupička (Kvoch, Šafránek) (PP) – 18:21	2–0
	2–1	21:19 – Rosa (Planker, Cavaliere) (PP)
	2–2	29:17 – Chiarotti (Planker, Rosa) (PP)

Fojtík
Berger (miss)
Shootout
(miss) Rosa
(miss) Planker
(miss) Cavaliere
12 min
Penalties
12 min
15
Shots
15

17 March 2010; 19:00	Sweden	1–2 (0–1, 1–0, 0–1)	South Korea	UBC Thunderbird Arena, Vancouver; Attendance: 5,354

Game reference

Ulf Nilsson
Goalies
Chung Young-hoon
Referee:
(Norway) Petter Vojan Hegle
Linesmen:
(United States) Brian Frerichs
(Czech Republic) Leon Wesley

	0–1	09:27 – Cho Y. (Jang J., Lee H.)
Rakos – 15:51	1–1
	1–2	33:45 – Lee J. (Park S., Lee Y.)

4 min
Penalties
6 min
11
Shots
12

=== Seventh place game ===
19 March 2010; 12:00	Italy	4–0 (2–0, 0–0, 2–0)	Sweden	UBC Thunderbird Arena, Vancouver; Attendance: 4,954

Game reference

Santino Stillitano
Goalies
Ulf Nilsson
Referee:
(Canada) Paul Matte
Linesmen:
(Netherlands) Lodewijk Beelen
(Czech Republic) Leon Wesley

Winkler – 07:56	1–0
Planker (Rosa, Cavaliere) (PP) – 13:25	2–0
Planker (Leperdi) – 39:23	3–0
Chiarotti (Planker, Cavaliere) – 41:01	4–0

4 min
Penalties
4 min
17
Shots
13

=== Fifth place game ===
19 March 2010; 15:30	Czech Republic	2–1 OT (0–0, 0–0, 1–1) (OT: 1–0)	South Korea	UBC Thunderbird Arena, Vancouver; Attendance: 5,507

Game reference

Michal Vápenka
Goalies
Choi Hyuk-jun
Referee:
(United States) Scott Bokal
Linesmen:
(Canada) Eric Dagenais
(Poland) Tomasz Heltman

	0–1	32:59 – Park S. (Lee J., Han)
Fojtík (Kubeš, Krupička) – 37:24	1–1
Geier (Kvoch, Fojtík) – 47:16	2–1

8 min
Penalties
6 min
20
Shots
16

== Medal round ==
=== Bracket ===
Semifinals
18 March
United States	3
Norway	0
18 March
Canada	1
Japan	3

Gold medal game
20 March
United States	2
Japan	0
Bronze medal game
19 March
Norway	2
Canada	1

=== Semifinals ===
18 March 2010; 12:00	Canada	1–3 (1–0, 0–1, 0–2)	Japan	UBC Thunderbird Arena, Vancouver; Attendance: 5,039

Game reference

Paul Rosen
Goalies
Mitsuru Nagase
Referee:
(United States) Johnathan Morrison
Linesmen:
(Norway) Steven Richardson
(United States) Brad Anton Roethlisberger

Dorion (Booker, Grassi) (PP) – 09:56	1–0
	1–1	22:33 – Endo
	1–2	43:47 – Uehara (Takahashi)
	1–3	44:44 – Endo (ENG)

12 min
Penalties
6 min
20
Shots
11

18 March 2010; 19:00	United States	3–0 (0–0, 2–0, 1–0)	Norway	UBC Thunderbird Arena, Vancouver; Attendance: 5,204

Game reference

Steve Cash
Goalies
Roger Johansen
Referee:
(Canada) Paul Boese
Linesmen:
(Canada) Eric Dagenais
(Poland) Tomasz Heltman

Shaw (Pauls) – 23:48	1–0
Chace (Salamone) (PP) – 25:35	2–0
Howard (Landeros, Salamone) – 41:59	3–0

4 min
Penalties
8 min
10
Shots
12

=== Bronze medal game ===
19 March 2010; 19:00	Norway	2–1 (0–0, 0–0, 2–1)	Canada	UBC Thunderbird Arena, Vancouver; Attendance: 5,462

Game reference

Roger Johansen
Goalies
Paul Rosen
Referee:
(United States) Johnathan Morrison
Linesmen:
(United States) Brian Frerichs
(United States) Brad Anton Roethlisberger

	0–1	32:45 – Dixon (Westlake)
Pedersen (PS) – 36:08	1–1
Hagen – 44:56	2–1

10 min
Penalties
6 min
12
Shots
18

=== Gold medal game ===
20 March 2010; 12:00	United States	2–0 (1–0, 0–0, 1–0)	Japan	UBC Thunderbird Arena, Vancouver; Attendance: 5,810

Game reference
Steve Cash	Goalies	Mitsuru Nagase	Referee: (Norway) Petter Vojan Hegle; Linesmen: (Norway) Steven Richardson (Estonia) Maksim Toode
Salamone (Howard, Lipsett) (PP) – 04:10 / 1–0; Lipsett (Howard) (PP) – 43:42 / 2–0			Referee: (Norway) Petter Vojan Hegle; Linesmen: (Norway) Steven Richardson (Estonia) Maksim Toode
6 min	Penalties	6 min	Referee: (Norway) Petter Vojan Hegle; Linesmen: (Norway) Steven Richardson (Estonia) Maksim Toode
16	Shots	5	Referee: (Norway) Petter Vojan Hegle; Linesmen: (Norway) Steven Richardson (Estonia) Maksim Toode

== Final ranking ==
Pos	Grp	Team	Pld	W	OTW	OTL	L	GF	GA	GD	Pts
1st place, gold medalist(s)	A	United States	5	5	0	0	0	19	0	+19	15
2nd place, silver medalist(s)	A	Japan	5	3	0	0	2	10	10	0	9
3rd place, bronze medalist(s)	B	Norway	5	2	1	0	2	6	11	−5	8
4	B	Canada (H)	5	3	0	0	2	21	6	+15	9
5	A	Czech Republic	5	1	2	0	2	10	10	0	7
6	A	South Korea	5	1	0	1	3	5	17	−12	4
7	B	Italy	5	1	0	1	3	7	10	−3	4
8	B	Sweden	5	1	0	1	3	4	18	−14	4

(H) Host

== Statistics ==
=== Scoring leaders ===
List shows the top ten skaters sorted by points, then goals.

Player	GP	G	A	Pts	+/−	PIM	POS
(Canada) Greg Westlake	5	7	4	11	+8	4	F
(Canada) Brad Bowden	5	3	6	9	+7	0	F
(United States) Alexi Salamone	5	4	4	8	+5	6	F
(United States) Taylor Lipsett	5	5	2	7	+8	6	F
(Canada) Adam Dixon	5	4	3	7	+8	2	D
(Canada) Billy Bridges	5	1	6	7	+3	16	F
(United States) Joe Howard	5	2	4	6	+5	6	F
(Italy) Florian Planker	5	2	4	6	0	8	F
(Canada) Marc Dorion	5	5	0	5	+1	4	F
(Japan) Takayuki Endo	5	4	1	5	+4	2	D

GP = Games played; G = Goals; A = Assists; Pts = Points; +/− = Plus/minus; PIM = Penalties in minutes; POS = Position
Source: Vancouver 2010

=== Leading goaltenders ===
Only the top five goaltenders, based on save percentage, who have played at least 40% of their team's minutes, are included in this list.

Player	TOI	GA	GAA	SA	Sv%	SO
(United States) Steve Cash	210:00	0	0.00	33	100.00	4
(South Korea) Chung Young-hoon	97:19	3	1.39	35	91.43	0
(Czech Republic) Michal Vápenka	191:24	8	1.88	72	88.89	0
(Canada) Paul Rosen	179:19	4	1.00	34	88.24	2
(Japan) Mitsuru Nagase	213:40	9	1.90	71	87.32	1

TOI = Time on ice (minutes:seconds); GA = Goals against; GAA = Goals against average; SA = Shots against; Sv% = Save percentage; SO = Shutouts
Source: Vancouver 2010

== Awards ==
- Best players selected by the directorate:
  - Best Goaltender: (United States) Steve Cash
  - Best Defenceman: (United States) Taylor Chace
  - Best Forward: (Canada) Greg Westlake
  - MVP: (Canada) Brad Bowden
- Media All-Stars:
  - Goaltender: (United States) Steve Cash
  - Defencemen: (United States) Taylor Chace / (Canada) Adam Dixon
  - Forwards: (Canada) Greg Westlake / (United States) Alexi Salamone / (Italy) Florian Planker
  - MVP: (Canada) Brad Bowden

== See also ==
- Ice hockey at the 2010 Winter Olympics
