= Naohiko =

- Gender: Male

Origin
- Origin: Japanese
- Meaning: Different meanings depending on the kanji used

Naohiko (written: 直彦 "honest, prince") is a masculine Japanese given name. Notable people with the name include:

- Naohiko Ishida (石田 真彦; born 1967), Japanese ice sledge hockey player
- Naohiko Minobe (美濃部 直彦; born 1965), Japanese footballer and manager
