= Benoit St-Amand =

Canadian ice sledge hockey player

Benoît St-Amand
- Born: April 19, 1978 (age 48) Montreal, Quebec, Canada
- Height: 5 ft 10 in (178 cm)
- Weight: 165 lb (75 kg; 11 st 11 lb)
- Position: Goalie
- National team: Canada
- Playing career: 2004–present
Medal record
Para ice hockey
Representing Canada
Paralympic Games
Gold medal – first place	2006 Torino	Team
Bronze medal – third place	2014 Sochi	Team
World Championships
Gold medal – first place	2008 Marlborough	Team
Gold medal – first place	2013 Goyang	Team
Bronze medal – third place	2009 Ostrava	Team
Bronze medal – third place	2012 Hamar	Team

Benoît St-Amand (born 19 April 1978) is a Canadian ice sledge hockey player. He had a bone cancer in his right leg when he was 15 (1993), and his leg was amputated above the knee in 1995.

Born in Montreal, Quebec, St-Amand, began to play ice sledge hockey immediately after the 2002 Winter Paralympics, where he saw the Canadian national team, and made his debut for the national team just two years later (in 2004) - first as a forward, then as a goalie.

== Honours ==
- 2010 Winter Paralympics
  - 4th place
- 2009 IPC Ice Sledge Hockey World Championships
  - Bronze
- 2008 IPC Ice Sledge Hockey World Championships
  - Gold
- 2006 Winter Paralympics
  - Gold
