= Matt Cook (sledge hockey) =

Canadian ice sledge hockey player

Matthew Cook
- Born: November 10, 1987 Edmonton, Alberta, Canada
- Died: April 4, 2010 (aged 22) Edmonton, Alberta, Canada
- Height: 6 ft 2 in (188 cm)
- Position: Left Wing
- Playing career: 2008–2010
Medal record
Men's para ice hockey
Representing Canada
World Championships
Bronze medal – third place	2009 Ostrava	Team

Matthew Cook (November 10, 1987 – April 4, 2010) was a Canadian ice sledge hockey player.

Before the age of 18, Cook played Junior A for the Bonnyville Pontiacs of the Alberta Junior Hockey League. He had his leg amputated below the knee in 2006, at the age of 18, after unsuccessful chemotherapy when doctors discovered cancer in his left leg. Cook began playing ice sledge hockey in 2007, at a Team Alberta Summer development camp.

Cook was a member of the Canada men's national ice sledge hockey team, first making the team in September 2008. He won bronze with them in the 2009 World Championships.

He was expected to participate in the 2010 Paralympic Winter Games in Vancouver, but the cancer returned in the summer of 2009, and after surgery, and recovery, the bone cancer returned, and he died on April 4, 2010.
