= Christopher Manns =

American ice sledge hockey player

Chris Manns
Personal information
- Full name: Christopher Manns
- Nationality: United States
- Born: June 30, 1980 (age 46) Buffalo, New York, U.S.
Medal record
Men's para ice hockey
Representing United States
Paralympic Games
Gold medal – first place	2002 Salt Lake City	Team competition
Bronze medal – third place	2006 Turin	Team competition
World Championships
Gold medal – first place	2009 Ostrava	Team competition
Bronze medal – third place	2008 Marlborough	Team competition

Christopher Manns (born June 30, 1980) is an American former ice sledge hockey player. He won medals with Team USA at the 2002 Winter Paralympics and 2006 Winter Paralympics.
