= Mike Blabac (sledge hockey) =

American ice sledge hockey player

Personal information
- Born: January 18, 1974 (age 52)
Medal record
Men's para ice hockey
Representing United States
Paralympic Games
Gold medal – first place	2010 Vancouver	Team competition
World Championships
Gold medal – first place	2009 Ostrava	Team competition
Bronze medal – third place	2008 Marlborough	Team competition

Mike Blabac (born January 18, 1974) is an ice sledge hockey player from United States who has competed at the Winter Paralympics. He plays as a goaltender. Blabac was diagnosed with multiple sclerosis in 2001.

In 2008 he played for the United States as they won third-place in the World Sledge Hockey Challenge.

He took part in the 2010 Winter Paralympics in Vancouver, where USA won gold. They beat Japan 2–0 in the final.
