= Kissinger Deng =

Norwegian ice sledge hockey player

Personal information
- Born: 31 May 1979 (age 47) Nyala, Sudan
Medal record
Men's para ice hockey
Representing Norway
Paralympic Games
| Bronze medal – third place | 2010 Vancouver | Team competition |
World Championships
| Silver medal – second place | 2009 Ostrava | Team competition |

Kissinger Deng (born 31 May 1979) is a Norwegian ice sledge hockey player. He is a goaltender, and currently plays for Oslo KHK. He was on the bronze medal team at the 2010 Paralympics and was originally from Sudan.

== Titles ==
- 2009
  - Silver at 2009 World Championships
  - Gold at Malmø Open
