= Bubba Torres =

American ice sledge hockey player

Personal information
- Full name: Michael Torres
- Nationality: United States
- Born: October 31, 1991 (age 34) Philadelphia, Pennsylvania, U.S.
Medal record
Men's para ice hockey
Representing United States
Paralympic Games
Gold medal – first place	2010 Vancouver	Team competition
World Championships
Gold medal – first place	2009 Ostrava	Team competition
Bronze medal – third place	2008 Marlborough	Team competition

Michael "Bubba" Torres (born October 31, 1991) is an ice sledge hockey player and Paralympic gold medalist. Competing at the 2010 Winter Paralympics, he won a gold medal in the men's ice sledge hockey tournament.
