= Steve Cook (skier) =

American Paralympic skier and cyclist (born 1968)

Steve Cook (born July 11, 1968) is an American former amateur skier and ski coach.

Cook won seven Paralympic Games medals, seven Disabled World Championship medals and the Disabled World Cup Overall during an 11-year period.

In 2016, Cook was inducted into the Alf Engen Ski Museum Hall of Fame.

== Biography ==
Born in New Hampshire, Cook lost his right leg in 1988 in a farming accident. After his recovery, Cook decided to become a competitive skier.

In 2002, Cook won a U.S. record four medals (all silver) in cross country skiing during the 2002 Paralympic Winter Games in Salt Lake City. In 2005 he won two gold medals and a bronze to win the Disabled World Cup title at Fort Kent, Maine, in the Disabled World Championships that doubled as World Cup races.

At the 2006 Paralympic Winter Games in Torino, Italy, Cook won two gold medals and a silver.

In 2007, Cook retired from racing. Working at the National Ability Center in Park City, Utah, Cook helped develop a Nordic skiing program for disabled athletes. He later worked with the Park City Junior Nordic Ski Team. In 2014, Cook became Head Coach and Junior Program Director of the Utah Nordic Alliance.

Cook is a resident of Salt Lake City, Utah.
