= Greg Shaw (sledge hockey) =

American ice sledge hockey player

Personal information
- Born: Gregory Mathew Shaw; February 28, 1990 (age 36) Cape Canaveral, Florida, U.S.
- Years active: 1985–present

Sport
- Country: USA
- Sport: Ice sledge hockey
- Team: Tampa Bay Lightning

Achievements and titles
- Paralympic finals: 2010 and 2014
Medal record
Para ice hockey
Representing United States
Paralympic Games
Gold medal – first place	2010 Vancouver	Team competition
Gold medal – first place	2014 Sochi	Team competition
World Championships
Gold medal – first place	2009 Ostrava	Team competition
Bronze medal – third place	2008 Marlborough	Team competition

Greg Shaw (born February 28, 1990) is an American ice sledge hockey player.

Shaw took part in the 2010 and 2014 Winter Paralympics, winning gold on both occasions.
