= Jimmy Connelly =

American ice sledge hockey player

Personal information
- Nationality: American
- Born: October 27, 1989 (age 36)
Medal record
Men's para ice hockey
Representing United States
Paralympic Games
Gold medal – first place	2010 Vancouver	Team competition
Bronze medal – third place	2006 Turin	Team competition
World Championships
Gold medal – first place	2012 Hamar	Team competition
Gold medal – first place	2009 Ostrava	Team competition
Bronze medal – third place	2008 Marlborough	Team competition

Jimmy Connelly (born October 27, 1989) is an ice sledge hockey player from the United States.

He took part in the 2010 Winter Paralympic Games in Vancouver, where the United States won gold. They beat Japan 2–0 in the final.
