= Loyd Remi Johansen =

Norwegian sledge hockey player

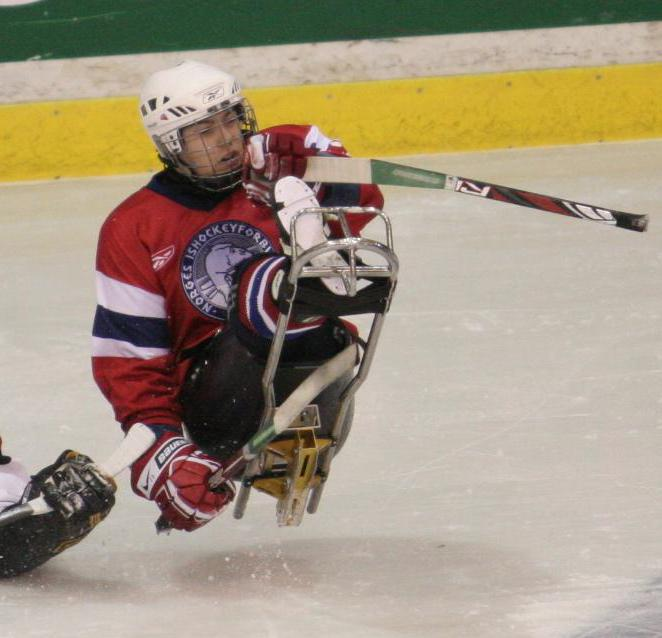
- Johansen in 2009

Personal information
- Born: July 25, 1987 (age 38)
Medal record
Men's para ice hockey
Representing Norway
Winter Paralympic Games
Silver medal – second place	2006 Turin	Team competition
Bronze medal – third place	2010 Vancouver	Team competition
World Championships
Silver medal – second place	2009 Ostrava	Team competition
European Championships
Bronze medal – third place	2011 Sollefteå	Team competition

Loyd Remi Johansen (born July 25, 1987) is an ice sledge hockey player from Norway. Also known as Loyd Remi Pallander Solberg, he was on the silver medal-winning team at the 2006 Winter Paralympics, as well as the bronze medal-winning team at the 2010 Winter Paralympics.
