= Chung Young-hoon =

South Korean cyclist (born 1973)

Personal information
- Born: 5 April 1973 (age 53)

Cycling career
- Sport: Cycling

Chung Young-hoon (born 5 April 1973) is a South Korean cyclist. He competed in the men's team pursuit at the 1996 Summer Olympics.
