= Tomohiko Maruo =

Japanese ice sledge hockey player

Personal information
- Native name: 円尾智彦
- Born: March 7, 1968 (age 58) Kobe, Hyōgo, Japan
- Height: 1.70 m (5 ft 7 in)
- Weight: 70 kg (154 lb)

Sport
- Sport: Ice sledge hockey
- Position: Forward
- Disability: Amputee (since 1986)
- Team: Nagano Thunderbirds
Medal record
Men's para ice hockey
Representing Japan
Paralympic Games
Silver medal – second place	2010 Vancouver	Team

Tomohiko Maruo (円尾智彦, Maruo Tomohiko; born 7 March 1968 in Kobe, Hyōgo Prefecture) is a Japanese ice sledge hockey player. He was part of the Japanese sledge hockey team that won a silver medal at the 2010 Winter Paralympics.

His left leg was amputated above the knee following a traffic accident at age 18.
