= Shawn Matheson =

Canadian ice sledge hockey player

Personal information
- Nationality: Canada
- Born: May 6, 1972 (age 54) Chatham, New Brunswick, Canada
Medal record
Men's ice hockey
Representing Canada
Paralympic Games
Gold medal – first place	2006 Torino	Team
Silver medal – second place	1998 Nagano	Team
Bronze medal – third place	1994 Lillehammer	Team
World Championships
Bronze medal – third place	2009 Ostrava	Team

Shawn Matheson (born May 6, 1972) is a former Canadian ice sledge hockey player. He won medals with Team Canada at the 1994 Winter Paralympics, 1998 Winter Paralympics and 2006 Winter Paralympics. He also competed in the 2002 Winter Paralympics and 2010 Winter Paralympics.

Shawn is married to Miki Matsue Matheson. They met at the 1998 Winter Paralympics in Nagano, Japan. Together they have two sons and live in the Ottawa Area (Ontario, Canada).

He is the great, great-grandson of John Mercer Johnson, one of Canada's Fathers of Confederation.
