= Alexi Salamone =

American ice sledge hockey player

Personal information
- Born: 17 June 1987 (age 39) Bryansk, Soviet Union
Medal record
Men's para ice hockey
Representing United States
Paralympic Games
Gold medal – first place	2010 Vancouver	Team competition
Bronze medal – third place	2006 Turin	Team competition
World Championships
Bronze medal – third place	2008 Marlborough	Team competition

Alexi Salamone (born 17 June 1987 in Bryansk, Russia, Soviet Union) is a Paralympian ice sledge hockey player from the United States.

== Early life ==
Salamone was born near Chernobyl, the site of a nuclear accident that took place 14 months prior to his birth. He was born with deformed legs, both of which were amputated at the Children's Institute of Prosthetics in Moscow when he was four years old. Orphaned, he was adopted by the Salamones, a couple from Buffalo, New York, and moved to the United States at the age of six.

== Ice sledge hockey ==
Salamone was introduced to ice sports by the Skating Association for the Blind and Handicapped (S.A.B.A.H.). He has been a member of the U.S. national sledge hockey team since 2003, twice representing his country at the Winter Paralympics.

At the 2006 Winter Paralympics in Turin, Italy, Salamone was part of the American team that won the bronze medal. The United States featured in Group B of the tournament and won two of their three group games; 3–0 against Japan and 6–1 over Sweden. A 1–2 defeat in the match against Germany meant the USA faced Group A winners Norway in the semi-finals. The team lost that match 2–4 but went on to beat Germany 4–3 in the bronze medal match.

As a part of the United States national team he won a bronze medal at the 2008 IPC Ice Sledge Hockey World Championships, held in Marlborough, USA and won a gold medal at the 2009 Ice Sledge Hockey World Championships in Ostrava, Czech Republic.

In 2010 he competed at his second Winter Paralympics in Vancouver, where USA won gold. They beat Japan 2–0 in the final. Salamone scored the first goal in the final and overall had four goals and four assists in five matches.

He was not selected for the 2014 Paralympic Games.
