= Joe Howard (sledge hockey) =

American ice sledge hockey player

- Born: May 22, 1966 (age 60) Boston, Massachusetts, USA
- Position: Forward
- National team: United States
- Playing career: 1996–2010

Joe Howard
Medal record

Representing United States

Ice sledge hockey

Paralympic Games
Gold medal – first place	2002 Winter Paralympics	Tournament
Gold medal – first place	2010 Vancouver	Tournament
Bronze medal – third place	2006 Winter Paralympics	Tournament

Joseph "Momo" Howard (born 22 May 1966 in Boston, Massachusetts) is an ice sledge hockey player from United States. Howard lost both of his legs at the age of 15. In 1982, he was introduced to ice sledge hockey, and competed in his first Winter Paralympics at the 1998. At those games, the USA came in seventh place but Howard set a record with six goals in one match. At the 2002 Winter Paralympics, Howard contributed with three points in a 5–1 defeat of Canada. In the gold medal game, After an overtime shootout victory, the Americans prevailed defeating defending champions Norway 4–3. Going undefeated (6-0), outscoring opponents 26–6 in the tournament. Joe was named MVP of the gold medal game. Scoring three goals and adding one assist. He was named a first team all-star. Howard's hard-fought first-place finish was extra special. He fulfilled a promise he made to his mother, who was unable to attend as she was ill with cancer, by winning the Gold. Following the USA's victory over Estonia, he proposed to his girlfriend of five years Carol Tribuna on the center of the rink. He took part in the 2010 Winter Paralympics in Vancouver, where USA won gold. Going undefeated and not allowing a goal during the tournament, outscoring their opponents 19–0, They beat Japan 2–0 in the final. Howard had both assists, and helped earn his second Paralympic Gold Medal

== Awards and honors ==
- 2024: Inducted into United States Hockey Hall of Fame
- 2022:Inducted into the Olympic/Paralympic Hall of Fame
- 2010: Gold Medal - Vancouver 2010 Paralympics
- 2006: Bronze Medal - Torino, Italy 2006 Paralympics, Team Captain, First Team All Star
- 2004: Silver medal - World Championships, Ornskoldsvik Sweden, Team Captain, First Team All Star
- 2002: Gold medal - Salt Lake City 2002 Paralympics - Team Captain, Game MVP, Team MVP, First Team AllStar
- 2002: Inducted into Massachusetts Hockey Hall of Fame
- 2002: USA Hockey Bob Johnson Award recipient
- 2002: Olympic Spirit Award recipient
- 2002: New England Wheelchair Athletic Association Athlete of the year
- 2002: Olympic Spirit Award recipient
- 2000: Captain of U.S. National Sled Hockey Team
- 1998: Paralympic record six goals in single game (double hat trick)
- 1998: Paralympic Games, Nagano Japan
- 1997: Swedish Winter Games, Soleftea Sweden
