= Tim Jones (sledge hockey) =

American ice sledge hockey player

Personal information
- Born: December 16, 1987 (age 38)
Medal record
Men's para ice hockey
Representing United States
Paralympic Games
Gold medal – first place	2010 Vancouver	Team competition
World Championships
Gold medal – first place	2009 Ostrava	Team competition

Tim Jones (born December 16, 1987) is an ice sledge hockey player from United States.

He took part in the 2010 Winter Paralympics in Vancouver, where USA won gold. They beat Japan 2–0 in the final.
