= Park Woo-chul =

South Korean sledge hockey player

Park Woo-Chul
Personal information
- Nationality: South Korea
- Born: 4 April 1973 (age 53)
Medal record
Men's para ice hockey
Representing South Korea
World Championships
Silver medal – second place	2012 Hamar	Team competition
Bronze medal – third place	2017 Gangneung	Team competition

Park Woo-Chul (Korean: 박우철, born 4 April 1973) is a South Korean ice sledge hockey player. He played in the 2010 and 2014 Paralympic Winter Games. He won a silver medal at the 2012 IPC Ice Sledge Hockey World Championships.
