= Steve Cash (sledge hockey) =

American ice sledge hockey player

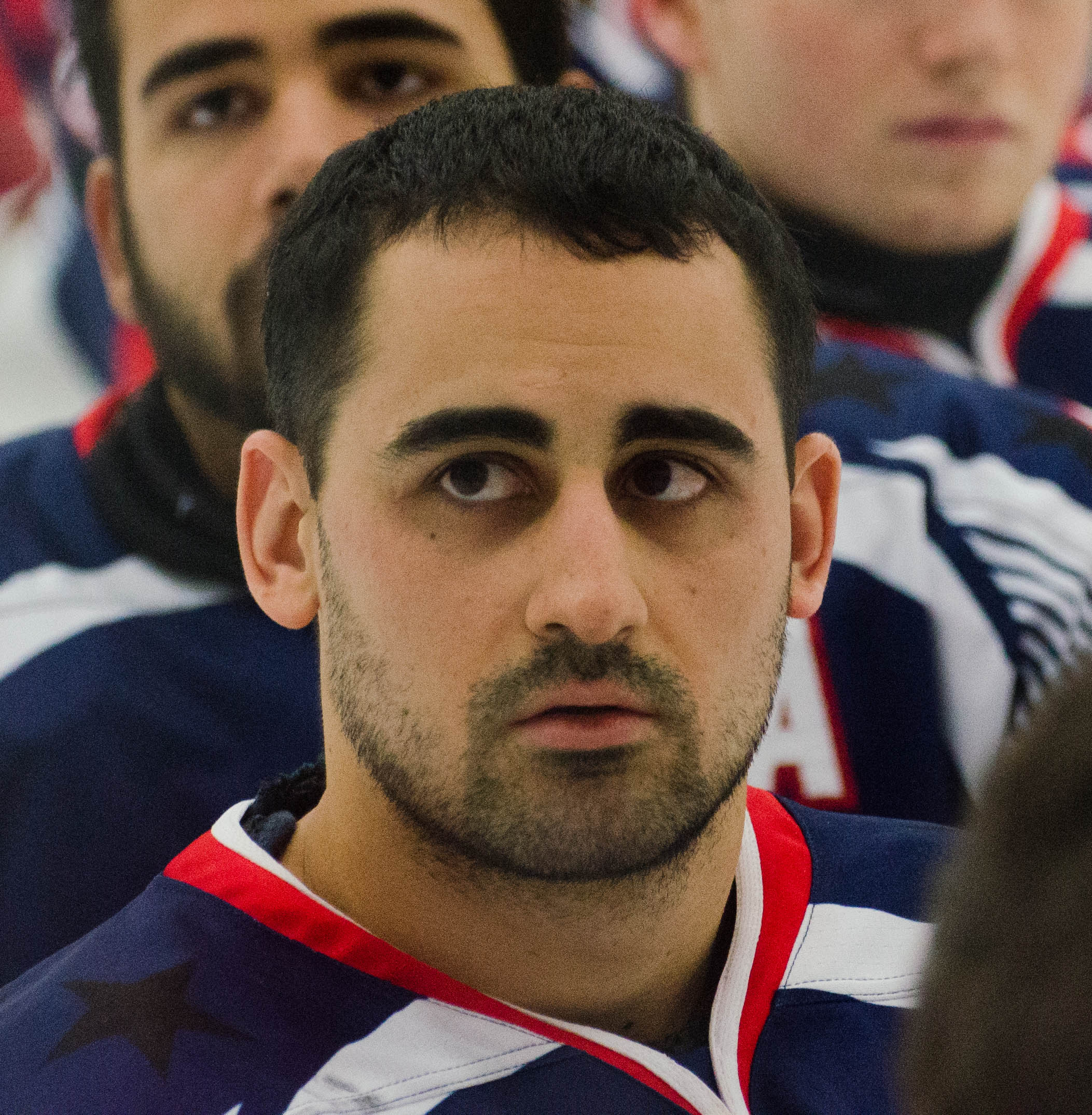
- Cash in 2015

Personal information
- Full name: Steven Cash
- Born: May 9, 1989 (age 37) St. Louis, Missouri, U.S.
Medal record
Para ice hockey
Representing United States
Paralympic Games
Gold medal – first place	2010 Vancouver	Team competition
Gold medal – first place	2014 Sochi	Team competition
Gold medal – first place	2018 PyeongChang	Team competition
Bronze medal – third place	2006 Torino	Team competition
World Championships
Gold medal – first place	2009 Ostrava	Team competition
Gold medal – first place	2012 Hamar	Team competition
Gold medal – first place	2015 Buffalo	Team competition
Gold medal – first place	2019 Ostrava	Team competition
Gold medal – first place	2021 Ostrava	Team competition
Silver medal – second place	2013 Goyang	Team competition
Silver medal – second place	2017 Gangneung	Team competition
Bronze medal – third place	2008 Marlborough	Team competition

Steven Cash (born May 9, 1989) is an American former ice sled hockey player from the United States. Cash was a member of the United States men's national ice sledge hockey team for 16 seasons after making his debut in the 2005–06 season. He is a three-time Winter Paralympic Games gold medalist.

== Career ==
Cash plays goalie and was a member of the U.S. teams that won gold in the 2010 Winter Paralympics in Vancouver, 2014 Winter Paralympics in Sochi, and 2018 Winter Paralympics in Pyeongchang. He was also part of the team that won the bronze medal in the 2006 Winter Paralympics in Torino. At the 2010 Winter Paralympics, he set a Paralympic record after recording five shutouts and not allowing a single goal. He was awarded the Best Male Athlete with a Disability ESPY Award at the 2010 ESPY Awards following his performance.

On October 25, 2021, Cash announced his retirement after sixteen seasons with the United States men's national ice sledge hockey team. He finished his career with three Winter Paralympic Games gold medals and five World Championships gold medals. He won 119 of the 159 games he appeared in, racking up a career 1.22 goals against average (GAA) and .898 save percentage. In 40 games played at the World Championship level, he won 33 of his 40 contests, recording 15 shutouts and helping the US become the first country to win back-to-back gold medals.

== Personal life ==
Cash's right leg was amputated when he was 3 years old as a result of a form of bone cancer called osteosarcoma. Cash was a 2007 graduate of Ritenour High School in Saint Louis, Missouri, where he played goalie for the full-sided ice hockey team. From 2004 to 2011, he was a member of the Disabled Athlete Sports Association Junior Blues Sled Hockey club.
