= Atsuya Yaguchi =

Japanese ice sledge hockey player

Personal information
- Native name: 矢口敦也
- Born: November 27, 1976 (age 49) Matsumoto, Nagano, Japan

Sport
- Sport: Sledge hockey
- Position: Forward
- Team: Nagano Thunderbirds
Medal record
Men's para ice hockey
Representing Japan
Paralympic Games
Silver medal – second place	2010 Vancouver	Team

Atsuya Yaguchi (矢口 敦也, Yaguchi Atsuya; born 27 November 1976 in Matsumoto, Nagano Prefecture) is a Japanese sledge hockey player. He was part of the Japanese sledge hockey team that won a silver medal at the 2010 Winter Paralympics.

He has a functional disability of his trunk.
