= Brad Emmerson =

American ice sledge hockey player

Personal information
- Born: December 16, 1985 (age 40)
Medal record
Men's para ice hockey
Representing United States
Paralympic Games
Gold medal – first place	2010 Vancouver	Team competition
World Championships
Gold medal – first place	2009 Ostrava	Team competition

Brad Emmerson (born December 16, 1985) is an American ice sledge hockey player and Paralympic gold medalist. Competing at the 2010 Winter Paralympics, he won a gold medal in the men's ice sledge hockey tournament.
