= Andrew Yohe =

American ice sledge hockey player

Andy Yohe
- Born: July 21, 1978 (age 48) Davenport, Iowa, U.S.
- Height: 5 ft 10 in (178 cm)
- Weight: 175 lb (79 kg; 12 st 7 lb)
- Position: Forward/Defense
- National team: United States
- Playing career: 2003–present
Medal record
Para ice hockey
Representing United States
Paralympic Games
Gold medal – first place	2010 Vancouver	Team competition
Gold medal – first place	2014 Sochi	Team competition
Bronze medal – third place	2006 Turin	Team competition
World Championships
Gold medal – first place	2009 Ostrava	Team competition
Silver medal – second place	2017 Gangneung	Team competition

Andrew "Andy" Yohe (born July 21, 1978) is an ice sled hockey player from United States. Yohe was team captain at the 2010 Winter Paralympics in Vancouver, where the USA defeated Japan by a 2-0 tally to win the gold medal.

Yohe was a competitive roller hockey player for the Bettendorf (Iowa) Young Guns. In September 1994, he lost both legs in an accident, in which he was run over while trying to jump onto a train. From 2003 to 2009, Yohe was a member of the Rehabilitation Institute of Chicago Blackhawks Sled Hockey club.
