= Taylor Chace =

American ice sledge hockey player

Personal information
- Born: May 9, 1986 (age 40) Portsmouth, New Hampshire, U.S.
- Years active: 2003–present
- Height: 6 ft 1 in (1.85 m)
- Weight: 205 lb (93 kg)

Sport
- Country: United States
- Sport: Ice sledge hockey
- Position: Forward
Medal record
Para ice hockey
Representing United States
Paralympic Games
Gold medal – first place	2010 Vancouver	Team competition
Gold medal – first place	2014 Sochi	Team competition
Bronze medal – third place	2006 Turin	Team competition
World Championships
Gold medal – first place	2009 Ostrava	Team competition
Gold medal – first place	2012 Hamar	Team competition
Silver medal – second place	2013 Goyang	Team competition
Bronze medal – third place	2008 Marlborough	Team competition

Taylor Chace (born May 9, 1986) is an American ice sledge hockey player.

Chace is one of three children of Ric and Lisa Chace. He began playing ice hockey at age 5, and by age 16 was playing for the New Hampshire Junior Monarchs. During an October 2002 game, he was checked back-first into the boards. The impact broke the L1 vertebra in his lower back, resulting in an incomplete spinal cord injury and partial paralysis of his legs.

Chace was introduced to the sport of sled hockey through Northeast Passage, a program affiliated with the University of New Hampshire, where his older sister was attending college. He was named to the U.S. national team in late 2005 and participated in the 2006 Winter Paralympics in Turin, Italy, where the team took a bronze medal. He helped win another bronze at the 2008 IPC Ice Sledge Hockey World Championships, and at the 2009 World Championships he assisted in the gold medal-winning goal in a match against Norway. In 2010, he helped his team capture the gold medal in the Vancouver, BC Paralympic Winter Games. He won a second gold medal in the Paralympic Winter Games in Sochi, Russia.

== Early life ==
Chace attended Cardigan Mountain School and graduated from the University of New Hampshire in 2011, majoring in Sports Studies. He is currently employed at Northeast Passage where he performs strength and conditioning coaching for competitive athletes with disabilities, coaches sled hockey and speaks to groups promoting awareness of recreation and competitive opportunities for youth and adult athletes with disabilities. He is certified by the National Strength and Conditioning Association as a Strength and Conditioning Specialist.
