= Lee Yong-min (sledge hockey) =

South Korean sledge hockey player

Personal information
- Born: 20 December 1974 (age 51)
Medal record
Para ice hockey
Representing South Korea
Paralympic Games
Bronze medal – third place	2018 PyeongChang	Team competition
World Championships
Silver medal – second place	2012 Hamar	Team competition

Lee Yong-min (Korean: 이용민; RR: I Yongmin, born 20 December 1974) is a South Korean sledge hockey player. He was part of the Korean team that won a bronze medal at the 2018 Winter Paralympics.

His legs were amputated following a car accident in 1994.
