= Sa Sung-keun =

South Korean sledge hockey player

Sa Sung-Keun
Personal information
- Nationality: South Korea
- Born: 27 January 1967 (age 59)
Medal record
Men's para ice hockey
Representing South Korea
World Championships
Silver medal – second place	2012 Hamar	Team competition

Sa Sung-Keun (Korean: 사성근, born 27 January 1967) is a South Korean sledge hockey player. He played in the 2010 and 2014 Paralympic Winter Games. He won a silver medal at the 2012 IPC Ice Sledge Hockey World Championships.
