= Taylor Lipsett =

American ice sledge hockey player (born 1987)

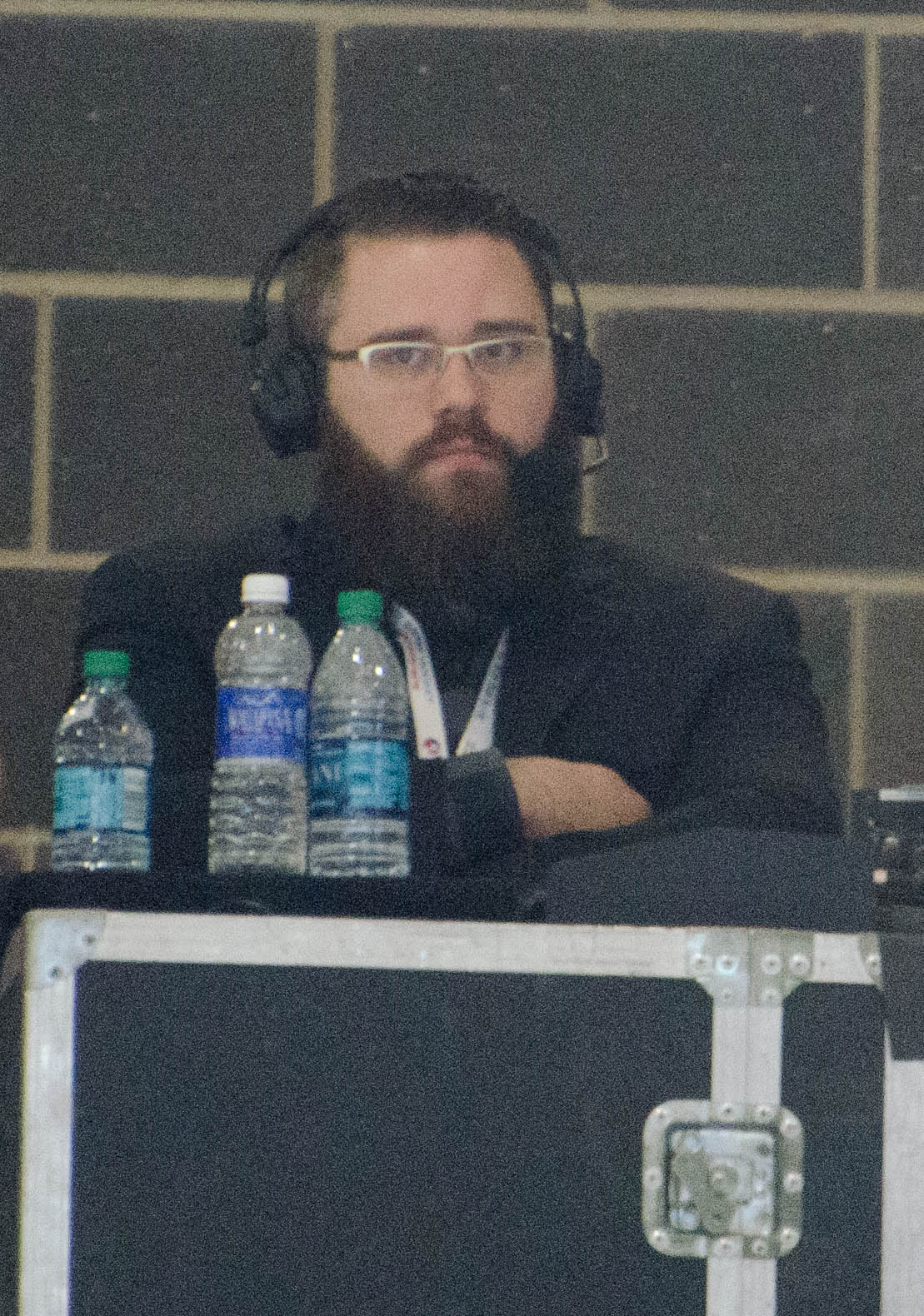
- Lipsett at the 2015 IPC Ice Sledge Hockey World Championships

Personal information
- Full name: Andrew Lipsett
- Born: January 2, 1987 (age 39) Mesquite, Texas, United States
- Years active: 2003–present
- Height: 5 ft 4 in (1.63 m)
- Weight: 160 lb (73 kg)

Sport
- Country: United States
- Sport: Ice sledge hockey
- Position: Forward
Medal record
Para ice hockey
Representing United States
Paralympic Games
Gold medal – first place	2010 Vancouver	Team competition
Gold medal – first place	2014 Sochi	Team competition
Bronze medal – third place	2006 Turin	Team competition
World Championships
Gold medal – first place	2009 Ostrava	Team competition
Bronze medal – third place	2008 Marlborough	Team competition

Andrew "Taylor" Lipsett (born January 2, 1987) is an ice sledge hockey player and Paralympic Gold and bronze medalist. He graduated from Southern Methodist University and is married. He is also a member of the charity "Team for Tomorrow" and has Osteogenesis imperfecta.
