= Toshiyuki Nakamura =

Japanese ice sledge hockey player

Personal information
- Native name: 中村稔幸
- Born: March 8, 1969 (age 57) Nagano, Japan
- Height: 1.765 m (5 ft 9 in)
- Weight: 74 kg (163 lb)

Sport
- Sport: Ice sledge hockey
- Position: Defenceman
- Disability: Amputee
- Team: Nagano Thunderbirds
Medal record
Men's para ice hockey
Representing Japan
Paralympic Games
Silver medal – second place	2010 Vancouver	Team

Toshiyuki Nakamura (中村 稔幸, Nakamura Toshiyuki; born 8 March 1969 in Nagano Prefecture) is a Japanese ice sledge hockey player. He was part of the Japanese sledge hockey team that won a silver medal at the 2010 Winter Paralympics.

Both of his legs were amputated below the knee following a traffic accident when he was a firefighter.
