= Noritaka Ito =

Japanese sledge hockey player

Personal information
- Native name: 伊藤仙孝
- Born: May 29, 1983 (age 43) Asahikawa, Hokkaido, Japan

Sport
- Sport: Sledge hockey
- Position: Forward
- Disability: Amputee (since 2005)
- Team: Hokkaido Bears
Medal record
Men's para ice hockey
Representing Japan
Paralympic Games
| Silver medal – second place | 2010 Vancouver | Team |

Noritaka Ito (伊藤 仙孝, Itō Noritaka; born 29 May 1983 in Asahikawa, Hokkaido) is a Japanese ice sledge hockey player. He was part of the Japanese sledge hockey team that won a silver medal at the 2010 Winter Paralympics.

Both his legs were amputated following an accident when he was 22.
