= Makoto Majima =

Japanese ice sledge hockey player and para powerlifter

Personal information
- Native name: 馬島誠
- Born: August 24, 1971 (age 54) Tatsuno, Nagano, Japan
- Education: Komazawa University

Sport
- Sport: Sledge hockey
- Position: Forward
- Disability: Electrical injury
- Team: Nagano Thunderbirds
Medal record
Men's para ice hockey
Representing Japan
Paralympic Games
Silver medal – second place	2010 Vancouver	Team

Makoto Majima (馬島 誠, Majima Makoto; born 24 August 1971 in Tatsuno, Nagano Prefecture) is a Japanese ice sledge hockey player and para powerlifter. He was part of the Japanese sledge hockey team that won a silver medal at the 2010 Winter Paralympics.

In his third year at university, he lost the functioning of both legs following an accident involving high-voltage electric wires.
