= Mikio Annaka =

Japanese sledge hockey player

Personal information
- Native name: 安中幹雄
- Born: August 15, 1971 (age 54) Musashino, Tokyo, Japan
- Height: 1.78 m (5 ft 10 in)
- Weight: 60 kg (132 lb)

Sport
- Sport: Sledge hockey
- Position: Forward
- Disability: Amputee (since 1989)
- Team: Tokyo Ice Burns
Medal record
Men's para ice hockey
Representing Japan
Paralympic Games
Silver medal – second place	2010 Vancouver	Team

Mikio Annaka (安中 幹雄, Annaka Mikio; born 15 August 1971 in Musashino, Tokyo) is a Japanese ice sledge hockey player. He was part of the Japanese sledge hockey team that won a silver medal at the 2010 Winter Paralympics.

When he was in high school, his right leg was amputated above the knee following a bone cancer diagnosis.
