= Park Sang-hyeon =

South Korean sledge hockey player

Park Sang-Hyeon
Personal information
- Nationality: South Korea
- Born: 9 September 1973 (age 52)
Medal record
Men's para ice hockey
Representing South Korea
World Championships
Silver medal – second place	2012 Hamar	Team competition

Park Sang-Hyeon (Korean: 박상현, born 9 September 1973) is a South Korean sledge hockey player. He played in the 2010 and 2014 Paralympic Winter Games. He won a silver medal at the 2012 IPC Ice Sledge Hockey World Championships.
