= Eiji Misawa =

Japanese ice sledge hockey player

Personal information
- Native name: 三澤英司
- Born: February 22, 1973 (age 53) Tachikawa, Tokyo, Japan
- Height: 1.72 m (5 ft 8 in)
- Weight: 54 kg (119 lb)

Sport
- Sport: Ice sledge hockey
- Position: Defenceman
- Disability: Amputee (since 1990)
- Team: Hokkaido Bears
Medal record
Men's para ice hockey
Representing Japan
Paralympic Games
| Silver medal – second place | 2010 Vancouver | Team |

Eiji Misawa (三澤 英司, shinjitai: 三沢 英司, Misawa Eiji; born 22 February 1973 in Tachikawa, Tokyo) is a Japanese ice sledge hockey player. He was part of the Japanese sledge hockey team that won a silver medal at the 2010 Winter Paralympics.

His right leg was amputated due to a tumour at age 17.
