= Mamoru Yoshikawa =

Japanese ice sledge hockey player

Personal information
- Native name: 吉川守
- Born: February 18, 1970 (age 56) Iida, Nagano, Japan
- Height: 1.65 m (5 ft 5 in)
- Weight: 62 kg (137 lb)

Sport
- Sport: Ice sledge hockey
- Position: Forward
- Team: Nagano Thunderbirds
Medal record
Men's para ice hockey
Representing Japan
Paralympic Games
Silver medal – second place	2010 Vancouver	Team

Mamoru Yoshikawa (吉川 守, Yoshikawa Mamoru; born 18 February 1970 in Iida, Nagano Prefecture) is a Japanese ice sledge hockey player. He was part of the Japanese sledge hockey team that won a silver medal at the 2010 Winter Paralympics.

When he was 18, he was involved in a motorcycle accident which impaired his left leg joints and left hand fingers.
