= Takayuki Endo =

Japanese sledge hockey player

Personal information
- Native name: 遠藤隆行
- Born: March 19, 1978 (age 48) Saitama, Japan
- Education: Surugadai University

Sport
- Sport: Sledge hockey
- Position: Defenceman
- Team: Tokyo Ice Burns
Medal record
Men's para ice hockey
Representing Japan
Paralympic Games
Silver medal – second place	2010 Vancouver	Team

Takayuki Endo (遠藤 隆行, Endō Takayuki; born 19 March 1978 in Saitama Prefecture) is a Japanese ice sledge hockey player and rower. He was part of the Japanese sledge hockey team that won a silver medal at the 2010 Winter Paralympics. He was also Japan's national flag bearer there. He was awarded the Whang Youn Dai Achievement Award that year.

He has a congenital deficiency in both legs.

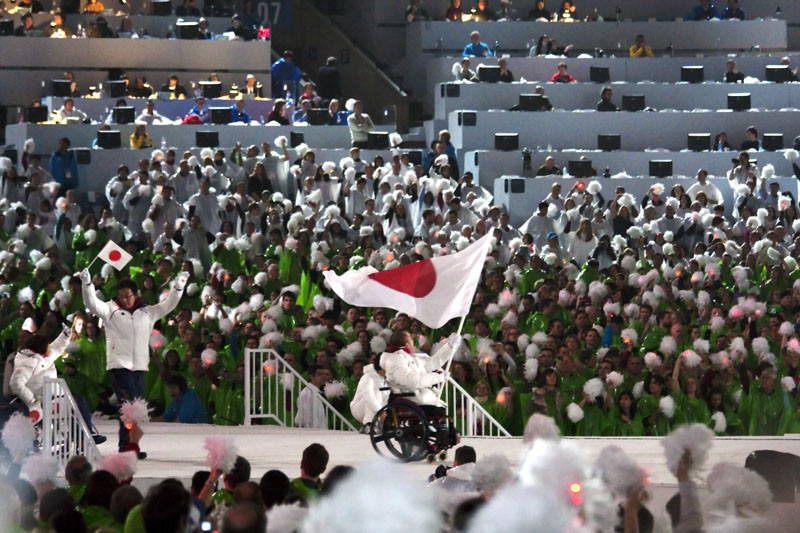
Endo bearing the Japanese flag during the Parade of Nations at the 2010 Winter Paralympics opening ceremony on March 12, 2010.
