= Mitsuru Nagase =

Japanese ice sledge hockey player

Personal information
- Native name: 永瀬充
- Nationality: Japan
- Born: January 23, 1976 (age 50) Asahikawa, Hokkaido

Sport
- Sport: Ice sledge hockey
- Position: Goaltender
- Disability: Chronic inflammatory demyelinating polyneuropathy
- Team: Hokkaido Bears
Medal record
Men's para ice hockey
Representing Japan
Paralympic Games
| Silver medal – second place | 2010 Vancouver | Team |

Mitsuru Nagase (永瀬 充, Nagase Mitsuru; born 23 January 1976 in Asahikawa, Hokkaido) is a retired Japanese ice sledge hockey goaltender. He was part of the Japanese sledge hockey team that won a silver medal at the 2010 Winter Paralympics.

In 1991, he was diagnosed with chronic inflammatory demyelinating polyneuropathy which caused his disability.
