= Satoru Sudo =

Japanese ice sledge hockey player

Personal information
- Native name: 須藤悟
- Born: October 23, 1970 (age 55) Tomakomai, Hokkaido, Japan
- Height: 1.70 m (5 ft 7 in)
- Weight: 87 kg (192 lb)

Sport
- Sport: Ice sledge hockey
- Position: Defenceman
- Disability: Amputee (since 1992)
- Team: Hokkaido Bears
Medal record
Men's para ice hockey
Representing Japan
Paralympic Games
| Silver medal – second place | 2010 Vancouver | Team |

Satoru Sudo (須藤 悟, Sudō Satoru; born 23 October 1970 in Tomakomai, Hokkaido) is a Japanese ice sledge hockey player. He was part of the Japanese sledge hockey team that won a silver medal at the 2010 Winter Paralympics.

His lower legs were amputated following an elevator accident in 1992.
