= Daisuke Uehara =

Japanese sledge hockey player

Personal information
- Native name: 上原大祐
- Born: December 27, 1981 (age 44) Karuizawa, Nagano, Japan
- Education: Nagano University
- Height: 1.45 m (4 ft 9 in)
- Weight: 53 kg (117 lb)

Sport
- Sport: Sledge hockey
- Position: Forward
- Disability: Spina bifida
- Team: Tokyo Ice Burns
Medal record
Para ice hockey
Representing Japan
Paralympic Games
Silver medal – second place	2010 Vancouver	Team

Daisuke Uehara (上原 大祐, Uehara Daisuke; born 27 December 1981 in Karuizawa, Nagano Prefecture) is a Japanese ice sledge hockey player. He was part of the Japanese sledge hockey team that won a silver medal at the 2010 Winter Paralympics.

He was born with spina bifida.
