= Kazuhiro Takahashi (sledge hockey) =

Japanese sledge hockey player

Personal information
- Native name: 高橋和廣
- Born: December 4, 1978 (age 47) Hōya, Tokyo, Japan
- Education: Chiba Institute of Technology
- Height: 1.74 m (5 ft 9 in)
- Weight: 78 kg (172 lb)

Sport
- Sport: Ice sledge hockey
- Position: Forward
- Disability: Spinal cord injury
- Team: Tokyo Ice Burns
Medal record
Men's para ice hockey
Representing Japan
Paralympic Games
Silver medal – second place	2010 Vancouver	Team

Kazuhiro Takahashi (高橋 和廣, shinjitai: 高橋 和広, Takahashi Kazuhiro; born 4 December 1978 in Hōya (now Nishitōkyō), Tokyo) is a Japanese ice sledge hockey player. He was part of the Japanese sledge hockey team that won a silver medal at the 2010 Winter Paralympics.

He injured his spinal cord during a snowboarding accident when he was 21.
