= Naohiko Ishida =

Japanese sledge hockey player

Personal information
- Native name: 石田真彦
- Born: August 9, 1967 (age 58) Aichi, Japan

Sport
- Sport: Sledge hockey
- Position: Defenceman
- Team: Nagano Thunderbirds
Medal record
Men's para ice hockey
Representing Japan
Paralympic Games
| Silver medal – second place | 2010 Vancouver | Team |

Naohiko Ishida (石田 真彦, Ishida Naohiko; born 9 August 1967 in Aichi Prefecture) is a Japanese ice sledge hockey player. He was part of the Japanese sledge hockey team that won a silver medal at the 2010 Winter Paralympics.

He has a congenital deficiency of his upper left leg.
