= List of 2006 Winter Paralympics medal winners =

The 2006 Winter Paralympics were held in Turin, Italy, from 10 March to 19 March 2006. Approximately 486 athletes from 39 National Paralympic Committees (NPCs) participated in these Games.

The Games featured 58 medal events in 5 disciplines grouped over 4 sports. Wheelchair curling made its Paralympic debut.

Several disability classifications that were held as separate events in the 2002 Winter Paralympics were held together at the 2006 Paralympics. Competitors were given a factored time based on their real time and the level of disability of the competitor. This resulted in a decrease in the number of medals on offer.

== Alpine skiing ==
Event	Class	Gold	Silver	Bronze
Women's downhill	visually impaired	Pascale Casanova; France	Sabine Gasteiger; Austria	Silvia Parente; Italy
Women's downhill	sitting	Laurie Stephens; United States	Kuniko Obinata; Japan	Claudia Loesch; Austria
Women's downhill	standing	Solène Jambaqué; France	Reinhild Moeller; Germany	Iveta Chlebakova; Slovakia
Women's Super-G	visually impaired	Sabine Gasteiger; Austria	Anna Kuliskova; Czech Republic	Silvia Parente; Italy
Women's Super-G	sitting	Laurie Stephens; United States	Kuniko Obinata; Japan	Kimberly Joines; Canada
Women's Super-G	standing	Solène Jambaqué; France	Lauren Woolstencroft; Canada	Danja Haslacher; Austria
Women's giant slalom	visually impaired	Silvia Parente; Italy	Pascale Casanova; France	Sabine Gasteiger; Austria
Women's giant slalom	sitting	Kuniko Obinata; Japan	Laurie Stephens; United States	Daila Dameno; Italy
Women's giant slalom	standing	Lauren Woolstencroft; Canada	Andrea Rothfuss; Germany	Solène Jambaqué; France
Women's slalom	visually impaired	Pascale Casanova; France	Sabine Gasteiger; Austria	Silvia Parente; Italy
Women's slalom	sitting	Stephani Victor; United States	Daila Dameno; Italy	Tatsuko Aoki; Japan
Women's slalom	standing	Allison Jones; United States	Solène Jambaqué; France	Sandy Dukat; United States
Men's downhill	visually impaired	Gerd Gradwohl; Germany	Chris Williamson; Canada	Nicolas Berejny; France
Men's downhill	sitting	Kevin Bramble; United States	Chris Devlin-Young; United States	Denis Barbet; France
Men's downhill	standing	Gerd Schoenfelder; Germany	Michael Milton; Australia	Walter Lackner; Austria
Men's Super-G	visually impaired	Gianmaria Dal Maistro; Italy	Radomir Dudas; Slovakia	Chris Williamson; Canada
Men's Super-G	sitting	Martin Braxenthaler; Germany	Harald Eder; Austria	Robert Froehle; Austria
Men's Super-G	standing	Walter Lackner; Austria	Gerd Schoenfelder; Germany	Toby Kane; Australia
Men's giant slalom	visually impaired	Nicolas Berejny; France	Gianmaria Dal Maistro; Italy	Eric Villalon; Spain
Men's giant slalom	sitting	Martin Braxenthaler; Germany	Taiki Morii; Japan	Juergen Egle; Austria
Men's giant slalom	standing	Gerd Schoenfelder; Germany	Masahiko Tokai; Japan	Thomas Pfyl; Switzerland
Men's slalom	visually impaired	Nicolas Berejny; France	Eric Villalon; Spain	Gerd Gradwohl; Germany
Men's slalom	sitting	Martin Braxenthaler; Germany	Harald Eder; Austria	Juergen Egle; Austria
Men's slalom	standing	Robert Meusburger; Austria	Thomas Pfyl; Switzerland	Gerd Schoenfelder; Germany

== Biathlon ==
Event	Class	Gold	Silver	Bronze
Women's 7.5 km	visually impaired	Verena Bentele; Germany	Miyuki Kobayashi; Japan	Elvira Ibraginova; Russia
Women's 7.5 km	sitting	Olena Iurkovska; Ukraine	Svitlana Tryfonova; Ukraine	Lyudmyla Pavlenko; Ukraine
Women's 7.5 km	standing	Alena Gorbunova; Russia	Anna Burmistrova; Russia	Anne Floriet; France
Women's 10 km	sitting	Olena Iurkovska; Ukraine	Lyudmyla Pavlenko; Ukraine	Svitlana Tryfonova; Ukraine
Women's 12.5 km	visually impaired	Miyuki Kobayashi; Japan	Tetyana Smyrnova; Ukraine	Verena Bentele; Germany
Women's 12.5 km	standing	Anne Floriet; France	Yuliya Batenkova; Ukraine	Shoko Ota; Japan
Men's 7.5 km	visually impaired	Irek Mannanov; Russia	Vitaliy Lukyanenko; Ukraine	Brian McKeever; Canada
Men's 7.5 km	sitting	Vladimir Kiselev; Russia	Iurii Kostiuk; Ukraine	Sergiy Khyzhnyak; Ukraine
Men's 7.5 km	standing	Rustam Garifoullin; Russia	Josef Giesen; Germany	Nils Erik Ulset; Norway
Men's 12.5 km	visually impaired	Vitaliy Lukyanenko; Ukraine	Irek Mannanov; Russia	Wilhelm Brem; Germany
Men's 12.5 km	sitting	Vladimir Kiselev; Russia	Taras Kryjanovski; Russia	Mikhail Terentiev; Russia
Men's 12.5 km	standing	Rustam Garifoullin; Russia	Alfis Makamedinov; Russia	Nils Erik Ulset; Norway

== Cross-country skiing ==
Event	Class	Gold	Silver	Bronze
Women's 2.5 km	sitting	Olena Iurkovska; Ukraine	Liudmila Vauchok; Belarus	Lyudmyla Pavlenko; Ukraine
Women's 5 km	visually impaired	Verena Bentele; Germany	Tatiana Ilyuchenko; Russia	Lioubov Vasilieva; Russia
Women's 5 km	standing	Katarzyna Rogowiec; Poland	Anna Burmistrova; Russia	Yuliya Batenkova; Ukraine
Women's 5 km	sitting	Olena Iurkovska; Ukraine	Liudmila Vauchok; Belarus	Colette Bourgonje; Canada
Women's 10 km	visually impaired	Lioubov Vasilieva; Russia	Tatiana Ilyuchenko; Russia	Yadviha Skarabahataya; Belarus
Women's 10 km	standing	Anna Burmistrova; Russia	Yuliya Batenkova; Ukraine	Anne Floriet; France
Women's 10 km	sitting	Liudmila Vauchok; Belarus	Olena Iurkovska; Ukraine	Colette Bourgonje; Canada
Women's 15 km	visually impaired	Lioubov Vasilieva; Russia	Yadviha Skarabahataya; Belarus	Tatiana Ilyuchenko; Russia
Women's 15 km	standing	Katarzyna Rogowiec; Poland	Anna Burmistrova; Russia	Yuliya Batenkova; Ukraine
Women's 3 x 2.5 km Relay		Russia (RUS); Tatiana Ilyuchenko; Irina Polyakova; Lioubov Vasilieva	Belarus (BLR); Yadviha Skarabahataya; Larysa Varona; Liudmila Vauchok	Ukraine (UKR); Yuliya Batenkova; Olena Iurkovska; Lyudmyla Pavlenko
Men's 5 km	visually impaired	Brian McKeever; Canada	Frank Hoefle; Germany	Helge Flo; Norway
Men's 5 km	sitting	Taras Kryjanovski; Russia	Iurii Kostiuk; Ukraine	Alain Marguerettaz; France
Men's 5 km	standing	Steve Cook; United States	Siarhei Silchanka; Belarus	Thomas Oelsner; Germany
Men's 10 km	visually impaired	Brian McKeever; Canada	Vasili Shaptsiaboi; Belarus	Valery Koupchinsky; Russia
Men's 10 km	sitting	Taras Kryjanovski; Russia	Sergej Shilov; Russia	Iurii Kostiuk; Ukraine
Men's 10 km	standing	Steve Cook; United States	Alfis Makamedinov; Russia	Kirill Mikhaylov; Russia
Men's 15 km	sitting	Iurii Kostiuk; Ukraine	Taras Kryjanovski; Russia	Sergej Shilov; Russia
Men's 20 km Free	visually impaired	Oleh Munts; Ukraine	Brian McKeever; Canada	Vasili Shaptsiaboi; Belarus
Men's 20 km Free	standing	Kirill Mikhaylov; Russia	Alfis Makamedinov; Russia	Steve Cook; United States
Men's 1 x 3.75 km + 2 x 5 km Relay		Norway (NOR); Kjartan Haugen; Karl Einar Henriksen; Andreas Hustveit	Russia (RUS); Rustam Garifoullin; Irek Mannanov; Sergej Shilov	Ukraine (UKR); Vitaliy Lukyanenko; Vladyslav Morozov; Oleh Munts

== Wheelchair curling ==
Games	Gold	Silver	Bronze
Mixed	Canada (CAN); Chris Daw; Gerry Austgarden; Gary Cormack; Sonja Gaudet; Karen Blachford	Great Britain (GBR); Frank Duffy; Michael McCreadie; Tom Killin; Angie Malone; Ken Dickson	Sweden (SWE); Jalle Jungnell; Glenn Ikonen; Rolf Johansson; Anette Wilhelm; Bernt Sjoeberg

== Ice sledge hockey ==
Event	Gold	Silver	Bronze
Team	Canada (CAN)	Norway (NOR)	United States (USA)
Team	Jeremy Booker; Bradley Bowden; Billy Bridges; Marc Dorion; Raymond Grassi; Jean Labonte; Herve Lord; Shawn Matheson; Graeme Murray; Todd Nicholson; Mark Noot; Paul Rosen; Benoit St.Amand; Dany Verner; Greg Westlake	Helge Bjornstad; Eskil Hagen; Atle Haglund; Loyd Remi Johansen; Roger Johansen; Kjetil Korbu Nilsen; Knut Andre Norstoga; Rolf Einar Pedersen; Tommy Rovelstad; Kjell Vidar Royne; Johan Siqveland; Stig Tore Svee; Morten Vaernes; Arne Vik	Steve Cash; Taylor Chace; David Conklin; James Connelly; Bradley Emmerson; Manny Guerra Jr. Michael Hallman; Lonnie Hannah II; Joe Howard; Tim Jones; Taylor Lipsett; Christopher Manns; Alex Salamone; Kip St.Germaine; Andrew Yohe

== Medal leaders ==
Athletes that won at least two gold medals or at least three total medals are listed below.

Athlete	Nation	Sport	Gold	Silver	Bronze	Total
Olena Iurkovska	Ukraine (UKR)	Biathlon / Cross-country skiing	4	1	1	6
Yuliya Batenkova	Ukraine (UKR)	Biathlon / Cross-country skiing	0	2	3	5
Lioubov Vasilieva	Russia (RUS)	Cross-country skiing	3	0	1	4
Taras Kryjanovski	Russia (RUS)	Biathlon / Cross-country skiing	2	2	0	4
Solène Jambaqué	France (FRA)	Alpine skiing	2	1	1	4
Gerd Schoenfelder	Germany (GER)	Alpine skiing	2	1	1	4
Brian McKeever	Canada (CAN)	Biathlon / Cross-country skiing	2	1	1	4
Anna Burmistrova	Russia (RUS)	Biathlon / Cross-country skiing	1	3	0	4
Liudmila Vauchok	Belarus (BLR)	Cross-country skiing	1	3	0	4
Sabine Gasteiger	Austria (AUT)	Alpine skiing	1	2	1	4
Tatiana Ilyuchenko	Russia (RUS)	Cross-country skiing	1	2	1	4
Iurii Kostiuk	Ukraine (UKR)	Biathlon / Cross-country skiing	1	2	1	4
Silvia Parente	Italy (ITA)	Alpine skiing	1	0	3	4
Lyudmyla Pavlenko	Ukraine (UKR)	Biathlon / Cross-country skiing	0	1	3	4
Martin Braxenthaler	Germany (GER)	Alpine skiing	3	0	0	3
Pascale Casanova	France (FRA)	Alpine skiing	2	1	0	3
Laurie Stephens	United States (USA)	Alpine skiing	2	1	0	3
Rustam Garifoullin	Russia (RUS)	Biathlon / Cross-country skiing	2	1	0	3
Nicolas Berejny	France (FRA)	Alpine skiing	2	0	1	3
Steve Cook	United States (USA)	Cross-country skiing	2	0	1	3
Verena Bentele	Germany (GER)	Biathlon / Cross-country skiing	2	0	1	3
Irek Mannanov	Russia (RUS)	Biathlon / Cross-country skiing	1	2	0	3
Kuniko Obinata	Japan (JPN)	Alpine skiing	1	2	0	3
Vitaliy Lukyanenko	Ukraine (UKR)	Biathlon / Cross-country skiing	1	1	1	3
Anne Floriet	France (FRA)	Biathlon / Cross-country skiing	1	0	2	3
Alfis Makamedinov	Russia (RUS)	Biathlon / Cross-country skiing	0	3	0	3
Yadviha Skarabahataya	Belarus (BLR)	Cross-country skiing	0	2	1	3
Sergej Shilov	Russia (RUS)	Cross-country skiing	0	2	1	3
Katarzyna Rogowiec	Poland (POL)	Cross-country skiing	2	0	0	2
Vladimir Kiselev	Russia (RUS)	Biathlon	2	0	0	2

== See also ==
- List of 2006 Winter Olympics medal winners
