= 2000 IPC Ice Sledge Hockey World Championships =

Tournament details
- Host country: United States
- Venue: 1 (in 1 host city)
- Dates: March 20–25, 2000
- Teams: 6

Final positions
- Champions: Canada

The 2000 IPC Ice Sledge Hockey World Championships was the second IPC Ice Sledge Hockey World Championships held between March 20, 2000, and March 25, 2000, at the E Center in West Valley City, Utah, United States. The same place where would host the same sport two years later as the first test event for the Paralympic Winter Games in 2002. Participating countries: Canada, Estonia, Japan, Norway, Sweden and United States.

== Final rankings ==
Canada beat Norway 2–1 to win the gold medal. The game went into overtime and more than 6,000 fans cheered on as Canada's Shawn Matheson scored the winning goal. The victory gave Canada, the country that created the sport, its first gold medal in sledge hockey, and avenged a gold-medal loss to Norway at the 1998 Paralympics in Nagano. Sweden grabbed the bronze by beating Japan 5–1, while Estonia squared off with the United States to take 5th place.

| Gold: | Silver: | Bronze: | 4th: | 5th | 6th |
|---|---|---|---|---|---|
| Canada Bradley Bowden; Billy Bridges; Erik Desjardins; Jean Labonté; Robert Lagace; Serge Lamoureux; Hervé Lord; Warren Martin; Shawn Matheson; Lou Mulvihill; Todd Nicholson; Pierre Pichette; Dany Verner | Norway Helge Bjørnstad; Knut Erling Granaas; Eskil Hagen; Atle Haglund; Roger Hansen; Tommy Rovelstad; Erik Sandbraaten; Geir Arne Skogstad; Stig Tore Svee; Morten Syversen; Arne Vik | Sweden Dedjo Engmark; Marcus Holm; Rasmus Isaksson; Bengt-Gösta Johansson; Kent Jonsson; Göran Karlsson; Jens Kask; Joakim Larsson; Leif Norgren; Mats Nyman; Leif Wahlstedt | Japan Takayuki Endo; Shinobu Fukushima; Tadanobu Go; Naohiko Ishida; Tadashi Kato; Eiji Misawa; Mitsuru Nagase; Kanichi Naito; Taimei Shiba; Satoru Sudo; Toshifumi Takeuchi; Atsuya Yaguchi | Estonia Viktor Artemjev; Aleksander Jarlõkov; Kaido Kalm; Arvi Piirioja; Raul Sas; Andrei Sokolov; Jüri Tammleht; Maksim Vedernikov; Leonid Zubov | United States Dave Conklin; Sylvester Flis; Manuel Guerra Jr. Dan Henderson; Joe Howard; Kip St.Germaine C Josh Wirt |

== See also ==
- Ice sledge hockey
- Ice hockey#Sledge hockey
- 1996 IPC Ice Sledge Hockey World Championships
- Ice sledge hockey at the 2002 Winter Paralympics
- 2004 IPC Ice Sledge Hockey World Championships
- Ice sledge hockey at the 2006 Winter Paralympics
- 2008 IPC Ice Sledge Hockey World Championships
