= 2004 IPC Ice Sledge Hockey World Championships =

Tournament details
- Host country: Sweden
- Venue(s): 1 (in 1 host city)
- Dates: April 13–24, 2004
- Teams: 8

Final positions
- Champions: Norway

Tournament statistics
- Games played: 20
- Goals scored: 85 (4.25 per game)

The 2004 IPC Ice Sledge Hockey World Championships was the third IPC Ice Sledge Hockey World Championships held between April 13, 2004 and April 24, 2004 at Kempehallen in Örnsköldsvik, Sweden. Örnsköldsvik was also the host of the first Paralympic Winter Games in 1976. Participating countries: 104 athletes from eight nations Canada, Estonia, Germany, Great Britain, Japan, Norway, Sweden, United States. The USA, Norway and Sweden were automatically qualified for their performance at the Salt Lake 2002 Paralympic Winter Games, while the other five teams were selected through regional championships.

== Final rankings ==
( Rosters are not yet complete )

Gold	Silver	Bronze	4th	5th	6th
Norway Eskil Hagen; Atle Haglund; Lloyd Remi Johansen; Roger Johansen; Rolf Einar Pedersen; Tommy Rovelstad; Kjell Vidar Røyne; Geir Arne Skogstad; Stig Tore Svee; Arne Vik; Morten Værnes	United States Dave Conklin; Bradley Emmerson; Manuel Guerra Jr. Lonnie Hannah; Joe Howard; Ahmad Karimzada; Andrew "Taylor" Lipsett; Christopher Manns; Bruce Nelson; Alexi Salamone; Francis "Kip" St. Germaine Sweden Björn Ferber C Aron Andersson; Magnus Carlsson; Marcus Holm; Niklas Ingvarsson; Kenth Jonsson; Göran Karlsson; Jens Kask; Peter Melander; Leif Norgren; Frank Pedersen	Canada Jeremy Booker; Bradley Bowden; Billy Bridges; Marc Dorion; Raymond Grassi; Jean Labonte; Herve Lord; Shawn Matheson; Graeme Murray; Todd Nicholson; Mark Noot; Paul Rosen; Benoit St.Amand; Dany Verner; Greg Westlake	Great Britain Ian Warner C Richard Whitehead; Nathan Stephens; Karl Nicholson; Russell Willey; David French; Steven Thomas A Simon James Berry A Mark Briggs; Gary Farmer; Phil Saunders; Gary Vaughan; Matt Lloyd	Japan Takayuki Endo; Shinobu Fukushima; Tadanobu Go; Naohiko Ishida; Tadashi Kato; Taku Kobiyama; Mitsuru Nagase; Kanichi Naito; Mamoru Ogiso; Taimei Shiba; Satoru Sudo; Kazuhiro Takahashi; Toshifumi Takeuchi; Daisuke Uehara; Mamoru Yoshikawa C	

- 7th Germany ( Gerd Bleidorn, Marius Hattendorf, Sebastian Kessler, Robert Pabst, Raimund Patzelt, Udo Segreff, Head coach: Michael Gursinsky, Coach: Wolfgang Kempe )
- 8th Estonia ( Valeri Falkenberg, Vladimir Karandašev, Ivar Liiv, Andrei Sokolov, Vladimir Savolainen, Sergei Vesselov, Kaido Kalm C, Aleksander Jarlõkov, Arvi Piirioja, Imre Tiitsu, Tarmo Eerma, Maksim Vedernikov, Jüri Tammleht, Head coach: Nikolai Lopassov, Coach: Olle Sildre )

== Preliminary round ==
=== Group A ===
Team	Pld	W	D	L	GF	GA	GD	Pts	USA	CAN	JPN	GBR
United States	3	3	0	0	9	5	+4	9	—	2–1	4–3	3–1
Canada	3	2	0	1	14	3	+11	6	1–2	—	6–1	7–0
Japan	3	1	0	2	6	10	−4	3	3–4	1–6	—	2–0
Great Britain	3	0	0	3	1	12	−11	0	1–3	0–7	0–2	—

Schedule

All times are local (UTC+2)

April 17, 2004; 11:00 (UTC+2)	United States	3 – 1 ( 0 - 1, 3 - 0, 0 - 0 )	Great Britain	Kempehallen, Örnsköldsvik

April 17, 2004; 17:00 (UTC+2)	Canada	6 – 1 ( 2 - 0, 1 - 0, 3 - 1 )	Japan	Kempehallen, Örnsköldsvik

April 18, 2004; 11:00 (UTC+2)	Canada	7 – 0 ( 1 - 0, 4 - 0, 2 - 0 )	Great Britain	Kempehallen, Örnsköldsvik

April 18, 2004; 20:00 (UTC+2)	Japan	3 – 4 ( 1 - 0, 1 - 1, 1 - 3 )	United States	Kempehallen, Örnsköldsvik

April 19, 2004; 14:00 (UTC+2)	Great Britain	0 – 2 ( 0 - 1, 0 - 1, 0 - 0 )	Japan	Kempehallen, Örnsköldsvik

April 19, 2004; 17:00 (UTC+2)	United States	2 – 1 ( 0 - 0, 0 - 1, 2 - 0 )	Canada	Kempehallen, Örnsköldsvik

=== Group B ===
Team	Pld	W	D	L	GF	GA	GD	Pts	NOR	SWE	GER	EST
Norway	3	3	0	0	13	1	+12	9	—	3–1	6–0	4–0
Sweden	3	1	1	1	7	7	0	4	1–3	—	3–1	3–3
Germany	3	1	0	2	4	11	−7	3	0–6	1–3	—	3–2
Estonia	3	0	1	2	5	10	−5	1	0–4	3–3	2–3	—

Schedule

All times are local (UTC+2)

April 17, 2004; 14:00 (UTC+2)	Norway	6 – 0 ( 3 - 0, 2 - 0, 1 - 0 )	Germany	Kempehallen, Örnsköldsvik

April 17, 2004; 20:00 (UTC+2)	Sweden	3 – 3 ( 2 - 0, 0 - 1, 1 - 2 )	Estonia	Kempehallen, Örnsköldsvik

Goals / 31:00 V. Savolainen; 39.00 V. Savolainen; 43:00 M. Vedernikov

April 18, 2004; 14:00 (UTC+2)	Estonia	0 – 4 ( 0 - 1, 0 - 2, 0 - 1 )	Norway	Kempehallen, Örnsköldsvik

April 18, 2004; 17:00 (UTC+2)	Sweden	3 – 1 ( 0 - 0, 1 - 1, 2 - 0 )	Germany	Kempehallen, Örnsköldsvik

April 19, 2004; 11:00 (UTC+2)	Germany	3 – 2 ( 0 - 1, 2 - 0, 1 - 1 )	Estonia	Kempehallen, Örnsköldsvik

S. Kessler 15:31, 40:00; U. Segreff 19:00 / Goals / I. Tiitsu

April 19, 2004; 20:00 (UTC+2)	Norway	3 – 1 ( 1 - 0, 1 - 1, 1 - 0 )	Sweden	Kempehallen, Örnsköldsvik

== Final round ==
5th to 8th Place Playoff

April 21, 2004; 16:00 (UTC+2)	Japan A3	2 – 0 ( 1 - 0, 0 - 0, 1 - 0 )	B4 Estonia	Kempehallen, Örnsköldsvik

April 21, 2004; 20:00 (UTC+2)	Germany B3	4 – 5 ( 0 - 0, 3 - 0, 0 - 3, 0 - 0 SD, 4 - 5 Penalty shots )	A4 Great Britain	Kempehallen, Örnsköldsvik

Semifinals

April 22, 2004; 16:00 (UTC+2)	United States A1	2 – 0 ( 0 - 0, 1 - 0, 1 - 0 )	B2 Sweden	Kempehallen, Örnsköldsvik

April 22, 2004; 20:00 (UTC+2)	Norway B1	1 – 0 ( 0 - 0, 0 - 0, 0 - 0, 1 - 0 SD )	A2 Canada	Kempehallen, Örnsköldsvik

7th Place Playoff

April 23, 2004; 16:00 (UTC+2)	Estonia	2 – 3 ( 0 - 2, 1 - 1, 1 - 0 )	Germany	Kempehallen, Örnsköldsvik

Goals / S. Kessler; R. Patzelt; U. Segreff

5th Place Playoff

April 23, 2004; 20:00 (UTC+2)	Japan	0 – 1 ( 0 - 1, 0 - 0, 0 - 0 )	Great Britain	Kempehallen, Örnsköldsvik

Bronze Medal Game

April 24, 2004; 12:00 (UTC+2)	Sweden	3 – 0 ( 2 - 0, 1 - 0, 0 - 0 )	Canada	Kempehallen, Örnsköldsvik

P. Melander; A. Andersson; M. Holm / Goals

Gold Medal Game

April 24, 2004; 16:00 (UTC+2)	United States	1 – 2 ( 1 - 0, 0 - 0, 0 - 2 )	Norway	Kempehallen, Örnsköldsvik

J. Howard 00:23 (ES) / Goals / 37:00 (ES) R. Pedresen; 43:00 (ES) T. Rovelstad

== See also ==
- Ice sledge hockey
- Ice hockey#Sledge hockey
- Ice sledge hockey at the 2006 Winter Paralympics
- 2008 IPC Ice Sledge Hockey World Championships
- 1976 First winter Paralympics in Örnsköldsvik, Sweden
