= Ice sledge hockey at the 1998 Winter Paralympics =

1998 Winter Paralympics
Tournament details
- Host country: Japan
- Venue: Aqua Wing Arena
- Dates: 5–14 March 1998
- Teams: 7

Final positions
- Champions: Norway (1st title)
- Runners-up: Canada
- Third place: Sweden
- Fourth place: Estonia

Tournament statistics
- Games played: 15
- Goals scored: 66 (4.4 per game)

Ice sledge hockey at the 1998 Winter Paralympics consisted of a men's event.

== Medal summary ==
Event	Gold	Silver	Bronze
Men	Norway (NOR) Helge Bjørnstad; Knut Erling Granaas; Eskil Hagen; Atle Haglund; John Jenshagen; Stig Kjolnes; Kjetil Korbu Nilsen; Hans Christian Norseth; Rolf Einar Øyen; Tommy Rovelstad; Erik Sandbraaten; Stig Tore Svee; Morten Syversen; Arne Vik	Canada (CAN) Yves Joseph Carrier; Dean Emmett Delaurier; Hugh David Eamer; Jamie Eddy; Angelo Gavillucci; Jean Labonte; Daniel Labrie; Robert Lionel Lagace; Herve Lord; Warren Martin; Shawn Matheson; Dean Mellway; Todd Nicholson; Pierre Pichette; Dany Verner	Sweden (SWE) Sten Dumell; Jan Edbom; Marcus Holm; Niklas Ingvarsson; Rasmus Isaksson; Bengt-Arne Johansson; Bengt-Gösta Johansson; Rolf Johansson; Kenth Jonsson; Göran Karlsson; Jens Kask; Joakim Larsson; Leif Norgren; Mats Nyman; Leif Wahlstedt

== Preliminary round ==
All times are local (UTC+9).

=== Group A ===
Pos	Team	Pld	W	D	L	GF	GA	GD	Pts	Qualification
1	Sweden	2	2	0	0	13	3	+10	4	Semifinals
2	Estonia	2	1	0	1	9	6	+3	2	Semifinals
3	Great Britain	2	0	0	2	0	13	−13	0	Placement round

6 March 1998; 13:30	Estonia	6–0	Great Britain	Aqua Wing Arena, Nagano

8 March 1998; 13:30	Sweden	6–3	Estonia	Aqua Wing Arena, Nagano

12 March 1998; 18:30	Sweden	7–0	Great Britain	Aqua Wing Arena, Nagano

=== Group B ===
Pos	Team	Pld	W	D	L	GF	GA	GD	Pts	Qualification
1	Norway	3	3	0	0	7	1	+6	6	Semifinals
2	Canada	3	1	1	1	5	4	+1	3	Semifinals
3	Japan (H)	3	1	0	2	2	6	−4	2	Placement round
4	United States	3	0	1	2	2	5	−3	1	Placement round

(H) Hosts

5 March 1998; 11:30	Norway	2–0	Japan	Aqua Wing Arena, Nagano

5 March 1998; 13:30	Canada	1–1	United States	Aqua Wing Arena, Nagano

10 March 1998; 13:30	Norway	2–0	United States	Aqua Wing Arena, Nagano

10 March 1998; 18:30	Canada	3–0	Japan	Aqua Wing Arena, Nagano

12 March 1998; 11:00	Norway	3–1	Canada	Aqua Wing Arena, Nagano

12 March 1998; 13:30	Japan	2–1	United States	Aqua Wing Arena, Nagano

== Placement round ==
Pos	Team	Pld	W	D	L	GF	GA	GD	Pts
5	Japan (H)	2	1	1	0	2	1	+1	3
6	United States	2	1	0	1	8	2	+6	2
7	Great Britain	2	0	1	1	0	7	−7	1

(H) Hosts

13 March 1998; 11:00	Japan	0–0	Great Britain	Aqua Wing Arena, Nagano

13 March 1998; 16:00	United States	7–0	Great Britain	Aqua Wing Arena, Nagano

== Medal round ==
=== Bracket ===
Semifinals
13 March
Sweden	1
Canada	2
13 March
Norway	4
Estonia	1

Gold medal game
14 March
Canada	0
Norway	2
Bronze medal game
14 March
Sweden	10
Estonia	1

=== Semifinals ===
13 March 1998; 13:30	Sweden	1–2	Canada	Aqua Wing Arena, Nagano

13 March 1998; 18:30	Norway	4–1	Estonia	Aqua Wing Arena, Nagano

=== Bronze medal game ===
14 March 1998; 10:00	Sweden	10–1	Estonia	Aqua Wing Arena, Nagano

=== Gold medal game ===
14 March 1998; 13:00	Canada	0–2	Norway	Aqua Wing Arena, Nagano
