= Canada at the 2010 Winter Paralympics =

- Flag of Canada
- IPC code: CAN
- NPC: Canadian Paralympic Committee
- Website: www.paralympic.ca

in Vancouver
- Competitors: 46 in 5 sports
- Flag bearers: Jean Labonte (opening); Lauren Woolstencroft (closing)
- Medals Ranked 3rd: Gold 10 Silver 5 Bronze 4 Total 19

Winter Paralympics appearances (overview)
- 1976; 1980; 1984; 1988; 1992; 1994; 1998; 2002; 2006; 2010; 2014; 2018; 2022; 2026

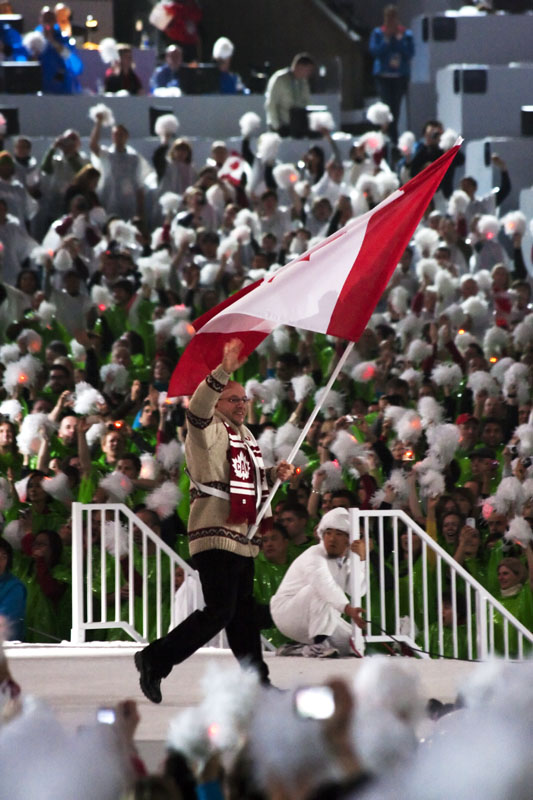
Flag bearer Jean Labonté, as the Canadian delegation is entering the stadium during the opening ceremony.

Canada was the host country of the 2010 Winter Paralympics, in Vancouver, the first time it had hosted the Winter Paralympics.

The 2010 Winter Paralympics was the most successful Winter Paralympics for Canada, through 2010. It collected the most total medals and most gold medals of any Winter Paralympics up until then. Canada ended the Games with 19 total medals, 10 of them gold, ending at 3rd in total medals ranking, and 3rd in gold medal ranking. This met the performance level set by the Canadian Paralympic Committee, of ending third in total medal count.

Canadian cross-country skier Brian McKeever, who would have competed at the 2010 Winter Olympics, would have been the first athlete ever to compete both at both the Winter Olympics and the Winter Paralympics. However, his coach cut him two days before the competition so McKeever will in fact not set an Olympic record. McKeever will compete in cross-country and biathlon events at the Winter Paralympics, with his brother Robin as his guide.

Viviane Forest became the first para-athlete to win a gold in both the Winter and Summer Games, by winning the Women's Downhill for Visually Impaired. She had previously won gold in the 2000 and 2004 Summer Paralympics for women's goalball.

Lauren Woolstencroft became the first Canadian to win 3 golds at the same Winter Paralympics, this was eventually upped to 5 golds. With her 4th gold medal, she helped Canada set a record for most gold medals at any Winter Paralympic Games by winning the 7th medal. The previous mark was six, set at the 2002 Salt Lake City Paralympics. With her 5th gold medal, she set the record for most gold medals won by any Winter Paralympian at a single Games, and she tied the record for gold medal haul of any Canadian Paralympian at a single Games, tying Chantal Petitclerc (who did the feat twice) and Stephanie Dixon, both Summer Paralympians. Her five gold are also the record for any Canadian Winter Paralympian or Olympian.

== Medallists ==
Medal	Name	Sport	Event	Date
Gold	Brian McKeever; Guide: Robin McKeever	Cross-country skiing	Men's 20 km free, visually impaired	March 15
Gold	Lauren Woolstencroft	Alpine skiing	Women's slalom, standing	March 15
Gold	Lauren Woolstencroft	Alpine skiing	Women's giant slalom, standing	March 17
Gold	Brian McKeever; Guide: Robin McKeever	Cross-country skiing	Men's 10 km classic, visually impaired	March 18
Gold	Viviane Forest; Guide: Lindsay Debou	Alpine skiing	Women's downhill, visually impaired	March 18
Gold	Lauren Woolstencroft	Alpine skiing	Women's downhill, standing	March 18
Gold	Lauren Woolstencroft	Alpine skiing	Women's super-G, standing	March 19
Gold	Lauren Woolstencroft	Alpine skiing	Women's Super combined, standing	March 20
Gold	Jim Armstrong, Darryl Neighbour, Ina Forrest, Sonja Gaudet, Bruno Yizek	Wheelchair curling	Wheelchair curling	March 20
Gold	Brian McKeever; Guide: Robin McKeever	Cross-country skiing	Men's 1 km sprint, visually impaired	March 21
Silver	Colette Bourgonje	Cross-country skiing	Women's 10 km free, sitting	March 14
Silver	Viviane Forest; Guide: Lindsay Debou	Alpine skiing	Women's slalom, visually impaired	March 14
Silver	Josh Dueck	Alpine skiing	Men's slalom, sitting	March 14
Silver	Viviane Forest; Guide: Lindsay Debou	Alpine skiing	Women's super-G, visually impaired	March 19
Silver	Viviane Forest; Guide: Lindsay Debou	Alpine skiing	Women's Super combined, visually impaired	March 20
Bronze	Karolina Wisniewska	Alpine skiing	Women's slalom, standing	March 15
Bronze	Viviane Forest; Guide: Lindsay Debou	Alpine skiing	Women's giant slalom, visually impaired	March 16
Bronze	Colette Bourgonje	Cross-country skiing	Women's 5 km classic, sitting	March 18
Bronze	Karolina Wisniewska	Alpine skiing	Women's Super combined, standing	March 20

== Alpine skiing ==
Women

Athlete	Event	Run 1 (SG)			Run 2 (Sl)			Final/Total		
Athlete	Event	Time	Diff	Rank	Time	Diff	Rank	Time	Diff	Rank
Andrea Dziewior	Downhill, standing							1:37.53	+11.99	9
Andrea Dziewior	Slalom, standing	1:13.77	+17.59	18	1:07.72	+11.93	14	2:21.49	+29.52	15
Andrea Dziewior	Giant slalom, standing	did not start								
Andrea Dziewior	Super-G, standing							did not start		
Arly Fogarty	Slalom, standing	disqualified								
Arly Fogarty	Giant slalom, standing	1:28.90	+13.28	12	1:26.68	+8.27	9	2:55.58	+21.55	11
Arly Fogarty	Super-G, standing							did not start		
Viviane Forest; Guide: Lindsay Debou	Downhill, visually impaired							1:27.51	0.00	1st place, gold medalist(s)
Viviane Forest; Guide: Lindsay Debou	Slalom, visually impaired	56.76	+0.86	2	1:04.69	+0.03	2	2:01.45	+0.89	2nd place, silver medalist(s)
Viviane Forest; Guide: Lindsay Debou	Giant slalom, visually impaired	1:35.03	+9.59	4	1:36.14	+4.93	4	3:11.17	+14.52	3rd place, bronze medalist(s)
Viviane Forest; Guide: Lindsay Debou	Super-G, visually impaired							1:37.54	+3.73	2nd place, silver medalist(s)
Viviane Forest; Guide: Lindsay Debou	Super combined, visually impaired	1:35.97	+0.71	2	59.97	+0.62	2	2:35.94	+1.33	2nd place, silver medalist(s)
Melanie Schwartz	Slalom, standing	1:08.92	+12.74	14	1:06.39	+10.60	13	2:15.31	+23.34	13
Melanie Schwartz	Giant slalom, standing	1:30.42	+14.80	13	1:29.05	+10.64	12	2:59.47	+25.44	12
Melanie Schwartz	Super-G, standing							2:11.23	+44.77	14
Melanie Schwartz	Super combined, standing	1:46.26	+19.42	11	1:08.25	+12.42	10	2:54.51	+31.84	10
Karolina Wisniewska	Downhill, standing							1:30.82	+5.28	5
Karolina Wisniewska	Slalom, standing	59.76	+3.58	4	59.08	+3.29	3	1:58.84	+6.87	3rd place, bronze medalist(s)
Karolina Wisniewska	Giant slalom, standing	1:21.95	+6.33	4	1:22.08	+3.67	4	2:44.03	+10.00	4
Karolina Wisniewska	Super-G, standing							1:36.22	+9.76	7
Karolina Wisniewska	Super combined, standing	1:35.21	+8.37	3	1:00.26	+4.43	5	2:35.47	+12.80	3rd place, bronze medalist(s)
Lauren Woolstencroft	Downhill, standing							1:25.54	0.00	1st place, gold medalist(s)
Lauren Woolstencroft	Slalom, standing	56.18	0.00	1	55.79	0.00	1	1:51.97	0.00	1st place, gold medalist(s)
Lauren Woolstencroft	Giant slalom, standing	1:15.62	0.00	1	1:18.41	0.00	1	2:34.03	0.00	1st place, gold medalist(s)
Lauren Woolstencroft	Super-G, standing							1:26.46	0.00	1st place, gold medalist(s)
Lauren Woolstencroft	Super combined, standing	1:26.84	0.00	1	55.83	0.00	1	2:22.67	0.00	1st place, gold medalist(s)

Men

Athlete	Event	Run 1 (SG)			Run 2 (Sl)			Final/Total		
Athlete	Event	Time	Diff	Rank	Time	Diff	Rank	Time	Diff	Rank
Sam Carter Danniels	Downhill, sitting							did not finish		
Sam Carter Danniels	Super-G, sitting							did not start		
Jeff Dickson	Downhill, standing							did not finish		
Jeff Dickson	Slalom, standing	did not start								
Jeff Dickson	Giant slalom, standing	1:18.73	+6.93	19	1:19.45	+7.33	20	2:38.18	+14.26	T-18
Jeff Dickson	Super-G, standing							1:27.83	+7.72	16
Josh Dueck	Downhill, sitting							1:19.88	+1.69	5
Josh Dueck	Slalom, sitting	49.59	+2.02	4	56.70	+4.03	2	1:46.29	+4.66	2nd place, silver medalist(s)
Josh Dueck	Super-G, sitting							1:25.66	+5.68	13
Josh Dueck	Super combined, sitting	1:26.68	+6.06	11	disqualified					
Matt Hallat	Downhill, standing							1:25.44	+4.64	11
Matt Hallat	Slalom, standing	57.19	+6.24	17	1:07.01	+14.41	34	2:04.20	+18.80	31
Matt Hallat	Giant slalom, standing	did not start								
Matt Hallat	Super-G, standing							1:28.16	+8.05	18
Matt Hallat	Super combined, standing	did not finish								
Morgan Perrin	Downhill, standing							1:26.52	+5.72	T-15
Morgan Perrin	Giant slalom, standing	1:19.22	+7.42	20	1:20.24	+8.12	21	2:39.46	+15.54	21
Morgan Perrin	Super-G, standing							1:29.15	+9.04	20
Kirk Schornstein	Slalom, standing	58.40	+7.45	23	59.61	+7.01	27	1:58.01	+12.61	25
Kirk Schornstein	Giant slalom, standing	1:22.11	+10.31	25	1:23.27	+11.15	27	2:45.38	+21.46	T-25
Kirk Schornstein	Super-G, standing							1:31.65	+11.54	26
Chris Williamson; Guide: Nick Brush	Downhill, visually impaired							did not start		
Chris Williamson; Guide: Nick Brush	Slalom, visually impaired	52.93	+3.05	8	58.19	+2.78	5	1:51.12	+5.30	6
Chris Williamson; Guide: Nick Brush	Giant slalom, visually impaired	1:21.81	+2.44	5	1:22.84	+0.41	4	2:44.65	+2.66	4
Chris Williamson; Guide: Nick Brush	Super-G, visually impaired							1:23.74	+2.19	6
Chris Williamson; Guide: Nick Brush	Super combined, visually impaired	1:27.95	+4.10	6	50.47	0.00	1	2:18.42	+3.81	4

== Biathlon ==
Women

Athlete	Events	Factor %	Qualification					Final				
Athlete	Events	Factor %	Real Time	Calculated Time	Missed Shots	Result	Rank	Real Time	Calculated Time	Missed Shots	Result	Rank
Jody Barber	3km pursuit, standing	97	11:54.59	11:33.15	0+2	12:13.15	9			1+0	14:41.2	10
Jody Barber	12.5km individual, standing	97						50:37.6	49:06.5	2+0+0+0	51:06.5	7
Margarita Gorbounova; Guide: Robert d'Arras	3km pursuit, visually impaired	100	14:51.15	14:51.15	1+3	16:11.15	11	did not qualify				11
Courtney Knight; Guide: Andrea Bundon	3km pursuit, visually impaired	100	14:14.97	14:14.97	1+1	14:54.97	9	did not qualify				9
Robbi Weldon; Guide: Brian Berry	3km pursuit, visually impaired	98	12:34.74	12:19.65	3+3	14:19.65	6			4+5	20:34.7	6
Robbi Weldon; Guide: Brian Berry	12.5km individual, visually impaired	98						50:59.2	49:58.0	2+2+3+3	59:58.0	9

Men

Athlete	Events	Factor %	Qualification					Final				
Athlete	Events	Factor %	Real Time	Calculated Time	Missed Shots	Result	Rank	Real Time	Calculated Time	Missed Shots	Result	Rank
Mark Arendz	3km pursuit, standing	96	9:22.36	8:59.87	2+0	9:39.87	7			1+3	11:32.0	7
Mark Arendz	12.5km individual, standing	96						42:34.8	40:52.6	2+1+3+3	49:52.6	16
Lou Gibson	2.4km pursuit, sitting	100	10:00.26	10:00.26	2+3	11:40.26	23	did not qualify				23
Lou Gibson	12.5km individual, sitting	100						48:38.8	48:38.8	1+1+2+1	53:38.8	18
Brian McKeever; Guide: Robin McKeever	3km pursuit, visually impaired	100	9:54.30	9:54.30	0+1	10:14.30	6			0+3	12:02.7	6
Brian McKeever; Guide: Robin McKeever	12.5km individual, visually impaired	100						did not start				
Alexei Novikov; Guide: Jamie Stirling	3km pursuit, visually impaired	100	12:11.20	12:11.20	1+3	13:31.20	13	did not qualify				13
Alexei Novikov; Guide: Jamie Stirling	12.5km individual, visually impaired	100						51:30.2	51:30.2	1+1+2+1	56:30.2	10

== Cross-country skiing ==
Women

Athlete	Event	Factor %	Qualification			Semifinal		Final		
Athlete	Event	Factor %	Real Time	Result	Rank	Result	Rank	Real Time	Result	Rank
Jody Barber	1 km sprint classic, standing	92	5:04.91	4:40.52	9	did not qualify				9
Jody Barber	5km classic, standing	92						19:34.3	18:00.4	6
Jody Barber	15km free, standing	92						57:20.2	55:37.0	6
Mary Benson	1 km sprint classic, standing	85	5:41.60	4:50.36	12	did not qualify				12
Mary Benson	5km classic, standing	85						23:46.3	20:12.4	14
Mary Benson	15km free, standing	85						did not finish		
Colette Bourgonje	1 km sprint classic, sitting	86	3:13.54	2:46.44	10	did not qualify				10
Colette Bourgonje	5km classic, sitting	86						17:45.6	15:16.4	3rd place, bronze medalist(s)
Colette Bourgonje	10km free, sitting	86						37:00.7	31:49.8	2nd place, silver medalist(s)
Margarita Gorbounova; Guide: Robert d'Arras	1 km sprint classic, visually impaired	100	4:44.19	4:44.19	9	did not qualify				9
Margarita Gorbounova; Guide: Robert d'Arras	5km classic, visually impaired	100						20:16.5	20:16.5	12
Margarita Gorbounova; Guide: Robert d'Arras	15km free, visually impaired	100						1:01:59.1	1:01:59.1	7
Courtney Knight; Guide: Andrea Bundon	1 km sprint classic, visually impaired	100	4:40.66	4:40.66	8	4:49.6	4	did not advance		8
Courtney Knight; Guide: Andrea Bundon	5km classic, visually impaired	100						20:12.7	20:12.7	11
Courtney Knight; Guide: Andrea Bundon	15km free, visually impaired	100						did not start		
Robbi Weldon; Guide: Brian Berry	1 km sprint classic, visually impaired	98	4:24.52	4:19.23	5	4:23.8	3	did not advance		5
Robbi Weldon; Guide: Brian Berry	5km classic, visually impaired	98						18:02.6	17:40.9	6
Robbi Weldon; Guide: Brian Berry	15km free, visually impaired	98						54:42.6	53:36.9	5

Men

Athlete	Event	Factor %	Qualification			Semifinal		Final		
Athlete	Event	Factor %	Real Time	Result	Rank	Result	Rank	Real Time	Result	Rank
Mark Arendz	1 km sprint classic, standing	91	3:49.51	3:28.85	9	did not qualify				9
Mark Arendz	10km classic, standing	91						32:42.4	29:45.8	12
Mark Arendz	20km free, standing	91						did not start		
Sebastien Fortier	1 km sprint classic, sitting	98	2:39.56	2:36.37	32	did not qualify				32
Sebastien Fortier	10km classic, sitting	98						34:01.3	33:20.5	33
Sebastien Fortier	15km free, sitting	98						52:36.7	51:33.6	29
Lou Gibson	1 km sprint classic, sitting	100	2:30.53	2:30.53	29	did not qualify				29
Lou Gibson	10km classic, sitting	100						31:50.4	31:50.4	29
Lou Gibson	15km free, sitting	100						47:53.8	47:53.8	27
Tyler Mosher	1 km sprint classic, standing	94	4:02.22	3:47.69	21	did not qualify				21
Tyler Mosher	10km classic, standing	94						36:12.6	34:02.2	23
Tyler Mosher	20km free, standing	94						did not finish		
Brian McKeever; Guide: Robin McKeever	1 km sprint classic, visually impaired	100	3:14.79	3:14.79	1	3:20.6	1		3:42.9	1st place, gold medalist(s)
Brian McKeever; Guide: Robin McKeever	10km classic, visually impaired	100						26:01.6	26:01.6	1st place, gold medalist(s)
Brian McKeever; Guide: Robin McKeever	20km free, visually impaired	100						51:14.7	51:14.7	1st place, gold medalist(s)
Alexei Novikov; Guide: Jamie Stirling	1 km sprint classic, visually impaired	100	3:56.34	3:56.34	19	did not qualify				19
Alexei Novikov; Guide: Jamie Stirling	10km classic, visually impaired	100						35:21.9	35:21.9	14
Alexei Novikov; Guide: Jamie Stirling	20km free, visually impaired	100						1:08:47.6	1:08:47.6	13

== Ice sledge hockey ==
The Canadian sledge hockey team qualified for the 2010 Paralympics by winning the bronze medal at the 2009 IPC Ice Sledge Hockey World Championships.

=== Roster ===
No.	Pos.	Name	Height	Weight	Birthdate	Hometown	2008–09 team
22	G	Benoit St-Amand	5 ft 10 in (178 cm)	165 lb (75 kg)	19 April 1978	St-Hubert, QC	Team Canada
57	G	Paul Rosen	6 ft 0 in (183 cm)	205 lb (93 kg)	26 April 1960	Thornhill, ON	Team Canada
11	D	Adam Dixon	5 ft 9 in (175 cm)	168 lb (76 kg)	13 September 1989	Midland, ON	Team Canada
17	D	Jean Labonté	5 ft 11 in (180 cm)	205 lb (93 kg)	20 March 1969	Hull, QC	Team Canada
21	D	Raymond Grassi	6 ft 3 in (191 cm)	260 lb (120 kg)	11 February 1983	Windsor, ON	Team Canada
29	D	Graeme Murray	5 ft 5 in (165 cm)	190 lb (86 kg)	14 December 1984	Gravenhurst, ON	Team Canada
3	F	Hervé Lord	5 ft 5 in (165 cm)	150 lb (68 kg)	3 March 1958	St-Pamphile, QC	Team Canada
4	F	Derek Whitson	6 ft 1 in (185 cm)	165 lb (75 kg)	21 June 1989	Chatham, ON	Team Canada
7	F	Marc Dorion	5 ft 0 in (152 cm)	137 lb (62 kg)	22 June 1987	Bourget, ON	Team Canada
8	F	Jeremy Booker	5 ft 2 in (157 cm)	125 lb (57 kg)	8 November 1986	Ajax, ON	Team Canada
10	F	Shawn Matheson	5 ft 8 in (173 cm)	130 lb (59 kg)	6 May 1972	Chatham, NB	Team Canada
12	F	Greg Westlake	6 ft 2 in (188 cm)	170 lb (77 kg)	12 June 1986	Oakville, ON	Team Canada
18	F	Billy Bridges	5 ft 8 in (173 cm)	190 lb (86 kg)	22 March 1984	Summerside, PE	Team Canada
19	F	Todd Nicholson	6 ft 0 in (183 cm)	180 lb (82 kg)	28 January 1969	Kinburn, ON	Team Canada
27	F	Bradley Bowden	5 ft 0 in (152 cm)	154 lb (70 kg)	26 May 1983	Orton, ON	Team Canada

=== Preliminary round ===
==== Round robin ====
13 March 2010; 10:00	Canada	4 – 0 (1–0, 0–0, 3–0)	Italy	UBC Thunderbird Arena, Vancouver

Game reference

Paul Rosen
Goalies
Santino Stillitano

Dorion (Bridges) - 09:28	1 – 0
Westlake (Dixon, Labonté) - 34:50	2 – 0
Westlake (Bowden) - 38:48	3 – 0
Labonté - 39:18	4 – 0

8 min
Penalties
10 min
16
Shots
4

14 March 2010; 13:30	Canada	10 – 1 (4–1, 4–0, 2–0)	Sweden	UBC Thunderbird Arena, Vancouver

Game reference

Benoit St-Armand
Goalies
Ulf Nilsson

Bowden (Nicholson, Westlake) - 01:25	1 – 0
	1 – 1	01:38 - Ingvarsson
Westlake (Nicholson, Bowden) - 07:44	2 – 1
Dixon (Bridges) - 12:54	3 – 1
Bowden (Bridges, Westlake) - 13:47	4 – 1
Westlake (Dixon, Bridges) (PP) - 17:13	5 – 1
Dixon (Bowden, Bridges) (PP) - 22:16	6 – 1
Westlake (SH) - 25:28	7 – 1
Dorion (SH) - 26:33	8 – 1
Dorion (Nicholson) - 31:19	9 – 1
Dorion - 34:58	10 – 1

20 min
Penalties
6 min
32
Shots
3

16 March 2010; 20:30	Norway	0 – 5 (0–2, 0–3, 0–0)	Canada	UBC Thunderbird Arena, Vancouver

Game reference

Roger Johansen (out 26:05)
Kissinger Deng (in 26:05)
Goalies
Paul Rosen

0 – 1	00:31 - Bridges (Dixon, Bowden) (PP)
0 – 2	07:14 - Westlake (Bowden) (SH)
0 – 3	15:11 - Bowden (Murray)
0 – 4	18:46 - Westlake (Bowden, Bridges) (PP)
0 – 5	35:04 - Dixon (Labonté, Nicholson) (PP)

12 min
Penalties
10 min
12
Shots
8

==== Standings ====
Team	GP	W	OTW	OTL	L	GF	GA	GD	Pts
Canada	3	3	0	0	0	19	1	+18	9
Norway	3	1	1	0	1	4	7	−3	5
Sweden	3	1	0	1	1	3	12	−9	4
Italy	3	0	0	0	3	1	7	−6	0

=== Playoff round ===
==== Semifinal ====
18 March 2010; 12:00	Canada	1 – 3 (1–0, 0–1, 0–2)	Japan	UBC Thunderbird Arena, Vancouver

Game reference

Paul Rosen
Goalies
Mitsuru Nagase

Dorion (Booker, Grassi) - 09:56	1 – 0
	1 – 1	22:33 - Endo
	1 – 2	43:47 - Uehara (Takahashi)
	1 – 3	44:44 - Endo (EN)

12 min
Penalties
4 min
20
Shots
11

==== Bronze medal game ====
19 March 2010; 19:00	Canada	1 – 2 (0–0, 0–0, 1–2)	Norway (bronze)	UBC Thunderbird Arena, Vancouver

Game reference

Paul Rosen
Goalies
Roger Johansen

Dixon (Westlake) - 32:45	1 – 0
	1 – 1	36:08 - Pederson (PS)
	1 – 2	44:46 - Hagen

8 min
Penalties
12 min
18
Shots
12

== Wheelchair curling ==
=== Roster ===
Position	Name	Height	Weight	Birthdate	Birthplace
First	Sonja Gaudet	180 cm (5 ft 11 in)	66 kg (146 lb)	22 July 1966	North Vancouver, BC
Second	Ina Forrest	160 cm (5 ft 3 in)	61 kg (134 lb)	25 May 1962	Fort St. John, BC
Third	Darryl Neighbour	187 cm (6 ft 2 in)	100 kg (220 lb)	21 July 1948	Beaverlodge, AB
Fourth	Jim Armstrong (skip)	189 cm (6 ft 2 in)	125 kg (276 lb)	30 June 1950	Victoria, BC
Alternate	Bruno Yizek	177 cm (5 ft 10 in)	100 kg (220 lb)	10 December 1948	Cardston, AB

=== Preliminary round ===
==== Round robin ====
Draw 1 - Sheet B	1	2	3	4	5	6	7	8	Final
Great Britain (McCreadie)	1	0	0	0	0	1	0	x	2
Canada (Armstrong) 🔨	0	2	1	3	2	0	1	x	9

Draw 2 - Sheet D	1	2	3	4	5	6	7	8	Final
Canada (Armstrong)	0	4	2	2	0	2	0	x	10
United States (Perez) 🔨	2	0	0	0	1	0	2	x	5

Draw 3 - Sheet A	1	2	3	4	5	6	7	8	Final
Norway (Lorentsen) 🔨	1	1	1	0	0	2	0	0	5
Canada (Armstrong)	0	0	0	2	1	0	1	2	6

Draw 5 - Sheet C	1	2	3	4	5	6	7	8	Final
Japan (Nakajima) 🔨	0	0	0	1	0	1	0	x	2
Canada (Armstrong)	3	1	2	0	2	0	5	x	13

Draw 6 - Sheet D	1	2	3	4	5	6	7	8	Final
Sweden (Jungnell)	2	0	0	2	3	1	0	x	8
Canada (Armstrong) 🔨	0	2	1	0	0	0	1	x	4

Draw 7 - Sheet B	1	2	3	4	5	6	7	8	Final
Canada (Armstrong)	1	0	2	5	1	6	x	x	15
Switzerland (Bolliger) 🔨	0	1	0	0	0	0	x	x	1

Draw 9 - Sheet B	1	2	3	4	5	6	7	8	Final
Canada (Armstrong)	0	2	4	0	1	1	0	0	8
Germany (Jaeger) 🔨	1	0	0	1	0	0	3	1	6

Draw 10 - Sheet C	1	2	3	4	5	6	7	8	Final
Canada (Armstrong) 🔨	1	1	0	1	0	2	0	1	6
South Korea (Kim)	0	0	1	0	2	0	1	0	4

Draw 12 - Sheet D	1	2	3	4	5	6	7	8	Final
Italy (Tabanelli)	1	0	2	0	0	4	0	1	8
Canada (Armstrong) 🔨	0	1	0	2	2	0	2	0	7

==== Standings ====
Country	Skip	W	L
Canada	Jim Armstrong	7	2
United States	Augusto Perez	7	2
South Korea	Haksung Kim	6	3
Sweden	Jalle Jungnell	5	4
Italy	Andrea Tabanelli	5	4
Japan	Yoji Nakajima	3	6
Germany	Jens Jaeger	3	6
Norway	Rune Lorentzen	3	6
Switzerland	Manfred Bolliger	3	6
Great Britain	Michael McCreadie	3	6

=== Playoffs ===
==== Semifinal ====
Team	1	2	3	4	5	6	7	8	Final
Sweden (Jungnell)	0	1	0	0	3	1	0	x	5
Canada (Armstrong) 🔨	3	0	2	3	0	0	2	x	10

==== Gold medal game ====
Team	1	2	3	4	5	6	7	8	Final
(gold) Canada (Armstrong) 🔨	3	1	0	4	0	0	0	0	8
(silver) South Korea (Kim)	0	0	1	0	2	2	1	1	7

== See also ==
- Canada at the 2010 Winter Olympics
- Canada at the Paralympics
