= Norway men's national ice sledge hockey team =

Norway
- Association: NIHF
- General manager: Kent Nyholt
- Head coach: Morten Haglund
- Assistants: Frank Dahlstrøm; Espen Hegde
- Team colors
Home colours	Away colours

Paralympics
- Appearances: 5 (first in 1994)
- Medals: Gold: 1 – 1998 Silver: 3 – 1994, 2002, 2006 Bronze: 1 – 2010

World Para Ice Hockey Championships
- Appearances: 10 (first in 1996)
- Best result: (gold) Gold: 1 – 2004; (silver) Silver: 4 – 1996, 2000, 2008, 2009

Paralympic medal record

Paralympic Games
Silver medal – second place	1994 Lillehammer	Team
Gold medal – first place	1998 Nagano	Team
Silver medal – second place	2002 Salt Lake	Team
Silver medal – second place	2006 Torino	Team
Bronze medal – third place	2010 Vancouver	Team

World Championships medal record

World Championships
Silver medal – second place	1996 Sweden	Norway
Silver medal – second place	2000 United States	Norway
Gold medal – first place	2004 Sweden	Norway
Silver medal – second place	2008 United States	Norway
Silver medal – second place	2009 Netherlands/ Czech Republic	Norway

The Norway national ice sledge hockey team is the national team that represents Norway at international ice sledge hockey competitions. Since 2004, the team has been overseen by the Norwegian Ice Hockey Federation (NIHF) a member of the International Ice Hockey Federation.

== Tournament record ==
=== Performance in Paralympic Games ===
- 1994 – Silver
- 1998 – Gold
- 2002 – Silver
- 2006 – Silver
- 2010 – Bronze
- 2014 – 4th
- 2018 – 5th
- 2022 – Did not qualify
- 2026 –

=== Performance in World Championship ===
- 1996 – Silver
- 2000 – Silver
- 2004 – Gold
- 2008 – Silver
- 2009 – Silver
- 2012 – 5th
- 2013 – 5th
- 2015 – 4th
- 2017 – 4th
- 2019 – 5th
- 2021 – 6th
- 2023 – 7th (Relegated)
- 2024 – Pool B 1st (promoted)
- 2025 – 8th (Relegated)

=== Performance in European Championship ===
- 2007 - Gold
- 2011 - Bronze
- 2016 - Bronze

== Rosters ==
=== 2011 IPC European Championship roster ===
#1 Roger Johansen (G), No. 5 Kjell Christian Hamar (G), No. 3 Rolf Einar Pedersen (D), No. 6 Tor Joakim Rivera (F), No. 8 Stig Tore Svee (F), No. 9 Morten Værnes (D), No. 11 Helge Bjørnstad (F), No. 12 Magnus Bøgle (F), No. 16 Knut Andre Nordstoga (F), No. 17 Loyd Remi Johansen (F), No. 21 Ole Bjarte Austevoll (D), No. 22 Audun Bakke (F), No. 23 Jan Roger Klakegg (F), No. 85 Thomas Jacobsen (F).

=== 2010 Paralympics roster ===
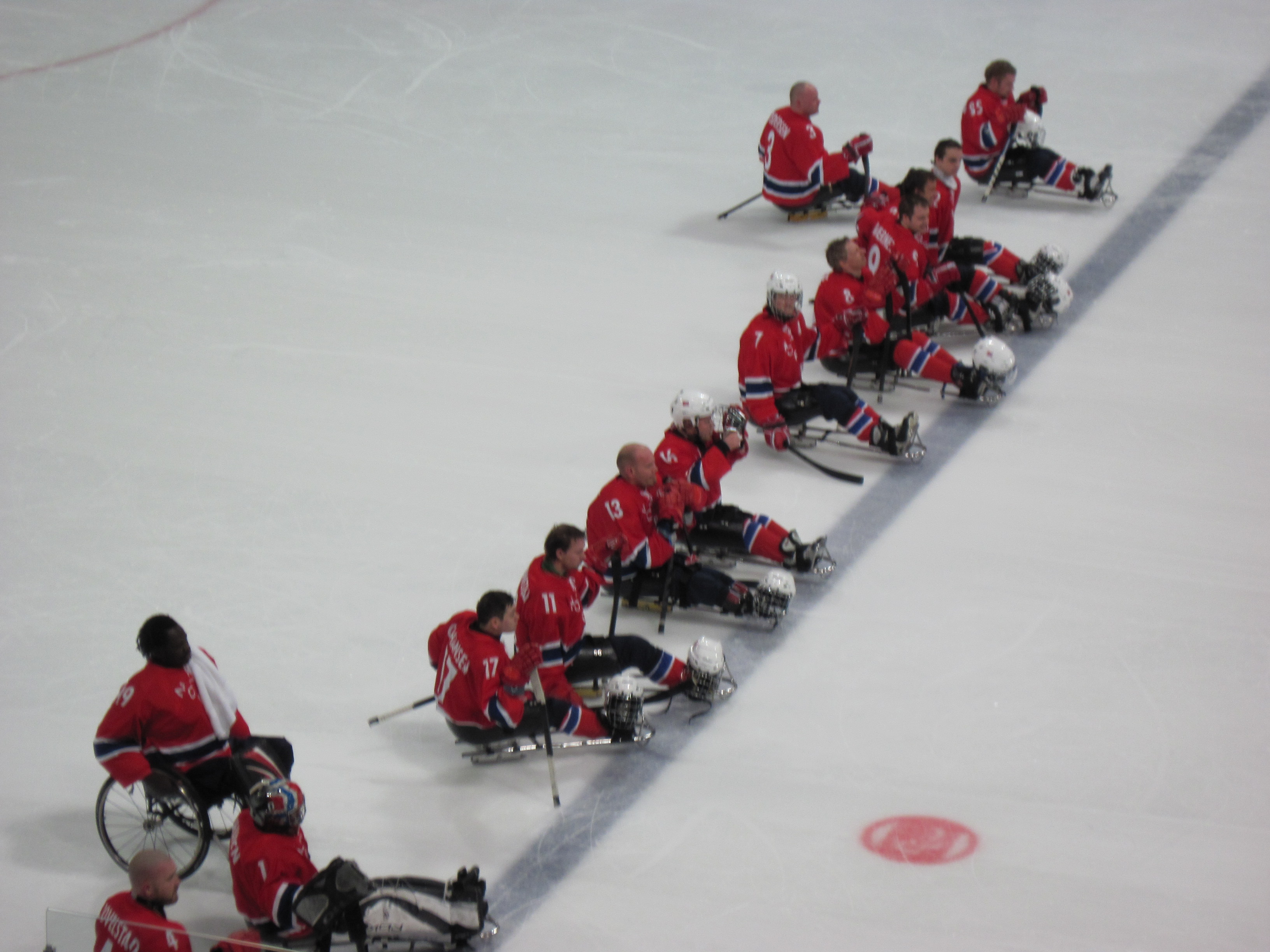
Norway's Ice Sledge Hockey team, Vancouver 2010

The following is the Norwegian roster in the men's ice sledge hockey tournament of the 2010 Winter Paralympics. A music video with the Norway National Sledge Hockey Team was released in 2010, with the team song "Et halvt bein i finalen" (Half a leg in the final).

The team

Roger Johansen, Rolf Einar Pedersen, Kjell Vidar Røyne, Eskil Hagen, Stig Tore Svee, Morten Værnes, Helge Bjørnstad, Tommy Rovelstad, Knut Andre Nordstoga, Loyd Remi Johansen, Kissinger Deng, Ole Bjarte Austevoll, Audun Bakke, Thomas Jacobsen
