= Ice sledge hockey at the 2006 Winter Paralympics =

2006 Winter Paralympics

Tournament details
- Host country: Italy
- Venue(s): Torino Esposizioni
- Dates: 11–18 March 2006
- Teams: 8

Final positions
- Champions: Canada (1st title)
- Runner-up: Norway
- Third place: United States
- Fourth place: Germany

Tournament statistics
- Games played: 20
- Goals scored: 111 (5.55 per game)
- Attendance: 59,896 (2,995 per game)
- Scoring leader(s): (Canada) Billy Bridges (18 points)

Awards
- MVP: (Norway) Rolf Einar Pedersen

At the 2006 Winter Paralympics, the ice sledge hockey events were contested at the Torino Esposizioni.

== Medalists ==
Event	Gold	Silver	Bronze
Men's	Canada (CAN)	Norway (NOR)	United States (USA)
Men's	Jeremy Booker; Brad Bowden; Billy Bridges; Marc Dorion; Raymond Grassi; Jean Labonté; Herve Lord; Shawn Matheson; Graeme Murray; Todd Nicholson; Mark Noot; Paul Rosen; Benoit St-Amand; Dany Verner; Greg Westlake	Helge Bjørnstad; Eskil Hagen; Atle Haglund; Loyd Remi Johansen; Roger Johansen; Kjetil Korbu Nilsen; Knut André Nordstoga; Rolf Einar Pedersen; Tommy Rovelstad; Kjell Vidar Røyne; Johan Siqveland; Stig Tore Svee; Morten Værnes; Arne Vik	Steve Cash; Taylor Chace; David Conklin; Jimmy Connelly; Brad Emmerson; Manuel Guerra Jr. Michael Hallman; Lonnie Hannah II; Joe Howard; Tim Jones; Taylor Lipsett; Christopher Manns; Alexi Salamone; Kip St. Germaine; Andrew Yohe

== Qualification ==
Qualifying event	Date	Venue	Vacancies	Qualified
Host			1	Italy
2004 World Championship	13–24 April 2004	(Sweden) Örnsköldsvik	3	Norway; United States; Sweden
Asian-Pacific quota			1	Japan
North American quota			1	Canada
2005 European Championships	10–16 April 2005	(Czech Republic) Zlín	1	Germany
Paralympic Last Chance Qualification Tournament	5–7 November 2005	(Italy) Turin	1	Great Britain

== Team rosters ==
Canada
Name
Jeremy Booker
Brad Bowden
Billy Bridges
Marc Dorion
Raymond Grassi
Jean Labonté
Herve Lord
Shawn Matheson
Graeme Murray
Todd Nicholson
Mark Noot
Paul Rosen
Benoit St-Amand
Dany Verner
Greg Westlake

Germany
Name
Gerd Bleidorn
Sebstiaan Disveld
Marius Hattendorf
Sebastian Kessler
Alexander Klein
Matthias Koch
Marco Lahrs
Robert Lionel Pabst
Raimund Patzelt
Rolf Rabe
Frank Rennhack
Udo Segreff
Sven Stumpe
Jorg Wedde

Great Britain
Name
Simon Berry
Mark Briggs
Gary Farmer
David French
Matt Lloyd
Karl Nicholson
Philip Saunders
Nathan Stephens
Stephen Thomas
Ian Warner
Richard Whitehead
Russell Willey

Italy
Name
Bruno Balossetti
Danilo Bosio
Gianluca Cavaliere
Andrea Chiarotti
Giovanni Colaone
Fabrizio Cozzi
Orazio Fagone
Ivan Ghironzi
Luigi Grill
Grégory Leperdi
Ambrogio Magistrelli
Francesco Mancuso
Hermann Oberparleiter
Adriano Rossetti
Werner Winkler

Japan
Name
Mikio Annaka
Takayuki Endo
Shinobu Fukushima
Naohiko Ishida
Tadashi Kato
Makoto Majima
Junichi Matsui
Eiji Misawa
Mitsuru Nagase
Taimei Shiba
Satoru Sudo
Kazuhiro Takahashi
Toshifumi Takeuchi
Daisuke Uehara
Mamoru Yoshikawa

Norway
Name
Helge Bjørnstad
Eskil Hagen
Atle Haglund
Loyd Remi Johansen
Roger Johansen
Kjetil Korbu Nilsen
Knut André Nordstoga
Rolf Einar Pedersen
Tommy Rovelstad
Kjell Vidar Royne
Johan Siqveland
Stig Tore Svee
Morten Værnes
Arne Vik

Sweden
Name
Aron Anderson
Jan Edbom
Marcus Holm
Niklas Ingvarsson
Kenth Jonsson
Goran Karlsson
Magnus Carlsson
Jens Kask
Rasmus Lundgren
Peter Melander
Leif Norgren
Frank Pedersen

United States
Name
Steve Cash
Taylor Chace
David Conklin
Jimmy Connelly
Brad Emmerson
Manuel Guerra
Michael Hallman
Lonnie Hannah
Joe Howard
Tim Jones
Taylor Lipsett
Christopher Manns
Alexi Salamone
Kip St. Germaine
Andrew Yohe

== Preliminary round ==
All times are local (UTC+1).

=== Group A ===
Pos	Team	Pld	W	D	L	GF	GA	GD	Pts	Qualification
1	Norway	3	3	0	0	22	1	+21	6	Semifinals
2	Canada	3	2	0	1	22	4	+18	4	Semifinals
3	Great Britain	3	1	0	2	2	16	−14	2	5–8th place semifinals
4	Italy (H)	3	0	0	3	1	26	−25	0	5–8th place semifinals

Source: Torino 2006
(H) Hosts

11 March 2006; 09:30	Canada	9–0 (3–0, 4–0, 2–0)	Great Britain	Torino Esposizioni

11 March 2006; 17:00	Norway	12–0 (7–0, 3–0, 2–0)	Italy	Torino Esposizioni; Attendance: 4,000

Game reference

Roger Johansen
Arne Vik
Goalies
Danilo Bosio
Referee:
(Japan) Yoshifumi Kasahara
Linesmen:
(Canada) Scott MacDonald
(Japan) Toshiki Takenaka

Pedersen (Svee, Bjørnstad) – 00:39	1–0
Hagen (Bjørnstad, Pedersen) – 04:43	2–0
Hagen (Pedersen, Nordstoga) – 04:57	3–0
Rovelstad (Nordstoga) – 09:21	4–0
Pedersen – 10:40	5–0
Værnes (Svee) – 11:43	6–0
Bjørnstad (Siqveland, Rovelstad) – 14:46	7–0
Haglund (Siqveland) – 19:24	8–0
Hagen (Nordstoga) (PP) – 21:49	9–0
Svee (Nilsen, Haglund) – 22:08	10–0
Rovelstad (SH) – 34:21	11–0
Rovelstad (Pedersen, Hagen) (PP) – 44:05	12–0

6 min
Penalties
10 min
25
Shots
5

12 March 2006; 09:30	Norway	6–0 (2–0, 2–0, 2–0)	Great Britain	Torino Esposizioni; Attendance: 385

Game reference

Roger Johansen
Goalies
Philip Saunders

Rovelstad (Hagen, Svee) – 01:04	1–0
Hagen (Rovelstad) (PP) – 05:11	2–0
Pedersen – 20:14	3–0
Rovelstad (Nordstoga, Pedersen) (PP) – 22:28	4–0
Rovelstad (Bjørnstad) (PP) – 35:28	5–0
L. Johansen (Bjørnstad) – 44:03	6–0

20 min
Penalties
14 min
20
Shots
5

12 March 2006; 17:00	Italy	0–12 (0–3, 0–4, 0–5)	Canada	Torino Esposizioni

14 March 2006; 13:00	Great Britain	2–1 (0–0, 2–1, 0–0)	Italy	Torino Esposizioni

14 March 2006; 20:30	Canada	1–4 (0–2, 1–2, 0–0)	Norway	Torino Esposizioni; Attendance: 4,040

Game reference

Paul Rosen
Goalies
Roger Johansen
Referee:
(Japan) Yoshifumi Kasahara
Linesmen:
(United States) Scott Bokal
(Sweden) Robin Pettersson

	0–1	05:40 – Hagen (Bjørnstad)
	0–2	07:37 – Pedersen (Rovelstad, Svee) (PP2)
	0–3	17:59 – Rovelstad (Bjørnstad, Svee) (PP)
Lord (Noot, Verner) – 23:25	1–3
	1–4	28:47 – Rovelstad (Bjørnstad, Pedersen) (PP)

16 min
Penalties
6 min
16
Shots
12

=== Group B ===
Pos	Team	Pld	W	D	L	GF	GA	GD	Pts	Qualification
1	Germany	3	2	1	0	6	1	+5	5	Semifinals
2	United States	3	2	0	1	10	3	+7	4	Semifinals
3	Japan	3	1	1	1	5	4	+1	3	5–8th place semifinals
4	Sweden	3	0	0	3	2	15	−13	0	5–8th place semifinals

Source: Torino 2006

11 March 2006; 13:00	United States	1–2 (1–2, 0–0, 0–0)	Germany	Torino Esposizioni

11 March 2006; 20:30	Sweden	1–5 (0–1, 1–3, 0–1)	Japan	Torino Esposizioni

12 March 2006; 13:00	Germany	4–0 (1–0, 1–0, 2–0)	Sweden	Torino Esposizioni

12 March 2006; 20:30	Japan	0–3 (0–0, 0–2, 0–1)	United States	Torino Esposizioni

14 March 2006; 09:30	Japan	0–0 (0–0, 0–0, 0–0)	Germany	Torino Esposizioni

14 March 2006; 17:00	Sweden	1–6 (0–3, 1–2, 0–1)	United States	Torino Esposizioni

== Classification round ==
=== Bracket ===
5–8th place semifinal
15 March
Japan	10
Italy	1
15 March
Great Britain	0
Sweden	3

Fifth place game
17 March
Japan (OT)	2
Sweden	1
Seventh place game
17 March
Italy	1
Great Britain (OT)	2

=== 5–8th place semifinals ===
15 March 2006; 11:00	Great Britain	0–3 (0–1, 0–1, 0–1)	Sweden	Torino Esposizioni

15 March 2006; 20:30	Japan	10–1 (2–1, 3–0, 5–0)	Italy	Torino Esposizioni

=== Seventh place game ===
17 March 2006; 11:00	Italy	1–2 OT (0–0, 1–0, 0–1) (OT: 0–1)	Great Britain	Torino Esposizioni

=== Fifth place game ===
17 March 2006; 20:30	Japan	2–1 OT (1–0, 0–1, 0–0) (OT: 1–0)	Sweden	Torino Esposizioni

== Medal round ==
=== Bracket ===
Semifinals
16 March
Norway	4
United States	2
16 March
Germany	0
Canada	5

Gold medal game
18 March
Norway	0
Canada	3
Bronze medal game
18 March
Germany	3
United States	4

=== Semifinals ===
16 March 2006; 11:00	Norway	4–2 (1–1, 1–1, 2–0)	United States	Torino Esposizioni; Attendance: 4,057

Game reference

Roger Johansen
Goalies
Manuel Guerra Jr.
Referee:
(Sweden) Mats Edenborg
Linesmen:
(Canada) Scot MacDonald
(Estonia) Maksim Toode

	0–1	05:59 – Hallman (Howard)
Pedersen – 06:50	1–1
Bjørnstad (Rovelstad, Svee) (PP) – 15:36	2–1
	2–2	26:03 – Howard (Hannah) (PP)
Rovelstad (PS) – 30:54	3–2
Bjørnstad (Hagen, Svee) (PP) – 43:51	4–2

6 min
Penalties
26 min
17
Shots
7

16 March 2006; 20:30	Germany	0–5 (0–0, 0–3, 0–2)	Canada	Torino Esposizioni

=== Bronze medal game ===
18 March 2006; 17:00	Germany	3–4 (1–1, 1–1, 1–2)	United States	Torino Esposizioni

=== Gold medal game ===
18 March 2006; 20:30	Norway	0–3 (0–1, 0–1, 0–1)	Canada	Torino Esposizioni; Attendance: 4,020

Game reference

Roger Johansen
Goalies
Paul Rosen
Referee:
(United States) Jonathan Morrison
Linesmen:
(United States) Scott Bokal
(Estonia) Maksim Toode

0–1	02:52 – Bowden (Bridges)
0–2	29:29 – Westlake (Bowden, Bridges) (PP)
0–3	44:56 – Bridges (ENG)

8 min
Penalties
4 min
18
Shots
9

== Statistics ==
=== Scoring leaders ===
List shows the top ten skaters sorted by points, then goals.

Player	GP	G	A	Pts	+/−	PIM	POS
(Canada) Billy Bridges	5	11	7	18	+16	6	F
(Norway) Tommy Rovelstad	5	9	4	13	+7	6	D
(Canada) Brad Bowden	5	6	7	13	+14	0	F
(Norway) Rolf Einar Pedersen	5	5	5	10	+6	8	D
(Norway) Helge Bjørnstad	5	3	7	10	+6	4	F
(Norway) Eskil Hagen	5	5	3	8	+4	4	F
(Japan) Daisuke Uehara	5	5	3	8	+6	0	F
(Canada) Greg Westlake	5	3	5	8	+15	4	F
(Norway) Stig Tore Svee	5	1	7	8	+2	16	F
(Japan) Takayuki Endo	5	4	3	7	+6	2	D

GP = Games played; G = Goals; A = Assists; Pts = Points; +/− = Plus/minus; PIM = Penalties in minutes; POS = Position
Source: Torino 2006

=== Leading goaltenders ===
Only the top five goaltenders, based on save percentage, who have played at least 40% of their team's minutes, are included in this list.

Player	TOI	GA	GAA	SA	Sv%	SO
(Canada) Paul Rosen	195:00	4	0.92	55	92.73	4
(Norway) Roger Johansen	191:54	5	1.17	38	86.84	2
(United States) Manuel Guerra Jr.	218:40	10	2.06	72	86.11	1
(Germany) Rolf Rabe	215:37	9	1.88	64	85.94	2
(Sweden) Kenth Jonsson	213:51	13	2.74	77	83.12	1

TOI = Time on ice (minutes:seconds); GA = Goals against; GAA = Goals against average; SA = Shots against; Sv% = Save percentage; SO = Shutouts

== Awards ==
- Most Valuable Player: (Norway) Rolf Einar Pedersen
- Best players selected by the directorate:
  - Best Goaltender: (Germany) Rolf Rabe
  - Best Defenceman: (Norway) Rolf Einar Pedersen
  - Best Forward: (Canada) Billy Bridges

Source: Torino 2006
