= Dan McCoy (sledge hockey) =

American ice sledge hockey player

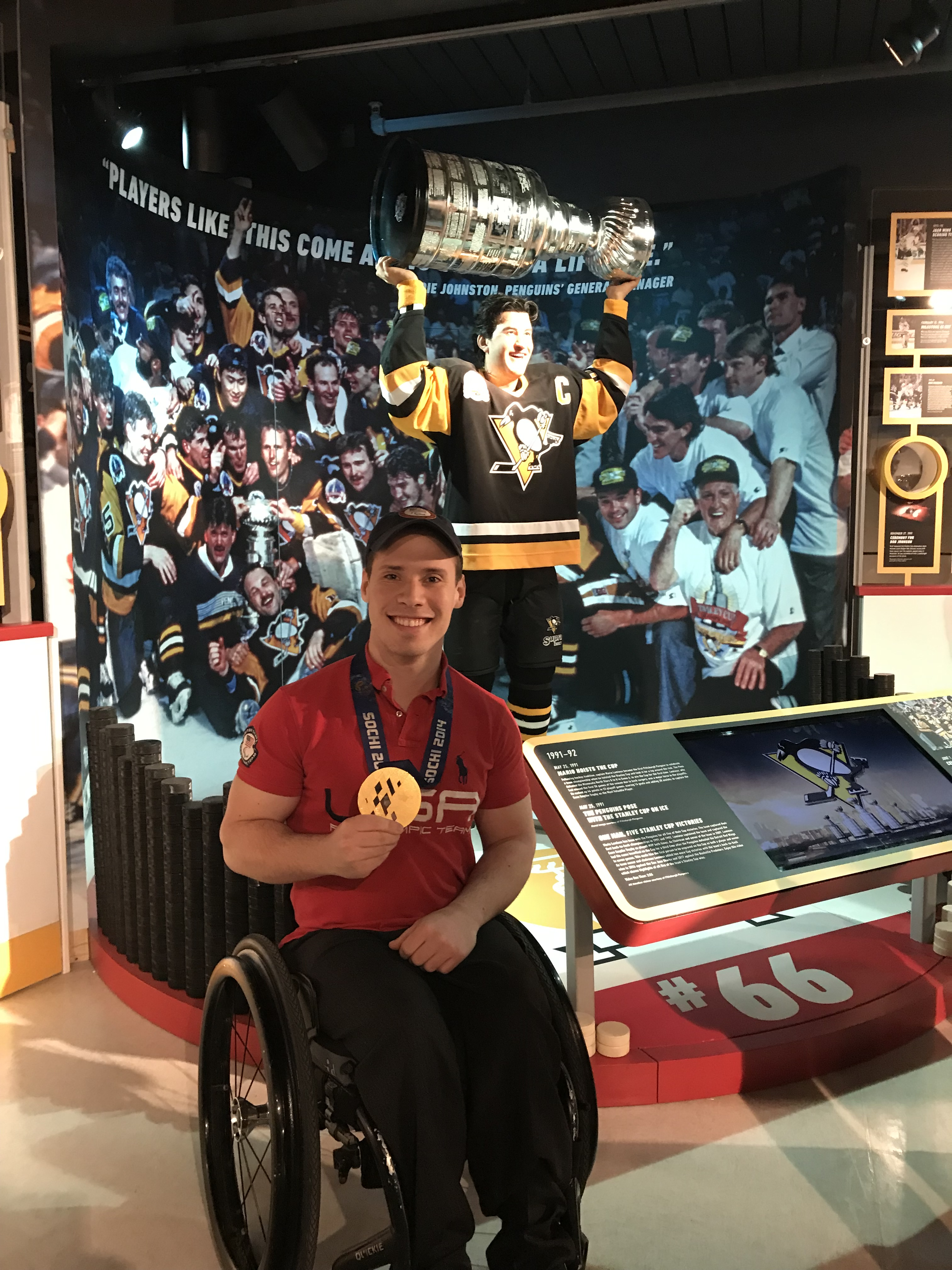
- McCoy in 2019

Personal information
- Full name: Daniel Frank McCoy
- Born: January 24, 1994 (age 32) Pittsburgh, Pennsylvania, U.S.
- Years active: 2003–present
- Height: 5 ft 4 in (163 cm)
- Weight: 155 lb (70 kg)

Sport
- Country: United States
- Sport: Ice sled hockey
- Position: Forward
- Disability: Spina Bifida
- Club: Pittsburgh Mighty Penguins Sled Hockey (2000-present)
- Team: U.S. National Sled Hockey
Medal record
Para ice hockey
Representing United States
Paralympic Games
Gold medal – first place	2014 Sochi	Team competition
World Championships
Gold medal – first place	2012 Hamar	Team competition
Gold medal – first place	2015 Buffalo	Team competition
Silver medal – second place	2013 Goyang	Team competition

Daniel Frank McCoy (born January 24, 1994) was born in Pittsburgh, Pennsylvania with spina bifida. He is an ice sled hockey player from the US and former member of the U.S. National Sled Hockey Team. Dan took part in the 2014 Winter Paralympics in Sochi, where USA won the gold medal. The US defeated Russia 1–0 in the final. McCoy retired from international competition in 2018 but continues his involvement with the Pittsburgh Mighty Penguins Sled Hockey Senior team where is a player (on the Senior Team), coach, board member, and the Director for Player Development.

== Biographical Information ==
Daniel Frank McCoy was born at Allegheny General Hospital in Pittsburgh to Mark and Angela (née Piluso) McCoy. McCoy was born with myelomeningocele (Spina Bifida) at lumbar area 3-4 which has resulted in partial paralysis. His older brother, Andrew, is a Fellow in Pediatrics Rehabilitation at the University of Colorado's Children's Hospital.

At the age of 5, McCoy was introduced to the sport of sled hockey by volunteers from Shriners Hospital in Erie, PA who traveled to Pittsburgh twice a month to provide sports therapy for individuals with physical disabilities in the area. At the time, McCoy's three-year-older brother Andrew was beginning to play stand-up hockey. McCoy knew that physically he could not play hockey like his brother but found that sled hockey, where players sit in sleds and propel themselves using two mini hockey sticks equipped with picks on one end, was as challenging. McCoy is one of the original players in the Mighty Penguins Sled Hockey organization and still competes with the senior team as captain.

At the age of 8, McCoy watched the 2002 Salt Lake City Paralympic Games in which a fellow Mighty Penguins player, Josh Wirt, was a member of the U.S. National Sled Hockey Team. Seeing Team U.S.A. win gold inspired a dream in McCoy to one day compete for the U.S. at the Paralympics.

At the age of 14, McCoy was selected for the U.S. Development Sled Hockey Team (Junior Sled Hockey team). At the age of 16, he was selected for the U.S. National Sled Hockey team. His dream of competing for his country came true when he traveled to Sochi in 2014 and competed in the Paralympic's sledge hockey games bringing home gold.

McCoy is an ACE certified personal trainer and is certified in CPR/AED.

In addition to playing sled hockey, McCoy enjoys handcycling and has competed in several Pittsburgh Marathons.

== Sled Hockey Career Highlights ==
Summary

- Gold medalist at the 2014 Paralympic Winter Games in Sochi, Russia.
- As a member of the U.S. National Sled Hockey Team, has played in three International Paralympic Committee Sled Hockey World Championships (gold – 2012, 2015; silver – 2013) and seven World Sled Hockey Challenge tournaments (first – 2012, 2015, 2016; second – 2011 (Nov.), 2013; third – 2011 (Apr.))
- Helped Team USA to a first-place finish at the January 2013 USA Hockey Sled Cup in Indian Trail, North Carolina. Scored twice in the championship game win vs. Korea
- Helped Team USA to a third-place finish at the March 2011 Japan Para Ice Sled Hockey Championship in Nagano, Japan. Tallied one assist in three games
- Two-time U.S. National Developmental Sled Hockey Team member (2009–10)

Paralympic Winter Games

- 2014: Tallied two assists over five games

IPC Sled Hockey World Championship

- 2015: Collected two points (1-1) in four games. Scored a goal in the gold-medal victory over Canada.
- 2013: Recorded one assist over four games
- 2012: Notched one goal in five games

World Sled Hockey Challenge

- 2016: Notched a goal and an assist in five games. Named U.S. Player of the Game in the 6–2 victory over Russia.
- 2015: Tallied six points (2-4) in five games
- 2013: Skated in all five games
- 2012: Scored twice in five games
- 2011 (Nov.): Scored twice in five games
- 2011 (Apr.): Posted four points (3-1) in five games
