= Kjetil Korbu Nilsen =

Norwegian ice sledge hockey player

- Born: 23 July 1971 (age 55) Kongsberg, Norway
Medal record
Para ice hockey
Representing Norway
Winter Paralympic Games
Silver medal – second place	1994 Lillehammer	Team competition
Gold medal – first place	1998 Nagano	Team competition
Silver medal – second place	2002 Salt Lake City	Team competition
Silver medal – second place	2006 Turin	Team competition

Kjetil Korbu Nilsen (born 23 July 1971) is a Norwegian ice sledge hockey player. He won medals for Norway at the 1994 Winter Paralympics, 1998 Winter Paralympics, 2002 Winter Paralympics, 2006 Winter Paralympics and 2010 Winter Paralympics.
