= Roger Johansen =

Roger Johansen may refer to:

- Roger Johansen (sledge hockey) (born 1973), Norwegian ice sledge hockey player
- Roger Johansen (musician) (born 1972), Norwegian jazz musician and composer
