= Johan Siqveland =

Norwegian Paralympic athlete

Personal information
- Nationality: Norway
- Born: 8 January 1974 (age 52) Stavanger, Norway
Medal record
Paralympic Games
Swimming
Gold medal – first place	1992 Barcelona	100m freestyle S8
Silver medal – second place	1992 Barcelona	400m freestyle S8
Men's Ice sledge hockey
Silver medal – second place	2002 Salt Lake City
Silver medal – second place	2006 Turin

Johan Siqveland (born 8 January 1974) is a Norwegian former Paralympic athlete. He won medals for Norway at the 1992 Summer Paralympics, 2002 Winter Paralympics and 2006 Winter Paralympics.
