= Kip St. Germaine =

American ice sledge hockey player

Personal information
- Full name: Francis X. St. Germaine III
- Nationality: United States
- Born: April 3, 1965 (age 61) Wareham, Massachusetts, U.S.
Medal record
Men's para ice hockey
Representing United States
Paralympic Games
Gold medal – first place	2002 Salt Lake City	Team competition
Bronze medal – third place	2006 Turin	Team competition
World Championships
Gold medal – first place	2009 Ostrava	Team competition

Francis X. "Kip" St. Germaine III (born April 3, 1965) is an American former ice sledge hockey player. He won medals with Team USA at the 2002 Winter Paralympics and 2006 Winter Paralympics. Germaine was inducted into the Massachusetts Hockey Hall of Fame in 2002.
