= Tommy Rovelstad =

Norwegian ice sledge hockey player

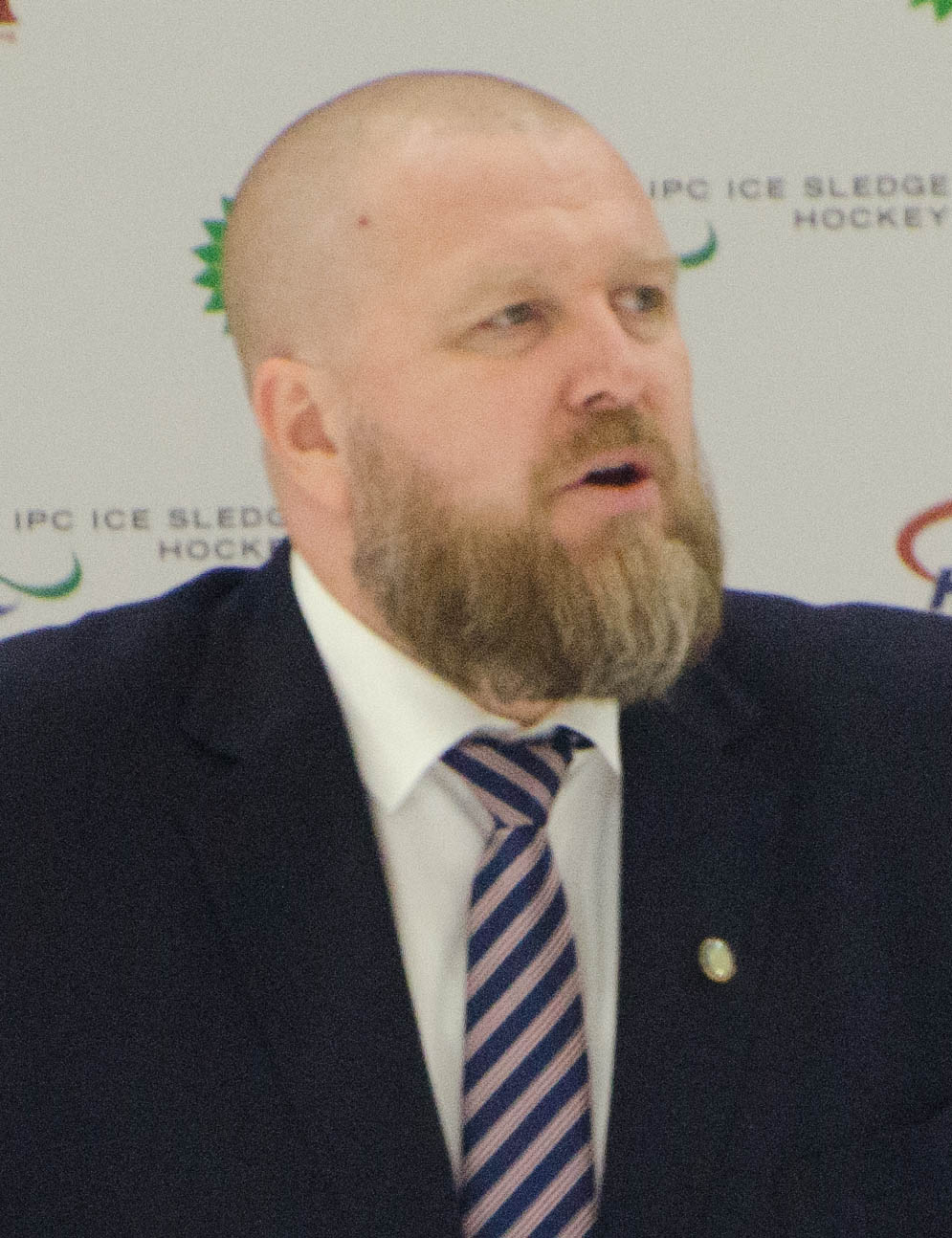
- Rovelstad in 2015

Personal information
- Nationality: Norway
- Born: 8 November 1972 (age 53) Oslo, Norway

Sport
- Sport: Ice sledge hockey
Medal record
Men's para ice hockey
Representing Norway
Paralympic Games
Gold medal – first place	1998 Nagano	Team competition
Silver medal – second place	2002 Salt Lake City	Team competition
Silver medal – second place	2006 Turin	Team competition
Bronze medal – third place	2010 Vancouver	Team competition
World Championships
Silver medal – second place	2009 Ostrava	Team competition

Tommy Rovelstad (born 8 November 1972) is a Norwegian sledge hockey player.

He began to play competitively in 1996. He has won a gold medal (1998), two silver medals (2002, 2006) and a bronze medal (2010) at the Winter Paralympics.

== Titles ==
- 2010 Winter Paralympics
  - Bronze
- 2008 World Championships
  - Silver
- 2006 Winter Paralympics
  - Silver
- 2004 World Championships
  - Gold
- 2002 Winter Paralympics
  - Silver
- 2000 World Championships
  - Silver
- 1998 Winter Paralympics
  - Gold
