= Lonnie Hannah =

American ice sledge hockey player

Personal information
- Nationality: United States
- Born: February 17, 1964 (age 62) Houston, Texas, U.S.
Medal record
Men's para ice hockey
Representing United States
Paralympic Games
Gold medal – first place	2002 Salt Lake City	Team competition
Bronze medal – third place	2006 Turin	Team competition
World Championships
Gold medal – first place	2009 Ostrava	Team competition

Lonnie Hannah II (born February 17, 1964) is an American former ice sledge hockey player. He won medals with Team USA at the 2002 Winter Paralympics and 2006 Winter Paralympics.

== Life and career ==
As a child, Hannah was a roller skating champion.

At 20 years old, he was injured at work by a falling shelving unit which broke three vertebrae and paralyzed him from the waist down. He was diagnosed with melanoma in 2005.

He won three national wheelchair tennis championships (two doubles and a single). In 1996, he was named Player of the Year by the National Foundation of Wheelchair Tennis.
