= Kempehallen =

Indoor ice rink in Örnsköldsvik, Sweden

Coordinates: 63°16′40″N 18°40′56″E

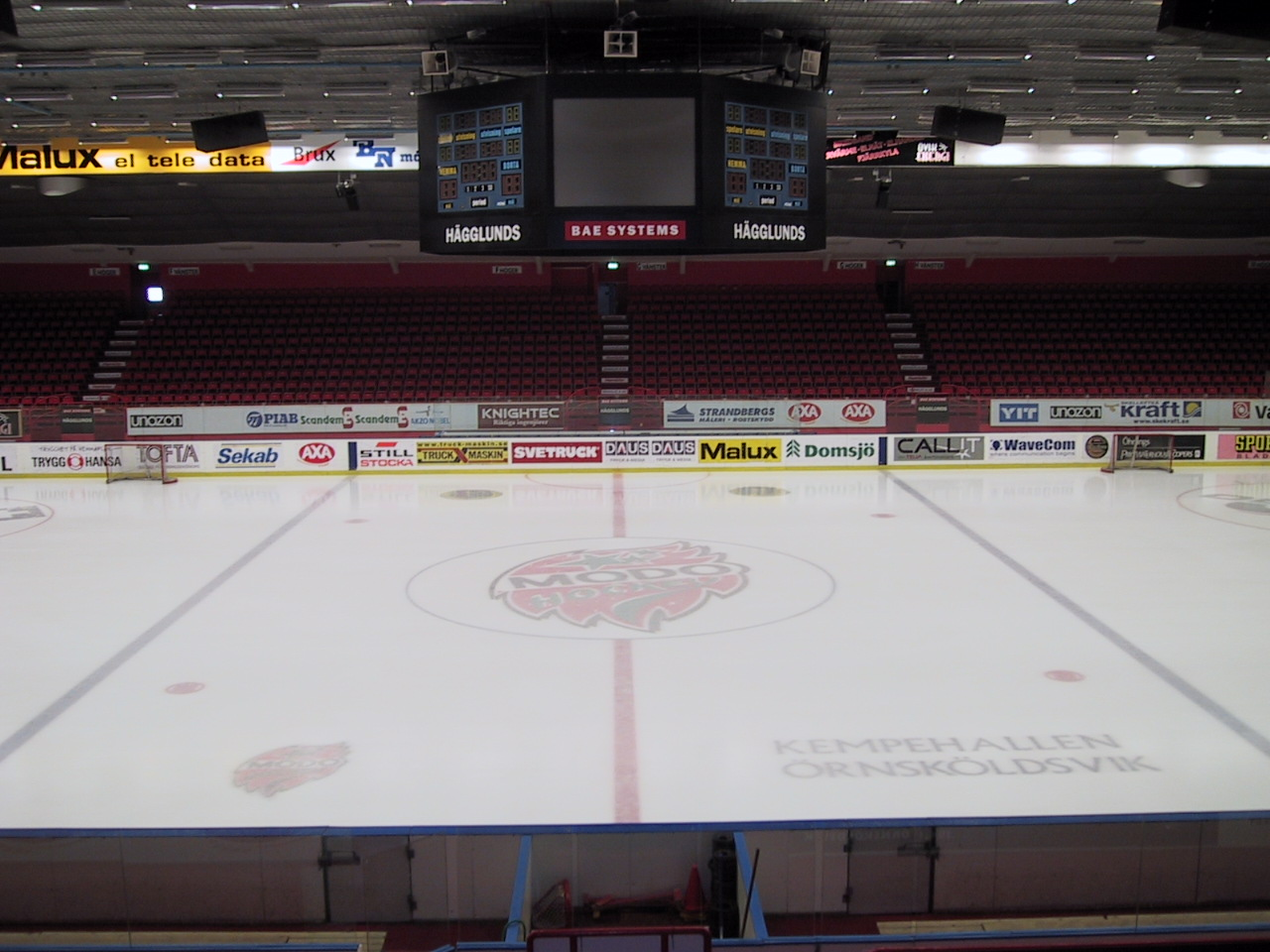
- Kempehallen in March 2006
- Interactive map of Kempehallen
- Location: Örnsköldsvik, Sweden
- Owner: Örnsköldsvik Municipality
- Capacity: Ice hockey: 5,114

Construction
- Opened: 4 October 1964
- Renovated: 1995
- Closed: June 2012
- Demolished: August 2012

Tenants
- Modo Hockey (SEL) (1964-2006), 1976 Winter Paralympics

Kempehallen was an indoor sporting arena located in Örnsköldsvik, Sweden, built in 1964. The capacity of the arena was 5,114 during the last years. It was however opened already in 1939 as an outdoor rink, and in 1958 artificial ice was installed. It was later rebuilt into an indoor arena, inaugurated on 4 October 1964 with the ice hockey game Modo AIK–Brynäs IF, 0–2. It originally had a capacity of 10,000 (standing only). About 2,000 seats were installed in 1969, and the capacity was lowered to 6,700. In 1995 the arena got an overhaul, with a few luxury boxes added among other improvements.

It was the home arena of the Modo Hockey ice hockey team, replaced in 2006 by the new downtown Swedbank Arena. Kempehallen then remained in use by the club's younger teams and other clubs in the area.

The all-time record attendance for Kempehallen was roughly 9,900 for a Sweden vs. Canada game in February 1965. Record attendances for Modo games stands at 9,153 for the outdoor rink (vs. AIK, 1964) and 8,778 for the indoor version of Kempehallen (vs. Brynäs IF, 1965).

Kempehallen hosted the 2004 Sledge Hockey World Championships, and some notable music acts include Motörhead and Europe.

On 15 June 2012, Örnsköldsvik Municipality condemned the arena due to dome structural failure. In August 2012, the arena was demolished.
