= Helge Bjørnstad =

Norwegian ice sledge hockey player and swimmer (born 1971)

- Born: 14 October 1971 (age 55) Østerås, Norway
- Position: ?
- National team: Norway
- Playing career: ?–present
Medal record
Representing Norway
Men's para ice hockey
Winter Paralympic Games
Gold medal – first place	1998 Nagano	Team competition
Silver medal – second place	1994 Lillehammer	Team competition
Silver medal – second place	2002 Salt Lake City	Team competition
Silver medal – second place	2006 Turin	Team competition
Bronze medal – third place	2010 Vancouver	Team competition
World Championships
Silver medal – second place	2009 Ostrava	Team competition
European Championships
Bronze medal – third place	2011 Sollefteå	Team competition
Men's para swimming
Summer Paralympic Games
Gold medal – first place	1992 Barcelona	100 m backstroke S9
Gold medal – first place	1992 Barcelona	200 m medley SM9
Gold medal – first place	1996 Atlanta	100 m backstroke S9
Gold medal – first place	1996 Atlanta	200 m medley SM9
Silver medal – second place	1992 Barcelona	400 m freestyle S9
Silver medal – second place	1996 Atlanta	100 m breaststroke SB8

Helge Bjørnstad (born 14 October 1971) is a Norwegian ice sledge hockey player and swimmer.

As a member of the Norwegian ice sledge hockey team he has three silver (1994, 2002, 2006) from the Paralympic Games. At the 1998 Paralympic Games the team took the gold medal. He took the bronze medal with the Norwegian team at the 2010 Winter Paralympics in Vancouver, Canada.

He has also won several Paralympic medals as a swimmer. He took two gold medals and one silver at the 1992 Summer Paralympics, and two gold and one silver at the 1996 Summer Paralympics.

He received the Egebergs Ærespris in 2009, a prize awarded to Norwegian athletes who excel in more than one sport.
