= David Conklin =

American ice sled hockey player

Personal information
- Nationality: United States
- Born: September 22, 1955 Edgerton, Wisconsin, U.S.
- Died: January 26, 2024 (aged 68)
Medal record
Paralympic Games
Gold medal – first place	2002 Salt Lake City	Men's sledge hockey
Bronze medal – third place	2006 Turin	Men's sledge hockey

David Conklin (September 22, 1955 – January 26, 2024) was an American ice sled hockey player. He won medals with Team USA at the 2002 Winter Paralympics and 2006 Winter Paralympics. He also competed in the 1998 Winter Paralympics.

Conklin died on January 26, 2024, at the age of 68.
