= Warren Martin (sledge hockey) =

Canadian ice sledge hockey player

Personal information
- Nationality: Canada
- Born: July 20, 1976 (age 49) Montreal, Quebec, Canada
Medal record
Paralympic Games
Silver medal – second place	1998 Nagano	Men's sledge hockey

Warren Martin (born July 20, 1976) is a Canadian former ice sledge hockey player. He won a silver medal with Team Canada at the 1998 Winter Paralympics. He also competed at the 2002 Winter Paralympics.
