= Atle Haglund =

Norwegian Paralympic athlete

Personal information
- Born: 10 April 1964 (age 62)

Sport
- Sport: Ice sledge hockey Ice sledge speed racing
Medal record
Representing Norway
Paralympic Games
Ice sledge speed racing
Gold medal – first place	1984 Innsbruck	1000m Gr II
Gold medal – first place	1994 Lillehammer	1500m LW10-11
Gold medal – first place	1994 Lillehammer	1000m LW10-11
Silver medal – second place	1984 Innsbruck	100m Gr II
Silver medal – second place	1994 Lillehammer	500m LW10-11
Bronze medal – third place	1988 Innsbruck	1500m Gr II
Ice sledge hockey
Gold medal – first place	1998 Nagano	Mixed tournament
Silver medal – second place	1994 Lillehammer	Mixed tournament
Silver medal – second place	2002 Salt Lake City	Mixed tournament
Silver medal – second place	2006 Torino	Mixed tournament

Atle Haglund (born 10 April 1964) is a Norwegian ice sledge hockey player and ice sledge speed racer. He lost both his legs in a traffic accident at the age of eight.

During the 1984 Winter Paralympics, Haglund participated in four disciplines of ice sledge speed racing. He won a gold in the 1,000 meter, and a silver in the 100 meter. During the 1988 Winter Paralympics, he again participated in four disciplines, and won a bronze in 1,500 meter. During the 1994 Winter Paralympics, he participated in both ice sledge speed racing and ice sledge hockey. He took a gold in 1,000 meter and 1,500, as well as a silver in 500 meter and the men's ice hockey tournament. He participated again in the ice sledge hockey at the following three Winter Paralympics, winning a gold in 1998, and a silver in 2002 and 2006.
