= Josh Wirt =

American ice sledge hockey player (born 1984)

Personal information
- Nationality: United States
- Born: October 9, 1984 (age 41) Johnstown, Pennsylvania, United States
Medal record
Paralympic Games
Gold medal – first place	2002 Salt Lake City	Men's sledge hockey

Josh Wirt (born October 9, 1984) is an American former ice sledge hockey player. He won a gold medal with Team USA at the 2002 Winter Paralympics.
