= Rasmus Isaksson =

Swedish ice sledge hockey player

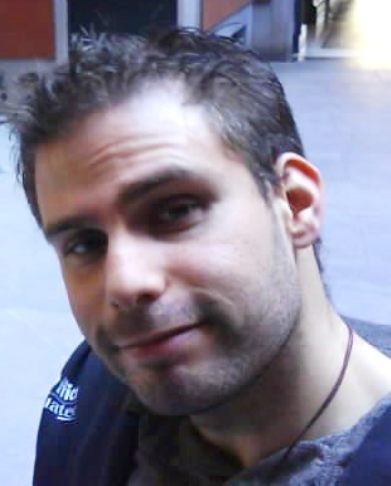
- Isaksson in 2008

Personal information
- Nationality: Sweden
- Born: 31 August 1980 (age 45) Lund, Sweden
Medal record
Paralympic Games
Bronze medal – third place	1998 Nagano	Men's sledge hockey
Bronze medal – third place	2002 Salt Lake City	Men's sledge hockey

Rasmus Isaksson (born 31 August 1980) is a Swedish former ice sledge hockey player. He won medals for Sweden at the 1998 Winter Paralympics and 2002 Winter Paralympics.
