= Robert Lagace =

Canadian ice sledge hockey player

Personal information
- Nationality: Canada
- Born: March 20, 1969 (age 57) Toronto, Ontario, Canada
Medal record
Paralympic Games
Bronze medal – third place	1994 Lillehammer	Men's sledge hockey
Silver medal – second place	1998 Nagano	Men's sledge hockey

Robert Lagace (born November 28, 1969) is a Canadian former ice sledge hockey player. He won medals with Team Canada at the 1994 Winter Paralympics and 1998 Winter Paralympics as well Gold at the 2000 World Championships held in Salt Lake City, Utah assisting on the Gold Medal-winning goal in overtime against Norway. He also played in the 2002 Winter Paralympics where the team finished in 4th place.
