= Manuel Guerra Jr. =

American ice sledge hockey player (born 1967)

Manuel "Manny" Guerra Jr.
Personal information
- Nickname: Jr.
- Nationality: United States
- Born: July 7, 1967 (age 58) Chicago, Illinois, United States
- Height: 5'10
- Weight: 230
Medal record
Paralympic Games
Gold medal – first place	2002 Salt Lake City	Men's sledge hockey
Bronze medal – third place	2006 Turin	Men's sledge hockey

Manuel Guerra Jr. (born July 7, 1967) is an American former ice sledge hockey player. He has won medals with Team USA at the 2002 Winter Paralympics and 2006 Winter Paralympics.

== Biography ==
His mother passed one week after he was born and contracted polio as an infant, leaving his left leg disabled. His father remarried and his step mother aided in his rehabilitation for his leg as a youth. As an adult he suffered from post polio syndrome from overuse of his healthy muscles and became depressed until at his wife’s urging tried disabled sports. Manny is divorced with four children and resides in Plymouth, Minnesota.

A love for the game of hockey since his childhood he would compete in his local area park hockey league and would wear a simple knee brace to counter the effects of instability along with a small 1” lift sole inside his left skate. He was introduced to the sport of sled hockey in 1991 by a local club in Minnesota and after playing for one season he received an invitation to attend the 1992 U.S. National Team Trials in which he was selected starting goaltender. As a member of the US Paralympic Team, which participated at the 2002 Winter Games in Salt Lake City, Utah ‐ Manny stopped Norway’s final three shots in a shootout preserving a 4‐3 victory and crowning Team USA champions of the 2002 Paralympic Winter Games and winning a Gold medal. Manny is a multi‐sport athlete and is regarded as one of the top athletes in wheelchair softball, basketball and Para Hockey (sled hockey) in the United States. He's won 5 World Series titles in wheelchair softball as a member of the St. Paul Saints 1991-2011 and Rolling Twins 2011-present.

== Accomplishments ==
- 2006 Paralympic Winter Games Bronze Medalist, Torino, Italy.
- 2004 IPC World Championships Silver medalist, Örnsköldsvik, Sweden.
- 2002 Paralympic Winter Games Gold Medalist, Salt Lake City, USA.
- 1995 IPC Swedish Winter Games Silver Medalist, Solleftea, Sweden.
- 1993 IPC World Championships Silver Medalist, Lillehammer, Norway.

== Awards ==
- 5 Time All-World Goaltender
- 2002 All World Goaltender (1st All Star). SVS%91.80, GAA 0.96
- 1997 World all-star Goalie, IPC Swedish Winter Games, Solleftea, Sweden.
- 1996 World all-star Goalie, IPC Sled Hockey World Championships, Nynashamn, Sweden.
- 1995 World all-star Goalie, IPC Swedish Winter Games, Solleftea, Sweden.
- 1993 MVP, US Friendship Cup Tournament, Bloomington, Minnesota.
- 1992 World all-star Goalie, Canadian Winter Games, Ottawa, Canada.

== Honors ==
- 2010 - White House Delegation to the Vancouver Olympic Winter Games.
- 2002 – U.S. Olympic Spirit Award by Nu Skin.
- 2002 – Bob Johnson Award - presented by Nike.
- 2002 - First Paralympian to present the President with Olympic Team Jacket.
- 2002 - First Mexican American to win Gold in the Paralympic Winter Games.
- 2002, 1998, 2006 – Presidential White House Visit.
