= Pierre Pichette =

Canadian ice sledge hockey player (1954–2022)

Personal information
- Born: January 27, 1954 Lachine, Quebec, Canada
- Died: March 16, 2022 (aged 68) Longueuil, Quebec, Canada
Medal record
Paralympic Games
Bronze medal – third place	1994 Lillehammer	Men's sledge hockey
Silver medal – second place	1998 Nagano	Men's sledge hockey

Pierre Pichette (January 27, 1954 – March 16, 2022) was a Canadian sledge hockey player. He won medals with Team Canada at the 1994 Winter Paralympics and 1998 Winter Paralympics. He also played in the 2002 Winter Paralympics.
