= Mark Noot =

Canadian ice sledge hockey player

Personal information
- Nationality: Canada
- Born: January 28, 1975 (age 51) Kitchener, Ontario, Canada
Medal record
Men's para ice hockey
Representing Canada
Paralympic Games
Gold medal – first place	2006 Torino	Team
World Championships
Bronze medal – third place	2009 Ostrava	Team

Mark Noot (born January 28, 1975) is a Canadian former ice sledge hockey player. He won a gold medal with Team Canada at the 2006 Winter Paralympics.
