= Kenth Jonsson =

Swedish ice sledge hockey player

Personal information
- Nationality: Sweden
- Born: 14 March 1964 (age 62) Sundsvall, Sweden
Medal record
Paralympic Games
Gold medal – first place	1994 Lillehammer	Men's sledge hockey
Bronze medal – third place	1998 Nagano	Men's sledge hockey
Bronze medal – third place	2002 Salt Lake City	Men's sledge hockey

Kenth Jonsson (born 14 March 1964) is a Swedish ice sledge hockey player. He won medals for Sweden at the 1994 Winter Paralympics, 1998 Winter Paralympics and 2002 Winter Paralympics. He also competed for Team Sweden at the 2006 Winter Paralympics, 2014 Winter Paralympics and the 2018 Winter Paralympics.
