= Hervé Lord =

Canadian ice sledge hockey player

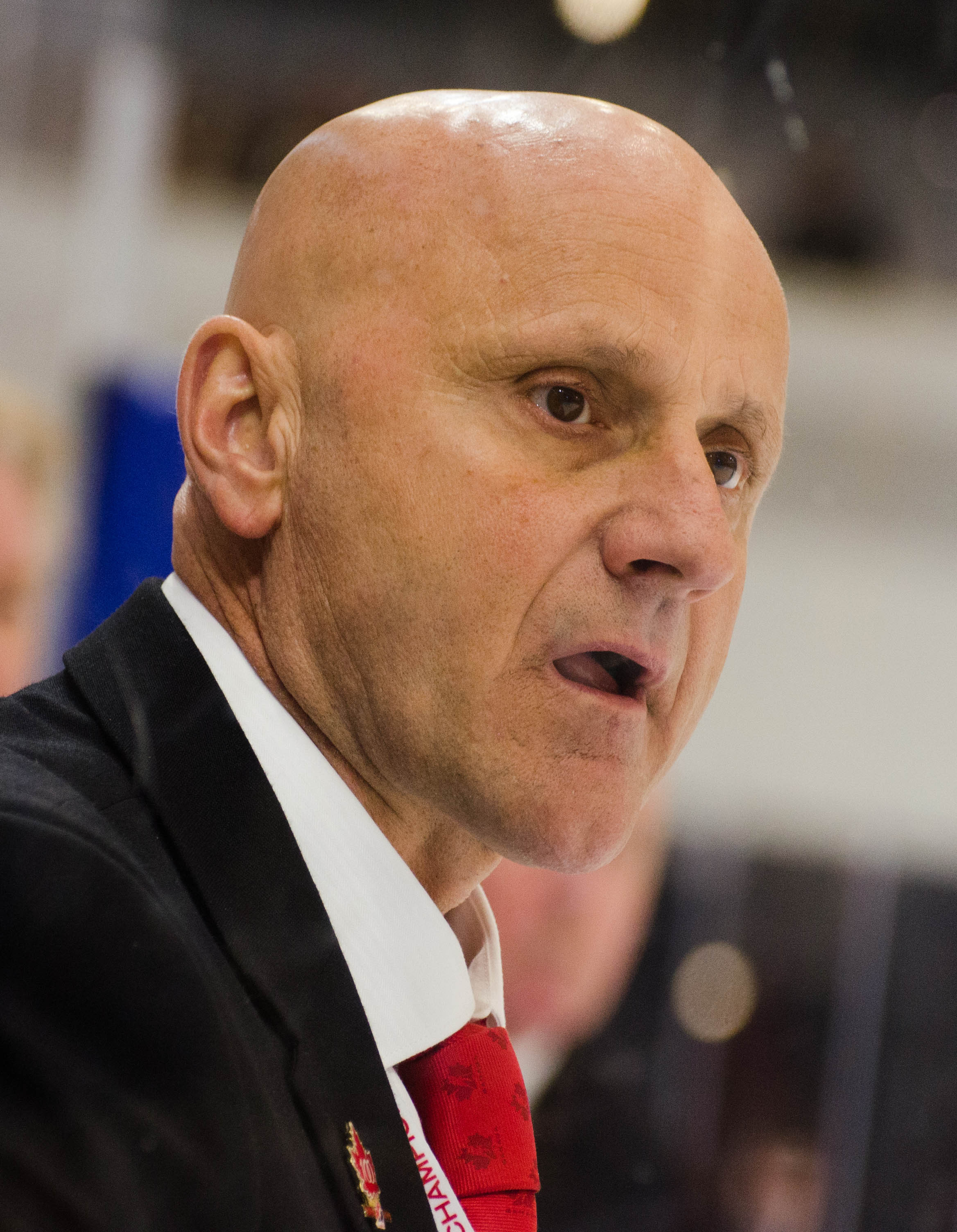
- Lord in 2015
- Born: March 3, 1958 (age 68) Saint-Pamphile, Quebec, Canada
- Height: 5 ft 5 in (165 cm)
- Weight: 135 lb (61 kg; 9 st 9 lb)
- Position: Forward
- Shot: Right
- National team: Canada
- Playing career: 1987–2010
Medal record
Representing Canada
Men's ice sledge hockey
Paralympic Games
Gold medal – first place	2006 Torino	Team
Silver medal – second place	1998 Nagano	Team
Bronze medal – third place	1994 Lillehammer	Team
World Championships
Gold medal – first place	2000 Salt Lake City	Team
Gold medal – first place	2008 Marlborough	Team
Bronze medal – third place	2009 Ostrava	Team
Men's ice sledge racing
Paralympic Games
Silver medal – second place	1998 Nagano	Team

Hervé Lord (born March 3, 1958) is a Canadian ice sledge hockey player. He was born in Saint-Pamphile, Quebec, Canada.

In the Paralympic Games, Lord has won numerous medals as a member of the Canadian team including bronze (1994), silver (1998) and gold (2006). He also competed with teams which finished in fourth place in 2002 and 2010.

Lord took the athletes' oath on behalf of all competitors at the 2010 Winter Paralympics in Vancouver. He announced his retirement from the Canadian ice sledge hockey team on September 7, 2010 (along with captain Jean Labonte, Todd Nicholson and goaltender Paul Rosen). Lord also participated at the Soldier On Paralympic Sport Summit at Carleton University in May 2008 in an effort to assist Canadian military members rebound from debilitating injuries resulting in permanent disability.

== Career stats ==
=== Hockey Canada ===
Year	Event	GP	G	A	PTS	PIM
2007	World sledge hockey championships	4	0	1	1	6
2008	World sledge hockey championships	4	1	1	2	8
2009	World sledge hockey championships	4	0	1	1	2

== Awards and honors ==
- King Clancy Outstanding Achievement Award, 2006 Paralympics
- Tournament All-Star team, 1992 World Cup
