= Todd Nicholson =

Canadian ice sledge hockey player

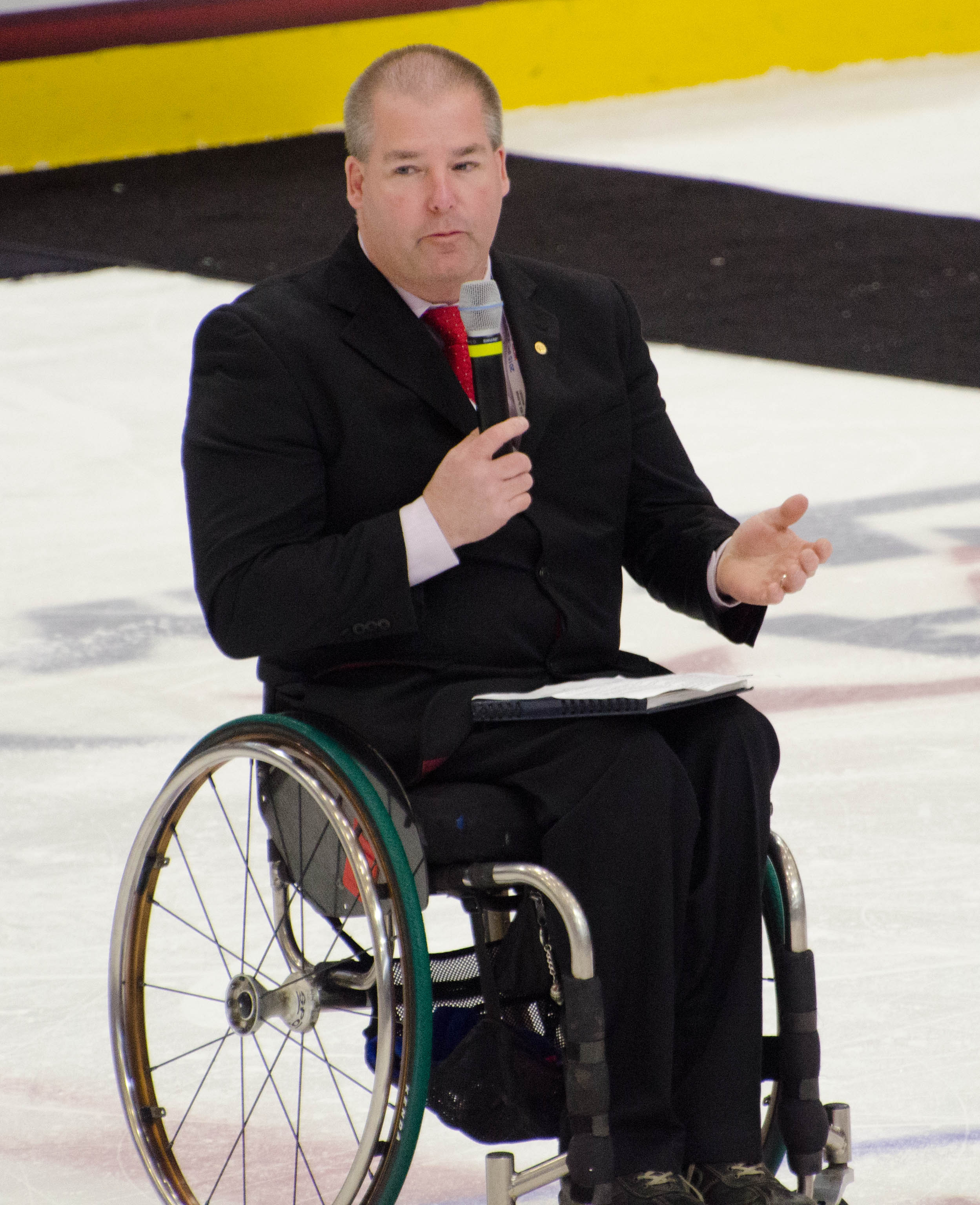
- Nicholson in 2015
- Born: January 28, 1969 (age 57) Ottawa, Ontario, Canada
- Height: 6 ft 0 in (183 cm)
- Weight: 170 lb (77 kg; 12 st 2 lb)
- Position: Forward
- Shot: Right
- National team: Canada
- Playing career: 1992–2010
Medal record
Men's para ice hockey
Representing Canada
Paralympic Games
Gold medal – first place	2006 Torino	Team
Silver medal – second place	1998 Nagano	Team
World Championships
Gold medal – first place	2000 Salt Lake City	Team
Gold medal – first place	2008 Marlborough	Team
Bronze medal – third place	2009 Ostrava	Team

Todd Nicholson, MSC (born January 28, 1969) is a Canadian former ice sledge hockey player. He was a member of the 2010 Paralympic Sledge Ice Hockey team, which were the fourth Paralympic games that Nicholson participated in. He announced his retirement from the Canadian ice sledge hockey team on September 7, 2010 (along with captain Jean Labonte, Paul Rosen, and Herve Lord). Nicholson now serves on the International Paralympic Committee Governing Board as the Athletes' Representative.

== Early life ==
On the way home from his high school prom, Nicholson was involved in a car accident that left him as a paraplegic.

== Hockey Canada ==
When not competing for Canada, Nicholson participates in the Ottawa Carleton Sledge Hockey Association.

== Personal ==
The township of West Carleton hosted Todd Nicholson Day on June 6, 2000, to honour his achievements in hockey. Nicholson volunteers with numerous charities including the Heart and Stroke Foundation, Kids Sports and the Canadian Paralympic Committee. When not playing hockey, Nicholson works as a Project Officer for the Canada Border Services Agency.

His Dunrobin, Ontario home was destroyed in the 2018 Ottawa–Gatineau tornadoes.

== Awards and honours ==
- Queen's Jubilee Award
- Tournament All-Star team, 1998 Paralympic Games
- Tournament All-Star team, 2002 Paralympic Games
- Canada's flag bearer at the 2006 Paralympic Games
- Inducted into the Ottawa Sports Hall of Fame / Athlete Category, May 2014
- Inducted into the Canadian Disability Hall of Fame, 2017.
- Awarded the Meritorious Service Cross in 2016.
