= Göran Karlsson =

Swedish sledge hockey player (born 1963)

Personal information
- Nationality: Sweden
- Born: 10 July 1963 (age 62) Västerås, Sweden
Medal record
Paralympic Games
Gold medal – first place	1994 Lillehammer	Men's sledge hockey
Bronze medal – third place	1998 Nagano	Men's sledge hockey
Bronze medal – third place	2002 Salt Lake City	Men's sledge hockey

Göran Karlsson (born 10 July 1963) is a Swedish former ice sledge hockey player. He won medals for Sweden at the 1994 Winter Paralympics, 1998 Winter Paralympics and 2002 Winter Paralympics. He also played in the 2006 Winter Paralympics and the 2018 Winter Paralympics.
