= Jeremy Booker =

Canadian ice sledge hockey player

Personal information
- Nationality: Canadian
- Born: November 8, 1986 (age 39) Ajax, Ontario, Canada
Medal record
Men's para ice hockey
Representing Canada
Paralympic Games
Gold medal – first place	2006 Turin	Team competition

Jeremy Booker (born November 8, 1986) is a Canadian former ice sledge hockey player. He won a gold medal with Team Canada at the 2006 Winter Paralympics. He also played in the 2010 Winter Paralympics.
