= Raymond Grassi =

Canadian sledge hockey player

Ray Grassi
Personal information
- Full name: Raymond Grassi
- Nationality: Canada
- Born: February 11, 1983 (age 43) Windsor, Ontario, Canada
Medal record
Men's para ice hockey
Representing Canada
Paralympic Games
Gold medal – first place	2006 Torino	Team
World Championships
Bronze medal – third place	2009 Ostrava	Team

Raymond Grassi (born February 11, 1983) is a Canadian former ice sledge hockey player. He won a gold medal with Team Canada at the 2006 Winter Paralympics. He also played in the 2010 Winter Paralympics. He is married with two children. After retiring, he has since become a teacher.
