= Roger Johansen (sledge hockey) =

Norwegian ice sledge hockey player

Personal information
- Born: 4 February 1973 (age 53)
Medal record
Men's para ice hockey
Representing Norway
Paralympic Games
Silver medal – second place	2002 Salt Lake City	Team competition
Silver medal – second place	2006 Turin	Team competition
Bronze medal – third place	2010 Vancouver	Team competition
World Championships
Silver medal – second place	2009 Ostrava	Team competition

Roger Johansen (born 4 February 1973) is a Norwegian ice sledge hockey player. He is a keeper, and plays for Oslo KHK.

He comes from Leirfjord Municipality, Nordland.

He took part in the 2010 Winter Paralympics in Vancouver.

== Honours ==
- 2010
  - Bronze at the Paralympics
- 2009
  - Silver at the 2009 World Championships
  - Gold at the Malmø Open
- 2007
  - Gold at the European Championships
- 2006
  - Silver at the Paralympics
- 2004
  - Gold at the World Championships
- 2002
  - Silver at the Paralympics
