= Leif Norgren =

Swedish ice sledge hockey player

Personal information
- Nationality: Sweden
- Born: 10 March 1964 (age 62) Köping, Sweden
Medal record
Paralympic Games
Bronze medal – third place	1998 Nagano	Men's sledge hockey
Bronze medal – third place	2002 Salt Lake City	Men's sledge hockey

Leif Norgren (born 10 March 1964) is a Swedish former ice sledge hockey player. He won medals for Sweden at the 1998 Winter Paralympics and 2002 Winter Paralympics.
