= Eskil Hagen =

Norwegian ice sledge hockey player

Personal information
- Nationality: Norway
- Born: 13 June 1970 (age 56) Lillehammer, Norway
Medal record
Men's para ice hockey
Representing Norway
Paralympic Games
| Gold medal – first place | 1998 Nagano | Team competition |
| Silver medal – second place | 1994 Lillehammer | Team competition |
| Silver medal – second place | 2002 Salt Lake City | Team competition |
| Silver medal – second place | 2006 Turin | Team competition |
| Bronze medal – third place | 2010 Vancouver | Team competition |
World Championships
| Silver medal – second place | 2009 Ostrava | Team competition |

Eskil Hagen (born 13 June 1970) is a Norwegian ice sledge hockey player. He won medals for Norway at the 1994 Winter Paralympics, 1998 Winter Paralympics, 2002 Winter Paralympics, 2006 Winter Paralympics and 2010 Winter Paralympics. He also played in the 2014 Winter Paralympics.
