= Dany Verner =

Canadian ice sledge hockey player

Personal information
- Nationality: Canada
- Born: April 28, 1977 (age 49) Saint-Eustache, Quebec, Canada
Medal record
Paralympic Games
Silver medal – second place	1998 Nagano	Men's sledge hockey
Gold medal – first place	2006 Turin	Men's sledge hockey

Dany Verner (born April 28, 1977) is a Canadian former ice sledge hockey player. He won medals with Team Canada at the 1998 Winter Paralympics and the 2006 Winter Paralympics. He also competed in the 2002 Winter Paralympics.
