= Jens Kask =

Swedish ice sledge hockey player (1966–2011)

Jens Kask (20 April 1966 – 15 January 2011) was a Swedish Paralympic ice sledge hockey player. He won one gold medal and two bronze medals for Sweden, and was captain of the Swedish team for many years. He served as his country's flag bearer at the 2010 Winter Paralympics opening ceremony.

When Kask was ten years old, he climbed up on the roof of a parked train, where he got an electric shock. As a result, he had to have both his legs amputated.

He died in his home outside of Stockholm in January 2011, at the age of 44.
