= Stig Tore Svee =

Norwegian ice sledge hockey player

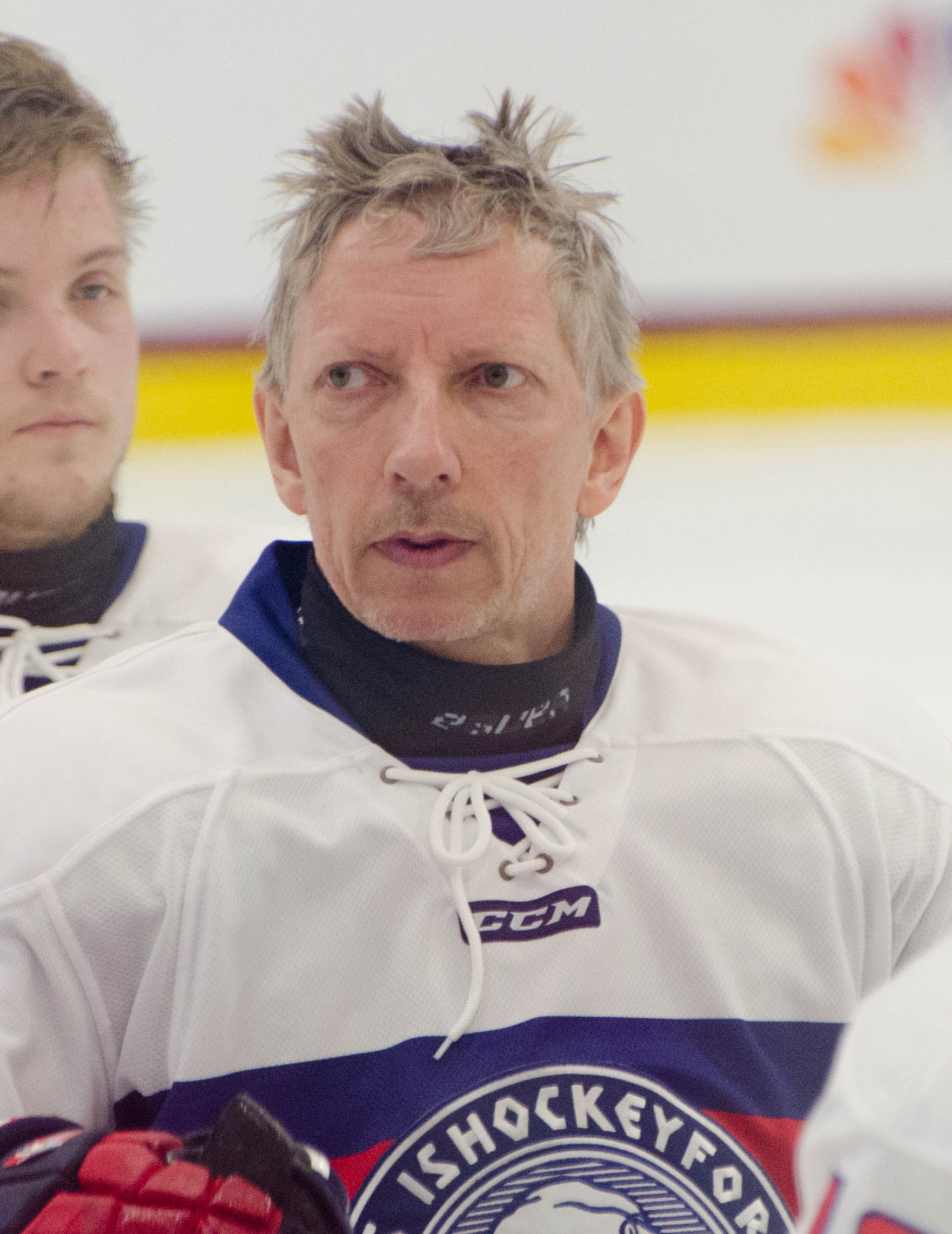
- Svee at the 2015 IPC Ice Sledge Hockey World Championships in Buffalo, New York
- Born: 16 December 1963 (age 62) Trondheim, Norway
- Position: Forward
- Played for: Rosenborg Sledge Hockey Club
- National team: Norway
- Playing career: ?–present
Medal record
Men's para ice hockey
Representing Norway
Paralympic Games
Bronze medal – third place	2010 Vancouver	Team competition
World Championships
Silver medal – second place	2009 Ostrava	Team competition
European Championships
Bronze medal – third place	2011 Sollefteå	Team competition

Stig Tore Svee (born 16 December 1963) is a Norwegian ice sledge hockey player.

He has earned two silver medals with his team at the 2002 Paralympic Games and 2006 Paralympic Games, and a gold medal at the 1998 Paralympic Games. He also took the bronze medal with the Norwegian team at the 2010 Winter Paralympics in Vancouver, British Columbia, Canada.
