= 2006 Winter Paralympics =

Multi-parasport event in Turin, Italy

IX Paralympic Winter Games
- Location: Turin, Italy
- Motto: Passion wins any challenge (Italian: La passione vince ogni sfida)
- Nations: 39
- Athletes: 486
- Events: 58 in 4 sports
- Opening: 10 March 2006
- Closing: 19 March 2006
- Opened by: President Carlo Azeglio Ciampi
- Closed by: IPC President Philip Craven
- Cauldron: Silvia Battaglio; Aroldo Ruschioni
- Stadium: Stadio Olimpico

The 2006 Winter Paralympic Games (Italian: Giochi paralimpici invernali del 2006), the ninth Paralympic Winter Games, took place in Turin, Italy, from 10 to 19 March 2006. These were the first Winter Paralympic Games to be held in Italy. They were also the first Paralympics to use the new Paralympics logo.

20 years later, Italy hosted the Winter Paralympics again in 2026, which were held in Milan and Cortina d'Ampezzo.

== Medal count ==
The top 10 NPCs by number of gold medals are listed below. The host nation (Italy) is highlighted.

Rank	Nation	Gold	Silver	Bronze	Total
1	Russia	13	13	7	33
2	Germany	8	5	5	18
3	Ukraine	7	9	9	25
4	France	7	2	6	15
5	United States	7	2	3	12
6	Canada	5	3	5	13
7	Austria	3	4	7	14
8	Japan	2	5	2	9
9	Italy*	2	2	4	8
10	Poland	2	0	0	2
Totals (10 entries)		56	45	48	149

== Sports ==
The Games featured 58 medal events in five disciplines of four sports. As with other Paralympic Games, medals are awarded for each classification within each event. The sport of wheelchair curling made its Paralympic debut at these games.

- Alpine skiing (24) ()
- Ice sledge hockey (1) ()
- Nordic skiing
  - Biathlon (12) ()
  - Cross-country skiing (20) ()
- Wheelchair curling (1) ()

== Venues ==
Five competition venues were used during the Winter Paralympics. They all hosted competitions during the 2006 Winter Olympics.

The Opening ceremonies were held at Stadio Olimpico Grande Torino and the closing and the awarding ceremonies for the snow events were also held in Turin were held at the Medals Plaza at Piazza Castello.

Alpine skiing events were held at Sestriere. Cross-country skiing and biathlon events were held shared by the Cesana San Sicario complex. All the skiing athletes were accommodated in the Mountain Paralympic Village in Sestriere.

Ice sledge hockey was held in Torino Esposizioni and wheelchair curling was held in Pinerolo Palaghiaccio. These athletes were accommodated in the Main Paralympic Village in Turin.

== Torch relay ==
The same torch design used for the Olympics was used for the Paralympic Games. On March 5, 2006, the torch began a 10-day journey between Rome, Torino and other cities and mountains. The Paralympic flame has been lit under the Arch of Constantine on the front of the Coliseum in Rome, Italy. The flame was ignited at the coming together of three symbolic figures: a winner at the Rome 1960 Summer Paralympic Games, a current athlete with a disability and a young person with a disability. From the lighting in Rome, the flame was transmitted by satellite to Turin, where the then Mayor of Turin, Sergio Chiamparino, received it at the Piazza della Repubblica. From there, the flame was carried along the Via Milano to the Town Hall by the first four torchbearers and the fire burned at the Town Hall - except for two days on Monte Rosa - until 8 March, when started its journey through the city.

Three days before the opening ceremonies, on 5 and 6 March, the Paralympic flame took a leg through the landscape of the Province of Vercelli and went up to the Margherita Hut at the peak of Monte Rosa, when started his way back to Turin. The route, organised together with local groups and authorities, included a parade through the streets of Alagna Valsesia by a group of athletes with a disability. Then a leg with another group of athletes carried the fire to the Alagna-Pianalunga gondola and the continued the way to towards Passo dei Salati. At the next day the torchbearers followed a trail for about an hour and was taken by helicopter to italian side of the Signalkuppe, reaching in a single group of athletes, the Margherita Hut. A special torch was used to burn the flame on the peak, and this group of athletes donate a symbolic book to the highest library in Europe, situated in the 4.554 meter refuge. At the end of the celebrations, the guides down the mountain with the flame. On March 8, the torch arrived again in the Torino City Hall and started their way before arriving in the Stadio Olimpico Grande Torino during the Opening Ceremonies.

== Calendar ==
●	Opening ceremony	●	Event competitions	●	Event finals	●	Closing ceremony

March	10th	11th	12th	13th	14th	15th	16th	17th	18th	19th
Ceremonies	●									●
Alpine Skiing		2	4	2	4		2	4	2	4
Biathlon		6			6					
Cross-country skiing			6			6		2	2	4
Ice sledge hockey		●	●		●	●	●	●	1	
Wheelchair curling			●	●	●	●	●	●	1	

== Participating National Paralympic Committees (NPC)s ==
Thirty-nine National Paralympic Committees (NPCs) classified athletes to compete at the 2006 Winter Paralympics. This was an increase of three from the 36 represented at the 2002 Winter Paralympics. The number in parentheses indicates the number of participants from each NPC.

Note that, although Greece was scheduled to compete and paraded during the Opening Ceremonies, no Greek athlete took part in any event; the International Paralympic Committee does not list Greece as having entered any athlete in the Games, and considers that there were thirty-eight NPCs at the Games, rather than thirty-nine.

- Andorra (2)
- Armenia (2)
- Australia (10)
- Austria (25)
- Belarus (6)
- Belgium (1)
- Bulgaria (3)
- Canada (35)
- Chile (2)
- China (8)
- Croatia (1)
- Czech Republic (5)
- Denmark (6)
- Finland (7)
- France (19)
- Germany (35)
- Great Britain (20)
- Hungary (2)
- Iran (1)
- Italy (39) (Host)
- Japan (40)
- Kazakhstan (2)
- South Korea (3)
- Latvia (1)
- Mexico (1)
- Mongolia (1)
- New Zealand (2)
- Norway (29)
- Poland (11)
- Russia (29)
- Slovakia (17)
- Slovenia (1)
- South Africa (1)
- Spain (9)
- Sweden (19)
- Switzerland (21)
- Ukraine (12)
- United States (56)

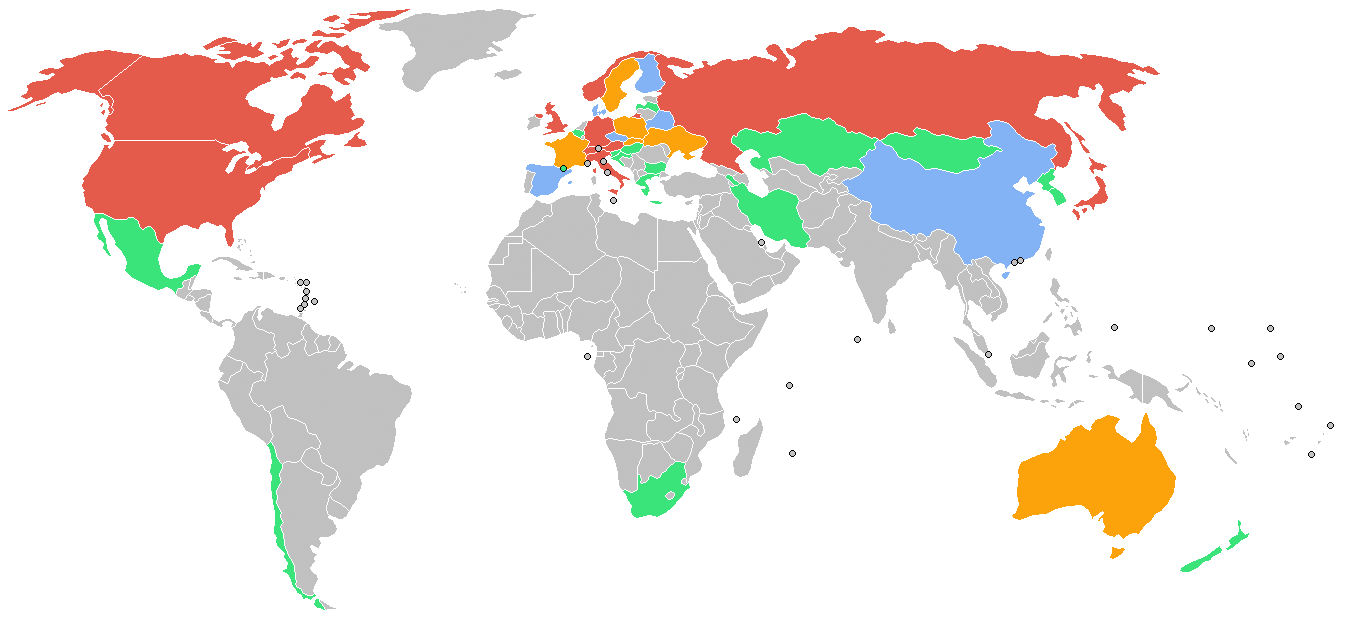
Participating nations. Green: fewer than 5 athletes; blue: 5–9; orange: 10–19; red: 20 or more.

A total of 486 athletes participated in the Games, 385 male and 101 female. This is an increase from the 430 athletes participated in 2002. Despite overall increase of delegates and athletes, the following nations who participated in the 2002 Winter Paralympics did not send athletes to Turin.

- Estonia
- Netherlands

Mexico was the only country who had sent an athlete to the Winter Paralympics but not the Olympics.

== Other information ==
These are the second Paralympic Games to be held in Italy, which hosted the first Summer Paralympics in Rome in 1960.

These are the first Paralympic Games to feature a live webcast of events, hosted by ParalympicSport.TV.

The Games mascot is Aster, a star-shaped snowflake similar in design and was the younger brother to the Olympic mascots Neve and Gliz.

Unable to fund the hosting themselves, the Olympic organizing committee TOROC decided to separate the organization of the two events, separating its Paralympic department into another Organizing Committee (ComParTo) to facilitate the management, organization and training of resources. In the end, ComParTo managed to raise an estimated amount of USD40 million. Despite this, the entire organization of both events was carried out in a unified manner.

== See also ==
- 2006 Winter Olympics

Preceded by Salt Lake City	Winter Paralympics; Turin; IX Paralympic Winter Games (2006)	Succeeded by Vancouver
