= 2002 Winter Paralympics =

Multi-parasport event in Salt Lake City, Utah, US

VIII Paralympic Winter Games
- Location: Salt Lake City, United States
- Motto: "Awaken the Mind – Free the Body – Inspire the Spirit”
- Nations: 36
- Athletes: 416
- Events: 92 in 4 sports
- Opening: 7 March 2002
- Closing: 16 March 2002
- Opened by: President George W. Bush
- Closed by: IPC President Philip Craven
- Cauldron: Muffy Davis; Chris Waddell
- Stadium: Rice-Eccles Stadium

The 2002 Winter Paralympics, the eighth Paralympic Winter Games, were held in Salt Lake City, Utah, United States, from 7 to 16 March 2002. A total of 416 athletes from 36 nations participated. They were the first Winter Paralympics in the American continent. These were the first Paralympic Winter Games for Andorra, Chile, China, Croatia, Greece, and Hungary. Ragnhild Myklebust of Norway won five gold medals in skiing and biathlon, becoming the most successful Winter Paralympic athlete of all time with 22 medals, 17 of them gold.

== Host city selection ==
Salt Lake City was chosen over Québec City, Canada; Sion, Switzerland; and Östersund, Sweden, on June 16, 1995, at the 104th IOC Session in Budapest, Hungary. Salt Lake City had previously come in second during the bids for the 1998 Winter Olympics, awarded to Nagano, Japan, and had offered to be the provisional host of the 1976 Winter Olympics when the original host, Denver, Colorado, withdrew. The 1976 Winter Olympics were ultimately awarded to Innsbruck, Austria.

There was a scandal involving allegations of bribery used to win the rights to the Games. Prior to its successful bid, Salt Lake City had attempted four times to secure the games, failing each time. In 1998, members of the International Olympic Committee (IOC) were accused of taking gifts from the Salt Lake Organizing Committee (SLOC) during the bidding process. The allegations resulted in the expulsion of several IOC members and the adoption of new IOC rules. Although nothing strictly illegal had been done, it was felt that the acceptance of the gifts was morally dubious. In addition, legal charges were brought against the leaders of Salt Lake's bid committee by the United States Department of Justice. Investigations were also launched into prior bidding process by other cities, finding that members of the IOC received bribes during the bidding process for both the 1998 Winter Olympics and 2000 Summer Olympics. In response to the scandal, Mitt Romney was hired as the new president and CEO of the Salt Lake Organizing Committee in February 1999.

== Paralympics ==
Motivated by the organizational problems faced during the 1996 Summer Paralympic Games, the Salt Lake City Bid Committee committed, from the beginning of the bidding process, to including the Paralympic Games in the overall planning for the 2002 Games.Since the 1994 Winter Paralympics this is first time that Olympics and Paralympics were thus organized by the same committee, sharing facilities, resources, and operational structures. At the time, this integration represented a significant innovation in the organization of two events and helped consolidate a more inclusive model for future editions of the Paralympic Games.

2002 Winter Olympics bidding result
| City | Country | Round 1 |
| Salt Lake City | United States | 54 |
| Östersund | Sweden | 14 |
| Sion | Switzerland | 14 |
| Quebec City | Canada | 7 |

== Opening ceremony ==
The opening ceremony was held on 7 March 2002 at Rice-Eccles Stadium, with more than 40,000 spectators. Muffy Davis and Chris Waddell jointly lit the Paralympic cauldron.

== Closing ceremony ==
The closing ceremony with more than 25.000 tickets sold was held on 16 March 2002 at the Olympic Medals Plaza in downtown Salt Lake City.

== Sports ==
The games consisted of four disciplines in three sports, with 92 medal events in total.

- Alpine skiing (53) ()
- Biathlon (6) ()
- Cross-country skiing (32) ()
- Ice sledge hockey (1) ()

== Venues ==
In total 5 venues were used at the 2002 Winter Olympics around 4 cities and towns.

=== Salt Lake City ===
- Rice-Eccles Olympic Stadium – opening ceremonies
- 2002 Olympic Medals Plaza – closing ceremonies

=== Weber County, Utah ===
- Snowbasin: Alpine skiing

=== Wasatch County, Utah ===
- Soldier Hollow: Biathlon and Cross-Country

=== West Valley City, Utah ===
- E Center: Ice sledge hockey

== Medal table ==
The top 10 NPCs by number of gold medals are listed below. The host nation (United States) is highlighted.

| Rank | Nation | Gold | Silver | Bronze | Total |
|---|---|---|---|---|---|
| 1 | Germany | 17 | 1 | 15 | 33 |
| 2 | United States* | 10 | 22 | 11 | 43 |
| 3 | Norway | 10 | 3 | 6 | 19 |
| 4 | Austria | 9 | 10 | 10 | 29 |
| 5 | Russia | 7 | 9 | 5 | 21 |
| 6 | Canada | 6 | 4 | 5 | 15 |
| 7 | Switzerland | 6 | 4 | 2 | 12 |
| 8 | Australia | 6 | 1 | 0 | 7 |
| 9 | Finland | 4 | 1 | 3 | 8 |
| 10 | New Zealand | 4 | 0 | 2 | 6 |
| Totals (10 entries) | | 79 | 55 | 59 | 193 |

== Participating National Paralympics Committees ==
36 nations qualified athletes for the games. Six countries:Andorra, Chile, China, Croatia, Greece and Hungary all made their debut appearances. Slovenia was the only nation who did not send a delegation after having participated in the previous games.

Participating National Paralympic Committees
- Andorra (2)
- Armenia (6)
- Australia (6)
- Austria (22)
- Belarus (4)
- Bulgaria (1)
- Canada (27)
- Chile (2)
- China (4)
- Croatia (2)
- Czech Republic (6)
- Denmark (1)
- Estonia (13)
- Finland (14)
- France (18)
- Germany (26)
- Great Britain (2)
- Greece (1)
- Hungary (1)
- Iran (1)
- Italy (13)
- Japan (36)
- Kazakhstan (1)
- Netherlands (4)
- New Zealand (2)
- Norway (27)
- Poland (14)
- Russia (26)
- Slovakia (14)
- South Africa (1)
- South Korea (6)
- Spain (8)
- Sweden (19)
- Switzerland (18)
- Ukraine (10)
- United States (57)

== Symbol and mascot of the games ==
=== Paralympic Emblem ===
The logo of the Salt Lake 2002 Paralympic Winter Games is made up of three distinct marks. The sphere on the top represents the head of the Paralympic athlete and also symbolizes the global unity of the Paralympic Movement. Two broad fluid lines represent the athlete in motion. The three taegeuks beneath the athlete reproduce the green, red and blue marks on the Paralympic Flag.

Otto 2002 Paralympic Mascot

=== Mascot ===
The mascot for the Paralympic Winter Games in Salt Lake City 2002 was Otto the otter. Indigenous peoples of the Americas consider otters to be fast swimmers, though in some stories a bit of a show-off. After being nearly wiped out by pollution and over-trapping the river otter has been reintroduced to Utah and can be seen along the banks of the Green River and near Flaming Gorge. The otter was chosen as the official mascot of the Salt Lake 2002 Paralympic Winter Games because he embodies vitality and agility, and represents the spirit of every Paralympian.

== See also ==
- 2002 Winter Olympics
- 2034 Winter Paralympics
- 2007 Winter Deaflympics

| Preceded by Nagano | Winter Paralympics; Salt Lake City; VIII Paralympic Winter Games (2002) | Succeeded by Turin |
