= Ice sledge hockey at the 2002 Winter Paralympics =

2002 Winter Paralympics
Tournament details
- Host country: United States
- Venue: E Center
- Dates: 8–15 March 2002
- Teams: 6

Final positions
- Champions: United States (1st title)
- Runners-up: Norway
- Third place: Sweden
- Fourth place: Canada

Tournament statistics
- Games played: 18
- Goals scored: 91 (5.06 per game)
- Scoring leader: (United States) Sylvester Flis (18 points)

Awards
- MVP: (United States) Sylvester Flis

The 2002 Winter Paralympics ice sledge hockey tournament was held from 8 March to 15 March 2002 at the E Center in West Valley City, Utah, United States.

== Final rankings ==
1st place, gold medalist(s)	2nd place, silver medalist(s)	3rd place, bronze medalist(s)	4th	5th	6th
United States Patrick Byrne; David Conklin; Matt Coppens; James Dunham; Sylvester Flis; Manuel Guerra Jr. Lonnie Hannah; Dan Henderson; Joe Howard; Christopher Manns; Brian Ruhe; Jack Sanders; Pat Sapp; Kip St.Germaine; Josh Wirt	Norway Helge Bjørnstad; Knut Erling Granaas; Eskil Hagen; Atle Haglund; Roger Hansen; Roger Johansen; Kjetil Korbu Nilsen; Rolf Einar Pedersen; Tommy Rovelstad; Erik Sandbraathen; Johan Siqveland; Geir Arne Skogstad; Stig Tore Svee; Morten Syversen; Arne Birger Vik	Sweden Mikael Axtelius; Daniel Cederstam; Dedjo Engmark; Marcus Holm; Niklas Ingvarsson; Rasmus Isaksson; Bengt-Gösta Johansson; Kenth Jonsson; Göran Karlsson; Jens Kask; Joakim Larsson; Leif Norgren; Mats Nyman; Frank Pedersen; Leif Wahlstedt	Canada Brad Bowden; Billy Bridges; Erik Desjardins; Jean Labonté; Robert Lagace; Serge Lamoureux; Hervé Lord; Warren Martin; Shawn Matheson; Lou Mulvihill; Graeme Murray; Todd Nicholson; Pierre Pichette; Paul Rosen; Dany Verner	Japan Takayuki Endo; Shinobu Fukushima; Tadanobu Go; Naohiko Ishida; Tadashi Kato; Tatsuya Kawamoto; Eiji Misawa; Mitsuru Nagase; Kanichi Naito; Taimei Shiba; Satoru Sudo; Kazuhiro Takahashi; Toshifumi Takeuchi; Atsuya Yaguchi; Mamoru Yoshikawa	Estonia Viktor Artemjev; Valeri Falkenberg; Aleksander Jarlõkov; Kaido Kalm; Vladimir Karandasev; Arvi Piirioja; Vladimir Savolainen; Andrei Sokolov; Jüri Tammleht; Imre Tiitsu; Maksim Vedernikov; Sergei Vesselov; Leonid Zubov

== Preliminary round ==
All times are local (UTC-7).

Pos	Team	Pld	W	D	L	GF	GA	GD	Pts	Qualification
1	United States (H)	5	5	0	0	22	3	+19	10	Gold medal game
2	Norway	5	3	0	2	18	8	+10	6	Gold medal game
3	Sweden	5	2	1	2	12	18	−6	5	Bronze medal game
4	Canada	5	1	2	2	8	12	−4	4	Bronze medal game
5	Estonia	5	1	1	3	8	20	−12	3	Fifth place game
6	Japan	5	1	0	4	5	12	−7	2	Fifth place game

Source: Salt Lake City 2002
(H) Hosts

8 March 2002; 09:00	Japan	0–3 (0–0, 0–0, 0–3)	United States	E Center, West Valley City; Attendance: 2,073

Game reference

Mitsuru Nagase
Goalies
Manuel Guerra Jr.
Referee:
Chris Kit
Linesmen:
Mats Edenborg
Bob McMann

0–1	34:09 – Manns (Coppens, Ruhe)
0–2	39:18 – Flis (Manns, Conklin)
0–3	44:38 – Sanders (Conklin, Manns) (PP)

6 min
Penalties
16 min
14
Shots
19

8 March 2002; 12:00	Sweden	4–1 (1–0, 2–0, 1–1)	Estonia	E Center, West Valley City

8 March 2002; 19:00	Canada	2–1 (1–0, 0–1, 1–0)	Norway	E Center, West Valley City

9 March 2002; 11:00	Estonia	2–1 (0–0, 0–1, 2–0)	Japan	E Center, West Valley City

9 March 2002; 15:00	Norway	8–3 (0–0, 4–2, 4–1)	Sweden	E Center, West Valley City

9 March 2002; 19:00	United States	5–1 (3–1, 0–0, 2–0)	Canada	E Center, West Valley City

11 March 2002; 09:00	Norway	1–2 (0–1, 0–0, 1–1)	United States	E Center, West Valley City

11 March 2002; 12:00	Estonia	3–3 (2–1, 1–1, 0–1)	Canada	E Center, West Valley City

11 March 2002; 19:00	Sweden	4–2 (3–1, 1–1, 0–0)	Japan	E Center, West Valley City

12 March 2002; 11:00	Norway	6–1 (2–0, 2–1, 2–0)	Estonia	E Center, West Valley City

12 March 2002; 15:00	Canada	1–2 (1–0, 0–1, 0–1)	Japan	E Center, West Valley City

12 March 2002; 19:00	Sweden	0–6 (0–2, 0–1, 0–3)	United States	E Center, West Valley City

14 March 2002; 09:00	Canada	1–1 (0–0, 1–0, 0–1)	Sweden	E Center, West Valley City

14 March 2002; 12:00	United States	6–1 (1–0, 1–1, 4–0)	Estonia	E Center, West Valley City

14 March 2002; 19:00	Japan	0–2 (0–0, 0–0, 0–2)	Norway	E Center, West Valley City

== Final round ==
=== Fifth place game ===
15 March 2002; 11:00	Estonia	2–6 (0–2, 0–2, 2–2)	Japan	E Center, West Valley City; Attendance: 5,400

Referee:
Mark Gallant

	0–1	04:20 – Yaguchi (PP)
	0–2	13:41 – Yoshikawa (PP)
	0–3	15:51 – Ishida
	0–4	23:27 – Yoshikawa (PP)
Kalm – 32:13	1–4
	1–5	35:09 – Endo
Tammleht (PP) – 38:26	2–5
	2–6	43:37 – Shiba

=== Bronze medal game ===
15 March 2002; 15:00	Sweden	2–1 GWS (0–1, 0–0, 1–1) (OT: 0–0) (SO: 1–0)	Canada	E Center, West Valley City; Attendance: 6,000

		Referee: Scott Brinkman
/ 0–1 / 12:38 – Bridges; Karlsson (PP) – 32:37 / 1–1		Referee: Scott Brinkman
Karlsson	Shootout	Referee: Scott Brinkman

=== Gold medal game ===
15 March 2002; 19:00	United States	4–3 GWS (2–1, 1–1, 0–1) (OT: 0–0) (SO: 1–0)	Norway	E Center, West Valley City; Attendance: 8,317

Game reference

Manuel Guerra Jr.
Goalies
Roger Johansen
Referee:
Chris Kit
Linesmen:
Mats Edenborg
Yoshifumi Kasahara

	0–1	02:49 – Pedersen
Howard (Flis, Hannah) – 13:06	1–1
Howard (Flis, Ruhe) (PP) –14:13	2–1
Coppens (Flis, Howard) – 15:12	3–1
	3–2	16:04 – Haglund (Bjørnstad)
	3–3	32:46 – Svee (Bjørnstad, Pedersen)

Flis (miss)
Howard
Manns
St. Germaine
Hannah (miss)
Shootout
Bjørnstad
Pedersen
(miss) Hansen
(miss) Svee
(miss) Haglund
10 min
Penalties
16 min
22
Shots
15

== Awards and statistics ==
- Scoring leader: (United States) Sylvester Flis 18 points (11 goals, 7 assists)
- Best scorer: (United States) Sylvester Flis (11 goals)
- MVP: (United States) Sylvester Flis
- All-Star Team

	All-Star Team A	All-Star Team B
Goaltender	(United States) Manuel Guerra Jr.	(Japan) Mitsuru Nagase
Defencemen	(United States) Sylvester Flis (Norway) Tommy Rovelstad	(United States) Brian Ruhe (Canada) Shawn Matheson
Forwards	(Norway) Helge Bjørnstad (United States) Joe Howard (Sweden) Marcus Holm	(Japan) Takayuki Endo (Estonia) Maksim Vedernikov (Canada) Billy Bridges

== See also ==
- 2000 IPC Ice Sledge Hockey World Championships in Salt Lake City
