= Canada at the 1998 Winter Paralympics =

- Flag of Canada
- IPC code: CAN
- NPC: Canadian Paralympic Committee
- Website: www.paralympic.ca

in Nagano
- Competitors: 32 in 3 sports
- Flag bearers: Bill Harriott (opening); Colette Bourgonje (closing)
- Medals Ranked 15th: Gold 1 Silver 9 Bronze 5 Total 15

Winter Paralympics appearances (overview)
- 1976; 1980; 1984; 1988; 1992; 1994; 1998; 2002; 2006; 2010; 2014; 2018; 2022; 2026

Canada competed in the 1998 Winter Paralympics in Nagano, Japan from March 5 to 14, 1998. 32 athletes were sent by the Canadian Paralympic Committee to compete in three sports. Canada won a record of 15 medals at that time and finished fifteenth on the medal table.

== Medallists ==
Medal	Name	Sport	Event
Gold	Daniel Wesley	Alpine skiing	Men's Super-G LW11
Silver	Stacy William Kohut	Alpine skiing	Men's giant slalom LW11
Silver	Stacy William Kohut	Alpine skiing	Men's slalom LW11
Silver	Stacy William Kohut	Alpine skiing	Men's Super-G LW11
Silver	Marilyn Winder; Guide: Dale Winder	Alpine skiing	Women's Super-G B1,3
Silver	Karolina Wisniewska	Alpine skiing	Women's Super-G LW3,4,5/7,6/8
Silver	Karolina Wisniewska	Alpine skiing	Women's giant slalom LW3,4,5/7,6/8
Silver	Colette Bourgonje	Cross-country skiing	Women's 2.5 km sitski
Silver	Colette Bourgonje	Cross-country skiing	Women's 5 km sitski
Silver	Canada national ice sledge hockey team: Yves Joseph Carrier; Dean Emmett Delaurier; Hugh David Eamer; Jamie Eddy; Angelo Gavillucci; Jean Labonte; Daniel Labrie; Robert Lionel Lagace; Herve Lord; Warren Martin; Shawn Matheson; Dean Mellway; Todd Nicholson; Pierre Pichette; Dany Verner	Ice sledge hockey	Ice sledge hockey
Bronze	Ramona Hoh	Alpine skiing	Women's giant slalom LW3,4,5/7,6/8
Bronze	Daniel Wesley	Alpine skiing	Men's downhill LW11
Bronze	Mark Ludbrook	Alpine skiing	Men's Super-G LW4
Bronze	Marilyn Winder; Guide: Dale Winder	Alpine skiing	Women's giant slalom B1,3
Bronze	Marilyn Winder; Guide: Dale Winder	Alpine skiing	Women's slalom B1,3

== See also ==
- Canada at the 1998 Winter Olympics
- Canada at the Paralympics
