= 1996 IPC Ice Sledge Hockey World Championships =

Tournament details
- Host country: Sweden
- Venue: 1 (in 1 host city)
- Dates: March – March, 1996
- Teams: 6

Final positions
- Champions: Sweden

Tournament statistics
- Scoring leader(s): (Sweden) Jan Edbom (18 goals) (Sweden) Göran Karlsson (9 goals) (Sweden) Jens Kask (7 goals)

Awards
- MVP: (Sweden) Jan Edbom (27 points)

The 1996 IPC Ice Sledge Hockey World Championships was the first IPC Ice Sledge Hockey World Championships held in March, 1996 Nynäshamn, Sweden. Participating countries: Canada, Estonia, Japan, Norway, Sweden and United States. Japan made its debut at the World Championship.

== Final rankings ==
( Rosters are not yet complete )

Gold:	Silver:	Bronze:	4th:	5th	6th
Sweden Jan Edbom; Bengt-Gösta Johansson; Kenth Jonsson; Marcus Nordstrom; Göran Karlsson; Jens Kask; Leif Norgren; Mats Nyman; Leif Wahlstedt	Norway Helge Bjørnstad; Knut Erling Granaas; Eskil Hagen; Atle Haglund; Kjetil Korbu Nilsen; Rolf Öjen; Rolf Einar Pedersen; Erik Sandbraaten; Morten Syversen	Canada Yves Carrier; Dean Delaurier; Dave Eamer; Angelo Gavillucci; Pat Griffin; Jean Labonté; John May; Dean Mellway; Lou Mulvihill Lealand Nickerson; Ken Schneider; Brian Swan; Dany Verner	Estonia Viktor Artemjev; Aleksander Jarlõkov; Kaido Kalm; Viktor Karlenko; Jüri Tammleht; Maksim Vedernikov; Leonid Zubov	United States Dave Conklin; Manuel Guerra Jr. Dan Henderson; William Michael Kult; Wayne Chuck Lindsey; Kip St.Germaine; Thomas F McNally; Joseph M Wilson	Japan Tadanobu Go; Naohiko Ishida; Kanichi Naito; Toshifumi Takeuchi; Atsuya Yaguchi; Mamoru Yoshikawa

== Tournament ==
=== Tournament summary ===
Rank	Team	SWE	CAN	NOR	EST	USA	JPN	Played	Wins	Ties	Losses	GF	GA	Points
1	SWE		1-1	4-1	4-1	11-0	21-0	5	4	1	0	41	3	9
2	CAN	1-1		1-1	3-0	5-0	10-0	5	3	2	0	20	2	8
3	NOR	1-4	1-1		4-1	2-0	15-0	5	3	1	1	23	6	7
4	EST	1-4	0-3	1-4		5-1	8-1	5	2	0	3	15	13	4
5	USA	0-11	0-5	0-2	1-5		3-0	5	1	0	4	4	23	2
6	JPN	0-21	0-10	0-15	1-8	0-3		5	0	0	5	1	57	0

Sweden 11 - 1 United States

- ( SWE: Jan Edbom 5, Göran Karlsson 2, Leif Wahlstedt 2, Mats Nyman 1, Jens Kask 1 USA: Wayne C Lindsey 1 )

Norway 15 - 0 Japan

- ( NOR: Atle Haglund 5, Rolf Einar Pedersen 3, Eskil Hagen 1, Kjetl Korbu Nielsen 1, Helge Björnstad 1, Rolf Öjen 1, Morten Syversen 1 )

Sweden 21 - 0 Japan

- ( SWE: Jan Edbom 8, Mats Nyman 4, Göran Karlsson 4, Jens Kask 3, Bengt-Gösta Johansson 2 )

United States 0 - 5 Canada

- ( CAN: John May 2, Dean Mellway 2, Lou Mulvihill 1 )

Norway 11 - 0 United States

- ( NOR: Helge Björnstad 4, Eskil Hagen 2, Rolf Einar Pedersen 2, Atle Haglund 1, Erik Sandbraaten 1, Morten Syversen 1 )

Sweden 4 - 1 Estonia

- ( SWE: Mats Nyman 3, Jan Edbom 1 EST: Viktor Karlenko 1 )

Norway 4 - 1 Estonia

- ( NOR: Helge Björnstad 3, Eskil Hagen 1 EST: Viktor Artemjev 1 )

Canada 10 - 0 Japan

- ( CAN: Dean Mellway 3, Dave Earner 2, Pat Griffin 1, Jean Labonté 1, Angelo Gavilluci 1, John May 1 )

Canada 1 - 1 Norway

- ( CAN: Lou Mulvihill 1 NOR: Helge Björnstad 1 )

Estonia 8 - 1 Japan

- ( EST: Jün Tammleht 3, Kaido Kalm 2, Viktor Karlenko 2, Viktor Artemjev 1 JPN: Mamoru Yoshikawa 1 )

Japan 0 - 3 United States

- ( USA: Wayne Chuck Lindsey 1, Thomas F Mc Nally 1, Joseph M Wilson 1 )

Canada 3 - 0 Estonia

- ( CAN: Dean Mellway 2, Jean Labonté 1 )

Sweden 4 - 1 Norway

- ( SWE: Jan Edbom 2, Mats Nyman 1, Jens Kask 1 NOR: Kjetil Korbu Nielsen 1 )

Estonia 5 - 1 United States

- ( EST: Jüri Tammeleht 2, Kaido Kalm 1, Leonid Zubov 1, Viktor Karlenko 1 USA: William Michael Kult 1 )

Sweden 1 - 1 Canada

- ( SWE: Jocke Larsson 1 CAN: Dean Mellway 1 )

== Semifinals ==
Sweden 7 - 1 Estonia

- ( SWE: Jens Kask 3, Jan Edbom 2, Bengt-Gösta Johansson 1, Jock Larsson 1 EST: Viktor Karlenko 1 )

Norway 2 - 1 Canada

- ( NOR: Eskil Hagen 2 CAN: Dean Mellway 1 )

== 3rd-place match ==
Canada 3 - 1 Estonia

- (CAN: Lou Mulvihill 1, Dean Mellway 1, Pat Griffin 1 EST: Jüri Tammleht 1 )

== Final ==
Sweden 3 - 2 Norway

- (SWE: Jan Edbom 2, Göran Karlsson 1 NOR: Atle Haglund 1, Eskil Hagen 1 )

== 1996 World All Star Team ==
- United States Manuel Guerra Jr. (mv)- all-star goaltender
- Norway Eskil Hagen
- Norway Helge Björnstad
- Sweden Jan Edbom
- Canada Pat Griffin
- Estonia Jüri Tammleht

== See also ==
- Ice sledge hockey
- Ice hockey#Sledge hockey
- Ice sledge hockey at the 2006 Winter Paralympics
- 2000 IPC Ice Sledge Hockey World Championships
- 2004 IPC Ice Sledge Hockey World Championships
- 2008 IPC Ice Sledge Hockey World Championships
