= Canada at the 1994 Winter Paralympics =

- Flag of Canada
- IPC code: CAN
- NPC: Canadian Paralympic Committee
- Website: www.paralympic.ca

in Lillehammer
- Competitors: 34 in 4 sports
- Flag bearers: Lou Mulvihill (opening); Lana Spreeman (closing)
- Medals Ranked 14th: Gold 1 Silver 2 Bronze 5 Total 8

Winter Paralympics appearances (overview)
- 1976; 1980; 1984; 1988; 1992; 1994; 1998; 2002; 2006; 2010; 2014; 2018; 2022; 2026

Canada competed at the 1994 Winter Paralympics in Lillehammer, Norway from March 10 to 19, 1994. 34 athletes competed in all four sports: alpine skiing, ice sledge hockey, ice sledge speed racing, and Nordic skiing (biathlon and cross-country skiing).

== Medallists ==
Medal	Name	Sport	Event
Gold	Stacy William Kohut	Alpine skiing	Men's Super-G LW12
Silver	Ramona Hoh	Alpine skiing	Women's slalom LW6/8
Silver	Lana Spreeman	Alpine skiing	Women's slalom LW3/4
Bronze	Ramona Hoh	Alpine skiing	Women's downhill LW6/8
Bronze	Lana Spreeman	Alpine skiing	Women's downhill LW3/4
Bronze	Lana Spreeman	Alpine skiing	Women's Super-G LW3/4
Bronze	Lana Spreeman	Alpine skiing	Women's giant slalom LW3/4
Bronze	Canada national ice sledge hockey team: John Belanger; Yves Joseph Carrier; J. C. Chan; Jamie Eddy; Angelo Gavillucci; Pat Griffin; Dan Jansen; Robert Lionel Lagace; Herve Lord; Shawn Matheson; Dean Mellway; Lou Mulvihill; Todd Nicholson; Pierre Pichette; Ken Schneider	Ice sledge hockey	Ice sledge hockey

== See also ==
- Canada at the 1994 Winter Olympics
- Canada at the Paralympics
