= Ice sledge hockey at the 1994 Winter Paralympics =

1994 Winter Paralympics
Tournament details
- Host country: Norway
- Venue: 1 (in 1 host city)
- Dates: 10–19 March 1994
- Teams: 5

Final positions
- Champions: Sweden (SWE) (1st title)
- Runners-up: Norway (NOR)
- Third place: Canada (CAN)
- Fourth place: Great Britain (GBR)

Ice sledge hockey at the 1994 Winter Paralympics consisted of a mixed event.

Although it was a mixed event, the only female athlete was the Norwegian Britt Mjaasund Øyen.

== Medal summary ==
Event	Gold	Silver	Bronze
Mixed	Sweden (SWE) Sven Carlsson; Jan Edbom; Bengt-Arne Johansson; Bengt-Gösta Johansson; Rolf Johansson; Kenth Jonsson; Goran Karlsson; Jens Kask; Mats Nyman; Leif Wahlstedt	Norway (NOR) Helge Bjørnstad; Alf Engeseth; Knut Erling Granaas; Eskil Hagen; Atle Haglund; Britt Mjaasund Øyen; Kjetil Korbu Nilsen; Hans Christian Norseth; Rolf Einar Øyen; Kjell Vidar Røyne; Erik Sandbråten	Canada (CAN) John Belanger; Yves Joseph Carrier; J. C. Chan; Jamie Eddy; Angelo Gavillucci; Pat Griffin; Dan Jansen; Robert Lionel Lagace; Herve Lord; Shawn Matheson; Dean Mellway; Lou Mulvihill; Todd Nicholson; Pierre Pichette; Ken Schneider

== Preliminary round ==
Pos	Team	Pld	W	D	L	GF	GA	GD	Pts	Qualification	Norway	Sweden	Canada	United Kingdom	Estonia
1	Norway (H)	4	2	2	0	8	2	+6	6	Gold medal game	—	2–1	0–0	0–0	6–1
2	Sweden	4	3	0	1	14	4	+10	6	Gold medal game	1–2	—	2–1	7–0	4–1
3	Canada	4	2	1	1	6	2	+4	5	Bronze medal game	0–0	1–2	—	0–0	5–0
4	Great Britain	4	1	1	2	2	7	−5	3	Bronze medal game	0–0	0–7	0–0	—	2–0
5	Estonia	4	0	0	4	2	17	−15	0		1–6	1–4	0–5	0–2	—

Source: https://www.paralympic.org/lillehammer-1994/results/para-ice-hockey/mixed-tournament
(H) Hosts

== Bronze medal game ==
March 1994	Canada	2–0	Great Britain

== Gold medal game ==
March 1994	Norway	0–1 OT (0–0, 0–0, 0–0) (OT: 0–1)	Sweden
