= Kieran Block =

Canadian sledge hockey player

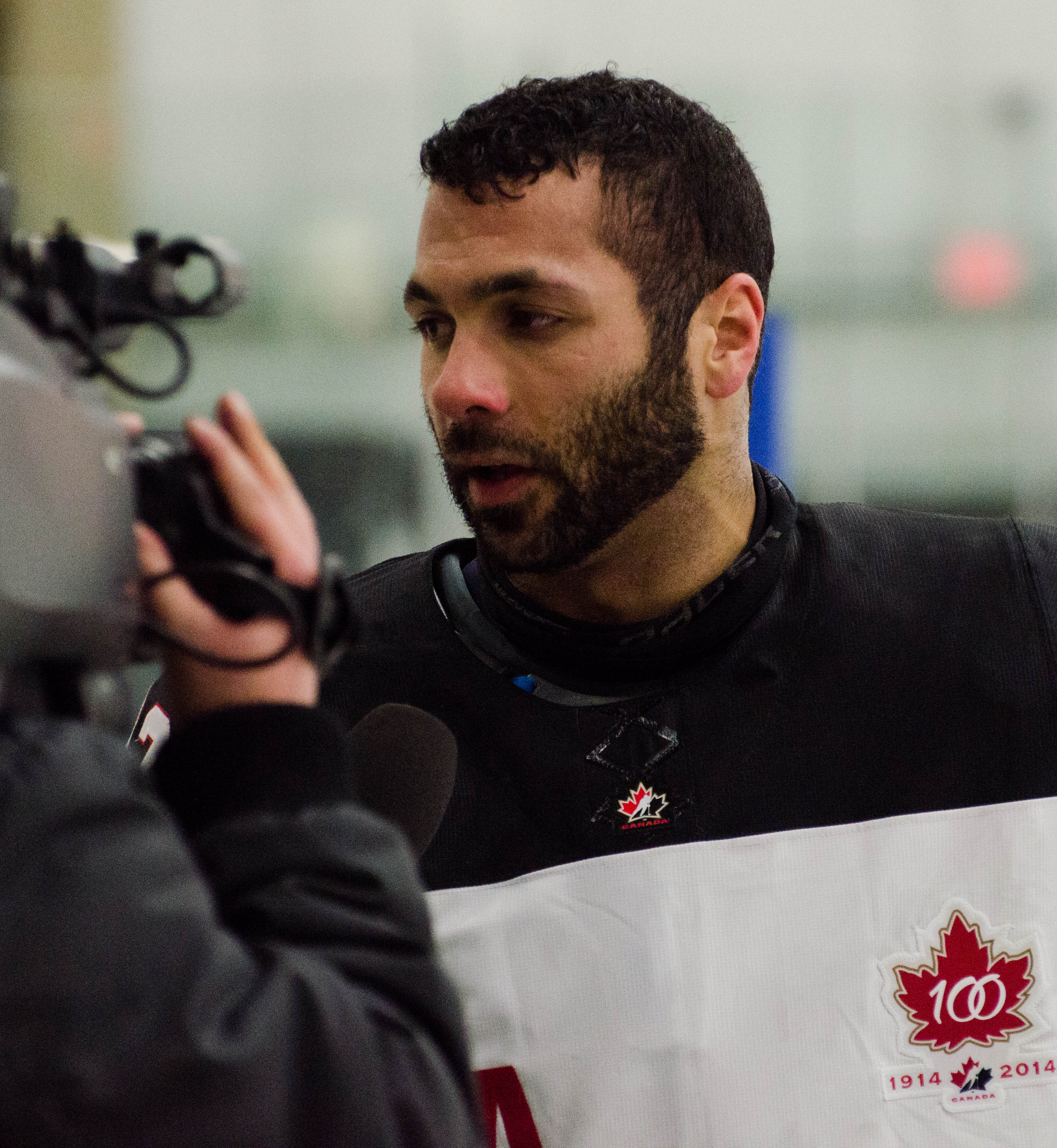
- Block in 2015

Personal information
- Nationality: Canada
- Born: June 14, 1985 (age 41) Edmonton, Alberta, Canada
Medal record
Men's para ice hockey
Representing Canada
World Championships
Gold medal – first place	2013 Goyang	Team
Silver medal – second place	2015 Buffalo	Team
Bronze medal – third place	2012 Hamar	Team
World Sledge Hockey Challenge
Gold medal – first place	2011 Calgary	Team
Gold medal – first place	2013 Toronto	Team
Silver medal – second place	2012 Calgary	Team
Bronze medal – third place	2015 Leduc	Team

Kieran T. Block (born June 14, 1985) is a Canadian ice hockey and ice sledge hockey player. Most notably, he has won championships with the Medicine Hat Tigers (2004) and Canada men's national ice sledge hockey team (2013). As of 2019, Block coaches the EASA Storm. A graduate of the University of Alberta, Block now works as a teacher and motivational speaker. His autobiography, The Ups and Downs of Almost Dying, was released in August 2017 on the 10th anniversary of the cliff-jumping accident that nearly killed him.

== Hockey career ==
Block played in the Western Hockey League from 2001 to 2006. Following a single season with the Vancouver Giants, Block was traded to the Medicine Hat Tigers where he remained for four seasons, winning the league championship in 2004. Block then played a season with the Alberta Golden Bears (2007). In the summer before his second season, he was severely injured in an accident that left him unable to compete. In the summer of 2009, Block was introduced to sledge hockey by his friend Matt Cook and went on to join the national team in 2011, where he competed for two seasons. Block left the team at the beginning of his third season, shortly after winning gold at the 2013 IPC Ice Sledge Hockey World Championships. He rejoined the team for one more season the following year, winning silver at the 2015 IPC Ice Sledge Hockey World Championships. Block returned to competitive stand-up shortly thereafter, and now plays for the Stony Plain Eagles.

== Accident and recovery ==
On August 6, 2007, Block was injured in a cliff-jumping accident in Jasper National Park. He broke bones in both legs, an ankle, and a heel, and since then has only been able to walk unassisted with limited mobility.
