= Bengt Johansson =

Bengt Johansson may refer to:

- Bengt Johansson (handball) (1942–2022), Swedish handball player and coach
- Bengt Johansson (wrestler) (1926–2008), Swedish wrestler
- Bengt Johansson (hammer thrower) (born 1973), Swedish hammer thrower, 1997 NCAA champion for the USC Trojans track and field team
- Bengt-Anders Johansson (born 1951), Swedish politician
- Bengt-Arne Johansson (disambiguation)
  - Bengt-Arne Johansson (officer) (born 1943), Swedish lieutenant-general
  - Bengt-Arne Johansson (sledge hockey), Swedish sledge hockey player
- Bengt-Gösta Johansson (born 1944), Swedish ice sledge hockey player
