= Ruhe =

Ruhe is a German surname. It may refer to:

== People ==
- Ruhe (Māori chief) (? - 1865) Ngāpuhi iwi (tribe) in northern New Zealand
- Johann Friedrich Ruhe (1699–1776) German composer
- Volker Rühe (1942) German politician affiliated to the CDU. German Defence minister from April 1, 1992
- Michael Ruhe (1980) German rower at the 2004 Summer Olympics
- Barnaby Ruhe American artist
- Martin Ruhe (born 1970) German cinematographer known for his work on the film Harry Brown
- Brian Ruhe (1974) American former ice sledge hockey player

== Other ==
- Firma Ruhe, an animal trading company
- Ruhe, meine Seele!, Op. 27, No. 1, composed by Richard Strauss in 1894.
- Kluge-Ruhe Aboriginal Art Collection of the University of Virginia
- Ruhe (song), Schiller
