= Cecilia Paulson =

Swedish Paralympic alpine skier

Personal information
- Born: Västerås, Sweden

Sport
- Country: Sweden
- Sport: Alpine skiing
Medal record
Alpine skiing
Representing Sweden
Paralympic Games
Silver medal – second place	2002 Salt Lake City	Giant slalom LW12
Silver medal – second place	2002 Salt Lake City	Slalom LW10-12
Bronze medal – third place	1998 Nagano	Downhill LW10-11
Bronze medal – third place	1998 Nagano	Super-G LW10-11

Cecilia Paulson is a Swedish Paralympic alpine skier. She represented Sweden in Paralympic Alpine skiing, at the 1994 Paralympic Winter Games, 1998 Paralympic Winter Games, and 2002 Paralympic Winter Games. She won four medals: two silvers and two bronzes.

== Career ==
She competed at the 1994 Winter Paralympics, in Lillehammer, with 1: 43.07 Paulson finished sixth in the super-G LWX-XII, behind Sarah Will in 1:26.67, Gerda Pamler in 1: 28.24, Stephanie Riche in 1: 37.99, Vreni Stoeckli in 1: 38.03 and Sandra Mittelholzer in 1:41.62. She competed in Women's slalom LWX-XII, and Women's giant slalom LWX-XII, but did not finish.

At the 1998 Winter Paralympics, in Nagano, Paulson won two bronze medals: in the super-G race, with a realized time of 1:13.33 (gold for Sarah Will in 1: 09.49 and silver for Kuniko Obinata in 1: 11.24), and downhill LW10-11 in 1:31.29 (on the podium in front of her, Kuniko Obinata with 1:18.00 and Sarah Will in 1:19.02).

At the 2002 Winter Paralympics, in Salt Lake City, Paulson won two silver medals, slalom LW10-12, and giant slalom LW12. She placed 4th in super-G LW10-12, and downhill LW10-12.
