= Alpine skiing at the 2006 Winter Paralympics – Women's slalom =

Alpine skiing - Women's slalom at the IX Paralympic Winter Games
- Venue: Sestriere
- Dates: 18–19 March 2006

Women's slalom events at the 2006 Winter Paralympics were contested at Sestriere on 18 and 19 March.

There were 3 events. Each was contested by skiers from a range of disability classes, and the standings were decided by applying a disability factor to the actual times achieved. All times shown below are calculated times, except for the final "Real time" column.

== Visually impaired ==
The visually impaired event took place on 19 March. It was won by Pascale Casanova, representing France.

Rank	Name	Country	Class	Run1	Run2	Result	Diff	Real time
1st place, gold medalist(s)	Pascale Casanova; Guide: Benedicte Sainas	France	B2	51.22 (1)	46.15 (2)	1:37.37		2:01.77
2nd place, silver medalist(s)	Sabine Gasteiger; Guide: Emil Gasteiger	Austria	B3	53.21 (2)	45.18 (1)	1:38.39	+1.02	1:56.90
3rd place, bronze medalist(s)	Silvia Parente; Guide: Lorenzo Migliari	Italy	B1	53.41 (3)	48.05 (3)	1:41.46	+4.09	3:14.19
4	Natasha De Troyer; Guide: Eric Maurice Dejager	Belgium	B2	55.17 (4)	51.31 (4)	1:46.48	+9.11	2:13.16
5	Carmen Garcia Rigav; Guide: Marina Romero	Spain	B3	58.79 (5)	55.00 (5)	1:53.79	+16.42	2:15.20
6	Anna Cohi; Guide: Marc Oliveras	Spain	B3	1:02.70 (6)	57.00 (6)	1:59.70	+22.33	2:22.22
7	Anna Coma; Guide: Francisco Manuel Borromeo	Spain	B1	1:04.55 (9)	57.70 (7)	2:02.25	+24.88	3:53.97
8	Francesca Ramirez; Guide: Manel Fernandez	Andorra	B2	1:13.05 (10)	1:06.39 (8)	2:19.44	+42.07	2:54.38

== Sitting ==
The sitting event took place on 19 March. It was won by Stephani Victor, representing United States.

Rank	Name	Country	Class	Run1	Run2	Result	Diff	Real time
1st place, gold medalist(s)	Stephani Victor	United States	LW12-2	56.58 (1)	51.96 (4)	1:48.54		2:16.69
2nd place, silver medalist(s)	Daila Dameno	Italy	LW10-2	58.19 (2)	51.34 (1)	1:49.53	+0.99	2:36.25
3rd place, bronze medalist(s)	Tatsuko Aoki	Japan	LW10-2	59.63 (3)	51.76 (2)	1:51.39	+2.85	2:38.91
4	Lacey Heward	United States	LW11	1:00.79 (6)	52.77 (5)	1:53.56	+5.02	2:28.63
5	Christiane Singhammer	Germany	LW12-2	1:00.51 (5)	53.07 (6)	1:53.58	+5.04	2:23.03
6	Claudia Loesch	Austria	LW11	1:00.46 (4)	53.81 (7)	1:54.27	+5.73	2:29.55
7	Laurie Stephens	United States	LW12-1	1:03.07 (7)	51.82 (3)	1:54.89	+6.35	2:26.64
8	Yoshiko Tanaka	Japan	LW12-2	1:05.70 (8)	59.76 (8)	2:05.46	+16.92	2:38.00
9	Agnes Vass	Hungary	LW11	1:13.36 (10)	1:04.85 (9)	2:18.21	+29.67	3:00.88
-	Kimberly Joines	Canada	LW12-1	1:13.25 (9)	DNS			
-	Kuniko Obinata	Japan	LW12-2	DNF				

== Standing ==
The standing event took place on 18 March. It was won by Allison Jones, representing United States.

Rank	Name	Country	Class	Run1	Run2	Result	Diff	Real time
1st place, gold medalist(s)	Allison Jones	United States	LW2	48.24 (3)	41.90 (1)	1:30.14		1:30.14
2nd place, silver medalist(s)	Solène Jambaqué	France	LW9-2	47.78 (1)	44.83 (4)	1:32.61	+2.47	1:43.78
3rd place, bronze medalist(s)	Sandy Dukat	United States	LW2	50.01 (5)	43.65 (2)	1:33.66	+3.52	1:33.66
4	Andrea Rothfuss	Germany	LW6/8-2	50.37 (6)	44.53 (3)	1:34.90	+4.76	1:35.76
5	Iveta Chlebakova	Slovakia	LW6/8-2	49.90 (4)	45.48 (5)	1:35.38	+5.24	1:36.24
6	Elitsa Storey	United States	LW2	50.75 (7)	46.58 (7)	1:37.33	+7.19	1:37.33
7	Petra Smarzova	Slovakia	LW6/8-2	51.99 (8)	45.89 (6)	1:37.88	+7.74	1:38.77
8	Evgenia Ponomareva	Russia	LW6/8-2	52.54 (10)	47.20 (9)	1:39.74	+9.60	1:40.65
9	Inga Medvedeva	Russia	LW2	52.60 (11)	48.06 (10)	1:40.66	+10.52	1:40.66
10	Theresa Kempfle	Germany	LW6/8-2	52.19 (9)	49.01 (11)	1:41.20	+11.06	1:42.11
11	Danja Haslacher	Austria	LW2	54.12 (14)	47.16 (8)	1:41.28	+11.14	1:41.28
12	Katja Saarinen	Finland	LW2	55.31 (16)	49.35 (12)	1:44.66	+14.52	1:44.66
13	Naomi Sasaki	Japan	LW6/8-2	54.33 (15)	50.46 (13)	1:44.79	+14.65	1:45.74
14	Slava Janasova	Slovakia	LW9-2	53.24 (13)	51.85 (16)	1:45.09	+14.95	1:57.77
15	Oxana Miryasova	Russia	LW2	56.67 (18)	50.50 (14)	1:47.17	+17.03	1:47.17
16	Hannah Pennington	United States	LW3-2	57.76 (19)	51.59 (15)	1:49.35	+19.21	2:03.23
17	Liz Miller	Great Britain	LW4	56.49 (17)	54.17 (17)	1:50.66	+20.52	1:51.73
-	Reinhild Möller	Germany	LW4	53.03 (12)	DNF			
-	Lauren Woolstencroft	Canada	LW3-1	47.87 (2)	DNF			
-	Arly Fogarty	Canada	LW5/7-2	DNF				
-	Emily Jansen	Australia	LW2	DNF				
