= Daniel Jansen =

Daniel Jansen, or diminutive forms thereof (Dan, Danny), may refer to:

- Dan Jansen (born 1965), American speed skater
- Dan Jansen (sledge hockey) (fl. 1994), Canadian former ice sledge hockey player
- Daniel Jansen (basketball) (born 1994), American basketball player
- Danny Jansen (born 1995), American baseball catcher
- Danny Jansen (darts player) (born 2002), Dutch darts player

== See also ==
- Daniel Jansen Van Doorn (born 1990), Canadian volleyball player
- Danni Jensen (born 1989), Danish footballer
- All page titles containing "Dan" and "Jansen"
- All page titles containing "Daniel" and "Jansen"
- All page titles containing "Danny" and "Jansen"
- Jansen (surname)
