= Liebesschmerz =

Single by Schiller

from the album Zeitgeist
- Released: 2 July 1999
- Genre: Electronica
- Label: Zeitgeist (Universal Music)
- Songwriters: Christopher von Deylen, Mirko von Schlieffen
- Producers: Christopher von Deylen, Mirko von Schlieffen

Schiller singles chronology
"Das Glockenspiel" (1998)	"Liebesschmerz" (1999)	"Ruhe" (1999)

Liebesschmerz (English: Love pain) is the second single from the 1999 Schiller debut album Zeitgeist with spoken word passages by German actor and voice actor Hans Paetsch (1909–2002). Paetsch became famous in the German-speaking countries for narrating fairy tales. The trance music single was officially released on 2 July 1999 and peaked at number 24 on German Singles Chart in 1999. The cover art shows a graphic of a heart.

An example of the spoken words:

Die Liebe kann alles verlangen, doch auch vergänglich kann sie sein.

(Translation from German: "Love can demand anything, but could also fade".)

== Track listing ==
=== Maxi single ===
No.	Title	Length
1.	"Liebesschmerz (Fernseh-Fassung)"	3:56
2.	"Liebesschmerz (Kurz-Fassung)"	3:20
3.	"Liebesschmerz (Langspiel-Fassung)"	8:54
4.	"Liebesschmerz (Intensive Schmerz-Fassung)"	7:22
5.	"Liebesschmerz (Gary D's Schmerzmittel)"	7:31

=== Vinyl ===
No.	Title	Length
1.	"Liebesschmerz (Intensive-Schmerzfassung)"	7:22
2.	"Liebesschmerz (Gary D's Schmerzmittel)"	7:31

== Credits ==
- Producer: Christopher von Deylen, Mirko von Schlieffen
- Composed by Christopher von Deylen and Mirko von Schlieffen
- Voice by Hans Paetsch
- Recorded and mixed at Sleepingroom in Hamburg

== Music video ==
The music video for "Liebesschmerz" was produced by Heimatfilm and was shot in 1999 by German director Marcus Sternberg. Director of photography was Gero Steffen. It has a length of 3:59 minutes. The video features performing dancers, some of them known from the music video of the single "Das Glockenspiel".

Other crew members:

- Lighting and Grip: Stefan Rüsenberg

== Charts ==
Chart (1999)	Peak position
Germany (Media Control AG)	24
