= Dan Henderson (disambiguation) =

Dan Henderson (born 1970) is an American mixed martial artist and wrestler.

Dan or Daniel Henderson may also refer to:

- Dan Henderson (basketball), American basketball player
- Dan Henderson (sledge hockey) (born 1965), American sledge hockey player
- Dan Fenno Henderson (1921–2001), American university professor
- Daniel Henderson (born 1991), Swedish speedway rider
- Daniel Henderson, Trance to the Sun’s drummer since 2013.
