= NSCD =

NSCD may refer to:

- National Sports Center for the Disabled, an American non-profit organisation based in Colorado
- Northern School of Contemporary Dance, a dance school in Leeds, England
- nscd - a name-server caching daemon in computer networking
