= Labrie =

Labrie is a surname. Notable people with the surname include:

- Brennan LaBrie (born 1999), American journalist
- Brian Labrie, American politician
- Christine Labrie, Canadian politician
- Daniel Labrie, Canadian ice sledge hockey player
- Fernand Labrie (1937–2019), Canadian medical researcher
- Guy Labrie (1920–1974), Canadian hockey player
- Hubert Labrie (born 1991), Canadian hockey player
- Jacques Labrie (1784–1831), Canadian politician
- James LaBrie (born 1963), Canadian vocalist
- Pierre Labrie (born 1972), Canadian poet
- Pierre-Cédric Labrie (born 1986), Canadian hockey player
- Richard LaBrie, American clinical psychologist and Emmy-nominated editor, director, producer, and writer
- Shannon LaBrie, American singer, songwriter, guitarist, and pianist
- Vincent Labrie (born 1983), Canadian speed skater
