= Pascale Casanova (skier) =

French para-alpine skier

Personal information
- Nationality: French

Sport
- Country: France
- Sport: Para-alpine skiing
- Event(s): Downhill; Slalom; Giant slalom Super-G
Medal record
Women's para-alpine skiing
Representing France
Winter Paralympics
Gold medal – first place	2006 Turin	Downhill, visually imparied
Silver medal – second place	2006 Turin	Giant slalom, visually impaired
Gold medal – first place	2006 Turin	Slalom, visually impaired
Gold medal – first place	2002 Salt Lake City	Downhill, B2-3
Bronze medal – third place	2002 Salt Lake City	Super-G, B2-3
Silver medal – second place	2002 Salt Lake City	Giant slalom, B2-3
Silver medal – second place	2002 Salt Lake City	Slalom, B2-3
Bronze medal – third place	1998 Nagano	Downhill, B1-3
Silver medal – second place	1998 Nagano	Super-G, B2
Silver medal – second place	1998 Nagano	Giant slalom, B2
Silver medal – second place	1998 Nagano	Slalom, B2

Pascale Casanova is a French Paralympic Gold medallist.

She won two gold medals, and a silver at the 2006 Winter Paralympics in Turin.

She has won eleven medals in her career.
