= Bengt-Arne Johansson =

Bengt-Arne Johansson may refer to:

- Bengt-Arne Johansson (officer) (born 1943), Swedish lieutenant-general
- Bengt-Arne Johansson (sledge hockey player), Swedish sledge hockey player
