= 2013 World Sledge Hockey Challenge =

Tournament details
- Host country: Canada
- Teams: 4

Final positions
- Champions: Canada (5th title)
- Runners-up: United States
- Third place: Russia
- Fourth place: South Korea

Tournament statistics
- Games played: 10
- Scoring leader(s): (Russia) Dmitriy Lisov

The 2013 World Sledge Hockey Challenge was the seventh edition of the semi-annual international event hosted by Hockey Canada. The event was hosted in Toronto, Ontario.

== 2013 Tournament ==
For the first time in 5 years Neither Norway or Japan would play in the tournament. Russia and South Korea would take their place

=== Round Robin ===
Korea 2 Canada 5

Russia 1 USA 2

USA 5 Korea 0

Canada 5 Russia 3

Russia 9 Korea 1

Canada 4 USA 1

=== Semi-Finals ===
Korea 1 Canada 2

Russia 1 USA 4

=== Bronze Medal Game ===
Korea 2 Russia 4

=== Gold Medal Game ===
Canada 3 USA 1

=== References ===
World Hockey Challenge Record and Guide Book
