= 2011 World Sledge Hockey Challenge =

Tournament details
- Host country: Canada
- Venue(s): London, Ontario (April); Calgary, Alberta (November)
- Dates: April and November 2011
- Teams: 4

Final positions
- Champions: Canada (April and November)
- Runners-up: Norway (April); United States (November)
- Third place: United States (April); Norway (November)
- Fourth place: Japan (April and November)

Tournament statistics
- Games played: 10

The 2011 World Sledge Hockey Challenge was the fourth and fifth edition of the semi-annual international event hosted by Hockey Canada. The event in April was hosted in London, Ontario and the November tournament was held in Calgary, Alberta.

== 2011 November Tournament ==
=== Round Robin ===
Japan 0 Canada 8

Norway 1 USA 5

USA 6 Japan 2

Canada 5 Norway 2

Norway 8 Japan 3

Canada 3 USA 1

=== Semi-Finals ===
Japan 2 Canada 9

Norway 2 USA 7

=== Bronze Medal Game ===
Japan 3 Norway 5

=== Gold Medal Game ===
Canada 4 USA 1

== 2011 April Tournament ==
=== Round Robin ===
Japan 0 Canada 12

Norway 2 USA 4

USA 10 Japan 1

Canada 14 Norway 0

Norway 7 Japan 6

Canada 3 USA 1

=== Semi-Finals ===
Japan 1 Canada 11

Norway 5 USA 4

=== Bronze Medal Game ===
Japan 1 USA 9

=== Gold Medal Game ===
Canada 8 Norway 0
