= 2009 World Sledge Hockey Challenge =

Tournament details
- Host country: Canada
- Venue(s): Charlottetown, PEI
- Dates: November 14–21, 2009
- Teams: 4

Final positions
- Champions: United States (1st title)
- Runners-up: Canada
- Third place: Norway
- Fourth place: Japan

Tournament statistics
- Games played: 8
- Goals scored: 25 (3.13 per game)
- Scoring leader(s): (Canada) Brad Bowden, (Canada) Billy Bridges (9 points)

The 2009 World Sledge Hockey Challenge was the third semi-annual international ice sledge hockey tournament organized by Hockey Canada. The event was hosted in Charlottetown, PEI for the second straight year. The same 4 teams from last year played in this years tournament.

== Round robin ==
The 4 teams played each other once in the round robin with the top 2 teams playing in the Gold Medal Game and the bottom 2 in the Bronze Medal Game.

Norway	0 - 1	Japan

Canada	4 - 0	United States

Japan	0 - 2	United States

Canada	1 - 0	Norway

Norway	0 - 3	United States

Canada	5 - 0	Japan

=== Round robin standings ===
Team	Pld	W	OTW	OTL	L	GF	GA	GD	Pts
Canada	3	3	0	0	0	10	0	+10	9
United States	3	2	0	0	1	5	4	+1	6
Japan	3	1	0	0	2	1	7	−6	3
Norway	3	0	0	0	3	0	5	−5	0

Source:Para Hockey Cup Guide and Record Book

=== Playoffs ===
==== Bronze-medal game ====
Norway	4 - 0	Japan

==== Gold-medal game ====
United States	3 - 2 (OT)	Canada

=== Final standings ===
	Team
1st place, gold medalist(s)	United States
2nd place, silver medalist(s)	Canada
3rd place, bronze medalist(s)	Norway
4th	Japan
