= Matthew Butson =

New Zealand para-alpine skier

Personal information
- Nationality: New Zealand
Medal record
Men's para alpine skiing
Representing New Zealand
Paralympic Games
Gold medal – first place	1998 Nagano	Giant Slalom LW9
Gold medal – first place	1998 Nagano	Slalom LW9
Gold medal – first place	1998 Nagano	Super-G LW9
Silver medal – second place	1998 Nagano	Downhill LW1,3,5/7,9

Matthew Butson is a Paralympic medalist from New Zealand who competed in alpine skiing. He competed in the 1998 Winter Paralympics where he won three gold medals in Giant Slalom, Slalom and Super G, and a silver in Downhill.
