= Czech Republic at the 1998 Winter Paralympics =

- IPC code: CZE
- NPC: Czech Paralympic Committee
- Website: www.paralympic.cz

in Nagano
- Competitors: 6 in 2 sports
- Medals Ranked 13th: Gold 3 Silver 3 Bronze 1 Total 7

Winter Paralympics appearances (overview)
- 1994; 1998; 2002; 2006; 2010; 2014; 2018; 2022; 2026

Other related appearances
- Czechoslovakia (1976–1992)

Czech Republic competed at the 1998 Winter Paralympics in Nagano, Japan. 6 competitors from Czech Republic won 7 medals including 3 gold, 3 silver and 1 bronze and finished 13th in the medal table.

== Medalists ==
Medal	Name	Sport	Event
Gold	Kateřina Teplá	Alpine skiing	Women's Super-G B1,3
Gold	Kateřina Teplá	Alpine skiing	Women's Giant slalom B1,3
Gold	Kateřina Teplá	Alpine skiing	Women's Slalom B1,3
Silver	Kateřina Teplá	Alpine skiing	Women's Downhill B1-3
Silver	Sabina Rogie	Alpine skiing	Women's Giant slalom B1,3
Silver	Sabina Rogie	Alpine skiing	Women's Slalom B1,3
Bronze	Sabina Rogie	Alpine skiing	Women's Super-G B1,3

== Competitors ==
The following is the list of number of competitors participating at the Games per sport/discipline.

Sport	Men	Women	Total
Alpine skiing	3	2	5
Cross-country skiing	0	1	1
Total	3	3	6

== Alpine skiing ==
5 athletes competed in alpine skiing.

Men

Athlete	Events	Final		
Athlete	Events	Real time	Calculated time	Rank
Stanislav Loska	Men's Downhill LW6/8	1:08.62	1:08.62	5
Stanislav Loska	Men's Super-G LW6/8	1:14.26	1:14.26	7
Stanislav Loska	Men's Giant slalom LW6/8	DNQ		
Stanislav Loska	Men's Slalom LW6/8	1:56.28	1:55.51	4
Vladislav Urban	Men's downhill LW6/8	1:13.83	1:13.83	17
Vladislav Urban	Men's Super-G LW6/8	DNF		
Jan Dostál	Men's Downhill LW2	1:20.44	1:15.73	20
Jan Dostál	Men's Super-G LW2	1:28.61	1:21.08	14
Jan Dostál	Men's Giant slalom LW2	DNF		
Jan Dostál	Men's Slalom LW2	2:08.04	2:08.04	13

Women

Athlete	Events	Final		
Athlete	Events	Real time	Calculated time	Rank
Kateřina Teplá; Guide: Pavel Teplý	Women's Downhill B1-3	1:26.25	1:12.98	Silver medal
Kateřina Teplá; Guide: Pavel Teplý	Women's Super-G B1-3	1:17.62	1:11.57	Gold medal
Kateřina Teplá; Guide: Pavel Teplý	Women's Giant slalom B1-3	2:56.79	2:44.26	Gold medal
Kateřina Teplá; Guide: Pavel Teplý	Women's Slalom B1-3	2:26.04	2:14.85	Gold medal
Sabina Rogie; Guide: Michal Karásek	Women's Downhill B1-3	1:33.23	1:18.88	6
Sabina Rogie; Guide: Michal Karásek	Women's Super-G B1-3	1:19.01	1:12.85	Bronze medal
Sabina Rogie; Guide: Michal Karásek	Women's Giant slalom B1-3	3:05.56	2:52.41	Silver medal
Sabina Rogie; Guide: Michal Karásek	Women's Slalom B1-3	2:30.34	2:18.82	Silver medal

== Cross-country skiing ==
1 athlete competed in cross-country skiing.

Women

Athlete	Events	Final	
Athlete	Events	Time	Rank
Miroslava Sedláčková	Women's 5 km Classical Technique B2-3	21:10.80	10
Miroslava Sedláčková	Women's 5 km Free Technique B2-3	19:18.10	11
Miroslava Sedláčková	Women's 15 km Classical Technique B1-3	1:11:33.70	14

== See also ==
- Czech Republic at the Paralympics
- Czech Republic at the 1998 Winter Olympics
