= 2012 World Sledge Hockey Challenge =

Tournament details
- Host country: Canada
- Teams: 4

Final positions
- Champions: United States (2nd title)
- Runners-up: Canada
- Third place: Norway
- Fourth place: Japan

Tournament statistics
- Games played: 10
- Scoring leader(s): (Canada) Billy Bridges

The 2012 World Sledge Hockey Challenge was the sixth edition of the semi-annual international event hosted by Hockey Canada. The event was hosted in Calgary, Alberta.

== 2012 Tournament ==
The same 4 teams would compete for the fifth straight tournament.

=== Round Robin ===
Japan 0 Canada 11

Norway 1 USA 3

USA 8 Japan 0

Canada 4 Norway 1

Norway 1 Japan 0 (OT)

Canada 2 USA 1

=== Semi-Finals ===
Japan 0 Canada 10

Norway 1 USA 4

=== Bronze Medal Game ===
Japan 0 Norway 5

=== Gold Medal Game ===
Canada 0 USA 1
