= Knut Erling Granaas =

Norwegian ice sledge hockey player

- Born: 21 April 1967 (age 59) Asker
- National team: Norway
Medal record
Para ice hockey
Representing Norway
Winter Paralympic Games
Silver medal – second place	1994 Lillehammer	Team competition
Gold medal – first place	1998 Nagano	Team competition
Silver medal – second place	2002 Salt Lake City	Team competition

Knut Erling Granaas (born 21 April 1967 in Asker) is a Norwegian sledge hockey goaltender.

He lost both legs in a traffic accident, and began to compete in sledge hockey in 1992. He has won a gold medal (1998) and two silver medals (1994, 2002) at the Winter Paralympics.

== Honours ==
- 2002 Winter Paralympics
  - Silver
- 2000 World Championships
  - Silver
- 1998 Winter Paralympics
  - Gold
- 1996 World Championships
  - Silver
- 1994 Winter Paralympics
  - Silver

== Awards ==
- 2005 – Norges Funksjonshemmedes Idrettsforbunds Idrettsplakett
