= Gerd Schönfelder =

German para-alpine skier

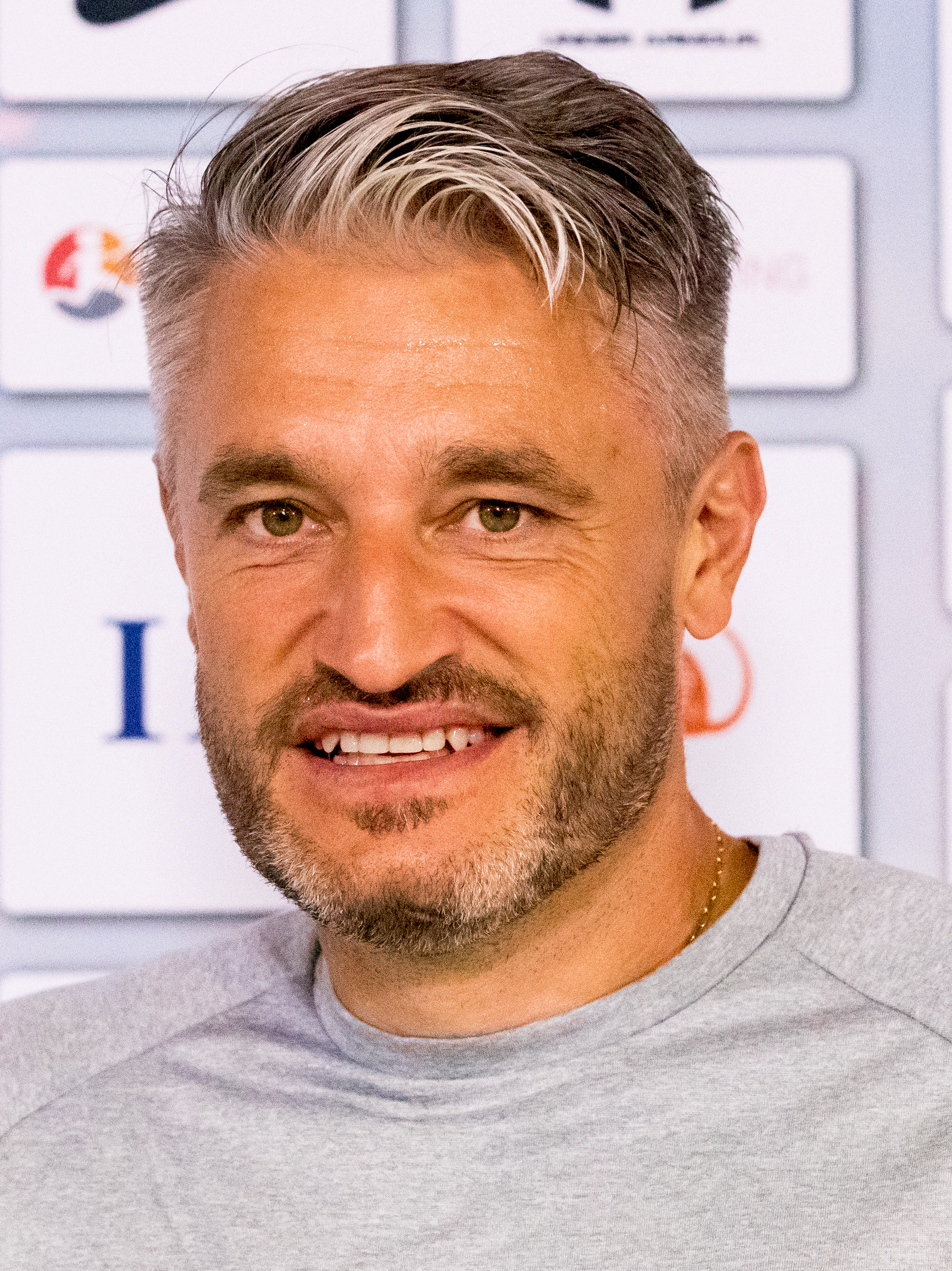
- Schönfelder in 2019

Medal record

Men's para alpine skiing

Representing Germany

Paralympic Games
Gold medal – first place	1992 Albertville	Giant slalom, LW1,3,5/7,9
Gold medal – first place	1992 Albertville	Downhill, LW1,3,5/7,9
Gold medal – first place	1992 Albertville	Super-G, LW1,3,5/7,9
Gold medal – first place	1994 Lillehammer	Downhill, LW5/7
Gold medal – first place	1994 Lillehammer	Slalom, LW5/7
Gold medal – first place	1998 Nagano	Slalom, LW1,3,5/7
Gold medal – first place	2002 Salt Lake City	Downhill, LW3,5/7,9
Gold medal – first place	2002 Salt Lake City	Giant slalom, LW3,5/7,9
Gold medal – first place	2002 Salt Lake City	Slalom, LW3,5/7,9
Gold medal – first place	2002 Salt Lake City	Super-G, LW3,5/7,9
Gold medal – first place	2006 Turin	Downhill, standing
Gold medal – first place	2006 Turin	Giant slalom, standing
Gold medal – first place	2010 Vancouver	Downhill, standing
Gold medal – first place	2010 Vancouver	Super-G, standing
Gold medal – first place	2010 Vancouver	Giant slalom, standing
Gold medal – first place	2010 Vancouver	Super combined, standing
Silver medal – second place	1994 Lillehammer	Super-G, LW5/7
Silver medal – second place	1994 Lillehammer	Giant slalom, LW5/7
Silver medal – second place	2006 Turin	Super-G, standing
Silver medal – second place	2010 Vancouver	Slalom, standing
Bronze medal – third place	1998 Nagano	Giant slalom, LW1,3,5/7
Bronze medal – third place	2006 Turin	Slalom, standing

Gerd Schönfelder (born 2 September 1970 in Kulmain) is a German para-alpine skier, one of the most decorated in the sport's history.

== Biography ==
Gerd Schönfelder was born as the middle of three children; he has an older sister as well as a younger brother. During his youth he already did many types of sports, including skiing. However, prior to his accident he never had interest making a career out of it.

On 11 September 1989 Schönfelder tried to catch a train in Hersbruck which was already leaving the station. Back then it was still possible to open the doors while it was in motion. However, due to holding his jacket in his left hand, he wasn't able to get in. While making every attempt to open the door, Schönfelder stumbled, his right leg was stuck between the carriages and he got dragged below the train. He ducked, but due to him lying on the shoulder and his left hand laying on the rails by accident, he was hit by the train's bottom. In spite of his severe injuries, he got up by himself and was taken to the hospital in Erlangen. The doctors were able to save his life, however, they had to amputate both his right arm (including the shoulder) and all fingers of his left hand except the thumb. Even though it seemed like he could do nothing by himself anymore, his friends helped him to find joy in life again, they even would build a motorcycle he could use with the remainder of his hand. He also played soccer and eventually got into skiing. Eventually he heard of the Paralympics and due to his young age, he decided to make it a career. Also, in early 1991, through an operation, his left toe was transplanted on his hand, so that he could grab things again and manage life by himself.

Schönfelder won his first three gold medals at the 1992 Winter Paralympics. He has won an overall of sixteen gold medals at the Winter Paralympics, including four gold medals at the Salt Lake 2002 Games as well as four gold medals at the Vancouver 2010 Games and has won 22 Paralympic medals in his career. For his performance at the 2010 Games Schonfelder was won Best Male at the Paralympic Sports Awards.

He retired from skiing in January 2011.

== See also ==
- Athletes with most gold medals in one event at the Paralympic Games
