= International Para Hockey Cup =

Annual hockey tournament in the Czech Republic

- Current season, competition or edition: 2026 Para Hockey Cup
- Sport: Sledge hockey
- First season: 2021
- Most recent champion: Canada
- Most titles: United States (4)
- Related competitions: World Para Ice Hockey Championships; Paralympics; Para Hockey Cup

The International Para Hockey Cup, is an annual Para Ice Hockey (formerly, ice sledge hockey) tournament hosted in Ostrava, Czech Republic. The tournament is an invitational format that brings four Para ice hockey teams together for an international competition.

The tournament features four teams per year and has seen teams from the Czech Republic, Russia, Canada, the United States, and Italy.

== History ==
The tournament was created in 2021. The idea behind the tournament was to give an opportunity for additional international-level play.

The inaugural 2021 tournament was projected to feature four teams – Czech Republic, Canada, United States and Russia. Due to the on-going COVID-19 pandemic Canada and the USA withdrew from the tournament, leaving only Czech Republic and Russia. The 2021 tournament ultimately would be a five-game series between the Czech Republic and Russia, with Russia winning all five games.

The 2022 and 2023 tournaments would see Czech Republic, Canada, United States and a "blended team" branded as the International Para Hockey Team or IPH Team. The USA would beat Canada in both gold medal matches.

The 2024 tournament would welcome Italy for the first time in place of the IPH Team. It was held under the patronage of the Embassy of Canada in Prague. The USA would again beat Canada in the gold medal match.

== Champions ==
Year	1st place, gold medalist(s)	2nd place, silver medalist(s)	3rd place, bronze medalist(s)	4th	Host
2021	Russia	Czech Republic			RT Torax Arena, Ostrava
2022	United States	Canada	(International Paralympic Committee) IPH Team	Czech Republic	RT Torax Arena, Ostrava
2023	United States	Canada	Czech Republic	(International Paralympic Committee) IPH Team	Ostravar Aréna, Ostrava
2024	United States	Canada	Czech Republic	Italy	Ostravar Aréna, Ostrava
2025	United States	Canada	Czech Republic	China	Ovintiv Events Centre, Dawson Creek
2026	Canada	United States	Czech Republic	Team World	Nymburk Winter Stadium, Nymburk

== Medal table ==
Country	(gold) Gold	(silver) Silver	(bronze) Bronze	Medals
United States	4	1	0	5
Canada	1	4	0	5
Czech Republic	0	1	4	5
Russia	1	0	0	1
Italy	0	0	0	0

== Year by Year ==
=== 2021 ===
The tournament took place at RT Torax Arena in Ostrava from December 12 to 18, 2021.

- Czech Republic 0–4 Russia
- Russia 8–1 Czech Republic
- Czech Republic 0–6 Russia
- Russia 7–1 Czech Republic
- Czech Republic 0–6 Russia

=== 2022 ===
The tournament took place at RT Torax Arena in Ostrava from September 24 to 30, 2022.

Round Robin

Saturday, September 24, 2022

- IPH Team 1 - 9 USA
- Czech Republic 0 - 3 Canada

Sunday, September 25, 2022

- IPH Team 2 - 5 Canada
- Czech Republic 0 - 10 USA

Tuesday, September 27, 2022

- Canada 2 - 8 USA
- IPH Team 2 - 3 Czech Republic

Standing

1. USA, 6 points
2. Canada, 4 points
3. Czech Republic, 2 points
4. IPH Team, 0 point

Semifinals

Wednesday, September 28, 2022

- USA 10 - 1 IPH Team
- Canada 4 - 1 Czech Republic

Friday, September 30, 2022

Bronze Medal Game
Czech Republic 2 - 3 IPH Team
Gold Medal Game
USA 4 - 0 Canada

=== 2023 ===
The tournament took place at Ostravar Arena in Ostrava from October 2 to 8, 2023.

Round Robin

Monday, October 2, 2023

- IPH Team 0 - 6 USA
- Canada 2 - 1 Czech Republic

Tuesday, October 3, 2023

- Canada 1 - 6 USA
- Czech Republic 2 - 1 IPH Team

Thursday, October 5, 2023

- IPH Team 7 - 5 Canada
- Czech Republic 1 - 4 USA

Standing

1. USA, 9 points
2. Canada, 3 points
3. Czech Republic, 3 points
4. IPH Team, 3 point

Semifinals

Saturday, October 7, 2023

- Canada 4 - 1 IPH Team
- Czech Republic 1 - 6 USA

Sunday, October 8, 2023

Bronze Medal Game
IPH Team 1 - 2 Czech Republic
Gold Medal Game
USA 4 - 1 Canada

=== 2024 ===
The tournament took place at Ostravar Arena in Ostrava from October 7 to 13, 2024.

Round Robin

Monday, October 7, 2024

- Italy 0 - 9 Canada
- Czech Republic 0 - 8 USA

Tuesday, October 8, 2024

- USA 2 - 1 Canada (OT)
- Italy 1 - 2 Czech Republic

Thursday, October 10, 2024

- USA 2 - 0 Italy
- Canada 3 - 2 Czech Republic

Standing

1. USA, 8 points
2. Canada, 7 points
3. Czech Republic, 3 points
4. Italy, 0 point

Semifinals

Saturday, October 12, 2024

- Italy 0 - 6 USA
- Czech Republic 0 - 1 Canada (OT)

Sunday, October 13, 2024

Bronze Medal Game
Italy 1 - 2 Czech Republic
Gold Medal Game
USA 5 - 3 Canada

== See also ==
- International Paralympic Committee
