= Alpine skiing at the 1998 Winter Paralympics =

Alpine skiing at the VII Paralympic Winter Games

Alpine skiing at the 1998 Winter Paralympics consisted of 54 events, 35 for men and 19 for women.

== Medal table ==
Rank	Nation	Gold	Silver	Bronze	Total
1	United States	13	8	11	32
2	Spain	8	0	0	8
3	Switzerland	7	4	4	15
4	Austria	6	12	10	28
5	Germany	5	5	6	16
6	New Zealand	4	1	1	6
7	Czech Republic	3	3	1	7
8	Italy	3	2	3	8
9	Japan	2	2	1	5
10	Canada	1	6	5	12
11	Australia	1	0	1	2
12	Russia	1	0	0	1
13	France	0	6	4	10
14	Slovakia	0	5	4	9
15	Sweden	0	0	3	3
Totals (15 entries)		54	54	54	162

== Medal summary ==
The competition events were:

- Downhill: men – women
- Super-G: men – women
- Giant slalom: men – women
- Slalom: men – women

Each event had separate standing, sitting, or visually impaired classifications:

- LW2 - standing: single leg amputation above the knee
- LW 3 - standing: double leg amputation below the knee, mild cerebral palsy, or equivalent impairment
- LW4 - standing: single leg amputation below the knee
- LW5/7 - standing: double arm amputation
- LW6/8 - standing: single arm amputation
- LW9 - standing: amputation or equivalent impairment of one arm and one leg
- LW10 - sitting: paraplegia with no or some upper abdominal function and no functional sitting balance
- LW11 - sitting: paraplegia with fair functional sitting balance
- B1 - visually impaired: no functional vision
- B2 - visually impaired: up to ca 3-5% functional vision
- B3 - visually impaired: under 10% functional vision

=== Men's events ===
Event	Class	Gold	Silver	Bronze
Downhill	B1,3	Juan Carlos Molina; Guide: Spain	Gianmaria Dal Maistro; Guide: Italy	Bruno Oberhammer; Guide: Italy
Downhill	B2	Gerhard Pscheider; Guide: Austria	Kurt Primus; Guide: Austria	Stefan Kopcik; Guide: Slovakia
Downhill	LW1,3,5/7,9	James Patterson; Australia	Matthew Butson; New Zealand	Jozef Mistina; Slovakia
Downhill	LW2	Greg Mannino; United States	Andreas Schmid; Austria	Fritz Berger; Switzerland
Downhill	LW4	Hans Burn; Switzerland	Hubert Mandl; Austria	Robert Meusburger; Austria
Downhill	LW6/8	Rolf Heinzmann; Switzerland	Markus Pfefferle; Germany	Frank Pfortmueller; Germany
Downhill	LW10	Chris Waddell; United States	Gustav Gross; Germany	Ronny Persson; Sweden
Downhill	LW11	John Davis; United States	Raynald Riu; France	Daniel Wesley; Canada
Super-G	B1,3	Angelo Zanotti; Guide: Italy	Jean-Noel Arbez; Guide: France	Bruno Oberhammer; Guide: Italy
Super-G	B2	Eric Villalon; Guide: Spain	Kurt Primus; Guide: Austria	Stefan Kopcik; Guide: Slovakia
Super-G	LW1,3,5/7	Kevin O'Sullivan; New Zealand	Jacob Rife; United States	Jozef Mistina; Slovakia
Super-G	LW2	Greg Mannino; United States	Michael Hipp; Germany	Juerg Gadient; Switzerland
Super-G	LW4	Hubert Mandl; Austria	Hans Burn; Switzerland	Mark Ludbrook; Canada
Super-G	LW6/8	Rolf Heinzmann; Switzerland	Markus Pfefferle; Germany	Frank Pfortmueller; Germany
Super-G	LW9	Matthew Butson; New Zealand	Arno Hirschbuehl; Austria	George Sansonetis; United States
Super-G	LW10	Gustav Gross; Germany	Chris Waddell; United States	Martin Braxenthaler; Germany
Super-G	LW11	Daniel Wesley; Canada	Stacy William Kohut; Canada	Raynald Riu; France
Giant slalom	B1,3	Angelo Zanotti; Guide: Italy	Gianmaria Dal Maistro; Guide: Italy	Jean-Noel Arbez; Guide: France
Giant slalom	B2	Eric Villalon; Guide: Spain	Stefan Kopcik; Guide: Slovakia	Gerhard Pscheider; Guide: Austria
Giant slalom	LW1,3,5/7	Alexei Moshkine; Russia	Jozef Mistina; Slovakia	Gerd Schoenfelder; Germany
Giant slalom	LW2	Jason Lalla; United States	Monte Meier; United States	Greg Mannino; United States
Giant slalom	LW4	Hans Burn; Switzerland	Michael Bruegger; Switzerland	Steven Bayley; New Zealand
Giant slalom	LW6/8	Rolf Heinzmann; Switzerland	Markus Pfefferle; Germany	Wolfgang Moosbrugger; Austria
Giant slalom	LW9	Matthew Butson; New Zealand	George Sansonetis; United States	Gilles Place; France
Giant slalom	LW10	Gustav Gross; Germany	Andreas Schiestl; Austria	Reinhold Sager; Austria
Giant slalom	LW11	Klaus Salzmann; Austria	Stacy William Kohut; Canada	Karl Lotz; Germany
Slalom	B1,3	Bruno Oberhammer; Guide: Italy	Jean-Noel Arbez; Guide: France	Gianmaria Dal Maistro; Guide: Italy
Slalom	B2	Eric Villalon; Guide: Spain	Stefan Kopcik; Guide: Slovakia	Kurt Primus; Guide: Austria
Slalom	LW1,3,5/7	Gerd Schoenfelder; Germany	Jozef Mistina; Slovakia	Jacob Rife; United States
Slalom	LW2	Monte Meier; United States	Fritz Berger; Switzerland	Juerg Gadient; Switzerland
Slalom	LW4	Hans Burn; Switzerland	Hubert Mandl; Austria	James Lagerstrom; United States
Slalom	LW6/8	Rolf Heinzmann; Switzerland	Robert Durcan; Slovakia	Markus Pfefferle; Germany
Slalom	LW9	Matthew Butson; New Zealand	Arno Hirschbuehl; Austria	James Patterson; Australia
Slalom	LW10	Masahiro Shitaka; Japan	Chris Waddell; United States	Reinhold Sager; Austria
Slalom	LW11	Juergen Egle; Austria	Stacy William Kohut; Canada	Hans Joerg Arnold; Switzerland

=== Women's events ===
Event	Class	Gold	Silver	Bronze
Downhill	B1-3	Magda Amo; Guide: Ana Casas; Spain	Katerina Tepla; Guide: Pavel Teply; Czech Republic	Pascale Casanova; Guide: Mikael Genin; France
Downhill	LW2	Sarah Billmeier; United States	Nicola Lechner; Austria	Maggie Behle; United States
Downhill	LW3,4,6/8	Jennifer Kelchner; United States	Mary Riddell; United States	Nadja Obrist; Austria
Downhill	LW10-11	Kuniko Obinata; Japan	Sarah Will; United States	Cecilia Paulson; Sweden
Super-G	B1,3	Katerina Tepla; Guide: Pavel Teply; Czech Republic	Marilyn Winder; Guide: Dale Winder; Canada	Sabina Rogie; Guide: Michal Karasek; Czech Republic
Super-G	B2	Magda Amo; Guide: Ana Casas; Spain	Pascale Casanova; Guide: Mikael Genin; France	Elisabeth Dos-Kellner; Guide: Susanne Wastian; Austria
Super-G	LW2	Danja Haslacher; Austria	Sarah Billmeier; United States	Nicola Lechner; Austria
Super-G	LW3,4,5/7,6/8	Reinhild Moeller; Germany	Karolina Wisniewska; Canada	Mary Riddell; United States
Super-G	LW10-11	Sarah Will; United States	Kuniko Obinata; Japan	Cecilia Paulson; Sweden
Giant slalom	B1,3	Katerina Tepla; Guide: Pavel Teply; Czech Republic	Sabina Rogie; Guide: Michal Karasek; Czech Republic	Marilyn Winder; Guide: Dale Winder; Canada
Giant slalom	B2	Magda Amo; Guide: Ana Casas; Spain	Pascale Casanova; Guide: Mikael Genin; France	Elisabeth Dos-Kellner; Guide: Susanne Wastian; Austria
Giant slalom	LW2	Danja Haslacher; Austria	Nicola Lechner; Austria	Sarah Billmeier; United States
Giant slalom	LW3,4,5/7,6/8	Mary Riddell; United States	Karolina Wisniewska; Canada	Ramona Hoh; Canada
Giant slalom	LW10-11	Sarah Will; United States	Vreni Stoeckli; Switzerland	Kuniko Obinata; Japan
Slalom	B1,3	Katerina Tepla; Guide: Pavel Teply; Czech Republic	Sabina Rogie; Guide: Michal Karasek; Czech Republic	Marilyn Winder; Guide: Dale Winder; Canada
Slalom	B2	Magda Amo; Guide: Ana Casas; Spain	Pascale Casanova; Guide: Mikael Genin; France	Theresa Fancher; Guide: Jon-Pierre Wolfenden; United States
Slalom	LW2	Sarah Billmeier; United States	Nicola Lechner; Austria	Maggie Behle; United States
Slalom	LW3,4,5/7,6/8	Reinhild Moeller; Germany	Nadja Obrist; Austria	Mary Riddell; United States
Slalom	LW10-11	Sarah Will; United States	Tatsuko Aoki; Japan	Muffy Davis; United States

== See also ==
- Alpine skiing at the 1998 Winter Olympics
