= Sandy Dukat =

American Paralympic athlete

Personal information
- Full name: Sandra Dukat
- Nationality: American
- Born: May 3, 1972 (age 54) Canton, Ohio, U.S.

Sport
- Country: United States
- Sport: Alpine skiing, triathlon, distance running
- Disability: Above-knee amputee
Medal record
Representing the United States
Women's para-alpine skiing
Paralympic Games
Bronze medal – third place	2002 Salt Lake	Slalom LW2
Bronze medal – third place	2002 Salt Lake	Super-G LW2
Bronze medal – third place	2006 Torino	Slalom standing
IPC Alpine Skiing World Championships
Bronze medal – third place	2004 Wildschonau	Downhill
Bronze medal – third place	2004 Wildschonau	Super-G
Bronze medal – third place	2004 Wildschonau	Giant slalom
Women's paratriathlon
ITU Triathlon World Championships
Gold medal – first place	2008 Vancouver	AWAD PC2
USA Paratriathlon National Championships
Gold medal – first place	2007	Above Knee
Gold medal – first place	2008	Above Knee
Gold medal – first place	2009	TRI-2
Gold medal – first place	2010	TRI-2
- Updated on February 6, 2013

Sandra "Sandy" Dukat (born May 3, 1972) is an American Paralympic athlete. Born with proximal femoral focal deficiency, she had her right leg amputated above the knee at the age of four. She has competed internationally in alpine skiing, swimming and triathlon. As of February 2013, she holds the marathon world record for above-knee amputee women.

== Sporting career ==
Dukat grew up competing in able-bodied sports. She played basketball, high-jumped and was on her high school swim team. When she called the Rehabilitation Institute of Chicago (RIC) looking for an amputee support group, she found out about their sports teams. It was only then that she learned that Paralympic sport existed.

=== Swimming ===
In 1996, Dukat joined the swim team at the RIC. In 1997, she won 2 silver and 1 bronze medals at the USA National Championships, and won her classification at the National 5K Disabled Open Water Invitational. She was named to the US Disabled Swim Team in 1998. At the 1998 Disabled World Swimming Championships, she broke the then S9 American record in the 800 metre freestyle event and was co-captain of the US Team. She did not, however, make finals at the meet.

=== Skiing ===
Dukat first became interested in skiing in 1997, after attending the Disabled Sports USA Hartford Ski Spectacular. She started to ski in the RIC Paralympic Sports Program, then committed to training 6 months of each year at the National Sports Center for the Disabled in Colorado. Dukat won two bronze medals for alpine skiing at the 2002 Winter Paralympics in Salt Lake City and one bronze medal at the 2006 Winter Paralympics in Turin. At the 2004 IPC Alpine Skiing World Championships, she won bronze medals in 3 events, downhill, Giant slalom and Super-G. She had success in the IPC Alpine Skiing World Cup, achieving many podium finishes; in the 2003–2004 season, she finished fifth overall.

Dukat retired from competitive skiing in 2007.

=== Triathlon ===
Dukat turned to triathlon as a way to keep motivated and active during the skiing off-season.

In 2003, she won the Physically Challenged division of the Olympic distance St Anthony's triathlon. In 2004, she was named to the US Paralympic Triathlon Development Team. She was on the USA Triathlon Physically Challenged National Team in 2008.

Dukat won the women's Above Knee division of the USA Triathlon Paratriathlon National Championships in 2007, 2008, 2009 and 2010. In 2008, she represented the US at the ITU Triathlon World Championships in Vancouver. She became 2008 World Champion in her above knee impairment classification, and was named 2008 USA Triathlon Paratriathlete of the Year.

=== Running ===
Having previously competed in 5K, 10K and half marathon races, Dukat ran her first marathon in January 2009. She was paced by training partner and below-knee amputee world record holder Amy Palmiero-Winters. With a time of 4:40:46, she was the first female above-knee amputee to finish a marathon in less than 5 hours.

== Personal life ==
In 2007, Dukat was one of five disabled female alpine skiers who climbed Mount Kilimanjaro as a fundraiser, starting a scholarship program for disabled female alpine skiers at the National Sports Center for the Disabled in Colorado.

Dukat attended Wittenberg University in Springfield, Ohio. For a number of years, she worked as an information specialist for the National Center on Physical Activity and Disability. She now works at The Hartford, liaising with US Paralympics. In this role, she won the USOC's Amazing Impact Award for The Hartford's 'Achieve Without Limits' campaign in 2011.

In 2023, she was inducted into the Wittenberg Athletics Hall of Honor.
