= Ken Babey =

Canadian ice hockey coach

- Born: October 24, 1954 (age 72); Saskatoon, Saskatchewan, Canada
- Education: BA, 1979, University of Saskatchewan; MA, University of Montana
- Occupation: Ice hockey coach

Ken Babey (born October 24, 1954) is a Canadian ice hockey coach. He spent 27 seasons as the head coach of the men's hockey team at the Southern Alberta Institute of Technology, finishing his career with numerous records. Babey was also chosen to coach Canada men's national ice sledge hockey (now para ice hockey) team, where he helped them defeat the United States to capture a gold medal at the 2017 World Para Ice Hockey Championships.

== Early life ==
Babey was born on October 24, 1954, in Saskatoon, Saskatchewan. He played junior hockey with the Saskatoon Quakers before suffering a career-ending shoulder injury. Babey graduated from the University of Saskatchewan in 1979 and relocated to Calgary.

== Career ==
While obtaining his Master's degree in physical education at the University of Montana, Babey served as an assistant coach for Calgary's Southern Alberta Institute of Technology (SAIT) Trojans hockey team. He began coaching midget ice hockey teams in Saskatoon and Calgary, winning numerous provincial, city and tournament championships. In the fall of 1987, Babey was promoted to head coach for the Trojans hockey team. In his first year as head coach, Babey guided the Trojans to a 5–18–1 record in the Alberta Colleges Athletic Conference (ACAC). During the 1997 Canadian Colleges Athletic Association (CCAA) National Hockey Championship, the Trojans finished the three-team, round-robin portion of the tournament with two wins but lost in the finals against the Cambrian College Golden Shield. The Trojans won their second national title in college history outscoring the Sir Sandford Flemming College Knights 16–2 in the gold medal game of the 2000 CCAA National Hockey Championship. Following the team's gold medal performance, Babey received the Canadian Colleges Athletic Association's Coaching Award of Excellence.

Babey guided the Trojans to ACAC (provincial) championships in 1997, 2000, 2002, 2005, 2007, 2008, 2009, 2010, and 2014 and to the CCAA (national) championship in 2000. On January 22, 2004, Babey surpassed the record for regular-season wins in the Alberta Colleges Athletic Conference with his 246th win. Following this, he was recognized by the Calgary Booster Club as an Honoured Athletic Leader. A few years later, in 2010, he reached 400 wins including 351 regular-season wins. Following his 27th season as head coach of the SAIT Trojans, Babey stepped down as the regular-season and post-season winningest coach in Canadian post-secondary hockey history with 534 wins in 849 games. During his 17 year tenure as athletic director, SAIT teams earned 89 ACAC medals and 18 CCCA medals . In recognition of his accomplishments internationally and provincially, Babey was enshrined into the Alberta Hockey Hall of Fame in 2015.

=== International ===
While serving as head coach of the Trojans, Babey was selected to coach for Hockey Canada at their Canada men's national ice hockey team selection camps from 1990 to 1998. In 1996, former Calgary Flames coach Dave King selected Babey and Wally Kozak to assist him with the selection for the Japanese junior national team. In 2000, Babey was named head coach of the 2000–2001 Canada's men's national under 18 ice hockey team and later served as an assistant coach with the Canada's men's national team at the 2003 Loto Cup in Slovakia.

In 2006, Babey was selected to coach the Denmark men's national junior ice hockey team at the 2007 World Junior Ice Hockey Championships. He was chosen to coach the team again in 2007 after he helped the team earn a spot in the 'A pool' the previous season. Babey guided the Denmark men's national junior ice hockey team at the 2008 World Junior Ice Hockey Championships. (In 2006, he was forced to miss two Trojans games as he was coaching at the IIHF Under-20, Pool B championship during the month of December.)

After he departed from SAIT on his own terms, Babey was named head coach of Canada's national sledge hockey team for the 2014–15 season. In spite of his lack of experience, Babey was praised by captain Greg Westlake who said "he [Babey] put us on the path to success." In his first season as coach, he led the team to a silver medal at the 2015 IPC Ice Sledge Hockey World Championships.

In 2015-16, Babey served as head coach alongside assistant coach Brandon Reid and manager Marshall Starkman. He helped lead Canada's national sledge hockey team to two silver medals; first at the inaugural Ice Sledge Hockey Pan Pacific Championship after losing to team USA and again during the 2016 World Sledge Hockey Challenge.

Babey returned to Canada's national para ice hockey team for the 2016-17 campaign, where he led the team to their first gold medal since 2013 at the 2017 World Para Ice Hockey Championships.

In 2017-18, he coached Canada's national para ice hockey team to silver at the 2018 IPC Paralympic Winter Games in Gangneung, South Korea. The team competed against the United States for their first chance at a gold medal since 2006.
