= 2008 World Sledge Hockey Challenge =

Tournament details
- Host country: Canada
- Venue(s): Charlottetown, PEI
- Teams: 4

Final positions
- Champions: Canada (2nd title)
- Runners-up: Norway
- Third place: United States
- Fourth place: Japan

Tournament statistics
- Games played: 8
- Goals scored: 48 (6 per game)
- Scoring leader(s): (Canada) Greg Westlake, (Canada) Billy Bridges (9 points)

The 2008 World Sledge Hockey Challenge was the second semi-annual international ice sledge hockey tournament organized by Hockey Canada. The event was hosted in Charlottetown, PEI. Japan replaced Germany at this years tournament.

== Round Robin ==
The 4 teams played each other once in the round robin with the top 2 teams playing in the Gold Medal Game and the bottom 2 in the Bronze Medal Game.

| Norway | 8 - 0 | Japan |

| Canada | 3 - 1 | United States |

| Japan | 1 - 4 | United States |

| Canada | 2 - 0 | Norway |

| Norway | 3 - 2 | United States |

| Canada | 7 - 1 | Japan |

=== Round Robin Standings ===
| Team | Pld | W | OTW | OTL | L | GF | GA | GD | Pts |
|---|---|---|---|---|---|---|---|---|---|
| Canada | 3 | 3 | 0 | 0 | 0 | 12 | 2 | +10 | 9 |
| Norway | 3 | 2 | 0 | 0 | 1 | 11 | 4 | +7 | 6 |
| United States | 3 | 1 | 0 | 0 | 2 | 7 | 7 | 0 | 3 |
| Japan | 3 | 0 | 0 | 0 | 3 | 2 | 19 | −17 | 0 |

source:Para Hockey Cup Guide and Record Book

=== Playoffs ===
==== Bronze-medal game ====
| Japan | 0 - 9 | United States |

==== Gold-medal game ====
| Norway | 0 - 7 | Canada |

=== Final standings ===
| | Team |
|---|---|
| 1st place, gold medalist(s) | Canada |
| 2nd place, silver medalist(s) | Norway |
| 3rd place, bronze medalist(s) | United States |
| 4th | Japan |
