= Zeitgeist (Schiller album) =

Studio album by Schiller
- Released: 19 August 1999
- Recorded: 1998–1999
- Genre: Trance, ambient
- Length: 60:58
- Label: Universal / Sleepingroom
- Producer: Christopher von Deylen, Mirko von Schlieffen

Schiller chronology
Zeitgeist (1999)	Weltreise (2001)

Singles from Zeitgeist
- 1. "Das Glockenspiel (UK: The Bell)" Released: 31 December 1998; 2. "Liebesschmerz (UK: Love's Pain)" Released: 2 July 1999; 3. "Ruhe (UK: Peace)" Released: 29 November 1999

Zeitgeist ("Spirit of the Age") is the debut album by German electronic DJ Schiller. It features the singles "Das Glockenspiel", "Liebesschmerz" and "Ruhe", all of which reached the top 30 of the German singles charts. The album itself reached the top 30 of the German longplay charts as well.

== Track listing ==
All tracks by Von Deylen and Von Schlieffen

No.	Title	English translation	Length
1.	"Der Anfang"	The Beginning	1:32
2.	"Glück und Erfüllung"	Joy and Happiness	5:15
3.	"Liebesschmerz"	Pain of Love	4:11
4.	"Das Unbekannte Reich"	The Unknown Realm	6:04
5.	"Das Glockenspiel"	The Bell	3:52
6.	"Körperbewegung"	Body Movements	6:13
7.	"Freiheit"	Freedom	5:51
8.	"Ruhe"	Quiet	6:11
9.	"Sonnenuntergang"	Sunset	6:46
10.	"Liebesparade"	Love Parade	4:26
11.	"Zeitgeist"	Spirit of the Age	6:27
12.	"Das Ende"	The End	4:03
