= Maggie Behle =

American para-alpine skier (born 1980)

Personal information
- Nationality: American
- Born: 1980 (age 45–46)
- Website: www.disabled4you.com/DOWNLOADS/FILES/HTML/MAGGIEBE.HTM

Sport
- Country: United States
- Sport: alpine skiing
Medal record
Representing United States
Women's Alpine skiing
Winter Paralympics
Bronze medal – third place	Nagona 1998	downhill
Bronze medal – third place	Nagona 1998	slalom

Maggie Behle (born 1980) is an American Paralympic female alpine skier.

She was born without a right leg and started to engage with alpine skiing at the age of five. She became one of the members of the U.S. Disabled Ski Team at the age of 13.

== Career ==
Behle competed at the 1996 World Championship in Lech, Austria winning two silver metals as well as competing at the 1997 World Cup in Pra Loup, France, winning a gold metal in slalom. Behle competed at the 1998 Winter Paralympics at the age of 17, which is also her only appearance in a Winter Paralympic event and competed in the alpine skiing event claiming bronze medals in the women's slalom and downhill categories. After claiming bronze medals at the 1998 Winter Paralympics, she was honoured at the Rowland Hall-St. Mark's School where she was educated.
