= Marilyn Winder =

Canadian para-alpine skier

Sport
- Country: Canada
- Sport: Para-alpine skiing
Medal record
Paralympic Games
Silver medal – second place	1998 Nagano	Super-G B1,3
Bronze medal – third place	1998 Nagano	Giant Slalom B1,3
Bronze medal – third place	1998 Nagano	Slalom B1,3

Marilyn Winder is a Canadian para-alpine skier. She represented Canada at the 1998 Winter Paralympics, where she won three medals: one silver medal and two bronze medals. She won the silver medal in the Women's Super-G B1,3 event and the bronze medals in the Women's Giant Slalom B1,3 and the Women's Slalom B1,3 events.

== See also ==
- List of Paralympic medalists in alpine skiing
