= Sylvester Flis =

Polish and American ice sledge hockey player (born 1974)

Personal information
- Nationality: Poland/United States
- Born: June 20, 1974 (age 52) Stalowa Wola, Poland
Medal record
Para ice hockey
Representing United States
Paralympic Games
Gold medal – first place	2002 Salt Lake City	Men's sledge hockey

Sylvester Flis (born June 20, 1974) is a Polish-American former ice sledge hockey player. He won a gold medal with Team USA at the 2002 Winter Paralympics. He became an American citizen in 2001.

== Early life ==
Sylvester Flis was born on June 20, 1974, in Stalowa Wola. Shortly after birth, he was diagnosed with meningocele. In 1994, he moved with his family to Chicago, United States.

In December 1995, he discovered sledge hockey, and a year later he made the U.S. national team. Due to his lack of citizenship, Sylvester did not travel to the 1998 Winter Paralympic Games in Nagano. In 1999, he founded the RIC Blackhawks club team at the Rehabilitation Institute of Chicago, the largest rehabilitation hospital in the U.S. The newly founded team’s successes began with its first trip to a tournament.

In 2001, he became a U.S. citizen, which allowed him to compete at the 2002 Winter Paralympics in Salt Lake City representing the U.S., winning a gold medal. As the Paralympic top scorer (11 goals, 7 assists), he is named the tournament's Most Valuable Player. Sylvester also enters the Guinness Book of World Records in two categories: for the most goals scored (7) in a single Paralympic event and for the most points (18). Following his Paralympic success, Flis moved to Anchorage, Alaska, to build a team of disabled hockey players there in collaboration with the charity Challenge Alaska.

== Return to Poland ==
In 2006, Flis returned to Poland, to Elbląg, to form a hockey team with the IKS “Atak” club, made up of sitting volleyball players. The main goal of establishing this new division was to compete in the 2010 Winter Olympics in Vancouver. The team lost by one goal to Estonia during the 2009 IPC Ice Sledge Hockey World Championships in Eindhoven, which prevented them from advancing to the 2009 IPC Ice Sledge Hockey Paralympic Qualifier.

Flis decided to pursue an individual path to compete in the Winter Paralympics for a second time, but this time representing Poland in cross-country skiing. In June 2009 he began training and in December in Sjusjøen, at the 10km World Cup, Flis met the qualifying standard and earned his Paralympic qualification for Vancouver. In 2010, he competed again at the Paralympic Games in Vancouver, representing Poland in skiing.
