= Ruhe (song) =

Single by Schiller

from the album Zeitgeist
- Released: 29 November 1999
- Genre: Electronica
- Label: Zeitgeist (Universal Music)
- Songwriter(s): Christopher von Deylen, Mirko von Schlieffen
- Producer(s): Christopher von Deylen, Mirko von Schlieffen

Schiller singles chronology
"Liebesschmerz" (1999)	"Ruhe" (1999)	"Ein schöner Tag" (2000)

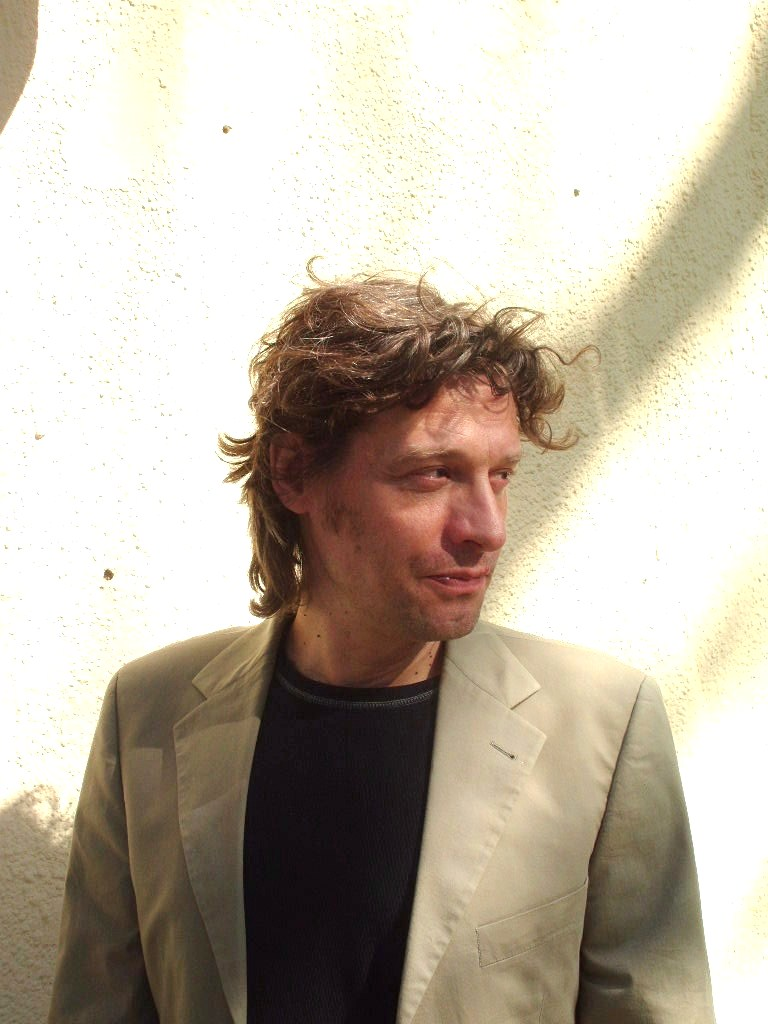
Benjamin Völz

Ruhe (English: Silence or peace) is the third single from the 1999 Schiller debut album Zeitgeist with vocals by an unknown woman and an unknown man and spoken word passages by German actor and voice actor Benjamin Völz (born 13 May 1960), who became famous in the German-speaking countries as the voice of FBI Special Agent Fox Mulder from the American television series The X-Files. The song is titled internationally as "Peace". The trance music single was officially released on 29 November 1999 in Germany and was peaking at number 24 on German Singles Chart in 1999 and at number 69 in Switzerland. The cover art work shows a graphic of an empty box.

The album version (Langspiel-Fassung) and the single and TV version (Fernseh-Fassung) of Ruhe are unlike versions with completely different music. Only the spoken words are the same. The spoken words of the song are including the poem "Über die Einsamkeit" by Swiss philosophical writer Johann Georg Zimmermann (1728-1795). The poem is:

Ruhe, das höchste Glück auf Erden, kommt sehr oft nur durch Einsamkeit in das Herz.

Translation from German: "Peacefulness, the greatest happiness on earth, comes very often only through solitude into the heart."

Ruhe was featured in the 2009 German cinema movie Zweiohrküken and was included on the Official Sound Track of Zweiohrküken.

== Track listing ==
=== Maxi single ===
No.	Title	Length
1.	"Ruhe (Fernseh-Fassung)"	3:33
2.	"Ruhe (Chill-Out-Fassung)"	3:40
3.	"Ruhe (Langspiel-Fassung)"	5:51
4.	"Ruhe (Humate Remix)"	9:57
5.	"Ruhe (Ayla Mix)"	7:13

=== Vinyl ===
No.	Title	Length
1.	"Ruhe (Langspiel-Fassung)"	5:51
2.	"Ruhe (Free Schiller Mix)"	8:40
3.	"Ruhe (Humate Mix)"	9:57

== Credits and personnel ==
- Composed and produced by Christopher von Deylen and Mirko von Schlieffen
- Bass and rhythm guitar by Tissy Thiers
- Voice by Benjamin Völz
- Recorded and mixed at the Sleepingroom in Hamburg
- Voice recorded by Stefan Knauthe at the Kokon Studio in Berlin

== Music video ==
The official music video for "Ruhe" has a length of 3:45 minutes. The video features three couples with people of different ethnic origin, who are walking and strolling through an inner courtyard of an office building in the style of a Japanese garden. The video was aired and was shown for example on German music television channel VIVA in 1999.

== Charts ==
Chart (1999)	Peak position
Germany (Media Control AG)	24
Switzerland	69
