= Mark Ludbrook =

Canadian Paralympic athlete (born 1967)

- Mark Ludbrook at the 2002 Winter Paralympics

Personal information
- Nationality: Canadian, Australian
- Born: 19 January 1967 (age 59) Port Colborne, Ontario, Canada

Sport
- Sport: Alpine Skiing; Swimming
Medal record
Representing Canada
Paralympic Games
Alpine skiing
Bronze medal – third place	1998 Nagano	Super-G LW4
Swimming
Bronze medal – third place	1984 New York / Stoke Mandeville	100 m Freestyle A4
Bronze medal – third place	1984 New York / Stoke Mandeville	4x100 m Freestyle Relay A1-A9
Silver medal – second place	1984 New York / Stoke Mandeville	4x100 m Medley Relay A1-A9

Mark Ludbrook (born 19 January 1967) is a Canadian former Paralympic athlete who competed for Canada across five Paralympic Games in two sports. A below-knee amputee, he swam at the 1984, 1988 and 1992 Summer Paralympics and competed in alpine skiing at the 1998 and 2002 Winter Paralympics, making him one of a small number of Canadians to have competed at both the Summer and Winter Paralympic Games. He is a four-time Paralympic medallist, having won three medals across the three Summer Paralympics in swimming and a bronze in the men's Super-G LW4 in alpine skiing at the 1998 Games. At the 2002 Winter Paralympics in Salt Lake City, he was Canada's flag bearer at the opening ceremony.

Ludbrook competed at three Summer Paralympics, winning three medals and setting three Canadian records in disabled freestyle swimming. He made his debut at the 1984 Games (Stoke Mandeville and New York), winning bronze in the men's 100 m freestyle A4, and also competed at Seoul 1988 and Barcelona 1992 in the S10 classification. Ludbrook transitioned to alpine skiing in the LW4 classification. At Nagano 1998 he won bronze in the Super-G and also skied slalom, giant slalom and downhill. At Salt Lake City 2002, competing in his fifth Paralympic Games, he took part in all four alpine disciplines and served as Canada's flag bearer at the opening ceremony.

In 2002, Ludbrook was one of the subjects of Ski Bums, a National Film Board of Canada documentary directed by Academy Award–winning filmmaker John Zaritsky, profiling skiers living in Whistler, British Columbia.
