= Matt Coppens =

American ice sledge hockey player

Personal information
- Nationality: United States
- Born: April 18, 1971 (age 55) Evergreen Park, Illinois, United States
Medal record
Paralympic Games
Gold medal – first place	2002 Salt Lake City	Men's sledge hockey

Matt Coppens (born April 18, 1971) is an American former ice sledge hockey player. He won a gold medal with Team USA at the 2002 Winter Paralympics.
