= Jean Labonté =

Canadian ice sledge hockey player

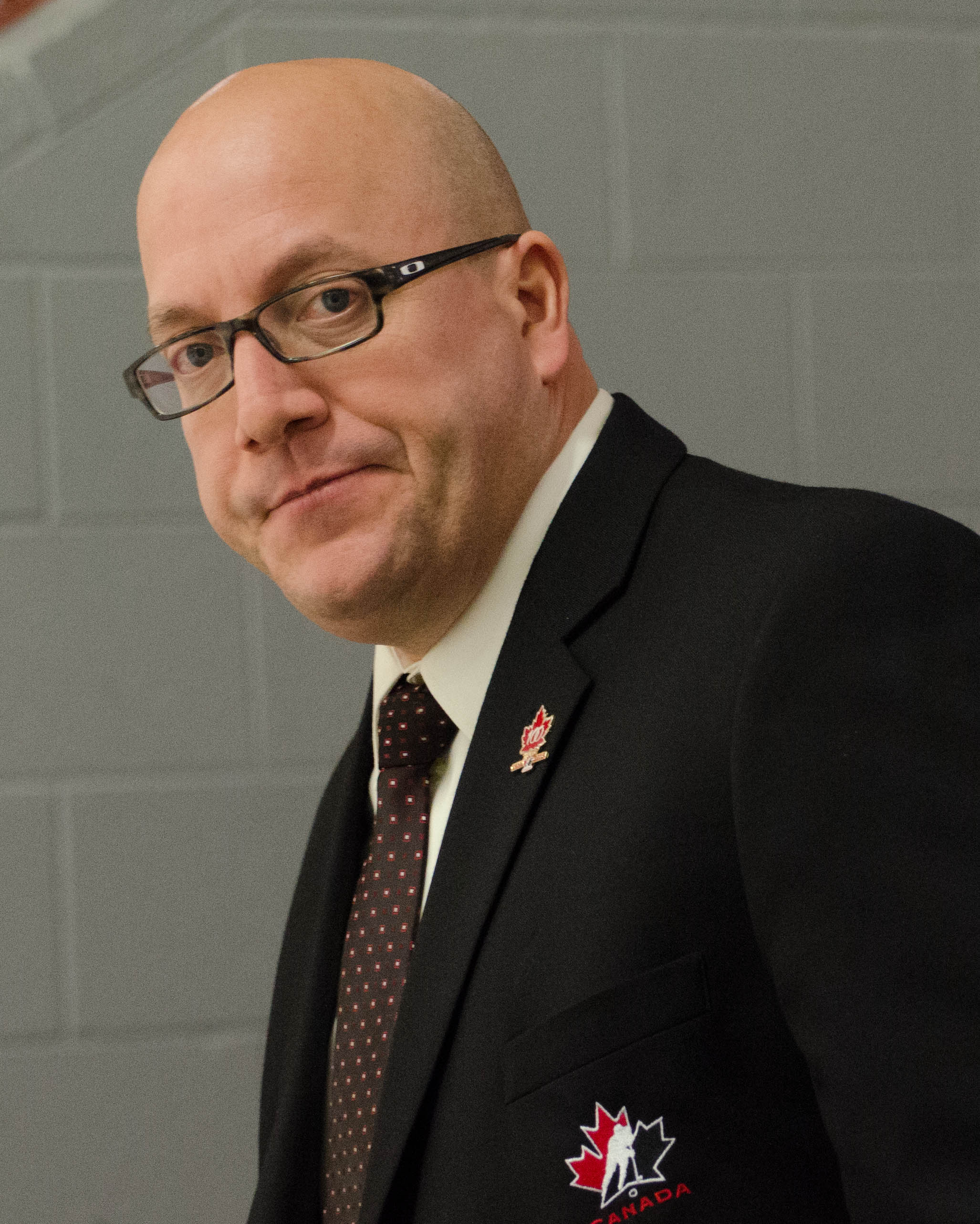
- Labonte in 2015
- Born: March 20, 1969 (age 57) Hull, Quebec, Canada
- Height: 5 ft 11 in (180 cm)
- Weight: 195 lb (88 kg; 13 st 13 lb)
- Position: Defence
- National team: Canada
- Playing career: 1996–2010
Medal record
Men's para ice hockey
Representing Canada
Paralympic Games
Silver medal – second place	1998 Nagano	Team
Gold medal – first place	2006 Turin	Team
World Championships
Bronze medal – third place	1996 Nynäshamn	Team
Gold medal – first place	2000 Salt Lake City	Team
Gold medal – first place	2008 Marlborough	Team
Bronze medal – third place	2009 Ostrava	Team

Jean Labonté (born March 20, 1969) is a Canadian ice sledge hockey player.

Labonté was diagnosed with osteosarcoma in his left tibia in 1986 at the age of 17 and finally lost his leg at the age of 20, in 1990. After his amputation, Labonté turned his sights towards ice sledge hockey and made the Canadian National Sledge hockey team for the first time in 1996. He was on the Canadian team that won the 2006 sledge hockey gold medal at the 2006 Winter Paralympics in Turin. He was the captain of the Canadian Team from the 2007–08 season until his retirement after the 2009–2010 season. He studied at l'Université du Québec en Outaouais and currently works at Alcatel-Lucent as a software designer.

== International career ==
Labonté was named on the Canadian men's national ice sledge hockey team for the first time in 1996, at the age of 26. His first international tournament was the 1996 IPC World Championships held in Nynäshamn, Sweden. Labonté was team Canada's captain from the 2007–08 season until his retirement after the 2009–10 season.

Labonté was the flag bearer for Canada at the 2010 Paralympic Games in Vancouver.

== Career statistics ==
=== International ===
Year	Team	Comp	GP	G	A	Pts	PIM
1996	Canada	ISHWC	-	-	-	-	-
1998	Canada	PARA	5	0	1	1	4
2000	Canada	ISHWC	6	1	2	3	4
2002	Canada	PARA	6	2	2	4	6
2004	Canada	ISHWC	5	0	0	0	0
2006	Canada	PARA	5	1	1	2	4
2008	Canada	ISHWC	6	1	2	3	6
2009	Canada	ISHWC	5	1	3	4	0
2010	Canada	PARA	5	1	2	3	2
TOTALS		ISHWC	22	3	7	10	10
TOTALS		PARA	21	4	6	10	16
