= Jack Sanders (sledge hockey) =

American ice sledge hockey player

Personal information
- Nationality: United States
- Born: October 9, 1958 (age 67) Galesburg, Illinois, United States
Medal record
Paralympic Games
Gold medal – first place	2002 Salt Lake City	Men's sledge hockey

Jack Sanders (born October 9, 1958) is an American former ice sledge hockey player. He won a gold medal with Team USA as a defenseman at the 2002 Winter Paralympics. Currently, he is a player/coach for Central Illinois Thunder.
