= Patrick Byrne (sledge hockey) =

American ice sledge hockey player

Personal information
- Nationality: United States
- Born: April 11, 1965 (age 61) Chicago, Illinois, United States
Medal record
Paralympic Games
Gold medal – first place	2002 Salt Lake City	Men's sledge hockey

Patrick Byrne (born April 11, 1965) is an American former ice sledge hockey player. He won a gold medal with Team USA at the 2002 Winter Paralympics. He is a member of the Illinois Hockey Hall of Fame.
