= Das Glockenspiel =

1999 single by Schiller

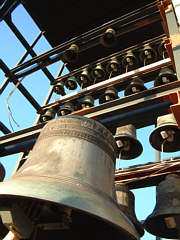
A carillon in Germany, called in German "Glockenspiel"

"Das Glockenspiel" is the debut single by Schiller from their 1999 debut album, Zeitgeist. It was subtitled internationally with the title "The Bell". The single was officially released on 31 December 1998 in Germany and peaked at number 21 on the German singles chart and number 17 on the UK Singles Chart in 1999. The cover artwork shows a graphic of a bell. The music video was shot in the United States.

The single became famous for featuring a bell-like melody. The song's name is inspired by the poem "Das Lied von der Glocke" ("Song of the Bell") by Friedrich Schiller from 1799. Christopher von Deylen, one of the producers of Schiller, had just read "Die Glocke" by Friedrich Schiller before the song was released. The band's name was also inspired by Friedrich Schiller.

== Music video ==
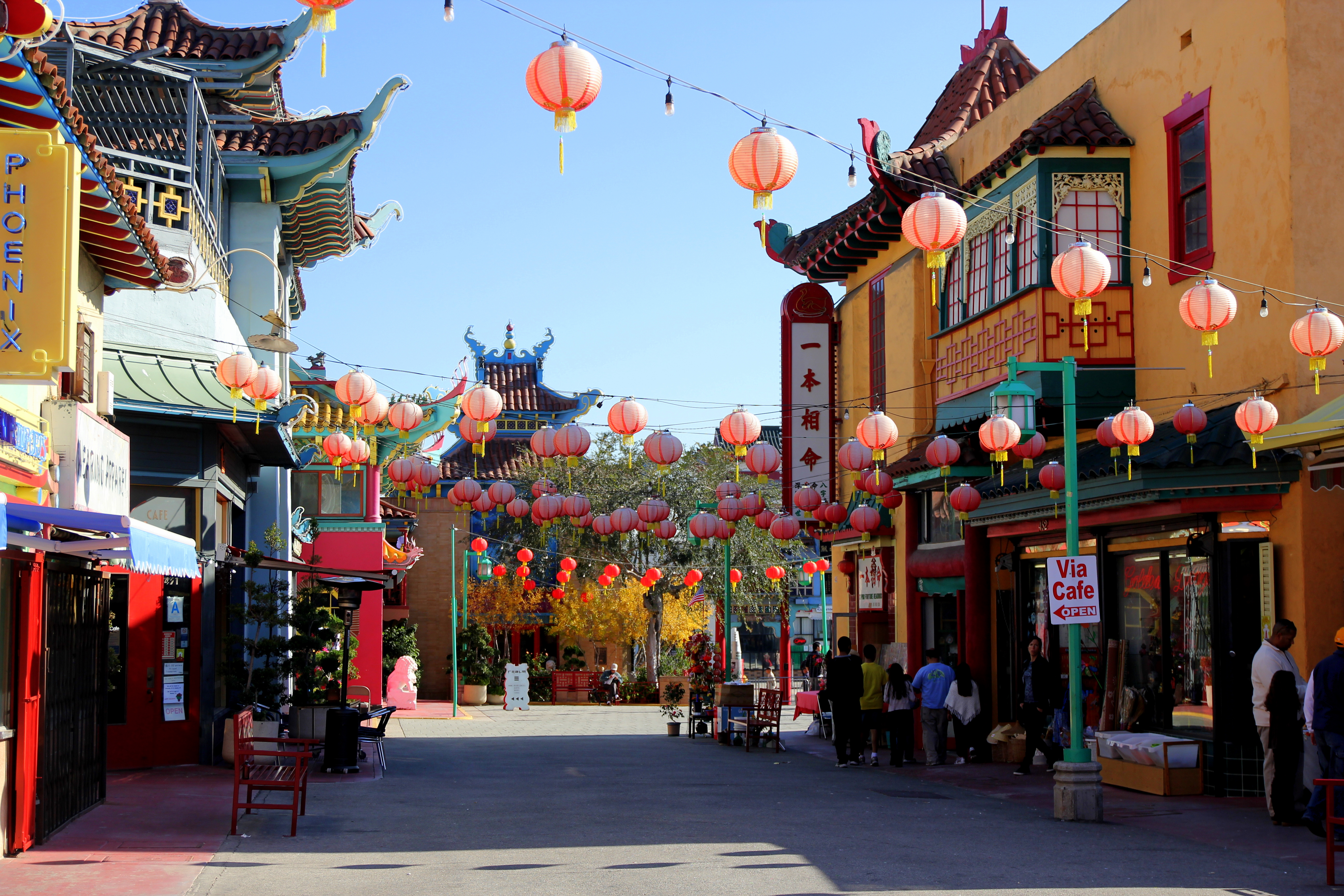
Chinatown in Los Angeles

The official music video for "Das Glockenspiel" was shot in Chinatown in Los Angeles, California, United States by German director Marcus Sternberg. It has a length of 3:11 minutes. The video features a few dancers, four older Asian persons, who are playing a Mahjong game, and a woman in a traditional Asian festival costume. It shows also a ringing bell. Upon airing, it became one of the most played music videos on German music television channel VIVA in 1999.

== Charts ==
Chart (1999)	Peak position
Germany (Media Control AG)	21
Switzerland	38
UK	17

== Track listings ==
Maxi single

No.	Title	Length
1.	"Das Glockenspiel (airplay edit)"	3:47
2.	"Das Glockenspiel (video edit)"	3:10
3.	"Das Glockenspiel (X/Tended)"	7:33
4.	"Das Glockenspiel (Gary D. remix)"	8:09
5.	"Das Glockenspiel (Mike Scandle remix)"	7:56
6.	"Das Glockenspiel (Free Schiller mix)"	7:39

Vinyl

No.	Title	Length
1.	"Das Glockenspiel (X/tended)"	7:33
2.	"Das Glockenspiel (Free Schiller mix)"	7:39
3.	"Das Glockenspiel (video edit)"	3:10

== Credits and personnel ==
- Written and produced by Christopher von Deylen and Mirko von Schlieffen
- Recorded and mixed at the Homebase Studio in Hamburg
- Artwork by Katja Stier
- Artwork in Scandinavia by TommyBoy @ Netpointers

== See also ==
- Glockenspiel, a musical instrument
