= National Sports Center for the Disabled =

U.S. non-profit organization

The National Sports Center for the Disabled
- Abbreviation: NSCD
- Formation: 1970
- Purpose: Enabling the human spirit through therapeutic sports and recreation.
- Headquarters: Winter Park, Colorado; Denver, Colorado
- Region served: United States
- President and CEO: Julie Taulman
- Affiliations: United States Olympic Committee Paralympic Sport Club
- Volunteers: More than 1,300
- Website: nscd.org
- Remarks: Each year, more than 3,000 individuals with disabilities participate in the NSCD's programs to learn more about sports and themselves.

The National Sports Center for the Disabled (NSCD) is a 501(c)(3) non-profit organization that began in 1970 providing ski lessons for children with amputations. Today, the NSCD is one of the largest therapeutic recreation organizations in the world, serving more than 3,000 children and adults with disabilities. The NSCD is based out of Winter Park Resort in Winter Park, Colorado, and NSCD Front Range Adaptive Program Center located at the Jefferson County Fairgrounds in Golden, Colorado.

== History ==
The NSCD was founded in 1970 by Hal O'Leary, who was then a salaried ski instructor at Winter Park Resort. O'Leary taught one lesson to 23 children with amputations, which spearheaded the National Sports Center for the Disabled. For the first three years of the program, O'Leary operated out of a broom closet at Winter Park Resort. Since then, he has been named one of the "best 100 things to happen to skiing" by Ski Magazine. has established programs for disabled athletes on four continents and coached two Paralympic teams. O'Leary was also awarded the prestigious honor of Order of Canada, Canada's highest honor of merit given to individuals recognized for lifetime achievement. Today, the NSCD facilitates a variety of both winter and summer programs, including alpine skiing, snowboarding, Nordic skiing, snowshoeing, rock climbing, kayaking, Sports Ability Clinics and therapeutic horseback riding. The NSCD offers recreational opportunities as well as competitive ski race training through a renowned Competition Center. The NSCD is proud to be recognized as a Paralympic Sport Club through the U.S. Paralympic Sport Club Network.

== Mission ==
The stated mission of the NSCD: "The National Sports Center for the Disabled enables the human spirit through therapeutic sports and recreation."

== Competition Center ==
The Competition Center is a program designed for beginner through elite-level racers. Edging, balance drills, speed progression and gate training are all emphasized for Alpine Skiing, Cross-Country Skiing and Snowboarding competitions. The Competition Center is a smaller faction of the NSCD but provides substantial name recognition and reputation growth due to the caliber of athletes that train there, in the 2010 Winter Paralympics, the NSCD athletes accounted for more than half of the total alpine medals collected by Team USA.

=== Steven J. Ricci Award ===
Steven J. Ricci (1968–1999) was an NSCD athlete who died following critical head injuries during a training run at Winter Park Resort. This award was created to award athletes who exemplify team leadership and sportsmanship.

| Year | Recipient |
|---|---|
| 2000 | Sandy Dukat |
| 2001 | Bruce Warner |
| 2002 | Ronny Persson |
| 2003 | Ian Jansing |
| 2004 | Brad Washburn |
| 2005 | Danny Pufpaff |
| 2006 | Allison Jones |
| 2007 | Adam Hall |
| 2008 | Stephen Peters |
| 2009 | James Church |
| 2010 | Luba Lowery |
| 2011 | Danelle Umstead |
| 2012 | Jill Wilkinson |
| 2013 | Sarah Holm |

=== 2012/13 Competition Program Accomplishments (Alpine) ===
Copper DSUSA NOR AM Dec 2012 2SG 2GS 2SL

- 35 medals out of 108 possible awarded to NSCD athletes

Winter Park NOR AM Jan 2013 1 SG 1GS 1SL

- 25 out of 54 possible medals awarded to NSCD athletes

Kimberley, Can NOR AM Jan 2013 2DH 2SG

- 17 out of 64 possible medals awarded to NSCD athletes

US Nationals

- 22 out of 54 possible medals awarded to NSCD athletes
- 11 out of 18 National Champions titled to NSCD athletes
- Retained Cup for 2nd year

World Cup Highlights

- Allison Jones - 1 Gold, 3 Silver, 2 Bronze
- Alana Nichols - 1 Silver, 3 Bronze
- Danelle and Rob Umstead - 1 Gold

World Championship Highlights

- Stephen Lawler - Silver DH
- Adam Hall - Bronze SL

=== 2012/13 Competition Program Accomplishments (Snowboard) ===
World Cup Highlights

- Mike Shea - Gold

Copper NOR AM

- Mike Shea - Gold

Sochi Test Event

- Mike Shea - Silver

=== 2012/13 Competition Program Accomplishments (Nordic/Biathlon) ===
World Cup Highlights

- Dan Cnossesn - 2 Silver, 2 Bronze
- 3 top 10 international finishes

US Nationals

- Dan Cnossen - 2x National Champion
- Beth Requist - 2x National Champion

== Organizational Leadership ==
The Leadership Team of the NSCD is composed of six members of the organization: President/CEO, Finance & Human Resources Director, Operations and Communications Director, Development & Marketing Director, Competition Center Director and Recreational Program Director. There are 12 community members that sit on the board of trustees.

== See also ==
- Professional Association of Therapeutic Horsemanship
- United States Ski and Snowboard Association
