= Para Hockey Cup =

Annual hockey tournament in the Canada

- Current season, competition or edition: 2024 Para Hockey Cup
- Sport: Sledge hockey
- First season: 2007
- Most recent champion: United States
- Most titles: United States (11)
- Broadcaster: TSN
- Sponsors: Hockey Canada; World Para Ice Hockey
- Related competitions: World Para Ice Hockey Championships; Paralympics; International Para Hockey Cup

The Para Hockey Cup, formerly the World Sledge Hockey Challenge (WSHC) and Canadian Tire Para Ice Hockey Cup is an annual international Para ice hockey tournament sponsored by Hockey Canada and the World Para Ice Hockey. The tournament is an invitational format to bring four of the strongest Para ice hockey teams together for international competition.

The tournament features four teams per year and has seen teams from Canada, the United States, Norway, Germany, Japan, Russia, South Korea, Italy, the Czech Republic and China.

== History ==
The tournament was created in 2007 by Hockey Canada. The idea behind the tournament was to give an opportunity for international level play during non-Paralympic years.

The inaugural World Sledge Hockey Challenge tournament in 2007 was hosted in Kelowna, British Columbia, and featured four teams – Canada, Norway, United States and Germany. Canada captured the inaugural tournament, by defeating Norway 1-0 in overtime in the gold medal game.

The 2008 tournament was held in Charlottetown, Prince Edward Island. Japan replaced Germany. For the second straight year, Canada defeated Norway in the final. However, Canada dominated the final winning 7-0

In 2009, the United States won their first title. They defeated Canada in overtime 3-2 in Charlottetown, Prince Edward Island. No tournament was held in 2010, owing to the 2010 Winter Paralympics held in Vancouver, British Columbia that year. Instead, two tournaments were held in 2011, in April in London, Ontario, Canada defeated Norway in the final 8-0. In the November tournament that year in Calgary, Alberta, Canada again captured Gold, defeating the United States 4-1 in the final. The 2012 tournament was held again in Calgary, Alberta and saw the United States capture their second gold, defeating Canada 1-0 in the final.

In 2013, the tournament was hosted in Toronto and saw the lineup change for the first time in 5 years. Russia and South Korea were introduced and replaced Japan and Norway in the tournament. Russia would be hosting the upcoming 2014 Winter Paralympics and South Korea added in an attempt to help them gain experience before they hosted the 2018 Winter Paralympics. Canada captured gold, by defeating the United States 4-1 in the final.

At the December 2016 tournament, Norway returned for one year, replacing Russia. In 2017, Italy made their tournament debut, replacing Norway.

In 2018, the World Sledge Hockey Challenge was rebranded as the Para Hockey Cup. Sponsored by Canadian Tire, the tournament was officially known as the Canadian Tire Para Ice Hockey Cup. The tournament would be played with only the three para hockey medallists from the 2018 Paralympics earlier in the year.

In 2019, the Czech Republic made their tournament debut replacing South Korea. Russia also returned for a year. The 2020 and 2021 were cancelled due to the COVID-19 pandemic. The tournament returned in 2022 with Italy replacing Russia. In 2023, China made their tournament debut replacing Italy.

== Champions ==
Season	Edition	1st place, gold medalist(s)	2nd place, silver medalist(s)	3rd place, bronze medalist(s)	Fourth	Host city
2006-07	2007	Canada	Norway	United States	Germany	Kelowna, British Columbia
2007-08	2008	Canada	Norway	United States	Japan	Charlottetown, Prince Edward Island
2008-09	2009	United States	Canada	Norway	Japan	Charlottetown, Prince Edward Island
2009-10	2010	Not held due to 2010 Winter Paralympics in Vancouver, Canada
2010-11	2011; April	Canada	Norway	United States	Japan	London, Ontario
2011-12	2011 November	Canada	United States	Norway	Japan	Calgary, Alberta
2012-13	2012	United States	Canada	Norway	Japan	Calgary, Alberta
2013-14	2013	Canada	United States	Russia	South Korea	Toronto, Ontario
2014-15	2015	United States	Russia	Canada	South Korea	Leduc, Alberta
2015-16	2016 January	United States	Canada	South Korea	Russia	Bridgewater, Nova Scotia
2016-17	2016 December	United States	Canada	Norway	South Korea	Charlottetown, Prince Edward Island
2017-18	2017	United States	Canada	South Korea	Italy	Charlottetown, Prince Edward Island
2018-19	2018	United States	Canada	South Korea		London, Ontario
2019-20	2019	United States	Canada	Russia	Czech Republic	Paradise, Newfoundland & Labrador
2020-21	2020	Tournament cancelled due to COVID-19 pandemic.				Bridgewater, Nova Scotia
2021-22	2021	Tournament cancelled due to COVID-19 pandemic.				Bridgewater, Nova Scotia
2022-23	2022	United States	Canada	Czech Republic	Italy	Bridgewater, Nova Scotia
2023-24	2023	United States	Canada	Czech Republic	China	Quispamsis, New Brunswick
2024-25	2024	United States	Canada	China	Czech Republic	Charlottetown, Prince Edward Island

== Medal table ==
Country	(gold) Gold	(silver) Silver	(bronze) Bronze	Medals
United States	11	2	3	16
Canada	5	10	1	16
Norway	0	3	4	7
Russia	0	1	2	3
South Korea	0	0	3	3
Czech Republic	0	0	2	2
China	0	0	1	1
Japan	0	0	0	0
Italy	0	0	0	0
Germany	0	0	0	0

== All-time team records ==
Up to date as of December 2023

Rank	Team	GP	W	L	OTL	GF	GA	+/-
1	United States	67	54	12	1	306	91	+ 215
2	Canada	67	50	12	5	311	88	+ 223
3	Norway	32	13	17	2	73	115	42
4	Russia	20	8	11	1	55	43	12
5	South Korea	29	3	26	0	31	174	143
6	Czech Republic	10	2	8	0	12	61	49
7	Japan	23	1	21	1	22	157	135
8	Italy	10	0	9	1	10	72	62
9	Germany	4	0	4	0	5	24	19

== See also ==
- Para ice hockey at the Winter Paralympics
- International Paralympic Committee
- World Para Ice Hockey Championships
- Sledge hockey
