= James Dunham (sledge hockey) =

American ice sledge hockey player

Personal information
- Nationality: United States
- Born: November 22, 1963 (age 62) Kansas City, Missouri, United States
Medal record
Paralympic Games
| Gold medal – first place | 2002 Salt Lake City | Men's sledge hockey |

James Dunham (born November 22, 1963) is an American former ice sledge hockey player. He won a gold medal with the USA team at the 2002 Winter Paralympics.
