= Pat Sapp =

American ice sledge hockey player

Personal information
- Nationality: United States
- Born: April 12, 1953 (age 73) Columbus, Ohio, United States
Medal record
Paralympic Games
Gold medal – first place	2002 Salt Lake City	Men's sledge hockey

Pat Sapp (born April 12, 1953) is an American former ice sledge hockey player. He won a gold medal with Team USA at the 2002 Winter Paralympics.
