= Jan Edbom =

Swedish ice sledge hockey player

Personal information
- Nationality: Sweden
- Born: 24 January 1957 (age 69)
Medal record
Paralympic Games
Gold medal – first place	1994 Lillehammer	Men's sledge hockey
Bronze medal – third place	1998 Nagano	Men's sledge hockey

Jan Edbom (born 24 June 1957) is a Swedish former ice sledge hockey player. He won medals for Sweden at the 1994 Winter Paralympics and 1998 Winter Paralympics.
