= Brian Ruhe =

American sledge hockey player

Brian L. Ruhe
Personal information
- Nationality: United States
- Born: September 6, 1974 (age 51) Greenville, Ohio, United States
- Height: 6 ft 3 in (189 cm)
- Weight: 170 lb (77.1 kg)
Medal record
Paralympic Games
Gold medal – first place	2002 Salt Lake City	Men's sledge hockey

Brian L. Ruhe (born September 6, 1974) is an American former ice sledge hockey player. He won a gold medal with Team USA at the 2002 Winter Paralympics. Brian was selected to the All Star Team B for his defensive performance in the tournament.

== Life ==
Brian L Ruhe was born in Greenville, Ohio to Fredrick and Belinda Ruhe. He graduated Greenville Senior High School in 1992 and then attended the University of Cincinnati in the Aerospace Engineering program. During the winter semester of his freshman year, Brian was in a motor vehicle accident.

== Athletic career ==
Ruhe began playing ice sledge hockey in 2000. Brian was recruited by Sylvester Flis while he was working out at the Rehabilitation Institute of Chicago's (RIC) gym. Brian joined the next practice session and joined the RIC-Chicago Blackhawks. He became the starting defenseman and played with the team until 2006.

== Music ==
Brian L Ruhe is a bass player. He played in several cover bands in Chicago, until he met Pablo Mena and Wendi Freeman and formed Daemon Familiar.
