= Stacy Kohut =

Canadian para-alpine skier (born 1970)

Personal information
- Full name: Stacy William Kohut
- Born: 15 October 1970 (age 55) Calgary, Alberta, Canada

Sport
- Sport: Alpine Skiing, Fourcross
Medal record
Representing Canada
Paralympic Games
Alpine Skiing
Gold medal – first place	1994 Lillehammer	Men's Super-G LWXII
Silver medal – second place	1998 Nagano	Men's Giant Slalom LW11
Silver medal – second place	1998 Nagano	Men's Super-G LW11
Silver medal – second place	1998 Nagano	Men's Giant Slalom LW11

Stacy William Kohut (born October 15, 1970) is a Canadian Paralympic skier. He has a gold and three silver medals.

== Bibliography ==
- Scott Hart (2016-12-13). "Mountain biking on 4 wheels is faster than 2". redbull.com. "Meet a rare breed of devoted racer: Stacy Kohut, the world's fastest mountain biker on four wheels."
