= Dean Delaurier =

Canadian ice sledge hockey player

Dean Emmett Delaurier
Personal information
- Nationality: Canada
- Born: March 10, 1954 (age 72) Iroquois Falls, ON
Medal record
Paralympic Games
Silver medal – second place	1998 Nagano	Men's sledge hockey

Dean Emmett Delaurier is a Canadian former ice sledge hockey player (goal tender). He won a silver medal with Team Canada at the 1998 Winter Paralympics. He was also a goal tender for Team Canada in 1996 in Nynäshamn, Sweden where Team Canada won the Bronze medal in the first ever IPC Ice Sledge Hockey World Championships now known as The World Para Ice Hockey Championships.
