= Kuniko Obinata =

Japanese para-alpine skier (born 1972)

Medal record

Women's para alpine skiing

Representing Japan

Paralympic Games
Gold medal – first place	1998 Nagano	Downhill LW10-11
Gold medal – first place	2006 Turin	Giant slalom sitting
Silver medal – second place	1998 Nagano	Super-G LW10-11
Silver medal – second place	2006 Turin	Downhill sitting
Silver medal – second place	2006 Turin	Super-G sitting
Bronze medal – third place	1998 Nagano	Giant slalom LW10-11
Bronze medal – third place	2002 Salt Lake City	Giant slalom LW12
Bronze medal – third place	2002 Salt Lake City	Slalom LW10-12
Bronze medal – third place	2010 Vancouver	Slalom sitting
Bronze medal – third place	2010 Vancouver	Giant slalom sitting

Kuniko Obinata (大日方 邦子, Obinata Kuniko) (born April 16, 1972) is a Paralympic alpine skier from Japan. She has competed at every Winter Paralympic Games since 1994, winning a total of two gold, three silver, and three bronze medals up to 2006. At the 2010 Winter Paralympics, she won two bronze medals in the women's sitting class of slalom and giant slalom.
