= David Eamer =

Canadian ice sledge hockey player

Personal information
- Nationality: Canada
Medal record
Paralympic Games
Silver medal – second place	1998 Nagano	Men's sledge hockey

Hugh David Eamer is a Canadian former ice sledge hockey player. He won a silver medal with Team Canada at the 1998 Winter Paralympics.
