= Dan Jansen (sledge hockey) =

Canadian ice sledge hockey player

Personal information
- Nationality: Canada
Medal record
Paralympic Games
Bronze medal – third place	1994 Lillehammer	Men's sledge hockey

Dan Jansen is a Canadian former ice sledge hockey player. He won a bronze medal with Team Canada at the 1994 Winter Paralympics.
