= Jamie Eddy =

Canadian ice sledge hockey player

Personal information
- Nationality: Canada
- Born: December 14, 1972 (age 53) Sudbury, Ontario, Canada
Medal record
Paralympic Games
| Bronze medal – third place | 1994 Lillehammer | Men's sledge hockey |
| Silver medal – second place | 1998 Nagano | Men's sledge hockey |

Jamie Eddy (born December 14, 1972) is a Canadian former ice sledge hockey player. He won medals with Team Canada at the 1994 Winter Paralympics and 1998 Winter Paralympics.
