= Leif Wahlstedt =

Swedish ice sledge hockey player

Personal information
- Nationality: Sweden
- Born: 31 March 1946 (age 80) Södertälje, Sweden
Medal record
Paralympic Games
Gold medal – first place	1994 Lillehammer	Men's sledge hockey
Bronze medal – third place	1998 Nagano	Men's sledge hockey
Bronze medal – third place	2002 Salt Lake City	Men's sledge hockey

Leif Wahlstedt (born 31 March 1946) is a Swedish former ice sledge hockey player. He won medals for Sweden at the 1994 Winter Paralympics, 1998 Winter Paralympics and 2002 Winter Paralympics.
