= Angelo Gavillucci =

Canadian sledge hockey player

Personal information
- Nationality: Canada
Medal record
Men's sledge hockey
Representing Canada
Paralympic Games
Bronze medal – third place	1994 Lillehammer	Team competition
Silver medal – second place	1998 Nagano	Team competition

Angelo Gavillucci is a Canadian former ice sledge hockey player. He won medals with Team Canada at the 1994 Winter Paralympics and 1998 Winter Paralympics.
