= Bengt-Gösta Johansson =

Swedish ice sledge hockey player (born 1944)

Personal information
- Nationality: Swedish
- Born: 24 September 1944 (age 81) Solna, Sweden
Medal record
Representing Sweden
Winter Paralympic Games
Ice sledge hockey
Gold medal – first place	1994 Lillehammer	Team competition
Bronze medal – third place	1998 Nagano	Team competition
Bronze medal – third place	2002 Salt Lake City	Team competition
Men's ice sledge speed racing
Bronze medal – third place	1980 Geilo	100 m - class I

Bengt-Gösta Johansson (born 24 September 1944) is a Swedish former ice sledge hockey player. He won medals for Sweden at the 1994 Winter Paralympics, 1998 Winter Paralympics and 2002 Winter Paralympics.
