= Bengt-Arne Johansson (sledge hockey) =

Swedish ice sledge hockey player

Personal information
- Nationality: Sweden
Medal record
Paralympic Games
Gold medal – first place	1994 Lillehammer	Men's sledge hockey
Bronze medal – third place	1998 Nagano	Men's sledge hockey

Bengt-Arne Johansson is a Swedish former ice sledge hockey player. He won medals for Sweden at the 1994 Winter Paralympics and 1998 Winter Paralympics.
