= Pat Griffin (sledge hockey) =

Canadian sledge hockey player

Personal information
- Nationality: Canada
- Born: November 14, 1960 (age 65) Alberton, Prince Edward Island, Canada
Medal record
Paralympic Games
Bronze medal – third place	1994 Lillehammer	Men's sledge hockey

Pat Griffin (born November 14, 1960) is a Canadian former ice sledge hockey player. He won a bronze medal with Team Canada at the 1994 Winter Paralympics.
