= Dan Henderson (sledge hockey) =

American Sled hockey player

Personal information
- Nationality: United States
- Born: January 4, 1965 (age 61) Boulder, Colorado, United States
Medal record
Paralympic Games
| Gold medal – first place | 2002 Salt Lake City | Men's sledge hockey |

Daniel "Hondo" Henderson was born January 4, 1965, in Boulder, Colorado. He is an American former ice sledge hockey player. He won a gold medal with Team USA at the 2002 Winter Paralympics. Dan had the lower part of his left leg amputated as a result of a car accident in 1972. He was introduced to the sport of sled hockey by teammate and friend, Dave Conklin in 1989. Dan was on the very first USA sled hockey team, and every USA team up until he retired after winning the gold medal at the 2002 Salt Lake City Paralympics. Dan also competed in the 1998 Paralympic games in Nagano, Japan. Dan is a pioneer of the sport in the United States. 2022 inducted into the Olympic/Paralympic Hall of Fame. 2024 inducted into the US Hockey Hall of Fame.
