= Lou Mulvihill =

Canadian ice sledge hockey player

Personal information
- Nationality: Canada
- Born: November 17, 1952 (age 73) Renfrew, Ontario, Canada
Medal record
Paralympic Games
Bronze medal – third place	1994 Lillehammer	Men's sledge hockey

Lou Mulvihill (born November 17, 1952) is a Canadian former ice sledge hockey player. He won a bronze medal with Team Canada at the 1994 Winter Paralympics. He also competed at the 2002 Winter Paralympics.
