= Yves Carrier =

Canadian ice sledge hockey player

Personal information
- Nationality: Canada
Medal record
Paralympic Games
Bronze medal – third place	1994 Lillehammer	Men's sledge hockey
Silver medal – second place	1998 Nagano	Men's sledge hockey

Yves Joseph Carrier is a Canadian former ice sledge hockey player. He won medals with Team Canada at the 1994 Winter Paralympics and 1998 Winter Paralympics.
