= Dean Mellway =

Canadian ice sledge hockey player

Personal information
- Nationality: Canada
Medal record
Paralympic Games
Gold medal – first place	1976 Toronto	Snooker - Men's singles
Bronze medal – third place	1994 Lillehammer	Men's sledge hockey
Silver medal – second place	1998 Nagano	Men's sledge hockey

Dean Mellway is a Canadian former Paralympic athlete. He won medals for Canada at the 1994 Winter Paralympics and 1998 Winter Paralympics for sledge hockey, and at the 1976 Summer Paralympics in men's snooker.
