= Canada men's national para ice hockey team =

Men's national ice sledge hockey team representing Canada

Canada
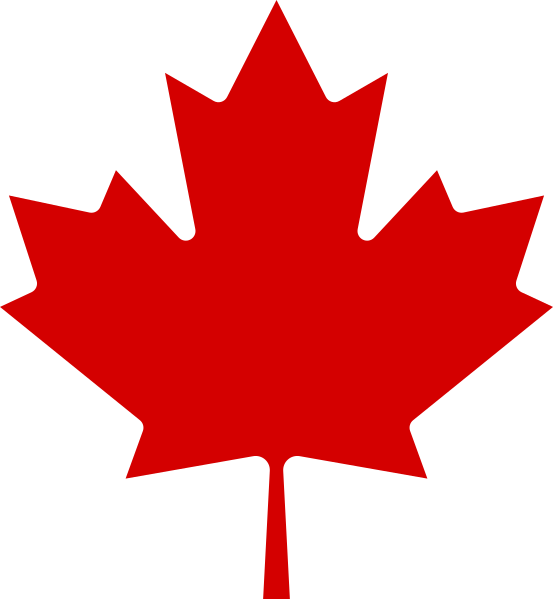
- Nickname: Team Canada (Équipe Canada)
- Association: Hockey Canada
- Head coach: Russ Herrington
- Assistants: Greg Westlake; Mike Fountain; Gregory Ireland
- Team colours

Paralympics
- Appearances: 8 (first in 1994)
- Medals: Gold: 1 – 2006 Silver: 4 – 1998, 2018, 2022, 2026 Bronze: 2 – 1994, 2014

World Para Ice Hockey Championships
- Appearances: 14 (first in 1996)
- Best result: (gold) Gold: 5 – 2000, 2008, 2013, 2017, 2024 (silver) Silver: 5 – 2015, 2019, 2021, 2023, 2025 (bronze) Bronze: 3 – 1996, 2009, 2012

Para Hockey Cup
- Appearances: 15 (first in 2007)
- Best result: Gold: 5 – 2007, 2008, 2011 (A), 2011 (N), 2013; Silver: 9 - 2009, 2012, 2016 (J), 2016 (D), 2017, 2018, 2019, 2022, 2023; Bronze: 1 - 2015

International Para Hockey Cup
- Appearances: 2 (first in 2022)
- Best result: Gold: 0 Silver: 2 - 2022, 2023; Bronze: 0

The Canada national ice sledge hockey team is the men's team representing Canada at international competition. The team has been overseen since 2003 by Hockey Canada, a member of the International Ice Hockey Federation. From 1993 until 2003, the team was an associate member of Hockey Canada. Since 2010 international para ice hockey has been a mixed, however there has only been one woman to ever play on the Canadian team. The national team created exclusively for Canadian women is the Canada women's national ice sledge hockey team. This article deals chiefly with the national men's team.

The team is featured in the 2008 documentary "Sledhead".

== Competition achievements ==
=== Paralympic Games ===
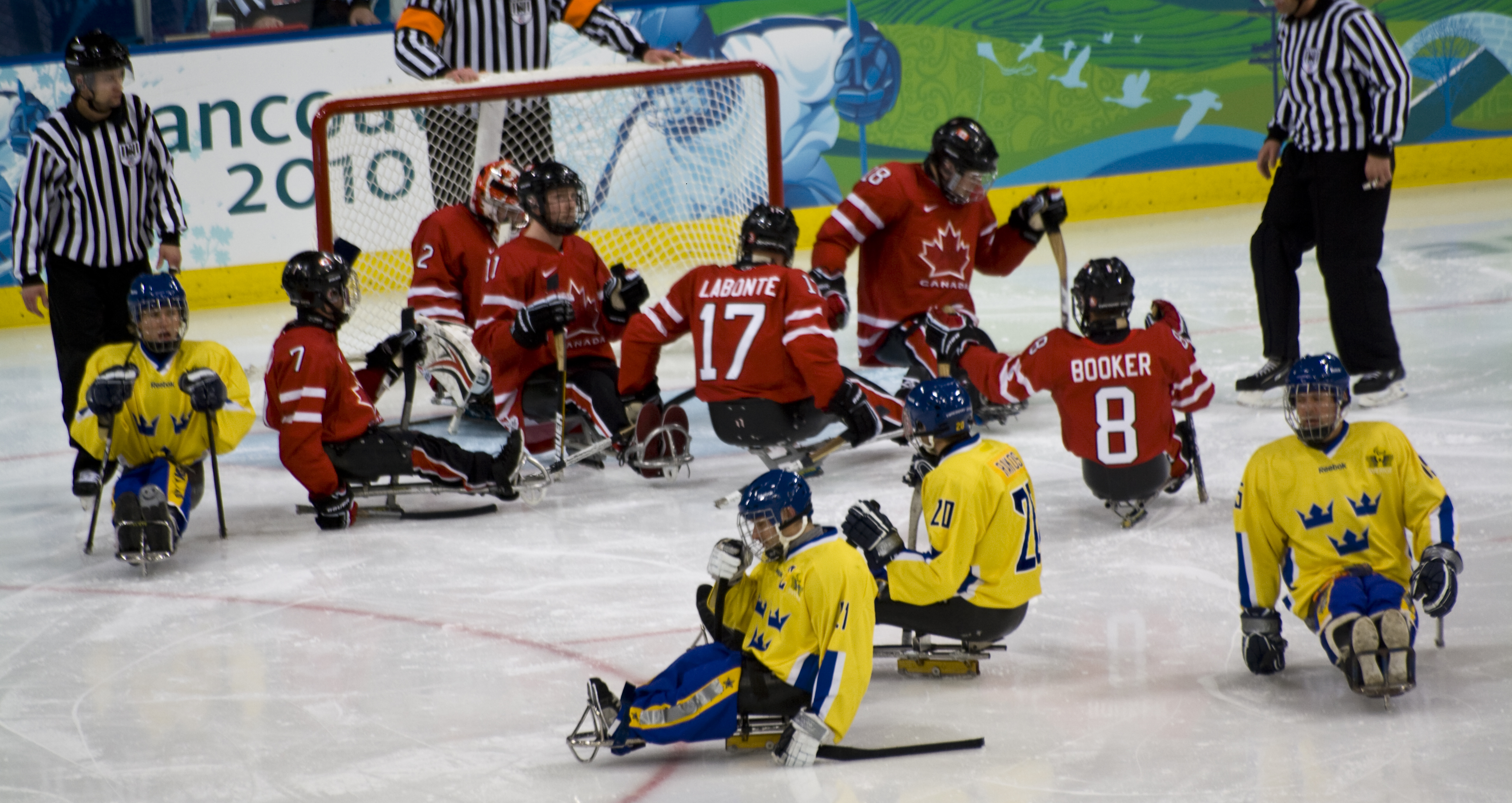
Canada vs Sweden, Vancouver 2010

Year	Host	GP	W	L	T	GF	GA	Coach	Manager/GM	Captain	Finish	Ref.
1994	Lillehammer, Norway	5	3	1	1	8	2				Bronze	
1998	Nagano, Japan	5	2	2	1	7	7				Silver	
2002	Salt Lake City, United States	6	1	3	2	9	14				4th	
2006	Turin, Italy	5	4	1	0	30	4				Gold	
2010	Vancouver, Canada	5	3	2	0	21	6				4th	
2014	Sochi, Russia	5	4	1	0	18	4				Bronze	
2018	Pyeongchang, South Korea	5	4	1	0	43	2	Ken Babey (H), Danny Lynch (A), Luke Pierce (A)			Silver	
2022	Beijing, China	4	2	2	0	17	10				Silver	

=== World Para Ice Hockey Championships ===
The World Para Ice Hockey Championships, known before 30 November 2016 as the IPC Ice Sledge Hockey World Championships, are the world championships for para ice hockey. They are organized by the International Paralympic Committee through its World Para Ice Hockey subcommittee.

Year	Host	Finish
1996	Nynäshamn, Sweden	Bronze
2000	West Valley City, United States	Gold
2004	Örnsköldsvik, Sweden	4th
2008	Marlborough, United States	Gold
2009	Ostrava, Czech Republic	Bronze
2012	Hamar, Norway	Bronze
2013	Goyang, South Korea	Gold
2015	Buffalo, United States	Silver
2017	Gangneung, South Korea	Gold
2019	Ostrava, Czech Republic	Silver
2021	Ostrava, Czech Republic	Silver
2023	Moose Jaw, Canada	Silver
2024	Calgary, Canada	Gold
2025	Buffalo, United States	Silver

=== Para Hockey Cup ===
The Para Hockey Cup, formerly the World Sledge Hockey Challenge (WSHC) is an international para ice hockey invitational tournament hosted by Canada's National Sledge Team in which three top nations are invited to compete.

Edition	Host	Finish
2007	Kelowna, British Columbia	Gold
2008	Charlottetown, Prince Edward Island	Gold
2009	Charlottetown, Prince Edward Island	Silver
2011 April	London, Ontario	Gold
2011 November	Calgary, Alberta	Gold
2012	Calgary, Alberta	Silver
2013	Toronto, Ontario	Gold
2015	Leduc, Alberta	Silver
2016 January	Bridgewater, Nova Scotia	Silver
2016 December	Charlottetown, Prince Edward Island	Silver
2017	Charlottetown, Prince Edward Island	Silver
2018	London, Ontario	Silver
2019	Paradise, Newfoundland and Labrador	Silver
2022	Bridgewater, Nova Scotia	'Silver
2023	Quispamsis, New Brunswick	Silver

=== International Para Hockey Cup ===
The International Para Hockey Cup is a para ice hockey tournament hosted by Czechia.

Year	Host	GP	W	L	GF	GA	Finish	Ref.
2021	(Czech Republic) Ostrava	Withdrew due to COVID-19 pandemic						
2022	(Czech Republic) Ostrava	5	3	2	14	15	Silver	
2023	(Czech Republic) Ostrava	5	2	3	13	19	Silver	

== 2023–24 roster ==
The following is the Canadian roster for the 2023–24 season.

No.	Pos.	Name	Height	Weight	Birthdate	Hometown
33	G	Mitchell Garrett	5 ft 10 in (178 cm)	183 lb (83 kg)	4 October 1994	Surrey, BC
54	G	Adam Kingsmill	5 ft 8 in (173 cm)	129 lb (59 kg)	3 March 2000	Smithers, BC
5	D	Tyrone Henry	6 ft 0 in (183 cm)	157 lb (71 kg)	21 October 1993	Ottawa, ON
7	D	Zach Lavin	6 ft 1 in (185 cm)	176 lb (80 kg)	31 January 1997	Essex, ON
17	D	Shawn Burnett	5 ft 11 in (180 cm)	133 lb (60 kg)	2 May 2003	McMasterville, QC
20	D	Jacob LeBlanc	5 ft 6 in (168 cm)	124 lb (56 kg)	31 July 2002	Moncton, NB
61	D	Rob Armstrong	5 ft 11 in (180 cm)	155 lb (70 kg)	12 September 1996	Erin, ON
92	D	Auren Halbert	6 ft 1 in (185 cm)	161 lb (73 kg)	2 February 2003	Calgary, AB
2	F	Rod Crane	6 ft 2 in (188 cm)	160 lb (73 kg)	6 September 1991	Clarksburg, ON
4	F	James Dunn	6 ft 1 in (185 cm)	149 lb (68 kg)	12 November 2000	Wallacetown, ON
8	F	Tyler McGregor	5 ft 9 in (175 cm)	168 lb (76 kg)	11 March 1994	Forest, ON
9	F	Corbyn Smith	5 ft 7 in (170 cm)	136 lb (62 kg)	5 August 1998	Monkton, ON
11	F	Adam Dixon	5 ft 9 in (175 cm)	196 lb (89 kg)	13 August 1989	Midland, ON
15	F	Jonathan Daigle	5 ft 11 in (180 cm)	132 lb (60 kg)	28 March 2008	Boucherville, QC
19	F	Dominic Cozzolino	5 ft 9 in (175 cm)	169 lb (77 kg)	23 August 1994	Mississauga, ON
23	F	Liam Hickey	5 ft 11 in (180 cm)	152 lb (69 kg)	25 March 1998	St. John's, NL
24	F	Sam Swafford	5 ft 4 in (163 cm)	150 lb (68 kg)	6 August 2000	Ottawa, ON
25	F	Saoud Messaoudi	5 ft 1 in (155 cm)	128 lb (58 kg)	5 November 2001	Saint-Hubert, QC
26	F	Anton Jacobs-Webb	6 ft 1 in (185 cm)	164 lb (74 kg)	18 September 2000	Gatineau, QC
29	F	Micah Kovacevich	5 ft 5 in (165 cm)	135 lb (61 kg)	2 October 1997	Edmonton, AB

== See also ==
- Canada men's national ice hockey team
- Canada women's national ice sledge hockey team
- World Para Ice Hockey Championships
- Para ice hockey at the Winter Paralympics
- Canadian Tire Para Hockey Cup
