= Italy at the Paralympics =

- IPC code: ITA
- NPC: Comitato Italiano Paralimpico
- Website: www.comitatoparalimpico.it (in Italian)
- Medals Ranked 14th: Gold 214 Silver 249 Bronze 294 Total 757

Summer appearances
- 1960; 1964; 1968; 1972; 1976; 1980; 1984; 1988; 1992; 1996; 2000; 2004; 2008; 2012; 2016; 2020; 2024

Winter appearances
- 1980; 1984; 1988; 1992; 1994; 1998; 2002; 2006; 2010; 2014; 2018; 2022; 2026

Italy has sent delegations to the Summer Paralympics since the first games in 1960, and to the Winter Paralympics since 1980.

The Paralympic Games are a multi-sport event for athletes with physical and sensorial disabilities. This includes athletes with mobility disabilities, amputations, blindness, and cerebral palsy. The Paralympic Games are held every four years, following the Olympic Games, and are governed by the International Paralympic Committee (IPC).

== Hosted Games ==
Italy has hosted the Games on three occasions.

Games	Host city	Dates	Nations	Participants	Events
1960 Summer Paralympics	Rome	25 August – 11 September	23	400	57
2006 Winter Paralympics	Turin	10–19 March	39	486	58
2026 Winter Paralympics	Milan-Cortina d'Ampezzo	6–15 March	55	612	79

== Medal tables ==
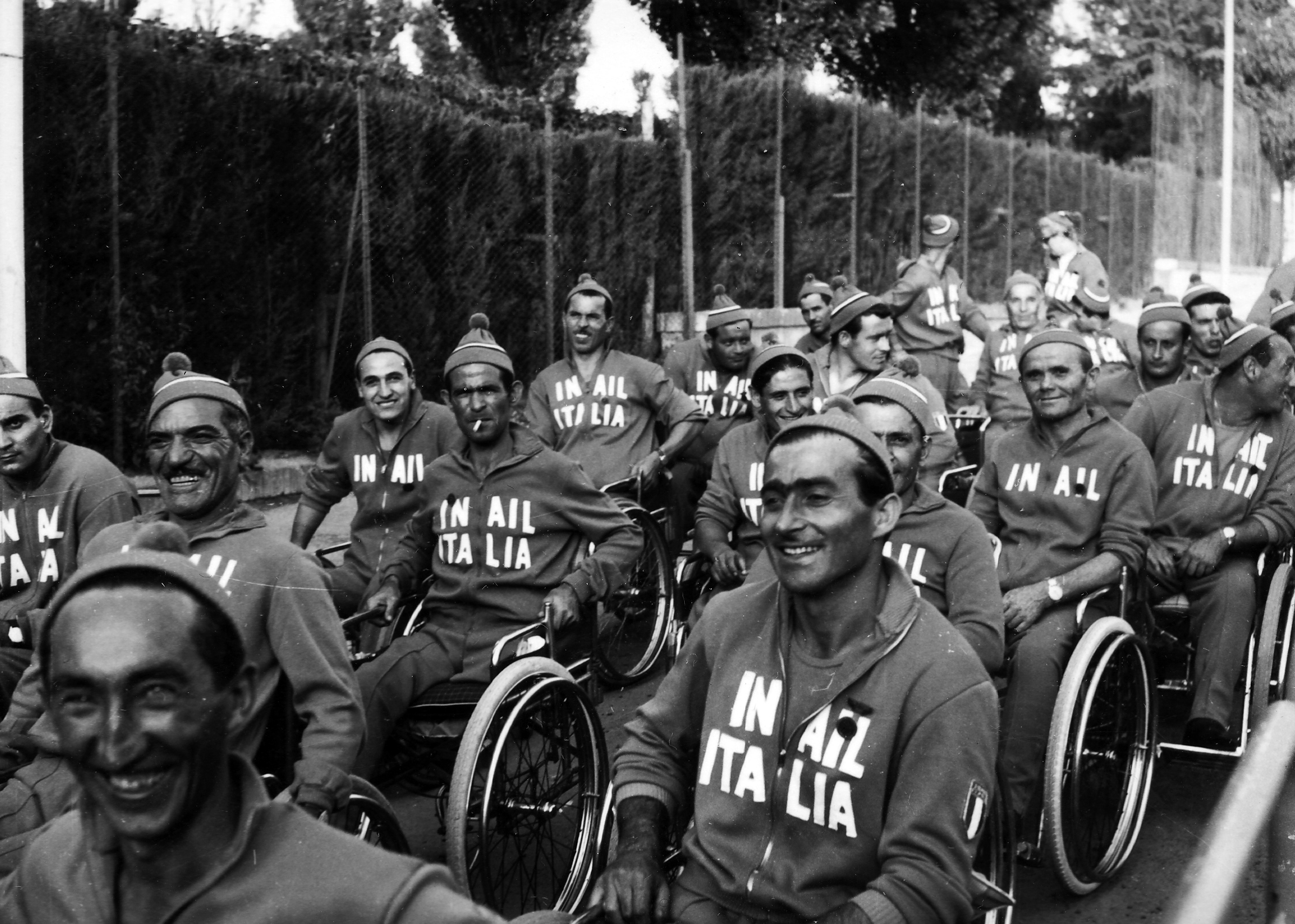
Italian paralympic athletes at the first edition of Paralympics in 1960 in Rome

Host country

=== Medals by Summer Games ===
Games	Athletes	**Gold**	**Silver**	**Bronze**	Total	Rank
(Italy) 1960 Rome	65	**29**	28	23	**80**	1
(Japan) 1964 Tokyo	19	14	15	16	**45**	3
(Israel) 1968 Tel-Aviv	38	12	10	17	**39**	7
(Germany) 1972 Heidelberg	25	8	4	5	**17**	9
(Canada) 1976 Toronto	24	2	5	11	**18**	25
(Netherlands) 1980 Arnhem	38	6	5	9	**20**	20
(United Kingdom) (United States) 1984 Stoke Mandeville/New York	61	9	19	14	**42**	21
(South Korea) 1988 Seoul	96	16	15	27	**58**	16
(Spain) 1992 Barcelona	88	10	7	18	**35**	17
(United States) 1996 Atlanta	69	11	20	14	**45**	14
(Australia) 2000 Sydney	63	9	8	10	**27**	18
(Greece) 2004 Athens	77	4	8	7	**19**	31
(China) 2008 Beijing	86	4	7	7	**18**	28
(United Kingdom) 2012 London	98	9	8	11	**28**	13
(Brazil) 2016 Rio de Janeiro	101	10	14	15	**39**	9
(Japan) 2020 Tokyo	115	14	**29**	26	**69**	9
(France) 2024 Paris	141	24	15	**32**	**71**	6
Total		191	217	262	670	12

=== Medals by Winter Games ===
Games	Athletes	**Gold**	**Silver**	**Bronze**	Total	Rank
(Norway) 1980 Geilo	1	0	0	0	**0**	—
(Austria) 1984 Innsbruck	7	0	0	1	**1**	13
(Austria) 1988 Innsbruck	24	3	0	**6**	**9**	10
(France) 1992 Tignes-Albertsville	27	0	1	3	**4**	16
(Norway) 1994 Lillehammer	24	0	**7**	**6**	**13**	17
(Japan) 1998 Nagano	21	3	4	3	**10**	12
(United States) 2002 Salt Lake City	14	3	3	3	**9**	11
(Italy) 2006 Turin	39	2	2	4	**8**	9
(Canada) 2010 Vancouver	35	1	3	3	**7**	11
(Russia) 2014 Sochi	34	0	0	0	**0**	—
(South Korea) 2018 Pyeongchang	25	2	2	1	**5**	12
(China) 2022 Beijing	32	2	3	2	**7**	11
(Italy) 2026 Milano Cortina	42	**7**	**7**	2	16	4
Total		23	32	32	87	16

=== Multiple medallists ===
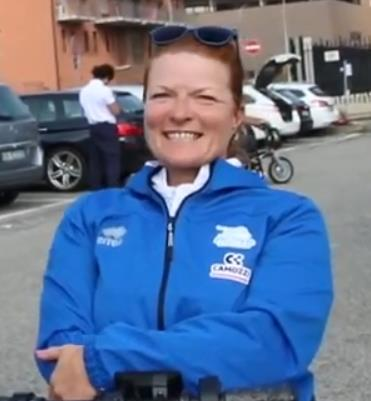
Francesca Porcellato, 14 medals in three sports at Summer and Winter Paralympics.

These are official report of International Paralympic Committee. Athletes in bold are athletes who are still competing.

Still active

Updated to Tokyo 2020.

#	Athlete	Years (no. of games)	1st place, gold medalist(s)	2nd place, silver medalist(s)	3rd place, bronze medalist(s)	Total
1	Roberto Marson	1964-1976 (4)	16	7	3	26
2	Maria Scutti	1960 (1)	10	3	2	15
3	Anna Maria Toso	1960-1964 (2)	8	10	2	20
4	Luca Pancalli	1984-1996 (4)	8	6	1	15
5	Alvise De Vidi	1988-2012 (7)	8	3	4	15
6	Franco Rossi	1960-1972 (4)	6	3	4	13
7	Paola Fantato	1992-2004 (4)	5	1	2	8
7	Santo Mangano	1984-1996 (4)	5	1	2	8
9	Renzo Rogo	1960-1964 (2)	5	0	2	7
10	Giovanni Ferraris	1960-1976 (5)	4	4	5	13
11	Alex Zanardi	2012-2016 (2)	4	2	0	6
12	Bruno Oberhammer	1984-1998 (5)	3	5	4	12
13	Mariella Bertini	1984-1996 (4)	3	5	0	8
13	Luca Mazzone	2000-2020 (6)	3	5	0	8
15	Francesca Porcellato	1988-2016 (10)	3	4	7	14
16	Aldo Manganaro	1992-2008 (5)	3	2	4	9

== See also ==
- Italy at the Summer Paralympics
- Italy at the Winter Paralympics
- Italy at the Olympics
