= Alpine skiing at the 2010 Winter Paralympics – Women's combined =

Women's Super Combined at the X Paralympic Winter Games
- Paralympic alpine skiing
- Venue: Whistler Blackcomb
- Dates: March 21, 2010

The women's super combined competition of the Vancouver 2010 Paralympics is held at Whistler Blackcomb in Whistler, British Columbia. The competition has been rescheduled to Sunday March 21 due to recent weather conditions.

It was the first time super combined was arranged in the Paralympics.

== Visually impaired ==
In the combined visually impaired, the athlete with a visual impairment has a sighted guide. The two skiers are considered a team, and dual medals are awarded.

Rank	Bib	Name	Country	Super G	Rank	Slalom	Rank	Total	Difference
1st place, gold medalist(s)	55	Henrieta Farkasova; Guide: Natalia Subrtova	Slovakia	1:35.26	1	59.35	1	2:34.61	
2nd place, silver medalist(s)	61	Viviane Forest; Guide: Lindsay Debou	Canada	1:35.97	2	59.97	2	2:35.94	+1.33
3rd place, bronze medalist(s)	58	Danelle Umstead; Guide: Rob Umstead	United States	1:41.70	3	1:07.05	6	2:48.75	+14.14
4	59	Anna Cohi Fornell; Guide: Raquel Garcia Borreguero	Spain	1:50.51	5	1:01.34	3	2:51.85	+17.24
5	57	Natasha de Troyer; Guide: Diego van de Voorde	Belgium	1:48.87	4	1:04.58	5	2:53.45	+18.84
6	64	Caitlin Sarubbi; Guide: Gwynn Watkins	United States	1:57.53	6	1:04.49	4	3:02.02	+27.41
	62	Anna Kuliskova; Guide: Michaela Hubacova	Czech Republic	DNF					
	63	Melissa Perrine; Guide: Andrew Bor	Australia	DNF					
	56	Alexandra Frantseva; Guide: Polina Popova	Russia	DNS					
	60	Sabine Gasteiger; Guide: Stefan Schoner	Austria	DNS					

== Sitting ==
Rank	Bib	Name	Country	Super G	Rank	Slalom	Rank	Total	Difference
1st place, gold medalist(s)	80	Stephani Victor	United States	1:38.46	1	1:02.25	1	2:40.71	
2nd place, silver medalist(s)	79	Claudia Loesch	Austria	1:41.94	3	1:02.34	2	2:44.28	+3.57
3rd place, bronze medalist(s)	78	Alana Nichols	United States	1:40.58	2	1:06.96	5	2:47.54	+6.83
4	84	Anna Schaffelhuber	Germany	1:46.26	4	1:06.58	4	2:52.84	+12.13
5	83	Laurie Stephens	United States	1:46.79	5	1:06.22	3	2:53.01	+12.30
	85	Daila Dameno	Italy	2:17.85	6	DSQ			
	83	Tatsuko Aoki	Japan	DNF					
	81	Kuniko Obinata	Japan	DNS					

== Standing ==
Rank	Bib	Name	Country	Super G	Rank	Slalom	Rank	Total	Difference
1st place, gold medalist(s)	71	Lauren Woolstencroft	Canada	1:26.84	1	55.83	1	2:22.67	
2nd place, silver medalist(s)	67	Solène Jambaqué	France	1:33.51	2	1:01.31	6	2:34.82	+12.15
3rd place, bronze medalist(s)	70	Karolina Wisniewska	Canada	1:35.21	3	1:00.26	5	2:35.47	+12.80
4	66	Marie Bochet	France	1:37.29	7	58.85	3	2:36.14	+13.47
5	73	Allison Jones	United States	1:38.07	8	58.66	2	2:36.73	+14.06
6	72	Petra Smarzova	Slovakia	1:35.46	6	1:01.91	7	2:37.37	+14.70
7	68	Melania Corradini	Italy	1:35.40	4	1:02.61	8	2:38.01	+15.34
8	74	Inga Medvedeva	Russia	1:39.71	9	1:00.24	4	2:39.95	+17.28
9	77	Katja Saarinen	Finland	1:42.55	10	1:02.86	9	2:45.41	+22.74
10	76	Melanie Schwartz	Canada	1:46.26	11	1:08.25	10	2:54.51	+31.84
	65	Iveta Chlebakova	Slovakia	1:35.40	4	DSQ			
	69	Andrea Rothfuss	Germany	DNF					
	75	Marina Perterer	Austria	DNS					

== See also ==
- Alpine skiing at the 2010 Winter Olympics
