= Italy at the 2022 Winter Paralympics =

- Flag of Italy
- IPC code: ITA
- NPC: Comitato Italiano Paralimpico
- Website: comitatoparalimpico.it (in Italian)

in Beijing, China 4 March 2022 – 13 March 2022
- Competitors: 32 (28 men and 4 women) in 4 sports
- Flag bearer: Giacomo Bertagnolli
- Medals Ranked 11th: Gold 2 Silver 3 Bronze 2 Total 7

Winter Paralympics appearances (overview)
- 1980; 1984; 1988; 1992; 1994; 1998; 2002; 2006; 2010; 2014; 2018; 2022; 2026

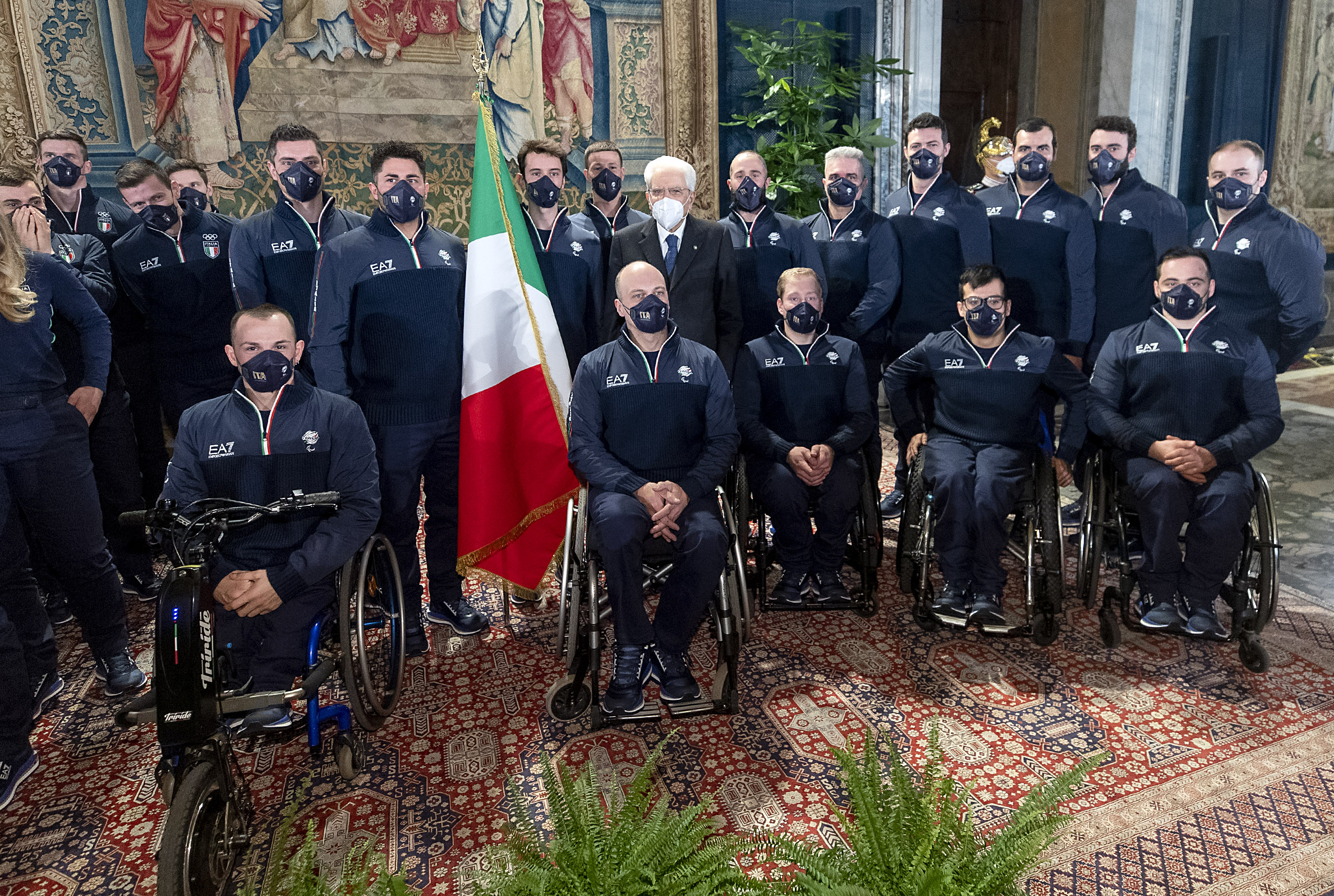
President Sergio Mattarella with the Paralympic team at the ceremony of delivery of the Italian Flag

Italy competed at the 2022 Winter Paralympics in Beijing, China which took place between 4–13 March 2022.

== Medalists ==
The following Italian competitors won medals at the games. In the discipline sections below, the medalists' names are bolded.

Medal	Name	Sport	Event	Date
Gold	Giacomo Bertagnolli; Guide: Andrea Ravelli	Alpine skiing	Men's slalom, visually impaired	13 March
Gold	Giacomo Bertagnolli; Guide: Andrea Ravelli	Alpine skiing	Men's super combined, visually impaired	7 March
Silver	Giacomo Bertagnolli; Guide: Andrea Ravelli	Alpine skiing	Men's giant slalom, visually impaired	10 March
Silver	Rene de Silvestro	Alpine skiing	Men's giant slalom, sitting	10 March
Silver	Giacomo Bertagnolli; Guide: Andrea Ravelli	Alpine skiing	Men's super-G, visually impaired	6 March
Bronze	Rene de Silvestro	Alpine skiing	Men's slalom, sitting	13 March
Bronze	Giuseppe Romele	Cross-country skiing	Men's 12.5 km, sitting	12 March

**Medals by sport**
**Sport**	1st place, gold medalist(s)	2nd place, silver medalist(s)	3rd place, bronze medalist(s)	**Total**
Alpine skiing	2	3	1	**6**
Cross country	0	0	1	**1**
**Total**	**2**	**3**	**2**	**7**

**Medals by gender**
**Gender**	1st place, gold medalist(s)	2nd place, silver medalist(s)	3rd place, bronze medalist(s)	**Total**
Male	2	3	2	**7**
Female	0	0	0	**0**
Mixed	0	0	0	**0**
**Total**	**2**	**3**	**2**	**7**

== Participants ==
32 in 4 sports. 4 athletes are women.

Sport	Men	Women	Total
Para-alpine skiing	4 + 1 guide	2 + 2 guides	6 + 3 guides
Para cross country skiing	3	0	3
Para ice hockey	17	0	17
Para snowboard	3	0	3
TOTAL	27 + 1 guides	2 + 2 guides	29 + 3 guides

== Alpine skiing ==
Four male athletes and two female athletes, plus three guides, competed in alpine skiing for Italy, including the country's flagbearer in the opening ceremony, Giacomo Bertagnolli.

Men

Athlete	Event	Run 1		Run 2		Total	
Athlete	Event	Time	Rank	Time	Rank	Time	Rank
Federico Pelizzari	Downhill, standing	—N/a				1:19.73	12
Federico Pelizzari	Salom, standing	DNF					
Federico Pelizzari	Giant slalom, standing	58.77	4	57.59	4	1:56.36	4
Federico Pelizzari	Super-G, standing	—N/a				1:14.70	18
Federico Pelizzari	Super combined, standing	1:15.15	13	40.74	3	1:55.89	5
Davide Bendotti	Salom, standing	DNF					
Davide Bendotti	Giant slalom, standing	1:05.20	21	1:02.30	20	2:07.50	21
Davide Bendotti	Super-G, standing	—N/a				1:16.30	22
Davide Bendotti	Super combined, standing	1:17.37	22	DNF			
Giacomo Bertagnolli; Guide: Andrea Ravelli	Downhill, visually impaired	—N/a				1:17.05	6
Giacomo Bertagnolli; Guide: Andrea Ravelli	Slalom, visually impaired	39.62	1	47.20	2	1:26.81	1st place, gold medalist(s)
Giacomo Bertagnolli; Guide: Andrea Ravelli	Giant slalom, visually impaired	54.88	1	56.14	2	1:51.02	2nd place, silver medalist(s)
Giacomo Bertagnolli; Guide: Andrea Ravelli	Super-G, visually impaired	—N/a				1:09.31	2nd place, silver medalist(s)
Giacomo Bertagnolli; Guide: Andrea Ravelli	Super combined, visually impaired	1:10.71	3	39.09	1	1:49.80	1st place, gold medalist(s)
René De Silvestro	Slalom, sitting	42.22	3	56.22	7	1:38.44	3rd place, bronze medalist(s)
René De Silvestro	Giant slalom, sitting	1:00.02	3	57.48	2	1:57.50	2nd place, silver medalist(s)
René De Silvestro	Super-G, sitting	—N/a				1:11.54	4
René De Silvestro	Super combined, sitting	DNF					

Women

Athlete	Event	Run 1		Run 2		Total	
Athlete	Event	Time	Rank	Time	Rank	Time	Rank
Martina Vozza; Guide: Ylenia Sabidussi	Downhill, visually impaired	—N/a				DNF	
Martina Vozza; Guide: Ylenia Sabidussi	Giant slalom, visually impaired	1:03.20	8	1:05.63	8	2:08.83	8
Martina Vozza; Guide: Ylenia Sabidussi	Slalom, visually impaired	DNF					
Martina Vozza; Guide: Ylenia Sabidussi	Super combined, visually impaired	DNF					
Martina Vozza; Guide: Ylenia Sabidussi	Super-G, visually impaired	—N/a				DNF	
Chiara Mazzel; Guide: Fabrizio Casal	Giant slalom, visually impaired	DNF					
Chiara Mazzel; Guide: Fabrizio Casal	Slalom, visually impaired	48.39	7	51.21	9	1:39.60	7

== Cross-country skiing ==
Three Italian athletes competed in cross-country skiing.

Men

Athlete	Event	Qualification		Semifinal		Final	
Athlete	Event	Result	Rank	Result	Rank	Result	Rank
Cristian Toninelli	1.5 km sprint, sitting	3:20.99	24	Did not advance			
Cristian Toninelli	12.5 km free, standing	—N/a				41:28.5	16
Michele Biglione	1.5 km sprint, sitting	2:48.54	29	Did not advance			
Michele Biglione	10 km, sitting	—N/a				40:56.0	25
Michele Biglione	18 km, sitting	—N/a				57:38.0	21
Giuseppe Romele	1.5 km sprint, sitting	2:24.46	8 Q	2:57.6	4	Did not advance	
Giuseppe Romele	10 km, sitting	—N/a				31:42.5	3rd place, bronze medalist(s)
Giuseppe Romele	18 km, sitting	—N/a				48:03.3	5

Relay

Athletes	Event	Final	
Athletes	Event	Time	Rank
Michele Biglione; Giuseppe Romele; Cristian Toninelli	4 x 2.5 km open relay	34:04.7	10

== Para ice hockey ==
Italy qualified at the Paralympic Qualification Tournament held in Berlin, Germany.

Summary

Team	Event	Preliminary round				Quarterfinal	Semifinal	5th place	
Team	Event	Opposition Result	Opposition Result	Opposition Result	Rank	Opposition Result	Opposition Result	Opposition Result	Rank
Italy	Mixed tournament	Czech Republic; L 0–5	Slovakia; W 2–1 GWS	China; L 0–6	3 Q	South Korea; L 0–4	DNQ	Czech Republic; W 4–3	5

The selected players are:

- Alessandro Andreoni
- Gabriele Araudo
- Bruno Balossetti
- Cristoph De Paoli
- Alex Enederle
- Stephan Kafmann
- Julian Kasslatter
- Gabriele Lanza
- Nils Larch
- Andrea Macrì
- Roberto Radice
- Matteo Remotti Marnini
- Gianluigi Rosa
- Santino Stillitano
- Francesco Torella
- Gian Luca Cavaliere
- Stefan Kerschbaumer

Preliminary round

Pos	Team	Pld	W	OTW	OTL	L	GF	GA	GD	Pts	Qualification
1	China (H)	3	3	0	0	0	18	2	+16	9	Quarterfinals
2	Czech Republic	3	2	0	0	1	10	5	+5	6	Quarterfinals
3	Italy	3	0	1	0	2	2	12	−10	2	Quarterfinals
4	Slovakia	3	0	0	1	2	1	12	−11	1	Eliminated

Source: Beijing 2022
(H) Host

5 March 2022; 16:35	Czech Republic	5–0 (2–0, 2–0, 1–0)	Italy	Beijing National Indoor Stadium, Beijing

Game reference

Martin Kudela
Goalies
Gabriele Araudo
Julian Kasslatter
Referee:
(Norway) Kenneth Danielsen
Linesmen:
(Serbia) Tibor Fazekaš
(Austria) David Nothegger

Kubeš (Wagner, Raul) (EA) – 10:49	1–0
Zelinka (Doležal, Raul) – 12:36	2–0
Palát (Krupička, Hábl) – 15:54	3–0
Hečko (Wagner) – 17:31	4–0
Geier (Wagner, Kubeš) (PP) – 36:35	5–0

6 min
Penalties
2 min
14
Shots
11

6 March 2022; 16:35	Italy	2–1 GWS (0–0, 0–1, 1–0) (OT: 0–0) (SO: 1–0)	Slovakia	Beijing National Indoor Stadium, Beijing

Game reference
Gabriele Araudo; Julian Kasslatter	Goalies	Eduard Lepáček	Referee: (Norway) Owe Lüthcke; Linesmen: (Sweden) Tony Rundström (Czech Republic) Jan Vaněk
/ 0–1 / 29:50 – Korman (Stašák); Rosa (Larch) – 39:03 / 1–1			Referee: (Norway) Owe Lüthcke; Linesmen: (Sweden) Tony Rundström (Czech Republic) Jan Vaněk
Larch; Depaoli (miss); Rosa; Larch	Shootout	(miss) Stašák; Joppa; Ligda; (miss) Joppa	Referee: (Norway) Owe Lüthcke; Linesmen: (Sweden) Tony Rundström (Czech Republic) Jan Vaněk
2 min	Penalties	4 min	Referee: (Norway) Owe Lüthcke; Linesmen: (Sweden) Tony Rundström (Czech Republic) Jan Vaněk
24	Shots	12	Referee: (Norway) Owe Lüthcke; Linesmen: (Sweden) Tony Rundström (Czech Republic) Jan Vaněk

8 March 2022; 16:35	Italy	0–6 (0–4, 0–2, 0–0)	China	Beijing National Indoor Stadium, Beijing; Attendance: 1,224

Game reference

Julian Kasslatter
Gabriele Araudo
Goalies
Wang Wei
Referee:
(Denmark) Jacob Grumsen
Linesmen:
(Sweden) Tony Rundström
(Czech Republic) Jan Vaněk

0–1	00:16 – Wang Z. (Shen)
0–2	02:41 – Bai (Wang Z.)
0–3	03:52 – Qiu (Li, Tian)
0–4	12:08 – Hu (Tian) (PP2)
0–5	17:42 – Wang Z. (Tian, Li)
0–6	25:23 – Qiu (Lyu)

22 min
Penalties
10 min
1
Shots
25

Quarterfinal

9 March 2022; 16:35	South Korea	4–0 (1–0, 1–0, 2–0)	Italy	Beijing National Indoor Stadium, Beijing; Attendance: 1,206

Game reference

Choi Hyuk-jun
Goalies
Gabriele Araudo
Referee:
(United States) Bobby Esposito
Linesmen:
(Canada) Matt Fergenbaum
(Sweden) Andreas Lundén

Jang D. – 03:30	1–0
Jung (Jang D., Lee Jo.) – 25:53	2–0
Lee Jo. (Jung) – 30:25	3–0
Jang D. (Jang J.) (ENG) – 42:38	4–0

10 min
Penalties
12 min
17
Shots
15

Fifth place game

11 March 2022; 16:05	Czech Republic	3–4 OT (0–0, 1–1, 2–2) (OT: 0–1)	Italy	Beijing National Indoor Stadium, Beijing

Game reference

Michal Vápenka
Goalies
Julian Kasslatter
Referee:
(United States) Bobby Esposito
Linesmen:
(Netherlands) Louis Beelen
(Serbia) Tibor Fazekaš

	0–1	24:11 – Rosa (Macrì) (PP)
Ohar (Veselý, Palát) (PP) – 27:24	1–1
Novotný (PS) – 37:05	2–1
	2–2	40:48 – Rosa (Larch, Depaoli)
Geier (Novotný, Raul) – 44:15	3–2
	3–3	44:48 – Macrì (Rosa) (EA)
	3–4	51:47 – Depaoli (Macrì)

8 min
Penalties
8 min
19
Shots
18

== Snowboarding ==
Three athletes competed for Italy in snowboarding.

Banked slalom

Athlete	Event	Run 1	Run 2	Best	Rank
Jacopo Luchini	Men's banked slalom, SB-UL	1:11.60	1:10.28	1:10.28	5
Riccardo Cardani	Men's banked slalom, SB-UL	1:12.89	1:13.25	1:12.89	10
Mirko Moro	Men's banked slalom, SB-UL	1:13.17	1:12.95	1:12.95	11

Cross

Athlete	Event	Qualification				Quarterfinal	Semifinal	Final	
Athlete	Event	Run 1	Run 2	Best	Seed	Position	Position	Position	Rank
Jacopo Luchini	Men's snowboard cross, SB-UL	1:03.34	1:22.14	1:03.34	5 Q	2 Q	3 FB	2	6
Riccardo Cardani	Men's snowboard cross, SB-UL	1:07.92	1:08.29	1:07.92	13 Q	3	Did not advance		
Mirko Moro	Men's snowboard cross, SB-UL	1:07.64	1:06.27	1:06.27	12 Q	4	Did not advance		

Qualification legend: FA – Qualify to medal round; FB – Qualify to consolation round

== See also ==
- Italy at the Paralympics
- Italy at the 2022 Winter Olympics
