= Italy at the 2018 Winter Paralympics =

- IPC code: ITA
- NPC: Comitato Italiano Paralimpico
- Website: www.comitatoparalimpico.it (in Italian)

in Pyeongchang
- Competitors: 25 in 4 sports
- Flag bearer: Florian Planker (ice sledge hockey)
- Medals Ranked 12th: Gold 2 Silver 2 Bronze 1 Total 5

Winter Paralympics appearances (overview)
- 1980; 1984; 1988; 1992; 1994; 1998; 2002; 2006; 2010; 2014; 2018; 2022; 2026

Italy competed at the 2018 Winter Paralympics in Pyeongchang, South Korea The delegation was composed by 25 competitors, and won 5 medals (two gold), after the "zero" in Sochi 2014.

== Participants ==
25 in 4 sports, all the athletes are men.

Sport	Women	Men	Total
Alpine skiing (30) ()	0	3	3
Cross-country skiing (20) ()	0	1	1
Para ice hockey (1) ()	0	17	17
Snowboarding (10) ()	0	4	4
Total	0	25	25

== Medalists ==
Medal	Name	Sport	Event	Date
Gold	Giacomo Bertagnolli; Guide: Fabrizio Casal	Alpine skiing	Men's giant slalom, visually impaired	March 14
Gold	Giacomo Bertagnolli; Guide: Fabrizio Casal	Alpine skiing	Men's slalom, visually impaired	March 17
Silver	Giacomo Bertagnolli; Guide: Fabrizio Casal	Alpine skiing	Men's Super-g, visually impaired	March 11
Silver	Manuel Pozzerle	Snowboarding	Men's Snowboard cross SB-LL2	March 12
Bronze	Giacomo Bertagnolli; Guide: Fabrizio Casal	Alpine skiing	Men's downhill, visually impaired	March 10

== Para ice hockey ==
Italy finished 4th.

Semifinals
15 March
Canada	7
South Korea	0
15 March
United States	10
Italy	1

Gold medal game
18 March
Canada	1
United States	2
Bronze medal game
17 March
South Korea	1
Italy	0

Summary

Key:

- OT – Overtime
- GWS – Match decided by penalty-shootout

Team	Group stage				Semifinal / Pl.	Final / BM / Pl.	
Team	Opposition Score	Opposition Score	Opposition Score	Rank	Opposition Score	Opposition Score	Rank
Italy men's	Norway; W 3–2 GWS	Canada; L 0–10	Sweden; W 2–0	2 QS	United States		

Preliminary round

Pos	Team	Pld	W	OTW	OTL	L	GF	GA	GD	Pts	Qualification
1	Canada	3	3	0	0	0	35	0	+35	9	Semifinals
2	Italy	3	1	1	0	1	5	12	−7	5	Semifinals
3	Norway	3	1	0	1	1	5	12	−7	4	5–8th place semifinals
4	Sweden	3	0	0	0	3	1	22	−21	0	5–8th place semifinals

Source: PyeongChang 2018

10 March 2018; 12:00	Norway	2–3 GWS (0–0, 1–1, 1–1) (OT 0–0) (SO: 0–1)	Italy	Gangneung Hockey Centre; Attendance: 5,543

Game reference

Kjell Christian Hamar
Goalies
Gabriele Araudo
Referee:
(Canada) Kevin Webinger
Linesmen:
(South Korea) Chae Young-jin
(Austria) David Nothegger

	0–1	16:02 – Kalegaris (Leperdi)
Værnes (Nordstoga, Hamre) (PP) – 26:32	1–1
	1–2	33:19 – Rosa (Larch)
Bakke (Nordstoga, Pedersen) – 42:25	2–2

Solberg (miss)
Vatne (miss)
Pedersen (miss)
Shootout
Larch
(miss) Rosa
6 min
Penalties
4 min
12
Shots
18

11 March 2018; 19:00	Canada	10–0 (3–0, 4–0, 3–0)	Italy	Gangneung Hockey Centre; Attendance: 4,795

Game reference

Corbin Watson
Goalies
Santino Stillitano
Referee:
(Japan) Sotaro Yamaguchi
Linesmen:
(Austria) David Nothegger
(Czech Republic) Leon Wesley

McGregor (Dixon, Westlake) (PP) – 03:59	1–0
Dixon (Sholomicki) – 09:21	2–0
Delaney (Cozzolino, Armstrong) – 11:36	3–0
Hickey (Bridges, Delaney) – 17:03	4–0
Hickey – 19:11	5–0
Delaney (Sholomicki) (SH) – 20:20	6–0
Delaney (Sholomicki) (SH) – 25:34	7–0
Cozzolino (Bridges) – 33:06	8–0
Dunn (SH) – 36:27	9–0
Dunn – 41:23	10–0

24 min
Penalties
6 min
16
Shots
4

12 March 2018; 19:00	Italy	2–0 (1–0, 0–0, 1–0)	Sweden	Gangneung Hockey Centre; Attendance: 4,322

Game reference
Gabriele Araudo	Goalies	Ulf Nilsson	Referee: (Japan) Sotaro Yamaguchi; Linesmen: (Czech Republic) Jan Vaněk (Czech Republic) Leon Wesley
Kalegaris (Planker, Rosa) (PP) – 13:16 / 1–0; Rosa – 39:36 / 2–0			Referee: (Japan) Sotaro Yamaguchi; Linesmen: (Czech Republic) Jan Vaněk (Czech Republic) Leon Wesley
10 min	Penalties	8 min	Referee: (Japan) Sotaro Yamaguchi; Linesmen: (Czech Republic) Jan Vaněk (Czech Republic) Leon Wesley
20	Shots	2	Referee: (Japan) Sotaro Yamaguchi; Linesmen: (Czech Republic) Jan Vaněk (Czech Republic) Leon Wesley

Semifinal

15 March 2018; 20:00	United States	10–1 (5–0, 3–0, 2–1)	Italy	Gangneung Hockey Centre; Attendance: 4,889

Game reference

Steve Cash
Jen Lee
Goalies
Gabriele Araudo
Santino Stillitano
Referee:
(Canada) Kevin Webinger
Linesmen:
(South Korea) Chae Young-jin
(Canada) Matt Clark

Grove (Landeros) – 03:23	1–0
Misiewicz (Pauls, Roybal) – 03:58	2–0
Roybal (Pauls, Misiewicz) – 04:09	3–0
Landeros (PP) – 13:50	4–0
McDermott (Grove) – 14:56	5–0
Roybal (Misiewicz) (PP) – 22:52	6–0
Landeros (Carron, Farmer) – 23:35	7–0
Farmer (Page, Pauls) – 27:44	8–0
McKee (Grove, Page) – 33:32	9–0
	9–1	38:30 – Corvino (Depaoli) (PP)
Landeros (Roybal, Hanning) (PP) – 42:03	10–1

16 min
Penalties
14 min
33
Shots
4

== See also ==
- Italy at the Paralympics
- Italy at the 2018 Winter Olympics
