= Italy at the 2014 Winter Paralympics =

- IPC code: ITA
- NPC: Comitato Italiano Paralimpico
- Website: www.comitatoparalimpico.it (in Italian)

in Sochi
- Competitors: 34 in 4 sports
- Flag bearer: Andrea Chiarotti (ice sledge hockey)
- Medals: Gold 0 Silver 0 Bronze 0 Total 0

Winter Paralympics appearances (overview)
- 1980; 1984; 1988; 1992; 1994; 1998; 2002; 2006; 2010; 2014; 2018; 2022; 2026

Italy competed at the 2014 Winter Paralympics in Sochi, Russia, held between 7–16 March 2014.

== Alpine skiing ==
Men

Athlete	Event	Run 1			Run 2			Final/Total		
Athlete	Event	Time	Diff	Rank	Time	Diff	Rank	Time	Diff	Rank
Ugo Bregant	Slalom, standing	57.94	+10.25	26	DNF					
Alessandro Daldoss; Guide: Luca Negrini	Downhill, visually impaired	—N/a						1:23.97	+2.21	6
Alessandro Daldoss; Guide: Luca Negrini	Super-G, visually impaired	—N/a						DNF		
Alessandro Daldoss; Guide: Luca Negrini	Combined, visually impaired	DNF								
Alessandro Daldoss; Guide: Luca Negrini	Giant slalom, visually impaired	1:21.43	+5.41	6	DNF					
Christian Lanthaler	Downhill, standing	—N/a						1:27.99	+3.64	8
Christian Lanthaler	Super-G, standing	—N/a						DNS		
Christian Lanthaler	Giant slalom, standing	1:24.85	+10.13	21	1:18.97	+7.82	15	2:43.82	+17.95	15
Hansjoerg Lantschner	Super-G, standing	—N/a						1:28.68	+7.76	14
Hansjoerg Lantschner	Combined, standing	1:05.88	+15.58	18	1:24.78	+6.39	12	2:30.66	+20.94	16
Hansjoerg Lantschner	Slalom, standing	DNF								
Hansjoerg Lantschner	Giant slalom, standing	1:27.58	+12.86	26	DNF					
Nicolo Maria Orsini	Giant slalom, standing	DSQ								
Andrea Valenti	Slalom, standing	1:07.05	+19.36	38	1:10.05	+18.77	30	2:17.10	+38.13	31
Andrea Valenti	Giant slalom, standing	DNF								
Marco Zanotti	Slalom, standing	1:01.74	+14.05	32	1:08.31	+17.03	28	2:10.05	+31.08	27
Marco Zanotti	Giant slalom, standing	1:26.21	+11.49	22	1:19.28	+8.13	16	2:45.49	+19.62	17

Women

Athlete	Event	Run 1			Run 2			Final/Total		
Athlete	Event	Time	Diff	Rank	Time	Diff	Rank	Time	Diff	Rank
Melania Corradini	Downhill, standing	—N/a						DNF		
Melania Corradini	Super-G, standing	—N/a						1:38.57	+14.37	8
Melania Corradini	Combined, standing	DNS								
Melania Corradini	Giant slalom, standing	DNF								

=== Snowboarding ===
Para-snowboarding is making its debut at the Winter Paralympics and it will be placed under the Alpine skiing program during the 2014 Games.

Men

Athlete	Event	Race 1		Race 2		Race 3		Total	
Athlete	Event	Time	Rank	Time	Rank	Time	Rank	Time	Rank
Giuseppe Comunale	Snowboard cross	1:09.54	20	1:19.23	26	1:13.67	22	2:23.21	23
Fabio Piscitello	Snowboard cross	1:24.34	27	1:15.90	25	1:10.28	20	2:26.18	25
Luca Righetti	Snowboard cross	1:14.75	22	1:15.09	23	1:17.33	24	2:29.84	26

Women

Athlete	Event	Race 1		Race 2		Race 3		Total	
Athlete	Event	Time	Rank	Time	Rank	Time	Rank	Time	Rank
Veronica Yoko Plebani	Snowboard cross	1:54.06	11	1:52.98	8	1:49.36	9	3:42.34	11

== Biathlon ==
Men

Athlete	Events	Final				
Athlete	Events	Real Time	Calculated Time	Missed Shots	Result	Rank
Enzo Masiello	12.5km, sitting	43:02.4	40:27.5	1+1+1+2	40:27.5	14
Enzo Masiello	15km, sitting	50:39.4	55:37.0	2+3+1+2	55:37.0	20

Women

Athlete	Events	Final				
Athlete	Events	Real Time	Calculated Time	Missed Shots	Result	Rank
Pamela Novaglio	6km, standing	22:38.3	21:44.0	0+0	21:44.0	10
Pamela Novaglio	10km, standing	36:24.6	34:57.2	0+0+0+1	34:57.2	10
Pamela Novaglio	12.5km, standing	46:59.1	46:06.3	0+0+1+0	46:06.3	10

== Cross-country skiing ==
Men

Athlete	Event	Qualification			Semifinal		Final		
Athlete	Event	Real Time	Result	Rank	Result	Rank	Real Time	Result	Rank
Enzo Masiello	10km free, sitting	—N/a					34:25.7	32:21.8	6
Enzo Masiello	15km, sitting	—N/a					46:48.0	43:59.5	7
Roland Ruepp	10km free, sitting	—N/a					DNF		
Roland Ruepp	15km, sitting	—N/a					51:45.2	50:12.0	16
Giordano Tomasoni	10km free, sitting	—N/a					41:01.6	39:47.8	25
Giordano Tomasoni	15km, sitting	—N/a					58:36.3	56:50.8	21

Women

Athlete	Event	Qualification			Semifinal		Final		
Athlete	Event	Real Time	Result	Rank	Result	Rank	Real Time	Result	Rank
Francesca Porcellato	1km sprint classic, sitting	3:09.02	2:42.56	8Q	3:09.4	6	did not advance		
Francesca Porcellato	5km, sitting	—N/a					20:42.1	17:48.2	10
Francesca Porcellato	12km, sitting	—N/a					49:50.0	42:51.4	10

== Ice sledge hockey ==
Team

- Gabriele Araudo
- Bruno Balossetti
- Gianluca Cavaliere
- Andrea Chiarotti
- Giuseppe Candello
- Valerio Corvino
- Christoph Depaoli
- Rupert Kanestrin
- Nils Larch
- Gregory Brian Alexis Leperdi
- Andrea Macri
- Florian Planker
- Roberto Radice
- Gianluigi Rosa
- Igor Stella
- Santino Stillitano
- Werner Winkler

Preliminaries

Pos	Team	Pld	W	OTW	OTL	L	GF	GA	GD	Pts	Qualification
1	Russia (H)	3	2	0	1	0	11	4	+7	7	Semifinals
2	United States	3	2	0	0	1	9	3	+6	6	Semifinals
3	Italy	3	1	0	0	2	3	13	−10	3	5–8th place semifinals
4	South Korea	3	0	1	0	2	4	7	−3	2	5–8th place semifinals

Source: Sochi 2014
(H) Host

8 March 2014; 16:30	United States	5–1 (1–0, 1–0, 3–1)	Italy	Shayba Arena; Attendance: 3,617

Game reference

Steve Cash
Jen Lee
Goalies
Santino Stillitano
Referee:
(Canada) Paul Boese
Linesmen:
(Canada) Matthew Clark
(Russia) Dmitriy Klochkov

Farmer (Landeros, Chace) (PP) – 13:45	1–0
Roybal (Farmer) – 26:12	2–0
Sweeney – 33:04	3–0
Roybal (Pauls, Landeros) – 40:18	4–0
	4–1	43:34 – Planker (Cavaliere)
Schaus (Landeros) – 44:55	5–1

8 min
Penalties
10 min
19
Shots
12

9 March 2014; 20:00	Russia	7–0 (1–0, 4–0, 2–0)	Italy	Shayba Arena; Attendance: 5,638

Game reference

Vladimir Kamantsev
Goalies
Santino Stillitano
Gabriele Araudo
Referee:
(United States) Johnathan Morrison
Linesmen:
(Netherlands) Louis Beelen
(Poland) Tomasz Heltman

Popov (Selyukin) – 12:04	1–0
Amosov (Petrov) – 18:30	2–0
Dvinyaninov (Popov, Varlakov) – 22:01	3–0
Dvinyaninov (Popov, Varlakov) – 26:25	4–0
Litvinenko (Petrov, Lysov) – 28:49	5–0
Dvinyaninov (Petrov) (PP) – 31:20	6–0
Volkov (Dvinyaninov, Litvinenko) (PP) – 38:38	7–0

2 min
Penalties
4 min
10
Shots
13

11 March 2014; 09:30	South Korea	1–2 (0–1, 0–0, 1–1)	Italy	Shayba Arena; Attendance: 3,889

Game reference

Yu Man-gyun
Goalies
Gabriele Araudo
Referee:
(Canada) Paul Boese
Linesmen:
(Russia) Dmitriy Klochkov
(Norway) Espen Nyberget

	0–1	09:55 – Macri (Leperdi)
Jung – 35:06	1–1
	1–2	35:53 – Planker (Chiarotti)

2 min
Penalties
4 min
10
Shots
13

5–8 Classification Play-offs

12 March 2014; 16:00	Italy	3–2 OT (0–1, 0–1, 2–0) (OT: 1–0)	Sweden	Shayba Arena; Attendance: 4,720

Game reference

Santino Stillitano
Gabriele Araudo
Goalies
Ulf Nilsson
Referee:
(United States) Derek Berkebile
Linesmen:
(Poland) Tomasz Heltman
(Czech Republic) Leon Wesley

	0–1	13:58 – Kasperi (From)
	0–2	29:00 – Kasperi (Ingvarsson, Holm) (PP2)
Rosa (Planker) – 33:00	1–2
Leperdi (Cavaliere, Rosa) (EA) – 42:45	2–2
Cavaliere (Planker) – 50:28	3–2

4 min
Penalties
4 min
34
Shots
11

5th Place Game

14 March 2014; 20:00	Czech Republic	3–0 (0–0, 0–0, 3–0)	Italy	Shayba Arena; Attendance: 5,398

Game reference

Michal Vápenka
Goalies
Gabriele Araudo
Referee:
(Norway) Petter Hegle
Linesmen:
(South Korea) Chae Young-jin
(Russia) Dmitriy Klochkov

Šafránek (Kubeš, Motyčka) (PP) – 31:34	1–0
Geier – 43:04	2–0
Geier (Kubeš) (ENG) – 44:48	3–0

4 min
Penalties
2 min
11
Shots
18

== See also ==
- Italy at the Paralympics
- Italy at the 2014 Winter Olympics
