= Italy at the 2026 Winter Paralympics =

Italian delegation to sporting event

- IPC code: ITA
- Website: www.comitatoparalimpico.it

in Milan and Cortina d'Ampezzo, Italy 4 March 2026 – 15 March 2026
- Medals Ranked 4th: Gold 7 Silver 7 Bronze 2 Total 16

Winter Paralympics appearances (overview)
- 1980; 1984; 1988; 1992; 1994; 1998; 2002; 2006; 2010; 2014; 2018; 2022; 2026

Italy was represented at the 2026 Winter Paralympics in Milan and Cortina d'Ampezzo, Italy, from 6 to 15 March 2026. Italy hosted the competition and was the thirteenth consecutive appearance at the Winter Paralympic Games for this country since the event in 1980.

Italy, including the 2026 Milano-Cortina Paralympics, has won a total of 89 medals: 23 gold, 32 silver, and 34 bronze.

== Medalists ==
The following Italy competitors won medals at the games. In the discipline sections below, the medalists' names are bolded.

Medal	Name	Sport	Event	Date
Gold	Emanuel Perathoner	Para snowboard	Men's snowboard cross, SB-LL2	8 March
Gold	Chiara Mazzel; Guide: Nicola Cotti Cottini	Para alpine skiing	Women's super-G, visually impaired	9 March
Gold	Giacomo Bertagnolli; Guide: Andrea Ravelli	Para alpine skiing	Men's super combined, visually impaired	10 March
Gold	Jacopo Luchini	Para snowboard	Men's banked slalom, SB-UL	13 March
Gold	Emanuel Perathoner	Para snowboard	Men's banked slalom, SB-LL2	13 March
Gold	René de Silvestro	Para alpine skiing	Men's giant slalom, sitting	13 March
Gold	Giacomo Bertagnolli; Guide: Andrea Ravelli	Para alpine skiing	Men's slalom, visually impaired	15 March
Silver	Chiara Mazzel; Guide: Nicola Cotti Cottini	Para alpine skiing	Women's downhill, visually impaired	7 March
Silver	Giacomo Bertagnolli; Guide: Andrea Ravelli	Para alpine skiing	Men's super-G, visually impaired	9 March
Silver	Chiara Mazzel; Guide: Nicola Cotti Cottini	Para alpine skiing	Women's super combined, visually impaired	10 March
Silver	Federico Pelizzari	Para alpine skiing	Men's super combined, sitting	10 March
Silver	René de Silvestro	Para alpine skiing	Men's super combined, sitting	10 March
Silver	Chiara Mazzel; Guide: Fabrizio Casal	Para alpine skiing	Women's giant slalom, visually impaired	12 March
Silver	Giacomo Bertagnolli; Guide: Andrea Ravelli	Para alpine skiing	Men's giant slalom, visually impaired	13 March
Bronze	Giacomo Bertagnolli; Guide: Andrea Ravelli	Para alpine skiing	Men's downhill, visually impaired	7 March
Bronze	Giuseppe Romele	Para cross-country skiing	Men's 20 kilometre, sitting	15 March

Medals by sport
**Sport**	1st place, gold medalist(s)	2nd place, silver medalist(s)	3rd place, bronze medalist(s)	**Total**
Alpine skiing	4	7	1	**12**
Para snowboard	3	0	0	**3**
Cross-country skiing	0	0	1	**1**
Total	7	7	2	16

Medals by gender
**Gender**	1st place, gold medalist(s)	2nd place, silver medalist(s)	3rd place, bronze medalist(s)	**Total**
Female	1	3	0	**4**
Male	6	4	2	**12**
Mixed	0	0	0	**0**
Total	7	7	2	16

Medals by date
**Day**	**Date**	1st place, gold medalist(s)	2nd place, silver medalist(s)	3rd place, bronze medalist(s)	Total
Day 1	7 March	0	1	1	2
Day 2	8 March	1	0	0	1
Day 3	9 March	1	1	0	2
Day 4	10 March	1	3	0	4
Day 5	11 March	0	0	0	0
Day 6	12 March	0	1	0	1
Day 7	13 March	3	1	0	4
Day 8	14 March	0	0	0	0
Day 9	15 March	1	0	1	2
Total		7	7	2	16

== Competitors ==
The following is the list of number of competitors participating at the Games per sport/discipline.

Sport	Men	Women	Total
Para alpine skiing	5 + 1 guide	2 + 2 guides	7 + 3 guides
Para biathlon	2	0	2
Para cross-country skiing	4	0	4
Para ice hockey	17	0	17
Para snowboard	5	0	5
Wheelchair curling	4	3	7
Total	37 + 1 guide	5 + 2 guides	42 + 3 guides

== Para ice hockey ==
Italy qualified a para ice hockey team by virtue of being the games hosts.

Summary

Key:

- OT – Overtime
- GWS – Match decided by penalty-shootout

Team	Event	Group stage				Semifinal / Cl.	Final / BM / Pl.	
Team	Event	Opposition Score	Opposition Score	Opposition Score	Rank	Opposition Score	Opposition Score	Rank
Italy	Tournament	United States; L 1–14	China; L 1–11	Germany; W 2–1	3	Japan; W 5–0	Germany; W 5–2	5

Roster

Head coach:

Group play

Pos	Team	Pld	W	OTW	OTL	L	GF	GA	GD	Pts	Qualification
1	United States	3	3	0	0	0	34	2	+32	9	Semifinals
2	China	3	2	0	0	1	24	8	+16	6	Semifinals
3	Italy (H)	3	1	0	0	2	4	26	−22	3	5–8th place semifinals
4	Germany	3	0	0	0	3	1	27	−26	0	5–8th place semifinals

Source: Milano Cortina 2026
(H) Host

7 March 2026; 17:05	United States	14–1 (3–1, 7–0, 4–0)	Italy	PalaItalia, Milan; Attendance: 8,992

Game reference

Jen Lee
Goalies
Julian Kasslatter
Santino Stillitano
Referee:
(Canada) Patrick Myers
Linesmen:
(Norway) Marius Hermansen Oswold
(Sweden) Andreas Lunden

	0–1	00:25 – Depaoli (Rosa)
Eustace (Dodson) – 03:46	1–1
Bolton (Farmer, Pauls) – 09:00	2–1
Farmer (Grove, Beasley) – 11:18	3–1
Bolton (Pauls, Grove) – 16:39	4–1
McKee (Roybal, Wallace) – 17:54	5–1
Farmer (Pauls) – 18:29	6–1
Beasley (Farmer) – 18:57	7–1
Grove (Nichols, Roybal) – 20:18	8–1
Farmer (Eustace) – 22:25	9–1
Farmer (Pauls) – 23:16	10–1
Jones (Grove, Roybal) – 33:40	11–1
Nichols (Roybal, Grove) – 34:12	12–1
Wallace (Dodson, Cunningham) – 35:44	13–1
Eustace (Grove, Dodson) – 42:46	14–1

2 min
Penalties
4 min
53
Shots
2

9 March 2026; 10:05	China	11–1 (1–1, 6–0, 4–0)	Italy	PalaItalia, Milan; Attendance: 4,500

Game reference

Wang Wei
Goalies
Santino Stillitano
Julian Kasslatter
Referee:
(United States) Bobby Esposito
Linesmen:
(Czech Republic) Pavel Blažek
(Finland) Lari Niittylä

Tian (Lyu, Song) – 12:22	1–0
	1–1	13:07 – Landeros (Kalegaris, Kafmann)
Qiu (Shen, Zhu) – 19:09	2–1
Wang Z. (Li) – 19:55	3–1
Tian (Shen) – 21:01	4–1
Tian (Shen) – 23:10	5–1
Wang Z. (Lyu, Song) – 24:08	6–1
Shen (Tian) – 26:02	7–1
Wang J. (Wang Z.) (PP) – 31:46	8–1
Song (Che) – 33:15	9–1
Wang Z. (Shen, Tian) – 34:47	10–1
Li (Shen, Song) (PP) – 44:27	11–1

4 min
Penalties
6 min
39
Shots
8

10 March 2026; 10:05	Italy	2–1 (1–1, 1–0, 0–0)	Germany	PalaItalia, Milan; Attendance: 4,873

Game reference

Julian Kasslatter
Goalies
Simon Kunst
Referee:
(Czech Republic) Jan Vaněk
Linesmen:
(Czech Republic) Pavel Blažek
(Italy) Alexander Wiest

	0–1	02:40 – Bußmann (Kuhli-Lauenstein, Stumpe)
Larch (Rosa, Landeros) (PP) – 11:55	1–1
Landeros (Kalegaris, Macri) – 18:31	2–1

4 min
Penalties
8 min
24
Shots
12

5–8th place semifinal

12 March 2026; 19:05	Italy	5–0 (1–0, 3–0, 1–0)	Japan	PalaItalia, Milan; Attendance: 3,634

Game reference

Santino Stillitano
Goalies
Wataru Horie
Referee:
(Canada) Kevin Webinger
Linesmen:
(Czech Republic) Pavel Blažek
(Finland) Lari Niittylä

Landeros (Larch, Rosa) (PP) – 06:32	1–0
Landeros (Macri, Larch) – 19:37	2–0
Radice (Rosa) – 26:28	3–0
Kalegaris (Depaoli) – 28:01	4–0
Landeros (Torella) – 44:33	5–0

6 min
Penalties
10 min
29
Shots
13

Fifth place game

14 March 2026; 16:05	Italy	5–2 (0–1, 2–1, 3–0)	Germany	PalaItalia, Milan; Attendance: 6,495

Game reference

Santino Stillitano
Goalies
Simon Kunst
Referee:
(Canada) Matthew Fergenbaum
Linesmen:
(Serbia) Tibor Fazekas
(Norway) Marius Hermansen Oswold

	0–1	09:09 – Hering (Schrader, Rädler) (PP)
Landeros (Enderle, Rosa) – 17:54	1–1
	1–2	21:08 – Hering
Depaoli (Rosa) (PP) – 26:56	2–2
Landeros (Depaoli, Rosa) – 37:05	3–2
Rosa (Macri, Kalegaris) – 38:05	4–2
Rosa (Larch, Macri) – 42:53	5–2

18 min
Penalties
24 min
25
Shots
11

== Wheelchair curling ==
Summary

Team	Event	Group stage										Semifinal	Final / BM	
Team	Event	Opposition Score	Opposition Score	Opposition Score	Opposition Score	Opposition Score	Opposition Score	Opposition Score	Opposition Score	Opposition Score	Rank	Opposition Score	Opposition Score	Rank
Egidio Marchese; Fabrizio Bich; Matteo Ronzani; Angela Menardi; Giuliana Turra	Mixed team	CAN; L 8–9	CHN; L 3–5	USA; L 1–10	SVK; W 10–0	GBR; W 8–6	NOR; L 3–9	SWE; W 4–3	LAT; W 10–5	KOR; L 5–6	6	Did not advance		
Orietta Bertò; Paolo Ioriatti	Mixed doubles	KOR; W 7–5	EST; L 4–6	CHN; L 7–8	JPN; L 5–6	LAT; L 4–9	USA; L 5–7	GBR; W 11–10	—N/a		8	Did not advance		

=== Mixed tournament ===
Final Round Robin Standings
Team	Skip	Pld	W	L	W–L	PF	PA	EW	EL	BE	SE	S%	DSC	Qualification
Canada	Mark Ideson	9	9	0	–	71	36	36	26	2	19	68.2%	84.488	Playoffs
China	Wang Haitao	9	8	1	–	76	42	38	26	1	15	68.3%	83.350	Playoffs
Sweden	Viljo Petersson-Dahl	9	5	4	1–0	47	48	31	31	6	13	62.8%	98.125	Playoffs
South Korea	Yang Hui-tae	9	5	4	0–1	55	48	36	32	1	17	64.6%	90.525	Playoffs
Norway	Jostein Stordahl	9	4	5	1–0	41	55	28	31	2	12	58.3%	130.863	
Italy	Egidio Marchese	9	4	5	0–1	52	53	32	27	0	15	60.6%	107.831	
Latvia	Ojārs Briedis	9	3	6	2–0	45	67	27	33	0	12	50.2%	113.381	
Slovakia	Radoslav Ďuriš	9	3	6	1–1	42	56	26	37	1	13	51.9%	117.688	
United States	Sean O'Neill	9	3	6	0–2	54	52	34	32	0	14	58.3%	72.156	
Great Britain	Hugh Nibloe	9	1	8	–	40	66	26	39	0	7	55.7%	129.675	

Source: Official website

Round robin
Italy had a bye in draws 1, 6 and 9.

Draw 2
Saturday, March 7, 18:35

Sheet A	1	2	3	4	5	6	7	8	Final
Italy (Marchese) 🔨	0	2	0	0	2	2	1	1	8
Canada (Ideson)	4	0	3	2	0	0	0	0	9

Draw 3
Sunday, March 8, 9:35

Sheet B	1	2	3	4	5	6	7	8	Final
Italy (Marchese)	0	1	0	0	0	0	2	X	3
China (Wang) 🔨	1	0	1	1	1	1	0	X	5

Draw 4
Sunday, March 8, 18:35

Sheet A	1	2	3	4	5	6	7	8	Final
United States (O'Neill) 🔨	3	0	4	1	1	1	X	X	10
Italy (Marchese)	0	1	0	0	0	0	X	X	1

Draw 5
Monday, March 9, 9:35

Sheet D	1	2	3	4	5	6	7	8	Final
Slovakia (Ďuriš)	0	0	0	0	0	0	X	X	0
Italy (Marchese) 🔨	2	2	2	1	2	1	X	X	10

Draw 7
Tuesday, March 10, 9:35

Sheet B	1	2	3	4	5	6	7	8	Final
Great Britain (Nibloe) 🔨	0	3	0	0	2	0	1	X	6
Italy (Marchese)	1	0	1	3	0	3	0	X	8

Draw 8
Tuesday, March 10, 18:35

Sheet C	1	2	3	4	5	6	7	8	Final
Italy (Marchese)	0	0	1	0	2	0	0	X	3
Norway (Stordahl) 🔨	2	3	0	3	0	0	1	X	9

Draw 10
Wednesday, March 11, 20:05

Sheet A	1	2	3	4	5	6	7	8	Final
Italy (Marchese)	0	1	1	0	0	1	0	1	4
Sweden (Petersson-Dahl) 🔨	0	0	0	0	3	0	0	0	3

Draw 11
Thursday, March 12, 13:35

Sheet D	1	2	3	4	5	6	7	8	Final
Italy (Marchese) 🔨	2	0	1	0	2	3	2	X	10
Latvia (Briedis)	0	3	0	2	0	0	0	X	5

Draw 12
Thursday, March 12, 18:35

Sheet C	1	2	3	4	5	6	7	8	Final
South Korea (Yang)	0	3	0	0	1	1	0	1	6
Italy (Marchese) 🔨	2	0	2	0	0	0	1	0	5

=== Mixed doubles ===
Final Round Robin Standings
Team	Athletes	Pld	W	L	W–L	PF	PA	EW	EL	BE	SE	S%	DSC	Qualification
China	Wang Meng / Yang Jinqiao	7	6	1	–	66	32	32	21	0	14	64.9%	106.033	Playoffs
United States	Laura Dwyer / Stephen Emt	7	4	3	1–1	43	43	25	27	0	9	53.4%	89.717	Playoffs
South Korea	Baek Hye-jin / Lee Yong-suk	7	4	3	1–1	58	26	30	19	0	17	59.9%	142.058	Playoffs
Latvia	Poļina Rožkova / Agris Lasmans	7	4	3	1–1	46	45	28	25	0	12	48.5%	150.675	Playoffs
Great Britain	Jo Butterfield / Jason Kean	7	3	4	1–0	47	56	25	29	0	8	51.5%	95.075	
Japan	Aki Ogawa / Yoji Nakajima	7	3	4	0–1	30	53	19	30	0	8	49.0%	88.067	
Estonia	Katlin Riidebach / Ain Villau	7	2	5	1–0	31	58	22	28	0	9	47.6%	98.233	
Italy	Orietta Bertò / Paolo Ioriatti	7	2	5	0–1	43	51	28	30	0	11	55.6%	73.700	

Source: Official website

Round robin

Draw 1
Wednesday, March 4, 19:05

Sheet A	1	2	3	4	5	6	7	8	Final
Italy (Bertò / Ioriatti)	1	2	1	0	1	1	1	0	7
South Korea (Baek / Lee) 🔨	0	0	0	4	0	0	0	1	5

Draw 2
Thursday, March 5, 10:05

Sheet B	1	2	3	4	5	6	7	8	Final
Estonia (Riidebach / Villau) 🔨	1	0	1	1	1	1	1	0	6
Italy (Bertò / Ioriatti)	0	1	0	0	0	0	0	3	4

Draw 3
Thursday, March 5, 19:05

Sheet D	1	2	3	4	5	6	7	8	EE	Final
Italy (Bertò / Ioriatti) 🔨	3	0	0	1	2	0	1	0	0	7
China (Wang / Yang)	0	1	2	0	0	3	0	1	1	8

Draw 4
Friday, March 6, 9:05

Sheet A	1	2	3	4	5	6	7	8	Final
Japan (Ogawa / Nakajima) 🔨	2	2	1	0	0	0	0	1	6
Italy (Bertò / Ioriatti)	0	0	0	1	1	1	2	0	5

Draw 5
Saturday, March 7, 14:35

Sheet C	1	2	3	4	5	6	7	8	Final
Italy (Bertò / Ioriatti) 🔨	2	0	1	0	1	0	0	0	4
Latvia (Rožkova / Lasmans)	0	3	0	2	0	2	1	1	9

Draw 6
Sunday, March 8, 14:35

Sheet D	1	2	3	4	5	6	7	8	Final
United States (Dwyer / Emt)	0	4	0	1	0	0	1	1	7
Italy (Bertò / Ioriatti) 🔨	1	0	1	0	2	1	0	0	5

Draw 7
Monday, March 9, 14:35

Sheet B	1	2	3	4	5	6	7	8	EE	Final
Italy (Bertò / Ioriatti) 🔨	4	1	0	2	0	3	0	0	1	11
Great Britain (Butterfield / Kean)	0	0	2	0	2	0	3	3	0	10

== See also ==
- Italy at the Winter Paralympics
