= Alpine skiing at the 1988 Winter Paralympics – Men's downhill B3 =

Men's downhill B3 at the IV Paralympic Winter Games
- Paralympic Alpine Skiing
- Venue: Innsbruck
- Dates: January 1988
- Competitors: 6 from 3 nations

Medalists
| 1st place, gold medalist(s) | | Bruno Oberhammer | Italy |
| 2nd place, silver medalist(s) | | Uli Rompel | Canada |
| 3rd place, bronze medalist(s) | | Josef Erlacher | Italy |

The men's downhill B3 was one of the events held in Alpine skiing at the 1988 Winter Paralympics in Innsbruck.

There were 6 competitors in the final.

Italy's Bruno Oberhammer set a time of 49.48, taking the gold medal.

== Results ==
=== Final ===
| Rank | Athlete | Time |
|---|---|---|
| 1st place, gold medalist(s) | Bruno Oberhammer (ITA) | 49.48 |
| 2nd place, silver medalist(s) | Uli Rompel (CAN) | 49.68 |
| 3rd place, bronze medalist(s) | Josef Erlacher (ITA) | 52.72 |
| 4 | Tim Bachofer (USA) | 54.54 |
| | Brian Santos (USA) | DNS |
| | Manfred Perfler (ITA) | DNF |
