= Italy at the 1984 Winter Paralympics =

- IPC code: ITA
- NPC: Italian Paralympic Committee
- Competitors: 7 (7 men and 0 women)
- Medals Ranked 13th: Gold 0 Silver 0 Bronze 1 Total 1

Winter Paralympics appearances (overview)
- 1980; 1984; 1988; 1992; 1994; 1998; 2002; 2006; 2010; 2014; 2018; 2022; 2026

Italy competed at the 1984 Winter Paralympics in Innsbruck, Austria. 7 competitors from Italy won 1 medal including 0 gold, 0 silver and 1 bronze and finished 13th in the medal table.

== Team ==
The following athletes represented Italy at the 1984 Winter Paralympics:

- Maurizio Cagol
- Franz Gatscher
- Paolo Lorenzini
- Bruno Oberhammer
- Karl Schmuck
- Riccardo Tomasini
- Hubert Tscholl

== Alpine skiing ==
One athlete won a medal:

- (bronze) Bruno Oberhammer, Men's Alpine Combination B2

== Cross-country ==
No medals were won in the cross-country events.

== See also ==
- Italy at the Paralympics
- Italy at the 1984 Winter Olympics
