= Alpine skiing at the 2010 Winter Paralympics – Women's super-G =

Women's super-G at the X Paralympic Winter Games
- Paralympic alpine skiing
- Venue: Whistler Blackcomb
- Dates: March 19, 2010; March 20, 2010

The women's super-G competition of the Vancouver 2010 Paralympics was held at Whistler Blackcomb in Whistler, British Columbia. The competition was rescheduled to Friday, March 19, and Saturday, March 20, due to weather conditions.

== Visually impaired ==
In the super-G visually impaired, the athlete with a visual impairment has a sighted guide. The two skiers are considered a team, and dual medals are awarded.

Rank	Bib	Name	Country	Time	Difference
1st place, gold medalist(s)	5	Henrieta Farkasova; Guide: Natalia Subrtova	Slovakia	1:33.81	
2nd place, silver medalist(s)	4	Viviane Forest; Guide: Lindsay Debou	Canada	1:37.54	+3.73
3rd place, bronze medalist(s)	7	Anna Kuliskova; Guide: Michaela Hubacova	Czech Republic	1:38.02	+4.21
4	6	Danelle Umstead; Guide: Rob Umstead	United States	1:40.62	+6.81
5	9	Natasha de Troyer; Guide: Diego van de Voorde	Belgium	1:44.03	+10.22
6	2	Anna Cohi Fornell; Guide: Raquel Garcia Borreguero	Spain	1:46.12	+12.31
7	1	Melissa Perrine; Guide: Andrew Bor	Australia	1:46.35	+12.54
8	10	Caitlin Sarubbi; Guide: Gwynn Watkins	United States	1:50.33	+16.52
	3	Sabine Gasteiger; Guide: Stefan Schoner	Austria	DNS	
	8	Alexandra Frantseva; Guide: Polina Popova	Russia	DNS	

== Sitting ==
Rank	Bib	Name	Country	Time	Difference
1st place, gold medalist(s)	7	Claudia Loesch	Austria	1:33.89	
2nd place, silver medalist(s)	1	Alana Nichols	United States	1:36.68	+2.79
3rd place, bronze medalist(s)	2	Anna Schaffelhuber	Germany	1:38.25	+4.36
4	4	Laurie Stephens	United States	1:38.38	+4.49
5	6	Stephani Victor	United States	1:40.36	+6.47
6	3	Tatsuko Aoki	Japan	1:42.72	+8.83
7	5	Daila Dameno	Italy	1:51.91	+18.02
	8	Kuniko Obinata	Japan	DNS	

== Standing ==
Rank	Bib	Name	Country	Time	Difference
1st place, gold medalist(s)	15	Lauren Woolstencroft	Canada	1:26.46	
2nd place, silver medalist(s)	7	Melania Corradini	Italy	1:31.92	+5.46
3rd place, bronze medalist(s)	1	Andrea Rothfuss	Germany	1:32.47	+6.01
4	14	Solène Jambaqué	France	1:32.82	+6.36
5	2	Iveta Chlebakova	Slovakia	1:35.11	+8.65
6	3	Petra Smarzova	Slovakia	1:36.09	+9.63
7	5	Karolina Wisniewska	Canada	1:36.22	+9.76
8	12	Marie Bochet	France	1:36.48	+10.02
9	11	Allison Jones	United States	1:38.84	+12.38
10	6	Inga Medvedeva	Russia	1:38.97	+12.51
11	9	Katja Saarinen	Finland	1:44.64	+18.18
12	8	Nathalie Tyack	France	1:47.13	+20.67
13	13	Marina Perterer	Austria	1:48.12	+21.66
14	16	Melanie Schwartz	Canada	2:11.23	+44.77
	4	Arly Fogarty	Canada	DNS	
	10	Andrea Dziewior	Canada	DNS	

== See also ==
- Alpine skiing at the 2010 Winter Olympics
