= Italy at the 1980 Winter Paralympics =

- IPC code: ITA
- NPC: Italian Paralympic Committee
- Competitors: 1 (1 man and 0 women) in 1 sport and 2 events
- Medals Ranked 11th: Gold 0 Silver 0 Bronze 0 Total 0

Winter Paralympics appearances (overview)
- 1980; 1984; 1988; 1992; 1994; 1998; 2002; 2006; 2010; 2014; 2018; 2022; 2026

Italy competed at the 1980 Winter Paralympics in Geilo, Norway. One competitor from Italy competed in two events in alpine skiing. He did not win any medals and Italy finished last in the medal table.

== Alpine skiing ==
Maurizio Cagol competed in the Men's Giant Slalom 1A and Men's Slalom 1A events. In the Giant Slalom 1A event he finished in 32nd place and in the Slalom 1A event he finished in 22nd place.

== See also ==
- Italy at the Paralympics
- Italy at the 1980 Winter Olympics
