= Italy at the 1988 Winter Paralympics =

- IPC code: ITA
- NPC: Italian Paralympic Committee
- Website: www.comitatoparalimpico.it

in Innsbruck, Austria
- Competitors: 24 (22 men and 2 women) in 2 sports
- Medals Ranked 10th: Gold 3 Silver 0 Bronze 6 Total 9

Winter Paralympics appearances (overview)
- 1980; 1984; 1988; 1992; 1994; 1998; 2002; 2006; 2010; 2014; 2018; 2022; 2026

Italy competed at the 1988 Winter Paralympics in Innsbruck, Austria. 24 competitors from Austria won nine medals including three gold, zero silver and six bronze and finished 10th in the medal table.

== Alpine skiing ==
- (gold) Bruno Oberhammer, Men's Downhill B3
- (gold) Bruno Oberhammer, Men's Giant Slalom B3
- (bronze) Carmela Cantisani, Women's Downhill B1
- (bronze) Josef Erlacher, Men's Downhill B3
- (bronze) Antonio Marziali, Men's Downhill B2
- (bronze) Manfred Perfler, Men's Giant Slalom B3

== Biathlon ==
Italy did not compete in biathlon at the 1988 Winter Paralympics.

== Cross-country ==
- (gold) Paolo Lorenzini, Men's Long Distance 30 km B3
- (bronze) Paolo Lorenzini, Men's Short Distance 15 km B3
- (bronze) Paolo Lorenzini, Riccardo Tomasini, Hubert Tscholl, Erich Walch, Men's 4x10 km Relay B1-3

== Ice sledge speed racing ==
Italy did not compete in ice sledge speed racing at the 1988 Winter Paralympics.

== See also ==
- Italy at the Paralympics
- Italy at the 1988 Winter Olympics
