= Italy at the 2002 Winter Paralympics =

- IPC code: ITA
- NPC: Comitato Italiano Paralimpico
- Website: www.comitatoparalimpico.it (in Italian)

in Salt Lake City
- Competitors: 14
- Medals Ranked 11th: Gold 3 Silver 3 Bronze 3 Total 9

Winter Paralympics appearances (overview)
- 1980; 1984; 1988; 1992; 1994; 1998; 2002; 2006; 2010; 2014; 2018; 2022; 2026

Italy competed at the 2002 Winter Paralympics in Salt Lake City, United States. 14 competitors from Italy won 9 medals including 3 gold, 3 silver and 3 bronze and finished 11th in the medal table.

== See also ==
- Italy at the Paralympics
- Italy at the 2002 Winter Olympics
