= Italy at the 1992 Winter Paralympics =

- IPC code: ITA
- NPC: Comitato Italiano Paralimpico
- Website: www.comitatoparalimpico.it (in Italian)

in Tignes-Albertville
- Competitors: 27
- Medals Ranked 16th: Gold 0 Silver 1 Bronze 3 Total 4

Winter Paralympics appearances (overview)
- 1980; 1984; 1988; 1992; 1994; 1998; 2002; 2006; 2010; 2014; 2018; 2022; 2026

Italy competed at the 1992 Winter Paralympics in Tignes/Albertville, France. 27 competitors from Italy won 4 medals, 1 silver, and 3 bronze, and finished joint 16th in the medal table with Spain.

== See also ==
- Italy at the Paralympics
- Italy at the 1992 Winter Olympics
