= Alpine skiing at the 1988 Winter Paralympics – Men's downhill B2 =

Men's downhill B2 at the IV Paralympic Winter Games
- Paralympic Alpine Skiing
- Venue: Innsbruck
- Dates: January 1988
- Competitors: 14 from 8 nations

Medalists
| 1st place, gold medalist(s) | | Odo Habermann | Austria |
| 2nd place, silver medalist(s) | | Stephane Saas | France |
| 3rd place, bronze medalist(s) | | Antonio Marziali | Italy |

The men's downhill B2 was one of the events held in Alpine skiing at the 1988 Winter Paralympics in Innsbruck.

There were 14 competitors in the final.

Austria's Odo Habermann set a time of 48.84, taking the gold medal.

== Results ==
=== Final ===
| Rank | Athlete | Time |
|---|---|---|
| 1st place, gold medalist(s) | Odo Habermann (AUT) | 48.84 |
| 2nd place, silver medalist(s) | Stephane Saas (FRA) | 50.53 |
| 3rd place, bronze medalist(s) | Antonio Marziali (ITA) | 55.89 |
| 4 | Jim Chalfant (USA) | 56.88 |
| 5 | Lars Nielsen (DEN) | 57.17 |
| 6 | Gerhard Pscheider (AUT) | 57.56 |
| 7 | Ingvar Krutroeck (SWE) | 1:00.65 |
| 8 | Christopher Mairs (GBR) | 1:24.36 |
| | Brian Hubbard (USA) | DNF |
| | Lars-Goran Nilsson (SWE) | DNF |
| | David Ballman (USA) | DNF |
| | Hans Ewald Grill (AUT) | DNF |
| | Hubert Perfler (ITA) | DNF |
| | Pierre de Coster (BEL) | DNF |
