= Manfred Perfler =

Italian para-alpine skier (born 1963)

Personal information
- Born: December 21, 1963

Sport
- Country: Italy
- Sport: Paralympic alpine skiing
Medal record
Paralympic Games
Bronze medal – third place	1988 Innsbruck	Giant Slalom B3
Bronze medal – third place	1994 Lillehammer	Slalom B3

Manfred Perfler is an Italian para-alpine skier.

He won the bronze medal at the Men's Giant Slalom B3 event at the 1988 Winter Paralympics and at the Men's Slalom B3 event at the 1994 Winter Paralympics. He also competed at the Men's Downhill B3 event but did not finish.
