= Italy at the Winter Paralympics =

Italian delegation to sporting event

- IPC code: ITA
- NPC: Comitato Italiano Paralimpico
- Website: Official website
- Medals Ranked 15th: Gold 23 Silver 32 Bronze 34 Total 89

Winter Paralympics appearances (overview)
- 1980; 1984; 1988; 1992; 1994; 1998; 2002; 2006; 2010; 2014; 2018; 2022; 2026

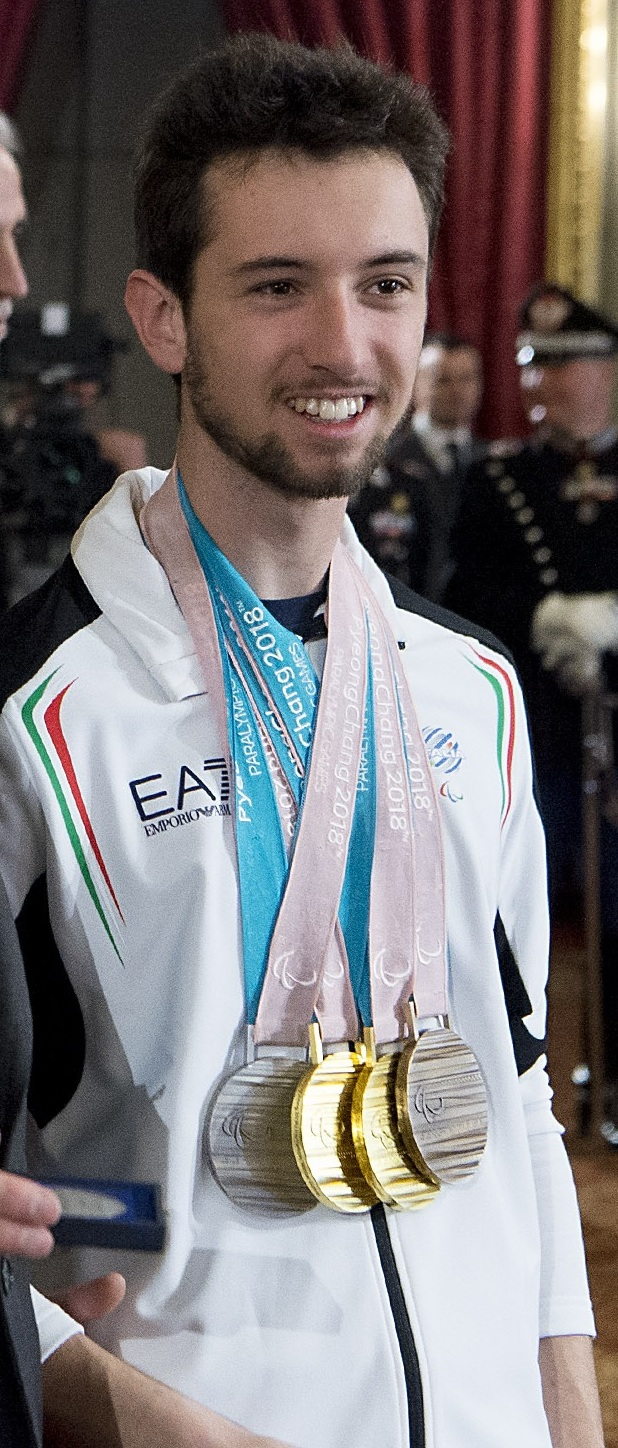
Giacomo Bertagnolli, 13 medals won at the Winter Paralympics.

Italy has sent delegations to the Winter Paralympics since the second edition in Geilo 1980, the International Paralympic Committee (IPC).

== Medal tables ==
Italy, including the 2026 Milano-Cortina Paralympics, has won a total of 89 medals: 23 gold, 32 silver, and 34 bronze.

Best rank in medal table

*Red border color indicates tournament was held on home soil.

Games	Athletes	Gold	Silver	Bronze	Total	Rank
(Norway) 1980 Geilo	1	0	0	0	0	—
(Austria) 1984 Innsbruck	7	0	0	1	1	13
(Austria) 1988 Innsbruck	24	3	0	6	9	10
(France) 1992 Tignes-Albertsville	27	0	1	3	4	16
(Norway) 1994 Lillehammer	24	0	7	6	13	17
(Japan) 1998 Nagano	21	3	4	3	10	12
(United States) 2002 Salt Lake City	14	3	3	3	9	11
(Italy) 2006 Turin	39	2	2	4	8	9
(Canada) 2010 Vancouver	35	1	3	3	7	11
(Russia) 2014 Sochi	34	0	0	0	0	—
(South Korea) 2018 Pyeongchang	25	2	2	1	5	12
(China) 2022 Beijing	32	2	3	2	7	11
(Italy) 2026 Milano-Cortina	42	7	7	2	16	4
(France) 2030 French Alps						
(United States) 2034 Utah						
Total		23	32	34	89	15

== Multiple medallists ==
These are official report of International Paralympic Committee. Athletes in bold are athletes who are still competing.

Still active

Updated to Milano Cortina 2026.

#	Athlete	Years (no. of games)	1st place, gold medalist(s)	2nd place, silver medalist(s)	3rd place, bronze medalist(s)	Total
1	**Giacomo Bertagnolli**	2018-2026 (3)	6	5	2	13
2	Bruno Oberhammer	1984-1998 (5)	3	5	4	12
3	Roland Ruepp	1998-2002 (2)	2	1	1	4
4	Angelo Zanotti	1998 (1)	2	0	0	2

== See also ==
- Italy at the Winter Olympics
- Italy at the Summer Olympics
