= Viviane Forest =

Canadian multi-sport Paralympian

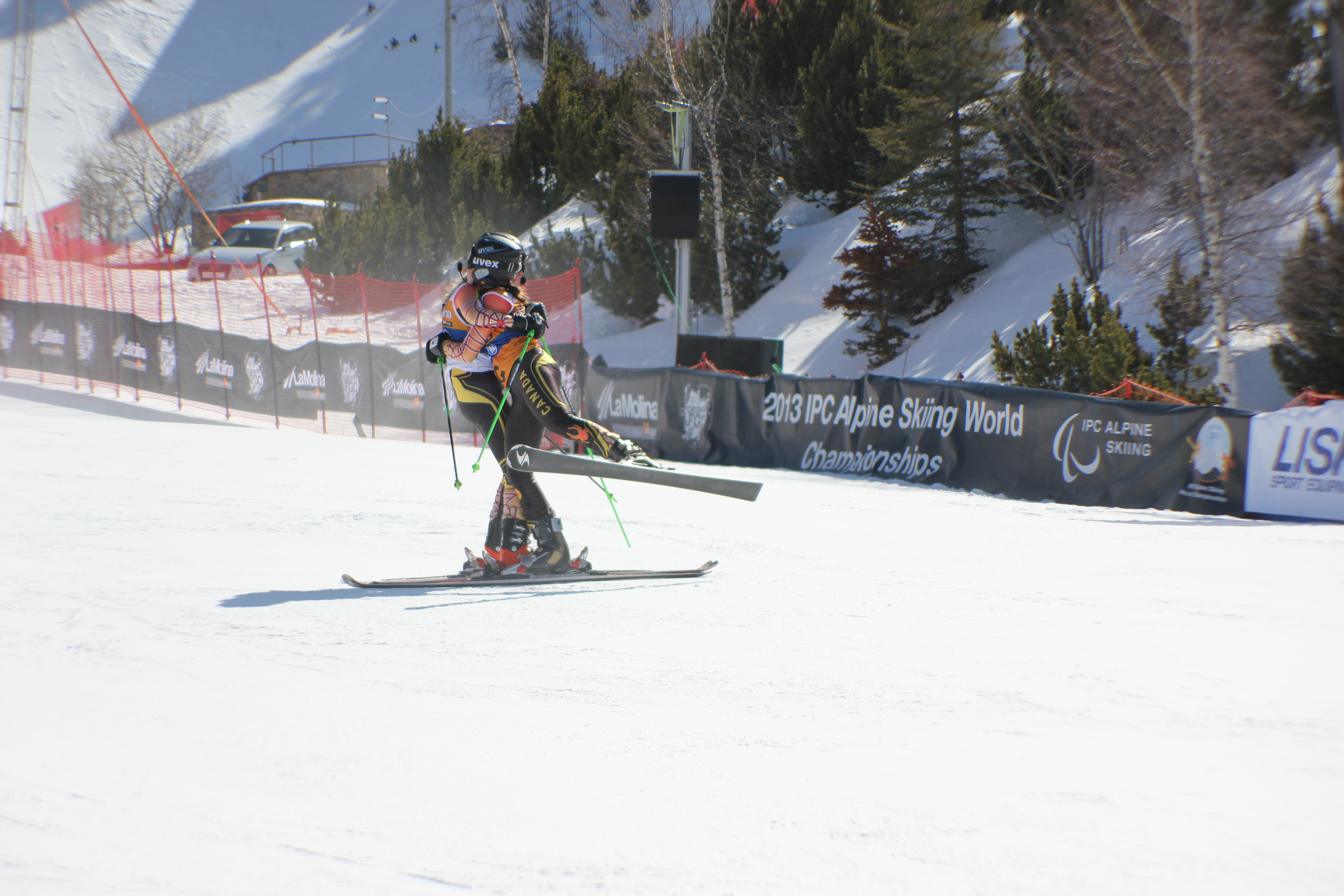
- 2013 IPC Alpine World Championships

Medal record

Representing Canada

Goalball

Paralympic Games
Gold medal – first place	2000 Sydney	Women's goalball
Gold medal – first place	2004 Athens	Women's goalball

Alpine skiing

Paralympic Games
Gold medal – first place	2010 Vancouver	Women's downhill (visually impaired)
Silver medal – second place	2010 Vancouver	Women's slalom (visually impaired)
Silver medal – second place	2010 Vancouver	Women's Super-G (visually impaired)
Silver medal – second place	2010 Vancouver	Women's combined (visually impaired)
Bronze medal – third place	2010 Vancouver	Women's giant slalom (visually impaired)

IPC Alpine Skiing World Championships
Silver medal – second place	2013 La Molina	Giant slalom, (visually impaired)
Bronze medal – third place	2013 La Molina	Slalom, (visually impaired)

Viviane Forest (born 14 May 1979) is a Canadian multi-sport Paralympic medallist. She was born and raised in Quebec, and currently resides in Edmonton, Alberta. She is the first Canadian Paralympian to win a gold medal at the Summer and Winter Paralympic Games.

== Early life ==
A native of Montreal who was born in Greenfield Park, Quebec with four percent of vision.

== Sporting career ==
Forest played on Canada's gold medal-winning goalball teams in Sydney and Athens in 2000 and 2004 respectively.

She won a silver at the 2010 Winter Paralympics in Vancouver for slalom (Visually Impaired), with a time of 2:01.45, 0.89 seconds behind the winner, Sabine Gasteiger of Austria.

She won a bronze in the 2010 Winter Paralympics for giant slalom for women's visually impaired.

She won gold at the 2010 Winter Paralympics in Whistler Creekside for Women's Visually Impaired Downhill. This made her the first para-athlete to win a gold in both the Winter and Summer Games.

Her skiing guide is Lindsay Debou. Their personal sponsors are The Weather Network and Fischer.

In 2013, Forest announced her retirement from the Paralympic Sport at the Sport Chek Para-Alpine Canadian Championships in Sun Peaks, British Columbia.

In 2019, she was named to the Canadian Paralympic Hall of Fame at the 2019 Induction.

== Results ==
B2 classified Canadian skier Viviane Forest and guide Chloe Lauzon-Gauthier in action at the IPC Alpine World Championships in 2013

Beyond the Paralympics, her results include:

2009 World IPC Championships-High 1 Korea

- Gold Medalist- Super-Combined
- Silver Medalist- Downhill
- Silver Medalist- Giant slalom
- Silver Medalist- Slalom
- Silver Medalist- SG

2009 World Cup Finals-Whistler, BC

- Gold Medalist- Giant slalom
- Gold Medalist- Downhill
- Silver Medalist- Super combined
- Silver Medalist- Super G
