= Danelle Umstead =

American para-alpine skier (born 1972)

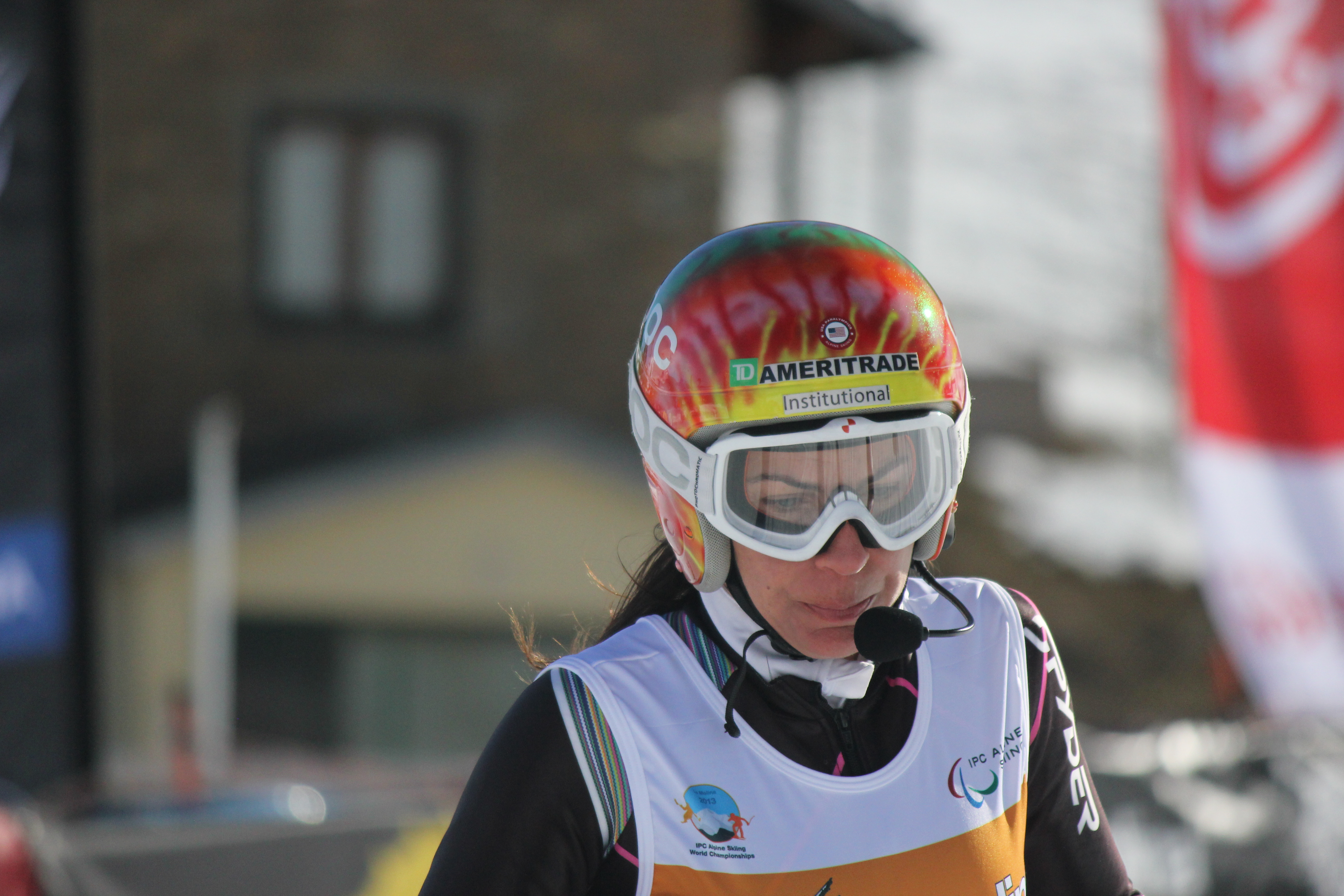

Personal information
- Born: February 15, 1972 (age 54) Taos, New Mexico

Skiing career
- Sport: Alpine skiing
- Disciplines: Umstead at the 2013 World Championships

Danelle D’Aquanni Umstead (born February 15, 1972) is an American alpine skier and Paralympian.

She is part of the US Paralympics team. She competed at the women's slalom, giant slalom, downhill, super-G and combined at the 2010 Winter Paralympics in Vancouver, with her husband Rob Umstead as her sighted guide. They took the bronze medal at the downhill and combined. She also competed in the 2014 Winter Paralympics in Sochi, winning a bronze medal in the super combined. She competed in the 2018 Winter Paralympics in Pyeongchang the downhill, slalom, giant slalom, super-g, and the super combined.

She has a genetic eye condition called retinitis pigmentosa.

On September 12, 2018, Umstead was announced as one of the celebrities being on season 27 of Dancing with the Stars. Her professional partner was Artem Chigvintsev.
