= Italy at the 2006 Winter Paralympics =

- IPC code: ITA
- NPC: Comitato Italiano Paralimpico
- Website: www.comitatoparalimpico.it (in Italian)

in Turin
- Competitors: 39 in 4 sports
- Medals Ranked 9th: Gold 2 Silver 2 Bronze 4 Total 8

Winter Paralympics appearances (overview)
- 1980; 1984; 1988; 1992; 1994; 1998; 2002; 2006; 2010; 2014; 2018; 2022; 2026

Italy was the host country of the ninth Winter Paralympics in Turin.

== Participation ==
Italy entered 39 athletes in the following sports:

- Alpine skiing: 10 male, 3 female
- Ice sledge hockey: 15 male
- Nordic skiing: 4 male, 2 female
- Wheelchair curling: 3 male, 2 female

== Medalist ==
| Medal | Name | Sport | Event | Date |
|---|---|---|---|---|
| Gold | Gianmaria Dal Maistro | Alpine skiing | Super-G, visually impaired | 14 March |
| Gold | Silvia Parente | Alpine skiing | Giant slalom, visually impaired | 17 March |
| Silver | Gianmaria Dal Maistro | Alpine skiing | Giant slalom, visually impaired | 17 March |
| Silver | Daila Dameno | Alpine skiing | Slalom, sitting | 19 March |
| Bronze | Silvia Parente | Alpine skiing | Downhill, visually impaired | 12 March |
| Bronze | Silvia Parente | Alpine skiing | Super-G, visually impaired | 14 March |
| Bronze | Daila Dameno | Alpine skiing | Giant slalom, sitting | 17 March |
| Bronze | Silvia Parente | Alpine skiing | Slalom, visually impaired | 19 March |

== See also ==
- 2006 Winter Paralympics
- Italy at the 2006 Winter Olympics
