= Antonio Marziali =

Italian para-alpine skier

Personal information
- Born: December 30, 1962 (age 63)

Sport
- Country: Italy
- Sport: Paralympic alpine skiing
Medal record
Paralympic Games
Bronze medal – third place	1988 Innsbruck	Downhill B2

Antonio Marziali is an Italian para-alpine skier.

He represented Italy at the 1988 Winter Paralympics and he won the bronze medal at the Downhill B2 event.
