= Italy at the 1998 Winter Paralympics =

- IPC code: ITA
- NPC: Comitato Italiano Paralimpico
- Website: www.comitatoparalimpico.it (in Italian)

in Nagano
- Competitors: 21
- Medals Ranked 12th: Gold 3 Silver 4 Bronze 3 Total 10

Winter Paralympics appearances (overview)
- 1980; 1984; 1988; 1992; 1994; 1998; 2002; 2006; 2010; 2014; 2018; 2022

Italy competed at the 1998 Winter Paralympics in Nagano, Japan. 21 competitors from Italy won 10 medals including 3 gold, 4 silver and 3 bronze and finished 12th in the medal table.

== See also ==
- Italy at the Paralympics
- Italy at the 1998 Winter Olympics
