= Luca Pancalli =

Italian sports manager and former swimmer (born 1964)

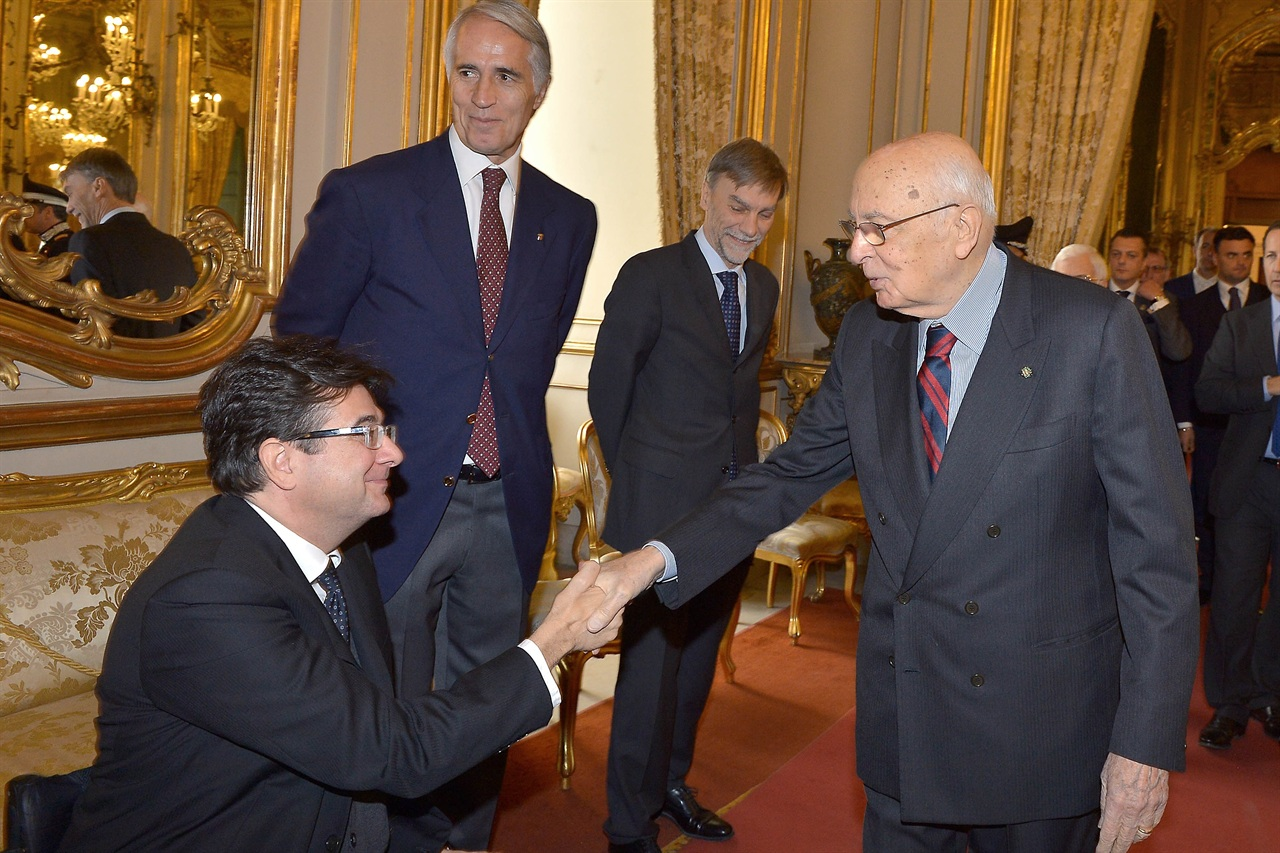
- Pancalli in 2013 with the then Italian president Giorgio Napolitano

Personal information
- Born: 16 April 1964 (age 62) Rome, Italy

Sport
- Country: Italy
- Sport: Paralympic swimming
Medal record
Event	1st	2nd	3rd
Paralympic Games	8	6	1
World Championships	3	0	0
Total	11	6	1
Paralympic Games
Gold medal – first place	1984 Stoke Mandeville/New York	25m breaststroke 1C
Gold medal – first place	1984 Stoke Mandeville/New York	25m butterfly 1C
Gold medal – first place	1984 Stoke Mandeville/New York	25m freestyle 1C
Gold medal – first place	1988 Seoul	50m freestyle 1C
Gold medal – first place	1988 Seoul	100m freestyle 1C
Gold medal – first place	1988 Seoul	25m breaststroke 1C
Gold medal – first place	1996 Atlanta	50m backstroke S4
Gold medal – first place	1996 Atlanta	50m butterfly S4
Silver medal – second place	1984 Stoke Mandeville/New York	100m freestyle 1C
Silver medal – second place	1984 Stoke Mandeville/New York	3x25m individual medley 1C
Silver medal – second place	1988 Seoul	25m backstroke 1C
Silver medal – second place	1996 Atlanta	50m freestyle S4
Silver medal – second place	1996 Atlanta	100m freestyle S4
Silver medal – second place	1996 Atlanta	200m freestyle S4
Bronze medal – third place	1988 Seoul	3x25m freestyle relay 1A-1C
World Para Swimming Championships
Gold medal – first place	1994 Malta	50m backstroke S4
Gold medal – first place	1994 Malta	50m butterfly S3-4
Gold medal – first place	1994 Malta	50m freestyle S4

Luca Pancalli (born 16 April 1964) is an Italian sports manager and former swimmer.

== Early life and education ==
Pancalli was born in Rome. He graduated in law at the Sapienza University of Rome in 1998. As lawyer, he dedicated himself to the field of civil rights and in raising public awareness regarding the issue of disability.

== Career ==
After having won a national youth modern pentathlon championship, Pancalli became a quadriplegic in 1981 following a tumble from a horse during an international race in Austria. Despite this, he was still able to partially move his arms and took part in four different editions of the Paralympic Games from 1984 to 1996, winning eight gold, six silver, and one bronze medal in swimming.

In 1992, Pancalla was among the founders of the Italian Sports Federation of Motoring Special Licenses (FISAPS), which he chaired until 1996, the year in which he became vice-president of the Italian Sports Federation for the Disables (FISD). In 2000, he became president of the FISD. That same year, he was also appointed president of the Italian Paralympic Committee, which later became a public law body. He was then appointed vice-president of the Italian National Olympic Committee, being the first disabled person to take the job. On 21 September 2006, after Guido Rossi resigned, Pancalli was appointed Extraordinary Commissioner of the Italian Football Federation. In October 2006, he opposed the position taken by Rossi in awarding the 2005–06 Serie A title to Inter Milan, the team Rossi supported and of which he had been on the boards of directors, believing that in his opinion it should have remained unassigned. Years later, Inter Milan was charged with multiple Article 1 and Article 6 violations (with Article 6 related to match-fixing and warranting relegation) but the charges were time-barred; Pancalli reiterated his criticism of Rossi's decision.

On 2 February 2007, following gratuitous violences in the Sicilian derby in Catania, which led to the killing of a policeman, Pancalli announced his intention to indefinitely suspend all football activities in the country. This was the second time such an event happened, the first time being after Genoa supporter Vincenzo Spagnolo was stabbed in 1995 by an alleged Milan ultras member called Simone Brasaglia. The suspension ended on 11 February 2007.

In 2021, Pancalla was awarded the title of Knight Grand Cross of the Order of Merit of the Italian Republic.

== See also ==
- Italy at the Paralympics
