= Italy at the 1994 Winter Paralympics =

- IPC code: ITA
- NPC: Comitato Italiano Paralimpico
- Website: www.comitatoparalimpico.it (in Italian)

in Lillehammer
- Competitors: 24
- Medals Ranked 17th: Gold 0 Silver 7 Bronze 6 Total 13

Winter Paralympics appearances (overview)
- 1980; 1984; 1988; 1992; 1994; 1998; 2002; 2006; 2010; 2014; 2018; 2022

Italy competed at the 1994 Winter Paralympics in Lillehammer, Norway. 24 competitors from Italy won 13 medals, 7 silver and 6 bronze, and finished 17th in the medal table.

== See also ==
- Italy at the Paralympics
- Italy at the 1994 Winter Olympics
