= Italy at the 2010 Winter Paralympics =

- IPC code: ITA
- NPC: Comitato Italiano Paralimpico
- Website: www.comitatoparalimpico.it (in Italian)

in Vancouver
- Competitors: 35 in 4 sports
- Flag bearer: Gianmaria Dal Maistro
- Medals Ranked 11th: Gold 1 Silver 3 Bronze 3 Total 7

Winter Paralympics appearances (overview)
- 1980; 1984; 1988; 1992; 1994; 1998; 2002; 2006; 2010; 2014; 2018; 2022; 2026

Italy sent a delegation to compete at the 2010 Winter Paralympics held in Vancouver, British Columbia, Canada. A total of 35 Italian competitors were expected to take part in four disciplines.

== Participants ==
- Alpine skiing: 9 athletes (+1 guide athlete);
- Cross-country skiing: 6 athletes;
- Ice sledge hockey: 15 athletes;
- Wheelchair curling: 5 athletes.

== Medalist ==
Medal	Name	Sport	Event	Date
Gold	Francesca Porcellato	Cross-country	Women's 1 km Sprint Classic, sitting	21
Silver	Enzo Masiello	Cross-country	Men's 10 km Classic, sitting	18
Silver	Melania Corradini	Alpine skiing	Women's super-G, standing	19
Silver	Gianmaria Dal Maistro	Alpine skiing	Men's combined, visually impaired	20
Bronze	Gianmaria Dal Maistro	Alpine skiing	Men's slalom, visually impaired	13
Bronze	Enzo Masiello	Cross-country	Men's 15 km Classic, sitting	15
Bronze	Gianmaria Dal Maistro	Alpine skiing	Men's giant slalom, visually impaired	17

== Alpine skiing ==
Women

Athlete	Event	Final					
Athlete	Event	Run 1	Run 2	Run 3	Total time	Calculated time	Rank
Melania Corradini	Downhill standing						
Daila Dameno							

Men

Athlete	Event	Final					
Athlete	Event	Run 1	Run 2	Run 3	Total time	Calculated time	Rank
Luca Carrara	Slalom standing						
Gianmaria Dal Maistro	Slalom visually impaired						
Enrico Giorge	Downhill sitting						
Enrico Giorge	Slalom sitting						
Christian Lanthaler	Downhill standing						
Hansjoerg Lantschner	Slalom standing						
Luca Maraffio	Downhill sitting						
Michael Stampfer							

== Ice sledge hockey ==
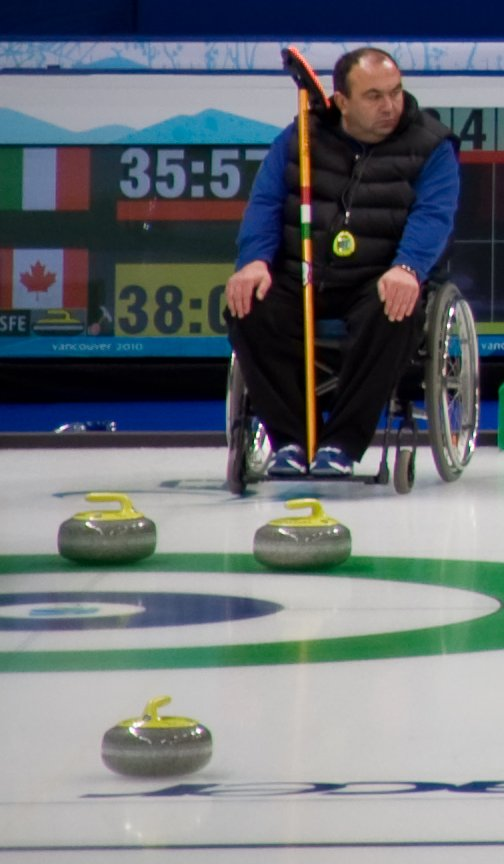
Andrea Tabanelli, skip for the Italian Wheelchair Curling Team, at the Vancouver Olympic/Paralympic Centre.

== See also ==
- Italy at the 2010 Winter Olympics
