= Josef Erlacher =

Italian para-alpine skier (born 1965)

Personal information
- National team: Italy
- Born: May 8, 1965 (age 61) Villanders

Sport
- Country: Italy
- Sport: Paralympic alpine skiing
- Disability: albinism
- Retired: From professional alpine skiing after the Paralympics in Salt Lake City (USA) in 2002
Medal record
Paralympic Games
Bronze medal – third place	1988 Innsbruck	Downhill B3
Bronze medal – third place	1994 Lillehammer	Downhill B3

Josef Erlacher (*8 May 1965 in South Tyrol) is a visually impaired Italian former alpine skier, winner of two Paralympic medals, founder and entrepreneur of the management consulting company IFK Consulting, Speaker, Coach and developer of the 5-Finger Model.

== Biography ==
Josef was born as the first of two children in a family of civil engineers. He attended the Industrial Technical Institute in Bolzano and a year later moved to the Commercial Technical Institute in the same city. From 1985 to 1986, he worked as an administrative assistant in his father's construction company. He obtained a doctorate in marketing, management and controlling at the University of Innsbruck. In 1993 Josef Erlacher founded the management consulting company IFK Consulting and since then has worked as a management consultant for the introduction of ISO 9000, quality systems, controlling and marketing. With 500 clients, the company is the largest and oldest management consultant in South Tyrol.

== Ski career ==
A versatile skier, Erlacher made his debut at the 1988 Paralympic Winter Games in Innsbruck, where he won the bronze medal in the downhill and finished 4th in the giant slalom. At the following Paralympics in Tignes in 1992, he finished 4th in the super giant and did not race in the giant slalom; at the 1994 Paralympics in Lillehammer, he again won the bronze medal in the downhill, finished 4th in the super G and giant slalom and did not finish the special slalom. At the 2002 Paralympics in Salt Lake City, his farewell to competition, he finished 8th in the downhill and did not finish the super-G.
