= Anna Cohí =

Spanish paralympic alpine skier

Personal information
- Full name: Anna Cohí Fornell
- Nationality: Spanish
- Born: 5 October 1988 (age 37) Barcelona, Catalonia, Spain

Sport
- Country: Spain
- Sport: Para-alpine skiing
- Event(s): Downhill slalom Giant slalom Super combined Super G

Anna Cohí Fornell (born 5 October 1988) is a visually impaired Spanish para-alpine Paralympic skier who competed at the 2006 Winter Paralympics and 2010 Winter Paralympics. Cohí is classified as a B3 competitor and skis with guide Raquel Garcia. She began skiing at the age of three and began World Championship competition in 2003 at age fifteen. Cohí has also competed in World Cup and European Cup events and has earned gold medals in the slalom and giant slalom competitions.

== Personal ==
Cohí was born in Barcelona, Catalonia. Cohí was born with a vision impairment and currently resides in Barcelona.

Cohí was honoured at the 2010 Sports Gala XV, a tribute to visually impaired athletes that have won medals in the World Championships. She is involved with Asociación FEAFES Integración Laboral (FEAFES Empleo) and she was part of a jury to determine the winner of the III Premio INTEGRA, an award honoring creative proposals to help people with disabilities gain employment. The award, worth 200,000 euros, was given to Lantegi Batuak Biscay, an employment center for the disabled. The awards were presented in July 2011.

== Skiing ==
Cohí is classified as a B3 para-alpine skier. Cohí took up the sport when she was three years old and skis with Raquel Garcia, her ski guide. Cohí competed at her first World Championships, held in Austria, during the 2003/04 ski season. Only fifteen years old at the time, Cohí win a bronze medal in the slalom event and finished the 2003/04 European Cup in second place. She went on to compete at the 2006 Winter Paralympics, finishing sixth in the slalom and seventh in the giant slalom and super G events.

Cohí competed in the 2006/07 European Cup, ranking third place at the end of the season, and also competed at the 2007 European Cup Alpine skiing for the Disabled. In February 2007, she reached first place in the European Cup with 491 total points. She also competed in the 2007 Paralympic Winter World Cup, earning a medal. Cohí finished the 2007/08 European Cup season in fourth place after the five test events, the last race being held at La Molina in Spain.

At the conclusion of the first World Cup event in the 2008/09 season, Cohí topped the standings. She earned a gold medal at the February 2009 Paralympic World Cup I event, placing first in the slalom. In March 2009, she participated in a Spanish-hosted club event, Campeonato Interautonómico de la Federación Española de Deportes para Ciegos, earning a gold medal in the slalom event. She earned gold medals in the slalom and giant slalom events later that month at the European Cup Alpine skiing for the Disabled competition; she also ranked fourth in the Super Combined event and tenth in the super G. Overall, she finished second at the event with 531 points. She finished in third place in the slalom at the 2009 World Championships in South Korea and finished fourth, less than a second off the bronze medal time, in the Super Combined event. She was one of the six skiers and four guides that made up the Spanish team at the World Championships.

In November 2009, Cohí attended an event in Madrid organised by Programa de Alto Rendimiento Paralímpico (Programa ARPA) as part of the preparation for the Vancouver Games. She participated in additional team training at Centre de Tecnificació de La Cerdanya (Girona). At the 2010 World Cup Alpine skiing for Disabled in Abtenau, Austria, she and her partner made the podium in every event. She earned her third medal, a bronze medal, in the giant slalom event. Although she has planned to compete in the Super Combined event, she was unable to because the event had been cancelled. At the third European Cup event of the season, held in La Molina, Spain, in late January 2010, she won a gold medal in the slalom event. At the final event of the 2009/10 World Cup season, held in March 2010 in Aspen, Colorado, she earned a bronze medal with a time of 1:32.27 while skiing with her guide. She also earned a gold medal in the giant slalom event. She ended the competition medaling in four out of the five events and came into the Aspen World Cup event with 440 World Cup points, ranking fourth in the competition.

Along with her guide, Cohí represented Spain at the 2010 Winter Paralympics as a twenty-two-year-old. Her youth was one of the contributing factors in being chosen for the 2010 Paralympic team, as the Spanish Paralympic Committee believed investing in her would help her become a better skier and compete in several more Paralympics. Before departing for Vancouver, she participated in a departure ceremony attended by Minister for Sport Jaime Lissavetzky, secretary general of Social Policy Francisco Moza, the President of the Spanish Paralympic Committee Carballeda Miguel, and the managing director of the Spanish Paralympic Committee Alberto Jofre. The whole Spanish team arrived in Whistler ahead of the 2010 Games by 7 February.

Fog in Vancouver resulted in a change in scheduling for the ski events she competed in at the games. Cohí finished fifth in the women's para-alpine skiing super combined event, fourth in the slalom event and finished fourth in her first and second runs on the giant slalom course. Cohí and Garcia, her guide, shared a room in the Paralympic Village during the Games. Following her first run at the super combined, Cohí sat in fourth place. She also finished seventh in the downhill event at the 2010 Winter Paralympics. Following the Games, she along with the Spanish Paralympic team attended a welcome back celebration at the ONCE Foundation, an event that was also attended by Infanta Elena, Duchess of Lugo.

In April 2010, Cohí participated in a Vancouver-hosted competition organised by the Federación Española de Deportes de Personas con Discapacidad Física (FEDDF), the Federación Española de Deportes para Paralíticos Cerebrales (FEDPC), and the Federación Española de Deportes para Ciegos (FEDC). She received the gold medal.
