= Melania Corradini =

Italian para-alpine skier

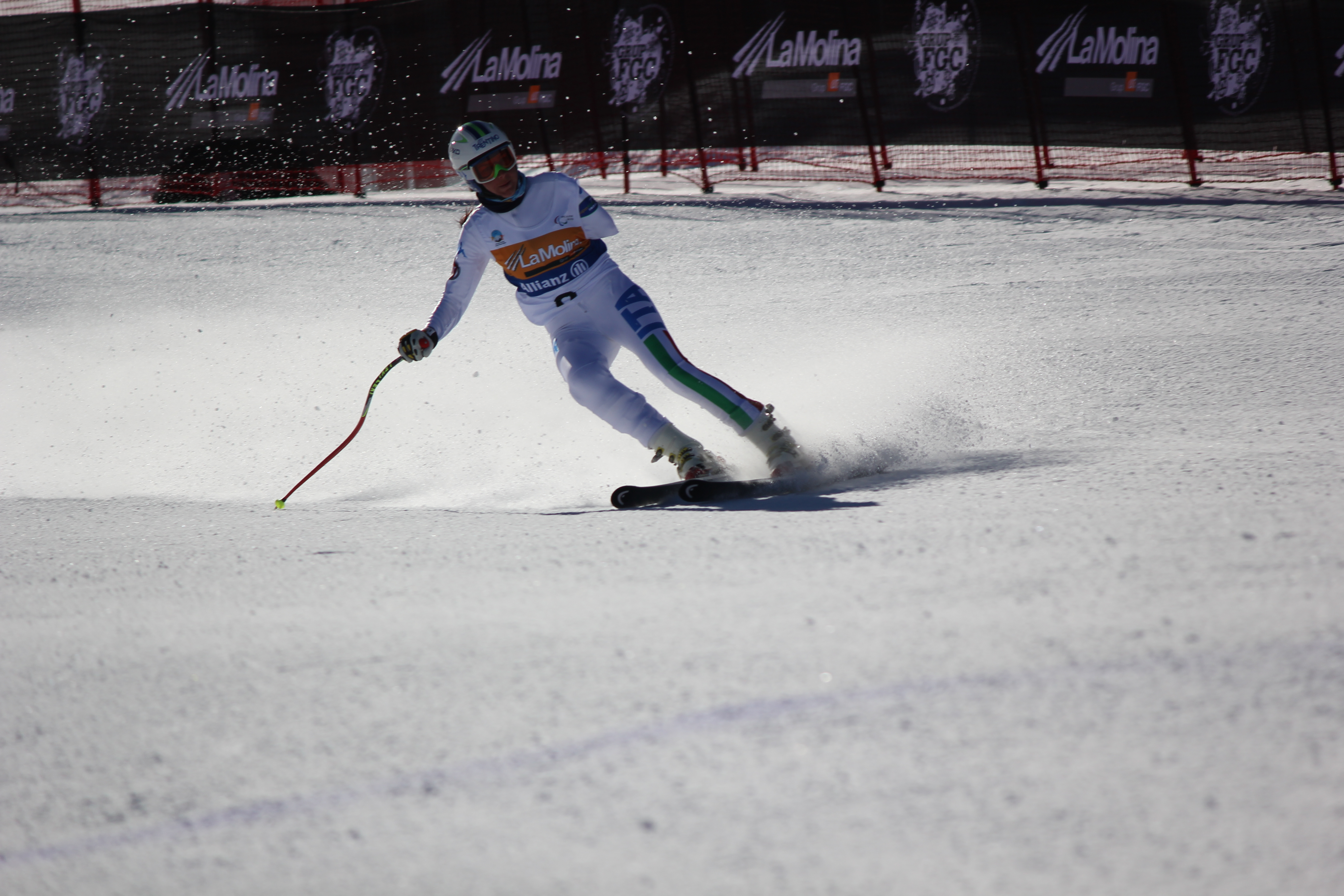

Personal information
- Nationality: Italian
- Born: 13 April 1987 (age 39) Cles, Italy
Medal record
Women's para alpine skiing
Representing Italy
Event	1st	2nd	3rd
Paralympic Games	0	1	0
World Championships	1	2	1
Paralympic Games
Silver medal – second place	2010 Vancouver	Super-G (standing)

Melania Corradini (born 13 April 1987 in Cles) is an Italian paralympic alpine skier.

== Biography ==
She won a silver medal at the 2010 Winter Paralympics.

== Achievements ==
Year	Competition	Venue	Position	Event	Notes
2010	Paralympics Games	(Canada) Vancouver	2nd	Super-G Standing	
2009	World Championships	Jeongseon	1st	Super combined	

== See also ==
- Italy at the 2010 Winter Paralympics
