= Raquel García =

Spanish paralympic alpine skier

Raquel Garcia
Personal information
- Full name: Raquel Garcia Borreguero
- Nationality: Spanish
- Born: 13 August 1986 (age 39) Talavera de la Reina, Spain

Sport
- Country: Spain
- Sport: Para-alpine skiing
- Event(s): Downhill; Slalom; Giant slalom Super combined Super G

Raquel Garcia Borreguero (born 13 August 1986 in Talavera de la Reina) is a Spanish para-alpine guide skier from Huesca. Working with Anna Cohí, she has competed in the European Cup, 2010 Winter Paralympics, and IPC Alpine Skiing World Cup. They have also participated in a Spanish national team training camp.

== Personal ==
Garcia is from Huesca, Spain. She was honoured at the 2010 Sports Gala XV.

== Skiing ==
Garcia is the guide skier for Anna Cohí.

Skiing with Cohí during the 2006/2007 European Cup season, Garcia finished in third place overall. At the 2007 Paralympic Winter World Cup, she earned a medal as Cohí's guide. In February 2007, she was sitting in first place in the European Cup with 491 points. In March 2009, she participated in the Spanish hosted club event, Campeonato Interautonómico de la Federación Española de Deportes para Ciegos, where she earned a gold medal in the slalom event. In March 2009, she earned gold medals in the slalom and giant slalom events the European Cup Alpine skiing for the Disabled. She was fourth in the Super Combined event and tenth in the Super G. Overall, the pair finished second at the event with 531 points. In November 2009, she attended an event in Madrid organised by Programa de Alto Rendimiento Paralímpico (Programa ARPA) as part of the preparation for the Vancouver Games. Following this, she participated in additional team training at Centre de Tecnificació de La Cerdanya (Girona, Catalonia). At the 2010 IPC Alpine Skiing World Cup in Abtenau, Austria, the pair made the podium in every event. Her third medal, a bronze, came in the giant slalom event. She was unable to compete in the Super Combined event because it was cancelled. At the third European Cup event of the season, which was held in La Molina, Spain in late January 2010, she won a gold medal in the slalom event. At the final event of the 2009/2010 World Cup season, an event held in March 2010 in Aspen, Colorado, she earned a bronze medal in one event with a time of 1:32.27 while skiing with Cohí. She also earned a gold medal in the giant slalom event. She ended the competition medaling in four out of the five events. She came into the Aspen World Cup event with 440 World Cup points, ranking fourth in the competition.

Before departing for Vancouver for the 2010 Winter Paralympics, Garcia participated in a departure ceremony attended by State Secretary for Sport Jaime Lissavetzky, secretary general of Social Policy Francisco Moza, the President of the Spanish Paralympic Committee Miguel Carballeda, and managing director of the Spanish Paralympic Committee Alberto Jofre. The whole Spanish team arrived in Whistler ahead of the 2010 Games by 7 February. Skier and guide shared a room in the Paralympic Village during the Games. Fog in Vancouver resulted in a change in scheduling for her ski events. She finished seventh in the downhill event at the 2010 Winter Paralympics. She had been sitting in fourth position in the super combined following her first run. Following the Games, the Spanish Paralympic team attended a welcome back celebration at the ONCE Foundation that was also attended by Infanta Elena, Duchess of Lugo. Following the Vancouver Paralympics, she participated in Spanish national team competition from 5 to 7 April 2010 in Vancouver. It was organised by the Federación Española de Deportes de Personas con Discapacidad Física, Federación Española de Deportes para Paralíticos Cerebrales and Federación Española de Deportes para Ciegos.
