= Chiara Mazzel =

Italian Para alpine skier (born 1996)

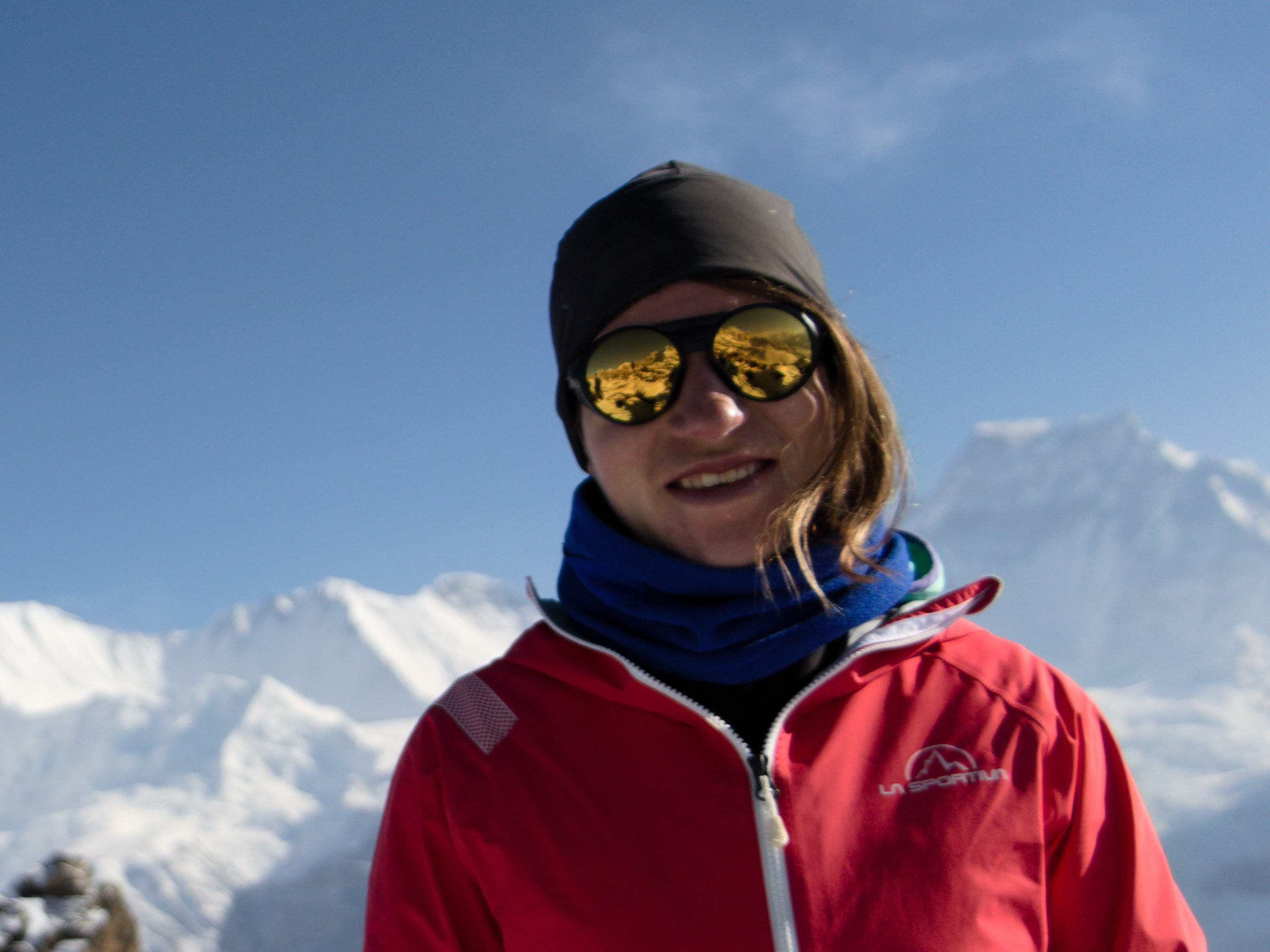

Personal information
- Born: 19 March 1996 (age 30) Cavalese, Trento, Italy

Sport
- Country: Italy
- Sport: Para alpine skiing
- Disability: Visually Impaired
- Disability class: AS2
- Events: Slalom, Giant Slalom, Super-G, Combined, Downhill
- Club: Fiamme Gialle

Achievements and titles
- Paralympic finals: 2022
- World finals: 2023, 2025
Medal record
Women's Para alpine skiing
Representing Italy
Paralympic Games
Gold medal – first place	2026 Milano Cortina	Super-G
Silver medal – second place	2026 Milano Cortina	Downhill
Silver medal – second place	2026 Milano Cortina	Super combined
Silver medal – second place	2026 Milano Cortina	Giant slalom
World Championships
Gold medal – first place	2023 Espot	Downhill
Gold medal – first place	2023 Espot	Super-G
Gold medal – first place	2023 Espot	Alpine Combined
Silver medal – second place	2025 Maribor	Giant slalom
Silver medal – second place	2025 Maribor	Slalom

Chiara Mazzel (born 19 March 1996) is an Italian Para alpine skier, who won multiple events at the 2023 and 2025 World Para Alpine Skiing Championships. She competed at the 2022 and 2026 Winter Paralympics.

== Early life ==
Mazzel from San Giovanni di Fassa, Trento, Italy. As a teenager, she was diagnosed with glaucoma, and has been partially sighted since. In her spare time, she is rock climbing, tandem cycling and plays the french horn. In April 2023, Mazzel have been trekking to the Gokyo Lakes and Everest South base camp in Nepal.

== Career ==
She started competition events in 2019, alongside guide Fabrizio Casal. She competes in visually impaired classification events. Mazzel competed at the 2022 Winter Paralympics. She finished seventh in the Slalom event.

At the 2023 World Para Alpine Skiing Championships in Espot, Spain, Mazzel won the Downhill, Super-G and Alpine Combined events. Later that year, she won the Downhill Crystal Globe in Sella Nevea, Italy.

At the 2025 World Para Alpine Skiing Championships in Maribor, Slovenia, Mazzel took two silver medals, in the slalom and giant slalom events.
