= Gabriele Araudo =

Italian ice sledge hockey player (born 1974)

- Born: August 5, 1974 (age 52) Carmagnola, Italy
- National team: Italy
Medal record
Men's para ice hockey
Representing Italy
European Championships
Gold medal – first place	2011 Sollefteå	Team competition

Gabriele Araudo (born August 5, 1974, in Carmagnola) is an Italian ice sledge hockey player.

He was part of the Italian sledge hockey team at the 2010 Winter Paralympics in Vancouver, Canada.

He was on the Italian team at the 2011 IPC Ice Sledge Hockey European Championships.
