= Santino Stillitano =

Italian para ice hockey player

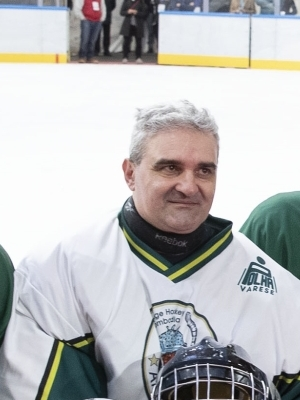

Personal information
- Born: 26 June 1969 (age 57) Saronno
Medal record
Men's para ice hockey
Representing Italy
European Championships
Gold medal – first place	2011 Sollefteå	Team competition
Silver medal – second place	2016 Östersund	Team competition

Santino Stillitano (born 26 June 1969 in Saronno) is an Italian ice sledge hockey goaltender.

== Career ==
Stillitano suffers from agenesis in his right leg.

He started playing ice sledge hockey in 2006, after the 2006 Winter Paralympics in Turin, with the Armata Brancaleone Varese of the Italian para ice hockey championship.

Already in 2007, he was called up to join the Italy national para ice hockey team.

With the Azzurri, he took part in four editions of the Paralympic Winter Games (Vancouver 2010, Sochi 2014, Pyeongchang 2018 and Beijing 2022, where he was the oldest athlete of the Italian expedition) and ten World Championships, in addition to winning two European medals: gold in 2011 and silver in 2016.
