= Bruno Oberhammer =

Italian para-alpine skier (born 1955)

Personal information
- National team: Italy
- Born: 17 October 1955 (age 70) St. Lorenzen, Italy

Sport
- Country: Italy
- Sport: Paralympic alpine skiing
Medal record
Paralympic Games
Bronze medal – third place	1984 Innsbruck	Alpine Combination B2
Gold medal – first place	1988 Innsbruck	Giant Slalom B3
Gold medal – first place	1988 Innsbruck	Downhill B3
Silver medal – second place	1992 Albertville	Super-G B3
Bronze medal – third place	1992 Albertville	Giant Slalom B3
Silver medal – second place	1994 Lillehammer	Slalom B3
Silver medal – second place	1994 Lillehammer	Super-G B3
Silver medal – second place	1994 Lillehammer	Giant Slalom B3
Silver medal – second place	1994 Lillehammer	Downhill B3
Gold medal – first place	1998 Nagano	Slalom B1,3
Bronze medal – third place	1998 Nagano	Super-G B1,3
Bronze medal – third place	1998 Nagano	Downhill B1,3

Bruno Oberhammer (born 17 October 1955) is an Italian para-alpine skier.

Oberhammer competed at the Winter Paralympics in 1984, 1988, 1992, 1994 and 1998 and, in total, he won three gold medals, five silver medals and four bronze medals.

== Biography ==
Oberhammer first competed in the Paralympics at the 1984 Winter Paralympics in Innsbruck, Austria, at the Alpine Combination B2, Downhill B2 and Giant Slalom B2 events. He won the bronze medal at the Alpine Combination B2 event. At the 1988 Winter Paralympics, the 1992 Winter Paralympics and the 1994 Winter Paralympics Oberhammer won a medal in each event that he competed in. He also won a gold medal and two bronze medals at the 1998 Winter Paralympics.

== Achievements ==
- 1984 Winter Paralympics
  - (bronze) Men's Alpine Combination B2
- 1988 Winter Paralympics
  - (gold) Men's Giant Slalom B3
  - (gold) Men's Downhill B3
- 1992 Winter Paralympics
  - (silver) Men's Super-G B3
  - (bronze) Men's Giant Slalom B3
- 1994 Winter Paralympics
  - (silver) Men's Slalom B3
  - (silver) Men's Super-G B3
  - (silver) Men's Giant Slalom B3
  - (silver) Men's Downhill B3
- 1998 Winter Paralympics
  - (gold) Men's Slalom B1,3
  - (bronze) Men's Super-G B1,3
  - (bronze) Men's Downhill B1,3

== See also ==
- List of Paralympic medalists in alpine skiing
