= Italian Paralympic Committee =

National Paralympic Committee of Italy

Comitato Italiano Paralimpico
- Country/Region: Italy
- Code: ITA
- Created: 1990
- Recognized: 1990
- President: Luca Pancalli
- Website: www.comitatoparalimpico.it

The Italian Paralympic Committee (Italian: Comitato Italiano Paralimpico; CIP), founded in 1990 and a member of the International Paralympic Committee (IPC), is responsible for the development and management of paralympic sports in Italy.

== Presidents ==
- 2005-reigning: Luca Pancalli

Federazione Italiana Sport Handicappati (FISHa)

- 1980-1990 Roberto Marson

Federazione Italiana Sport Disabili (FISD)

- 1990 - 1992: Roberto Marson
- 1992: Mario Pescante (CONI Commissary)
- 1992 - 2000: Antonio Vernole
- 2000 - 2005: Luca Pancalli

== See also ==
- Italian National Olympic Committee
- Italy at the Paralympics
