= 2023 Para Hockey Cup =

International ice sledge hockey tournament

Tournament details
- Host country: Canada
- Venue(s): QPlex (in Quispamsis, New Brunswick)
- Dates: December 3, 2023 – December 9, 2023
- Teams: 4

Final positions
- Champions: United States
- Runners-up: Canada
- Third place: Czech Republic
- Fourth place: China

Tournament statistics
- Games played: 10

The 2023 Para Hockey Cup was an international ice sledge hockey tournament organized by Hockey Canada hosted in Quispamsis, New Brunswick, from December 3–9, 2023, at the QPlex Arena.

== Teams ==
- Canada
- Czech Republic
- China
- United States

== 2023 Tournament ==
=== Venue ===
Quispamsis	Quispamsis is located in New Brunswick
QPlex	Quispamsis is located in New Brunswick

=== Preliminary round ===
All times are local (UTC-4).

Team	Pld	W	OTW	OTL	L	GF	GA	GD	Pts
United States	3	3	0	0	0	19	1	+18	9
Canada	3	2	0	0	1	7	6	+1	6
China	3	1	0	0	2	6	16	−10	3
Czech Republic	3	0	0	0	3	1	10	−9	0

Updated to match(es) played on December 8, 2023. Source:

3 December 2023; 12:00	Czech Republic	0 - 3 (0-2, 0-0, 0-1)	United States	QPlex Arena

Game reference

Patrick Sedlacek
Goalies
Jen Lee

0-1	Roybal (Farmer, Pauls) - 3:32
0-2	Douglas (Misiewicz, Wallace) - 3:59
0-3	Farmer (Roybal, Lee) - 39:54

0 min
Penalties
6 min
9
Shots
22

3 December 2023; 16:00	China	1 - 4 (0-2, 1-1, 0-1)	Canada	QPlex Arena

Game reference

Ji YanZhao
Goalies
Adam Kingsmill

	0-1	Hickey (McGregor, Cozzolino) (PP) - 2:37
	0-2	Cozzolino (McGregor, Diagle) - 4:22
Wang (Xu) (SH) - 18:18	1-2
	1-3	Cozzolino (McGregor, Halbert) - 23:29
	1-4	McGregor (Cozzolino) - 39:15

4 min
Penalties
2 min
7
Shots
21

4 December 2023; 11:00	China	1 - 11 (1-8, 0-3, 0-0)	United States	QPlex Arena

Game reference

Wei Wang
Goalies
Griffin LaMarre

	0-1	Farmer (Roybal) - 0:37
	0-2	Wallace (Roybal, Misiewicz) - 1:38
Shen - 2:39	1-2
	1-3	Bolton (Dodson) - 3:19
	1-4	McKee (Farmer) - 3:35
	1-5	Misiewicz (Farmer, Wallace) - (PP) - 5:05
	1-6	Bolton - 7:39
	1-7	Dodson (Wallace) - 8:43
	1-8	Misiewicz (Wallace, Roybal) - (PP) - 14:37
	1-9	Roybal (Wallace) - 15:35
	1-10	Cunningham - 23:36
	1-11	Roybal (Farmer, Misiewicz) - 23:46

10 min
Penalties
4 min
9
Shots
21

4 December 2023; 19:00	Canada	3 - 0 (0-0, 2-0, 1-0)	Czech Republic	QPlex Arena

Game reference

Adam Kingsmill
Mitchel Garrett
Goalies
Martin Kudela

Cozzolino (McGregor, Diagle) - 18:52	1-0
Cozzolino (McGregor) - 24:30	2-0
Jacobs-Webb (Messaoudi, Halbert) - 41:05	3-0

2 min
Penalties
0 min
21
Shots
4

6 December 2023; 11:00	Czech Republic	0 - 3 (0-1, 0-0, 0-2)	China	QPlex Arena

Game reference

Patrick Sedalcek
Goalies
Ji YanZhao

	0-1	Shen - 10:25
	0-2	Zhu (Tian) - 31:19
	0-3	Song (Wang) - 31:54
	0-4	Tian (Shen) - 44:20
Kapko - 44:51	1-4

2 min
Penalties
8 min
21
Shots
17

6 December 2023; 19:00	United States	5 - 0	Canada	QPlex Arena

Game reference

Jen Lee
Goalies
Adam Kingsmill

Farmer (Misiewicz, Pauls) - 8:33	1-0
Farmer (Misiewicz) (PP) - 12:25	2-0
Farmer (Roybal, Wallace) - 23:03	3-0
Farmer (EN) (SH) - 41:47	4-0
Wallace (McKee) - 43:37	5-0

8 min
Penalties
20 min
21
Shots
9

=== Playoff round ===
Semi-finals
1	United States	6
4	Czech Republic	0
2	Canada	6
3	China	0

Gold Medal
1	United States	3
2	Canada	0
Bronze Medal
3	China	1
4	Czech Republic	4

==== Semi-finals ====
8 December 2023; 15:00	Czech Republic	0 - 6 (0-4, 0-0, 0-2)	United States	QPlex Arena

Game reference

Martin Kudela
Goalies
Griffin LaMarre

0-1	Misiewicz (Farmer, Roybal) - 4:31
0-2	Farmer (Misiewicz, Roybal) - 4:53
0-3	Nichols (McKee) - 10:03
0-4	Pauls (Misiewicz, Farmer) - 11:29
0-5	McKee - 33:21
0-6	Roybal (Pauls, Farmer) - 37:12

2 min
Penalties
4 min
4
Shots
27

8 December 2023; 19:00	China	0 - 6 (0-3, 0-1, 0-2)	Canada	QPlex Arena

Game reference

Yan Zhao Ji
Goalies
Adam Kingsmill

0-1	McGregor (Hickey, Cozzolino) - 6:15
0-2	Lavin (Smith, Dixon) - 9:30
0-3	McGregor (Cozzolino, Dunn) - (PP) - 12:01
0-4	Tyler McGregor (Cozzolino, Halbert) - (PP) - 23:46
0-5	Hickey (LeBlanc) - 39:08
0-6	Dunn (Cozzolino, McGregor) - 39:43

==== Bronze-medal game ====
9 December 2023; 15:00	Czech Republic	4 - 1 (2-1, 2-0, 0-0)	China	QPlex Arena

Game reference

Martin Kudela
Goalies
Yan Zhao Ji

Dolezal (Zizlavsky) - 5:56	1-0
Zelinka (Zizlavsky) - 9:22	2-0
	2-1	Shen - 14:02
Palat - 16:57	3-1
Zizlavsky (Hecko) - 24:48	4-1

8 min
Penalties
16 min
15
Shots
12

==== Gold-medal game ====
9 December 2023; 19:00	Canada	0 - 3	United States	QPlex Arena

=== Final standings ===
	Team
1st place, gold medalist(s)	United States
2nd place, silver medalist(s)	Canada
3rd place, bronze medalist(s)	Czech Republic
4th	China

== Statistics ==
Scoring Leaders
Player	Team	GP	G	A	P	PIM
Brody Roybal	United States	2	3	4	7	2
Dominic Cozzolino	Canada	2	4	2	6	0
Declan Farmer	United States	2	2	4	6	0
Tyler McGregor	Canada	2	1	5	6	0
Jack Wallace	United States	2	1	5	6	2

Top goaltenders
Player	Team	GP	Mins	GA	SO	GAA	Sv%	Record
Jen Lee	United States	1	45	0	1	0.00	1.000	1-0-0
Adam Kingsmill	Canada	1	45	1	0	1.00	0.857	1-0-0
Patrick Sedlacek	Czech Republic	1	45	3	0	3.00	0.864	0-1-0
