= Noah Grove =

American ice sledge hockey player

Personal information
- Nickname: Peaches
- Born: May 1, 1999 (age 27) Frederick, Maryland, U.S.
- Home town: Frederick, Maryland, U.S.
- Education: University of New Hampshire
- Height: 5 ft 7 in (170 cm)
- Weight: 142 lb (64 kg)
Medal record
Para ice hockey
Representing United States
Paralympic Games
Gold medal – first place	2018 Pyeongchang	Team competition
Gold medal – first place	2022 Beijing	Team competition
Gold medal – first place	2026 Milano Cortina	Team competition
World Championships
Gold medal – first place	2019 Ostrava	Team competition
Gold medal – first place	2021 Ostrava	Team competition
Gold medal – first place	2023 Moose Jaw	Team competition
Gold medal – first place	2025 Buffalo	Team competition
Silver medal – second place	2017 Gangneung	Team competition
Silver medal – second place	2024 Calgary	Team competition

Noah Grove (born May 1, 1999) is an American ice sled hockey player.

== Career ==
Grove was a member of the gold medal-winning US team at the 2018 and 2022 Winter Paralympics. He also played amputee football at the 2014 World Cup. On January 2, 2026, he was named to Team USA's roster for the 2026 Winter Paralympics. He won a gold medal, Team USA's fifth consecutive gold medal in Para ice hockey at the Winter Paralympics.
