= Evan Nichols =

American ice sledge hockey player

Personal information
- Full name: Evan Nichols
- Born: July 29, 2004 (age 21) Haymarket, Virginia, U.S.

Sport
- Country: United States
- Sport: Ice sled hockey
- Position: Forward
Medal record
Para ice hockey
Representing United States
Paralympic Games
Gold medal – first place	2022 Beijing	Team competition
Gold medal – first place	2026 Milano Cortina	Team competition
World Championships
Gold medal – first place	2023 Moose Jaw	Team competition
Gold medal – first place	2025 Buffalo	Team competition
Silver medal – second place	2024 Calgary	Team competition

Evan Nichols (born July 29, 2004) is an American ice sled hockey player. He was a member of the United States national team that won gold at the 2022 and 2026 Winter Paralympics.

== Career ==
Nichols made his international debut with the United States national team during the 2022 Winter Paralympics and won a gold medal. At 17 years old, he was the youngest member on the Paralympic sled hockey roster.

He represented the United States at the 2023 World Para Ice Hockey Championships and won a gold medal. He again represented the United States at the 2024 World Para Ice Hockey Championships and won a silver medal.

On January 2, 2026, he was named to Team USA's roster for the 2026 Winter Paralympics. He won a gold medal, Team USA's fifth consecutive gold medal in Para ice hockey at the Winter Paralympics.
