= Malik Jones (sledge hockey) =

American ice sledge hockey player (born 2002)

Personal information
- Full name: Malik Jones
- Born: December 6, 2002 (age 23) Aurora, Colorado, U.S.

Sport
- Country: United States
- Sport: Ice sled hockey
- Position: Forward
Medal record
Para ice hockey
Representing United States
Paralympic Games
Gold medal – first place	2022 Beijing	Team competition
Gold medal – first place	2026 Milano Cortina	Team competition
World Championships
Gold medal – first place	2023 Moose Jaw	Team competition
Gold medal – first place	2025 Buffalo	Team competition
Silver medal – second place	2024 Calgary	Team competition

Malik Jones (born December 6, 2002) is an American ice sled hockey player. He was a member of the United States national team that won gold at the 2022 and 2026 Winter Paralympics.

== Career ==
Jones represented the United States at the 2022 Winter Paralympics and won a gold medal. He became the second black athlete to represent the U.S. in sled hockey at the Paralympics.

He represented the United States at the 2023 World Para Ice Hockey Championships and won a gold medal. He again represented the United States at the 2024 World Para Ice Hockey Championships and won a silver medal.

On January 2, 2026, he was named to Team USA's roster for the 2026 Winter Paralympics. He won a gold medal, Team USA's fifth consecutive gold medal in Para ice hockey at the Winter Paralympics.

== Personal life ==
Jones has been playing sled hockey since the age of seven. He was born without shinbones and had his legs amputated at 10 months old.
