= Jen Lee (sledge hockey) =

American ice sled hockey player (born 1986)

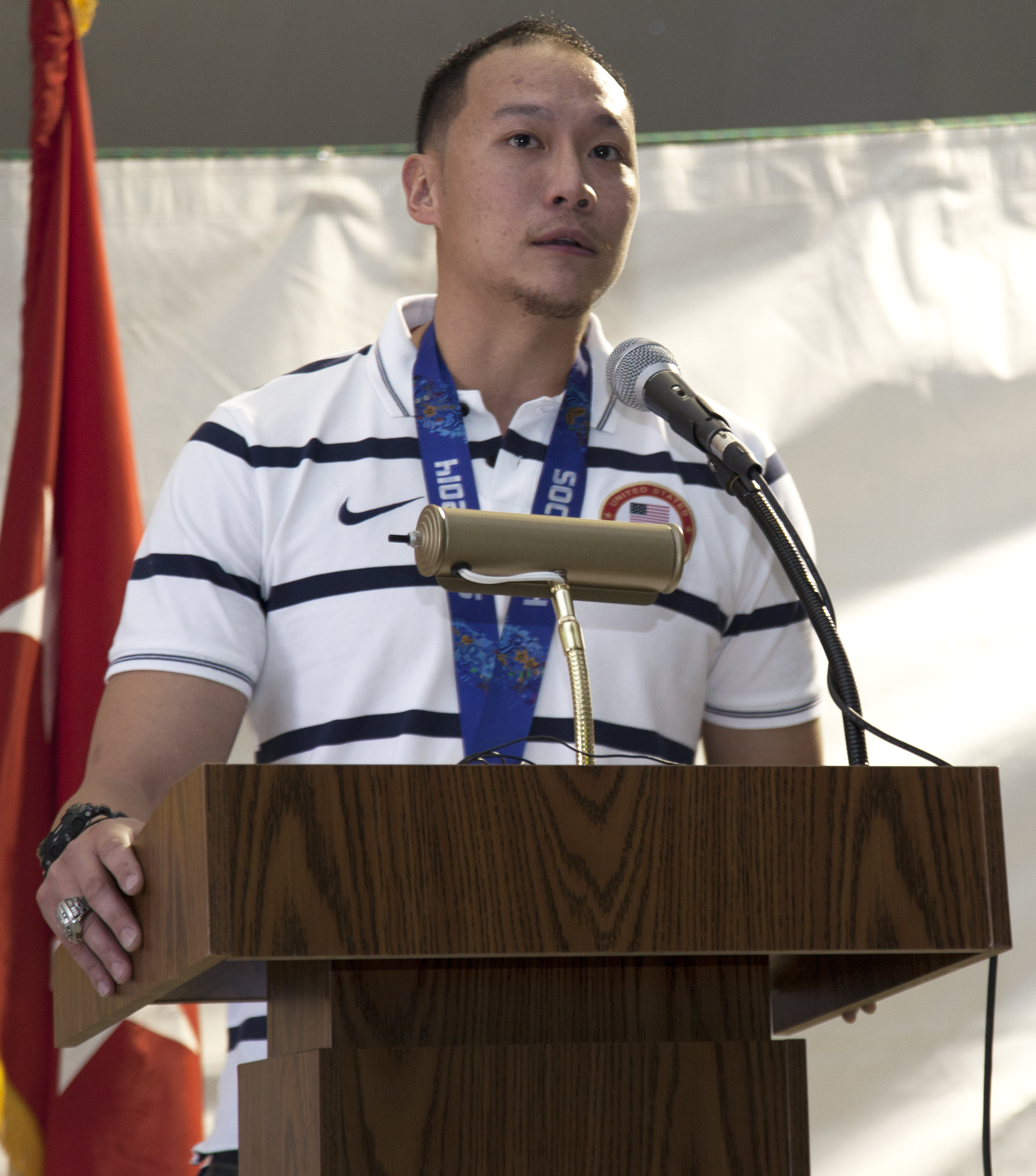
- Lee in 2015

Personal information
- Full name: Jen Lee
- Born: July 26, 1986 (age 39) Taipei, Taiwan

Sport
- Country: United States
- Sport: Ice sled hockey
- Position: Goalie
Medal record
Para ice hockey
Representing United States
Paralympic Games
Gold medal – first place	2014 Sochi	Team competition
Gold medal – first place	2018 Pyeongchang	Team competition
Gold medal – first place	2022 Beijing	Team competition
Gold medal – first place	2026 Milano Cortina	Team competition
World Championships
Gold medal – first place	2012 Hamar	Team competition
Gold medal – first place	2019 Ostrava	Team competition
Gold medal – first place	2021 Ostrava	Team competition
Gold medal – first place	2023 Moose Jaw	Team competition
Gold medal – first place	2025 Buffalo	Team competition
Silver medal – second place	2013 Goyang	Team competition
Silver medal – second place	2024 Calgary	Team competition

Jen Lee (born July 26, 1986) is a Taiwanese-American ice sled hockey player. He was a member of the United States national team that won gold at the 2014, 2018, 2022 and 2026 Winter Paralympics.

== Career ==
Lee served as the backup goaltender for the United States, behind starter Steve Cash, at the 2014 and 2018 Winter Paralympics. After the retirement of Cash, Lee was named the starting goaltender for the United States at the 2022 Winter Paralympics. During the 2022 Paralympics, he had three shutouts in his first Paralympics as the starting goaltender. He did not allow a goal in any of his four starts, stopping all 33 shots faced.

On January 2, 2026, he was named to Team USA's roster for the 2026 Winter Paralympics. He won a gold medal, Team USA's fifth consecutive gold medal in Para ice hockey at the Winter Paralympics.

== Personal life ==
Lee had his left leg amputated above the knee after injuring it in a motorcycle accident in 2009. He served in the United States Army as an aircraft mechanic. Lee graduated from the University of Texas at Austin with a degree from the College of Education’s Sport Management program.
