= James Dunn (sledge hockey) =

Canadian ice sledge hockey player

Personal information
- Born: November 12, 2000 (age 25) Wallacetown, Ontario, Canada
- Years active: 2018–present

Sport
- Country: Canada
- Sport: Ice sledge hockey
- Position: Forward
Medal record
Para ice hockey
Representing Canada
Paralympic Games
Silver medal – second place	2018 Pyeongchang	Team competition
Silver medal – second place	2022 Beijing	Team competition
Silver medal – second place	2026 Milano Cortina	Team competition
World Championships
Gold medal – first place	2024 Calgary	Team competition
Silver medal – second place	2019 Ostrava	Team competition
Silver medal – second place	2021 Ostrava	Team competition
Silver medal – second place	2023 Moose Jaw	Team competition
Silver medal – second place	2025 Buffalo	Team competition

James Dunn (born November 12, 2000) is a Canadian sledge hockey player.

== Early life ==
Dunn was born on November 12, 2000, in Wallacetown, Ontario, Canada to parents Jeremy and Coralee Dunn. On December 2, 2011, at the age of 11, he had had a biopsy taken on his right femur bone and was diagnosed with osteosarcoma. He immediately underwent chemotherapy treatments and had his leg amputated in a surgical procedure that lasted almost 16 hours. While recovering in the hospital, Dunn was encouraged by Tyler McGregor to try out sledge hockey.

== Career ==
On February 11, 2018, at the age of 17, Dunn became the youngest member named to Canada's national para ice hockey team to compete at the 2018 Winter Paralympics. With his assistance, Team Canada won a silver medal in an overtime loss to the United States.

He again represented Canada at the 2022 Winter Paralympics and won a silver medal in Para ice hockey. He competed at the 2026 Winter Paralympics and won a silver medal, Canada's third consecutive silver medal in Para ice hockey at the Winter Paralympics.
