= Shawn Burnett =

Canadian ice sledge hockey player (born 2003)

Personal information
- Full name: Shawn Burnett
- Born: May 2, 2003 (age 23)
- Home town: McMasterville, Quebec, Canada

Sport
- Country: Canada
- Sport: Ice sled hockey
- Position: Defence
- Disability: Paraplegic
Medal record
Para ice hockey
Representing Canada
Paralympic Games
Silver medal – second place	2026 Milano Cortina	Team competition
World Championships
Gold medal – first place	2024 Calgary	Team competition
Silver medal – second place	2025 Buffalo	Team competition

Shawn Burnett (born May 2, 2003) is a Canadian ice sled hockey player who was a member of the Canada national para ice hockey team that competed at the 2026 Winter Paralympics.

== Career ==
Burnett made his World Para Ice Hockey Championships debut for Canada at the 2024 World Para Ice Hockey Championships, and won a gold medal, their first gold medal since 2017. He again competed at the 2025 World Para Ice Hockey Championships, and won a silver medal.

On January 20, 2026, he was selected to represent Canada at the 2026 Winter Paralympics. He won a silver medal, Canada's third consecutive silver medal in Para ice hockey at the Winter Paralympics.

== Personal life ==
On June 6, 2021, Burnett was involved in a skydiving accident that fractured his back and caused a spinal cord injury leaving him paralyzed from the waist down.
