= Chris Douglas (sledge hockey) =

American ice sled hockey player

Personal information
- Full name: Christopher Douglas
- Born: May 17, 1990 (age 36) Orlando, Florida, U.S.
- Height: 5 ft 9 in (175 cm)
- Weight: 150 lb (68 kg)
Medal record
Men's para ice hockey
Representing United States
World Championships
Gold medal – first place	2015 Buffalo	Team competition
Gold medal – first place	2019 Ostrava	Team competition
Gold medal – first place	2021 Ostrava	Team competition
Gold medal – first place	2023 Moose Jaw	Team competition
Gold medal – first place	2025 Buffalo	Team competition
Silver medal – second place	2017 Gangneung	Team competition
Silver medal – second place	2024 Calgary	Team competition

Christopher Douglas (born May 17, 1990) is an American ice sled hockey player.

== Career ==
Douglas was a member of the United States gold medal-winning teams at the 2015, 2019, 2023 World Para Ice Hockey Championships, and 2025 World Para Ice Hockey Championships. He was also a member of the silver medal-winning team at the 2017 World Para Ice Hockey Championships.
