= Josh Pauls =

American ice sledge hockey player (born 1992)

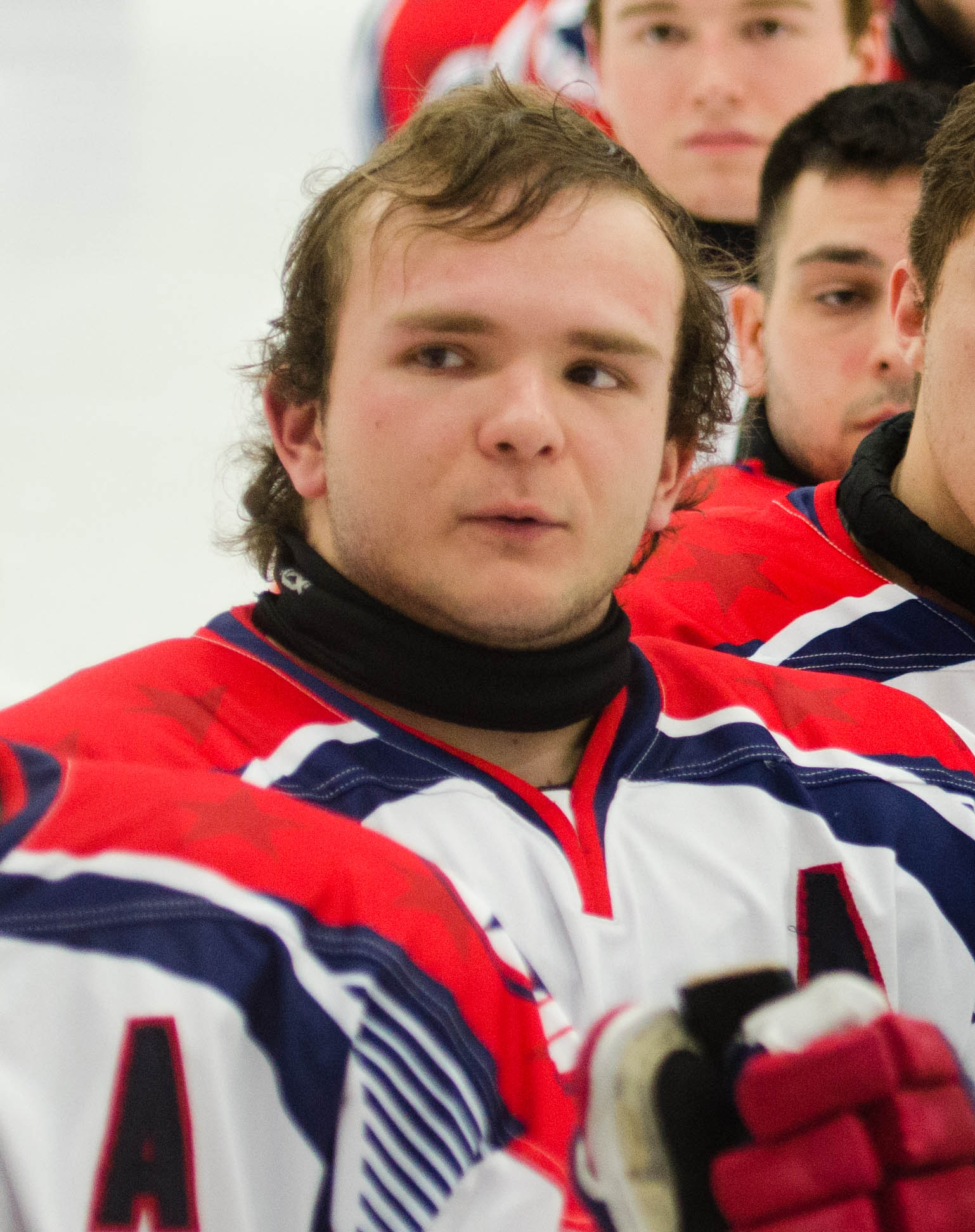
- Pauls in 2015

Personal information
- Full name: Joshua Pauls
- Born: December 31, 1992 (age 33) South Plainfield, New Jersey, U.S.
- Height: 5 ft 8 in (173 cm)
- Weight: 135 lb (61 kg)

Sport
- Sport: Ice sled hockey
- Disability: Bilateral Leg Amputee
- Club: Disabled Athlete Sports Association (DASA) St. Louis Blues
Medal record
Para ice hockey
Representing United States
Paralympic Games
Gold medal – first place	2010 Vancouver	Team competition
Gold medal – first place	2014 Sochi	Team competition
Gold medal – first place	2018 PyeongChang	Team competition
Gold medal – first place	2022 Beijing	Team competition
Gold medal – first place	2026 Milano Cortina	Team competition
World Championships
Gold medal – first place	2009 Ostrava	Team competition
Gold medal – first place	2012 Hamar	Team competition
Gold medal – first place	2015 Buffalo	Team competition
Gold medal – first place	2019 Ostrava	Team competition
Gold medal – first place	2021 Ostrava	Team competition
Gold medal – first place	2023 Moose Jaw	Team competition
Gold medal – first place	2025 Buffalo	Team competition
Silver medal – second place	2013 Goyang	Team competition
Silver medal – second place	2017 Gangneung	Team competition
Silver medal – second place	2024 Calgary	Team competition

Joshua Pauls (born December 31, 1992) is an ice sled hockey player from USA and Member of the U.S. National Sled Hockey Team. He took part in the 2010 Winter Paralympics in Vancouver, where USA won gold. They beat Japan 2–0 in the final.

A resident of Green Brook Township, New Jersey, he attended Watchung Hills Regional High School.

Born without tibia bones in both legs and had both amputated at the age of 10 months old. Competed with the St. Louis Blues sled hockey club team at the 2011 USA Hockey Sled Classic, presented by the NHL. Member of the New York Rangers Sled Hockey club team from 2002 to 2008. Hopes to become a professional hockey coach.

== Career ==
Born into the Pauls family of South Plainfield, New Jersey, he was born without tibia bones in both legs, and had both amputated when he was 10 months old. In 2002, Josh became a member of the New York Jr. Rangers Sled Hockey club team. Josh competed for the New York Jr. Rangers Sled Hockey from 2002 to 2011. Then in 2011 he became a member of the Disabled Athlete Sports Association's (DASA) St. Louis Blues Sled Hockey Team. In 2012 Josh helped the Blues clam USA Hockey Adult Sled Hockey Tier II National Championship. In 2013, Josh helped the Blues win the 2013 Toyota-USA Hockey Adult Sled National Championship.

In 2008 Josh made the U.S. National Sled Hockey Team, which represented the United States at the 2010 Winter Paralympics in Vancouver, British Columbia, Canada. Ever since making the U.S. National Sled Hockey Team, Josh has had a tradition of facing a Mr. Potatohead figure towards the opponent's locker room before every game. Currently, Josh, resides in St. Charles, Mo., where he attends Lindenwood University and is pursuing a degree in sport management. He is a member of Phi Delta Theta fraternity. Josh states "He hopes to become a professional hockey coach for a USA Hockey Team someday." Between his studies at Lindenwood University, Josh is back training with U.S. National Sled Hockey Team as prepare for the 2014 Winter Paralympics in Sochi, Russia.

On January 2, 2026, he was named to Team USA's roster for the 2026 Winter Paralympics. He won a gold medal, Team USA's fifth consecutive gold medal in Para ice hockey at the Winter Paralympics.

== United states hockey career ==
=== 2012-13 ===
- Member of the U.S. National Sled Hockey Team
- Led Team USA with 20 points and nine goals. His 11 assists were tied for first on the squad
- Helped Team USA to a silver medal at the 2013 International Paralympic Committee Ice Sledge World Championship in Goyang City, South Korea.
- Tied for first on Team USA with eight points (4-4) in five games during the tournament
- Notched four goals and an assist in USA's 7–0 win vs. Norway
- Helped Team USA to a first-place finish at the December 2012 World Sledge Hockey Challenge in Calgary, Alta.
- Skated in all five games, scoring three goals with one assist
- Helped Team USA to a first-place finish at the January 2013 USA Hockey Sled Cup in Indian Trail, N.C.
- In four games, led the tournament with seven points (2-5)
- Contributed to Team USA's two wins in its three-game series vs. Canada February 2013 in Rockland, Ont.
- Skated in all three games, tallying an assist

=== 2011-12 ===
- Member of the U.S. National Sled Hockey Team
- Helped Team USA to a gold medal at the 2012 International Paralympic Committee Ice Sledge World Championship in Hamar, Norway
- Played in all five games, recording a goal and an assist
- Helped Team USA to a second-place finish at the November 2011 World Sledge Hockey Challenge in Calgary, Alta.
- Appeared in all five games, tallying three goals, all of which came vs. Norway in the semifinals
- Played in all three games vs. Canada in February 2012 series held in Williamsville, N.Y. Notched an assist

=== 2010-11 ===
- Member of the U.S. National Sled Hockey Team
- Helped Team USA to a third-place showing at the April 2011 World Sledge Hockey Challenge in London, Ont.
- In five games, recorded two goals and an assist
- Helped Team USA to a third-place finish at the March 2011 Japan Para Ice Sledge Hockey Championship in Nagano, Japan
- Posted an assist in three games
- Faced Canada once and Japan once in Three Nations Series in November 2010 in Rochester, N.Y.
- Played in three-game series vs. Canada in October 2010 in Toronto, Ont.

=== 2009-10 ===
- At the age of 17, youngest member of the U.S. Paralympic Sled Hockey Team that won the gold medal at the 2010 Paralympic Winter Games in Vancouver, B.C.
- Tallied one assist in five games
- Member of the U.S. National Developmental Sled Hockey Team before joining the U.S. National Sled Hockey Team prior to the 2009 World Sledge Hockey Challenge in Charlottetown, P.E.I.
- Played in all five games

=== 2008-09 ===
- First-year member of the U.S. National Sled Hockey Team
- Helped Team USA to its first IPC Ice Sledge Hockey World Championship gold medal in April 2009 in Ostrava, Czech Republic
- Helped Team USA to a second-place showing at the February 2009 Hockey Canada Cup in Vancouver, B.C.
- Scored his first career goal vs. Germany on Feb. 26, 2009
- Helped Team USA take third place at the November 2008 World Sledge Hockey Challenge in Charlottetown, P.E.I.
