= Jack Wallace (sledge hockey) =

American ice sled hockey player

Personal information
- Born: June 24, 1998 (age 28) Suffern, New York, U.S.
Medal record
Para ice hockey
Representing United States
Paralympic Games
Gold medal – first place	2018 PyeongChang	Team competition
Gold medal – first place	2022 Beijing	Team competition
Gold medal – first place	2026 Milano Cortina	Team competition
World Championships
Gold medal – first place	2019 Ostrava	Team competition
Gold medal – first place	2021 Ostrava	Team competition
Gold medal – first place	2023 Moose Jaw	Team competition
Gold medal – first place	2025 Buffalo	Team competition
Silver medal – second place	2017 Gangneung	Team competition
Silver medal – second place	2024 Calgary	Team competition

Jack Wallace (born June 24, 1998) is an American ice sled hockey player. He was a member of the gold medal-winning US team at the 2018, 2022, and 2026 Winter Paralympics. Jack is a defenseman.

== Career ==
Wallace's disability stems from an amputation of his right leg above the knee after a water skiing accident in youth.

A resident of Nashville, Tennessee, Wallace grew up in Franklin Lakes, New Jersey graduated from Indian Hills High School in 2016. He graduated from The College Of New Jersey (TCNJ) with a BS in Biomedical Engineering in 2020.

At the 2022 Winter Paralympics, he won a second gold medal with Team USA. He was voted best defenseman in the Paralympic tournament. On January 2, 2026, he was named to Team USA's roster for the 2026 Winter Paralympics. During the gold medal game against Canada he had a hat-trick, helping Team USA win their fifth consecutive gold medal in Para ice hockey at the Winter Paralympics.
