= Brody Roybal =

American sledge hockey player

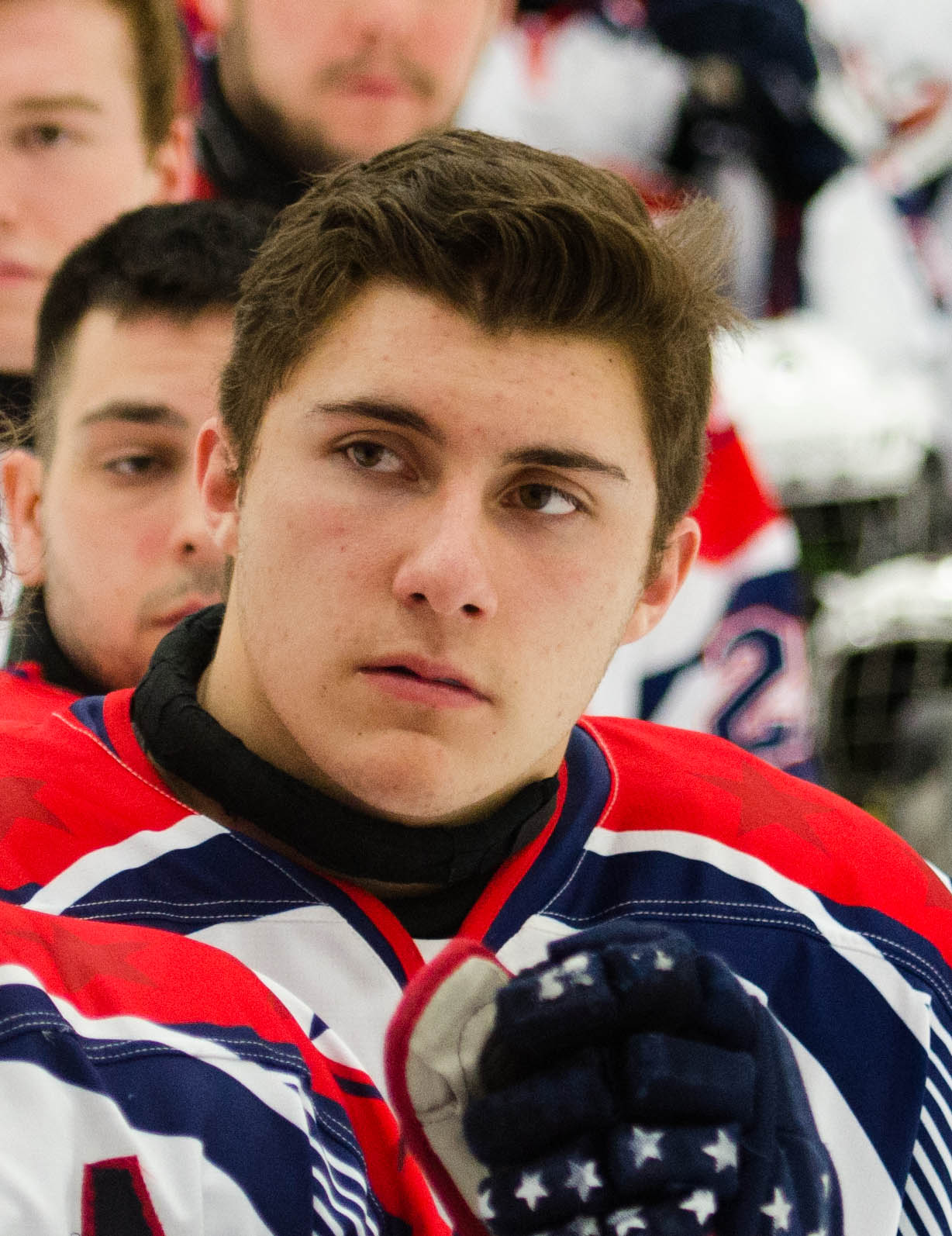
- Roybal in 2015

Personal information
- Born: May 25, 1998 (age 28) Melrose Park, Illinois, U.S.
- Years active: 2006–present
- Height: 3 ft 1 in (94 cm)
- Weight: 120 lb (54 kg)

Sport
- Country: United States
- Sport: Ice sled hockey
- Position: Forward
Medal record
Para ice hockey
Representing United States
Paralympic Games
Gold medal – first place	2014 Sochi	Team competition
Gold medal – first place	2018 PyeongChang	Team competition
Gold medal – first place	2022 Beijing	Team competition
Gold medal – first place	2026 Milano Cortina	Team competition
World Championships
Gold medal – first place	2015 Buffalo	Team competition
Gold medal – first place	2019 Ostrava	Team competition
Gold medal – first place	2021 Ostrava	Team competition
Gold medal – first place	2023 Moose Jaw	Team competition
Gold medal – first place	2025 Buffalo	Team competition
Silver medal – second place	2017 Gangneung	Team competition
Silver medal – second place	2024 Calgary	Team competition

Brody Roybal (born May 25, 1998) is an American ice sled hockey player.

== Early life and career ==
Roybal was born in Melrose Park, Illinois. He is a congenital amputee, missing both legs through the hip joint, meaning he has no leg stumps. He won a gold medal with the American team at the 2014, 2018 and 2022 Winter Paralympics.

On January 2, 2026, he was named to Team USA's roster for the 2026 Winter Paralympics. He won a gold medal, Team USA's fifth consecutive gold medal in Para ice hockey at the Winter Paralympics.
