= Malik Jones =

Malik Jones may refer to:

- Malik Yusef or Malik Jones, American spoken word artist and songwriter
- Malik Jones (sledge hockey), American ice sledge hockey player
