= Auren Halbert =

Canadian ice sledge hockey player (born 2002)

Personal information
- Full name: Auren Halbert
- Born: December 3, 2002 (age 23)
- Home town: Calgary, Alberta, Canada

Sport
- Country: Canada
- Sport: Ice sled hockey
- Position: Defense
Medal record
Para ice hockey
Representing Canada
Paralympic Games
Silver medal – second place	2026 Milano Cortina	Team competition
World Championships
Gold medal – first place	2024 Calgary	Team competition
Silver medal – second place	2021 Ostrava	Team competition
Silver medal – second place	2023 Moose Jaw	Team competition
Silver medal – second place	2025 Buffalo	Team competition

Auren Halbert (born December 3, 2002) is a Canadian ice sled hockey player who was a member of the Canada national para ice hockey team that competed at the 2026 Winter Paralympics.

== Career ==
Halbert made his World Para Ice Hockey Championships debut for Canada at the 2021 World Para Ice Hockey Championships, and won a silver medal. He was one of the final members cut from the roster for the 2022 Winter Paralympics. He again represented Canada and won silver medals in 2023 and 2025, and a gold medal at the 2024 World Para Ice Hockey Championships.

On January 20, 2026, he was selected to represent Canada at the 2026 Winter Paralympics. On March 9, 2026, during a preliminary round game against Japan he scored four goals in a 14–0 victory. He won a silver medal, Canada's third consecutive silver medal in Para ice hockey at the Winter Paralympics.

== Personal life ==
Halbert was born with a shortened foot that required amputation. He discovered Para ice hockey at eight years old after seeing it on TV.
