= Declan Farmer =

American ice sledge hockey player

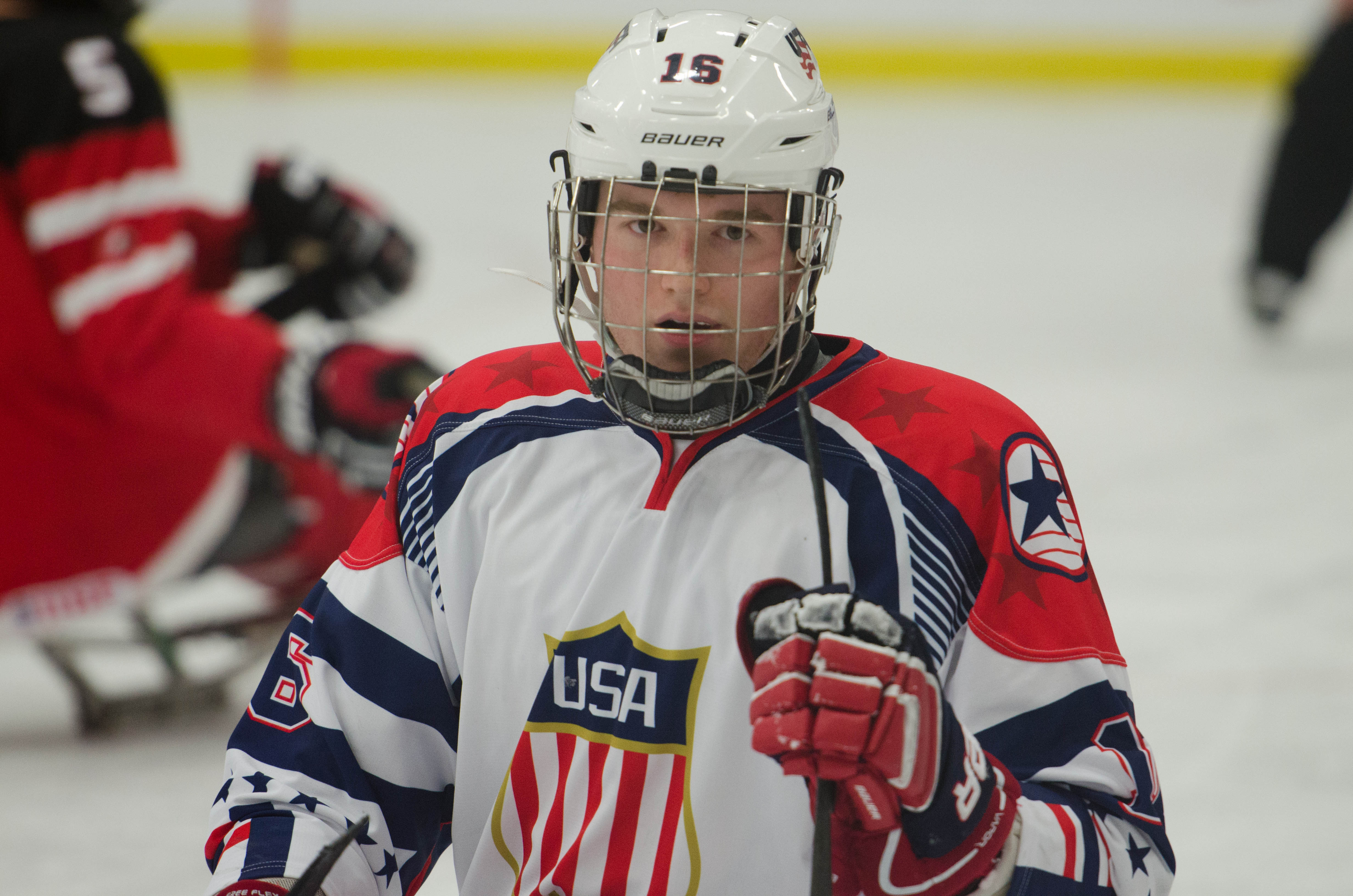
- Farmer in 2015

Personal information
- Full name: Declan Joseph Farmer
- Born: November 5, 1997 (age 28) Tampa, Florida, U.S.
- Years active: 2007–present
- Height: 6 ft 2 in (188 cm)
- Weight: 145 lb (66 kg)

Sport
- Country: United States
- Sport: Ice sled hockey Paracanoeing
- Position: Forward
Medal record
Para ice hockey
Representing United States
Paralympic Games
Gold medal – first place	2014 Sochi	Team
Gold medal – first place	2018 Pyeongchang	Team
Gold medal – first place	2022 Beijing	Team
Gold medal – first place	2026 Milano Cortina	Team
World Championships
Gold medal – first place	2015 Buffalo	Team
Gold medal – first place	2019 Ostrava	Team
Gold medal – first place	2021 Ostrava	Team
Gold medal – first place	2023 Moose Jaw	Team
Gold medal – first place	2025 Buffalo	Team
Silver medal – second place	2013 Goyang	Team
Silver medal – second place	2017 Gangneung	Team
Silver medal – second place	2024 Calgary	Team

Declan Farmer (born November 5, 1997) is an American ice sled hockey player and Paralympic gold medalist. He won a gold medal in ice sled hockey at the 2014, 2018, 2022 and 2026 Winter Paralympics.

== Career ==
A bilateral amputee, he has played sled hockey since the age of nine after first trying it out in Clearwater, Florida. He attended Berkeley Preparatory School in Tampa and graduated from Princeton University in 2020. In addition to the United States men's national team, he has played on the Spacecoast Hurricanes, Tampa Bay Lightning, and Florida Bandits sledge hockey clubs. He made the American national team at the age of 14 in 2012. He is also the recipient of the best disabled male athlete at the 2014 and 2026 ESPY awards.

In the 2013 IPC Ice Sledge Hockey World Championships, he finished first on the American team in scoring, with eight points. Farmer won his second Paralympic gold medal in 2018, while being the tournament's leading scorer. He won his third gold medal at the 2022 Winter Paralympics.

On January 2, 2026, he was named to Team USA's roster for the 2026 Winter Paralympics. He won a gold medal, Team USA's fifth consecutive gold medal in Para ice hockey at the Winter Paralympics.

Since 2026 he has also competed in paracanoeing.
