= Travis Dodson =

American ice sledge hockey player (born 1985)

Personal information
- Born: October 14, 1985 (age 40) Silver City, New Mexico, U.S.
Medal record
Para ice hockey
Representing United States
Paralympic Games
Gold medal – first place	2018 Pyeongchang	Team competition
Gold medal – first place	2022 Beijing	Team competition
Gold medal – first place	2026 Milano Cortina	Team competition
World Championships
Gold medal – first place	2019 Ostrava	Team competition
Gold medal – first place	2021 Ostrava	Team competition
Gold medal – first place	2023 Moose Jaw	Team competition
Gold medal – first place	2025 Buffalo	Team competition
Silver medal – second place	2024 Calgary	Team competition

Travis Dodson (born October 14, 1985, in Silver City, New Mexico) is a retired Marine and Paralympian from Deming, New Mexico. Dodson served in the United States Marine Corps and was wounded in action by a hand grenade in the Iraq War in 2007.

== Career ==
He competed for the United States at the 2014 Winter Paralympics in cross-country skiing (Men's 1 km Sprint Classic and Men's 10 km) and biathlon (Men's 7.5 km and Men's 15 km). At the 2018 Winter Paralympics he had switched to para ice hockey. He was on the gold medal-winning team.

On January 2, 2026, he was named to Team USA's roster for the 2026 Winter Paralympics. He won a gold medal, Team USA's fifth consecutive gold medal in Para ice hockey at the Winter Paralympics.
