= 2025 World Para Ice Hockey Championships =

Tournament details
- Host country: United States
- Venue(s): LECOM Harborcenter, Buffalo
- Dates: May 24–31
- Teams: 8

Final positions
- Champions: United States (7th title)
- Runners-up: Canada
- Third place: Czechia
- Fourth place: China

Tournament statistics
- Games played: 20
- Goals scored: 134 (6.7 per game)
- Attendance: 3,634 (182 per game)
- Scoring leader: (United States) Declan Farmer (21 points)

Awards
- MVP: (United States) Declan Farmer

Official website
- Buffalo 2025

The 2025 World Para Ice Hockey Championships was the 14th edition of World Para Ice Hockey Championships (originally named IPC Ice Sledge Hockey World Championships) held in 2025. The tournament was hosted in Buffalo, New York, in the United States from 24 to 31 May. The top five teams from the championship qualified for the 2026 Winter Paralympics.

The United States won their seventh title, defeating Canada 6–1 in the final.

== Format ==
The teams were divided into two groups based on their ranking, however contrary to previous years, the top two teams in each group advanced to the semifinals. The bottom two teams in each group played in the 5–8th place semifinals.

== Venue ==
The venue was the LECOM Harborcenter in Buffalo.

| 2025 World Para Ice Hockey Championships is located in the United States | Buffalo |
|---|---|
| 2025 World Para Ice Hockey Championships is located in the United States | LECOM Harborcenter |

== Teams ==
Germany and Norway were promoted to Pool A, securing an immediate return to the top division. For the first time, Slovakia survived relegation and competed at their second consecutive tournament.

| Team | Qualification method | Appearance(s) | | | | Previous best performance (Note: Bold text indicates they hosted that edition.) |
| Team | Qualification method | Total (Note: In Division A. Results in Pool B are excluded.) | First | Last | Streak | Previous best performance |
|---|---|---|---|---|---|---|
| Canada | First in 2024 | 14th | 1996 | 2024 | 14 | Champions (2000, 2008, 2013, 2017, 2024) |
| United States | Second in 2024 and hosts | 14th | 1996 | 2024 | 14 | Champions (2009, 2012, 2015, 2019, 2021, 2023) |
| Czechia | Third in 2024 | 9th | 2009 | 2024 | 5 | Third place (2021, 2023, 2024) |
| China | Fourth in 2024 | 3rd | 2023 | 2024 | 3 | Fourth place (2023, 2024) |
| South Korea | Fifth in 2024 | 10th | 2008 | 2024 | 6 | Runners-up (2012) |
| Slovakia | Sixth in 2024 | 3rd | 2021 | 2024 | 2 | Sixth place (2023) |
| Norway | Winner of Pool B | 13th | 1996 | 2023 | 1 | Champions (2004) |
| Germany | Runners-up of Pool B | 7th | 2004 | 2023 | 1 | Fifth place (2008) |

== Notes ==
=== Groups composition ===
The serpentine system was used to organise the groups.

Group A

- Canada (1st)
- China (4th)
- South Korea (5th)
- Germany (2nd in Pool B)

Group B

- United States (2nd)
- Czechia (3rd)
- Slovakia (6th)
- Norway (1st in Pool B)

== Preliminary round ==
The schedule was announced on 30 January 2025. On 29 April 2025, the referees were confirmed. All times are local (UTC−4).

=== Group A ===
| Pos | Team | Pld | W | OTW | OTL | L | GF | GA | GD | Pts | Qualification |
|---|---|---|---|---|---|---|---|---|---|---|---|
| 1 | Canada | 3 | 3 | 0 | 0 | 0 | 27 | 2 | +25 | **9** | Semifinals |
| 2 | China | 3 | 2 | 0 | 0 | 1 | 16 | 7 | +9 | **6** | Semifinals |
| 3 | Germany | 3 | 0 | 1 | 0 | 2 | 3 | 21 | −18 | **2** | 5–8th place semifinals |
| 4 | South Korea | 3 | 0 | 0 | 1 | 2 | 5 | 21 | −16 | **1** | 5–8th place semifinals |

Source: IPC

| 24 May 2025; 17:00 | **Canada** | **11–0** (1–0, 4–0, 6–0) | Germany | LECOM Harborcenter, Buffalo; Attendance: 163 |

Game reference
| 2 min | Penalties | 6 min |
| 32 | Shots | 3 |

| 24 May 2025; 20:30 | **China** | **6–3** (2–1, 0–2, 4–0) | South Korea | LECOM Harborcenter, Buffalo; Attendance: 54 |

Game reference
| 12 min | Penalties | 8 min |
| 30 | Shots | 7 |

| 25 May 2025; 17:00 | South Korea | **0–12** (0–8, 0–3, 0–1) | **Canada** | LECOM Harborcenter, Buffalo; Attendance: 64 |

Game reference
| 12 min | Penalties | 2 min |
| 2 | Shots | 36 |

| 25 May 2025; 20:30 | **China** | **8–0** (3–0, 5–0, 0–0) | Germany | LECOM Harborcenter, Buffalo; Attendance: 49 |

Game reference
| 8 min | Penalties | 12 min |
| 35 | Shots | 4 |

| 27 May 2025; 10:00 | **Canada** | **4–2** (1–1, 0–0, 3–1) | China | LECOM Harborcenter, Buffalo; Attendance: 88 |

Game reference
| 18 min | Penalties | 8 min |
| 25 | Shots | 15 |

| 27 May 2025; 20:30 | **Germany** | **3–2 OT** (1–2, 1–0, 0–0) (OT: 1–0) | South Korea | LECOM Harborcenter, Buffalo; Attendance: 34 |

Game reference
| 8 min | Penalties | 8 min |
| 20 | Shots | 18 |

=== Group B ===
| Pos | Team | Pld | W | OTW | OTL | L | GF | GA | GD | Pts | Qualification |
|---|---|---|---|---|---|---|---|---|---|---|---|
| 1 | United States (H) | 3 | 3 | 0 | 0 | 0 | 29 | 3 | +26 | **9** | Semifinals |
| 2 | Czechia | 3 | 2 | 0 | 0 | 1 | 13 | 5 | +8 | **6** | Semifinals |
| 3 | Slovakia | 3 | 1 | 0 | 0 | 2 | 5 | 20 | −15 | **3** | 5–8th place semifinals |
| 4 | Norway | 3 | 0 | 0 | 0 | 3 | 1 | 20 | −19 | **0** | 5–8th place semifinals |

Source: IPC
(H) Host

| 24 May 2025; 10:00 | **Czechia** | **6–1** (2–0, 1–1, 3–0) | Slovakia | LECOM Harborcenter, Buffalo; Attendance: 61 |

Game reference
| 6 min | Penalties | 2 min |
| 29 | Shots | 4 |

| 24 May 2025; 13:30 | **United States** | **12–0** (3–0, 8–0, 1–0) | Norway | LECOM Harborcenter, Buffalo; Attendance: 212 |

Game reference
| 0 min | Penalties | 2 min |
| 33 | Shots | 4 |

| 25 May 2025; 10:00 | **Czechia** | **4–0** (2–0, 1–0, 1–0) | Norway | LECOM Harborcenter, Buffalo; Attendance: 36 |

Game reference
| 10 min | Penalties | 10 min |
| 35 | Shots | 8 |

| 25 May 2025; 13:30 | Slovakia | **0–13** (0–5, 0–2, 0–6) | **United States** | LECOM Harborcenter, Buffalo; Attendance: 133 |

Game reference
| 2 min | Penalties | 2 min |
| 2 | Shots | 34 |

| 27 May 2025; 13:30 | **United States** | **4–3** (2–0, 2–1, 0–2) | Czechia | LECOM Harborcenter, Buffalo; Attendance: 211 |

Game reference
| 4 min | Penalties | 0 min |
| 29 | Shots | 14 |

| 27 May 2025; 17:00 | Norway | **1–4** (0–0, 0–2, 1–2) | **Slovakia** | LECOM Harborcenter, Buffalo; Attendance: 98 |

Game reference
| 14 min | Penalties | 8 min |
| 17 | Shots | 17 |

== Knockout stage ==
=== Bracket ===
Semifinals
30 May
**United States** | **6**
China | 1
30 May
**Canada** | **3**
Czechia | 0

Final
31 May
**United States** | **6**
Canada | 1
Third place
31 May
China | 1
**Czechia (OT)** | **2**

5–8th place semifinals
28 May
**Slovakia (OT)** | **1**
South Korea | 0
28 May
**Germany** | **3**
Norway | 1

Fifth place
30 May
Slovakia | 2
**Germany** | **5**
Seventh place
30 May
**South Korea** | **2**
Norway | 1

=== 5–8th place semifinals ===
| 28 May 2025; 13:30 | **Germany** | **3–1** (2–1, 0–0, 1–0) | Norway | LECOM Harborcenter, Buffalo; Attendance: 72 |

Game reference
| 6 min | Penalties | 0 min |
| 18 | Shots | 20 |

| 28 May 2025; 17:00 | **Slovakia** | **1–0 OT** (0–0, 0–0, 0–0) (OT: 1–0) | South Korea | LECOM Harborcenter, Buffalo; Attendance: 62 |

Game reference
| 8 min | Penalties | 10 min |
| 19 | Shots | 6 |

=== Semifinals ===
| 30 May 2025; 13:30 | **Canada** | **3–0** (2–0, 1–0, 0–0) | Czechia | LECOM Harborcenter, Buffalo; Attendance: 207 |

Game reference
| 12 min | Penalties | 10 min |
| 25 | Shots | 8 |

| 30 May 2025; 17:00 | **United States** | **6–1** (1–0, 4–1, 1–0) | China | LECOM Harborcenter, Buffalo; Attendance: 302 |

Game reference
| 10 min | Penalties | 12 min |
| 30 | Shots | 9 |

=== Seventh place game ===
| 30 May 2025; 20:30 | **South Korea** | **2–1** (1–0, 1–0, 0–1) | Norway | LECOM Harborcenter, Buffalo; Attendance: 43 |

Game reference
| 6 min | Penalties | 14 min |
| 14 | Shots | 16 |

=== Fifth place game ===
| 30 May 2025; 10:00 | Slovakia | **2–5** (0–1, 1–2, 1–2) | **Germany** | LECOM Harborcenter, Buffalo; Attendance: 31 |

Game reference
| 6 min | Penalties | 29 min |
| 14 | Shots | 22 |

=== Bronze medal game ===
| 31 May 2025; 12:30 | China | **1–2 OT** (0–1, 1–0, 0–0) (OT: 0–1) | **Czechia** | LECOM Harborcenter, Buffalo; Attendance: 198 |

Game reference
| 4 min | Penalties | 4 min |
| 15 | Shots | 18 |

=== Gold medal game ===
| 31 May 2025; 16:00 | **United States** | **6–1** (3–1, 1–0, 2–0) | Canada | LECOM Harborcenter, Buffalo; Attendance: 1,516 |

Game reference

Griffin LaMarre
Goalies
Adam Kingsmill
Referee:
(Canada) Patrick Myers
Linesmen:
(Canada) Dylan Dauphinee
(Finland) Lari Niittylä

| Farmer (Roybal, Wallace) (PP) – 02:42 | 1–0 |
| Wallace (Roybal, Jones) – 03:49 | 2–0 |
| | 2–1 | 05:09 – Hickey (McGregor, Cozzolino) |
| Pauls (Roybal) – 10:54 | 3–1 |
| Wallace (Roybal, Farmer) – 20:10 | 4–1 |
| Wallace (Roybal, Grove) – 36:46 | 5–1 |
| Misiewicz (Farmer, Grove) (PP) – 38:00 | 6–1 |

6 min
Penalties
6 min
24
Shots
11

== Final standings ==
The top five teams from the championship qualified for the 2026 Winter Paralympics. Those teams were United States, Canada, Czechia, China and Germany.

| Pos | Grp | Team | Pld | W | OTW | OTL | L | GF | GA | GD | Pts | Final result |
|---|---|---|---|---|---|---|---|---|---|---|---|---|
| 1 | B | United States (H) | 5 | 5 | 0 | 0 | 0 | 41 | 5 | +36 | 15 | Champions |
| 2 | A | Canada | 5 | 4 | 0 | 0 | 1 | 31 | 8 | +23 | 12 | Runners-up |
| 3 | B | Czechia | 5 | 2 | 1 | 0 | 2 | 15 | 9 | +6 | 8 | Third place |
| 4 | A | China | 5 | 2 | 0 | 1 | 2 | 18 | 15 | +3 | 7 | Fourth place |
| 5 | A | Germany | 5 | 2 | 1 | 0 | 2 | 11 | 24 | −13 | 8 | Fifth place game |
| 6 | B | Slovakia | 5 | 1 | 1 | 0 | 3 | 8 | 25 | −17 | 5 | Fifth place game |
| 7 | A | South Korea | 5 | 1 | 0 | 2 | 2 | 7 | 23 | −16 | 5 | Relegated to Pool B |
| 8 | B | Norway | 5 | 0 | 0 | 0 | 5 | 3 | 25 | −22 | 0 | Relegated to Pool B |

Source: IPC
(H) Host

== Medalists ==
| Gold | Silver | Bronze |
|---|---|---|
| United States Kayden Beasley; Liam Cunningham; Travis Dodson; Chris Douglas; David Eustace; Declan Farmer; Noah Grove; Malik Jones; Griffin LaMarre; Jen Lee; Kevin McKee; Josh Misiewicz; Benjamin Musselman; Evan Nichols; Josh Pauls; Brody Roybal; Jack Wallace | Canada Rob Armstrong; Gavin Baggs; Vincent Boily; Shawn Burnett; Dominic Cozzolino; Adam Dixon; James Dunn; Auren Halbert; Tyrone Henry; Liam Hickey; Anton Jacobs-Webb; Adam Kingsmill; Micah Kovacevich; Zach Lavin; Mathieu Lelièvre; Tyler McGregor; Corbin Watson | Czechia Pavel Doležal; Michal Geier; Zdeněk Hábl; Václav Hečko; Lukáš Kapko; Pavel Kubeš; Alex Ohar; David Ondrák; Patrik Sedláček; Michal Vápenka; Filip Veselý; Radek Zelinka; Martin Žižlavský |

== Pool B ==
2025 World Para Ice Hockey Championships Pool B
Tournament details
- Host country: Kazakhstan
- Venue(s): Terlan Arena, Astana
- Dates: 6–11 September
- Teams: 6

Final positions
- Champions: Italy (1st title)
- Runners-up: Japan

Official website
- Astana 2025

Pool B was hosted in Astana, Kazakhstan at the Terlan Arena.

=== Participants ===
| Team | Qualification |
|---|---|
| Italy | Seventh and relegated from Pool A in 2024. |
| Japan | Eighth and relegated from Pool A in 2024. |
| Sweden | Placed 3rd in Pool B in 2024. |
| Kazakhstan | Placed 4th in Pool B in 2024. **Host** |
| France | Placed 5th in Pool B in 2024. |
| Finland | Placed 1st in Pool C in 2024 and was promoted. |

=== Results ===
| Pos | Team | Pld | W | OTW | OTL | L | GF | GA | GD | Pts | Qualification or relegation |
|---|---|---|---|---|---|---|---|---|---|---|---|
| 1 | Italy | 5 | 5 | 0 | 0 | 0 | 58 | 3 | +55 | 15 | Advanced to Pool A |
| 2 | Japan | 5 | 4 | 0 | 0 | 1 | 44 | 5 | +39 | 12 | Advanced to Pool A |
| 3 | Sweden | 5 | 3 | 0 | 0 | 2 | 23 | 12 | +11 | 9 | |
| 4 | Kazakhstan (H) | 5 | 2 | 0 | 0 | 3 | 16 | 26 | −10 | 6 | |
| 5 | Finland | 5 | 1 | 0 | 0 | 4 | 10 | 34 | −24 | 3 | |
| 6 | France | 5 | 0 | 0 | 0 | 5 | 2 | 73 | −71 | 0 | Relegated to Pool C |

Source: Pool B
(H) Host

All times are local (UTC+5).

| 6 September 2025; 12:00 | **Japan** | **20–0** (6–0, 11–0, 3–0) | France | Tarlan Arena, Astana; Attendance: 55 |

Game reference
| 2 min | Penalties | 6 min |
| 56 | Shots | 0 |

| 6 September 2025; 15:30 | Finland | **0–11** (0–2, 0–5, 0–4) | **Italy** | Tarlan Arena, Astana; Attendance: 51 |

Game reference
| 10 min | Penalties | 0 min |
| 2 | Shots | 58 |

| 6 September 2025; 19:00 | **Sweden** | **4–2** (0–1, 2–1, 2–0) | Kazakhstan | Tarlan Arena, Astana; Attendance: 205 |

Game reference
| 6 min | Penalties | 12 min |
| 23 | Shots | 15 |

| 7 September 2025; 12:00 | **Sweden** | **5–1** (3–0, 1–1, 1–0) | Finland | Tarlan Arena, Astana; Attendance: 45 |

Game reference
| 2 min | Penalties | 2 min |
| 20 | Shots | 5 |

| 7 September 2025; 15:30 | France | **0–25** (0–9, 0–13, 0–3) | **Italy** | Tarlan Arena, Astana; Attendance: 48 |

Game reference
| 6 min | Penalties | 2 min |
| 1 | Shots | 57 |

| 7 September 2025; 19:00 | **Japan** | **6–0** (2–0, 3–0, 1–0) | Kazakhstan | Tarlan Arena, Astana; Attendance: 85 |

Game reference
| 46 min | Penalties | 41 min |
| 19 | Shots | 6 |

| 8 September 2025; 12:00 | France | **1–7** (0–4, 1–1, 0–2) | **Finland** | Tarlan Arena, Astana; Attendance: 35 |

Game reference
| 4 min | Penalties | 2 min |
| 7 | Shots | 28 |

| 8 September 2025; 15:30 | **Japan** | **4–1** (2–0, 0–1, 2–0) | Sweden | Tarlan Arena, Astana; Attendance: 45 |

Game reference
| 8 min | Penalties | 4 min |
| 11 | Shots | 15 |

| 8 September 2025; 19:00 | **Italy** | **13–1** (5–0, 4–0, 4–1) | Kazakhstan | Tarlan Arena, Astana; Attendance: 65 |

Game reference
| 4 min | Penalties | 8 min |
| 38 | Shots | 10 |

| 10 September 2025; 12:00 | Finland | **0–12** (0–2, 0–3, 0–7) | **Japan** | Tarlan Arena, Astana; Attendance: 38 |

Game reference
| 4 min | Penalties | 2 min |
| 7 | Shots | 35 |

| 10 September 2025; 15:30 | **Italy** | **5–0** (1–0, 2–0, 2–0) | Sweden | Tarlan Arena, Astana; Attendance: 35 |

Game reference
| 2 min | Penalties | 8 min |
| 29 | Shots | 3 |

| 10 September 2025; 19:00 | **Kazakhstan** | **8–1** (3–0, 4–1, 1–0) | France | Tarlan Arena, Astana; Attendance: 175 |

Game reference
| 2 min | Penalties | 4 min |
| 37 | Shots | 4 |

| 11 September 2025; 12:00 | **Sweden** | **13–0** (9–0, 1–0, 3–0) | France | Tarlan Arena, Astana; Attendance: 45 |

Game reference
| 6 min | Penalties | 12 min |
| 34 | Shots | 1 |

| 11 September 2025; 15:30 | **Italy** | **4–2** (1–0, 1–2, 2–0) | Japan | Tarlan Arena, Astana; Attendance: 75 |

Game reference
| 2 min | Penalties | 6 min |
| 26 | Shots | 7 |

| 11 September 2025; 19:00 | **Kazakhstan** | **5–2** (1–1, 1–0, 3–1) | Finland | Tarlan Arena, Astana; Attendance: 120 |

Game reference
| 0 min | Penalties | 2 min |
| 29 | Shots | 6 |

== See also ==
- 2025 Women's World Para Ice Hockey Championships
