= Dominic Cozzolino =

Canadian ice sledge hockey player

Personal information
- Born: August 23, 1994 (age 31) Kitchener, Ontario, Canada
Medal record
Para ice hockey
Representing Canada
Paralympic Games
Silver medal – second place	2018 Pyeongchang	Team competition
Silver medal – second place	2026 Milano Cortina	Team competition
World Championships
Gold medal – first place	2017 Gangneung	Team competition
Gold medal – first place	2024 Calgary	Team competition
Silver medal – second place	2019 Ostrava	Team competition
Silver medal – second place	2021 Ostrava	Team competition
Silver medal – second place	2023 Moose Jaw	Team competition
Silver medal – second place	2025 Buffalo	Team competition

Dominic Cozzolino (born August 23, 1994) is a Canadian ice sledge hockey player.

== Career ==
Cozzolino was a member of the silver medal-winning Canadian team of Para ice hockey at the 2018 Winter Paralympics. His role was singled out by Gagan Sikand at Parliament. Cozzolino is a resident of Mississauga. His disability was caused by a spinal fracture while playing able-bodied ice hockey.

He competed at the 2026 Winter Paralympics and won a silver medal, Canada's third consecutive silver medal in Para ice hockey at the Winter Paralympics.
