= Tyler McGregor =

Canadian sledge hockey player

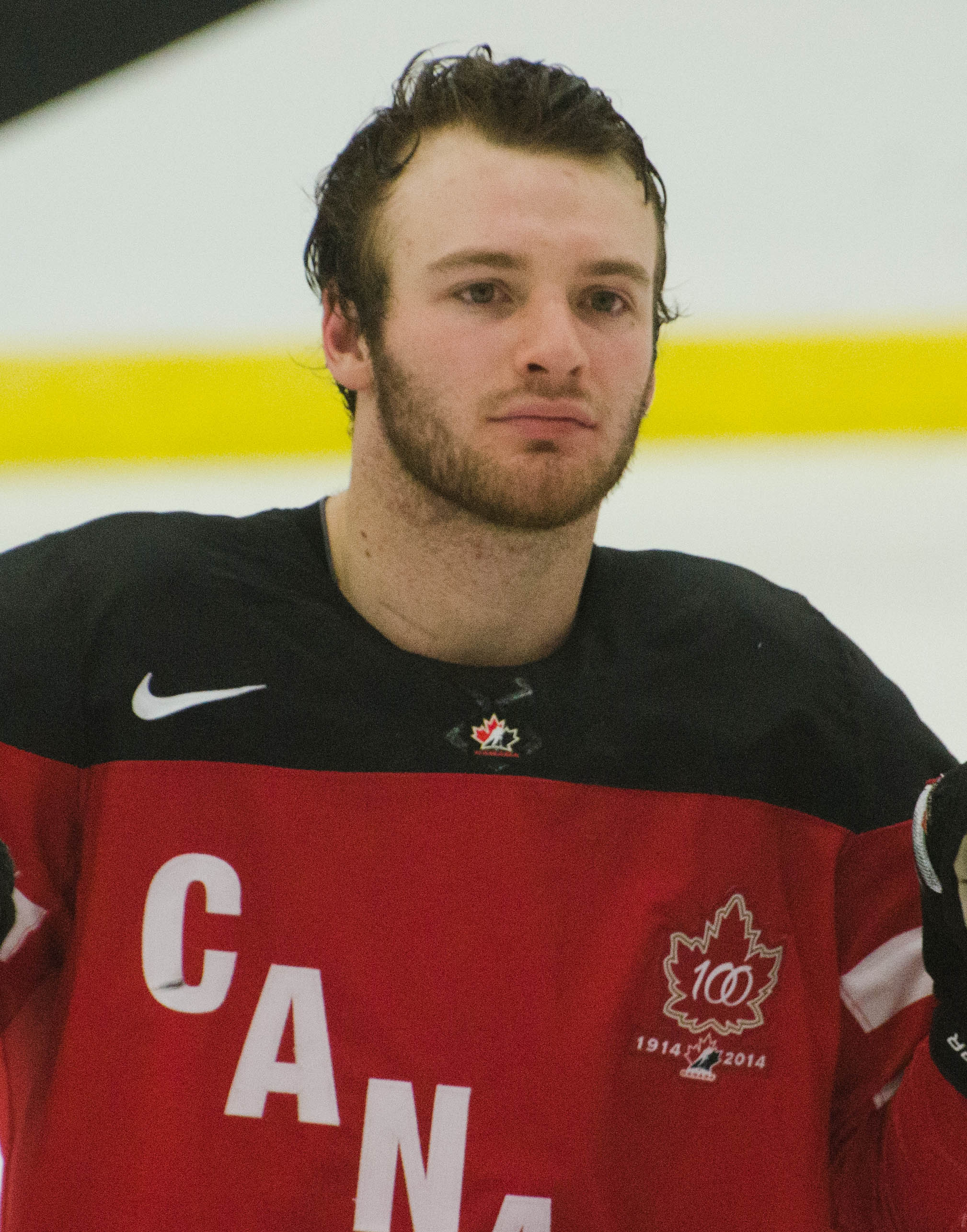
- McGregor in 2015

Personal information
- Born: March 11, 1994 (age 32) Forest, Ontario, Canada
- Years active: 2011–present
- Height: 5 ft 8 in (1.73 m)
- Weight: 153 lb (69 kg)

Sport
- Country: Canada
- Sport: Ice sledge hockey
- Position: Forward
Medal record
Para ice hockey
Representing Canada
Paralympic Games
Silver medal – second place	2018 Pyeongchang	Team competition
Silver medal – second place	2022 Beijing	Team competition
Silver medal – second place	2026 Milano Cortina	Team competition
Bronze medal – third place	2014 Sochi	Team competition
World Championships
Gold medal – first place	2013 Goyang	Team competition
Gold medal – first place	2017 Gangneung	Team competition
Gold medal – first place	2024 Calgary	Team competition
Silver medal – second place	2015 Buffalo	Team competition
Silver medal – second place	2019 Ostrava	Team competition
Silver medal – second place	2021 Ostrava	Team competition
Silver medal – second place	2023 Moose Jaw	Team competition
Silver medal – second place	2025 Buffalo	Team competition

Tyler McGregor (born March 11, 1994) is a Canadian sledge hockey player, and captain of Canada’s national para hockey team.

== Early life ==
McGregor was born in Forest, Ontario on March 11, 1994, to parents Dean and Trudy. Growing up in Forest, Ontario, he started playing ice hockey when he was three years old and advanced to able-bodied AAA hockey, breaking his leg in a game in 2009 which ultimately led to a diagnosis of spindle cell sarcoma, a form of bone cancer. As a result, in January 2010 McGregor underwent eight months of chemotherapy and the amputation of his left leg above the knee.

== Career ==
Upon concluding treatment, McGregor was encouraged to try out sledge hockey by his former coaches. He started playing with a standing amputee team but soon switched to sledge hockey. McGregor began playing sledge hockey in 2011 and made the Canadian men's national para ice hockey team in 2012. In his international debut at the age of 18, he recorded a goal and two assists to help Team Canada win a silver medal at the 2012 World Sledge Hockey Challenge. The following year, McGregor became the youngest member of Team Canada to win a gold medal at the 2013 IPC Ice Sledge Hockey World Championships.

As a result of his success, McGregor was the second-youngest player named to Team Canada’s sledge hockey team for the 2014 Winter Paralympics, where he won a bronze medal. Following this, he collected 11 goals and 10 assists in six games during the 2015 International Ice Sledge Hockey Tournament to win a gold medal.

As a member of Team Canada at the 2017 World Para Ice Hockey Championships, McGregor recorded 12 goals to tie as the tournament leader and win a gold medal. Following the tournament, McGregor served as an alternate captain to bring Canada to a silver medal at the 2018 Winter Paralympics. In 2019 he was named captain of the national para hockey team, winning silver at the 2022 Beijing Winter Paralympics, and silver at the 2019, 2021 and 2023 world championships.

He competed at the 2026 Winter Paralympics and won a silver medal, Canada's third consecutive silver medal in Para ice hockey at the Winter Paralympics.
