= Corbyn Smith =

Canadian ice sledge hockey player

Personal information
- Born: 5 August 1998 (age 27)
Medal record
Para ice hockey
Representing Canada
Paralympic Games
Silver medal – second place	2018 Pyeongchang	Team competition
World Championships
Gold medal – first place	2017 Gangneung	Team competition
Silver medal – second place	2019 Ostrava	Team competition
Silver medal – second place	2021 Ostrava	Team competition
Silver medal – second place	2023 Moose Jaw	Team competition

Corbyn Smith (born 5 August 1998) is a Canadian ice sledge hockey player.

== Career ==
Smith represented Canada at the 2018 Winter Paralympics in para ice hockey and won a silver medal.

== Personal life ==
As a child he had a neuroblastoma, which affected his abdomen and spine.
