= Temple Gardens Centre =

Multi-use indoor arena in Moose Jaw, Saskatchewan

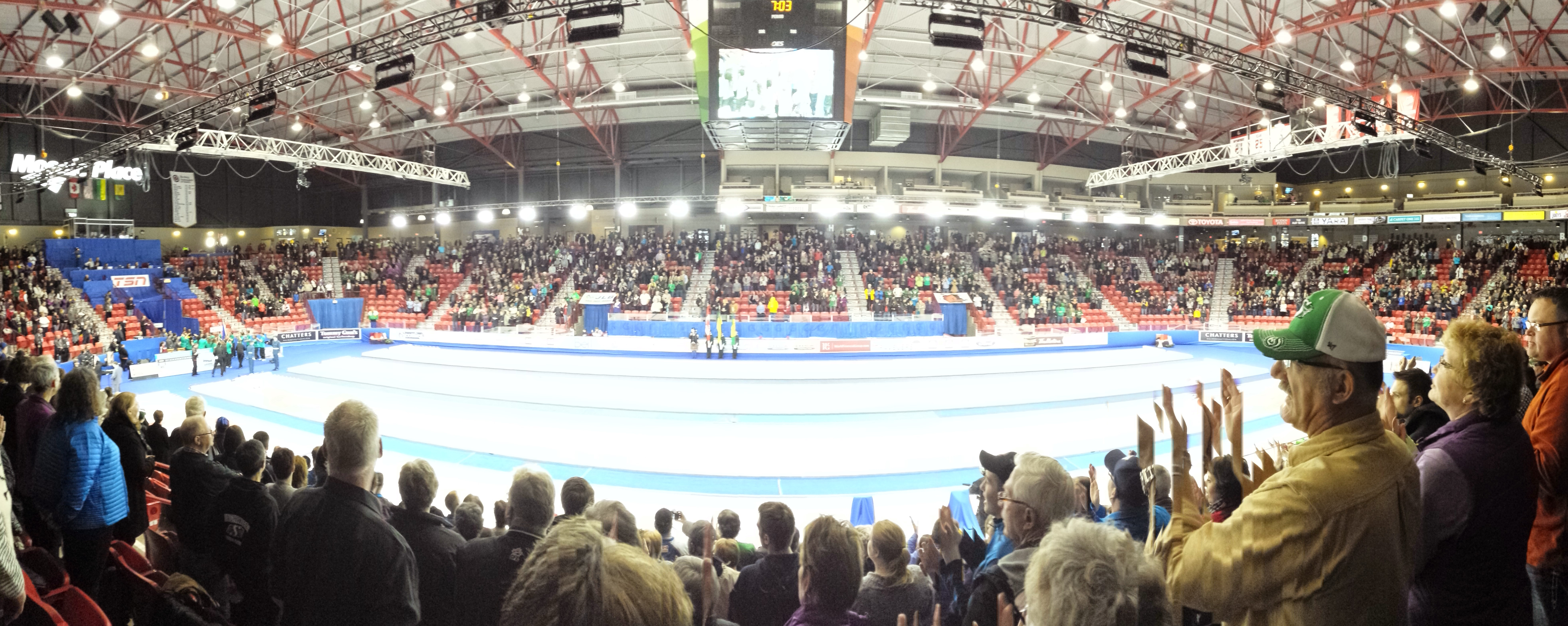
- During the 2015 Scotties Tournament of Hearts

- Location within Saskatchewan Location within Canada
- Former names: Mosaic Place (2011–2022); Moose Jaw Events Centre (2022–2025)
- Location: 110 1st Avenue NW; Moose Jaw, Saskatchewan; S6H 0Y8
- Coordinates: 50°23′26.16″N 105°32′18.94″W
- Owner: City of Moose Jaw
- Operator: Moose Jaw Downtown & Field House Facilities Non-Profit Board
- Capacity: Ice hockey: 4,414 (4,714 with standing room); Concerts: 5,000+
- Executive suites: 21

Construction
- Groundbreaking: July 9, 2009
- Opened: August 19, 2011
- Cost: $61.2 million ($83.9 million in 2025 dollars)
- Architects: McDonell Quiring Neumann Architects; PSW Architects
- Project managers: MHPM Project Managers, Inc.
- Structural engineers: John Bryson & Partners
- Services engineers: Sterling, Cooper & Associates
- General contractor: Ventana Construction Corporation

Tenant
- Moose Jaw Warriors (WHL) (2011–present)

Website
- https://www.templegardenscentre.ca/

Temple Gardens Centre (formerly Mosaic Place) is a multi-purpose arena in Moose Jaw, Saskatchewan, Canada. It hosts ice hockey and curling events and is home to the Moose Jaw Warriors of the Western Hockey League. It opened on August 19, 2011 and seats upwards of 4,414 spectators. It replaced the Warriors' former arena, the Moose Jaw Civic Centre.

== History ==
By the early 2000s, the Moose Jaw Civic Centre faced criticism that it was too small and not up to standards for the Warriors hockey team. A civic referendum in 2006 approved construction of a new $36.3 million arena, with the city contributing $15 million. Soon after, plans emerged for a more ambitious $61.2 million facility, with $36.5 million coming from the city. A group of citizens sued the city, claiming that the referendum vote in 2006 did not allow the city to spend more than the original amount. The case was dismissed, and civic voters approved the project again in 2009 with a second referendum.

The entire project cost about $61 million, with the city of Moose Jaw paying $34.5 million. Provincial and federal governments paid $8 million and community fundraising committed to $10 million. Groundbreaking for the new facility took place on July 9, 2009. In August 2011, the naming rights were sold to The Mosaic Company under a ten-year agreement, naming the arena Mosaic Place. The arena was opened to the public on August 19, 2011, while the Moose Jaw Warriors played their first home opener on September 23—losing to the Brandon Wheat Kings.

The naming rights were renewed into 2022, and expired on August 31, 2022; the Mosaic branding was removed, and the arena adopted the non-sponsored name Moose Jaw Events Centre until such time a new naming rights agreement was reached. In March 2025, the naming rights were acquired by Peepeekisis Developments, Ltd., owners of the downtown Temple Gardens Hotel & Spa, under a five-year deal renaming the arena Temple Gardens Centre.

=== Events ===
Major events hosted by Temple Gardens Centre

2011 — Holiday Festival On Ice featuring Kurt Browning, Western Canadian Under-16 Challenge Cup, Subway Series WHL All Stars vs Russian U-20 team.

2012 — Paul Brandt, John Mellencamp, Simple Plan, Nitty Gritty Dirt Band, Alice Cooper, Cesar Millan, Moscow Ballet, Capital One Canada Cup of Curling.

2013 — Marilyn Manson, FMX Free Style Canadian Championship, Terri Clark, Billy Talent with Sum 41, Marianas Trench with Down With Webster, JUNO Cup, Mötley Crüe with Big Wreck, Carrie Underwood, Tragically Hip, Great Big Sea, Moscow Ballet's Great Russian Nutcracker.

2014 — Larry the Cable Guy, Telus Cup – Midget AAA (Major) national hockey championship, Chicago, Alan Jackson, Brad Paisley, Blue Rodeo, Dean Brody with Cassadee Pope, ZZ Top, Back Street Boys with Victoria Duffield, Doobie Brothers, John Fogerty, Avenged Sevenfold, ABBA the tribute, and Holiday Festival on Ice, starring Kurt Browning.

2015 — 2015 Scotties Tournament of Hearts (Canada's national women's curling championship), Counting Crows, Toby Keith, Wiz Khalifa, Tenors, Bret Michaels, Three Days Grace & STYX.

2016 — Disturbed, Megadeth, Jeff Dunham, Lord of the Dance, The Price is Right, PBR (Professional Bull Riding) and Meat Loaf.

2020 — 2020 Scotties Tournament of Hearts (Canada's national women's curling championship).

2023 — 2023 World Para Ice Hockey Championships

2024 — 2024 Ed Chynoweth Cup Finals (Games 3 & 4)

2025 — 2025 BKT Tires World Men's Curling Championship
