= Kevin McKee (sledge hockey) =

American ice sled hockey player

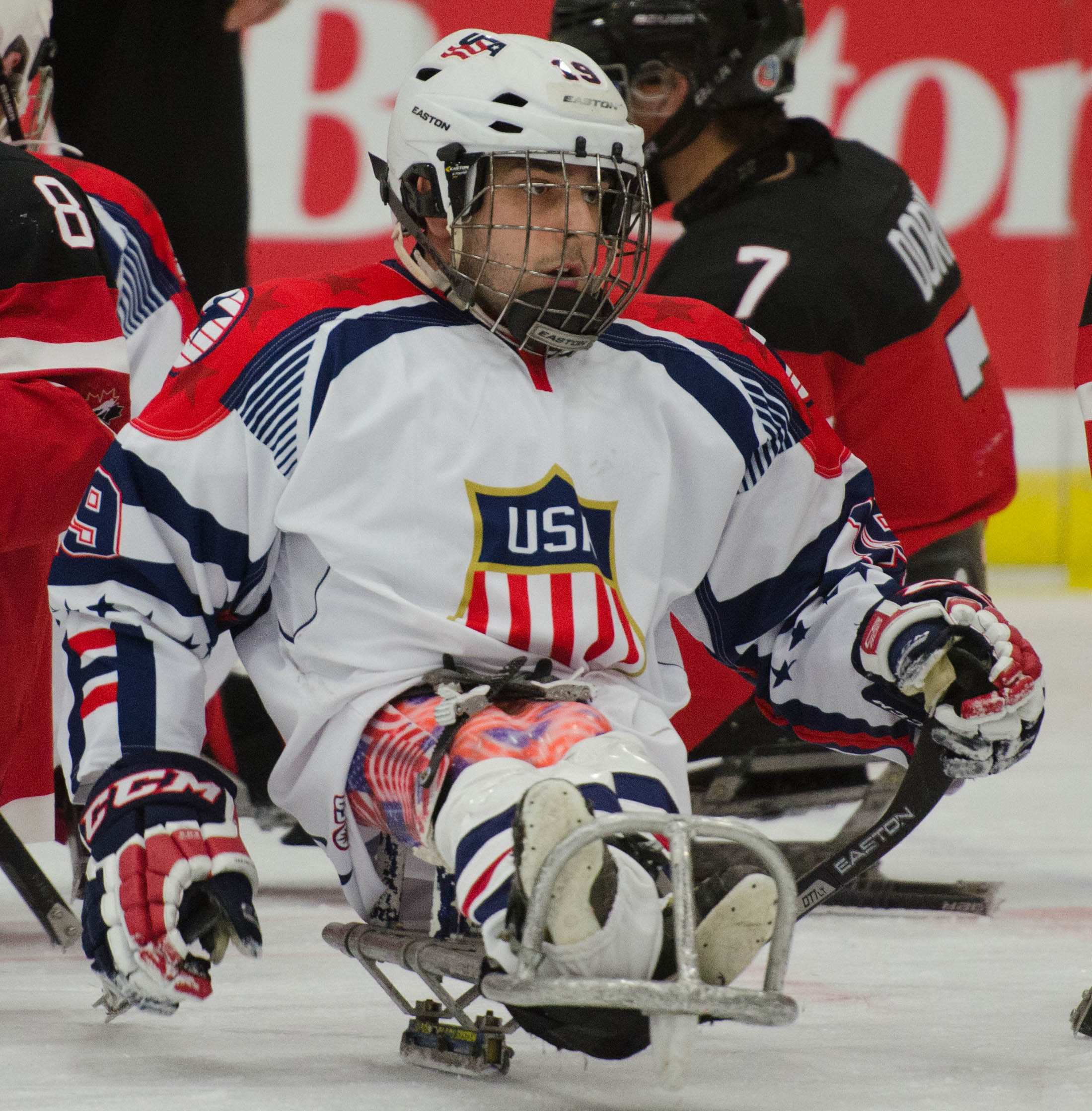
- McKee in 2015

Personal information
- Born: February 11, 1990 (age 36) Davenport, Iowa, United States
- Years active: 2000–present
- Height: 4 ft 7 in (140 cm)
- Weight: 117 lb (53 kg)

Sport
- Country: United States
- Sport: Ice sledge hockey
- Position: Forward
Medal record
Para ice hockey
Representing the United States
Paralympic Games
Gold medal – first place	2014 Sochi	Team competition
Gold medal – first place	2018 PyeongChang	Team competition
Gold medal – first place	2022 Beijing	Team competition
Gold medal – first place	2026 Milano Cortina	Team competition
World Championships
Gold medal – first place	2012 Hamar	Team competition
Gold medal – first place	2015 Buffalo	Team competition
Gold medal – first place	2019 Ostrava	Team competition
Gold medal – first place	2021 Ostrava	Team competition
Gold medal – first place	2023 Moose Jaw	Team competition
Gold medal – first place	2025 Buffalo	Team competition
Silver medal – second place	2013 Goyang	Team competition
Silver medal – second place	2017 Gangneung	Team competition
Silver medal – second place	2024 Calgary	Team competition

Kevin McKee (born February 11, 1990) is an American sled hockey player.

== Career ==
McKee was born in Davenport, Iowa. He was born with sacral agenesis. He won a gold medal with the American team at the 2014, 2018, 2022 and 2026 Winter Paralympics.
