= 2023 World Para Ice Hockey Championships =

Tournament details
- Host country: Canada
- Venue(s): Moose Jaw Events Centre, Moose Jaw, Saskatchewan
- Dates: 28 May–4 June
- Teams: 8

Final positions
- Champions: United States (6th title)
- Runners-up: Canada
- Third place: Czech Republic
- Fourth place: China

Official website
- Moose Jaw 2023

The 2023 World Para Ice Hockey Championships was the 12th edition of World Para Ice Hockey Championships (originally named IPC Ice Sledge Hockey World Championships) held in 2023. The tournament was hosted by Moose Jaw, Saskatchewan in Canada from May 28 to June 3. It was the first time Canada has ever hosted the Championships.

The USA won their third straight championship after winning the 2019 and 2021 editions. Team China made their world championship debut while Germany will be in the top pool for the first time since 2017.

== Format ==
The teams are divided into two groups based on their ranking. The top two teams from Group A advance directly into Semi-Finals while the remaining two teams together with the best two teams from Group B advance to the Quarter-Finals.

== Preliminary round ==
All times are local (UTC−6)

Group A features the 2 powerhouses in Canada and the US as well as the teams from Czech Republic and Korea.

In game 1 of the group between Czech and Korea, after a scoreless first period, Korea took a delay of game penalty that lead to a power-play goal by Patrik Sedlacek roughly halfway through the game. the Czechs would add another two minutes later and score again with 3 minutes left in the game to come away with a 3–0 victory. In The second game between the Czechs and USA, Czechia was overmatched by the Americans speed losing 7–1. USA's Travis Dodson led the way with a hat trick. The game between Canada and Korea saw one of the best scoring performances in the championships history with Canada's Dominic Cozzolino picking up 4 goals and 4 assists for 8 points leading the Canadians to a 15–1 win over the Koreans. History was also made as 20 year old Raphaelle Tousignant became the first women to ever play on the Canadian National Sledge Hockey Team. The Americans them took down the Koreans 9–0 with points from the top players like Kevin McKee, Brody Roybal and Declan Farmer. In the Final game of the Round Robin for the Czechs, they gave Canada their hardest competition yet keeping the Canadians to just 2 goals but fell short in the game losing 2–1. Canada and USA played the final game of the round robin for Group A. USA's speed was just too much for the Canadians as USA were victorious 3–0.

=== Group A ===
Pos	Team	Pld	W	OTW	OTL	L	GF	GA	GD	Pts	Qualification
1	United States	3	3	0	0	0	19	1	+18	9	Semifinals
2	Canada (H)	3	2	0	0	1	17	5	+12	6	Semifinals
3	Czechia	3	1	0	0	2	5	9	−4	3	Quarterfinals
4	South Korea	3	0	0	0	3	1	27	−26	0	Quarterfinals

Source: Report
(H) Host

28 May 2023; 11:00	Czechia	3–0 (0–0, 2–0, 1–0)	South Korea	Moose Jaw Events Centre, Canada

Game reference

Martin Kudela
Goalies
Hyuk Jun Choi
Daehan Bong
Referee:
(United States) Bobby Esposito
Linesmen:
(Canada) Dylan Dauphinee
(Sweden) Andreas Lunden

Sedlacek (Geier) (PP) - 24:52	1–0
Hecko unassisted - 26:02	2–0
Geier (Sedlacek) - 42:16	3–0

10 min
Penalties
8 min
36
Shots
6

29 May 2023; 11:00	United States	7–1 (3–0, 2–1, 2–0)	Czechia	Moose Jaw Events Centre, Canada

Game reference

Jen Lee
Goalies
Martin Kudela
Referee:
(Norway) Kenneth Danielsen
Linesmen:
(Canada) Ryan O'Rourke
(Sweden) Tony Rundstrom

Dodson (Eustace, McKee) - 4:06	1–0
Dodson (Douglas, McKee) - 7:25	2–0
Roybal unassisted - 11:59	3–0
Jones (Farmer, Wallace) - 21:11	4–0
Farmer (Roybal) (PP) - 23:29	5–0
	5–1	Vesely unassisted - 24:43
Dodson (McKee) - 37:18	6–1
Grove unassisted (PP) - 42:57	7–1

6 min
Penalties
4 min
29
Shots
10

29 May 2023; 19:00	South Korea	1–15 (0–7, 0–4, 1–4)	Canada	Moose Jaw Events Centre, Canada; Attendance: 1013

Game reference

Hyuk Jun Choi
Daehan Bong
Goalies
Jean-Francois Huneault
Referee:
(Czech Republic) Martin Rapak
Linesmen:
(Norway) Marius Oswold-Hermansen
(Sweden) Andreas Lunden

	0–1	McGregor (Smith, Cozzolino) - 1:23
	0–2	Dunn (Dixon, Cozzolino) (PP) - 3:42
	0–3	Mcgregor (Dominic Cozzolino) - 5:07
	0–4	Cozzolino (McGregor, Dunn) (PP) - 5:58
	0–5	Dunn (Dixon, Lavin) - 10:32
	0–6	Halbert (Jacobs-Webb) (PP) - 13:17
	0–7	Dixon (LeBlanc, Lavin) - 13:58
	0–8	Cozzolino (McGregor, Smith) (PP) - 17:53
	0–9	Lavin (Boily, Jacobs-Webb) (PP) - 20:20
	0–10	Cozzolino (Lavin) - 22:31
	0–11	Cozzolino (McGregor, Smith) - 29:06
	0–12	Smith (Cozzolino) - 34:28
	0–13	Dixon (Dunn) - 34:44
Jung unassisted - 37:17	1–13
	1–14	Boily (LeBlanc) - 40:31
	1–15	Dunn (Dixon, Armstrong) - 41:27

12 min
Penalties
2 min
6
Shots
42

30 May 2023; 15:00	South Korea	0–9 (0–5, 0–4, 0–0)	United States	Moose Jaw Events Centre, Canada; Attendance: 218

Game reference

Daehan Bong
Hyuk Jung Choi
Goalies
Griffin LaMarre
Referee:
(Canada) Matt Fergenbaum
Linesmen:
(Canada) Dylan Dauphinee
(Finland) Lari Niittyla

0–1	Farmer (Jones) - 1:01
0–2	Nichols (Douglas) - 5:31
0–3	Jones (Douglas) - 7:06
0–4	Dodson (Eustace, McKee) - 11:11
0–5	Pauls (Grove) - 13:57
0–6	Eustace (Grove) (SH) 17:24
0–7	Farmer (Grove) - 19:30
0–8	Farmer (Wallace) - 21:58
0–9	Douglas (Dodson) - 24:37

6 min
Penalties
4 min
6
Shots
32

30 May 2023; 19:00	Czechia	1–2 (0–1, 1–1, 0–0)	Canada	Moose Jaw Events Centre, Canada; Attendance: 742

Game reference

Martin Kudela
Goalies
Dominic Larocque
Referee:
(United States) Bobby Esposito
Linesmen:
(Norway) Marius Oswold-Hermansen
(Sweden) Tony Rundstrom

	0–1	McGregor unassisted - 9:35
Zelinka (Geier) (PP) - 17:26	1–1
	1–2	Dixon (McGregor) (PP) - 27:44

4 min
Penalties
2 min
10
Shots
22

31 May 2023; 19:00	Canada	0–3 (0–0, 0–1, 0–2)	United States	Moose Jaw Events Centre, Canada; Attendance: 2784

Game reference

Dominic Larocque
Goalies
Jen Lee
Referee:
(Norway) Kenneth Danielsen
Linesmen:
(United States) Brandon Lewis
(Sweden) Andreas Lunden

0–1	Roybal (Wallace, Musselman) - 24:49
0–2	Wallace (Jones, Misiewicz) (PP) - 41:20
0–3	Dodson ENG unassisted - 43:29

10 min
Penalties
6 min
9
Shots
17

=== Group B ===
In China's world championships debut, they took a 2–1 lead over Italy into the first intermission, but in the second period things got much more one sided as China would score 3 in the second and 5 in the third to win their worlds debut 10–1. Yifeng Shen lead the way with 5 goals for China. In the second game of Group B. Germany and Norway played a back and forth game. After Germany took a 4–1 lead early in the third, Norway scored 2 goals in 2 minutes to cut the lead to one but the Germans would add an empty netter and win 5–3. China would keep rolling in their debut tournament with a 5–1 win over Norway with 2 goals from Shen giving him 7 in 2 games. Italy and Germany played in the closest game in the tournament yet as they went back and forth. regulation and 5 minutes of overtime solved nothing but in the shootout the Italians put in 2 for the 1–0 shootout win. China would finish the round robin with a perfect 3–0 record after beating Germany 7–0. Yifeng Shen had another 4 goals to give him 11 through 3 round robin games. In the final game of group B Italy got outshot greatly by Norway but still came way with a 3–1 win.

Pos	Team	Pld	W	OTW	OTL	L	GF	GA	GD	Pts	Qualification
1	China	3	3	0	0	0	22	2	+20	9	Quarterfinals
2	Italy	3	1	1	0	1	5	11	−6	5	Quarterfinals
3	Germany	3	1	0	1	1	5	11	−6	4	Seventh place game
4	Norway	3	0	0	0	3	5	13	−8	0	Seventh place game

Source: Report

28 May 2023; 15:00	China	10–1 (2–0, 3–1, 5–0)	Italy	Moose Jaw Events Centre, Canada; Attendance: 570

Game reference

Yan Zhao Ji
Goalies
Gabriele Araudo
Santino Stillitano
Referee:
(Czech Republic) Martin Rapak
Linesmen:
(Slovakia) Igor Hus
(Sweden) Tony Rundstrom

Shen (Lyu) - 1:47	1–0
Zhang - 2:00	2–0
	2–1	Kafmann (Larch) - 19:00
Xu (Cui) (PP) - 22:47	3–1
Shen (Yu Tao Cui) - 24:44	4–1
Wang (Zhu) (PP) - 28:38	5–1
Li (Zhang) - 31:00	6–1
Shen (Lyu) - 31:59	7–1
Wang (Hu) 37:11	8–1
Shen (Tian) - 39:01	9–1
Shen (Tian) - 44:24	10–1

10 min
Penalties
10 min
29
Shots
9

28 May 2023; 19:00	Germany	5–3 (1–1, 2–0, 2–2)	Norway	Moose Jaw Events Centre, Canada; Attendance: 611

Game reference

Simon Kunst
Goalies
Andreas Sundt
Referee:
(Canada) Matt Fergenbaum
Linesmen:
(United States) Brendan Lewis
(Finland) Lari Niittyla

Hering - 1:41	1–0
	1–1	Bakke (Oiseth) - 11:02
Brelage (Hering, Rennhack) - 27:26	2–1
Schrader (Rennhack) (SH) - 29:42	3–1
Hering (Schrader) - 31:22	4–1
	4–2	Oiseth (Hamre) - 34:22
	4–3	Oiseth (Nordstoga) - 36:07
Ingo Khul-Lauenstein (Hering) (ENG) - 44:17	5–3

12 min
Penalties
4 min
17
Shots
22

29 May 2023; 15:00	China	5–1 (1–0, 1–0, 3–1)	Norway	Moose Jaw Events Centre, Canada; Attendance: 227

Game reference

Wei Wang
Goalies
Andreas Sundt
Referee:
(Canada) Patrick Myers
Linesmen:
(Slovakia) Igor Hus
(Finland) Lari Niittyla

Wang (Xu) - 0:58	1–0
Wong (Cui, Li) - 22:13	2–0
Shen (Zhang) (PP) - 32:17	3–0
Shen (Lyu) (SH) - 33:54	4–0
Zhang (Lyu, Shen) - 40:41	5–0
	5–1	Solberg (Oiseth, Bakke) - 44:12

6 min
Penalties
4 min
28
Shots
9

30 May 2023; 11:00	Italy	1–0 GWS (0–0, 0–0, 0–0) (OT 0–0) (SO: 1–0)	Germany	Moose Jaw Events Centre, Canada; Attendance: 529

Game reference
Santino Stillitano	Goalies	Simon Kunst	Referee: (Canada) Patrick Myers; Linesmen: (United States) Brendan Lewis (Canada) Ryan O'Rourke
Larch; Macri (miss); Depaoli	Shootout	Ingo Kuhl-Lauenstein (miss); Schrader (miss)	Referee: (Canada) Patrick Myers; Linesmen: (United States) Brendan Lewis (Canada) Ryan O'Rourke
4 min	Penalties	4 min	Referee: (Canada) Patrick Myers; Linesmen: (United States) Brendan Lewis (Canada) Ryan O'Rourke
11	Shots	26	Referee: (Canada) Patrick Myers; Linesmen: (United States) Brendan Lewis (Canada) Ryan O'Rourke

31 May 2023; 11:00	Germany	0–7 (0–3, 0–2, 0–2)	China	Moose Jaw Events Centre, Canada; Attendance: 927

Game reference

Simon Kunst
Goalies
Yan Zhao Ji
Referee:
(United States) Bobby Esposito
Linesmen:
(Canada) Dylan Dauphinee
(Canada) Ryan O'Rourke

0–1	Shen (Zhang) - 2:45
0–2	Che unassisted - 3:51
0–3	Shen (Wang) (PP) - 14:22
0–4	Shen unassisted - 24:51
0–5	Wang) unassisted - 28:53
0–6	Yi Feng Shen (Zhang) - 35:29
0–7	Wang (Qiu) - 37:13

6 min
Penalties
10 min
11
Shots
24

31 May 2023; 15:00	Norway	1–3 (0–1, 0–0, 1–2)	Italy	Moose Jaw Events Centre, Canada; Attendance: 213

Game reference

Andreas Sundt
Goalies
Santino Stillitano
Referee:
(Czech Republic) Martin Rapak
Linesmen:
(Norway) Marius Oswold-Hermansen
(Slovakia) Igor Hus

	0–1	Depaoli (Kafmann, Macri) - 10:15
	0–2	Stephan Kafmann (Larch) - 35:06
Bakke (Morten Vearnes) - 36:33	1–2
	1–3	Macri (Andreoni) - 39:19

4 min
Penalties
4 min
22
Shots
8

== Playoff round ==
=== Bracket ===
Quarterfinals
2 June
South Korea	2
China	7
2 June
Czechia	4
Italy	0

Semifinals
3 June
United States	10
China	2
3 June
Canada	5
Czechia	0

Final
4 June
United States	6
Canada	1
Third place
4 June
Czechia	3
China	2

=== Quarterfinals ===
2 June 2023; 15:00	Czechia	4–0 (0–0, 3–0, 1–0)	Italy	Moose Jaw Events Centre, Moose Jaw; Attendance: 298

Game reference

Martin Kudela
Goalies
Gabriele Araudo
Referee:
(Norway) Kenneth Danielsen
Linesmen:
(Slovakia) Igor Hus
(Finland) Lari Niittylä

Hábl (Ohar) – 25:06	1–0
Kubeš (Doležal) – 25:55	2–0
Geier (SH) – 26:47	3–0
Zelinka (Geier) – 38:38	4–0

4 min
Penalties
6 min
33
Shots
4

2 June 2021; 19:00	South Korea	2–7 (1–5, 0–0, 1–2)	China	Moose Jaw Events Centre, Moose Jaw; Attendance: 632

Game reference

Hyuk-Jun Choi
Goalies
Wei Wang
Referee:
(Canada) Matt Fergenbaum
Linesmen:
(Canada) Dylan Dauphinee
(Sweden) Andreas Lundén

	0–1	02:17 – Cui (Shen) (PP)
Jung (Jang) (PP) – 05:04	1–1
	1–2	07:28 – Shen (PP)
	1–3	08:01 – Wang (Zhu)
	1–4	11:40 – Li (Hu, Cui)
	1–5	14:50 – Tian (Shen)
Cho – 36:12	2–5
	2–6	41:05 – Li (Zhu)
	2–7	44:59 – Tian (Cui)

4 min
Penalties
6 min
9
Shots
23

=== Semifinals ===
3 June 2023; 15:00	United States	10–2 (4–1, 4–0, 2–1)	China	Moose Jaw Events Centre, Moose Jaw; Attendance: 689

Game reference

Jen Lee
Griffin LaMarre
Goalies
Ji Yanzhao
Referee:
(Canada) Patrick Myers
Linesmen:
(Norway) Marius Hermansen Oswold
(Sweden) Andreas Lundén

Musselman (Wallace) – 00:55	1–0
Jones (Farmer) – 02:25	2–0
Farmer Jones, Nichols) – 05:48	3–0
	3–1	09:49 – Li
Jones (Pauls, Grove) – 13:41	4–1
McKee (Eustace) – 18:02	5–1
Farmer (Wallace, Jones) – 19:07	6–1
Roybal (Nichols, Misiewicz) – 28:17	7–1
Roybal (Farmer, Douglas) – 29:19	8–1
Farmer (Jones, Grove) – 30:59	9–1
Roybal (Musselman, Misiewicz) – 31:23	10–1
	10–2	41:37 – Wang (Shen)

0 min
Penalties
2 min
23
Shots
7

3 June 2023; 19:00	Canada	5–0 (4–0, 0–0, 1–0)	Czechia	Moose Jaw Events Centre, Moose Jaw; Attendance: 1,458

Game reference

Dominic Larocque
Goalies
Martin Kudela
Referee:
(United States) Bobby Esposito
Linesmen:
(United States) Brendan Lewis
(Sweden) Tony Rundström

Cozzolino (Dixon) – 00:26	1–0
Dunn (McGregor, Dixon) (PP) – 06:00	2–0
Dunn (Halbert, Dixon) – 06:18	3–0
Lavin – 11:39	4–0
Cozzolino (McGregor) – 31:07	5–0

14 min
Penalties
20 min
24
Shots
11

=== Seventh place game ===
3 June 2023; 11:00	Germany	1–6 (0–2, 1–2, 0–2)	Norway	Moose Jaw Events Centre, Moose Jaw; Attendance: 203

Game reference

Simon Kunst
Goalies
Andreas Sundt
Referee:
(Czech Republic) Martin Rapák
Linesmen:
(Slovakia) Igor Hus
(Canada) Ryan O'Rourke

	0–1	03:52 – Øiseth (SH)
	0–2	10:25 – Bakke (Oiseth, Solberg)
	0–3	19:19 – Oiseth (Nordstoga, Lyngroth) (PP)
Sklorz (Disveld) – 23:35	1–3
	1–4	25:09 – Oiseth (Solberg)
	1–5	37:10 – Lyngroth (Hambre)
	1–6	38:26 – Solberg (Bakke)

4 min
Penalties
2 min
8
Shots
27

=== Fifth place game ===
4 June 2023; 11:00	South Korea	2–1 GWS (0–0, 1–1, 0–0) (OT: 1–0) (SO: 1–0)	Italy	Moose Jaw Events Centre, Moose Jaw; Attendance: 188

Game reference
Hyuk Jun Choi	Goalies	Santino Stillitano	Referee: (Canada) Patrick Myers; Linesmen: (Canada) Dylan Dauphinee (Finland) Lari Niittyla
/ 0–1 / Kafmann (Macri, Larch) (PP) - 25:54; Cho (Jung, Jang) (PP) - 28:53 / 1–1			Referee: (Canada) Patrick Myers; Linesmen: (Canada) Dylan Dauphinee (Finland) Lari Niittyla
Yang; Cho (miss); Kim (miss); Yang; Jung (miss); Yang	Shootout	Deapoli (miss); Macri; Larch (miss); Macri; Depaoli (miss); Macri (miss)	Referee: (Canada) Patrick Myers; Linesmen: (Canada) Dylan Dauphinee (Finland) Lari Niittyla
6 min	Penalties	4 min	Referee: (Canada) Patrick Myers; Linesmen: (Canada) Dylan Dauphinee (Finland) Lari Niittyla
24	Shots	20	Referee: (Canada) Patrick Myers; Linesmen: (Canada) Dylan Dauphinee (Finland) Lari Niittyla

=== Bronze medal game ===
4 June 2023; 15:00	Czechia	3–2 (1–1, 1–1, 1–0)	China	Moose Jaw Events Centre, Moose Jaw; Attendance: 689

Game reference

Martin Kudela
Goalies
Ji Yanzhao
Referee:
(United States) Bobby Esposito
Linesmen:
(Norway) Marius Oswold-Hermansen
(United States) Brendan Lweis

	0–1	Cui unassisted - 1:27
Geier (Kubes) - 11:17	1–1
Geier (Hecko) (PP) - 17:05	2–1
	2–2	Shen (Wang, Ji) - 29:48
Zelinka unassisted (PP) - 43:46	3–2

4 min
Penalties
6 min
10
Shots
15

=== Final ===
4 June 2023; 19:00	United States	6–1 (2–0, 2–0, 2–1)	Canada	Moose Jaw Events Centre, Moose Jaw; Attendance: 2838

Game reference

Jen Lee
Goalies
Dominic Larocque
Referee:
(Canada) Matt Fergenbaum
Linesmen:
(Sweden) Andreas Lunden
(Sweden) Tony Rundstrom

Misiewicz unassisted - 2:48	1–0
Farmer (Roybal) (SH) - 14:16	2–0
Eustace (Wallace) - 16:23	3–0
Wallace unassisted (SH) - 25:27	4–0
	4–1	McGregor (Lavin, Henry) - 34:22
Farmer (Grove, Jones) - 38:07	5–1
McKee (Eustace) ENG - 42:05	6–1

12 min
Penalties
6 min
23
Shots
9

== Scoring leaders ==
List shows the top skaters sorted by points, then goals.

Player	GP	G	A	Pts	+/−	PIM	POS
(China) Shen Yifeng	6	13	4	17	+14	0	F
(United States) Declan Farmer	5	9	3	12	+14	6	F
(China) Wang Zhidong	6	8	2	10	+9	4	F
(Canada) Dominic Cozzolino	5	6	4	10	+5	20	F
(United States) Malik Jones	5	4	6	10	+9	0	F
(Canada) Tyler McGregor	4	4	6	10	+6	2	F
(Canada) Adam Dixon	5	3	6	9	+3	4	F
(Norway) Ola Oiseth	4	5	3	8	+1	2	F
(United States) Jack Wallace	5	2	6	8	+19	2	D
(United States) Brody Roybal	4	5	2	7	+8	0	F

GP = Games played; G = Goals; A = Assists; Pts = Points; +/− = Plus/minus; PIM = Penalties in minutes; POS = Position

=== Leading goaltenders ===
Only the top five goaltenders, based on save percentage, who have played at least 40% of their team's minutes, are included in this list.

Player	TOI	GA	GAA	SA	Sv%	SO
(Italy) Santino Stillitano	170:16	8	2.11	85	90.59	1
(United States) Jen Lee	165:00	3	0.82	31	90.32	1
(Canada) Dominic Larocque	176:13	8	2.04	59	86.44	1
(Czech Republic) Martin Kudela	269:30	16	2.67	100	84.00	2
(South Korea) Hyuk Jun Choi	180:18	19	4.74	100	81.00	0

TOI = Time on Ice (minutes:seconds); SA = Shots against; GA = Goals against; GAA = Goals against average; Sv% = Save percentage; SO = Shutouts

== Final standings ==
Pos	Grp	Team	Pld	W	OTW	OTL	L	GF	GA	GD	Pts	Final result
1	A	United States	5	5	0	0	0	35	4	+31	15	Champions
2	A	Canada (H)	5	3	0	0	2	23	11	+12	9	Runners-up
3	A	Czech Republic	6	3	0	0	3	12	20	−8	9	Third place
4	B	China	6	4	0	0	2	33	17	+16	12	Fourth place
5	A	South Korea	5	0	1	0	4	5	35	−30	2	Fifth place game
6	B	Italy	5	1	1	1	2	6	13	−7	6	Fifth place game
7	B	Norway	4	1	0	0	3	11	14	−3	3	Relegated to Pool B
8	B	Germany	4	1	0	1	2	6	17	−11	4	Relegated to Pool B

Updated to match(es) played on completed. Source: https://stats.iihf.com/parahockey/13/IHX400000_Final_Ranking_4_0.pdf
(H) Host

== Pool B ==
2023 World Para Ice Hockey Championships Pool B
Tournament details
- Host country: Kazakhstan
- Venue(s): Terlan Arena, Astana
- Dates: 6–11 October
- Teams: 6

Final positions
- Champions: Japan (1st title)
- Runners-up: Slovakia
- Third place: Sweden
- Fourth place: Kazakhstan

Tournament statistics
- Games played: 15
- Goals scored: 113 (7.53 per game)

Official website
- Astana 2023

Pool B was hosted in Astana, Kazakhstan at the Terlan Arena. The schedule was released on the 27 September. The top two will get promoted to the A division for next year. Japan and Slovakia would end up being promoted to pool A for 2024, while Finland were relegated after losing all their games.

Each games was live streamed on the Paralympic Youtube channel.

=== Results ===
Pos	Team	Pld	W	OTW	OTL	L	GF	GA	GD	Pts	Qualification or relegation
1	Japan	5	4	1	0	0	32	3	+29	14	Advanced to Pool A
2	Slovakia	5	4	0	1	0	43	5	+38	13	Advanced to Pool A
3	Sweden	5	3	0	0	2	15	6	+9	9	
4	Kazakhstan (H)	5	2	0	0	3	11	23	−12	6	
5	Great Britain	5	1	0	0	4	9	41	−32	3	
6	Finland	5	0	0	0	5	2	34	−32	0	Relegated to Pool C

Source: IPC
(H) Host

All times are local.

6 October; 11:00	Finland	0–7 (0–5, 0–1, 0–1)	Sweden	Terlan Arena; Attendance: 124

Report

Karko
Goalies
Nilsson
Referee:
(United States) Bobby Esposito
Linesmen:
(Norway) Marius Oswold-Hermansen
(Canada) Ryan O'Rourke

0–1	6:41 – Moberg (Lopez, Meng)
0–2	7:03 – Moberg (Lopez, Sedell)
0–3	7:55 – Persson (Lopez, Nilsson)
0–4	8:48 – Ojala (Lopez)
0–5	14:25 – pp – Lopez (Liljebaek, Nilsson)
0–6	29:34 – Ojala (Meng, Lopez)
0–7	37:42 – pp – Liljebaek (Nilsson)

4 min
Penalties
4 min
2
Shots
19

6 October; 15:00	Great Britain	0–13 (0–2, 0–9, 0–2)	Japan	Terlan Arena; Attendance: 84

Report

Hackworth
Rogers-Hartley
Goalies
Horie
Referee:
(Bosnia and Herzegovina) Ivan Nedelkovic
Linesmen:
(Slovakia) Igor Hus
(Finland) Tom Lonnqvist

0–1	1:17 – Kumagai (Misawa)
0–2	4:19 – pp – Kumagai (Uehara)
0–3	15:36 – Kumagai (Misawa)
0–4	17:06 – Kumagai (Misawa)
0–5	19:44 – Niitsu (Sudo)
0–6	21:16 – Nasu (Uehara, Nakamura)
0–7	22:05 – Kumagai (Sudo)
0–8	24:04 – Nasu (Ishikawa, Nakamura)
0–9	27:06 – Misawa
0–10	28:33 – sh – Sudo (Uehara)
0–11	29:10 – Kumagai (Niitsu)
0–12	35:34 – pp – Kumagai (Ito)
0–13	43:51 – Ito (Kumagai)

8 min
Penalties
10 min
2
Shots
44

6 October; 19:00	Kazakhstan	1–10 (0–3, 0–2, 1–5)	Slovakia	Terlan Arena; Attendance: 234

Report

Basmanov
Goalies
Pastucha
Referee:
(Canada) Kevin Webinger
Linesmen:
(Finland) Lari Niittyla
(Sweden) Tony Rundstrom

	0–1	6:50 – Joppa
	0–2	13:51 – pp – Hlinka (Joppa)
	0–3	14:16 – Stasak (Joppa, Korman)
	0–4	21:55 – pp – Vecerek (Ligda)
	0–5	26:03 – Stasak (Joppa, Korman)
	0–6	33:42 – Korman (Ferencik)
	0–7	36:39 – pp – Joppa (Hlinka)
	0–8	37:02 – pp – Stasak (Ferencik)
Toktarbayev – 37:12	1–8
	1–9	41:24 – pp – Stsak
	1–10	44:29 – sh – Ferencik (Korman)

37 min
Penalties
8 min
1
Shots
21

7 October; 11:00	Sweden	5–1 (4–0, 1–1, 0–0)	Great Britain	Terlan Arena; Attendance: 78

Report

Nilsson
Goalies
Hackworth
Referee:
(Bosnia and Herzegovina) Ivan Nedelkovic
Linesmen:
(Finland) Tom Lonnqvist
(Canada) Ryan O'Rourke

Nilsson (Lopez) – 00:17	1–0
Nilsson (Meng) – sh – 4:11	2–0
Meng (Lopez) – 5:53	3–0
Meng (Strandmark) – 13:55	4–0
	4–1	20:00 – Stephens (Christopher)
Lopez (Moberg) – 26:06	5–1

10 min
Penalties
2 min
22
Shots
9

7 October; 15:00	Slovakia	9–0 (4–0, 3–0, 2–0)	Finland	Terlan Arena; Attendance: 62

Report

Lepacek
Goalies
Heikkila
Karko
Referee:
(Italy) Simone Lega
Linesmen:
(Norway) Marius Oswold-Hermansen
(Sweden) Tony Rundstrom

Turic (Kascak, Varga) – pp – 4:00	1–0
Joppa (Hlinka, Stasak) – pp – 11:55	2–0
Korman (Joppa, Hlinka) – 13:28	3–0
Vecerek (Kascak, Varga – 14:54	4–0
Stasak (Joppa, Hlinka) – 21:04	5–0
Joppa (Ferencik, Korman) – 21:20	6–0
Stasak (Joppa, Korman) – 28:15	7–0
Joppa (Stasak, Korman) – pp – 38:23	8–0
Joppa (Stasak, Ligda) – 43:45	9–0

2 min
Penalties
8 min
38
Shots
4

7 October; 19:00	Japan	6–0 (3–0, 2–0, 1–0)	Kazakhstan	Terlan Arena; Attendance: 202

Report

Horie
Goalies
Mukatov
Referee:
(United States) Bobby Esposito
Linesmen:
(Slovakia) Igor Hus
(Finland) Lari Niittyla

Ito (Kumagai) – pp – 4:32	1–0
Uehara (Nakamura) – 8:42	2–0
Kumagai (Misawa) – 12:10	3–0
Ito (Kumagai) – 20:21	4–0
Uehara (Ito) – 23:53	5–0
Ishikawa (Ito) – 42:50	6–0

6 min
Penalties
10 min
21
Shots
5

8 October; 11:00	Slovakia	18–1 (5–1, 7–0, 6–0)	Great Britain	Terlan Arena; Attendance: 58

Report

Pastucha
Goalies
Hackworth
Referee:
(United States) Bobby Esposito
Linesmen:
(Canada) Ryan O'Rourke
(Sweden) Tony Rundstrom

Stasak (Joppa) – 00:47	1–0
Joppa (Stasak) – 3:03	2–0
	2–1	11:32 – Stephens
Ligda (Vecerek) – 11:50	3–1
Joppa (Stasak) – 13:10	4–1
Stasak (Joppa) – 13:43	5–1
Joppa – 18:05	6–1
Ligda (Kascak) – 19:14	7–1
Stasak (Korman) – 20:41	8–1
Korman (Ferencik) – 22:14	9–1
Korman – 23:49	10–1
Joppa (Ferencik) – 25:28	11–1
Korman (Joppa) – 26:32	12–1
Korman (Stasak) – pp – 30:50	13–1
Joppa (Stasak, Korman) – 32:19	14–1
Ferencik (Korman, Joppa) – 37:58	15–1
Stasak (Joppa) – 40:50	16–1
Ferencik (Korman) – 41:11	17–1
Hlinka (Stasak) – 44:49	18–1

0 min
Penalties
16 min
30
Shots
6

8 October; 15:00	Sweden	0–1 (0–0, 0–1, 0–0)	Japan	Terlan Arena; Attendance: 62

Report
Nilsson	Goalies	Horie	Referee: (Canada) Kevin Webinger; Linesmen: (Finland) Tom Lonnqvist (Finland) Lari Niittyla
0–1 / 15:45 – Kumagai (Niitsu)			Referee: (Canada) Kevin Webinger; Linesmen: (Finland) Tom Lonnqvist (Finland) Lari Niittyla
2 min	Penalties	4 min	Referee: (Canada) Kevin Webinger; Linesmen: (Finland) Tom Lonnqvist (Finland) Lari Niittyla
4	Shots	11	Referee: (Canada) Kevin Webinger; Linesmen: (Finland) Tom Lonnqvist (Finland) Lari Niittyla

8 October; 19:00	Kazakhstan	6–1 (1–0, 3–1, 2–0)	Finland	Terlan Arena; Attendance: 202

Report

Basmanov
Goalies
Heikkila
Karko
Referee:
(Italy) Simone Lega
Linesmen:
(Norway) Marius Oswold-Hermansen
(Slovakia) Igor Hus

Ahkmetov (Karipbayev, Paskhalidi) – 1:47	1–0
Bexultan (Toktarbayev, Karipbayev) – 21:10	2–0
Miyanov (Akhmetov, Bondarenko) – 22:10	3–0
Bexultan (Karipbayev, Toktarbayev) – 22:46	4–0
	4–1	25:07 – Alestalo (Kangastie, Niskanen)
Akhmetov (Paskhalidi) – pp – 37:18	5–1
Karipbayev (Bexultan, Toktarbayev) – 44:09	6–1

10 min
Penalties
4 min
18
Shots
7

10 October; 11:00	Japan	4–3 GWS (2–2, 0–0, 0–0) (OT: 0–0) (SO: 2–1)	Slovakia	Terlan Arena; Attendance: 82

Report

Horie
Goalies
Lepacek
Referee:
(Italy) Simone Lega
Linesmen:
(Norway) Marius Oswold-Hermansen
(Canada) Ryan O'Rourke

	0–1	6:23 – Ferencik (Korman, Stasak)
Ito (Misawa, Kumagai) – 7:13	1–1
Ito (Niitsu) – sh – 8:55	2–1
	2–2	11:13 – Joppa (Ligda, Kascak)

Ito (miss)
Kumagai
Uehara (miss)
Ito
Shootout
(miss) Stasak
(miss) Vecerek
Joppa
(miss) Joppa
2 min
Penalties
6 min
10
Shots
16

10 October; 15:00	Finland	1–4 (1–0, 0–3, 0–1)	Great Britain	Terlan Arena; Attendance: 62

Report

Karko
Goalies
Hackworth
Referee:
(Canada) Kevin Webinger
Linesmen:
(Canada) Dylan Dauphinee
(Finland) Tom Lonnqvist

Lehto (Hirvela) – 11:24	1–0
	1–1	16:02 – Stephens (Christopher)
	1–2	17:43 – Farmer (Stephens, le Galloudec)
	1–3	28:44 – Christopher (Stephens, Brown)
	1–4	43:44 – en – Christopher

2 min
Penalties
8 min
10
Shots
12

10 October; 19:00	Sweden	3–0 (0–0, 0–0, 3–0)	Kazakhstan	Terlan Arena; Attendance: 94

Report

Nilsson
Goalies
Basmanov
Referee:
(Bosnia and Herzegovina) Ivan Nedelkovic
Linesmen:
(Slovakia) Igor Hus
(Sweden) Tony Rundstrom

Nilsson (Liljebaek) – 35:59	1–0
Nilsson – 43:54	2–0
Lopez (Persson) – 44:35	3–0

2 min
Penalties
8 min
14
Shots
4

11 October; 11:00	Japan	8–0 (4–0, 2–0, 2–0)	Finland	Terlan Arena; Attendance: 58

Report

Horie
Okabe
Goalies
Karko
Heikkila
Referee:
(Bosnia and Herzegovina) Ivan Nedelkovic
Linesmen:
(Slovakia) Igor Hus
(Finland) Lari Niittyla

Niitsu (Kumagai, Misawa) – 00:27	1–0
Shioya (Misawa, Kumagai) – 4:31	2–0
Sudo – 11:01	3–0
Uehara (Niitsu) – 13:50	4–0
Kumagai (Niitsu) – 15:48	5–0
Ito (Niitsu) – 20:19	6–0
Kumagai (Uehara) – pp – 35:40	7–0
Sudo – 42:35	8–0

0 min
Penalties
4 min
26
Shots
1

11 October; 15:00	Slovakia	4–0 (1–0, 1–0, 2–0)	Sweden	Terlan Arena; Attendance: 78

Report

Lepacek
Goalies
Nilsson
Referee:
(United States) Bobby Esposito
Linesmen:
(Canada) Ryan O'Rourke
(Sweden) Tony Rundstrom

Hlinka (Korman, Vecerek) – 00:26	1–0
Stasak (Ferencik) – 21:24	2–0
Ferencik (Stasak) – pp – 42:12	3–0
Korman (Joppa) – 43:49	4–0

4 min
Penalties
4 min
17
Shots
2

11 October; 19:00	Great Britain	3–4 (0–0, 2–2, 1–2)	Kazakhstan	Terlan Arena; Attendance: 232

Report

Hackworth
Goalies
Mukatov
Referee:
(Italy) Simone Lega
Linesmen:
(Canada) Dylan Dauphinee
(Norway) Marius Oswold-Hermansen

	0–1	16:23 – Bondarenko (Miyanov, Sabirov)
Watts (Christopher, Farmer) – 18:09	1–1
	1–2	27:35 – Karipbayev
Stephens (Christopher, Quirk) – 29:16	2–2
	2–3	36:17 – Toktarbayev (Bondarenko, Miyanov)
	2–4	37:08 – Paskhalidi (Toktarbayev, Karipbayev)
Christopher (Farmer) – pp – 43:20	3–4

4 min
Penalties
8 min
8
Shots
25

== Pool C ==
2022 World Para Ice Hockey Championships Pool C
Tournament details
- Host country: Thailand
- Venue(s): Thailand International Ice Hockey Arena, Bangkok
- Dates: 6–11 December
- Teams: 5

Final positions
- Champions: Great Britain (1st title)
- Runners-up: Kazakhstan
- Third place: France

Tournament statistics
- Games played: 10
- Goals scored: 70 (7 per game)

Official website
- Bangkok 2022

Pool C was held for the first time since 2018. The tournament was held for the first time in Asia, being organise in Bangkok, Thailand at the Thailand International Ice Hockey Arena. The top two were promoted to the 2023 Pool B. Great Britain won the competition, winning every game. Six teams were going to participate, before Armenia withdrew just before the tournament started. Had the Armenians entered, they would've made their Para Ice Hockey debut. This event saw the Para Ice Hockey debut of France, Kazakhstan and Thailand.

Each game was live streamed on the Paralympic Youtube channel.

=== Results ===
Pos	Team	Pld	W	OTW	OTL	L	GF	GA	GD	Pts	Qualification or relegation
1	Great Britain	4	4	0	0	0	31	0	+31	12	Advanced to Pool B
2	Kazakhstan	4	3	0	0	1	26	8	+18	9	Advanced to Pool B
3	France	4	2	0	0	2	5	18	−13	6	Promoted to Pool B in 2024 (Note: Starting in 2024, Pool C will no longer be a feeder competition for the same season's Pool B and thus France took the vacant spot in Pool B for 2024.)
4	Austria	4	1	0	0	3	8	19	−11	3	
5	Thailand (H)	4	0	0	0	4	0	25	−25	0	
6	Armenia	0	0	0	0	0	0	0	0	0	Withdrew

Source: IPC
(H) Host

All times are local.

6 December; 14:30	Austria	1–3 (0–1, 1–0, 0–2)	France	Thailand International Ice Hockey Arena; Attendance: 89

Report

Ossimitz
Goalies
Blavette
Referee:
(Italy) Simone Soraperra
Linesmen:
(Finland) Lari Niittyla
(Hungary) Zoltan Sos

	0–1	5:22 – Braysse (Cadonna, Bataille)
Habeler (Reininger) – pp – 27:31	1–1
	1–2	51:07 – pp – Cadonna (Bataille)
	1–3	59:54 – en – Braysse (Cadonna)

14 min
Penalties
12 min
9
Shots
7

6 December; 19:00	Great Britain	11–0 (3–0, 4–0, 4–0)	Thailand	Thailand International Ice Hockey Arena

Report

Hackworth
Hill
Goalies
Phanoot
Referee:
(Canada) Patrick Myers
Linesmen:
(Serbia) Tibor Fazekas
(United States) Jeremy Hutchins

Stephens – 8:12	1–0
Farmer (Christopher) – 11:43	2–0
Farmer (Hutchcraft, Stephens) – 19:32	3–0
Nicholson (Campbell, Christopher) – 33:11	4–0
Czernuszka-Watts (Farmer) – 35:14	5–0
Farmer (Hutchcraft) – 35:59	6–0
Stephens (Mead) – 36:49	7–0
Farmer (Nicholson) – pp – 46:14	8–0
Nicholson (Campbell) – 48:36	9–0
le Galloudec (Christopher) – sh – 51:23	10–0
Nicholson (Farmer, le Galloudec) – 53:23	11–0

2 min
Penalties
12 min
32
Shots
2

7 December; 14:30	France	0–7 (0–1, 0–3, 0–3)	Great Britain	Thailand International Ice Hockey Arena

Report

Blavette
Goalies
Hackworth
Hill
Referee:
(United States) Logan Wetekamp
Linesmen:
(Norway) Marius Oswold-Hermansen
(Slovakia) Igor Hus

0–1	9:59 – Christopher (Nicholson)
0–2	27:01 – Stephens
0–3	28:01 – Christopher (Nicholson)
0–4	36:40 – Christopher (Farmer)
0–5	48:46 – Stephens
0–6	50:16 – Christopher (Stephens)
0–7	58:51 – sh – Nicholson

4 min
Penalties
31 min
0
Shots
34

7 December; 18:00	Thailand	0–7 (0–3, 0–2, 0–2)	Kazakhstan	Thailand International Ice Hockey Arena

Report

Phanoot
Goalies
Mukatov
Basmanov
Referee:
(Canada) Kevin Webinger
Linesman:
(Finland) Lari Niittyla

0–1	6:44 – Karipbayev (Sabirov)
0–2	13:02 – Paskhalidi
0–3	19:56 – Bexultan
0–4	30:02 – Karipbayev (Abdygalimov)
0–5	34:26 – pp – Bexultan (Miyanov)
0–6	52:37 – Bexultan (Miyanov)
0–7	55:49 – Karipbayev (Paskhalidi)

8 min
Penalties
6 min
2
Shots
27

8 December; 14:30	Kazakhstan	10–0 (2–0, 4–0, 4–0)	France	Thailand International Ice Hockey Arena

Report

Mukatov
Basmanov
Goalies
Blavette
Aknin
Referee:
(Canada) Kevin Webinger
Linesmen:
(United States) Jeremy Hutchins
(Slovakia) Igor Hus

Karipbayev (Bondarenko) – 10:51	1–0
Bondarenko – 16:05	2–0
Bexultan (Karipbayev) – 28:34	3–0
Bexultan – 31:21	4–0
Karipbayev – 31:58	5–0
Bexultan (Paskhalidi) – sh – 35:30	6–0
Miyanov (Bexultan) – 47:20	7–0
Toktarbayev (Akhmetov) – 50:13	8–0
Abdygalimov (Sabirov) – 56:13	9–0
Miyanov (Akhmetov, Toktarbayev) – 58:47	10–0

6 min
Penalties
2 min
27
Shots
0

8 December; 18:00	Great Britain	7–0 (3–0, 2–0, 2–0)	Austria	Thailand International Ice Hockey Arena; Attendance: 55

Report

Hill
Goalies
Ossimitz
Ladstaetter
Referee:
(Italy) Simone Soraperra
Linesmen:
(Norway) Marius Oswold-Hermansen
(Sweden) Tony Rundstrom

Stephens (Nicholson, Quirk) – 11:42	1–0
Farmer – 14:54	2–0
Nicholson (Stephens) – 15:49	3–0
Christopher (Stephens) – 28:32	4–0
Christopher (Nicholson) – 39:32	5–0
Christopher (Farmer, Stephens) – 56:18	6–0
Farmer (le Galloudec) – 58:03	7–0

2 min
Penalties
14 min
31
Shots
2

10 December; 14:30	Austria	2–9 (1–2, 0–2, 1–5)	Kazakhstan	Thailand International Ice Hockey Arena; Attendance: 75

Report

Ossimitz
Goalies
Mukatov
Basmanov
Referee:
(United States) Logan Wetekamp
Linesmen:
(Slovakia) Igor Hus
(United States) Jeremy Hutchins

	0–1	11:28 – Akhmetov (Toktarbayev)
	0–2	15:27 – sh – Toktarbayev
Habeler (Ropp) – pp – 16:16	1–2
	1–3	28:37 – sh – Paskhalidi (Karipbayev)
	1–4	28:58 – Toktarbayev (Bexultan)
	1–5	51:08 – pp – Miyanov (Bexultan)
	1–6	57:43 – pp – Karipbayev (Bexultan)
Sauer – 58:07	2–6
	2–7	58:41 – Karipbayev (Bexultan)
	2–8	59:44 – Toktarbayev
	2–9	59:54 – Karipbayev

14 min
Penalties
10 min
8
Shots
31

10 December; 18:00	France	2–0 (1–0, 0–0, 1–0)	Thailand	Thailand International Ice Hockey Arena; Attendance: 300

Report
Blavette	Goalies	Phanoot	Referee: (Canada) Patrick Myers; Linesmen: (Serbia) Tibor Fazekas (Sweden) Tony Rundstrom
Linier (Jouenne) – 11:05 / 1–0; Six (Linier, Braysse) – 46:40 / 2–0			Referee: (Canada) Patrick Myers; Linesmen: (Serbia) Tibor Fazekas (Sweden) Tony Rundstrom
8 min	Penalties	6 min	Referee: (Canada) Patrick Myers; Linesmen: (Serbia) Tibor Fazekas (Sweden) Tony Rundstrom
13	Shots	3	Referee: (Canada) Patrick Myers; Linesmen: (Serbia) Tibor Fazekas (Sweden) Tony Rundstrom

11 December; 14:30	Kazakhstan	0–6 (0–3, 0–1, 0–2)	Great Britain	Thailand International Ice Hockey Arena; Attendance: 89

Report

Mukatov
Basmanov
Goalies
Hackworth
Referee:
(Canada) Patrick Myers
Linesmen:
(Norway) Marius Oswold-Hermansen
(Sweden) Tony Rundstrom

0–1	8:32 – pp – Christopher (Farmer, Nicholson)
0–2	9:22 – Farmer (Stephens, Christopher)
0–3	19:51 – Farmer
0–4	27:24 – pp – Farmer (le Galloudec, Christopher)
0–5	49:16 – Farmer
0–6	58:47 – sh – Farmer

10 min
Penalties
4 min
3
Shots
30

11 December; 18:00	Thailand	0–5 (0–3, 0–2, 0–0)	Austria	Thailand International Ice Hockey Arena

Report

Phanoot
Goalies
Ossimitz
Ladstaetter
Referee:
(Italy) Simone Soraperra
Linesmen:
(Serbia) Tibor Fazekas
(Slovakia) Igor Hus

0–1	11:55 – Habeler (Wliszczak)
0–2	13:18 – Habeler (Sauer, Wliszczak)
0–3	19:33 – Ropp (Habeler)
0–4	29:28 – Ropp
0–5	34:07 – Ropp (Habeler)

8 min
Penalties
8 min
8
Shots
16

== Sources ==
- Pool A
- Pool B
- Pool C
