= United States men's national ice sledge hockey team =

United States
- Nickname: Team USA
- Association: USA Hockey
- Team colors
- IIHF code: USA
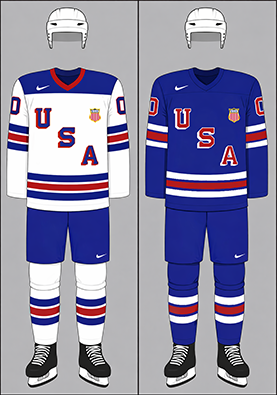

Paralympics
- Appearances: 7 (first in 1998)
- Medals: Gold: (2002, 2010, 2014, 2018, 2022, 2026); Bronze: (2006)

World Para Ice Hockey Championships
- Appearances: 14 (first in 1996)
- Best result: Gold: (2009, 2012, 2015, 2019, 2021, 2023, 2025)

Medal record

Paralympic Games
Gold medal – first place	2002 Salt Lake City	Team
Gold medal – first place	2010 Vancouver	Team
Gold medal – first place	2014 Sochi	Team
Gold medal – first place	2018 Pyeongchang	Team
Gold medal – first place	2022 Beijing	Team
Gold medal – first place	2026 Milano Cortina	Team
Bronze medal – third place	2006 Turin	Team

World Championship
Gold medal – first place	2009 Netherlands	
Gold medal – first place	2012 Norway	
Gold medal – first place	2015 United States	
Gold medal – first place	2019 Czech Republic	
Gold medal – first place	2021 Czech Republic	
Gold medal – first place	2023 Canada	
Gold medal – first place	2025 United States	
Silver medal – second place	2004 Sweden	
Silver medal – second place	2013 South Korea	
Silver medal – second place	2017 South Korea	
Silver medal – second place	2024 Canada	
Bronze medal – third place	2008 United States	

The United States men's national ice sledge hockey team represents the United States at the World Para Ice Hockey Championships and Paralympic Games. The team is overseen by USA Hockey. The team is one of the most successful in international para ice hockey, having won a record five Paralympic gold medals and a record seven World Championship titles.
