= Ice hockey at the Winter Paralympics =

- Governing body: IPC
- Events: 1 (mixed)

Games
- 1976; 1980; 1984; 1988; 1992; 1994; 1998; 2002; 2006; 2010; 2014; 2018; 2022; 2026
- Medalists

Para ice hockey at the Winter Paralympics has been held since the 1994 Winter Paralympics, when it was known as ice sledge hockey (the sport was renamed by the International Paralympic Committee in 2016).

The tournament was to change from a men's to a mixed tournament for the 2010 Paralympic Games in Vancouver, allowing the teams to include female players, but no women participated in the 2010 tournament.. Women were also eligible in the 1994 Winter Paralympics in Lillehammer as Britt Mjaasund Øyen was a part of the Silver winning Norwegian team.

== Medalists ==
Open

Games	Gold	Silver	Bronze
1994 Lillehammer	Sweden	Norway	Canada
1998 Nagano	Norway	Canada	Sweden
2002 Salt Lake City	United States	Norway	Sweden
2006 Turin	Canada	Norway	United States
2010 Vancouver	United States	Japan	Norway
2014 Sochi	United States	Russia	Canada
2018 Pyeongchang	United States	Canada	South Korea
2022 Beijing	United States	Canada	China
2026 Milano Cortina	United States	Canada	China

== Tournaments ==
Year	Host	Gold medal game			Bronze medal game
Year	Host	Gold medalist	Score	Silver medalist	Bronze medalist	Score	Fourth place
1994 details	Lillehammer	Sweden	1–0; OT	Norway	Canada	2–0	Great Britain
1998 details	Nagano	Norway	2–0	Canada	Sweden	10–1	Estonia
2002 details	Salt Lake City	United States	4–3; GWS	Norway	Sweden	2–1; GWS	Canada
2006 details	Turin	Canada	3–0	Norway	United States	4–3	Germany
2010 details	Vancouver	United States	2–0	Japan	Norway	2–1	Canada
2014 details	Sochi	United States	1–0	Russia	Canada	3–0	Norway
2018 details	Pyeongchang	United States	2–1; OT	Canada	South Korea	1–0	Italy
2022 details	Beijing	United States	5–0	Canada	China	4–0	South Korea
2026 details	Milan	United States	6–2	Canada	China	3–2	Czech Republic

=== Medal table ===
As of 2026 Winter Paralympics

Rank	Nation	Gold	Silver	Bronze	Total
1	United States	6	0	1	7
2	Canada	1	4	2	7
3	Norway	1	3	1	5
4	Sweden	1	0	2	3
5	Japan	0	1	0	1
5	Russia	0	1	0	1
7	China	0	0	2	2
8	South Korea	0	0	1	1
Totals (8 entries)		9	9	9	27

=== Participating nations ===
Team	(Norway); 1994	(Japan); 1998	(United States); 2002	(Italy); 2006	(Canada); 2010	(Russia); 2014	(South Korea); 2018	(China); 2022	(Italy); 2026
Canada (CAN)	3	2	4	1	4	3	2	2	2
China (CHN)	–	–	–	–	–	–	–	3	3
Czech Republic (CZE)	–	–	–	–	5	5	6	6	4
Estonia (EST)	5	4	6	–	–	–	–	–	–
Germany (GER)	–	–	–	4	–	–	–	–	6
Great Britain (GBR)	4	7	–	7	–	–	–	–	–
Italy (ITA)	–	–	–	8	7	6	4	5	5
Japan (JPN)	–	5	5	5	2	–	8	–	8
Norway (NOR)	2	1	2	2	3	4	5	-	–
Russia (RUS)	–	–	–	–	–	2	–	–	–
RPC (RPC) (Note: Russia and Belarus were banned from competing in the Paralympics after the countries' invasion of Ukraine.)	–	–	–	–	–	–	–	DQ	–
Slovakia (SVK)	–	–	–	–	–	–	–	7	7
South Korea (KOR)	–	–	–	–	6	7	3	4	–
Sweden (SWE)	1	3	3	6	8	8	7	–	–
United States (USA)	–	6	1	3	1	1	1	1	1
Total teams	5	7	6	8	8	8	8	7	8

== Complete Results ==
1. https://www.paralympic.org/lillehammer-1994/results/para-ice-hockey
2. https://www.paralympic.org/nagano-1998/results/para-ice-hockey
3. https://www.paralympic.org/salt-lake-city-2002/results/para-ice-hockey
4. https://www.paralympic.org/torino-2006/results/para-ice-hockey
5. https://www.paralympic.org/vancouver-2010/results/para-ice-hockey
6. https://www.paralympic.org/sochi-2014/results/para-ice-hockey
7. https://www.paralympic.org/pyeongchang-2018/results/para-ice-hockey
8. https://www.paralympic.org/beijing-2022/results/para-ice-hockey

== See also ==
- Ice hockey at the Olympic Games
- Para Ice hockey
