= World Para Ice Hockey Championships =

International para ice hockey tournament

- Sport: Para ice hockey
- Founded: 1996
- Country: IPC members
- Continent: IPC (International)
- Most recent champion: United States (7th title)
- Most titles: United States (7 titles)

The World Para Ice Hockey Championships, known before 30 November 2016 as the IPC Ice Sledge Hockey World Championships, are the world championships for Para ice hockey. They are organised by the International Paralympic Committee through its World Para Ice Hockey subcommittee.

The first sanctioned World Para Ice Hockey Championships were held in Nynäshamn, Sweden in 1996.

On 30 November 2016, the IPC, which serves as the international governing body for 10 disability sports, adopted the "World Para" branding across all of those sports. At the same time, it changed the official name of the sport from "sledge hockey" to "Para ice hockey". The name of the world championships was immediately changed to "World Para Ice Hockey Championships" (WPIHC).

== Pool A ==
=== Results ===
Year	Host	Gold medal game			Bronze medal game		
Year	Host	Gold	Score	Silver	Bronze	Score	Fourth place
1996	(Sweden); Nynäshamn	Sweden	3–2	Norway	Canada	3–1	Estonia
2000	(United States); West Valley City	Canada	2–1	Norway	Sweden	5–1	Japan
2004	(Sweden); Örnsköldsvik	Norway	2–1	United States	Sweden	3–0	Canada
2008	(United States); Marlborough	Canada	3–2	Norway	United States	3–1	Japan
2009	(Czech Republic); Ostrava	United States	1–0	Norway	Canada	2–0	Japan
2012	(Norway); Hamar	United States	5–1	South Korea	Canada	2–0	Czech Republic
2013	(South Korea); Goyang	Canada	1–0	United States	Russia	3–0	Czech Republic
2015	(United States); Buffalo	United States	3–0	Canada	Russia	2–1; OT	Norway
2017	(South Korea); Gangneung	Canada	4–1	United States	South Korea	3–1	Norway
2019	(Czech Republic); Ostrava	United States	3–2; OT	Canada	South Korea	4–1	Czech Republic
2021	(Czech Republic); Ostrava	United States	5–1	Canada	RPC	7–0	South Korea
2023	(Canada); Moose Jaw	United States	6–1	Canada	Czechia	3–2	China
2024	(Canada); Calgary	Canada	2–1	United States	Czechia	3–2	China
2025	(United States); Buffalo	United States	6–1	Canada	Czechia	2–1; OT	China
2027	(Czech Republic); Ostrava						

=== Medal table ===
Rank	Nation	Gold	Silver	Bronze	Total
1	United States (USA)	7	4	1	12
2	Canada (CAN)	5	5	3	13
3	Norway (NOR)	1	4	0	5
4	Sweden (SWE)	1	0	2	3
5	South Korea (KOR)	0	1	2	3
6	Czech Republic (CZE)	0	0	3	3
6	Russia (RUS)	0	0	3	3
Totals (7 entries)		14	14	14	42

=== Participating nations ===
Team	(Sweden); 1996	(United States); 2000	(Sweden); 2004	(United States); 2008	(Czech Republic); 2009	(Norway); 2012	(South Korea); 2013	(United States); 2015	(South Korea); 2017	(Czech Republic); 2019	(Czech Republic); 2021	(Canada); 2023	(Canada); 2024	(United States); 2025	Total
Canada	3rd	1st	4th	1st	3rd	3rd	1st	2nd	1st	2nd	2nd	2nd	1st	2nd	14
China	–	–	–	–	–	–	–	–	–	–	–	4th	4th	4th	3
Czechia	–	–	–	–	5th	4th	4th	7th	–	4th	5th	3rd	3rd	3rd	9
Estonia	4th	5th	8th	–	–	8th	–	–	–	–	–	–	–	–	4
Germany	–	–	7th	5th	8th	–	–	6th	7th	–	–	8th	–	5th	7
Great Britain	–	–	5th	–	–	–	–	–	–	–	–	–	–	–	1
Italy	–	–	–	6th	6th	6th	6th	5th	5th	6th	7th	6th	7th	–	10
Japan	6th	4th	6th	4th	4th	7th	–	8th	–	8th	–	–	8th	–	9
Norway	2nd	2nd	1st	2nd	2nd	5th	5th	4th	4th	5th	6th	7th	–	8th	13
Russia	–	–	–	–	–	–	3rd	3rd	–	–	3rd	–	–	–	3
Slovakia	–	–	–	–	–	–	–	–	–	–	8th	–	6th	6th	3
South Korea	–	–	–	–	7th	2nd	7th	–	3rd	3rd	4th	5th	5th	7th	9
Sweden	1st	3rd	3rd	–	–	–	8th	–	6th	7th	–	–	–	–	6
United States	5th	6th	2nd	3rd	1st	1st	2nd	1st	2nd	1st	1st	1st	2nd	1st	14

== Pool B ==
Year	Host	Gold medal game			Bronze medal game		
Year	Host	Gold	Score	Silver	Bronze	Score	Fourth place
2008	(United States); Marlborough	South Korea	2–0	Czech Republic	Estonia	8–2	Poland
2009	(Netherlands); Eindhoven	Estonia	1–0	Sweden	Poland	5–1	Great Britain
2012	(Serbia); Novi Sad	Russia	1–0	Sweden	Germany	8–1	Poland
2013	(Japan); Nagano	Germany	3–2	Japan	Great Britain	3–2	Estonia
2015	(Sweden); Östersund	South Korea	Robin round	Sweden	Slovakia	Robin round	Poland
2016	(Japan); Tomakomai	Czech Republic	6–0	Japan	Slovakia	5–1	Great Britain
2019	(Germany); Berlin	Russia	Robin round	Slovakia	China	Robin round	Germany
2021	(Sweden); Östersund	China	Robin round	Germany	Sweden	Robin round	Japan
2023	(Kazakhstan); Astana	Japan	Robin round	Slovakia	Sweden	Robin round	Kazakhstan
2024	(Norway); Skien	Norway	Robin round	Germany	Sweden	Robin round	Kazakhstan
2025	(Kazakhstan); Astana	Italy	Robin round	Japan	Sweden	Robin round	Kazakhstan

=== Participating nations ===
Team	(United States); 2008	(Netherlands); 2009	(Serbia); 2012	(Japan); 2013	(Sweden); 2015	(Japan); 2017	(Germany); 2019	(Sweden); 2021	(Kazakhstan); 2023	(Norway); 2024	(Kazakhstan); 2025	Total
Austria	–	–	6th	–	6th	–	–	–	–	–	–	2
China	–	–	–	–	–	–	3rd	1st	–	–	–	2
Czech Republic	2nd	–	–	–	–	1st	–	–	–	–	–	2
Estonia	3rd	1st	–	4th	–	–	–	–	–	–	–	3
Finland	–	–	–	–	–	–	–	5th	6th	–	5th	3
France	–	–	–	–	–	–	–	–	–	5th	6th	2
Germany	–	–	3rd	1st	–	–	4th	2nd	–	2nd	–	5
Great Britain	–	4th	–	3rd	5th	4th	6th	–	5th	6th	–	7
Italy	–	–	–	–	–	–	–	–	–	–	1st	1
Japan	–	–	–	2nd	–	2nd	–	4th	1st	–	2nd	5
Kazakhstan	–	–	–	–	–	–	–	–	4th	4th	4th	3
Netherlands	–	5th	5th	–	–	–	–	–	–	–	–	2
Norway	–	–	–	–	–	–	–	–	–	1st	–	1
Poland	4th	3rd	4th	6th	4th	–	5th	6th	–	–	–	7
Russia	–	–	1st	–	–	–	1st	–	–	–	–	2
Slovakia	–	–	–	5th	3rd	3rd	2nd	–	2nd	–	–	5
South Korea	1st	–	–	–	1st	–	–	–	–	–	–	2
Sweden	–	2nd	2nd	–	2nd	–	–	3rd	3rd	3rd	3rd	7

== Pool C ==
Year	Host	Gold	Silver	Bronze
2016	(Serbia); Novi Sad	Austria	Finland	Belgium/Netherlands
2018	(Finland); Vierumäki	China	Finland	Australia
2022	(Thailand); Bangkok	Great Britain	Kazakhstan	France
2024	(Thailand); Bangkok	Finland	Thailand	Austria

=== Participating nations ===
Team	(Serbia); 2016	(Finland); 2018	(Thailand); 2022	(Thailand); 2024	Total
Austria	1st	–	4th	3rd	3
Finland	2nd	2nd	-	1st	3
Benelux	3rd	–	-	–	1
Serbia	4th	-	-	-	1
China	–	1st	-	–	1
Australia	–	3rd	-	4th	1
Great Britain	–	-	1st	–	1
Kazakhstan	–	-	2nd	–	1
France	–	-	3rd	–	1
Thailand	–	-	5th	2nd	2

== See also ==
- Para ice hockey at the Winter Paralympics
- World Para Ice Hockey European Championships
- Ice Hockey World Championships
- Women's World Challenge
- Women's World Para Ice Hockey Championships
