= Czech Republic at the 2026 Winter Paralympics =

- Flag of Czech Republic
- IPC code: CZE
- NPC: Czech Paralympic Committee

in Milan & Cortina d'Ampezzo, Italy 6 March 2026 – 15 March 2026
- Competitors: 24 (22 men and 2 women) in 4 sports
- Flag bearer (opening): Volunteer
- Flag bearer (closing): Volunteer
- Medals Ranked 16th: Gold 1 Silver 4 Bronze 1 Total 6

Winter Paralympics appearances (overview)
- 1994; 1998; 2002; 2006; 2010; 2014; 2018; 2022; 2026

Other related appearances
- Czechoslovakia (1976–1992)

Czech Republic was represented at the 2026 Winter Paralympics in Milan & Cortina d'Ampezzo, Italy, which took place between 6–15 March 2026.

== Medallists ==
Medal	Name	Sport	Event	Date
Gold	Carina Edlingerová; Guide: Alexandr Paťava	Para biathlon	Women's sprint pursuit, visually impaired	13 March
Silver	Carina Edlingerová; Guide: Alexandr Paťava	Para biathlon	Women's sprint, visually impaired	7 March
Silver	Simona Bubeníčková; Guide: David Šrůtek	Para biathlon	Women's individual, visually impaired	8 March
Silver	Simona Bubeníčková; Guide: David Šrůtek	Para cross-country skiing	Women's 10 kilometre classical, visually impaired	11 March
Silver	Simona Bubeníčková; Guide: David Šrůtek	Para cross-country skiing	Women's 20 kilometre freestyle, visually impaired	15 March
Bronze	Simona Bubeníčková; Guide: David Šrůtek	Para biathlon	Women's sprint pursuit, visually impaired	13 March

Medals by sport
Sport	1st place, gold medalist(s)	2nd place, silver medalist(s)	3rd place, bronze medalist(s)	Total
Para biathlon	1	2	1	4
Para cross-country skiing	0	2	0	2
Total	1	4	1	6

Medals by date
Day	Date	1st place, gold medalist(s)	2nd place, silver medalist(s)	3rd place, bronze medalist(s)	Total
Day 1	7 March	0	1	0	1
Day 2	8 March	0	1	0	1
Day 3	9 March	0	0	0	0
Day 4	10 March	0	0	0	0
Day 5	11 March	0	1	0	1
Day 6	12 March	0	0	0	0
Day 7	13 March	1	0	1	2
Day 8	14 March	0	0	0	0
Day 9	15 March	0	1	0	1
Total		1	4	1	6

Medals by gender
Gender	1st place, gold medalist(s)	2nd place, silver medalist(s)	3rd place, bronze medalist(s)	Total
Female	1	4	1	6
Male	0	0	0	0
Mixed	0	0	0	0
Total	1	4	1	6

== Competitors ==
The following is the list of number of competitors participating at the Games per sport/discipline.

Sport	Men	Women	Total
Para alpine skiing	4	0	4
Para biathlon	2	2	4
Para cross-country skiing	2	2	4
Para ice hockey	16	0	16
Total	22	2	24

== Para alpine skiing ==
Athlete	Class	Event	Run 1		Run 2		Total	
Athlete	Class	Event	Time	Rank	Time	Rank	Time	Rank
Petr Drahoš	LW12–1	Men's super-G, sitting	—N/a				DNF	
Petr Drahoš	LW12–1	Men's giant slalom, sitting	1:20.97	21	1:24.04	19	2:45.01	19
Petr Drahoš	LW12–1	Men's slalom, sitting	58.06	17	54.38	17	1:52.44	16
Petr Drahoš	LW12–1	Men's super combined, sitting	1:27.84	19	53.56	15	2:21.40	15
Patrik Hetmer; Guide: Miroslav Máčala	AS4	Men's giant slalom, visually impaired	1:32.64	16	1:31.05	14	3:03.69	14
Patrik Hetmer; Guide: Miroslav Máčala	AS4	Men's slalom, visually impaired	1:12.24	13	1:04.83	13	2:17.07	13
Tadeáš Kříž; Guide: Iva Křížová	AS3	Men's downhill, visually impaired	—N/a				1:25.79	6
Tadeáš Kříž; Guide: Iva Křížová	AS3	Men's super-G, visually impaired	—N/a				1:21.46	10
Tadeáš Kříž; Guide: Iva Křížová	AS3	Men's giant slalom, visually impaired	1:14.95	13	1:13.19	9	2:28.14	9
Tadeáš Kříž; Guide: Iva Křížová	AS3	Men's slalom, visually impaired	53.46	8	50.04	7	1:43.50	8
Tadeáš Kříž; Guide: Iva Křížová	AS3	Men's super combined, visually impaired	1:22.27	9	49.81	9	2:12.08	9
Tomáš Vaverka	LW9–2	Men's giant slalom, standing	1:17.21	24	1:16.57	23	2:33.78	23
Tomáš Vaverka	LW9–2	Men's slalom, standing	1:01.84	23	DNF			

== Para biathlon ==
Athlete	Class	Event	Qualification			Final		
Athlete	Class	Event	Missed shots	Time	Rank	Missed shots	Time	Rank
Miroslav Motejzík	LW4	Men's individual, standing	—N/a			4 (1+1+2+0)	49:26.4	19
Miroslav Motejzík	LW4	Men's sprint, standing	—N/a			3 (0+3)	28:04.4	19
Simona Bubeníčková; Guide: David Šrůtek	NS1	Women's individual, visually impaired	—N/a			1 (0+0+0+1)	36:43.9	2nd place, silver medalist(s)
Simona Bubeníčková; Guide: David Šrůtek	NS1	Women's sprint, visually impaired	—N/a			0 (0+0)	21:06.2	4
Simona Bubeníčková; Guide: David Šrůtek	NS1	Women's sprint pursuit, visually impaired	3 (1+2)	12:17.1	2 Q	1 (0+1)	13:59.2	3rd place, bronze medalist(s)
Carina Edlingerová; Guide: Alexandr Paťava	NS2	Women's individual, visually impaired	—N/a			6 (1+0+2+3)	42:30.8	7
Carina Edlingerová; Guide: Alexandr Paťava	NS2	Women's sprint, visually impaired	—N/a			0 (0+0)	20:20.5	2nd place, silver medalist(s)
Carina Edlingerová; Guide: Alexandr Paťava	NS2	Women's sprint pursuit, visually impaired	1 (0+1)	11:47.8	1 Q	3 (2+1)	13:38.1	1st place, gold medalist(s)

== Para cross-country skiing ==
Athlete	Class	Event	Qualification		Semifinal		Final	
Athlete	Class	Event	Time	Rank	Time	Rank	Time	Rank
Miroslav Motejzík	LW4	Sprint classical, standing	3:22.22	30	Did not advance			
Miroslav Motejzík	LW4	10 km classical, standing	—N/a				DNF	
Miroslav Motejzík	LW4	20 km freestyle, standing	—N/a				1:00:26.9	29
Matěj Škoda	LW8	Sprint classical, standing	2:59.22	28	Did not advance			
Matěj Škoda	LW8	10 km classical, standing	—N/a				32:07.3	13
Matěj Škoda	LW8	20 km freestyle, standing	—N/a				52:25.2	23
Simona Bubeníčková; Guide: David Šrůtek	NS1	Sprint classical, visually impaired	2:51.49	1 Q	3:31.8	3	DNQ	
Simona Bubeníčková; Guide: David Šrůtek	NS1	10 km classical, visually impaired	—N/a				31:59.1	2nd place, silver medalist(s)
Simona Bubeníčková; Guide: David Šrůtek	NS1	20 km freestyle, visually impaired	—N/a				47:27.2	2nd place, silver medalist(s)

Relay

Athletes	Event	Time	Rank
Miroslav Motejzík; Simona Bubeníčková; Guide: David Šrůtek; Matěj Škoda; Matěj Škoda	4 × 2.5km open relay	DNS	

== Para ice hockey ==
Summary

Key:

- OT – Overtime
- GWS – Match decided by penalty-shootout

Team	Event	Group stage				Semifinal / Cl.	Final / BM / Pl.	
Team	Event	Opposition Score	Opposition Score	Opposition Score	Rank	Opposition Score	Opposition Score	Rank
Czech Republic	Mixed tournament	Japan; W 3–2	Slovakia; W 8–1	Canada; L 1–4	2 Q	United States; L 1–6	China; L 2–3	4

Roster

Head coach: Jakub Novotný

- Martin Kudela
- Petr Boček
- Martin Žižlavský
- Radek Zelinka
- Theodor Pátek
- Alex Ohar
- David Vrubel
- Pavel Kubeš
- Václav Hečko
- David Ondrák
- Filip Veselý
- Pavel Doležal
- Michal Geier
- Lukáš Kapko
- Zdeněk Hábl
- Patrik Sedláček

Group play

Pos	Team	Pld	W	OTW	OTL	L	GF	GA	GD	Pts	Qualification
1	Canada	3	3	0	0	0	26	1	+25	9	Semifinals
2	Czechia	3	2	0	0	1	12	7	+5	6	Semifinals
3	Slovakia	3	1	0	0	2	6	17	−11	3	5–8th place semifinals
4	Japan	3	0	0	0	3	3	22	−19	0	5–8th place semifinals

Source: Milano Cortina 2026

7 March 2026; 10:05	Czechia	3–2 (2–1, 1–1, 0–0)	Japan	PalaItalia, Milan; Attendance: 2,083

Game reference

Patrik Sedláček
Goalies
Wataru Horie
Referee:
(United States) Bobby Esposito
Linesmen:
(Canada) Dylan Dauphinee
(Serbia) Tibor Fazekas

	0–1	06:14 – Niitsu (Ukai, Ito)
Zelinka (Hábl) – 08:54	1–1
Geier (Zelinka, Veselý) – 11:04	2–1
	2–2	20:09 – Ito (Matsushita)
Kapko (Geier) (PP) – 23:37	3–2

8 min
Penalties
10 min
30
Shots
4

9 March 2026; 13:35	Czechia	8–1 (2–0, 4–0, 2–1)	Slovakia	PalaItalia, Milan; Attendance: 2,285

Game reference

Martin Kudela
Goalies
Eduard Lepáček
Referee:
(Canada) Patrick Myers
Linesmen:
(Norway) Marius Hermansen Oswold
(Sweden) Andreas Lunden

Veselý – 04:50	1–0
Žižlavský (Ohar) – 12:40	2–0
Žižlavský (Doležal, Zelinka) – 16:10	3–0
Veselý (Hečko, Žižlavský) – 20:05	4–0
Zelinka (Hečko, Veselý) – 23:15	5–0
Doležal (Veselý) – 26:39	6–0
	6–1	32:43 – Korman (Joppa, Ferenčík)
Zelinka (Pátek) – 35:59	7–1
Geier – 36:10	8–1

4 min
Penalties
4 min
30
Shots
9

10 March 2026; 17:05	Canada	4–1 (0–0, 2–1, 2–0)	Czechia	PalaItalia, Milan; Attendance: 1,361

Game reference

Corbin Watson
Goalies
Patrik Sedláček
Referee:
(United States) Bobby Esposito
Linesmen:
(Norway) Marius Hermansen Oswold
(Sweden) Tony Rundström

Dunn (McGregor, Dixon) (PP) – 19:46	1–0
Boily (Jacobs-Webb) (PP) – 27:35	2–0
McGregor (Hickey, Cozzolino) (PP) – 31:57	3–0
	3–1	33:48 – Hábl (Doležal, Zelinka) (PP)
Hickey (McGregor) (EN) – 44:50	4–1

12 min
Penalties
12 min
26
Shots
12

Semifinal

13 March 2026; 14:35	United States	6–1 (1–1, 2–0, 3–0)	Czechia	PalaItalia, Milan; Attendance: 3,016

Game reference

Griffin LaMarre
Goalies
Patrik Sedláček
Referee:
(Canada) Matthew Fergenbaum
Linesmen:
(Canada) Dylan Dauphinee
(Sweden) Andreas Lunden

	0–1	05:08 – Geier (Kubeš, Kapko) (PP)
Farmer (Dodson, Eustace) – 10:26	1–1
Eustace (Farmer) – 19:59	2–1
Farmer (Eustace, Dodson) – 20:18	3–1
Pauls (Farmer, Grove) – 35:19	4–1
Farmer (Roybal, Pauls) – 37:52	5–1
Grove (Roybal, Farmer) (PP) – 38:49	6–1

4 min
Penalties
8 min
41
Shots
5

Bronze medal game

15 March 2026; 12:05	China	3–2 (2–2, 0–0, 1–0)	Czechia	PalaItalia, Milan; Attendance: 3,962

Game reference

Ji Yanzhao
Goalies
Patrik Sedláček
Referee:
(Canada) Patrick Myers
Linesmen:
(United States) Brendan Lewis
(Sweden) Andreas Lunden

	0–1	01:40 – Kubeš (Geier, Kapko)
	0–2	02:34 – Zelinka (Žižlavský, Doležal)
Tian (Shen) – 06:03	1–2
Wang Z. (Zhu, Zhang) – 08:05	2–2
Tian (Shen) – 30:18	3–2

8 min
Penalties
2 min
23
Shots
16

== See also ==
- Czech Republic at the Paralympics
- Czech Republic at the 2026 Winter Olympics
