= 2024 World Para Ice Hockey Championships =

Tournament details
- Host country: Canada
- Venue(s): Winsport Arena, Calgary
- Dates: 4–12 May
- Teams: 8

Final positions
- Champions: Canada (5th title)
- Runners-up: United States
- Third place: Czech Republic
- Fourth place: China

Tournament statistics
- Games played: 20
- Goals scored: 132 (6.6 per game)
- Attendance: 4,603 (230 per game)
- Scoring leader(s): (United States) Declan Farmer (11 goals)

Awards
- MVP: (United States) Declan Farmer

Official website
- Calgary 2024

The 2024 World Para Ice Hockey Championships was the 13th edition of World Para Ice Hockey Championships (originally named IPC Ice Sledge Hockey World Championships) held in 2024. The tournament was held in Calgary, Alberta in Canada from 4 to 12 May.

Canada won their fifth title on home soil, defeating the United States, 2–1, in an upset in the final.

== Format ==
The teams are once again divided into two groups based on their ranking, however contrary to previous years, the top 2 teams in each group go to the Semi-Finals. The bottom 2 teams in each group will play in the 5–8th place Semi-Finals.

== Teams ==
Japan and Slovakia were promoted to Pool A after finishing first and second respectively in Pool B. They both replace Norway and Germany, who both were relegated. For the first time ever, the top division boasts three Asian teams.

Group A

- United States
- China
- South Korea
- Slovakia – Promoted from Pool B in 2023

Group B

- Canada
- Czech Republic
- Italy
- Japan – Promoted from Pool B in 2023

== Preliminary round ==
All times are local (UTC−6)

=== Group A ===
Pos	Team	Pld	W	OTW	OTL	L	GF	GA	GD	Pts	Qualification
1	United States	3	3	0	0	0	31	0	+31	9	Semifinals
2	China	3	2	0	0	1	20	10	+10	6	Semifinals
3	Slovakia	3	1	0	0	2	4	22	−18	3	5–8th place Semi-Finals
4	South Korea	3	0	0	0	3	2	25	−23	0	5–8th place Semi-Finals

Updated to match(es) played on unknown. Source: IPC

4 May; 10:00	United States	10−0 (3−0, 3−0, 4−0)	Slovakia	Winsport Arena, Calgary; Attendance: 37

Jen Lee
Goalies
Eduward Lepacek
Referee:
(Czech Republic) Jan Vanek
Linesmen:
(Czech Republic) Pavel Blazek
(Sweden) Andreas Lunden

Eustace (Wallace) - 3:44	1−0
Farmer (Jones, Nichols) - 4:57	2−0
Farmer (Jones) - 8:27	3−0
Jones (Nichols, Pauls) - 16:10	4−0
Farmer (Jones) - 20:24	5−0
Roybal (Misiewicz) - 20:52	6−0
Douglas (Grove, Jones) - 31:42	7−0
Musselman (Wallace, Pauls) - 32:45	8−0
Farmer (Nichols, Jones) - 34:36	9−0
Wallace (Roybal, Misiewicz) - 43:57	10−0

0 min
Penalties
4 min
31
Shots
0

4 May; 13:30	China	10−0 (1−0, 8−0, 1−0)	South Korea	Winsport Arena, Calgary; Attendance: 73

Ji Yanzhao
Goalies
Hyuk Jun Choi
Referee:
(United States) Bobby Esposito
Linesmen:
(Canada) Dylan Dauphinee
(United States) Brendan Lewis

Tian (Zhang) - 1:21	1−0
Zhu (Wang) - pp - 15:49	2−0
Song (Hu) - 16:15	3−0
Li (Tiang) - 17:10	4−0
Li (Tian) - 18:35	5−0
Zhu (Shen) - 23:47	6−0
Qiu - 26:47	7−0
Hu (Tian, Li) - 28:03	8−0
Zhu (Shen, Xu) - 29:09	9−0
Tian - 42:10	10−0

35 min
Penalties
33 min
28
Shots
8

5 May; 10:00	China	10−0 (2−0, 6−0, 2−0)	Slovakia	Winsport Arena, Calgary; Attendance: 71

Ji Yanzhao
Goalies
Eduard Lepacek
Referee:
(Netherlands) Chris Van Grinsen
Linesmen:
(Norway) Marius Hermansen-Oswold
(Sweden) Tony Rundstrom

Shen (Wang) - 11:59	1−0
Song (Li) - 14:45	2−0
Song (Zhang) - 17:29	3−0
Wang (Zhu, Zhang) - 19:56	4−0
Wang (Xu, Zhang) - 23:04	5−0
Shen (Zhu, Zhang) - 26:41	6−0
Li (Qiu, Lyu) - 27:18	7−0
Song (Li, Lyu) - 28:56	8−0
Shen (Xu) - pp - 34:09	9−0
Xu (Li, Wang) - 39:59	10−0

4 min
Penalties
8 min
35
Shots
5

5 May; 13:30	South Korea	0−11 (0–8, 0–3, 0–0)	United States	Winsport Arena, Calgary; Attendance: 72

Daehan Bong
Goalies
Griffin LaMarre
Referee:
(Canada) Kevin Webinger
Linesmen:
(Czech Republic) Pavel Blazek
(Sweden) Andreas Lunden

0−1	Misiewicz (Pauls) - pp - 3:59
0−2	Nichols - 4:31
0−3	Misiewicz (Farmer, Wallace) - pp - 5:58
0−4	Dodson (McKee, Bolton) - 6:28
0−5	Farmer (Wallace) - 8:08
0−6	Farmer (Pauls) - 11:24
0−7	Farmer (Wallace) - 12:48
0−8	Eustace (Dodson, Wallace) - 13:36
0−9	Jones (Farmer, Pauls) - 19:39
0−10	Musselman (Wallace, Roybal) - 23:36
0−11	McKee (Dodson, Eustace) - 24:14

8 min
Penalties
4 min
4
Shots
20

7 May; 10:00	Slovakia	4−2 (0−2, 0−0, 4−0)	South Korea	Winsport Arena, Calgary; Attendance: 46

Eduard Lepacek
Goalies
Hyuk Jun Choi
Referee:
(Sweden) Johansson
Linesmen:
(Norway) Hermansen-Oswold
(Slovakia) Hus

	0−1	Yang (Yung, Choi) - 6:55
	0−2	Yu (Kim) - 7:52
Joppa (Vecerek, Fojtik) - 33:06	1−2
Joppa - PS - 35:58	2−2
Stasak (Joppa) - pp - 40:08	3−2
Joppa (Ligda) - 42:07	4–2

23 min
Penalties
15 min
2
Shots
2

7 May; 13:30	United States	10−0 (1−0, 7−0, 2−0)	China	Winsport Arena, Calgary; Attendance: 101

Jen Lee
Goalies
Wang Wei
Referee:
(Czech Republic) Vanek
Linesmen:
(Canada) Dauphinee
(Sweden) Rundstrom

Farmer (Pauls, Grove) - pp - 11:50	1−0
Farmer (Misiewicz, Pauls) - pp - 15:34	2−0
Douglas (Farmer) - 15:49	3−0
Dodson (Pauls) - 16:11	4−0
Grove (Farmer) - pp - 20:35	5−0
Jones (Farmer, Nichols) - 21:32	6−0
Pauls (Roybal, Farmer) - pp - 25:41	7−0
Jones (Nichols, Farmer) - 29:06	8−0
McKee - 38:33	9−0
Farmer - 43:38	10−0

4 min
Penalties
12 min
30
Shots
3

=== Group B ===
Pos	Team	Pld	W	OTW	OTL	L	GF	GA	GD	Pts	Qualification
1	Canada (H)	3	3	0	0	0	34	1	+33	9	Semi-Finals
2	Czech Republic	3	2	0	0	1	10	6	+4	6	Semi-Finals
3	Japan	3	0	1	0	2	2	25	−23	2	5–8th place Semi-Finals
4	Italy	3	0	0	1	2	2	16	−14	1	5–8th place Semi-Finals

Updated to match(es) played on unknown. Source: IPC
(H) Host

4 May; 17:00	Canada	19–0 (10−0, 8−0, 1−0)	Japan	Winsport Arena, Calgary; Attendance: 403

Adam Kingsmill
Goalies
Wataru Horie
Referee:
(Sweden) Niklas Johansson
Linesmen:
(Slovakia) Igor Hus
(Sweden) Tony Rundstrom

Hickey (Armstrong) - 0:47	1−0
Jacobs-Webb (Dunn, Henry) - 1:15	2−0
Cozzolino (McGregor) - 2:02	3−0
Hickey (Cozzolino, McGregor) - 2:18	4−0
McGregor (Hickey, Henry) - 5:10	5−0
Cozzolino (Hickey, McGregor) - 8:12	6−0
McGregor (Cozzolino, Hickey)- pp - 12:30	7−0
Dixon (Boily, Smith) - 13:12	8−0
Jacobs-Webb (Kovacevich, Henry) - 13:48	9−0
Smith (Boily, Dixon) - 14:19	10−0
Dixon (Henry, Smith) - 18:54	11−0
Kovacevich (Armstrong, Dunn) - 20:30	12−0
McGregor (Cozzolino) - 22:16	13−0
Cozzolino (Hickey, Henry) - 23:01	14−0
Boily (Smith, Dixon) - 23:47	15−0
Halbert (Lavin) - 25:31	16−0
Hickey (McGregor, Cozzolino) - 26:40	17−0
Dixon (Smith, Boily) - 27:44	18−0
Cozzolino (Dunn) - 39:34	19−0

0 min
Penalties
4 min
49
Shots
1

4 May; 20:30	Czech Republic	4−1 (2−0, 1−0, 1−1)	Italy	Winsport Arena, Calgary; Attendance: 76

Martin Kudela
Goalies
Santino Stillitano
Referee:
(Canada) Kevin Webinger
Linesmen:
(Norway) Marius Hermansen-Oswold
(Norway) Mathias Norum-Ripel

Hecko (Zizlavsky) - 0:39	1−0
Ohar (Habl, Kubes) - 14:12	2−0
Dolezal (Zelinka) - 26:06	3−0
	3−1	Larch (Depaoli - pp - 38:30
Filip Vesely - 40:16	4−1

4 min
Penalties
6 min
32
Shots
5

5 May; 17:00	Italy	0−10 (0−2, 0−5, 0−3)	Canada	Winsport Arena, Calgary; Attendance: 308

Julian Kasslatter Santino Stillitano
Goalies
Corbin Watson
Referee:
(Czech Republic) Jan Vanek
Linesmen:
(United States) Brendan Lewis
(Norway) Mathias Norum-Ripel

0−1	Cozzolino (Hickey, Lavin) - 5:54
0−2	McGregor (Cozzolino, Hickey) - pp - 12:49
0−3	Hickey (McGregor) - 16:39
0−4	Dunn (Hickey) - pp - 19:43
0−5	McGregor - 20:10
0−6	McGregor (Hickey, Lavin) - 24:09
0−7	Hickey (Cozzolino) - pp - 27:01
0−8	McGregor (Halbert, Cozzolino) - pp - 30:21
0−9	Smith (Armstrong, Jacobs-Webb) - 32:43
0−10	Lavin (Henry, Dixon) - 38:25

12 min
Penalties
4 min
2
Shots
32

5 May; 20:30	Czech Republic	5−0 (3−0, 1−0, 1−0)	Japan	Winsport Arena, Calgary; Attendance: 62

Martin Kudela
Goalies
Wataru Horie
Referee:
(Sweden) Niklas Johansson
Linesmen:
(Canada) Dylan Dauphinee
(Slovakia) Igor Hus

Zizlavsky (Dolezal, Vesely) 3:01	1−0
Vesely (Hecko, Zizlavsky) - pp - 4:46	2−0
Hecko (Zelinka) - pp - 9:10	3−0
Habl (Zelinka, Dolezal) - pp - 20:32	4−0
Vesely (Kubes) - 37:50	5−0

10 min
Penalties
6 min
19
Shots
8

7 May; 17:00	Canada	5−1 (1−1, 3−0, 1−0)	Czech Republic	Winsport Arena, Calgary; Attendance: 446

Adam Kingsmill
Goalies
Martin Kudela
Referee:
(United States) Esposito
Linesmen:
(Czech Republic) Blazek
(United States) Lewis

McGregor (Cozzolino, Lavin) - 3:49	1−0
	1−1	Vesely (Heck) - 14:33
McGregor (Hickey, Halbert) - 15:11	2−1
Dunn (Cozzolino, Hickey) - pp - 15:54	3−1
Hickey (Cozzolino, Halbert) - 26:12	4−1
Dunn - 42:24	5−1

10 min
Penalties
2 min
14
Shots
13

7 May; 20:30	Japan	2−1 GWS (0−0, 1−1, 0−0,) (OT: 0–0) (SO: 1–0)	Italy	Winsport Arena, Calgary; Attendance: 61

Wataru Horie
Goalies
Julian Kasslatter
Referee:
(Netherlands) Van Grinsen
Linesmen:
(Sweden) Lunden
(Norway) Norum-Ripel

	0−1	Kumagai - SH - 25:02
Depaoli (Rosa, Remotti-Marnini) - 15:51	1−1
Kumagai (SOW)	2−1

Ito (miss)
Uehara (miss)
Kumagai
Shootout
(miss) Depaoli
(miss) Larch
(miss) Macri
10 min
Penalties
4 min
15
Shots
27

== Knockout stage ==
=== 5–8th place bracket ===
5–8th place semifinals
8 May
Slovakia	2
Italy	1
8 May
Japan	1
South Korea	5

Fifth place
11 May
Slovakia	1
South Korea	3
Seventh place
11 May
Italy	1
Japan	0

==== 5–8th place semifinals ====
8 May; 13:30	Slovakia	2–1 (1–0, 1–1, 0–0)	Italy	Winsport Arena, Calgary; Attendance: 216

Eduard Lepacek
Goalies
Santino Stillitano
Referee:
(Sweden) Niklas Johansson
Linesmen:
(Slovakia) Igor Hus
(Norway) Mathias Norum-Ripel

Joppa (Vecerek) - pp - 11:40	1–0
	1–1	Rosa (Kafmann) - pp - 24:55
Joppa (Ligda) - 28:56	2–1

4 min
Penalties
8 min
9
Shots
14

8 May; 17:30	Japan	1–5 (0–2, 1–1, 0–2)	South Korea	Winsport Arena, Calgary; Attendance: 81

Wataru Horie
Goalies
Hyuk Jun Choi
Referee:
(Czech Republic) Jan Vanek
Linesmen:
(Czech Republic) Pavel Blazek
(Norway) Marius Hermansen-Oswold

	0–1	Jung - 5:43
	0–2	Jang (Cho, Jung) - 11:45
	0–3	Kim (Jung) - 21:41
Kumagai (Uehara, Ito) - 29:16	1–3
	1–4	Cho (Choi, Jung) - pp - 39:34
	1–5	Jung - ENG - 42:35

6 min
Penalties
4 min
13
Shots
25

==== Seventh place game ====
11 May; 13:30	Italy	1–0 (0–0, 0–0, 1–0)	Japan	Winsport Arena, Calgary; Attendance: 98

Santino Stillitano	Goalies	Wataru Horie
Depaoli (Rosa) - 41:22 / 1–0
2 min	Penalties	0 min
12	Shots	28

==== Fifth place game ====
11 May; 17:30	Slovakia	1–3 (1–0, 0–2, 0–1)	South Korea	Winsport Arena, Calgary; Attendance: 123

Eduard Lepacek
Goalies
Hyuk Jun Choi

Turic (Korman, Fojtik) - 5:19	1–0
	1–1	Yang (Choi) - 26:59
	1–2	Jung - 27:07
	1–3	Jung - ENG - 44:59

6 min
Penalties
8 min
13
Shots
16

=== Bracket ===
Semifinals
10 May
United States	3
Czech Republic	1
10 May
Canada	2
China	1

Final
12 May
United States	1
Canada	2
Third place
12 May
Czech Republic	3
China	2

=== Semifinals ===
10 May; 13:30	United States	3–1 (1–0, 0–0, 2–1)	Czech Republic	Winsport Arena, Calgary; Attendance: 160

Griffin LaMarre
Goalies
Martin Kudela

Douglas (Farmer) - pp - 8:56	1–0
	1–1	Zizlavsky (Hecko, Vesely) - 35:11
Jones (Farmer, Pauls) - 37:59	2–1
Douglas (Roybal) - ENG - 44:40	3–1

6 min
Penalties
6 min
22
Shots
7

10 May; 17:30	Canada	2–1 (0-1, 0–0, 2–0)	China	Winsport Arena, Calgary; Attendance: 646

Adam Kingsmill
Goalies
Wang Wei

	0–1	Tian (Li) - pp - 11:47
Kovacevich (McGregor, Jacobs-Webb) - 31:19	1–1
Cozzolino (Hickey, McGregor) - 32:43	2–1

2 min
Penalties
4 min
17
Shots
15

=== Bronze medal game ===
12 May; 13:30	Czech Republic	3–2 (2–1, 1–1, 0–0)	China	Winsport Arena, Calgary; Attendance: 240

Ji Yanzhao
Goalies
Martin Kudela

Hecko - pp - 13:07	1–0
	1–1	Wang (Shen) - 9:31
Ohar (Kubes) - 13:24	2–1
Kubes (Geier) - 17:34	3–1
	3–2	Zhu (Shen) - 18:07

8 min
Penalties
4 min
14
Shots
10

=== Final ===
12 May; 17:30	United States	1–2 (0–1, 0–1, 1–0)	Canada	Winsport Arena, Calgary; Attendance: 1,283

Jen Lee
Goalies
Adam Kingsmill

	0–1	Cozzolino (McGregor) - 0:35
	0–2	Jacobs-Webb (McGregor) - 24:06
Farmer (Nichols, Jones) - 41:19	1–2

6 min
Penalties
4 min
9
Shots
25

== Final standings ==
Pos	Grp	Team	Pld	W	OTW	OTL	L	GF	GA	GD	Pts	Final result
1	B	Canada (H)	5	5	0	0	0	38	3	+35	15	Champions
2	A	United States	5	4	0	0	1	35	3	+32	12	Runners-up
3	B	Czech Republic	5	3	0	0	2	14	11	+3	9	Third place
4	A	China	5	2	0	0	3	23	15	+8	6	Fourth place
5	A	South Korea	5	2	0	0	3	10	27	−17	6	Fifth place game
6	A	Slovakia	5	2	0	0	3	7	26	−19	6	Fifth place game
7	B	Italy	5	1	0	1	3	4	18	−14	4	Relegated to Pool B
8	B	Japan	5	0	1	0	4	3	31	−28	2	Relegated to Pool B

Updated to match(es) played on unknown. Source:
(H) Host

== Pool B ==
2024 World Para Ice Hockey Championships Pool B
Tournament details
- Host country: Norway
- Venue(s): Fritidspark, Skien
- Dates: 15–20 April
- Teams: 6

Final positions
- Champions: Norway (1st title)
- Runners-up: Germany
- Third place: Sweden
- Fourth place: Kazakhstan

Tournament statistics
- Games played: 15
- Goals scored: 171 (11.4 per game)
- Attendance: 2,065 (138 per game)

Official website
- Skien 2024

Pool B was hosted in Skien, Norway at the Fritidspark. The hosts Norway won the championship and along with Germany, have been promoted to the A division for next year, while Great Britain were relegated to Pool C for the 2025 tournament.

=== Participants ===
Team	Qualification
Norway	Host Seventh and relegated from Pool A in 2023.
Germany	Eighth and relegated from Pool A in 2023.
Sweden	Placed 3rd in Pool B in 2023.
Kazakhstan	Placed 4th in Pool B in 2023.
Great Britain	Placed 5th in Pool B in 2023.
France	Placed 3rd in Pool C in 2023 and was promoted. (Note: From this edition onwards, Group C no longer provided its winner's place for the higher division of the same year, and because of this, there was one place left, this was given to France. which had taken 3rd place in Group C)

=== Results ===
Pos	Team	Pld	W	OTW	OTL	L	GF	GA	GD	Pts	Qualification or relegation
1	Norway (H)	5	4	1	0	0	57	3	+54	14	Advanced to Pool A
2	Germany	5	4	0	1	0	60	6	+54	13	Advanced to Pool A
3	Sweden	5	3	0	0	2	27	9	+18	9	
4	Kazakhstan	5	2	0	0	3	17	25	−8	6	
5	France	5	0	1	0	4	4	64	−60	2	
6	Great Britain	5	0	0	1	4	6	64	−58	1	Relegated to Pool C

Source: IPC
(H) Host

All times are local.

15 April; 11:00	Germany	23–1 (9–0, 5–1, 9–0)	Great Britain	Fritidspark; Attendance: 52

Hackworth
Muehlhans
Goalies
Kunst
Hill
Referee:
Matt Fergenbaum (CAN)
Linesmen:
Tom Lonnqvist (FIN)
Alexander Wiest (ITA)

Schrader (Rennhack, Pabst) – 1:24	1–0
Schrader – 1:59	2–0
Schrader (Raedler, Pabst) – sh – 4:00	3–0
Rennhack (Wedde, Pabst) – sh – 4:19	4–0
Schrader (Felderhoff, Pabst) – pp – 5:49	5–0
Schrader (Reimann, Pabst) – 10:23	6–0
Pabst (Hering) – 11:02	7–0
Betz (Wedde) – 11:18	8–0
Rennhack (Hering) – 14:17	9–0
Schrader (Brelage) – sh – 17:38	10–0
Bussmann (Muehlhans) – 18:49	11–0
Schrader – 20:32	12–0
Hering (Pabst, Rennhack) – 24:52	13–0
	13–1	27:30 – pp – Farmer (Nicholson)
Kuhli-Lauenstein (Schrader) – 28:08	14–1
Rennhack (Hering, Brelage) – 31:48	15–1
Schrader (Brelage) – 32:06	16–1
Reimann (Schrader) – 32:48	17–1
Pilz (Brelage) – 33:32	18–1
Hering – 33:47	19–1
Hering – 39:30	20–1
Bussmann (Schrader) – sh – 40:20	21–1
Hering – sh – 41:51	22–1
Kuhli-Lauenstein (Schrader, Bussmann) – 44:14	23–1

8 min
Penalties
2 min
50
Shots
5

15 April; 15:00	Sweden	3–1 (1–0, 2–0, 0–1)	Kazakhstan	Fritidspark; Attendance: 57

U. Nilsson
Goalies
Basmanov
Referee:
Stian Flaten (NOR)
Linesmen:
Przemyslaw Iwaniec (POL)
Ryan O'Rourke (CAN)

P. Nilsson (Liljebaek) – 4:38	1–0
Meng (Liljebaek, Lopez) – 15:36	2–0
Ojala (Lopez) – pp – 22:52	3–0
	3–1	32:16 – Akhmetov (Karipbayev)

0 min
Penalties
8 min
6
Shots
10

15 April; 19:00	France	0–25 (0–9, 0–8, 0–8)	Norway	Fritidspark; Attendance: 244

Blavette
Aknin
Goalies
Sundt
Haugen
Referee:
Simone Lega (ITA)
Linesmen:
Tibor Fazekas (SRB)
Barney Ward (GBR)

0–1	1:29 – Varnes (Solberg, Bakke)
0–2	2:59 – Varnes
0–3	3:47 – Oiseth (Nordstoga, Bakke)
0–4	6:27 – sh – Kronberg (Hamre, Klakegg)
0–5	8:46 – Klakegg (Skolbekken, Solberg)
0–6	11:00 – pp – Lyngroth (Oiseth, Bakke)
0–7	12:16 – Oiseth (Solberg, Skolbekken)
0–8	13:35 – Oiseth (Klakegg, Skolbekken)
0–9	13:47 – Lyngroth (Kronberg, Hamre)
0–10	15:49 – Oiseth (Klakegg)
0–11	16:00 – Bakke (Nordstoga, Lyngroth)
0–12	16:23 – Nordstoga (Lyngroth, Kronberg)
0–13	18:22 – Oiseth (Nordstoga, Solberg)
0–14	18:44 – Nordstoga (Solberg, Oiseth)
0–15	20:14 – sh – Oeverli (Lyngroth, Klakegg)
0–16	26:47 – Varnes (Klakegg, Oiseth)
0–17	28:56 – pp – Bakke (Oiseth, Solberg)
0–18	31:23 – Oiseth (Solberg, Varnes)
0–19	32:16 – Lyngroth (Hamre, Bakke)
0–20	34:26 – pp – Varnes (Oiseth, Lyngroth)
0–21	36:12 – Lyngroth (Hamre, Nordstoga)
0–22	40:54 – Solberg (Skolbekken, Oiseth)
0–23	41:10 – Lyngroth (Hamre, Kronberg)
0–24	42:51 – Nordstoga (Groesfjeld, Oeverli)
0–25	44:26 – Bakke

8 min
Penalties
6 min
0
Shots
57

16 April; 11:00	Germany	12–1 (6–0, 4–0, 2–1)	Kazakhstan	Fritidspark; Attendance: 45

Kunst
Muehlhans
Goalies
Basmanov
Referee:
Marcus Vik Skau (NOR)
Linesmen:
Lari Niittyla (FIN)
Alexander Wiest (ITA)

Wedde (Rennhack, Hering) – 00:24	1–0
Schrader (Hering, Rennhack) – 1:18	2–0
Wedde (Hering, Rennhack) – 3:56	3–0
Hering (Stumpe, Rennhack) – 9:08	4–0
Hering (Schrader, Rennhack) – pp – 13:24	5–0
Schrader – 13:49	6–0
Hering – 15:12	7–0
Kuhli-Lauenstein (Stumpe, Rennhack) – 18:02	8–0
Hering (Schrader, Rennhack) – pp – 20:49	9–0
Schrader (Raedler, Bussmann) – 22:58	10–0
Hering (Wedde) – 39:12	11–0
	11–1	41:10 – Toktarbayev (Paskhalidi)
Kuhli-Lauenstein (Schrader, Bussmann) – 44:25	12–1

4 min
Penalties
6 min
33
Shots
11

16 April; 15:00	Sweden	12–1 (3–1, 4–0, 5–0)	France	Fritidspark; Attendance: 53

Jansson
Goalies
Blavette
Referee:
Stian Flaten (NOR)
Linesmen:
Ryan O'Rourke (CAN)
Barney Ward (GBR)

Lopez (Szeplaky) – 00:58	1–0
	1–1	5:51 – Linier
Persson (Liljebaek, Lopez) – 6:22	2–1
Nilsson (Liljebaek, Eklund) – 12:26	3–1
Lopez (Eklund, Nilsson) – 16:57	4–1
Lopez (Liljebaek, Nilsson) – pp – 23:19	5–1
Nilsson (Lopez, Liljebaek) – pp – 25:16	6–1
Nilsson (Liljebaek, Lopez) – pp – 28:05	7–1
Lopez (Meng, Liljebaek) – 30:57	8–1
Meng (Liljebaek, Nilsson) – sh – 34:23	9–1
Liljebaek (Meng, Lopez) – 36:03	10–1
Ojala (Liljebaek, Nilsson) – pp – 42:57	11–1
Nilsson (Szeplaky, Lopez) – sh – 44:20	12–1

6 min
Penalties
10 min
34
Shots
4

16 April; 19:00	Great Britain	0–18 (0–9, 0–8, 0–1)	Norway	Fritidspark; Attendance: 284

Hackworth
Hill
Goalies
Haugen
Referee:
Matt Fergenbaum (CAN)
Linesmen:
Tibor Fazekas (SRB)
Tom Lonnqvist (FIN)

0–1	00:47 – Lyngroth (Hamre, Kronberg)
0–2	1:48 – Varnes (Skolbekken, Solberg)
0–3	4:30 – Oiseth (Bakke, Groesfjeld)
0–4	5:17 – Solberg (Oiseth, Bakke)
0–5	9:03 – Oiseth (Solberg, Bakke)
0–6	10:10 – Bakke (Kristoffersen)
0–7	10:32 – pp – Bakke (Kirstistuen)
0–8	11:25 – pp – Oiseth (Solberg, Bakke)
0–9	11:54 – Skolbekken (Oiseth)
0–10	17:15 – Hamre (Lyngroth, Oeverli)
0–11	18:43 – Hamre (Kronberg, Oeverli)
0–12	20:28 – Solberg (Bakke)
0–13	21:49 – pp – Oiseth (Solberg, Bakke)
0–14	24:26 – sh – Bakke (Kirstistuen)
0–15	27:33 – sh – Lyngroth
0–16	28:27 – Solberg (Skolbekken, Oiseth)
0–17	28:57 – Bakke (Kirstistuen)
0–18	40:13 – Oiseth

6 min
Penalties
8 min
4
Shots
48

17 April; 11:00	Germany	4–0 (2–0, 1–0, 1–0)	Sweden	Fritidspark; Attendance: 49

Kunst
Goalies
Nilsson
Referee:
Stian Flaten (NOR)
Linesmen:
Lari Niittyla (FIN)
Ryan O'Rourke (CAN)

Schrader (Kuhli-Lauenstein) – 11:18	1–0
Hering – sh – 12:21	2–0
Schrader (Pabst, Kuhli-Lauenstein) – pp – 25:36	3–0
Bussmann (Schrader) – 44:56	4–0

8 min
Penalties
2 min
18
Shots
7

17 April; 15:00	Great Britain	2–3 OT (0–1, 2–0, 0–1, 0–1)	France	Fritidspark; Attendance: 74

Hackworth
Goalies
Blavette
Referee:
Marcus Vik Skau (NOR)
Linesmen:
Tibor Fazekas (SRB)
Tom Lonnqvist (FIN)

	0–1	3:44 – pp – Navarro (Demol)
Nicholson (Farmer, le Galloudec) – 15:41	1–1
Nicholson (Farmer, le Galloudec) – 28:11	2–1
	2–2	43:41 – Cadonna
	2–3	49:13 – Linier (Forgacs)

4 min
Penalties
8 min
22
Shots
12

17 April; 19:00	Norway	7–0 (3–0, 1–0, 3–0)	Kazakhstan	Fritidspark; Attendance: 175

Sundt
Goalies
Basmanov
Referee:
Simone Lega (ITA)
Linesmen:
Przemyslaw Iwaniec (POL)
Alexander Wiest (ITA)

Oiseth (Lyngroth, Varnes) – 5:14	1–0
Varnes (Soverg, Skolbekken) – 7:39	2–0
Solberg (Lyngroth, Oiseth) – pp – 14:41	3–0
Nordstoga (Varnes, Solberg) – 16:23	4–0
Oiseth (Solberg, Skolbekken) – 35:56	5–0
Bakke (Oiseth) – 38:47	6–0
Bakke (Varnes) – pp – 44:07	7–0

2 min
Penalties
8 min
20
Shots
7

19 April; 11:00	Kazakhstan	8–3 (1–0, 3–2, 4–1)	Great Britain	Fritidspark; Attendance: 141

Mukatov
Goalies
Hackworth
Referee:
Marcus Vik Skau (NOR)
Linesmen:
Tom Lonnqvist (FIN)
Lari Niittyla (FIN)

Karipbayev (Toktarbayev) – sh – 9:23	1–0
Toktarbayev (Akhmetov, Bexultan) – 15:34	2–0
Bexultan (Toktarbayev) – 21:57	3–0
	3–1	23:23 – O'Brien
	3–2	26:12 – pp – Nicholson (Quirk, Farmer)
Miyanov (Bexultan) – 29:24	4–2
	4–3	33:00 – Nicholson (le Galloudec)
Karipbayev – 37:57	5–3
Bexultan (Sabirov, Miyanov) – 41:48	6–3
Bexultan (Bondarenko) – 43:01	7–3
Bexultan (Karipbayev, Toktarbayev) – pp – 43:43	8–3

4 min
Penalties
6 min
31
Shots
6

19 April; 15:00	France	0–18 (0–8, 0–4, 0–6)	Germany	Fritidspark; Attendance: 97

Blavette
Goalies
Muehlhans
Referee:
Simone Lega (ITA)
Linesmen:
Przemyslaw Iwaniec (POL)
Barney Ward (GBR)

0–1	2:07 – Stumpe (Brelage, Hering)
0–2	4:25 – pp – Rennhack (Schrader, Pabst)
0–3	5:18 – Brelage
0–4	5:28 – Raedler (Rennhack, Pabst)
0–5	7:41 – Schrader (Bussmann, Kuhli-Lauenstein)
0–6	10:46 – Schrader (Kuhli-Lauenstein, Bussmann)
0–7	11:03 – Brelage (Betz, Reimann)
0–8	14:38 – Schrader
0–9	16:05 – Hering
0–10	16:31 – Bussmann (Kuhli-Lauenstein, Schrader)
0–11	21:42 – sh – Schrader (Pabst, Raedler)
0–12	22:54 – Brelage (Hering, Reimann)
0–13	31:08 – Hering (Pabst, Felderhoff)
0–14	32:11 – Schrader (Stumpe, Bussmann)
0–15	37:20 – pp – Kuhli-Lauenstein (Rennhack, Schrader)
0–16	40:55 – sh – Raedler (Hering, Rennhack)
0–17	42:11 – Schrader (Brelage, Bussmann)
0–18	42:47 – Betz (Pabst, Kuhli-Lauenstein)

4 min
Penalties
6 min
2
Shots
39

19 April; 19:00	Norway	3–0 (0–0, 3–0, 0–0)	Sweden	Fritidspark; Attendance: 311

Sundt
Goalies
Nilsson
Referee:
Matt Fergenbaum (CAN)
Linesmen:
Ryan O'Rourke (CAN)
Alexander Wiest (ITA)

Bakke (Skolbekken) – 16:41	1–0
Bakke (Oiseth) – 22:43	2–0
Varnes (Oiseth, Bakke) – pp – 27:03	3–0

6 min
Penalties
6 min
23
Shots
9

20 April; 11:00	Kazakhstan	7–0 (3–0, 2–0, 2–0)	France	Fritidspark; Attendance: 32

Basmanov
Goalies
Blavette
Referee:
Stian Flaten (NOR)
Linesmen:
Lari Niittyla (FIN)
Barney Ward (GBR)

Miyanov (Bexultan, Toktarbayev) – 1:51	1–0
Karipbayev (Bexultan) – sh – 4:44	2–0
Toktarbayev (Karipbayev) – 13:48	3–0
Karipbayev (Bexultan) – 16:36	4–0
Shormanov – 17:04	5–0
Toktarbayev (Karipbayev) – 31:23	6–0
Miyanov (Karipbayev) – 35:34	7–0

6 min
Penalties
8 min
33
Shots
3

20 April; 15:00	Sweden	12–0 (2–0, 5–0, 5–0)	Great Britain	Fritidspark; Attendance: 49

Jansson
Goalies
Hackworth
Hill
Referee:
Marcus Vik Skau (NOR)
Linesmen:
Przemyslaw Iwaniec (POL)
Tom Lonnqvist (FIN)

Ojala (Liljebaek, Lopez) – pp – 7:40	1–0
Lopez (Nilsson) – 9:55	2–0
Lopez (Liljebaek) – 18:13	3–0
Lopez – 18:37	4–0
Meng (Eklund) – 22:47	5–0
Lopez – 23:02	6–0
Liljebaek (Lopez) – 25:02	7–0
Lopez (Liljebaek) – 34:30	8–0
Lopez – 38:51	9–0
Nilsson (Meng, Strandmark) – 39:15	10–0
Meng Szeplaky, Nilsson) – 39:37	11–0
Nilsson (Meng) – 44:58	12–0

2 min
Penalties
6 min
34
Shots
1

20 April; 19:00	Norway	4–3 OT (1–1, 1–2, 1–0, 1–0)	Germany	Fritidspark; Attendance: 402

Sundt
Goalies
Kunst
Referee:
Matt Fergenbaum (CAN)
Linesmen:
Tibor Fazekas (SRB)
Alexander Wiest (ITA)

	0–1	3:46 – Wedde (Hering)
Bakke (Varnes) – pp – 6:58	1–1
Lyngroth (Klakegg) – 18:19	2–1
	2–2	23:22 – pp – Rennhack (Schrader, Hering)
	2–3	27:56 – Hering (Wedde)
Oiseth (Bakke) – 32:01	3–3
Varnes (Oiseth) – 48:11	4–3

2 min
Penalties
14 min
14
Shots
23

== Pool C ==
2024 World Para Ice Hockey Championships Pool C
Tournament details
- Host country: Thailand
- Venue(s): Thailand International Ice Hockey Arena, Bangkok
- Dates: 26–30 November
- Teams: 4

Final positions
- Champions: Finland (1st title)
- Runners-up: Thailand
- Third place: Austria
- Fourth place: Australia

Tournament statistics
- Games played: 8
- Goals scored: 98 (12.25 per game)
- Attendance: 735 (92 per game)

Official website
- Bangkok 2024

Pool C was held organised in Bangkok, Thailand for the second consecutive time at the Thailand International Ice Hockey Arena. The group winners will be promoted to the 2025 Pool B. The winners were Finland, who were promoted to Pool B after defeating Thailand in the final.

=== Participants ===
Team	Qualification
Finland	Relegated from Pool B in 2023.
Austria	Placed 4th in Pool C in 2023.
Thailand	Host Placed 5th in Pool C in 2023.
Australia	Placed 3rd in Pool C in 2018.

=== Results ===
Pos	Team	Pld	W	OTW	OTL	L	GF	GA	GD	Pts	Qualification
1	Thailand (H)	3	3	0	0	0	40	0	+40	9	Gold medal match
2	Finland	3	2	0	0	1	32	3	+29	6	Gold medal match
3	Austria	3	1	0	0	2	16	22	−6	3	Bronze medal match
4	Australia	3	0	0	0	3	0	63	−63	0	Bronze medal match

Updated to match(es) played on unknown. Source: IPC
Rules for classification: 1) points; 2) head-to-head points; 3) head-to-head goal difference; 4) head-to-head number of goals scored; 5) goal difference.
(H) Host

All times are local.

26 November; 14:00	Thailand	25–0 (6–0, 9–0, 10–0)	Australia	Thailand International Ice Hockey Arena; Attendance: 58

Phanoot
Goalies
Peacock
Williams-Matsuoka
Referee:
Patrick Myers (CAN)
Linesmen:
Pavel Blazek (CZE)
Alexander West (ITA)

Sriwankham (Saennai) – 1:48	1–0
Yenkuan (Rinthong) – 2:25	2–0
Yenkuan (Rinthong) – 2:35	3–0
Saennai (Yisankun, Sriwankham) – 8:15	4–0
Saennai (Khemma, Sriwankham) – 11:38	5–0
Yenkuan (Rinthong, Suwannatrai) – 13:54	6–0
Rinthong (Yenkuan, Suwannatrai) – 17:15	7–0
Yisankun (Sriwankham, Khemma) – pp – 19:50	8–0
Saennai (Yenkuan) – 20:21	9–0
Khemma (Rinthong, Sriwankham) – 22:30	10–0
Sriwankham (Khemma, Yenkuan) – 25:38	11–0
Yisankun (Suwannatrai, Sriwankham) – 26:19	12–0
Saennai (Yenkuan, Yisankun) – 26:35	13–0
Baoarsa (Suwannatrai) – 27:33	14–0
Khemma (Sae-Lu) – 28:38	15–0
Yisankun (Yenkuan, Suwannatrai) – 33:27	16–0
Saennai (Yenkuan, Sae-Lu) – 34:57	17–0
Sae-Lu – 35:52	18–0
Saennai (Yenkuan, Yamarun) – 39:05	19–0
Yenkuan (Yamarun, Saennai) – 40:05	20–0
Yenkuan (Yamarun, Saennai) – 40:15	21–0
Yamarun (Saennai, Yenkuan) – 40:30	22–0
Sriwankham (Haisakulsuk) – sh – 41:28	23–0
Saennai (Sae-Lu) – sh – 42:00	24–0
Yenkuan (Baoarsa) – sh – 42:55	25–0

2 min
Penalties
4 min
62
Shots
2

26 November; 17:30	Finland	9–1 (4–1, 2–0, 3–0)	Austria	Thailand International Ice Hockey Arena; Attendance: 39

Karko
Goalies
Pouzar
Ladstaetter
Referee:
Jan Vanek (CZE)
Linesmen:
Marius Oswold Hermansen (NOR)
Aomsin Ubolluck (THA)

	0–1	2:58 – pp – Siess (Schilcher)
Pajula (Niskanen) – pp – 8:57	1–1
Himanen (Hanninen, Pajula) – 10:12	2–1
Hanninen (Vesikansa, Hirvela) – 11:11	3–1
Himanen (Pajula) – 12:56	4–1
Niskanen (Alestalo) – 18:15	5–1
Hanninen (Himanen) – pp – 19:18	6–1
Himanen – 32:11	7–1
Hanninen (Niskanen) – 32:38	8–1
Kangastie (Niskanen, Pajula) – 33:19	9–1

6 min
Penalties
10 min
25
Shots
5

27 November; 14:00	Austria	15–0 (5–0, 4–0, 6–0)	Australia	Thailand International Ice Hockey Arena; Attendance: 26

Pouzar
Ladstaetter
Goalies
Peacock
Williams-Matsuoka
Referee:
Chris Van Grinsen (NED)
Linesmen:
Pavel Blazek (CZE)
Aomsin Ubolluck (THA)

Schilcher (Ropp) – sh – 2:19	1–0
Habeler (Ropp, Schilcher) – sh – 4:00	2–0
Sauer – 4:10	3–0
Ropp (Schilcher) – 8:55	4–0
Habeler (Ropp, Huchler) – 13:28	5–0
Sauer (Huchler, Burtscher) – 16:48	6–0
Habeler (Sauer) – 20:55	7–0
Habeler (Siess, Ropp) – 24:30	8–0
Burtscher (Siess) – pp – 27:52	9–0
Habeler (Bilgeri, Ropp) – 36:06	10–0
Ropp (Sauer, Burtscher) – 36:57	11–0
Ropp (Burtscher, Bilgeri) – 37:55	12–0
Burtscher (Habeler) – 39:23	13–0
Sauer (Ropp) – 40:38	14–0
Ropp (Habeler) – 41:36	15–0

6 min
Penalties
4 min
52
Shots
0

27 November; 17:30	Finland	0–2 (0–0, 0–2, 0–0)	Thailand	Thailand International Ice Hockey Arena; Attendance: 116

Karko	Goalies	Aiamamphai; Phanoot	Referee: Patrick Myers (CAN); Linesmen: Marius Oswold Hermansen (NOR); Hamish Young (AUS)
0–1 / 18:44 – Suwannatrai (Khemma); 0–2 / 27:56 – Suwannatrai (Yenkuan, Sriwankham)			Referee: Patrick Myers (CAN); Linesmen: Marius Oswold Hermansen (NOR); Hamish Young (AUS)
8 min	Penalties	8 min	Referee: Patrick Myers (CAN); Linesmen: Marius Oswold Hermansen (NOR); Hamish Young (AUS)
6	Shots	21	Referee: Patrick Myers (CAN); Linesmen: Marius Oswold Hermansen (NOR); Hamish Young (AUS)

29 November; 14:00	Austria	0–13 (0–4, 0–4, 0–5)	Thailand	Thailand International Ice Hockey Arena; Attendance: 41

Pouzar
Ladstaetter
Goalies
Phanoot
Referee:
Jan Vanek (CZE)
Linesmen:
Alexander West (ITA)
Hamish Young (AUS)

0–1	5:37 – Sae-Lu
0–2	8:33 – ps – Saennai
0–3	9:17 – Sae-Lu (Khemma)
0–4	11:17 – Saennai (Sae-Lu)
0–5	21:48 – pp – Yenkuan (Khemma, Sae-Lu)
0–6	26:48 – Yenkuan (Baoarsa)
0–7	28:14 – Yenkuan (Khemma)
0–8	29:08 – Yenkuan (Khemma)
0–9	34:56 – sh – Saennai
0–10	35:41 – Saennai (Sriwankham)
0–11	40:56 – sh – Saennai (Yenkuan)
0–12	41:37 – sh – Khemma (Yenkuan)
0–13	42:13 – sh – Yenkuan (Khemma)

12 min
Penalties
14 min
3
Shots
32

29 November; 17:30	Finland	23–0 (11–0, 6–0, 6–0)	Australia	Thailand International Ice Hockey Arena; Attendance: 56

Karko
Rosendahl
Goalies
Williams-Matsuoka
Referee:
Chris Van Grinsen (NED)
Linesmen:
Marius Oswold Hermansen (NOR)
Aomsin Ubolluck (THA)

Pajula (Hanninen, Hirvela) – 1:25	1–0
Himanen (Hirvela) – 3:07	2–0
Pajula (Alestalo) – 3:23	3–0
Niskanen (Hanninen, Kangastie) – 3:36	4–0
Alestalo – 4:04	5–0
Himanen (Niskanen, Hanninen) – 4:44	6–0
Niskanen (Hirvela, Hanninen) – 5:32	7–0
Himanen (Alestalo) – 7:44	8–0
Niskanen (Hanninen, Pajula) – 9:16	9–0
Alestalo (Hanninen, Pajula) – 12:37	10–0
Alestalo (Vesikansa, Hirvela) – 14:13	11–0
Niskanen (Pajula) – 16:34	12–0
Hirvela (Alestalo, Vesikansa) – 17:20	13–0
Vesikansa (Himanen) – 20:08	14–0
Vesikansa (Himanen, Hanninen) – pp – 22:59	15–0
Pajula (Kangastie, Alestalo) – 25:28	16–0
Alestalo (Pajula, Hirvela) – 26:19	17–0
Hanninen (Niskanen, Hirvela) – 30:48	18–0
Himanen (Alestalo, Pakarinen) – 33:12	19–0
Niskanen (Himanen, Kangastie) – sh – 34:12	20–0
Alestalo (Pajula, Kangastie) – 35:38	21–0
Niskanen (Vesikansa) – 36:30	22–0
Pajula (Niskanen, Kangastie) – 41:33	23–0

4 min
Penalties
2 min
52
Shots
0

=== Knockout stage ===
==== Bronze medal match ====
30 November; 14:00	Austria	9–0 (2–0, 3–0, 4–0)	Australia	Thailand International Ice Hockey Arena; Attendance: 62

Ladstaetter
Goalies
Peacock
Referee:
Jan Vanek (CZE)
Linesmen:
Aomsin Ubolluck (THA)
Alexander West (ITA)

Habeler (Ropp) – pp – 2:46	1–0
Ropp (Burtscher) – pp – 9:13	2–0
Bilgeri (Sauer, Huchler) – 15:50	3–0
Habeler (Ropp) – 25:32	4–0
Burtscher (Habeler) – 28:28	5–0
Habeler (Burtscher) – 33:34	6–0
Sauer (Siess) – 34:42	7–0
Habeler (Burtscher) – 38:23	8–0
Burtscher (Habeler, Ropp) – pp – 44:24	9–0

4 min
Penalties
6 min
33
Shots
1

==== Gold medal match ====
30 November; 20:00	Thailand	0–1 (0–0, 0–0, 0–1)	Finland	Thailand International Ice Hockey Arena; Attendance: 355

Phanoot	Goalies	Karko	Referee: Patrick Myers (CAN); Linesmen: Pavel Blazek (CZE); Marius Oswold Hermansen (NOR)
0–1 / 30:11 – Hirvela			Referee: Patrick Myers (CAN); Linesmen: Pavel Blazek (CZE); Marius Oswold Hermansen (NOR)
17 min	Penalties	6 min	Referee: Patrick Myers (CAN); Linesmen: Pavel Blazek (CZE); Marius Oswold Hermansen (NOR)
10	Shots	10	Referee: Patrick Myers (CAN); Linesmen: Pavel Blazek (CZE); Marius Oswold Hermansen (NOR)

=== Final rankings ===
Promoted to 2025 Pool B

Rank	Team
Gold medal	Finland
Silver medal	Thailand
Bronze medal	Austria
4	Australia

== See also ==
- 2024 Women's World Challenge
