= Liu Wenxu =

Chinese ice sledge hockey player (born 2004)

Personal information
- Born: 13 December 2004 (age 21) Hebei, China

Sport
- Country: China
- Sport: Ice sled hockey
Medal record
Para ice hockey
Representing China
Paralympic Games
Bronze medal – third place	2026 Milano Cortina	Team competition

Liu Wenxu (born 13 December 2004) is a Chinese ice sled hockey player who is a member of the China national para ice hockey team. He represented China at the 2026 Winter Paralympics.

== Career ==
In February 2026, Liu was selected to represent China at the 2026 Winter Paralympics. During the bronze medal game against Czechia, China trailed 2–0 before scoring three unanswered goals to win their second consecutive bronze medal.
