= Brett Bolton =

American sledge hockey player (born 2006)

Personal information
- Born: April 8, 2006 (age 20) China
- Home town: Rockledge, Florida, U.S.

Sport
- Country: United States
- Sport: Ice sled hockey
- Position: Forward
Medal record
Para ice hockey
Representing the United States
Paralympic Games
Gold medal – first place	2026 Milano Cortina	Team competition
World Championships
Gold medal – first place	2023 Moose Jaw	Team competition
Silver medal – second place	2024 Calgary	Team competition

Brett Bolton (born April 8, 2006) is an American ice sled hockey player. He is a member of the United States national team that won a gold medal at the 2026 Winter Paralympics.

== Early life and education ==
Bolton was born in China as a congenital amputee, missing his left leg. He was adopted at three years old and raised in Rockledge, Florida, and attended Rockledge High School. He attends the University of Colorado and is majoring in finance and accounting major with a minor in leadership.

== Career ==
Bolton made his first United States national team roster in 2022 at 16 years old, competing at the 2022 International Para Hockey Cup.

He made his World Para Ice Hockey Championships debut for the United States at the 2023 World Para Ice Hockey Championships and won a gold medal. He again competed at the 2024 World Para Ice Hockey Championships and won a silver medal.

After not making the roster for the 2025 World Para Ice Hockey Championships, he competed at the 2025 Para Hockey Cup. During the semifinals against China he recorded his first career hat-trick to help the United States advance to the finals. During the championship game against Canada he scored the game-winning goal.

On January 16, 2026, he was named to Team USA's roster for the 2026 Winter Paralympics. He won a gold medal, Team USA's fifth consecutive gold medal in Para ice hockey at the Winter Paralympics.
