= Chen Hongyu (sledge hockey) =

Chinese ice sledge hockey player (born 2007)

Personal information
- Born: 19 March 2007 (age 19) Shandong, China

Sport
- Country: China
- Sport: Ice sled hockey
Medal record
Para ice hockey
Representing China
Paralympic Games
Bronze medal – third place	2026 Milano Cortina	Team competition

Chen Hongyu (Chinese: 陈泓宇; born 19 March 2007) is a Chinese ice sled hockey player who is a member of the China national para ice hockey team. He represented China at the 2026 Winter Paralympics.

== Career ==
In February 2026, Chen was selected to represent China at the 2026 Winter Paralympics. During the bronze medal game against Czechia, China trailed 2–0 before scoring three unanswered goals to win their second consecutive bronze medal.
