= Para ice hockey at the 2026 Winter Paralympics =

2026 Winter Paralympics

Tournament details
- Host country: Italy
- Venue: PalaItalia
- Dates: 7–15 March 2026
- Teams: 8

Final positions
- Champions: United States (6th title)
- Runners-up: Canada
- Third place: China
- Fourth place: Czech Republic

Tournament statistics
- Games played: 20
- Goals scored: 156 (7.8 per game)
- Attendance: 79,323 (3,966 per game)
- Scoring leader: (United States) Declan Farmer (26 points)

Awards
- MVP: (United States) Declan Farmer

The Para ice hockey competition of the 2026 Winter Paralympics was held at the PalaItalia in Milan, Italy from 7 to 15 March 2026. A total of eight teams competed in the mixed team tournament.

Akari Fukunishi from Japan has become the fourth female Para ice hockey player at the Paralympic Games.

== Medalists ==
Event	Gold	Silver	Bronze
Open tournament	United States; Kayden Beasley; Brett Bolton; Liam Cunningham; Travis Dodson; David Eustace; Declan Farmer; Noah Grove; Malik Jones; Griffin LaMarre; Jen Lee; Kevin McKee; Josh Misiewicz; Evan Nichols; Josh Pauls; Brody Roybal; Landon Uthke; Jack Wallace	Canada; Rob Armstrong; Vincent Boily; Shawn Burnett; Dominic Cozzolino; Adam Dixon; James Dunn; Auren Halbert; Tyrone Henry; Liam Hickey; Anton Jacobs-Webb; Adam Kingsmill; Micah Kovacevich; Zach Lavin; Mathieu Lelièvre; Tyler McGregor; Corbin Watson; Greg Westlake	China; Che Hang; Chen Hongyu; Cui Yutao; He Haoran; Ji Yanzhao; Li Hongguan; Liu Wenxu; Lyu Zhi; Qiu Dianpeng; Shen Yifeng; Song Xiaodong; Tian Jintao; Wang Jujiang; Wang Wei; Wang Zhidong; Zhang Zheng; Zhu Zhanfu

== Qualification ==
Qualifying event	Date	Venue	Vacancies	Qualified
Host nation	24 June 2019	(Switzerland) Lausanne	1	Italy
2025 World Championships	24–31 May 2025	(United States) Buffalo	5	Canada; China; Czechia; Germany; United States
Paralympic Qualification Tournament	5–10 November 2025	(Norway) Jessheim	2	Japan; Slovakia

== Preliminary round ==
All times are local (UTC+1).

=== Group A ===
Pos	Team	Pld	W	OTW	OTL	L	GF	GA	GD	Pts	Qualification
1	United States	3	3	0	0	0	34	2	+32	9	Semifinals
2	China	3	2	0	0	1	24	8	+16	6	Semifinals
3	Italy (H)	3	1	0	0	2	4	26	−22	3	5–8th place semifinals
4	Germany	3	0	0	0	3	1	27	−26	0	5–8th place semifinals

Source: Milano Cortina 2026
(H) Host

7 March 2026; 13:35	China	12–0 (5–0, 3–0, 4–0)	Germany	PalaItalia, Milan; Attendance: 2,787

Game reference

Ji Yanzhao
Goalies
Simon Kunst
Referee:
(Canada) Matthew Fergenbaum
Linesmen:
(United States) Brendan Lewis
(Italy) Alexander Wiest

Wang Z. (Shen, Zhu) – 06:16	1–0
Wang Z. (Shen, Lyu) – 08:44	2–0
Qiu (Wang Z., Zhu) (PP) – 12:42	3–0
Tian (Wang J.) – 12:54	4–0
Tian (Li, Lyu) – 14:32	5–0
Qiu (Shen, Wang Z.) – 20:34	6–0
Qiu (PP) – 28:34	7–0
Chen (Lyu, Wang J.) – 29:39	8–0
Tian (Song) – 32:56	9–0
Liu (Shen, Zhu) – 33:30	10–0
Liu (Zhu, Li) – 34:46	11–0
Li (Song, Lyu) – 35:40	12–0

6 min
Penalties
6 min
36
Shots
5

7 March 2026; 17:05	United States	14–1 (3–1, 7–0, 4–0)	Italy	PalaItalia, Milan; Attendance: 8,992

Game reference

Jen Lee
Goalies
Julian Kasslatter
Santino Stillitano
Referee:
(Canada) Patrick Myers
Linesmen:
(Norway) Marius Hermansen Oswold
(Sweden) Andreas Lunden

	0–1	00:25 – Depaoli (Rosa)
Eustace (Dodson) – 03:46	1–1
Bolton (Farmer, Pauls) – 09:00	2–1
Farmer (Grove, Beasley) – 11:18	3–1
Bolton (Pauls, Grove) – 16:39	4–1
McKee (Roybal, Wallace) – 17:54	5–1
Farmer (Pauls) – 18:29	6–1
Beasley (Farmer) – 18:57	7–1
Grove (Nichols, Roybal) – 20:18	8–1
Farmer (Eustace) – 22:25	9–1
Farmer (Pauls) – 23:16	10–1
Jones (Grove, Roybal) – 33:40	11–1
Nichols (Roybal, Grove) – 34:12	12–1
Wallace (Dodson, Cunningham) – 35:44	13–1
Eustace (Grove, Dodson) – 42:46	14–1

2 min
Penalties
4 min
53
Shots
2

9 March 2026; 10:05	China	11–1 (1–1, 6–0, 4–0)	Italy	PalaItalia, Milan; Attendance: 4,500

Game reference

Wang Wei
Goalies
Santino Stillitano
Julian Kasslatter
Referee:
(United States) Bobby Esposito
Linesmen:
(Czech Republic) Pavel Blažek
(Finland) Lari Niittylä

Tian (Lyu, Song) – 12:22	1–0
	1–1	13:07 – Landeros (Kalegaris, Kafmann)
Qiu (Shen, Zhu) – 19:09	2–1
Wang Z. (Li) – 19:55	3–1
Tian (Shen) – 21:01	4–1
Tian (Shen) – 23:10	5–1
Wang Z. (Lyu, Song) – 24:08	6–1
Shen (Tian) – 26:02	7–1
Wang J. (Wang Z.) (PP) – 31:46	8–1
Song (Che) – 33:15	9–1
Wang Z. (Shen, Tian) – 34:47	10–1
Li (Shen, Song) (PP) – 44:27	11–1

4 min
Penalties
6 min
39
Shots
8

9 March 2026; 17:05	Germany	0–13 (0–6, 0–5, 0–2)	United States	PalaItalia, Milan; Attendance: 1,284

Game reference

Veit Mühlhans
Goalies
Griffin LaMarre
Referee:
(Canada) Matthew Fergenbaum
Linesmen:
(Sweden) Tony Rundström
(Italy) Alexander Wiest

0–1	00:58 – Farmer (Roybal)
0–2	02:52 – Farmer (Jones, Grove)
0–3	06:31 – Farmer (Pauls, Grove)
0–4	07:02 – Eustace (Dodson, Wallace)
0–5	09:44 – Eustace (Wallace, Utkhe) (PP)
0–6	14:32 – Beasley (Jones, Nichols)
0–7	18:10 – Bolton (Farmer, Wallace)
0–8	18:29 – Wallace (Farmer, Utkhe)
0–9	19:21 – Eustace
0–10	21:20 – Farmer (Roybal, Bolton)
0–11	21:42 – Bolton (Farmer, Wallace)
0–12	32:44 – Beasley (Nichols)
0–13	38:10 – Wallace

2 min
Penalties
2 min
1
Shots
41

10 March 2026; 10:05	Italy	2–1 (1–1, 1–0, 0–0)	Germany	PalaItalia, Milan; Attendance: 4,873

Game reference

Julian Kasslatter
Goalies
Simon Kunst
Referee:
(Czech Republic) Jan Vaněk
Linesmen:
(Czech Republic) Pavel Blažek
(Italy) Alexander Wiest

	0–1	02:40 – Bußmann (Kuhli-Lauenstein, Stumpe)
Larch (Rosa, Landeros) (PP) – 11:55	1–1
Landeros (Kalegaris, Macri) – 18:31	2–1

4 min
Penalties
8 min
24
Shots
12

10 March 2026; 13:35	United States	7–1 (2–0, 4–0, 1–1)	China	PalaItalia, Milan; Attendance: 2,660

Game reference

Jen Lee
Goalies
Ji Yanzhao
Wang Wei
Referee:
(Canada) Kevin Webinger
Linesmen:
(Canada) Dylan Dauphinee
(United States) Brendan Lewis

Pauls (Roybal, Wallace) (PP) – 11:46	1–0
Farmer (Roybal) (PP) – 14:38	2–0
Roybal (Nichols) (PP) – 17:22	3–0
Farmer (Wallace) – 20:24	4–0
Roybal (Farmer, Nichols) (PP) – 26:16	5–0
Cunningham (Grove, Farmer) (PP) – 28:38	6–0
Farmer – 30:59	7–0
	7–1	34:28 – Zhu (Tian, Wang Z.)

6 min
Penalties
18 min
31
Shots
9

=== Group B ===
Pos	Team	Pld	W	OTW	OTL	L	GF	GA	GD	Pts	Qualification
1	Canada	3	3	0	0	0	26	1	+25	9	Semifinals
2	Czechia	3	2	0	0	1	12	7	+5	6	Semifinals
3	Slovakia	3	1	0	0	2	6	17	−11	3	5–8th place semifinals
4	Japan	3	0	0	0	3	3	22	−19	0	5–8th place semifinals

Source: Milano Cortina 2026

7 March 2026; 10:05	Czechia	3–2 (2–1, 1–1, 0–0)	Japan	PalaItalia, Milan; Attendance: 2,083

Game reference

Patrik Sedláček
Goalies
Wataru Horie
Referee:
(United States) Bobby Esposito
Linesmen:
(Canada) Dylan Dauphinee
(Serbia) Tibor Fazekas

	0–1	06:14 – Niitsu (Ukai, Ito)
Zelinka (Hábl) – 08:54	1–1
Geier (Zelinka, Veselý) – 11:04	2–1
	2–2	20:09 – Ito (Matsushita)
Kapko (Geier) (PP) – 23:37	3–2

8 min
Penalties
10 min
30
Shots
4

7 March 2026; 20:35	Canada	8–0 (4–0, 1–0, 3–0)	Slovakia	PalaItalia, Milan; Attendance: 4,438

Game reference

Corbin Watson
Goalies
Eduard Lepáček
Referee:
(Canada) Kevin Webinger
Linesmen:
(Czech Republic) Pavel Blažek
(Sweden) Tony Rundström

Dunn (Cozzolino, Boily) – 06:46	1–0
Halbert – 09:20	2–0
McGregor (Hickey, Jacobs-Webb) – 10:11	3–0
Boily (Lavin) – 11:42	4–0
Hickey (McGregor) – 20:29	5–0
Dunn – 35:06	6–0
Boily (Armstrong, Dunn) – 38:55	7–0
Cozzolino (Hickey) (PP) – 42:31	8–0

2 min
Penalties
4 min
51
Shots
2

9 March 2026; 13:35	Czechia	8–1 (2–0, 4–0, 2–1)	Slovakia	PalaItalia, Milan; Attendance: 2,285

Game reference

Martin Kudela
Goalies
Eduard Lepáček
Referee:
(Canada) Patrick Myers
Linesmen:
(Norway) Marius Hermansen Oswold
(Sweden) Andreas Lunden

Veselý – 04:50	1–0
Žižlavský (Ohar) – 12:40	2–0
Žižlavský (Doležal, Zelinka) – 16:10	3–0
Veselý (Hečko, Žižlavský) – 20:05	4–0
Zelinka (Hečko, Veselý) – 23:15	5–0
Doležal (Veselý) – 26:39	6–0
	6–1	32:43 – Korman (Joppa, Ferenčík)
Zelinka (Pátek) – 35:59	7–1
Geier – 36:10	8–1

4 min
Penalties
4 min
30
Shots
9

9 March 2026; 20:35	Japan	0–14 (0–6, 0–3, 0–5)	Canada	PalaItalia, Milan; Attendance: 3,040

Game reference

Wataru Horie
Goalies
Adam Kingsmill
Referee:
(Czech Republic) Jan Vaněk
Linesmen:
(Serbia) Tibor Fazekas
(United States) Brendan Lewis

0–1	00:39 – McGregor (Jacobs-Webb, Halbert)
0–2	03:45 – McGregor (Jacobs-Webb, Lavin)
0–3	07:25 – Cozzolino (Armstrong)
0–4	11:46 – Cozzolino (Boily)
0–5	12:21 – Halbert (Jacobs-Webb, McGregor)
0–6	13:53 – Dixon (Hickey, McGregor) (PP)
0–7	23:44 – Boily (Halbert, Armstrong) (PP)
0–8	24:30 – Halbert (Lelièvre)
0–9	29:53 – Cozzolino (Hickey)
0–10	35:44 – Dunn (Boily, Cozzolino)
0–11	37:12 – Hickey (McGregor, Halbert)
0–12	39:44 – Halbert (Jacobs-Webb)
0–13	40:57 – Dunn (Boily, Armstrong)
0–14	42:45 – Halbert (Lelièvre)

12 min
Penalties
2 min
2
Shots
56

10 March 2026; 17:05	Canada	4–1 (0–0, 2–1, 2–0)	Czechia	PalaItalia, Milan; Attendance: 1,361

Game reference

Corbin Watson
Goalies
Patrik Sedláček
Referee:
(United States) Bobby Esposito
Linesmen:
(Norway) Marius Hermansen Oswold
(Sweden) Tony Rundström

Dunn (McGregor, Dixon) (PP) – 19:46	1–0
Boily (Jacobs-Webb) (PP) – 27:35	2–0
McGregor (Hickey, Cozzolino) (PP) – 31:57	3–0
	3–1	33:48 – Hábl (Doležal, Zelinka) (PP)
Hickey (McGregor) (EN) – 44:50	4–1

12 min
Penalties
12 min
26
Shots
12

10 March 2026; 20:35	Slovakia	5–1 (0–1, 2–0, 3–0)	Japan	PalaItalia, Milan; Attendance: 2,223

Game reference

Eduard Lepáček
Goalies
Wataru Horie
Referee:
(Canada) Matthew Fergenbaum
Linesmen:
(Serbia) Tibor Fazekas
(Finland) Lari Niittylä

	0–1	05:21 – Ito (Niitsu, Ukai)
Joppa (Ligda) – 24:04	1–1
Korman (Joppa, Ferenčík) – 29:19	2–1
Joppa (Korman) – 40:45	3–1
Hlinka (Joppa, Korman) – 41:19	4–1
Večerek (Turic) – 44:41	5–1

2 min
Penalties
0 min
29
Shots
10

== Classification round ==
=== Bracket ===
5–8th place semifinals
12 March
Italy	5
Japan	0
12 March
Slovakia	3
Germany (OT)	4

Fifth place game
14 March
Italy	5
Germany	2
Seventh place game
14 March
Slovakia	1
Japan	0

=== 5–8th place semifinals ===
12 March 2026; 14:35	Slovakia	3–4 OT (1–2, 2–0, 0–1) (OT: 0–1)	Germany	PalaItalia, Milan; Attendance: 3,376

Game reference

Eduard Lepáček
Goalies
Veit Mühlhans
Referee:
(Czech Republic) Jan Vaněk
Linesmen:
(United States) Brendan Lewis
(Italy) Alexander Wiest

	0–1	01:20 – Schrader (Stumpe)
	0–2	08:07 – Schrader
Ferenčík (Joppa, Ligda) – 12:02	1–2
Večerek – 15:38	2–2
Joppa (Korman, Ligda) – 28:56	3–2
	3–3	41:11 – Schrader (Brelage, Disveld)
	3–4	51:04 – Schrader

0 min
Penalties
18 min
25
Shots
14

12 March 2026; 19:05	Italy	5–0 (1–0, 3–0, 1–0)	Japan	PalaItalia, Milan; Attendance: 3,634

Game reference

Santino Stillitano
Goalies
Wataru Horie
Referee:
(Canada) Kevin Webinger
Linesmen:
(Czech Republic) Pavel Blažek
(Finland) Lari Niittylä

Landeros (Larch, Rosa) (PP) – 06:32	1–0
Landeros (Macri, Larch) – 19:37	2–0
Radice (Rosa) – 26:28	3–0
Kalegaris (Depaoli) – 28:01	4–0
Landeros (Torella) – 44:33	5–0

6 min
Penalties
10 min
29
Shots
13

=== Seventh place game ===
14 March 2026; 12:05	Slovakia	1–0 (0–0, 0–0, 1–0)	Japan	PalaItalia, Milan; Attendance: 2,916

Game reference
Eduard Lepáček	Goalies	Wataru Horie	Referee: (United States) Bobby Esposito; Linesmen: (Czech Republic) Pavel Blažek (Finland) Lari Niittylä
Joppa – 43:29 / 1–0			Referee: (United States) Bobby Esposito; Linesmen: (Czech Republic) Pavel Blažek (Finland) Lari Niittylä
6 min	Penalties	6 min	Referee: (United States) Bobby Esposito; Linesmen: (Czech Republic) Pavel Blažek (Finland) Lari Niittylä
19	Shots	8	Referee: (United States) Bobby Esposito; Linesmen: (Czech Republic) Pavel Blažek (Finland) Lari Niittylä

=== Fifth place game ===
14 March 2026; 16:05	Italy	5–2 (0–1, 2–1, 3–0)	Germany	PalaItalia, Milan; Attendance: 6,495

Game reference

Santino Stillitano
Goalies
Simon Kunst
Referee:
(Canada) Matthew Fergenbaum
Linesmen:
(Serbia) Tibor Fazekas
(Norway) Marius Hermansen Oswold

	0–1	09:09 – Hering (Schrader, Rädler) (PP)
Landeros (Enderle, Rosa) – 17:54	1–1
	1–2	21:08 – Hering
Depaoli (Rosa) (PP) – 26:56	2–2
Landeros (Depaoli, Rosa) – 37:05	3–2
Rosa (Macri, Kalegaris) – 38:05	4–2
Rosa (Larch, Macri) – 42:53	5–2

18 min
Penalties
24 min
25
Shots
11

== Medal round ==
=== Bracket ===
Semifinals
13 March
United States	6
Czechia	1
13 March
Canada	4
China	2

Gold medal game
15 March
United States	6
Canada	2
Bronze medal game
15 March
China	3
Czechia	2

=== Semifinals ===
13 March 2026; 14:35	United States	6–1 (1–1, 2–0, 3–0)	Czechia	PalaItalia, Milan; Attendance: 3,016

Game reference

Griffin LaMarre
Goalies
Patrik Sedláček
Referee:
(Canada) Matthew Fergenbaum
Linesmen:
(Canada) Dylan Dauphinee
(Sweden) Andreas Lunden

	0–1	05:08 – Geier (Kubeš, Kapko) (PP)
Farmer (Dodson, Eustace) – 10:26	1–1
Eustace (Farmer) – 19:59	2–1
Farmer (Eustace, Dodson) – 20:18	3–1
Pauls (Farmer, Grove) – 35:19	4–1
Farmer (Roybal, Pauls) – 37:52	5–1
Grove (Roybal, Farmer) (PP) – 38:49	6–1

4 min
Penalties
8 min
41
Shots
5

13 March 2026; 19:05	Canada	4–2 (2–1, 0–1, 2–0)	China	PalaItalia, Milan; Attendance: 3,898

Game reference

Corbin Watson
Goalies
Wang Wei
Referee:
(Canada) Patrick Myers
Linesmen:
(Norway) Marius Hermansen Oswold
(Sweden) Tony Rundström

McGregor (Hickey, Cozzolino) (PP) – 06:05	1–0
McGregor (Hickey, Lelièvre) – 10:43	2–0
	2–1	14:36 – Zhang (Shen, Tian) (PP)
	2–2	15:55 – Tian (Wang Z., Shen) (PP)
Cozzolino (Lavin) – 38:53	3–2
Hickey (Jacobs-Webb, McGregor) – 40:48	4–2

8 min
Penalties
10 min
21
Shots
11

=== Bronze medal game ===
15 March 2026; 12:05	China	3–2 (2–2, 0–0, 1–0)	Czechia	PalaItalia, Milan; Attendance: 3,962

Game reference

Ji Yanzhao
Goalies
Patrik Sedláček
Referee:
(Canada) Patrick Myers
Linesmen:
(United States) Brendan Lewis
(Sweden) Andreas Lunden

	0–1	01:40 – Kubeš (Geier, Kapko)
	0–2	02:34 – Zelinka (Žižlavský, Doležal)
Tian (Shen) – 06:03	1–2
Wang Z. (Zhu, Zhang) – 08:05	2–2
Tian (Shen) – 30:18	3–2

8 min
Penalties
2 min
23
Shots
16

=== Gold medal game ===
15 March 2026; 16:05	United States	6–2 (1–0, 2–1, 3–1)	Canada	PalaItalia, Milan; Attendance: 11,500

Game reference

Griffin LaMarre
Goalies
Corbin Watson
Referee:
(Canada) Kevin Webinger
Linesmen:
(Canada) Dylan Dauphinee
(Sweden) Tony Rundström

Wallace (PP) – 08:39	1–0
	1–1	16:45 – Hickey (McGregor, Cozzolino) (PP)
Beasley – 21:29	2–1
Wallace (Farmer) – 24:52	3–1
Wallace (Pauls) – 31:42	4–1
	4–2	32:06 – Hickey
Farmer (Wallace) (SH) – 41:20	5–2
Roybal (SH, EN) – 41:29	6–2

6 min
Penalties
8 min
26
Shots
15

== Final ranking ==
Pos	Grp	Team	Pld	W	OTW	OTL	L	GF	GA	GD	Pts
1st place, gold medalist(s)	A	United States	5	5	0	0	0	46	5	+41	15
2nd place, silver medalist(s)	B	Canada	5	4	0	0	1	32	9	+23	12
3rd place, bronze medalist(s)	A	China	5	3	0	0	2	29	14	+15	9
4	B	Czechia	5	2	0	0	3	15	16	−1	6
5	A	Italy (H)	5	3	0	0	2	14	28	−14	9
6	A	Germany	5	0	1	0	4	7	35	−28	2
7	B	Slovakia	5	2	0	1	2	10	21	−11	7
8	B	Japan	5	0	0	0	5	3	28	−25	0

Source: Milano Cortina 2026
(H) Host

== Statistics ==
=== Scoring leaders ===
List shows the top ten skaters sorted by points, then goals.

Player	GP	G	A	Pts	+/−	PIM	POS
(United States) Declan Farmer	5	15	11	26	+26	4	F
(Canada) Tyler McGregor	5	6	8	14	+8	2	F
(United States) Jack Wallace	5	6	8	14	+15	4	D
(China) Shen Yifeng	5	1	13	14	+8	2	F
(China) Tian Jintao	5	9	4	13	+11	8	F
(Canada) Liam Hickey	5	6	7	13	+10	0	F
(United States) Brody Roybal	5	3	10	13	+16	2	F
(China) Wang Zhidong	5	6	5	11	+6	4	F
(United States) Noah Grove	5	2	9	11	+22	0	D
(Canada) Dominic Cozzolino	5	5	5	10	+7	0	F

GP = Games played; G = Goals; A = Assists; Pts = Points; +/− = Plus/minus; PIM = Penalties in minutes; POS = Position
Source: Milano Cortina 2026

=== Leading goaltenders ===
Only the top five goaltenders, based on save percentage, who have played at least 40% of their team's minutes, are included in this list.

Player	TOI	GA	GAA	SA	Sv%	SO
(United States) Griffin LaMarre	135:00	3	1.00	21	85.71	1
(Czech Republic) Patrik Sedláček	178:30	14	3.53	93	84.95	0
(Canada) Corbin Watson	179:58	8	2.00	50	84.00	1
(China) Wang Wei	105:00	6	2.57	36	83.33	0
(Japan) Wataru Horie	225:00	28	5.60	163	82.82	0

TOI = Time on ice (minutes:seconds); GA = Goals against; GAA = Goals against average; SA = Shots against; Sv% = Save percentage; SO = Shutouts
Source: Milano Cortina 2026

== Awards ==
Best players selected by the Directorate

Position	Player
Goaltender	(Czech Republic) Patrik Sedláček
Defenceman	(United States) Jack Wallace
Forward	(United States) Declan Farmer

All-Star team

Position	Player
Goaltender	(Italy) Santino Stillitano
Defenceman	(Czech Republic) Radek Zelinka
Defenceman	(United States) Josh Pauls
Forward	(Canada) Dominic Cozzolino
Forward	(United States) Declan Farmer
Forward	(China) Tian Jintao
MVP	(United States) Declan Farmer
