= Mathieu Lelièvre =

Canadian ice sledge hockey player (born 2005)

Personal information
- Full name: Mathieu Lelièvre
- Born: June 13, 2005 (age 21)
- Home town: Lévis, Quebec, Canada

Sport
- Country: Canada
- Sport: Ice sled hockey
- Position: Defense
Medal record
Para ice hockey
Representing Canada
Paralympic Games
Silver medal – second place	2026 Milano Cortina	Team competition
World Championships
Gold medal – first place	2024 Calgary	Team competition
Silver medal – second place	2025 Buffalo	Team competition

Mathieu Lelièvre (born June 13, 2005) is a Canadian ice sled hockey player who was a member of the Canada national para ice hockey team that competed at the 2026 Winter Paralympics.

== Career ==
Lelièvre made his World Para Ice Hockey Championships debut for Canada at the 2024 World Para Ice Hockey Championships, and won a gold medal, however he didn't see any playing time. He again competed at the 2025 World Para Ice Hockey Championships, and won a silver medal.

On January 20, 2026, he was selected to represent Canada at the 2026 Winter Paralympics. He won a silver medal, Canada's third consecutive silver medal in Para ice hockey at the Winter Paralympics.

== Personal life ==
Lelièvre lost his left leg due to cancer at a young age, and is an above-knee amputee.
