= Wang Jujiang =

Chinese ice sledge hockey player (born 1996)

Personal information
- Born: 15 July 1994 (age 32) Shandong, China

Sport
- Country: China
- Sport: Ice sled hockey
Medal record
Para ice hockey
Representing China
Paralympic Games
| Bronze medal – third place | 2022 Beijing | Team competition |
| Bronze medal – third place | 2026 Milano Cortina | Team competition |

Wang Jujiang (Chinese: 王聚江; born 15 July 1996) is a Chinese ice sled hockey player who is a member of the China national para ice hockey team. He represented China at the 2022 and 2026 Winter Paralympics.

== Career ==
Wang represented China at the 2022 Winter Paralympics and won a bronze medal. This was China's first international medal only five years after starting a para ice hockey program. In February 2026, he was again selected to represent China at the 2026 Winter Paralympics. During the bronze medal game against Czechia, China trailed 2–0 before scoring three unanswered goals to win their second consecutive bronze medal.
