= Liam Cunningham (sledge hockey) =

American sledge hockey player (born 2008)

Personal information
- Born: March 5, 2008 (age 18) River Falls, Wisconsin, U.S.

Sport
- Country: United States
- Sport: Ice sled hockey
- Position: Defense
Medal record
Para ice hockey
Representing United States
Paralympic Games
Gold medal – first place	2026 Milano Cortina	Team competition
World Championships
Gold medal – first place	2025 Buffalo	Team competition

Liam Cunningham (born March 5, 2008) is an American ice sled hockey player. He was a member of the United States national team that won a gold medal at the 2026 Winter Paralympics.

== Early life and education ==
Cunningham grew up in a hockey family and began playing sled hockey at age seven, after being diagnosed with a degenerative bone disorder in his legs. He attends Saint Thomas Academy, a military high school in Mendota Heights, Minnesota.

== Career ==
Cunningham made his first United States national team roster in 2023 at 15 years old, and made his international debut at the 2023 International Para Hockey Cup.

He made his World Para Ice Hockey Championships debut for the United States at 2025 World Para Ice Hockey Championships and won a gold medal. At 17 years old, he was the youngest member on the roster.

On January 2, 2026, he was named to Team USA's roster for the 2026 Winter Paralympics. He won a gold medal, Team USA's fifth consecutive gold medal in Para ice hockey at the Winter Paralympics.
