= 2025 Para Ice Hockey Paralympic Qualification Tournament =

Paralympic qualifier

Tournament details
- Host country: Norway
- City: Jessheim
- Venue: 1 (in 1 host city)
- Dates: 5–10 November
- Format: Round Robin
- Teams: 6

Final positions
- Champions: Japan
- Runners-up: Slovakia
- Third place: Norway
- Fourth place: South Korea

Tournament statistics
- Games played: 15
- Goals scored: 77 (5.13 per game)
- Attendance: 1,287 (86 per game)
- Scoring leader: (Slovakia) Martin Joppa (14 points)

Awards
- MVP: (Slovakia) Martin Joppa

Official website
- Jessheim 2025

The 2025 Para Ice Hockey Paralympic Qualification Tournament was the final qualification tournament for the 2026 Winter Paralympics in Milan and Cortina d'Ampezzo. Held between 5 and 10 November 2025, the qualifier was played in Norwegian town of Jessheim, at the Jessheim Is- og Flerbrukshall. Six teams, from pools A and B of the world championships, took part. The top two teams in the qualifier secured the last two spots in the Paralympics.

Japan won the tournament and along with Slovakia, qualified for the 2026 Winter Paralympics.

Japan's Itsuki Ito was named best forward, and Wataru Horie was announced as the best goalkeeper in the tournament.

== Host selection ==
On 8 July 2025, Jessheim, Norway was awarded the hosting rights. Regarding the hosting announcement, Espen Hegde, president of the local organising committee said:

“The Norwegian Ice Hockey Association and the city of Jessheim are honoured and grateful to be hosting the Paralympic Qualification Tournament. The table is set for a very exciting event, and we look forward to welcoming all teams and participants.”

Michelle Laflamme, World Para Ice Hockey manager, proclaimed:

“The Paralympic Winter Games Qualification Tournament is bound to bring out some of the best action we have ever seen in our sport, as teams play for last chance spots to for the Milano Cortina 2026 Games. We are thrilled to have Norway – a hockey hotbed and one of the original nations of our sport – host this crucial event in what is turning into our most competitive Paralympic cycle yet.”

== Format ==
The six teams will play each other in a round robin format. The top two teams will qualify for the 2026 Winter Paralympics.

== Venue ==
The venue was the Jessheim Is- og Flerbrukshall in Jessheim. The venue was built in 2014 and also hosts numerous other sports.

2025 Para Ice Hockey Paralympic Qualification Tournament is located in Norway	Jessheim
2025 Para Ice Hockey Paralympic Qualification Tournament is located in Norway	Jessheim Is- og Flerbrukshall
2025 Para Ice Hockey Paralympic Qualification Tournament is located in Norway	Capacity: 240 seats

== Teams ==
The bottom three from the Pool A and the top three from the Pool B advanced to this qualifier. Paralympic hosts and Pool B winners, Italy, had the choice to take part for preparation reasons, but declined. Their spot was taken by Kazakhstan, who finished fourth in Pool B.

Team	Qualification	Ref
Slovakia	Placed 6th in Pool A in 2025.	
South Korea	Placed 7th in Pool A in 2025.	
Norway (H)	Placed 8th in Pool A in 2025.	
Japan	Placed 2nd in Pool B in 2025.	
Sweden	Placed 3rd in Pool B in 2025.	
Kazakhstan	Placed 4th in Pool B in 2025.	

== Results ==
Pos	Team	Pld	W	OTW	OTL	L	GF	GA	GD	Pts	Qualification
1	Japan	5	4	0	0	1	19	6	+13	12 (Note: Slovakia 2–3 Japan)	2026 Winter Paralympics
2	Slovakia	5	4	0	0	1	15	6	+9	12	2026 Winter Paralympics
3	Norway (H)	5	3	0	0	2	17	13	+4	9 (Note: South Korea 0–2 Norway)	
4	South Korea	5	3	0	0	2	14	7	+7	9	
5	Sweden	5	1	0	0	4	8	20	−12	3	
6	Kazakhstan	5	0	0	0	5	4	25	−21	0	

Source: Jessheim 2025
(H) Host
Notes:

All times are local (UTC+1).

5 November 2025; 12:00	Japan	1–2 (1–0, 0–0, 0–2)	South Korea	Jessheim Is- og Flerbrukshall, Jessheim; Attendance: 34

Game reference

Referee:
Bobby Esposito (USA)
Linesmen:
Przemek Iwaniec (POL)
Tony Rundstrom (SWE)

1–0
1–1
1–2

6 min
Penalties
2 min
10
Shots
23

5 November 2025; 15:30	Kazakhstan	0–6 (0–3, 0–1, 0–2)	Slovakia	Jessheim Is- og Flerbrukshall, Jessheim; Attendance: 31

Game reference

Referee:
Jan Vanek (CZE)
Linesmen:
Tibor Fazekas (SRB)
Andreas Lunden (SWE)

0–1
0–2
0–3
0–4
0–5
0–6

2 min
Penalties
10 min
15
Shots
12

5 November 2025; 19:00	Sweden	1–8 (0–3, 1–1, 0–4)	Norway	Jessheim Is- og Flerbrukshall, Jessheim; Attendance: 104

Game reference

Referee:
Jan Vanek (CZE)
Linesmen:
Pavel Blazek (CZE)
Andreas Lunden (SWE)

0–1
0–2
0–3
0–4
1–4
1–5
1–6
1–7
1–8

6 min
Penalties
10 min
10
Shots
25

6 November 2025; 12:00	Slovakia	2–3 (0–0, 0–1, 2–2)	Japan	Jessheim Is- og Flerbrukshall, Jessheim; Attendance: 25

Game reference

Referee:
Jan Vanek (CZE)
Linesmen:
Pavel Blazek (CZE)
Andreas Lunden (SWE)

0–1
1–1
2–1
2–2
2–3

2 min
Penalties
6 min
20
Shots
11

6 November 2025; 15:30	South Korea	4–2 (2–1, 0–0, 2–1)	Sweden	Jessheim Is- og Flerbrukshall, Jessheim; Attendance: 31

Game reference

Referee:
Bobby Esposito (USA)
Linesmen:
Marius Oswold Hermansen (NOR)
Przemek Iwaniec (POL)

1–0
1–1
2–1
3–1
4–1
4–2

8 min
Penalties
8 min
22
Shots
16

6 November 2025; 19:00	Norway	4–1 (1–0, 1–1, 2–0)	Kazakhstan	Jessheim Is- og Flerbrukshall, Jessheim; Attendance: 149

Game reference

Referee:
Matt Fergenbaum (CAN)
Linesmen:
Tibor Fazekas (SRB)
Tony Rundstrom (SWE)

1–0
1–1
2–1
3–1
4–1

6 min
Penalties
4 min
22
Shots
4

7 November 2025; 12:00	Slovakia	2–1 (1–0, 0–1, 1–0)	Sweden	Jessheim Is- og Flerbrukshall, Jessheim; Attendance: 23

Game reference

Referee:
Matt Fergenbaum (CAN)
Linesmen:
Tibor Fazekas (SRB)
Przemek Iwaniec (POL)

1–0
1–1
2–1

4 min
Penalties
0 min
21
Shots
11

7 November 2025; 15:30	Kazakhstan	0–4 (0–1, 0–1, 0–2)	Japan	Jessheim Is- og Flerbrukshall, Jessheim; Attendance: 24

Game reference

Referee:
Kevin Webinger (CAN)
Linesmen:
Marius Oswold Hermansen (NOR)
Tony Rundstrom (SWE)

0–1
0–2
0–3
0–4

26 min
Penalties
8 min
8
Shots
22

7 November 2025; 19:00	South Korea	0–2 (0–2, 0–0, 0–0)	Norway	Jessheim Is- og Flerbrukshall, Jessheim; Attendance: 203

Game reference
			Referee: Jan Vanek (CZE); Linesmen: Pavel Blazek (CZE); Andreas Lunden (SWE)
0–1; 0–2			Referee: Jan Vanek (CZE); Linesmen: Pavel Blazek (CZE); Andreas Lunden (SWE)
12 min	Penalties	12 min	Referee: Jan Vanek (CZE); Linesmen: Pavel Blazek (CZE); Andreas Lunden (SWE)
6	Shots	11	Referee: Jan Vanek (CZE); Linesmen: Pavel Blazek (CZE); Andreas Lunden (SWE)

9 November 2025; 12:00	South Korea	7–0 (4–0, 1–0, 2–0)	Kazakhstan	Jessheim Is- og Flerbrukshall, Jessheim; Attendance: 26

Game reference

Referee:
Matt Fergenbaum (CAN)
Linesmen:
Marius Oswold Hermansen (NOR)
Andreas Lunden (SWE)

1–0
2–0
3–0
4–0
5–0
6–0
7–0

6 min
Penalties
33 min
25
Shots
7

9 November 2025; 15:30	Japan	3–0 (1–0, 1–0, 1–0)	Sweden	Jessheim Is- og Flerbrukshall, Jessheim; Attendance: 31

Game reference

Referee:
Kevin Webinger (CAN)
Linesmen:
Pavel Blazek (CZE)
Tibor Fazekas (SRB)

1–0
2–0
3–0

12 min
Penalties
10 min
10
Shots
18

9 November 2025; 19:00	Norway	1–3 (0–0, 1–2, 0–1)	Slovakia	Jessheim Is- og Flerbrukshall, Jessheim; Attendance: 282

Game reference

Referee:
Bobby Esposito (USA)
Linesmen:
Przemek Iwaniec (POL)
Tony Rundstrom (SWE)

0–1
1–1
1–2
1–3

6 min
Penalties
8 min
18
Shots
11

10 November 2025; 12:00	Sweden	4–3 (3–0, 0–2, 1–1)	Kazakhstan	Jessheim Is- og Flerbrukshall, Jessheim; Attendance: 31

Game reference

Referee:
Matt Fergenbaum (CAN)
Linesmen:
Przemek Iwaniec (POL)
Andreas Lunden (SWE)

1–0
2–0
3–0
3–1
3–2
3–3
4–3

0 min
Penalties
0 min
16
Shots
14

10 November 2025; 15:30	Slovakia	2–1 (2–0, 0–1, 0–0)	South Korea	Jessheim Is- og Flerbrukshall, Jessheim; Attendance: 48

Game reference

Referee:
Kevin Webinger (CAN)
Linesmen:
Tibor Fazekas (SRB)
Marius Oswold Hermansen (NOR)

1–0
2–0
2–1

8 min
Penalties
6 min
16
Shots
14

10 November 2025; 19:00	Norway	2–8 (0–4, 1–1, 1–3)	Japan	Jessheim Is- og Flerbrukshall, Jessheim; Attendance: 245

Game reference

Referee:
Bobby Esposito (USA)
Linesmen:
Pavel Blazek (CZE)
Tony Rundstrom (SWE)

0–1
0–2
0–3
0–4
1–4
1–5
1–6
1–7
1–8
2–8

12 min
Penalties
10 min
23
Shots
14

== See also ==
- Para ice hockey at the 2026 Winter Paralympics
