= Griffin LaMarre =

American ice sledge hockey player

Personal information
- Full name: Griffin Louis LaMarre
- Born: November 10, 1996 (age 29) Haverhill, Massachusetts, U.S.

Sport
- Country: United States
- Sport: Ice sled hockey
- Position: Goalie
- Disability: Hereditary spastic paraplegia
Medal record
Para ice hockey
Representing United States
Paralympic Games
Gold medal – first place	2022 Beijing	Team competition
Gold medal – first place	2026 Milano Cortina	Team competition
World Championships
Gold medal – first place	2023 Moose Jaw	Team competition
Gold medal – first place	2025 Buffalo	Team competition
Silver medal – second place	2024 Calgary	Team competition

Griffin LaMarre (born November 10, 1996) is an American ice sled hockey player. He was a member of the United States national team that won gold at the 2022 and 2026 Winter Paralympics. Griffin is a goaltender.

== Career ==
LaMarre represented the United States at the 2022 Winter Paralympics and won a gold medal. He made his Paralympic debut on March 6, 2022, in the third period of a game against South Korea. He entered the game as a reserve goalie for Jen Lee and allowed one goal in 15 minutes.

He represented the United States at the 2023 World Para Ice Hockey Championships and won a gold medal. He again represented the United States at the 2024 World Para Ice Hockey Championships and won a silver medal.

On January 2, 2026, he was named to Team USA's roster for the 2026 Winter Paralympics. He won a gold medal, Team USA's fifth consecutive gold medal in Para ice hockey at the Winter Paralympics.
