= PalaItalia =

Indoor arena in Milan, Italy

Unipol Dome
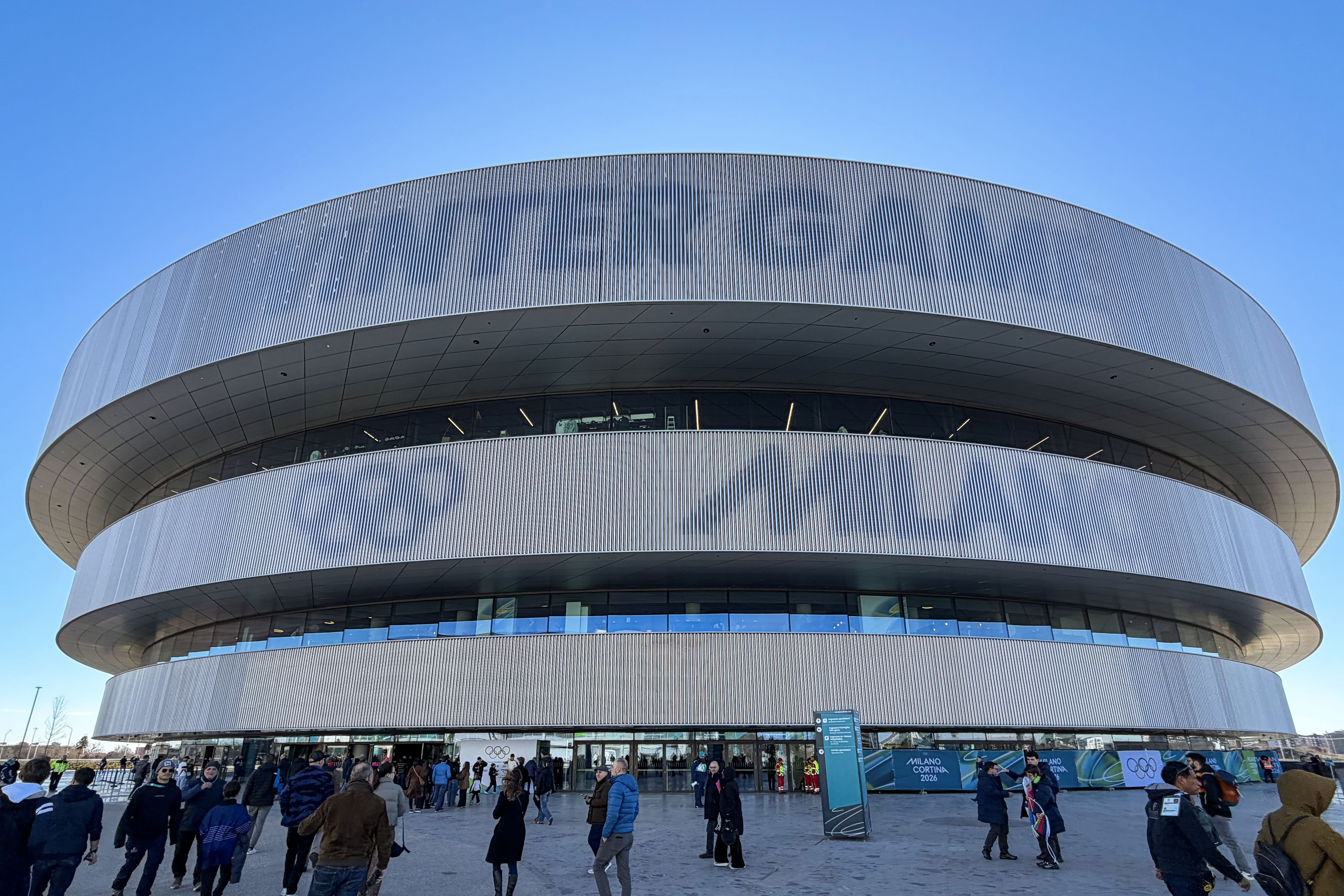
- The arena during the 2026 Winter Olympics
- Interactive map of Unipol Dome
- Location: Milano Santa Giulia, Milan, Italy
- Coordinates: 45°26′29″N 9°15′18″E
- Operator: CTS Eventim
- Capacity: 16,000 (12,000 seats, 4,000 standing)

Construction
- Groundbreaking: 2023
- Opened: 10 January 2026
- Cost: €240–280 million
- Architects: Arup; David Chipperfield
- General contractor: Eteria Consortium

Website
- arenamilano.it

Arena Milano, known as Unipol Dome for sponsorship reasons, and also known as PalaItalia Santa Giulia, is an indoor arena in Milan, Italy. It accommodates 16,000 spectators, with 12,000 seats and 4,000 standing for concerts. Arena Milano is the largest indoor arena for sporting and entertainment in Milan.

The venue hosted ice hockey during the 2026 Winter Olympics and hosted para ice hockey during the 2026 Winter Paralympics.

== History ==
The arena is part of the redevelopment of the Santa Giulia district, located in the south-eastern suburbs of Milan known as Montecity-Rogoredo. The idea of creating the Arena Milano arose during the Milan–Cortina d'Ampezzo bid for the 2026 Winter Olympics; however, the city administration decided that the facility should be built regardless of if the bid was successful.

The design was entrusted to Risanamento S.p.A. through its subsidiary, Santa Giulia S.p.A.

One week before the International Olympic Committee vote on the host for the 2026 Winter Olympics, the company announced that it had signed an agreement with real estate company Lendlease and Ogv Europe Limited for the construction of the arena. The remediation of the area where the sports facility is being built began in the early months of 2022.

In 2025, the Italian government allocated €51 million to help the builder cover additional costs that arose during the construction of the project.

Between January 10 and 11, 2026, with the arena still incomplete, the 2025–26 Italian Cup and Serie A championship final four ice hockey matches were held to inaugurate the ice rink.

== Criticism ==
Arena Milano has faced criticism for being used for official events, including the Italian Cup Final Four and Serie A ice hockey games, despite still being incomplete. During some games, ongoing construction work and technical issues were reported. In a separate incident, one game was temporarily halted due to a hole forming in the ice, which raised doubts about the reliability of the facility.

The condition of the venue has also drawn criticism from international media, especially from those associated with the National Hockey League, with concerns about whether the arena fully meets Olympic standards and whether the construction would be completed on time.

International Ice Hockey Federation president Luc Tardif announced in January 2026 that the stands would not be completed on time, leading to reduced capacity, but assured that the rink and player facilities would be ready.

The controversies are part of a broader debate about infrastructure delays related to the 2026 Winter Olympics, particularly regarding the completion of service areas and external works of the facility.

== Gallery ==
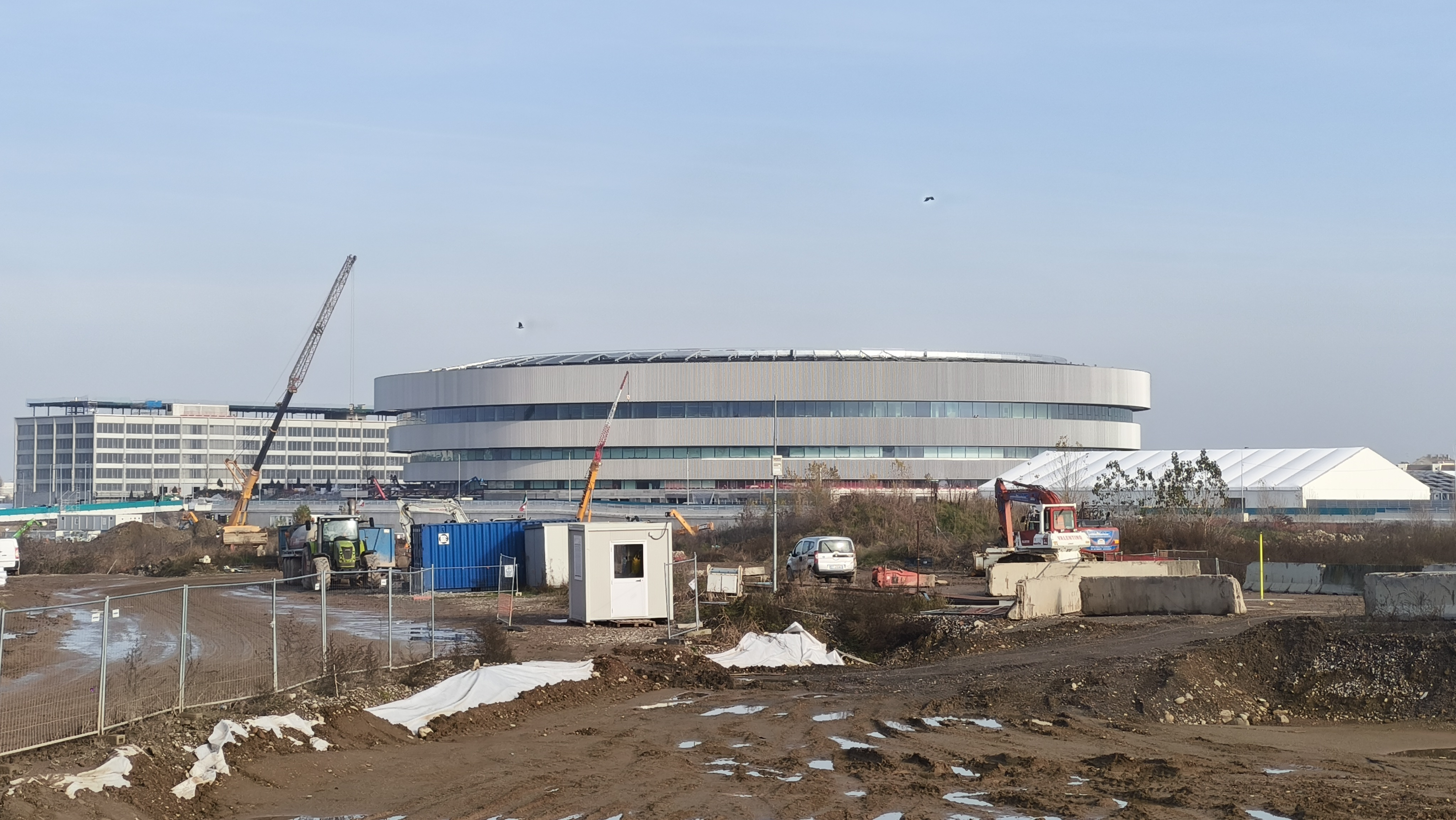
Palaitalia under construction in 2025

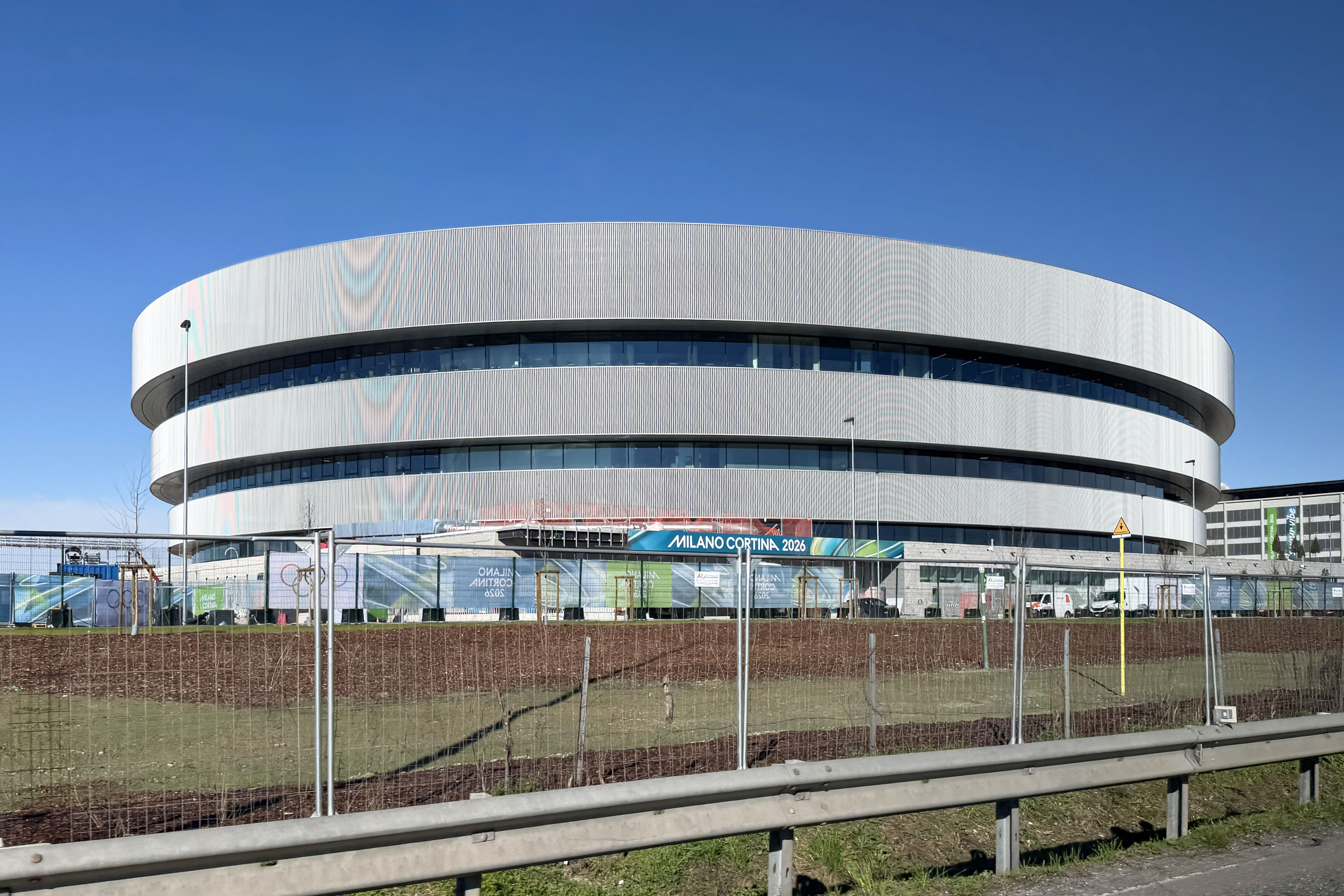
Exterior of the arena

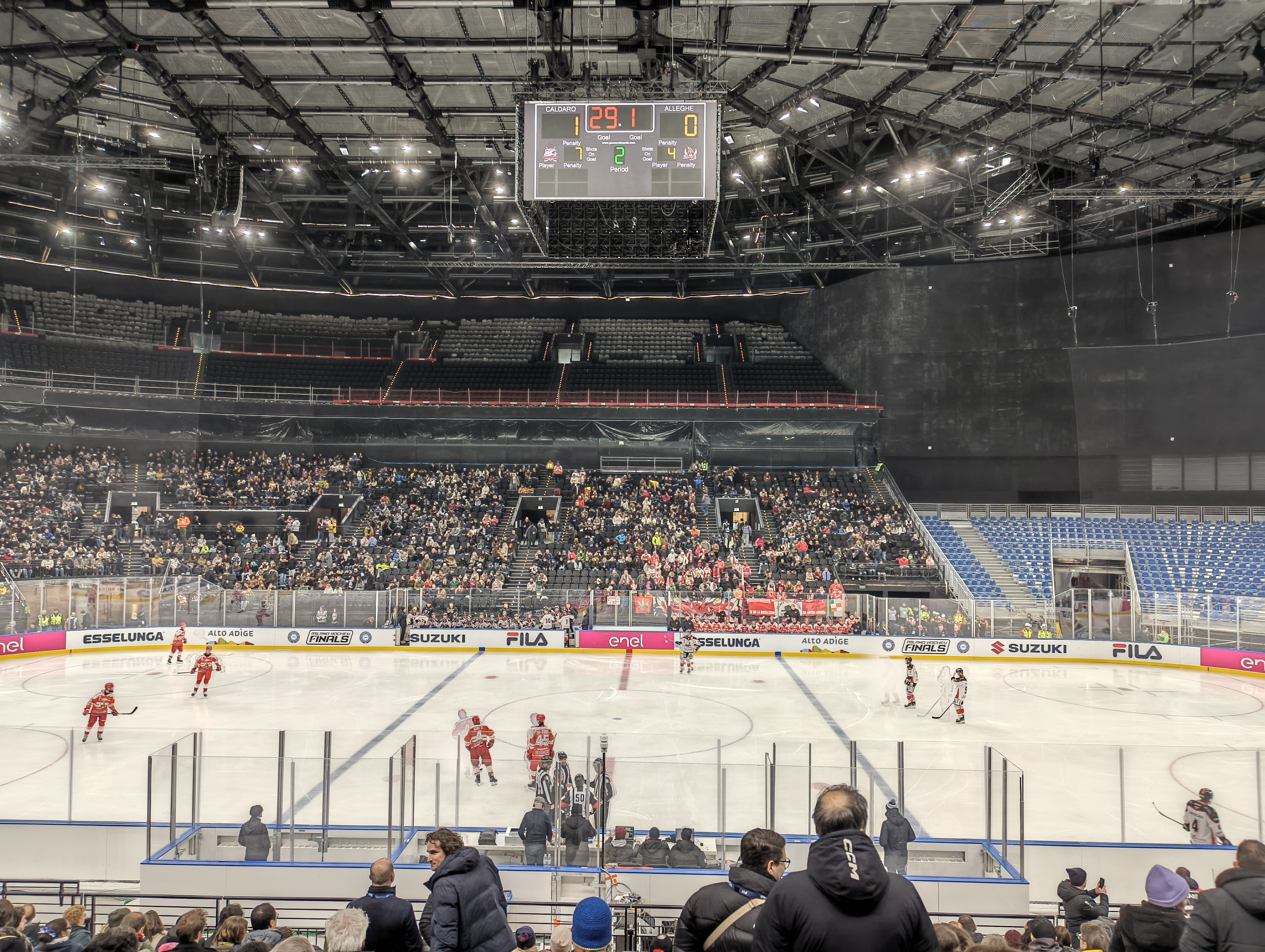
PalaItalia from the inside on 11 January 2026

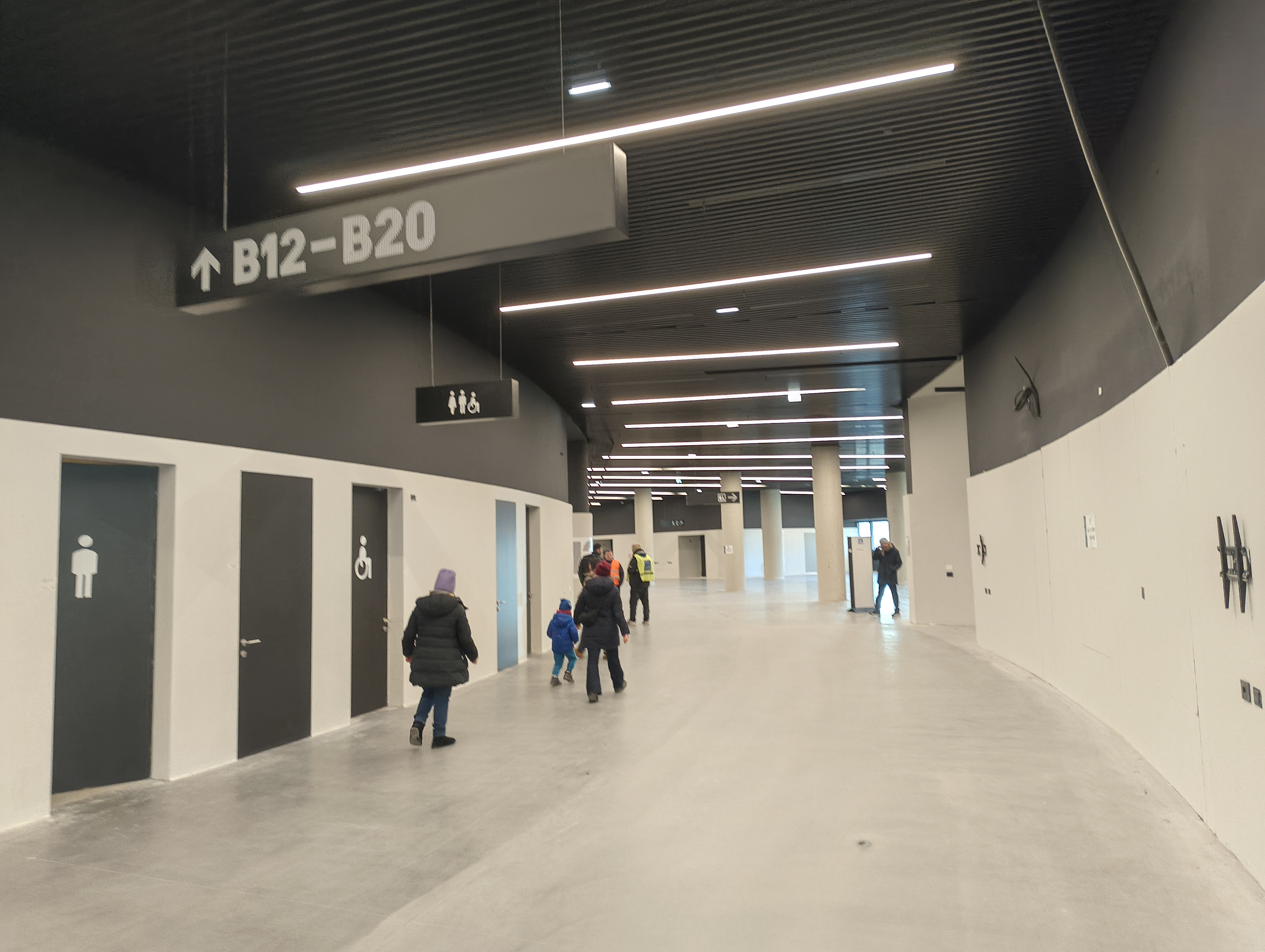
Corridor

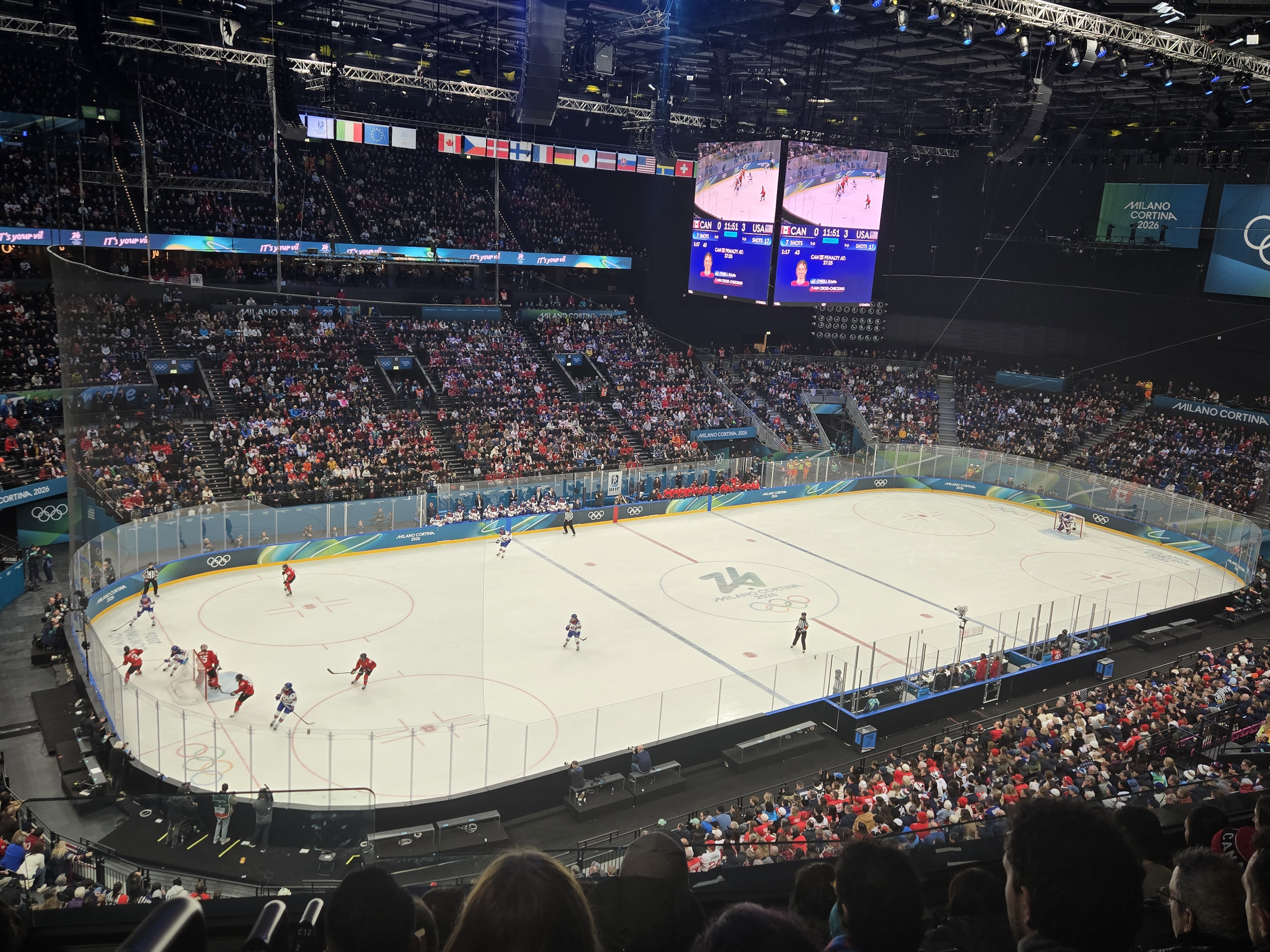
Canada versus United States preliminary women's hockey game during the 2026 Winter Olympics.

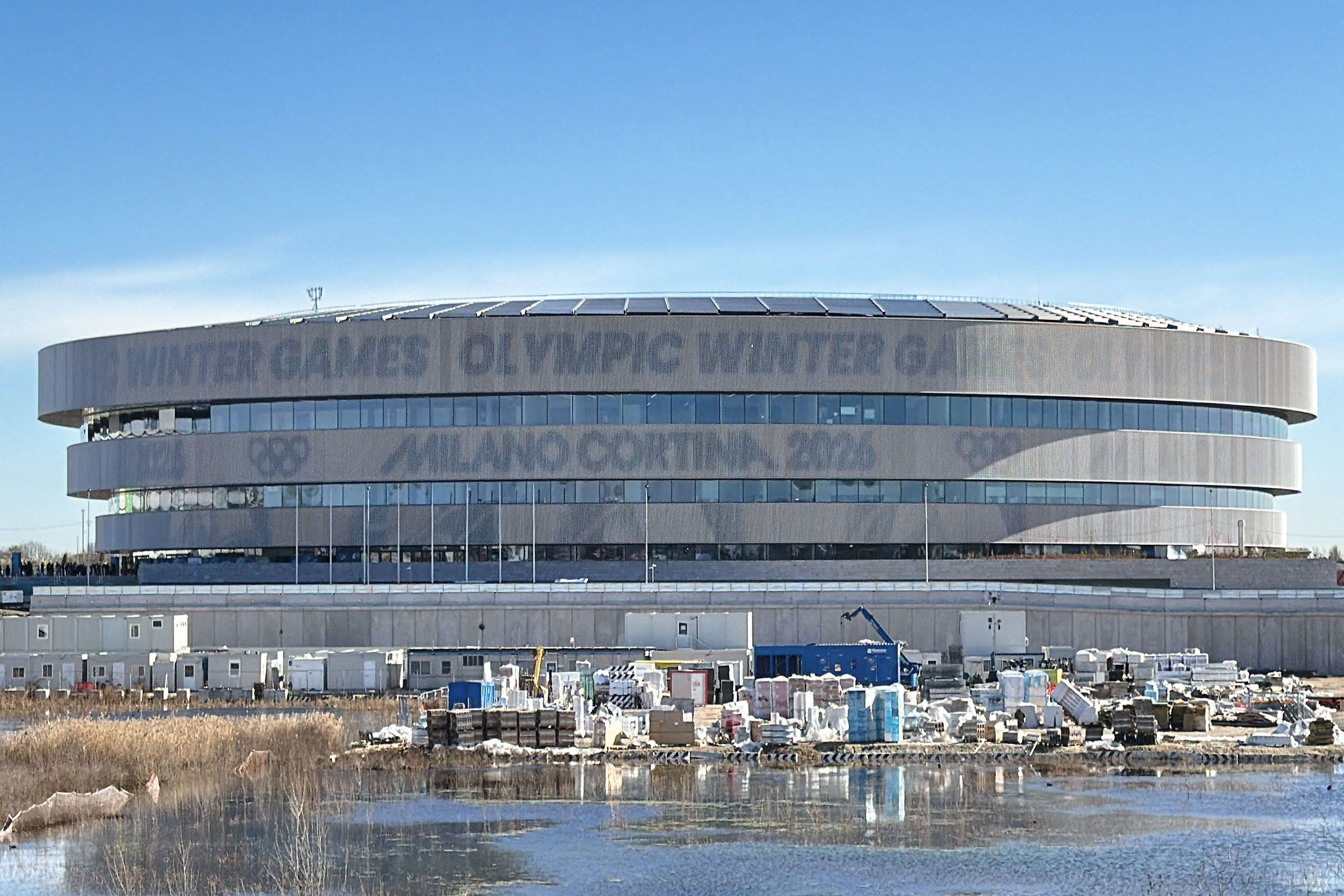
Outside of the arena during the 2026 Winter Olympics.

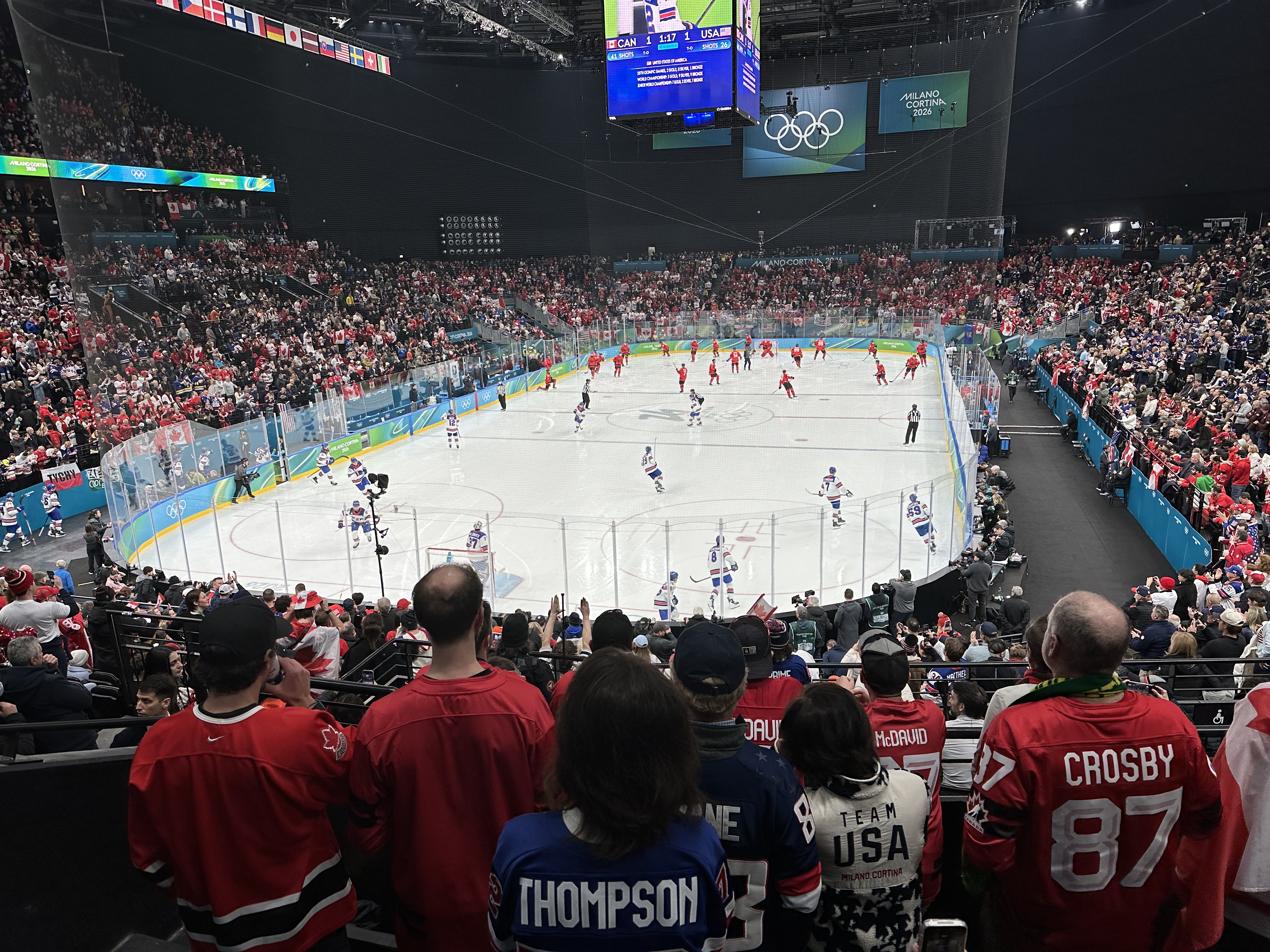
United States versus Canada gold medal game during the 2026 Winter Olympics.

== See also ==
- List of indoor arenas in Italy
- List of European ice hockey arenas
- Unipol Forum
