= Vincent Boily =

Canadian sledge hockey player (born 2000)

Personal information
- Born: June 2, 2000 (age 26) Alma, Quebec, Canada

Sport
- Country: Canada
- Sport: Ice sled hockey
- Position: Forward
Medal record
Para ice hockey
Representing Canada
Paralympic Games
Silver medal – second place	2026 Milano Cortina	Team competition
World Championships
Gold medal – first place	2024 Calgary	Team competition
Silver medal – second place	2023 Moose Jaw	Team competition
Silver medal – second place	2025 Buffalo	Team competition

Vincent Boily (born June 2, 2000) is a Canadian ice sled hockey player. He is a member of the Canada national team that won a silver medal at the 2026 Winter Paralympics. Boily also won a gold medal at the 2024 World Para Ice Hockey Championships.

== Early life ==
Boily was born in Alma, Quebec and began playing ice hockey when he was young, He played for the St-Eustache Vikings in minor ice hockey until December 2017 when he was paralyzed in a snowmobile accident. Shortly afterward, he began to take up para sports, initially in para rowing and para cycling before switching to sledge hockey.

== Career ==
Boily made his first Canada national team roster in 2022 at 22 years old. He represented Canada at the 2024 World Para Ice Hockey Championships and won a gold medal. He also represented his country at the 2023 World Para Ice Hockey Championships, where his team lost to the United States, something that was repeated in the 2025 edition. He was also part of the Canada national team that reached the 2025 Para Hockey Cup final and lost to the United States.

On January 20, 2026, Boily was named to the Canada national team roster for the 2026 Winter Paralympics. He won a silver medal, Canada's third consecutive silver medal in Para ice hockey at the Winter Paralympics.

== Personal life ==
In April 2026, Canadian tennis player Leylah Fernandez confirmed on social media that she and Boily were in a relationship.
