= Anton Jacobs-Webb =

Canadian ice sledge hockey player

Personal information
- Born: September 18, 2000 (age 25) Halifax, Nova Scotia, Canada

Sport
- Country: Canada
- Sport: Ice sledge hockey
Medal record
Para ice hockey
Representing Canada
Paralympic Games
Silver medal – second place	2022 Beijing	Team competition
Silver medal – second place	2026 Milano Cortina	Team competition
World Championships
Gold medal – first place	2024 Calgary	Team competition
Silver medal – second place	2021 Ostrava	Team competition
Silver medal – second place	2023 Moose Jaw	Team competition
Silver medal – second place	2025 Buffalo	Team competition

Anton Jacobs-Webb (born September 18, 2000) is a Canadian ice sledge hockey player. He won silver medals at the 2022 and 2026 Winter Paralympics. He also competed at the 2024 World Para Ice Hockey Championships and won a gold medal.

== Early life ==
Jacobs-Webb was born on September 18, 2000, in Williamswood, Nova Scotia. He was born with a birth defect which caused his left leg to be shorter than his right. Jacobs-Webb became interested in Para ice hockey when he met Hervé Lord as a pre-teen who then invited him to the local para hockey club in Ottawa. He had surgery to amputate his leg above the knee in 2012 and began walking with a prosthesis.

== Career ==
Jacobs-Webb made his international debut at the 2021 World Para Ice Hockey Championships while also completing the first year of his mechanical engineering undergraduate degree at Concordia University. He helped the team qualify for the gold medal round where they lost to the United States and took home second place. Following this, Jacobs-Webb was named to Team Canada for the 2022 Winter Paralympics in Beijing. During the tournament, they again faced the United States in the gold-medal round which they lost 5–0 to earn silver. He competed at the 2026 Winter Paralympics and won a silver medal, Canada's third consecutive silver medal in Para ice hockey at the Winter Paralympics.
