= Shen Yifeng =

Chinese ice sledge hockey player (born 1998)

Personal information
- Born: 22 April 1998 (age 28) Hebei, China

Sport
- Country: China
- Sport: Ice sled hockey
Medal record
Para ice hockey
Representing China
Paralympic Games
Bronze medal – third place	2022 Beijing	Team competition
Bronze medal – third place	2026 Milano Cortina	Team competition

Shen Yifeng (Chinese: 申翼风; born 22 April 1998) is a Chinese ice sled hockey player who is a member of the China national para ice hockey team. He represented China at the 2022 and 2026 Winter Paralympics.

== Career ==
Shen represented China at the 2022 Winter Paralympics and won a bronze medal. He led the team in scoring with eight goals and six assists. This was China's first international medal only five years after starting a para ice hockey program. In February 2026, he was again selected to represent China at the 2026 Winter Paralympics. During the bronze medal game against Czechia, China trailed 2–0 before scoring three unanswered goals to win their second consecutive bronze medal.
