= China national para ice hockey team =

International sledge hockey team

China
- Head coach: Yin Jiwu (2023-); Nikolay Sharshukov (2017-2022)
- Assistants: Zhang Lei
- Captain: Cui Yutao
- Home stadium: Qingdao Sports Centre Conson Gymnasium
- IIHF code: CHN

First international
- 2017 Worlds

Biggest win
- China 40–0 Australia (Ostrava, Czech Republic; 7 November 2018)

Biggest defeat
- China 0–11 USA (Beijing, China; 11 March 2022)

Paralympics
- Appearances: 2 (first in 2022)
- Medals: Bronze: (2022, 2026)

World Para Ice Hockey Championships
- Appearances: 3 (first in 2017)
- Best result: Fourth place 2023, 2024, 2025

Medal record

Paralympic Games
| Bronze medal – third place | 2022 Beijing | Team |
| Bronze medal – third place | 2026 Milano Cortina | Team |

World Championship
| Gold medal – first place | 2018 Vierumaki (Pool C) | Team |
| Gold medal – first place | 2021 Czech Republic (Pool B) | Team |
| Bronze medal – third place | 2019 Czech Republic (Pool B) | Team |

The China national para ice hockey team (simplified Chinese: 中国残奥冰球队; traditional Chinese: 中國殘奥冰球隊; pinyin: Zhōngguó cánaò bīngqiú duì, recognized as China), established in 2017, represents the People's Republic of China in international sledge hockey competitions and is governed by the Winter Sports Management Center of the State Sports General Administration of China (国家体育总局冬季运动管理中心).

== History ==
The national para ice hockey team was established in September, 2017 by the China Disabled Persons' Federation, Qingdao Municipal People's Government, Shandong Disabled Persons' Federation in Qingdao, Shandong province.

== Competitive results ==
=== Para-ice hockey world championships ===
In 2018, after roughly 1 year of establishment and playing 2 official international matches, the para ice hockey team debuted in Pool C and stormed Australia by a 40:0, which is the team's biggest victory in a match. In the gold medal match, China beat hosts Finland 5:0, successfully proceed to Pool B in the 2019 edition.

In 2019, the para ice hockey team competed in Pool B of the 2019 World Para Ice Hockey Championships, winning the bronze medal after winning Germany 4:1, Poland 17:0, Great Britain 17:0; and losing to Slovakia 1:2, Russia 1:3.

In 2021, the para ice hockey team continued to compete in Pool B of the 2021 World Para Ice Hockey Championships, winning the gold medal and proceed to Pool A of the championships after winning Poland 18:0, Finland 12:0; Japan 15:0, Sweden 6:0 and Germany 10:2.

In 2023, the para ice hockey debut in Pool A of the 2023 World Para Ice Hockey Championships. The team was warmly greeted and welcomed by a 20-car fleet organized by the local Chinese community, mostly Richmond residents at the Vancouver International Airport. Meanwhile, after arriving at Regina, the team was also warmly welcomed by Canadian Chinese residents, where traditional lion dance is performed. The team crushed Italy 10:1 and beat traditional powerhouse Norway 5:1 and Germany 7:0 in the preliminary rounds. In the quarterfinals, the team beat the experienced South Korean team by 7:2, proceeding to semi-finals and will be facing traditional powerhouse USA. After losing to U.S. by 2:10, the team fought against European powerhouse the Czech Republic, eventually losing by 2:3, getting the fourth place in the championships.

In 2024, the para ice hockey team continued their race in the A pool of the World Para Ice Hockey Championships, losing to Czech in the second consecutive year in the bronze medal match, getting the fourth place in the championships.

=== Paralympics Games ===
In 2022, which is China's home winter Paralympics games and the team's first appearance at the games, the national ice sledge hockey team won a historic bronze after defeating South Korea 4–0. It is considered a remarkable achievement, as the ice hockey team was established in 2017 and had achieved huge progress in the past 5 years.

== Team members ==
- Bai Xuesong
- Che Hang
- Cui Yutao
- Hu Guangjian
- Ji Yanzhao
- Li Hongguan
- Lyu Zhi
- Shen Yifeng
- Song Xiaodong
- Tian Jintao
- Wang Jujiang
- Wang Wei
- Wang Zhidong
- Xu Jinqiang
- Yu Jing (Female)
- Zhang Zheng
- Zhu Zhanfu

== Honor ==
- Outstanding contributors to the Beijing Winter Olympics and Paralympics (Chinese: 北京冬奥会、冬残奥会突出贡献集体) (2022)
