= Czech Republic men's national ice sledge hockey team =

Czech Republic
- Head coach: Jakub Novotný
- Captain: Radek Zelinka
- Team colors
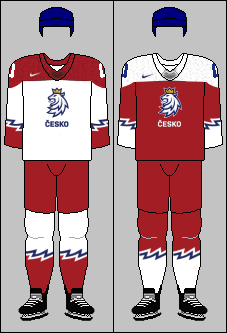

Paralympics
- Appearances: 4 (first in 2010)

IIHF World Championships
- Appearances: 11 (first in 2008)
- Best result: Bronze: (2023, 2024, 2025)

The Czech Republic men's national ice sledge hockey team represents the Czech Republic at the IPC World Championships and Paralympic Games.

== Competition history ==
=== Paralympic Games ===
Year	Host	GP	W	OTW	OTL	L	GF	GA	Coach	Captain	Finish	Ref.
2010	Vancouver, Canada	5	1	2	0	2	10	10	Tomáš Zelenka	Pavel Kubeš	5th	
2014	Sochi, Russia	5	2	1	1	1	8	4	Jiří Bříza	Zdeněk Šafránek	5th	
2018	Pyeongchang, South Korea	5	1	1	1	2	11	21	Jiří Bříza	Zdeněk Šafránek	6th	
2022	Beijing, China	5	2	0	1	2	16	13	Jakub Novotný	Pavel Kubeš	6th	

=== World Championships ===
Year	Host	GP	W	OTW	OTL	L	GF	GA	Coach	Captain	Finish	Ref.
2008	United States	4	2	0	0	2	11	5	Tomáš Zelenka	Jiří Berger	8th (2nd in the B tournament)	
2009	Czech Republic	5	1	1	2	1	6	6	Tomáš Zelenka	Jiří Berger	5th	
2012	Norway	5	2	1	1	1	8	5	Miroslav Hornich	Pavel Kubeš	4th	
2013	South Korea	5	2	0	0	3	4	12	Jiří Bříza	Zdeněk Šafránek	4th	
2015	United States	5	2	0	0	3	8	8	Jiří Bříza	Zdeněk Šafránek	8th (relegated to B-Pool)	
2017	Japan	4	4	0	0	0	23	0	Jiří Bříza	Zdeněk Šafránek	8th (1st in B-Pool)	
2019	Czech Republic	6	4	0	0	2	26	14	Jiří Bříza	Michal Geier	4th	
2021	Czech Republic	5	1	0	0	4	2	24	Jiří Bříza	Pavel Kubeš	5th	
2023	Canada	6	3	0	0	3	12	16	Jakub Novotný	Radek Zelinka	3rd place, bronze medalist(s)	
2024	Canada	5	3	0	0	2	14	11	Jakub Novotný	Radek Zelinka	3rd place, bronze medalist(s)	
2025	United States	5	2	1	0	2	15	9	Jakub Novotný	Radek Zelinka	3rd place, bronze medalist(s)	
