= List of 2022 Winter Paralympics medal winners =

The 2022 Winter Paralympics, officially the XIII Paralympic Winter Games, or the 13th Winter Paralympics, were held from 4 to 13 March 2022 in Beijing, China. There were 78 events in six winter sports.

== Alpine skiing ==
=== Women's events ===
Event	Class	Gold		Silver		Bronze	
Downhill	visually impaired	Henrieta Farkašová; Guide: Martin Motyka; Slovakia	1:19.50	Zhu Daqing; Guide: Yan Hanhan; China	1:21.75	Millie Knight; Guide: Brett Wild; Great Britain	1:23.20
Downhill	sitting	Momoka Muraoka; Japan	1:29.77	Anna-Lena Forster; Germany	1:30.59	Liu Sitong; China	1:32.10
Downhill	standing	Mollie Jepsen; Canada	1:21.75	Zhang Mengqiu; China	1:21.85	Ebba Årsjö; Sweden	1:23.20
Super-G	visually impaired	Alexandra Rexová; Guide: Eva Trajčíková; Slovakia	1:17.01	Menna Fitzpatrick; Guide: Gary Smith; Great Britain	1:18.79	Zhu Daqing; Guide: Yan Hanhan; China	1:19.30
Super-G	sitting	Momoka Muraoka; Japan	1:23.73	Anna-Lena Forster; Germany	1:23.84	Zhang Wenjing; China	1:24.31
Super-G	standing	Zhang Mengqiu; China	1:13.54	Marie Bochet; France	1:14.97	Alana Ramsay; Canada	1:16.84
Giant slalom	visually impaired	Veronika Aigner; Guide: Elisabeth Aigner; Austria	1:52.54	Zhu Daqing; Guide: Yan Hanhan; China	1:59.85	Barbara Aigner; Guide: Klara Sykora; Austria	1:59.93
Giant slalom	sitting	Momoka Muraoka; Japan	2:02.27	Liu Sitong; China	2:09.55	Zhang Wenjing; China	2:09.55
Giant slalom	standing	Zhang Mengqiu; China	1:55.12	Mollie Jepsen; Canada	2:00.95	Andrea Rothfuss; Germany	2:01.91
Slalom	visually impaired	Veronika Aigner; Guide: Elisabeth Aigner; Austria	1:31.53	Barbara Aigner; Guide: Klara Sykora; Austria	1:33.24	Alexandra Rexová; Guide: Eva Trajčíková; Slovakia	1:36.31
Slalom	sitting	Anna-Lena Forster; Germany	1:37.86	Zhang Wenjing; China	1:40.18	Liu Sitong; China	1:41.31
Slalom	standing	Ebba Årsjö; Sweden	1:31.76	Zhang Mengqiu; China	1:37.40	Anna-Maria Rieder; Germany	1:40.50
Super combined	visually impaired	Henrieta Farkašová; Guide: Michal Červeň; Slovakia	2:03.39	Zhu Daqing; Guide: Yan Hanhan; China	2:04.25	Menna Fitzpatrick; Guide: Gary Smith; Great Britain	2:05.98
Super combined	sitting	Anna-Lena Forster; Germany	2:11.37	Momoka Muraoka; Japan	2:12.14	Liu Sitong; China	2:15.84
Super combined	standing	Ebba Årsjö; Sweden	1:56.51	Zhang Mengqiu; China	1:58.02	Alana Ramsay; Canada	2:06.33

=== Men's events ===
Event	Class	Gold		Silver		Bronze	
Downhill	visually impaired	Johannes Aigner; Guide: Matteo Fleischmann; Austria	1:13.45	Mac Marcoux; Guide: Jack Leitch; Canada	1:13.81	Hyacinthe Deleplace; Guide: Valentin Giraud Moine; France	1:14.10
Downhill	sitting	Corey Peters; New Zealand	1:16.73	Jesper Pedersen; Norway	1:17.99	Taiki Morii; Japan	1:18.29
Downhill	standing	Arthur Bauchet; France	1:14.92	Markus Salcher; Austria	1:15.25	Théo Gmür; Switzerland	1:16.17
Super-G	visually impaired	Neil Simpson; Guide: Andrew Simpson; Great Britain	1:08.91	Giacomo Bertagnolli; Guide: Andrea Ravelli; Italy	1:09.31	Johannes Aigner; Guide: Matteo Fleischmann; Austria	1:09.74
Super-G	sitting	Jesper Pedersen; Norway	1:09.69	Corey Peters; New Zealand	1:10.16	Taiki Morii; Japan	1:10.61
Super-G	standing	Liang Jingyi; China	1:09.11	Markus Salcher; Austria	1:09.35	Alexis Guimond; Canada	1:10.02
Giant slalom	visually impaired	Johannes Aigner; Guide: Matteo Fleischmann; Austria	1:49.34	Giacomo Bertagnolli; Guide: Andrea Ravelli; Italy	1:51.02	Miroslav Haraus; Guide: Maroš Hudík; Slovakia	1:54.92
Giant slalom	sitting	Jesper Pedersen; Norway	1:54.20	René De Silvestro; Italy	1:57.50	Liang Zilu; China	2:00.92
Giant slalom	standing	Santeri Kiiveri; Finland	1:55.40	Thomas Walsh; United States	1:55.44	Arthur Bauchet; France	1:55.89
Slalom	visually impaired	Giacomo Bertagnolli; Guide: Andrea Ravelli; Italy	1:26.82	Johannes Aigner; Guide: Matteo Fleischmann; Austria	1:27.10	Miroslav Haraus; Guide: Maroš Hudík; Slovakia	1:36.22
Slalom	sitting	Jesper Pedersen; Norway	1:31.10	Niels de Langen; Netherlands	1:37.18	René De Silvestro; Italy	1:38.44
Slalom	standing	Arthur Bauchet; France	1:29.61	Liang Jingyi; China	1:32.27	Adam Hall; New Zealand	1:33.21
Super combined	visually impaired	Giacomo Bertagnolli; Guide: Andrea Ravelli; Italy	1:49.80	Johannes Aigner; Guide: Matteo Fleischmann; Austria	1:51.98	Neil Simpson; Guide: Andrew Simpson; Great Britain	1:52.81
Super combined	sitting	Jesper Pedersen; Norway	1:50.23	Jeroen Kampschreur; Netherlands	1:50.51	Niels de Langen; Netherlands	1:53.40
Super combined	standing	Arthur Bauchet; France	1:50.26	Santeri Kiiveri; Finland	1:54.48	Adam Hall; New Zealand	1:54.77

== Biathlon ==
=== Women's events ===
Event	Class	Gold		Silver		Bronze	
6 kilometres	Visually impaired	Oksana Shyshkova; Guide: Andriy Marchenko; Ukraine	20:09.0	Linn Kazmaier; Guide: Florian Baumann; Germany	20:14.6	Leonie Maria Walter; Guide: Pirmin Strecker; Germany	20:39.0
6 kilometres	Sitting	Oksana Masters; United States	20:51.2	Shan Yilin; China	21:06.3	Kendall Gretsch; United States	21:52.9
6 kilometres	Standing	Guo Yujie; China	19:43.3	Liudmyla Liashenko; Ukraine	19:51.7	Zhao Zhiqing; China	20:05.1
10 kilometres	Visually impaired	Leonie Maria Walter; Guide: Pirmin Strecker; Germany	40:56.2	Oksana Shyshkova; Guide: Andriy Marchenko; Ukraine	40:59.9	Wang Yue; Guide: Li Yalin; China	42:50.3
10 kilometres	Sitting	Kendall Gretsch; United States	33:12.3	Oksana Masters; United States	33:21.0	Anja Wicker; Germany	35:45.3
10 kilometres	Standing	Iryna Bui; Ukraine	36:43.1	Oleksandra Kononova; Ukraine	36:55.9	Liudmyla Liashenko; Ukraine	36:56.9
12.5 kilometres	Visually impaired	Oksana Shyshkova; Guide: Andriy Marchenko; Ukraine	50:19.6	Linn Kazmaier; Guide: Florian Baumann; Germany	50:23.2	Leonie Maria Walter; Guide: Pirmin Strecker; Germany	52:27.6
12.5 kilometres	Sitting	Oksana Masters; United States	41:17.9	Kendall Gretsch; United States	42:23.7	Shan Yilin; China	42:36.6
12.5 kilometres	Standing	Liudmyla Liashenko; Ukraine	47:22.0	Zhao Zhiqing; China	48:06.3	Brittany Hudak; Canada	49:03.4

=== Men's events ===
Event	Class	Gold		Silver		Bronze	
6 kilometres	Visually impaired	Vitaliy Lukyanenko; Guide: Borys Babar; Ukraine	17:05.8	Oleksandr Kazik; Guide: Serhii Kucheriavyi; Ukraine	17:31.9	Dmytro Suiarko; Guide: Oleksandr Nikonovych; Ukraine	17:33.3
6 kilometres	Sitting	Liu Zixu; China	18:51.5	Taras Rad; Ukraine	19:09.0	Liu Mengtao; China	19:32.3
6 kilometres	Standing	Grygorii Vovchynskyi; Ukraine	16:17.6	Marco Maier; Germany	17:03.4	Mark Arendz; Canada	17:13.6
10 kilometres	Visually impaired	Vitaliy Lukyanenko; Guide: Borys Babar; Ukraine	34:12.7	Anatolii Kovalevskyi; Guide: Oleksandr Mukshyn; Ukraine	34:57.3	Dmytro Suiarko; Guide: Oleksandr Nikonovych; Ukraine	35:30.9
10 kilometres	Sitting	Liu Mengtao; China	30:37.7	Martin Fleig; Germany	31:23.7	Taras Rad; Ukraine	31:26.9
10 kilometres	Standing	Mark Arendz; Canada	31:45.2	Grygorii Vovchynskyi; Ukraine	32:18.0	Alexandr Gerlits; Kazakhstan	33:06.5
12.5 kilometres	Visually impaired	Oleksandr Kazik; Guide: Serhii Kucheriavyi; Ukraine	43:16.1	Vitaliy Lukyanenko; Guide: Borys Babar; Ukraine	44:44.3	Yu Shuang; Guide: Wang Guanyu; China	46:35.3
12.5 kilometres	Sitting	Liu Mengtao; China	38:29.4	Taras Rad; Ukraine	39:13.9	Liu Zixu; China	39:27.5
12.5 kilometres	Standing	Benjamin Daviet; France	37:58.9	Mark Arendz; Canada	40:13.0	Grygorii Vovchynskyi; Ukraine	40:13.0

== Cross-country skiing ==
=== Women's events ===
Event	Class	Gold		Silver		Bronze	
Sprint	Visually impaired	Carina Edlinger; Guide: Josef Lorenz; Austria	3:49.6	Oksana Shyshkova; Guide: Andriy Marchenko; Ukraine	3:56.4	Linn Kazmaier; Guide: Florian Baumann; Germany	4:05.2
Sprint	Sitting	Yang Hongqiong; China	3:18.2	Oksana Masters; United States	3:19.9	Li Panpan; China	3:31.0
Sprint	Standing	Natalie Wilkie; Canada	4:05.1	Vilde Nilsen; Norway	4:08.1	Sydney Peterson; United States	4:12.1
7.5 kilometres	Sitting	Yang Hongqiong; China	24:47.5	Oksana Masters; United States	25:24.7	Ma Jing; China	26:22.9
10 kilometres	Visually impaired	Linn Kazmaier; Guide: Florian Baumann; Germany	41:40.8	Wang Yue; Guide: Li Yalin; China	42:20.3	Carina Edlinger; Guide: Josef Lorenz; Austria	43:13.9
10 kilometres	Standing	Oleksandra Kononova; Ukraine	41:18.0	Natalie Wilkie; Canada	41:45.3	Iryna Bui; Ukraine	41:47.1
15 kilometres	Sitting	Yang Hongqiong; China	43:06.7	Oksana Masters; United States	43:38.8	Li Panpan; China	45:17.0
15 kilometres freestyle	Visually impaired	Oksana Shyshkova; Guide: Andriy Marchenko; Ukraine	51:09.1	Linn Kazmaier; Guide: Florian Baumann; Germany	52:05.6	Leonie Maria Walter; Guide: Pirmin Strecker; Germany	54:08.8
15 kilometres freestyle	Standing	Natalie Wilkie; Canada	48:04.8	Sydney Peterson; United States	49:00.2	Brittany Hudak; Canada	49:27.8

=== Men's events ===
Event	Class	Gold		Silver		Bronze	
Sprint	Visually impaired	Brian McKeever; Guide: Russell Kennedy; Canada	3:19.5	Jake Adicoff; Guide: Sam Wood; United States	3:20.3	Zebastian Modin; Guide: Emil Jönsson; Sweden	3:37.8
Sprint	Sitting	Zheng Peng; China	2:42.4	Mao Zhongwu; China	2:44.9	Collin Cameron; Canada	2:46.3
Sprint	Standing	Benjamin Daviet; France	3:07.5	Marco Maier; Germany	3:08.8	Grygorii Vovchynskyi; Ukraine	3:09.3
10 kilometres	Sitting	Mao Zhongwu; China	29:10.7	Zheng Peng; China	30:08.4	Giuseppe Romele; Italy	31:42.5
12.5 kilometres	Visually impaired	Brian McKeever; Guide: Russell Kennedy; Canada	33:06.6	Zebastian Modin; Guide: Emil Jönsson; Sweden	33:59.1	Dmytro Suiarko; Guide: Oleksandr Nikonovych; Ukraine	34:08.1
12.5 kilometres	Standing	Wang Chenyang; China	33:07.8	Benjamin Daviet; France	33:09.1	Cai Jiayun; China	33:18.0
18 kilometres	Sitting	Zheng Peng; China	43:09.2	Mao Zhongwu; China	43:23.8	Collin Cameron; Canada	47:36.6
20 kilometres classical	Visually impaired	Brian McKeever; Guide: Russell Kennedy; Canada	55:36.7	Jake Adicoff; Guide: Sam Wood; United States	58:54.4	Zebastian Modin; Guide: Emil Jönsson; Sweden	1:00:05.4
20 kilometres classical	Standing	Taiki Kawayoke; Japan	52:52.8	Cai Jiayun; China	54:27.7	Qiu Mingyang; China	54:29.7

=== Relay events ===
Event	Gold		Silver		Bronze	
4 × 2.5 km Mixed Relay	United States (USA); Oksana Masters; Sydney Peterson; Daniel Cnossen; Jake Adicoff; Guide: Sam Wood	25:59.3	China (CHN); Shan Yilin; Wang Chenyang; Zheng Peng; Cai Jiayun	26:25.3	Canada (CAN); Collin Cameron; Emily Young; Mark Arendz; Natalie Wilkie	27:00.6
4 × 2.5 km Open Relay	Ukraine (UKR); Dmytro Suiarko; Guide: Oleksandr Nikonovych; Grygorii Vovchynskyi; Vasyl Kravchuk; Anatolii Kovalevskyi; Guide: Oleksandr Mukshyn	28:05.3	France (FRA); Benjamin Daviet; Anthony Chalençon; Guide: Alexandre Pouye; Guide: Brice Ottonello	28:30.4	Norway (NOR); Kjartan Haugen; Vilde Nilsen; Thomas Oxaal; Guide: Ole-Martin Lid	28:41.0

== Para ice hockey ==
Event	Gold	Silver	Bronze
Mixed Tournament	United States; Ralph DeQuebec; Travis Dodson; David Eustace; Declan Farmer; Noah Grove; Malik Jones; Griffin LaMarre; Jen Lee; Kevin McKee; Josh Misiewicz; Evan Nichols; Josh Pauls; Rico Roman; Brody Roybal; Jack Wallace; Joseph Woodke; Kyle Zych	Canada; Rob Armstrong; Billy Bridges; Rod Crane; Ben Delaney; Adam Dixon; James Dunn; Tyrone Henry; Liam Hickey; Anton Jacobs-Webb; Adam Kingsmill; Dominic Larocque; Zach Lavin; Antoine Lehoux; Tyler McGregor; Garrett Riley; Branden Sison; Greg Westlake	China; Bai Xuesong; Che Hang; Cui Yutao; Hu Guangjian; Ji Yanzhao; Li Hongguan; Lyu Zhi; Qiu Dianpeng; Shen Yifeng; Song Xiaodong; Tian Jintao; Wang Jujiang; Wang Wei; Wang Zhidong; Xu Jinqiang; Yu Jing; Zhang Zheng; Zhu Zhanfu

== Snowboarding ==
=== Women's events ===
Event	Class	Gold		Silver		Bronze	
Banked slalom	SB-LL2	Brenna Huckaby; United States	1:17.28	Geng Yanhong; China	1:17.38	Li Tiantian; China	1:17.46
Snowboard cross	SB-LL2	Cécile Hernandez; France		Lisa DeJong; Canada		Brenna Huckaby; United States	

=== Men's events ===
Event	Class	Gold		Silver		Bronze	
Banked slalom	SB-LL1	Wu Zhongwei; China	1:10.85	Chris Vos; Netherlands	1:12.06	Tyler Turner; Canada	1:12.84
Banked slalom	SB-LL2	Sun Qi; China	1:09.73	Matti Suur-Hamari; Finland	1:09.98	Ollie Hill; Great Britain	1:10.45
Banked slalom	SB-UL	Maxime Montaggioni; France	1:09.41	Ji Lijia; China	1:09.86	Zhu Yonggang; China	1:10.14
Snowboard cross	SB-LL1	Tyler Turner; Canada		Mike Schultz; United States		Wu Zhongwei; China	
Snowboard cross	SB-LL2	Matti Suur-Hamari; Finland		Garrett Geros; United States		Ben Tudhope; Australia	
Snowboard cross	SB-UL	Ji Lijia; China		Wang Pengyao; China		Zhu Yonggang; China	

== Wheelchair curling ==
Event	Gold	Silver	Bronze
Mixed	China; Wang Haitao; Chen Jianxin; Zhang Mingliang; Yan Zhuo; Sun Yulong	Sweden; Viljo Petersson-Dahl; Ronny Persson; Mats-Ola Engborg; Kristina Ulander; Sabina Johansson	Canada; Jon Thurston; Ina Forrest; Dennis Thiessen; Mark Ideson; Collinda Joseph

== See also ==
- 2022 Winter Paralympics medal table
