= Czech Republic at the 2022 Winter Paralympics =

- Flag of the Czech Republic
- IPC code: CZE
- NPC: Czech Paralympic Committee
- Website: www.paralympic.cz

in Beijing, China 4 March 2022 – 13 March 2022
- Competitors: 21 (21 men) in 2 sports
- Flag bearer: Zdeněk Krupička
- Medals: Gold 0 Silver 0 Bronze 0 Total 0

Winter Paralympics appearances (overview)
- 1994; 1998; 2002; 2006; 2010; 2014; 2018; 2022; 2026

Other related appearances
- Czechoslovakia (1976–1992)

Czech Republic competed at the 2022 Winter Paralympics in Beijing, China which took place between 4–13 March 2022.

== Competitors ==
The following is the list of number of competitors participating at the Games per sport/discipline.

Sport	Men	Women	Total
Alpine skiing	4	0	4
Para ice hockey	17	0	17
Total	21	0	21

== Alpine skiing ==
Czech Republic competed in alpine skiing.

Athlete	Event	Run 1		Run 2		Total	
Athlete	Event	Time	Rank	Time	Rank	Time	Rank
Pavel Bambousek	Men's downhill, sitting	—N/a				DNF	
Pavel Bambousek	Men's giant slalom, sitting	1:13.15	31	1:05.83	18	2:18.98	24
Pavel Bambousek	Men's slalom, sitting	55.34	20	DNF			
Pavel Bambousek	Men's super combined, sitting}	DNF					
Pavel Bambousek	Men's super-G, sitting	—N/a				1:22.51	20
Petr Drahoš	Men's giant slalom, sitting	1:10.89	27	1:10.34	27	2:21.23	27
Petr Drahoš	Men's slalom, sitting	55.45	21	DNF			
Patrik Hetmer; Guide: Miroslav Máčala	Men's giant slalom, visually impaired	1:11.77	10	1:05.99	6	2:17.76	6
Patrik Hetmer; Guide: Miroslav Máčala	Men's slalom, visually impaired	53.70	10	1:00.52	10	1:54.22	10
Tomáš Vaverka	Men's giant slalom, standing	1:09.38	30	1:06.02	28	2:15.40	29
Tomáš Vaverka	Men's slalom, standing	56.63	33	DNF			

== Para ice hockey ==
Czech Republic competed in para ice hockey.

Summary

Team	Event	Preliminary round				Quarterfinal	Semifinal	5th place	
Team	Event	Opposition Result	Opposition Result	Opposition Result	Rank	Opposition Result	Opposition Result	Opposition Result	Rank
Czech Republic	Mixed tournament	Italy; W 5–0	China; L 2–5	Slovakia; W 3–0	2 Q	China; L 3–4	DNQ	Italy; L 3–4	6

Preliminary round

Pos	Team	Pld	W	OTW	OTL	L	GF	GA	GD	Pts	Qualification
1	China (H)	3	3	0	0	0	18	2	+16	9	Quarterfinals
2	Czech Republic	3	2	0	0	1	10	5	+5	6	Quarterfinals
3	Italy	3	0	1	0	2	2	12	−10	2	Quarterfinals
4	Slovakia	3	0	0	1	2	1	12	−11	1	Eliminated

Source: Beijing 2022
(H) Host

5 March 2022; 16:35	Czech Republic	5–0 (2–0, 2–0, 1–0)	Italy	Beijing National Indoor Stadium, Beijing

Game reference

Martin Kudela
Goalies
Gabriele Araudo
Julian Kasslatter
Referee:
(Norway) Kenneth Danielsen
Linesmen:
(Serbia) Tibor Fazekaš
(Austria) David Nothegger

Kubeš (Wagner, Raul) (EA) – 10:49	1–0
Zelinka (Doležal, Raul) – 12:36	2–0
Palát (Krupička, Hábl) – 15:54	3–0
Hečko (Wagner) – 17:31	4–0
Geier (Wagner, Kubeš) (PP) – 36:35	5–0

6 min
Penalties
2 min
14
Shots
11

6 March 2022; 20:05	China	5–2 (0–0, 5–1, 0–1)	Czech Republic	Beijing National Indoor Stadium, Beijing; Attendance: 1,207

Game reference

Ji Yanzhao
Goalies
Martin Kudela
Michal Vápenka
Referee:
(United States) Bobby Esposito
Linesmen:
(Serbia) Tibor Fazekaš
(Sweden) Andreas Lundén

Shen (Wang Z.) – 15:11	1–0
Zhu (Xu, Shen) (PP) – 17:38	2–0
Wang J. – 17:53	3–0
Tian (Li) (SH) – 21:06	4–0
	4–1	21:53 – Ohar (Doležal, Veselý)
Li (Lyu) (SH) – 29:52	5–1
	5–2	43:04 – Krupička (Hečko, Sedláček)

14 min
Penalties
16 min
21
Shots
8

8 March 2022; 20:05	Czech Republic	3–0 (1–0, 1–0, 1–0)	Slovakia	Beijing National Indoor Stadium, Beijing

Game reference

Michal Vápenka
Goalies
Eduard Lepáček
Referee:
(Canada) Kevin Webinger
Linesmen:
(Netherlands) Louis Beelen
(Canada) Matt Fergenbaum

Krupička (Sedláček, Geier) – 01:23	1–0
Kubeš (Palát, Ohar) – 25:00	2–0
Geier (Doležal, Sedláček) – 39:19	3–0

4 min
Penalties
8 min
19
Shots
7

Quarterfinal

9 March 2022; 20:05	China	4–3 (1–1, 1–0, 2–2)	Czech Republic	Beijing National Indoor Stadium, Beijing

Game reference

Ji Yanzhao
Goalies
Martin Kudela
Referee:
(Norway) Owe Lüthcke
Linesmen:
(Austria) David Nothegger
(Sweden) Tony Rundström

Wang Z. (Cui, Zhu) – 06:48	1–0
	1–1	08:06 – Geier (Hábl, Wagner)
Tian (Cui) – 20:29	2–1
Shen (Cui, Wang Z.) (PP) – 30:29	3–1
	3–2	32:41 – Hečko (Ohar)
	3–3	39:01 – Novotný (Geier, Hábl) (PP)
Wang Z. (Shen) – 43:09	4–3

10 min
Penalties
4 min
16
Shots
12

Fifth place game

11 March 2022; 16:05	Czech Republic	3–4 OT (0–0, 1–1, 2–2) (OT: 0–1)	Italy	Beijing National Indoor Stadium, Beijing

Game reference

Michal Vápenka
Goalies
Julian Kasslatter
Referee:
(United States) Bobby Esposito
Linesmen:
(Netherlands) Louis Beelen
(Serbia) Tibor Fazekaš

	0–1	24:11 – Rosa (Macrì) (PP)
Ohar (Veselý, Palát) (PP) – 27:24	1–1
Novotný (PS) – 37:05	2–1
	2–2	40:48 – Rosa (Larch, Depaoli)
Geier (Novotný, Raul) – 44:15	3–2
	3–3	44:48 – Macrì (Rosa) (EA)
	3–4	51:47 – Depaoli (Macrì)

8 min
Penalties
8 min
19
Shots
18

== See also ==
- Czech Republic at the Paralympics
- Czech Republic at the 2022 Winter Olympics
