= Canada at the 2022 Winter Paralympics =

- Flag of Canada
- IPC code: CAN
- NPC: Canadian Paralympic Committee
- Website: www.paralympic.ca

in Beijing, China 4 March 2022 – 13 March 2022
- Competitors: 48 (35 on foot,13 on wheelchair) in 6 sports
- Flag bearers (opening): Ina Forrest; Greg Westlake
- Flag bearer (closing): Mollie Jepsen
- Medals Ranked 3rd: Gold 8 Silver 6 Bronze 11 Total 25

Winter Paralympics appearances (overview)
- 1976; 1980; 1984; 1988; 1992; 1994; 1998; 2002; 2006; 2010; 2014; 2018; 2022; 2026

Canada competed at the 2022 Winter Paralympics in Beijing, China which took place between 4–13 March 2022.

Para-alpine skier Josh Dueck served as Chef de Mission of the Canadian team and para-alpine skier Karolina Wisniewska was assistant Chef de Mission.

On March 2, 2022, the Canadian Paralympic Committee named wheelchair curler Ina Forrest and para ice hockey player Greg Westlake as Canada's flagbearers during the opening ceremony, the first time that two Canadian athletes will share the role at the Paralympic Games.

== Medallists ==
Medal	Name	Sport	Event	Date
Gold	Mollie Jepsen	Alpine skiing	Women's downhill, standing	March 5
Gold	Brian McKeever; Guide: Russell Kennedy	Cross-country skiing	Men's 20 km classic, visually impaired	March 7
Gold	Tyler Turner	Snowboarding	Men's snowboard cross, SB-LL1	March 7
Gold	Natalie Wilkie	Cross-country skiing	Women's 15 km classical, standing	March 7
Gold	Mark Arendz	Biathlon	Men's 10 km, standing	March 8
Gold	Brian McKeever; Guide: Russell Kennedy	Cross-country skiing	Men's 1.5 km sprint, visually impaired	March 9
Gold	Natalie Wilkie	Cross-country skiing	Women's 1.5 km sprint, standing	March 9
Gold	Brian McKeever; Guide: Graham Nishikawa	Cross-country skiing	Men's 12.5 km free, visually impaired	March 12
Silver	Mac Marcoux; Guide: Tristan Rodgers	Alpine skiing	Men's downhill, visually impaired	March 5
Silver	Lisa DeJong	Snowboarding	Women's snowboard cross, SB-LL2	March 7
Silver	Mark Arendz	Biathlon	Men's 12.5 km, standing	March 11
Silver	Mollie Jepsen	Alpine skiing	Women's giant slalom, standing	March 11
Silver	Natalie Wilkie	Cross-country skiing	Women's 10 km free, standing	March 12
Silver	Canada national para ice hockey team: Dominic Larocque; Adam Kingsmill; Adam Dixon; Zach Lavin; Tyler McGregor; Greg Westlake; Liam Hickey; Tyrone Henry; Rob Armstrong; James Dunn; Ben Delaney; Billy Bridges; Garrett Riley; Anton Jacobs-Webb; Antoine Lehoux; Rod Crane; Branden Sison	Para ice hockey	Open tournament	13 March
Bronze	Mark Arendz	Biathlon	Men's 6 km, standing	March 5
Bronze	Collin Cameron	Cross-country skiing	Men's 15 km, sitting	March 6
Bronze	Alexis Guimond	Alpine skiing	Men's super-G, standing	March 6
Bronze	Alana Ramsay	Alpine skiing	Women's super-G, standing	March 6
Bronze	Brittany Hudak	Cross-country skiing	Women's 15 km classical, standing	March 7
Bronze	Alana Ramsay	Alpine skiing	Women's super combined, standing	March 7
Bronze	Collin Cameron	Cross-country skiing	Men's 1.5 km sprint, sitting	March 9
Bronze	Brittany Hudak	Biathlon	Women's 12.5 km, standing	March 11
Bronze	Tyler Turner	Snowboarding	Men's banked slalom, SB-LL1	March 11
Bronze	Mark Ideson; Ina Forrest; Dennis Thiessen; Jon Thurston; Collinda Joseph	Wheelchair curling	Mixed	March 11
Bronze	Collin Cameron; Emily Young; Mark Arendz; Natalie Wilkie	Cross-country skiing	Mixed 4 × 2.5 kilometre relay	March 13

Medals by sport
Sport	1st place, gold medalist(s)	2nd place, silver medalist(s)	3rd place, bronze medalist(s)	Total
Cross-country skiing	5	1	4	8
Alpine skiing	1	2	3	6
Biathlon	1	1	2	4
Snowboarding	1	1	1	3
Wheelchair curling	0	0	1	1
Para ice hockey	0	1	0	1
Total	8	6	11	25

Medals by date
Day	Date	1st place, gold medalist(s)	2nd place, silver medalist(s)	3rd place, bronze medalist(s)	Total
Day 1	5 March	1	1	1	3
Day 2	6 March	0	0	3	3
Day 3	7 March	3	1	2	6
Day 4	8 March	1	0	0	1
Day 5	9 March	2	0	1	3
Day 6	10 March	0	0	0	0
Day 7	11 March	0	2	3	5
Day 8	12 March	1	1	0	2
Day 9	13 March	0	1	1	2
Total		8	6	11	25

Medals by gender
Gender	1st place, gold medalist(s)	2nd place, silver medalist(s)	3rd place, bronze medalist(s)	Total
Male	5	2	5	8
Female	3	3	4	6
Mixed	0	1	2	3
Total	8	6	11	25

Multiple medalists
Name	Sport	1st place, gold medalist(s)	2nd place, silver medalist(s)	3rd place, bronze medalist(s)	Total
Brian McKeever	Cross-country skiing	3	0	0	3
Natalie Wilkie	Cross-country skiing	2	1	0	3
Mark Arendz	Biathlon	1	1	1	3
Mollie Jepsen	Alpine skiing	1	1	0	2
Tyler Turner	Snowboarding	1	0	1	2
Collin Cameron	Cross-country skiing	0	0	2	2
Brittany Hudak	Biathlon / Cross-country skiing	0	0	2	2
Alana Ramsay	Alpine skiing	0	0	2	2

== Competitors ==
The following is the list of number of competitors participating at the Games per sport/discipline.

Sport	Men	Women	Total
Alpine skiing	6	4	10
Biathlon / Cross-country skiing	7	5	12
Ice Hockey	17	0	17
Snowboarding	2	2	4
Wheelchair curling	3	2	5
Total	35	13	48

== Alpine skiing ==
Canada qualified a total of 11 alpine skiers (six men and five women). The team was officially named on February 18, 2022. Frédérique Turgeon was expected to complete, but withdrew after sustaining a leg injury during training.

Men

Athlete	Event	Run 1		Run 2		Total	
Athlete	Event	Time	Rank	Time	Rank	Time	Rank
Alexis Guimond	Downhill, standing	—N/a				1:16.77	5
Alexis Guimond	Giant slalom, standing	DNF		Did not advance			
Alexis Guimond	Super-G, standing	—N/a				1:10.02	3rd place, bronze medalist(s)
Logan Leach; Guide: Julien Petit	Downhill, visually impaired	—N/a				1:26.28	9
Logan Leach; Guide: Julien Petit	Giant slalom, visually impaired	1:05.85	8	DNF			
Logan Leach; Guide: Julien Petit	Slalom, visually impaired	48.82	6	55.06	6	1:43.88	5
Logan Leach; Guide: Julien Petit	Super combined, visually impaired	1:19.30	8	46.97	5	2:06.27	6
Logan Leach; Guide: Julien Petit	Super-G, visually impaired	—N/a				1:18.38	7
Mac Marcoux; Guide: Tristan Rodgers	Downhill, visually impaired	—N/a				1:13.81	2nd place, silver medalist(s)
Mac Marcoux; Guide: Tristan Rodgers	Slalom, visually impaired	Did not start					
Mac Marcoux; Guide: Tristan Rodgers	Super combined, visually impaired	Did not start					
Mac Marcoux; Guide: Tristan Rodgers	Super-G, visually impaired	—N/a				DNF	
Brian Rowland	Downhill, sitting	—N/a				DSQ	
Brian Rowland	Giant slalom, sitting	1:06.07	12	1:04.15	13	2:10.22	12
Brian Rowland	Slalom, sitting	DNF					
Brian Rowland	Super combined, sitting	Did not start					
Brian Rowland	Super-G, sitting	—N/a				1:16.17	10

Women

Athlete	Event	Run 1		Run 2		Total	
Athlete	Event	Time	Rank	Time	Rank	Time	Rank
Katie Combaluzier	Downhill, sitting	—N/a				DNF	
Katie Combaluzier	Giant slalom, sitting	1:11.57	8	1:16.70	8	2:28.27	8
Katie Combaluzier	Slalom, sitting	1:09.75	6	1:06.63	7	2:16.38	7
Katie Combaluzier	Super combined, sitting	DSQ					
Katie Combaluzier	Super-G, sitting	—N/a				DNF	
Michaela Gosselin	Downhill, standing	—N/a				1:25.75	5
Michaela Gosselin	Giant slalom, standing	1:01.31	8	1:04.86	6	2:06.17	6
Michaela Gosselin	Slalom, standing	51:60	6	55.27	4	1:46.87	4
Michaela Gosselin	Super combined, standing	DSQ					
Michaela Gosselin	Super-G, standing	—N/a				1:19.64	7
Mollie Jepsen	Downhill, standing	—N/a				1:21.75	1st place, gold medalist(s)
Mollie Jepsen	Giant slalom, standing	57.90	3	1:03.05	5	2:00.95	2nd place, silver medalist(s)
Mollie Jepsen	Slalom, standing	Did not start					
Mollie Jepsen	Super combined, standing	1:18.95	5	DNF			
Mollie Jepsen	Super-G, standing	—N/a				1:18.69	6
Alana Ramsay	Downhill, standing	—N/a				1:26.08	7
Alana Ramsay	Giant slalom, standing	DNF					
Alana Ramsay	Slalom, standing	DNF					
Alana Ramsay	Super combined, standing	1:18.71	4	47.62	4	2:06.33	3rd place, bronze medalist(s)
Alana Ramsay	Super-G, standing	—N/a				1:16.84	3rd place, bronze medalist(s)

== Biathlon ==
Canada competed in biathlon.

Men

Athlete	Events	Final		
Athlete	Events	Missed Shots	Result	Rank
Mark Arendz	6 km, standing	2	17:13.6	3rd place, bronze medalist(s)
Mark Arendz	10 km, standing	0	31:45.2	1st place, gold medalist(s)
Mark Arendz	12.5 km, standing	1	40:13.0	2nd place, silver medalist(s)
Collin Cameron	6 km, sitting	3	20:24.7	7
Collin Cameron	12.5 km, sitting	1	40:35.6	4
Derek Zaplotinsky	6 km, sitting	2	21:15.6	14
Derek Zaplotinsky	10 km, sitting	3	32:56.4	8
Derek Zaplotinsky	12.5 km, sitting	1	43:45.2	10

Women

Athlete	Events	Final		
Athlete	Events	Missed Shots	Result	Rank
Brittany Hudak	6 km, standing	1	20:32.4	8
Brittany Hudak	10 km, standing	2	37:43.1	6
Brittany Hudak	12.5 km, standing	2	49:03.4	3rd place, bronze medalist(s)
Christina Picton	6 km, sitting	0	23:50.7	7
Christina Picton	10 km, sitting	3	39:15.9	8
Christina Picton	12.5 km, sitting	0	47:51.9	7
Emily Young	6 km, standing	0	20:31.0	7
Emily Young	10 km, standing	2	39:27.8	8
Emily Young	12.5 km, standing	1	49:55.3	6

== Cross-country skiing ==
Canada qualified a total of 12 cross-country skiers (seven men and five women). The team was officially named on January 27, 2022.

Men

Athlete	Event	Qualification		Semifinal		Final	
Athlete	Event	Result	Rank	Result	Rank	Result	Rank
Mark Arendz	12.5 km free, standing	—N/a				36:23.5	7
Mark Arendz	20 km classic, standing	—N/a				54:43.9	4
Collin Cameron	1.5 km sprint, sitting	2:15.51	2	2:49.2	1	2:46.3	3rd place, bronze medalist(s)
Collin Cameron	10 km, sitting	—N/a				31:47.8	4
Collin Cameron	18 km, sitting	—N/a				47:36.6	3rd place, bronze medalist(s)
Ethan Hess	1.5 km sprint, sitting	2:43.50	26	Did not qualify			
Ethan Hess	10 km, sitting	—N/a				38:16.1	19
Ethan Hess	18 km, sitting	—N/a				54:35.9	18
Brian McKeever; Guide: Russell Kennedy, Graham Nishikawa	1.5 km sprint free, visually impaired	2:37.34	2	3:36.4	2	3:19.5	1st place, gold medalist(s)
Brian McKeever; Guide: Russell Kennedy, Graham Nishikawa	12.5 km free, visually impaired	—N/a				33:06.6	1st place, gold medalist(s)
Brian McKeever; Guide: Russell Kennedy, Graham Nishikawa	20 km classic, visually impaired	—N/a				55:36.7	1st place, gold medalist(s)
Derek Zaplotinsky	1.5 km sprint, sitting	2:25.97	11	3:15.7	6	Did not qualify	
Derek Zaplotinsky	10 km, sitting	—N/a				36:14.9	15
Derek Zaplotinsky	18 km, sitting	—N/a				50:42.6	13

Women

Athlete	Event	Qualification		Semifinal		Final	
Athlete	Event	Result	Rank	Result	Rank	Result	Rank
Brittany Hudak	10 km free, standing	—N/a				43:16.3	7
Brittany Hudak	15 km classic, standing	—N/a				49:27.8	3rd place, bronze medalist(s)
Lyne-Marie Bilodeau	1.5 km sprint, sitting	3:46.30	18	Did not qualify			
Lyne-Marie Bilodeau	7.5 km, sitting	—N/a				34:20.4	13
Lyne-Marie Bilodeau	15 km, sitting	—N/a				59:38.1	9
Christina Picton	1.5 km sprint, sitting	3:03.47	10	3:45.8	3	3:38.6	6
Christina Picton	7.5 km, sitting	—N/a				28:55.6	8
Natalie Wilkie	1.5 km sprint free, standing	3:11.87	1	4:11.0	1	4:05.1	1st place, gold medalist(s)
Natalie Wilkie	10 km free, standing	—N/a				41:45.3	2nd place, silver medalist(s)
Natalie Wilkie	15 km classic, standing	—N/a				48:04.8	1st place, gold medalist(s)
Emily Young	10 km free, standing	—N/a				45:40.1	11
Emily Young	15 km classic, standing	—N/a				52:06.7	5

Relay

Athletes	Event	Final	
Athletes	Event	Time	Rank
Collin Cameron; Emily Young; Mark Arendz; Natalie Wilkie	4 x 2.5 km mixed relay	27:00.6	3rd place, bronze medalist(s)
Brian McKeever; Guide: Russell Kennedy; Brittany Hudak	4 x 2.5 km open relay	30:24.7	6

== Para ice hockey ==
Canada qualified a full team of 17 sled hockey players (five men and five women). The team was officially named on February 15, 2022.

Summary

Team	Event	Preliminary round			Quarterfinal	Semifinal	Final	
Team	Event	Opposition Result	Opposition Result	Rank	Opposition Result	Opposition Result	Opposition Result	Rank
Canada	Mixed tournament	United States; L 0–5	South Korea; W 6–0	2 QS	Bye	South Korea; W 11–0	United States; L 0–5	2nd place, silver medalist(s)

Preliminary round

Pos	Team	Pld	W	OTW	OTL	L	GF	GA	GD	Pts	Qualification
1	United States	2	2	0	0	0	14	1	+13	6	Semifinals
2	Canada	2	1	0	0	1	6	5	+1	3	Semifinals
3	South Korea	2	0	0	0	2	1	15	−14	0	Quarterfinals
−	~~RPC~~	0	0	0	0	0	0	0	0	0	Disqualified

Source: Beijing 2022

5 March 2022; 13:05	United States	5–0 (2–0, 2–0, 1–0)	Canada	Beijing National Indoor Stadium, Beijing

Game reference

Jen Lee
Goalies
Dominic Larocque
Adam Kingsmill
Referee:
(Norway) Owe Lüthcke
Linesmen:
(Sweden) Andreas Lundén
(Sweden) Tony Rundström

Pauls (Farmer, Wallace) (PP) – 05:44	1–0
Roybal (Farmer) – 14:48	2–0
Jones (Wallace, Grove) – 25:27	3–0
Misiewicz (Farmer, Pauls) – 28:57	4–0
Farmer (McKee, Misiewicz) – 41:26	5–0

2 min
Penalties
4 min
26
Shots
9

8 March 2022; 13:05	Canada	6–0 (2–0, 1–0, 3–0)	South Korea	Beijing National Indoor Stadium, Beijing

Game reference

Dominic Larocque
Goalies
Lee Jae-woong
Choi Hyuk-jun
Referee:
(Norway) Kenneth Danielsen
Linesmen:
(Serbia) Tibor Fazekaš
(Austria) David Nothegger

Hickey (Dunn, Bridges) – 07:14	1–0
Dunn (Armstrong) – 07:35	2–0
Dunn (Jacobs-Webb, Riley) – 21:08	3–0
Bridges (Dixon, McGregor) – 34:20	4–0
McGregor – 35:39	5–0
Dunn (Dixon, Bridges) (PP) – 42:50	6–0

29 min
Penalties
10 min
42
Shots
4

Semifinal

11 March 2022; 12:05	Canada	11–0 (3–0, 4–0, 4–0)	South Korea	Beijing National Indoor Stadium, Beijing; Attendance: 943

Game reference

Dominic Larocque
Adam Kingsmill
Goalies
Choi Hyuk-jun
Lee Jae-woong
Referee:
(Denmark) Jacob Grumsen
Linesmen:
(Austria) David Nothegger
(Czech Republic) Jan Vaněk

Hickey (Dixon, McGregor) – 09:48	1–0
Bridges (Delaney) (PP) – 13:37	2–0
McGregor (Hickey, Westlake) – 14:41	3–0
Bridges (Dunn, Dixon) – 15:45	4–0
Bridges (Dunn, Hickey) – 18:11	5–0
McGregor (Hickey) – 19:26	6–0
Westlake (McGregor, Hickey) – 19:57	7–0
McGregor (Westlake, Henry) – 32:15	8–0
Riley – 34:37	9–0
Jacobs-Webb (Dixon, Lehoux) – 37:37	10–0
McGregor (Henry, Lavin) – 44:18	11–0

8 min
Penalties
4 min
43
Shots
3

Final

13 March 2022; 12:05	United States	5–0 (2–0, 2–0, 1–0)	Canada	Beijing National Indoor Stadium, Beijing; Attendance: 1,012

Game reference

Jen Lee
Goalies
Dominic Larocque
Referee:
(Denmark) Jacob Grumsen
Linesmen:
(Sweden) Andreas Lundén
(Czech Republic) Jan Vaněk

Farmer (SH) – 09:08	1–0
Roybal (SH) – 09:33	2–0
Roybal (Woodke) – 17:39	3–0
Pauls (Farmer) – 22:51	4–0
Farmer (Pauls, Roybal) – 35:57	5–0

10 min
Penalties
2 min
20
Shots
16

== Snowboarding ==
Canada qualified a total of four snowboarders (two men and two women). The team was officially named on February 12, 2022.

Banked slalom

Athlete	Event	Run 1	Run 2	Best	Rank
Alex Massie	Men's banked slalom, SB-LL2	1:10.91	1:10.77	1:10.77	6
Tyler Turner	Men's banked slalom, SB-LL1	1:14.00	1:12.84	1:12.84	3rd place, bronze medalist(s)
Lisa DeJong	Women's banked slalom, SB-LL2	1:21.62	1:20.19	1:20.19	8
Sandrine Hamel	Women's banked slalom, SB-LL2	1:23.05	1:22.86	1:22.86	10

Cross

Athlete	Event	Qualification				Quarterfinal	Semifinal	Final	
Athlete	Event	Run 1	Run 2	Best	Seed	Position	Position	Position	Rank
Alex Massie	Men's snowboard cross, SB-LL2	1:02.65	1:03.34	1:02.65	3 Q	1 Q	3 FB	2	6
Tyler Turner	Men's snowboard cross, SB-LL1	1:04.74	1:04.24	1:04.24	1 Q	1 Q	1 FA	1	1st place, gold medalist(s)
Lisa DeJong	Women's snowboard cross, SB-LL2	1:13.25	1:12.22	1:12.22	4 Q	1 Q	2 FA	2	2nd place, silver medalist(s)
Sandrine Hamel	Women's snowboard cross, SB-LL2	1:17.69	1:18.40	1:17.69	8 Q	2 Q	4 FB	4	8

Qualification legend: FA – Qualify to medal round; FB – Qualify to consolation round

== Wheelchair curling ==
Canada has qualified a full team of five curlers. The team was officially named on January 27, 2022.

Summary

Team	Event	Group stage											Semifinal	BM	
Team	Event	Opposition Score	Opposition Score	Opposition Score	Opposition Score	Opposition Score	Opposition Score	Opposition Score	Opposition Score	Opposition Score	Opposition Score	Rank	Opposition Score	Opposition Score	Rank
Mark Ideson; Jon Thurston; Ina Forrest; Dennis Thiessen; Collinda Joseph	Mixed tournament	CHN; W 7–3	SUI; W 8–4	LAT; W 10–3	USA; W 7–4	SWE; L 3–6	KOR; L 4–9	SVK; L 8–9	GBR; W 6–3	EST; W 9–3	NOR; W 7–6	4 Q	CHN; L 5–9	SVK; W 8–3	3rd place, bronze medalist(s)

Round robin Final round-robin standings

Key
Teams to Playoffs

Country	Skip	W	L	W–L	PF	PA	EW	EL	BE	SE	S%	DSC
China	Wang Haitao	8	2	–	68	39	36	28	2	13	71%	122.32
Slovakia	Radoslav Ďuriš	7	3	2–0	65	57	40	33	1	16	65%	95.19
Sweden	Viljo Petersson-Dahl	7	3	1–1	66	52	37	35	3	18	68%	91.08
Canada	Mark Ideson	7	3	0–2	69	50	36	33	2	11	71%	95.29
United States	Matthew Thums	5	5	1–0	60	75	32	39	2	6	60%	70.98
South Korea	Go Seung-nam	5	5	0–1	64	59	35	37	0	11	64%	103.20
Norway	Jostein Stordahl	4	6	2–0	60	64	37	38	2	13	64%	107.82
Great Britain	Hugh Nibloe	4	6	1–1	67	56	37	36	0	16	62%	134.75
Latvia	Poļina Rožkova	4	6	0–2	61	71	40	32	0	18	63%	100.43
Estonia	Andrei Koitmäe	3	7	–	51	69	32	41	2	13	61%	106.21
Switzerland	Laurent Kneubühl	1	9	–	48	87	32	42	0	8	56%	109.27

Wheelchair curling round robin summary table
Pos.	Country	Canada	China	Estonia	Great Britain	Japan	Norway	Slovakia	South Korea	Sweden	Switzerland	United States	Record
4	Canada	—N/a	7–3	9–3	6–3	10–3	7–6	8–9	4–9	3–6	8–4	7–4	7–3
1	China	3–7	—	9–3	6–3	9–2	7–4	7–5	9–4	1–5	7–4	10–2	8–2
10	Estonia	3–9	3–9	—	5–10	6–5	8–3	6–7	2–5	4–6	8–6	6–9	3–7
8	Great Britain	3–6	3–6	10–5	—	8–4	5–7	3–7	6–8	4–6	15–1	10–6	4–6
9	Latvia	3–10	2–9	5–6	4–8	—	6–8	8–4	8–4	9–7	9–7	7–8	4–6
7	Norway	6–7	4–7	3–8	7–5	8–6	—	9–3	4–9	6–8	8–5	5–6	4–6
2	Slovakia	9–8	5–7	7–6	7–3	4–8	3–9	—	7–2	6–5	8–6	9–3	7–3
6	South Korea	9–4	4–9	5–2	8–6	4–8	9–4	2–7	—	10–4	7–8	6–7	5–5
3	Sweden	6–3	5–1	6–4	6–4	7–9	8–6	5–6	4–10	—	9–2	10–7	7–3
11	Switzerland	4–8	4–7	6–8	1–15	7–9	5–8	6–8	8–7	2–9	—	5–8	1–9
5	United States	4–7	2–10	9–6	6–10	8–7	6–5	3–9	7–6	7–10	8–5	—	5–5

Draw 1
Saturday, March 5, 14:35

Sheet B	1	2	3	4	5	6	7	8	Final
China (Wang) 🔨	1	0	1	0	0	1	0	X	3
Canada (Ideson)	0	1	0	3	1	0	2	X	7

Draw 2
Saturday, March 5, 19:35

Sheet D	1	2	3	4	5	6	7	8	Final
Canada (Ideson) 🔨	0	3	0	0	3	0	2	X	8
Switzerland (Kneubühl)	0	0	1	1	0	2	0	X	4

Draw 4
Sunday, March 6, 14:35

Sheet C	1	2	3	4	5	6	7	8	Final
Canada (Ideson) 🔨	4	0	0	2	4	0	X	X	10
Latvia (Rožkova)	0	1	1	0	0	1	X	X	3

Draw 6
Monday, March 7, 9:35

Sheet A	1	2	3	4	5	6	7	8	Final
United States (Thums)	0	0	1	0	0	1	2	X	4
Canada (Ideson) 🔨	2	0	0	3	2	0	0	X	7

Draw 8
Monday, March 7, 19:35

Sheet C	1	2	3	4	5	6	7	8	Final
Sweden (Petersson-Dahl)	1	0	2	2	0	0	1	X	6
Canada (Ideson) 🔨	0	1	0	0	1	1	0	X	3

Draw 9
Tuesday, March 8, 9:35

Sheet D	1	2	3	4	5	6	7	8	Final
South Korea (Baek)	0	1	1	2	0	4	0	1	9
Canada (Ideson) 🔨	0	0	0	0	2	0	2	0	4

Draw 11
Tuesday, March 8, 19:35

Sheet B	1	2	3	4	5	6	7	8	Final
Canada (Ideson)	1	1	0	1	0	4	0	1	8
Slovakia (Ďuriš) 🔨	0	0	2	0	4	0	3	0	9

Draw 13
Wednesday, March 9, 14:35

Sheet D	1	2	3	4	5	6	7	8	Final
Canada (Ideson) 🔨	0	0	1	1	0	2	2	X	6
Great Britain (Nibloe)	1	1	0	0	1	0	0	X	3

Draw 14
Wednesday, March 9, 19:35

Sheet B	1	2	3	4	5	6	7	8	Final
Estonia (Koitmäe) 🔨	0	2	0	1	0	0	0	X	3
Canada (Ideson)	1	0	3	0	1	2	2	X	9

Draw 15
Thursday, March 10, 9:35

Sheet A	1	2	3	4	5	6	7	8	Final
Canada (Ideson)	0	1	0	1	0	2	0	3	7
Norway (Syversen) 🔨	1	0	1	0	3	0	1	0	6

Semifinal
Friday, March 11, 14:35

Sheet C	1	2	3	4	5	6	7	8	Final
China (Wang) 🔨	1	0	3	0	3	2	0	X	9
Canada (Ideson)	0	1	0	2	0	0	2	X	5

Bronze match
Friday, March 11, 19:35

Sheet B	1	2	3	4	5	6	7	8	Final
Canada (Ideson)	1	1	0	0	1	1	0	4	8
Slovakia (Ďuriš) 🔨	0	0	0	2	0	0	1	0	3

== See also ==
- Canada at the Paralympics
- Canada at the 2022 Winter Olympics
