= United States at the 2022 Winter Paralympics =

- Flag of the United States
- IPC code: USA
- NPC: United States Olympic & Paralympic Committee
- Website: www.teamusa.org/US-Paralympics

in Beijing, China 4 March 2022 – 13 March 2022
- Competitors: 65 (50 men and 15 women) in 6 sports
- Flag bearers (opening): Tyler Carter; Danelle Umstead
- Flag bearer (closing): Keith Gabel
- Medals Ranked 5th: Gold 6 Silver 11 Bronze 3 Total 20

Winter Paralympics appearances (overview)
- 1976; 1980; 1984; 1988; 1992; 1994; 1998; 2002; 2006; 2010; 2014; 2018; 2022; 2026

The United States competed at the 2022 Winter Paralympics in Beijing, China which took place between 4–13 March 2022. In total, 65 athletes competed in six sports. It was the second largest delegation at the Games after the host China. Para ice hockey is represented by the most athletes, with 17.

Julie Dussliere served as the team's Chef de Mission. Tyler Carter and Danelle Umstead served as flag bearers during the opening ceremony. Keith Gabel was the flag bearer during the closing ceremony.

== Medalists ==
The following U.S. competitors won medals at the games. In the by discipline sections below, medalists' names are bolded.

Medals by sport
Sport	1st place, gold medalist(s)	2nd place, silver medalist(s)	3rd place, bronze medalist(s)	Total
Biathlon	3	2	1	**6**
Cross-country skiing	1	6	1	**8**
Snowboarding	1	2	1	**4**
Para ice hockey	1	0	0	**1**
Alpine skiing	0	1	0	**1**
Total	6	11	3	20

Medals by date
Day	Date	1st place, gold medalist(s)	2nd place, silver medalist(s)	3rd place, bronze medalist(s)	Total
1	March 5	1	0	1	**2**
2	March 6	0	1	0	**1**
3	March 7	0	4	1	**5**
4	March 8	1	1	0	**2**
5	March 9	0	2	1	**3**
6	March 10	0	1	0	**1**
7	March 11	2	1	0	**3**
8	March 12	0	1	0	**1**
9	March 13	2	0	0	**2**
Total		6	11	3	20

Medals by gender
Gender	1st place, gold medalist(s)	2nd place, silver medalist(s)	3rd place, bronze medalist(s)	Total	Percentage
Male	1	5	0	**6**	30.0%
Female	4	6	3	**13**	65.0%
Mixed	1	0	0	**1**	5.0%
Total	6	11	3	20	100%

Multiple medalists
**Name**	**Sport**	1st place, gold medalist(s)	2nd place, silver medalist(s)	3rd place, bronze medalist(s)	Total
Oksana Masters	Biathlon / Cross-country skiing	3	4	0	7
Jake Adicoff	Cross-country skiing	1	2	0	3
Sam Wood	Cross-country skiing	1	2	0	3
Kendall Gretsch	Biathlon	1	1	1	3
Sydney Peterson	Cross-country skiing	1	1	1	3
Brenna Huckaby	Snowboarding	1	0	1	2

Medal	Name	Sport	Event	Date
Gold	Oksana Masters	Biathlon	Women's 6 km, sitting	March 5
Gold	Kendall Gretsch	Biathlon	Women's 10 km, sitting	March 8
Gold	Oksana Masters	Biathlon	Women's 12.5 km, sitting	March 11
Gold	Brenna Huckaby	Snowboarding	Women's banked slalom, SB-LL2	March 11
Gold	Jake Adicoff; Oksana Masters; Dan Cnossen; Sydney Peterson; Guide: Sam Wood	Cross-country skiing	Mixed 4 × 2.5 km relay	March 13
Gold	United States men's national ice sledge hockey team: Ralph DeQuebec; Travis Dodson; David Eustace; Declan Farmer; Noah Grove; Malik Jones; Griffin LaMarre; Jen Lee; Kevin McKee; Josh Misiewicz; Evan Nichols; Josh Pauls; Rico Roman; Brody Roybal; Jack Wallace; Joseph Woodke; Kyle Zych	Para ice hockey	Open tournament	March 13
Silver	Oksana Masters	Cross-country skiing	Women's 12 km, sitting	March 6
Silver	Jake Adicoff; Guide: Sam Wood	Cross-country skiing	Men's 20 km classical, visually impaired	March 7
Silver	Sydney Peterson	Cross-country skiing	Women's 15 km classical, standing	March 7
Silver	Garrett Geros	Snowboarding	Men's snowboard cross, SB-LL1	March 7
Silver	Mike Schultz	Snowboarding	Men's snowboard cross, SB-LL2	March 7
Silver	Oksana Masters	Biathlon	Women's 10 km, sitting	March 8
Silver	Jake Adicoff; Guide: Sam Wood	Cross-country skiing	Men's sprint, visually impaired	March 9
Silver	Oksana Masters	Cross-country skiing	Women's sprint, sitting	March 9
Silver	Thomas Walsh	Alpine skiing	Men's giant slalom, standing	March 10
Silver	Kendall Gretsch	Biathlon	Women's 12.5 km, sitting	March 11
Silver	Oksana Masters	Cross-country skiing	Women's 7.5 km sitting	March 12
Bronze	Kendall Gretsch	Biathlon	Women's 6 km, sitting	March 5
Bronze	Brenna Huckaby	Snowboarding	Women's snowboard cross, SB-LL2	March 7
Bronze	Sydney Peterson	Cross-country skiing	Women's sprint, standing	March 9

== Competitors ==
The following is the list of number of competitors participating at the Games per sport/discipline.

Sport	Men	Women	Total
Alpine skiing	13	3	16
Biathlon	8	7	15
Cross-country skiing	8	7	15
Para ice hockey	17	0	17
Snowboarding	9	3	12
Wheelchair curling	3	2	5
Total	50	15	65

== Alpine skiing ==
United States competed in alpine skiing.

Men

Athlete	Event	Classification	Run 1		Run 2		Total	
Athlete	Event	Classification	Time	Rank	Time	Rank	Time	Rank
Ravi Drugan	Downhill, sitting	LW12-2	—N/a				DNF	
Andrew Kurka	Downhill, sitting	LW12-1	—N/a				1:18.37	4
Tyler Carter	Downhill, standing	LW4	—N/a				1:28.78	31
Andrew Haraghey	Downhill, standing	LW1	—N/a				1:20.25	15
Connor Hogan	Downhill, standing	LW9-1	—N/a				1:23.89	28
Jesse Keefe	Downhill, standing	LW4	—N/a				1:22.48	22
Spencer Wood	Downhill, standing	LW9-2	—N/a				1:20.55	16
Ravi Drugan	Super-G, sitting	LW12-2	—N/a				1:18.79	17
David Williams	Super-G, sitting	LW11	—N/a				DNF	
Tyler Carter	Super-G, standing	LW4	—N/a				DNF	
Andrew Haraghey	Super-G, standing	LW1	—N/a				1:14.67	17
Connor Hogan	Super-G, standing	LW9-1	—N/a				DNF	
Thomas Walsh	Super-G, standing	LW4	—N/a				1:14.55	15
Spencer Wood	Super-G, standing	LW9-2	—N/a				1:13.97	12
Ravi Drugan	Combined, sitting	LW12-2	1:19.91	18	DNF			
Tyler Carter	Combined, standing	LW4	1:22.71	29	DNF			
Andrew Haraghey	Combined, standing	LW1	DNF					
Jesse Keefe	Combined, standing	LW4	1:16.81	20	44.93	13	2:01.74	15
Thomas Walsh	Combined, standing	LW4	1:13.94	8	40.94	4	1:54.88	4
Spencer Wood	Combined, standing	LW9-2	1:14.88	12	45.22	15	2:00.10	14
Jasmin Bambur	Giant slalom, sitting	LW11	1:07.80	20	1:04.23	14	2:12.03	16
Matthew Brewer	Giant slalom, sitting	LW12-2	1:10.62	26	1:08.82	26	2:19.44	25
Ravi Drugan	Giant slalom, sitting	LW12-2	1:11.26	28	1:03.54	11	2:14.80	20
Robert Enigl	Giant slalom, sitting	LW12-1	1:08.72	22	1:06.28	22	2:15.00	21
David Williams	Giant slalom, sitting	LW11	DNF					
Tyler Carter	Giant slalom, standing	LW4	1:13.32	34	1:11.60	33	2:24.29	33
Patrick Halgren	Giant slalom, standing	LW2	1:07.14	26	1:04.90	26	2:12.04	26
Andrew Haraghey	Giant slalom, standing	LW1	1:08.19	28	1:06.14	29	2:14.33	28
Jesse Keefe	Giant slalom, standing	LW4	1:03.06	15	1:01.48	15	2:04.54	15
Thomas Walsh	Giant slalom, standing	LW4	57.60	1	57.84	5	1:55.44	2nd place, silver medalist(s)
Jasmin Bambur	Slalom, sitting	LW11	51.74	14	55.16	4	1:46.90	8
Matthew Brewer	Slalom, sitting	LW12-2	54.96	19	1:00.52	12	1:55.48	12
Ravi Drugan	Slalom, sitting	LW12-2	50.63	12	1:00.36	11	1:50.99	10
Robert Enigl	Slalom, sitting	LW12-1	51.87	15	1:19.82	15	2:11.69	15
Kyle Taulman	Slalom, sitting	LW11	DNF					
Patrick Halgren	Slalom, standing	LW2	51.83	30	1:11.19	26	2:03.02	24
Andrew Haraghey	Slalom, standing	LW1	47.60	13	DNF			
Jesse Keefe	Slalom, standing	LW4	47.81	14	56.61	15	1:44.42	9
Thomas Walsh	Slalom, standing	LW4	45.04	7	53.66	6	1:38.70	6
Spencer Wood	Slalom, standing	LW9-2	49.75	21	55.93	12	1:45.68	14

Women

Athlete	Event	Classification	Run 1		Run 2		Total	
Athlete	Event	Classification	Time	Rank	Time	Rank	Time	Rank
Laurie Stephens	Downhill, sitting	LW12-1	—N/a				DNF	
Allie Johnson	Super-G, standing	LW6/8-1	—N/a				1:39.50	14
Allie Johnson	Combined, standing	LW6/8-1	1:37.51	10	DNF			
Allie Johnson	Giant slalom, standing	LW6/8-1	1:10.37	15	1:15.38	12	2:25.75	12
Danelle Umstead; Guide: Rob Umstead	Giant slalom, visually impaired	B2	1:15.62	13	1:18.62	13	2:34.24	13
Allie Johnson	Slalom, standing	LW6/8-1	DNF					
Danelle Umstead; Guide: Rob Umstead	Slalom, visually impaired	B2	DNF					

== Biathlon ==
United States competed in biathlon.

Men

Athlete	Event	Classification	Factor	Time	Misses	Factored time	Rank
Daniel Cnossen	6 km, sitting	LW12	100%	19:54.2	0	—N/a	4
Aaron Pike	6 km, sitting	LW11.5	96%	21:16.0	1	20:25.0	8
Ruslan Reiter	6 km, standing	LW8	96%	20:07.8	1	19:19.5	12
Drew Shea	6 km, standing	LW8	96%	21:03.0	0	20:12.5	14
Daniel Cnossen	10 km, sitting	LW12	100%	34:10.0	4	—N/a	12
Aaron Pike	10 km, sitting	LW11.5	96%	38:21.5	6	36:49.4	15
Ruslan Reiter	10 km, standing	LW8	96%	39:42.0	3	38:06.7	12
Drew Shea	10 km, standing	LW8	96%	40:50.5	1	39:12.5	13
Daniel Cnossen	12.5 km, sitting	LW12	100%	42:46.9	1	—N/a	7
Aaron Pike	12.5 km, sitting	LW11.5	96%	45:07.3	2	43:19.0	9

Women

Athlete	Event	Classification	Factor	Time	Misses	Factored time	Rank
Lera Doederlein	6 km, sitting	LW12	100%	27:26.9	2	—N/a	9
Kendall Gretsch	6 km, sitting	LW11.5	96%	22:47.6	1	21:52.9	3rd place, bronze medalist(s)
Oksana Masters	6 km, sitting	LW12	100%	20:51.2	0	—N/a	1st place, gold medalist(s)
Dani Aravich	6 km, standing	LW8	96%	23:12.6	3	22:16.9	13
Lera Doederlein	10 km, sitting	LW12	100%	43:52.3	2	—N/a	9
Kendall Gretsch	10 km, sitting	LW11.5	96%	34:44.4	0	33:21.0	2nd place, silver medalist(s)
Oksana Masters	10 km, sitting	LW12	100%	33:12.3	1	—N/a	1st place, gold medalist(s)
Dani Aravich	10 km, standing	LW8	96%	44:37.5	8	42:50.4	11
Kendall Gretsch	12.5 km, sitting	LW11.5	96%	44:09.7	0	42:23.7	2nd place, silver medalist(s)
Oksana Masters	12.5 km, sitting	LW12	100%	42:17.9	1	—N/a	1st place, gold medalist(s)

== Cross-country skiing ==
United States competed in cross-country skiing.

Distance
Men

Athlete	Event	Classification	Factor	Time	Factored time	Rank
Aaron Pike	10 km, sitting	LW11.5	96%	37:14.4	35:45.0	12
Josh Sweeney	10 km, sitting	LW12	100%	39:41.7	—N/a	24
Ruslan Reiter	12.5 km freestyle, standing	LW8	96%	40:44.5	39:06.7	10
Drew Shea	12.5 km freestyle, standing	LW8	96%	45:45.7	43:55.9	19
Jake Adicoff; Guide: Sam Wood	12.5 km freestyle, visually impaired	B3	100%	34:57.6	—N/a	6
Max Nelson; Guide: S. Hamilton	12.5 km freestyle, visually impaired	B3	100%	39:27.3	—N/a	13
Daniel Cnossen	15 km, sitting	LW12	100%	49:22.7	—N/a	6
Josh Sweeney	15 km, sitting	LW12	100%	54:07.7	—N/a	16
Jake Adicoff; Guide: Sam Wood	20 km classical, visually impaired	B3	100%	58:54.4	—N/a	2nd place, silver medalist(s)

Women

Athlete	Event	Classification	Factor	Time	Factored time	Rank
Lera Doederlein	7.5 km, sitting	LW12	100%	35:27.8	—N/a	14
Kendall Gretsch	7.5 km, sitting	LW11.5	96%	28:57.3	27:47.8	6
Erin Martin	7.5 km, sitting	LW10	86%	41:37.1	35:47.5	15
Oksana Masters	7.5 km, sitting	LW12	100%	25:24.7	—N/a	2nd place, silver medalist(s)
Dani Aravich	10 km freestyle, standing	LW8	96%	47:05.2	45:12.2	9
Grace Miller	10 km freestyle, standing	LW8	96%	59:29.3	57:06.5	16
Sydney Peterson	10 km freestyle, standing	LW9	89%	47:30.8	42:17.2	6
Kendall Gretsch	15 km, sitting	LW11.5	96%	48:22.3	46:26.2	4
Oksana Masters	15 km, sitting	LW12	100%	43:38.8	—N/a	2nd place, silver medalist(s)
Grace Miller	15 km classical, standing	LW8	92%	1:07:47.8	1:02:22.4	9
Sydney Peterson	15 km classical, standing	LW9	88%	55:41.1	49:00.2	2nd place, silver medalist(s)

Mixed/Open

Athlete	Event	Total factor	Time	Factored time	Rank
Jake Adicoff; Guide: Sam Wood; Daniel Cnossen; Oksana Masters; Sydney Peterson	Mixed 4 × 2.5 km relay	335%	31:56.1	25:59.3	1st place, gold medalist(s)
Kendall Gretsch; Max Nelson; Guide: S.Hamilton; Ruslan Reiter; Drew Shea	Open 4 × 2.5 km relay	361%	37:37.9	33:03.0	9

Sprint
Men

Athlete	Event	Classification	Factor	Qualification			Semifinal			Final		
Athlete	Event	Classification	Factor	Time	Factored time	Rank	Time	Factored time	Rank	Time	Factored time	Rank
Daniel Cnossen	Sprint, sitting	LW12	100%	2:27.26	—N/a	13	Did not advance					
Aaron Pike	Sprint, sitting	LW11.5	96%	2:33.13	2:27.00	12 Q	3:09.9	3:02.3	6	Did not advance		12
Josh Sweeney	Sprint, sitting	LW12	100%	2:34.22	—N/a	19	Did not advance					
Ruslan Reiter	Sprint, standing	LW8	96%	3:01.76	2:54.49	9 Q	3:52.40	3:43.1	6	Did not advance		12
Drew Shea	Sprint, standing	LW8	96%	3:20.79	3:12.76	21	Did not advance					
Jake Adicoff; Guide: Sam Wood	Sprint, visually impaired	B3	100%	2:36.72	—N/a	1 Q	3:44.4	—N/a	1 Q	3:20.3	—N/a	2nd place, silver medalist(s)
Max Nelson; Guide: S. Hamilton	Sprint, visually impaired	B3	100%	3:00.26	—N/a	14	Did not advance					

Women

Athlete	Event	Classification	Factor	Qualification			Semifinal			Final		
Athlete	Event	Classification	Factor	Time	Factored time	Rank	Time	Factored time	Rank	Time	Factored time	Rank
Lera Doederlein	Sprint, sitting	LW12	100%	3:15.62	—N/a	14	Did not advance					
Kendall Gretsch	Sprint, sitting	LW11.5	96%	2:54.70	2:47.71	4 Q	3:43.4	3:34.5	2 Q	3:46.4	3:37.3	5
Erin Martin	Sprint, sitting	LW10	86%	4:01.10	3:27.35	16	Did not advance					
Oksana Masters	Sprint, sitting	LW12	100%	2:42.54	—N/a	1 Q	3:26.2	—N/a	1 Q	3:19.9	—N/a	2nd place, silver medalist(s)
Dani Aravich	Sprint, standing	LW8	96%	3:33.99	3:25.43	8 Q	4:42.9	4:31.6	4	Did not advance		8
Grace Miller	Sprint, standing	LW8	96%	4:03.93	3:54.17	14	Did not advance					
Sydney Peterson	Sprint, standing	LW9	89%	3:40.93	3:16.63	3 Q	4:59.0	4:26.1	2 Q	4:43.3	4:12.1	3rd place, bronze medalist(s)

== Para ice hockey ==
The United States competed in para ice hockey.

Summary

Team	Event	Preliminary round			Quarterfinal	Semifinal	Final / BM	
Team	Event	Opposition Result	Opposition Result	Rank	Opposition Result	Opposition Result	Opposition Result	Rank
United States national team	Open tournament	Canada; W 5–0	South Korea; W 9–1	1 QS	Bye	China; W 11–0	Canada; W 5–0	1st place, gold medalist(s)

Team USA was supposed to face the Russian Paralympic Committee (then renamed Neutral Paralympic Athletes after the invasion of Ukraine) before the Russian team was banned.

Preliminary round

Pos	Team	Pld	W	OTW	OTL	L	GF	GA	GD	Pts	Qualification
1	United States	2	2	0	0	0	14	1	+13	6	Semifinals
2	Canada	2	1	0	0	1	6	5	+1	3	Semifinals
3	South Korea	2	0	0	0	2	1	15	−14	0	Quarterfinals
−	~~RPC~~	0	0	0	0	0	0	0	0	0	Disqualified

Source: Beijing 2022

5 March 2022; 13:05	United States	5–0 (2–0, 2–0, 1–0)	Canada	Beijing National Indoor Stadium, Beijing

Game reference

Jen Lee
Goalies
Dominic Larocque
Adam Kingsmill
Referee:
(Norway) Owe Lüthcke
Linesmen:
(Sweden) Andreas Lundén
(Sweden) Tony Rundström

Pauls (Farmer, Wallace) (PP) – 05:44	1–0
Roybal (Farmer) – 14:48	2–0
Jones (Wallace, Grove) – 25:27	3–0
Misiewicz (Farmer, Pauls) – 28:57	4–0
Farmer (McKee, Misiewicz) – 41:26	5–0

2 min
Penalties
4 min
26
Shots
9

6 March 2022; 13:05	South Korea	1–9 (0–5, 0–4, 1–0)	United States	Beijing National Indoor Stadium, Beijing

Game reference

Lee Jae-woong
Choi Hyuk-jun
Goalies
Jen Lee
Griffin LaMarre
Referee:
(Denmark) Jacob Grumsen
Linesmen:
(Netherlands) Louis Beelen
(Canada) Matt Fergenbaum

	0–1	04:25 – Wallace (Misiewicz, Nichols)
	0–2	08:58 – Wallace (Dodson)
	0–3	09:43 – Misiewicz (Farmer, Nichols)
	0–4	11:03 – Roybal (Farmer, Wallace)
	0–5	13:53 – Wallace (Misiewicz, Pauls)
	0–6	24:56 – Jones (Zych, DeQuebec)
	0–7	26:51 – Farmer (Misiewicz, Pauls) (PP)
	0–8	28:27 – Farmer (Roybal, Pauls) (PP)
	0–9	29:47 – Jones (Nichols, Farmer) (PP)
Jung – 33:21	1–9

10 min
Penalties
2 min
3
Shots
39

Semifinal

11 March 2022; 20:05	United States	11–0 (4–0, 5–0, 2–0)	China	Beijing National Indoor Stadium, Beijing; Attendance: 987

Game reference

Jen Lee
Goalies
Ji Yanzhao
Wang Wei
Referee:
(Canada) Kevin Webinger
Linesmen:
(Canada) Matt Fergenbaum
(Sweden) Andreas Lundén

Roybal (Farmer) – 05:23	1–0
Roybal (Farmer) – 05:55	2–0
Misiewicz (Farmer, Zych) – 08:45	3–0
Roybal (Farmer, Misiewicz) (PP) – 14:05	4–0
Misiewicz (Pauls) – 17:59	5–0
Farmer (Misiewicz, Roybal) (PP) – 19:47	6–0
Jones (Wallace, Roybal) (PP) – 22:31	7–0
Farmer (Zych) – 23:13	8–0
Woodke (Zych, Wallace) (PP) – 27:40	9–0
Roybal (Wallace, Jones) – 31:57	10–0
Pauls – 33:02	11–0

6 min
Penalties
12 min
37
Shots
6

Gold medal game

13 March 2022; 12:05	United States	5–0 (2–0, 2–0, 1–0)	Canada	Beijing National Indoor Stadium, Beijing; Attendance: 1,012

Game reference

Jen Lee
Goalies
Dominic Larocque
Referee:
(Denmark) Jacob Grumsen
Linesmen:
(Sweden) Andreas Lundén
(Czech Republic) Jan Vaněk

Farmer (SH) – 09:08	1–0
Roybal (SH) – 09:33	2–0
Roybal (Woodke) – 17:39	3–0
Pauls (Farmer) – 22:51	4–0
Farmer (Pauls, Roybal) – 35:57	5–0

10 min
Penalties
2 min
20
Shots
16

== Snowboarding ==
United States competed in snowboarding.

Slalom
Men

Athlete	Event	Run 1	Run 2	Best	Rank
Tyler Burdick	Banked slalom, SB-LL1	1:23.53	1:22.94	1:22.94	14
Noah Elliott	Banked slalom, SB-LL1	1:13.06	1:12.87	1:12.87	4
Mike Schultz	Banked slalom, SB-LL1	1:13.64	1:12.89	1:12.89	5
Keith Gabel	Banked slalom, SB-LL2	1:10.92	1:11.58	1:10.92	7
Zachary Miller	Banked slalom, SB-LL2	1:14.47	1:14.11	1:14.11	15
Evan Strong	Banked slalom, SB-LL2	1:10.74	1:11.84	1:10.74	5
Mike Minor	Banked slalom, SB-UL	1:12.16	1:12.15	1:12.15	8
Michael Spivey	Banked slalom, SB-UL	1:17.94	1:17.75	1:17.75	15

Women

Athlete	Event	Run 1	Run 2	Best	Rank
Brittani Coury	Banked slalom, SB-LL2	1:51.34	1:22.30	1:22.30	9
Brenna Huckaby	Banked slalom, SB-LL2	1:18.13	1:17.28	1:17.28	1st place, gold medalist(s)
Katlyn Maddry	Banked slalom, SB-LL2	DNS			

Snowboard cross
Men

Athlete	Event	Seeding		Quarterfinal	Semifinal	Final	
Athlete	Event	Time	Rank	Position	Position	Position	Rank
Noah Elliott	Snowboard cross, SB-LL1	1:07.32	5	2 Q	3 FB	2	6
Mike Schultz	Snowboard cross, SB-LL1	1:05.73	3	1 Q	1 FA	2	2nd place, silver medalist(s)
Keith Gabel	Snowboard cross, SB-LL2	1:02.83	5 Q	1 Q	3 FB	3	7
Garrett Geros	Snowboard cross, SB-LL2	1:02.46	2 Q	1 Q	2 FA	2	2nd place, silver medalist(s)
Zachary Miller	Snowboard cross, SB-LL2	1:07.11	15 Q	3	Did not advance		15
Mike Minor	Snowboard cross, SB-UL	1:03.96	8 Q	3	Did not advance		11
Michael Spivey	Snowboard cross, SB-UL	1:12.06	17	Did not advance			

Qualification legend: Q - Qualify to next round; FA - Qualify to medal final; FB - Qualify to consolation final

Women

Athlete	Event	Seeding		Quarterfinal	Semifinal	Final	
Athlete	Event	Time	Rank	Position	Position	Position	Rank
Brittani Coury	Snowboard cross, SB-LL2	1:13.04	5	2 Q	3 FB	1	5
Brenna Huckaby	Snowboard cross, SB-LL2	1:11.13	2	1 Q	2 FA	3	3rd place, bronze medalist(s)
Katlyn Maddry	Snowboard cross, SB-LL2	1:27.63	13	3	Did not advance		13

Qualification legend: Q - Qualify to next round; FA - Qualify to medal final; FB - Qualify to consolation final

== Wheelchair curling ==
United States competed in wheelchair curling.

Summary

Athlete	Event	Round robin											Semifinal	Final / BM	
Athlete	Event	Opposition Result	Opposition Result	Opposition Result	Opposition Result	Opposition Result	Opposition Result	Opposition Result	Opposition Result	Opposition Result	Opposition Result	Rank	Opposition Result	Opposition Result	Rank
Matthew Thums; Stephen Emt; David Samsa; Oyuna Uranchimeg; Pamela Wilson	Mixed tournament	SVK; L 3–9	GBR; L 6–10	EST; W 9–6	CAN; L 4–7	NOR; W 6–5	CHN; L 2–10	SUI; W 8–5	LAT; W 8–7	SWE; L 7–10	KOR; W 7–6	5	Did not advance		

Round robin Final round-robin standings

Key
Teams to Playoffs

Country	Skip	W	L	W–L	PF	PA	EW	EL	BE	SE	S%	DSC
China	Wang Haitao	8	2	–	68	39	36	28	2	13	71%	122.32
Slovakia	Radoslav Ďuriš	7	3	2–0	65	57	40	33	1	16	65%	95.19
Sweden	Viljo Petersson-Dahl	7	3	1–1	66	52	37	35	3	18	68%	91.08
Canada	Mark Ideson	7	3	0–2	69	50	36	33	2	11	71%	95.29
United States	Matthew Thums	5	5	1–0	60	75	32	39	2	6	60%	70.98
South Korea	Go Seung-nam	5	5	0–1	64	59	35	37	0	11	64%	103.20
Norway	Jostein Stordahl	4	6	2–0	60	64	37	38	2	13	64%	107.82
Great Britain	Hugh Nibloe	4	6	1–1	67	56	37	36	0	16	62%	134.75
Latvia	Poļina Rožkova	4	6	0–2	61	71	40	32	0	18	63%	100.43
Estonia	Andrei Koitmäe	3	7	–	51	69	32	41	2	13	61%	106.21
Switzerland	Laurent Kneubühl	1	9	–	48	87	32	42	0	8	56%	109.27

Wheelchair curling round robin summary table
Pos.	Country	Canada	China	Estonia	Great Britain	Japan	Norway	Slovakia	South Korea	Sweden	Switzerland	United States	Record
4	Canada	—N/a	7–3	9–3	6–3	10–3	7–6	8–9	4–9	3–6	8–4	7–4	7–3
1	China	3–7	—	9–3	6–3	9–2	7–4	7–5	9–4	1–5	7–4	10–2	8–2
10	Estonia	3–9	3–9	—	5–10	6–5	8–3	6–7	2–5	4–6	8–6	6–9	3–7
8	Great Britain	3–6	3–6	10–5	—	8–4	5–7	3–7	6–8	4–6	15–1	10–6	4–6
9	Latvia	3–10	2–9	5–6	4–8	—	6–8	8–4	8–4	9–7	9–7	7–8	4–6
7	Norway	6–7	4–7	3–8	7–5	8–6	—	9–3	4–9	6–8	8–5	5–6	4–6
2	Slovakia	9–8	5–7	7–6	7–3	4–8	3–9	—	7–2	6–5	8–6	9–3	7–3
6	South Korea	9–4	4–9	5–2	8–6	4–8	9–4	2–7	—	10–4	7–8	6–7	5–5
3	Sweden	6–3	5–1	6–4	6–4	7–9	8–6	5–6	4–10	—	9–2	10–7	7–3
11	Switzerland	4–8	4–7	6–8	1–15	7–9	5–8	6–8	8–7	2–9	—	5–8	1–9
5	United States	4–7	2–10	9–6	6–10	8–7	6–5	3–9	7–6	7–10	8–5	—	5–5

Draw 1
Saturday, March 5, 14:35

Sheet C	1	2	3	4	5	6	7	8	Final
Slovakia (Ďuriš) 🔨	2	4	0	1	0	1	1	X	9
United States (Thums)	0	0	1	0	2	0	0	X	3

Draw 2
Saturday, March 5, 19:35

Sheet B	1	2	3	4	5	6	7	8	Final
United States (Thums) 🔨	2	1	0	2	0	1	0	0	6
Great Britain (Nibloe)	0	0	3	0	2	0	2	3	10

Draw 4
Sunday, March 6, 14:35

Sheet D	1	2	3	4	5	6	7	8	Final
Estonia (Koitmäe)	1	0	0	2	0	1	2	0	6
United States (Thums) 🔨	0	3	0	0	4	0	0	2	9

Draw 6
Monday, March 7, 9:35

Sheet A	1	2	3	4	5	6	7	8	Final
United States (Thums)	0	0	1	0	0	1	2	X	4
Canada (Ideson) 🔨	2	0	0	3	2	0	0	X	7

Draw 8
Monday, March 7, 19:35

Sheet D	1	2	3	4	5	6	7	8	Final
United States (Thums)	1	0	0	0	1	0	2	2	6
Norway (Syversen) 🔨	0	2	1	1	0	1	0	0	5

Draw 11
Tuesday, March 8, 19:35

Sheet C	1	2	3	4	5	6	7	8	Final
China (Wang)	0	5	0	3	2	0	X	X	10
United States (Thums) 🔨	0	0	1	0	0	1	X	X	2

Draw 13
Wednesday, March 9, 14:35

Sheet B	1	2	3	4	5	6	7	8	Final
United States (Thums) 🔨	1	3	0	0	1	0	0	3	8
Switzerland (Kneubühl)	0	0	2	1	0	1	1	0	5

Draw 14
Wednesday, March 9, 19:35

Sheet C	1	2	3	4	5	6	7	8	Final
United States (Thums) 🔨	0	2	0	4	0	2	0	0	8
Latvia (Rožkova)	1	0	1	0	3	0	1	1	7

Draw 15
Thursday, March 10, 9:35

Sheet D	1	2	3	4	5	6	7	8	Final
Sweden (Petersson-Dahl)	0	0	3	2	0	0	5	X	10
United States (Thums) 🔨	2	0	0	0	4	1	0	X	7

Draw 16
Thursday, March 10, 14:35

Sheet D	1	2	3	4	5	6	7	8	Final
South Korea (Jang)	1	0	2	0	2	0	1	0	6
United States (Thums) 🔨	0	2	0	1	0	2	0	2	7

== See also ==
- United States at the Paralympics
- United States at the 2022 Winter Olympics
