= Slovakia at the 2022 Winter Paralympics =

- Flag of Slovakia
- IPC code: SVK
- NPC: Slovak Paralympic Committee
- Website: www.spv.sk

in Beijing, China 4 March 2022 – 13 March 2022
- Competitors: 28 (22 men and 6 women) in 3 sports
- Flag bearers: Miroslav Haraus; Monika Kunkelová
- Medals Ranked 10th: Gold 3 Silver 0 Bronze 3 Total 6

Winter Paralympics appearances (overview)
- 1994; 1998; 2002; 2006; 2010; 2014; 2018; 2022; 2026

Other related appearances
- Czechoslovakia (1976–1992)

Slovakia competed at the 2022 Winter Paralympics in Beijing, China which took place between 4–13 March 2022.

== Medalists ==
The following Slovak competitors won medals at the games. In the discipline sections below, the medalists' names are bolded.

Medal	Name	Sport	Event	Date
Gold	Henrieta Farkašová; Guide: Michal Červeň	Alpine skiing	Women's combined	7 March
Gold	Alexandra Rexová; Guide: Eva Trajčíková	Alpine skiing	Women's super-G	6 March
Gold	Henrieta Farkašová; Guide: Martin Motyka	Alpine skiing	Women's downhill	5 March
Bronze	Miroslav Haraus; Guide: Maroš Hudík	Alpine skiing	Men's slalom, visually impaired	13 March
Bronze	Alexandra Rexová; Guide: Eva Trajčíková	Alpine skiing	Women's slalom	12 March
Bronze	Miroslav Haraus; Guide: Maroš Hudík	Alpine skiing	Men's giant slalom, visually impaired	10 March

**Medals by sport**
**Sport**	1st place, gold medalist(s)	2nd place, silver medalist(s)	3rd place, bronze medalist(s)	**Total**
Alpine skiing	3	0	3	**6**
**Total**	**3**	**0**	**3**	**6**

**Medals by gender**
**Gender**	1st place, gold medalist(s)	2nd place, silver medalist(s)	3rd place, bronze medalist(s)	**Total**
Male	0	0	2	**2**
Female	3	0	1	**4**
Mixed	0	0	0	**0**
**Total**	**3**	**0**	**3**	**6**

== Competitors ==
The following is the list of number of competitors in the Games.

Sport	Men	Women	Total
Alpine skiing	4	4	8
Para ice hockey	15	0	14
Wheelchair curling	3	2	5
Total	22	6	28

== Alpine skiing ==
Slovakia competed in alpine skiing.

Men

Athlete	Event	Run 1		Run 2		Final/Total		
Athlete	Event	Time	Rank	Time	Rank	Time	Diff	Rank
Miroslav Haraus; Guide: Maroš Hudík	Downhill, visually impaired	—N/a				1:16.01	+2.56	4
Miroslav Haraus; Guide: Maroš Hudík	Super-G, visually impaired	—N/a				1:10.29	+1.38	5
Miroslav Haraus; Guide: Maroš Hudík	Combined, visually impaired	1:11.02	6	DNF				
Miroslav Haraus; Guide: Maroš Hudík	Giant slalom, visually impaired	57.24	3	57.68	4	1:54.92	+5.58	3rd place, bronze medalist(s)
Miroslav Haraus; Guide: Maroš Hudík	Slalom, visually impaired	44.63	3	51.59	4	1:36.22	+9.40	3rd place, bronze medalist(s)
Jakub Krako; Guide: Branislav Brozman	Downhill, visually impaired	—N/a				1:16.09	+2.64	5
Jakub Krako; Guide: Branislav Brozman	Super-G, visually impaired	—N/a				DSQ		
Jakub Krako; Guide: Branislav Brozman	Combined, visually impaired	1:10.79	4	43.52	4	1:54.31	+4.51	4
Jakub Krako; Guide: Branislav Brozman	Giant slalom, visually impaired	DNF						
Jakub Krako; Guide: Branislav Brozman	Slalom, visually impaired	45.23	5	DNF				
Marek Kubačka; Guide: Mária Zaťovičová	Super-G, visually impaired	—N/a				DNF		
Marek Kubačka; Guide: Mária Zaťovičová	Combined, visually impaired	DNF						
Marek Kubačka; Guide: Mária Zaťovičová	Giant slalom, visually impaired	58.95	5	57.52	3	1:56.47	+7.13	4
Marek Kubačka; Guide: Mária Zaťovičová	Slalom, visually impaired	50.13	7	56.27	7	1:46.40	+19.58	6
Martin France
Martin France	Super-G, standing	—N/a				1:16.79	+7.68	25
Martin France	Combined, standing	1:16.46	19	46.44	18	2:02.90	+12.64	18
Martin France	Giant slalom, standing	1:03.72	17	1:02.14	18	2:05.86	+10.46	18
Martin France	Slalom, standing	48.73	19	56.05	13	1:44.78	+15.17	11

Women

Athlete	Event	Run 1		Run 2		Final/Total		
Athlete	Event	Time	Rank	Time	Rank	Time	Diff	Rank
Henrieta Farkašová; Guide: Martin Motyka	Downhill, visually impaired	—N/a				1:19.50	-	1st place, gold medalist(s)
Henrieta Farkašová; Guide: Martin Motyka	Slalom, visually impaired	46.70	4	50.30	6	1:37.00	+5.47	5
Henrieta Farkašová; Guide: Michal Červeň	Super-G, visually impaired	—N/a				DNF		
Henrieta Farkašová; Guide: Michal Červeň	Combined, visually impaired	1:18.57	2	44.82	2	2:03.39	-	1st place, gold medalist(s)
Henrieta Farkašová; Guide: Michal Červeň	Giant slalom, visually impaired	DNF						
Alexandra Rexová; Guide: Eva Trajčíková	Downhill, visually impaired	—N/a				1:25.13	+5.63	4
Alexandra Rexová; Guide: Eva Trajčíková	Super-G, visually impaired	—N/a				1:17.01	-	1st place, gold medalist(s)
Alexandra Rexová; Guide: Eva Trajčíková	Combined, visually impaired	1:20.01	3	DNF				
Alexandra Rexová; Guide: Eva Trajčíková	Giant slalom, visually impaired	59.76	5	1:02.26	4	2:02.02	+9.48	4
Alexandra Rexová; Guide: Eva Trajčíková	Slalom, visually impaired	46.38	3	49.93	5	1:36.31	+4.78	3rd place, bronze medalist(s)
Petra Smaržová	Super-G, standing	—N/a				1:29.42	+15.88	11
Petra Smaržová	Combined, standing	1:28.13	9	48.47	5	2:16.60	+20.09	7
Petra Smaržová	Giant slalom, standing	1:02.31	9	DNF				
Petra Smaržová	Slalom, standing	DNF						
Vanesa Gašková	Super-G, standing	—N/a				1:31.60	+18.06	13
Vanesa Gašková	Combined, standing	1:27.98	8	1:00.68	8	2:28.66	+32.15	8
Vanesa Gašková	Giant slalom, standing	1:10.24	14	1:13.30	11	2:23.54	+28.42	11
Vanesa Gašková	Slalom, standing	1:03.34	10	1:03.52	10	2:06.86	+35.10	9

== Para ice hockey ==
Slovakia competed in para ice hockey.

Summary

Team	Event	Preliminary round				Quarterfinal	Semifinal	Final / BM	
Team	Event	Opposition Result	Opposition Result	Opposition Result	Rank	Opposition Result	Opposition Result	Opposition Result	Rank
Slovakia	Mixed tournament	China; L 0–7	Italy; L 1–2 GWS	Czech Republic; L 0–3	4	did not advance			7

Preliminary round

Pos	Team	Pld	W	OTW	OTL	L	GF	GA	GD	Pts	Qualification
1	China (H)	3	3	0	0	0	18	2	+16	9	Quarterfinals
2	Czech Republic	3	2	0	0	1	10	5	+5	6	Quarterfinals
3	Italy	3	0	1	0	2	2	12	−10	2	Quarterfinals
4	Slovakia	3	0	0	1	2	1	12	−11	1	Eliminated

Source: Beijing 2022
(H) Host

5 March 2022; 20:05	Slovakia	0–7 (0–2, 0–1, 0–4)	China	Beijing National Indoor Stadium, Beijing; Attendance: 1,230

Game reference

Eduard Lepáček
Goalies
Ji Yanzhao
Referee:
(Canada) Kevin Webinger
Linesmen:
(Netherlands) Louis Beelen
(Czech Republic) Jan Vaněk

0–1	08:39 – Shen (SH)
0–2	13:01 – Shen (Wang Z.)
0–3	19:43 – Cui (Wang Z., Shen)
0–4	32:51 – Shen (Wang Z.) (SH)
0–5	38:00 – Li (Lyu)
0–6	41:21 – Shen (Cui)
0–7	43:58 – Tian (Zhu, Ji) (PP)

8 min
Penalties
10 min
8
Shots
28

6 March 2022; 16:35	Italy	2–1 GWS (0–0, 0–1, 1–0) (OT: 0–0) (SO: 1–0)	Slovakia	Beijing National Indoor Stadium, Beijing

Game reference
Gabriele Araudo; Julian Kasslatter	Goalies	Eduard Lepáček	Referee: (Norway) Owe Lüthcke; Linesmen: (Sweden) Tony Rundström (Czech Republic) Jan Vaněk
/ 0–1 / 29:50 – Korman (Stašák); Rosa (Larch) – 39:03 / 1–1			Referee: (Norway) Owe Lüthcke; Linesmen: (Sweden) Tony Rundström (Czech Republic) Jan Vaněk
Larch; Depaoli (miss); Rosa; Larch	Shootout	(miss) Stašák; Joppa; Ligda; (miss) Joppa	Referee: (Norway) Owe Lüthcke; Linesmen: (Sweden) Tony Rundström (Czech Republic) Jan Vaněk
2 min	Penalties	4 min	Referee: (Norway) Owe Lüthcke; Linesmen: (Sweden) Tony Rundström (Czech Republic) Jan Vaněk
24	Shots	12	Referee: (Norway) Owe Lüthcke; Linesmen: (Sweden) Tony Rundström (Czech Republic) Jan Vaněk

8 March 2022; 20:05	Czech Republic	3–0 (1–0, 1–0, 1–0)	Slovakia	Beijing National Indoor Stadium, Beijing

Game reference

Michal Vápenka
Goalies
Eduard Lepáček
Referee:
(Canada) Kevin Webinger
Linesmen:
(Netherlands) Louis Beelen
(Canada) Matt Fergenbaum

Krupička (Sedláček, Geier) – 01:23	1–0
Kubeš (Palát, Ohar) – 25:00	2–0
Geier (Doležal, Sedláček) – 39:19	3–0

4 min
Penalties
8 min
19
Shots
7

== Wheelchair curling ==
Slovakia competed in wheelchair curling.

Summary

Team	Event	Group stage											Semifinal	BM	
Team	Event	Opposition Score	Opposition Score	Opposition Score	Opposition Score	Opposition Score	Opposition Score	Opposition Score	Opposition Score	Opposition Score	Opposition Score	Rank	Opposition Score	Opposition Score	Rank
Radoslav Ďuriš; Peter Zaťko; Dušan Pitoňák; Monika Kunkelová; Alena Kánová	Mixed	USA; W 9–3	NOR; L 3–9	LAT; L 4–8	GBR; W 7–3	KOR; W 7–2	CAN; W 9–8	CHN; L 7–5	SWE; W 6–5	SUI; W 8–6	EST; W 7–6	2 Q	SWE; L 4–6	CAN; L 3–8	4

Round robin Final round-robin standings

Key
Teams to Playoffs

Country	Skip	W	L	W–L	PF	PA	EW	EL	BE	SE	S%	DSC
China	Wang Haitao	8	2	–	68	39	36	28	2	13	71%	122.32
Slovakia	Radoslav Ďuriš	7	3	2–0	65	57	40	33	1	16	65%	95.19
Sweden	Viljo Petersson-Dahl	7	3	1–1	66	52	37	35	3	18	68%	91.08
Canada	Mark Ideson	7	3	0–2	69	50	36	33	2	11	71%	95.29
United States	Matthew Thums	5	5	1–0	60	75	32	39	2	6	60%	70.98
South Korea	Go Seung-nam	5	5	0–1	64	59	35	37	0	11	64%	103.20
Norway	Jostein Stordahl	4	6	2–0	60	64	37	38	2	13	64%	107.82
Great Britain	Hugh Nibloe	4	6	1–1	67	56	37	36	0	16	62%	134.75
Latvia	Poļina Rožkova	4	6	0–2	61	71	40	32	0	18	63%	100.43
Estonia	Andrei Koitmäe	3	7	–	51	69	32	41	2	13	61%	106.21
Switzerland	Laurent Kneubühl	1	9	–	48	87	32	42	0	8	56%	109.27

Wheelchair curling round robin summary table
Pos.	Country	Canada	China	Estonia	Great Britain	Japan	Norway	Slovakia	South Korea	Sweden	Switzerland	United States	Record
4	Canada	—N/a	7–3	9–3	6–3	10–3	7–6	8–9	4–9	3–6	8–4	7–4	7–3
1	China	3–7	—	9–3	6–3	9–2	7–4	7–5	9–4	1–5	7–4	10–2	8–2
10	Estonia	3–9	3–9	—	5–10	6–5	8–3	6–7	2–5	4–6	8–6	6–9	3–7
8	Great Britain	3–6	3–6	10–5	—	8–4	5–7	3–7	6–8	4–6	15–1	10–6	4–6
9	Latvia	3–10	2–9	5–6	4–8	—	6–8	8–4	8–4	9–7	9–7	7–8	4–6
7	Norway	6–7	4–7	3–8	7–5	8–6	—	9–3	4–9	6–8	8–5	5–6	4–6
2	Slovakia	9–8	5–7	7–6	7–3	4–8	3–9	—	7–2	6–5	8–6	9–3	7–3
6	South Korea	9–4	4–9	5–2	8–6	4–8	9–4	2–7	—	10–4	7–8	6–7	5–5
3	Sweden	6–3	5–1	6–4	6–4	7–9	8–6	5–6	4–10	—	9–2	10–7	7–3
11	Switzerland	4–8	4–7	6–8	1–15	7–9	5–8	6–8	8–7	2–9	—	5–8	1–9
5	United States	4–7	2–10	9–6	6–10	8–7	6–5	3–9	7–6	7–10	8–5	—	5–5

Draw 1
Saturday, March 5, 14:35

Sheet C	1	2	3	4	5	6	7	8	Final
Slovakia (Ďuriš) 🔨	2	4	0	1	0	1	1	X	9
United States (Thums)	0	0	1	0	2	0	0	X	3

Draw 3
Sunday, March 6, 9:35

Sheet B	1	2	3	4	5	6	7	8	Final
Slovakia (Ďuriš)	0	0	0	0	3	0	0	X	3
Norway (Stordahl) 🔨	1	0	2	1	0	3	2	X	9

Draw 5
Sunday, March 6, 19:35

Sheet D	1	2	3	4	5	6	7	8	Final
Slovakia (Ďuriš)	1	0	1	2	0	0	0	X	4
Latvia (Rožkova) 🔨	0	2	0	0	1	2	3	X	8

Draw 8
Monday, March 7, 19:35

Sheet B	1	2	3	4	5	6	7	8	Final
Great Britain (Nibloe)	0	1	0	0	1	0	1	0	3
Slovakia (Ďuriš) 🔨	1	0	2	2	0	1	0	1	7

Draw 10
Tuesday, March 8, 14:35

Sheet A	1	2	3	4	5	6	7	8	Final
Slovakia (Ďuriš)	1	1	1	1	1	0	2	X	7
South Korea (Go) 🔨	0	0	0	0	0	2	0	X	2

Draw 11
Tuesday, March 8, 19:35

Sheet B	1	2	3	4	5	6	7	8	Final
Canada (Ideson)	1	1	0	1	0	4	0	1	8
Slovakia (Ďuriš) 🔨	0	0	2	0	4	0	3	0	9

Draw 12
Wednesday, March 9, 9:35

Sheet D	1	2	3	4	5	6	7	8	Final
China (Wang) 🔨	0	2	0	0	3	2	0	X	7
Slovakia (Ďuriš)	1	0	1	1	0	0	2	X	5

Draw 13
Wednesday, March 9, 14:35

Sheet A	1	2	3	4	5	6	7	8	Final
Sweden (Petersson-Dahl) 🔨	3	0	0	1	0	0	1	0	5
Slovakia (Ďuriš)	0	1	2	0	1	1	0	1	6

Draw 15
Thursday, March 10, 9:35

Sheet C	1	2	3	4	5	6	7	8	Final
Slovakia (Ďuriš)	0	1	0	0	2	0	5	X	8
Switzerland (Kneubühl) 🔨	2	0	1	1	0	2	0	X	6

Draw 17
Thursday, March 10, 19:35

Sheet D	1	2	3	4	5	6	7	8	Final
Slovakia (Ďuriš) 🔨	1	0	0	1	0	2	1	2	7
Estonia (Koitmäe)	0	1	3	0	2	0	0	0	6

Semifinal

Friday, March 11, 14:35

Sheet A	1	2	3	4	5	6	7	8	Final
Slovakia (Ďuriš) 🔨	0	0	0	3	1	0	0	0	4
Sweden (Petersson-Dahl)	1	1	1	0	0	1	1	1	6

Bronze match
Friday, March 11, 19:35

Sheet B	1	2	3	4	5	6	7	8	Final
Canada (Ideson)	1	1	0	0	1	1	0	4	8
Slovakia (Ďuriš) 🔨	0	0	0	2	0	0	1	0	3

== See also ==
- Slovakia at the Paralympics
- Slovakia at the 2022 Winter Olympics
