= Ice hockey at the 2022 Winter Paralympics =

2022 Winter Paralympics

Tournament details
- Host country: China
- Venue: Beijing National Indoor Stadium
- Dates: 5–13 March 2022
- Teams: 7

Final positions
- Champions: United States (5th title)
- Runners-up: Canada
- Third place: China
- Fourth place: South Korea

Tournament statistics
- Games played: 16
- Goals scored: 101 (6.31 per game)
- Scoring leader: (United States) Declan Farmer (18 points)

Awards
- MVP: (United States) Declan Farmer

The Para ice hockey competition of the 2022 Winter Paralympics was held at the Beijing National Indoor Stadium, China, from 5 to 13 March 2022. A total of seven teams competed in the mixed team tournament.

Yu Jing from China has become the third female Para ice hockey player at the Paralympic Games, preceded by Britt Mjaasund Øyen and Lena Schrøder from Norway who previously competed in para ice hockey at the Winter Paralympics.

== Medalists ==
Event	Gold	Silver	Bronze
Mixed Tournament	United States; Ralph DeQuebec; Travis Dodson; David Eustace; Declan Farmer; Noah Grove; Malik Jones; Griffin LaMarre; Jen Lee; Kevin McKee; Josh Misiewicz; Evan Nichols; Josh Pauls; Rico Roman; Brody Roybal; Jack Wallace; Joseph Woodke; Kyle Zych	Canada; Rob Armstrong; Billy Bridges; Rod Crane; Ben Delaney; Adam Dixon; James Dunn; Tyrone Henry; Liam Hickey; Anton Jacobs-Webb; Adam Kingsmill; Dominic Larocque; Zach Lavin; Antoine Lehoux; Tyler McGregor; Garrett Riley; Branden Sison; Greg Westlake	China; Bai Xuesong; Che Hang; Cui Yutao; Hu Guangjian; Ji Yanzhao; Li Hongguan; Lyu Zhi; Qiu Dianpeng; Shen Yifeng; Song Xiaodong; Tian Jintao; Wang Jujiang; Wang Wei; Wang Zhidong; Xu Jinqiang; Yu Jing; Zhang Zheng; Zhu Zhanfu

== Qualification ==
Qualifying event	Date	Venue	Vacancies	Qualified
Host nation	31 July 2015	(Malaysia) Kuala Lumpur	1	China
2021 World Championships	19–26 June 2021	(Czech Republic) Ostrava	5	Canada; United States; ~~RPC~~ (Note: Russia and Belarus were banned from competing in the Paralympics after the countries' invasion of Ukraine.); South Korea; Czech Republic
Paralympic Qualification Tournament	26 November – 1 December 2021	(Germany) Berlin	2	Italy; Slovakia

== Match officials ==
5 referees and 7 linesmen were selected for the tournament.

Referees

- (Canada) Kevin Webinger
- (Denmark) Jacob Grumsen
- (Norway) Kenneth Danielsen
- (Norway) Owe Lüthcke
- (United States) Bobby Esposito

Linesmen

- (Austria) David Nothegger
- (Canada) Matt Fergenbaum
- (Czech Republic) Jan Vaněk
- (Netherlands) Louis Beelen
- (Serbia) Tibor Fazekaš
- (Sweden) Andreas Lundén
- (Sweden) Tony Rundström

== Preliminary round ==
All times are local (UTC+8).

=== Group A ===
Pos	Team	Pld	W	OTW	OTL	L	GF	GA	GD	Pts	Qualification
1	United States	2	2	0	0	0	14	1	+13	6	Semifinals
2	Canada	2	1	0	0	1	6	5	+1	3	Semifinals
3	South Korea	2	0	0	0	2	1	15	−14	0	Quarterfinals
−	~~RPC~~	0	0	0	0	0	0	0	0	0	Disqualified

Source: Beijing 2022

5 March 2022; 09:35	~~RPC~~	Cancelled	South Korea	Beijing National Indoor Stadium, Beijing

5 March 2022; 13:05	United States	5–0 (2–0, 2–0, 1–0)	Canada	Beijing National Indoor Stadium, Beijing

Game reference

Jen Lee
Goalies
Dominic Larocque
Adam Kingsmill
Referee:
(Norway) Owe Lüthcke
Linesmen:
(Sweden) Andreas Lundén
(Sweden) Tony Rundström

Pauls (Farmer, Wallace) (PP) – 05:44	1–0
Roybal (Farmer) – 14:48	2–0
Jones (Wallace, Grove) – 25:27	3–0
Misiewicz (Farmer, Pauls) – 28:57	4–0
Farmer (McKee, Misiewicz) – 41:26	5–0

2 min
Penalties
4 min
26
Shots
9

6 March 2022; 09:35	Canada	Cancelled	~~RPC~~	Beijing National Indoor Stadium, Beijing

6 March 2022; 13:05	South Korea	1–9 (0–5, 0–4, 1–0)	United States	Beijing National Indoor Stadium, Beijing

Game reference

Lee Jae-woong
Choi Hyuk-jun
Goalies
Jen Lee
Griffin LaMarre
Referee:
(Denmark) Jacob Grumsen
Linesmen:
(Netherlands) Louis Beelen
(Canada) Matt Fergenbaum

	0–1	04:25 – Wallace (Misiewicz, Nichols)
	0–2	08:58 – Wallace (Dodson)
	0–3	09:43 – Misiewicz (Farmer, Nichols)
	0–4	11:03 – Roybal (Farmer, Wallace)
	0–5	13:53 – Wallace (Misiewicz, Pauls)
	0–6	24:56 – Jones (Zych, DeQuebec)
	0–7	26:51 – Farmer (Misiewicz, Pauls) (PP)
	0–8	28:27 – Farmer (Roybal, Pauls) (PP)
	0–9	29:47 – Jones (Nichols, Farmer) (PP)
Jung – 33:21	1–9

10 min
Penalties
2 min
3
Shots
39

8 March 2022; 09:35	United States	Cancelled	~~RPC~~	Beijing National Indoor Stadium, Beijing

8 March 2022; 13:05	Canada	6–0 (2–0, 1–0, 3–0)	South Korea	Beijing National Indoor Stadium, Beijing

Game reference

Dominic Larocque
Goalies
Lee Jae-woong
Choi Hyuk-jun
Referee:
(Norway) Kenneth Danielsen
Linesmen:
(Serbia) Tibor Fazekaš
(Austria) David Nothegger

Hickey (Dunn, Bridges) – 07:14	1–0
Dunn (Armstrong) – 07:35	2–0
Dunn (Jacobs-Webb, Riley) – 21:08	3–0
Bridges (Dixon, McGregor) – 34:20	4–0
McGregor – 35:39	5–0
Dunn (Dixon, Bridges) (PP) – 42:50	6–0

29 min
Penalties
10 min
42
Shots
4

=== Group B ===
Pos	Team	Pld	W	OTW	OTL	L	GF	GA	GD	Pts	Qualification
1	China (H)	3	3	0	0	0	18	2	+16	9	Quarterfinals
2	Czech Republic	3	2	0	0	1	10	5	+5	6	Quarterfinals
3	Italy	3	0	1	0	2	2	12	−10	2	Quarterfinals
4	Slovakia	3	0	0	1	2	1	12	−11	1	Eliminated

Source: Beijing 2022
(H) Host

5 March 2022; 16:35	Czech Republic	5–0 (2–0, 2–0, 1–0)	Italy	Beijing National Indoor Stadium, Beijing

Game reference

Martin Kudela
Goalies
Gabriele Araudo
Julian Kasslatter
Referee:
(Norway) Kenneth Danielsen
Linesmen:
(Serbia) Tibor Fazekaš
(Austria) David Nothegger

Kubeš (Wagner, Raul) (EA) – 10:49	1–0
Zelinka (Doležal, Raul) – 12:36	2–0
Palát (Krupička, Hábl) – 15:54	3–0
Hečko (Wagner) – 17:31	4–0
Geier (Wagner, Kubeš) (PP) – 36:35	5–0

6 min
Penalties
2 min
14
Shots
11

5 March 2022; 20:05	Slovakia	0–7 (0–2, 0–1, 0–4)	China	Beijing National Indoor Stadium, Beijing; Attendance: 1,230

Game reference

Eduard Lepáček
Goalies
Ji Yanzhao
Referee:
(Canada) Kevin Webinger
Linesmen:
(Netherlands) Louis Beelen
(Czech Republic) Jan Vaněk

0–1	08:39 – Shen (SH)
0–2	13:01 – Shen (Wang Z.)
0–3	19:43 – Cui (Wang Z., Shen)
0–4	32:51 – Shen (Wang Z.) (SH)
0–5	38:00 – Li (Lyu)
0–6	41:21 – Shen (Cui)
0–7	43:58 – Tian (Zhu, Ji) (PP)

8 min
Penalties
10 min
8
Shots
28

6 March 2022; 16:35	Italy	2–1 GWS (0–0, 0–1, 1–0) (OT: 0–0) (SO: 1–0)	Slovakia	Beijing National Indoor Stadium, Beijing

Game reference
Gabriele Araudo; Julian Kasslatter	Goalies	Eduard Lepáček	Referee: (Norway) Owe Lüthcke; Linesmen: (Sweden) Tony Rundström (Czech Republic) Jan Vaněk
/ 0–1 / 29:50 – Korman (Stašák); Rosa (Larch) – 39:03 / 1–1			Referee: (Norway) Owe Lüthcke; Linesmen: (Sweden) Tony Rundström (Czech Republic) Jan Vaněk
Larch; Depaoli (miss); Rosa; Larch	Shootout	(miss) Stašák; Joppa; Ligda; (miss) Joppa	Referee: (Norway) Owe Lüthcke; Linesmen: (Sweden) Tony Rundström (Czech Republic) Jan Vaněk
2 min	Penalties	4 min	Referee: (Norway) Owe Lüthcke; Linesmen: (Sweden) Tony Rundström (Czech Republic) Jan Vaněk
24	Shots	12	Referee: (Norway) Owe Lüthcke; Linesmen: (Sweden) Tony Rundström (Czech Republic) Jan Vaněk

6 March 2022; 20:05	China	5–2 (0–0, 5–1, 0–1)	Czech Republic	Beijing National Indoor Stadium, Beijing; Attendance: 1,207

Game reference

Ji Yanzhao
Goalies
Martin Kudela
Michal Vápenka
Referee:
(United States) Bobby Esposito
Linesmen:
(Serbia) Tibor Fazekaš
(Sweden) Andreas Lundén

Shen (Wang Z.) – 15:11	1–0
Zhu (Xu, Shen) (PP) – 17:38	2–0
Wang J. – 17:53	3–0
Tian (Li) (SH) – 21:06	4–0
	4–1	21:53 – Ohar (Doležal, Veselý)
Li (Lyu) (SH) – 29:52	5–1
	5–2	43:04 – Krupička (Hečko, Sedláček)

14 min
Penalties
16 min
21
Shots
8

8 March 2022; 16:35	Italy	0–6 (0–4, 0–2, 0–0)	China	Beijing National Indoor Stadium, Beijing; Attendance: 1,224

Game reference

Julian Kasslatter
Gabriele Araudo
Goalies
Wang Wei
Referee:
(Denmark) Jacob Grumsen
Linesmen:
(Sweden) Tony Rundström
(Czech Republic) Jan Vaněk

0–1	00:16 – Wang Z. (Shen)
0–2	02:41 – Bai (Wang Z.)
0–3	03:52 – Qiu (Li, Tian)
0–4	12:08 – Hu (Tian) (PP2)
0–5	17:42 – Wang Z. (Tian, Li)
0–6	25:23 – Qiu (Lyu)

22 min
Penalties
10 min
1
Shots
25

8 March 2022; 20:05	Czech Republic	3–0 (1–0, 1–0, 1–0)	Slovakia	Beijing National Indoor Stadium, Beijing

Game reference

Michal Vápenka
Goalies
Eduard Lepáček
Referee:
(Canada) Kevin Webinger
Linesmen:
(Netherlands) Louis Beelen
(Canada) Matt Fergenbaum

Krupička (Sedláček, Geier) – 01:23	1–0
Kubeš (Palát, Ohar) – 25:00	2–0
Geier (Doležal, Sedláček) – 39:19	3–0

4 min
Penalties
8 min
19
Shots
7

== Playoff round ==
=== Bracket ===
Quarterfinals
9 March
China	4
Czech Republic	3
9 March
South Korea	4
Italy	0

Semifinals
11 March
United States	11
China	0
11 March
Canada	11
South Korea	0

Gold medal game
13 March
United States	5
Canada	0
Bronze medal game
12 March
China	4
South Korea	0

=== Quarterfinals ===
9 March 2022; 16:35	South Korea	4–0 (1–0, 1–0, 2–0)	Italy	Beijing National Indoor Stadium, Beijing; Attendance: 1,206

Game reference

Choi Hyuk-jun
Goalies
Gabriele Araudo
Referee:
(United States) Bobby Esposito
Linesmen:
(Canada) Matt Fergenbaum
(Sweden) Andreas Lundén

Jang D. – 03:30	1–0
Jung (Jang D., Lee Jo.) – 25:53	2–0
Lee Jo. (Jung) – 30:25	3–0
Jang D. (Jang J.) (ENG) – 42:38	4–0

10 min
Penalties
12 min
17
Shots
15

9 March 2022; 20:05	China	4–3 (1–1, 1–0, 2–2)	Czech Republic	Beijing National Indoor Stadium, Beijing

Game reference

Ji Yanzhao
Goalies
Martin Kudela
Referee:
(Norway) Owe Lüthcke
Linesmen:
(Austria) David Nothegger
(Sweden) Tony Rundström

Wang Z. (Cui, Zhu) – 06:48	1–0
	1–1	08:06 – Geier (Hábl, Wagner)
Tian (Cui) – 20:29	2–1
Shen (Cui, Wang Z.) (PP) – 30:29	3–1
	3–2	32:41 – Hečko (Ohar)
	3–3	39:01 – Novotný (Geier, Hábl) (PP)
Wang Z. (Shen) – 43:09	4–3

10 min
Penalties
4 min
16
Shots
12

=== Semifinals ===
11 March 2022; 12:05	Canada	11–0 (3–0, 4–0, 4–0)	South Korea	Beijing National Indoor Stadium, Beijing; Attendance: 943

Game reference

Dominic Larocque
Adam Kingsmill
Goalies
Choi Hyuk-jun
Lee Jae-woong
Referee:
(Denmark) Jacob Grumsen
Linesmen:
(Austria) David Nothegger
(Czech Republic) Jan Vaněk

Hickey (Dixon, McGregor) – 09:48	1–0
Bridges (Delaney) (PP) – 13:37	2–0
McGregor (Hickey, Westlake) – 14:41	3–0
Bridges (Dunn, Dixon) – 15:45	4–0
Bridges (Dunn, Hickey) – 18:11	5–0
McGregor (Hickey) – 19:26	6–0
Westlake (McGregor, Hickey) – 19:57	7–0
McGregor (Westlake, Henry) – 32:15	8–0
Riley – 34:37	9–0
Jacobs-Webb (Dixon, Lehoux) – 37:37	10–0
McGregor (Henry, Lavin) – 44:18	11–0

8 min
Penalties
4 min
43
Shots
3

11 March 2022; 20:05	United States	11–0 (4–0, 5–0, 2–0)	China	Beijing National Indoor Stadium, Beijing; Attendance: 987

Game reference

Jen Lee
Goalies
Ji Yanzhao
Wang Wei
Referee:
(Canada) Kevin Webinger
Linesmen:
(Canada) Matt Fergenbaum
(Sweden) Andreas Lundén

Roybal (Farmer) – 05:23	1–0
Roybal (Farmer) – 05:55	2–0
Misiewicz (Farmer, Zych) – 08:45	3–0
Roybal (Farmer, Misiewicz) (PP) – 14:05	4–0
Misiewicz (Pauls) – 17:59	5–0
Farmer (Misiewicz, Roybal) (PP) – 19:47	6–0
Jones (Wallace, Roybal) (PP) – 22:31	7–0
Farmer (Zych) – 23:13	8–0
Woodke (Zych, Wallace) (PP) – 27:40	9–0
Roybal (Wallace, Jones) – 31:57	10–0
Pauls – 33:02	11–0

6 min
Penalties
12 min
37
Shots
6

=== Seventh place game ===
10 March 2022; 18:05	Cancelled	Beijing National Indoor Stadium, Beijing

=== Fifth place game ===
11 March 2022; 16:05	Czech Republic	3–4 OT (0–0, 1–1, 2–2) (OT: 0–1)	Italy	Beijing National Indoor Stadium, Beijing

Game reference

Michal Vápenka
Goalies
Julian Kasslatter
Referee:
(United States) Bobby Esposito
Linesmen:
(Netherlands) Louis Beelen
(Serbia) Tibor Fazekaš

	0–1	24:11 – Rosa (Macrì) (PP)
Ohar (Veselý, Palát) (PP) – 27:24	1–1
Novotný (PS) – 37:05	2–1
	2–2	40:48 – Rosa (Larch, Depaoli)
Geier (Novotný, Raul) – 44:15	3–2
	3–3	44:48 – Macrì (Rosa) (EA)
	3–4	51:47 – Depaoli (Macrì)

8 min
Penalties
8 min
19
Shots
18

=== Bronze medal game ===
12 March 2022; 20:05	China	4–0 (1–0, 1–0, 2–0)	South Korea	Beijing National Indoor Stadium, Beijing; Attendance: 492

Game reference

Ji Yanzhao
Goalies
Lee Jae-woong
Referee:
(Canada) Kevin Webinger
Linesmen:
(Canada) Matt Fergenbaum
(Sweden) Tony Rundström

Wang Z. (Shen, Zhu) – 04:06	1–0
Shen – 16:00	2–0
Li (Shen, Zhu) – 43:15	3–0
Shen (Wang Z.) (ENG) – 44:48	4–0

22 min
Penalties
16 min
23
Shots
11

=== Gold medal game ===
13 March 2022; 12:05	United States	5–0 (2–0, 2–0, 1–0)	Canada	Beijing National Indoor Stadium, Beijing; Attendance: 1,012

Game reference

Jen Lee
Goalies
Dominic Larocque
Referee:
(Denmark) Jacob Grumsen
Linesmen:
(Sweden) Andreas Lundén
(Czech Republic) Jan Vaněk

Farmer (SH) – 09:08	1–0
Roybal (SH) – 09:33	2–0
Roybal (Woodke) – 17:39	3–0
Pauls (Farmer) – 22:51	4–0
Farmer (Pauls, Roybal) – 35:57	5–0

10 min
Penalties
2 min
20
Shots
16

== Final ranking ==
Pos	Grp	Team	Pld	W	OTW	OTL	L	GF	GA	GD	Pts
1st place, gold medalist(s)	A	United States	4	4	0	0	0	30	1	+29	12
2nd place, silver medalist(s)	A	Canada	4	2	0	0	2	17	10	+7	6
3rd place, bronze medalist(s)	B	China (H)	6	5	0	0	1	26	16	+10	15
4	A	South Korea	5	1	0	0	4	5	30	−25	3
5	B	Italy	5	0	2	0	3	6	19	−13	4
6	B	Czech Republic	5	2	0	1	2	16	13	+3	7
7	B	Slovakia	3	0	0	1	2	1	12	−11	1
−	A	~~RPC~~	0	0	0	0	0	0	0	0	0

Source: Beijing 2022
(H) Host

== Statistics ==
=== Scoring leaders ===
List shows the top ten skaters sorted by points, then goals.

Player	GP	G	A	Pts	+/−	PIM	POS
(United States) Declan Farmer	4	7	11	18	+16	0	F
(China) Shen Yifeng	6	8	6	14	+10	20	F
(United States) Brody Roybal	4	8	4	12	+12	2	F
(China) Wang Zhidong	6	5	7	12	+11	8	F
(United States) Josh Misiewicz	4	4	6	10	+10	4	F
(United States) Josh Pauls	4	3	6	9	+10	0	D
(United States) Jack Wallace	4	3	6	9	+16	4	D
(Canada) Tyler McGregor	4	5	3	8	+5	2	F
(Canada) Billy Bridges	4	4	2	6	+2	0	F
(Czech Republic) Michal Geier	5	4	2	6	+1	2	F

GP = Games played; G = Goals; A = Assists; Pts = Points; +/− = Plus/minus; PIM = Penalties in minutes; POS = Position
Source: Beijing 2022

=== Leading goaltenders ===
Only the top five goaltenders, based on save percentage, who have played at least 40% of their team's minutes, are included in this list.

Player	TOI	GA	GAA	SA	Sv%	SO
(United States) Jen Lee	165:00	0	0.00	33	100.00	3
(Czech Republic) Michal Vápenka	119:25	5	1.88	34	85.29	1
(Slovakia) Eduard Lepáček	140:00	11	3.54	70	84.29	0
(China) Ji Yanzhao	195:00	9	2.08	53	83.02	2
(South Korea) Lee Jae-woong	151:13	21	6.25	115	81.74	0

TOI = Time on ice (minutes:seconds); GA = Goals against; GAA = Goals against average; SA = Shots against; Sv% = Save percentage; SO = Shutouts
Source: Beijing 2022

== Awards ==
Best players selected by the Directorate

Position	Player
Goaltender	(South Korea) Lee Jae-woong
Defenceman	(United States) Jack Wallace
Forward	(China) Shen Yifeng

All-Star team

Position	Player
Goaltender	(United States) Jen Lee
Defenceman	(Canada) Tyler McGregor
Defenceman	(United States) Josh Pauls
Forward	(United States) Declan Farmer
Forward	(Canada) Billy Bridges
Forward	(China) Shen Yifeng
MVP	(United States) Declan Farmer
