= Tyler Carter (alpine skier) =

American para-alpine skier (born 1994)

Personal information
- Born: January 16, 1994 (age 32) Reading, Pennsylvania, U.S.
- Height: 5 ft 10 in (178 cm)
- Website: TC Ski - the official site of Paralympian Tyler Carter

Skiing career
- Sport: Alpine skiing
- Disciplines: Giant slalom Standing; Slalom Standing

Tyler Carter (born January 16, 1994) is an American Paralympic alpine skier.

== Early life ==
Carter was born in Reading, Pennsylvania, United States of America.

== Career ==
He participated in the Paralympics three times: Sochi 2014, Pyeongchang 2018, Beijing 2022. In the Paralympics to date, he has participated in various alpine skiing disciplines such as Giant slalom, slalom and Downhill. It is also a manifestation of his motto as a disabled athlete, "Never ever give up, because you accomplish amazing things if you try".

He also served as the flag bearer of the USA at the Beijing Paralympics.

Carter participated in the 2015 World Champion.
