= Yu Jing (sledge hockey) =

Chinese ice sledge hockey player (born 1983)

- Born: 22 September 1983 (age 43)
- Position: Forward
Medal record
Para ice hockey
Representing China
Paralympic Games
Bronze medal – third place	2022 Beijing	Team
World Championship
Gold medal – first place	2021 Czech Republic (Pool B)	Team

Yu Jing (born 22 September 1983) is a Chinese ice sledge hockey player. She is a gold medalist at Pool B of the World Para Ice Hockey Championships and a bronze medalist at the Winter Paralympics.

== Career ==
Yu competed for the China national team at Pool B of the 2021 World Para Ice Hockey Championships, where her team won the gold medal.

At the 2022 Winter Paralympics, Yu became the third female para ice hockey player at the Winter Paralympic Games after Norwegians Britt Mjaasund Øyen and Lena Schrøder and the first Chinese woman to do so. She was also a member of China's bronze medal-winning team in para ice hockey at the 2022 Winter Paralympics, thus becoming the second woman to win a Paralympic medal in this sport.
