= Tyrone Henry =

Canadian ice sledge hockey player

Personal information
- Born: October 21, 1993 (age 32) Winnipeg, Manitoba, Canada
Medal record
Para ice hockey
Representing Canada
Paralympic Games
Silver medal – second place	2018 Pyeongchang	Team competition
Silver medal – second place	2022 Beijing	Team competition
Silver medal – second place	2026 Milano Cortina	Team competition
World Championships
Gold medal – first place	2017 Gangneung	Team competition
Gold medal – first place	2024 Calgary	Team competition
Silver medal – second place	2019 Ostrava	Team competition
Silver medal – second place	2021 Ostrava	Team competition
Silver medal – second place	2023 Moose Jaw	Team competition
Silver medal – second place	2025 Buffalo	Team competition

Tyrone Henry (born October 21, 1993) is a Canadian ice sledge hockey player.

== Career ==
Henry was a member of the silver medal-winning Canadian para ice hockey teams at the 2018 and 2022 Winter Paralympics. Henry had an interest in sledge hockey that predated the accident that disabled him. He competed at the 2026 Winter Paralympics and won a silver medal, Canada's third consecutive silver medal in Para ice hockey at the Winter Paralympics.
