= Zach Lavin =

Canadian ice sledge hockey player (born 1997)

Personal information
- Full name: Zachary Lavin
- Born: January 31, 1997 (age 29) Essex, Ontario, Canada
- Years active: 2019–present
- Height: 6 ft 1 in (185 cm)
- Weight: 210 lb (95 kg; 15 st)

Sport
- Country: Canada
- Sport: Ice sled hockey
- Position: Defense
Medal record
Para ice hockey
Representing Canada
Paralympic Games
Silver medal – second place	2022 Beijing	Team competition
Silver medal – second place	2026 Milano Cortina	Team competition
World Championships
Gold medal – first place	2024 Calgary	Team competition
Silver medal – second place	2019 Ostrava	Team competition
Silver medal – second place	2021 Ostrava	Team competition
Silver medal – second place	2023 Moose Jaw	Team competition
Silver medal – second place	2025 Buffalo	Team competition

Zachary Lavin (born January 31, 1997) is a Canadian ice sled hockey player who was a member of the Canada national para ice hockey team that won silver at the 2022 and 2026 Winter Paralympics.

== Career ==
Lavin made his international debut for Canada at the 2019 World Para Ice Hockey Championships, where he ranked tenth in tournament scoring with three goals and five assists, and won a silver medal. He again represented Canada at the 2021 World Para Ice Hockey Championships and won a silver medal. He again represented Canada at the 2024 World Para Ice Hockey Championships and won a gold medal.

Lavin represented Canada at the 2022 Winter Paralympics and won a silver medal.

On January 20, 2026, he was again selected to represent Canada at the 2026 Winter Paralympics. He won a silver medal, Canada's third consecutive silver medal in Para ice hockey at the Winter Paralympics.

== Personal life ==
In February 2015, Lavin got lost on a hiking trip in the Rocky Mountains for three days, as a result he suffered severe frostbite to his hands and feet. He overcame frostbite to his hands, but could not overcome the frostbite to his feet, which led to both his legs being amputated below the knee. He spent more than a week in the hospital being treated for frostbite and nearly four months in the hospital recovering from the surgery. He was introduced to the sport of ice sled hockey by former Canadian national team member Chris Cederstrand, and began playing para ice hockey with the Calgary Scorpions in 2016.
