= Rod Crane =

Canadian ice sledge hockey player

Personal information
- Born: September 6, 1991 (age 34)

Sport
- Country: Canada
- Sport: Ice sledge hockey
Medal record
Para ice hockey
Representing Canada
Paralympic Games
| Silver medal – second place | 2022 Beijing | Team competition |
World Championships
| Silver medal – second place | 2019 Ostrava | Team competition |
| Silver medal – second place | 2021 Ostrava | Team competition |
| Silver medal – second place | 2023 Moose Jaw | Team competition |

Rod Crane (born September 5, 1991) is a Canadian ice sledge hockey player and alpine skier.

== Career ==
Crane represented Canada at the 2022 Winter Paralympics in Para ice hockey, winning a silver medal. He completed at the 2019, 2021 World Para Ice Hockey Championships and 2023 World Para Ice Hockey Championships, winning silver medals. He graduated from Niagara College.
