= Ralph DeQuebec =

American ice sledge hockey player

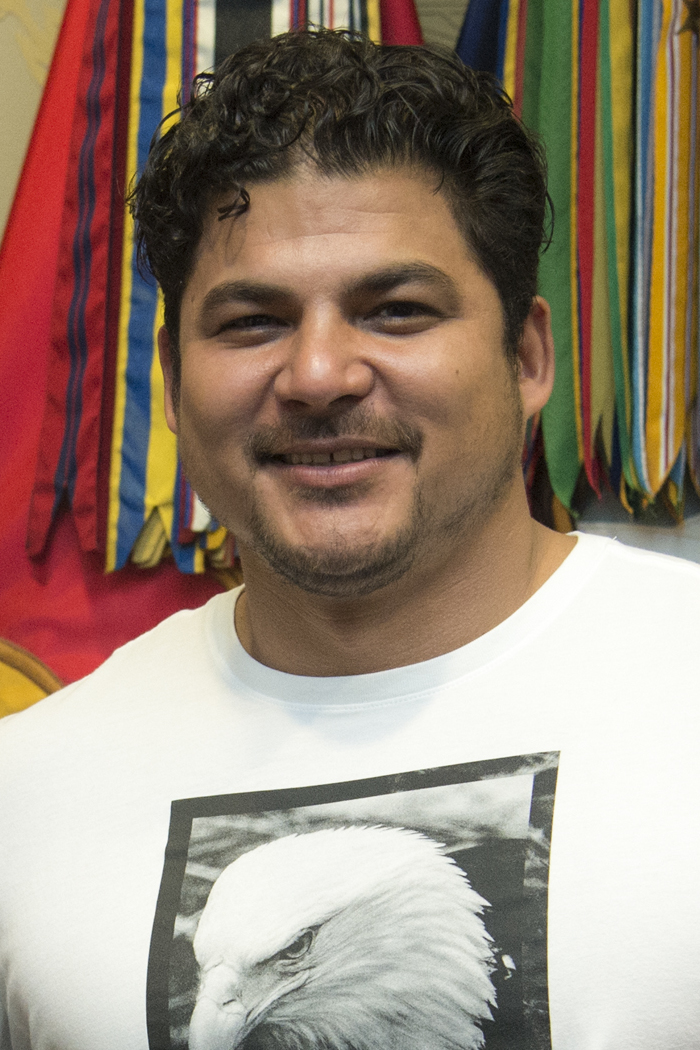
- DeQuebec in 2018
- Born: March 24, 1983 (age 43) Harbor City, California, U.S.
- Position: Defense
- Playing career: 2014–present
Medal record
Para ice hockey
Representing United States
Paralympic Games
Gold medal – first place	2018 PyeongChang	Team competition
Gold medal – first place	2022 Beijing	Team competition
World Championships
Gold medal – first place	2019 Ostrava	Team competition
Gold medal – first place	2021 Ostrava	Team competition

Ralph DeQuebec (born March 24, 1983) is an American ice sled hockey player. DeQuebec made his Winter Paralympics debut during the 2018 Winter Paralympics; winning gold in the mixed tournament.

== Biography ==
DeQuebec served in the United States Marine Corps as an aviation ordnance technician and in explosive ordnance disposal technician. He served during the Iraq War and in Helmand Province, losing both of his legs above the knee and having a partial amputation of his little finger and right thumb from a bomb explosion during the War in Afghanistan.
