= Kyle Zych =

American ice sledge hockey player (born 1996)

Personal information
- Full name: Kyle Zych
- Born: December 9, 1996 (age 29) South Hadley, Massachusetts, U.S.

Sport
- Country: United States
- Sport: Ice sled hockey
- Position: Forward
- Disability: Spina bifida
Medal record
Para ice hockey
Representing United States
Paralympic Games
Gold medal – first place	2022 Beijing	Team competition
World Championships
Gold medal – first place	2019 Ostrava	Team competition
Gold medal – first place	2021 Ostrava	Team competition

Kyle Zych (born December 9, 1996) is an American ice sled hockey player. He was a member of the United States national team that won gold at the 2022 Winter Paralympics.

== Career ==
Zych has been a member of the United States national team since the 2018–19 season. He made his national debut for the United States at the 2019 World Para Ice Hockey Championships and won a gold medal. He represented the United States at the 2022 Winter Paralympics and won a gold medal.
