= Antoine Lehoux =

Canadian ice sledge hockey player

Personal information
- Nationality: Canadian
- Born: October 27, 1993 (age 32)
- Home town: Thetford Mines, Quebec
Medal record
Para ice hockey
Representing Canada
Paralympic Games
Silver medal – second place	2022 Beijing	Team competition

Antoine Lehoux (born October 27, 1993) is a Canadian ice sledge hockey player. He competed at the 2022 Winter Paralympics in Para ice hockey, winning a silver medal.

He was in the Canadian Armed Forces reserves.
