= Adam Kingsmill =

Canadian ice sledge hockey player

Personal information
- Born: March 3, 2000 (age 26) Smithers, British Columbia, Canada

Sport
- Sport: Ice sledge hockey
Medal record
Men's para ice hockey
Representing Canada
Paralympic Games
Silver medal – second place	2022 Beijing	Team competition
Silver medal – second place	2026 Milano Cortina	Team competition
World Championships
Gold medal – first place	2024 Calgary	Team competition
Silver medal – second place	2021 Ostrava	Team competition
Silver medal – second place	2025 Buffalo	Team competition

Adam Kingsmill (born March 3, 2000) is a Canadian ice sledge hockey player. He won silver medals at the 2022 and 2026 Winter Paralympics. He also won a gold medal at the 2024 World Para Ice Hockey Championships.

== Early life ==
Kingsmill was born on March 3, 2000, in Smithers, British Columbia, Canada. Although he was born able-bodied, he lost his right leg below the knee in a lawnmower accident when he was a toddler. Kingsmill used a prosthetic leg growing up, which allowed him to play stand-up minor hockey in 2013, 2014, and 2015. Beyond ice hockey, Kingsmill also participated in motocross racing and finished in the top five at the Pine Valley Motocross Association race in 2014. During the 2015–16 season, Kingsmill was one of 120 prospects invited to participate at the Cariboo Cougars Under-18 AAA club's three-day evaluation camp.

== Career ==
As a result of his tryout for the Cariboo Cougars Under-18 AAA club, Kingsmill was invited to Hockey Canada's NextGen Prospects Camp in 2016. During the NextGen Prospects Camp, Kingsmill tried sledge hockey for the first time as he "never really had the opportunity being from a really small town." Within the year, Kingsmill moved in with a Calgary billet family so he could join the Hockey Canada western training hub. While continuing his sledge hockey training, he enrolled at Mount Royal University to complete his Bachelor of Health and Physical Education with a focus on athletic therapy. As a student, he worked with the National Hockey League's Calgary Flames during their pre-season testing.

Kingsmill made his international sledge hockey debut with Hockey Canada at the 2021 World Para Ice Hockey Championships. He helped Team Canada win a silver medal after losing in the gold medal game to the United States sledge hockey team. Following the loss, Kingsmill was named to the Canadian Paralympic team in September 2021 and he shared goaltending duties with teammate Dominic Larocque throughout the tournament. After meeting the United States again in the gold medal round, Kingsmill and his team earned a silver medal for the second time.

He competed at the 2026 Winter Paralympics and won a silver medal, Canada's third consecutive silver medal in Para ice hockey at the Winter Paralympics.
