= Tian Jintao =

Chinese para ice hockey player

- Born: October 9, 2002 (age 24) Hebei, China
Medal record
Para ice hockey
Representing China
Paralympic Games
Bronze medal – third place	2022 Beijing	Team competition
Bronze medal – third place	2026 Milano Cortina	Team competition

Tian Jintao (born 9 October 2002) is a Chinese para ice hockey player. He represented China at the 2022 Winter Paralympics, where he won a bronze medal in the team event.

== Biography ==
Tian Jintao was born on 9 October 2002 in Hebei, China.

Tian competed as a member of the Chinese national team at the 2022 Winter Paralympics in Beijing. China defeated South Korea 4–0 in the bronze medal game to secure its first Paralympic medal in para ice hockey.

China also competed in the top division of the World Para Ice Hockey Championships during the 2022–2026 Paralympic cycle, finishing fourth in the A-Pool tournaments in 2023, 2024, and 2025.

He later competed with the national team at the 2026 Winter Paralympics. In China's opening game of the tournament, Tian scored a hat-trick in a 12–0 victory over Germany. During the bronze medal game against Czechia, China trailed 2–0 before scoring three unanswered goals to win their second consecutive bronze medal.
