= Joseph Woodke =

American ice sledge hockey player (born 1989)

Personal information
- Born: July 12, 1989 (age 36) Port Hope, Michigan, U.S.

Sport
- Country: United States
- Sport: Ice sled hockey
- Position: Forward
Medal record
Para ice hockey
Representing United States
Paralympic Games
Gold medal – first place	2022 Beijing	Team competition
World Championships
Gold medal – first place	2021 Ostrava	Team competition

Joseph Woodke (born July 12, 1989) is an American ice sled hockey player. He was a member of the United States national team that won gold at the 2022 Winter Paralympics.

== Career ==
Woodke represented the United States at the 2022 Winter Paralympics and won a gold medal.

== Personal life ==
On March 29, 2011, while on foot patrol with the United States Marine Corps in Afghanistan, he stepped on an improvised explosive device. The blast resulted in the loss of both of his legs and damage to his right ear. He spent more than a year and a half at Walter Reed Medical Center recovering.
