= National Indoor Stadium =

Arena located at Olympic Green in Chaoyang, Beijing, China

- Logo of the Stadium

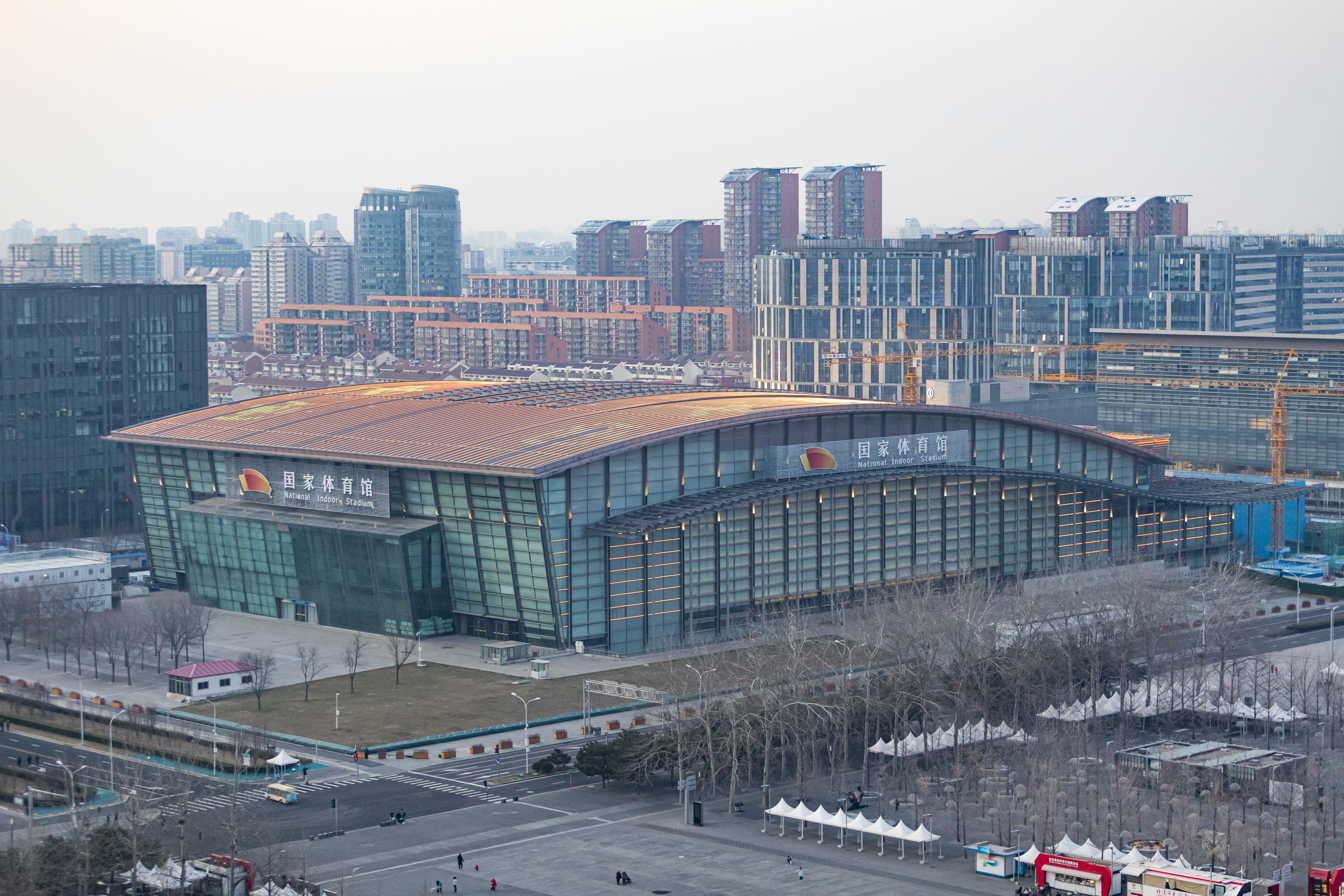
- The stadium in 2019
- Interactive map of National Indoor Stadium
- Location: Olympic Green, Beijing, China
- Coordinates: 39°59′41.21″N 116°23′2.25″E
- Capacity: 18,000 (sometimes with 2,000 temporary stands)
- Surface: Flooring

Construction
- Groundbreaking: May 30, 2005
- Opened: November 26, 2007
- Cost: CNY 650 million USD 95 million EUR 65 million
- Architects: Beijing Institute of Technology Design; Beijing Urban Engineering Design & Research Institute

Website
- nis-cn.com

The National Indoor Stadium (国家体育馆), a.k.a. Folding Fan (折扇), is an arena located at Olympic Green in Chaoyang, Beijing, China.

The stadium has a capacity of 20,000 people, and was constructed for the 2008 Summer Olympics. It is nicknamed the Fan (扇子, shànzi) due to its design resembling a traditional Chinese folding fan.

== History ==
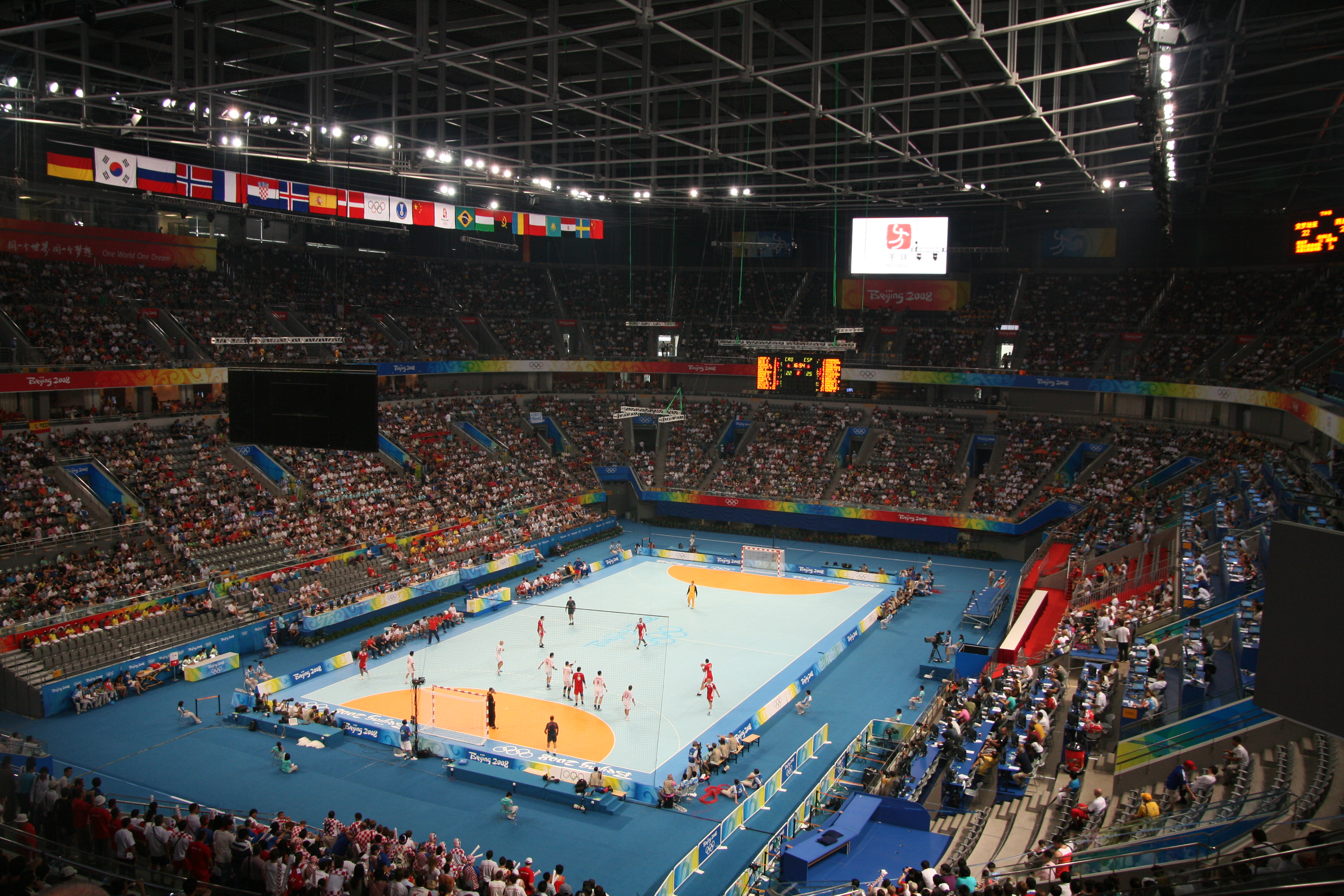
Interior of the stadium. (August 2008)

Glöckner³ designed the indoor stadium, in collaboration with the Beijing Institute of Architectural Design (BIAD), after winning an international architectural competition in October 2003. Construction work began in May 2005. Before that, Cox Architecture were engaged as design consultants. The stadium opened its doors on November 26, 2007, for the artistic Gymnastics test event. It is also used for basketball.

=== Olympics ===
At the 2008 Summer Olympics, it hosted the artistic gymnastics, trampolining, and handball events. After the 2008 Olympics, the stadium is used for sports competition, cultural and entertaining purposes, and serves as a multi-functional exercise center for local residents. In 2015 it hosted the ice hockey women's world championship Beijing 2015. The stadium was used for ice hockey during the 2022 Winter Olympics and Paralympics.

== See also ==
- List of indoor arenas in China
- List of indoor arenas by capacity
