= 2024 Women's World Challenge =

Tournament details
- Host country: Norway
- Venue(s): Fritidspark, Skien
- Dates: 25–28 October
- Teams: 5

Final positions
- Champions: United States (3rd title)
- Runners-up: Canada
- Third place: Team Europe
- Fourth place: Great Britain

Tournament statistics
- Games played: 10
- Goals scored: 65 (6.5 per game)

Official website
- Skien 2024

The 2024 Women's World Challenge was the 3rd edition of this Para Ice Hockey world competition made for women's teams. This tournament acts as the third and final precursor for a fully fledged Women's World Championship in 2025. For the first time, the tournament was held in Europe in Skien, Norway.

United States are the two-time defending champions.

United States won their third title after topping the group.

== Host selection ==
Skien in Norway was given the hosting rights on 20 June 2024.

== Teams ==
Originally, the same four teams were going to take part as the previous two editions. However, on 30 August 2024, Team World was split into two separate teams: Team Europe and Team Pacific.

- Canada
- United States
- (United Kingdom) Great Britain
- Team Europe
- Team Pacific

== Rosters ==
On 17 October 2024, the rosters were confirmed.

== Format ==
The five teams all played each other in a round robin format. The team who won the group would be crowned champions.

== Group stage ==
=== Standings ===
Pos	Team	Pld	W	OTW	OTL	L	GF	GA	GD	Pts
1	United States (C)	4	4	0	0	0	27	0	+27	12
2	Canada	4	3	0	0	1	26	3	+23	9
3	Team Europe	4	2	0	0	2	10	13	−3	6
4	Great Britain	4	1	0	0	3	2	21	−19	3
5	Team Pacific	4	0	0	0	4	0	28	−28	0

Source: Report
Rules for classification: 1) points; 2) head-to-head points; 3) head-to-head goal difference; 4) head-to-head number of goals scored; 5) goal difference.
(C) Champion

=== Match results ===
25 October; 13:30	Team Europe	6–0 (0–0, 2–0, 4–0)	Team Pacific	Fritidspark, Skien

Schrøder (Frydenlund, Kotaja) – 17:49	1−0
Schrøder – 26:05	2−0
Persson (Zidlicka) – 33:00	3−0
Larsen (Zidlicka) – 34:16	4−0
Kotaja (Schrøder, Skjold) – 35:39	5−0
Schrøder (Frydenlund) – 38:55	6−0

4 min
Penalties
6 min

25 October; 17:00	Canada	10–0 (5–0, 4–0, 1–0)	Great Britain	Fritidspark, Skien

Mah – 7:52	1−0
Clements (Frittenburg) – 8:23	2−0
Buchanan – 9:11	3−0
Damley (Vergie) – 12:04	4−0
Clements (Mah) – 13:49	5−0
White (Darnley) – 19:05	6−0
Spong (Darnley) – 20:50	7−0
Picton (King) – 22:36	8−0
Clements – 26:09	9−0
Tousignant (Darnley) – 33:31	10−0

0 min
Penalties
4 min
28
Shots
0

25 October; 20:30	Team Europe	0–8 (0–4, 0–3, 0–1)	United States	Fritidspark, Skien

0−1	00:58 – DeClaudio (Kirkpatrick)
0−2	1:21 – Benassi (Doederlein)
0−3	4:21 – Doederlein (DeClaudio, Kirkpatrick)
0−4	11:18 – DeClaudio
0−5	18:55 – Eberhard (Faherty)
0−6	21:24 – Doederlein (Faherty)
0−7	25:55 – DeClaudio (Herchenroether, Ladlie)
0−8	44:57 – Doederlein (Faherty, Grusse)

2 min
Penalties
0 min
1
Shots
29

26 October; 13:30	Team Pacific	0–12 (0–3, 0–5, 0–4)	Canada	Fritidspark, Skien

0−1	3:42 – White (Darnley, Souveny)
0−2	5:21 – Picton (Spong, Buchanan)
0−3	7:40 – Tousignant
0−4	20:32 – Charron-Pilotte (Picton, Clements)
0−5	21:04 – Spong (Tousignant, Darnley)
0−6	24:47 – Clements (Picton, Frittenburg)
0−7	25:24 – White (Tousignant, Darnley)
0−8	29:50 – Assinck (Buchanan)
0−9	34:57 – Darnley (White, Souveny)
0−10	38:01 – White (Tousignant, Spong)
0−11	42:26 – Frittenburg (King)
0−12	43:19 – Charron-Pilotte (Picton)

4 min
Penalties
0 min

26 October; 17:00	Great Britain	0–7 (0–5, 0–1, 0–1)	United States	Fritidspark, Skien

0−1	4:31 – Hill (Zheng, Eberhard)
0−2	6:38 – Herchenroether (Hill)
0−3	7:29 – DeClaudio (Grusse)
0−4	8:02 – Gallagher (Zheng, McKee)
0−5	8:59 – Doederlein (Faherty)
0−6	15:24 – Faherty (Doederlein)
0−7	37:11 – Zheng (Herchenroether)

27 October; 13:30	Great Britain	1–0 (1–0, 0–0, 0–0)	Team Pacific	Fritidspark, Skien

Couch – 2:07 / 1−0
6 min	Penalties	2 min

27 October; 17:00	Canada	4–0 (1–0, 0–0, 3–0)	Team Europe	Fritidspark, Skien

Clements (Tousignant) – 5:44	1−0
Clements – 33:15?	2−0
Mah (Clements) – 44:19	3−0
Clements (Picton, Mah) – 44:42	4−0

0 min
Penalties
4 min

27 October; 20:30	Team Pacific	0–9 (0–4, 0–2, 0–3)	United States	Fritidspark, Skien

0−1	1:54 – Doederlein (Benassi)
0−2	8:47 – Quimby (Mann, DeClaudio)
0−3	11:43 – Gallagher (Gardner)
0−4	12:37 – Mann (Gallagher, Zheng)
0−5	27:04 – Jamie Benassi (Faherty, Doederlein)
0−6	28:32 – Ladley (DeClaudio)
0−7	30:28 – Gardner (Ladley)
0−8	31:03 – Benassi (Doederlein, Mann)
0−9	41:12 – Eberhard (Gallagher, Zheng)

2 min
Penalties
0 min
0
Shots
36

28 October; 13:30	Great Britain	1–4 (1–4, 0–0, 0–0)	Team Europe	Fritidspark, Skien

	0−1	Schrøder – 4:39
	0−2	Larsen – 7:06
McClean (Quirk) – 9:08	1−2
	1−3	Schrøder (Frydenlund, Springlova) – 13:56
	1−4	Schrøder – 14:49

8 min
Penalties
4 min

28 October; 17:00	United States	3–0 (1–0, 2–0, 0–0)	Canada	Fritidspark, Skien

Kirkpatrick – 3:59	1−0
DeClaudio – 20:02	2−0
DeClaudio – 20:44	3−0

10 min
Penalties
8 min
22
Shots
6

=== Final rankings ===
Rank	Team
Gold medal	United States
Silver medal	Canada
Bronze medal	Team Europe
4	Great Britain
5	Team Pacific

== See also ==
- 2024 World Para Ice Hockey Championships
