= 2022 Women's World Challenge =

Tournament details
- Host country: United States
- Venue(s): Cornerstone Community Center, Green Bay
- Dates: 26 August – 28 September
- Teams: 4

Final positions
- Champions: United States (1st title)
- Runners-up: Canada
- Third place: Team World
- Fourth place: Great Britain

Tournament statistics
- Games played: 8
- Goals scored: 58 (7.25 per game)

Official website
- Green Bay 2022

The 2022 Women's World Challenge (or for sponsorship reasons, the 2022 Women's World Challenge presented by Citi) was the inaugural edition of this Para Ice Hockey world competition made for women's teams. This tournament acts as a precursor for a fully fledged Women's World Championship in 2025. The tournament was held in Green Bay, Wisconsin in the United States. United States won the tournament after beating Canada, 5–1, in the Gold Medal match. While Team World defeated Great Britain 7–0 to secure bronze.

== Host selection ==
For the first edition, Green Bay, in Wisconsin, was given the hosting rights.

== Teams ==
Four teams took part: Canada, United States, Great Britain, Team World.

- Canada
- United States
- Great Britain
- Team World

== Sponsor ==
Citi is the sponsor for the competition.

== Broadcasting rights ==
The games were streamed live on the Green Bay 2022 website, World Para Ice Hockey Facebook page and Paralympics Games YouTube channel.

== Rosters ==
In total, the players came from 7 countries.

=== Canada ===
Head coach: Tara Chrisholm

| No. | Pos. | Name |
|---|---|---|
| 25 | F | Hadley Frittenburg |
| 14 | F | Raphaelle Tousignant |
| 15 | F | Sheena Darnley |
| 9 | D | Mackenzie Spong |
| 18 | F | Aubree Clements |
| 12 | D | Alicia Souveny |
| 71 | D | Emilie Charron-Pilotte |
| 29 | F | Vanessa Racine |
| 23 | F | Hailey King |
| 10 | D | Claire Buchanan |
| 17 | F | Alanna Mah |
| 33 | G | Marie-Eve Croteau |
| 22 | D | Peggy Assinck |
| 8 | D | Meghan Harris |
| 31 | G | Tracey Arnold |
| 16 | D | Hailey Halik |
| 11 | F | Myriam Adam |
| 30 | G | Jessie Gregory |
| 5 | F | Alyssa White |

=== Great Britain ===
Head coach: Ian Offers

| No. | Pos. | Name |
|---|---|---|
| 22 | D | Alysha Tracy Anne Atkinson |
| 6 | F | Shannon Marie Couch |
| 7 | F | Dani Czernuszka-Watts |
| 4 | D | Rae Davis |
| 21 | D | Leanne Emmerson |
| 13 | D | Felicity Elizabeth Anne Gregory |
| 99 | G | Nicole Jodi Hill |
| 87 | F | Sarah Louise Hope |
| 12 | F | Freya Alice Levy |
| 11 | D | Helen Louise McGivern |
| 94 | F | Emily Louise McLean |
| 8 | F | Stacey Quirk |
| 3 | G | Susi Rogers-Hartley |
| 15 | F | Nicola Claire Terrell |

=== United states ===
Head coach: Rose Misiewicz

| No. | Pos. | Name |
|---|---|---|
| 13 | F | Brianna Atkins |
| 44 | F | Jamie Benassi |
| 17 | F | Sarah Bettencourt |
| 30 | G | Hope Bevilhymer |
| 11 | F | Kelsey Lee Diclaudio |
| 15 | F | Lera Doederlein |
| 5 | F | Madison Eberhard |
| 6 | F | Catherine Faherty |
| 83 | F | Madeleine Gallagher |
| 19 | D | Christy Gardner |
| 14 | G | Gabby Graves-Wake |
| 4 | F | Rachel Grusse |
| 36 | F | Kaden Herchenroether |
| 31 | D | Robynne Hill |
| 12 | D | Chloe Kirkpatrick |
| 2 | F | Katie Ladlie |
| 8 | D | Erica McKee |
| 16 | D | Monica Quimby |

=== Team World ===
Head coach: Espen Hedge

| No. | Pos. | Name |
|---|---|---|
| 14 | G | (France) Elisabeth Bisaillon |
| 10 | D | (Germany) Cameon Eisenzimmer |
| 22 | F | (Canada) Amanda Fanizza |
| 4 | F | (Japan) Meika Fujiwara |
| 5 | F | (Latvia) Dina Grinberga |
| 21 | F | (Germany) Isabelle Hogness |
| 16 | D | (Finland) Sanna Koivusalo |
| 1 | G | (Canada) Hope Magelky |
| 7 | D | (Canada) Rebecca Mann |
| 3 | D | (United States) Cindy Ouellet |
| 9 | F | (Sweden) Caroline Persson |
| 23 | F | (Norway) Solvei Skjold |
| 6 | F | (United States) Ai Lin Zheng |

== Referees ==
For the first time ever in an international Para Ice Hockey competition, there was an all-female officiating crew.

Referees
Danielle Williams (CAN)
Jane Ogilvie (CAN)
Rachel Hutchinson (GBR)
Bianca Bartolomei (USA)
Bree Kraut (USA)
Brooke Nunemaker (USA)
Evonne Fix (USA)
Sarah Hickman (USA)

== Format ==
The four teams all played each other in a round robin format. The top two advanced to the final, while bottom 2 played a bronze medal match.

== Group stage ==
=== Standings ===
| Pos | Team | Pld | W | OTW | OTL | L | GF | GA | GD | Pts | Qualification |
|---|---|---|---|---|---|---|---|---|---|---|---|
| 1 | United States (H) | 3 | 3 | 0 | 0 | 0 | 17 | 0 | +17 | 9 | Gold Medal match |
| 2 | Canada | 3 | 2 | 0 | 0 | 1 | 24 | 5 | +19 | 6 | Gold Medal match |
| 3 | Team World | 3 | 1 | 0 | 0 | 2 | 5 | 19 | −14 | 3 | Bronze Medal match |
| 4 | Great Britain | 3 | 0 | 0 | 0 | 3 | 1 | 23 | −22 | 0 | Bronze Medal match |

Rules for classification: 1) points; 2) head-to-head points; 3) head-to-head goal difference; 4) head-to-head number of goals scored; 5) goal difference.
(H) Host

All times are Central Daylight Time (−05:00 GMT).

=== Match results ===
| 26 August 2022; 15:00 | Great Britain | 1–5 (0–1, 0–1, 1–3) | Team World | Cornerstone Ice Arena Rink 3 |

Hill
Goalies
Magelky
Bisaillon

| | 0–1 | 13:13 – pp – Zheng |
| | 0–2 | 23:21 – Persson (Ouellet, Skjold) |
| | 0–3 | 34:20 – Zheng (Ouellet, Mann) |
| | 0–4 | 35:19 – Mann (Zheng) |
| | 0–5 | 38:20 – Mann |
| McLean (Couch, Quirk) – 36:47 | 1–5 |

0 min
Penalties
8 min
7
Shots
24

| 26 August 2022; 18:36 | United States | 5–0 (1–0, 3–0, 1–0) | Canada | Cornerstone Ice Arena Rink 3 |

Graves-Wake, Bevilhymer
Goalies
Arnold

| DiClaudio (Ladlie) – 1:33 | 1–0 |
| Faherty (Doederlein) – 19:42 | 2–0 |
| Eberhard (Faherty) – 20:53 | 3–0 |
| DiClaudio – 22:20 | 4–0 |
| Ladlie (Doederlein) – 42:55 | 5–0 |

4 min
Penalties
6 min
31
Shots
4

| 27 August 2022; 10:00 | Canada | 12–0 (4–0, 4–0, 4–0) | Team World | Cornerstone Ice Arena Rink 3 |

Arnold
Yurczyszyn
Goalies
Magelky

| Mah – 00:34 | 1–0 |
| Tousignant – 1:10 | 2–0 |
| White (Charron-Pilotte) – pp – 13:21 | 3–0 |
| Mah – 14:58 | 4–0 |
| White (Assinck) – 16:14 | 5–0 |
| Tousignant – 23:11 | 6–0 |
| Mah – 23:36 | 7–0 |
| de Boer (Mah) – pp – 29:36 | 8–0 |
| Buchanan – 30:59 | 9–0 |
| Tousignant – sh – 33:41 | 10–0 |
| Mah – 39:42 | 11–0 |
| Clements (Tousignant) – 40:38 | 12–0 |

4 min
Penalties
6 min
25
Shots
4

| 27 August 2022; 13:30 | Canada | 12–0 (4–0, 6–0, 2–0) | Great Britain | Cornerstone Ice Arena Rink 3 |

Yurczyszyn
Goalies
Hill

| Harris (Mah) – 3:59 | 1–0 |
| Tousignant – 4:36 | 2–0 |
| Clements (Tousignant) – pp – 7:38 | 3–0 |
| Myriam Adam – 7:58 | 4–0 |
| Spong (Clements) – sh – 11:58 | 5–0 |
| Assinck – 18:31 | 6–0 |
| White – pp – 19:21 | 7–0 |
| Clements (Hanson) – pp – 21:14 | 8–0 |
| de Boer (Mah) – pp – 25:15 | 9–0 |
| Clements (Mah) – pp – 25:46 | 10–0 |
| Assinck (Frittenburg) – 35:24 | 11–0 |
| Clements (de Boer) – 41:00 | 12–0 |

4 min
Penalties
4 min
46
Shots
2

| 27 August 2022; 17:00 | Team World | 0–6 (0–2, 0–4, 0–0) | United States | Cornerstone Ice Arena Rink 3 |

Bisaillon
Goalies
Bevilhymer

| 0–1 | 9:55 – pp – DiClaudio (Grusse) |
| 0–2 | 14:51 – Hill (Doederlein, Faherty) |
| 0–3 | 16:59 – Doederlein (Herchenroether, Faherty) |
| 0–4 | 18:14 – Gallagher (Hill) |
| 0–5 | 25:56 – Gallagher |
| 0–6 | 29:49 – Gallagher (Benassi) |

2 min
Penalties
4 min
0
Shots
20

| 27 August 2022; 20:30 | Great Britain | 0–6 (0–4, 0–1, 0–1) | United States | Cornerstone Ice Arena Rink 3 |

Hill
Levy
Goalies
Graves-Wake

| 0–1 | 2:21 – Herchenroether |
| 0–2 | 3:12 – Eberhard (DiClaudio) |
| 0–3 | 8:44 Gardner (Faherty) |
| 0–4 | 13:11 – Atkins (Gallagher) |
| 0–5 | 22:14 – Benassi |
| 0–6 | 32:44 – pp – Quimby |

2 min
Penalties
0 min
0
Shots
18

== Knockout stage ==
=== Bronze medal match ===
| 28 August; 11:00 | Team World | 5–0 (3–0, 1–0, 1–0) | Great Britain | Cornerstone Ice Arena Rink 3 |

Bisaillon
Magelky
Goalies
Hall

| Zheng. (Mann) – pp – 6:08 | 1–0 |
| Mann (Grinberga) – pp – 6:26 | 2–0 |
| Zheng (Ouellet) – 14:02 | 3–0 |
| Ouellet (Mann, Zheng) – 20:26 | 4–0 |
| Mann (Zheng) – 32:00 | 5–0 |

2 min
Penalties
6 min
12
Shots
3

=== Gold medal match ===
| 28 August; 15:00 | Canada | 1–5 (1–4, 0–0, 0–1) | United States | Cornerstone Ice Arena Rink 3 |

Arnold
Goalies
Bevilhymer

| | 0–1 | 00:49 – Ladlie (DiClaudio) |
| | 0–2 | 3:51 – Ladlie (McKee, DiClaudio) |
| Tousignant – 5:34 | 1–2 |
| | 1–3 | 12:23 – Doederlein (Faherty) |
| | 1–4 | 13:33 – pp – Faherty (McKee, DiClaudio) |
| | 1–5 | 34:30 – Faherty (Doederlein, Eberhard) |

12 min
Penalties
12 min
4
Shots
20

=== Final rankings ===
| Rank | Team |
|---|---|
| Gold medal | United States |
| Silver medal | Canada |
| Bronze medal | Team World |
| 4 | Great Britain |

== See also ==
- Para ice hockey at the 2022 Winter Paralympics
