= 2025 Women's World Para Ice Hockey Championships =

- Women's World Para Ice Hockey Championships 2025 in Dolný Kubín logo

Tournament details
- Host country: Slovakia
- Venue(s): Dolný Kubín Winter Stadium, Dolný Kubín, Slovakia
- Dates: 26–31 August 2025
- Teams: 6

Final positions
- Champions: United States (1st title)
- Runners-up: Canada
- Third place: Norway
- Fourth place: Great Britain

Tournament statistics
- Games played: 11
- Goals scored: 85 (7.73 per game)
- Attendance: 3,222 (293 per game)
- Scoring leader: Kelsey DiClaudio (15 points)

Awards
- MVP: (United States) Kelsey DiClaudio

Official website
- Dolny-Kubin 2025

The 2025 Women's World Para Ice Hockey Championships was the inaugural Women's World Para Ice Hockey Championships for women's national para ice hockey teams. The tournament was held from 26–31 August 2025, at Dolný Kubín Winter Stadium in Dolný Kubín, Slovakia.

The United States won their first title, defeating Canada 7–1 in the final. Norway defeated Great Britain for the bronze medal.

== Host selection ==
On 13 June 2024, World Para Ice Hockey launched the bidding process for the numerous major competitions, including this championship. On 9 March 2025, Slovakia was given the hosting rights in Dolný Kubín as the host venue.

=== Quotes ===
“We are thrilled to welcome the first-ever World Para Ice Hockey Women's Championships to Dolny Kubin. This will be a game-changer for the future of our sport, and we anticipate the reaction from our community to be incredibly supportive. With the ultimate goal of expanding female participation in Para ice hockey worldwide and applying for a women’s medal event to be considered for potential inclusion on a future edition of the Paralympic Winter Games programme, this is a landmark announcement for the sport.”

— Michelle Laflamme, World Para Ice Hockey Senior Manager.

“It is very important for the Paralympic Movement to have strong female representation, and the evolution of women’s Para ice hockey is a testimony to the transformative and inclusive power of Para sport. Two years ago, World Para Ice Hockey won the IPC International Women’s Day Recognition Awards in the International Federation category for their fantastic work in growing female participation in all areas of the game, on and off the ice. The Women's World Championships is a major milestone in that process, and I hope to see more and more nations joining women’s Para ice hockey in the near future.”

— Andrew Parsons, International Paralympic Committee president.

"We are incredibly proud that Slovakia will host the first-ever World Para Ice Hockey Women's World Championships. Dolny Kubin has long been a hub for Para ice hockey development, and welcoming the world's top female athletes to compete here is a historic moment for the sport. This championships is a testament to the rapid growth of women's Para ice hockey and a crucial step toward greater inclusion and recognition on the global stage. We look forward to an inspiring tournament that will showcase talent, determination, and the power of sport to break barriers."

— Maros Cambal, chief executive officer of the Slovak Paralympic Committee.

== Preparations ==
World Para Ice Hockey inspected the venue on 4 April 2025. Norway and Great Britain both took part in a training camp before the tournament.

== Teams ==
Six teams are going to take part. Australia and Norway are making their debuts at the women's para ice hockey tournament, while the other four teams have participated in all three editions of the Women's World Challenge.

Team	Ref
Australia	
Canada	
Great Britain	
Norway	
United States	
Team World	

== Venue ==
The venue is the Dolný Kubín Winter Stadium in Dolný Kubín. The city has hosted a series of World Para Ice Hockey Development Camps and friendly Para ice hockey tournaments such as the Slovakia Cup.

2025 Women's World Para Ice Hockey Championships is located in Slovakia	Dolný Kubín
2025 Women's World Para Ice Hockey Championships is located in Slovakia	Dolný Kubín Winter Stadium
2025 Women's World Para Ice Hockey Championships is located in Slovakia	Capacity: 300

== Referees ==
For the first time, an all female cohort of referees were chosen for the tournament.

Referees
(United Kingdom) Philippa MacKinnon
(United States) Rachel Hutchinson
(United States) Melissa Sweers
Linesmen
(Canada) Shadei Said
(France) Anne-Sophie Boniface
(United States) Brooke Nuemaker
(United States) Evonne Fix
(Slovakia) Eva Molekova
(Czech Republic) Katerina Peskova

== Preliminary round ==
- All times local (UTC+2)
- The schedule was announced on 25 July 2025.

=== Group A ===
Pos	Team	Pld	W	OTW	OTL	L	GF	GA	GD	Pts	Qualification
1	United States	2	2	0	0	0	18	0	+18	6	Semifinals
2	Norway	2	1	0	0	1	7	10	−3	3	Semifinals
3	Australia	2	0	0	0	2	0	15	−15	0	5th place game

Source: Dolný Kubín 2025

26 August; 16:00	Australia	0–8 (0–6, 0–1, 0–1)	United States	Dolný Kubín Winter Stadium; Attendance: 288

Erika Gosney
Goalies
Hope Magelky
Referee:
Philippa MacKinnon
Linesmen:
Anne-Sophie Boniface
Eva Moleková

0–1	00:13 – DiClaudio (Herchenroether)
0–2	4:48 – DiClaudio (Herchenroether)
0–3	9:07 – Doederlein (Faherty, Benassi)
0–4	9:51 – Benassi (Doederlein, Gallagher)
0–5	10:41 – Zheng
0–6	12:29 – Eberhard (Benassi, Doederlein)
0–7	24:33 – Steffen (Zheng)
0–8	34:31 – Quimby (Zheng)

0 min
Penalties
0 min
0
Shots
31

27 August; 16:00	Norway	7–0 (6–0, 1–0, 0–0)	Australia	Dolný Kubín Winter Stadium; Attendance: 281

Stine Frydenlund
Kristina Iversen
Goalies
Erika Gosney
Referee:
Rachel Hutchinson
Linesmen:
Brooke Nunemaker
Kateřina Pešková

Schrøder (Reite) – 00:12	1–0
Schrøder (Halvorsrud) – 1:00	2–0
Schrøder – 1:34	3–0
Norheim (Schrøder) – 5:09	4–0
Larsen (Norheim) – 13:48	5–0
Fiskerud (Schrøder) – 14:15	6–0
Reite (Norheim) – 24:08	7–0

0 min
Penalties
0 min
31
Shots
0

28 August; 16:00	United States	10–0 (6–0, 0–0, 4–0)	Norway	Dolný Kubín Winter Stadium; Attendance: 108

Gabby Graves-Wake
Hope Magelky
Goalies
Stine Frydenlund
Referee:
Philippa MacKinnon
Linesmen:
Anne-Sophie Boniface
Eva Moleková

Ladlie (DiClaudio, Doederlein) – 1:56	1–0
DiClaudio (Grusse) – 7:58	2–0
Doederlein (Grusse, Herchenroether) – 10:53	3–0
DiClaudio (Herchenroether, McKee) – pp – 12:23	4–0
Grusse (Benassi, Faherty) – 12:58	5–0
DiClaudio (Quimby) – 14:56	6–0
Doederlein – 30:45	7–0
Herchenroether (DiClaudio) – 31:01	8–0
Faherty – ps – 32:06	9–0
Grusse (Doederlein) – 33:03	10–0

2 min
Penalties
8 min
27
Shots
2

=== Group B ===
Pos	Team	Pld	W	OTW	OTL	L	GF	GA	GD	Pts	Qualification
1	Canada	2	2	0	0	0	17	0	+17	6	Semifinals
2	Great Britain	2	1	0	0	1	2	8	−6	3	Semifinals
3	Team World	2	0	0	0	2	1	12	−11	0	5th place game

Source: Dolný Kubín 2025

26 August; 19:30	Team World	0–10 (0–2, 0–6, 0–2)	Canada	Dolný Kubín Winter Stadium; Attendance: 422

Meranda Reast
Goalies
Maggie Manning
Referee:
Rachel Hutchinson
Linesmen:
Brooke Nunemaker
Kateřina Pešková

0–1	00:18 – Tousignant (Mah, Picton)
0–2	00:34 – Tousignant (Mah)
0–3	16:41 – Charron-Pilotte (Buchanan)
0–4	16:54 – White
0–5	20:39 – Mah (Buchanan, Assinck)
0–6	21:57 – Tousignant
0–7	25:05 – Buchanan (Assinck)
0–8	26:19 – White
0–9	31:57 – White (Clements)
0–10	41:44 – Assinck (Picton)

2 min
Penalties
2 min
0
Shots
39

27 August; 19:30	Great Britain	2–1 (1–1, 1–0, 0–0)	Team World	Dolný Kubín Winter Stadium; Attendance: 390

Nicole Hill
Goalies
Meranda Reast
Referee:
Melissa Sweers
Linesmen:
Evonne Fix
Eva Moleková

Gregory (Quirk) – pp – 1:50	1–0
	1–1	11:47 – Fukunishi (Kim)
Gregory (Couch) – 16:21	2–1

4 min
Penalties
8 min
12
Shots
13

28 August; 19:30	Canada	7–0 (6–0, 1–0, 0–0)	Great Britain	Dolný Kubín Winter Stadium; Attendance: 287

Maggie Manning
Goalies
Davina Hall
Referee:
Melissa Sweers
Linesmen:
Evonne Fix
Kateřina Pešková

Darnley (Clements) – 2:20	1–0
Spong (Vergie) – 4:29	2–0
Picton (Clements) – 5:11	3–0
Frittenburg (Tousignant) – 5:46	4–0
Clements – 7:17	5–0
Vergie (Tousignant) – 9:04	6–0
Picton (Clements) – sh – 20:29	7–0

6 min
Penalties
4 min
14
Shots
1

== Knockout stage ==
=== Bracket ===
Semifinals
30 August
United States	10
Great Britain	0
30 August
Canada	7
Norway	0

Final
31 August
United States	7
Canada	1
Third place
31 August
Norway	6
Great Britain	0

=== Fifth place game ===
30 August; 12:30	Team World	9–0 (2–0, 4–0, 3–0)	Australia	Dolný Kubín Winter Stadium; Attendance: 248

Meranda Reast
Anne Buisson
Goalies
Erika Gosney
Bridgett McDonald
Referee:
Philippa MacKinnon
Linesmen:
Evonne Fix
Brooke Nunemaker

Fukunishi (Grīnberga, Hozáková) – 2:55	1–0
Kim (Židlická, Persson) – 9:25	2–0
Grīnberga (Fukunishi, Hozáková) – 19:01	3–0
Kim (Persson) – 26:03	4–0
Fukunishi (Grīnberga, Müggenburg) – 27:39	5–0
Kim – 29:37	6–0
Fukunishi (Kovaříčková) – 30:40	7–0
Persson (Hozáková) – 31:02	8–0
Grīnberga (Židlická, Hozáková) – 43:34	9–0

0 min
Penalties
2 min
34
Shots
0

=== Semifinals ===
30 August; 16:00	Canada	7–0 (3–0, 1–0, 3–0)	Norway	Dolný Kubín Winter Stadium; Attendance: 203

Jessie Gregory
Goalies
Stine Frydenlund
Referee:
Melissa Sweers
Linesmen:
Anne-Sophie Boniface
Kateřina Pešková

Tousignant (Picton) – pp – 1:00	1–0
Mah (Tousignant) – sh – 8:45	2–0
White (Mah) – 13:49	3–0
White (Tousignant, Mah) – pp – 25:01	4–0
Darnley (Clements) – 32:28	5–0
White (Tousignant) – 41:37	6–0
Mah – 43:23	7–0

4 min
Penalties
4 min
23
Shots
5

30 August; 19:30	United States	10–0 (6–0, 2–0, 2–0)	Great Britain	Dolný Kubín Winter Stadium; Attendance: 222

Gabby Graves-Wake
Hope Magelky
Goalies
Nicole Hill
Davina Hall
Referee:
Rachel Hutchinson
Linesmen:
Evonne Fix
Eva Moleková

Faherty (Doederlein) – 00:16	1–0
Herchenroether (McKee, Kirkpatrick) – 7:31	2–0
Gallagher (Mann) – 8:52	3–0
Zheng – 9:24	4–0
DiClaudio (McKee) – 10:36	5–0
DiClaudio (Quimby, Zheng) – pp – 13:33	6–0
Hill (Gallagher) – 16:23	7–0
Doederlein – 29:18	8–0
Quimby (DiClaudio) – 36:45	9–0
Gallagher – 44:57	10–0

2 min
Penalties
2 min
31
Shots
0

=== Bronze medal game ===
31 August; 15:30	Norway	6–0 (4–0, 0–0, 2–0)	Great Britain	Dolný Kubín Winter Stadium; Attendance: 236

Stine Frydenlund
Goalies
Nicole Hill
Referee:
Philippa MacKinnon
Linesmen:
Anne-Sophie Boniface
Evonne Fix

Schrøder (Larsen) – 1:41	1–0
Schrøder – 3:55	2–0
Schrøder – 7:04	3–0
Larsen (Schrøder) – 14:19	4–0
Larsen – 30:22	5–0
Schrøder (Larsen, Ystebø) – 38:08	6–0

4 min
Penalties
0 min
23
Shots
3

=== Gold medal game ===
31 August; 19:00	United States	7–1 (1–0, 4–0, 2–1)	Canada	Dolný Kubín Winter Stadium; Attendance: 537

Gabby Graves-Wake
Goalies
Jessie Gregory
Referee:
Rachel Hutchinson
Linesmen:
Eva Moleková
Kateřina Pešková

DiClaudio – 13:29	1–0
Faherty (DiClaudio, Hill) – 18:47	2–0
Benassi (Doederlein) – 19:04	3–0
DiClaudio (Doederlein) – 25:12	4–0
DiClaudio – 25:52	5–0
	5–1	34:13 – pp – Mah (Clements)
Herchenroether – 40:56	6–1
DiClaudio (Gallagher) – 43:45	7–1

10 min
Penalties
4 min
38
Shots
11

== See also ==
- 2025 World Para Ice Hockey Championships
