= 2023 Women's World Challenge =

Tournament details
- Host country: United States
- Venue(s): Cornerstone Community Center, Green Bay
- Dates: 31 August – 3 September
- Teams: 4

Final positions
- Champions: United States (2nd title)
- Runners-up: Canada
- Third place: Team World
- Fourth place: Great Britain

Tournament statistics
- Games played: 8
- Goals scored: 47 (5.88 per game)

Official website
- Green Bay 2023

The 2023 Women's World Challenge (or for sponsorship reasons, the 2023 Women's World Challenge presented by Citi) was the 2nd edition of this Para Ice Hockey world competition made for women's teams. This tournament acts as a precursor for a fully fledged Women's World Championship in 2025. For the second time, the tournament was held in Green Bay, Wisconsin in the United States. United States were the defending champions and successfully defended their title after beating Canada, 2–0, in the Gold Medal match. While Team World defeated Great Britain 7–0 to claim bronze.

== Host selection ==
Green Bay, in Wisconsin, was given the hosting rights after holding the inaugural edition in 2022.

== Teams ==
Originally, five teams were going to take part: Canada, United States, Great Britain, Team Europe and Team Asia.

As there were problems related to logistics and other issues, the Asia team could not be formed, so the World Team with the remaining players was formed again.

- Canada
- United States
- (United Kingdom) Great Britain
- Team World

== Sponsor ==
Just like in 2022, Citi is the sponsor for the competition.

== Broadcasting rights ==
The games were streamed live on the Green Bay 2023 website, World Para Ice Hockey Facebook page and Paralympics Games YouTube channel.

== Rosters ==
In total, the players came from 11 countries.

=== Canada ===
Head coach: Tara Chrisholm

No.	Pos.	Name
25	F	Hadley Frittenburg
14	F	Raphaelle Tousignant
15	F	Sheena Darnley
9	D	Mackenzie Spong
18	F	Aubree Clements
12	D	Alicia Souveny
71	D	Emilie Charron-Pilotte
29	F	Vanessa Racine
23	F	Hailey King
10	D	Claire Buchanan
17	F	Alanna Mah
33	G	Marie-Eve Croteau
22	D	Peggy Assinck
8	D	Meghan Harris
31	G	Tracey Arnold
16	D	Hailey Halik
11	F	Myriam Adam
30	G	Jessie Gregory
5	F	Alyssa White

=== Great Britain ===
Head coach: Ian Offers

No.	Pos.	Name
21	D	Leanne Emmerson
13	F	Felicity Elizabeth Anne Gregory
22	D	Alysha Tracy Anne Atkinson
12	F	Freya Alice Levy
15	D	Nicola Claire Terrell
6	F	Shannon Marie Couch
8	F	Stacey Quirk
7	F	Dani Czernuszka-Watts
94	F	Emily Louise McLean
87	D	Sarah Louise Hope
33	G	Nicole Jodi Hill
11	D	Helen Louise McGivern
3	G	Susi Rogers-Hartley

=== United States ===
Head coach: Rose Misiewicz

No.	Pos.	Name
11	F	Kelsey Lee Diclaudio
12	D	Chloe Kirkpatrick
17	F	Sarah Bettencourt
31	D	Robynne Hill
44	F	Jamie Benassi
36	F	Kaden Herchenroether
13	F	Brianna Atkins
4	F	Rachel Grusse
33	G	Hope Magelky
14	G	Gabby Graves-Wake
19	D	Christy Gardner
30	G	Hope Bevilhymer
83	F	Madeleine Gallagher
16	D	Monica Quimby
6	F	Catherine Faherty
7	F	Rebecca Mann
15	F	Lera Doederlein
2	F	Katie Ladlie

=== Team World ===
Head coach: (Norway) Espen Hegde

No.	Pos.	Name
2	D	(Norway) Lena Schroeder
9		(Norway) Maren Norheim
23	F	(Norway) Solvei Harila Skjold
16	F	(Finland) Sanna Koivusalo
5	F	(France) Anne Buisson
22	F	(Latvia) Dina Grīnberga
8	F	(Czech Republic) Anna Špringlová
7	GK	(Germany) Meranda Reast
4	F	(Japan) Meika Fujiwara
10	F	(Sweden) Caroline Persson
1	GK	(Canada) Élisabeth Bisaillon
6	F	(Canada) Amanda Fanizza
3	F	(United States) Isabelle Hogness
21	D	(United States) Ailin Zheng
14	D	(Canada) Tuyet Yurczyszyn
15	D	(United States) Rachel Steffen
17	GK	(United States) Lynsey Warne

== Format ==
The four teams all played each other in a round robin format. The top two advanced to the final, while bottom 2 played a bronze medal match.

== Group stage ==
=== Standings ===
Pos	Team	Pld	W	OTW	OTL	L	GF	GA	GD	Pts	Qualification
1	United States (H)	3	3	0	0	0	17	0	+17	9	Gold Medal match
2	Canada	3	2	0	0	1	13	5	+8	6	Gold Medal match
3	Team World	3	1	0	0	2	7	12	−5	3	Bronze Medal match
4	Great Britain	3	0	0	0	3	1	21	−20	0	Bronze Medal match

Rules for classification: 1) points; 2) head-to-head points; 3) head-to-head goal difference; 4) head-to-head number of goals scored; 5) goal difference.
(H) Host

All times are Central Daylight Time (–05:00 GMT).

31 August; 15:00	Team World	5–1 (1–1, 1–0, 3–0)	Great Britain	Cornerstone Ice Arena Rink 3

Game reference

Elisabeth Bisaillon
Goalies
Nicole Jodi Hill

	0–1	06:10 – Quirk, (Mclean)
Zheng, (Steffen) – 11:23	1–1
Norheim, (Grinberga) – 19:35	2–1
Schroeder, (Persson) – 31:38	3–1
Schroeder, Grinberga) – 35:27	4–1
Persson, (Zheng) – 35:54	5–1

0 min
Penalties
4 min
14
Shots
6

31 August; 18:30	Canada	0–3 (0–2, 0–1, 0–0)	United States	Cornerstone Ice Arena Rink 3

Game reference

Jessie Gregory
Goalies
Gabby Graves Wake, Hope Bevilhymer

0–1	08:24 – Diclaudio, (Faherty, Grusse)
0–2	08:47 – Doederlein (unassisted)
0–3	21:26 – Faherty, (Benassi)

6 min
Penalties
8 min
2
Shots
25

1 September; 15:00	Canada	4–2 (1–0, 2–0, 1–2)	Team World	Cornerstone Ice Arena Rink 3

Game reference

Tracey Arnold
Goalies
Lynsey Warne

Clements, (Tousignant) – 07:43	1–0
Tousignant, (Mah, Buchanan) 24:46	2–0
White, (Mah) – 25:01	3–0
	3–1	31:25 – Schroeder (unassisted)
	3–2	38:00 – Schroeder (unassisted)
Tousignant, (White, Mah) – 44:06	4–2

2 min
Penalties
4 min
16
Shots
8

1 September; 18:30	United States	7–0 (4–0, 2–0, 1–0)	Great Britain	Cornerstone Ice Arena Rink 3

Game reference

Hope Bevilhymer, Nicole Jodi Hill
Goalies
Susi Rogers-Hartley, Hope Magelky

Faherty, (Doederlein, Kirkpatrick) – 00:32	1–0
Herchenroether, (Quimby) – 00:48	2–0
Herchenroether, (Grusse – 02:05	3–0
Atkins, (Grusse, Faherty) – 06:55	4–0
Gallagher, (Herchenroether, Quimby) – 15:49	5–0
Benassi, (Doederlein, Mann) – 17:21	6–0
Quimby, (Gallagher) – 44:08	7–0

4 min
Penalties
0 min
22
Shots
0

2 September; 15:00	Great Britain	0–9 (0–6, 0–1, 0–2)	Canada	Cornerstone Ice Arena Rink 3

Game reference

Susi Rogers-Hartley
Goalies
Tracey Arnold, Marie-Eve Croteau

0–1	00:38 – Tousignant (unassisted)
0–2	04:35 – Mah, (Tousignant)
0–3	07:30 – Tousignant (unassisted)
0–4	08:27 – Racine, (Adam)
0–5	09:33 – White (unassisted)
0–6	14:33 – Racine (unassisted)
0–7	15:50 – White, (Assnick)
0–8	42:32 – Adam, (White)
0–9	44:29 – Racine, (Adam)

0 min
Penalties
10 min
0
Shots
29

2 September; 18:30	Team World	0–7 (0–4, 0–2, 0–1)	United States	Cornerstone Ice Arena Rink 3

Game reference

Meranda Reast
Goalies
Gabby Graves-Wake, Hope Bevilhymer

0–1	00:16 – Faherty, (Doederlein)
0–2	00:33 – Doederlein (unassisted)
0–3	02:52 – Gallagher, (Quimby, Faherty)
0–4	03:40 – Herchenroether, (Atkins)
0–5	15:14 – Benassi, (Doederlein, Faherty)
0–6	22:07 – Hill, (Benassi, Doederlein)
0–7	35:46 – Gallagher (unassisted)

0 min
Penalties
6 min
1
Shots
19

== Knockout stage ==
=== Bronze medal match ===
3 September; 11:00	Team World	7–0 (2–0, 1–0, 4–0)	Great Britain	Cornerstone Ice Arena Rink 3

Game reference

Lynsey Warne, Meranda Reast, Elisabeth Bisaillon
Goalies
Nicole Jodi Hill

Zheng (unassisted) – 07:08	1–0
Schroeder, (Grinberga) – 10:06	2–0
Ailin Zheng, (Persson) – 15:21	3–0
Fujiwara, (Grinberga, Norheim) – 31:33	4–0
Steffen, (Springlova, Yurczyszyn) – 37:53	5–0
Zheng, (Schroeder) – 40:06	6–0
Grinberga, (Schroeder, Norheim) – 43:18	7–0

6 min
Penalties
0 min
23
Shots
7

=== Gold medal match ===
3 September; 15:00	United States	2–0 (0–0, 1–0, 1–0)	Canada	Cornerstone Ice Arena Rink 3

Game reference
Hope Bevilhymer, Hope Magelky, Gabby Graves-Wake	Goalies	Jessie Gregory
Diclaudio (unassisted) – 17:35 / 1–0; Doederlein, (Robynne Hill) – 39:56 / 2–0
8 min	Penalties	6 min
25	Shots	1

=== Final rankings ===
Rank	Team
Gold medal	United States
Silver medal	Canada
Bronze medal	Team World
4	Great Britain

== See also ==
- 2023 World Para Ice Hockey Championships
