= Tuyet Morris Yurczyszyn =

Canadian ice sledge hockey player

- Born: August 6, 1966 (age 60) Vietnam
- Position: Forward
- OSHA team: Brant County Crushers
- National team: Canada
- Playing career: 2012–present
Medal record
Representing Canada
Women's National Ice sledge hockey
IPC Ice Sledge Hockey Women's International Cup
Silver medal – second place	2014 Canada	Tournament

Tuyet Morris Yurczyszyn (born August 6, 1966) is an athlete that participates in women's ice sledge hockey. A member of the Canada women's national ice sledge hockey team since 2012, she competed in the first-ever IPC Ice Sledge Hockey Women's International Cup in 2014.

== Playing career ==
Having had polio as a child, she wears a leg brace. When she is not competing with the national team, her club team is the Brant County Crushers, which compete in the Ontario Sledge Hockey Association. Having also played with her on the national team, Jessie Gregory is one of her teammates on the Crushers.

=== Canada Women's National Sled Hockey Team ===
Competing at the IPC Ice Sledge Hockey Women's International Cup from November 7–9, 2014 in Brampton, Ontario, Canada, she was among Canada's leaders in assists, compiling four. She would log three assists in Game 2 of the event, including an assist on Danica McPhee's first-ever international goal.

== Personal ==
She served as one of the community torch bearers on June 19, 2015, during the torch relay for the 2015 Pan American Games.
