= Lynda Holt =

Australian Paralympic athlete

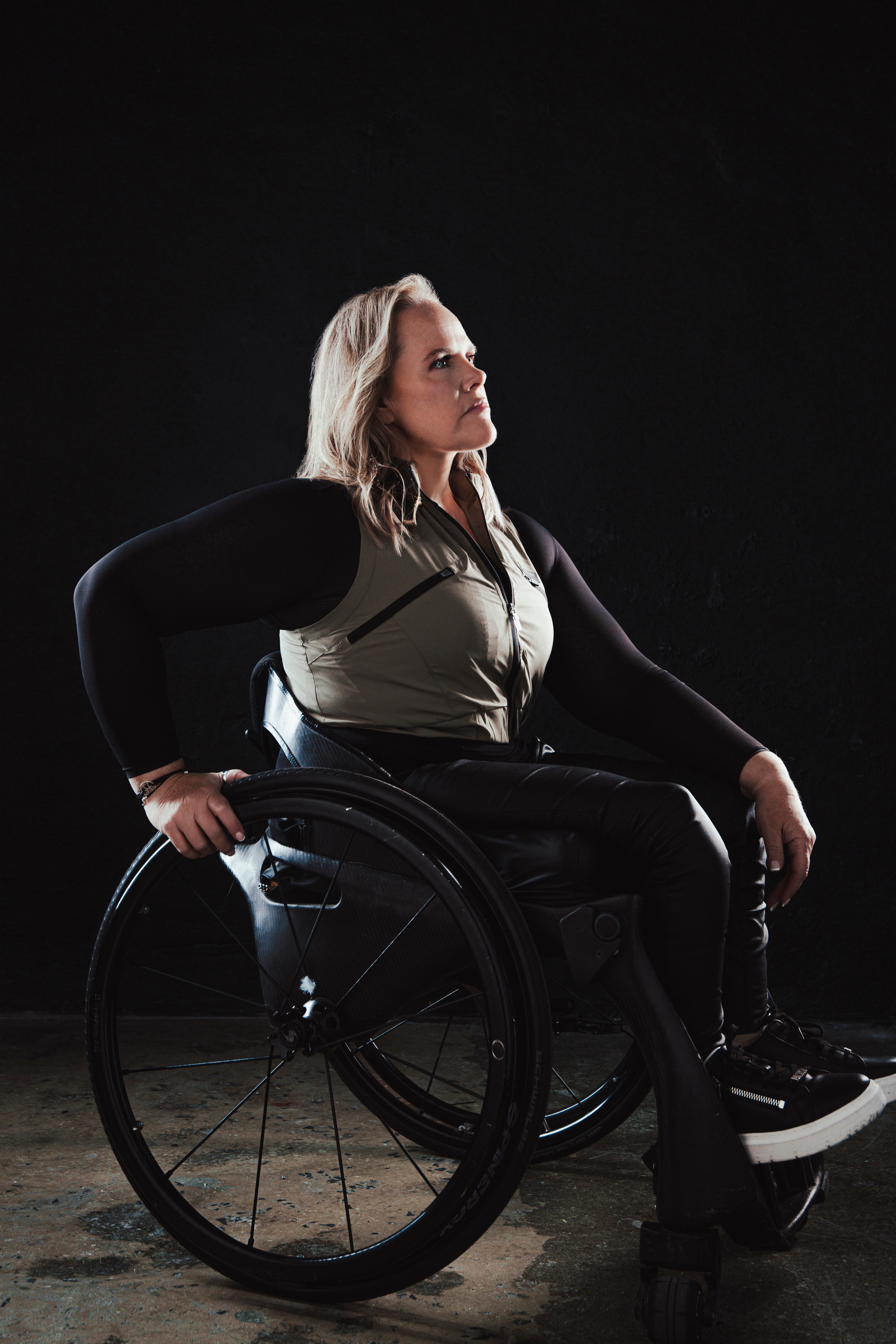
- Holt competing in discus at the 2000 Summer Paralympics in Sydney

Personal information
- Nationality: Australia
- Born: 9 March 1972 (age 54) Perth
Medal record
Athletics
Paralympic Games
Silver medal – second place	2000 Sydney	Women's shot put F55
IPC Athletics World Championships
Bronze medal – third place	1998 Birmingham	Women's Shot Put F55
Bronze medal – third place	1998 Birmingham	Women's Discus F55

Lynda Holt (born 9 March 1972) is an Australian Paralympic athlete. She won a silver medal at the 2000 Sydney Paralympic Games in the Women's Shot Put F55 event. In 2020, Holt decided to re-enter the sporting arena as a para ice hockey player after her athletics retirement in 2002. She is a disability advocate and entrepreneur.

== Personal ==
Lynda Holt (born 9 March 1972) is an Australian Paralympic athlete, disability advocate, entrepreneur and model. She was born in Perth, Western Australia and grew up in Perth with one sister. Holt was born with spina bifida and began using a wheelchair full time at the age of ten.

In 1979 Holt was named the Telethon Child for the annual Channel 7 Telethon fundraiser supporting children with disabilities.

Holt later became involved in disability advocacy and business initiatives aimed at improving independence and accessibility for people with disabilities. She is the founder of Wheelie Essential, an assistive technology and disability lifestyle brand created to provide practical products and solutions for wheelchair users and people with mobility impairments.

In addition to her work in assistive technology, Holt works as a travel advisor specialising in accessible travel planning through iTravel. She also provides accessible travel information and resources through the Wheelie Essential platform.

== Competitive Athletics Career ==
Holt began participating in wheelchair sport at the age of nine. During this time she met fellow Australian Paralympic athlete Louise Sauvage, who competed in the same classification during early competitions.

Initially, Holt tried several sports, including athletics, swimming, wheelchair basketball, slalom and track racing before focusing on the field events of shot put and discus.She competed in her first national championships in Adelaide, South Australia in 1981 and continued to compete in national championships across Australia throughout her teenage years. Holt first represented Australia internationally in 1988 as part of a junior athletics team that travelled to the United States to compete in East Tennessee.

At the 1998 IPC Athletics World Championships in Birmingham, England, she won two bronze medals: Women's Shot Put F55 with a throw of 6.48 m and Women's Discus with a throw of 18.96 m.

In preparation for the 2000 Sydney Paralympics, Holt trained up to twelve sessions per week while also maintaining full-time employment. At the Sydney Games she won the silver medal in the Women's Shot Put F55 with a throw of 7.03 m. She finished tenth in the Women's Discus F58 with a throw of 20.94 m; she was the second ranked F55 thrower but finished tenth due to classifications being merged.

Her coach throughout much of her athletics career was Frank Ponta, who coached her through to the Sydney Paralympics and until her retirement from athletics in 2002.

== Para Ice Hockey Career ==
Holt returned to competitive sport in 2019 after attending a come and try day that involved para ice hockey. She joined the Newcastle Northstars para ice hockey team.

She represented Australia in international competitions and served as vice‑captain of the Australian women's national team that travelled to Slovakia to compete in the inaugural 2025 Women's World Para Ice Hockey Championships. She is part of the Australian team for the 2026 Women's World Para Ice Hockey Championships in Newcastle.

== Entrepreneurship And Advocacy ==
Outside of sport, Holt is known for her work as a disability advocate and entrepreneur. She founded Wheelie Essential, a disability lifestyle and assistive technology brand designed to provide practical products and resources for wheelchair users and people with mobility disabilities. Holt is also active in the accessible travel sector, helping travellers with disabilities navigate accessibility considerations and travel logistics through both iTravel and the Wheelie Essential platform.

== Modelling And Media ==
Holt also works as a disability model advocating for greater representation of people with disabilities in fashion, advertising and media. She is represented by the modelling agency ZBD Talent.
