= Christy Gardner =

- Born: Lewiston, Maine, U.S.
- Position: Forward
- National team: United States
- Playing career: 2011–present
Medal record
Women's ice sledge hockey
Representing United States
Women's International Cup
Gold medal – first place	2014 Brampton	Tournament

Christy Gardner

Military service
- Allegiance: United States
- Branch/service: United States Army
- Years of service: 2005-2007
- Rank: Sergeant
- Unit: Military Police

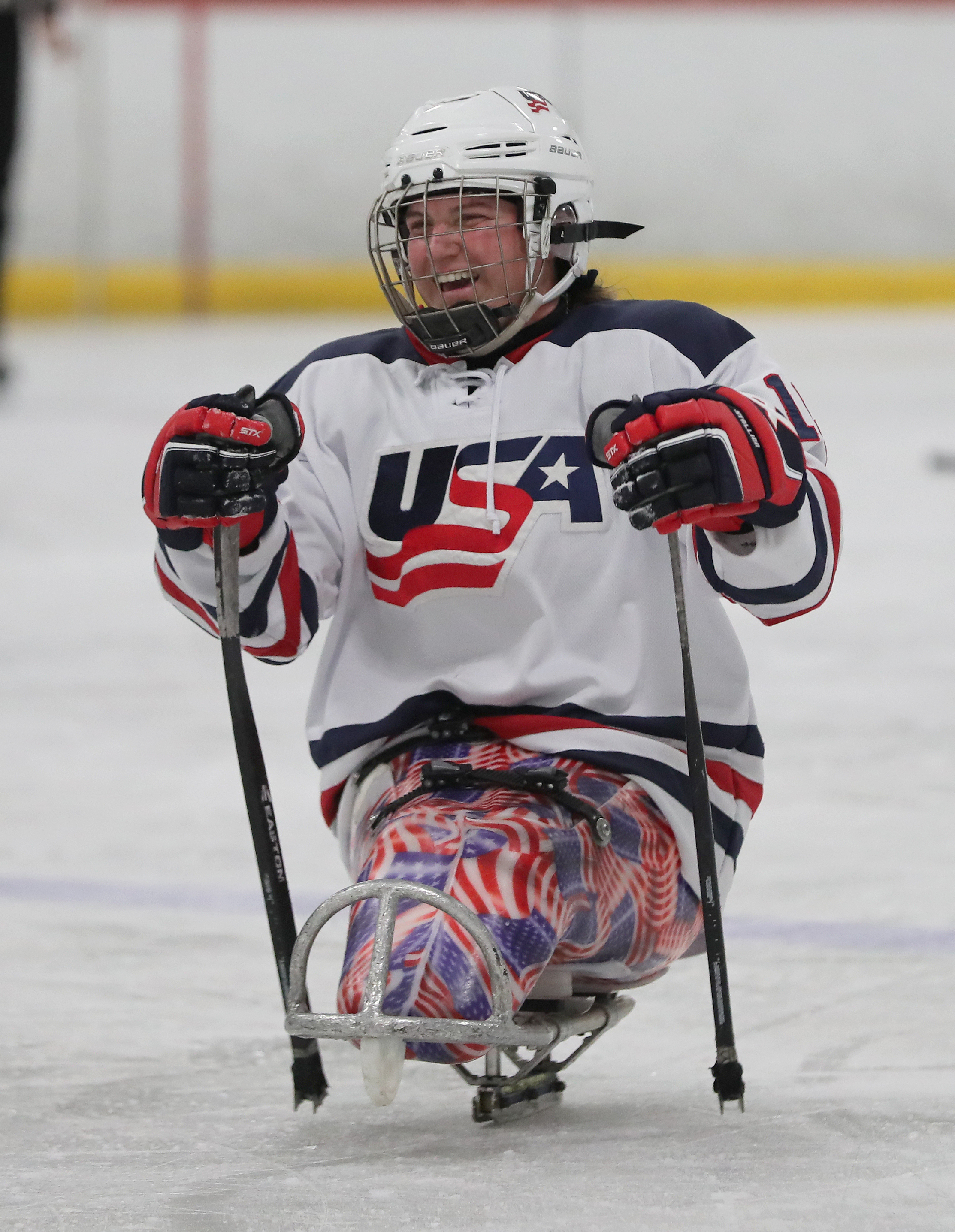
Christy Gardner playing sled hockey for Team USA in St. Louis, MO

Christy Gardner (born in Lewiston, Maine) is an athlete that participates in women's ice sledge hockey. A member of the United States women's national ice sledge hockey team, she competed in the first-ever IPC Ice Sledge Hockey Women's International Cup in 2014. Prior to competing with the national women's team, Gardner served in the United States Armed Forces.

== Military service ==
Serving as a Sergeant in the United States Army Military Police in Asia, Gardner had an injury in 2006.

She medically retired from the military in December 2007. By 2010, a fall down the stairs led Gardner to accept a service dog. Named Moxie, she is a golden retriever and accompanies Gardner to all athletic competitions that she participated in.

== Athletic career ==
A multi-sport star, Gardner participated in basketball, field hockey, soccer and track and field at Edward Little High School in Auburn, Maine. Gardner earned a scholarship to LIU Post for field hockey and track, though she dropped track to play lacrosse. After graduating with a degree in photography, she enlisted in the United States Army.

=== U.S. Women's National Sled Hockey Team ===
With the United States women's national ice sledge hockey team, Gardner participated in the first major Women's Ice Sledge Hockey International Jamboree, which was hosted on May 11, 2012, in Philadelphia, Pennsylvania, competing against teams from Canada and Europe. Gardner's ice sledge hockey club team is the USA Warriors. On a team with soldiers who received treatment from the Walter Reed National Military Medical Center, Gardner competed in the third annual USA Hockey Sled Classic, hosted by the National Hockey League in Buffalo, New York during Veterans Day weekend in 2012.

Competing at the IPC Ice Sledge Hockey Women's International Cup from November 7–9, 2014 in Brampton, Ontario, Canada, Gardner helped the United States to the gold medal. Playing against Canada in the final, Gardner and Nina Nissly earned the assist on the first goal of the game, scored by Erica Mitchell, as the US prevailed in the 5–1 final

=== US Paralympic Trials ===
Gardner participated in the US Paralympic Trials for the 2016 Rio Paralympics. Assigned a classification of F57, Gardner participated in the Women's Shot Put for F34/56/57 and the Women's Discus Throw for F56/57. Held at Johnson C. Smith University, Gardner finished in first place in both events. In the Women's Shot Put, she threw a distance of 7.90 meters, edging out Angela Madsen by .15 meters. In the Women's Discus, Gardner threw for 21.26 meters while Madsen finished in second place again, with a distance of 18.36 meters.

== Awards and honors ==
- 2013 USA Hockey Disabled Athlete of the Year

== Personal ==
In March 2014, she was recognized by American Hockey League's Portland Pirates during their "Local Hockey Heroes" celebration. Said celebration was also part of USA Hockey's Hockey Weekend Across America. Gardner was featured in the book "Sports Souls", photographing athletes with their pets, with proceeds benefiting animal charities.

She also serves in a coaching capacity in ice sledge hockey, working with the New England Warriors veterans' hockey program in Maine. Having attended the University of Southern Maine, she earned a degree in Therapeutic Recreation.
