= Kaden Herchenroether =

American sledge hockey player (born 2005)

Personal information
- Born: January 3, 2005 (age 21)
- Home town: Allison Park, Pennsylvania, U.S.

Sport
- Country: United States
- Sport: Ice sled hockey
- Disability: Spina bifida
Medal record
Para ice hockey
Representing the United States
World Championships
Gold medal – first place	2025 Dolný Kubín	Team competition

Kaden Herchenroether (born January 3, 2005) is an American ice sled hockey player and member of the United States national team.

== Early life and education ==
Herchenroether was born with spina bifida. She graduated from the University of Pittsburgh with a Bachelor's degree in sociology with certificates in criminal law and justice and creative writing. She now attends Duquesne University for graduate school.

== Career ==
Herchenroether made her first United States national team roster competing at the 2022 Women's World Challenge and won a gold medal. She again won gold medals at the 2023 and 2024 Women's World Challenge.

She represented the United States at the inaugural Women's World Para Ice Hockey Championships in 2025 where she ranked third on the team in scoring with three goals and four assists in four games and won a gold medal. On November 13, 2026, she was named to Team USA's roster for the 2026 Women's World Para Ice Hockey Championships.
