= Ashley Goure =

- Born: July 6, 1990 (age 36) Chatham, Ontario, Canada
- Position: Defence
- National team: Canada
- Playing career: 2006–present
Medal record
Representing Canada
Women's National ice sledge hockey
IPC Ice Sledge Hockey Women's International Cup
Silver medal – second place	2014 Canada	Tournament

Ashley Goure (born July 6, 1990) is an athlete that participates in women's ice sledge hockey. A member of the Canada women's national ice sledge hockey team since 2006, she competed in the first-ever IPC Ice Sledge Hockey Women's International Cup in 2014.

== Playing career ==
Born without tibia bones in her legs, her first exposure to ice sledge hockey came at a sporting demonstration in Sarnia back in 1998. Raised in Chatham, Ontario, the same area where Paralympic ice sledge hockey player Derek Whitson was raised, the two have also played together in numerous events.

In addition to playing with the national women's team, Goure also competes on a team featuring both women and men in the Windsor, Ontario area known as the Windsor-Essex Ice Bullets. Of note, Goure also participated in the first ever all female game of sledge hockey in Canada, which took place in Ottawa, Ontario during May 2007.

At the Women's Ice Sledge Hockey International Jamboree in Philadelphia, Goure had a strong performance. In her first game against Team Europe, Goure scored a hat trick for an 8–0 win. In the second game, Goure would score a goal in a loss to the United States. On the second day of competition, Goure played in two games, a 5–0 shutout over USA, and a 4–1 triumph over Team Europe. She would score a goal in both contests.

=== Canada Women's National Sled Hockey Team ===
Competing at the IPC Ice Sledge Hockey Women's International Cup from November 7–9, 2014 in Brampton, Ontario, Canada, Goure was one of Canada's scoring leaders in tournament play, as she accumulated 11 goals in six games played.

During Canada's inaugural game at the event, Goure scored the Canadian team's first ever goal at the event. A second period tally, it was assisted by Christina Picton and Corin Metzger. Competing against the United States in the final, Goure scored Canada's only goal in the 5–1 loss.
