= Lera Doederlein =

American sledge hockey player (born 2003)

Personal information
- Full name: Valeria Doederlein
- Born: April 15, 2003 (age 23) Saratov, Russia
- Home town: Escondido, California, U.S.

Sport
- Country: United States
- Sport: Ice sled hockey
- Disability: Arthrogryposis
Medal record
Para ice hockey
Representing the United States
World Championships
Gold medal – first place	2025 Dolný Kubín	Team competition

Valeria Doederlein (born April 15, 2003) is an American ice sled hockey player and member of the United States national team. She is a former Para cross-country skier and biathlete who represented the United States at the 2022 Winter Paralympics.

== Early life ==
Doederlein, was born in Saratov, Russia, with arthrogryposis, a condition that severely limits joint mobility in her lower extremities. She was placed in an orphanage by her birth parents. She was adopted by David and Hiromi Doederlein when she was 21 months old and moved to the United States. In 2017, at 14 years old, she decided to undergo a bilateral above-knee amputation to improve her quality of life. She was raised in Arizona, before her family moved to San Diego, California in 2018. She attends the North County Church of Christ.

== Career ==
Doederlein represented the United States at the 2022 Winter Paralympics in the biathlon and cross-country skiing and had two top-ten finishes.

She made her first United States national team roster competing at the 2022 Women's World Challenge and won a gold medal. She competed at the 2023 Women's World Challenge where she led all skaters in scoring with three goals and five assists and won a gold medal. She again won a gold medal at the 2024 Women's World Challenge.

She represented the United States at the inaugural Women's World Para Ice Hockey Championships in 2025 where she ranked second in scoring during the tournament with four goals and seven assists and won a gold medal. On November 13, 2026, she was named to Team USA's roster for the 2026 Women's World Para Ice Hockey Championships.
