= Geneva Coulter =

Canadian ice hockey player

- Born: January 1, 1999 (age 27) Edmonton, Alberta, Canada
- Position: Defense
- National team: Canada
- Playing career: 2010–present
Medal record
Representing Canada
Women's National Ice sledge hockey
IPC Ice Sledge Hockey Women's International Cup
Silver medal – second place	2014 Canada	Tournament

Geneva Coulter (born January 1, 1999) is a Canadian athlete that participates in women's ice sledge hockey. A member of the Canada women's national ice sledge hockey team, she competed in the first-ever IPC Ice Sledge Hockey Women's International Cup in 2014.

== Playing career ==
Afflicted with Legg-Perthes Disease, Coulter competes at the defense position. When not with the national team, she is a member of the Edmonton Impact, having played alongside fellow national team members such as Alanna Mah and Eri Yamamoto MacDonald.

=== Canada Women's National Sled Hockey Team ===
Competing at the IPC Ice Sledge Hockey Women's International Cup from November 7–9, 2014 in Brampton, Ontario, Canada, it marked Coulter's international debut.
