= Danica McPhee =

Canadian ice sledge hockey player

- Born: December 9, 1989 (age 36) Sudbury, Ontario, Canada
- Position: Forward
- OSHA team: Mississauga Cruisers
- National team: Canada
- Playing career: 2013–present
Medal record
Representing Canada
Women's National ice sledge hockey
IPC Ice Sledge Hockey Women's International Cup
Silver medal – second place	2014 Canada	Tournament

Danica McPhee (born December 9, 1989) is an athlete participating in women's ice sledge hockey. A member of the Canada women's national ice sledge hockey team since 2014, she competed in the first-ever IPC Ice Sledge Hockey Women's International Cup in 2014.

== Playing career ==
Having damaged her L1 vertebrae after an accident in Cancun, Mexico on February 19, 2013, part of McPhee's recovery included participation in sport. Although she currently resides in Mississauga, Ontario, McPhee returned to her hometown of Sudbury, Ontario to participate in an exhibition game with the Mississauga Red Dogs.

=== Canada Women's National Sled Hockey Team ===
Competing at the IPC Ice Sledge Hockey Women's International Cup from November 7–9, 2014 in Brampton, Ontario, Canada, she scored her first international goal in Canada's second game of the event, a 6–1 victory against Team Europe. Said goal was assisted by Tuyet Morris Yurczyszyn and Corin Metzger.

== Career stats ==
=== Canadian women's national sled hockey team ===
Event	Games	Goals	Assists	Points	PIM
2014 IPC Women’s Worlds	6	1	4	5	2
