= Derek Whitson =

Canadian ice sledge hockey player

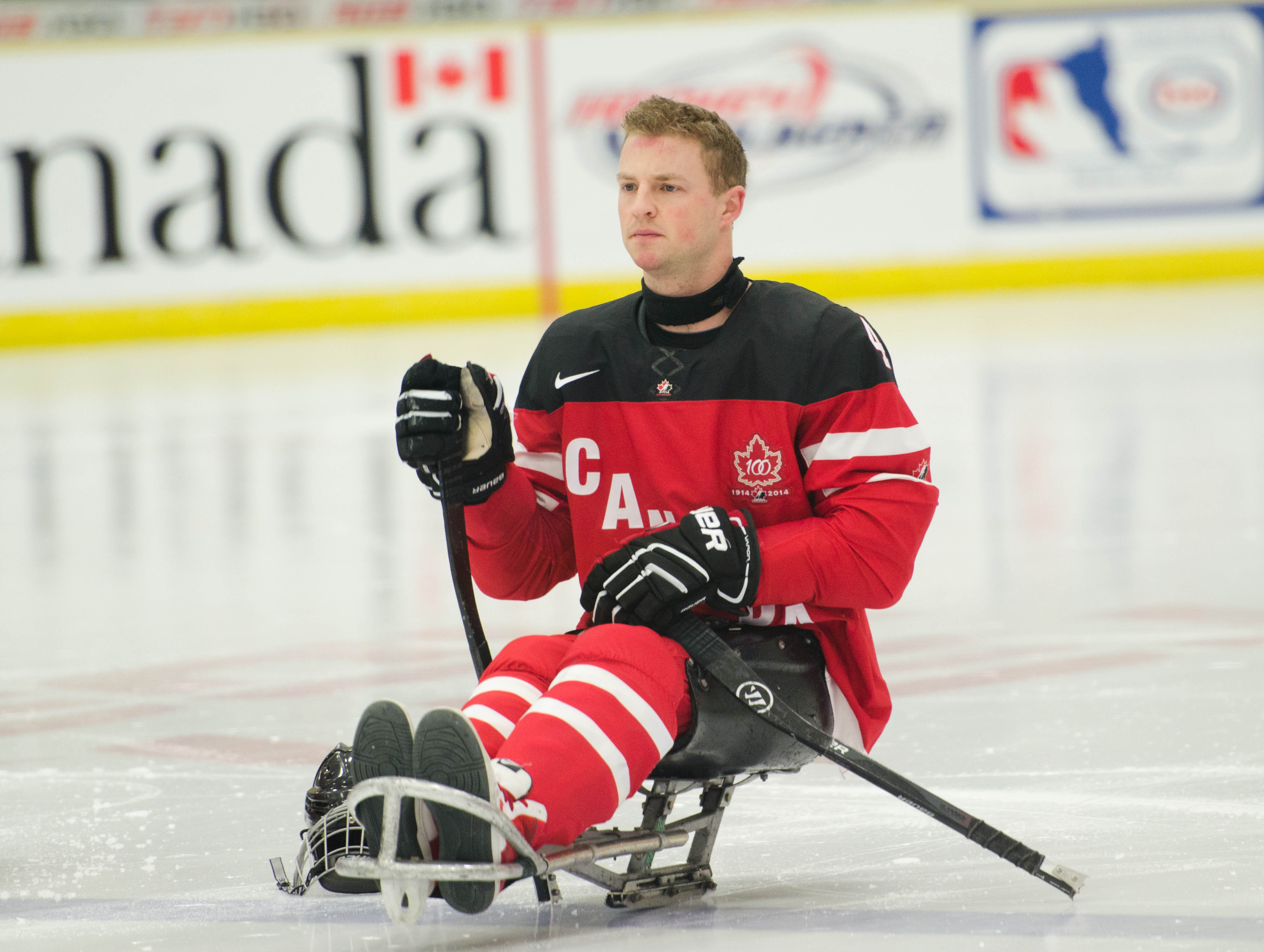
- Whitson in 2015

Personal information
- Born: 21 June 1989 (age 37) Chatham, Ontario, Canada
- Years active: 2007–present
- Height: 6 ft 1 in (1.85 m)
- Weight: 165 lb (75 kg)

Sport
- Country: Canada
- Sport: Ice sledge hockey
- Position: Defence
Medal record
Representing Canada
Para ice hockey
Paralympic Games
Bronze medal – third place	2014 Sochi	Team competition
World Championships
Gold medal – first place	2013 Goyang	Team competition
Silver medal – second place	2015 Buffalo	Team competition
Football 7-a-side
Parapan American Games
Bronze medal – third place	2007 Rio de Janeiro	Team competition

Derek Whitson (born 21 June 1989) is a Canadian ice sledge hockey player.

Whitson was born in Chatham, Ontario in 1989, with cerebral palsy. He joined the Canadian Sledge Hockey Team in 2007 after playing sledge hockey in the Windsor Ice Bullets sledge hockey program. He was a member of the Canadian sledge hockey team that won the silver medal at the 2009 World Sledge Hockey Challenge, as well as the one that competed in the 2010 Winter Paralympics. He was also a member of team who won the gold medal in the 2013 IPC Sledge Hockey World Championships in Korea. Whitson also is a player of football 7-a-side, in which he won a bronze medal at the 2007 Pan-American Games in Rio de Janeiro. He is also an avid golfer and artist, in which he has donated pieces of his art to art auctions in support of Canadian athletes.

== Personal life ==
Whitson moved to Medicine Hat, Alberta in 2014 where he then became engaged to Tara Chisholm who is the current coach of the Canada women's national ice sledge hockey team.
