= Nina Nissly =

Russian-born American ice sledge hockey player

- Born: January 25, 1995 (age 31) Skupina, Russia
- Position: Forward
- National team: United States
- Playing career: 2012–present
Medal record
Representing United States
Women's ice hockey
IPC Ice Sledge Hockey Women's International Cup
Gold medal – first place	2014 Canada	Tournament

Nina Nissly (born January 25, 1995) is a women's ice sledge hockey player that compete for the United States women's national ice sledge hockey team. Born in Skupina, Russia, she was diagnosed with cerebral palsy in her infancy. Of note, she was a member of the US roster that competed at the inaugural IPC Ice Sledge Hockey International Women's Cup, capturing the gold medal.

== Playing career ==
Her first experience with the sport was in the Great Lakes Adaptive Sports Association. As a 15-year-old attending Lake Forest High School, she would qualify for the US women's ice sledge hockey team in 2012. At the inaugural IPC Ice Sledge Hockey International Women's Cup in 2014, she finished the event with three points. In Game 3, she would log two assists on goals scored by Kelsey DiClaudio. A Game 6 win against Team Europe saw Nissly register a goal.

== Other ==
Nissly competed in the National Junior Disability Championships for Swimming. In 2010, she was selected as one of 13 American student-athletes with a physical disability granted the chance to attend the Paralympic Experience in Vancouver. Currently, she is a student at the University of Wisconsin-Whitewater.
