= Akari Fukunishi =

Japanese ice sledge hockey player

Personal information
- Born: 23 November 1990 (age 35) Takatsuki, Japan

Sport
- Sport: Ice sledge hockey
- Position: Defenceman

Akari Fukunishi (born 23 November 1990) is a Japanese ice sledge hockey player. She was the only woman to compete at the 2026 Winter Olympics in para ice hockey.

== Biography ==
In March 2021, while riding her motorcycle, Akari was struck by a car, leading to a critical injury. She regained mobility but lost the ability to run or jump.

At the 2025 Women's World Para Ice Hockey Championship in Slovakia, the inaugural edition of the tournament, Akari played for Team World. Team World was composed of players who do not have their own national team.

Akari was the only woman to compete at the 2026 Winter Olympics in para ice hockey. She the fourth woman to take part in para ice hockey in the history of the Paralympics.
