= Jessie Gregory =

- Born: August 24, 1984 (age 42) Brantford, Ontario, Canada
- Position: Goaltender
- Catches: Left
- OSHA team: Niagara Thunderblades
- National team: Canada
- Playing career: 2011–present
- Website: http://jessiegregory84.wix.com/jessiegregory
Medal record
Representing Canada
Women's National Ice sledge hockey
IPC Ice Sledge Hockey Women's International Cup
Silver medal – second place	2014 Canada	Tournament

Jessie Gregory (born August 24, 1984) is a Canadian ice sledge hockey player. A member of the Canada women's national ice sledge hockey team since 2011, she competed in the first-ever IPC Ice Sledge Hockey Women's International Cup in 2014.

== Playing career ==
Having sustained a spinal cord injury after being hit by a car in 2008, Gregory also endured permanent nerve damage to her legs. Gregory began playing ice sledge hockey in 2011. When she is not competing with the national team, Gregory's club team is the Brant County Crushers, who compete in the Ontario Sledge Hockey Association. Having also played with Gregory on the national team, Tuyet Morris Yurczyszyn is one of her teammates on the Crushers.

=== Canada Women's National Sled Hockey Team ===
Gregory made her debut for the national team in 2012, at a Women's Sledge Hockey Tournament which was held in Voorhees, New Jersey. Competing at the IPC Ice Sledge Hockey Women's International Cup from November 7–9, 2014 in Brampton, Ontario, Canada, Gregory was one of two goaltenders on the Canadian roster, sharing duties with Shawnie Snell.

== Personal ==
Gregory served as one of the Brantford, Ontario community torch bearers on June 19, 2015, during the torch relay for the 2015 Pan American Games.
