= Kelsey DiClaudio =

American ice sledge hockey player (born 1997)

- Born: July 22, 1997 (age 29) Pittsburgh, PA, USA
- Height: 4 ft 11 in (150 cm)
- Weight: 97 lb (44 kg; 6 st 13 lb)
- Position: Forward
- National team: United States
- Playing career: 2007–present
Medal record
Women's ice sledge hockey
Representing United States
Women's International Cup
Gold medal – first place	2014 Brampton	Tournament

Kelsey DiClaudio (born July 22, 1997) is an American athlete who participates in women's ice sledge hockey. A member of the United States women's national ice sledge hockey team, she competed in the first-ever IPC Ice Sledge Hockey Women's International Cup in 2014. Prior to competing with the national women's team, DiClaudio competed with men on the Pittsburgh Mighty Penguins.

== Early life ==
DiClaudio was born on July 22, 1997, with tethered spinal cord syndrome. She had five tethered cord release surgeries to relieve pain in her back.

DiClaudio began playing ice sledge hockey aged 8.

== Playing career ==
During October 2010, DiClaudio and the Pittsburgh Penguins men's ice sledge hockey team participated in the semi-finals of the first annual USA Hockey Sled Classic in 2010.

DiClaudio was in attendance at the Women's Sports Foundation's 35th Annual Salute to Women In Sports awards. The event took place in New York City on October 15, 2014.

During the 2024 Sled Classic, DiClaudio seven goals and nine assists.

=== U.S. Women's National Sled Hockey Team ===
Competing at the IPC Ice Sledge Hockey Women's International Cup from November 7–9, 2014 in Brampton, Ontario, Canada, DiClaudio helped the United States to the gold medal. Playing against Canada in the final, DiClaudio contributed with four goals and one assist in the 5–1 victory DiClaudio would contribute 23 points (16 goals, 7 assists) at the event.

=== U.S. Men's National Development Sled Hockey Teams ===
DiCladio was the first woman named to the U.S. Men's National Development Sled Hockey Team in July 2014. She netted her first goal in international play on March 11, 2015, as part of a 3–0 shutout against Team Canada in Calgary, AB, CAN.

On July 17, 2015, DiClaudio was named to the 2015–16 U.S. Men's National Development Sled Hockey Team for the second consecutive season.

=== Women's World events ===
At the 2023 Women’s World Challenge, DiClaudio scored during the 2-0 victory over Canada and took home the gold medal.

At the 2025 Women's World Para Ice Hockey Championship in Slovakia, the inaugural edition of the tournament, DiClaudio scored the first goal of the tournament, was named the tournament's Best Forward and MVP and won the gold medal with the American team. In the final against Canada, she scored four goals, leading all scorers with 11 goals and 15 points in four games.

=== Paralympics campaign ===
DiCladio has campaigned for women’s sled hockey to be a part of 2030 Winter Paralympics in France. Para hockey is officially a mixed gender sport, but only one woman was on any of the team rosters at the 2026 Winter Paralympics in Italy.

== Personal life ==
DiCladio came out as bisexual during college.

== Awards and honors ==
- Leading Scorer, 2014 IPC Ice Sledge Hockey Women's International Cup
- Allianz Athlete of the Month (November 2014)
- Nominee for the Laureus World Sports Awards Disabled Athlete of the Year (2026)
