= Tara Chisholm =

Canadian sledge hockey coach

Tara Chisholm is the head coach of Canada women's national ice sledge hockey team. Hailing from Medicine Hat, Alberta, she has served as Canada’s head coach since 2014.

== Career ==
Prior to coaching in women's ice sledge hockey, Chisholm attended Medicine Hat College from 2006–08 and played on the soccer team. She then attended the University of Alberta from 2008-2010 where she mentored under U of A Panda's Head Coach, Howie Draper.

=== Coaching ===
During her first year as Canada’s head coach, she led the squad to the silver medal at the inaugural 2014 IPC Ice Sledge Hockey Women's International Cup in Brampton, Ontario.

== Coaching record ==
Year	Team	Event	W	L	T	Result
2014	Canada	IPC International Women’s Cup	2	2	0	Silver
2015	Canada	Exhibition vs. US (Buffalo, NY)	1	2	0	
2015	Canada	Exhibition vs. US (Brampton, ON)	2	1	0	

== Other ==
Started non-profit organization called Medicine Hat Adaptive Sport and Recreation
