= USA Warriors =

The USA Warriors Ice Hockey Program, Inc. is an ice hockey program providing hockey opportunities for veterans injured during their military service. The USA Warriors Ice Hockey Program was established in 2008 as a 501(c)(3) nonprofit organization. The program promotes teamwork and camaraderie and provides athletic opportunities for wounded soldiers as continuing rehabilitation to their visible and invisible disabilities. The USA Warriors Ice Hockey Program offers wounded and disabled veterans the opportunity to recover and heal through the sport of ice hockey. The Warriors offer both standing and Sled hockey teams dependent on the participant’s physical capabilities and the program is open to all wounded or disabled veterans, regardless of whether they have played hockey before. The program’s motto is “None Tougher - Hockey Heals.”

Both standing and sled teams designated Rockville, Maryland Ice Arena as their home ice facility practice, and practice at various rinks in the Washington D.C., Maryland and Northern Virginia region.

The USA Warriors Ice Hockey Program is staffed entirely by volunteers and receives support from numerous organizations, including the NHL, USA Hockey, and the Washington Capitals. Annually the team plays a fundraiser match against the team founded by the US Congress. In 2012, this game was attended by the Chief of Staff of the U.S. Army.

== Affiliate Programs ==
The USA Warriors support several affiliate ice hockey programs for disabled veterans throughout the country, while based out of the area surrounding Washington, D.C.. As of 2025, the current affiliate programs include:

- Georgia Warriors
- Chattahoochi Valley Warriors
- New England Warriors
- Ohio Warriors
- Delmarva Warriors

== Events and Notable Members ==
September 2026, the team sponsored its Second Annual charity golf tournament which partnered with Miracle 4 Melanie and the Disabled American Veterans foundations to raise awareness and funding for veteran hockey. The event directly had support from former Washington Capital and current studio host for Monumental Sports Network, Alan May.

In May 2026, the seventh annual sled hockey tournament was supported by Master Sergeant Caleb Green, known for signing the National Anthem for the Washington Capital’s home games. Additional event support again came from Alan May, who promoted the event with the sled team captain on ABC and NBC morning news.

In October 2024, the Washington Capitals announced the formation of the Washington Capitals Warriors Hockey Team, a collaboration between the NHL's Washington Capitals, the USA Warriors and the Capital Beltway Warriors. Players from the Washington Capitals Warriors participated in the Capitals alumni game in October 2024 in Arlington, VA. During the first year of existence, the Washington Capitals Warriors won the national championship for Warrior Hockey in Miami, Florida.

In October 2024, the Washington Capitals announced the formation of the Washington Capitals Warriors Hockey Team, a collaboration between the NHL's Washington Capitals, the USA Warriors and the Capital Beltway Warriors. Players from the Washington Capitals Warriors participated in the Capitals alumni game in October 2024 in Arlington, VA. The Capitals also hosted a standing hockey tournament featuring two USA Warriors teams and six other Warriors teams in September, 2023, in partnership with the Laborers' International Union of North America (LIUNA).

LIUNA has also sponsored previous USA Warriors tournaments, including a 2019 tournament featuring twelve teams from around the nation. The 2019 tournament included a dinner for tournament players and their families that featured a keynote address on post-traumatic stress disorder (PTSD) and suicide prevention by former NHL goaltender Clint Malarchuk and his wife Joanie. Malarchuk’s story of triumph over tragedy is documented in his autobiography "A Matter of Inches: How I Survived the Crease and Beyond" which recounts his near-fatal on-ice accident and his subsequent struggles with PTSD en route to becoming an internationally known speaker on PTSD and suicide prevention.

In May 2024, at their home rink in Rockville, MD, the USA Warriors sled team hosted, for the fifth time, a sled hockey tournament for disabled military veterans, featuring six sled hockey teams from around the country. As far as the USA Warriors can determine, this is the only sled hockey tournament of its kind. Participants have included gold-medal winning Paralympians Ralph DeQuebec and Rico Roman of the US National team. Chairman of the Joint Chiefs of Staff General Mark Milley, himself a former collegiate hockey player, was on hand to congratulate the participating Warriors teams and perform a ceremonial puck-drop for the championship game. The tournament ended with a 2-0 victory by the USA Warriors over the Ohio Warriors.

In March of 2024, the USA Warriors announced that long-time USA Warriors standing team member Mark Stossel was inducted to the Carolina's Boxing Hall of Fame for his contributions to the sport of Boxing in North and South Carolina. That same month, members of the USA Warriors participated in the Hockey for Heroes fundraising exhibition organized by Navy Youth Hockey. Hockey for Heroes raises money and awareness for veterans’ organizations such as the Wounded Warrior Project and Disabled American Veterans.

Paralympian Christy Gardner, a gold medalist with the USA Women’s IPC sledge team in 2014, competes as a member of the USA Warriors affiliate organization New England Warriors sled team. Gardner was featured in a 2023 interview with Sports Illustrated that discussed her efforts to co-found the New England Warriors.

During the response to the COVID-19 pandemic, the USA Warriors leadership held weekly check-in video calls among players, coaches and volunteers. The calls featured appearances by former NHL players, including Hockey Hall of Fame player and current NHL coach Martin St. Louis, former NHL goaltender and current NHL Network correspondent Kevin Weekes, Clint Malarchuk, and "Killer" Kevin Kaminski. General Mark Milley also shared his thoughts on what hockey means to him and in the context of team building and camaraderie.

In March of 2019, the USA Warriors standing team was selected as one of four teams of United States veterans to participate as a member of Navy Federal Credit Union's first annual "Veterans Showcase” ice hockey event in Denver and Colorado Springs, Colorado. This event, in conjunction with the NHL Stadium Series game played at the United States Air Force Academy football stadium, provided opportunities to showcase the team and program success. This partnership provided significant exposure for the USA Warrior Ice Hockey Program to the broader ice hockey, military and civilian communities.

In 2019 after having played in the annual Armed Services Hockey Association national tournaments, which are held in Las Vegas each year, over Veteran’s Day weekend, the USA Warriors fielded two teams in different skill brackets. Both USA Warriors teams ended up winning the tournament championship for their bracket.

In March 2015, the USA Warriors traveled to Chicago to take part in a series of events in support of the Clint Reif Memorial Fund. In January 2015 and in January 2018, the USA Warriors took part in events surrounding the NHL Winter Classic in Washington D.C. and Annapolis, Maryland. As a prelude to the NHL game at the United States Naval Academy stadium, in which the Washington Capitals defeated the Toronto Maple Leafs, the USA Warriors sled hockey team defeated the Soldier On team of disabled veterans from Canada.

== Positive Impact ==
"None Tougher / Hockey Heals” is the USA Warriors mantra, and the program emphasizes core characteristics of passion, desire, determination and fellowship. The USA Warriors Hockey team is brotherhood of wounded and disabled veterans and volunteers, collectively engaged in helping one another heal through hockey.

The USA Warriors and similar hockey programs for disabled veterans throughout the country have had a positive effect on the suicide rate of veterans. As of 2020, the suicide rate for veterans was 57% higher than the adjusted rates for non-veteran adults in the U.S. It is believed that the suicide rate among disabled veterans playing in programs offering them standing or sled hockey is considerably lower.

Members of the USA Warriors affiliate Ohio Warriors attested to the camaraderie, community and mental health benefits that participation in the Warriors Hockey program can provide in a 2024 interview. Ohio Warriors co-founder Vince Moncrief noted that hockey can be a form of therapy for veterans.

== USA Warriors Ice Hockey Program v. USA Hockey, Inc. (Trademark Dispute) ==
In a precedential decision, the Trademark Trial and Appeal Board (TTAB) upheld a refusal to register the mark of the USA Warriors Ice Hockey Program for services involving ice hockey programs for injured and disabled military personnel. The refusal was based on Section 2(d) of the Lanham Act, citing a likelihood of confusion with an existing mark owned by USA Hockey, Inc.

USA Warriors argued that it held an existing registration for a similar mark and that the two had coexisted without issue. It further contended that USA Hockey’s display of its mark on their website implied consent. The TTAB rejected these arguments, distinguishing the case from the earlier Strategic Partners decision, where coexistence of over five years had been critical. In contrast, USA Warriors’ mark had only been registered for 3½ years, leaving it vulnerable to cancellation based on likelihood of confusion.

The Board also found that no formal consent agreement existed between the parties, emphasizing that mere use of a mark on another party’s website does not constitute legal consent for trademark registration.

This decision reinforces the importance of obtaining a formal consent agreement when seeking to register a potentially conflicting mark, even in cases of apparent coexistence or informal collaboration.
