= Women's World Para Ice Hockey Championships =

International para ice hockey tournament

- Sport: Para ice hockey
- Founded: 2025
- Country: IPC members
- Continent: IPC (International)
- Most recent champion: United States (1st title)
- Most titles: United States (1 title)

The Women's World Para Ice Hockey Championships, are the world championships for women's sledge hockey. They are organized by the International Paralympic Committee through its World Para Ice Hockey subcommittee.

== History ==
Prior to the creation of the Women's World Para Ice Hockey Championships, the Women's World Challenge was created in 2022 to expand female participation in Para ice hockey worldwide. This tournament acted as a precursor to the Women's World Para Ice Hockey World Championships. The first Women's World Para Ice Hockey Championships were held in Dolný Kubín, Slovakia in 2025 at Dolný Kubín Winter Stadium. The United States defeated Canada in the inaugural tournament in 2025. The 2026 championships are being held in the Australian city of Newcastle at Hunter Ice Skating Stadium.

== Results ==
| Year | Host | Gold medal game | | | Bronze medal game | | |
| Year | Host | Gold | Score | Silver | Bronze | Score | Fourth place |
|---|---|---|---|---|---|---|---|
| 2025 | (Slovakia); Dolný Kubín | United States | 7–1 | Canada | Norway | 6–0 | Great Britain |
| 2026 | (Australia); Newcastle | – | – | – | – | – | – |

=== Medal table ===
| Rank | Nation | Gold | Silver | Bronze | Total |
|---|---|---|---|---|---|
| 1 | United States (USA) | 1 | 0 | 0 | 1 |
| 2 | Canada (CAN) | 0 | 1 | 0 | 1 |
| 3 | Norway (NOR) | 0 | 0 | 1 | 1 |
| Totals (3 entries) | | 1 | 1 | 1 | 3 |

=== Participating nations ===
| Team | (Slovakia) 2025 | Total |
|---|---|---|
| Australia | 6th | 1 |
| Canada | 2nd | 1 |
| Great Britain | 4th | 1 |
| Norway | 3rd | 1 |
| United States | 1st | 1 |
| Team World | 5th | 1 |

== See also ==
- World Para Ice Hockey Championships
