= Peggy Assinck =

Canadian ice sledge hockey player

- Born: May 8, 1983 (age 43) Peterborough, ON, Canada
- Position: Forward
- National team: Canada
- Playing career: 2008–present
Medal record
Representing Canada
Women's National Ice sledge hockey
IPC Ice Sledge Hockey Women's International Cup
Silver medal – second place	2014 Canada	Tournament

Peggy Assinck (born May 8, 1983) is a Canadian ice sledge hockey athlete and neuroscientist. She competed in the inaugural IPC Ice Sledge Hockey Women's International Cup in 2014.

== Early life and education ==
Assinck was born with spina bifida and became paralyzed at the age of 11, following a non-traumatic spinal injury. Prior to this, she was involved in various sports.

Assinck completed her PhD in neuroscience at the University of British Columbia in 2017. Her doctoral research was conducted at the International Collaboration on Repair Discoveries (ICORD) spinal cord injury Research Centre.

== Research areas and interests ==
Assinck's main interest is in spinal cord injuries (SCI), with a focus on how the central nervous system functions and the biological changes that may occur after a spinal cord injury. Her two areas of focus are to determine how the host cells contribute to repair after the injury, and the use of cell transplantation as a potential therapy for spinal cord injury.

Her passion for this area of research stemmed from her time spent in the hospital during her first diagnosis.

== Sledge hockey ==
=== Canada women's national sledge hockey team ===
Assinck has played sledge hockey for 19 years, her first experience with the sport came during her recreational therapy following her injury. Her passion for sledge hockey progressed over time, and she has been on the Canadian Women's National Sledge Hockey Team for 11 years.

Assinck joined the Canada women's national ice sledge hockey team in 2007, and has been an advocate for this sport ever since. She competed at the IPC Ice Sledge Hockey Women's International Cup from November 7–9, 2014 in Brampton, Ontario, Canada, Assinck was part of the Canadian squad that earned a silver medal.

Assinik travelled to Sochi Russia to compete in the 2014 Winter Paralympic games. During this time, she accompanied a team of researchers from ICORD to the games to research autonomic functions in Paralympic athletes who have spinal cord injuries.

=== SportAbility sledge hockey program ===
Assinck won a City of Vancouver Accessible City Award for her involvement in the Learn to Play Sledge Hockey Program.

Assinck's role as Learn: Play Coordinator for sledge hockey at SportAbility combines her passion for the sport with her research in spinal cord injury rehabilitation to help youth get involved in accessible sport. Her work aims to encourage individuals both with and without disability to play sledge hockey to increase the reach of adaptable sports.

Within this position, Assinck has been involved in the development of sledge hockey programs around Quebec, Ontario, and British Columbia.

=== Community Involvement ===
Within the community, Peggy helps facilitate local sledge hockey team development to help expose people with a wide range of abilities to this sport. Stemming from her childhood involvement in a variety of sports, Assinck quickly took up the sport of sledge hockey during her recovery. She then began advocating for more individuals to get involved in sledge hockey for rehabilitative purposes.

== Honours, decorations, awards and distinctions ==
2016 Vancouver Coastal Health Research Institute Top Graduating Doctoral Student Award

2016 City of Vancouver Accessible City Award, individual category

2015 Vancouver Coastal Health Research Institute Rising Star Award

2014 Rick Hansen Difference Maker Award: On Sunday, September 14, 2014, Sophie, Countess of Wessex visited the Blusson Spinal Cord Centre. During the visit, Assinck was among two recipients of the Difference Maker awards, presented by Rick Hansen.

== Selected publications ==
- Assinck, Peggy Lee (2017). Myelinating Cells in Repair of Spinal Cord Injury (PhD). University of British Columbia. doi:10.14288/1.0354576.
- Assinck, Peggy; Duncan, Greg J.; Hilton, Brett J.; Plemel, Jason R.; Tetzlaff, Wolfram (2017). "Cell transplantation therapy for spinal cord injury". Nature Neuroscience. 20 (5): 637–647. doi:10.1038/nn.4541. PMID 28440805. S2CID 6721104.
