= Claire Buchanan =

Canadian ice sledge hockey player

- Born: September 13, 1987 (age 39) Brampton, Ontario, Canada
- Position: Defense
- OSHA team: Mississauga Cruisers
- National team: Canada
- Playing career: 2007–present
Medal record
Representing Canada
Women's National Ice sledge hockey
IPC Ice Sledge Hockey Women's International Cup
Silver medal – second place	2014 Canada	Tournament

Claire Buchanan (born September 13, 1987) is an athlete that participates in women's ice sledge hockey. A member of the Canada women's national ice sledge hockey team, she competed in the first-ever IPC Ice Sledge Hockey Women's International Cup in 2014.

== Playing career ==
Born with spina bifida, Buchanan plays on the defense position in ice sledge hockey. When not with the national team, she is a member of the Mississauga Cruisers.

=== Canada Women's National Sledge Hockey Team ===
Competing at the IPC Ice Sledge Hockey Women's International Cup from November 7–9, 2014 in Brampton, Ontario, Canada.

=== Wheelchair basketball ===
Buchanan attended the University of Alabama, where she played on the women's wheelchair basketball team, winning a pair of championships, including in 2008–09, when the program won 30 games.

As a member of the Canadian national women's wheelchair basketball team, she was part of a fourth-place finish at the Osaka Cup in Osaka, Japan.
