= Christina Picton =

Canadian Para cross-country skier, biathlete, and former ice hockey player (born 1993)

Personal information
- Born: April 6, 1993 (age 33) St. Catherines, Ontario, Canada
- Home town: Fonthill, Ontario, Canada

Sport
- Country: Canada
- Sport: Para ice hockey, cross-country skiing, and biathlon
- Disability class: LW12 (skiing)
- Club: Kivi Nordic
- Coached by: Brian McKeever
Medal record
Women's Para ice hockey
Representing Canada
Women's International Cup
Silver medal – second place	2014 Canada	Tournament

Christina Picton (born April 6, 1993) is a Canadian Para cross-country skier, biathlete, and former ice hockey player. A member of the Canada women's national ice sledge hockey team since 2006. Picton served as the captain of the national team during the 2014–15 season.

She started her Nordic ski and Biathlon career in 2018, which took her to the 2022 Paralympic Games.

== Career ==
Having lost part of her right leg due to amputation, Picton began playing ice sledge hockey at the age of 11.

=== Canada Women's National Sledge Hockey Team ===
One of the charter members on the national team, Picton competed at the IPC Ice Sledge Hockey Women's International Cup from November 7–9, 2014 in Brampton, Ontario, Canada. During Canada's inaugural game at the event, Picton earned one of the assists on the first goal ever scored by the Canadian team, a second period tally which was scored by Ashley Goure. Picton finished the tournament with one goal and three assists, scoring her first goal in Game 4, a 6–3 victory against Team Europe.

=== Nordic Sit-Ski and Biathlete ===
Picton started Nordic skiing in 2018. She competes in cross country sit-ski and in the biathlon event. Picton competed in the 2022 Paralympic Games in Beijing, China.

== See also ==
- Canada at the 2022 Winter Paralympics
- Canada at the 2026 Winter Paralympics
