= Myriam Adam =

Canadian paracyclist and ice sledge hockey player

Medal record

Paralympic athletics

Representing Canada

Parapan American Games
| Gold medal – first place | 2011 Guadalajara | Road race H1M/H1-2W |

Myriam Adam (born July 11, 1993) is a former paracyclist from Canada that competed mainly in category H1-2W events. She is from Saint-Jean-sur-Richelieu, Quebec.

== Athletics ==
In April 2010, she participated at the 2010 UCI Para-Cycling Road World Championships, obtaining two silver medals. At the 2011 Parapan Am Games in Guadalajara, Mexico, Myriam captured the gold medal in the hand cycle division.

== Ice sledge hockey ==
For the 2015–16 season, Myriam was named to the roster of the Canada women's national ice sledge hockey team.

Of note, Myriam was part of the Quebec provincial women's ice sledge hockey team that competed at the Challenge Hivernal Adaptavie in February 2015.
