= Women's World Challenge =

- Current season, competition or edition: 2024 Women's World Challenge
- Sport: Para Ice Hockey
- Founded: 2022
- No. of teams: 5
- Continent: Para Ice Hockey
- Most recent champion: United States (3rd title)
- Most titles: United States (3 titles)

The Women's World Challenge is a Para Ice Hockey tournament for women teams. The competition was made with the ultimate goal of expanding female participation in Para ice hockey worldwide. This tournament also acted as a precursor to an eventual Women's World Para Ice Hockey Championships.

== History ==
Prior to the event, only three women had been to the Para ice hockey event at the Paralympics, so to increase opportunities for women in the sport, a women's-only tournament was created. The first Women's World Challenge was held in 2022, in the American city, Green Bay. The USA would win the first event, beating Canada 5–1 in the Gold Medal match. In 2023, also held in Green Bay, United States successfully defended their title, beating the Canadians 2–0 in the Final. In 2024, United States won a third title after topping the group in Skien, Norway.

== Summary ==
Year	Host	Winners	Runners-up	Third	Fourth
2022	(United States); Green Bay	United States	Canada	Team World	(United Kingdom); Great Britain
2023	(United States); Green Bay	United States	Canada	Team World	(United Kingdom); Great Britain
2024	(Norway); Skien	United States	Canada	Team Europe	(United Kingdom); Great Britain
