= Erica McKee =

American sledge hockey player

- Born: July 15, 1987 (age 39) Chicago, Illinois, U.S.
- Position: Defense
- National team: United States
- Playing career: 2007–present
Medal record
Representing United States
Women's ice hockey
IPC Ice Sledge Hockey Women's International Cup
Gold medal – first place	2014 Canada	Tournament

Erica McKee (née Mitchell; born July 15, 1987) is a women's ice sledge hockey player that compete for the United States women's national ice sledge hockey team.

== Career ==
Of note, she was named the captain for the US at the inaugural IPC Ice Sledge Hockey International Women's Cup, which saw the team capture the gold medal. Back in 2007, she had tried out for the United States national men's ice sledge hockey team.

== Awards and honors ==
- USA Hockey Disabled Athlete of the Year in 2007
