= Rebecca Mann =

American swimmer (born 1997)

Becca Mann
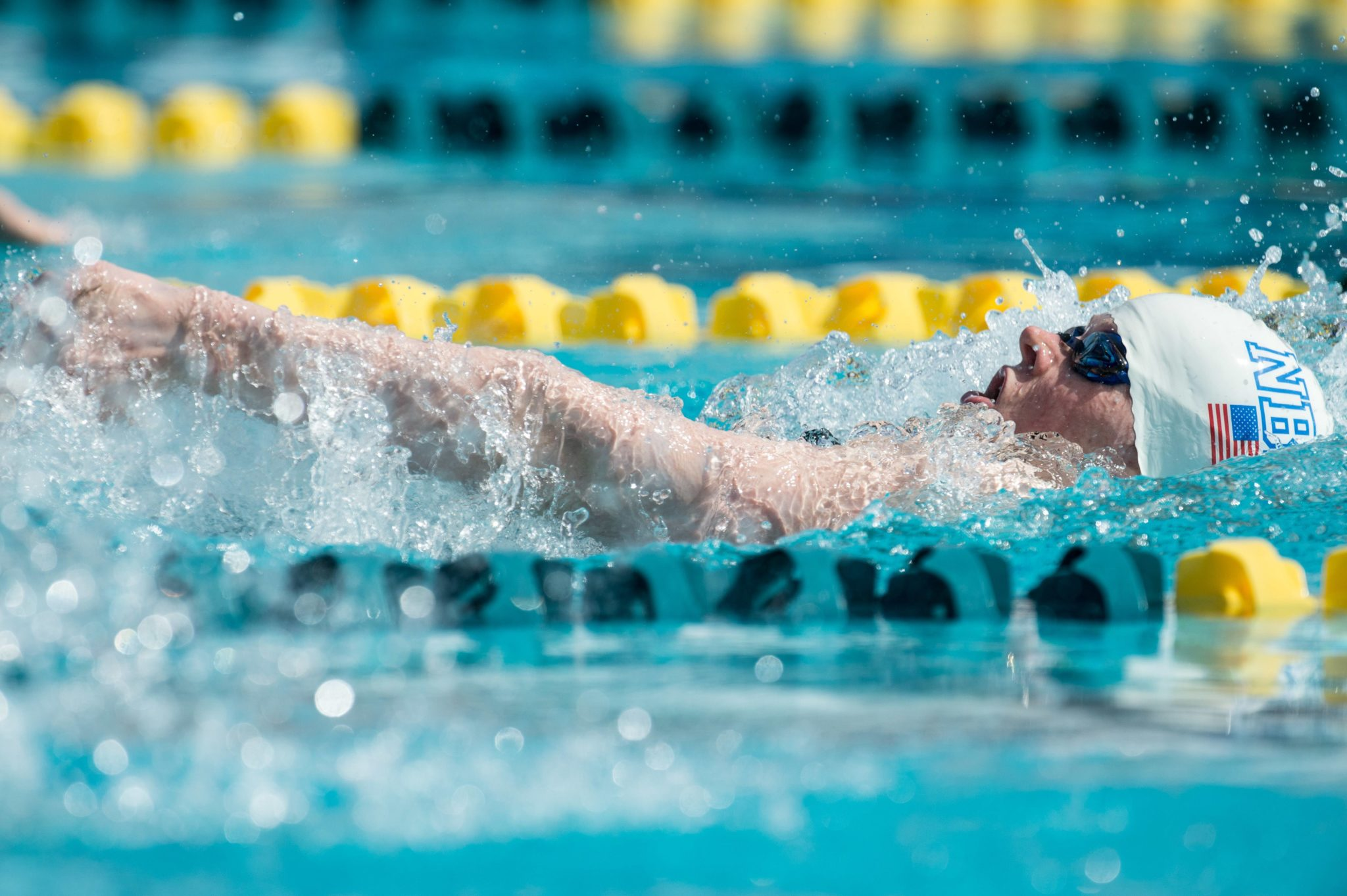
- Mann at the Arena Pro Swim Series in 2014

Personal information
- National team: United States
- Born: November 26, 1997 (age 28) Homer Glen, Illinois
- Height: 5 ft 9 in (175 cm)

Sport
- Sport: Swimming
- Strokes: Freestyle
- Club: Clearwater Aquatic Team North Baltimore Aquatic Club Sun Devil Aquatics
- College team: University of Southern California
- Coach: Randy Reese, Bob Bowman
Medal record
Women's swimming
Representing United States

Rebecca Wilke Mann (born November 26, 1997) is an American open water swimmer and writer.

== Swimming career ==
Mann swam her first 10k at age seven. At age 10, she became the youngest person to swim the 15 kilometer Maui Channel from Maui to Lanai.

In 2011, Mann qualified for the Olympic Trials for open water and pool swimming, one of the youngest swimmers to do so. At the 2012 Olympic Trials, she placed fifth in the 400 IM and 800 freestyle, sixth in the 400 freestyle, and tenth in the 200 butterfly, not qualifying for the 2012 Olympic team, but becoming the youngest person to ever place in the Top 10 in 4 different events.

She trained with Randy Reese at the Clearwater Aquatic Team, then moved to Baltimore to train under Bob Bowman with Michael Phelps and Allison Schmitt at the North Baltimore Aquatic Club. She swam for University of Southern California for two years before going pro, when she returned to training under Bowman at Sun Devil Aquatics.

Mann is a National Champion, having won gold in the 10k at USA Swimming Open Water Nationals in both 2014 and 2015.

Mann competed at the 2012 FINA World Swimming Championships, placing 6th in the 800 freestyle and 9th in the 400 IM. She competed at the 2012 FINA Swimming World Cup, winning gold in the 800 meter freestyle at the Berlin stop. At the 2013 World Aquatics Championships, she placed 8th in both the 5k and 10k open water events. At 2015 World Aquatics Championships, she placed 14th in the open water 10k, and 10th in the 800 meter freestyle. At 2017 World Aquatics Championships, she placed 7th in the open water 25k. She also competed at the 2017 Summer Universiade, and 2019 Pan American Games, winning a bronze medal in the 1500 meters.

Mann competed in the 2016 Olympic Trials, but performed poorly due to suffering herniated disks and overtraining shortly before the competition.

In 2019, she became the first person to ever complete the Triple Maui Nui Channel Swim, a 40 mile channel crossing from Mauito Molokai to Lanai back to Maui.

== Early life and education ==
Mann was born in Homer Glen, Illinois. She has two sisters.

Mann was homeschooled through high school in order to focus on her swimming career. Mann then attended University of Southern California, where she studied screenwriting.

== Works ==
- Outside the Lanes: A Pro Swimmer's Story of Resilience, Reinvention, and Redefining Success
- Unruly
- The Stolen Dragon of Quanx
