= 2014 IPC Ice Sledge Hockey Women's International Cup =

Tournament details
- Host country: Canada
- Venue(s): 1 (in 1 host city)
- Dates: November 7–9, 2014
- Teams: 3

Final positions
- Champions: United States
- Runners-up: Canada
- Third place: Europe United

Tournament statistics
- Scoring leader(s): (United States) Kelsey DiClaudio (23 points)

The 2014 IPC Ice Sledge Hockey Women's International Cup was an international women's sledge hockey tournament and the first IPC Ice Sledge Hockey Women's International Cup in history. The event was held from November 7–9, 2014, in Brampton, Ontario, Canada. Three teams took part: the Canada women's national ice sledge hockey team, a unified team from Europe, and the United States women's national ice sledge hockey team. The tournament was sanctioned by the International Paralympic Committee.

The tournament became the Para Ice Hockey Women's World Challenge in 2022.

== Round robin ==
Game 1: United States 3 - 0 Canada

- (USA: Erica Mitchell 2, Kelsey DiClaudio 1)

Game 2: Canada 6 - 1 Europe United

- (CAN: Ashley Goure 2, Corin Metzger 2, Danica McPhee, Geneva Coulter EUR: Annika Santanen)

Game 3: United States 9 - 0 Europe United

- (USA: Erica Mitchell 4, Kelsey DiClaudio 4, Robynne Hill 1)

Game 4: Canada 6 - 3 Europe United

- (CAN: Geneva Coulter 2, Ashley Goure 1, Ally Godin 1, Christina Picton 1, EUR: Annika Santanen 2, Stine Frydenlund 1)

Game 5: United States 4 - 3 Canada

- (USA: Kelsey DiClaudio 3, Morgan Hosbrough, CAN: Ashley Goure 3)

Game 6: United States 6 - 1 Europe United

- (USA: Kelsey DiClaudio 3, Susan Kluting 2, Nina Nissly EUR: Maren Norheim)

== Semifinals ==
Canada 2 - 0 Europe United

- (CAN: Ashley Goure 2)

== Finals ==
United States 5 - 1 Canada

- (USA: Kelsey DiClaudio 4, Erica Mitchell, CAN: Ashley Goure)

== See also ==
- Ice sledge hockey
- Sledge hockey
