= United States women's national ice sledge hockey team =

United States
- Nickname: Team USA
- Association: USA Hockey
- Team colors
- IIHF code: USA

World Championships
- Appearances: 1 (first in 2025)
- Best result: Gold: (2025)

Medal record

World Championship
Gold medal – first place	2025 Slovakia	

IPC International Cup
Gold medal – first place	2014 Canada	

World Challenge
Gold medal – first place	2022 United States	
Gold medal – first place	2023 United States	
Gold medal – first place	2024 Norway	

The United States women's national ice sledge hockey team is the national team representing the United States in women's international sledge hockey. The team competed at the IPC International Cup and now competes at the Women's World Challenge and Women's World Para Ice Hockey Championships. Since the 2018–19 season the team has been under the governance of USA Hockey.

== History ==
The team participated in its first International Paralympic Committee-sanctioned international competition, the IPC Ice Sledge Hockey Women's International Cup, in 2014. The tournament is now known as the Women's World Challenge (a World Para Ice Hockey sanctioned event), whose inaugural tournament was in 2022.

The team participated in the inaugural World Championships in 2025 and won a gold medal.

== See also ==
- Canada women's national ice sledge hockey team
- United States men's national ice sledge hockey team
