= Canada women's national ice sledge hockey team =

Canada
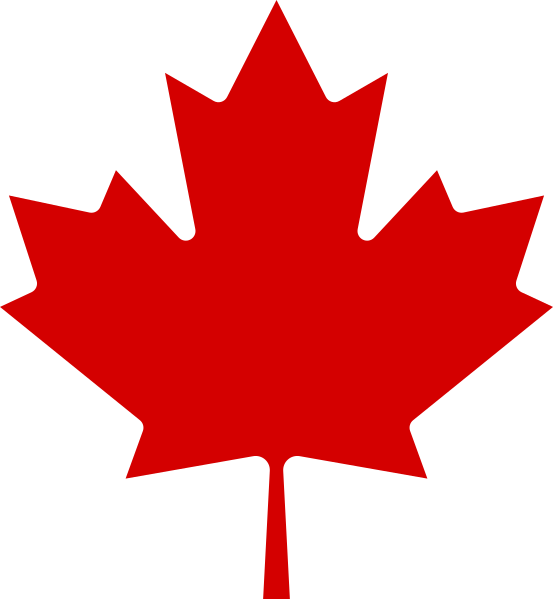
- Nickname: Team Canada (Équipe Canada)
- Association: Independent
- Head coach: Tara Chisholm
- Captain: Christina Picton
- Team colours

World Championships
- Appearances: 1 (first in 2025)
- Best result: Silver: (2025)

Medal record

World Championship
Silver medal – second place	2025 Slovakia	

IPC International Cup
Silver medal – second place	2014 Canada	

World Challenge
Silver medal – second place	2022 United States	
Silver medal – second place	2023 United States	
Silver medal – second place	2024 Norway	

The Canada women's national ice sledge hockey team is the national team representing Canada in women's international sledge hockey. The team competed at the IPC International Cup and now competes at the Women's World Challenge and Women's World Para Ice Hockey Championships. The team currently receives funding from the Hockey Canada Foundation through grants which enables it to run a grassroots development program.

The team participated in its first International Paralympic Committee-sanctioned international competition, the 2014 IPC Ice Sledge Hockey Women's International Cup now known as the Women's World Challenge (a World Para Ice Hockey sanctioned event) whose inaugural year was in 2022.

== History ==
The Ontario Women's Hockey Association began to develop women's ice sledge hockey players in 2008 (at about the same time that the United States started to develop a program). The Ottawa Sledge Hockey Tournament hosted the first all female demonstration ice sledge hockey game on May 5, 2007. The players were composed of a group of Canadian and American women.

=== Events ===
- On October 22, 2011, the national women's sledge hockey team participated in a pair of exhibition games against the Essex-Kent Ice Bullets men's team at the UCCU Complex in Amherstburg, Ontario.
- The national day competed at the Women's Ice Sledge Hockey International Jamboree in Philadelphia from May 9 to 14, 2012. It was the first major Women's Ice Sledge Hockey International competition.

=== IPC Women's International Cup ===
The first ever IPC Ice Sledge Hockey Women's International Cup was the 2014 IPC Ice Sledge Hockey Women's International Cup which took place from November 7–9, 2014 in Brampton, Ontario, Canada. The United States earned the gold medal with a 5–1 victory against Canada in the gold medal game.

=== World Championship ===
The team participated in the inaugural World Championships in 2025 and won a silver medal.

== Funding ==
As the team does not receive overall funding under Hockey Canada, many players participate at their own expense. The national team attempts to compete in three or four events per year, with the team pooling monies raised by players, either through fundraising or out of their own pockets to participate.

== Members ==
- Ashley Goure established herself as an elite player at the International Jamboree in Philadelphia. In her first game against Team Europe, Goure scored a hat trick for an 8–0 win. In the second game, Goure would score a goal in a loss to the United States. On the second day of competition, Goure played in two games, a 5–0 shutout over USA, and a 4–1 triumph over Team Europe. She would score a goal in both contests.

== See also ==
- United States women's national ice sledge hockey team
- Canada men's national ice sledge hockey team
