= Sledge hockey =

Form of ice hockey mainly practiced by people with disabilities

Para ice hockey
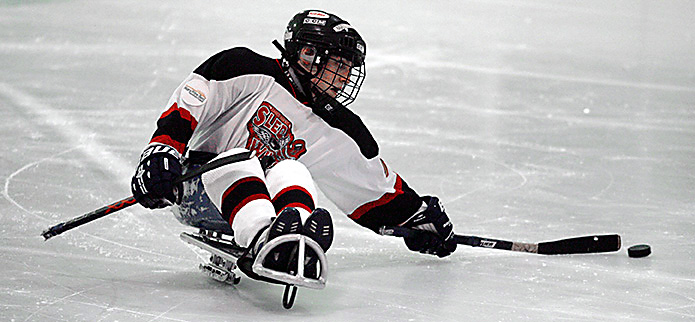
- A player handling the puck
- Highest governing body: World Para Ice Hockey; International Paralympic Committee
- Other names: sledge hockey; sled hockey
- First played: 1960s; 65 years ago, Stockholm, Sweden; First international rules: 1990; 36 years ago

Characteristics
- Contact: Contact sport
- Team members: 2 forwards; 2 defenders; 1 centre; 1 goaltender
- Type: Parasport, winter sport, team sport
- Equipment: ice hockey sledge; carbon fiber sledge hockey sticks; helmet with facemask, shoulder pads, elbow pads, shin guards, ice hockey gloves; pants and footwear based on player's comfort and need; goalies: standard mask, chest and arm protector, blocker pad and catching glove, leg pad if they wish, stick with teeth on the paddle and the knob of the stick; goalies may make modifications to their equipment
- Venue: Ice hockey rink

Presence
- Paralympic: Men's/mixed only
- World Games: No

Para ice hockey, also known as sledge hockey (or sled hockey in American English), is an adaptation of ice hockey for players who have a physical disability. The sport was invented in the early 1960s at a rehabilitation centre in Stockholm, Sweden, and played under similar rules to standard ice hockey. Players are seated on sleds and use special hockey sticks with metal "teeth" on the tips of their handles to navigate the ice. Playing venues use an ice hockey rink.

Para ice hockey has been a part of the Winter Paralympics programme since 1994. Via its division World Para Ice Hockey, the International Paralympic Committee (IPC) acts as the international sanctioning body for the sport. It has been one of the most popular events in the Winter Paralympcs. Since 2016, the IPC has promoted the sport under the name "Para ice hockey" for linguistic reasons, as part of an effort to streamline its sanctioning of the sport outside of the Paralympics.

== History ==
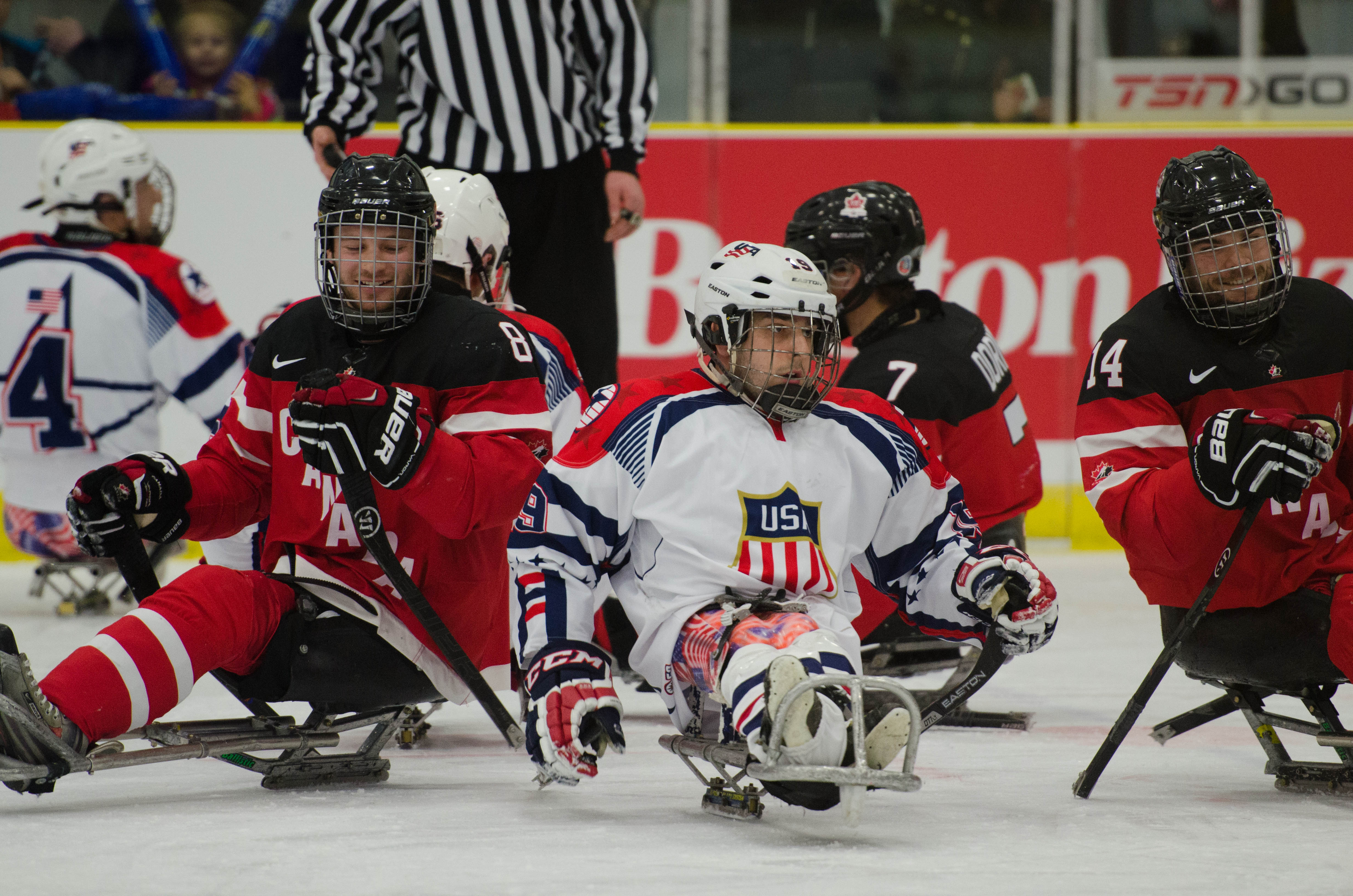
Canadian men's and U.S. men's players competing at the 2015 World Sled Hockey Challenge.

Two men from Sweden designed the sledge in the 1960s because they wanted to continue to play hockey despite their physical disabilities. Their design included two skate blades on a metal frame that allowed the puck to pass underneath. They completed the ensemble by including two round poles with bike handles for sticks. Although there are many restrictions to the measurements and weight of the sleds used in the Paralympic Games, the basic design of modern sleds remains true to the original 1960s simple sleds for kids. These sleds were then made to be used for hockey.

Despite the initial lack of interest and awareness in the few years that followed, competition between sledge hockey teams started up in 1971 that included five teams in Europe. In 1981, Great Britain established their first sledge hockey team, and that was shortly followed by Canada in 1982. It was not until 1990 that the United States developed their first ice sledge hockey team. Sled hockey continued to expand when Estonia and Japan developed their teams in 1993. Sledge hockey was introduced to the Winter Paralympics in 1994, with Sweden claiming the first gold medal. Since 2010, sledge hockey has been a mixed-gender event. Sledge hockey has become one of the most popular events in the Winter Paralympics.

On November 30, 2016, as part of a rebranding of the IPC's self-governed sports under the new World Para Sports name, and citing that the word "sledge" had differing meanings between languages, the International Paralympic Committee announced that it would henceforth refer to sledge hockey as "Para ice hockey". Its sanctioning body would accordingly be renamed World Para Ice Hockey.

== Equipment ==
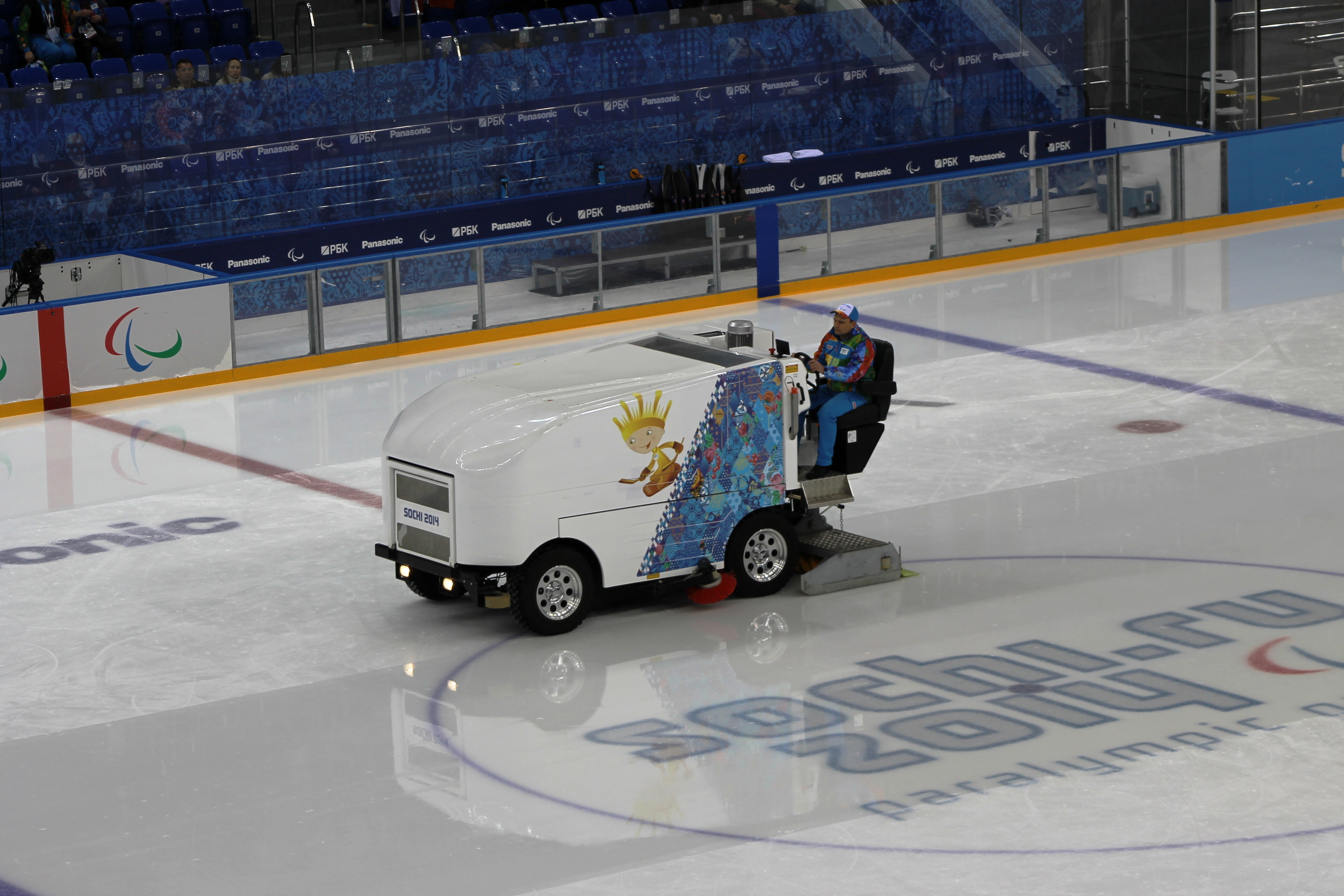
Shayba Arena in its sledge hockey configuration at the 2014 Winter Paralympics: the entrance to the players' benches and penalty boxes are flush with the ice surface, to make it easier for players to enter them. The floors are coated in ice or smooth plastic to prevent damage to the sledges.

The sticks have a blade curved at one end in a manner similar to regular ice hockey, and generally six to eight metal teeth at the opposite end of the blade for maneuvering and propulsion. Movement is achieved by using the metal teeth as a means to grip the ice and push oneself forward. The metal teeth cannot be too pointy nor protrude farther than 1 centimetre (0.39 in) beyond the stick, to prevent damage to the ice and injury of other players. Other equipment includes a helmet with facemask, shoulder and elbow pads, shin guards, and hockey gloves. Pants and footwear are at the discretion of both the player's comfort and need. Goaltenders wear the standard mask, chest and arm protector, blocker pad and catching glove, plus a leg pad if they so desire and a stick with teeth on both the paddle as well as the knob of the stick. Additionally, goalies may make modifications to their equipment: a common mod is to attach the plastic outsoles of track spikes onto the outer part of their gloves to aid in lateral mobility.

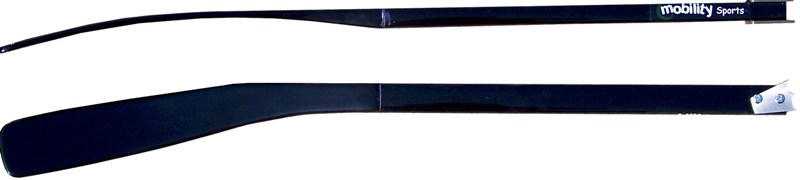
Carbon fiber Para ice hockey sticks

== Rules ==
Essentially all of the standard rules of ice hockey apply to Para ice hockey. The differences are those necessitated by the ice sled and the athlete. The first set of international rules was created in 1990 and were drafted from Canadian rules. Teeing and ramming are two penalties which are unique to Para ice hockey: Teeing is the act of charging an opponent using any part of the front radius of the sled, and ramming is when a player "intentionally lifts or raises the front nose of the sled, intentionally turns up the under part of the sled towards an opponent, or intentionally exposes a sled blade and collides with another player" and is "[a] Minor, Misconduct, or a Major plus a Game Misconduct penalty, at the discretion of the referee." Pushers must wear a team jersey and safety equipment, and cannot exceed the speed of the average player on the ice nor can they enter the "house" (the area extending from the goal crease to the end-zone faceoff dots, extended to the top of the faceoff circles) while in the defensive zone.

Games are divided into three 15-minute periods. If there is a tie at the end of regulation time, it is followed by overtime, and if still tied after the overtime period, a shootout occurs to determine the winning team.

== Women's sledge hockey ==
The United States women's national ice sledge hockey team is run by USA Hockey; however, the Canada women's national ice sledge hockey team is run independently and does not receive federal funding. The two groups are primarily responsible for promoting women's sledge hockey internationally.

While Para ice hockey at the Paralympics has been a mixed-gender event since 2010, only three female players have participated in the Paralympic tournament as of 2022, including Norwegian players Britt Mjaasund Øyen (1994; the event had not been explicitly designated as a men's event that year) and Lena Schroeder (2018), and Chinese player Yu Jing (2022; Jing would only play in one game). In 2006, Amanda Ahrnbom had been named to the Swedish roster, but was deemed ineligible shortly prior to the Games as the event was only open to male players. As of 2022, teams consisting entirely of male players are allowed to send seventeen players, but can send eighteen players if a woman is included.

While the inclusion of women on otherwise-male teams has been considered an important step forward for the sport, criticism has been raised regarding the slow development and lack of concentrated efforts to promote women's sledge hockey—especially outside of the Paralympics. Peggy Assinck, a member of the Canadian national team, argued that the mixed format at the Paralympics has actually been detrimental to the development of women's sledge hockey development, stating that "the argument has always been, 'Well, there is a place for them. They just haven’t broken (onto) the roster yet.' And in a full-contact sport, that’s a lot to ask".

The first IPC Ice Sledge Hockey Women's International Cup was held in 2014. In 2022, the event was succeeded by the Para Ice Hockey Women's World Challenge.

== See also ==
- Para ice hockey at the Winter Paralympics
- World Para Ice Hockey Championships
- Para Hockey Cup
- World Para Ice Hockey European Championships
- British Para Ice Hockey Association, the governing body for the sport in Great Britain
- USA Warriors, a Para ice hockey team consisting of combat-wounded U.S. soldiers
- Power hockey, electric wheelchair hockey
- Ice sledge racing, a sport that uses the same sticks and sledges for racing instead of hockey
