= South Korea at the 2018 Winter Paralympics =

- IPC code: KOR
- NPC: Korean Paralympic Committee
- Website: www.kosad.or.kr (in Korean)

in PyeongChang
- Competitors: 36 (Note: Choi Bo-gue, Kwon Sang-hyeon, Lee Jeong-min, Sin Eui-hyun, Lee Do-yeon, and Seo Vo-ra-mi will take part in two sports biathlon and cross-country skiing.) in 6 sports
- Flag bearer: Sin Eui-hyun
- Medals Ranked 16th: Gold 1 Silver 0 Bronze 2 Total 3

Winter Paralympics appearances (overview)
- 1992; 1994; 1998; 2002; 2006; 2010; 2014; 2018; 2022; 2026

South Korea competed at the 2018 Winter Paralympics in Pyeongchang, South Korea, from 9–18 March 2018, as the host nation. In February 2018, the IPC recommended North Korea participate, and so North Korea made its Winter Paralympic debut. Teams representing South Korea and North Korea had planned to enter the Opening Ceremony marching under the Korean Unification Flag; however, talks between the two teams failed to do so, and they entered separately in the opening ceremony under their own respective flags.

== Competitors ==
The following is the list of number of competitors participating at the Games per sport.

Sport	Men	Women	Total
Alpine skiing	3	1	4
Biathlon	4	2	6
Cross-country skiing	4	2	6
Ice sledge hockey	17	0	17
Snowboarding	4	0	4
Wheelchair curling	4	1	5
Total	36	6	42

== Medalists ==
Medal	Name	Sport	Event	Date
Gold	Sin Eui-hyun	Cross-country skiing	Men's 7.5 km, sitting	17 March
Bronze	Sin Eui-hyun	Cross-country skiing	Men's 15 km, sitting	11 March
Bronze	South Korea national para ice hockey team: Cho Byeong-seok; Cho Young-jae; Choi Kwang-hyouk; Choi Si-woo; Han Min-su; Jang Dong-shin; Jang Jong-ho; Jung Seung-hwan; Kim Dea-jung; Kim Young-sung; Lee Hae-man; Lee Jae-woong; Lee Ji-hoon; Lee Jong-kyung; Lee Ju-seung; Lee Yong-min; Yu Man-gyun	Para ice hockey	Mixed team	17 March

== Alpine skiing ==
- Han Sang-min
- Hwang Min-gyu
- Lee Chi-won
- Yang Jae-rim

== Biathlon ==
- Choi Bo-gue
- Kwon Sang-hyeon
- Lee Jeong-min
- Sin Eui-hyun
- Lee Do-yeon
- Seo Vo-ra-mi

== Cross-country skiing ==
- Choi Bo-gue
- Kwon Sang-hyeon
- Lee Jeong-min
- Sin Eui-hyun
- Lee Do-yeon
- Seo Vo-ra-mi

== Para ice hockey ==
Summary

Key:

- OT – Overtime
- GWS – Match decided by penalty-shootout

Team	Group stage				Semifinal / Pl.	Final / BM / Pl.	
Team	Opposition Score	Opposition Score	Opposition Score	Rank	Opposition Score	Opposition Score	Rank
South Korea men's	Japan; W 4–1	Czech Republic; W 3–2 OT	United States; L 0–8	2 QS	Canada; L 0–7	Italy; W 1–0	3rd place, bronze medalist(s)

Preliminary round

Pos	Team	Pld	W	OTW	OTL	L	GF	GA	GD	Pts	Qualification
1	United States	3	3	0	0	0	28	0	+28	9	Semifinals
2	South Korea (H)	3	1	1	0	1	7	11	−4	5	Semifinals
3	Czech Republic	3	1	0	1	1	5	13	−8	4	5–8th place semifinals
4	Japan	3	0	0	0	3	1	17	−16	0	5–8th place semifinals

Source: PyeongChang 2018
(H) Host

10 March 2018; 15:30	South Korea	4–1 (0–0, 1–0, 3–1)	Japan	Gangneung Hockey Centre; Attendance: 6,022

Game reference

Yu Man-gyun
Goalies
Shinobu Fukushima
Referee:
(Norway) Owe Lüthcke
Linesmen:
(Canada) Matt Clark
(Czech Republic) Leon Wesley

Jang D. (Kim Y., Jang J.) (PP) – 21:08	1–0
Jung – 30:51	2–0
Cho Y. (Cho B., Jung) – 35:56	3–0
Lee H. (Jang D., Lee Ji.) (PP) – 40:31	4–0
	4–1	42:53 – Takahashi (Uehara, Kumagai) (PP)

12 min
Penalties
14 min
24
Shots
7

11 March 2018; 15:30	South Korea	3–2 OT (0–0, 1–0, 1–2) (OT: 1–0)	Czech Republic	Gangneung Hockey Centre; Attendance: 5,187

Game reference

Yu Man-gyun
Goalies
Michal Vápenka
Referee:
(United States) Jonathan Morrison
Linesmen:
(Canada) Matthew Fergenbaum
(Sweden) Andreas Lundén

Lee Ju. (Jang J., Jung) – 18:28	1–0
	1–1	38:55 – Geier (Kubeš) (SH)
Jung (Lee Jo.) – 42:53	2–1
	2–2	44:21 – Geier (Kubeš, Doležal) (EA)
Jung (Jang D., Cho Y.) – 45:13	3–2

8 min
Penalties
8 min
22
Shots
10

13 March 2018; 12:00	United States	8–0 (6–0, 0–0, 2–0)	South Korea	Gangneung Hockey Centre; Attendance: 6,588

Game reference

Steve Cash
Goalies
Yu Man-gyun
Lee Jae-woong
Referee:
(Canada) Kevin Webinger
Linesmen:
(Canada) Matt Clark
(Canada) Matthew Fergenbaum

Roybal (Farmer, Landeros) (PP) – 04:51	1–0
Farmer (Wallace, DeQuebec) – 06:40	2–0
Misiewicz (Pauls, Landeros) (PP) – 08:09	3–0
Misiewicz (McKee, Roybal) – 09:57	4–0
Farmer (Roybal) (SH) – 12:27	5–0
Farmer (Roybal, Carron) (SH)– 13:37	6–0
Dodson (Carron, Roman) – 33:36	7–0
Roybal (McKee) – 40:07	8–0

8 min
Penalties
12 min
24
Shots
4

Semifinal

15 March 2018; 12:00	Canada	7–0 (4–0, 1–0, 2–0)	South Korea	Gangneung Hockey Centre; Attendance: 6,603

Game reference

Corbin Watson
Dominic Larocque
Goalies
Lee Jae-woong
Referee:
(Austria) Kristijan Nikolic
Linesmen:
(Sweden) Andreas Lundén
(Austria) David Nothegger

Hickey (Bridges) – 04:17	1–0
Cozzolino – 06:00	2–0
Westlake (Cozzolino, McGregor) – 13:25	3–0
Bridges (Delaney, Armstrong) – 14:19	4–0
Bridges (McGregor, Dixon) (PP) – 18:42	5–0
McGregor (Westlake) – 35:48	6–0
McGregor (Armstrong, Cozzolino) – 42:41	7–0

8 min
Penalties
2 min
24
Shots
2

Bronze medal game

17 March 2018; 12:00	South Korea	1–0 (0–0, 0–0, 1–0)	Italy	Gangneung Hockey Centre; Attendance: 6,534

Game reference
Lee Jae-woong	Goalies	Gabriele Araudo	Referee: (United States) Johnathan Morrison; Linesmen: (Canada) Matt Clark (Canada) Matthew Fergenbaum
Jang D. (Jung, Lee Jo.) – 41:42 / 1–0			Referee: (United States) Johnathan Morrison; Linesmen: (Canada) Matt Clark (Canada) Matthew Fergenbaum
2 min	Penalties	2 min	Referee: (United States) Johnathan Morrison; Linesmen: (Canada) Matt Clark (Canada) Matthew Fergenbaum
14	Shots	9	Referee: (United States) Johnathan Morrison; Linesmen: (Canada) Matt Clark (Canada) Matthew Fergenbaum

== Snowboarding ==
- Choi Suk-min
- Kim Yun-ho
- Park Hang-seung
- Park Su-hyeok

== Wheelchair curling ==
Summary

Team	Event	Group stage												Tiebreaker	Semifinal	Final / BM	
Team	Event	Opposition Score	Opposition Score	Opposition Score	Opposition Score	Opposition Score	Opposition Score	Opposition Score	Opposition Score	Opposition Score	Opposition Score	Opposition Score	Rank	Opposition Score	Opposition Score	Opposition Score	Rank
Cha Jae-goan; Jung Seung-won; Seo Soon-seok; Bang Min-ja; Lee Dong-ha	Mixed	(United States) USA; W 8–3	(International Paralympic Committee) NPA; W 6–5	(Slovakia) SVK; W 7–5	(Canada) CAN; W 7–5	(Germany) GER; L 3–4	(Finland) FIN; W 11–3	(Switzerland) SUI; W 6–5	(Norway) NOR; L 2–9	(Sweden) SWE; W 4–2	(United Kingdom) GBR; W 5–4	(China) CHN; W 7–6	1 Q	—N/a	(Norway) NOR; L 6–8	(Canada) CAN; L 3–5	4

Pos	Team	Pld	W	L	PF	PA	PD	PCT	Ends Won	Ends Lost	Blank Ends	Stolen Ends	Shot %	Qualification
1	South Korea	11	9	2	65	51	14	0.818	38	36	9	11	66%	Advance to playoffs
2	Canada	11	9	2	74	45	29	0.818	47	28	6	27	62%	Advance to playoffs
3	China	11	9	2	85	42	43	0.818	43	32	2	16	67%	Advance to playoffs
4	Norway	11	7	4	55	57	−2	0.636	41	35	5	15	58%	Advance to playoffs
5	Neutral Paralympic Athletes	11	5	6	61	63	−2	0.455	44	37	2	23	62%	
6	Switzerland	11	5	6	56	63	−7	0.455	36	45	2	11	61%	
7	Great Britain	11	5	6	57	53	4	0.455	41	41	6	20	62%	
8	Germany	11	5	6	57	68	−11	0.455	37	39	5	16	54%	
9	Slovakia	11	4	7	62	72	−10	0.364	39	46	1	11	57%	
10	Sweden	11	4	7	47	66	−19	0.364	29	45	8	8	57%	
11	Finland	11	2	9	53	87	−34	0.182	35	46	1	11	51%	
12	United States	11	2	9	58	63	−5	0.182	37	45	3	12	60%	

Source: Paralympic.org

Round-robin

South Korea has a bye in draws 3, 5, 7, 10, 12 and 17.

Draw 1

Saturday, 10 March, 14:35

Sheet C	1	2	3	4	5	6	7	8	Final
United States (Black) 🔨	0	0	0	1	0	0	2	X	3
South Korea (Seo)	0	1	1	0	4	1	0	X	8

Draw 2

Saturday, 10 March, 19:35

Sheet B	1	2	3	4	5	6	7	8	EE	Final
South Korea (Seo)	1	0	1	0	2	0	0	1	1	6
Neutral Paralympic Athletes (Kurokhtin) 🔨	0	2	0	1	0	1	1	0	0	5

Draw 4

Sunday, 11 March, 14:35

Sheet D	1	2	3	4	5	6	7	8	Final
Slovakia (Ďuriš)	2	0	2	0	0	1	0	0	5
South Korea (Seo) 🔨	0	3	0	1	0	0	1	2	7

Draw 6

Monday, 12 March, 09:35

Sheet A	1	2	3	4	5	6	7	8	Final
South Korea (Seo) 🔨	3	0	0	1	0	3	0	X	7
Canada (Ideson)	0	0	1	0	2	0	2	X	5

Draw 8

Monday, 12 March, 19:35

Sheet D	1	2	3	4	5	6	7	8	Final
South Korea (Seo)	0	0	0	0	2	0	0	1	3
Germany (Putzich) 🔨	1	0	1	1	0	0	1	0	4

Draw 9

Tuesday, 13 March, 09:35

Sheet A	1	2	3	4	5	6	7	8	Final
Finland (S. Karjalainen)	0	0	1	1	0	1	0	X	3
South Korea (Seo) 🔨	4	0	0	0	4	0	3	X	11

Draw 11

Tuesday, 13 March, 19:35

Sheet C	1	2	3	4	5	6	7	8	Final
Switzerland (Wagner)	0	1	0	1	1	0	1	1	5
South Korea (Seo) 🔨	2	0	1	0	0	3	0	0	6

Draw 13

Wednesday, 14 March, 14:35

Sheet B	1	2	3	4	5	6	7	8	Final
South Korea (Seo)	0	2	0	0	0	0	X	X	2
Norway (Lorentsen) 🔨	2	0	0	2	1	4	X	X	9

Draw 14

Wednesday, 14 March, 19:35

Sheet C	1	2	3	4	5	6	7	8	Final
South Korea (Seo)	1	1	0	1	0	0	1	X	4
Sweden (Petersson Dahl) 🔨	0	0	1	0	1	0	0	X	2

Draw 15

Thursday, 15 March, 9:35

Sheet D	1	2	3	4	5	6	7	8	Final
Great Britain (Neilson)	1	0	0	2	1	0	0	0	4
South Korea (Seo) 🔨	0	2	0	0	0	1	1	1	5

Draw 16

Thursday, 15 March, 14:35

Sheet B	1	2	3	4	5	6	7	8	Final
China (Wang)	0	1	0	4	0	0	1	0	6
South Korea (Seo) 🔨	2	0	1	0	1	2	0	1	7

Semifinal

Friday, 16 March, 15:35

Sheet C	1	2	3	4	5	6	7	8	EE	Final
South Korea (Seo) 🔨	0	2	0	2	0	0	0	2	0	6
Norway (Lorentsen)	1	0	3	0	0	0	2	0	2	8

Bronze medal game

Saturday, 17 March, 9:35

Sheet B	1	2	3	4	5	6	7	8	Final
South Korea (Seo) 🔨	0	0	1	0	1	0	1	X	3
Canada (Ideson)	2	0	0	2	0	1	0	X	5

== See also ==
- South Korea at the 2018 Winter Olympics
