= Japan at the 2018 Winter Paralympics =

- IPC code: JPN
- NPC: Japan Paralympic Committee
- Website: www.jsad.or.jp (in Japanese)

in Pyeongchang
- Competitors: 38 in 5 sports
- Flag bearer: Momoka Muraoka (opening)
- Medals Ranked 9th: Gold 3 Silver 4 Bronze 3 Total 10

Winter Paralympics appearances (overview)
- 1976; 1980; 1984; 1988; 1992; 1994; 1998; 2002; 2006; 2010; 2014; 2018; 2022; 2026

Japan sent competitors to the 2018 Winter Paralympics in Pyeongchang, South Korea. The group from Japan competed in para-alpine skiing, para-Nordic skiing, para-snowboarding and sledge hockey.

== Medalists ==
The following Japanese competitors won medals at the games. In the discipline sections below, the medalists' names are bolded.

Medal	Name	Sport	Event	Date
Gold	Momoka Muraoka	Alpine skiing	Women's giant slalom, sitting	14 March
Gold	Gurimu Narita	Snowboarding	Men's banked slalom, SB-LL2	16 March
Gold	Yoshihiro Nitta	Cross country skiing	Men's 10 kilometre classical, standing	17 March
Silver	Momoka Muraoka	Alpine skiing	Women's downhill, sitting	10 March
Silver	Taiki Morii	Alpine skiing	Men's downhill, sitting	10 March
Silver	Yoshihiro Nitta	Cross country skiing	Men's 1.5 km sprint classical, standing	14 March
Silver	Momoka Muraoka	Alpine skiing	Women's slalom, sitting	18 March
Bronze	Momoka Muraoka	Alpine skiing	Women's super-G, sitting	11 March
Bronze	Gurimu Narita	Snowboarding	Men's snowboard cross, SB-LL2	12 March
Bronze	Momoka Muraoka	Alpine skiing	Women's super combined, sitting	13 March

== Team ==
There were three announcements with who would go to the 2018 Winter Games representing Japan. The second announcement was made on 8 February 2018. The last announcement was made on 18 February 2018. The last announcement said two male para-alpine skiers would be going to South Korea. The country has the third largest team among all nations. It has 38 people.

The table below contains the list of members of people (called "Team Japan") that will be participating in the 2018 Games.

Team Japan
Name	Sport	Classification	Events	ref
Gurimu Narita	para-snowboarding	SB-LL2		
Keiichi Sato	para-Nordic skiing		biathlon, cross country skiing	
Atsushi Yamamoto	para-snowboarding			

== Para-Nordic skiing ==
=== Skiers ===
Keiichi Sato competes in two sports: para-triathlon and para-Nordic skiing. The first sport he did was para-Nordic skiing. As a member of Team Japan, he went to the 2010 and 2014 Winter Paralympics. After para-triathlon became a Paralympic sport, Sato decided to try it. He then was part of Team Japan at the 2016 Summer Paralympics. He then went to the 2017 Triathlon World Championships. After that, he stopped competing in para-triathlon. He wanted to try to medal at the 2018 Winter Paralympics. He thought he needed to focus on para-Nordic skiing to do that.

=== Schedule and results ===
On 12 March, the 15 km race takes place, with standing and vision impaired women starting at 10:00 PM. Thee sprint classic qualification takes place on 14 March from 10:00 AM – 11:25 AM for both men and women in all classes. It is followed in the afternoon by the semifinals and finals. The classic race takes place on 17 March. The standing and visually impaired women's race takes place from 10:00 AM - 12:30.

== Para-snowboarding ==
=== Snowboarders ===
Atsushi Yamamoto is a track and field competitor. He won a silver medal in the men's T42 long jump at the 2016 Summer Paralympics. In November 2017, he went to the World Para Snowboard World Cup in Landgraaf, Netherlands. The World Cup was his first para-snowboarding competition. Also there was Daniel Wagner of Denmark. Wagner won gold in the event which Yamamoto won silver. Both men had decided to compete internationally in snowboarding during the same year.

=== Schedule and results ===
The snowboard cross event starts on 12 March. It goesfrom 10:30 AM to 5:00 PM for all classes for both men and women. The slalom race is scheduled to take place on 16 March, going from 10:30 AM – 4:55 PM for men and women in all classes.

== Para ice hockey ==
Summary

Key:

- OT – Overtime
- GWS – Match decided by penalty-shootout

Team	Group stage				Semifinal / Pl.	Final / BM / Pl.	
Team	Opposition Score	Opposition Score	Opposition Score	Rank	Opposition Score	Opposition Score	Rank
Japan men's	South Korea; L 1–4	United States; L 0–10	Czech Republic; L 0–3	4	Norway; L 1–6	Sweden; L 1–5	8

Mixed Tournament

=== Roster ===
Japan's team has 17 men. Their coach is Kojin Nakakita.

Team Japan
Name	Position	Role	Past Games	ref
Mikio Annaka	forward		2014	
Shinobu Fukushima	goaltender		2014	
Susumu Hirose	forward			
Wataru Horie	forward			
Hideaki Ishii	defenseman			
Nao Kodama	forward			
Masaharu Kumagai	forward	alternate captain		
Eiji Misawa	defenseman		2014	
Kazuya Mochizuki	goaltender			
Keisuke Nagumo	forward			
Toshiyuki Nakamura	defenseman			
Taimei Shiba	forward		2014	
Yoshihiro Shioya	forward			
Satoru Sudo	defenseman	captain	2014	
Kazuhiro Takahashi	forward	alternate captain	2014	
Daisuke Uehara	defenseman		2014	
Mamoru Yoshikawa	forward		2014	

=== Qualification ===
Japan, Sweden and the Czech Republic were the last 3 teams that were able to go to the 2018 Games. They could go because of how they finished at the Qualification Tournament in October in Ostersund, Sweden in October 2017.

Preliminary round

Pos	Team	Pld	W	OTW	OTL	L	GF	GA	GD	Pts	Qualification
1	United States	3	3	0	0	0	28	0	+28	9	Semifinals
2	South Korea (H)	3	1	1	0	1	7	11	−4	5	Semifinals
3	Czech Republic	3	1	0	1	1	5	13	−8	4	5–8th place semifinals
4	Japan	3	0	0	0	3	1	17	−16	0	5–8th place semifinals

Source: PyeongChang 2018
(H) Host

10 March 2018; 15:30	South Korea	4–1 (0–0, 1–0, 3–1)	Japan	Gangneung Hockey Centre; Attendance: 6,022

Game reference

Yu Man-gyun
Goalies
Shinobu Fukushima
Referee:
(Norway) Owe Lüthcke
Linesmen:
(Canada) Matt Clark
(Czech Republic) Leon Wesley

Jang D. (Kim Y., Jang J.) (PP) – 21:08	1–0
Jung – 30:51	2–0
Cho Y. (Cho B., Jung) – 35:56	3–0
Lee H. (Jang D., Lee Ji.) (PP) – 40:31	4–0
	4–1	42:53 – Takahashi (Uehara, Kumagai) (PP)

12 min
Penalties
14 min
24
Shots
7

11 March 2018; 12:00	United States	10–0 (3–0, 6–0, 1–0)	Japan	Gangneung Hockey Centre; Attendance: 5,435

Game reference

Jen Lee
Goalies
Shinobu Fukushima
Kazuya Mochizuki
Referee:
(Austria) Kristijan Nikolic
Linesmen:
(Canada) Matt Clark
(South Korea) Han Youl

McKee (Landeros) – 01:01	1–0
Roybal (Misiewicz) – 04:34	2–0
Grove (Farmer, DeQuebec) – 12:26	3–0
Landeros (Roybal, Farmer) (PP) – 20:25	4–0
Farmer – 20:55	5–0
McDermott (Page, DeQuebec) – 23:20	6–0
Roman (Page, Pauls) – 23:54	7–0
Roybal (Misiewicz) – 24:02	8–0
Roybal (McKee, Misiewicz) – 24:49	9–0
Wallace (Farmer, Pauls) – 38:25	10–0

2 min
Penalties
4 min
24
Shots
2

13 March 2018; 19:00	Czech Republic	3–0 (0–0, 1–0, 2–0)	Japan	Gangneung Hockey Centre; Attendance: 4,569

Game reference

Michal Vápenka
Goalies
Shinobu Fukushima
Referee:
(United States) Jonathan Morrison
Linesmen:
(South Korea) Han Youl
(Sweden) Andreas Lundén

Kubeš (Hábl) – 27:26	1–0
Šafránek (Hrbek, Krupička) – 33:11	2–0
Kubeš (ENG) – 44:42	3–0

4 min
Penalties
4 min
11
Shots
5

5–8th place semifinal

14 March 2018; 20:00	Norway	6–1 (2–0, 3–1, 1–0)	Japan	Gangneung Hockey Centre; Attendance: 3,919

Game reference

Kjell Christian Hamar
Goalies
Shinobu Fukushima
Kazuya Mochizuki
Referee:
(Canada) Johnathan Morrison
Linesmen:
(Czech Republic) Jan Vaněk
(Czech Republic) Leon Wesley

Bakke (Øiseth) (PP) – 02:25	1–0
Pedersen (Bøgle, Nordstoga) – 09:37	2–0
	2–1	18:20 – Takahashi (Horie) (SH)
Bøgle – 18:34	3–1
Pedersen (Hamre) – 18:55	4–1
Bakke (Værnes, Bøgle) – 20:02	5–1
Pedersen (Bøgle, Nordstoga) – 35:28	6–1

0 min
Penalties
4 min
14
Shots
6

Seventh place game

16 March 2018; 16:00	Japan	1–5 (0–1, 1–2, 0–2)	Sweden	Gangneung Hockey Centre; Attendance: 5,979

Game reference

Shinobu Fukushima
Goalies
Ulf Nilsson
Referee:
(Norway) Owe Lüthcke
Linesmen:
(Czech Republic) Jan Vaněk
(Czech Republic) Leon Wesley

	0–1	00:52 – Gyllsten (Kasperi, Meng)
Takahashi (Uehara) – 16:25	1–1
	1–2	19:19 – Ingvarsson (Meng, Kasperi) (PP)
	1–3	27:33 – Kasperi (Hedberg) (SH)
	1–4	37:24 – Holm (Rakos, Kasperi)
	1–5	44:17 – Ingvarsson (Gyllsten, P. Nilsson)

4 min
Penalties
4 min
10
Shots
14

== Media and television ==
For the first time, the Paralympic Games will be live on television. The 2018 Games will be on NHK. People can watch on NHK General TV and NHK Educational TV channels. Some will be televised with a resolution of 8K. There are going to be 62 hours of live coverage.
