= South Korea at the 2014 Winter Paralympics =

- IPC code: KOR
- NPC: Korean Paralympic Committee
- Website: www.kosad.or.kr (in Korean)

in Sochi
- Competitors: 27 in 4 sports
- Medals: Gold 0 Silver 0 Bronze 0 Total 0

Winter Paralympics appearances (overview)
- 1992; 1994; 1998; 2002; 2006; 2010; 2014; 2018; 2022; 2026

South Korea competed at the 2014 Winter Paralympics in Sochi, Russia, held between 7–16 March 2014.

== Alpine skiing ==
Men

Athlete	Event	Run 1			Run 2			Final/Total		
Athlete	Event	Time	Diff	Rank	Time	Diff	Rank	Time	Diff	Rank
Lee Chi-won	Slalom, sitting	DNF								
Lee Chi-won	Giant slalom, sitting	DNF								
Park Jong-seork	Downhill, sitting	—N/a						1:37.61	+13.81	12
Park Jong-seork	Super-G, sitting	—N/a						DNF		
Park Jong-seork	Combined, sitting	DSQ								
Park Jong-seork	Slalom, sitting	1:04.61	+11.87	22	DNF					
Park Jong-seork	Giant slalom, sitting	DNF								

Women

Athlete	Event	Run 1			Run 2			Final/Total		
Athlete	Event	Time	Diff	Rank	Time	Diff	Rank	Time	Diff	Rank
Yang Jae-rim; Guide: Lee Ji-youl	Slalom, visually impaired	DNF								
Yang Jae-rim; Guide: Lee Ji-youl	Giant slalom, visually impaired	1:36.82	+8.20	4	1:29.08	+9.07	6	3:05.90	+17.27	4

== Cross-country skiing ==
Men

Athlete	Event	Qualification			Semifinal		Final		
Athlete	Event	Real Time	Result	Rank	Result	Rank	Real Time	Result	Rank
Choi Bo-gue; Guide: Seo Jeong-ryun	1km sprint classic, visually impaired	5:17.21	5:17.21	17	did not qualify				
Choi Bo-gue; Guide: Seo Jeong-ryun	10km free, visually impaired	—N/a					35:24.2	35:24.2	18

Women

Athlete	Event	Qualification			Semifinal		Final		
Athlete	Event	Real Time	Result	Rank	Result	Rank	Real Time	Result	Rank
Seo Vo-ra-mi	1km sprint classic, sitting	3:47.67	3:24.90	20	did not qualify				
Seo Vo-ra-mi	5km, sitting	—N/a					24:36.9	22:09.2	20

Relay

Athletes	Event	Final	
Athletes	Event	Time	Rank
Choi Bo-gue; Guide: Seo Jeong-ryun; Seo Vo-ra-mi	4 x 2.5km mixed relay	37:21.3	9

== Ice sledge hockey ==
Team

- Cho Byeong-seok
- Cho Young-jae
- Choi Bae-suk
- Chung Young-hoon
- Han Min-su
- Jang Dong-shin
- Jang Jong-ho
- Jung Seung-hwan
- Kim Dea-jung
- Kim Young-sung
- Lee Jong-kyung
- Lee Ju-seung
- Lee Yong-min
- Park Sang-hyeon
- Park Woo-chul
- Sa Sung-keun
- Yu Man-gyun

Preliminaries

Pos	Team	Pld	W	OTW	OTL	L	GF	GA	GD	Pts	Qualification
1	Russia (H)	3	2	0	1	0	11	4	+7	7	Semifinals
2	United States	3	2	0	0	1	9	3	+6	6	Semifinals
3	Italy	3	1	0	0	2	3	13	−10	3	5–8th place semifinals
4	South Korea	3	0	1	0	2	4	7	−3	2	5–8th place semifinals

Source: Sochi 2014
(H) Host

8 March 2014; 20:00	Russia	2–3 GWS (1–0, 1–1, 0–1) (OT: 0–0) (SO: 0–1)	South Korea	Shayba Arena; Attendance: 3,815

Game reference

Mikhail Ivanov
Goalies
Yu Man-gyun
Referee:
(United States) Derek Berkebile
Linesmen:
(Norway) Espen Nyberget
(Czech Republic) Leon Wesley

Varlakov (Amosov, Petrov) – 14:19	1–0
Petrov (Varlakov) – 29:03	2–0
	2–1	29:24 – Han (Jung, Park W.) (PP)
	2–2	32:12 – Cho B. (Jung, Park W.) (PP)

Selyukin (miss)
Lisov
Petrov
Lisov (miss)
Shootout
Cho Y.
Jung
(miss) Lee Jo.
Han
6 min
Penalties
6 min
21
Shots
9

9 March 2014; 16:30	United States	3–0 (2–0, 1–0, 0–0)	South Korea	Shayba Arena; Attendance: 5,305

Game reference

Steve Cash
Goalies
Yu Man-gyun
Referee:
(Czech Republic) Jan Vaněk
Linesmen:
(Czech Republic) Leon Wesley
(Russia) Sergey Yudakov

Chace – 00:57	1–0
Page (McCoy) – 11:51	2–0
Page (McCoy, Cash) – 29:29	3–0

6 min
Penalties
4 min
18
Shots
9

11 March 2014; 09:30	South Korea	1–2 (0–1, 0–0, 1–1)	Italy	Shayba Arena; Attendance: 3,889

Game reference

Yu Man-gyun
Goalies
Gabriele Araudo
Referee:
(Canada) Paul Boese
Linesmen:
(Russia) Dmitriy Klochkov
(Norway) Espen Nyberget

	0–1	09:55 – Macri (Leperdi)
Jung – 35:06	1–1
	1–2	35:53 – Planker (Chiarotti)

2 min
Penalties
4 min
10
Shots
13

5–8 Classification Play-offs

12 March 2014; 20:00	Czech Republic	2–0 (0–0, 1–0, 1–0)	South Korea	Shayba Arena; Attendance: 4,769

Game reference
Michal Vápenka	Goalies	Yu Man-gyun	Referee: (Russia) Igor Samoylov; Linesmen: (Netherlands) Louis Beelen (Norway) Espen Nyberget
Berger (Fojtík, Šafránek) – 18:27 / 1–0; Kvoch (Kubeš) (PP) – 40:04 / 2–0			Referee: (Russia) Igor Samoylov; Linesmen: (Netherlands) Louis Beelen (Norway) Espen Nyberget
10 min	Penalties	20 min	Referee: (Russia) Igor Samoylov; Linesmen: (Netherlands) Louis Beelen (Norway) Espen Nyberget
12	Shots	19	Referee: (Russia) Igor Samoylov; Linesmen: (Netherlands) Louis Beelen (Norway) Espen Nyberget

7th Place Game

14 March 2014; 13:00	South Korea	2–0 (1–0, 1–0, 0–0)	Sweden	Shayba Arena; Attendance: 4,832

Game reference
Yu Man-gyun	Goalies	Ulf Nilsson	Referee: (Czech Republic) Jan Vaněk; Linesmen: (Poland) Tomasz Heltman (Norway) Espen Nyberget
Jang D. (Cho Y., Lee Jo.) (PP) – 10:06 / 1–0; Jung (Cho Y.) – 18:16 / 2–0			Referee: (Czech Republic) Jan Vaněk; Linesmen: (Poland) Tomasz Heltman (Norway) Espen Nyberget
4 min	Penalties	6 min	Referee: (Czech Republic) Jan Vaněk; Linesmen: (Poland) Tomasz Heltman (Norway) Espen Nyberget
28	Shots	6	Referee: (Czech Republic) Jan Vaněk; Linesmen: (Poland) Tomasz Heltman (Norway) Espen Nyberget

== Wheelchair curling ==
Team

Position	Curler
Skip	Kim Myung-jin
Third	Kim Jong-pan
Second	Seo Soon-seok
Lead	Kang Mi-suk
Alternate	Yun Hee-keong

Standings

Final round robin standings
Team	Skip	Pld	W	L	PF	PA	Qualification
Russia	Andrei Smirnov	9	8	1	60	38	Playoffs
Canada	Jim Armstrong	9	7	2	66	42	Playoffs
China	Wang Haitao	9	5	4	54	45	Playoffs
Great Britain	Aileen Neilson	9	5	4	53	56	Playoffs
United States	Patrick McDonald	9	4	5	56	52	
Slovakia	Radoslav Ďuriš	9	4	5	47	68	
Sweden	Jalle Jungnell	9	4	5	59	49	
Norway	Rune Lorentsen	9	3	6	47	62	
South Korea	Kim Myung-jin	9	3	6	41	74	
Finland	Markku Karjalainen	9	2	7	61	58	

Results

Draw 1

Saturday, March 8, 9:30

Sheet B	1	2	3	4	5	6	7	8	Final
South Korea (Kim)	0	0	0	0	0	0	X	X	0
Norway (Lorentsen) 🔨	0	0	2	3	1	4	X	X	10

Draw 2

Saturday, March 8, 15:30

Sheet C	1	2	3	4	5	6	7	8	Final
United States (McDonald) 🔨	0	1	0	3	0	1	0	X	5
South Korea (Kim)	3	0	3	0	2	0	1	X	9

Draw 4

Sunday, March 9, 15:30

Sheet D	1	2	3	4	5	6	7	8	Final
Great Britain (Neilson)	1	1	1	0	0	0	5	X	8
South Korea (Kim) 🔨	0	0	0	2	1	1	0	X	4

Draw 5

Monday, March 10, 9:30

Sheet A	1	2	3	4	5	6	7	8	Final
South Korea (Kim)	1	0	2	0	0	0	2	0	5
Russia (Smirnov) 🔨	0	1	0	1	1	1	0	3	7

Draw 6

Monday, March 10, 15:30

Sheet B	1	2	3	4	5	6	7	8	Final
South Korea (Kim)	1	0	0	1	0	0	0	X	2
China (Wang) 🔨	0	3	1	0	3	1	3	X	11

Draw 7

Tuesday, March 11, 9:30

Sheet D	1	2	3	4	5	6	7	8	Final
South Korea (Kim)	0	0	0	0	2	4	1	X	7
Slovakia (Ďuriš) 🔨	1	1	1	1	0	0	0	X	4

Draw 9

Wednesday, March 12, 9:30

Sheet B	1	2	3	4	5	6	7	8	Final
Canada (Armstrong) 🔨	0	3	2	0	1	0	4	X	10
South Korea (Kim)	1	0	0	1	0	2	0	X	4

Draw 11

Thursday, March 13, 9:30

Sheet A	1	2	3	4	5	6	7	8	Final
Finland (Karjalainen)	2	0	1	0	2	0	1	0	6
South Korea (Kim) 🔨	0	1	0	1	0	3	0	2	7

Draw 12

Thursday, March 13, 15:30

Sheet C	1	2	3	4	5	6	7	8	Final
South Korea (Kim)	0	1	0	0	0	2	0	X	3
Sweden (Jungnell) 🔨	3	0	5	1	2	0	2	X	13

== See also ==
- South Korea at the Paralympics
- South Korea at the 2014 Winter Olympics
