= Sweden at the 2018 Winter Paralympics =

- IPC code: SWE
- NPC: Swedish Parasports Federation

in Pyeongchang
- Competitors: 24 in 5 sports
- Flag bearer: Ronny Persson
- Medals: Gold 0 Silver 1 Bronze 0 Total 1

Winter Paralympics appearances (overview)
- 1976; 1980; 1984; 1988; 1992; 1994; 1998; 2002; 2006; 2010; 2014; 2018; 2022; 2026

Sweden will compete at the 2018 Winter Paralympics in Pyeongchang, South Korea, held between 9–18 March 2018. They sent a team of 21 participants in 5 sports.

== Medalists ==
Medal	Name	Sport	Event	Date
Silver	Zebastian Modin; Guide: Robin Bryntesson	Cross-country skiing	Men's 1.5 km sprint visually impaired	14 March

== Competitors ==
The following is the list of number of competitors participating at the Games per sport.

Sport	Men	Women	Total
Alpine skiing	1	0	1
Biathlon	1	0	1 (Note: Zebastian Modin will take part in two sports; biathlon and cross-country skiing.)
Cross-country skiing	1	0	1
Ice sledge hockey	17	0	17
Wheelchair curling	3	2	5
Total	22	2	24

== Alpine skiing ==
Men

Athlete	Event	Run 1		Run 2		Total	
Athlete	Event	Time	Rank	Time	Rank	Time	Rank
Aaron Lindström	Slalom standing	51.72	10	51.23	5	1:42.95	7
Aaron Lindström	Giant slalom standing	1:12.19	20	1:12.97	18	2:25.16	16
Aaron Lindström	Super-G standing	—N/a				1:31.77	18

== Biathlon ==
Men

Athlete	Event	Time	Misses	Rank
Zebastian Modin; Guide: Johannes Andersson	7.5 km visually impaired	21:59.3	5 (4+1)	7

== Cross-country skiing ==
Men's distance

Athlete	Event	Final	
Athlete	Event	Time	Rank
Zebastian Modin; Guide: Johannes Andersson	10 km classical visually impaired	did not finish	
Zebastian Modin; Guide: Johannes Andersson	20 km free visually impaired	47:28.9	4

Sprint

Athlete	Event	Qualification		Quarterfinal		Semifinal		Final	
Athlete	Event	Time	Rank	Time	Rank	Time	Rank	Time	Rank
Zebastian Modin; Guide: Robin Bryntesson	1.5 km sprint visually impaired	3:27.96	1 Q	—N/a		4:21.4	1 Q	4:05.7	2nd place, silver medalist(s)

== Para ice hockey ==
Summary

Key:

- OT – Overtime
- GWS – Match decided by penalty-shootout

Team	Group stage				Semifinal / Pl.	Final / BM / Pl.	
Team	Opposition Score	Opposition Score	Opposition Score	Rank	Opposition Score	Opposition Score	Rank
Sweden men's	Canada; L 0–17	Italy; L 0–2	Norway; L 1–3	4	Czech Republic; L 3–4 GWS	Japan; W 5–1	7

Roster: Daniel Cederstam, Maximillian Gyllsten, Christian Hedberg, Marcus Holm, Kenth Jonsson, Göran Karlsson, Per Kasperi, Niklas Ingvarsson, Rasmus Lundgren, Martin Magnevill, Robin Meng, Andreas Nejman, Peter Nilsson, Ulf Nilsson, Peter Ojala, Niklas Rakos, Anders Wistrand

Preliminary round

Pos	Team	Pld	W	OTW	OTL	L	GF	GA	GD	Pts	Qualification
1	Canada	3	3	0	0	0	35	0	+35	9	Semifinals
2	Italy	3	1	1	0	1	5	12	−7	5	Semifinals
3	Norway	3	1	0	1	1	5	12	−7	4	5–8th place semifinals
4	Sweden	3	0	0	0	3	1	22	−21	0	5–8th place semifinals

Source: PyeongChang 2018

10 March 2018; 19:00	Canada	17–0 (7–0, 5–0, 5–0)	Sweden	Gangneung Hockey Centre; Attendance: 5,445

Game reference

Corbin Watson
Dominic Larocque
Goalies
Ulf Nilsson
Andreas Nejman
Referee:
(Austria) Kristijan Nikolic
Linesmen:
(South Korea) Han Youl
(Czech Republic) Jan Vaněk

McGregor (Hickey, Dixon) (PP) – 01:52	1–0
Sholomicki (Armstrong, Dunn) – 02:22	2–0
McGregor (Westlake, Hickey) – 05:22	3–0
Sholomicki (Dunn, Dixon) – 05:39	4–0
McGregor (Westlake, Dixon) – 09:20	5–0
Dixon (Delaney, Smith) – 11:13	6–0
Cozzolino (Delaney, Dixon) – 11:31	7–0
Delaney (Armstrong, Cozzolino) (PP) – 17:43	8–0
Smith (Sholomicki, Dunn) – 18:06	9–0
Hickey (Armstrong, Henry) – 24:37	10–0
Hickey (Westlake, McGregor) – 25:37	11–0
Armstrong (Sholomicki) – 26:38	12–0
Bridges – 31:55	13–0
Armstrong (Bridges, Cozzolino) – 33:05	14–0
Sholomicki (Smith, Dunn) – 34:53	15–0
McGregor (Dixon) – 36:48	16–0
Westlake (McGregor, Hickey) – 44:42	17–0

2 min
Penalties
6 min
45
Shots
2

12 March 2018; 19:00	Italy	2–0 (1–0, 0–0, 1–0)	Sweden	Gangneung Hockey Centre; Attendance: 4,322

Game reference
Gabriele Araudo	Goalies	Ulf Nilsson	Referee: (Japan) Sotaro Yamaguchi; Linesmen: (Czech Republic) Jan Vaněk (Czech Republic) Leon Wesley
Kalegaris (Planker, Rosa) (PP) – 13:16 / 1–0; Rosa – 39:36 / 2–0			Referee: (Japan) Sotaro Yamaguchi; Linesmen: (Czech Republic) Jan Vaněk (Czech Republic) Leon Wesley
10 min	Penalties	8 min	Referee: (Japan) Sotaro Yamaguchi; Linesmen: (Czech Republic) Jan Vaněk (Czech Republic) Leon Wesley
20	Shots	2	Referee: (Japan) Sotaro Yamaguchi; Linesmen: (Czech Republic) Jan Vaněk (Czech Republic) Leon Wesley

13 March 2018; 15:30	Norway	3–1 (1–0, 1–0, 1–1)	Sweden	Gangneung Hockey Centre; Attendance: 6,059

Game reference

Kissinger Deng
Goalies
Ulf Nilsson
Referee:
(Japan) Sotaro Yamaguchi
Linesmen:
(South Korea) Chae Young-jin
(Czech Republic) Jan Vaněk

Nordstoga (Bøgle) – 13:07	1–0
Bøgle (Hamre, Solberg) (PP) – 25:00	2–0
	2–1	31:35 – Gyllsten (Kasperi, P. Nilsson)
Bøgle (Værnes) (ENG) – 43:45	3–1

4 min
Penalties
16 min
19
Shots
10

5–8th place semifinal

14 March 2018; 16:00	Czech Republic	4–3 GWS (1–2, 0–1, 2–0) (OT: 0–0) (SO: 1–0)	Sweden	Gangneung Hockey Centre; Attendance: 6,032

Game reference

Michal Vápenka
Goalies
Ulf Nilsson
Referee:
(Norway) Owe Lüthcke
Linesmen:
(Canada) Matthew Fergenbaum
(South Korea) Han Youl

	0–1	06:14 – Ingvarsson
	0–2	07:10 – Kasperi
Krupička (PP) – 08:59	1–2
	1–3	16:12 – Ingvarsson (Gyllsten, Kasperi)
Hábl (Kubeš, Geier) (PP2) – 34:47	2–3
Doležal (Geier, Kubeš) – 43:25	3–3

Geier
Krupička
Hábl (miss)
Geier
Shootout
(miss) Kasperi
Gyllsten
Ingvarsson
(miss) Ingvarsson
8 min
Penalties
10 min
25
Shots
8

Seventh place game

16 March 2018; 16:00	Japan	1–5 (0–1, 1–2, 0–2)	Sweden	Gangneung Hockey Centre; Attendance: 5,979

Game reference

Shinobu Fukushima
Goalies
Ulf Nilsson
Referee:
(Norway) Owe Lüthcke
Linesmen:
(Czech Republic) Jan Vaněk
(Czech Republic) Leon Wesley

	0–1	00:52 – Gyllsten (Kasperi, Meng)
Takahashi (Uehara) – 16:25	1–1
	1–2	19:19 – Ingvarsson (Meng, Kasperi) (PP)
	1–3	27:33 – Kasperi (Hedberg) (SH)
	1–4	37:24 – Holm (Rakos, Kasperi)
	1–5	44:17 – Ingvarsson (Gyllsten, P. Nilsson)

4 min
Penalties
4 min
10
Shots
14

== Wheelchair curling ==
Summary

Team	Event	Group stage												Tiebreaker	Semifinal	Final / BM	
Team	Event	Opposition Score	Opposition Score	Opposition Score	Opposition Score	Opposition Score	Opposition Score	Opposition Score	Opposition Score	Opposition Score	Opposition Score	Opposition Score	Rank	Opposition Score	Opposition Score	Opposition Score	Rank
Viljo Petersson Dahl; Ronny Persson; Mats-Ola Engborg; Kristina Ulander; Zandra Reppe	Mixed	(China) CHN; L 4–9	(Canada) CAN; L 4–8	(United States) USA; L 2–10	(Slovakia) SVK; L 3–8	(United Kingdom) GBR; L 1–6	(Norway) NOR; W 5–4	(Germany) GER; W 9–5	(Finland) FIN; L 5–6	(South Korea) KOR; L 2–4	(International Paralympic Committee) NPA; W 7–3	(Switzerland) SUI; W 5–3	10	did not advance			

Pos	Team	Pld	W	L	PF	PA	PD	PCT	Ends Won	Ends Lost	Blank Ends	Stolen Ends	Shot %	Qualification
1	South Korea	11	9	2	65	51	14	0.818	38	36	9	11	66%	Advance to playoffs
2	Canada	11	9	2	74	45	29	0.818	47	28	6	27	62%	Advance to playoffs
3	China	11	9	2	85	42	43	0.818	43	32	2	16	67%	Advance to playoffs
4	Norway	11	7	4	55	57	−2	0.636	41	35	5	15	58%	Advance to playoffs
5	Neutral Paralympic Athletes	11	5	6	61	63	−2	0.455	44	37	2	23	62%	
6	Switzerland	11	5	6	56	63	−7	0.455	36	45	2	11	61%	
7	Great Britain	11	5	6	57	53	4	0.455	41	41	6	20	62%	
8	Germany	11	5	6	57	68	−11	0.455	37	39	5	16	54%	
9	Slovakia	11	4	7	62	72	−10	0.364	39	46	1	11	57%	
10	Sweden	11	4	7	47	66	−19	0.364	29	45	8	8	57%	
11	Finland	11	2	9	53	87	−34	0.182	35	46	1	11	51%	
12	United States	11	2	9	58	63	−5	0.182	37	45	3	12	60%	

Source: Paralympic.org

Round-robin

Sweden has a bye in draws 1, 3, 8, 11, 13 and 15.

Draw 2

Saturday, 10 March, 19:35

Sheet A	1	2	3	4	5	6	7	8	Final
Sweden (Petersson Dahl)	0	0	1	0	1	0	2	X	4
China (Wang) 🔨	1	3	0	1	0	4	0	X	9

Draw 4

Sunday, 11 March, 14:35

Sheet C	1	2	3	4	5	6	7	8	Final
Canada (Ideson) 🔨	0	0	4	1	1	0	0	2	8
Sweden (Petersson Dahl)	1	3	0	0	0	0	0	0	4

Draw 5

Sunday, 11 March, 19:35

Sheet D	1	2	3	4	5	6	7	8	Final
United States (Black) 🔨	2	2	1	1	0	2	2	X	10
Sweden (Petersson Dahl)	0	0	0	0	2	0	0	X	2

Draw 6

Monday, 12 March, 09:35

Sheet B	1	2	3	4	5	6	7	8	Final
Sweden (Petersson Dahl)	0	1	0	0	2	0	0	X	3
Slovakia (Ďuriš) 🔨	3	0	2	1	0	1	1	X	8

Draw 7

Monday, 12 March, 14:35

Sheet D	1	2	3	4	5	6	7	8	Final
Sweden (Petersson Dahl)	0	0	0	0	0	0	1	X	1
Great Britain (Neilson) 🔨	2	1	1	1	1	0	0	X	6

Draw 9

Tuesday, 13 March, 09:35

Sheet B	1	2	3	4	5	6	7	8	Final
Norway (Stordahl)	1	0	1	0	1	0	1	0	4
Sweden (Petersson Dahl) 🔨	0	3	0	1	0	1	0	0	5

Draw 10

Tuesday, 13 March, 14:35

Sheet C	1	2	3	4	5	6	7	8	Final
Sweden (Petersson Dahl) 🔨	1	3	2	2	0	0	1	0	9
Germany (Putzich)	0	0	0	0	3	1	1	0	5

Draw 12

Wednesday, 14 March, 9:35

Sheet A	1	2	3	4	5	6	7	8	Final
Finland (S. Karjalainen) 🔨	2	0	1	2	0	0	1	0	6
Sweden (Petersson Dahl)	0	1	0	0	2	1	0	1	5

Draw 14

Wednesday, 14 March, 19:35

Sheet C	1	2	3	4	5	6	7	8	Final
South Korea (Seo)	1	1	0	1	0	0	1	X	4
Sweden (Petersson Dahl) 🔨	0	0	1	0	1	0	0	X	2

Draw 16

Thursday, 15 March, 14:35

Sheet D	1	2	3	4	5	6	7	8	Final
Neutral Paralympic Athletes (Kurokhtin) 🔨	1	0	0	0	0	1	1	X	3
Sweden (Petersson Dahl)	0	0	2	3	2	0	0	X	7

Draw 17

Thursday, 15 March, 19:35

Sheet A	1	2	3	4	5	6	7	8	Final
Sweden (Petersson Dahl) 🔨	0	1	0	0	0	1	0	3	5
Switzerland (Wagner)	0	0	1	0	1	0	1	0	3

== See also ==
- Sweden at the 2018 Winter Olympics
