= Ice hockey at the 2018 Winter Paralympics =

2018 Winter Paralympics

Tournament details
- Host country: South Korea
- Venue: Gangneung Hockey Centre
- Dates: 10–18 March 2018
- Teams: 8

Final positions
- Champions: United States (4th title)
- Runners-up: Canada
- Third place: South Korea
- Fourth place: Italy

Tournament statistics
- Games played: 20
- Goals scored: 136 (6.8 per game)
- Attendance: 110,417 (5,521 per game)
- Scoring leader: (United States) Declan Farmer (17 points)

The Para ice hockey competition of the 2018 Winter Paralympics was held at Gangneung Hockey Centre, South Korea, from 10 to 18 March 2018. A total of eight teams competed in the mixed team tournament. Lena Schrøder from Norway has become the second female Para ice hockey player at the Paralympic Games after Britt Mjaasund Øyen.

== Medalists ==
Event	Gold	Silver	Bronze
Mixed	United States (USA)	Canada (CAN)	South Korea (KOR)
Mixed	~~Tyler Carron~~; Steve Cash; Ralph DeQuebec; Travis Dodson; Declan Farmer; Noah Grove; Billy Hanning Jr. Nikko Landeros; Jen Lee; Luke McDermott; Kevin McKee; Josh Misiewicz; Adam Page; Josh Pauls; Rico Roman; Brody Roybal; Jack Wallace	Rob Armstrong; Steve Arsenault; Bradley Bowden; Billy Bridges; Dominic Cozzolino; Ben Delaney; Adam Dixon; James Dunn; James Gemmell; Tyrone Henry; Liam Hickey; Dominic Larocque; Tyler McGregor; Bryan Sholomicki; Corbyn Smith; Corbin Watson; Greg Westlake	Cho Byeong-seok; Cho Young-jae; Choi Kwang-hyouk; Choi Si-woo; Han Min-su; Jang Dong-shin; Jang Jong-ho; Jung Seung-hwan; Kim Dea-jung; Kim Young-sung; Lee Hae-man; Lee Jae-woong; Lee Ji-hoon; Lee Jong-kyung; Lee Ju-seung; Lee Yong-min; Yu Man-gyun

== Qualification ==
Qualifying event	Date	Venue	Vacancies	Qualified
Host nation	6 July 2011	(South Africa) Durban	1	South Korea
2017 World Championships	12–20 April 2017	(South Korea) Gangneung	4	Canada; United States; Norway; Italy
Paralympic Qualification Tournament	9–14 October 2017	(Sweden) Östersund	3	Czech Republic; Japan; Sweden

== Match officials ==
5 referees and 8 linesmen were selected for the tournament.

Referees

- (Austria) Kristijan Nikolic
- (Canada) Kevin Webinger
- (Japan) Sotaro Yamaguchi
- (Norway) Owe Lüthcke
- (United States) Johnathan Morrison

Linesmen

- (Austria) David Nothegger
- (Canada) Matt Clark
- (Canada) Matthew Fergenbaum
- (Czech Republic) Jan Vaněk
- (Czech Republic) Leon Wesley
- (South Korea) Chae Young-jin
- (South Korea) Han Youl
- (Sweden) Andreas Lundén

== Preliminary round ==
All times are local (UTC+9).

=== Group A ===
Pos	Team	Pld	W	OTW	OTL	L	GF	GA	GD	Pts	Qualification
1	Canada	3	3	0	0	0	35	0	+35	9	Semifinals
2	Italy	3	1	1	0	1	5	12	−7	5	Semifinals
3	Norway	3	1	0	1	1	5	12	−7	4	5–8th place semifinals
4	Sweden	3	0	0	0	3	1	22	−21	0	5–8th place semifinals

Source: PyeongChang 2018

10 March 2018; 12:00	Norway	2–3 GWS (0–0, 1–1, 1–1) (OT 0–0) (SO: 0–1)	Italy	Gangneung Hockey Centre; Attendance: 5,543

Game reference

Kjell Christian Hamar
Goalies
Gabriele Araudo
Referee:
(Canada) Kevin Webinger
Linesmen:
(South Korea) Chae Young-jin
(Austria) David Nothegger

	0–1	16:02 – Kalegaris (Leperdi)
Værnes (Nordstoga, Hamre) (PP) – 26:32	1–1
	1–2	33:19 – Rosa (Larch)
Bakke (Nordstoga, Pedersen) – 42:25	2–2

Solberg (miss)
Vatne (miss)
Pedersen (miss)
Shootout
Larch
(miss) Rosa
6 min
Penalties
4 min
12
Shots
18

10 March 2018; 19:00	Canada	17–0 (7–0, 5–0, 5–0)	Sweden	Gangneung Hockey Centre; Attendance: 5,445

Game reference

Corbin Watson
Dominic Larocque
Goalies
Ulf Nilsson
Andreas Nejman
Referee:
(Austria) Kristijan Nikolic
Linesmen:
(South Korea) Han Youl
(Czech Republic) Jan Vaněk

McGregor (Hickey, Dixon) (PP) – 01:52	1–0
Sholomicki (Armstrong, Dunn) – 02:22	2–0
McGregor (Westlake, Hickey) – 05:22	3–0
Sholomicki (Dunn, Dixon) – 05:39	4–0
McGregor (Westlake, Dixon) – 09:20	5–0
Dixon (Delaney, Smith) – 11:13	6–0
Cozzolino (Delaney, Dixon) – 11:31	7–0
Delaney (Armstrong, Cozzolino) (PP) – 17:43	8–0
Smith (Sholomicki, Dunn) – 18:06	9–0
Hickey (Armstrong, Henry) – 24:37	10–0
Hickey (Westlake, McGregor) – 25:37	11–0
Armstrong (Sholomicki) – 26:38	12–0
Bridges – 31:55	13–0
Armstrong (Bridges, Cozzolino) – 33:05	14–0
Sholomicki (Smith, Dunn) – 34:53	15–0
McGregor (Dixon) – 36:48	16–0
Westlake (McGregor, Hickey) – 44:42	17–0

2 min
Penalties
6 min
45
Shots
2

11 March 2018; 19:00	Canada	10–0 (3–0, 4–0, 3–0)	Italy	Gangneung Hockey Centre; Attendance: 4,795

Game reference

Corbin Watson
Goalies
Santino Stillitano
Referee:
(Japan) Sotaro Yamaguchi
Linesmen:
(Austria) David Nothegger
(Czech Republic) Leon Wesley

McGregor (Dixon, Westlake) (PP) – 03:59	1–0
Dixon (Sholomicki) – 09:21	2–0
Delaney (Cozzolino, Armstrong) – 11:36	3–0
Hickey (Bridges, Delaney) – 17:03	4–0
Hickey – 19:11	5–0
Delaney (Sholomicki) (SH) – 20:20	6–0
Delaney (Sholomicki) (SH) – 25:34	7–0
Cozzolino (Bridges) – 33:06	8–0
Dunn (SH) – 36:27	9–0
Dunn – 41:23	10–0

24 min
Penalties
6 min
16
Shots
4

12 March 2018; 15:30	Canada	8–0 (2–0, 3–0, 3–0)	Norway	Gangneung Hockey Centre; Attendance: 5,886

Game reference

Dominic Larocque
Goalies
Kjell Christian Hamar
Referee:
(Austria) Kristijan Nikolic
Linesmen:
(South Korea) Chae Young-jin
(Sweden) Andreas Lundén

Bridges (Dixon, Arsenault) – 02:33	1–0
Armstrong (Cozzolino, Bowden) – 08:47	2–0
Hickey (PP) – 26:50	3–0
Bowden (Armstrong) – 27:54	4–0
Armstrong (Dunn) – 28:49	5–0
Bridges (Hickey, Arsenault) – 33:59	6–0
Westlake (McGregor) (PP) – 37:21	7–0
McGregor (Cozzolino) (SH) – 41:51	8–0

8 min
Penalties
8 min
27
Shots
5

12 March 2018; 19:00	Italy	2–0 (1–0, 0–0, 1–0)	Sweden	Gangneung Hockey Centre; Attendance: 4,322

Game reference
Gabriele Araudo	Goalies	Ulf Nilsson	Referee: (Japan) Sotaro Yamaguchi; Linesmen: (Czech Republic) Jan Vaněk (Czech Republic) Leon Wesley
Kalegaris (Planker, Rosa) (PP) – 13:16 / 1–0; Rosa – 39:36 / 2–0			Referee: (Japan) Sotaro Yamaguchi; Linesmen: (Czech Republic) Jan Vaněk (Czech Republic) Leon Wesley
10 min	Penalties	8 min	Referee: (Japan) Sotaro Yamaguchi; Linesmen: (Czech Republic) Jan Vaněk (Czech Republic) Leon Wesley
20	Shots	2	Referee: (Japan) Sotaro Yamaguchi; Linesmen: (Czech Republic) Jan Vaněk (Czech Republic) Leon Wesley

13 March 2018; 15:30	Norway	3–1 (1–0, 1–0, 1–1)	Sweden	Gangneung Hockey Centre; Attendance: 6,059

Game reference

Kissinger Deng
Goalies
Ulf Nilsson
Referee:
(Japan) Sotaro Yamaguchi
Linesmen:
(South Korea) Chae Young-jin
(Czech Republic) Jan Vaněk

Nordstoga (Bøgle) – 13:07	1–0
Bøgle (Hamre, Solberg) (PP) – 25:00	2–0
	2–1	31:35 – Gyllsten (Kasperi, P. Nilsson)
Bøgle (Værnes) (ENG) – 43:45	3–1

4 min
Penalties
16 min
19
Shots
10

=== Group B ===
Pos	Team	Pld	W	OTW	OTL	L	GF	GA	GD	Pts	Qualification
1	United States	3	3	0	0	0	28	0	+28	9	Semifinals
2	South Korea (H)	3	1	1	0	1	7	11	−4	5	Semifinals
3	Czech Republic	3	1	0	1	1	5	13	−8	4	5–8th place semifinals
4	Japan	3	0	0	0	3	1	17	−16	0	5–8th place semifinals

Source: PyeongChang 2018
(H) Host

10 March 2018; 15:30	South Korea	4–1 (0–0, 1–0, 3–1)	Japan	Gangneung Hockey Centre; Attendance: 6,022

Game reference

Yu Man-gyun
Goalies
Shinobu Fukushima
Referee:
(Norway) Owe Lüthcke
Linesmen:
(Canada) Matt Clark
(Czech Republic) Leon Wesley

Jang D. (Kim Y., Jang J.) (PP) – 21:08	1–0
Jung – 30:51	2–0
Cho Y. (Cho B., Jung) – 35:56	3–0
Lee H. (Jang D., Lee Ji.) (PP) – 40:31	4–0
	4–1	42:53 – Takahashi (Uehara, Kumagai) (PP)

12 min
Penalties
14 min
24
Shots
7

11 March 2018; 12:00	United States	10–0 (3–0, 6–0, 1–0)	Japan	Gangneung Hockey Centre; Attendance: 5,435

Game reference

Jen Lee
Goalies
Shinobu Fukushima
Kazuya Mochizuki
Referee:
(Austria) Kristijan Nikolic
Linesmen:
(Canada) Matt Clark
(South Korea) Han Youl

McKee (Landeros) – 01:01	1–0
Roybal (Misiewicz) – 04:34	2–0
Grove (Farmer, DeQuebec) – 12:26	3–0
Landeros (Roybal, Farmer) (PP) – 20:25	4–0
Farmer – 20:55	5–0
McDermott (Page, DeQuebec) – 23:20	6–0
Roman (Page, Pauls) – 23:54	7–0
Roybal (Misiewicz) – 24:02	8–0
Roybal (McKee, Misiewicz) – 24:49	9–0
Wallace (Farmer, Pauls) – 38:25	10–0

2 min
Penalties
4 min
24
Shots
2

11 March 2018; 15:30	South Korea	3–2 OT (0–0, 1–0, 1–2) (OT: 1–0)	Czech Republic	Gangneung Hockey Centre; Attendance: 5,187

Game reference

Yu Man-gyun
Goalies
Michal Vápenka
Referee:
(United States) Jonathan Morrison
Linesmen:
(Canada) Matthew Fergenbaum
(Sweden) Andreas Lundén

Lee Ju. (Jang J., Jung) – 18:28	1–0
	1–1	38:55 – Geier (Kubeš) (SH)
Jung (Lee Jo.) – 42:53	2–1
	2–2	44:21 – Geier (Kubeš, Doležal) (EA)
Jung (Jang D., Cho Y.) – 45:13	3–2

8 min
Penalties
8 min
22
Shots
10

12 March 2018; 12:00	United States	10–0 (3–0, 7–0, 0–0)	Czech Republic	Gangneung Hockey Centre; Attendance: 5,709

Game reference

Steve Cash
Goalies
Martin Kuděla
Referee:
(Norway) Owe Lüthcke
Linesmen:
(Canada) Matthew Fergenbaum
(Austria) David Nothegger

Roybal (Landeros) – 01:04	1–0
Farmer (Wallace, Page) – 08:17	2–0
Farmer (McKee, Pauls) (PP) – 12:05	3–0
Farmer (Page, Wallace) (PP) – 18:39	4–0
Wallace (Farmer, Page) – 21:45	5–0
Roybal (Misiewicz, McKee) – 24:46	6–0
Dodson (Hanning) – 27:21	7–0
Farmer (Landeros, Carron) (PP) – 28:22	8–0
Roybal (Misiewicz) – 28:47	9–0
Dodson (Landeros) – 29:42	10–0

4 min
Penalties
8 min
31
Shots
13

13 March 2018; 12:00	United States	8–0 (6–0, 0–0, 2–0)	South Korea	Gangneung Hockey Centre; Attendance: 6,588

Game reference

Steve Cash
Goalies
Yu Man-gyun
Lee Jae-woong
Referee:
(Canada) Kevin Webinger
Linesmen:
(Canada) Matt Clark
(Canada) Matthew Fergenbaum

Roybal (Farmer, Landeros) (PP) – 04:51	1–0
Farmer (Wallace, DeQuebec) – 06:40	2–0
Misiewicz (Pauls, Landeros) (PP) – 08:09	3–0
Misiewicz (McKee, Roybal) – 09:57	4–0
Farmer (Roybal) (SH) – 12:27	5–0
Farmer (Roybal, Carron) (SH)– 13:37	6–0
Dodson (Carron, Roman) – 33:36	7–0
Roybal (McKee) – 40:07	8–0

8 min
Penalties
12 min
24
Shots
4

13 March 2018; 19:00	Czech Republic	3–0 (0–0, 1–0, 2–0)	Japan	Gangneung Hockey Centre; Attendance: 4,569

Game reference

Michal Vápenka
Goalies
Shinobu Fukushima
Referee:
(United States) Jonathan Morrison
Linesmen:
(South Korea) Han Youl
(Sweden) Andreas Lundén

Kubeš (Hábl) – 27:26	1–0
Šafránek (Hrbek, Krupička) – 33:11	2–0
Kubeš (ENG) – 44:42	3–0

4 min
Penalties
4 min
11
Shots
5

== Classification round ==
=== Bracket ===
5–8th place semifinals
14 March
Norway	6
Japan	1
14 March
Czech Republic (GWS)	4
Sweden	3

Fifth place game
16 March
Norway	5
Czech Republic	2
Seventh place game
16 March
Japan	1
Sweden	5

=== 5–8th place semifinals ===
14 March 2018; 16:00	Czech Republic	4–3 GWS (1–2, 0–1, 2–0) (OT: 0–0) (SO: 1–0)	Sweden	Gangneung Hockey Centre; Attendance: 6,032

Game reference

Michal Vápenka
Goalies
Ulf Nilsson
Referee:
(Norway) Owe Lüthcke
Linesmen:
(Canada) Matthew Fergenbaum
(South Korea) Han Youl

	0–1	06:14 – Ingvarsson
	0–2	07:10 – Kasperi
Krupička (PP) – 08:59	1–2
	1–3	16:12 – Ingvarsson (Gyllsten, Kasperi)
Hábl (Kubeš, Geier) (PP2) – 34:47	2–3
Doležal (Geier, Kubeš) – 43:25	3–3

Geier
Krupička
Hábl (miss)
Geier
Shootout
(miss) Kasperi
Gyllsten
Ingvarsson
(miss) Ingvarsson
8 min
Penalties
10 min
25
Shots
8

14 March 2018; 20:00	Norway	6–1 (2–0, 3–1, 1–0)	Japan	Gangneung Hockey Centre; Attendance: 3,919

Game reference

Kjell Christian Hamar
Goalies
Shinobu Fukushima
Kazuya Mochizuki
Referee:
(Canada) Johnathan Morrison
Linesmen:
(Czech Republic) Jan Vaněk
(Czech Republic) Leon Wesley

Bakke (Øiseth) (PP) – 02:25	1–0
Pedersen (Bøgle, Nordstoga) – 09:37	2–0
	2–1	18:20 – Takahashi (Horie) (SH)
Bøgle – 18:34	3–1
Pedersen (Hamre) – 18:55	4–1
Bakke (Værnes, Bøgle) – 20:02	5–1
Pedersen (Bøgle, Nordstoga) – 35:28	6–1

0 min
Penalties
4 min
14
Shots
6

=== Seventh place game ===
16 March 2018; 16:00	Japan	1–5 (0–1, 1–2, 0–2)	Sweden	Gangneung Hockey Centre; Attendance: 5,979

Game reference

Shinobu Fukushima
Goalies
Ulf Nilsson
Referee:
(Norway) Owe Lüthcke
Linesmen:
(Czech Republic) Jan Vaněk
(Czech Republic) Leon Wesley

	0–1	00:52 – Gyllsten (Kasperi, Meng)
Takahashi (Uehara) – 16:25	1–1
	1–2	19:19 – Ingvarsson (Meng, Kasperi) (PP)
	1–3	27:33 – Kasperi (Hedberg) (SH)
	1–4	37:24 – Holm (Rakos, Kasperi)
	1–5	44:17 – Ingvarsson (Gyllsten, P. Nilsson)

4 min
Penalties
4 min
10
Shots
14

=== Fifth place game ===
16 March 2018; 20:00	Norway	5–2 (2–1, 1–0, 2–1)	Czech Republic	Gangneung Hockey Centre; Attendance: 4,805

Game reference

Kjell Christian Hamar
Goalies
Martin Kudela
Referee:
(Canada) Kevin Webinger
Linesmen:
(South Korea) Chae Young-jin
(South Korea) Han Youl

Pedersen (Bøgle) – 00:44	1–0
Bakke (Værnes) – 03:39	2–0
	2–1	14:18 – Krupička (Motyčka)
Pedersen (PP) – 23:44	3–1
	3–2	35:29 – Kubeš (Hábl, Geier) (PP)
Bakke (Værnes, Pedersen) – 40:05	4–2
Bakke (SH, ENG) – 42:03	5–2

10 min
Penalties
31 min
12
Shots
9

== Medal round ==
=== Bracket ===
Semifinals
15 March
Canada	7
South Korea	0
15 March
United States	10
Italy	1

Gold medal game
18 March
Canada	1
United States (OT)	2
Bronze medal game
17 March
South Korea	1
Italy	0

=== Semifinals ===
15 March 2018; 12:00	Canada	7–0 (4–0, 1–0, 2–0)	South Korea	Gangneung Hockey Centre; Attendance: 6,603

Game reference

Corbin Watson
Dominic Larocque
Goalies
Lee Jae-woong
Referee:
(Austria) Kristijan Nikolic
Linesmen:
(Sweden) Andreas Lundén
(Austria) David Nothegger

Hickey (Bridges) – 04:17	1–0
Cozzolino – 06:00	2–0
Westlake (Cozzolino, McGregor) – 13:25	3–0
Bridges (Delaney, Armstrong) – 14:19	4–0
Bridges (McGregor, Dixon) (PP) – 18:42	5–0
McGregor (Westlake) – 35:48	6–0
McGregor (Armstrong, Cozzolino) – 42:41	7–0

8 min
Penalties
2 min
24
Shots
2

15 March 2018; 20:00	United States	10–1 (5–0, 3–0, 2–1)	Italy	Gangneung Hockey Centre; Attendance: 4,889

Game reference

Steve Cash
Jen Lee
Goalies
Gabriele Araudo
Santino Stillitano
Referee:
(Canada) Kevin Webinger
Linesmen:
(South Korea) Chae Young-jin
(Canada) Matt Clark

Grove (Landeros) – 03:23	1–0
Misiewicz (Pauls, Roybal) – 03:58	2–0
Roybal (Pauls, Misiewicz) – 04:09	3–0
Landeros (PP) – 13:50	4–0
McDermott (Grove) – 14:56	5–0
Roybal (Misiewicz) (PP) – 22:52	6–0
Landeros (Carron, Farmer) – 23:35	7–0
Farmer (Page, Pauls) – 27:44	8–0
McKee (Grove, Page) – 33:32	9–0
	9–1	38:30 – Corvino (Depaoli) (PP)
Landeros (Roybal, Hanning) (PP) – 42:03	10–1

16 min
Penalties
14 min
33
Shots
4

=== Bronze medal game ===
17 March 2018; 12:00	South Korea	1–0 (0–0, 0–0, 1–0)	Italy	Gangneung Hockey Centre; Attendance: 6,534

Game reference
Lee Jae-woong	Goalies	Gabriele Araudo	Referee: (United States) Johnathan Morrison; Linesmen: (Canada) Matt Clark (Canada) Matthew Fergenbaum
Jang D. (Jung, Lee Jo.) – 41:42 / 1–0			Referee: (United States) Johnathan Morrison; Linesmen: (Canada) Matt Clark (Canada) Matthew Fergenbaum
2 min	Penalties	2 min	Referee: (United States) Johnathan Morrison; Linesmen: (Canada) Matt Clark (Canada) Matthew Fergenbaum
14	Shots	9	Referee: (United States) Johnathan Morrison; Linesmen: (Canada) Matt Clark (Canada) Matthew Fergenbaum

=== Gold medal game ===
18 March 2018; 12:00	Canada	1–2 OT (1–0, 0–0, 0–1) (OT: 0–1)	United States	Gangneung Hockey Centre; Attendance: 6,096

Game reference

Dominic Larocque
Goalies
Steve Cash
Referee:
(Austria) Kristijan Nikolic
Linesmen:
(Sweden) Andreas Lundén
(Austria) David Nothegger

Bridges (Delaney, Hickey) – 12:06	1–0
	1–1	44:22 – Farmer (McKee, Roybal) (EA)
	1–2	48:30 – Farmer (Pauls)

4 min
Penalties
2 min
12
Shots
16

== Final ranking ==
Pos	Grp	Team	Pld	W	OTW	OTL	L	GF	GA	GD	Pts
1st place, gold medalist(s)	B	United States	5	4	1	0	0	40	2	+38	14
2nd place, silver medalist(s)	A	Canada	5	4	0	1	0	43	2	+41	13
3rd place, bronze medalist(s)	B	South Korea (H)	5	2	1	0	2	8	18	−10	8
4	A	Italy	5	1	1	0	3	6	23	−17	5
5	A	Norway	5	3	0	1	1	16	15	+1	10
6	B	Czech Republic	5	1	1	1	2	11	21	−10	6
7	A	Sweden	5	1	0	1	3	9	27	−18	4
8	B	Japan	5	0	0	0	5	3	28	−25	0

Source: PyeongChang 2018
(H) Host

== Statistics ==
=== Scoring leaders ===
List shows the top ten skaters sorted by points, then goals.

Player	GP	G	A	Pts	+/−	PIM	POS
(United States) Declan Farmer	5	11	6	17	+11	0	F
(United States) Brody Roybal	5	10	7	17	+15	0	F
(Canada) Tyler McGregor	5	8	5	13	+11	14	F
(Canada) Liam Hickey	5	6	5	11	+12	0	F
(United States) Nikko Landeros	4	4	7	11	+14	2	D
(Canada) Rob Armstrong	5	4	7	11	+17	0	D
(Canada) Billy Bridges	5	6	4	10	+12	4	F
(Canada) Dom Cozzolino	5	3	7	10	+15	2	F
(United States) Josh Misiewicz	5	3	7	10	+12	4	F
(Canada) Adam Dixon	5	2	8	10	+18	2	D

GP = Games played; G = Goals; A = Assists; Pts = Points; +/− = Plus/minus; PIM = Penalties in minutes; POS = Position
Source: PyeongChang 2018

=== Leading goaltenders ===
Only the top five goaltenders, based on save percentage, who have played at least 40% of their team's minutes, are included in this list.

Player	TOI	GA	GAA	SA	Sv%	SO
(Canada) Corbin Watson	97:43	0	0.00	6	100.00	1
(United States) Steve Cash	152:44	1	0.29	31	96.77	2
(Canada) Dominic Larocque	130:47	2	0.69	23	91.30	1
(Czech Republic) Michal Vápenka	144:56	6	1.86	35	82.86	1
(Italy) Gabriele Araudo	154:15	8	2.33	42	80.95	1

TOI = Time on ice (minutes:seconds); GA = Goals against; GAA = Goals against average; SA = Shots against; Sv% = Save percentage; SO = Shutouts
Source: PyeongChang 2018

== Awards ==
Best players selected by the directorate:

- Best Goaltender: (South Korea) Lee Jae-woong
- Best Defenceman: (Canada) Adam Dixon
- Best Forward: (United States) Brody Roybal

Source: PyeongChang 2018
