= Lee Ji-hoon =

Lee Ji-hoon may refer to:

- Lee Ji-hoon (entertainer) (born 1979) South Korean singer and actor
- Lee Ji-hoon (actor, born 1979), South Korean actor
- Lee Ji-hoon (actor, born 1988) South Korean actor
- Lee Ji-hoon (sledge hockey) (born 1989)
- Woozi, Lee Ji-hoon (born 1996), South Korean singer
