= 2017 World Para Ice Hockey Championships =

2017 World Para Ice Hockey Championships (A-Pool)
Tournament details
- Host country: South Korea
- Venue(s): Gangneung Hockey Centre; Gangneung
- Dates: 11–20 April 2017
- Teams: 7

Final positions
- Champions: Canada
- Runner-up: United States
- Third place: South Korea
- Fourth place: Norway

Official website
- gangneung2017.com

The 2017 World Para Ice Hockey Championships for A-Pool teams (Canada, Germany, Italy, Norway, South Korea, Sweden, United States) was held in Gangneung, South Korea, from 11 April through 20 April 2017. The opening ceremony was held on 11 April and games were played from 12 April through 20 April, followed by the closing ceremony.

This event was previously known as the IPC Ice Sledge Hockey World Championships. On 30 November 2016, the International Paralympic Committee adopted the "World Para" brand across the ten sports it governs, the official name of the sport changed from "sledge hockey" to "Para ice hockey", and the event became the "World Para Ice Hockey Championships".

The World Championships for B-Pool teams (Czech Republic, Great Britain, Japan, Slovakia) was held at Hakucho Arena in Tomakomai, Japan, from 28 November to 3 December 2016.

== A-Pool ==
=== Team rosters ===
Canada
Forwards: Rob Armstrong, Billy Bridges, Dominic Cozzolino, Ben Delaney, Liam Hickey, Tyler McGregor, Bryan Sholomicki, Corbyn Smith, Greg Westlake
Defenders: Steve Arsenault, Brad Bowden, Adam Dixon, James Gemmell, Tyrone Henry, Kevin Sorley
Goaltenders: Dominic Larocque, Corbin Watson

Germany
Forwards: Bas Disveld, Bernhard Hering, Ingo Kuhli-Lauenstein, Frank Rennhack, Udo Segreff, Joerg Wedde, Jacob Wolff
Defenders: Matthias Albanus, Christian Jaster, Robert Pabst, Christian Pilz, Hugo Raedler, Lucas Sklorz, Sven Stumpe
Goaltenders: Klaus Brzoska, Simon Kunst

Italy
Forwards: Alessandro Andreoni, Eusebiu Antochi, Valerio Corvino, Christoph Depaoli, Stephan Kafmann, Sandro Kalegaris, Nils Larch, Gregory Leperdi, Werner Winkler
Defenders: Bruno Balossetti, Gianluca Cavaliere, Andrea Macri, Florian Planker, Roberto Radice, Gianluigi Rosa
Goaltenders: Gabriele Araudo, Santino Stillitano

Norway
Forwards: Thommas Avdal, Audun Bakke, Magnus Bogle, Martin Hamre, Ola Oiseth, Tor Joakim Rivera, Loyd Remi Solberg, Emil Sorheim, Morten Vaernes, Emil Vatne
Defenders: Thomas Jacobsen, Jan Roger Klakegg, Knut Andre Nordstoga, Rolf Einar Pedersen
Goaltenders: Kissinger Deng, Kjell Christian Hamar

South Korea

Forwards: Cho Byeong-seok, Cho Young-jae, Choi Si-woo, Jang Jong-ho, Jung Seung-hwan, Lee Jong-kyung, Lee Ju-seung, Na Dae-seok, Ryu Jee-hyun
Defenders: Choi Kwang-hyouk, Han Min-su, Jang Dong-shin, Kim Young-sung, Park Woo-chul
Goaltenders: Lee Jae-woong, Yu Man-gyun

Sweden
Forwards: Goran Karlsson, Per Kasperi, Martin Magnevill, Robin Meng, Peter Nilsson, Peter Ojala, Filip Silvstrand Olsson, Niklas Rakos
Defenders: Christian Hedberg, Marcus Holm, Niklas Ingvarsson, Rasmus Isaksson, Rasmus Lundgren
Goaltenders: Andreas Neuman, Ulf Nilsson

United States
Forwards: Chris Douglas, Declan Farmer, Noah Grove, Luke McDermott, Kevin McKee, Adam Page, Rico Roman, Brody Roybal, Paul Schaus
Defenders: Tyler Carron, Billy Hanning, Nikko Landeros, Josh Pauls, Jack Wallace, Andy Yohe
Goaltenders: Steve Cash, Bo Reichenbach

=== Preliminary round ===
All times are local (UTC+9).

Pos	Team	Pld	W	OTW	OTL	L	GF	GA	GD	Pts	Qualification or relegation
1	United States	6	6	0	0	0	38	2	+36	18	Final
2	Canada	6	5	0	0	1	45	2	+43	15	Final
3	South Korea (H)	6	3	0	1	2	12	12	0	10	Bronze medal game
4	Norway	6	2	1	0	3	10	19	−9	8 (Note: Norway 1–0 Italy)	Bronze medal game
5	Italy	6	2	1	0	3	11	20	−9	8	Fifth place game
6	Sweden	6	1	0	0	5	4	38	−34	3	Fifth place game
7	Germany	6	0	0	1	5	2	29	−27	1	Relegated to 2019 B-Pool

(H) Host
Notes:

12 April 2017; 11:00	Italy	2–1 (1–0, 1–1, 0–0)	Sweden	Gangneung Hockey Centre, Gangneung

Game reference

12 April 2017; 15:00	Canada	9–0 (6–0, 1–0, 2–0)	Norway	Gangneung Hockey Centre, Gangneung

Game reference

12 April 2017; 19:00	Germany	1–2 (0–0, 0–1, 1–1)	South Korea	Gangneung Hockey Centre, Gangneung

Game reference

13 April 2017; 11:00	United States	7–0 (3–0, 1–0, 3–0)	Sweden	Gangneung Hockey Centre, Gangneung

Game reference

13 April 2017; 15:00	Canada	7–0 (4–0, 0–0, 3–0)	Italy	Gangneung Hockey Centre, Gangneung

Game reference

13 April 2017; 19:00	Norway	2–1 OT (1–0, 0–0, 0–1) (OT: 1–0)	Germany	Gangneung Hockey Centre, Gangneung

Game reference

14 April 2017; 11:00	United States	9–1 (3–0, 4–1, 2–0)	Italy	Gangneung Hockey Centre, Gangneung

Game reference

14 April 2017; 15:00	Canada	17–0 (8–0, 4–0, 5–0)	Sweden	Gangneung Hockey Centre, Gangneung

Game reference

14 April 2017; 19:00	Norway	1–2 (0–1, 1–0, 0–1)	South Korea	Gangneung Hockey Centre, Gangneung

Game reference

15 April 2017; 11:00	Canada	2–0 (1–0, 1–0, 0–0)	South Korea	Gangneung Hockey Centre, Gangneung

Game reference

15 April 2017; 15:00	United States	9–0 (3–0, 3–0, 3–0)	Germany	Gangneung Hockey Centre, Gangneung

Game reference

15 April 2017; 19:00	Norway	6–1 (1–0, 3–1, 2–0)	Sweden	Gangneung Hockey Centre, Gangneung

Game reference

17 April 2017; 11:00	Italy	5–0 (2–0, 1–0, 2–0)	Germany	Gangneung Hockey Centre, Gangneung

Game reference

17 April 2017; 15:00	United States	2–1 (0–1, 2–0, 0–0)	Canada	Gangneung Hockey Centre, Gangneung

Game reference

17 April 2017; 19:00	South Korea	6–0 (1–0, 2–0, 3–0)	Sweden	Gangneung Hockey Centre, Gangneung

Game reference

18 April 2017; 11:00	United States	6–0 (1–0, 4–0, 1–0)	Norway	Gangneung Hockey Centre, Gangneung

Game reference

18 April 2017; 15:00	Italy	3–2 GWS (0–1, 0–1, 2–0) (OT: 0–0) (SO: 1–0)	South Korea	Gangneung Hockey Centre, Gangneung

Game reference

18 April 2017; 19:00	Germany	0–2 (0–1, 0–0, 0–1)	Sweden	Gangneung Hockey Centre, Gangneung

Game reference

19 April 2017; 11:00	Canada	9–0 (2–0, 3–0, 4–0)	Germany	Gangneung Hockey Centre, Gangneung

Game reference

19 April 2017; 15:00	United States	5–0 (3–0, 1–0, 1–0)	South Korea	Gangneung Hockey Centre, Gangneung

Game reference

19 April 2017; 19:00	Norway	1–0 (0–0, 1–0, 0–0)	Italy	Gangneung Hockey Centre, Gangneung

Game reference

=== Final round ===
==== Fifth place game ====
20 April 2017; 11:00	Italy	4–0 (1–0, 2–0, 1–0)	Sweden	Gangneung Hockey Centre, Gangneung

Game reference

==== Bronze medal game ====
20 April 2017; 15:00	South Korea	3–2 (2–0, 0–0, 1–2)	Norway	Gangneung Hockey Centre, Gangneung

Game reference

==== Final ====
20 April 2017; 19:00	United States	1–4 (0–2, 0–2, 1–0)	Canada	Gangneung Hockey Centre, Gangneung

Game reference

=== Final standings ===
Rank	Team
1st place, gold medalist(s)	Canada
2nd place, silver medalist(s)	United States
3rd place, bronze medalist(s)	South Korea
4	Norway
5	Italy
6	Sweden
7	Germany ▼

=== Awards ===
- Best players selected by the Directorate:
  - Best Goaltender: (Sweden) Ulf Nilsson
  - Best Defenceman: (Canada) Adam Dixon
  - Best Forward: (United States) Greg Westlake

Source: IPC

== B-Pool ==
=== Preliminary round ===
All times are local (UTC+9).

Pos	Team	Pld	W	OTW	OTL	L	GF	GA	GD	Pts	Qualification
1	Czech Republic	3	3	0	0	0	17	0	+17	9	Final
2	Japan (H)	3	2	0	0	1	9	3	+6	6	Final
3	Slovakia	3	1	0	0	2	2	6	−4	3	Third place game
4	Great Britain	3	0	0	0	3	0	19	−19	0	Third place game

(H) Host

29 November 2016; 14:30	Czech Republic	12–0 (4–0, 5–0, 3–0)	Great Britain	Hakucho Arena, Tomakomai

Game reference

29 November 2016; 17:30	Japan	3–1 (2–0, 0–1, 1–0)	Slovakia	Hakucho Arena, Tomakomai

Game reference

30 November 2016; 14:30	Czech Republic	3–0 (0–0, 2–0, 1–0)	Slovakia	Hakucho Arena, Tomakomai

Game reference

30 November 2016; 17:30	Japan	6–0 (3–0, 1–0, 2–0)	Great Britain	Hakucho Arena, Tomakomai

Game reference

2 December 2016; 14:30	Slovakia	1–0 (1–0, 0–0, 0–0)	Great Britain	Hakucho Arena, Tomakomai

Game reference

2 December 2016; 17:30	Czech Republic	2–0 (2–0, 0–0, 0–0)	Japan	Hakucho Arena, Tomakomai

Game reference

=== Final round ===
==== Third place game ====
3 December 2016; 11:00	Slovakia	5–1 (2–0, 2–0, 1–1)	Great Britain	Hakucho Arena, Tomakomai

==== Final ====
3 December 2016; 14:30	Czech Republic	6–0 (3–0, 3–0, 0–0)	Japan	Hakucho Arena, Tomakomai

=== Final standings ===
Rank	Team
1	Czech Republic ▲
2	Japan ▲
3	Slovakia
4	Great Britain
