= Bo Reichenbach =

American ice sled hockey player

Personal information
- Born: January 7, 1988 (age 38) Billings, Montana, U.S.
- Height: 6 ft 0 in (183 cm)
- Weight: 175 lb (79 kg)
Medal record
Men's para ice hockey
Representing United States
World Championships
Silver medal – second place	2017 Gangneung	Team competition

Bo Reichenbach (born January 7, 1988, in Billings, Montana) is an American ice sled hockey player.

Reichenbach is a former U.S. Navy SEAL who was injured by an improvised explosive device in Afghanistan in July 2012.

He was a member of the United States silver medal-winning team at the 2017 World Para Ice Hockey Championships in Gangneung, South Korea.
