= Nikko Landeros =

American ice sledge hockey player (born 1989)

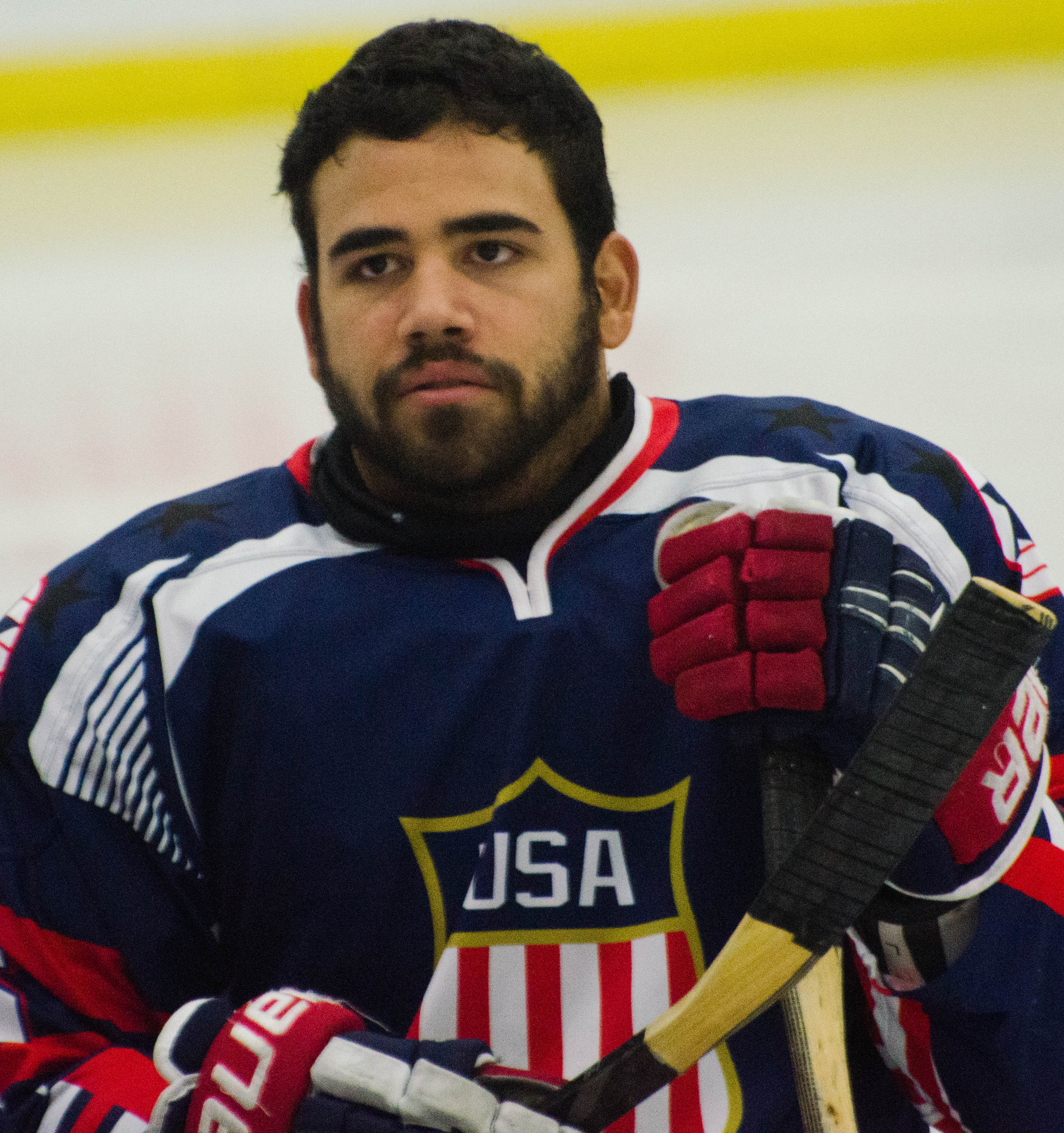
- Landeros in 2015

Personal information
- Born: August 28, 1989 (age 37) San Francisco, California, U.S.
Medal record
Representing United States
Para ice hockey
Paralympic Games
Gold medal – first place	2010 Vancouver	Team competition
Gold medal – first place	2014 Sochi	Team competition
Gold medal – first place	2018 PyeongChang	Team competition
World Championships
Gold medal – first place	2012 Hamar	Team competition
Gold medal – first place	2015 Buffalo	Team competition
Silver medal – second place	2013 Goyang	Team competition
Silver medal – second place	2017 Gangneung	Team competition
Men's freestyle skiing
Winter X Games
Silver medal – second place	2016 Aspen	Mono Skier X

Nikko Landeros (born April 28, 1989) is an ice sled hockey player and paralympic freestyle skier from the United States.

He took part in the 2010 Winter Paralympics in Vancouver, where USA won gold. They beat Japan 2–0 in the final. He was also on the team USA in the 2014 Winter Paralympics in Sochi, which won gold by beating Russia 1–0 in the final.

He and his best friend Tyler Carron had an accident when they were 17. Both lost their legs. His father is a native of Mexico and his mother is from Milan, Italy.
