= Choi Si-woo =

South Korean ice sledge hockey player (born 1996)

Personal information
- Nationality: South Korean
- Born: 12 November 1996 (age 29)

Korean name
- Hangul: 최시우
- RR: Choe Siu
- MR: Ch'oe Siu
Medal record
Para ice hockey
Representing South Korea
Paralympic Games
| Bronze medal – third place | 2018 PyeongChang | Team competition |
World Championships
| Bronze medal – third place | 2017 Gangneung | Team competition |
| Bronze medal – third place | 2019 Ostrava | Team competition |

Choi Si-woo (Korean: 최시우; born 12 November 1996) is a South Korean ice sledge hockey player. He was a member of South Korea's bronze medal winning team in Para ice hockey at the 2018 Winter Paralympics.
