= Bryan Sholomicki =

Canadian ice sledge hockey player

Personal information
- Born: 8 February 1981 (age 45)
Medal record
Para ice hockey
Representing Canada
Paralympic Games
| Silver medal – second place | 2018 Pyeongchang | Team competition |
World Championships
| Gold medal – first place | 2017 Gangneung | Team competition |
| Silver medal – second place | 2015 Buffalo | Team competition |

Bryan Sholomicki (born 8 February 1981) is an ice sledge hockey player who was on the Canadian team that earned a silver medal in Para ice hockey at the 2018 Winter Paralympics. His disability is due to a motorcycle accident.
