= Lee Jae-woong (sledge hockey) =

South Korean sledge hockey player

Personal information
- Nationality: South Korean
- Born: 17 March 1996 (age 30)
Medal record
Para ice hockey
Representing South Korea
Paralympic Games
Bronze medal – third place	2018 PyeongChang	Team competition
World Championships
Bronze medal – third place	2017 Gangneung	Team competition
Bronze medal – third place	2019 Ostrava	Team competition

Lee Jae-woong (Korean: 이재웅; born 17 March 1996) is a South Korean sledge hockey player. He was a member of South Korea's bronze medal winning team in para ice hockey at the 2018 Winter Paralympics. Lee is the team goalie and has cerebral palsy.
