= Lee Hae-man =

South Korean sledge hockey player

Personal information
- Nationality: South Korean
- Born: 20 February 1972 (age 54)
Medal record
Para ice hockey
Representing South Korea
Paralympic Games
Bronze medal – third place	2018 PyeongChang	Team competition
World Championships
Silver medal – second place	2012 Hamar	Team competition

Lee Hae-man (Korean: 이해만, born 20 February 1972) is a South Korean sledge hockey player. He was a member of South Korea's bronze medal winning team in para ice hockey at the 2018 Winter Paralympics. Lee also competed in the 2010 Winter Paralympics.
