= Billy Hanning Jr. =

American ice sledge hockey player

Personal information
- Born: April 18, 1985 (age 41) St. Louis, Missouri, U.S.
- Home town: High Ridge, Missouri, U.S.
- Height: 5 ft 10 in (178 cm)
Medal record
Para ice hockey
Representing United States
Paralympic Games
| Gold medal – first place | 2018 PyeongChang | Team competition |
World Championships
| Gold medal – first place | 2015 Buffalo | Team competition |
| Silver medal – second place | 2017 Gangneung | Team competition |

Billy Hanning Jr. (born April 18, 1985) was a member of the gold medal-winning US team in Para ice hockey at the 2018 Winter Paralympics. He is a defenseman. Hanning lost a limb due to cancer.
