= Rob Armstrong =

Canadian ice sledge hockey player

Personal information
- Nationality: Canadian
- Born: September 12, 1996 (age 29) Guelph, Ontario, Canada
Medal record
Para ice hockey
Representing Canada
Paralympic Games
Silver medal – second place	2018 Pyeongchang	Team competition
Silver medal – second place	2022 Beijing	Team competition
Silver medal – second place	2026 Milano Cortina	Team competition
World Championships
Gold medal – first place	2017 Gangneung	Team competition
Gold medal – first place	2024 Calgary	Team competition
Silver medal – second place	2019 Ostrava	Team competition
Silver medal – second place	2021 Ostrava	Team competition
Silver medal – second place	2023 Moose Jaw	Team competition
Silver medal – second place	2025 Buffalo	Team competition

Rob Armstrong (born September 12, 1996) is a Canadian ice sledge hockey player.

== Career ==
He represented Canada at the 2018 and 2022 Winter Paralympics, and won silver medals. after helping his team win Gold in 2017 at World Para Ice Hockey Championships. Armstrong is a three-time silver medalist at World Sledge Hockey Challenge.

He competed at the 2026 Winter Paralympics and won a silver medal, Canada's third consecutive silver medal in Para ice hockey at the Winter Paralympics.

== Personal life ==
His disability is due to a childhood infection of the spine. He began playing para ice hockey a few years later after he fell in love with the sport while playing goaltender in road hockey with his friends.
