= Ben Delaney =

Canadian ice sledge hockey player

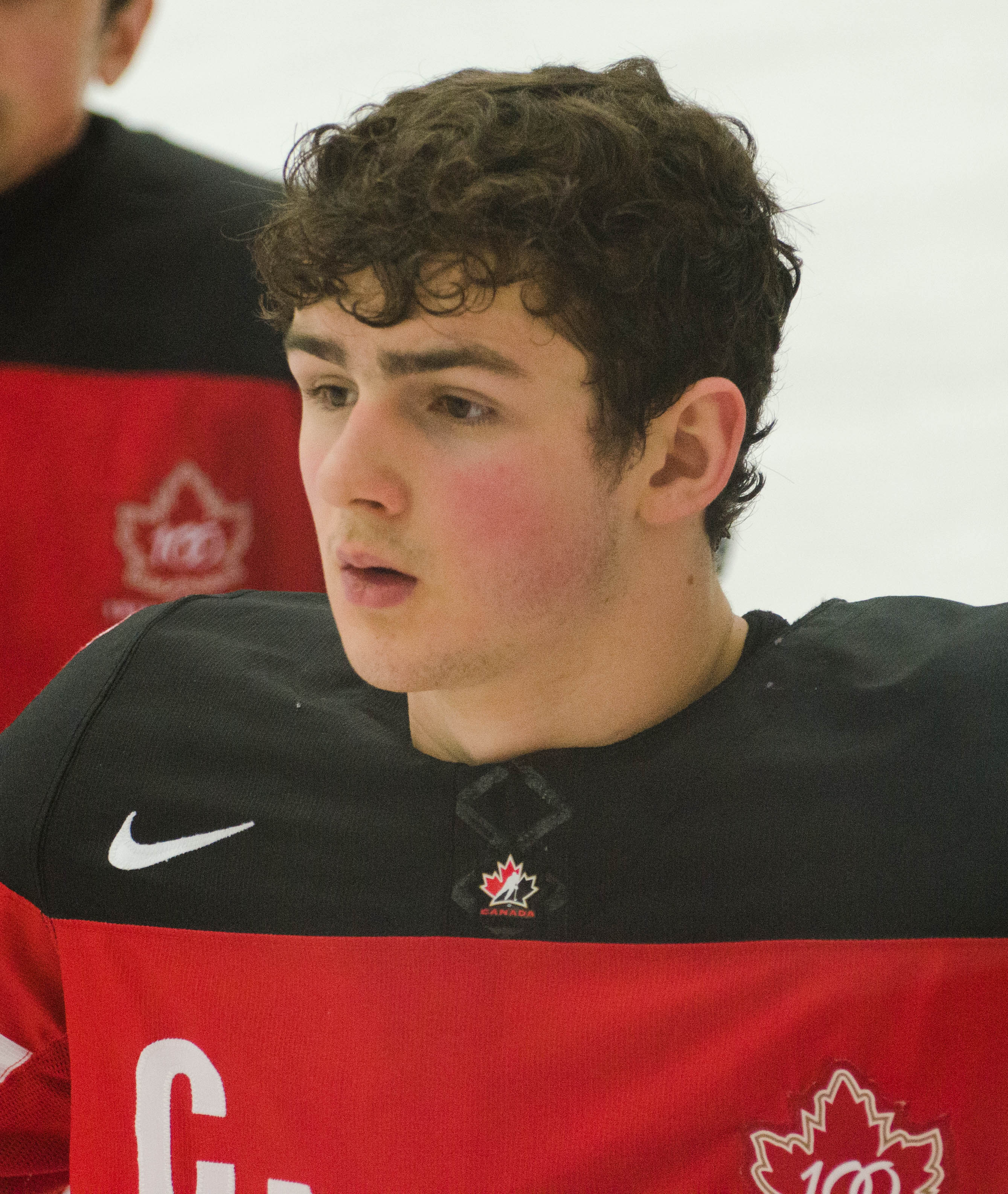
- Delaney in 2015
- Born: August 23, 1996 (age 30) Ottawa, Ontario, Canada
- Height: 5 ft 11 in (180 cm)
- Weight: 155 lb (70 kg; 11 st 1 lb)
- Position: Forward
- National team: Canada
- Playing career: 2010–present
Medal record
Para ice hockey
Representing Canada
Paralympic Games
Silver medal – second place	2018 Pyeongchang	Team
Silver medal – second place	2022 Beijing	Team competition
Bronze medal – third place	2014 Sochi	Team
World Championships
Gold medal – first place	2017 Gangneung	Team
Silver medal – second place	2015 Buffalo	Team

Ben Delaney (born August 23, 1996) is a Canadian ice sledge hockey player. He won a bronze medal at the 2014 Winter Paralympics, and silver medals at the 2018 and 2022 Winter Paralympics.

== Personal life ==
At the age of twelve, Delaney was diagnosed with osteosarcoma, the same cancer that Canadian hero Terry Fox had. He had an above the knee amputation with the replacement of his knee with ankle bones. Formerly an active and successful multi-sport stand up athlete, he took up sledge hockey in 2010 with the Ottawa Sledgehammers.

He graduated from St. Pius X High School in Ottawa, and now trains and competes for Team Canada full time. Ben's parents are Anthony and Mary Ann and he has one sister, Hannah. His father is also an avid sledge hockey player.

== Career ==
Delaney made his Team Canada debut at the Four Nations pre-Paralympic tournament in Sochi, Russia in August and September 2014. On August 27, 2014, in his first game, against the Czech Republic, he scored his first goal.

He was selected to represent Canada at the 2014 Winter Paralympics, making him the youngest team member of Canada's sledge hockey athletes.

On March 8, 2014, Delaney scored his first goal at the Paralympics during Canada's 10-1 preliminary round victory over Sweden.

On March 18, 2018, Delaney added to his Paralympic medal collection with a silver medal at the Pyeongchang Paralympic Games.
