= Kim Dea-jung =

South Korean sledge hockey player

Personal information
- Nationality: South Korean
- Born: 7 July 1970 (age 55)

Korean name
- Hangul: 김대중
- RR: Gim Daejung
- MR: Kim Taejung
Medal record
Para ice hockey
Representing South Korea
Paralympic Games
Bronze medal – third place	2018 PyeongChang	Team competition
World Championships
Bronze medal – third place	2019 Ostrava	Team competition

Kim Dea-jung (born 7 July 1970) is a South Korean sledge hockey player. He was a member of South Korea's bronze medal winning team in para ice hockey at the 2018 Winter Paralympics.
