= Kim Young-sung =

South Korean sledge hockey player

Personal information
- Nationality: South Korea
- Born: 1 May 1983 (age 43)
Medal record
Para ice hockey
Representing South Korea
Paralympic Games
Bronze medal – third place	2018 PyeongChang	Team competition
World Championships
Silver medal – second place	2012 Hamar	Team competition
Bronze medal – third place	2017 Gangneung	Team competition
Bronze medal – third place	2019 Ostrava	Team competition

Kim Young-sung (Korean: 김영성, born 1 May 1983) is a South Korean ice sledge hockey player. He played in the 2014 Paralympic Winter Games. He also won a silver medal at the 2012 IPC Ice Sledge Hockey World Championships. Kim was a member of South Korea's bronze medal winning team in para ice hockey at the 2018 Winter Paralympics.
