= Liam Hickey =

Canadian ice sledge hockey player (born 1998)

Personal information
- Born: March 25, 1998 (age 28) St. John's, Newfoundland and Labrador
Medal record
Para ice hockey
Representing Canada
Paralympic Games
Silver medal – second place	2018 Pyeongchang	Team competition
Silver medal – second place	2022 Beijing	Team competition
Silver medal – second place	2026 Milano Cortina	Team competition
World Championships
Gold medal – first place	2017 Gangneung	Team competition
Gold medal – first place	2024 Calgary	Team competition
Silver medal – second place	2019 Ostrava	Team competition
Silver medal – second place	2021 Ostrava	Team competition
Silver medal – second place	2025 Buffalo	Team competition

Liam Hickey ONL (born March 25, 1998) is a Canadian sledge hockey player.

== Career ==
After strong showings early in his career, he was offered an invite to join Team Canada's training camp for their National Sledge Hockey Team in Calgary, Alberta, where he played forward and was the lone person from Newfoundland invited. He was a member of the silver medal-winning Canadian team of para ice hockey at the 2018 Winter Paralympics. Hickey also competed for Canada at the 2015 Parapan American Games in wheelchair basketball as well as the 2016 Summer Paralympics. He was born without a femur in his right leg.

Hickey was made a Member of the Order of Newfoundland and Labrador in 2024.

He competed at the 2026 Winter Paralympics and won a silver medal, Canada's third consecutive silver medal in Para ice hockey at the Winter Paralympics.
