= Tyler Carron =

American ice sledge hockey player

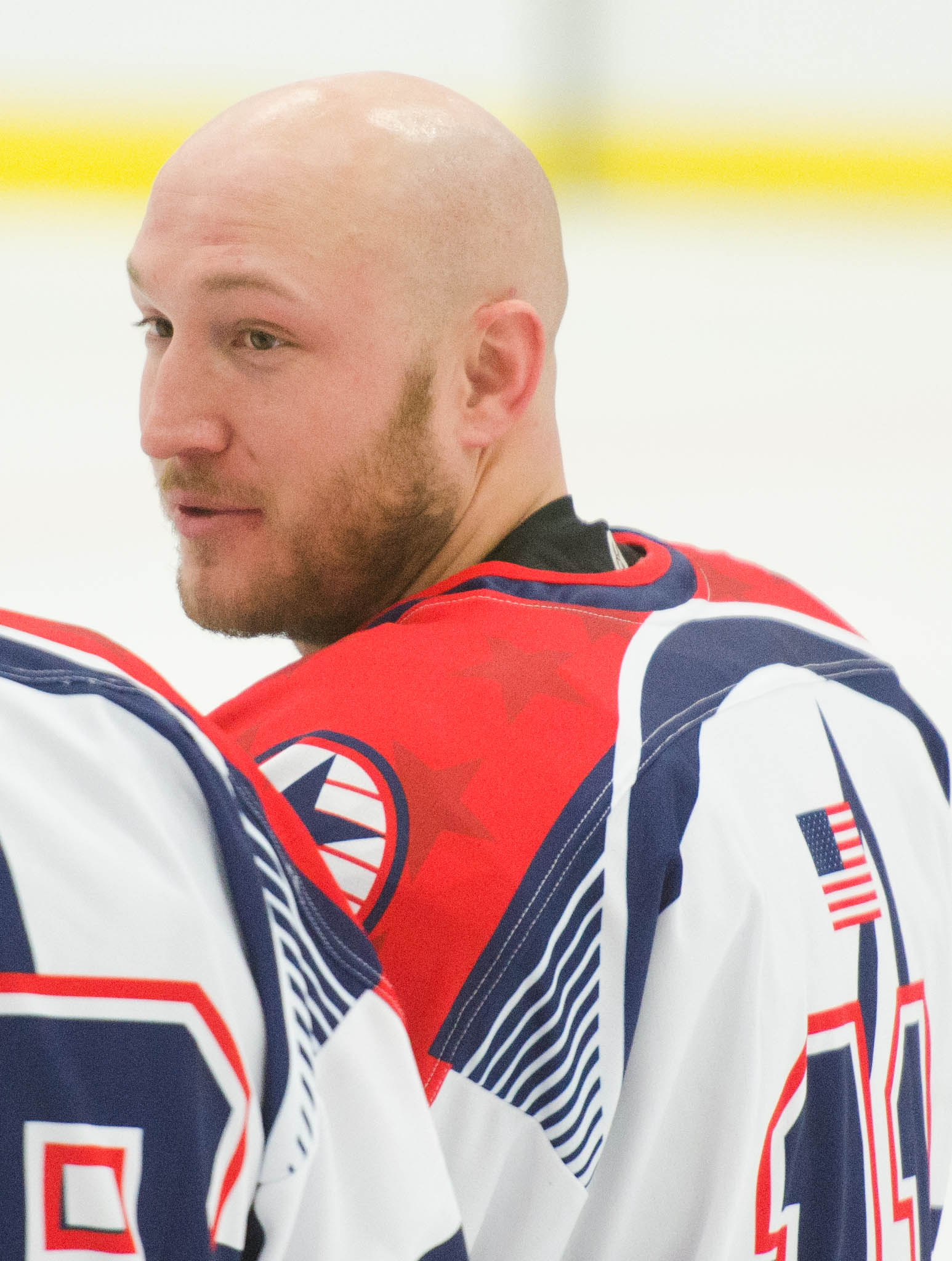
- Carron in 2015

Personal information
- Born: May 11, 1989 (age 37) Berthoud, Colorado, U.S.
- Years active: 2008–present
- Height: 6 ft 0 in (183 cm)
- Weight: 165 lb (75 kg)

Sport
- Country: United States
- Sport: Ice sled hockey
- Position: Forward
Medal record
Para ice hockey
Representing United States
Paralympic Games
Gold medal – first place	2014 Sochi	Team competition
Disqualified	2018 PyeongChang	Team competition
World Championships
Gold medal – first place	2012 Hamar	Team competition
Gold medal – first place	2015 Buffalo	Team competition
Silver medal – second place	2013 Goyang	Team competition
Silver medal – second place	2017 Gangneung	Team competition

Tyler Carron (born May 11, 1989) is an American ice sled hockey player. Carron was born in Berthoud, Colorado. He is a bilateral amputee after a being struck by a car in high school. He won a gold medal with the American team at the 2014 Winter Paralympics and was also the member of the US ice hockey team which secured record 4th Winter Paralympic gold medal during the 2018 Winter Paralympics. Carron was banned for 18 months between March 2018 and September 2019 after testing positive for methadone at the 2018 Paralympic Games in Pyeongchang. He was also stripped of the gold medal won at the Games.
