= Adam Page (sledge hockey) =

American ice sledge hockey player

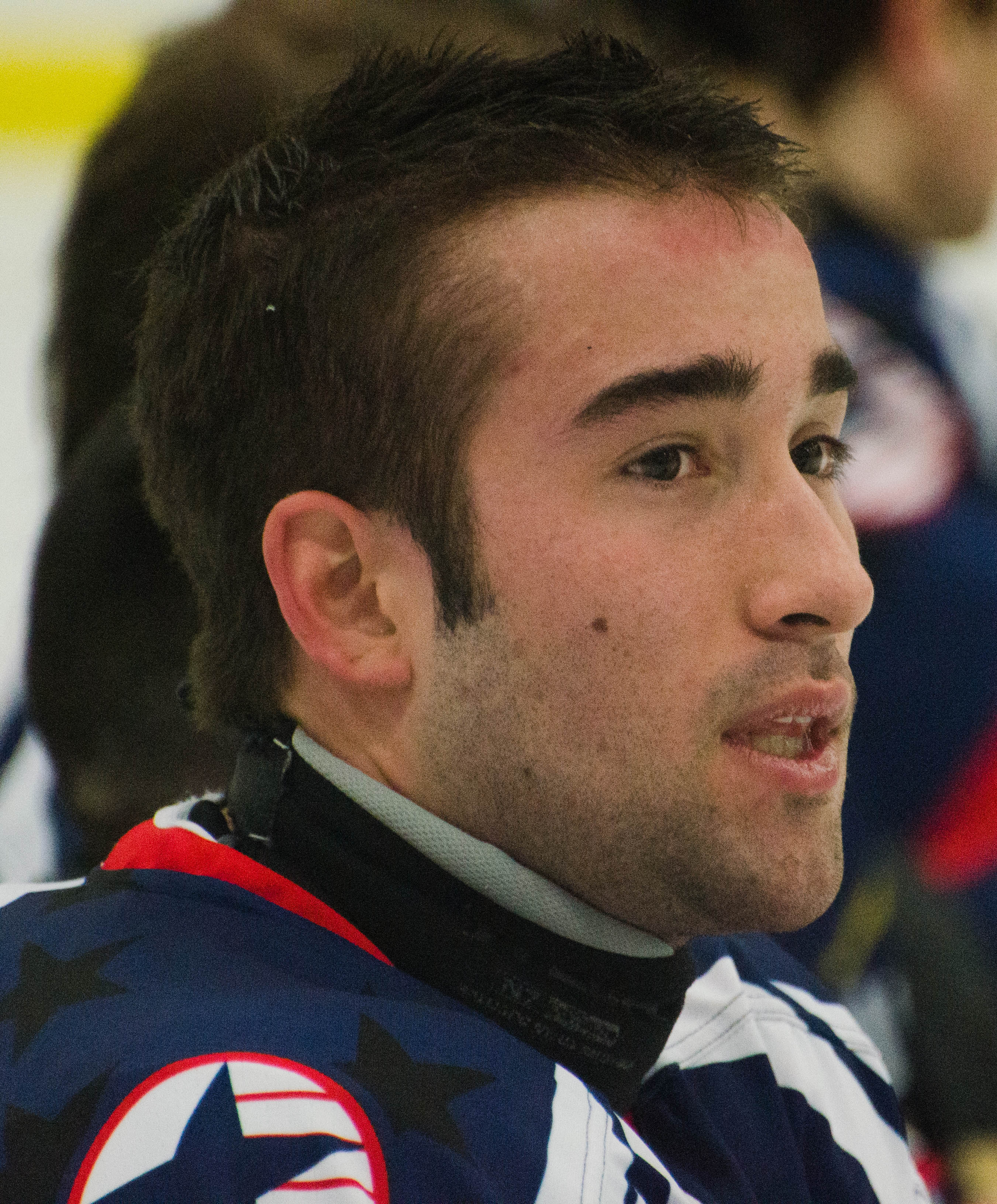
- Page in 2015
- Born: March 10, 1992 (age 34) Buffalo, NY, USA
- Height: 5 ft 6 in (168 cm)
- Weight: 170 lb (77 kg; 12 st 2 lb)
- Position: Forward
- Playing career: 2006–present
Medal record
Para ice hockey
Representing United States
Paralympic Games
Gold medal – first place	2010 Vancouver	Team competition
Gold medal – first place	2014 Sochi	Team competition
Gold medal – first place	2018 PyeongChang	Team competition
World Championships
Gold medal – first place	2009 Ostrava	Team competition
Gold medal – first place	2012 Hamar	Team competition
Gold medal – first place	2015 Buffalo	Team competition
Silver medal – second place	2013 Goyang	Team competition
Silver medal – second place	2017 Gangneung	Team competition
Bronze medal – third place	2008 Marlborough	Team competition

Adam Glynn Page (born 10 March 1992) is an ice sled hockey player and Paralympic gold medalist. He won the gold medal with Team USA while competing at the 2010, 2014, and 2018 Winter Paralympics.

Page is a resident of Lancaster, New York and graduated from St. Mary's High School and subsequently Medaille College. Page began his professional career while still a high school student. He was able to participate in team activities with the hockey program at St Mary's as well. By the last quarter of his senior year, he returned with the first of his three Paralympic gold medals. At Medaille, he became a Paralympic gold medalist for the second time while pursuing his Bachelor's of Science in sport management.

Along with his father Norm, Page founded a local non-for-profit organization promoting sled hockey. The organization later became Greater Buffalo Adaptive Sports in 2018.
