= Yu Man-gyun =

South Korean ice sledge hockey player

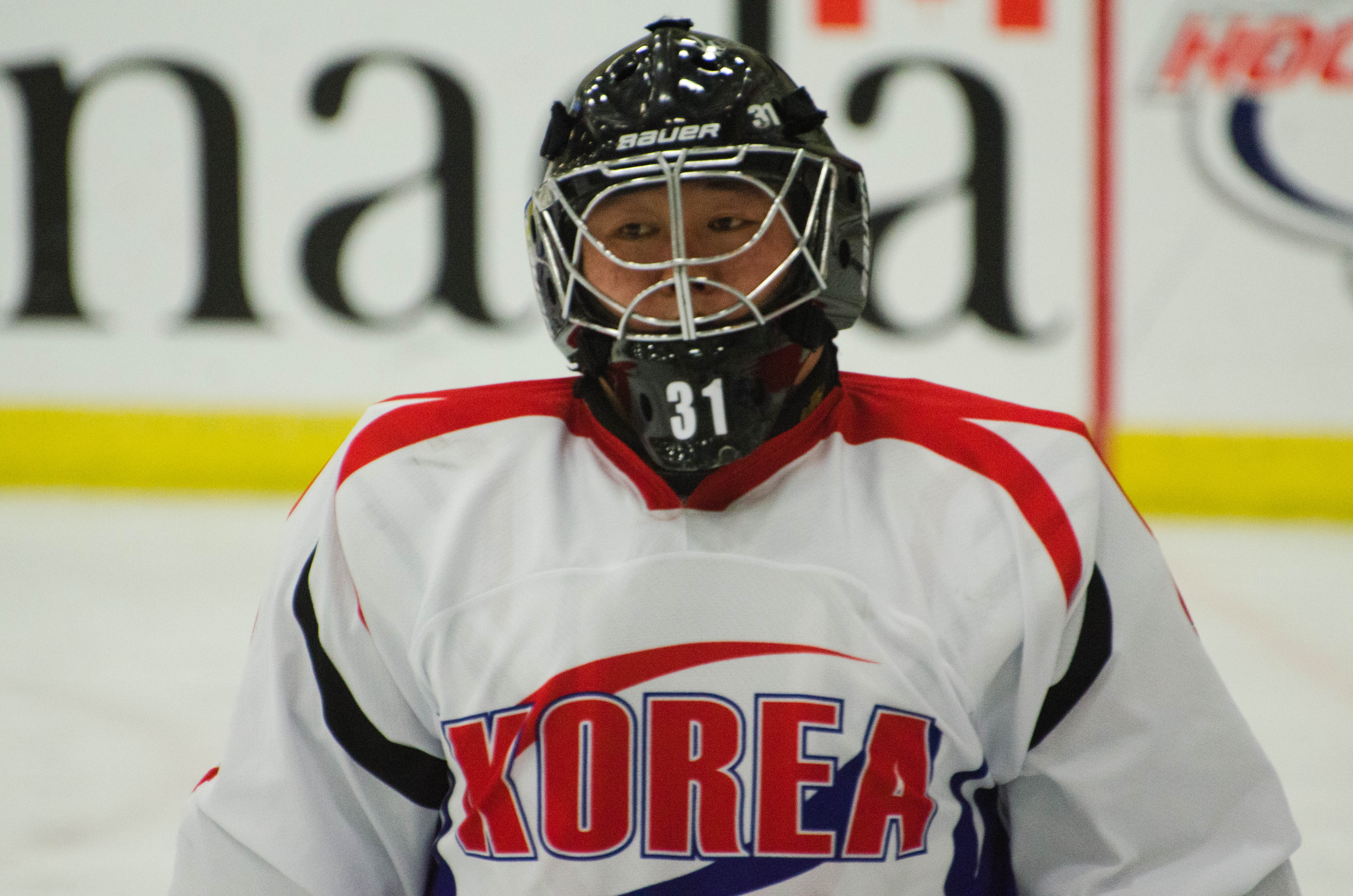
- Yu in 2015

Personal information
- Nationality: South Korea
- Born: 3 April 1974 (age 52)

Sport

Korean name
- Hangul: 유만균
- RR: Yu Mangyun
- MR: Yu Man'gyun
Medal record
Para ice hockey
Representing South Korea
Paralympic Games
Bronze medal – third place	2018 PyeongChang	Team competition
World Championships
Silver medal – second place	2012 Hamar	Team competition
Bronze medal – third place	2017 Gangneung	Team competition
Bronze medal – third place	2019 Ostrava	Team competition

Yu Man-gyun (born 3 April 1974) is a South Korean sledge hockey goalkeeper who used to be a wheelchair basketball player. During his career, he scored 2.66 goals and did .815 percentage of saves. In 2013, his save percentage was .894 despite the fact that his team lost 5–2 to Canada at the 2013 World Sledge Hockey Challenge. In 2012, he won silver medal at the 2012 IPC Ice Sledge Hockey World Championships which was hosted at Hamar, Norway. Yu was a member of South Korea's bronze medal winning team in para ice hockey at the 2018 Winter Paralympics.
