= Josh Misiewicz =

American ice sledge hockey player

Personal information
- Full name: Joshua Misiewicz
- Born: June 25, 1988 (age 38) Berwyn, Illinois, U.S.
Medal record
Para ice hockey
Representing United States
Paralympic Games
Gold medal – first place	2018 Pyeongchang	Team competition
Gold medal – first place	2022 Beijing	Team competition
Gold medal – first place	2026 Milano Cortina	Team competition
World Championships
Gold medal – first place	2015 Buffalo	Team competition
Gold medal – first place	2021 Ostrava	Team competition
Gold medal – first place	2023 Moose Jaw	Team competition
Gold medal – first place	2025 Buffalo	Team competition
Silver medal – second place	2024 Calgary	Team competition

Joshua Misiewicz (born June 25, 1988) is an American ice sled hockey player.

== Early life ==
He played hockey for Saint Mary's University of Minnesota, Winona, Minnesota.

== Career ==
He was a member of the gold medal-winning US team at the 2018 and 2022 Winter Paralympics. On January 2, 2026, he was named to Team USA's roster for the 2026 Winter Paralympics. He won a gold medal, Team USA's fifth consecutive gold medal in Para ice hockey at the Winter Paralympics.

== Personal life ==
He was wounded in action while serving as a United States Marine Corps in the War in Afghanistan.
