= Jung Seung-hwan (sledge hockey) =

South Korean sledge hockey player

Jung Seung-Hwan
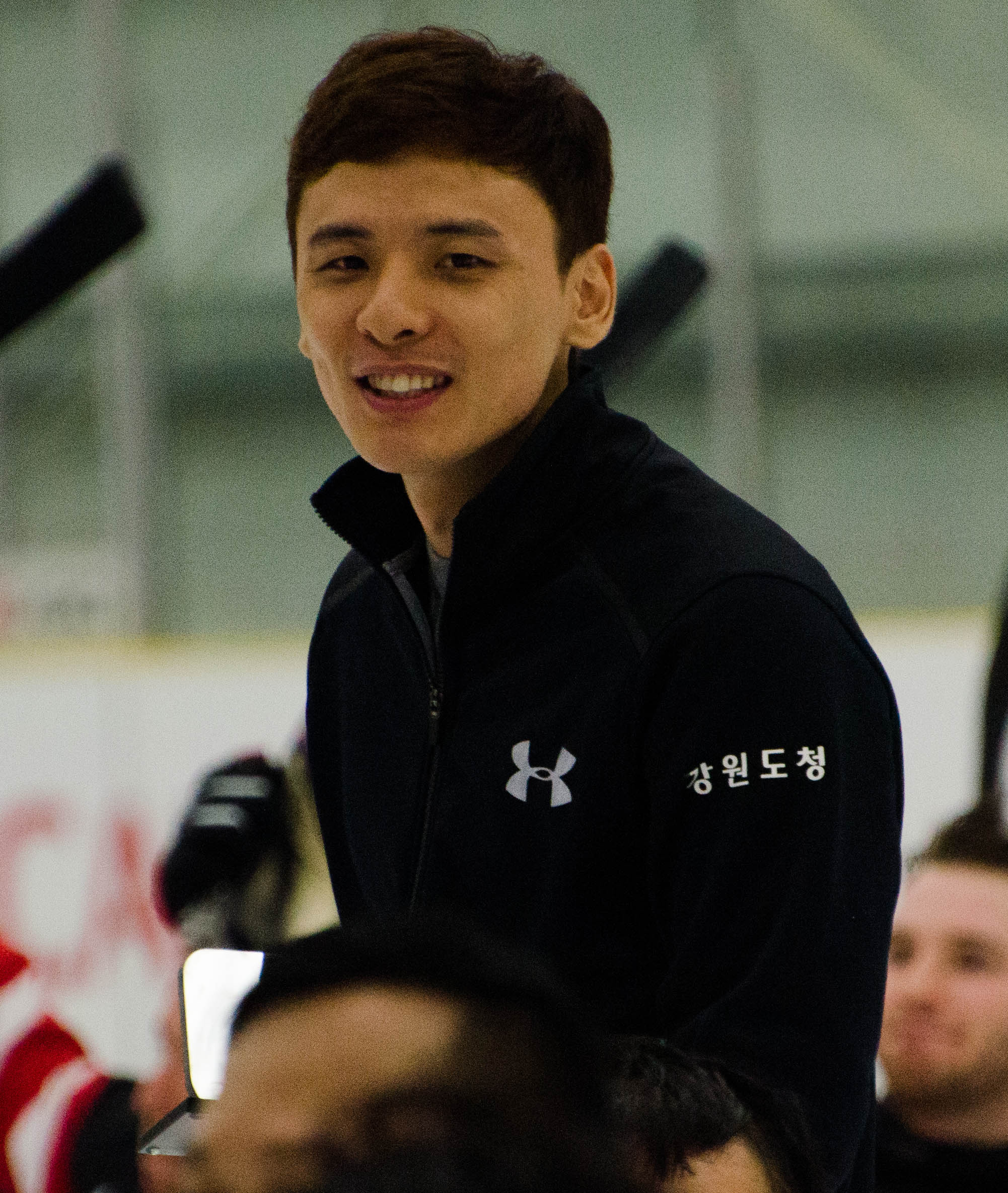
- Jung in 2015

Personal information
- Nationality: South Korea
- Born: 1 April 1986 (age 40) Mokpo, South Korea
Medal record
Para ice hockey
Representing South Korea
Paralympic Games
Bronze medal – third place	2018 PyeongChang	Team competition
World Championships
Silver medal – second place	2012 Hamar	Team competition
Bronze medal – third place	2017 Gangneung	Team competition
Bronze medal – third place	2019 Ostrava	Team competition

Jung Seung-hwan (born 1 April 1986) is a South Korean ice sledge hockey player. He played in the 2010, 2014, 2018 and 2022 Paralympic Winter Games. He won a silver medal at the 2012 IPC Ice Sledge Hockey World Championships. Jung was a member of South Korea's bronze medal winning team in para ice hockey at the 2018 Winter Paralympics.
