= Cho Young-jae =

South Korean sledge hockey player

Cho Young-Jae
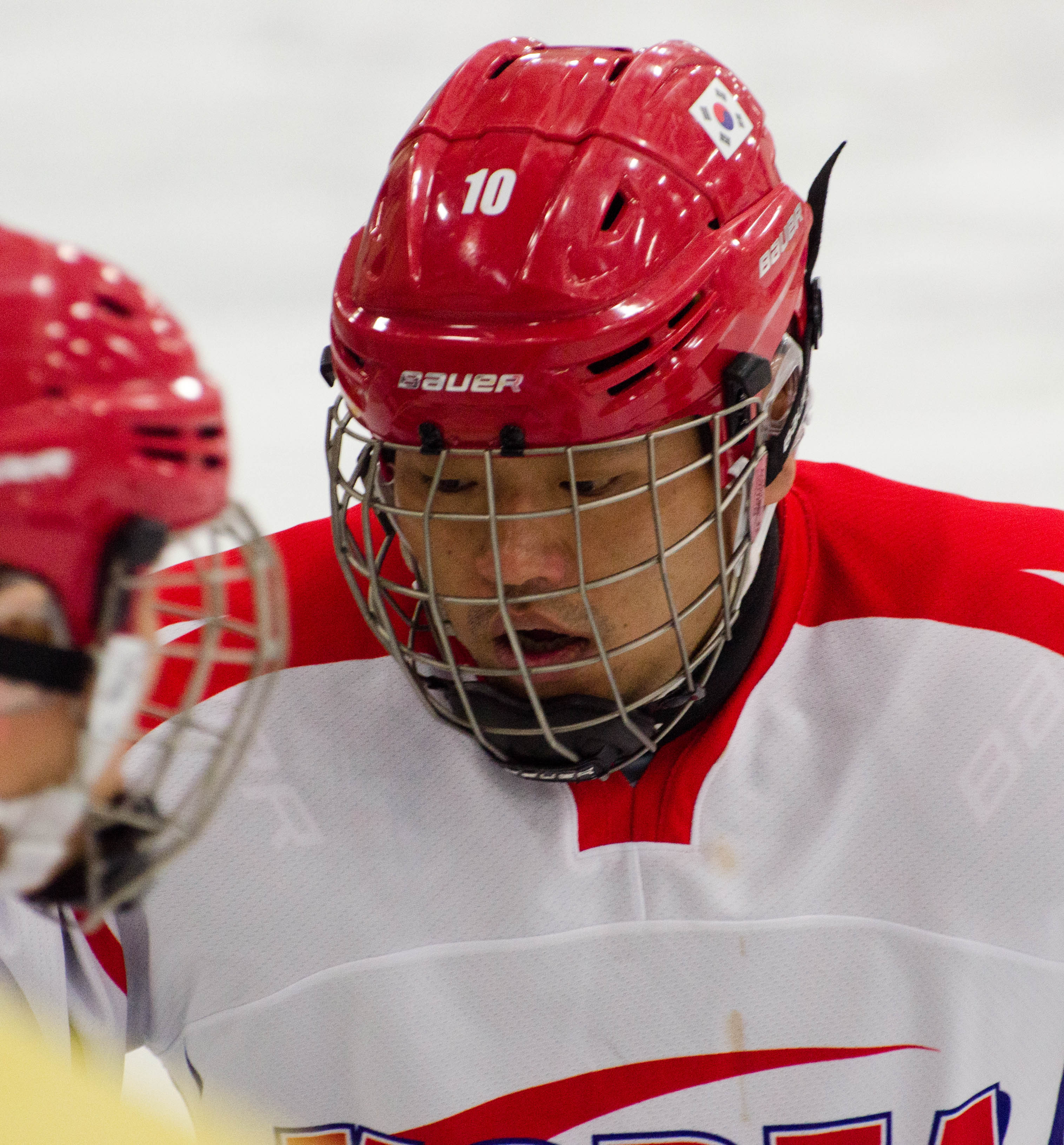
- Cho in 2015

Personal information
- Nationality: South Korea
- Born: 10 January 1985 (age 41) Chuncheon, South Korea
Medal record
Para ice hockey
Representing South Korea
Paralympic Games
Bronze medal – third place	2018 PyeongChang	Team competition
World Championships
Silver medal – second place	2012 Hamar	Team competition
Bronze medal – third place	2017 Gangneung	Team competition
Bronze medal – third place	2019 Ostrava	Team competition

Cho Young-jae (Korean: 조영재; born 10 January 1985) is a South Korean ice sledge hockey player. He played in the 2010 and 2014 Paralympic Winter Games. He won a silver medal at the 2012 IPC Ice Sledge Hockey World Championships. Cho was a member of South Korea's bronze medal winning team in para ice hockey at the 2018 Winter Paralympics.
