= Lee Ji-hoon (sledge hockey) =

South Korean ice sledge hockey player

Personal information
- Born: 9 April 1989 (age 37) Suwon, South Korea
Medal record
Para ice hockey
Representing South Korea
Paralympic Games
Bronze medal – third place	2018 Pyeongchang	Team competition

Lee Ji-hoon (Korean: 이지훈; RR: I Jihun, born 9 April 1989) in Suwon) is a South Korean ice sledge hockey player. He was part of the Korean team that won a bronze medal at the 2018 Winter Paralympics.

He lost his legs following an accident when he was 21.
