= Jang Dong-shin =

South Korean sledge hockey player

Jang Dong-Shin
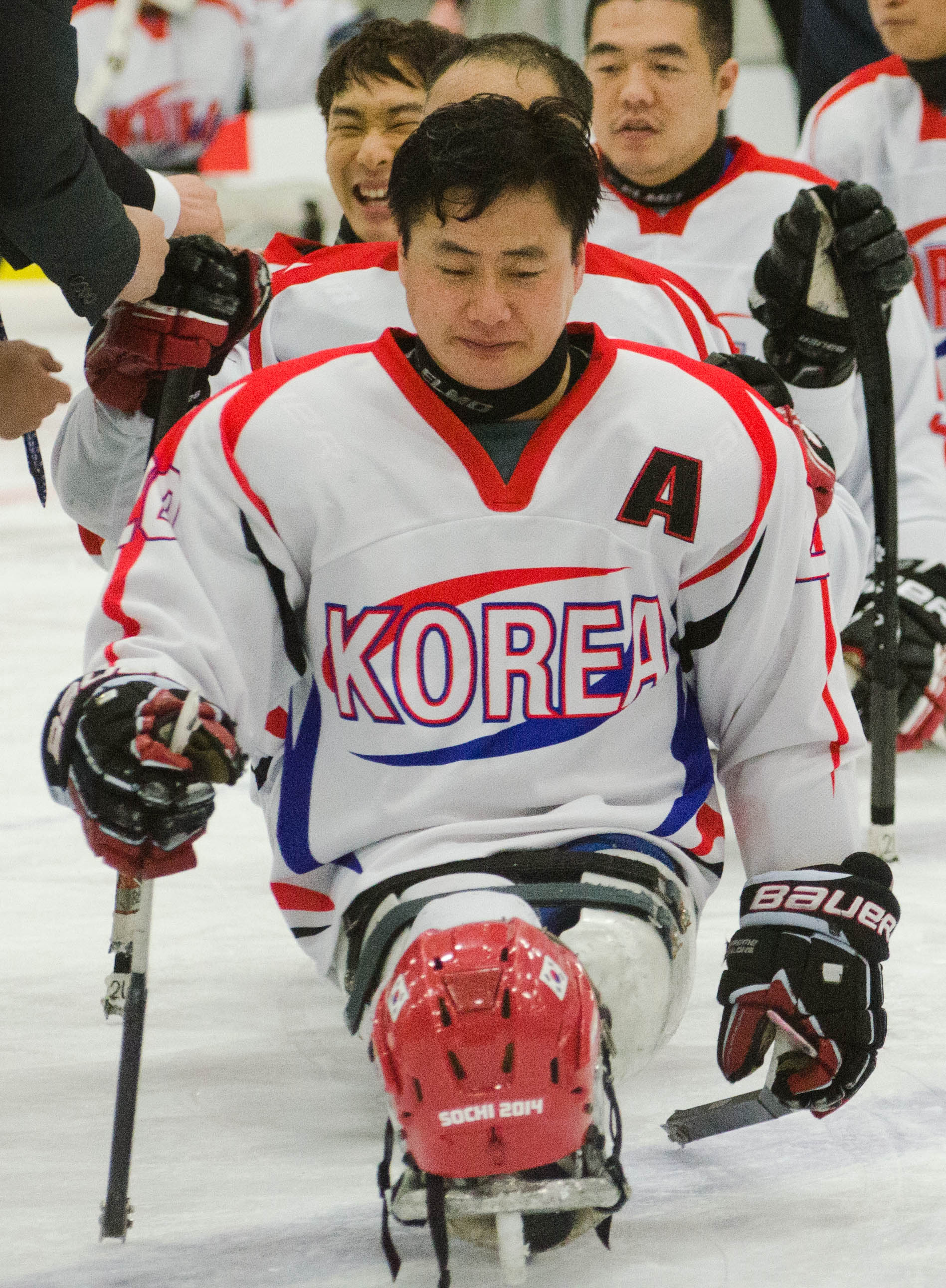
- Jang in 2015

Personal information
- Nationality: South Korea
- Born: 10 January 1976 (age 50) Dongducheon, South Korea
Medal record
Para ice hockey
Representing South Korea
Paralympic Games
Bronze medal – third place	2018 PyeongChang	Team competition
World Championships
Silver medal – second place	2012 Hamar	Team competition
Bronze medal – third place	2017 Gangneung	Team competition
Bronze medal – third place	2019 Ostrava	Team competition

Jang Dong-shin (Korean: 장동신; born 10 January 1976) is a South Korean ice sledge hockey player and wheelchair fencer.

As a sledge hockey player, he played in the 2010, 2014, 2018 and 2022 Paralympic Winter Games. He won a silver medal at the 2012 IPC Ice Sledge Hockey World Championships.
