= Per Kasperi =

Swedish ice sledge hockey player

Per Kasperi (born 20 May 1993) is a Swedish ice sledge hockey player. He plays for Nacka HI, and has spina bifida.

He represented Sweden at the 2010 Winter Paralympics, 2014 Winter Paralympics and the 2018 Winter Paralympics.
