= Shinobu Fukushima =

Japanese Paralympic sledge hockey player

Personal information
- Native name: 福島忍
- Born: December 14, 1956 (age 69) Fujieda, Shizuoka, Japan
- Height: 1.78 m (5 ft 10 in)
- Weight: 70 kg (154 lb)

Sport
- Sport: Ice sledge hockey
- Position: Goaltender
- Disability: Spinal cord injury
- Team: Nagano Thunderbirds
Medal record
Men's para ice hockey
Representing Japan
Paralympic Games
Silver medal – second place	2010 Vancouver	Team

Shinobu Fukushima (福島 忍, Fukushima Shinobu; born 14 December 1956 in Fujieda, Shizuoka Prefecture) is a Japanese ice sledge hockey goaltender. He was part of the Japanese sledge hockey team that won a silver medal at the 2010 Winter Paralympics. He competed at the 2018 Winter Olympics at age 61.

He became paralyzed following a motorcycle accident at age 24.
