= Niklas Ingvarsson =

Swedish ice sledge hockey player

Niklas Ingvarsson (born 3 June 1978) is a Swedish ice sledge hockey player. He plays for FIFH Malmö, and his leg was amputated aged 18, after he suffered from leukemia as a 10-year-old.

He took part in 1998 and 2002, where Sweden won bronze in both. He also participated in the 2010 Winter Paralympics and the 2018 Winter Paralympics.

He also has one World Championship medal; bronze from the 2004 IPC Ice Sledge Hockey World Championships.
