= 2012 IPC Ice Sledge Hockey World Championships =

Tournament details
- Host country: Norway
- Venue: Hamar Olympic Amphitheatre
- Dates: March 24 - April 1, 2012
- Teams: 8

Final positions
- Champions: United States

Tournament statistics
- Games played: 20

The 2012 IPC Ice Sledge Hockey World Championships was the sixth IPC Ice Sledge Hockey World Championships that took place in the Hamar Olympic Amphitheatre in Hamar, Norway from March 24, 2012, to April 1, 2012. It was the first time that Norway hosted the IPC Ice Sledge Hockey World Championships. In the final, the United States defeated Korea 5–1, to win their second title since 2009.

== See also ==
- 2012 Men's World Ice Hockey Championships
