= 2015 World Sledge Hockey Challenge =

Tournament details
- Host country: Canada
- Venue: Leduc Recreation Centre in Leduc, Alberta
- Dates: February 1, 2015 – February 7, 2015
- Teams: 4

Tournament statistics
- Games played: 10

The 2015 World Sledge Hockey Challenge was an international ice sledge hockey tournament organized by Hockey Canada hosted in Leduc, Alberta, from February 1–7, 2015, at the Leduc Recreation Centre. The U.S. National Sled Hockey Team defeated Russia, 2-1 to win the competition.

== Teams ==
- Canada (8th Appearance)
- Russia (2nd Appearance)
- South Korea (2nd Appearance)
- United States (8th Appearance)

== Background ==
Canada, Russia, South Korea and the United States all return.

== 2015 Tournament ==
=== Preliminary round ===
All times are local (UTC-7).

| Team | Pld | W | OTW | OTL | L | GF | GA | GD | Pts |
|---|---|---|---|---|---|---|---|---|---|
| United States | 3 | 3 | 0 | 0 | 0 | 13 | 3 | +10 | 9 |
| Canada | 3 | 2 | 0 | 0 | 1 | 10 | 2 | +8 | 6 |
| Russia | 3 | 1 | 0 | 0 | 2 | 6 | 6 | 0 | 3 |
| South Korea | 3 | 0 | 0 | 0 | 3 | 2 | 20 | −18 | 0 |

| 1 February 2015; 12:00 | Russia | 2-3 (0-1, 1-1, 1-1) | United States | Leduc Recreation Centre |

Game reference

Vladimir Kamantsev (0-1-0)
Goalies
Steve Cash (1-0-0)

| | 0-1 | 10:26 - B. Roybal (1) (N. Landeros, S. Cash) (PP) |
| | 0-2 | 22:05 - K. McKee (1) (D. Farmer, N. Landeros) |
| E. Petrov (1) (V. Varlakov, A. Amosov) - 27:21 | 1-2 |
| V. Varlakov (1) (M. Chekmarev) - 40:53 | 2-2 |
| | 2-3 | 43:15 - D. Farmer (1) (K. McKee) |

6 min
Penalties
4 min
20
Shots
20

| 1 February 2015; 17:00 | South Korea | 0-8 (0-3, 0-4, 0-1) | Canada | Leduc Recreation Centre |

Game reference

Man-Gyun Yu (0-1-0)
Goalies
Corbin Watson (1-0-0)
Dominic Larocque

| 0-1 | 7:13 - B. Bowden (1) (G. Westlake) |
| 0-2 | 7:41 - A. Dixon (1) (B. Bowden, G. Westlake) |
| 0-3 | 13:57 - M. Dorion (1) (A. Dixon) |
| 0-4 | 17:02 - B. Delaney (1) (T. McGregor) |
| 0-5 | 25:10 - T. McGregor (1) (D. Whitson, A. Dixon) (PP) |
| 0-6 | 27:32 - K. Rempel (1) (B. Bowden) |
| 0-7 | 27:51 - T. McGregor (2) |
| 0-8 | 39:08 - B. Bowden (2) (G. Westlake, D. Whitson) |

18 min
Penalties
0 min
10
Shots
25

| 2 February 2015; 12:00 | South Korea | 1-8 (0-2, 0-2, 1-4) | United States | Leduc Recreation Centre |

Game reference

Man-Gyun Yu (0-2-0)
Goalies
Steve Cash (2-0-0), Kyle Huckaby (19:41)

| | 0-1 | 0:22 - K. McKee (2) (D. Farmer) |
| | 0-2 | 9:08 - B. Roybal (2) (N. Landeros) (PP) |
| | 0-3 | 18:17 - B. Roybal (3) (D. Farmer, K. McKee) |
| | 0-4 | 21:05 - A. Page (1) (J. Pauls) |
| | 0-5 | 30:21 - J. Pauls (1) |
| | 0-6 | 31:13 - J. Pauls (2) (B. Hanning) |
| J-S Lee (1) (Y-J Cho) - 33:52 | 1-6 |
| | 1-7 | 38:00 - D. Farmer (2) (K. McKee) |
| | 1-8 | 43:03 - D. McCoy (1) (J. Misiewicz) |

8 min
Penalties
18 min
7
Shots
25

| 2 February 2015; 19:00 | Canada | 2-0 (0-0, 1-0, 1-0) | Russia | Leduc Recreation Centre |

Game reference
| Corbin Watson (2-0-0) | Goalies | Vladimir Kamantsev (0-2-0) |
G. Westlake (1) (B. Bowden) - 22:12 / 1-0; M. Dorion (2) (B. Delaney) - 43:40 / 2-0
| 8 min | Penalties | 14 min |
| 25 | Shots | 17 |

| 4 February 2015; 12:00 | Russia | 4-1 (0-0, 3-1, 1-1) | South Korea | Leduc Recreation Centre |

Game reference

Evgeny Plotnikov (1-0-0)
Goalies
Man-Gyun Yu (0-3-0)

| 18:49 - D. Lisov (1) (I. Volkov, V. Varlakov) | 1-0 |
| 23:28 - V. Selyukin (1) (A. Lysov) | 2-0 |
| | 2-1 | Y-J Cho (1) (S-H Jung, B-S Cho) - 27:04 |
| 28:16 - S. Panfilov (1) (D. Lisov, I. Volkov) (PP) | 3-1 |
| 31:11 - A. Amosov (1) (V. Litvinenko, V. Varlakov) | 4-1 |

12 min
Penalties
12 min
25
Shots
10

| 4 February 2015; 19:00 | Canada | 0-2 (0-1, 0-0, 0-1) | United States | Leduc Recreation Centre |

Game reference
| Corbin Watson (2-1-0) | Goalies | Steve Cash (3-0-0) |
0-1 / 13:48 - N. Landeros (1) (B. Roybal, D. Farmer); 0-2 / 38:51 - N. Landeros (2) (K. McKee)
| 4 min | Penalties | 2 min |
| 13 | Shots | 21 |

=== Playoff round ===
Semi-finals
4 | South Korea | 0
1 | United States | 8
3 | Russia | 2
2 | Canada | 1

Gold Medal
1 | United States | 2
3 | Russia | 1
Bronze Medal
4 | South Korea | 1
2 | Canada | 4

==== Semi-finals ====
| 5 February 2015; 14:00 | South Korea | 0-8 (0-0, 0-1, 0-7) | United States | Leduc Recreation Centre |

Game reference

Man-Gyun Yu (0-4-0)
Do-Young Shin
Goalies
Steve Cash (4-0-0)

| 0-1 | 25:24 - K. McKee (3) (N. Landeros, D. Farmer) (PP) |
| 0-2 | 34:16 - N. Landeros (3) |
| 0-3 | 34:40 - D. McCoy (2) (J. Misiewicz) |
| 0-4 | 36:11 - D. Farmer (3)(B. Roybal) |
| 0-5 | 42:55 - J. Misiewicz (1) (D. McCoy) (PP) |
| 0-6 | 43:59 - J. Misiewicz (2) |
| 0-7 | 43:59 - A. Page (2) (D. McCoy) |
| 0-8 | 44:32 - A. Page (3) |

45 min
Penalties
4 min
5
Shots
30

| 5 February 2015; 19:00 | Russia | 2-1 (1-1, 0-0, 1-0) | Canada | Leduc Recreation Centre |

Game reference

Vladimir Kamantsev (1-2-0)
Goalies
Corbin Watson (2-2-0)

| S. Panfilov (1) (I. Volkov, D. Lisov) - 1:12 | 1-0 |
| | 1-1 | 4:14 - K. Rempel (2) (K. Block) |
| I. Berdnik (1) - 44:07 | 2-1 |

14 min
Penalties
20 min
21
Shots
18

==== Bronze-medal game ====
| 7 February 2015; 12:00 | South Korea | 1-4 (1-1, 0-3, 0-0) | Canada | Leduc Recreation Centre |

Game reference

Man-Gyun Yu (0-5-0)
Goalies
Dominic Larocque (1-0-0)

| | 0-1 | 3:36 - T. McGregor (3) (K. Rempel, C. Cederstrand) |
| J-K Lee (Y-J Cho) - 13:36 | 1-1 |
| | 1-2 | 18:41 - D. Whitson (1) (A. Dixon, K. Rempel) |
| | 1-3 | 24:50 - T. McGregor (4) (B. Delaney) |
| | 1-4 | 28:40 - A. Dixon (2) (T. McGregor, K. Sorley) (PP) |

24 min
Penalties
22 min
12
Shots
21

==== Gold-medal game ====
| 7 February 2015; 17:00 | Russia | 1-2 OT (1-0, 0-1, 0-0) (OT: 0-1) | United States | Leduc Recreation Centre |

Game reference

Evgeny Plotnikov (2-0-0)
Goalies
Steve Cash (5-0-0)

| | 0-1 | 23:05 - K. McKee (3) (T. Carron) |
| I. Berdnik (2) (M. Kuzminykh) - 11:42 | 1-1 |
| | 1-2 | 45:19 - J. Pauls (3) (B. Roybal) |

2 min
Penalties
0 min
9
Shots
20

=== Final standings ===
| | Team |
|---|---|
| 1st place, gold medalist(s) | United States |
| 2nd place, silver medalist(s) | Russia |
| 3rd place, bronze medalist(s) | Canada |
| 4th | South Korea |

== Statistics ==
Scoring Leaders
| Player | Team | GP | G | A | P | PIM |
|---|---|---|---|---|---|---|
| Declan Farmer | United States | 5 | 3 | 6 | 9 | 2 |
| Nikko Landeros | United States | 5 | 3 | 5 | 8 | 0 |
| Kevin McKee | United States | 5 | 4 | 3 | 7 | 0 |
| Tyler McGregor | Canada | 5 | 4 | 2 | 6 | 8 |
| Brody Roybal | United States | 5 | 3 | 3 | 6 | 0 |
| Daniel McCoy | United States | 5 | 2 | 4 | 6 | 0 |
| Adam Dixon | Canada | 5 | 2 | 3 | 5 | 8 |
| Greg Westlake | Canada | 5 | 1 | 4 | 5 | 18 |

Top goaltenders
| Player | Team | GP | Mins | GA | SO | GAA | Sv% | Record |
|---|---|---|---|---|---|---|---|---|
| Steve Cash | United States | 5 | 205:38 | 3 | 2 | 0.66 | .936 | 5-0-0 |
| Dominic Larocque | Canada | 5 | 60:00 | 1 | 0 | 0.75 | .929 | 1-0-0 |
| Corbin Watson | Canada | 5 | 164:24 | 4 | 1 | 1.09 | .938 | 2-2-0 |
