= Czech Republic at the 2014 Winter Paralympics =

- IPC code: CZE
- NPC: Czech Paralympic Committee
- Website: www.paralympic.cz

in Sochi
- Competitors: 18 in 2 sports
- Medals: Gold 0 Silver 0 Bronze 0 Total 0

Winter Paralympics appearances (overview)
- 1994; 1998; 2002; 2006; 2010; 2014; 2018; 2022; 2026

Other related appearances
- Czechoslovakia (1976–1992)

Czech Republic competed at the 2014 Winter Paralympics in Sochi, Russia, held between 7–16 March 2014.

== Competitors ==
The following is the list of number of competitors participating at the Games per sport/discipline.

Sport	Men	Women	Total
Alpine skiing	4	0	4
Ice sledge hockey	14	0	14
Total	18	0	18

== Alpine skiing ==
Men

Athlete	Event	Run 1			Run 2			Final/Total		
Athlete	Event	Time	Diff	Rank	Time	Diff	Rank	Time	Diff	Rank
Patrik Hetmer; Guide: Miroslav Macala	Super-G, visually impaired	—N/a						DNF		
Patrik Hetmer; Guide: Miroslav Macala	Combined, visually impaired	1:14.69	+24.09	7	1:36.61	+19.15	7	2:51.30	+35.43	7
Patrik Hetmer; Guide: Miroslav Macala	Slalom, visually impaired	1:01.60	+11.91	14	1:01.87	+8.35	7	2:03.47	+20.26	8
Patrik Hetmer; Guide: Miroslav Macala	Giant slalom, visually impaired	1:29.82	+13.80	15	DNF					
Oldrich Jelinek	Super-G, sitting	—N/a						DNF		
Oldrich Jelinek	Combined, sitting	DNF								
Oldrich Jelinek	Slalom, sitting	1:03.87	+11.13	19	DNF					
Oldrich Jelinek	Giant slalom, sitting	DNF								
Stanislav Loska	Slalom, standing	59.20	+11.51	29	1:02.47	+11.19	19	2:01.67	+22.70	21
Stanislav Loska	Giant slalom, standing	DNS								

=== Snowboarding ===
Para-snowboarding is making its debut at the Winter Paralympics and it will be placed under the Alpine skiing program during the 2014 Games.

Men

Athlete	Event	Race 1		Race 2		Race 3		Total	
Athlete	Event	Time	Rank	Time	Rank	Time	Rank	Time	Rank
Tomas Vaverka	Snowboard cross	1:00.91	12	57.12	9	53.03	2	1:50.15	5

== Ice sledge hockey ==
Team

- Jiri Berger
- Erik Fojtik
- Michal Geier
- Zdenek Habl
- Miroslav Hrbek
- Libor Hulin
- Zdenek Krupicka
- Pavel Kubes
- Tomas Kvoch
- David Motycka
- David Palat
- Jiri Raul
- Zdenek Safranek
- Michal Vapenka

Summary

Key:

- OT – Overtime
- GWS – Match decided by penalty-shootout

Team	Group stage				Semifinal / Pl.	Final / BM / Pl.	
Team	Opposition Score	Opposition Score	Opposition Score	Rank	Opposition Score	Opposition Score	Rank
Czech Republic men's	Norway; L 1–2 GWS	Sweden; W 2–1 GWS	Canada; L 0–1	3	South Korea; W 2–0	Italy; W 3–0	5

Preliminaries

Pos	Team	Pld	W	OTW	OTL	L	GF	GA	GD	Pts	Qualification
1	Canada	3	3	0	0	0	15	1	+14	9	Semifinals
2	Norway	3	1	1	0	1	4	5	−1	5	Semifinals
3	Czech Republic	3	0	1	1	1	3	4	−1	3	5–8th place semifinals
4	Sweden	3	0	0	1	2	2	14	−12	1	5–8th place semifinals

Source: Sochi 2014

8 March 2014; 09:30	Czech Republic	1–2 GWS (0–0, 0–1, 1–0) (OT: 0–0) (SO: 0–1)	Norway	Shayba Arena; Attendance: 1,443

Game reference
Michal Vápenka	Goalies	Kristian Buen	Referee: (United States) Johnathan Morrison; Linesmen: (Netherlands) Louis Beelen (United States) Brian Frerichs
/ 0–1 / 24:28 – Bakke (Solberg, Bøgle); Geier (Hrbek, Šafránek) – 31:17 / 1–1			Referee: (United States) Johnathan Morrison; Linesmen: (Netherlands) Louis Beelen (United States) Brian Frerichs
Geier (miss); Berger (miss)	Shootout	Pedersen; Bakke	Referee: (United States) Johnathan Morrison; Linesmen: (Netherlands) Louis Beelen (United States) Brian Frerichs
0 min	Penalties	2 min	Referee: (United States) Johnathan Morrison; Linesmen: (Netherlands) Louis Beelen (United States) Brian Frerichs
21	Shots	14	Referee: (United States) Johnathan Morrison; Linesmen: (Netherlands) Louis Beelen (United States) Brian Frerichs

9 March 2014; 09:30	Czech Republic	2–1 GWS (0–0, 0–0, 1–1) (OT: 0–0) (SO: 0–1)	Sweden	Shayba Arena; Attendance: 2,285

Game reference
Michal Vápenka	Goalies	Ulf Nilsson	Referee: (Russia) Igor Samoylov; Linesmen: (Canada) Matthew Clark (Russia) Dmitriy Klochkov
Palát – 36:12 / 1–0; / 1–1 / 40:39 – Holm (Kasperi)			Referee: (Russia) Igor Samoylov; Linesmen: (Canada) Matthew Clark (Russia) Dmitriy Klochkov
Palát (miss); Geier (miss); Krupička	Shootout	(miss) Lundgren; (miss) Kasperi; (miss) Ingvarsson	Referee: (Russia) Igor Samoylov; Linesmen: (Canada) Matthew Clark (Russia) Dmitriy Klochkov
4 min	Penalties	4 min	Referee: (Russia) Igor Samoylov; Linesmen: (Canada) Matthew Clark (Russia) Dmitriy Klochkov
22	Shots	9	Referee: (Russia) Igor Samoylov; Linesmen: (Canada) Matthew Clark (Russia) Dmitriy Klochkov

11 March 2014; 20:00	Canada	1–0 (0–0, 1–0, 0–0)	Czech Republic	Shayba Arena; Attendance: 4,069

Game reference
Corbin Watson	Goalies	Michal Vápenka	Referee: (Russia) Igor Samoylov; Linesmen: (United States) Brian Frerichs (Russia) Sergey Yudakov
Westlake (Bridges) – 22:33 / 1–0			Referee: (Russia) Igor Samoylov; Linesmen: (United States) Brian Frerichs (Russia) Sergey Yudakov
4 min	Penalties	8 min	Referee: (Russia) Igor Samoylov; Linesmen: (United States) Brian Frerichs (Russia) Sergey Yudakov
19	Shots	7	Referee: (Russia) Igor Samoylov; Linesmen: (United States) Brian Frerichs (Russia) Sergey Yudakov

5–8 Classification Play-offs

12 March 2014; 20:00	Czech Republic	2–0 (0–0, 1–0, 1–0)	South Korea	Shayba Arena; Attendance: 4,769

Game reference
Michal Vápenka	Goalies	Yu Man-gyun	Referee: (Russia) Igor Samoylov; Linesmen: (Netherlands) Louis Beelen (Norway) Espen Nyberget
Berger (Fojtík, Šafránek) – 18:27 / 1–0; Kvoch (Kubeš) (PP) – 40:04 / 2–0			Referee: (Russia) Igor Samoylov; Linesmen: (Netherlands) Louis Beelen (Norway) Espen Nyberget
10 min	Penalties	20 min	Referee: (Russia) Igor Samoylov; Linesmen: (Netherlands) Louis Beelen (Norway) Espen Nyberget
12	Shots	19	Referee: (Russia) Igor Samoylov; Linesmen: (Netherlands) Louis Beelen (Norway) Espen Nyberget

5th Place Game

14 March 2014; 20:00	Czech Republic	3–0 (0–0, 0–0, 3–0)	Italy	Shayba Arena; Attendance: 5,398

Game reference

Michal Vápenka
Goalies
Gabriele Araudo
Referee:
(Norway) Petter Hegle
Linesmen:
(South Korea) Chae Young-jin
(Russia) Dmitriy Klochkov

Šafránek (Kubeš, Motyčka) (PP) – 31:34	1–0
Geier – 43:04	2–0
Geier (Kubeš) (ENG) – 44:48	3–0

4 min
Penalties
2 min
11
Shots
18

== See also ==
- Czech Republic at the Paralympics
- Czech Republic at the 2014 Winter Olympics
