= Ice sledge hockey at the 2014 Winter Paralympics =

2014 Winter Paralympics

Tournament details
- Host country: Russia
- Venue: Shayba Arena
- Dates: 8–15 March 2014
- Teams: 8

Final positions
- Champions: United States (3rd title)
- Runners-up: Russia
- Third place: Canada
- Fourth place: Norway

Tournament statistics
- Games played: 20
- Goals scored: 74 (3.7 per game)
- Attendance: 88,534 (4,427 per game)
- Scoring leader: (Canada) Adam Dixon (7 points)

The ice sledge hockey competition of the 2014 Winter Paralympics was held at the Shayba Arena in Sochi, Russia, from 8 to 15 March 2014. A total of eight teams competed in the mixed team tournament.

== Medalists ==
Event	Gold	Silver	Bronze
Mixed	United States Tyler Carron; Steve Cash; Taylor Chace; Declan Farmer; Nikko Landeros; Jen Lee; Taylor Lipsett; Dan McCoy; Kevin McKee; Adam Page; Josh Pauls; Rico Roman; Brody Roybal; Paul Schaus; Greg Shaw; Joshua Sweeney; Andrew Yohe	Russia Alexey Amosov; Maxim Andriyanov; Andrey Dvinyaninov; Mikhail Ivanov; Vladimir Kamantcev; Ivan Kuznetsov; Dmitry Lisov; Vladimir Litvinenko; Aleksei Lysov; Evgeny Petrov; Ilia Popov; Vadim Selyukin; Konstantin Shikhov; Nikolay Terentyev; Ruslan Tuchin; Vasily Varlakov; Ilia Volkov	Canada Steve Arsenault; Brad Bowden; Billy Bridges; Ben Delaney; Adam Dixon; Marc Dorion; Anthony Gale; James Gemmell; Dominic Larocque; Karl Ludwig; Tyler McGregor; Graeme Murray; Kevin Rempel; Benoit St-Amand; Corbin Watson; Greg Westlake; Derek Whitson

== Qualification ==
Qualifying event	Date	Venue	Vacancies	Qualified
Host nation	4 July 2007	Guatemala City	1	Russia
2013 World Championships	12–20 April 2013	(South Korea) Goyang	4	Canada; United States; Czech Republic; Norway
Paralympic Last Chance Qualification Tournament	21–26 October 2013	(Italy) Turin	3	South Korea; Italy; Sweden

== Preliminary round ==
All times are local (UTC+4).

=== Group A ===
Pos	Team	Pld	W	OTW	OTL	L	GF	GA	GD	Pts	Qualification
1	Canada	3	3	0	0	0	15	1	+14	9	Semifinals
2	Norway	3	1	1	0	1	4	5	−1	5	Semifinals
3	Czech Republic	3	0	1	1	1	3	4	−1	3	5–8th place semifinals
4	Sweden	3	0	0	1	2	2	14	−12	1	5–8th place semifinals

Source: Sochi 2014

8 March 2014; 09:30	Czech Republic	1–2 GWS (0–0, 0–1, 1–0) (OT: 0–0) (SO: 0–1)	Norway	Shayba Arena; Attendance: 1,443

Game reference
Michal Vápenka	Goalies	Kristian Buen	Referee: (United States) Johnathan Morrison; Linesmen: (Netherlands) Louis Beelen (United States) Brian Frerichs
/ 0–1 / 24:28 – Bakke (Solberg, Bøgle); Geier (Hrbek, Šafránek) – 31:17 / 1–1			Referee: (United States) Johnathan Morrison; Linesmen: (Netherlands) Louis Beelen (United States) Brian Frerichs
Geier (miss); Berger (miss)	Shootout	Pedersen; Bakke	Referee: (United States) Johnathan Morrison; Linesmen: (Netherlands) Louis Beelen (United States) Brian Frerichs
0 min	Penalties	2 min	Referee: (United States) Johnathan Morrison; Linesmen: (Netherlands) Louis Beelen (United States) Brian Frerichs
21	Shots	14	Referee: (United States) Johnathan Morrison; Linesmen: (Netherlands) Louis Beelen (United States) Brian Frerichs

8 March 2014; 13:00	Canada	10–1 (4–0, 3–0, 3–1)	Sweden	Shayba Arena; Attendance: 1,707

Game reference

Benoit St-Amand
Goalies
Ulf Nilsson
Kenth Jonsson
Referee:
(Norway) Petter Hegle
Linesmen:
(Poland) Tomasz Heltman
(Russia) Sergey Yudakov

Bridges (Whitson) – 01:03	1–0
Delaney (Gale, Murray) – 06:42	2–0
Gale (McGregor) – 12:30	3–0
Larocque (Dixon, Rempel) – 13:03	4–0
Dixon (Westlake, Dorion) – 26:47	5–0
Murray (Gale) – 27:40	6–0
Westlake (Dixon, Rempel) (PP) – 29:45	7–0
	7–1	35:22 – Kasperi (Rakos, Ingvarsson)
Dixon (Rempel, Bowden) (PP) – 40:12	8–1
Larocque (Rempel, Arsenault) – 40:32	9–1
Gale (Whitson, McGregor) – 41:30	10–1

2 min
Penalties
10 min
31
Shots
5

9 March 2014; 09:30	Czech Republic	2–1 GWS (0–0, 0–0, 1–1) (OT: 0–0) (SO: 0–1)	Sweden	Shayba Arena; Attendance: 2,285

Game reference
Michal Vápenka	Goalies	Ulf Nilsson	Referee: (Russia) Igor Samoylov; Linesmen: (Canada) Matthew Clark (Russia) Dmitriy Klochkov
Palát – 36:12 / 1–0; / 1–1 / 40:39 – Holm (Kasperi)			Referee: (Russia) Igor Samoylov; Linesmen: (Canada) Matthew Clark (Russia) Dmitriy Klochkov
Palát (miss); Geier (miss); Krupička	Shootout	(miss) Lundgren; (miss) Kasperi; (miss) Ingvarsson	Referee: (Russia) Igor Samoylov; Linesmen: (Canada) Matthew Clark (Russia) Dmitriy Klochkov
4 min	Penalties	4 min	Referee: (Russia) Igor Samoylov; Linesmen: (Canada) Matthew Clark (Russia) Dmitriy Klochkov
22	Shots	9	Referee: (Russia) Igor Samoylov; Linesmen: (Canada) Matthew Clark (Russia) Dmitriy Klochkov

9 March 2014; 13:00	Canada	4–0 (0–0, 2–0, 2–0)	Norway	Shayba Arena; Attendance: 4,879

Game reference

Corbin Watson
Goalies
Kristian Buen
Referee:
(United States) Derek Berkebile
Linesmen:
(South Korea) Chae Young-jin
(United States) Brian Frerichs

Larocque (McGregor, Gale) (PP) – 19:20	1–0
Dixon (Gale, Bridges) – 25:34	2–0
Dixon (Arsenault, Rempel) – 31:07	3–0
Dorion (Larocque, Rempel) – 44:38	4–0

6 min
Penalties
6 min
23
Shots
6

11 March 2014; 13:00	Norway	2–0 (0–0, 1–0, 1–0)	Sweden	Shayba Arena; Attendance: 4,359

Game reference
Kristian Buen; Kjell Christian Hamar	Goalies	Ulf Nilsson	Referee: (Czech Republic) Jan Vaněk; Linesmen: (South Korea) Chae Young-jin (Canada) Matthew Clark
Bøgle (Solberg) – 20:40 / 1–0; Bakke (Pedersen, Solberg) – 34:35 / 2–0			Referee: (Czech Republic) Jan Vaněk; Linesmen: (South Korea) Chae Young-jin (Canada) Matthew Clark
4 min	Penalties	6 min	Referee: (Czech Republic) Jan Vaněk; Linesmen: (South Korea) Chae Young-jin (Canada) Matthew Clark
11	Shots	7	Referee: (Czech Republic) Jan Vaněk; Linesmen: (South Korea) Chae Young-jin (Canada) Matthew Clark

11 March 2014; 20:00	Canada	1–0 (0–0, 1–0, 0–0)	Czech Republic	Shayba Arena; Attendance: 4,069

Game reference
Corbin Watson	Goalies	Michal Vápenka	Referee: (Russia) Igor Samoylov; Linesmen: (United States) Brian Frerichs (Russia) Sergey Yudakov
Westlake (Bridges) – 22:33 / 1–0			Referee: (Russia) Igor Samoylov; Linesmen: (United States) Brian Frerichs (Russia) Sergey Yudakov
4 min	Penalties	8 min	Referee: (Russia) Igor Samoylov; Linesmen: (United States) Brian Frerichs (Russia) Sergey Yudakov
19	Shots	7	Referee: (Russia) Igor Samoylov; Linesmen: (United States) Brian Frerichs (Russia) Sergey Yudakov

=== Group B ===
Pos	Team	Pld	W	OTW	OTL	L	GF	GA	GD	Pts	Qualification
1	Russia (H)	3	2	0	1	0	11	4	+7	7	Semifinals
2	United States	3	2	0	0	1	9	3	+6	6	Semifinals
3	Italy	3	1	0	0	2	3	13	−10	3	5–8th place semifinals
4	South Korea	3	0	1	0	2	4	7	−3	2	5–8th place semifinals

Source: Sochi 2014
(H) Host

8 March 2014; 16:30	United States	5–1 (1–0, 1–0, 3–1)	Italy	Shayba Arena; Attendance: 3,617

Game reference

Steve Cash
Jen Lee
Goalies
Santino Stillitano
Referee:
(Canada) Paul Boese
Linesmen:
(Canada) Matthew Clark
(Russia) Dmitriy Klochkov

Farmer (Landeros, Chace) (PP) – 13:45	1–0
Roybal (Farmer) – 26:12	2–0
Sweeney – 33:04	3–0
Roybal (Pauls, Landeros) – 40:18	4–0
	4–1	43:34 – Planker (Cavaliere)
Schaus (Landeros) – 44:55	5–1

8 min
Penalties
10 min
19
Shots
12

8 March 2014; 20:00	Russia	2–3 GWS (1–0, 1–1, 0–1) (OT: 0–0) (SO: 0–1)	South Korea	Shayba Arena; Attendance: 3,815

Game reference

Mikhail Ivanov
Goalies
Yu Man-gyun
Referee:
(United States) Derek Berkebile
Linesmen:
(Norway) Espen Nyberget
(Czech Republic) Leon Wesley

Varlakov (Amosov, Petrov) – 14:19	1–0
Petrov (Varlakov) – 29:03	2–0
	2–1	29:24 – Han (Jung, Park W.) (PP)
	2–2	32:12 – Cho B. (Jung, Park W.) (PP)

Selyukin (miss)
Lisov
Petrov
Lisov (miss)
Shootout
Cho Y.
Jung
(miss) Lee Jo.
Han
6 min
Penalties
6 min
21
Shots
9

9 March 2014; 16:30	United States	3–0 (2–0, 1–0, 0–0)	South Korea	Shayba Arena; Attendance: 5,305

Game reference

Steve Cash
Goalies
Yu Man-gyun
Referee:
(Czech Republic) Jan Vaněk
Linesmen:
(Czech Republic) Leon Wesley
(Russia) Sergey Yudakov

Chace – 00:57	1–0
Page (McCoy) – 11:51	2–0
Page (McCoy, Cash) – 29:29	3–0

6 min
Penalties
4 min
18
Shots
9

9 March 2014; 20:00	Russia	7–0 (1–0, 4–0, 2–0)	Italy	Shayba Arena; Attendance: 5,638

Game reference

Vladimir Kamantsev
Goalies
Santino Stillitano
Gabriele Araudo
Referee:
(United States) Johnathan Morrison
Linesmen:
(Netherlands) Louis Beelen
(Poland) Tomasz Heltman

Popov (Selyukin) – 12:04	1–0
Amosov (Petrov) – 18:30	2–0
Dvinyaninov (Popov, Varlakov) – 22:01	3–0
Dvinyaninov (Popov, Varlakov) – 26:25	4–0
Litvinenko (Petrov, Lysov) – 28:49	5–0
Dvinyaninov (Petrov) (PP) – 31:20	6–0
Volkov (Dvinyaninov, Litvinenko) (PP) – 38:38	7–0

2 min
Penalties
4 min
10
Shots
13

11 March 2014; 09:30	South Korea	1–2 (0–1, 0–0, 1–1)	Italy	Shayba Arena; Attendance: 3,889

Game reference

Yu Man-gyun
Goalies
Gabriele Araudo
Referee:
(Canada) Paul Boese
Linesmen:
(Russia) Dmitriy Klochkov
(Norway) Espen Nyberget

	0–1	09:55 – Macri (Leperdi)
Jung – 35:06	1–1
	1–2	35:53 – Planker (Chiarotti)

2 min
Penalties
4 min
10
Shots
13

11 March 2014; 16:30	United States	1–2 (0–1, 0–1, 1–0)	Russia	Shayba Arena; Attendance: 5,765

Game reference

Steve Cash
Goalies
Vladimir Kamantsev
Referee:
(Norway) Petter Hegle
Linesmen:
(Netherlands) Louis Beelen
(Czech Republic) Leon Wesley

	0–1	11:57 – Volkov (Kuznetsov, Lisov) (PP2)
	0–2	17:37 – Shikhov (Varlakov)
Page (Landeros, Yohe) – 34:50	1–2

6 min
Penalties
6 min
23
Shots
10

== Classification round ==
=== 5–8th place semifinals ===
12 March 2014; 16:00	Italy	3–2 OT (0–1, 0–1, 2–0) (OT: 1–0)	Sweden	Shayba Arena; Attendance: 4,720

Game reference

Santino Stillitano
Gabriele Araudo
Goalies
Ulf Nilsson
Referee:
(United States) Derek Berkebile
Linesmen:
(Poland) Tomasz Heltman
(Czech Republic) Leon Wesley

	0–1	13:58 – Kasperi (From)
	0–2	29:00 – Kasperi (Ingvarsson, Holm) (PP2)
Rosa (Planker) – 33:00	1–2
Leperdi (Cavaliere, Rosa) (EA) – 42:45	2–2
Cavaliere (Planker) – 50:28	3–2

4 min
Penalties
4 min
34
Shots
11

12 March 2014; 20:00	Czech Republic	2–0 (0–0, 1–0, 1–0)	South Korea	Shayba Arena; Attendance: 4,769

Game reference
Michal Vápenka	Goalies	Yu Man-gyun	Referee: (Russia) Igor Samoylov; Linesmen: (Netherlands) Louis Beelen (Norway) Espen Nyberget
Berger (Fojtík, Šafránek) – 18:27 / 1–0; Kvoch (Kubeš) (PP) – 40:04 / 2–0			Referee: (Russia) Igor Samoylov; Linesmen: (Netherlands) Louis Beelen (Norway) Espen Nyberget
10 min	Penalties	20 min	Referee: (Russia) Igor Samoylov; Linesmen: (Netherlands) Louis Beelen (Norway) Espen Nyberget
12	Shots	19	Referee: (Russia) Igor Samoylov; Linesmen: (Netherlands) Louis Beelen (Norway) Espen Nyberget

=== Seventh place game ===
14 March 2014; 13:00	South Korea	2–0 (1–0, 1–0, 0–0)	Sweden	Shayba Arena; Attendance: 4,832

Game reference
Yu Man-gyun	Goalies	Ulf Nilsson	Referee: (Czech Republic) Jan Vaněk; Linesmen: (Poland) Tomasz Heltman (Norway) Espen Nyberget
Jang D. (Cho Y., Lee Jo.) (PP) – 10:06 / 1–0; Jung (Cho Y.) – 18:16 / 2–0			Referee: (Czech Republic) Jan Vaněk; Linesmen: (Poland) Tomasz Heltman (Norway) Espen Nyberget
4 min	Penalties	6 min	Referee: (Czech Republic) Jan Vaněk; Linesmen: (Poland) Tomasz Heltman (Norway) Espen Nyberget
28	Shots	6	Referee: (Czech Republic) Jan Vaněk; Linesmen: (Poland) Tomasz Heltman (Norway) Espen Nyberget

=== Fifth place game ===
14 March 2014; 20:00	Czech Republic	3–0 (0–0, 0–0, 3–0)	Italy	Shayba Arena; Attendance: 5,398

Game reference

Michal Vápenka
Goalies
Gabriele Araudo
Referee:
(Norway) Petter Hegle
Linesmen:
(South Korea) Chae Young-jin
(Russia) Dmitriy Klochkov

Šafránek (Kubeš, Motyčka) (PP) – 31:34	1–0
Geier – 43:04	2–0
Geier (Kubeš) (ENG) – 44:48	3–0

4 min
Penalties
2 min
11
Shots
18

== Medal round ==
=== Semifinals ===
13 March 2014; 13:00	Russia	4–0 (2–0, 0–0, 2–0)	Norway	Shayba Arena; Attendance: 5,246

Game reference

Vladimir Kamantsev
Goalies
Kristian Buen
Referee:
(United States) Jonhnathan Morrison
Linesmen:
(Canada) Matthew Clark
(United States) Brian Frerichs

Lisov (Shikhov) – 05:40	1–0
Amosov (Shikhov, Dvinyaninov) – 12:55	2–0
Terentyev (Shikhov) – 34:27	3–0
Petrov (Kuznetsov) (ENG) – 44:23	4–0

4 min
Penalties
6 min
20
Shots
6

13 March 2014; 20:00	Canada	0–3 (0–2, 0–1, 0–0)	United States	Shayba Arena; Attendance: 5,150

Game reference

Corbin Watson
Goalies
Steve Cash
Referee:
(Canada) Paul Boese
Linesmen:
(Russia) Dmitriy Klochkov
(Russia) Sergey Yudakov

0–1	09:12 – Farmer (Pauls, Landeros)
0–2	14:04 – Farmer (Chace)
0–3	19:55 – Pauls (Farmer)

4 min
Penalties
6 min
11
Shots
10

=== Bronze medal game ===
15 March 2014; 13:00	Canada	3–0 (0–0, 3–0, 0–0)	Norway	Shayba Arena; Attendance: 4,823

Game reference

Corbin Watson
Goalies
Kristian Buen
Referee:
(United States) Jonhnathan Morrison
Linesmen:
(United States) Brian Frerichs
(Russia) Sergey Yudakov

Bowden (Arsenault) – 15:30	1–0
Bridges (Westlake, Bowden) – 17:22	2–0
Bridges (Dixon, Bowden) (PP) – 21:42	3–0

6 min
Penalties
10 min
18
Shots
10

=== Gold medal game ===
15 March 2014; 20:00	United States	1–0 (0–0, 1–0, 0–0)	Russia	Shayba Arena; Attendance: 6,825

Game reference
Steve Cash	Goalies	Vladimir Kamantsev	Referee: (Canada) Paul Boese; Linesmen: (Canada) Matthew Clark (Czech Republic) Leon Wesley
Sweeney – 24:28 / 1–0			Referee: (Canada) Paul Boese; Linesmen: (Canada) Matthew Clark (Czech Republic) Leon Wesley
4 min	Penalties	2 min	Referee: (Canada) Paul Boese; Linesmen: (Canada) Matthew Clark (Czech Republic) Leon Wesley
4	Shots	6	Referee: (Canada) Paul Boese; Linesmen: (Canada) Matthew Clark (Czech Republic) Leon Wesley

== Final ranking ==
Pos	Grp	Team	Pld	W	OTW	OTL	L	GF	GA	GD	Pts
1st place, gold medalist(s)	B	United States	5	4	0	0	1	13	3	+10	12
2nd place, silver medalist(s)	B	Russia (H)	5	3	0	1	1	15	5	+10	10
3rd place, bronze medalist(s)	A	Canada	5	4	0	0	1	18	4	+14	12
4	A	Norway	5	1	1	0	3	4	12	−8	5
5	A	Czech Republic	5	2	1	1	1	8	4	+4	9
6	B	Italy	5	1	1	0	3	6	18	−12	5
7	B	South Korea	5	1	1	0	3	6	9	−3	5
8	A	Sweden	5	0	0	2	3	4	19	−15	2

Source: Sochi 2014
(H) Host

== Statistics ==
=== Scoring leaders ===
List shows the top ten skaters sorted by points, then goals.

Player	GP	G	A	Pts	+/−	PIM	POS
(Canada) Adam Dixon	5	4	3	7	+8	4	F
(Canada) Anthony Gale	5	2	4	6	+2	4	D
(Russia) Evgeny Petrov	5	2	4	6	+6	2	F
(Canada) Kevin Rempel	5	0	6	6	+3	4	F
(Russia) Andrey Dvinyaninov	4	3	2	5	+4	2	F
(Canada) Billy Bridges	5	3	2	5	+5	4	F
(United States) Declan Farmer	5	3	2	5	+4	0	F
(Russia) Vasily Varlakov	5	1	4	5	+9	2	D
(United States) Nikko Landeros	5	0	5	5	+7	0	D
(Sweden) Per Kasperi	5	3	1	4	–10	6	F
(Canada) Dominic Larocque	5	3	1	4	+4	0	F

GP = Games played; G = Goals; A = Assists; Pts = Points; +/− = Plus/minus; PIM = Penalties in minutes; POS = Position

=== Leading goaltenders ===
Only the top five goaltenders, based on save percentage, who have played at least 40% of their team's minutes, are included in this list.

Player	TOI	GA	GAA	SA	Sv%	SO
(United States) Steve Cash	220:06	2	0.41	45	95.56	3
(Russia) Vladimir Kamantsev	180:00	2	0.50	42	95.24	2
(Czech Republic) Michal Vápenka	235:00	4	0.77	79	94.94	2
(Canada) Corbin Watson	179:10	3	0.75	33	90.91	3
(Norway) Kristian Buen	225:42	11	2.19	88	87.50	0

TOI = Time on ice (minutes:seconds); GA = Goals against; GAA = Goals against average; SA = Shots against; Sv% = Save percentage; SO = Shutouts
