= Steve Arsenault =

Canadian ice sledge hockey player

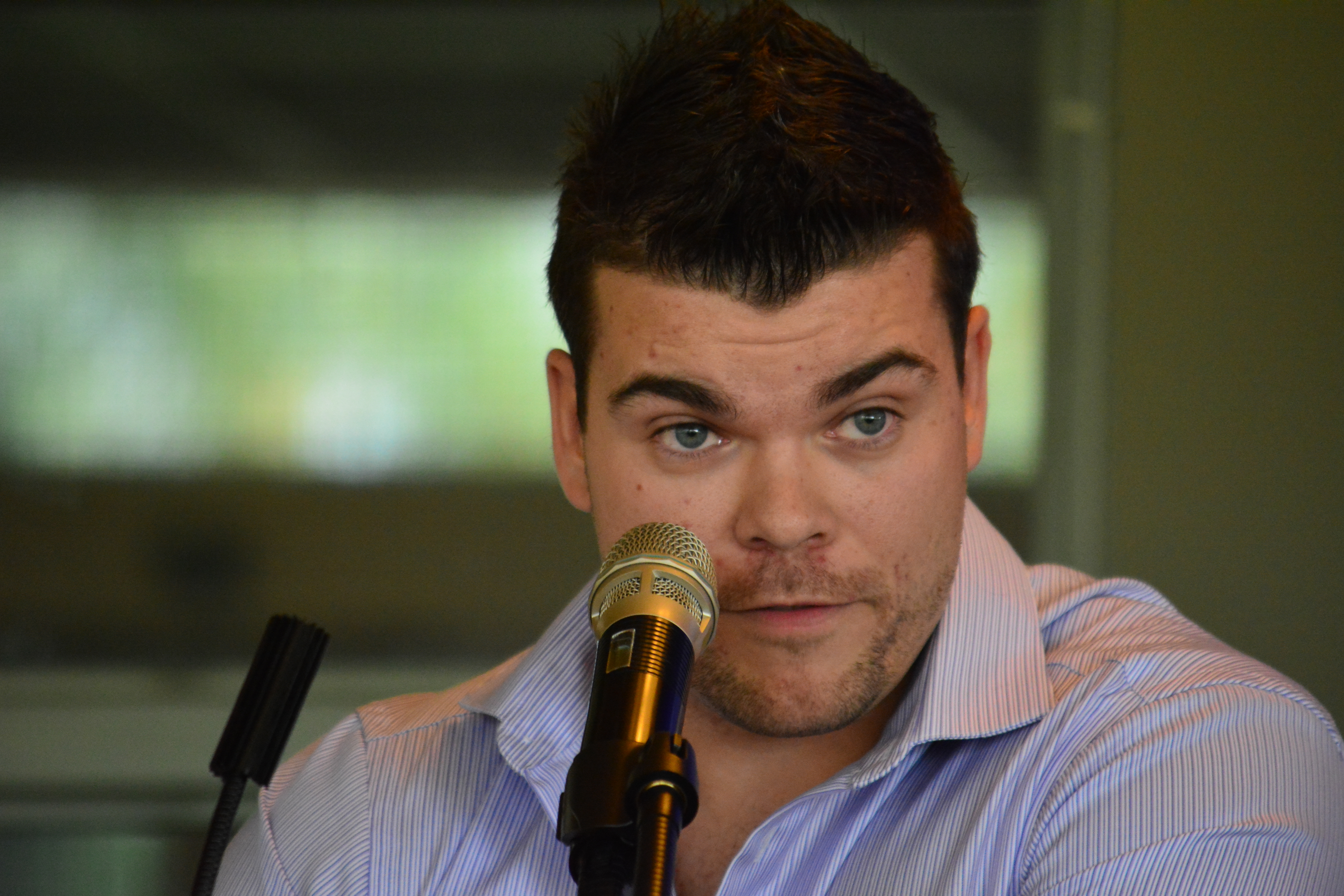
- Arsenault in 2013
- Born: September 6, 1988 (age 38) Hamilton, Ontario, Canada
- Height: 5 ft 7 in (170 cm)
- Weight: 167 lb (76 kg; 11 st 13 lb)
- Position: Defence
- Playing career: 2004–present
Medal record
Para ice hockey
Representing Canada
Paralympic Games
Silver medal – second place	2018 Pyeongchang	Team
Bronze medal – third place	2014 Sochi	Team
World Championships
Gold medal – first place	2013 Goyang	Team
Gold medal – first place	2017 Gangneung	Team
Silver medal – second place	2015 Buffalo	Team

Stephen Arsenault (born September 6, 1988) is a Canadian ice sledge hockey player.

Arsenault was born in Hamilton, Ontario to Joe and Jill Arsenault. He has avascular necrosis of the femoral head.

He began his sledge hockey career in 2004 in Edmonton with the Paralympic Sports Association Dogs. He also played for the Edmonton Impact sledge hockey team. He took a hiatus from sledge hockey from 2007 to 2010, a timespan in which his mother died and his father was seriously injured in a workplace accident which resulted in amputation of a leg.

With the Canada men's national ice sledge hockey team, He won a gold medal at the IPC Ice Sledge Hockey World Championships in 2011, 2013, 2017 and a silver in 2012. He also competed in the Sochi 2014 Winter Paralympics with the Canadian national team, winning a bronze in the sledge hockey tournament.

name="paralympicbio" />[5] He is no longer a personal trainer.[6]
