= Anthony Gale (sledge hockey) =

Canadian ice sledge hockey player

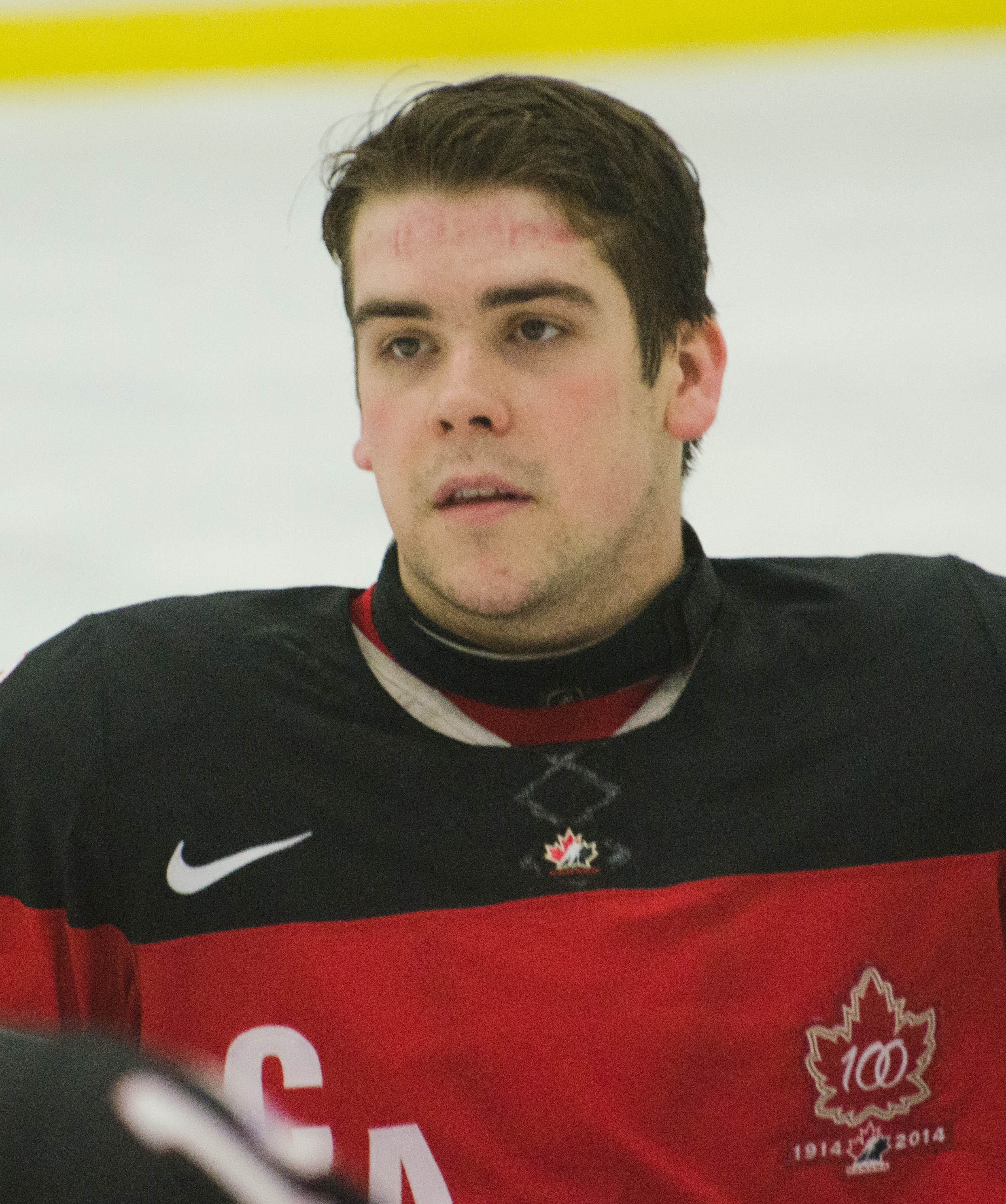
- Gale in 2015
- Born: 12 May 1993 (age 33) Toronto, Ontario, Canada
- Height: 5 ft 0 in (152 cm)
- Weight: 136 lb (62 kg; 9 st 10 lb)
- Position: Forward
- Playing career: c. 2000–present
Medal record
Para ice hockey
Representing Canada
Paralympic Games
| Bronze medal – third place | 2014 Sochi | Team |
IPC World Men Championships
| Gold medal – first place | 2013 Goyang | Team |

Anthony Gale (born 12 May 1993) is a Canadian ice sledge hockey player.

Born in Toronto in 1993 to Tony and Anna Gale with spina bifida, Gale began playing sledge hockey around 2000 at the age of seven, with the Halton Peel Cruisers Sports for the Physically Disabled. He played with their junior and intermediate sledge hockey teams, winning their MVP award in 2004 and 2005 and captaining the junior team. With the Cruisers, he also played wheelchair basketball. Gale was named to Canada men's national ice sledge hockey team in 2010 at the age of 17. He won a gold medal with the team at the 2013 IPC Ice Sledge Hockey World Championships. He won a bronze medal at the Sochi 2014 Winter Paralympics in the men's ice sledge hockey tournament.

He is an alumnus of St. Thomas Aquinas Secondary School in Brampton.
