= Karl Ludwig (sledge hockey) =

Canadian ice sledge hockey player

- Born: November 25, 1988 (age 37) Brampton, Ontario, Canada
- Height: 4 ft 10 in (147 cm)
- Weight: 130 lb (59 kg; 9 st 4 lb)
- Position: Forward
- National team: Canada
- Playing career: 2010–present
Medal record
Para ice hockey
Representing Canada
Paralympic Games
| Bronze medal – third place | 2014 Sochi | Team |
World Championships
| Gold medal – first place | 2013 Goyang | Team |

Karl Ludwig (born November 25, 1988) is a Canadian ice sledge hockey player. He won a bronze medal at the 2014 Winter Paralympics in Sochi, Russia.

== Personal life ==
Started playing sledge hockey in 1995 with the Halton-Peel Cruisers.

He attended Humber College in Toronto from 2006-2008 for Tourism Management and again from 2011-2013 for Comedy Writing and Performance.

== Career ==
Ludwig won a gold medal at the 2013 IPC Ice Sledge Hockey World Championships and won a bronze medal at the 2014 Winter Paralympics in Sochi, Russia.
