= Paul Schaus =

American ice sledge hockey player and Purple Heart recipient

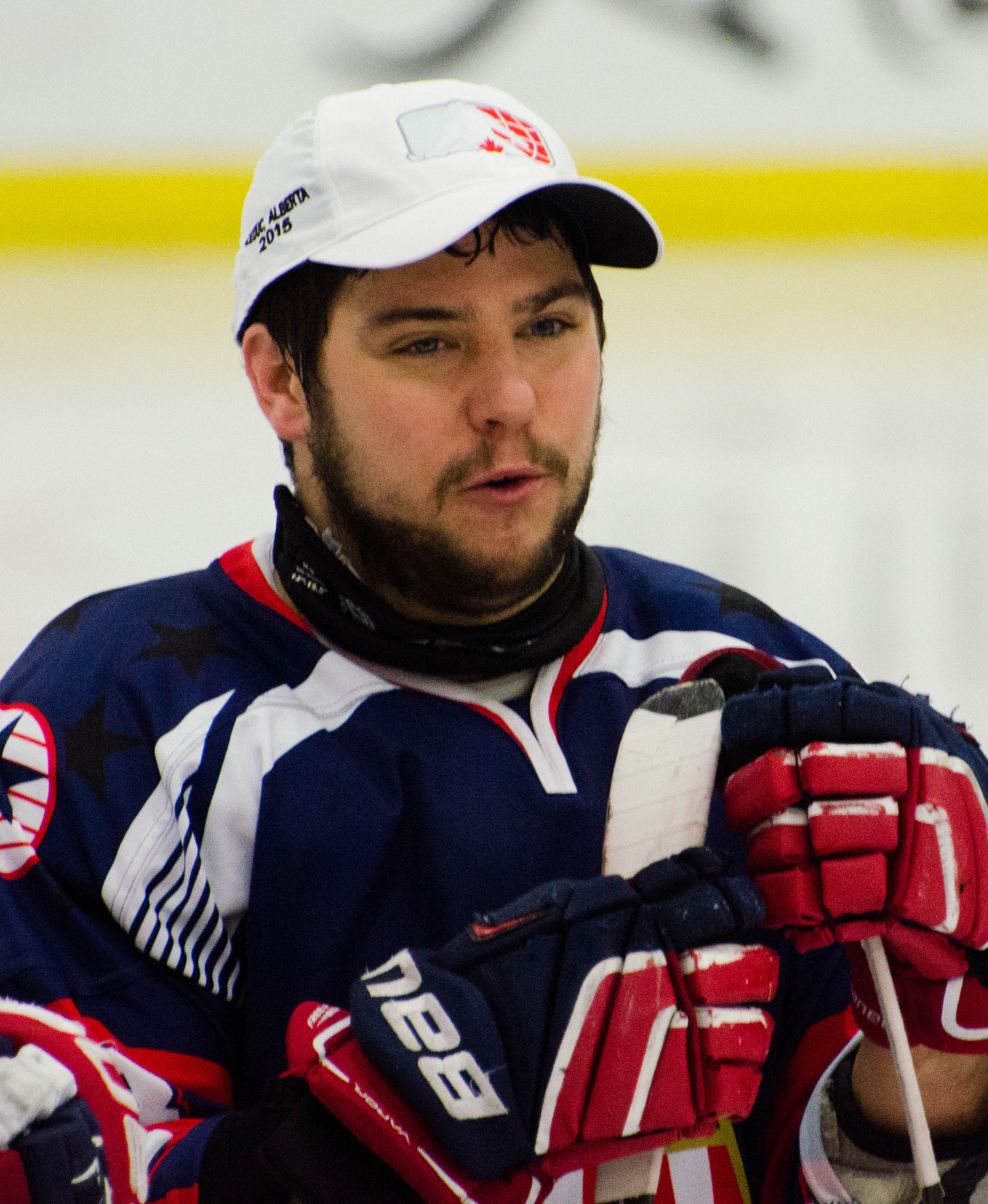
- Schaus in 2015

Personal information
- Nationality: United States
- Born: November 8, 1988 (age 37) North Tonawanda, New York, U.S.
- Education: Kenmore West Senior High School
- Height: 5 ft 7 in (170 cm)
- Weight: 155 lb (70 kg)
- Military career
- Allegiance: United States of America
- Branch: United States Marine Corps
- Service years: 2006–2011
- Rank: Corporal
- Unit: 2nd Battalion 3rd Marines
- Conflicts: Global War on Terrorism: Iraq War; Operation Enduring Freedom; War in Afghanistan (WIA)
- Awards: Purple Heart; Combat Action Ribbon

Sport
- Club: Buffalo Sabres
Medal record
Para ice hockey
Representing United States
Paralympic Games
Gold medal – first place	2014 Sochi	Team competition
World Championships
Gold medal – first place	2012 Hamar	Team competition
Gold medal – first place	2015 Buffalo	Team competition
Silver medal – second place	2013 Goyang	Team competition
Silver medal – second place	2017 Gangneung	Team competition
USA Hockey Sled Cup
Gold medal – first place	2013	Team competition

Paul Schaus (born November 8, 1988) is an American gold medal ice sledge hockey player and Purple Heart recipient from Buffalo, New York.

== Early life ==
Schaus attended Kenmore West High School, and graduated class of 2006. Following graduation, he enlisted in the United States Marine Corps

== Military life ==
In 2008, Schaus unit was deployed to Iraq where he was assigned the role of a fireteam scout/rifleman. Following the 8-month tour in Iraq, the following year his unit was deployed to Helmand Province, Afghanistan where Schaus was assigned the role of a Fireteam team leader.

=== Injury ===
On June 5, 2009, Lance Corporal Schaus's unit was sent to protect another squad as they set out to destroy an enemy bunker. During that time, his squad came under fire with mortar & small arms fire. In response, Schaus's squad engaged the enemy,As Schaus took his team to check their flank for enemy movement he stepped on an IED which tore his legs and severed his left ring finger.

He was evacuated to Camp Leatherneck where while there, he went into cardiac arrest twice. He was then evacuated to Landstuhl, Germany. He was transferred to Bethesda Naval Medical Center and shortly, Walter Reed National Military Medical Center where subsequently, he had both legs amputated above the knee. As a result of his actions, Schaus was awarded the Purple Heart and was discharged from the military in 2011.

== Hockey career ==
From 2010 to 2012 seasons he served on USA Warriors team and from 2011 to 2012 served on Buffalo Sabres which team due to his help won two champion titles in a row. In 2013 he won silver medal in the IPC Ice Sledge Hockey World Championship and then won another one in its Challenge, prior to which he won gold there too in 2012. His first Paralympic games were 2014 Winter Paralympics in Sochi, Russia where he won a gold medal.
