= Aleksei Lysov =

Aleksei Lysov may refer to:

- Aleksei Lysov (sledge hockey)
- Aleksey Lysov (footballer)
