= Adam Dixon =

Canadian ice sledge hockey player

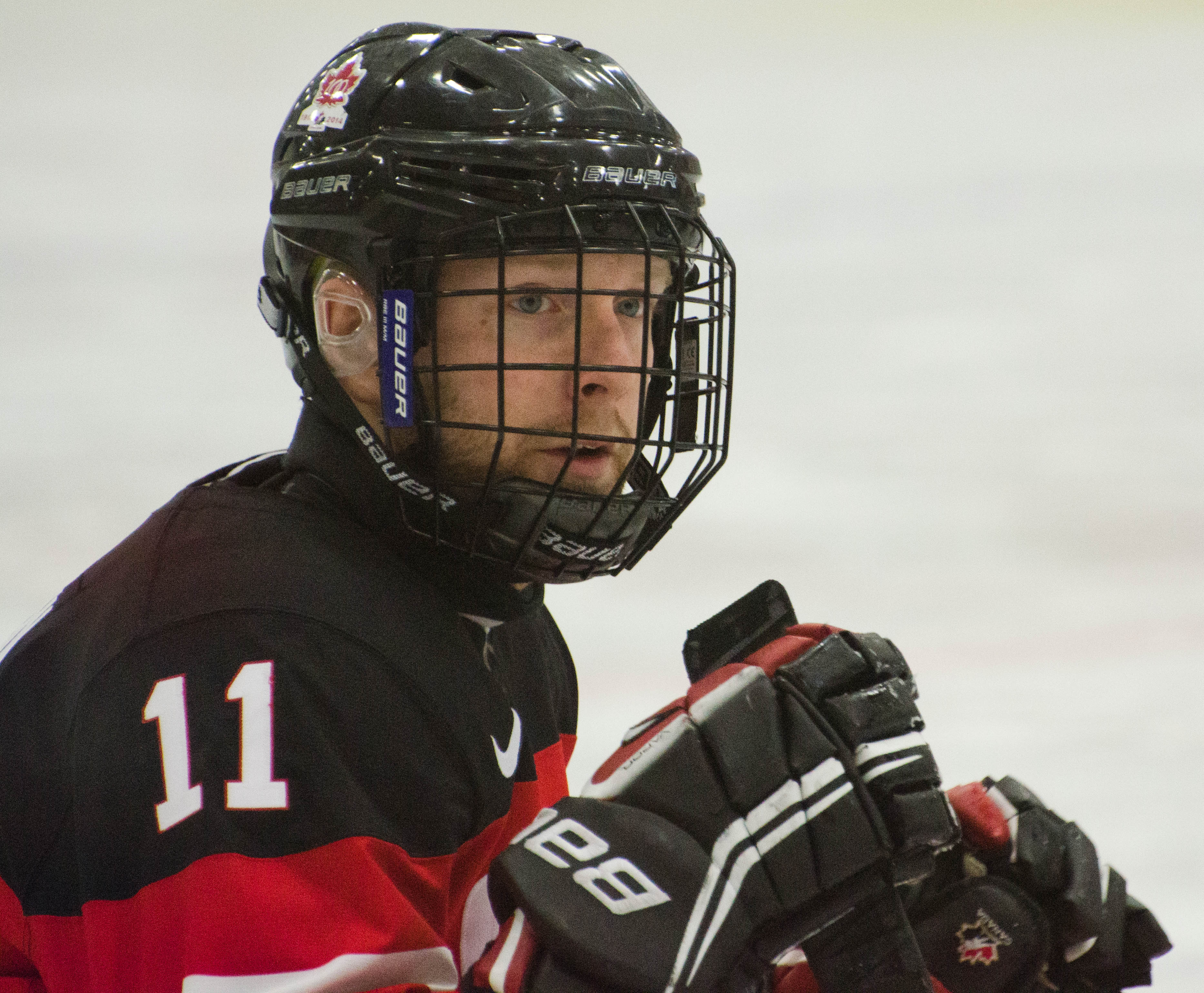
- Dixon in 2015
- Born: August 13, 1989 (age 37) Midland, Ontario, Canada
- Height: 5 ft 10 in (178 cm)
- Weight: 168 lb (76 kg; 12 st 0 lb)
- Position: Defence
- National team: Canada
- Playing career: 2007–present
Medal record
Para ice hockey
Representing Canada
Paralympic Games
Silver medal – second place	2018 Pyeongchang	Team
Silver medal – second place	2022 Beijing	Team
Silver medal – second place	2026 Milano Cortina	Team
Bronze medal – third place	2014 Sochi	Team
World Championships
Gold medal – first place	2008 Marlborough	Team
Gold medal – first place	2013 Goyang	Team
Gold medal – first place	2017 Gangneung	Team
Gold medal – first place	2024 Calgary	Team competition
Silver medal – second place	2015 Buffalo	Team
Silver medal – second place	2023 Moose Jaw	Team
Silver medal – second place	2025 Buffalo	Team
Bronze medal – third place	2009 Ostrava	Team
Bronze medal – third place	2012 Hamar	Team

Adam Dixon (born August 13, 1989) is a Canadian ice sledge hockey player.

== Life and career ==
Born in Midland, Ontario, Dixon was diagnosed with Ewing's sarcoma in his right tibia in 1999 at the age of 10 and underwent a 10-hour surgery to remove the tumor and part of his tibia. After this surgery Dixon was unable to play able-bodied hockey and was introduced to sledge hockey at the age of 11. Dixon played 6 years with the Elmvale Bears and at the age of 17 was invited to try out for the Canadian National Sledge hockey team. At the conclusion of the tryout Dixon was asked to join the team for the 2006/2007 season. Dixon continues to play defence for the team and was a member of the 2007/2008 team that won gold at 2008 IPC Ice Sledge Hockey World Championships and was named the Defensive M.V.P. of the tournament.

He competed at the 2026 Winter Paralympics and won a silver medal, Canada's third consecutive silver medal in Para ice hockey at the Winter Paralympics.

== Career statistics ==
=== International ===
Year	Team	Comp	GP	G	A	Pts	PIM
2008	Canada	ISHWC	6	5	0	5	0
2009	Canada	ISHWC	5	3	2	5	0
TOTALS		ISHWC	11	8	2	10	0
