= Ilia Volkov =

Russian ice hockey player

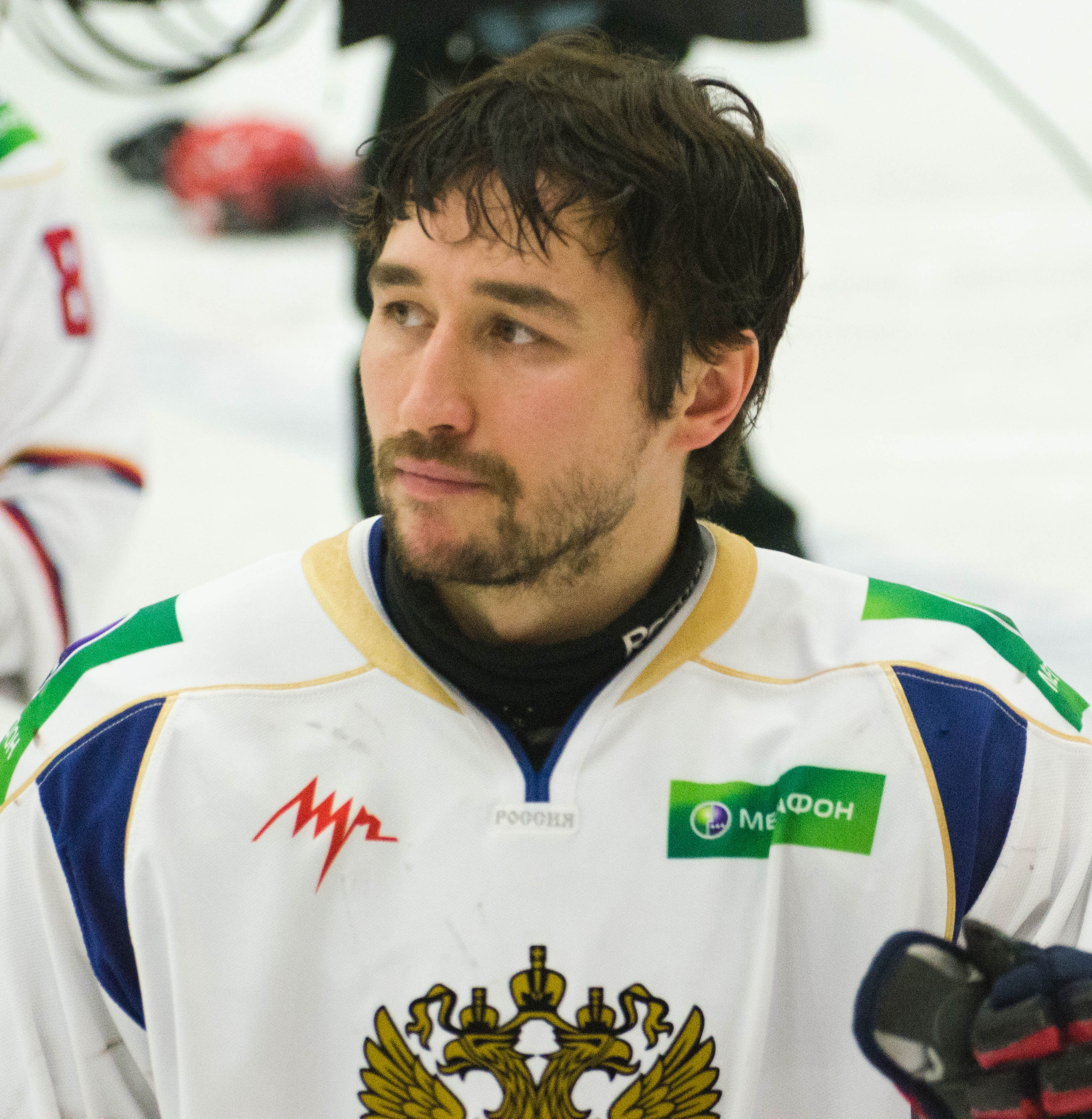
- Volkov in 2015

Personal information
- Nationality: Russia
- Born: 4 September 1985 (age 40)
Medal record
Para ice hockey
Representing Russia
Paralympic Games
| Silver medal – second place | 2014 Sochi | Team competition |
World Championships
| Bronze medal – third place | 2013 Goyang | Team competition |
| Bronze medal – third place | 2015 Buffalo | Team competition |
European Championships
| Gold medal – first place | 2016 Östersund | Team competition |
Representing RPC
World Championships
| Bronze medal – third place | 2021 Ostrava | Team competition |

Ilia Volkov (born 4 September 1985) is a Russian sledge hockey player. In 2013 he and his team won the bronze medal at the IPC Ice Sledge Hockey World Championships which were hosted in Goyang, South Korea. In the 2014 Winter Paralympics, he won the silver medal with Russia.
