= St. Thomas Aquinas Secondary School (Brampton) =

Catholic school in Brampton, Canada

Coordinates: 43.73895°N 79.71077°W

St. Thomas Aquinas Catholic Secondary School

Location
- 25 Corporation Drive; Brampton, Ontario, L65 6A2; Canada (43.7388705, -79.7107028)

Information
- School type: Separate secondary school
- Motto: Faith, Hope, Love
- Religious affiliation: Roman Catholic
- Founded: 1974, (Relocated 1992)
- School board: Dufferin-Peel Catholic District School Board (DPCDSB)
- Superintendent: Brian Diogo
- Area trustee: Shawn Xaviour, Anisha Thomas
- Principal: Peter Petruccelli
- Grades: 9 to 12
- Language: English
- Campus: Suburban / Industrial
- Area: Bramalea Neighborhood, in Brampton, Ontario
- Colours: Red and Black
- Mascot: Cardy The Cardinal (Northern Cardinal)
- Team name: Aquinas
- Website: www.dpcdsb.org/aquin
- Last updated: May 2024

St. Thomas Aquinas or STA is a Catholic secondary school in Bramalea, Brampton, Ontario. It is under Dufferin-Peel Catholic District School Board. The school's principal is Peter Petruccelli.

== History ==
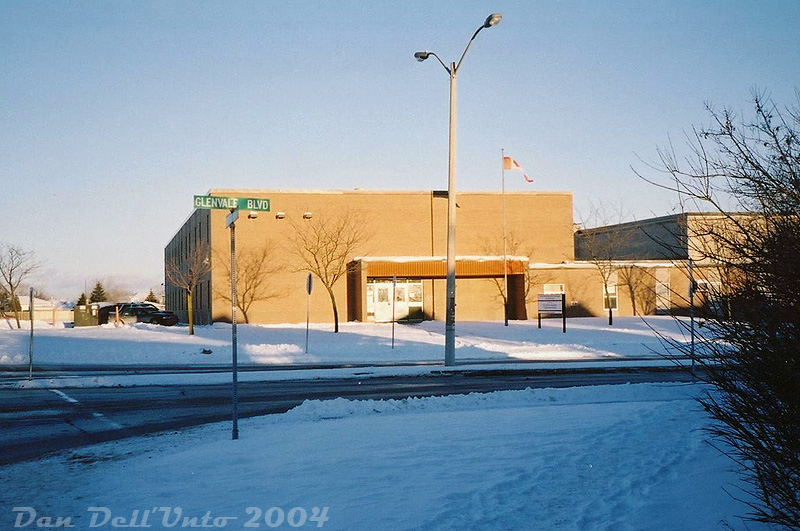
Original location of St. Thomas Aquinas CSS on Glenvale Blvd

St. Thomas Aquinas Secondary School, one of the oldest school communities in Brampton, originally occupied a new building at 115 Glenvale Boulevard (built in the Bramalea G-section in 1975), opening for classes in September 1976 with an enrolment of 500 students and offering Grades 7-10 (by 1982 Grades 9-13 were offered). A "portapak" addition was built in the Fall of 1980 on the south side of the building, and increasing amounts of portables were also added to handle increasing enrolment over the years.

The school changed locations to its current building at 25 Corporation Dr. near Torbram in 1992, due to increasing student enrolment. The old building at 115 Glenvale became a holding school, housing the new regional school for the north region, Robert F. Hall Catholic Secondary School and eventually housing St. Marguerite d'Youville SS for a number of years. It is currently the home of Holy Name of Mary CSS.

The present 3-story, 17 acre location at 25 Corporation Dr. went through renovations to add the "new section" in 2001. The section consists of English classes and the Brian J. Dunn theatre.

In 2024, the Ontario Labour Relations Board ruled against a teacher who had refused to resume teaching at St. Thomas Aquinas following a physical altercation with a student.

== Regional centre for the arts ==
St. Thomas Aquinas C.S.S offers a comprehensive educational experience by integrating both the Regional Arts Program (RAP) and Career and Technical Education (CTE) through its Specialist High Skills Major (SHSM) programs. It is one of two secondary schools with an arts program under Dufferin-Peel Catholic District School Board.

Regional Arts Program (RAP)

The RAP at St. Thomas Aquinas provides students with in-depth training in various artistic disciplines, including drama, dance, vocal and instrumental music, and visual arts. Students engage in a rigorous curriculum that emphasizes creativity, self-expression, and artistic excellence. Admission to the program requires an audition process, ensuring that students are committed and passionate about their chosen art form.

Career and Technical Education (CTE) through SHSM

Complementing the arts, the school offers SHSM programs that allow students to focus on specific economic sectors while fulfilling their Ontario Secondary School Diploma requirements. These programs provide sector-recognized certifications and real-world experiences through cooperative education placements. At St. Thomas Aquinas, SHSM offerings include Construction & Carpentry, Information & Communication Technology (ICT), and Health Care & Medical Technologies.

Technological Education Program

St. Thomas Aquinas also offers a Technological Education program, providing students with hands-on learning experiences in various technical fields. The program includes courses in Communications Technology, Construction Technology, Hospitality and Tourism, Manufacturing Technology, and Transportation Technology. These courses are designed to equip students with practical skills and knowledge applicable to real-world careers.

== School uniform ==
St. Thomas Aquinas requires all students to wear the school uniform, which consists of a red golf shirt with school emblem or a dry fit long sleeve golf shirt with the school emblem with black pants.

== Chaplaincy ==
St. Thomas Aquinas Catholic Secondary School includes a chapel, and the chaplain is Olivia Novak. The designated parish of the school is St. Anthony of Padua Catholic Church.

== Athletics ==
The mascot of the athletics teams is Cardy The Cardinal. St. Thomas Aquinas is home to a variety of team-associated sports, including: Ice Hockey, Volleyball, Basketball, Baseball, Softball, Rugby, Soccer, Badminton, and Track and field.

== Facilities ==
Facilities include:

- 130-seat theater
- Triple gymnasium
- Full weight room
- Culinary Arts Kitchen
- Library
- Chapel
- Cafeteria (nicknamed the "cafetorium" because of its partial auditorium) and Servery
- Dance studio
- Various classrooms specially equipped as cosmetics, science and computer labs
- Track field with soccer goals
- 3 separate parking lots (one typically for teachers only)

== Clubs At Aquinas ==
- Chaplaincy Club
- Chess Club
- Debate Club
- Eco Club
- Hosa Health Sciences Club
- Robotics
- SR. Science Club

== Notable alumni ==
- Anthony Gale, Olympic Sledge Hockey, Bronze Medalist, 2014. (Attended: 2007-2011)
- Luciano Borsato, former professional NHL hockey player (Attended: 1980-1984)
- Sean Monahan, NHL hockey player who currently plays for the Columbus Blue Jackets (Attended: 2008-2012)
- David J. Phillips, actor/producer in Hollywood. (Attended: 1993-1997)
- Jessie Reyez, singer/songwriter (Attended: 2004-2008)
- Alyssa Reid, singer/songwriter
- Kwasi Poku, Footballer who currently plays for Forge FC in the Canadian Premier League
- Lowell Wright, Footballer who currently plays for York United in the Canadian Premier League
- Ezequiel Carrasco, Footballer
- Jason Collett, singer-songwriter formerly of Broken Social Scene

== See also ==
- Education in Ontario
- List of secondary schools in Ontario
