= 2015 IPC Ice Sledge Hockey World Championships =

US sports event in Buffalo, New York

2015 IPC Ice Sledge Hockey World Championships (A-Pool)
Tournament details
- Host country: United States
- Venue(s): HarborCenter, Buffalo
- Dates: April 26 – May 3, 2015
- Teams: 8

Final positions
- Champions: United States (3rd title)
- Runners-up: Canada
- Third place: Russia
- Fourth place: Norway

Official website
- Buffalo2015.com

The 2015 IPC Ice Sledge Hockey World Championships for A-Pool teams (Canada, Czech Republic, Germany, Italy, Japan, Norway, Russia, United States) was held at HarborCenter in Buffalo, New York, United States, from April 26 through May 3, 2015.

This was the final time the event was known as the "IPC Ice Sledge Hockey World Championships". On November 30, 2016, the International Paralympic Committee adopted the "World Para" brand across the ten sports it governs, the official name of the sport changed from "sledge hockey" to "Para ice hockey", and the event became the World Para Ice Hockey Championships.

The World Championships for B-Pool teams (Austria, Great Britain, Poland, Slovakia, South Korea, Sweden) was held at Östersund Arena in Östersund, Sweden, from March 15 to March 21, 2015.

== A-Pool ==
=== Team rosters ===
Canada
Forwards: Kieran Block, Brad Bowden, Billy Bridges, Chris Cederstrand, Ben Delaney, Marc Dorion, Tyler McGregor, Bryan Sholomicki, Kevin Sorley, Greg Westlake
Defenders: Steve Arsenault, Adam Dixon, James Gemmell, Kevin Rempel, Derek Whitson
Goaltenders: Dominic Larocque, Corbin Watson

Czech Republic
Forwards: Michal Geier, Zdeněk Hábl, Zdeněk Krupička, Martin Novak, David Palát, Jiří Raul, Zdeněk Šafránek
Defenders: Jiří Berger, Miroslav Hrbek, Pavel Kubeš, David Motyčka
Goaltenders: Jan Matoušek, Michal Vápenka

Germany
Forwards: Bas Disveld, Bernhard Hering, Ingo Kuhli-Lauenstein, Frank Rennhack, Felix Schrader, Sven Stumpe, Joerg Wedde, Jacob Wolff
Defenders: Christian Jaster, Robert Pabst, Christian Pilz, Lucas Sklorz
Goaltenders: Klaus Brzoska, Simon Kunst

Italy
Forwards: Andrea Chiarotti, Valerio Corvino, Christoph Depaoli, Sandro Kalegaris, Nils Larch, Gregory Leperdi, Andrea Macri, Florian Planker, Roberto Radice, Werner Winker
Defenders: Bruno Balossetti, Gianluigi Rosa
Goaltenders: Gabriele Araudo, Santino Stillitano

Japan
Forwards: Susumu Hirose, Hideaki Ishii, Masaharu Kumagai, Nao Kodama, Tomohiko Maruo, Toshiyuki Nakamura, Taimei Shiba, Yoshihiro Shioya, Kazuhiro Takahashi, Mamoru Yoshikawa
Defenders: Wataru Horie, Eiji Misawa, Kazuya Mochizuki, Satoru Sudo
Goaltenders: Shinobu Fukushima, Mitsuru Nagase

Norway
Forwards: Thommas Avdal, Audun Bakke, Magnus Bøgle, Martin Hamre, Emil Kirstistuen, Jan Roger Klakegg, Rolf Einar Pedersen, Tor Joakim Rivera, Loyd Remi Pallander Solberg, Emil Sørheim, Stig Tore Svee
Defenders: Thomas Jacobsen, Knut Andre Nordstoga, Morten Værnes
Goaltenders: Kjell Christian Hamar, Roger Johansen

Russia
Forwards: Alexey Amosov, Maxim Kuzminykh, Dmitrii Lisov, Sergei Panfilov, Nikolay Terentyev, Vasili Varlakov, Ilia Volkov
Defenders: Ivan Berdnik, Mikhail Chekmarev, Ivan Kuznetsov, Vladimir Litvinenko, Aleksei Lysov, Alexander Pulin, Vadim Selyukin, Andrey Sokolov
Goaltenders: Andrei Kasatkin, Evegnii Plotnikov

United States
Forwards: Chris Douglas, Declan Farmer, Dan McCoy, Luke McDermott, Kevin McKee, Josh Misiewicz, Adam Page, Brody Roybal, Paul Schaus, Josh Sweeney
Defenders: Tyler Carron, Billy Hanning, Nikko Landeros, Sam Mumper, Josh Pauls
Goaltenders: Steve Cash, Kyle Huckaby

=== Preliminary round ===
All times are local (UTC–4).

==== Group A ====
Pos	Team	Pld	W	OTW	OTL	L	GF	GA	GD	Pts	Qualification
1	Canada	3	3	0	0	0	24	0	+24	9	Semifinals
2	Norway	3	2	0	0	1	8	6	+2	6	Semifinals
3	Czech Republic	3	1	0	0	2	3	6	−3	3	5–8th place semifinals
4	Japan	3	0	0	0	3	1	24	−23	0	5–8th place semifinals

April 26, 2015; 09:30	Norway	3–1 (0–1, 3–0, 0–0)	Czech Republic	HarborCenter, Buffalo

April 26, 2015; 13:00	Japan	0–17 (0–12, 0–3, 0–2)	Canada	HarborCenter, Buffalo

April 27, 2015; 09:30	Japan	1–2 (0–0, 0–1, 1–1)	Czech Republic	HarborCenter, Buffalo

April 27, 2015; 13:00	Norway	0–5 (0–3, 0–1, 0–1)	Canada	HarborCenter, Buffalo

April 29, 2015; 17:30	Czech Republic	0–2 (0–1, 0–0, 0–1)	Canada	HarborCenter, Buffalo

April 29, 2015; 21:00	Japan	0–5 (0–0, 0–3, 0–2)	Norway	HarborCenter, Buffalo

==== Group B ====
Pos	Team	Pld	W	OTW	OTL	L	GF	GA	GD	Pts	Qualification
1	United States (H)	3	3	0	0	0	20	1	+19	9	Semifinals
2	Russia	3	2	0	0	1	14	6	+8	6	Semifinals
3	Italy	3	1	0	0	2	1	10	−9	3	5–8th place semifinals
4	Germany	3	0	0	0	3	0	18	−18	0	5–8th place semifinals

(H) Host

April 26, 2015; 16:30	Germany	0–1 (0–1, 0–0, 0–0)	Italy	HarborCenter, Buffalo

April 26, 2015; 20:00	Russia	1–6 (0–1, 1–2, 0–3)	United States	HarborCenter, Buffalo

April 27, 2015; 16:30	Italy	0–3 (0–1, 0–1, 0–1)	Russia	HarborCenter, Buffalo

April 27, 2015; 20:00	Germany	0–7 (0–4, 0–3, 0–0)	United States	HarborCenter, Buffalo

April 29, 2015; 10:30	Germany	0–10 (0–3, 0–4, 0–3)	Russia	HarborCenter, Buffalo

April 29, 2015; 14:00	Italy	0–7 (0–1, 0–2, 0–4)	United States	HarborCenter, Buffalo

=== Classification round ===
==== Bracket ====
5–8th place semifinals
April 30
Japan	1
Italy	5
April 30
Germany	1
Czech Republic	0

Fifth place
May 2
Italy	4
Germany	2
Seventh place
May 2
Japan	1
Czech Republic	5

==== 5–8th place semifinals ====
April 30, 2015; 16:30	Germany	1–0 (0–0, 1–0, 0–0)	Czech Republic	HarborCenter, Buffalo

April 30, 2015; 20:00	Japan	1–5 (0–2, 1–1, 0–2)	Italy	HarborCenter, Buffalo

==== Seventh place game ====
May 2, 2015; 16:30	Japan	1–5 (0–4, 0–0, 1–1)	Czech Republic	HarborCenter, Buffalo

==== Fifth place game ====
May 2, 2015; 20:00	Italy	4–2 (2–0, 2–1, 0–1)	Germany	HarborCenter, Buffalo

=== Final round ===
==== Bracket ====
Semifinals
May 1
Russia	2
Canada	3
May 1
Norway	0
United States	6

Final
May 3
Canada	0
United States	3
Third place
May 3
Norway	1
Russia (OT)	2

==== Semifinals ====
May 1, 2015; 16:30	Russia	2–3 (1–0, 0–2, 1–1)	Canada	HarborCenter, Buffalo

May 1, 2015; 20:00	Norway	0–6 (0–2, 0–3, 0–1)	United States	HarborCenter, Buffalo

==== Bronze medal game ====
May 3, 2015; 11:00	Norway	1–2 OT (0–1, 1–0, 0–0) (OT: 0–1)	Russia	HarborCenter, Buffalo

==== Final ====
May 3, 2015; 14:30	Canada	0–3 (0–0, 0–0, 0–3)	United States	HarborCenter, Buffalo

=== Final standings ===
Pos	Grp	Team	Pld	W	OTW	OTL	L	GF	GA	GD	Pts	Final result
1	B	United States (H)	5	5	0	0	0	29	1	+28	15	Champions
2	A	Canada	5	4	0	0	1	27	5	+22	12	Runners-up
3	B	Russia	5	2	1	0	2	18	10	+8	8	Third place
4	A	Norway	5	2	0	1	2	9	14	−5	7	Fourth place
5	B	Italy	5	3	0	0	2	10	13	−3	9	
6	B	Germany	5	1	0	0	4	3	22	−19	3	
7	A	Czech Republic	5	2	0	0	3	8	8	0	6	Relegated to 2017 B-Pool
8	A	Japan	5	0	0	0	5	3	34	−31	0	Relegated to 2017 B-Pool

(H) Host

== B-Pool ==
=== Results ===
All times are local (UTC+1).

Pos	Team	Pld	W	OTW	OTL	L	GF	GA	GD	Pts	Qualification or relegation
1	South Korea	5	5	0	0	0	47	3	+44	15	Advanced to 2017 A-Pool
2	Sweden (H)	5	4	0	0	1	29	8	+21	12	Advanced to 2017 A-Pool
3	Slovakia	5	3	0	0	2	15	15	0	9	
4	Poland	5	1	1	0	3	8	29	−21	5	
5	Great Britain	5	1	0	1	3	6	26	−20	4	
6	Austria	5	0	0	0	5	1	25	−24	0	Relegated to 2016 C-Pool

Source: swehockey.se
(H) Host

16 March 2015; 12:00	Sweden	8–1 (3–0, 0–1, 5–0)	Poland	Östersund Arena, Östersund; Attendance: 212

Game reference

16 March 2015; 15:30	South Korea	9–0 (2–0, 2–0, 5–0)	Austria	Östersund Arena, Östersund; Attendance: 35

Game reference

16 March 2015; 19:00	Great Britain	0–6 (0–3, 0–1, 0–2)	Slovakia	Östersund Arena, Östersund; Attendance: 110

Game reference

17 March 2015; 12:00	South Korea	15–0 (7–0, 8–0, 10–0)	Poland	Östersund Arena, Östersund; Attendance: 120

Game reference

17 March 2015; 15:30	Great Britain	2–1 (1–0, 0–0, 1–1)	Austria	Östersund Arena, Östersund; Attendance: 60

Game reference

17 March 2015; 19:00	Sweden	5–1 (2–0, 1–1, 2–0)	Slovakia	Östersund Arena, Östersund; Attendance: 215

Game reference

18 March 2015; 12:00	Poland	3–0 (0–0, 2–0, 1–0)	Austria	Östersund Arena, Östersund; Attendance: 245

Game reference

18 March 2015; 15:30	South Korea	9–1 (2–0, 5–1, 2–0)	Slovakia	Östersund Arena, Östersund; Attendance: 55

Game reference

18 March 2015; 19:00	Sweden	6–2 (0–0, 4–1, 2–1)	Great Britain	Östersund Arena, Östersund; Attendance: 275

Game reference

20 March 2015; 12:00	South Korea	10–0 (5–0, 4–0, 1–0)	Great Britain	Östersund Arena, Östersund; Attendance: 75

Game reference

20 March 2015; 15:30	Slovakia	4–1 (1–0, 2–1, 1–0)	Poland	Östersund Arena, Östersund; Attendance: 75

Game reference

20 March 2015; 19:00	Sweden	8–0 (5–0, 1–0, 2–0)	Austria	Östersund Arena, Östersund; Attendance: 275

Game reference

21 March 2015; 12:00	Great Britain	2–3 OT (1–0, 0–1, 1–1) (OT: 0–1)	Poland	Östersund Arena, Östersund; Attendance: 67

Game reference

21 March 2015; 15:30	Slovakia	3–0 (0–0, 1–0, 2–0)	Austria	Östersund Arena, Östersund; Attendance: 25

Game reference

20 March 2015; 19:00	South Korea	4–2 (1–1, 3–0, 0–1)	Sweden	Östersund Arena, Östersund; Attendance: 340

Game reference
