= Kevin Rempel =

Canadian sledge hockey player

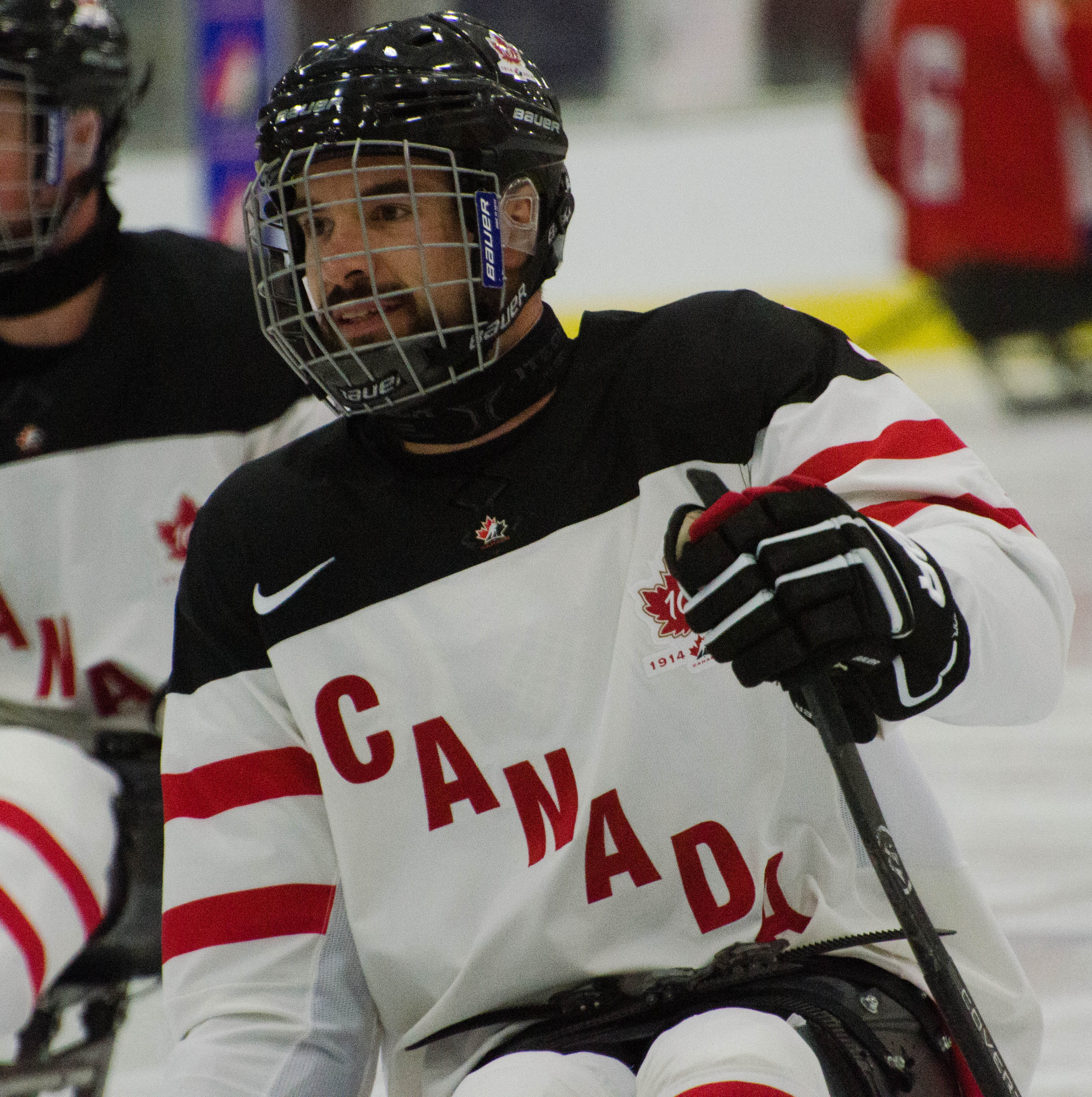
- Rempel in 2015

Personal information
- Born: September 15, 1982 (age 43) St. Catharines, Ontario, Canada
- Years active: 2010–2015
- Height: 6 ft 1 in (185 cm)
- Weight: 199 lb (90 kg)

Sport
- Country: Canada
- Sport: Ice sledge hockey
- Position: Forward
Medal record
Para ice hockey
Representing Canada
Paralympic Games
Bronze medal – third place	2014 Sochi	Team competition
World Championships
Gold medal – first place	2013 Goyang	Team competition
Silver medal – second place	2015 Buffalo	Team competition

Kevin Rempel (born September 15, 1982) is a Canadian sledge hockey player.

Rempel was born in St. Catharines, Ontario, and lists his hometown as Vineland, Ontario. He became an incomplete paraplegic in July 2006, after a dirt bike jumping accident. He began playing sledge hockey in 2008 with the Niagara Thunderblades. He won a gold medal with Team Canada at the 2013 IPC Ice Sledge Hockey World Championships in Goyang, Korea, and a bronze medal at the 2014 Winter Paralympics in Sochi, Russia.

== Early life ==
Rempel grew up in Vineland, Ontario and lived a very modest life. He enjoyed riding his BMX, skateboarding, snowboarding, and motocross as a child. His passion for motocross began at the age of 10 years old when neighbours down the street received motocross bikes for Christmas and saw the bikes riding in the back fields. Rempel got his first dirtbike at the age of 12.

After trying his hand at racing for a few years, it was apparent that he was not cut out for racing and decided to make a switch to pursue FMX (Freestyle Motocross). After being inspired during an 8-month trip to British Columbia during his college co-op, Rempel returned home to Ontario and started his own company, Underground FMX Productions, to being putting on his own FMX stunt shows.

After performing his first jump show on Canada Day weekend (July 1, 2006), Rempel crashed at his second show in Haliburton, Ontario on July 15, 2006. Rempel claims that he wasn't fully mentally focused that day riding, and as a result, when he took off on the take off ramp, he wasn't in the correct body position and decided to let go mid-air and landed on the ground without the motorcycle. The impact broke his back, pelvis, ribs, and he was instantly paralyzed.

== Spinal cord injury life ==
As a result of the motocross accident, Rempel is an incomplete paraplegic. He suffered a fracture-dislocation of his T12-L1 vertebrae. Luckily, he didn't sever his spinal cord, and as a result or surgery and therapy he was able to teach himself how to walk again. He still suffers from long terms effects living with a spinal cord injury, such as nerve pain and muscle spasms.

== Gerald Rempel ==
In addition to Kevin's accident, his father, Gerald Rempel, also had an accident which resulted in a spinal cord injury. Kevin and Gerald were building a tree stand one day when the branch Gerald was standing on broke, and he fell 25 feet to the ground breaking his back and became a complete paraplegic just nine months from retirement. Unfortunately, Gerald struggled with his spinal cord injury and became very negative, and developed a gambling addiction.

Gerald's wife, Shirley, eventually left Gerald, not because of his disability, but because of his negative attitude. Seven weeks later Gerald committed suicide. Soon after, while at family counselling, Kevin was asked to share his story of mental resilience and perseverance at a fundraising event for Spinal Cord Injury Ontario. His story was very well received and that is what ultimately started his speaking career.

== Team Canada ==
Rempel played five years with the Canadian Men's National Para Ice Hockey Team (2010–2015). He helped Canada earn a Gold medal at the 2013 World Championships and a Bronze medal at the 2014 Paralympic Winter Games in Sochi, Russia.

== Keynote speaking ==
Rempel is a keynote speaker and workshop facilitator whose programs are focused on decision making, safety leadership, change management, and inclusive leadership. His speaking work is built around the Check Your EGO framework (Check Your Excuses, Gut, and Options) a practical tool designed to help leaders and teams recognize how internal voice influences decisions under pressure and uncertainty.

His keynote presentations include The Safety Shift: Leading Without EGO, addressing decision making in safety leadership contexts; The Hero Mindset: How to Make Clear, Confident Decisions in Times of Change, focused on leadership through organizational change; and Leading With Empathy: Hidden Disabilities Are All Around Us, which explores inclusive leadership and the impact of non-visible disabilities in the workplace.

Rempel has delivered keynotes and workshops for organizations including Deloitte, Enbridge, SaskPower, NAV Canada, FortisBC, WorkSafe BC, and Baytex Energy, among others.

== The Sledge Hockey Experience ==
Upon retiring from Team Canada, Rempel created a corporate team building program called the Sledge Hockey Experience to help bridge the gap between the able-bodied population and people with disabilities. The program is run out of the Ford Performance Centre in Etobicoke, Ontario and is a three hour turn-key program designed for a 20 person VIP experience to “Get #buttdown on the ice for a new perspective on sport, life, and people with disabilities.”
