= Vadim Selyukin =

Russian sledge hockey player

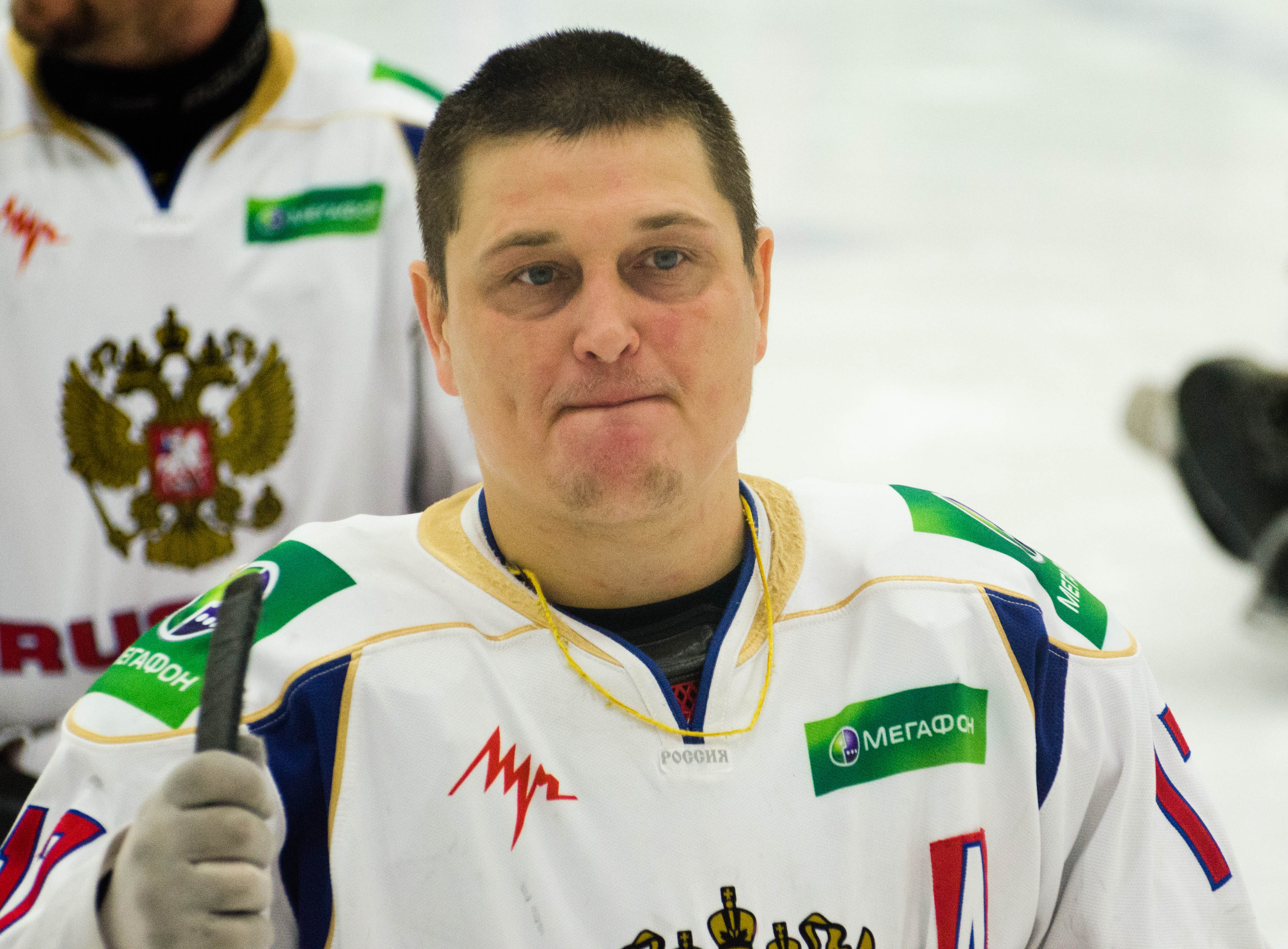
- Selyukin in 2015

Personal information
- Nationality: Russia
- Born: 26 March 1977 (age 49) Kemerovo, Soviet Union
Medal record
Para ice hockey
Representing Russia
Paralympic Games
Silver medal – second place	2014 Sochi	Team competition
World Championships
Bronze medal – third place	2013 Goyang	Team competition
Bronze medal – third place	2015 Buffalo	Team competition
European Championships
Gold medal – first place	2016 Östersund	Team competition

Vadim Selyukin (born 26 March 1977) is a Russian sledge hockey player and a captain of the Russian sledge hockey team. In 2013 he led his team to the bronze medal at the IPC Ice Sledge Hockey World Championships which were hosted in Goyang, South Korea.

== Early life ==
Selyukin was injured in Tajikistan while representing Russian Armed Forces there.
