= Corbin Watson =

Canadian ice sledge hockey player (born 1987)

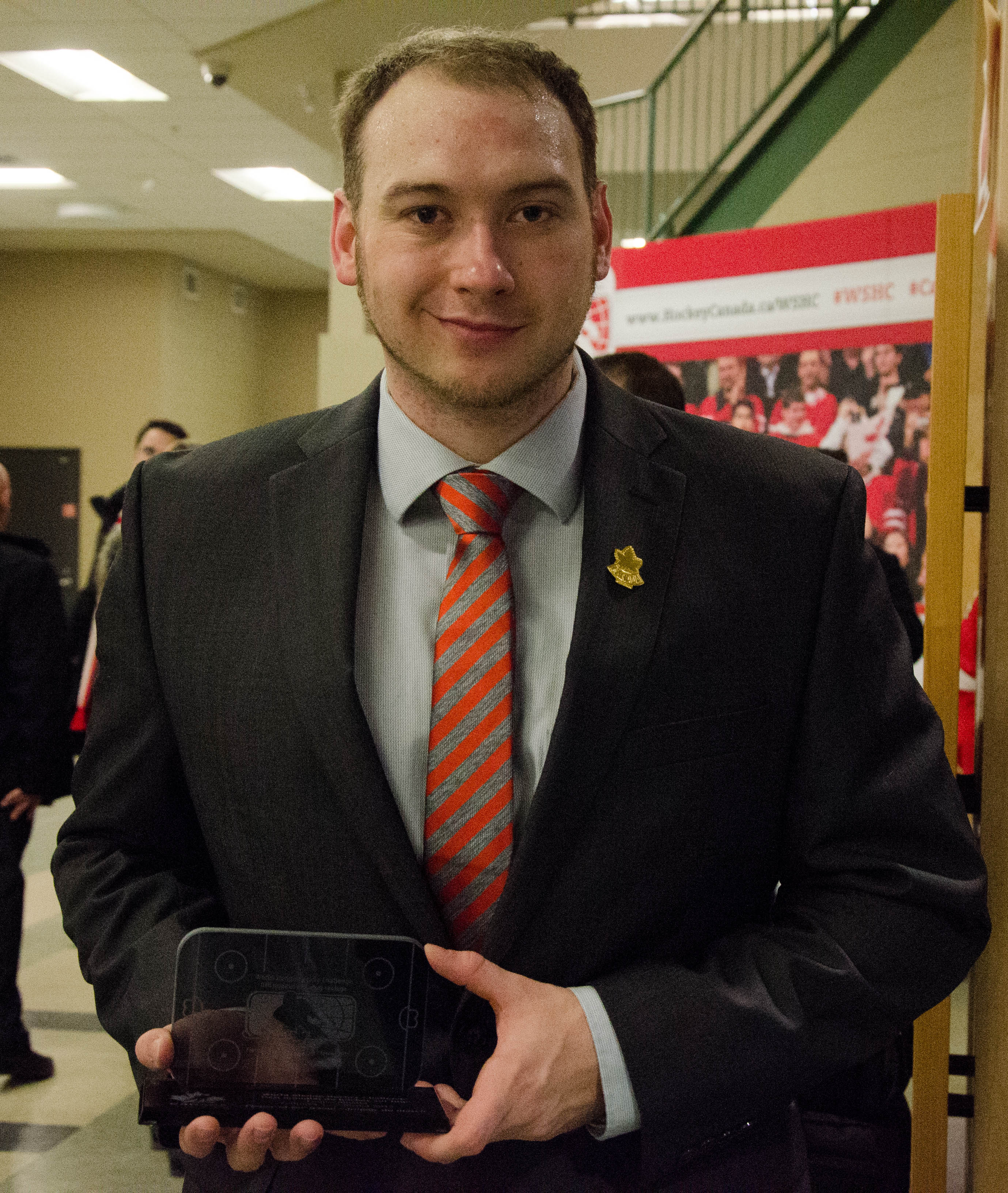
- Watson in 2015

Personal information
- Nationality: Canada
- Born: January 6, 1987 (age 39) Kingsville, Ontario, Canada
Medal record
Para ice hockey
Representing Canada
Paralympic Games
| Silver medal – second place | 2018 Pyeongchang | Team competition |
| Silver medal – second place | 2026 Milano Cortina | Team competition |
| Bronze medal – third place | 2014 Sochi | Team competition |
World Championships
| Gold medal – first place | 2013 Goyang | Team competition |
| Gold medal – first place | 2017 Gangneung | Team competition |
| Gold medal – first place | 2024 Calgary | Team competition |
| Silver medal – second place | 2015 Buffalo | Team competition |
| Silver medal – second place | 2019 Ostrava | Team competition |
| Silver medal – second place | 2025 Buffalo | Team competition |
| Bronze medal – third place | 2012 Hamar | Team competition |

Corbin Watson (born January 6, 1987) is a Canadian Paralympic ice sledge hockey goalkeeper.

== Career ==
He was a member of team Canada who defeated Norway and won a bronze medal at the 2014 Winter Paralympics.

Previously, he participated at the 2013 IPC World Sledge Hockey Championships where he and his team won a gold medal. An amputee, he lost his lower right leg following a car crash in 2006. Following the accident he joined Canadian sledge hockey team called Windsor Ice Bullets two years later in Windsor, Ontario where he was inspired by Ray Grassi, his teammate. In 2009 he won a gold medal at the Défi sportif tournament.

He competed at the 2026 Winter Paralympics and won a silver medal, Canada's third consecutive silver medal in Para ice hockey at the Winter Paralympics.

== Personal life ==
He is a son of Alex and Joan Watson, and has a brother and a sister. In June 2013 he was awarded with the key to Kingsville for his performance at the 2013 IPC World Sledge Hockey Championship. He is inspired by Canadian hockey players such as Martin Brodeur and Miikka Kiprusoff.
