= Vladimir Litvinenko (sledge hockey) =

Russian sledge hockey player

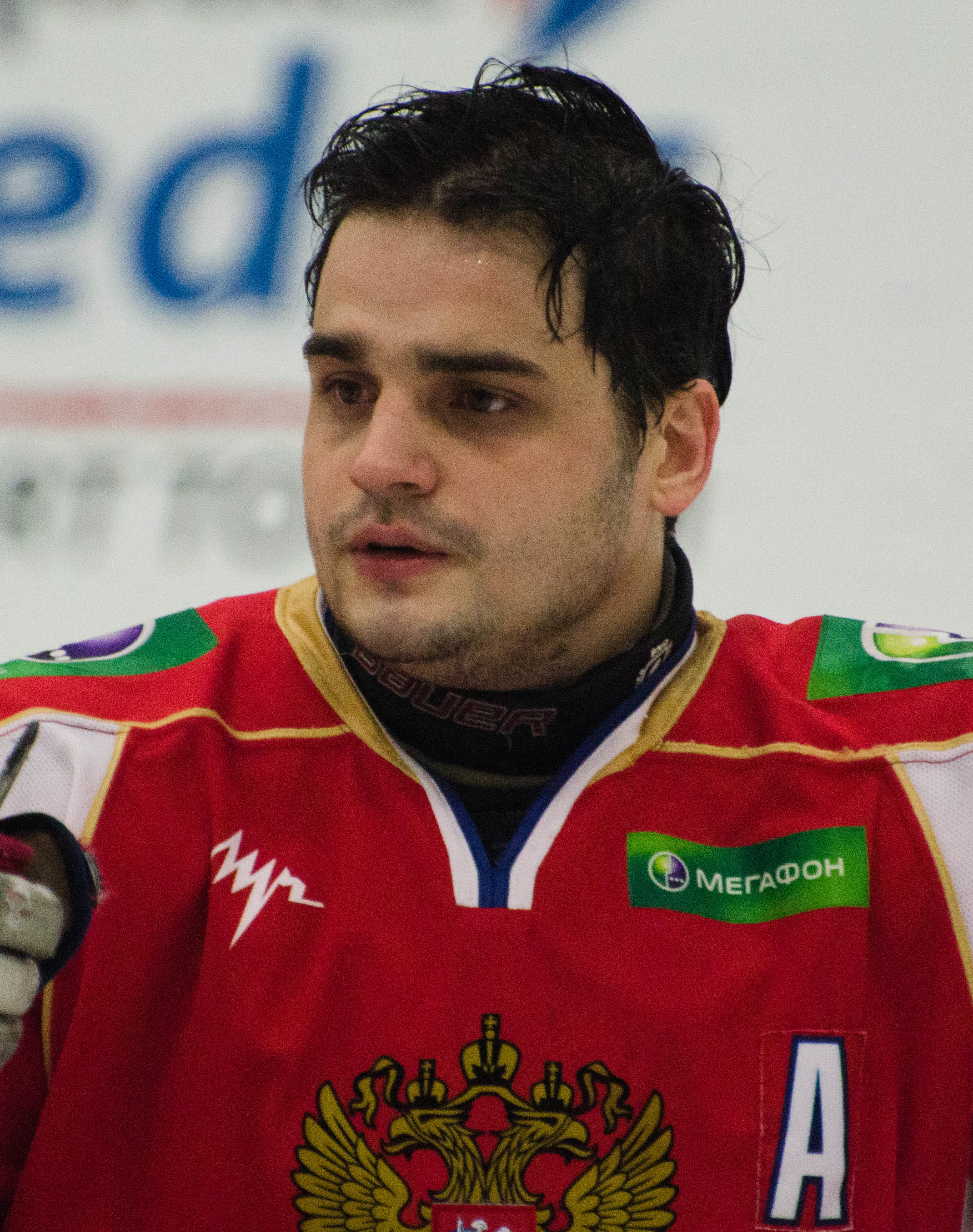
- Litvinenko in 2015

Personal information
- Full name: Vladimir Valeryevich Litvinenko
- Nationality: Russia
- Born: 1 June 1989 (age 37) Kemerovo, Russian SFSR, Soviet Union
Medal record
Para ice hockey
Representing Russia
Paralympic Games
Silver medal – second place	2014 Sochi	Team competition
World Championships
Bronze medal – third place	2015 Buffalo	Team competition

Vladimir Valeryevich Litvinenko (Russian: Владимир Валерьевич Литвиненко; born 1 June 1989) is a Russian sledge hockey player. In the 2014 Winter Paralympics, he won the silver medal in the men's sledge hockey tournament with Russia.
