= Vladimir Kamantsev =

Russian sledge hockey player

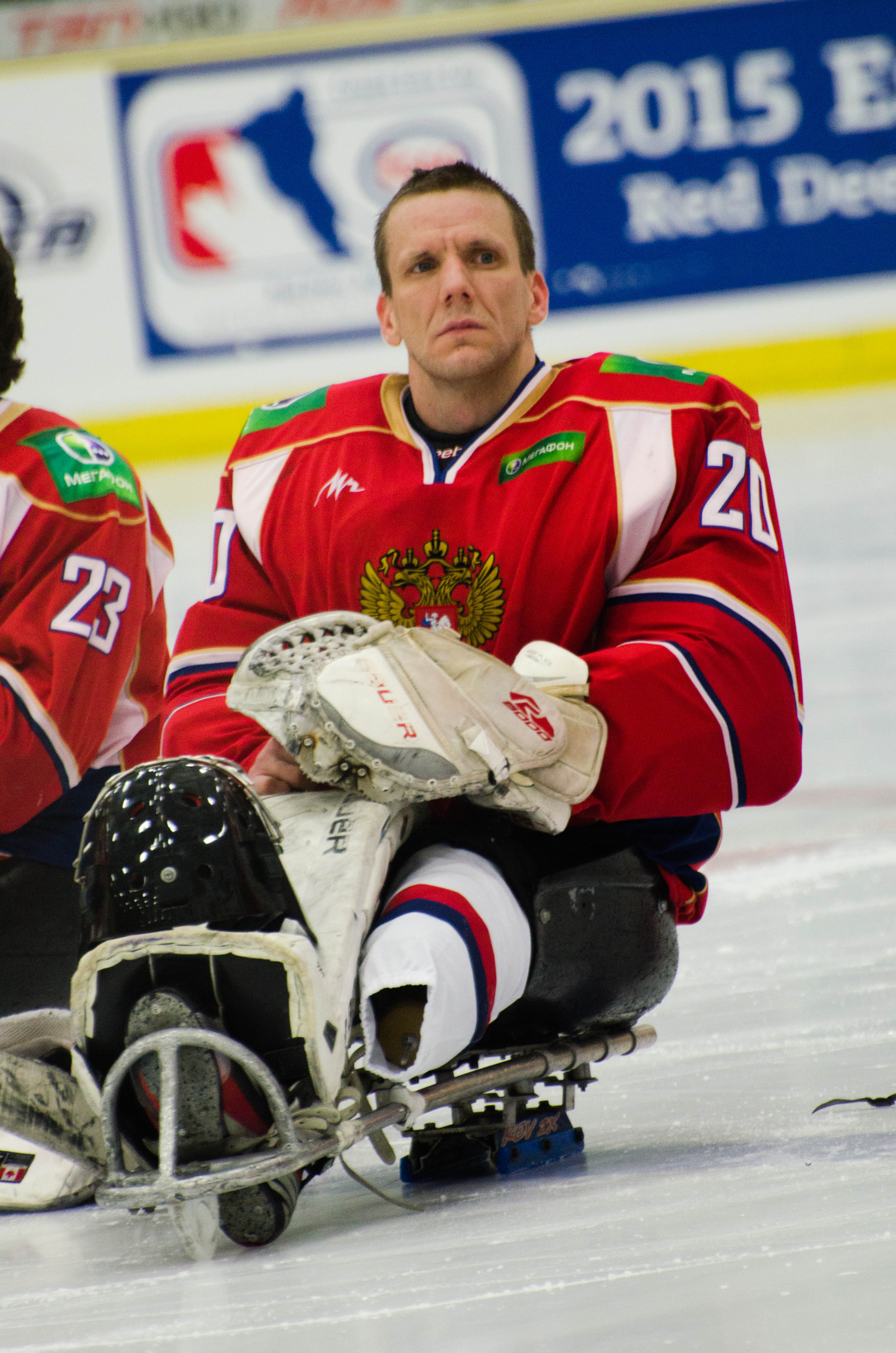
- Kamantsev in 2015

Personal information
- Nationality: Russia
- Born: 12 May 1979 (age 47) Izhevsk, Soviet Union

Sport
- Position: Goaltender
Medal record
Para ice hockey
Representing Russia
Paralympic Games
Silver medal – second place	2014 Sochi	Team competition

Vladimir Kamantsev (born 12 May 1979) is a Russian sledge hockey player. In the 2014 Winter Paralympics, he won the silver medal in the men's sledge hockey tournament with Russia.
