= Kevin Sorley =

Canadian ice sledge hockey player

Personal information
- Nationality: Canadian
- Born: July 6, 1993 (age 32)
- Height: 6 ft 0 in (183 cm) (2017)
- Weight: 167 lb (76 kg) (2017)
Medal record
Men's para ice hockey
Representing Canada
World Championships
Gold medal – first place	2017 Gangneung	Team competition
Silver medal – second place	2015 Buffalo	Team competition
Silver medal – second place	2019 Ostrava	Team competition

Kevin Sorley (born July 6, 1993) is a Canadian ice sledge hockey player.

Sorley was a member of Canada's gold medal winning team at the 2017 World Para Ice Hockey Championships in Gangneung, South Korea.

He was also a member of Canada's silver medal winning team at the 2019 World Para Ice Hockey Championships in Ostrava, Czech Republic.
