= Greg Westlake =

Canadian ice sledge hockey player

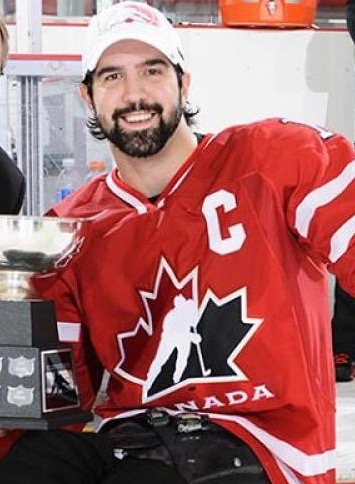
- Westlake in 2015
- Born: 12 June 1986 (age 40) North Vancouver, British; Columbia, Canada
- Height: 6 ft 2 in (188 cm)
- Weight: 170 lb (77 kg; 12 st 2 lb)
- Position: Forward
- National team: Canada
- Playing career: 2003–present
Medal record
Para ice hockey
Representing Canada
Paralympic Games
Gold medal – first place	2006 Torino	Team competition
Silver medal – second place	2018 Pyeongchang	Team competition
Silver medal – second place	2022 Beijing	Team competition
Silver medal – second place	2026 Milano Cortina	Team competition
Bronze medal – third place	2014 Sochi	Team competition
World Championships
Gold medal – first place	2008 Marlborough	Team competition
Gold medal – first place	2013 Goyang	Team competition
Silver medal – second place	2015 Buffalo	Team competition
Silver medal – second place	2019 Ostrava	Team competition
Silver medal – second place	2021 Ostrava	Team competition
Bronze medal – third place	2009 Ostrava	Team competition
Bronze medal – third place	2012 Hamar	Team competition

Gregory Westlake (born 12 June 1986) is a Canadian ice sledge hockey player.

== Early life and career ==
Both his legs were amputated when he was 18 months old; because of a congenital defect, he had no tibia in one leg, and no fibula in the other. At age six, he appeared in a public service announcement for The War Amps non-profit organization on playing safe, and is still close to the organization that provides support and services to all Canadian amputees.

He began to play ice sledge hockey in 2001 at age 15, for the Mississauga Cruisers, then made his debut for the Canadian national team in 2003, eventually becoming captain of the team. He has won medals at the 2006 Winter Paralympics and 2014 Winter Paralympics. An accomplished golfer, he regularly competes in local club championships in his hometown and both introduced his older brother to the game and taught him how to play.

He competed at the 2026 Winter Paralympics and won a silver medal, Canada's third consecutive silver medal in Para ice hockey at the Winter Paralympics.

He is also the host of Level Playing Field, a television newsmagazine and interview series on disability issues in sports, for AMI-tv.

== Honours ==
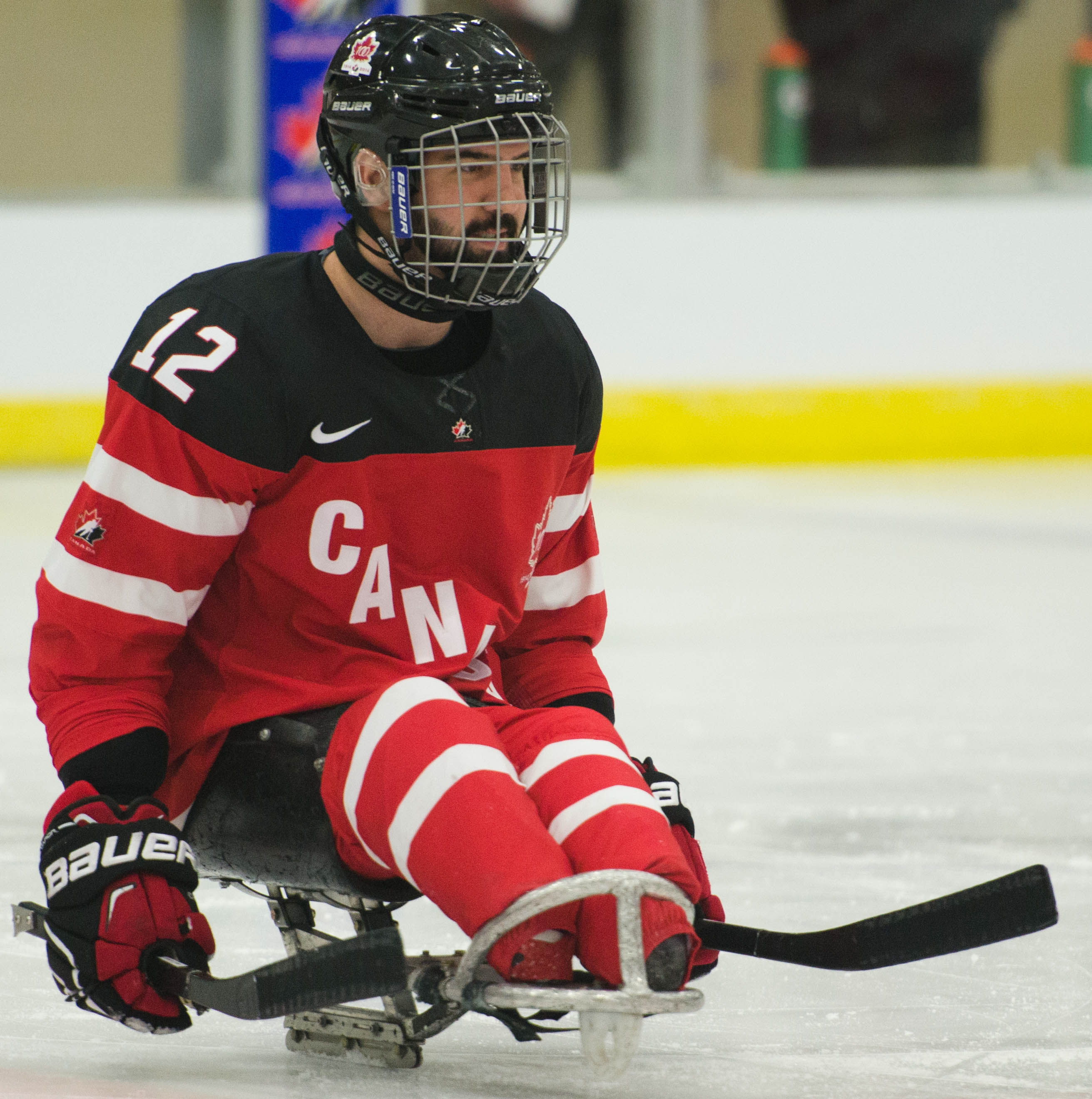
Westlake in 2015

- 2013 IPC Ice Sledge Hockey World Championships
- Gold (Greg was named forward of the tournament)
- 2014 Winter Paralympics
  - Bronze medal
- 2010 Winter Paralympics
  - 4th place in ice sledge hockey
- 2009 IPC Ice Sledge Hockey World Championships
  - Bronze
- 2008 IPC Ice Sledge Hockey World Championships
  - Gold (Greg scored the winning goal, 8 seconds from the end)
- 2006 Winter Paralympics
  - Gold in ice sledge hockey
- 2004 IPC Ice Sledge Hockey World Championships
  - 4th place
