= Shayba Arena =

Multi-purpose arena in Adler, Sochi, Russia

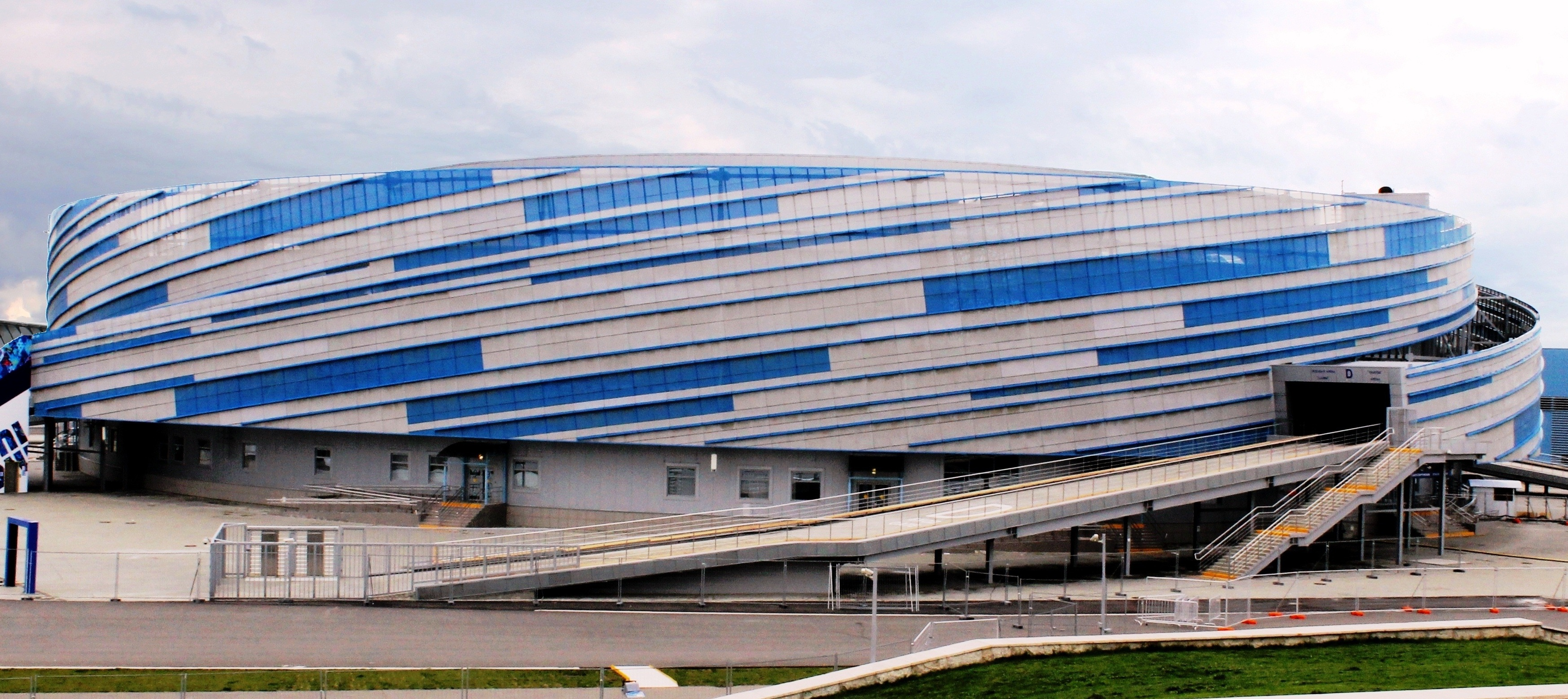
- The arena during 2014 Winter Olympics
- Interactive map of Shayba Arena
- Former names: Maly Ice Palace
- Location: Sochi Olympic Park, Sochi, Russia
- Coordinates: 43°24′08″N 39°57′07″E
- Owner: Sochi Olympic Park
- Operator: Ice Hockey Federation of Russia
- Capacity: 7,000

Construction
- Opened: 2013
- Cost: $35 million
- Architect: Baltic Construction Company

Tenant
- 2014 Winter Olympics

The Shayba Arena (formerly known as Maly Ice Palace, in Russian: Ледовая Арена Шайба) is a 7,000-seat multi-purpose indoor arena located at Sochi Olympic Park in Adler, southern rayon of Sochi in Russia. "Shayba" is Russian for a hockey puck. The venue was operated by the Russian Ice Hockey Federation and hosted the ice sledge hockey events during the 2014 Winter Paralympics, and some of the ice hockey events during 2014 Winter Olympics along with Bolshoy Ice Dome. The venues were located 300 metres (980 ft) apart.

== Post Olympic Use ==
Following the 2014 Winter Olympics, the Russian government abandoned plans to dismantle and relocate the arena. In 2015, the venue was repurposed as a key facility for the Sirius Educational Centre, an elite academy for gifted children in the fields of sports, arts, and science. It now serves as a year-round training center for youth ice hockey and hosts various regional completions and sports-educational programs under the Sirius Foundation.

== See also ==
- List of indoor arenas in Russia
