= 2013 IPC Ice Sledge Hockey World Championships =

Tournament details
- Host country: South Korea
- Venue: 1 (in 1 host city)
- Dates: 12–20 April 2013
- Teams: 8

Final positions
- Champions: Canada (3rd title)
- Runners-up: United States
- Third place: Russia
- Fourth place: Czech Republic

Tournament statistics
- Games played: 20
- Goals scored: 75 (3.75 per game)
- Scoring leader: (Canada) Brad Bowden (10 points)

The 2013 IPC Ice Sledge Hockey World Championships was the seventh IPC Ice Sledge Hockey World Championships that took place in the SPART Complex in Goyang, South Korea from 12 to 20 April 2013. It was the first time that South Korea hosted the IPC Ice Sledge Hockey World Championships. In the final match, Canada defeated the United States 1–0, to win their third title. Russia defeated the Czech Republic 3-0 for the bronze medal.

== A-Pool ==
=== Preliminary round ===
All times are local (UTC+9).

==== Group A ====
Pos	Team	Pld	W	OTW	OTL	L	GF	GA	GD	Pts	Qualification
1	United States	3	3	0	0	0	17	0	+17	9	Semifinals
2	Czech Republic	3	2	0	0	1	4	4	0	6	Semifinals
3	Norway	3	1	0	0	2	3	11	−8	3	5–8th place semifinals
4	Sweden	3	0	0	0	3	1	10	−9	0	5–8th place semifinals

Source: IPC

13 April 2013; 09:15	United States	7–0 (2–0, 3–0, 2–0)	Sweden	Goyang Ice Rink, Goyang

Game reference

13 April 2013; 12:30	Czech Republic	3–1 (1–1, 1–0, 1–0)	Norway	Goyang Ice Rink, Goyang

Game reference

14 April 2013; 09:15	Czech Republic	1–0 (0–0, 1–0, 0–0)	Sweden	Goyang Ice Rink, Goyang

Game reference

14 April 2013; 13:00	United States	7–0 (2–0, 4–0, 1–0)	Norway	Goyang Ice Rink, Goyang

Game reference

16 April 2013; 17:00	Norway	2–1 (2–0, 0–0, 0–1)	Sweden	Goyang Ice Rink, Goyang

Game reference

16 April 2013; 20:00	United States	3–0 (1–0, 2–0, 0–0)	Czech Republic	Goyang Ice Rink, Goyang

Game reference

==== Group B ====
Pos	Team	Pld	W	OTW	OTL	L	GF	GA	GD	Pts	Qualification
1	Canada	3	3	0	0	0	14	3	+11	9	Semifinals
2	Russia	3	2	0	0	1	6	5	+1	6	Semifinals
3	Italy	3	1	0	0	2	2	7	−5	3	5–8th place semifinals
4	South Korea (H)	3	0	0	0	3	2	9	−7	0	5–8th place semifinals

Source: IPC
(H) Host

13 April 2013; 15:45	South Korea	1–2 (0–1, 0–0, 1–1)	Russia	Goyang Ice Rink, Goyang

Game reference

13 April 2013; 19:00	Canada	5–0 (1–0, 3–0, 1–0)	Italy	Goyang Ice Rink, Goyang

Game reference

14 April 2013; 15:45	Canada	4–3 (4–1, 0–0, 0–2)	Russia	Goyang Ice Rink, Goyang

Game reference

14 April 2013; 19:00	South Korea	1–2 (1–0, 0–2, 0–0)	Italy	Goyang Ice Rink, Goyang

Game reference

16 April 2013; 10:45	Italy	0–1 (0–0, 0–0, 0–1)	Russia	Goyang Ice Rink, Goyang

Game reference

16 April 2013; 14:15	South Korea	0–5 (0–2, 0–1, 0–2)	Canada	Goyang Ice Rink, Goyang

Game reference

=== Classification round ===
==== Bracket ====
5–8th place semifinals
17 April
South Korea	1
Norway (OT)	2
17 April
Italy	2
Sweden	1

Fifth place
19 April
Norway (GWS)	2
Italy	1
Seventh place
19 April
South Korea	5
Sweden	0

==== 5–8th place semifinals ====
17 April 2013; 15:00	South Korea	1–2 OT (0–0, 1–1, 0–0) (OT: 0–1)	Norway	Goyang Ice Rink, Goyang

Game reference

17 April 2013; 18:30	Italy	2–1 (0–1, 0–0, 2–0)	Sweden	Goyang Ice Rink, Goyang

Game reference

==== Seventh place game ====
19 April 2013; 15:00	South Korea	5–0 (3–0, 1–0, 1–0)	Sweden	Goyang Ice Rink, Goyang

Game reference

==== Fifth place game ====
19 April 2013; 18:30	Norway	2–1 GWS (0–0, 0–1, 1–0) (OT: 0–0) (SO: 1–0)	Italy	Goyang Ice Rink, Goyang

Game reference

=== Final round ===
==== Bracket ====
Semifinals
18 April
United States	2
Russia	1
18 April
Canada	5
Czech Republic	0

Final
20 April
United States	0
Canada	1
Third place
20 April
Russia	3
Czech Republic	0

==== Semifinals ====
18 April 2013; 15:00	United States	2–1 (1–0, 1–0, 0–1)	Russia	Goyang Ice Rink, Goyang

Game reference

18 April 2013; 18:30	Canada	5–0 (0–0, 4–0, 1–0)	Czech Republic	Goyang Ice Rink, Goyang

Game reference

==== Bronze medal game ====
20 April 2013; 13:00	Russia	3–0 (1–0, 2–0, 0–0)	Czech Republic	Goyang Ice Rink, Goyang

Game reference

==== Final ====
20 April 2013; 16:30	United States	0–1 (0–0, 0–1, 0–0)	Canada	Goyang Ice Rink, Goyang

Game reference

=== Final standings ===
Pos	Grp	Team	Pld	W	OTW	OTL	L	GF	GA	GD	Pts	Final result
1	B	Canada	5	5	0	0	0	20	3	+17	15	Champions
2	A	United States	5	4	0	0	1	19	2	+17	12	Runners-up
3	B	Russia	5	3	0	0	2	10	7	+3	9	Third place
4	A	Czech Republic	5	2	0	0	3	4	12	−8	6	Fourth place
5	A	Norway	5	1	2	0	2	7	13	−6	7	
6	B	Italy	5	2	0	1	2	5	10	−5	7	
7	B	South Korea (H)	5	1	0	1	3	8	11	−3	4	Relegated to 2015 B-Pool
8	A	Sweden	5	0	0	0	5	2	17	−15	0	Relegated to 2015 B-Pool

(H) Host

=== Awards ===
- Best players selected by the Directorate:
  - Best Goaltender: (Russia) Mikhail Ivanov
  - Best Defenceman: (United States) Taylor Chace
  - Best Forward: (Canada) Greg Westlake

== B-Pool ==
=== Preliminary round ===
All times are local (UTC+9).

==== Group A ====
Pos	Team	Pld	W	OTW	OTL	L	GF	GA	GD	Pts	Qualification
1	Japan (H)	2	2	0	0	0	14	1	+13	6	Semifinals
2	Great Britain	2	1	0	0	1	9	3	+6	3	Semifinals
3	Poland	2	0	0	0	2	0	19	−19	0	Fifth place game

(H) Host

11 March 2013; 17:30	Japan	11–0 (4–0, 4–0, 3–0)	Poland	Big Hat, Nagano

Game reference

12 March 2013; 17:30	Japan	3–1 (0–0, 2–0, 1–1)	Great Britain	Big Hat, Nagano

Game reference

13 March 2013; 17:30	Great Britain	8–0 (2–0, 3–0, 3–0)	Poland	Big Hat, Nagano

Game reference

==== Group B ====
Pos	Team	Pld	W	OTW	OTL	L	GF	GA	GD	Pts	Qualification
1	Germany	2	2	0	0	0	14	2	+12	6	Semifinals
2	Estonia	2	1	0	0	1	4	7	−3	3	Semifinals
3	Slovakia	2	0	0	0	2	0	9	−9	0	Fifth place game

11 March 2013; 14:00	Estonia	2–7 (0–2, 0–4, 2–1)	Germany	Big Hat, Nagano

Game reference

12 March 2013; 14:00	Germany	7–0 (4–0, 3–0, 0–0)	Slovakia	Big Hat, Nagano

Game reference

13 March 2013; 14:00	Estonia	2–0 (0–0, 2–0, 0–0)	Slovakia	Big Hat, Nagano

Game reference

=== Final round ===
==== Bracket ====
Semifinals
15 March
Japan	4
Estonia	1
15 March
Germany	4
Great Britain	0

Final
16 March
Japan	2
Germany	3
Third place
16 March
Estonia	2
Great Britain	3

==== Semifinals ====
15 March 2013; 14:00	Germany	4–0 (0–0, 2–0, 2–0)	Great Britain	Big Hat, Nagano

Game reference

15 March 2013; 17:35	Japan	4–1 (0–1, 3–0, 1–0)	Estonia	Big Hat, Nagano

Game reference

==== Fifth place game ====
15 March 2013; 10:30	Poland	0–4 (0–0, 0–2, 0–2)	Slovakia	Big Hat, Nagano

Game reference

==== Third place game ====
16 March 2013; 10:30	Estonia	2–3 (0–1, 1–2, 1–0)	Great Britain	Big Hat, Nagano

Game reference

==== Final ====
16 March 2013; 14:00	Japan	2–3 (0–0, 0–2, 2–1)	Germany	Big Hat, Nagano

Game reference

=== Final standings ===
Rank	Team
1	Germany ▲
2	Japan ▲
3	Great Britain
4	Estonia
5	Slovakia
6	Poland
