= List of 2014 Winter Paralympics medal winners =

The 2014 Winter Paralympics, officially the XI Paralympic Winter Games, or the 11th Winter Paralympics, were held from 7 to 16 March 2014 in Sochi, Russia. 72 events in 5 winter sport disciplines were contested.

== Alpine skiing ==
=== Women's events ===
Event	Class	Gold		Silver		Bronze	
Downhill	visually impaired	Henrieta Farkašová; Guide: Natália Šubrtová; Slovakia	1:31.55	Jade Etherington; Guide: Caroline Powell; Great Britain	1:34.28	Aleksandra Frantceva; Guide: Pavel Zabotin; Russia	1:35.78
Downhill	sitting	Anna Schaffelhuber; Germany	1:35.55	Alana Nichols; United States	1:35.69	Laurie Stephens; United States	1:36.94
Downhill	standing	Marie Bochet; France	1:30.72	Inga Medvedeva; Russia	1:32.19	Allison Jones; United States	1:34.09
Super-G	visually impaired	Kelly Gallagher; Guide: Charlotte Evans; Great Britain	1:28.72	Aleksandra Frantceva; Guide: Pavel Zabotin; Russia	1:28.94	Jade Etherington; Guide: Caroline Powell; Great Britain	1:29.76
Super-G	sitting	Anna Schaffelhuber; Germany	1:29.11	Claudia Loesch; Austria	1:31.20	Laurie Stephens; United States	1:32.09
Super-G	standing	Marie Bochet; France	1:24.20	Solène Jambaqué; France	1:26.20	Stephanie Jallen; United States	1:30.14
Giant slalom	visually impaired	Henrieta Farkasova; Guide: Natália Šubrtová; Slovakia	2:48.63	Aleksandra Frantceva; Guide: Pavel Zabotin; Russia	2:54.91	Jessica Gallagher; Guide: Christian Geiger; Australia	3:02.11
Giant slalom	sitting	Anna Schaffelhuber; Germany	2:51.26	Claudia Loesch; Austria	2:55.91	Anna-Lena Forster; Germany	2:59.33
Giant slalom	standing	Marie Bochet; France	2:38.84	Andrea Rothfuss; Germany	2:39.70	Solène Jambaqué; France	2:46.81
Slalom	visually impaired	Aleksandra Frantceva; Russia	2:01.24	Jade Etherington; Great Britain	2:01.89	Henrieta Farkasova; Slovakia	2:02.94
Slalom	sitting	Anna Schaffelhuber; Germany	2:09.93	Anna-Lena Forster; Germany	2:14.35	Kimberly Joines; Canada	2:15.16
Slalom	standing	Andrea Rothfuss; Germany	1:59.85	Inga Medvedeva; Russia	2:06.70	Petra Smarzova; Slovakia	2:06.91
Super combined	visually impaired	Aleksandra Frantceva; Guide: Pavel Zabotin; Russia	2:27.75	Jade Etherington; Guide: Caroline Powell; Great Britain	2:28.38	Danelle Umstead; Guide: Robert Umstead; United States	2:42.09
Super combined	sitting	Anna Schaffelhuber; Germany	2:33.30	Anna-Lena Forster; Germany	2:38.96	Not awarded	
Super combined	standing	Marie Bochet; France	2:18.39	Andrea Rothfuss; Germany	2:22.74	Stephanie Jallen; United States	2:23.13
Snowboard cross	standing	Bibian Mentel-Spee; Netherlands	1:57.43	Cécile Hernandez-Cervellon; France	2:07.31	Amy Purdy; United States	2:14.29

=== Men's events ===
Event	Class	Gold		Silver		Bronze	
Downhill	visually impaired	Jon Santacana Maiztegui; Guide: Miguel Galindo Garces; Spain	1:21.76	Miroslav Haraus; Guide: Maros Hudik; Slovakia	1:22.01	Mac Marcoux; Guide: Robin Femy; Canada	1:23.02
Downhill	sitting	Akira Kano; Japan	1:23.80	Josh Dueck; Canada	1:24.19	Takeshi Suzuki; Japan	1:24.75
Downhill	standing	Markus Salcher; Austria	1:24.35	Alexey Bugaev; Russia	1:24.41	Vincent Gauthier-Manuel; France	1:25.30
Super-G	visually impaired	Jakub Krako; Guide: Martin Motyka; Slovakia	1:20.58	Mark Bathum; Guide: Cade Yamamoto; United States	1:20.71	Mac Marcoux; Guide: Robin Femy; Canada	1:20.77
Super-G	sitting	Akira Kano; Japan	1:19.51	Taiki Morii; Japan	1:21.60	Caleb Brousseau; Canada	1:22.05
Super-G	standing	Markus Salcher; Austria	1:20.92	Matthias Lanzinger; Austria	1:21.33	Alexey Bugaev; Russia	1:22.30
Giant slalom	visually impaired	Mac Marcoux; Guide: Robin Femy; Canada	2:29.62	Jakub Krako; Guide: Martin Motyka; Slovakia	2:31.66	Valerii Redkozubov; Guide:Evgeni Geroev; Russia	2:33.57
Giant slalom	sitting	Christoph Kunz; Switzerland	2:32.73	Corey Peters; New Zealand	2:33.20	Roman Rabl; Austria	2:33.31
Giant slalom	standing	Vincent Gauthier-Manuel; France	2:25.87	Alexey Bugaev; Russia	2:27.87	Markus Salcher; Austria	2:28.14
Slalom	visually impaired	Valerii Redkozubov; Guide:Evgeni Geroev; Russia	1:43.21	Yon Santacana Maiztegui; Guide:Miguel Galindo Garces; Spain	1:46.82	Chris Williamson; Guide:Nick Brush; Canada	1:48.61
Slalom	sitting	Takeshi Suzuki; Japan	1:53.78	Philipp Bonadimann; Austria	1:56.46	Roman Rabl; Austria	1:56.64
Slalom	standing	Alexey Bugaev; Russia	1:38.97	Vincent Gauthier-Manuel; France	1:40.24	Alexander Alyabyev; Russia	1:40.74
Super combined	visually impaired	Valerii Redkozubov; Guide:Evgeni Geroev; Russia	2:15.87	Mark Bathum; Guide:Cade Yamamoto; United States	2:17.38	Gabriel Juan Gorce Yepes; Guide:Josep Arnau Ferrer Ventura; Spain	2:20.36
Super combined	sitting	Josh Dueck; Canada	2:18.20	Heath Calhoun; United States	2:19.09	Roman Rabl; Austria	2:20.20
Super combined	standing	Alexey Bugaev; Russia	2:09.72	Matthias Lanzinger; Austria	2:10.82	Toby Kane; Australia	2:14.14
Snowboard cross	standing	Evan Strong; United States	1:43.61	Michael Shea; United States	1:44.18	Keith Gabel; United States	1:47.10

== Biathlon ==
=== Women's events ===
Event	Class	Gold		Silver		Bronze	
6 kilometres	Visually impaired	Mikhalina Lysova; Guide: Alexey Ivanov; Russia	20:03.2	Iuliia Budaleeva; Guide: Tatiana Maltseva; Russia	20:31.7	Oksana Shyshkova; Guide: Lada Nesterenko; Ukraine	20:49.0
6 kilometres	Sitting	Andrea Eskau; Germany	19:12.4	Svetlana Konovalova; Russia	19:31.1	Olena Iurkovska; Ukraine	19:39.6
6 kilometres	Standing	Alena Kaufman; Russia	18:27.2	Anna Milenina; Russia	18:57.4	Iuliia Batenkova; Ukraine	19:17.7
10 kilometres	Visually impaired	Mikhalina Lysova; Guide: Alexey Ivanov; Russia	30:11.5	Iuliia Budaleeva; Guide: Tatiana Maltseva; Russia	30:38.9	Oksana Shyshkova; Guide: Lada Nesterenko; Ukraine	35:01.4
10 kilometres	Sitting	Anja Wicker; Germany	32:54.4	Svetlana Konovalova; Russia	33:36.7	Lyudmyla Pavlenko; Ukraine	34:22.6
10 kilometres	Standing	Alena Kaufman; Russia	29:57.1	Oleksandra Kononova; Ukraine	30:33.7	Natalia Bratiuk; Russia	30:57.6
12.5 kilometres	Visually impaired	Iuliia Budaleeva; Guide: Tatiana Maltseva; Russia	35:25.9	Mikhalina Lysova; Guide: Alexey Ivanov; Russia	37:21.0	Oksana Shyshkova; Guide: Lada Nesterenko; Ukraine	37:48.8
12.5 kilometres	Sitting	Svetlana Konovalova; Russia	40:44.0	Anja Wicker; Germany	41:27.1	Olena Iurkovska; Ukraine	41:30.8
12.5 kilometres	Standing	Oleksandra Kononova; Ukraine	40:30.6	Alena Kaufman; Russia	40:32.7	Natalia Bratiuk; Russia	41:00.9

=== Men's events ===
Event	Class	Gold		Silver		Bronze	
7.5 kilometres	Visually impaired	Vitaliy Lukyanenko; Guide: Borys Babar; Ukraine	20:18.8	Nikolay Polukhin; Guide: Andrey Tokarev; Russia	20:29.8	Vasili Shaptsiaboi; Guide: Mikhail Lebedzeu; Belarus	21:06.6
7.5 kilometres	Sitting	Roman Petushkov; Russia	21:03.7	Maksym Yarovyi; Ukraine	21:11.9	Kozo Kubo; Japan	21:45.6
7.5 kilometres	Standing	Vladislav Lekomtcev; Russia	19:13.7	Mark Arendz; Canada	19:14.4	Azat Karachurin; Russia	19:14.9
12.5 kilometres	Visually impaired	Vitaliy Lukyanenko; Guide: Borys Babar; Ukraine	31:04.0	Nikolay Polukhin; Guide: Andrey Tokarev; Russia	31:14.3	Vasili Shaptsiaboi; Guide: Mikhail Lebedzeu; Belarus	31:59.0
12.5 kilometres	Sitting	Roman Petushkov; Russia	34:48.8	Alexey Bychenok; Russia	35:29.7	Grigory Murygin; Russia	35:59.6
12.5 kilometres	Standing	Azat Karachurin; Russia	29:30.0	Nils-Erik Ulset; Norway	30:24.6	Mark Arendz; Canada	30:31.0
15 kilometres	Visually impaired	Nikolay Polukhin; Guide: Andrey Tokarev; Russia	36:42.9	Anatolii Kovalevskyi; Guide: Oleksandr Mukshyn; Ukraine	38:18.2	Vitaliy Lukyanenko; Guide: Borys Babar; Ukraine; Stanislav Chokhlaev; Guide: Maksim Pirogov; Russia	38:21.6
15 kilometres	Sitting	Roman Petushkov; Russia	42:20.8	Grigory Murygin; Russia	44:25.7	Aleksandr Davidovich; Russia	44:46.2
15 kilometres	Standing	Grygorii Vovchynskyi; Ukraine	37:41.1	Nils-Erik Ulset; Norway	37:44.2	Kirill Mikhaylov; Russia	37:45.6

== Cross-country skiing ==
=== Women's events ===
Event	Class	Gold		Silver		Bronze	
1 kilometre sprint	Visually impaired	Mikhalina Lysova; Guide: Alexey Ivanov; Russia	4:11.5	Elena Remizova; Guide: Natalia Yakimova; Russia	4:17.1	Oksana Shyshkova; Guide: Lada Nesterenko; Ukraine	4:24.6
1 kilometre sprint	Sitting	Mariann Marthinsen; Norway	2:45.6	Tatyana McFadden; United States	2:45.7	Marta Zaynullina; Russia	2:46.6
1 kilometre sprint	Standing	Anna Milenina; Russia	4:26.9	Iuliia Batenkova; Ukraine	4:31.4	Alena Kaufman; Russia	4:31.7
5 kilometres	Visually impaired	Elena Remizova; Guide: Natalia Yakimova; Russia	13:23.8	Mikhalina Lysova; Guide: Alexey Ivanov; Russia	13:27.7	Iuliia Budaleeva; Guide: Tatiana Maltseva; Russia	13:28.6
5 kilometres	Sitting	Andrea Eskau; Germany	16:08.6	Lyudmyla Pavlenko; Ukraine	16:27.0	Oksana Masters; United States	17:04.8
5 kilometres	Standing	Anna Milenina; Russia	13:31.9	Iuliia Batenkova; Ukraine	13:44.4	Oleksandra Kononova; Ukraine	13:46.9
12 kilometres	Sitting	Lyudmyla Pavlenko; Ukraine	38:54:3	Oksana Masters; United States	39:16:0	Svetlana Konovalova; Russia	39:49:8
15 kilometres	Visually impaired	Elena Remizova; Guide: Natalia Yakimova; Russia	49:10.2	Mikhalina Lysova; Guide: Alexey Ivanov; Russia	50:47.5	Yadviha Skorabahataya; Guide: Iryna Nafranovich; Belarus	55:46.5
15 kilometres	Standing	Helene Ripa; Sweden	49:49.2	Iuliia Batenkova; Ukraine	49:53.1	Anna Milenina; Russia	51:27.3

=== Men's events ===
Event	Class	Gold		Silver		Bronze	
1 kilometre sprint	Visually impaired	Brian McKeever; Guide: Graham Nishikawa; Canada	3:59.6	Zebastian Modin; Guide: Albin Ackerot; Sweden	4:01.4	Oleg Ponomarev; Guide: Andrei Romanov; Russia	4:05.0
1 kilometre sprint	Sitting	Roman Petushkov; Russia	2:05.78	Grigory Murygin; Russia	2:08.67	Maksym Yarovyi; Ukraine	2:07.59
1 kilometre sprint	Standing	Kirill Mikhaylov; Russia	3:53.5	Rushan Minnegulov; Russia	3:53.8	Vladislav Lekomtcev; Russia	3:54.6
10 kilometres	Visually impaired	Brian McKeever; Guide: Erik Carleton; Canada	23:18.1	Stanislav Chokhlaev; Guide: Maksim Pirogov; Russia	23:25.1	Thomas Clarion; Guide: Julien Bourla; France	24:14.9
10 kilometres	Sitting	Chris Klebl; Canada	30:52.0	Maksym Yarovyi; Ukraine	31:06.5	Grigory Murygin; Russia	31:18.2
10 kilometres	Standing	Aleksandr Pronkov; Russia	23:59.5	Vladimir Kononov; Russia	24:00.7	Vladislav Lekomtcev; Russia	24:06.5
15 kilometres	Sitting	Roman Petushkov; Russia	40:51.6	Irek Zaripov; Russia	41:55.1	Aleksandr Davidovich; Russia	42:08.6
20 kilometres	Visually impaired	Brian McKeever; Guide: Erik Carleton; Canada	52:37.1	Stanislav Chokhlaev; Guide: Maksim Pirogov; Russia	53:43.3	Zebastian Modin; Guide: Albin Ackerot; Sweden	56:34.9
20 kilometres	Standing	Rushan Minnegulov; Russia	50:55.1	Ilkka Tuomisto; Finland	51:31.5	Vladislav Lekomtcev; Russia	51:44.6

=== Relay events ===
Event	Gold		Silver		Bronze	
4 x 2.5km Mixed Relay	Russia (RUS); Alena Kaufman; Svetlana Konovalova; Nikolay Polukhin; Guide: Andrey Tokarev; Elena Remizova; Guide: Natalia Yakimova	27:35.6	Sweden (SWE); Zebastian Modin; Guide: Albin Ackerot; Helene Ripa	27:44.3	Norway (NOR); Erik Bye; Guide: Kristian Myhre Hellerud; Mariann Marthinsen; Nils-Erik Ulset	27:53.6
4 x 2.5km Open Relay	Russia (RUS); Vladislav Lekomtcev; Rushan Minnegulov; Grigory Murygin; Roman Petushkov	24:22.8	Ukraine (UKR); Olena Iurkovska; Vitaliy Lukyanenko; Guide: Borys Babar; Ihor Reptyukh; Iurii Utkin; Guide: Vitaliy Kazakov	25:17.9	France (FRA); Thomas Clarion; Guide: Julien Bourla; Benjamin Daviet	25:30.3

== Curling ==
Event	Gold	Silver	Bronze
Mixed	Canada (CAN); Jim Armstrong; Dennis Thiessen; Ina Forrest; Sonja Gaudet; Mark Ideson	Russia (RUS); Andrei Smirnov; Alexander Shevchenko; Svetlana Pakhomova; Marat Romanov; Oksana Slesarenko	Great Britain (GBR); Aileen Neilson; Gregor Ewan; Bob McPherson; Jim Gault; Angie Malone

== Ice sledge hockey ==
Event	Gold	Silver	Bronze
Mixed	United States (USA)	Russia (RUS)	Canada (CAN)
Mixed	Tyler Carron; Steve Cash; Taylor Chace; Declan Farmer; Nikko Landeros; Jen Lee; Taylor Lipsett; Dan McCoy; Kevin McKee; Adam Page; Josh Pauls; Rico Roman; Brody Roybal; Paul Schaus; Greg Shaw; Josh Sweeney; Andy Yohe	Alexey Amosov; Maxim Andriyanov; Andrey Dvinyaninov; Mikhail Ivanov; Vladimir Kamantcev; Ivan Kuznetsov; Dmitrii Lisov; Vladimir Litvinenko; Aleksei Lysov; Evgeny Petrov; Ilia Popov; Vadim Selyukin; Konstantin Shikhov; Nikolay Terentyev; Ruslan Tuchin; Vasilii Varlakov; Ilia Volkov	Steve Arsenault; Brad Bowden; Billy Bridges; Ben Delaney; Adam Dixon; Marc Dorion; Anthony Gale; James Gemmell; Dominic Larocque; Karl Ludwig; Tyler McGregor; Graeme Murray; Kevin Rempel; Benoit St-Amand; Corbin Watson; Greg Westlake; Derek Whitson

== See also ==
- 2014 Winter Paralympics medal table
