= Russia at the 2014 Winter Paralympics =

- IPC code: RUS
- NPC: Russian Paralympic Committee
- Website: www.paralymp.ru (in Russian)

in Sochi
- Competitors: 69 in 5 sports
- Flag bearers: Valerii Redkozubov (opening); Mikhalina Lysova (closing)
- Medals Ranked 1st: Gold 30 Silver 28 Bronze 22 Total 80

Winter Paralympics appearances (overview)
- 1994; 1998; 2002; 2006; 2010; 2014; 2018–2022; 2026

Other related appearances
- Soviet Union (1988); Unified Team (1992); Neutral Paralympic Athletes (2018)

Russia competed as the host nation at the 2014 Winter Paralympics in Sochi, held between 7–16 March 2014. Russia's tally of 80 medals is the highest total ever recorded. The previous record was held by Austria with 70 medals in 1984.

In December 2014, German public broadcaster ARD aired a documentary which made wide-ranging allegations that Russia organized a state-run doping program which supplied their athletes with performance-enhancing drugs. In November 2015, Russia's track and field team was provisionally suspended by the IAAF.

In May 2016, The New York Times published allegations by the former director of Russia's anti-doping laboratory, Grigory Rodchenkov, that a conspiracy of corrupt anti-doping officials, FSB intelligence agents, and compliant Russian athletes used banned substances to gain an unfair advantage during the Games.

On 9 December 2016, Canadian lawyer Richard McLaren published the second part of his independent report. The investigation found that from 2011 to 2015, more than 1,000 Russian competitors in various sports (including summer, winter, and Paralympic sports) benefited from the cover-up. Emails indicate that they included five blind powerlifters, who may have been given drugs without their knowledge, and a fifteen-year-old.

== Alpine skiing ==
Men

Athlete	Event	Run 1			Run 2			Final/Total		
Athlete	Event	Time	Diff	Rank	Time	Diff	Rank	Time	Diff	Rank
Aleksandr Akhmadulin	Slalom, sitting	DNF								
Aleksandr Akhmadulin	Giant slalom, sitting	DNF								
Alexander Alyabyev	Downhill, standing	—N/a						1:28.70	+4.35	11
Alexander Alyabyev	Super-G, standing	—N/a						DNF		
Alexander Alyabyev	Combined, standing	DNF								
Alexander Alyabyev	Slalom, standing	48.69	+1.00	3	52.05	+0.77	2	1:40.74	+1.77	3rd place, bronze medalist(s)
Alexander Alyabyev	Giant slalom, standing	DNF								
Alexey Bugaev	Downhill, standing	—N/a						1:24.41	+0.06	2nd place, silver medalist(s)
Alexey Bugaev	Super-G, standing	—N/a						1:22.30	+1.38	3rd place, bronze medalist(s)
Alexey Bugaev	Combined, standing	50.30	-	1	1:19.42	+1.03	2	2:09.72	-	1st place, gold medalist(s)
Alexey Bugaev	Slalom, standing	47.69	-	1	51.28	-	1	1:38.97	-	1st place, gold medalist(s)
Alexey Bugaev	Giant slalom, standing	1:16.15	+1.43	3	1:11.72	+0.57	2	2:27.87	+2.00	2nd place, silver medalist(s)
Alexander Fedoruk; Guide: Artem Zagorodskikh	Slalom, visually impaired	1:00.20	+10.51	13	1:03.97	+10.45	9	2:04.17	+20.96	9
Alexander Fedoruk; Guide: Artem Zagorodskikh	Giant slalom, visually impaired	1:28.48	+12.46	14	1:26.48	+13.23	12	2:54.96	+25.34	12
Ivan Frantsev; Guide: German Agranovskii	Downhill, visually impaired	—N/a						1:30.67	+8.91	9
Ivan Frantsev; Guide: German Agranovskii	Super-G, visually impaired	—N/a						1:26.00	+5.42	5
Ivan Frantsev; Guide: German Agranovskii	Combined, visually impaired	DNF								
Ivan Frantsev; Guide: German Agranovskii	Slalom, visually impaired	DNF								
Ivan Frantsev; Guide: German Agranovskii	Giant slalom, visually impaired	1:21.51	+5.49	7	1:19.27	+6.02	9	2:40.78	+11.16	6
Valerii Redkozubov; Guide: Evgeny Geroev	Super-G, visually impaired	—N/a						1:26.66	+6.08	6
Valerii Redkozubov; Guide: Evgeny Geroev	Combined, visually impaired	50.60	-	1	1:25.27	+7.81	4	2:15.87	-	1st place, gold medalist(s)
Valerii Redkozubov; Guide: Evgeny Geroev	Slalom, visually impaired	49.69	-	1	53.52	-	1	1:43.21	-	1st place, gold medalist(s)
Valerii Redkozubov; Guide: Evgeny Geroev	Giant slalom, visually impaired	1:19.91	+3.89	4	1:13.66	+0.41	3	2:33.57	+3.95	3rd place, bronze medalist(s)
Nikolai Shuvalov	Slalom, sitting	DNF								
Nikolai Shuvalov	Giant slalom, sitting	1:41.94	+23.84	28	1:40.46	+26.36	21	3:22.40	+49.67	21
Alexander Vetrov	Downhill, standing	—N/a						1:30.19	+5.84	13
Alexander Vetrov	Super-G, standing	—N/a						1:26.36	+5.44	11
Alexander Vetrov	Combined, standing	DNF								
Alexander Vetrov	Slalom, standing	54.52	+6.83	19	57.55	+6.27	12	1:52.07	+13.10	12
Alexander Vetrov	Giant slalom, standing	1:19.21	+4.49	8	DNF					

Women

Athlete	Event	Run 1			Run 2			Final/Total		
Athlete	Event	Time	Diff	Rank	Time	Diff	Rank	Time	Diff	Rank
Alexandra Frantseva; Guide: Pavel Zabotin	Downhill, visually impaired	—N/a						1:35.78	+4.23	3rd place, bronze medalist(s)
Alexandra Frantseva; Guide: Pavel Zabotin	Super-G, visually impaired	—N/a						1:28.94	+0.22	2nd place, silver medalist(s)
Alexandra Frantseva; Guide: Pavel Zabotin	Combined, visually impaired	58.68	-	1	1:29.07	+2.49	2	2:27.75	-	1st place, gold medalist(s)
Alexandra Frantseva; Guide: Pavel Zabotin	Slalom, visually impaired	1:01.42	+0.55	2	59.82	-	1	2:01.24	-	1st place, gold medalist(s)
Alexandra Frantseva; Guide: Pavel Zabotin	Giant slalom, visually impaired	1:33.58	+4.96	2	1:21.33	+1.32	2	2:54.91	+6.28	2nd place, silver medalist(s)
Anastasia Khorosheva	Slalom, sitting	1:26.42	+27.05	11	1:14.79	+14.31	11	2:41.21	+41.36	11
Anastasia Khorosheva	Giant slalom, sitting	1:39.55	+14.57	14	1:28.27	+14.41	13	3:07.82	+28.98	13
Inga Medvedeva	Downhill, standing	—N/a						1:32.19	+1.47	2nd place, silver medalist(s)
Inga Medvedeva	Super-G, standing	—N/a						DSQ		
Inga Medvedeva	Combined, standing	1:00.86	+7.38	4	1:29.06	+4.15	5	2:29.92	+11.53	5
Inga Medvedeva	Slalom, standing	1:03.69	+4.32	4	1:03.01	+2.53	3	2:06.70	+6.85	2nd place, silver medalist(s)
Inga Medvedeva	Giant slalom, standing	1:33.17	+8.19	8	1:19.77	+5.91	6	2:52.94	+14.10	6
Mariia Papulova	Downhill, standing	—N/a						1:41.37	+10.65	5
Mariia Papulova	Super-G, standing	—N/a						1:31.53	+7.33	5
Mariia Papulova	Combined, standing	DNF								
Mariia Papulova	Slalom, standing	1:02.83	+3.46	3	1:06.47	+5.99	6	2:09.30	+9.45	4
Mariia Papulova	Giant slalom, standing	1:31.17	+6.19	6	DNF					

=== Snowboarding ===
Para-snowboarding is making its debut at the Winter Paralympics and it will be placed under the Alpine skiing program during the 2014 Games.

Men

Athlete	Event	Race 1		Race 2		Race 3		Total	
Athlete	Event	Time	Rank	Time	Rank	Time	Rank	Time	Rank
Kirill Finkelman	Snowboard cross	DSQ		1:24.57	29	1:23.94	27	2:48.51	31
Aleksandr Ilinov	Snowboard cross	1:15.81	23	1:15.62	24	1:14.90	23	2:30.52	27
Igor Ivanov	Snowboard cross	1:19.55	25	1:23.93	28	1:37.24	31	2:43.48	29

== Biathlon ==
Men

Athlete	Events	Final				
Athlete	Events	Real Time	Calculated Time	Missed Shots	Result	Rank
Alexsander Artemov; Guide: Ilya Cherepanov	7.5km, visually impaired	25:54.7	22:32.6	0+0	22:32.6	9
Alexsander Artemov; Guide: Ilya Cherepanov	15km, visually impaired	46:29.5	41:26.9	1+0+0+0	41:26.9	8
Alexey Bychenok	7.5km, sitting	21:58.2	21:58.2	1+0	21:58.2	5
Alexey Bychenok	12.5km, sitting	35:29.7	35:29.7	0+0+0+0	35:29.7	2nd place, silver medalist(s)
Stanislav Chokhlaev; Guide: Maksim Pirogov	7.5km, visually impaired	24:31.4	21:20.1	1+0	21:20.1	5
Stanislav Chokhlaev; Guide: Maksim Pirogov	15km, visually impaired	42:56.5	38:21.6	0+1+0+0	38:21.6	3rd place, bronze medalist(s)
Aleksandr Davidovich	15km, sitting	44:46.2	44:46.2	0+0+0+0	44:46.2	3rd place, bronze medalist(s)
Ivan Goncharov	7.5km, sitting	23:17.3	22:35.4	0+0	22:35.4	7
Ivan Goncharov	12.5km, sitting	37:50.6	36:42.5	0+0+0+0	36:42.5	4
Ivan Goncharov	15km, sitting	46:52.4	45:28.0	0+0+0+0	45:28.0	5
Aleksandr Iaremchuk	7.5km, standing	20:15.8	19:27.2	1+0	19:27.2	5
Aleksandr Iaremchuk	12.5km, standing	32:48.0	31:29.3	0+1+0+1	31:29.3	8
Aleksandr Iaremchuk	15km, standing	39:21.3	39:46.8	1+0+0+1	39:46.8	7
Azat Karachurin	7.5km, standing	21:52.4	19:14.9	0+1	19:14.9	3rd place, bronze medalist(s)
Azat Karachurin	12.5km, standing	33:31.4	29:30.0	0+0+0+1	29:30.0	1st place, gold medalist(s)
Azat Karachurin	15km, standing	42:17.0	38:12.6	0+0+1+0	38:12.6	4
Ivan Kodlozerov	7.5km, standing	20:16.2	19:39.7	1+1	19:39.7	9
Ivan Kodlozerov	12.5km, standing	32:04.8	31:07.1	1+0+0+0	31:07.1	5
Ivan Kodlozerov	15km, standing	40:19.6	40:07.0	0+1+0+0	40:07.0	8
Vladislav Lekomtcev	7.5km, standing	20:01.8	19:13.7	0+1	19:13.7	1st place, gold medalist(s)
Vladislav Lekomtcev	15km, standing	38:21.2	38:49.2	0+2+0+0	38:49.2	5
Kirill Mikhaylov	7.5km, standing	20:02.3	19:26.2	1+0	19:26.2	4
Kirill Mikhaylov	12.5km, standing	32:07.1	31:09.3	1+0+1+1	31:09.3	6
Kirill Mikhaylov	15km, standing	38:55.7	37:45.6	0+0+0+0	37:45.6	3rd place, bronze medalist(s)
Grigory Murygin	12.5km, sitting	35:59.6	35:59.6	1+0+0+1	35:59.6	3rd place, bronze medalist(s)
Grigory Murygin	15km, sitting	44:25.7	44:25.7	0+1+0+1	44:25.7	2nd place, silver medalist(s)
Roman Petushkov	7.5km, sitting	21:03.7	21:03.7	0+0	21:03.7	1st place, gold medalist(s)
Roman Petushkov	12.5km, sitting	34:48.8	34:48.8	0+0+0+0	34:48.8	1st place, gold medalist(s)
Roman Petushkov	15km, sitting	42:20.8	42:20.8	0+0+0+0	42:20.8	1st place, gold medalist(s)
Nikolay Polukhin; Guide:Andrey Tokarev	7.5km, visually impaired	20:18.8	20:18.8	0+0	20:18.8	2nd place, silver medalist(s)
Nikolay Polukhin; Guide:Andrey Tokarev	12.5km, visually impaired	31:52.6	31:14.3	0+0+1+0	31:14.3	2nd place, silver medalist(s)
Nikolay Polukhin; Guide:Andrey Tokarev	15km, visually impaired	37:27.9	36:42.9	0+0+0+0	36:42.9	1st place, gold medalist(s)
Oleg Ponomarev; Guide: Andrei Romanov	7.5km, visually impaired	22:37.1	22:37.1	0+2	22:37.1	10
Oleg Ponomarev; Guide: Andrei Romanov	12.5km, visually impaired	32:57.7	32:57.7	0+0+0+0	32:57.7	5
Oleg Ponomarev; Guide: Andrei Romanov	15km, visually impaired	40:35.0	42:35.0	1+0+0+1	42:35.0	10
Aleksandr Pronkov	7.5km, standing	22:25.9	19:44.4	1+1	19:44.4	10
Aleksandr Pronkov	12.5km, standing	34:48.3	30:37.7	0+0+0+2	30:37.7	4
Aleksandr Pronkov	15km, standing	42:06.8	39:03.6	0+1+0+1	39:03.6	6
Vladimir Udaltcov; Guide: Ruslan Bogachev	7.5km, visually impaired	23:26.6	23:26.6	0+2	23:26.6	12
Vladimir Udaltcov; Guide: Ruslan Bogachev	12.5km, visually impaired	DNS				
Irek Zaripov	7.5km, sitting	23:35.8	23:35.8	1+3	23:35.8	10

Women

Athlete	Events	Final				
Athlete	Events	Real Time	Calculated Time	Missed Shots	Result	Rank
Akzhana Abdikarimova	6km, sitting	26:35.0	23:55.5	1+3	23:55.5	10
Akzhana Abdikarimova	10km, sitting	39:06.0	35:11.4	0+0+0+0	35:11.4	5
Akzhana Abdikarimova	12.5km, sitting	48:01.3	43:13.2	0+0+0+0	43:13.2	5
Nadezda Andreeva	12.5km, sitting	44:03.4	51:03.4	1+3+2+1	51:03.4	9
Natalia Bratiuk	6km, standing	22:03.7	21:24.0	1+1	21:24.0	9
Natalia Bratiuk	10km, standing	31:55.0	30:57.6	0+0+0+1	30:57.6	3rd place, bronze medalist(s)
Natalia Bratiuk	12.5km, standing	42:17.0	41:00.9	0+0+0+0	41:00.9	3rd place, bronze medalist(s)
Iuliia Budaleeva; Guide: Tatiana Maltseva	6km, visually impaired	20:56.8	20:31.7	2+0	20:31.7	2nd place, silver medalist(s)
Iuliia Budaleeva; Guide: Tatiana Maltseva	10km, visually impaired	31:16.4	30:38.9	1+0+0+0	30:38.9	2nd place, silver medalist(s)
Iuliia Budaleeva; Guide: Tatiana Maltseva	12.5km, visually impaired	36:09.3	35:25.9	0+0+0+0	35:25.9	1st place, gold medalist(s)
Maria Iovleva	6km, sitting	20:25.1	20:25.1	0+2	20:25.1	8
Maria Iovleva	10km, sitting	DSQ				
Alena Kaufman	6km, standing	19:01.4	18:27.2	0+0	18:27.2	1st place, gold medalist(s)
Alena Kaufman	10km, standing	30:52.7	29:57.1	1+0+0+0	29:57.1	1st place, gold medalist(s)
Alena Kaufman	12.5km, standing	40:46.1	40:32.7	0+0+1+0	40:32.7	2nd place, silver medalist(s)
Svetlana Konovalova	6km, sitting	19:31.1	19:31.1	1+0	19:31.1	2nd place, silver medalist(s)
Svetlana Konovalova	10km, sitting	33:36.7	33:36.7	0+0+1+1	33:36.7	2nd place, silver medalist(s)
Svetlana Konovalova	12.5km, sitting	40:44.0	40:44.0	0+0+0+0	40:44.0	1st place, gold medalist(s)
Mikhalina Lysova; Guide: Alexey Ivanov	6km, visually impaired	20:27.8	20:03.2	0+0	20:03.2	1st place, gold medalist(s)
Mikhalina Lysova; Guide: Alexey Ivanov	10km, visually impaired	30:48.5	30:11.5	0+1+0+1	30:11.5	1st place, gold medalist(s)
Mikhalina Lysova; Guide: Alexey Ivanov	12.5km, visually impaired	37:05.5	37:21.0	0+0+0+1	37:21.0	2nd place, silver medalist(s)
Anna Milenina	6km, standing	19:32.6	18:57.4	1+1	18:57.4	2nd place, silver medalist(s)
Anna Milenina	10km, standing	33:13.6	32:13.8	2+0+1+1	32:13.8	6
Anna Milenina	12.5km, standing	40:26.9	41:14.1	0+1+0+1	41:14.1	4
Elena Remizova; Guide: Natalia Yakimova	6km, visually impaired	21:34.7	21:08.8	2+0	21:08.8	4
Elena Remizova; Guide: Natalia Yakimova	12.5km, visually impaired	37:59.4	38:13.8	0+0+1+0	38:13.8	4
Marta Zaynullina	6km, sitting	19:50.1	19:50.1	0+0	19:50.1	5
Marta Zaynullina	10km, sitting	36:22.4	36:22.4	0+0+2+2	36:22.4	6
Marta Zaynullina	12.5km, sitting	42:07.4	43:07.4	1+0+0+0	43:07.4	4

== Cross-country skiing ==
Men

Athlete	Event	Qualification			Semifinal		Final		
Athlete	Event	Real Time	Result	Rank	Result	Rank	Real Time	Result	Rank
Alexsander Artemov; Guide: Ilya Cherepanov	1km sprint classic, visually impaired	4:20.26	3:46.43	7Q	4:21.8	4	did not advance		
Alexsander Artemov; Guide: Ilya Cherepanov	10km free, visually impaired	—N/a					30:10.4	26:15.0	9
Alexsander Artemov; Guide: Ilya Cherepanov	20km, visually impaired	—N/a					1:06:35.1	57:55.7	4
Stanislav Chokhlaev; Guide: Maksim Pirogov	1km sprint classic, visually impaired	4:13.21	3:40.29	4Q	4:11.0	3	did not advance		
Stanislav Chokhlaev; Guide: Maksim Pirogov	10km free, visually impaired	—N/a					26:55.1	23:25.1	2nd place, silver medalist(s)
Stanislav Chokhlaev; Guide: Maksim Pirogov	20km, visually impaired	—N/a					1:01:44.9	53:43.3	2nd place, silver medalist(s)
Aleksandr Davidovich	15km, sitting	—N/a					42:08.6	42:08.6	3rd place, bronze medalist(s)
Ivan Goncharov	1km sprint classic, sitting	2:21.90	2:17.64	8Q	2:33.5	6	did not advance		
Ivan Goncharov	10km free, sitting	—N/a					35:18.2	34:14.7	15
Aleksandr Iaremchuk	10km free, standing	—N/a					26:50.7	25:46.3	14
Azat Karachurin	1km sprint classic, standing	4:16.64	3:45.84	8Q	4:16.6	5	did not advance		
Azat Karachurin	10km free, standing	—N/a					28:45.4	25:18.4	12
Ivan Kodlozerov	1km sprint classic, standing	4:02.85	3:55.56	13	did not qualify				
Vladimir Kononov	1km sprint classic, standing	4:15.79	3:45.10	7Q	4:06.6	2Q	RAL		
Vladimir Kononov	10km free, standing	—N/a					27:17.2	24:00.7	2nd place, silver medalist(s)
Vladimir Kononov	20km, standing	—N/a					1:10:25.2	57:02.4	8
Sergey Lapkin	1km sprint classic, standing	3:42.06	3:35.40	1Q	4:08.1	1Q	4:14.9	4:14.9	5
Sergey Lapkin	10km free, standing	—N/a					26:00.3	25:13.5	9
Vladislav Lekomtcev	1km sprint classic, standing	3:48.38	3:39.25	3Q	4:05.4	1Q	3:54.6	3:54.6	3rd place, bronze medalist(s)
Vladislav Lekomtcev	10km free, standing	—N/a					25:06.8	24:06.5	3rd place, bronze medalist(s)
Vladislav Lekomtcev	20km, standing	—N/a					57:29.5	51:44.6	3rd place, bronze medalist(s)
Kirill Mikhaylov	1km sprint classic, standing	3:50.92	3:43.99	5Q	4:09.3	3Q	3:53.5	3:53.5	1st place, gold medalist(s)
Kirill Mikhaylov	10km free, standing	—N/a					25:15.0	24:29.6	5
Kirill Mikhaylov	20km, standing	—N/a					58:52.9	56:31.6	7
Rushan Minnegulov	1km sprint classic, standing	3:46.86	3:40.05	4Q	4:08.3	2Q	3:53.8	3:53.8	2nd place, silver medalist(s)
Rushan Minnegulov	10km free, standing	—N/a					25:02.6	24:17.5	4
Rushan Minnegulov	20km, standing	—N/a					55:57.3	50:55.1	1st place, gold medalist(s)
Grigory Murygin	1km sprint classic, sitting	2:08.67	2:08.67	3Q	2:26.7	1Q	2:30.6	2:30.6	2nd place, silver medalist(s)
Grigory Murygin	10km free, sitting	—N/a					31:18.2	31:18.2	3rd place, bronze medalist(s)
Roman Petushkov	1km sprint classic, sitting	2:05.78	2:05.78	1Q	2:19.7	1Q	2:29.4	2:29.4	1st place, gold medalist(s)
Roman Petushkov	10km free, sitting	—N/a					31:22.5	31:22.5	4
Roman Petushkov	15km, sitting	—N/a					40:51.6	40:51.6	1st place, gold medalist(s)
Nikolay Polukhin; Guide: Andrey Tokarev	1km sprint classic, visually impaired	3:55.63	3:50.92	9	did not qualify				
Nikolay Polukhin; Guide: Andrey Tokarev	10km free, visually impaired	—N/a					25:13.4	24:43.1	4
Oleg Ponomarev; Guide: Andrei Romanov	1km sprint classic, visually impaired	3:32.93	3:32.93	2Q	4:16.6	2Q	4:05.0	4:05.0	3rd place, bronze medalist(s)
Oleg Ponomarev; Guide: Andrei Romanov	10km free, visually impaired	—N/a					27:12.7	27:12.7	12
Oleg Ponomarev; Guide: Andrei Romanov	20km, visually impaired	—N/a					DNS		
Aleksandr Pronkov	1km sprint classic, standing	4:07.62	3:37.91	2Q	4:10.2	3Q	4:03.7	4:03.7	4
Aleksandr Pronkov	10km free, standing	—N/a					27:16.2	23:59.9	1st place, gold medalist(s)
Vladimir Udaltcov; Guide: Ruslan Bogachev	1km sprint classic, visually impaired	3:42.40	3:42.40	5Q	4:10.7	2Q	4:23.0	4:23.0	4
Vladimir Udaltcov; Guide: Ruslan Bogachev	10km free, visually impaired	—N/a					27:26.3	27:26.3	13
Vladimir Udaltcov; Guide: Ruslan Bogachev	20km, visually impaired	—N/a					58:22.9	58:22.9	5
Irek Zaripov	1km sprint classic, sitting	2:11.66	2:11.66	4Q	2:20.2	2Q	2:32.3	2:32.3	4
Irek Zaripov	10km free, sitting	—N/a					32:25.2	32:25.2	7
Irek Zaripov	15km, sitting	—N/a					41:55.1	41:55.1	2nd place, silver medalist(s)

Women

Athlete	Event	Qualification			Semifinal		Final		
Athlete	Event	Real Time	Result	Rank	Result	Rank	Real Time	Result	Rank
Akzhana Abdikarimova	1km sprint classic, sitting	3:06.85	2:48.17	14	did not qualify				
Akzhana Abdikarimova	5km, sitting	—N/a					21:42.4	19:32.2	18
Akzhana Abdikarimova	12km, sitting	—N/a					48:47.1	43:54.4	14
Nadezda Andreeva	12km, sitting	—N/a					44:25.9	44:25.9	15
Natalia Bratiuk	1km sprint classic, standing	5:02.77	4:53.69	8Q	4:44.0	1Q	4:48.7	4:48.7	6
Natalia Bratiuk	5km, standing	—N/a					15:00.6	14:33.6	7
Iuliia Budaleeva; Guide: Tatiana Maltseva	1km sprint classic, visually impaired	4:29.68	4:24.29	2Q	5:35.4	2Q	4:32.1	4:32.1	4
Iuliia Budaleeva; Guide: Tatiana Maltseva	5km, visually impaired	—N/a					13:45.1	13:28.6	3rd place, bronze medalist(s)
Maria Iovleva	1km sprint classic, sitting	2:37.59	2:37.59	5Q	3:03.9	4	did not advance		
Maria Iovleva	5km, sitting	—N/a					17:36.8	17:36.8	8
Alena Kaufman	1km sprint classic, standing	4:53.74	4:44.93	4Q	4:49.9	3Q	4:31.7	4:31.7	3rd place, bronze medalist(s)
Alena Kaufman	5km, standing	—N/a					14:16.7	13:51.0	4
Alena Kaufman	15km, standing	—N/a					57:18.9	52:09.4	5
Natalia Kocherova	1km sprint classic, sitting	2:45.97	2:45.97	12Q	3:02.0	3Q	2:49.0	2:49.0	5
Natalia Kocherova	12km, sitting	—N/a					42:24.6	42:24.6	5
Svetlana Konovalova	5km, sitting	—N/a					17:23.4	17:23.4	5
Svetlana Konovalova	12km, sitting	—N/a					39:49.8	39:49.8	3rd place, bronze medalist(s)
Mikhalina Lysova; Guide: Alexey Ivanov	1km sprint classic, visually impaired	4:24.40	4:19.11	1Q	4:50.3	1Q	4:11.5	4:11.5	1st place, gold medalist(s)
Mikhalina Lysova; Guide: Alexey Ivanov	5km, visually impaired	—N/a					13:44.2	13:27.7	2nd place, silver medalist(s)
Mikhalina Lysova; Guide: Alexey Ivanov	15km, visually impaired	—N/a					51:49.7	50:47.5	2nd place, silver medalist(s)
Anna Milenina	1km sprint classic, standing	4:46.31	4:37.72	2Q	4:48.9	2Q	4:26.9	4:26.9	1st place, gold medalist(s)
Anna Milenina	5km, standing	—N/a					13:57.0	13:31.9	1st place, gold medalist(s)
Anna Milenina	15km, standing	—N/a					56:32.6	51:27.3	3rd place, bronze medalist(s)
Elena Remizova; Guide: Natalia Yakimova	1km sprint classic, visually impaired	4:30.34	4:24.93	3Q	5:33.7	1Q	4:17.1	4:17.1	2nd place, silver medalist(s)
Elena Remizova; Guide: Natalia Yakimova	5km, visually impaired	—N/a					13:40.2	13:23.8	1st place, gold medalist(s)
Elena Remizova; Guide: Natalia Yakimova	15km, visually impaired	—N/a					50:10.4	49:10.2	1st place, gold medalist(s)
Marta Zaynullina	1km sprint classic, sitting	2:37.89	2:37.89	6Q	2:55.1	3Q	2:46.6	2:46.6	3rd place, bronze medalist(s)
Marta Zaynullina	5km, sitting	—N/a					17:21.6	17:21.6	4

Relay

Athletes	Event	Final	
Athletes	Event	Time	Rank
Vladislav Lekomtcev; Rushan Minnegulov; Grigory Murygin; Roman Petushkov	4 x 2.5km open relay	24:22.8	1st place, gold medalist(s)
Svetlana Konovalova; Nikolay Polukhin; Guide: Andrey Tokarev; Elena Remizova; Guide: Natalia Yakimova	4 x 2.5km mixed relay	27:35.6	1st place, gold medalist(s)

== Ice sledge hockey ==
Team roster

Head coach: (Russia) Sergey Samoylov Assistant coaches: (Russia) Nikolay Sharshukov, (Russia) Andrey Ivanov

No.	Pos.	Name	Birthdate	Birthplace	Club
1	G	Mikhail Ivanov	29 March 1983	Lipetsk, Soviet Union	Fenix
2	D	Aleksei Lysov	21 November 1976	Leningrad, Soviet Union	Udmurtia
4	D	Maxim Andriyanov	28 May 1980	Shcherbinka, Soviet Union	Fenix
5	D	Vasily Varlakov	30 July 1985	Chelyabinsk, Soviet Union	Yugra
6	D	Vladimir Litvinenko	1 June 1989	Kemerovo, Soviet Union	Yugra
8	F	Dmitry Lisov	23 October 1990	Domodedovo, Soviet Union	Fenix
9	F	Konstantin Shikhov	7 August 1984	Mozhga, Soviet Union	Yugra
10	F	Ruslan Tuchin	3 October 1977	Kovrov, Soviet Union	Udmurtia
11	F	Alexey Amosov	22 March 1981	Belopashino, Arkhangelsk Oblast, Soviet Union	Fenix
14	F	Ilia Popov	17 May 1982	Obninsk, Soviet Union	Fenix
16	F	Andrey Dvinyaninov	3 September 1985	Izevsk, Soviet Union	Udmurtia
17	D	Vadim Selyukin	26 March 1977	Kiselyovsk, Soviet Union	Fenix
19	D	Ivan Kuznetsov	16 January 1986	Nynek, Udmurt ASSR, Soviet Union	Udmurtia
20	G	Vladimir Kamantsev	12 May 1979	Izevsk, Soviet Union	Udmurtia
21	F	Evgeny Petrov	19 February 1990	Izevsk, Soviet Union	Udmurtia
22	F	Nikolay Terentyev	21 March 1996	Apatity	Yugra
23	F	Ilia Volkov	4 September 1985	Taboshar, Tajik SSR, Soviet Union	Fenix

Summary

Key:

- OT – Overtime
- GWS – Match decided by penalty-shootout

Team	Group Stage				Semifinal / Pl.	Final / BM / Pl.	
Team	Opposition Score	Opposition Score	Opposition Score	Rank	Opposition Score	Opposition Score	Rank
Russia	South Korea; L 2–3 GWS	Italy; W 7–0	United States; W 2–1	1 QS	Norway; W 4–0	United States; L 0–1	2nd place, silver medalist(s)

Preliminary round

Pos	Team	Pld	W	OTW	OTL	L	GF	GA	GD	Pts	Qualification
1	Russia (H)	3	2	0	1	0	11	4	+7	7	Semifinals
2	United States	3	2	0	0	1	9	3	+6	6	Semifinals
3	Italy	3	1	0	0	2	3	13	−10	3	5–8th place semifinals
4	South Korea	3	0	1	0	2	4	7	−3	2	5–8th place semifinals

Source: Sochi 2014
(H) Host

8 March 2014; 20:00	Russia	2–3 GWS (1–0, 1–1, 0–1) (OT: 0–0) (SO: 0–1)	South Korea	Shayba Arena; Attendance: 3,815

Game reference

Mikhail Ivanov
Goalies
Yu Man-gyun
Referee:
(United States) Derek Berkebile
Linesmen:
(Norway) Espen Nyberget
(Czech Republic) Leon Wesley

Varlakov (Amosov, Petrov) – 14:19	1–0
Petrov (Varlakov) – 29:03	2–0
	2–1	29:24 – Han (Jung, Park W.) (PP)
	2–2	32:12 – Cho B. (Jung, Park W.) (PP)

Selyukin (miss)
Lisov
Petrov
Lisov (miss)
Shootout
Cho Y.
Jung
(miss) Lee Jo.
Han
6 min
Penalties
6 min
21
Shots
9

9 March 2014; 20:00	Russia	7–0 (1–0, 4–0, 2–0)	Italy	Shayba Arena; Attendance: 5,638

Game reference

Vladimir Kamantsev
Goalies
Santino Stillitano
Gabriele Araudo
Referee:
(United States) Johnathan Morrison
Linesmen:
(Netherlands) Louis Beelen
(Poland) Tomasz Heltman

Popov (Selyukin) – 12:04	1–0
Amosov (Petrov) – 18:30	2–0
Dvinyaninov (Popov, Varlakov) – 22:01	3–0
Dvinyaninov (Popov, Varlakov) – 26:25	4–0
Litvinenko (Petrov, Lysov) – 28:49	5–0
Dvinyaninov (Petrov) (PP) – 31:20	6–0
Volkov (Dvinyaninov, Litvinenko) (PP) – 38:38	7–0

2 min
Penalties
4 min
10
Shots
13

11 March 2014; 16:30	United States	1–2 (0–1, 0–1, 1–0)	Russia	Shayba Arena; Attendance: 5,765

Game reference

Steve Cash
Goalies
Vladimir Kamantsev
Referee:
(Norway) Petter Hegle
Linesmen:
(Netherlands) Louis Beelen
(Czech Republic) Leon Wesley

	0–1	11:57 – Volkov (Kuznetsov, Lisov) (PP2)
	0–2	17:37 – Shikhov (Varlakov)
Page (Landeros, Yohe) – 34:50	1–2

6 min
Penalties
6 min
23
Shots
10

Semifinal

13 March 2014; 13:00	Russia	4–0 (2–0, 0–0, 2–0)	Norway	Shayba Arena; Attendance: 5,246

Game reference

Vladimir Kamantsev
Goalies
Kristian Buen
Referee:
(United States) Jonhnathan Morrison
Linesmen:
(Canada) Matthew Clark
(United States) Brian Frerichs

Lisov (Shikhov) – 05:40	1–0
Amosov (Shikhov, Dvinyaninov) – 12:55	2–0
Terentyev (Shikhov) – 34:27	3–0
Petrov (Kuznetsov) (ENG) – 44:23	4–0

4 min
Penalties
6 min
20
Shots
6

Final

15 March 2014; 20:00	United States	1–0 (0–0, 1–0, 0–0)	Russia	Shayba Arena; Attendance: 6,825

Game reference
Steve Cash	Goalies	Vladimir Kamantsev	Referee: (Canada) Paul Boese; Linesmen: (Canada) Matthew Clark (Czech Republic) Leon Wesley
Sweeney – 24:28 / 1–0			Referee: (Canada) Paul Boese; Linesmen: (Canada) Matthew Clark (Czech Republic) Leon Wesley
4 min	Penalties	2 min	Referee: (Canada) Paul Boese; Linesmen: (Canada) Matthew Clark (Czech Republic) Leon Wesley
4	Shots	6	Referee: (Canada) Paul Boese; Linesmen: (Canada) Matthew Clark (Czech Republic) Leon Wesley

== Wheelchair curling ==
Team

Position	Curler
Skip	Andrei Smirnov
Third	Alexander Shevchenko
Second	Svetlana Pakhomova
Lead	Marat Romanov
Alternate	Oksana Slesarenko

Standings

Final round robin standings
Team	Skip	Pld	W	L	PF	PA	Qualification
Russia	Andrei Smirnov	9	8	1	60	38	Playoffs
Canada	Jim Armstrong	9	7	2	66	42	Playoffs
China	Wang Haitao	9	5	4	54	45	Playoffs
Great Britain	Aileen Neilson	9	5	4	53	56	Playoffs
United States	Patrick McDonald	9	4	5	56	52	
Slovakia	Radoslav Ďuriš	9	4	5	47	68	
Sweden	Jalle Jungnell	9	4	5	59	49	
Norway	Rune Lorentsen	9	3	6	47	62	
South Korea	Kim Myung-jin	9	3	6	41	74	
Finland	Markku Karjalainen	9	2	7	61	58	

Results

Draw 1

Saturday, March 8, 9:30

Sheet A	1	2	3	4	5	6	7	8	Final
Russia (Smirnov) 🔨	0	1	1	0	1	1	0	1	5
China (Wang)	1	0	0	1	0	0	2	0	4

Draw 2

Saturday, March 8, 15:30

Sheet B	1	2	3	4	5	6	7	8	Final
Canada (Armstrong) 🔨	0	1	0	2	0	1	0	1	5
Russia (Smirnov)	1	0	1	0	1	0	1	0	4

Draw 3

Saturday, March 9, 9:30

Sheet D	1	2	3	4	5	6	7	8	Final
Finland (Karjalainen) 🔨	1	0	0	1	0	2	0	X	4
Russia (Smirnov)	0	1	1	0	2	0	3	X	7

Draw 5

Monday, March 10, 9:30

Sheet A	1	2	3	4	5	6	7	8	Final
South Korea (Kim)	1	0	2	0	0	0	2	0	5
Russia (Smirnov) 🔨	0	1	0	1	1	1	0	3	7

Draw 6

Monday, March 10, 15:30

Sheet C	1	2	3	4	5	6	7	8	Final
Russia (Smirnov)	2	1	0	2	0	1	0	0	6
United States (McDonald) 🔨	0	0	1	0	1	0	1	2	5

Draw 7

Tuesday, March 11, 9:30

Sheet B	1	2	3	4	5	6	7	8	Final
Russia (Smirnov) 🔨	0	1	2	0	0	4	0	X	7
Sweden (Jungnell)	1	0	0	1	1	0	1	X	4

Draw 9

Wednesday, March 12, 9:30

Sheet D	1	2	3	4	5	6	7	8	Final
Russia (Smirnov) 🔨	0	2	2	0	2	0	5	X	11
Great Britain (Neilson)	0	0	0	1	0	1	0	X	2

Draw 10

Thursday, March 12, 15:30

Sheet C	1	2	3	4	5	6	7	8	Final
Norway (Lorentsen) 🔨	1	0	2	0	2	0	0	0	5
Russia (Smirnov)	0	2	0	1	0	1	1	1	6

Draw 12

Thursday, March 13, 15:30

Sheet B	1	2	3	4	5	6	7	8	Final
Slovakia (Ďuriš) 🔨	1	0	1	0	1	1	0	0	4
Russia (Smirnov)	0	1	0	1	0	0	3	2	7

Semifinal

Saturday, March 15, 9:30

Team	1	2	3	4	5	6	7	8	Final
Russia (Smirnov) 🔨	1	3	0	7	1	0	1	X	13
Great Britain (Neilson)	0	0	3	0	0	1	0	X	4

Gold Medal Game

Saturday, March 15, 15:30

Team	1	2	3	4	5	6	7	8	Final
Russia (Smirnov) 🔨	2	0	0	0	0	0	1	X	3
Canada (Armstrong)	0	1	1	2	1	3	0	X	8

== See also ==
- Russia at the Paralympics
- Russia at the 2014 Winter Olympics
