= Cross-country skiing at the 2014 Winter Paralympics – Men's 1 km Sprint Classic =

Paralympic event

Men's 1km Sprint Classic at the XI Paralympic Winter Games
- Paralympic cross-country skiing
- Venue: Laura Biathlon & Ski Complex, Krasnaya Polyana, Russia
- Dates: 12 March

Men's 1 km sprint (visually impaired) at the XI Paralympic Winter Games
- Competitors: 18 from 12 nations

Medalists
1st place, gold medalist(s)		Brian McKeever; Guide: Erik Carleton	Canada
2nd place, silver medalist(s)		Zebastian Modin; Guide: Albin Ackerot	Sweden
3rd place, bronze medalist(s)		Oleg Ponomarev; Guide: Andrei Romanov	Russia

Men's 1 km sprint (sitting) at the XI Paralympic Winter Games
- Competitors: 24 from 11 nations

Medalists
1st place, gold medalist(s)		Roman Petushkov	Russia
2nd place, silver medalist(s)		Grigory Murygin	Russia
3rd place, bronze medalist(s)		Maksym Yarovyi	Ukraine

Men's 1 km sprint (standing) at the XI Paralympic Winter Games
- Competitors: 35 from 16 nations

Medalists
1st place, gold medalist(s)		Kirill Mikhaylov	Russia
2nd place, silver medalist(s)		Rushan Minnegulov	Russia
3rd place, bronze medalist(s)		Vladislav Lekomtcev	Russia

The men's 1 kilometre sprint classic competition of the 2014 Winter Paralympics was held at Laura Biathlon & Ski Complex near Krasnaya Polyana, Sochi. The competition took place on 12 March 2014

== Medal table ==
* Host nation (Russia)

Rank	Nation	Gold	Silver	Bronze	Total
1	Russia (RUS)*	2	2	2	6
2	Canada (CAN)	1	0	0	1
3	Sweden (SWE)	0	1	0	1
4	Ukraine (UKR)	0	0	1	1
Totals (4 entries)		3	3	3	9

== Visually impaired ==
In the cross-country skiing 1 km Sprint visually impaired, the athlete with a visual impairment has a sighted guide. The two skiers are considered a team, and dual medals are awarded.

=== Qualification ===
Rank	Bib	Name	Country	Time	Difference	Notes
1	102	Brian McKeever; Guide: Graham Nishikawa	Canada	3:32.51	-	Q
2	106	Oleg Ponomarev; Guide: Andrei Romanov	Russia	3:32.93	+0.42	Q
3	104	Zebastian Modin; Guide: Albin Ackerot	Sweden	3:37.04	+4.53	Q
4	101	Stanislav Chokhlaev; Guide: Maksim Pirogov	Russia	+3:40.29	+7.78	Q
5	109	Vladimir Udaltcov; Guide: Ruslan Bogachev	Russia	+3:42.40	+9.89	Q
6	110	Dmytro Shulga; Guide: Artur Gergardt	Ukraine	3:46.18	+13.67	Q
7	108	Alexsander Artemov; Guide: Ilya Cherepanov	Russia	3:46.18	+13.92	Q
8	112	Jacob Adicoff; Guide: Reid Pletcher	United States	3:49.96	+17.45	Q
9	103	Nikolay Polukhin; Guide: Andrey Tokarev	Russia	3:50.92	+18.41	
10	105	Thomas Clarion; Guide: Julien Bourla	France	3:56.87	+24.36	
11	111	Erik Bye; Guide: Kristian Myhre Hellerud	Norway	3:59.27	+26.76	
12	107	Vasili Shaptsiaboi; Guide: Mikhail Lebedzeu	Belarus	4:12.06	+39.55	
13	115	Kairat Kanafin; Guide: Dmitriy Kolomeyets	Kazakhstan	4:30.84	+58.33	
14	113	Kevin Burton; Guide: David Chamberlain	United States	4:39.73	+1:07.22	
15	114	Rudolf Klemetti; Guide: Timo Salminen	Finland	4:48.47	+1:15.96	
16	118	Svetoslav Georgiev; Guide: Ivan Birnikov	Bulgaria	4:58.77	+1:26.26	
17	116	Choi Bogue; Guide: Seo Jeongryun	South Korea	5:17.21	+1:44.70	
18	117	Zhelyaz Kolev; Guide: Iskren plankov	Bulgaria	7:48.46	+4:15.95	

=== Finals ===
==== Semifinal 1 ====
Rank	Bib	Name	Country	Time	Difference	Notes
1	1	Brian McKeever; Guide: Graham Nishikawa	Canada	4:09.5	-	Q
2	5	Vladimir Udaltcov; Guide: Ruslan Bogachev	Russia	4:10.7	+1.2	Q
3	4	Stanislav Chokhlaev; Guide: Maksim Pirogov	Russia	4:11.0	+1.5	
4	8	Jacob Adicoff; Guide: Reid Pletcher	United States	4:29.4	+19.9	

==== Semifinal 2 ====
Rank	Bib	Name	Country	Time	Difference	Notes
1	3	Zebastian Modin; Guide: Albin Ackerot	Sweden	4:11.6	-	Q
2	2	Oleg Ponomarev; Guide: Andrei Romanov	Russia	4:16.6	+5.0	Q
3	6	Dmytro Shulga; Guide: Artur Gergardt	Ukraine	4:21.0	+9.4	
4	7	Alexsander Artemov; Guide: Ilya Cherepanov	Russia	4:21.8	+10.2	

==== Final ====
Rank	Bib	Name	Country	Time	Difference
1st place, gold medalist(s)	1	Brian McKeever; Guide: Graham Nishikawa	Canada	3:59.6	-
2nd place, silver medalist(s)	3	Zebastian Modin; Guide: Albin Ackerot	Sweden	4:01.4	+1.8
3rd place, bronze medalist(s)	2	Oleg Ponomarev; Guide: Andrei Romanov	Russia	4:05.0	+5.4
4	5	Vladimir Udaltcov; Guide: Ruslan Bogachev	Russia	4:23.0	+23.4

== Sitting ==
=== Qualification ===
Rank	Bib	Name	Country	Time	Difference	Notes
1	24	Roman Petushkov	Russia	2:05.78	-	Q
2	23	Maksym Yarovyi	Ukraine	2:07.59	+1:81	Q
3	21	Grigory Murygin	Russia	2:08.67	+2.89	Q
4	22	Irek Zaripov	Russia	2:11.66	+5.88	Q
5	18	Chris Klebl	Canada	2:15.63	+9.85	Q
6	11	Mykhaylo Tkachenko	Ukraine	2:15.92	+10.14	Q
7	15	Yauheni Lukyanenka	Belarus	2:16.28	+10.50	Q
8	9	Ivan Goncharov	Russia	2:17.64	+11.86	Q
9	20	Daniel Cnossen	United States	2:18.01	+12.23	Q
10	13	Martin Fleig	Germany	2:18.75	+12.97	Q
11	16	Andrew Soule	United States	2:19.31	+13.53	Q
12	19	Trygve Steinar Larsen	Norway	2:20.12	+14.34	Q
13	12	Dzmitry Loban	Belarus	2:20.60	+14.82	
14	7	Aaron Pike	United States	2:20.86	+15.08	
15	10	Jeremy Wagner	United States	2:22.35	+16.57	
16	8	Kamil Rosiek	Poland	2:23.90	+18.12	
17	17	Sean Halsted	United States	2:25.57	+19.79	
18	6	Oleksandr Korniiko	Ukraine	2:25.99	+20.21	
19	5	Travis Dodson	United States	2:27.55	+21.77	
20	3	Fernando Aranha	Brazil	2:29.17	+23.39	
21	4	Vladmir Gajdiciar	Slovakia	2:33.42	+27.64	
22	14	Romain Rosique	France	2:33.46	+27.68	
23	1	Sebastien Fortier	Canada	2:43.78	+38.00	
24	2	Yves Bourque	Canada	2:50.67	+44.89	

=== Finals ===
==== Semifinal 1 ====
Rank	Bib	Name	Country	Time	Difference	Notes
1	1	Roman Petushkov	Russia	2:19.7	-	Q
2	4	Irek Zaripov	Russia	2:20.2	+0.5	Q
3	9	Daniel Cnossen	United States	2:23.4	+3.7	Q
4	12	Trygve Steinar Larsen	Norway	2:27.5	+7.8	
5	5	Chris Klebl	Canada	2:29.9	+10.2	
6	8	Ivan Goncharov	Russia	2:33.5	+13.8	

==== Semifinal 2 ====
Rank	Bib	Name	Country	Time	Difference	Notes
1	3	Grigory Murygin	Russia	2:26.7	-	Q
2	2	Maksym Yarovyi	Ukraine	2:27.5	+0.8	Q
3	11	Andrew Soule	United States	2:34.0	+7.3	Q
4	7	Yauheni Lukyanenka	Belarus	2:35.5	+8.8	
5	6	Mykhaylo Tkachenko	Ukraine	2:37.3	+10.6	
6	10	Martin Fleig	Germany	2:38.9	+12.2	

==== Final ====
Rank	Bib	Name	Country	Time	Difference
1st place, gold medalist(s)	1	Roman Petushkov	Russia	2:29.4	-
2nd place, silver medalist(s)	3	Grigory Murygin	Russia	2:30.6	+1.2
3rd place, bronze medalist(s)	2	Maksym Yarovyi	Ukraine	2:31.6	+2.2
4	4	Irek Zaripov	Russia	2:32.3	+2.9
5	11	Andrew Soule	United States	2:38.0	+8.6
6	9	Daniel Cnossen	United States	2:39.9	+10.5

== Standing ==
=== Qualification ===
Rank	Bib	Name	Country	Time	Difference	Notes
1	59	Sergey Lapkin	Russia	3:35.40	-	Q
2	67	Aleksandr Pronkov	Russia	3:37.91	+2.51	Q
3	52	Vladislav Lekomtcev	Russia	3:39.25	+3.85	Q
4	51	Rushan Minnegulov	Russia	3:40.05	+4.65	Q
5	54	Kirill Mikhaylov	Russia	3:43.99	+8.59	Q
6	58	Benjamin Davet	France	3:44.55	+9.15	Q
7	53	Vladimir Kononov	Russia	3:45.10	+9.70	Q
8	61	Azat Karachurin	Russia	3:45.84	+10.44	Q
9	62	Grygorii Vovchynskyi	Ukraine	3:45.91	+10.51	Q
10	57	Ilkka Tuomisto	Finland	3:46.99	+11.59	Q
11	55	Ihor Reptyukh	Ukraine	3:52.01	+16.61	Q
12	56	Yoshihiro Nitta	Japan	3:55.24	+19.84	Q
13	63	Ivan Kodlozerov	Russia	3:55.56	+20.16	
14	66	Vladyslav Maystrenko	Ukraine	3:59.45	+24.05	
15	60	Hakon Olsrud	Norway	3:59.83	+24.43	
16	69	Siarhei Silchanka	Belarus	4:07.92	+32.52	
17	80	Du Haitao	China	4:09.25	+33.85	
18	71	Witold Skupien	Poland	4:10.33	+34.93	
19	70	Lasse Kankkunen	Finland	4:11.98	+36.58	
20	68	Pablo Javier Robledo	Argentina	4:12.79	+37.39	
21	73	Zou Dexin	China	4:15.01	+39.61	
22	64	Keiichi Sato	Japan	4:18.00	+42.60	
23	72	Siarhei Vauchunovich	Belarus	4:18.37	+42.97	
24	65	Tino Uhlig	Germany	4:20.19	+44.79	
25	77	Ganbold Matmunkh	Mongolia	4:26.65	+51.25	
26	74	Cheng Shishuai	China	4:26.77	+51.37	
27	84	Michael Kurz	Austria	4:28.34	+52.94	
28	78	Tian Ye	China	4:36.00	+1:00.60	
29	79	Louis Fortin	Canada	4:46.45	+1:11.05	
30	76	Omar Bermejo	United States	4:48.86	+1:13.46	
31	81	John Oman	United States	4:57.99	+1:22.59	
32	82	Keigo Iwamoto	Japan	4:58.94	+1:23.54	
33	75	Alexandr Kolyadin	Kazakhstan	4:59.04	+1:23.64	
34	83	Liu Jianhui	China	5:03.23	+1:27.83	
35	85	Yerlan Omarov	Kazakhstan	5:07.54	+1:32.14	

=== Finals ===
==== Semifinal 1 ====
Rank	Bib	Name	Country	Time	Difference	Notes
1	1	Sergey Lapkin	Russia	4:08.1	-	Q
2	4	Rushan Minnegulov	Russia	4:08.3	+0.2	Q
3	5	Kirill Mikhaylov	Russia	4:09.3	+1.2	Q
4	9	Grygorii Vovchynskyi	Ukraine	4:12.7	+4.6	
5	8	Azat Karachurin	Russia	4:16.6	+8.5	
6	12	Yoshihiro Nitta	Japan	4:21.2	+13.1	

==== Semifinal 2 ====
Rank	Bib	Name	Country	Time	Difference	Notes
1	3	Vladislav Lekomtcev	Russia	4:05.4	-	Q
2	7	Vladimir Kononov	Russia	4:06.6	+1.2	Q
3	2	Aleksandr Pronkov	Russia	4:10.2	+4.8	Q
4	6	Benjamin Davet	France	4:10.3	+4.9	
5	10	Ilkka Tuomisto	Finland	4:12.2	+6.8	
6	11	Ihor Reptyukh	Ukraine	4:20.2	+14.8	

==== Final ====
Rank	Bib	Name	Country	Time	Difference
1st place, gold medalist(s)	5	Kirill Mikhaylov	Russia	3:53.5	-
2nd place, silver medalist(s)	4	Rushan Minnegulov	Russia	3:53.8	+0.3
3rd place, bronze medalist(s)	3	Vladislav Lekomtcev	Russia	3:54.6	+1.1
4	2	Aleksandr Pronkov	Russia	4:03.7	+10.2
5	1	Sergey Lapkin	Russia	4:14.9	+21.4
RAL	7	Vladimir Kononov	Russia		

== See also ==
- Cross-country skiing at the 2014 Winter Olympics
