= Cross-country skiing at the 2014 Winter Paralympics – Men's 20 km Free =

Men's 20km Classic at the XI Paralympic Winter Games
- Paralympic cross-country skiing
- Venue: Laura Biathlon & Ski Complex, Krasnaya Polyana, Russia
- Dates: 9 & 10 March

Men's 20 km (standing) at the XI Paralympic Winter Games
- Competitors: 20 from 12 nations

Medalists
1st place, gold medalist(s)		Rushan Minnegulov	Russia
2nd place, silver medalist(s)		Ilkka Tuomisto	Finland
3rd place, bronze medalist(s)		Vladislav Lekomtcev	Russia

Men's 15 km (sitting) at the XI Paralympic Winter Games
- Competitors: 21 from 9 nations

Medalists
1st place, gold medalist(s)		Roman Petushkov	Russia
2nd place, silver medalist(s)		Irek Zaripov	Russia
3rd place, bronze medalist(s)		Aleksandr Davidovich	Russia

Men's 20 km (visually impaired) at the XI Paralympic Winter Games
- Competitors: 13 from 8 nations

Medalists
1st place, gold medalist(s)		Brian McKeever; Guide: Erik Carleton	Canada
2nd place, silver medalist(s)		Stanislav Chokhlaev; Guide: Maksim Pirogov	Russia
3rd place, bronze medalist(s)		Zebastian Modin; Guide: Albin Ackerot	Sweden

The men's 20 kilometres competition of the 2014 Winter Paralympics was held at Laura Biathlon & Ski Complex near Krasnaya Polyana, Sochi. The sitting 15 km competition took place on 9 March 2014 and the standing and visually impaired competition took place on 10 March 2014.

== Medal table ==
* Host nation (Russia)

Rank	Nation	Gold	Silver	Bronze	Total
1	Russia (RUS)*	2	2	2	6
2	Canada (CAN)	1	0	0	1
3	Finland (FIN)	0	1	0	1
4	Sweden (SWE)	0	0	1	1
Totals (4 entries)		3	3	3	9

== Standing ==
Rank	Bib	Name	Country	Real Time	Result	Difference
1st place, gold medalist(s)	20	Rushan Minnegulov	Russia	55:57.3	50:55.1	-
2nd place, silver medalist(s)	14	Ilkka Tuomisto	Finland	56:37.2	51:31.5	+36.4
3rd place, bronze medalist(s)	19	Vladislav Lekomtcev	Russia	57:29.5	51:44.6	+49.5
4	15	Yoshihiro Nitta	Japan	59:31.7	54:10.2	+3:15.1
5	13	Tino Uhlig	Germany	1:01:00.2	55:30.8	+4:35.7
6	16	Ihor Reptyukh	Ukraine	1:01:38.4	56:05.5	+5:10.4
7	17	Kirill Mikhaylov	Russia	58:52.9	56:31.6	+5:36.5
8	18	Vladimir Kononov	Russia	1:10:25.2	57:02.4	+6:07.3
9	12	Vitalii Sytnyk	Ukraine	1:05:01.7	58:31.5	+7:36.4
10	1	Michael Kurz	Austria	1:07:13.0	1:00:29.7	+9:34.6
11	10	Siarhei Vauchunovich	Belarus	1:07:36.2	1:00:50.6	+9:55.5
12	11	Pablo Javier Robledo	Argentina	1:05:24.2	1:02:47.2	+11:52.1
13	7	Alexandr Kolyadin	Kazakhstan	1:06:40.3	1:04:00.3	+13:05.2
14	6	Ganbold Matmunkh	Mongolia	1:11:08.3	1:04:01.5	+13:06.4
15	9	Zou Dexin	China	1:14:49.7	1:07:20.7	+16:25.6
16	2	Liu Jianhui	China	1:16:32.4	1:09:39.1	+18:44.0
17	5	Tian Ye	China	1:17:35.5	1:10:36.5	+19:41.4
18	3	John Oman	United States	1:24:41.4	1:17:04.1	+26:09.0
	4	Du Haitao	China	DNF		
	8	Cheng Shishuai	China	DNF		

== Sitting (15km) ==
Rank	Bib	Name	Country	Real Time	Result	Difference
1st place, gold medalist(s)	21	Roman Petushkov	Russia	40:51.6	40:51.6	-
2nd place, silver medalist(s)	19	Irek Zaripov	Russia	41:55.1	41:55.1	+1:03.5
3rd place, bronze medalist(s)	17	Aleksandr Davidovich	Russia	42:08.6	42:08.6	+1:17.0
4	20	Maksym Yarovyi	Ukraine	49:00.5	42:08.8	+1:17.2
5	12	Andrew Soule	United States	42:53.8	42:53.8	+2:02.2
6	14	Chris Klebl	Canada	45:52.0	43:06.9	+2:15.3
7	15	Enzo Masiello	Italy	46:48.0	43:59.5	+3:07.9
8	11	Yauheni Lukyanenka	Belarus	44:19.1	44:19.1	+3:27.5
9	13	Sean Halsted	United States	46:21.3	44:57.9	+4:06.3
10	10	Mykhaylo Tkachenko	Ukraine	44:58.8	44:58.8	+4:07.2
11	9	Kamil Rosiek	Poland	45:13.1	45:13.1	+4:21.5
12	8	Aaron Pike	United States	46:44.7	45:20.6	+4:29.0
13	18	Daniel Cnossen	United States	45:22.4	45:22.4	+4:30.8
14	16	Kozo Kubo	Japan	48:59.4	46:03.0	+5:11.4
15	6	Fernando Rocha	Brazil	51:03.3	49:31.4	+8:39.8
16	5	Roland Ruepp	Italy	51:45.2	50:12.0	+9:20.4
17	7	Augusto Jose Perez	United States	51:24.2	51:24.2	+10:32.6
18	2	Sebastien Fortier	Canada	53:19.3	51:43.3	+10:51.7
19	1	Brian Price	United States	53:56.6	52:19.5	+11:27.9
20	4	Yves Bourque	Canada	55:25.4	55:25.4	+14:33.8
21	3	Giordano Tomasoni	Italy	58:36.3	56:50.8	+15:59.2

== Visually impaired ==
Rank	Bib	Name	Country	Real Time	Result	Difference
1st place, gold medalist(s)	62	Brian McKeever; Guide: Erik Carleton	Canada	52:37.1	52:37.1	-
2nd place, silver medalist(s)	63	Stanislav Chokhlaev; Guide: Maksim Pirogov	Russia	1:01:44.9	53:43.3	+1:06.2
3rd place, bronze medalist(s)	61	Zebastian Modin; Guide: Albin Ackerot	Sweden	1:05:02.2	56:34.9	+3:57.8
4	58	Alexsander Artemov; Guide: Ilya Cherepanov	Russia	1:06:35.1	57:55.7	+5:18.6
5	56	Vladimir Udaltcov; Guide: Ruslan Bogachev	Russia	58:22.9	58:22.9	+5:45.8
6	53	Jacob Adicoff; Guide: Reid Pletcher	United States	58:37.4	58:37.4	+6:00.3
7	57	Iurii Utkin; Guide: Vitaliy Kazakov	Ukraine	59:06.1	59:06.1	+6:29.0
8	54	Erik Bye; Guide: Kristian Myhre Hellerud	Norway	59:21.5	59:21.5	+6:44.4
9	55	Iaroslav Reshetynskiy; Guide: Dmytro Khurtyk	Ukraine	59:27.6	59:27.6	+6:50.5
10	52	Kevin Burton; Guide: David Chamberlain	United States	1:08:41.0	1:07:18.6	+14:41.5
11	51	Rudolf Klemetti; Guide: Timo Salminen	Finland	1:11:58.9	1:10:32.5	+17:55.4
	59	Vasili Shaptsiaboi; Guide: Mikhail Lebedzeu	Belarus	DNF		
	60	Oleg Ponomarev; Guide: Andrei Romanov	Russia	DNS		

== See also ==
- Cross-country skiing at the 2014 Winter Olympics
