= 2021 World Para Ice Hockey Championships =

Tournament details
- Host country: Czech Republic
- Venue(s): Ostravar Aréna, Ostrava
- Dates: 19−26 June
- Teams: 8

Final positions
- Champions: United States (5th title)
- Runners-up: Canada
- Third place: RPC
- Fourth place: South Korea

Tournament statistics
- Games played: 20
- Goals scored: 128 (6.4 per game)
- Attendance: 11,354 (568 per game)
- Scoring leader: (Russia) Nikolay Terentyev (17 points)

Awards
- MVP: (United States) Brody Roybal

Official website
- www.paralympic.org/ostrava-2021

The 2021 World Para Ice Hockey Championships was the 11th edition of the World Para Ice Hockey Championships (originally named IPC Ice Sledge Hockey World Championships) held in 2021.

The main event (Tournament A) was hosted by Ostrava, Czech Republic from 19 to 26 June 2021. It was the third time Ostrava hosted the Championships, previously hosting in 2019 and 2009.

== Format ==
In Tournament A the contestants are divided into two groups based on their ranking. The top two teams from Group A advanced directly into semi-finals while the remaining two teams together with the best two teams from Group B advanced to quarter-finals.

== Tournament A ==
=== Venue ===
Ostrava	Ostrava is located in Czech Republic
Ostravar Aréna Capacity: 10,004	Ostrava is located in Czech Republic

=== Preliminary round ===
All times are local (UTC+2).

==== Group A ====
Pos	Team	Pld	W	OTW	OTL	L	GF	GA	GD	Pts	Qualification
1	Canada	3	3	0	0	0	20	1	+19	9	Semifinals
2	United States	3	2	0	0	1	13	2	+11	6	Semifinals
3	South Korea	3	1	0	0	2	2	16	−14	3	Quarterfinals
4	Czech Republic (H)	3	0	0	0	3	0	16	−16	0	Quarterfinals

Source: IPC
(H) Host

19 June 2021; 12:00	South Korea	2–0 (1–0, 1–0, 0–0)	Czech Republic	Ostravar Aréna, Ostrava; Attendance: 1,858

Game reference
8 min	Penalties	16 min
10	Shots	18

19 June 2021; 15:00	United States	1–2 (0–0, 0–2, 1–0)	Canada	Ostravar Aréna, Ostrava; Attendance: 489

Game reference
6 min	Penalties	4 min
16	Shots	9

20 June 2021; 11:15	Canada	8–0 (3–0, 3–0, 2–0)	South Korea	Ostravar Aréna, Ostrava; Attendance: 187

Game reference
4 min	Penalties	10 min
28	Shots	3

20 June 2021; 14:30	Czech Republic	0–4 (0–0, 0–2, 0–2)	United States	Ostravar Aréna, Ostrava; Attendance: 2,077

Game reference
8 min	Penalties	4 min
0	Shots	51

22 June 2021; 14:15	Canada	10–0 (4–0, 5–0, 1–0)	Czech Republic	Ostravar Aréna, Ostrava; Attendance: 1,675

Game reference
6 min	Penalties	4 min
27	Shots	4

22 June 2021; 20:45	United States	8–0 (3–0, 4–0, 1–0)	South Korea	Ostravar Aréna, Ostrava; Attendance: 157

Game reference
4 min	Penalties	12 min
32	Shots	2

==== Group B ====
Pos	Team	Pld	W	OTW	OTL	L	GF	GA	GD	Pts	Qualification
1	RPC	3	3	0	0	0	34	1	+33	9	Quarterfinals
2	Norway	3	1	1	0	1	8	23	−15	5	Quarterfinals
3	Slovakia	3	1	0	0	2	5	11	−6	3	Seventh place game
4	Italy	3	0	0	1	2	4	16	−12	1	Seventh place game

Source: IPC

19 June 2021; 18:10	Norway	4–3 GWS (2–0, 0–0, 1–3) (OT: 0–0) (SO: 1–0)	Italy	Ostravar Aréna, Ostrava; Attendance: 389

Game reference
0 min	Penalties	6 min
13	Shots	15

19 June 2021; 21:15	RPC	7–0 (3–0, 3–0, 1–0)	Slovakia	Ostravar Aréna, Ostrava; Attendance: 196

Game reference

Andrei Kasatkin
Evgenii Plotnikov
Goalies
Eduard Lepáček
Referee:
(Norway) Owe Luthcke
Linesmen:
(Norway) Marius Hermansen Oswold
(Sweden) Andeas Lundén

Petrov (PP) – 01:56	1–0
Terentyev (Shikhov, Sokolov) – 08:14	2–0
Khamzin (Terentyev, Volkov) – 13:14	3–0
Khamzin (Petrov, Galkin) (PP) – 18:36	4–0
Kuznetsov (Lisov) – 26:21	5–0
Petrov (Khamzin, Lisov) (PP) – 29:19	6–0
Popov (Rychkov) – 39:59	7–0

0 min
Penalties
8 min
37
Shots
0

20 June 2021; 17:30	Italy	0–9 (0–5, 0–1, 0–3)	RPC	Ostravar Aréna, Ostrava; Attendance: 164

Game reference

Julian Kasslatter
Gabriele Araudo
Goalies
Andrei Kasatkin
Evgenii Plotnikov
Referee:
(Czech Republic) Martin Rapák
Linesmen:
(Norway) Marius Hermansen Oswold
(Sweden) Andeas Lundén

0–1	02:22 – Miachin (Shikhov)
0–2	03:13 – Lisov (Petrov, Galkin)
0–3	09:12 – Terentyev (Volkov) (PP)
0–4	09:42 – Khamzin (Petrov, Galkin)
0–5	13:27 – Rychkov (Galkin)
0–6	28:22 – Petrov (Khamzin, Galkin)
0–7	32:25 – Terentyev (Shikhov, Sokolov)
0–8	32:55 – Petrov (Lisov, Khamzin)
0–9	34:26 – Terentyev (Shikhov, Sokolov)

8 min
Penalties
8 min
6
Shots
31

20 June 2021; 21:00	Slovakia	2–3 (1–2, 1–0, 0–1)	Norway	Ostravar Aréna, Ostrava; Attendance: 158

Game reference
6 min	Penalties	4 min
8	Shots	17

22 June 2021; 10:30	Norway	1–18 (1–8, 0–0, 0–10)	RPC	Ostravar Aréna, Ostrava; Attendance: 387

Game reference

Emanuel Lunde
Goalies
Andrei Kasatkin
Evgenii Plotnikov
Referee:
(Denmark) Jacob Grumsen
Linesmen:
(Serbia) Tibor Fazekaš
(Sweden) Tony Rundström

	0–1	01:06 – Shikhov (Terentyev, Sokolov)
	0–2	02:30 – Shikhov (Miachin, Terentyev) (PP)
	0–3	03:05 – Lisov (Petrov)
	0–4	05:34 – Galkin (Lisov)
	0–5	09:10 – Khamzin (Kuznetsov)
	0–6	09:57 – Terentyev (Volkov, Shikhov)
Nordstoga – 10:29	1–6
	1–7	11:16 – Miachin (Rychkov)
	1–8	12:16 – Lisov
	1–9	31:42 – Shikhov (Sokolov, Terentyev)
	1–10	32:27 – Rychkov
	1–11	33:06 – Rychkov (Barykin, Popov)
	1–12	34:18 – Petrov (Galkin)
	1–13	34:57 – Terentyev
	1–14	36:56 – Petrov (Lisov)
	1–15	37:45 – Miachin (Shikhov, Sokolov)
	1–16	38:15 – Rychkov (Popov)
	1–17	40:07 – Petrov (Shikhov)
	1–18	41:49 – Terentyev (Popov, Sokolov)

8 min
Penalties
0 min
2
Shots
38

22 June 2021; 17:30	Italy	1–3 (0–0, 0–1, 1–2)	Slovakia	Ostravar Aréna, Ostrava; Attendance: 134

Game reference
2 min	Penalties	8 min
21	Shots	16

=== Playoff round ===
==== Bracket ====
Quarterfinals
23 June
RPC	7
Czech Republic	0
23 June
Norway	1
South Korea (OT)	2

Semifinals
25 June
RPC	1
Canada	2
25 June
United States	9
South Korea	0

Final
27 June
Canada	1
United States	5
Third place
26 June
RPC	7
South Korea	0

==== Quarterfinals ====
23 June 2021; 14:15	RPC	7–0 (4–0, 2–0, 1–0)	Czech Republic	Ostravar Aréna, Ostrava; Attendance: 879

Game reference

Andrei Kasatkin
Goalies
Martin Kudela
Referee:
(Austria) Kristijan Nikolic
Linesmen:
(Serbia) Ivan Nedeljković
(Sweden) Tony Rundström

Shikhov (Terentyev) (PP) – 06:03	1–0
Sokolov (Shikhov, Terentyev) – 07:34	2–0
Terentyev (Shikhov) (SH) – 09:40	3–0
Lisov (Khamzin) – 10:42	4–0
Galkin (Petrov) (PP) – 26:50	5–0
Khamzin (Lisov, Petrov) – 29:45	6–0
Shikhov – 44:38	7–0

6 min
Penalties
10 min
24
Shots
5

23 June 2021; 17:30	Norway	1–2 OT (0–1, 0–0, 1–0) (OT: 0–1)	South Korea	Ostravar Aréna, Ostrava; Attendance: 139

Game reference
4 min	Penalties	6 min
9	Shots	12

==== Semifinals ====
25 June 2021; 13:45	United States	9–0 (3–0, 2–0, 4–0)	South Korea	Ostravar Aréna, Ostrava; Attendance: 120

Game reference
4 min	Penalties	2 min
47	Shots	1

25 June 2021; 17:00	RPC	1–2 (0–1, 1–1, 0–0)	Canada	Ostravar Aréna, Ostrava; Attendance: 293

Game reference

Andrei Kasatkin
Goalies
Dominic Larocque
Referee:
(Denmark) Jacob Grumsen
Linesmen:
(Norway) Marius Hermansen Oswold
(Czech Republic) Jan Vaněk

	0–1	02:49 – Hickey (SH)
	0–2	19:45 – McGregor (Bridges, Hickey) (PP)
Miachin (Terentyev, Volkov) (PP) – 24:43	1–2

10 min
Penalties
12 min
7
Shots
13

==== Seventh place game ====
23 June 2021; 20:45	Slovakia	0–4 (0–3, 0–1, 0–0)	Italy	Ostravar Aréna, Ostrava; Attendance: 92

Game reference
8 min	Penalties	8 min
12	Shots	15

==== Fifth place game ====
25 June 2021; 20:30	Norway	1–2 (0–0, 1–2, 0–0)	Czech Republic	Ostravar Aréna, Ostrava; Attendance: 1,234

Game reference
4 min	Penalties	2 min
9	Shots	16

==== Bronze medal game ====
26 June 2021; 17:45	RPC	7–0 (2–0, 3–0, 2–0)	South Korea	Ostravar Aréna, Ostrava; Attendance: 158

Game reference

Andrei Kasatkin
Goalies
Yu Man-gyun
Choi Hyuk-jun
Referee:
(United States) Bobby Esposito
Linesmen:
(Norway) Marius Hermansen Oswold
(Czech Republic) Jan Vaněk

Lisov – 05:40	1–0
Lisov (Galkin) – 08:15	2–0
Lisov (Petrov, Khamzin) – 17:14	3–0
Rychkov (Maletskiy) – 26:51	4–0
Sokolov (Kuznetsov, Terentyev) – 29:58	5–0
Lisov (Petrov) (SH) – 41:01	6–0
Terentyev (Sokolov) – 43:21	7–0

6 min
Penalties
2 min
25
Shots
11

==== Final ====
26 June 2021; 21:00	Canada	1–5 (1–2, 0–2, 0–1)	United States	Ostravar Aréna, Ostrava; Attendance: 568

Game reference

Dominic Larocque
Goalies
Steve Cash
Referee:
(Austria) Kristijan Nikolic
Linesmen:
(Sweden) Andreas Lundén
(Sweden) Tony Rundström

	0–1	07:28 – Farmer (Wallace, Pauls) (PP)
	0–2	10:33 – Dodson (Eustace, Roybal)
Bridges (Westlake, McGregor) (PP) – 13:54	1–2
	1–3	19:20 – Pauls (Wallace, Farmer) (PP2)
	1–4	28:56 – Farmer (Wallace)
	1–5	38:27 – Eustace (Dodson, Roybal)

8 min
Penalties
6 min
1
Shots
39

=== Final standings ===
Pos	Grp	Team	Pld	W	OTW	OTL	L	GF	GA	GD	Pts	Final result
1	A	United States	5	4	0	0	1	27	3	+24	12	Champions
2	A	Canada	5	4	0	0	1	23	7	+16	12	Runners-up
3	B	RPC	6	5	0	0	1	49	3	+46	15	Third place
4	A	South Korea	6	1	1	0	4	4	33	−29	5	Fourth place
5	A	Czech Republic (H)	5	1	0	0	4	2	24	−22	3	Fifth place game
6	B	Norway	5	1	1	1	2	10	27	−17	6	Fifth place game
7	B	Italy	4	1	0	1	2	8	16	−8	4	Relegated to Tournament B
8	B	Slovakia	4	1	0	0	3	5	15	−10	3	Relegated to Tournament B

Source: IPC
(H) Host

=== Awards and statistics ===
==== Awards ====
- Best players selected by the Directorate:
  - Best Goaltender: (Canada) Dominic Larocque
  - Best Defenceman: (Canada) Liam Hickey
  - Best Forward: (United States) Brody Roybal

Source: IPC

- MVP: (United States) Brody Roybal

Source: IPC

==== Scoring leaders ====
List shows the top skaters sorted by points, then goals.

Player	GP	G	A	Pts	+/−	PIM	POS
(Russia) Nikolay Terentyev	6	9	8	17	+14	4	F
(Russia) Evgeny Petrov	6	7	8	15	+19	10	F
(Russia) Dmitry Lisov	6	8	6	14	+19	0	F
(Russia) Konstantin Shikhov	6	5	9	14	+14	2	F
(Russia) Airat Khamzin	6	5	7	12	+16	4	F
(Canada) Tyler McGregor	5	8	3	11	+8	2	F
(United States) Brody Roybal	5	7	4	11	+13	0	F
(Russia) Dmitrii Galkin	6	2	9	11	+21	0	D
(Canada) Liam Hickey	5	3	7	10	+12	4	D
(United States) Josh Pauls	5	3	7	10	+15	2	D

GP = Games played; G = Goals; A = Assists; Pts = Points; +/− = Plus/minus; PIM = Penalties in minutes; POS = Position
Source: IPC

==== Leading goaltenders ====
Only the top five goaltenders, based on save percentage, who have played at least 40% of their team's minutes, are included in this list.

Player	TOI	GA	GAA	SA	Sv%	SO
(Russia) Andrei Kasatkin	219:55	3	0.61	34	91.18	2
(Canada) Dominic Larocque	157:56	7	1.99	63	88.89	0
(Czech Republic) Martin Kudela	90:00	11	5.50	75	85.33	0
(Italy) Gabriele Araudo	75:00	4	2.40	27	85.19	1
(Slovakia) Eduard Lepáček	179:07	15	3.77	90	83.33	0

TOI = Time on Ice (minutes:seconds); SA = Shots against; GA = Goals against; GAA = Goals against average; Sv% = Save percentage; SO = Shutouts
Source: IPC

== Tournament B ==
=== Results ===
Pos	Team	Pld	W	OTW	OTL	L	GF	GA	GD	Pts	Qualification or relegation
1	China	5	5	0	0	0	61	2	+59	15	Advanced to Tournament A
2	Germany	5	4	0	0	1	39	12	+27	12	Advanced to Tournament A
3	Sweden (H)	5	2	1	0	2	15	10	+5	8	
4	Japan	5	2	0	1	2	19	24	−5	7	
5	Finland	5	1	0	0	4	3	40	−37	3	
6	Poland	5	0	0	0	5	1	50	−49	0	Relegated to Tournament C

Source: IPC
(H) Host

All times are local (UTC+2).

17 September 2021; 10:00	Poland	0–18 (0–6, 0–6, 0–6)	China	Östersund Arena, Östersund

Game reference
2 min	Penalties	0 min
0	Shots	56

17 September 2021; 13:30	Germany	7–0 (3–0, 1–0, 3–0)	Japan	Östersund Arena, Östersund

Game reference
6 min	Penalties	10 min
27	Shots	11

17 September 2021; 17:00	Finland	0–6 (0–2, 0–2, 0–2)	Sweden	Östersund Arena, Östersund; Attendance: 150

Game reference
4 min	Penalties	8 min
5	Shots	25

18 September 2021; 10:00	Japan	10–0 (2–0, 1–0, 7–0)	Poland	Östersund Arena, Östersund

Game reference
37 min	Penalties	0 min
41	Shots	4

18 September 2021; 13:30	China	12–0 (9–0, 2–0, 1–0)	Finland	Östersund Arena, Östersund; Attendance: 30

Game reference
8 min	Penalties	4 min
44	Shots	1

18 September 2021; 17:00	Sweden	1–3 (0–0, 1–3, 0–0)	Germany	Östersund Arena, Östersund; Attendance: 100

Game reference
4 min	Penalties	4 min
7	Shots	25

19 September 2021; 10:00	Japan	0–15 (0–7, 0–4, 0–4)	China	Östersund Arena, Östersund

Game reference
14 min	Penalties	6 min
1	Shots	34

19 September 2021; 13:30	Finland	1–13 (0–4, 0–6, 1–3)	Germany	Östersund Arena, Östersund; Attendance: 20

Game reference
2 min	Penalties	4 min
2	Shots	44

19 September 2021; 17:00	Sweden	6–0 (3–0, 2–0, 1–0)	Poland	Östersund Arena, Östersund; Attendance: 20

Game reference
6 min	Penalties	0 min
24	Shots	1

21 September 2021; 10:00	Germany	14–0 (6–0, 3–0, 5–0)	Poland	Östersund Arena, Östersund

Game reference
4 min	Penalties	4 min
43	Shots	1

21 September 2021; 13:30	Japan	8–0 (2–0, 3–0, 3–0)	Finland	Östersund Arena, Östersund; Attendance: 30

Game reference
2 min	Penalties	6 min
34	Shots	0

21 September 2021; 17:00	China	6–0 (1–0, 3–0, 2–0)	Sweden	Östersund Arena, Östersund; Attendance: 90

Game reference
6 min	Penalties	8 min
28	Shots	3

22 September 2021; 10:00	Poland	1–2 (0–1, 0–1, 1–0)	Finland	Östersund Arena, Östersund; Attendance: 20

Game reference
2 min	Penalties	6 min
9	Shots	15

22 September 2021; 13:30	China	10–2 (7–1, 1–0, 2–1)	Germany	Östersund Arena, Östersund; Attendance: 20

Game reference
12 min	Penalties	14 min
28	Shots	11

22 September 2021; 17:00	Sweden	2–1 GWS (0–0, 0–1, 1–0) (OT: 0–0) (SO: 1–0)	Japan	Östersund Arena, Östersund; Attendance: 100

Game reference
2 min	Penalties	10 min
15	Shots	11
