= Östersunds BS =

- City: Östersund, Sweden
- League: Division 1
- Division: Övre Norrland
- Founded: 5 September 1974; 50 years ago
- Home arena: Östersund Arena, Odenvallens IP

Östersunds BS is a bandy club in Östersund, Sweden, established on 5 September 1974 when Ope IF's bandy section was disestablished. The women's bandy team debuted in the Swedish top division during the season of 2013-2014.
