= Valerii Redkozubov =

Russian para-alpine skier

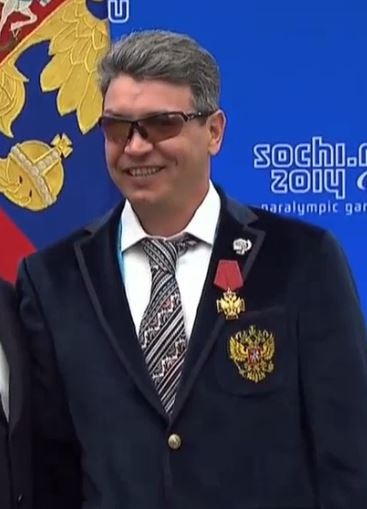

Personal information
- Nationality: Russian
- Born: 20 July 1972 (age 53) Rostov Oblast, Gukovo, Soviet Union
- Years active: 2007 – present
- Height: 1.77 m (5 ft 10 in)
- Weight: 82 kg (181 lb)

Sport
- Country: Russia
- Sport: Paralympic alpine skiing
- Disability class: B2
- Partner: Evgeny Geroev (guide)
Medal record
Men's para alpine skiing
Representing Russia
Winter Paralympics
Gold medal – first place	Sochi 2014	slalom visually impaired
Gold medal – first place	Sochi 2014	combined visually impaired
Bronze medal – third place	Sochi 2014	giant slalom visually impaired
Representing the Neutral Paralympic Athletes
Bronze medal – third place	Pyeongchang 2018	slalom visually impaired
Bronze medal – third place	Pyeongchang 2018	super combined visually impaired

Valerii Redkozubov (also spelled Valery, Russian: Редкозубов, Валерий Анатольевич; born 20 July 1972) is a Russian male visually impaired Paralympic alpine skier. He has represented Russia at the Paralympics on 3 Winter Paralympic events in 2010, 2014 and 2018. He was the flagbearer for Russia during the 2014 Winter Paralympics as he led the Russian Paralympic delegation in its home nation at the opening ceremony of the event. He was awarded the Order "For Merit to the Fatherland" by the Russian President, Vladimir Putin in 2014 for his outstanding performance at the 2014 Winter Paralympics. Valerii Redkozubov was also awarded the Medal of the Order "For Merit to the Fatherland" in March 2018 by Vladimir Putin after his impressive Paralympic record during the 2018 Winter Paralympics.

== Career ==
Valery Redkozubov has claimed 5 medals in his Paralympic career including 2 gold medals since making his debut at the Vancouver Winter Paralympics.

=== 2010 Winter Paralympics ===
Valery made his Paralympic debut for Russia at the 2010 Winter Paralympics and competed in the alpine skiing events. He went medalless during the competition before making a standout performance at the Sochi Winter Paralympics in 2014.

=== 2014 Winter Paralympics ===
Valery Redkozubov competed for Russia at the 2014 Winter Paralympics which was his second consecutive Winter Paralympic appearance and competed in the alpine skiing events. He was the flagbearer for the Russian team at the opening ceremony. He claimed his first Paralympic medal during the 2014 Winter Paralympics as he clinched a gold medal in the men's slalom visually impaired event and repeated his gold medal hunt by claiming a gold medal in the men's combined visually impaired event. Valerii Redkozubov also secured a bronze medal in the men's giant slalom visually impaired event, which was his third medal at the 2014 Winter Paralympics and was also his third Paralympic medal in his Paralympic career.

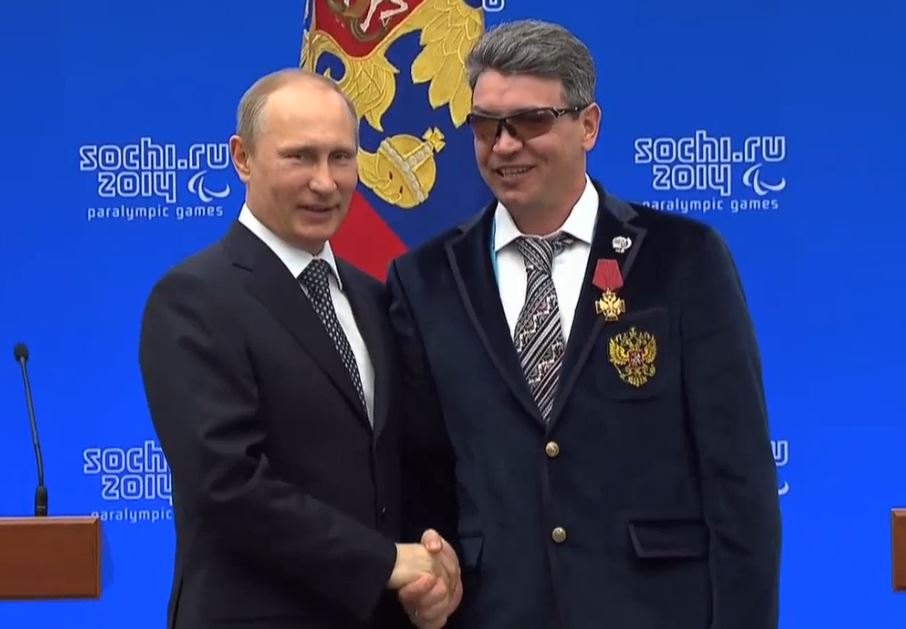
Valerii Redkozubov poses and shake hands with Russian President, Vladimir Putin after medal success

=== 2018 Winter Paralympics ===
Valery Redkozubov competed for Neutral Paralympic Athletes at the 2018 Winter Paralympics after the official ban for Russia from competing from both 2018 Winter Olympics and 2018 Winter Paralympics due to doping scandal. He claimed 2 bronze medals at the alpine skiing events.

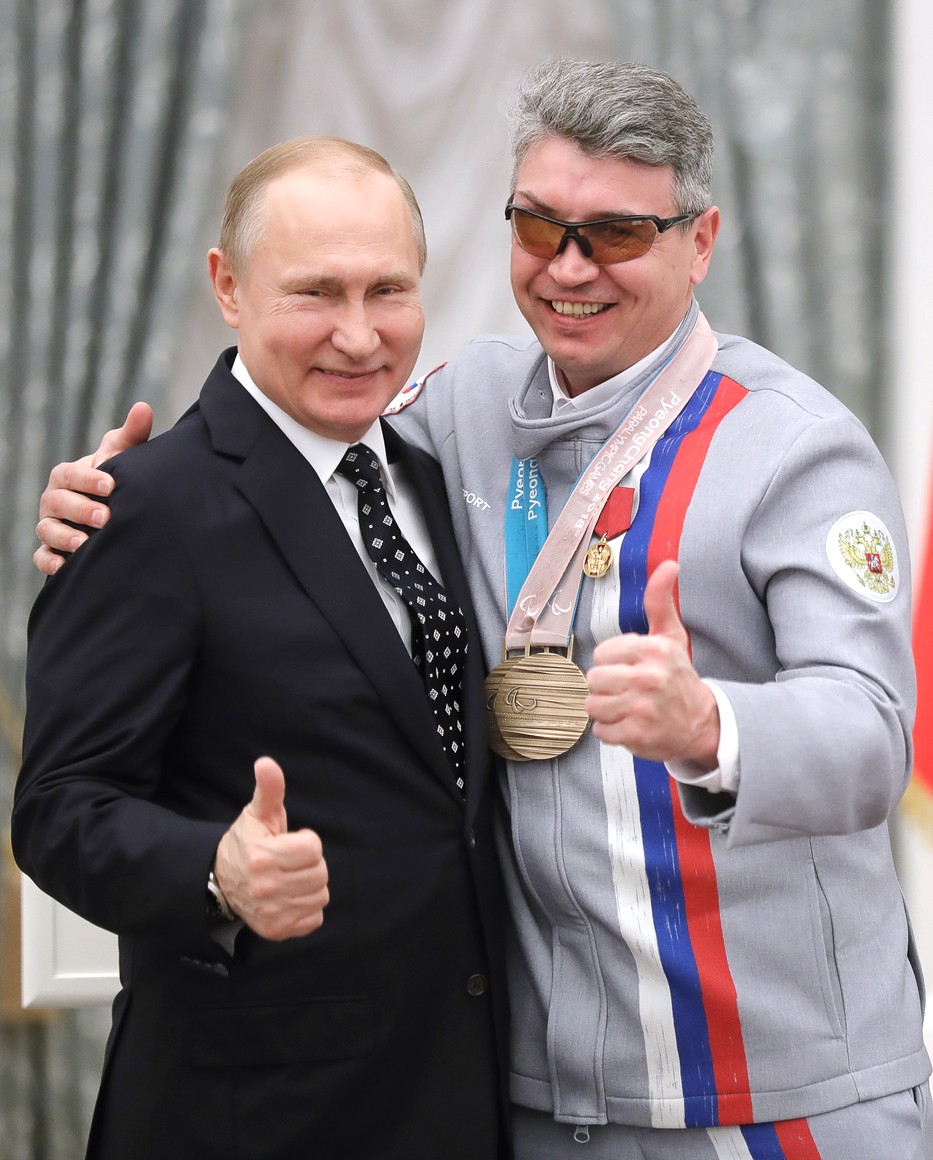
Valerii Redkozubov poses with a bronze medal along with Russian President, Vladimir Putin
