= Östersund Arena =

Sports venue in Östersund, Sweden

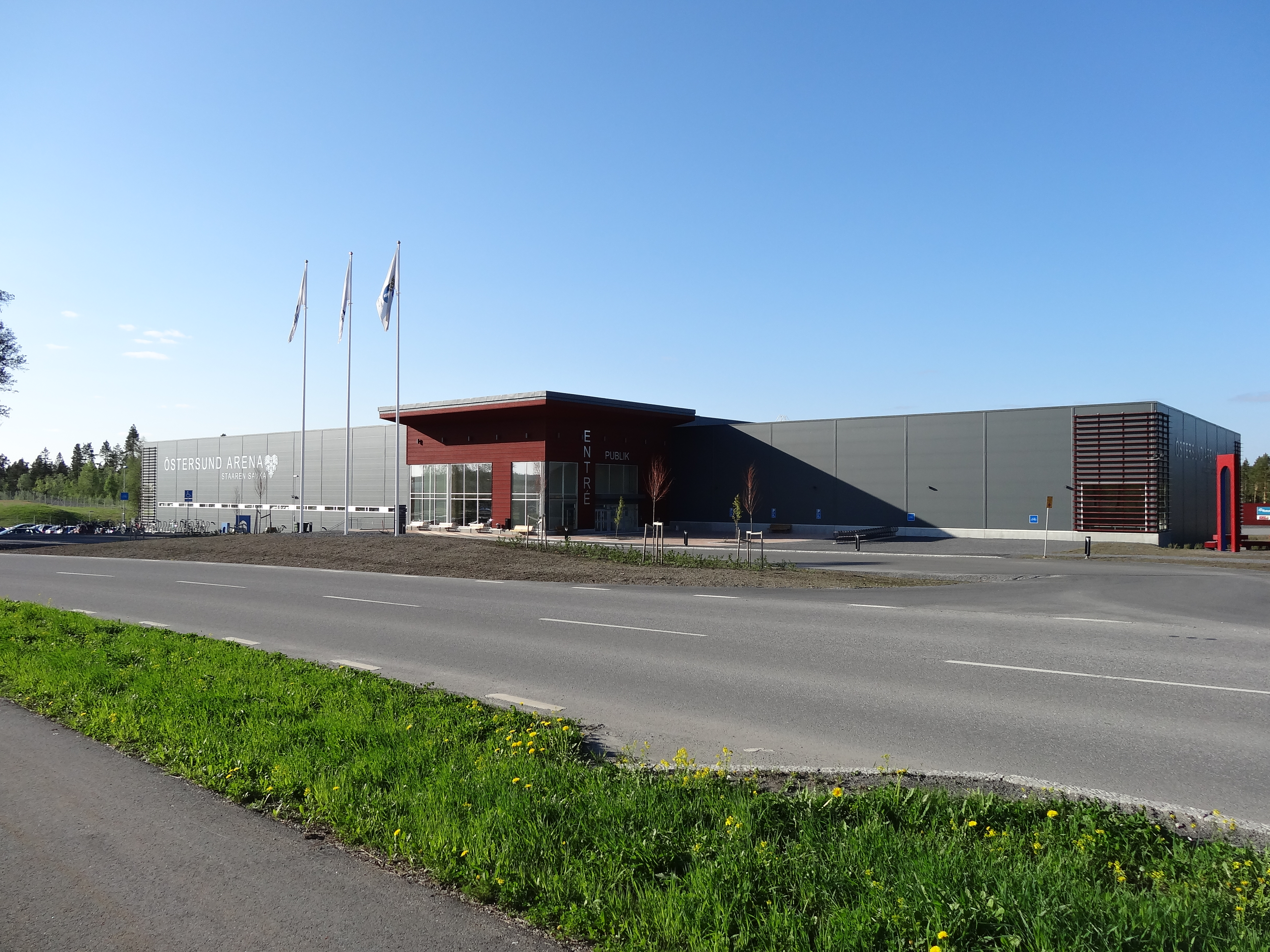
- Östersund Arena
- Interactive map of Östersund Arena
- Location: Östersund, Sweden
- Coordinates: 63°11′43″N 14°39′40″E
- Owner: Östersund Municipality
- Capacity: 3,000; 2,700 (hockey)

Construction
- Opened: 6 December 2013
- Cost: 260 million SEK (€26 million)
- Architects: Tirsén & Aili Arkitekter

Tenants
- Östersunds IK; IF Castor; Östersunds BS; Östersunds Konståkningsförening

Website
- ostersund.se

Östersund Arena is a multi-purpose venue in Östersund, Sweden. The arena can be used for curling, ice hockey, field hockey, figure skating, gymnastics. The arena opened in 2013, and replaced the Z-hallen for the Östersunds IK ice hockey team.

== Arena ==
The arena accommodates two ice hockey fields, a gymnasium, a restaurant and an artificially frozen outdoor bandy rink. The stadium is located to the north-west of Östersund near to the Östersund Ski Stadium and the Jämtkraft Arena football stadium.

The "A Hall" can accommodate 2,700 spectators for ice hockey games, including approximately 2,100 seats. The attendance record of 2,700 people was set of 24 January 2015 when Östersunds IK played Huddinge IK, and the match ended 2–0 to Östersunds IK.

The gymnastics hall is nearly 2,000 square metres (22,000 sq ft) in area and 10 metres (33 ft) in height.

The arena has, among other things, hosted the third semi-final of Melodifestivalen 2015, and the 2015 IPC Ice Sledge Hockey World Championships B-Pool.

== Tenants ==
The arena's tenants include; ice hockey team Östersunds IK, figure skating team IF Castor, figure skating team Östersunds Konståkningsförening, bandy team Östersunds BS, and gymnastics team Östersundsgymnasterna.
