= Dominic Larocque =

Canadian ice sledge hockey player

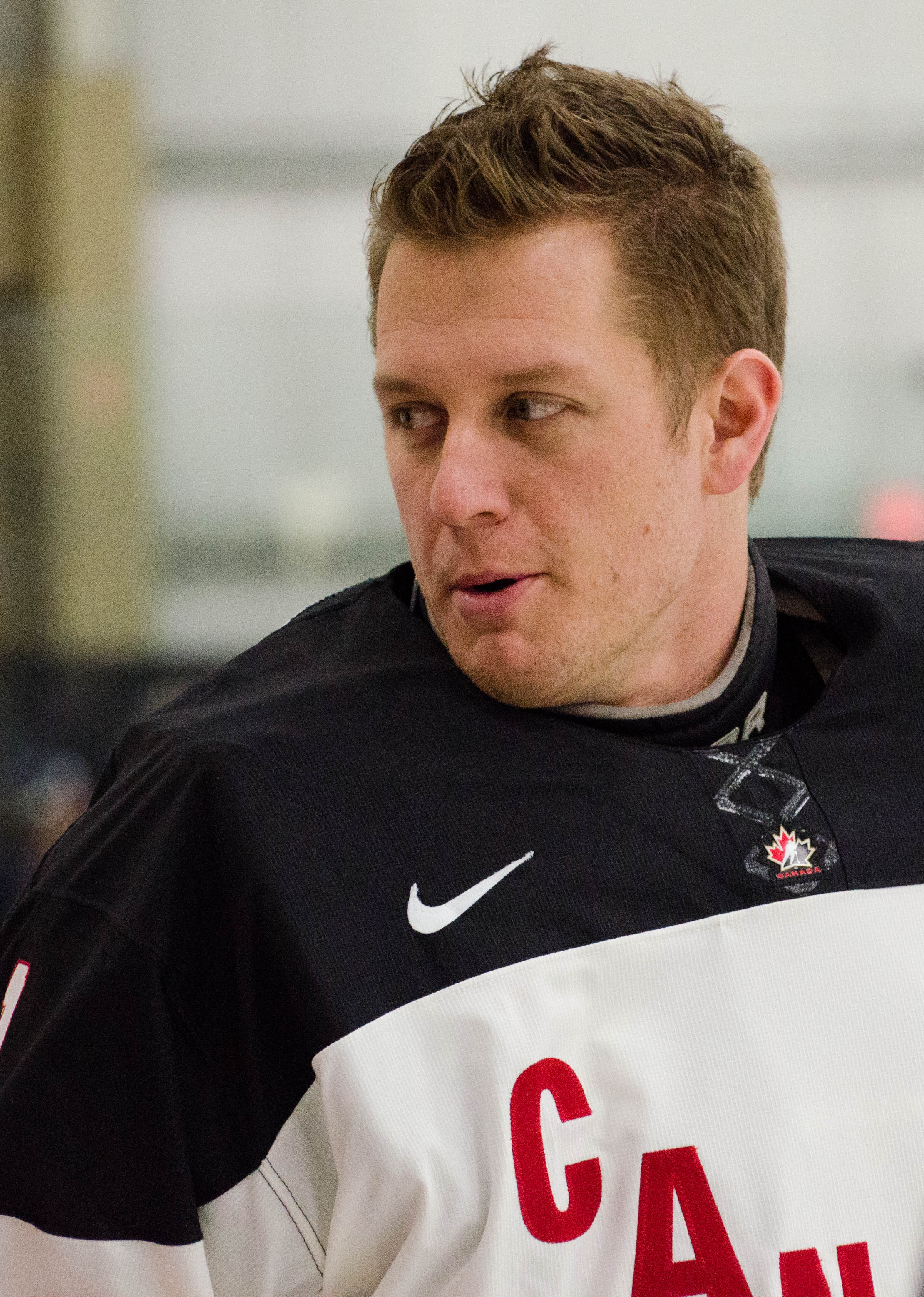
- Larocque in 2015

Personal information
- Born: July 30, 1987 (age 38) Salaberry-de-Valleyfield, Quebec, Canada
- Years active: 2009–present
- Height: 6 ft 0 in (183 cm)
- Weight: 184 lb (83 kg)

Sport
- Country: Canada
- Sport: Ice sledge hockey
Medal record
Para ice hockey
Representing Canada
Paralympic Games
Silver medal – second place	2018 Pyeongchang	Team competition
Silver medal – second place	2022 Beijing	Team competition
Bronze medal – third place	2014 Sochi	Team competition
World Championships
Gold medal – first place	2013 Goyang	Team competition
Gold medal – first place	2017 Gangneung	Team competition
Silver medal – second place	2015 Buffalo	Team competition
Silver medal – second place	2019 Ostrava	Team competition
Silver medal – second place	2021 Ostrava	Team competition
Silver medal – second place	2023 Moose Jaw	Team competition
Bronze medal – third place	2012 Hamar	Team competition

Dominic Larocque (born July 30, 1987) is a Canadian ice sledge hockey player.

== Early life ==
Larocque was born in Salaberry-de-Valleyfield, Quebec and lists his hometown as Quebec City. Larocque served in the Canadian Forces during the War in Afghanistan and had his left leg amputated above the knee as a result as injuries sustained while serving near the Panjwayi District when an improvised explosive device exploded under a vehicle he was riding in.

== Career ==
He began playing sledge hockey in 2009 in Montreal. Larocque won a gold medal with Team Canada at the 2013 IPC Ice Sledge Hockey World Championships, a bronze medal at the 2014 Winter Paralympics, and silver medals at the 2018 and 2022 Winter Paralympics.
