= Shcherbinka =

Shcherbinka Щербинка
- Town
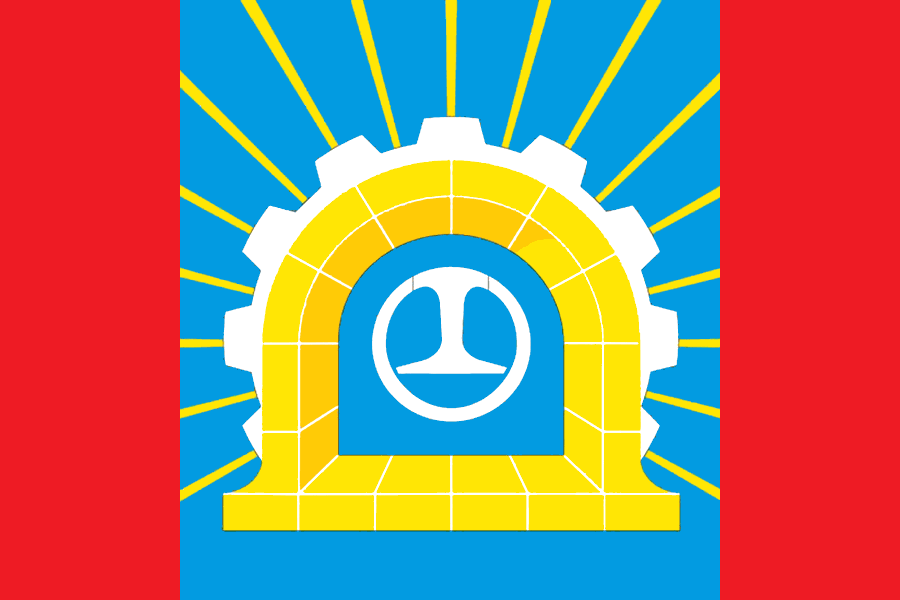
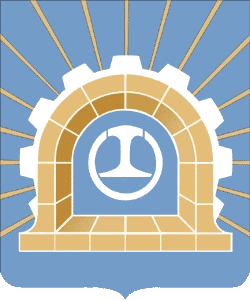
- Flag Coat of arms
- Shcherbinka Settlement within the federal city of Moscow
- Interactive map of Shcherbinka
- Location of Shcherbinka Shcherbinka (Moscow)
- Coordinates: 55°30′N 37°34′E
- Country: Russia
- Federal subject: Moscow
- Founded: late 14th century
- Town status since: 1975
- Elevation: 170 m (560 ft)

Population (2010 Census)
  - Total: 32,450
  - Estimate (2021): 56,531 (+74.2%)

Administrative status
  - Subordinated to: Novomoskovsky Administrative Okrug
- Time zone: UTC+
- Postal code: 142100
- OKTMO ID: 45932000

Shcherbinka (Russian: Ще́рбинка) is a town, formerly in Moscow Oblast, Russia, and since July 1, 2012 a federal city subject (settlement) of Moscow, Russia. It is located 37 kilometers (23 mi) south of the center of Moscow. Population: 32,450 (2010 census); 28,043 (2002 census); 28,011 (1989 Soviet census).

== History ==
It was founded in the late 14th century as a village of Shcherbinino (Щерби́нино) and granted town status in 1975.

In 1984, the western part of Shcherbinka was transferred to Moscow and is currently a part of Yuzhnoye Butovo District.

== Administrative and municipal status ==
Within the framework of administrative divisions, it was incorporated as Shcherbinka Town Under Oblast Jurisdiction—an administrative unit with the status equal to that of the districts. As a municipal division, Shcherbinka Town Under Oblast Jurisdiction was incorporated as Shcherbinka Urban Okrug.

On July 1, 2012, Shcherbinka was transferred to the federal city of Moscow and became a part of Novomoskovsky Administrative Okrug.

== Notable residents ==
- Maxim Andriyanov (born 1980), sledge hockey player
- Nikolay Kozlov (born 1972), water polo player
