= Ivan Kuznetsov (sledge hockey) =

Russian sledge hockey player

Personal information
- Nationality: Russia
- Born: 16 January 1986 (age 40)
Medal record
Para ice hockey
Representing Russia
Paralympic Games
Silver medal – second place	2014 Sochi	Team competition
World Championships
Bronze medal – third place	2013 Goyang	Team competition
Bronze medal – third place	2015 Buffalo	Team competition
European Championships
Gold medal – first place	2016 Östersund	Team competition
Representing RPC
World Championships
Bronze medal – third place	2021 Ostrava	Team competition

Ivan Kuznetsov (born 16 January 1986) is a Russian sledge hockey player. In 2013 he and his team won the bronze medal at the IPC Ice Sledge Hockey World Championships which were hosted in Goyang, South Korea. In the 2014 Winter Paralympics, he won the silver medal with Russia.
