= Dmitry Lisov =

Russian sledge hockey player

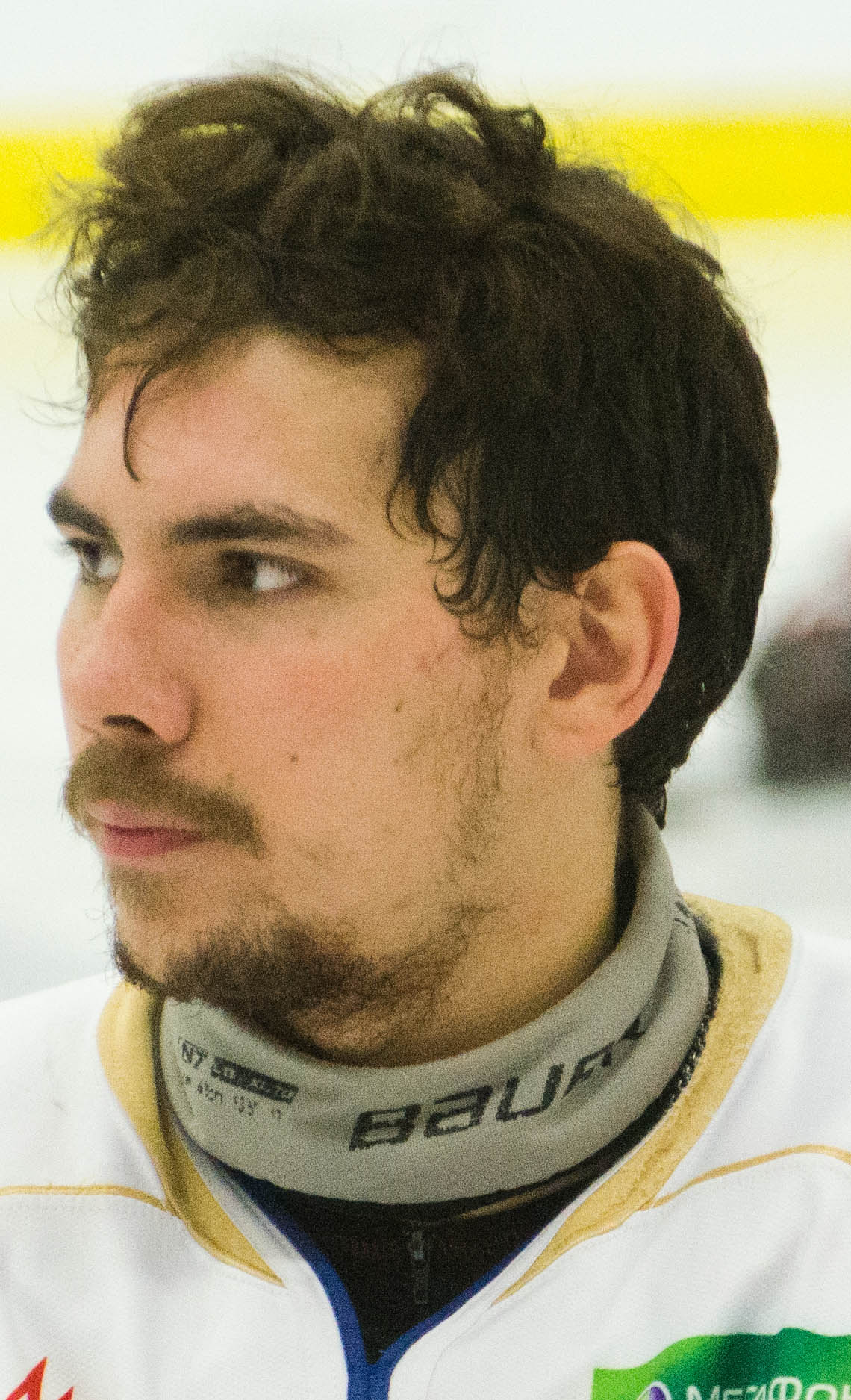
- Lisov in 2015

Personal information
- Nationality: Russia
- Born: 23 October 1990 (age 36)
Medal record
Para ice hockey
Representing Russia
Paralympic Games
Silver medal – second place	2014 Sochi	Team competition
World Championships
Bronze medal – third place	2013 Goyang	Team competition
Bronze medal – third place	2015 Buffalo	Team competition
European Championships
Gold medal – first place	2016 Östersund	Team competition
Representing RPC
World Championships
Bronze medal – third place	2021 Ostrava	Team competition

Dmitry Vladimirovich Lisov (Russian: Дми́трий Влади́мирович Ли́сов; born 23 October 1990) is a Russian sledge hockey player who won a silver medal at the 2014 Winter Paralympics in Sochi, Russia. Prior to it he participated at the 2013 IPC Ice Sledge Hockey World Championships where his team got a bronze medal.
