= Vladislav Lekomtsev =

Russian para-cross-country skier and para-biathlete

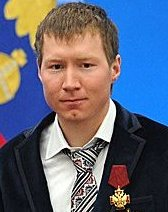
- Lekomtsev during the state awards ceremony in Sochi on March 17, 2014.

Personal information
- Born: 8 December 1994 (age 31) Romashkino, Udmurtia, Russia

Sport
- Sport: Skiing
Medal record
Representing Russia
Paralympic Games
Men's biathlon
| Gold medal – first place | 2014 Sochi | 7.5 km, standing |
Men's cross-country skiing
| Gold medal – first place | 2014 Sochi | 4 x 2.5 km open relay |
| Bronze medal – third place | 2014 Sochi | 20 km, standing |
| Bronze medal – third place | 2014 Sochi | 1 km sprint, standing |
| Bronze medal – third place | 2014 Sochi | 10 km, standing |

Vladislav Alekseyevich Lekomtsev (Russian: Владислав Алексеевич Лекомцев; born 8 December 1994) is a Russian para-cross-country skier and para-biathlete. During the 2014 Winter Paralympics he won a gold medal in 7.5 km biathlon race and then won bronze one for the 20 km cross country skiing at the same place.

== Biography ==
Vladislav Lekomtsev was born on 8 December 1994 in Romashkino, Alnashsky District, Udmurtia to Tamara Yakovlevna Lekomtseva and Aleksey Lekomtsev. Starting from elementary school, he and his three siblings worked part-time on a collective farm during their summer holidays to earn clothes and school supplies. On 8 August 2007, he lost his left arm and fractured the other one in an accident with a tractor, when he helped his father.

In 2009, Lekomtsev started practicing association football and athletics until his mother helped him to choose skiing.

He is a student of Udmurt State University in Izhevsk, where he is studying psychology.

He won the gold medal in the men's 12.5 km standing cross-country skiing event at the 2021 World Para Snow Sports Championships held in Lillehammer, Norway. He also won the gold medal in the men's long-distance standing cross-country skiing event. In biathlon, he won the gold medal in the men's 6 km standing event. He also won the gold medal in the men's 10 km standing biathlon event.

== Personal life ==
He is in a serious relationship with his girlfriend, Varvara Reshetnikova. They had been friends at school before starting to date in March 2013. On 22 February 2015, the couple welcomed their first child, a son they named Timofey.

== Awards ==
- Order "For Merit to the Fatherland", 4th class (17 March 2014) – for the huge contribution to the development of physical culture and sports, and for the high athletic performances at the 2014 Paralympic Winter Games in Sochi
- Merited Master of Sports of Russia (11 March 2014)
