= Andrey Dvinyaninov =

Russian sledge hockey player

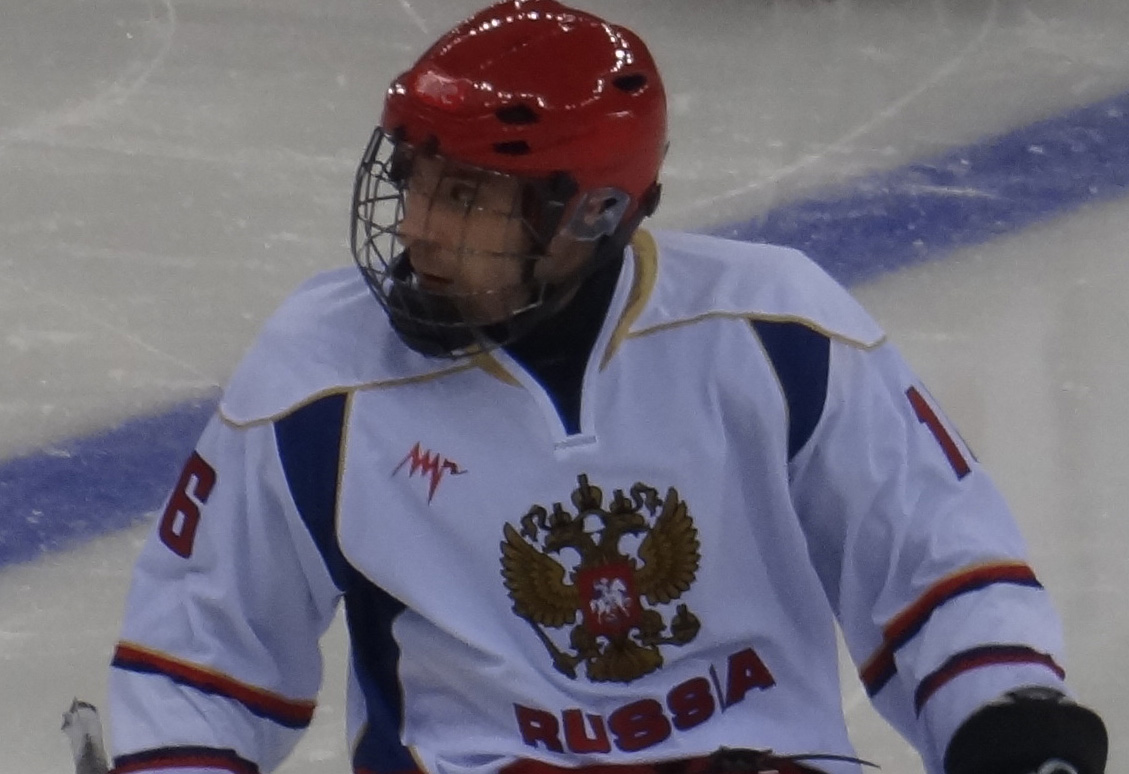
- Andrey Dvinyaninov 2014

Personal information
- Nationality: Russia
- Born: 3 September 1985 Izhevsk, Soviet Union
- Died: 24 June 2017 (aged 31) Postol, Zavyalovsky District, Udmurt Republic
Medal record
Para ice hockey
Representing Russia
Paralympic Games
Silver medal – second place	2014 Sochi	Team competition

Andrey Alekseyevich Dvinyaninov (3 September 1985 – 24 June 2017) was a Russian sledge hockey player. In the 2014 Winter Paralympics, he won the silver medal in the men's sledge hockey tournament with Russia.

== Life ==
He served in the army, and while serving his feet were frozen, and later amputated. In 2009 he began training in his home town for sledge hockey.

On June 24, 2017, Dvinyaninov became ill on his way to the shops, and his parents called the ambulance, which arrived roughly an hour later, but by then Dvinyaninov was already in critical condition, and died. Preliminary reports suggest he died of a heart attack, though there has yet to be an autopsy.
