= Ruslan Tuchin =

Russian sledge hockey player

Personal information
- Nationality: Russia
- Born: 3 October 1977 (age 48) Kovrov, Soviet Union
Medal record
Para ice hockey
Representing Russia
Paralympic Games
Silver medal – second place	2014 Sochi	Team competition
World Championships
Bronze medal – third place	2013 Goyang	Team competition

Ruslan Tuchin (born 3 October 1977) is a Russian sledge hockey player. In 2013 he and his team won the bronze medal at the IPC Ice Sledge Hockey World Championships which were hosted in Goyang, South Korea. In the 2014 Winter Paralympics, he won the silver medal with Russia.
