= Ilia Popov =

Russian sledge hockey player

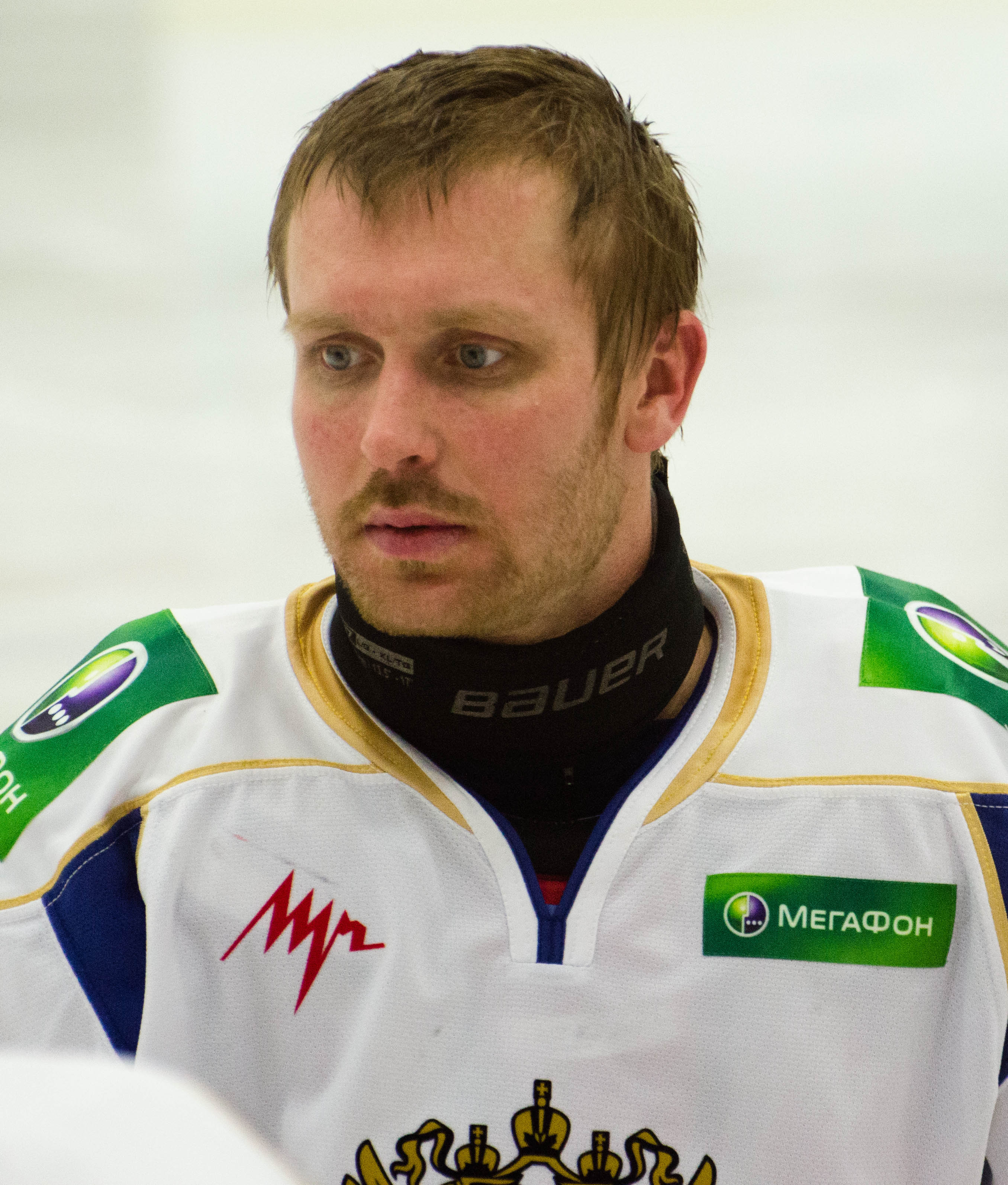
- Popov in 2015

Personal information
- Nationality: Russia
- Born: 17 May 1982 (age 44) Obninsk, Soviet Union
Medal record
Para ice hockey
Representing Russia
Paralympic Games
Silver medal – second place	2014 Sochi	Team competition
World Championships
Bronze medal – third place	2013 Goyang	Team competition
Representing RPC
World Championships
Bronze medal – third place	2021 Ostrava	Team competition

Ilia Popov (born 17 May 1982) is a Russian sledge hockey player. In 2013 he and his team won the bronze medal at the IPC Ice Sledge Hockey World Championships which were hosted in Goyang, South Korea. In the 2014 Winter Paralympics, he won the silver medal with Russia.
