= Nikolay Terentyev =

Russian ice sledge hockey player

Personal information
- Nationality: Russia
- Born: 21 March 1996 (age 30) Apatity, Russia
Medal record
Para ice hockey
Representing Russia
Paralympic Games
Silver medal – second place	2014 Sochi	Team competition
World Championships
Bronze medal – third place	2013 Goyang	Team competition
Bronze medal – third place	2015 Buffalo	Team competition
European Championships
Gold medal – first place	2016 Östersund	Team competition
Representing RPC
World Championships
Bronze medal – third place	2021 Ostrava	Team competition

Nikolay Terentyev (born 21 March 1996) is a Russian ice sledge hockey player from Murmansk. He is a double-amputee who initially began playing for White Bears in Moscow and two months later appeared at Russian Championships. Since then he participated at the 2013 IPC Ice Sledge Hockey World Championships at which he was the youngest to compete at. Even though he spent only 4 minutes at the game he and his team managed to win bronze medal. In September 2013 he took part at the International "4 Nations" Tournament which was followed by World Sledge Hockey Challenge which was hosted in Toronto, Canada in December of the same year. While there, he played 5 games in which he scored 5 goals and tied himself with Greg Westlake. During the 2014 Winter Paralympic Games in Sochi, Russia his team won a silver medal. Prior to it he scored a goal against Norway during which tournament his team won 4–0.
