= Inga Medvedeva =

Russian para-alpine skier (born 1979)

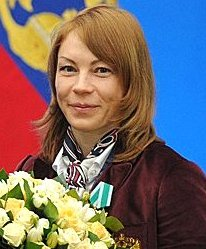

Personal information
- Born: 27 January 1979 (age 47)

Sport
- Sport: Alpine skiing
- Event(s): Downhill; Slalom
Medal record
Women's Alpine skiing
Representing Russia
Winter Paralympic Games
Silver medal – second place	2014 Sochi	Downhill, standing
Silver medal – second place	2014 Sochi	Salom, standing
Bronze medal – third place	2002 Salt Lake City	Downhill, standing

Inga Medvedeva (born 27 January 1979) is a Russian alpine skier and Paralympic medalist.

== Life ==
She won a bronze medal at the 2002 Winter Paralympics, and two silver medals at the 2014 Winter Paralympics.
