= Pablo Javier Robledo =

Argentine cross-country skier (born 1975)

Pablo Javier Robledo (born 23 July 1975) is a cross-country skier set to represent Argentina at the 2014 Winter Paralympics. He was chosen as Argentina's flag bearer for the opening ceremony of the 2014 Paralympic Winter Games in Sochi.
