= Rushan Minnegulov =

Russian biathlete and cross-country skier

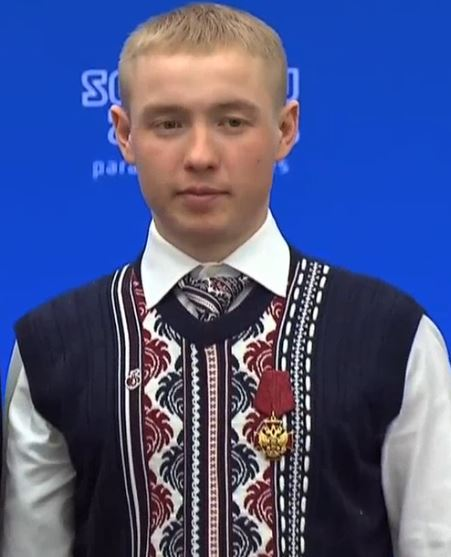
- Minnegulov in 2014

Sport
- Country: Russia
- Sport: Biathlon; Cross-country skiing

Rushan Minnegulov is a Russian biathlete and cross-country skier. He won the gold medal in the men's 20 km standing cross-country skiing event at the 2014 Winter Paralympics held in Sochi, Russia. He also won the silver medal in the men's 1 km sprint classic event and the gold medal in the 4 x 2.5 kilometre open relay event. He also competed in biathlon and cross-country skiing at the 2010 Winter Paralympics held in Vancouver, Canada.

In 2013, he won the gold medal in the open team relay event at the IPC Biathlon and Cross-Country Skiing World Championships held in Sollefteå, Sweden.

He won the silver medal in the men's long-distance standing cross-country skiing event at the 2021 World Para Snow Sports Championships held in Lillehammer, Norway. He also won the silver medal in the men's sprint standing cross-country skiing event.
