= Aleksandr Pronkov =

Russian Paralympic cross-country skier

Alexander Pronkov
Personal information
- Born: Penza Oblast, Russia

Sport
- Sport: Skiing
Medal record
Men's cross country skiing
Representing Russia
Olympic Games
Gold medal – first place	2014 Sochi	Men's 10 km freestyle

Alexander Pronkov is a Russian Paralympic cross country skier from Kozlovka village, Penza Oblast, Russia. who won a gold medal in the 10 km freestyle race at the 2014 Winter Paralympics.

He won the bronze medal in the men's 12.5 km standing cross-country skiing event at the 2021 World Para Snow Sports Championships held in Lillehammer, Norway. In biathlon, he won the silver medal in the men's 6 km standing event. He also won the silver medal in the men's 10 km standing biathlon event.
