= Oleg Ponomarev =

Russian Paralympic Nordic skier (born 1992)

Personal information
- Born: 30 May 1992 (age 34)

Sport
- Country: Russia
- Sport: Cross-country skiing
Medal record
Men's Cross-country skiing
Representing Russia
Paralympic Games
Bronze medal – third place	Sochi 2014	1 km sprint

Oleg Ponomarev (born 30 May 1992) is a Russian Paralympic Nordic skier who competed in cross-country skiing and biathlon at the 2014 Winter Paralympics, in Sochi. He won a bronze medal in the 1 km sprint for visually impaired athletes.

He won the bronze medal in the men's 10 km visually impaired biathlon event at the 2021 World Para Snow Sports Championships held in Lillehammer, Norway. He also won the gold medal in the men's long-distance visually impaired cross-country skiing event.
