= 2007 IPC Ice Sledge Hockey European Championships =

Tournament details
- Host country: Italy
- Venue: 1 (in 1 host city)
- Dates: November 18–24, 2007
- Teams: 7

Final positions
- Champions: Norway

Tournament statistics
- Games played: 21
- Goals scored: 140 (6.67 per game)
- Scoring leader(s): (Norway) Rolf Einar Pedersen (19 goals) (Germany) Udo Segreff (14 goals) (Sweden) Jens Kask (10 goals)

Awards
- MVP: (Norway) Rolf Einar Pedersen (33 points)

The 2nd IPC Ice Sledge Hockey European Championships was held between November 18, 2007 and November 24, 2007 at Palaghiaccio Ice Rink in Pinerolo, Turin, Italy. Participating 100 athletes from seven nations: Czech Republic, Estonia, Germany, Norway, Italy, Poland, Sweden. Pinerolo, a town of 35,000, located 50 km (31 mi) from Turin, was the host of 2006 Winter Olympics curling events. The Ice Sledge Hockey European Championships tournament was organised under the aegis of the EPC and the IPC by a Committee made up of Turin Olympic Park, operators of the Palaghiaccio, the Municipality of Pinerolo and the Alioth Sports Society, affiliated to the C.I.P. under its president Paolo Covato (Mayor of Pinerolo) and vice president Tiziana Nasi (President of the C.I.P. Piedmont).

== Final rankings ==
Gold	Silver	Bronze
Norway Audun Bakke; Helge Bjørnstad; Trygve S. Larsen; Lloyd Remi Johansen; Roger Johansen; Knut Andre Nordstoga; Wiggo Norseth; Rolf Einar Pedersen; Tommy Rovelstad; Kjell Vidar Røyne; Johan Siqveland; Stig Tore Svee; Morten Værnes	Czech Republic Jiří Berger; Erik Fojtík; Michal Geier; Zdeněk Hábl; Daniel Kalina; Zdeněk Klíma; Martin Kovář; Zdeněk Krupička; Pavel Kubeš; Tomáš Kvoch; Jan Matoušek; Zdeněk Šafránek; Michal Vápenka	Germany Gerd Bleidorn; Sebastian Disveld; Marius Hattendorf; Sebastian Kessler; Matthias Koch; Simon Kunst; Marco Lahrs; Robert Pabst; Rolf Rabe; Frank Rennhack; Udo Segreff; Sven Stumpe; Jörg Wedde

1. Norway
2. Czech Republic
3. Germany
4. Sweden
5. Estonia
6. Italy
7. Poland

== Tournament ==
=== Tournament summary ===
Pos	Team	Pld	W	L	GF	GA	GD	Pts	NOR	CZE	GER	SWE	EST	ITA	POL
1	Norway	6	6	0	39	4	+35	12		3–1	6–0	8–1	6–2	5–0	11–0
2	Czech Republic	6	5	1	19	5	+14	11	1–3		1–0	7–0	2–0	3–2	5–0
3	Germany	6	4	2	32	9	+23	10	0–6	0–1		6–1	3–0	13–1	10–0
4	Sweden	6	2	4	25	25	0	8	1–8	0–7	1–6		1–4	8–0	14–0
5	Estonia	6	2	4	12	14	−2	8	2–6	0–2	0–3	4–1		1–2	5–0
6	Italy	6	2	4	12	31	−19	8	0–5	2–3	1–13	0–8	2–1		7–1
7	Poland	6	0	6	1	52	−51	6	0–11	0–5	0–10	0–14	0–5	1–7	

Schedule

All times are local (UTC+2)

Sun November 18, 2007; 10:00 (UTC+2)	Italy	0 – 8 (0 - 4, 0 - 2, 0 - 2)	Sweden	Palaghiaccio Ice Rink, Pinerolo; Attendance: 240

Goals / 2:30 Marcus Holm; 2:35, 4:38, 5:31, 27:28 Jens Kask; 26:19 Gunnar From; 37:28 Dan Svensson; 41:01 Peter Melander

Sun November 18, 2007; 14:00 (UTC+2)	Germany	3 – 0 (1 - 0, 1 - 0, 1 - 0)	Estonia	Palaghiaccio Ice Rink, Pinerolo; Attendance: 27

Frank Rennhack 0:46; Udo Segreff 24:25, 39:11 / Goals

Sun November 18, 2007; 20:30 (UTC+2)	Poland	0 – 11 (0 - 3, 0 - 4, 0 - 3)	Norway	Palaghiaccio Ice Rink, Pinerolo; Attendance: 29

Goals / 1:15, 8:07, 12:49 (PP1), 20:06, 36:29 Rolf Einar Pedersen; 12:59 Johan Siqveland; 16:44 Tommy Rovelstad; 29:30 (PP1) Kjell Vidar Røyne; 31:17 Trygve S. Larsen; 32:27, 40:00 Audun Bakke

Mon November 19, 2007; 10:00 (UTC+2)	Germany	13 – 1 (6 - 0, 4 - 0, 3 - 1)	Italy	Palaghiaccio Ice Rink, Pinerolo; Attendance: 523

Sebastian Kessler 1:04, 5:34, 20:11, 33:40; Udo Segreff 3:34 (PP1), 6:04, 12:44 (PS), 17:09 (PP1), 28:25, 31:06, 36:48 (SH1); Sebastian Disveld 14:54 (SH1); Frank Rennhack 18:44 / Goals / 41:36 Gregory Leperdi

Mon November 19, 2007; 14:00 (UTC+2)	Norway	3 – 1 (1 - 1, 1 - 0, 1 - 0)	Czech Republic	Palaghiaccio Ice Rink, Pinerolo; Attendance: 61

Rolf Einar Pedersen 7:53 (PS), 32:45; Knut Andre Nordstoga 24:02 / Goals / 8:05 Zdeněk Šafránek

Mon November 19, 2007; 20:30 (UTC+2)	Estonia	5 – 0 (2 - 0, 2 - 0, 1 - 0)	Poland	Palaghiaccio Ice Rink, Pinerolo; Attendance: 23

Aleksander Jarlõkov 10:10; Kaido Kalm 13:24,18:11 (SH1), 20:50; Arvi Piirioja 32:29 (PP1) / Goals

Tue November 20, 2007; 10:00 (UTC+2)	Norway	5 – 0 (3 - 0, 1 - 0, 1 - 0)	Italy	Palaghiaccio Ice Rink, Pinerolo; Attendance: 623

Knut Andre Nordstoga 5:34; Tommy Rovelstad 9:03 (PP1), 12:31 (PP2); Rolf Einar Pedersen 22:04, 38:42 (PP1) / Goals

Tue November 20, 2007; 14:00 (UTC+2)	Sweden	14 – 0 (5 - 0, 4 - 0, 5 - 0)	Poland	Palaghiaccio Ice Rink, Pinerolo; Attendance: 51

Jens Kask 0:33, 2:49, 21:47 (SH), 34:58, 38:38 (SH); Marcus Holm 1:27, 14:13, 26:13, 40:40; Peter Melander 12:33, 25:29, 36:45 (PP1), 44:01 (PP1); Dedjo Engmark 27:48 / Goals

Tue November 20, 2007; 20:30 (UTC+2)	Czech Republic	2 – 0 (1 - 0, 1 - 0, 0 - 0)	Estonia	Palaghiaccio Ice Rink, Pinerolo; Attendance: 12

Zdeněk Klíma 2:41; Jiří Berger 24:10 / Goals

Wed November 21, 2007; 10:00 (UTC+2)	Germany	6 – 1 (1 - 0, 2 - 0, 3 - 1)	Sweden	Palaghiaccio Ice Rink, Pinerolo; Attendance: 150

Sebastian Kessler 10:29, 22:01; Robert Pabst 25:20; Jörg Wedde 36:48; Udo Segreff 40:52 (SH1); Sebastian Disveld 43:41 / Goals / 42:42 (PP1) Marcus Holm

Wed November 21, 2007; 14:00 (UTC+2)	Poland	0 – 5 (0 - 2, 0 - 1, 0 - 2)	Czech Republic	Palaghiaccio Ice Rink, Pinerolo; Attendance: 40

Goals / 2:23 Michal Geier; 10:59 Jiří Berger; 23:35 (PP1) Zdeněk Hábl; 31:17, 37:28 Erik Fojtík

Wed November 21, 2007; 20:30 (UTC+2)	Estonia	1 – 2 (0 - 0, 0 - 2, 1 - 0)	Italy	Palaghiaccio Ice Rink, Pinerolo; Attendance: 423

Imre Tiitsu 40:45 / Goals / 25:58 (PP2) Gregory Leperdi; 29:08 Gianluca Cavaliere

Thu November 22, 2007; 10:00 (UTC+2)	Czech Republic	2 – 1 (1 - 0, 1 - 0, 0 - 1)	Sweden	Palaghiaccio Ice Rink, Pinerolo; Attendance: 76

Zdeněk Krupička 7:52; Zdeněk Šafránek 20:55 / Goals / 31:49 Rasmus Lundgren

Thu November 22, 2007; 14:00 (UTC+2)	Estonia	2 – 6 (0 - 3, 0 - 2, 2 - 1)	Norway	Palaghiaccio Ice Rink, Pinerolo; Attendance: 6

Tarmo Eerma 34:52 (PP1); Aleksander Jarlõkov 40:21 (PP1) / Goals / 4:15, 10:05 (PP1), 14:49 Rolf Einar Pedersen; 17:59 Tommy Rovelstad; 18:34 Johan Siqveland; 42:16 (PP1) Stig Tore Svee

Thu November 22, 2007; 20:30 (UTC+2)	Poland	0 – 10 (0 - 2, 0 - 2, 0 - 6)	Germany	Palaghiaccio Ice Rink, Pinerolo; Attendance: 93

Goals / 1:01, 21:40, 39:13, 43:34 (PP1) Udo Segreff; 13:14 (SH1), 31:05 (PP1), 40:11 Sebastian Kessler; 23:04, 35:55 Frank Rennhack; 32:43 Robert Pabst

Fri November 23, 2007; 10:00 (UTC+2)	Sweden	1 – 8 (1 - 3, 0 - 3, 0 - 2)	Norway	Palaghiaccio Ice Rink, Pinerolo; Attendance: 52

Jens Kask 04:20 (PP1) / Goals / 6:27, 21:11, 26:15, 37:38, 40:29 (PP1) Rolf Einar Pedersen; 9:07 (PP1) Stig Tore Svee; 10:49 Knut Andre Nordstoga; 18:14 (PP1) Tommy Rovelstad

Fri November 23, 2007; 14:00 (UTC+2)	Czech Republic	1 – 0 (1 - 0, 0 - 0, 0 - 0)	Germany	Palaghiaccio Ice Rink, Pinerolo; Attendance: 83

Zdeněk Hábl 14:05 / Goals

Fri November 23, 2007; 20:30 (UTC+2)	Italy	7 – 1 (3 - 0, 2 - 1, 2 - 0)	Poland	Palaghiaccio Ice Rink, Pinerolo; Attendance: 523

Ivan Ghironzi 3:06; Florian Planker 10:26, 25:01; Ivan Galliano 11:34, 37:07 (PP1); Andrea Chiarotti 20:53 / Goals / 22:28 Jan Maliszak

Sat November 24, 2007; 10:00 (UTC+2)	Sweden	1 – 4 (1 - 1, 0 - 1, 0 - 2)	Estonia	Palaghiaccio Ice Rink, Pinerolo; Attendance: 42

Peter Melander 5:21 / Goals / 4:45, 34:48 Aleksander Jarlõkov; 21:08 (PP1) Tarmo Eerma; 42:00 Kaido Kalm

Sat November 24, 2007; 14:00 (UTC+2)	Italy	2 – 3 (1 - 1, 0 - 1, 1 - 1)	Czech Republic	Palaghiaccio Ice Rink, Pinerolo; Attendance: 423

Gianluca Cavaliere 5:39 (PP2); Gregory Leperdi 32:01 / Goals / 9:54 Martin Kovář; 23:04 Michal Geier; 41:34 Jiří Berger

Sat November 24, 2007; 18:00 (UTC+2)	Norway	6 – 0 (2 - 0, 1 - 0, 3 - 0)	Germany	Palaghiaccio Ice Rink, Pinerolo; Attendance: 303

Rolf Einar Pedersen 6:56, 13:19; Helge Bjørnstad 26:33 (PP1), 31:58 (PP2); Trygve S. Larsen 30:37 (PP1); Stig Tore Svee 34:28 / Goals

== See also ==
- Ice sledge hockey
- Ice hockey#Sledge hockey
- Ice sledge hockey at the 2006 Winter Paralympics
- 2004 IPC Ice Sledge Hockey World Championships
- 2008 IPC Ice Sledge Hockey World Championships
