= 2005 IPC Ice Sledge Hockey European Championships =

Tournament details
- Host country: Czech Republic
- Venue(s): 1 (in 1 host city)
- Dates: April 10 – April 16, 2005
- Teams: 6

Final positions
- Champions: Germany

Tournament statistics
- Games played: 15
- Goals scored: 96 (6.4 per game)
- Scoring leader(s): (Sweden) Marcus Holm (16 goals) (Germany) Udo Segreff (13 goals) (Germany) Sebastian Kessler (11 goals)

Awards
- MVP: (Germany) Udo Segreff (20 points)

The first IPC Ice Sledge Hockey European Championships was held between April 10, 2005 and April 16, 2005 in the eastern Moravian city of Zlín, Czech Republic. Participating 80 athletes from six nations: Czech Republic, Estonia, Germany, Great Britain, Italy and Sweden. The best European team joined the already qualified teams from Canada, Japan, Norway, Sweden, the USA and host country Italy to the Torino 2006 Paralympic Winter Games.

== Final rankings ==
Germany emerged as the winner of the tournament on goal difference, following a tie with Sweden in both the total number of ranking points and a tie game between the two teams. The final result was based on the total goals 'scored' less the total goals 'scored against'. As a result, the German team qualified for the Torino 2006 Paralympic Winter Games.

Gold	Silver	Bronze	4th	5th	6th
Germany Christoph Appelkamp; Gerd Bleidorn; Marius Hattendorf; Sebastian Kessler; Alexander Klein; Matthias Koch; Marco Lahrs; Robert Pabst; Raimund Patzelt; Rolf Rabe; Frank Rennhack; Udo Segreff; Sven Stumpe; Jörg Wedde; Jörg Wiesecke	Sweden Dedjo Engmark; Aron Andersson; Magnus Carlsson; Marcus Holm; Niklas Ingvarsson; Kenth Jonsson; Göran Karlsson; Jens Kask; Rasmus Lundgren; Leif Norgren; Frank Pedersen	Estonia Tarmo Eerma; Valeri Falkenberg; Aleksander Jarlõkov; Kaido Kalm C Tarmo Kolk; Ivar Liiv; Arvi Piirioja; Oleg Rodnov; Andrei Sokolov; Vjatšeslav Talanov; Imre Tiitsu; Alar Õige	Czech Republic Jiří Berger; Miloš Derka; Erik Fojtík; Libor Geier; Roman Herink; Miroslav Hrbek; Libor Hulín; Jiří Chadraba; Marek Junaštík; Daniel Kalina; Zdeněk Klíma; Martin Kovář; Zdeněk Krupička; Tomáš Kvoch; Michal Vápenka	Great Britain Simon Berry; Mark Briggs; Gary Farmer; David Hall; Karl Nicholson; Philip Saunders; Nathan Stephens; Stephen Thomas; Garry Vaughan; Ian Warner; Richard Whitehead; Russel Willey	Italy Ciro Amato; Bruno Balossetti; Danilo Bosio; Gianluca Cavaliere; Andrea Chiarotti; Giovanni Colaone; Fabrizio Cozzi; Ivan Ghironzi; Gregory Leperdi; Ambrogio Magistrelli; Francesco Mancusco; Hermann Oberparleiter; Gunther Rabanser; Marco Re Calegari; Claudio Zannotti

== Tournament ==
=== Tournament summary ===
Pos	Team	Pld	W	D	L	GF	GA	GD	Pts	GER	SWE	EST	CZE	GBR	ITA
1	Germany	5	4	1	0	33	2	+31	9	—	2–2	5–0	6–0	4–0	16–0
2	Sweden	5	4	1	0	30	3	+27	9	2–2	—	1–0	7–0	5–1	15–0
3	Estonia	5	3	0	2	16	6	+10	6	0–5	0–1	—	3–0	2–0	11–0
4	Czech Republic	5	2	0	3	7	16	−9	4	0–6	0–7	0–3	—	2–0	5–0
5	Great Britain	5	1	0	4	10	13	−3	2	0–4	1–5	0–2	0–2	—	9–0
6	Italy	5	0	0	5	0	56	−56	0	0–16	0–15	0–11	0–5	0–9	—

== See also ==
- Ice sledge hockey
- Ice hockey#Sledge hockey
- 2004 IPC Ice Sledge Hockey World Championships
- Ice sledge hockey at the 2006 Winter Paralympics
- 2007 IPC Ice Sledge Hockey European Championships
- 2008 IPC Ice Sledge Hockey World Championships
