= 2011 IPC Ice Sledge Hockey European Championships =

3rd IPC hockey tournament

Tournament details
- Host country: Sweden
- Venue: 1 (in 1 host city)
- Dates: February 12–20, 2011
- Teams: 10

Final positions
- Champions: Italy (1st title)
- Runners-up: Czech Republic
- Third place: Norway
- Fourth place: Estonia

Tournament statistics
- Games played: 29
- Goals scored: 210 (7.24 per game)
- Scoring leader: (Germany) Udo Segreff (24 points)

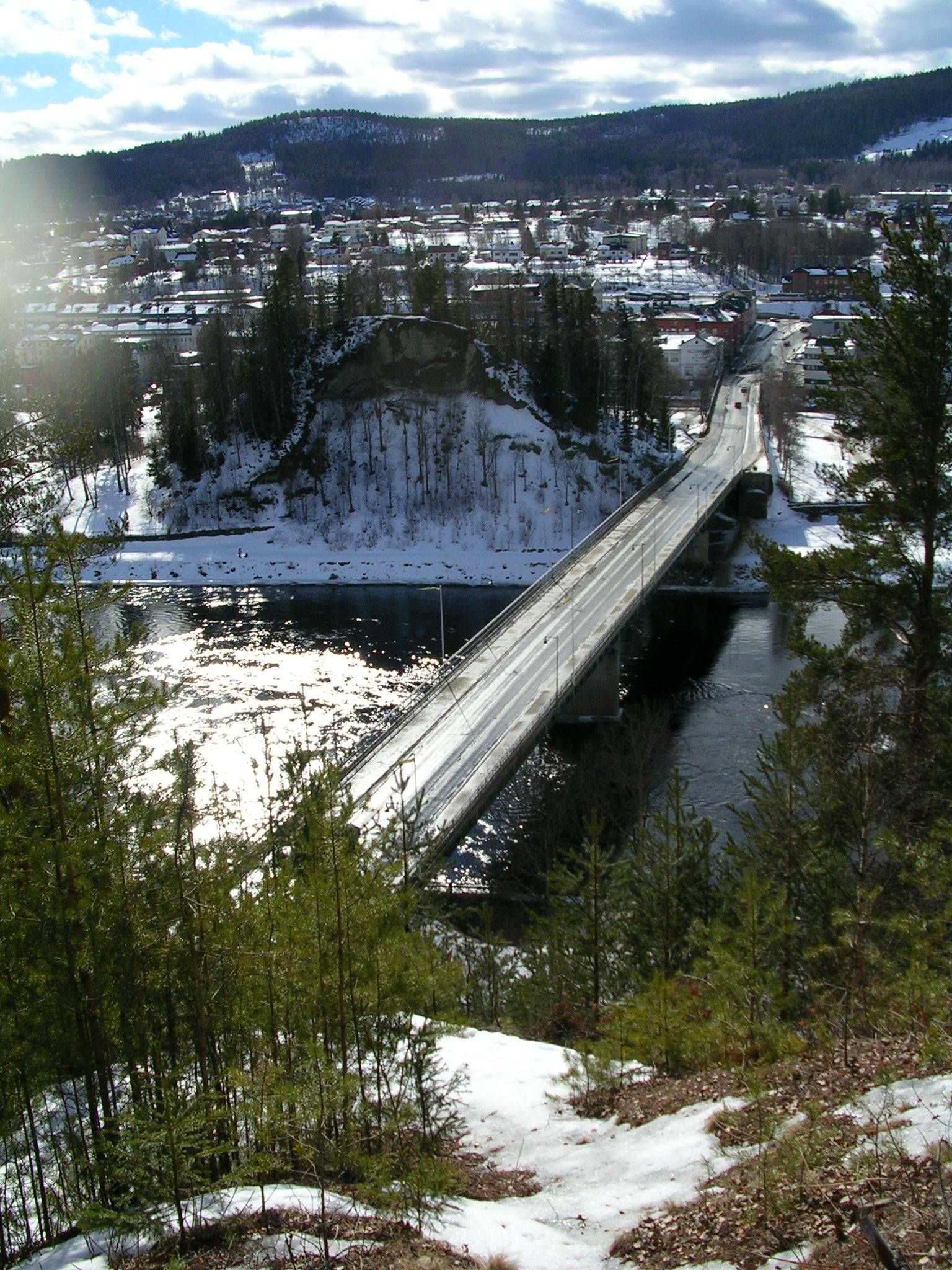
Sollefteå, Sweden

The 3rd IPC Ice Sledge Hockey European Championships was held between February 12, 2011, and February 20, 2011, at Niphallen in Sollefteå, Sweden. Participating 130 athletes from ten nations: Czech Republic, Estonia, Germany, Great Britain, Italy, Netherlands, Norway, Poland, Russia and Sweden.

The 2011 European Championships is held as part of the 2011 Paralympic Winter World Cup (PWWC 2011), which also includes alpine skiing, biathlon and cross-country skiing.

In the Championships' second match, Norway's sledge hockey team set an international sledge hockey scoring record with 21–0. The Swedish team set a new scoring record in the classification semifinals, with 23–0.

There was one woman competing at the Championships, the Netherlands' goalkeeper Betty Meijer.

== Team rosters ==
Czech Republic	Estonia	Germany	Great Britain	Italy
Jiří Berger; Erik Fojtík; Michal Geier; Zdeněk Hábl; Miroslav Hrbek; Zdeněk Klíma; Zdeněk Krupička; Pavel Kubeš; Tomáš Kvoch; Jan Matoušek; David Palát; Jiří Raul; Zdeněk Šafránek; Michal Vápenka	Tarmo Eerma; Valeri Falkenberg; Kaido Kalm; Tarmo Kolk; Meelis Koppelmann; Ivar Liiv; Alar Õige; Arvi Piirioja; Imre Tiitsu; Margus Vasar	Gerd Bleidorn; Sebastian Disveld; Torsten Elmer; Marius Hattendorf; Sebastian Kessler; Marco Lahrs; Robert Pabst; Jean Luca Pankowsky; Frank Rennhack; Udo Segreff; Lucas Sklorz; Sven Stumpe; Lars Uhlemann; Jörg Wedde	Bryan Hackworth; Callum Shakespeare; Duncan Slater; Gary Farmer; Karl Nicholson; Lee Coupe; Mark Briggs; Martin Austin; Martyn Compton; Matt Clarkson; Matt Coleman; Matt Lloyd; Rob Gaze; Simon Berry; Steve Brown	Gabriele Araudo; Bruno Balossetti; Gianluigi Cavaliere; Andrea Chiarotti; Giuseppe Condello; Greg Leperdy; Andrea Macrì; Florian Planker; Roberto Radice; Gianluigi Rosa; Igor Stella; Santino Stillitano; Werner Winkler
Netherlands	Norway	Poland	Russia	Sweden
Bas Akkerman; Sander Maan; Betty Meijer; Arthur Overtoom; Jurrian Raa; Sebastiaan Raayman; Melvin Smid; Michael ten Hoeve; Herman van Dorsten	Ole Bjarte Austevoll; Audun Bakke; Helge Bjornstad; Magnus Bøgle; Kjell Christian Hamar; Thomas Jacobsen; Loyd Remi Johansen; Roger Johansen; Jan Roger Klakegg; Knut Andre Nordstoga; Rolf Einar Pedersen; Tor Joakim Rivera; Stig Tore Svee; Morten Vaernes	Sylwester Czyż; Jarosław Czyżewski; Radosław Drapała; Sylwester Flis; Rafał Fusiek; Marcin Hebda; Zbigniew Kępiński; Jacek Kozłowski; Jan Maliszak; Andrzej Młynarczyk; Mateusz Szczygielski; Piotr Truszkowski; Jerzy Wójcikowski; Krzysztof Wojtaszek; Tomasz Woźny; Arkadiusz Zoga	Aleksey Amosov; Maxim Andrianov; Andrey Dvinyaninov; Mikhail Ivanov; Maxim Kuzminich; Ivan Kuzněcov; Dimitry Lisov; Kostantin Lobanov; Aleksei Lysov; Evgeny Petrov; Sergey Pudov; Vadim Selyukin; Pavel Shirobokov; Pavel Šklyajev; Ruslan Tuchin	Marcus Holm; Niklas Ingvarsson; Per Kasperi; Rasmus Lundgren; Ulf Nilsson; Niklas Rakos; Danne Svensson; Anders Wistrand

== Group round ==
=== Group A ===
Team	Pld	W	OTW	OTL	L	GF	GA	GD	Pts
Norway	4	4	0	0	0	44	3	+41	12
Estonia	4	2	1	0	1	27	8	+19	8
Germany	4	2	0	1	1	34	8	+26	7
Great Britain	4	1	0	0	3	1	56	−55	3
Netherlands	4	0	0	0	4	0	31	−31	0

Sat February 12, 2011; 17:00 (UTC+1)	Germany	10–0 (4–0, 4–0, 2–0)	Netherlands	Niphallen, Sollefteå

Game reference
1:16 Udo Segreff 7:25, 11:19 Marius Hattendorf; 10:38, 28:19 Sven Stumpe; 16:07 Frank Rennhack; 21:54, 40:12, 42:58 Sebastian Kessler 23:45 Lucas Sklorz Goals

Sat February 12, 2011; 20:30 (UTC+1)	Norway	5–2 ( 2–0, 2–1, 1–1 )	Estonia	Niphallen, Sollefteå

Game reference
4:14 Loyd Remi Johansen; 8:43, 16:50 Thomas Jacobsen; 29:38, 34:32 Rolf Einar Pedersen / Goals / 20:33 Imre Tiitsu; 42:30 Kaido Kalm
8 min	Penalties	4 min
16	Shots	15

Sun February 13, 2011; 17:00 (UTC+1)	Great Britain	1–0 (1–0, 0–0, 0–0)	Netherlands	Niphallen, Sollefteå

Game reference
2:56 Gary Farmer / Goals

Mon February 14, 2011; 10:00 (UTC+1)	Germany	3 – 4 GWS ( 2–1, 1–0, 0–2 ) (OT: 0–0) (SO: 0–1)	Estonia	Niphallen, Sollefteå

Game reference
1,22 Udo Segreff; 4,29, 18,58 Sebastian Disveld Goals 6,47 Ivar Liiv 33,32, 45:00 (GWG) Kaido Kalm 42,11 Tarmo Eerma

Mon February 14, 2011; 13:30 (UTC+1)	Norway	21–0 (7–0, 6–0, 8–0)	Great Britain	Niphallen, Sollefteå

Game reference
3:02, 27:58, 34:16 Stig Tore Svee; 4:02, 20:19 Magnus Bøgle; 5:03, 14:43, 26:43, 44:51 Rolf Einar Pedersen; 5:53, 9:30, 18:42, 29:01 Helge Bjornstad; 7:21 Ole Bjarte Austevoll; 28:42 Audun Bakke; 30:08 Morten Vaernes; 32:10, 32:30, 36:14 Thomas Jacobsen; 41:02 o.g. cred. Knut Andre Nordstoga; 44:06 Jan Roger Klakegg / Goals
4 min	Penalties	10 min
51	Shots	6

Tue February 15, 2011; 10:00 (UTC+1)	Norway	14–0 (7–0, 2–0, 5–0)	Netherlands	Niphallen, Sollefteå

Game reference
3:19, 30:14, 43:37 Stig Tore Svee; 5:51, 11:38 Rolf Einar Pedersen; 6:14, 34:18 Magnus Bøgle; 7:19 Ole Bjarte Austevoll; 8:43 Thomas Jacobsen; 12:03, 38:40 Morten Vaernes; 18:08 Loyd Remi Johansen; 28:49 Knut Andre Nordstoga; 40:07 Jan Roger Klakegg / Goals
4 min	Penalties	18 min
39	Shots	5

Wed February 16, 2011; 10:00 (UTC+1)	Estonia	6–0 (4–0, 0–0, 2–0)	Netherlands	Niphallen, Sollefteå

Game reference
0:41 Imre Tiitsu 8:43, 42:21 Arvi Piirloja; 11:36, 43:56 Kaido Kalm 14:36 Tarmo Eerma Goals

Wed February 16, 2011; 13:30 (UTC+1)	Germany	20–0 (8–0, 7–0, 5–0)	Great Britain	Niphallen, Sollefteå

Game reference
0:31 Torsten Ellmer 1:41, 9:29, 18:54, 30:30 Sebastian Disveld; 7:57, 13:57, 38:20 Udo Segreff; 9:29, 42:03 Sebastian Kessler; 11:36 Sven Stumpe; 13:09 Lucas Sklorz; 19:40, 20:48 Marius Hattendorf; 21:31, 21:45 Jan-Luca Pankowsky; 23:06 Frank Rennback; 26:18 Gerd Bleidorn 32:37, 44:31 Jörg Wedde Goals

Thu February 17, 2011; 10:00 (UTC+1)	Norway	4–1 (1–1, 1–0, 2–0)	Germany	Niphallen, Sollefteå

Game reference
14:48 Rolf-Einar Pedersen 18:38, 41:43 Helge Björnstad 42:45 Audun Bakke Goals 12:30 Udo Segreff
4 min	Penalties	19 min
20	Shots	11

Thu February 17, 2011; 13:30 (UTC+1)	Estonia	15–0 (5–0, 6–0, 4–0)	Great Britain	Niphallen, Sollefteå

Game reference
2:11 Meelis Koppelmann 5:47, 18:47 Arvi Piirloja; 8:00, 11:22, 24:55, 43:03 Imre Tiitsu; 10:32, 38:50, 44:50 Kaldo Kalm; 17:28, 18:25, 32:49 Tarmo Eerma 26:12, 27:26 Margus Vasar Goals

=== Group B ===
Team	Pld	W	OTW	OTL	L	GF	GA	GD	Pts
Czech Republic	4	4	0	0	0	20	3	+17	12
Italy	4	2	1	0	1	9	5	+4	8
Sweden	4	2	0	1	1	9	10	−1	7
Russia	4	1	0	0	3	6	14	−8	3
Poland	4	0	0	0	4	7	19	−12	0

Sat February 12, 2011; 10:00 (UTC+1)	Italy	3–0 (1–0, 1–0, 1–0)	Russia	Niphallen, Sollefteå

4:29 Werner Winkler 17:01 Gianluigi Rosa 35:37 Florian Planker Goals

Sat February 12, 2011; 13.30 (UTC+1)	Czech Republic	7–0 (4–0, 2–0, 1–0)	Sweden	Niphallen, Sollefteå

1:50 Zdenek Safranek 7:0, 13:45, 28:08 Michal Geier; 9:13, 24:06 Jiri Raul 44:45 Zdenek Krupicka Goals

Sun February 13, 2011; 20:30 (UTC+1)	Poland	2–4 (0–2, 1–0, 1–2)	Russia	Niphallen, Sollefteå

18:21, 36:19 Sylwester Flis / Goals / 8:36, 14:42 Andrey Dvinyaninov; 34:17, 37:28 Vadim Selyukin

Mon February 14, 2011; 17:00 (UTC+1)	Italy	1–0 ( 0–0, 0–0, 0–0 ) (OT: 0–0) (SO: 1–0)	Sweden	Niphallen, Sollefteå

54:55 (GWG) Florian Planker / Goals

Mon February 14, 2011; 20:30 (UTC+1)	Czech Republic	3–1 (1–0, 1–0, 1–1)	Poland	Niphallen, Sollefteå

6:07 David Palat 18:18 Erik Fojtik 30:33 Zdenek Habi Goals 31:46 Sylwester Czyz

Tue February 15, 2011; 13:30 (UTC+1)	Sweden	2–0 (1–0, 1–0, 0–0)	Russia	Niphallen, Sollefteå

1:31 Marcus Holm; 25:11 Per Kasperi / Goals

Wed February 16, 2011; 17:00 (UTC+1)	Czech Republic	7–2 (4–0, 3–1, 0–1)	Russia	Niphallen, Sollefteå; Attendance: 20

0:16, 26:35 Michal Geier 3:19, 13:31 Jiri Raul; 10:59, 17:23 Zdenek Habi 25:45 Jiri Berger Goals 29:45 Sergey Pudov; 44:25 Dimitry Lisov

Wed February 16, 2011; 20:30 (UTC+1)	Italy	5–2 (2–0, 3–2, 0–0)	Poland	Niphallen, Sollefteå

Thu February 17, 2011; 17:00 (UTC+1)	Czech Republic	3–0 (2–0, 0–0, 1–0)	Italy	Niphallen, Sollefteå

3:51 Jiri Berger 14:12 Michal Geier 38:37 Pavel Kubes Goals

Thu February 17, 2011; 20:30 (UTC+1)	Sweden	7–2 (2–1, 2–0, 3–1)	Poland	Niphallen, Sollefteå

3:43 Rasmus Lundgren 9:48, 20:55 Marcus Holm; 28:12 Anders Wistrand; 32:52, 41:59 Per Kasperi 35:50 Niklas Ingvarsson Goals 5:04 Sylwester Flis; 38:25 Sylwester Czyz

== Classification round ==
=== Ninth place game ===
Fri February 18, 2011; 17:00 (UTC+1)	Netherlands	0–2 (0–0, 0–1, 0–1)	Poland	Niphallen, Sollefteå

Game reference
Goals / 24:38 Sylwester Flis; 32:04 Piotr Truszkowski

=== Classification semifinals ===
Sat February 19, 2011; 10:00 (UTC+1)	Germany	4–0 (2–0, 1–0, 1–0)	Russia	Niphallen, Sollefteå

Game reference
6:54 Jörg Wedde 10:58, 44:02 Sebastian Disveld 20:31 Torsten Ellmer Goals

Sat February 19, 2011; 13:30 (UTC+1)	Sweden	23–0 (9–0, 9–0, 5–0)	Great Britain	Niphallen, Sollefteå

Game reference
1:55, 4:29, 7:13, 18:01, 29:39, 39:52, 41:14 Rasmus Lundgren 2:59, 13:53, 14:02, 16:35, 25:51, 38:45 Niklas Ingvarsson; 7:30, 10:11, 15:39, 21:08, 29:24, 43:47 Per Kasperi; 12:29, 25:10, 31:59 Marcus Holm 27:19 Niklas Rakos Goals

=== Seventh place game ===
Sun February 20, 2011; 10:00 (UTC+1)	Great Britain	1–7 (0–0, 0–4, 1–3)	Russia	Niphallen, Sollefteå

Game reference
39:24 Gary Farmer Goals 18:04 Pavel Shirobokov 24:36 Dimitry Lisov; 25:21 Vadim Selyukin; 28:36, 40:32 Evgeny Petrov; 40:57 Pavel Shklyaev 41:19 Maxim Kuzminykh

=== Fifth place game ===
Sun February 20, 2011; 13:30 (UTC+1)	Germany	1–5 (1–1, 0–1, 0–3)	Sweden	Niphallen, Sollefteå

Game reference
10:18 Frank Rennhack Goals 4:40, 25:14 Niklas Ingvarsson 31:34, 44:22 Marcus Holm 43:28 Niklas Rakos

== Medal round ==
Semifinals
A1	Norway	1
B2	Italy	2
B1	Czech Republic	1
A2	Estonia	0

Finals
B1	Czech Republic	0
B2	Italy	2
Third place
Norway	4
Estonia	0

=== Semifinals ===
Sat February 19, 2011; 17:00 (UTC+1)	Norway	1–2 (1–1, 0–0, 0–1)	Italy	Niphallen, Sollefteå; Attendance: 50

Game reference
6:27 Loyd Remi Johansen / Goals / 7:13 Florian Planker; 39:54 Andrea Chiarotti

Sat February 19, 2011; 20:30 (UTC+1)	Czech Republic	1–0 (0–0, 0–0, 1–0)	Estonia	Niphallen, Sollefteå; Attendance: 20

Game reference
41:51 Zdenek Habl / Goals

=== Bronze medal game ===
Sun February 20, 2011; 17:00 (UTC+1)	Norway	4–0 (2–0, 1–0, 1–0)	Estonia	Niphallen, Sollefteå; Attendance: 50

Game reference
1:24 Stig Tore Svee 11:26 Helge Björnstad; 20:43 Morten Värnes 39:51 Loyd Remi Johansen Goals

=== Gold medal game ===
Sun February 20, 2011; 20:30 (UTC+1)	Czech Republic	0–2 (0–1, 0–0, 0–1)	Italy	Niphallen, Sollefteå

Game reference
Goals / 2:25 Gregory Leperdi; 38:57 Florian Planker

2011 Ice Sledge Hockey European champions

Italy
1st title

=== Final standings ===
The final standings of the tournament.

Rank	Team
1st place, gold medalist(s)	Italy
2nd place, silver medalist(s)	Czech Republic
3rd place, bronze medalist(s)	Norway
4	Estonia
5	Sweden
6	Germany
7	Russia
8	Great Britain
9	Poland
10	Netherlands
