= 2019 World Para Ice Hockey Championships =

Tournament details
- Host country: Czech Republic
- Venue(s): Ostravar Aréna, Ostrava
- Dates: 27 April – 4 May
- Teams: 8

Final positions
- Champions: United States (4th title)
- Runners-up: Canada
- Third place: South Korea
- Fourth place: Czech Republic

Tournament statistics
- Games played: 20
- Goals scored: 129 (6.45 per game)
- Attendance: 64,748 (3,237 per game)
- Scoring leader: (United States) Declan Farmer (14 points)

Awards
- MVP: (Czech Republic) Michal Geier

Official website
- ParaOstrava2019.cz

The 2019 World Para Ice Hockey Championships was the 10th edition of World Para Ice Hockey Championships (previously known as the IPC Ice Sledge Hockey World Championships) held in 2019. The championships were divided into three tournaments.

The main event (Tournament A) was hosted by Ostrava, Czech Republic. The first matches were played on April 27 and the championships concluded with the final game played on May 4. It was the second time Ostrava World Para Ice Hockey Championships, as Ostrava hosted the Championships 10 years ago in 2009. The tournament achieved a record number of spectators, as their total number reached 65,000. It also broke the spectator record for a single game as the semifinal of hosting team against United States and bronze medal match against South Korea saw 8,600 spectators each, both surpassing the record from 2002 Winter Paralympics in Salt Lake City.

Tournament B was held in Berlin, Germany from November 17 to 22.

Tournament C was held in Vierumäki, Finland, from November 6 to 8, 2018, with three teams competing: Australia, China, and Finland.

== Format ==
In Tournament A the contestants were divided into two groups based on their ranking. The top two teams from Group A advanced directly into semi-finals while the remaining two teams together with the best two teams from Group B advanced to quarter-finals. Remaining two teams from Group B were relegated to B-Pool for the following championships.

Tournament B was played in a round-robin where every team played a match with every other team. The top two teams then advanced to A-Pool for championships in 2021 while the last team was relegated to 2020 C-Pool.

== Tournament A ==
=== Venue ===
Ostrava	Ostrava is located in Czech Republic
Ostravar Aréna Capacity: 10,004	Ostrava is located in Czech Republic

=== Preliminary round ===
All times are local (UTC+2).

==== Group A ====
Pos	Team	Pld	W	OTW	OTL	L	GF	GA	GD	Pts	Qualification
1	United States	3	3	0	0	0	17	1	+16	9	Semifinals
2	Canada	3	2	0	0	1	19	5	+14	6	Semifinals
3	South Korea	3	1	0	0	2	3	10	−7	3	Quarterfinals
4	Norway	3	0	0	0	3	4	27	−23	0	Quarterfinals

Source: IPC

27 April 2019; 12:00	South Korea	3–2 (2–1, 1–1, 0–0)	Norway	Ostravar Aréna, Ostrava; Attendance: 600

Game reference

Lee Jae-woong
Goalies
Johan Grønlie
Referee:
(Canada) Kevin Webinger
Linesmen:
(Canada) Matt Fergenbaum
(Sweden) Tony Rundstrom

	0–1	05:18 – Bakke (Værnes)
Cho BS (Jung SH, Lee JK) (PP) – 10:43	1–1
Lee JK (Cho BS, Jang DS) – 12:39	2–1
	2–2	18:11 – Bakke (Aanekre, Rivera)
Choi SW (Lee JS) – 21:32	3–2

8 min
Penalties
6 min
12
Shots
7

27 April 2019; 18:30	Canada	1–3 (0–0, 1–2, 0–1)	United States	Ostravar Aréna, Ostrava; Attendance: 2,149

Game reference

Dominic Larocque
Goalies
Steve Cash
Referee:
(Norway) Owe Luthcke
Linesmen:
(Sweden) Andreas Lunden
(Czech Republic) Leon Wesley

Westlake (Lavin) – 16:59	1–0
	1–1	Farmer (SH) – 19:06
	1–2	Grove (Douglas) – 21:11
	1–3	Farmer (ENG) – 44:55

4 min
Penalties
6 min
11
Shots
14

28 April 2019; 13:00	Norway	2–14 (0–6, 1–7, 1–1)	Canada	Ostravar Aréna, Ostrava; Attendance: 756

Game reference

Johan Grønlie
Erik Haugen (15:00)
Goalies
Corbin Watson
Referee:
(Japan) Sotaro Yamaguchi
Linesmen:
(United States) Brendan Lewis
(Czech Republic) Jan Vaněk

	0–1	02:57 – Lehoux (Smith, Hickey)
	0–2	05:22 – Westlake (Lavin, McGregor)
	0–3	06:46 – Bridges (Armstrong, Cozzolino)
	0–4	10:50 – Cozzolino (Armstrong)
	0–5	11:36 – Lehoux (Henry)
	0–6	12:17 – McGregor (Westlake)
	0–7	19:07 – Hickey (Bridges)
	0–8	19:30 – Hickey (McGregor, Lavin) (PP)
	0–9	21:17 – Bridges (Cozzolino)
Oiseth (Loyd Remi Solberg) – 22:52	1–9
	1–10	23:47 – Crane (Armstrong, Bridges)
	1–11	23:59 – McGregor (Hickey)
	1–12	25:46 – Bridges (Gemmell)
	1–13	27:54 – McGregor (Lavin)
Bakke (Værnes, Nordstoga) (PP) – 30:56	2–13
	2–14	42:38 – Lavin (McGregor, Hickey) (EA)

6 min
Penalties
4 min
8
Shots
25

28 April 2019; 16:30	United States	4–0 (2–0, 1–0, 1–0)	South Korea	Ostravar Aréna, Ostrava; Attendance: 1,513

Game reference

Jen Lee
Goalies
Yu Man-gyun
Referee:
(Denmark) Jacob Grumsen
Linesmen:
(China) Li Lintai
(Sweden) Andreas Lunden

Wallace (Pauls) (PP) – 03:30	1–0
Roybal (Farmer) (SH) – 11:27	2–0
Farmer (Pauls, Roybal) (SH) – 21:05	3–0
Grove (Pauls, Douglas) – 34:39	4–0

6 min
Penalties
4 min
22
Shots
3

30 April 2019; 13:00	Canada	4–0 (2–0, 1–0, 1–0)	South Korea	Ostravar Aréna, Ostrava; Attendance: 1,514

Game reference

Dominic Larocque
Goalies
Lee Jae-woong
Referee:
(United States) Andrew Bethmann
Linesmen:
(United States) Brendan Lewis
(Czech Republic) Jan Vaněk

McGregor (Larocque) – 05:50	1–0
Lavin (Westlake) – 13:56	2–0
Hickey (Armstrong) (SH) – 21:43	3–0
Westlake (McGregor) (PP) – 34:16	4–0

4 min
Penalties
10 min
15
Shots
1

30 April 2019; 16:30	United States	10–0 (5–0, 4–0, 1–0)	Norway	Ostravar Aréna, Ostrava; Attendance: 1,638

Game reference

Steve Cash
Jen Lee (30:00)
Goalies
Erik Haugen
Referee:
(Denmark) Jacob Grumsen
Linesmen:
(Canada) Matt Fergenbaum
(Sweden) Andreas Lunden

Douglas – 00:21	1–0
Pauls – 04:23	2–0
Wallace (Roybal, Gooley) – 06:07	3–0
Roman (McDermott, DeQuebec) – 12:12	4–0
Farmer (PP) – 13:47	5–0
Roman (McDermott, DeQuebec) – 15:14	6–0
Grove (Douglas, Farmer) – 21:02	7–0
Roybal (Wallace, McKee) – 21:36	8–0
McDermott (Roman) – 21:58	9–0
Zych (Farmer) – 35:32	10–0

2 min
Penalties
2 min
21
Shots
4

==== Group B ====
Pos	Team	Pld	W	OTW	OTL	L	GF	GA	GD	Pts	Qualification
1	Czech Republic (H)	3	3	0	0	0	18	0	+18	9	Quarterfinals
2	Italy	3	2	0	0	1	9	5	+4	6	Quarterfinals
3	Sweden	3	0	1	0	2	3	11	−8	2	Relegated to 2021 B-Pool
4	Japan	3	0	0	1	2	2	15	−13	1	Relegated to 2021 B-Pool

Source: IPC
(H) Host

27 April 2019; 9:00	Italy	4–0 (1–0, 2–0, 1–0)	Sweden	Ostravar Aréna, Ostrava; Attendance: 200

Game reference

Gabriele Araudo
Goalies
Andreas Nejman
Referee:
(Japan) Sotaro Yamaguchi
Linesmen:
(Finland) Lari Nittyla
(Czech Republic) Jan Vaněk

Larch – 14:46	1–0
Andreoni (Depaoli) – 20:33	2–0
Andreoni (Cavaliere, Radice) – 24:12	3–0
Kalegaris (Depaoli) – 35:54	4–0

6 min
Penalties
2 min
23
Shots
8

27 April 2019; 15:00	Czech Republic	8–0 (2–0, 2–0, 4–0)	Japan	Ostravar Aréna, Ostrava; Attendance: 7,224

Game reference

Martin Kudela
Goalies
Shinobu Fukushima
Referee:
(Denmark) Jacob Grumsen
Linesmen:
(United States) Brendan Lewis
(China) Li Lintai

Šafránek (Doležal) – 02:52	1–0
Kubeš (Hábl) – 10:52	2–0
Hábl (Geier, Palát) – 15:14	3–0
Geier (Kvoch) (PP) – 21:45	4–0
Kubeš (Hábl) – 30:20	5–0
Šafránek – 30:42	6–0
Hábl – 32:38	7–0
Kubeš (Hábl) – 41:02	8–0

4 min
Penalties
4 min
25
Shots
11

28 April 2019; 9:30	Japan	1–5 (0–2, 1–0, 0–3)	Italy	Ostravar Aréna, Ostrava; Attendance: 198

Game reference

Shinobu Fukushima
Goalies
Gabriele Araudo
Referee:
(United States) Andrew Bethmann
Linesmen:
(Sweden) Tony Rundstrom
(Czech Republic) Leon Wesley

	0–1	01:00 – Planker (Kerschbaumer, Larch)
	0–2	14:38 – Macri (Planker)
Kodama – 26:03	1–2
	1–3	34:16 – Enderle
	1–4	41:22 – Larch (Cavaliere, Depaoli)
	1–5	43:00 – Kalegaris

2 min
Penalties
4 min
12
Shots
25

28 April 2019; 20:00	Sweden	1–6 (1–3, 0–1, 0–2)	Czech Republic	Ostravar Aréna, Ostrava; Attendance: 4,895

Game reference

Ulf Nilsson
Goalies
Michal Vápenka
Referee:
(Canada) Kevin Webinger
Linesmen:
(Canada) Matt Fergenbaum
(Finland) Lari Nittyla

	0–1	01:34 – Raul (Wágner)
	0–2	04:03 – Geier (Hábl)
Ingvarsson (Dickson Gyllsten) (PP) – 10:41	1–2
	1–3	14:13 – Doležal (Geier, Hábl)
	1–4	19:11 – Krupička (Kvoch)
	1–5	39:27 – Hábl (Kvoch)
	1–6	40:49 – Geier (Hábl) (SH)

8 min
Penalties
8 min
3
Shots
24

30 April 2019; 9:30	Sweden	2–1 GWS (0–0, 0–1, 1–0) (OT: 0–0) (SO: 1–0)	Japan	Ostravar Aréna, Ostrava; Attendance: 2,357

Game reference

Andreas Nejman
Goalies
Shinobu Fukushima
Referee:
(Norway) Owe Luthcke
Linesmen:
(China) Li Lintai
(Czech Republic) Leon Wesley

	0–1	25:04 – Yoshikawa (Kodama)
Rakos (Hedberg) – 37:22	1–1
Dickson Gyllsten (GWG) – 50:00	2–1

10 min
Penalties
6 min
7
Shots
31

30 April 2019; 20:00	Italy	0–4 (0–3, 0–1, 0–0)	Czech Republic	Ostravar Aréna, Ostrava; Attendance: 7,700

Game reference

Gabriele Araudo
Julian Kasslatter (30:00)
Goalies
Michal Vápenka
Referee:
(Japan) Sotaro Yamaguchi
Linesmen:
(Finland) Lari Nittyla
(Sweden) Tony Rundstrom

0–1	04:51 – Kubeš (Hábl, Geier) (SH)
0–2	06:14 – Geier (Kvoch) (SH)
0–3	13:01 – Geier (Raul, Novotný) (PP)
0–4	15:55 – Raul (Šafránek) (PP)

10 min
Penalties
20 min
11
Shots
15

=== Playoff round ===
Quarterfinals
A4	Norway	0
B1	Czech Republic	5
A3	South Korea	6
B2	Italy	3

Semifinals
A1	United States	10
Czech Republic	2
A2	Canada	10
South Korea	0

Finals
United States (OT)	3
Canada	2

7th place match
Japan	3
Sweden (OT)	4

5th place match
Norway (OT)	1
Italy	0

Bronze medal match
South Korea	4
Czech Republic	1

Source: IPC

==== Seventh place match ====
1 May 2019; 13:00	Japan	3–4 OT (0–0, 1–1, 2–2) (OT: 0–1)	Sweden	Ostravar Aréna, Ostrava; Attendance: 243

Game reference

Shinobu Fukushima
Goalies
Andreas Nejman
Referee:
(United States) Andrew Bethmann
Linesmen:
(Canada) Matt Fergenbaum
(China) Li Lintai

	0–1	19:09 – Rakos (Dickson Gyllsten) (PP)
Kodama (Kumagai) – 29:01	1–1
Ishii (Shioya) – 32:16	2–1
	2–2	32:52 – Ingvarsson (Rakos)
	2–3	35:05 – Ingvarsson (Cederstam) (PP)
Sudo (Kumagai) (PP) – 39:07	3–3
	3–4	45:20 – Ingvarsson (Nilsson, Rakos)

4 min
Penalties
8 min
17
Shots
6

==== Quarterfinals ====
1 May 2019; 16:30	South Korea	6–3 (2–0, 2–2, 2–1)	Italy	Ostravar Aréna, Ostrava; Attendance: 1,874

Game reference

Lee Jae-woong
Goalies
Gabriele Araudo
Santino Stillitano (19:17)
Referee:
(Norway) Owe Luthcke
Linesmen:
(Sweden) Andreas Lunden
(Czech Republic) Leon Wesley

Cho BS (Choi KH) (PP) – 03:13	1–0
Jang JH (Cho YJ, Lee JS) (PP) – 06:08	2–0
	2–1	16:42 – Kalegaris
Ryu JH (Cho YJ, Jang JH) (PP2) – 19:05	3–1
Cho BS (Jang DS) (PP) – 19:17	4–1
	4–2	29:42 – Kafmann (Larch)
Jang DS (Jung SH, Lee JK) – 35:16	5–2
Cho BS (Lee JK, Jung SH) – 39:19	6–2
	6–3	42:58 – Depaoli

0 min
Penalties
14 min
16
Shots
8

1 May 2019; 20:00	Norway	0–5 (0–0, 0–0, 0–5)	Czech Republic	Ostravar Aréna, Ostrava; Attendance: 7,249

Game reference

Johan Grønlie
Goalies
Michal Vápenka
Referee:
(Canada) Kevin Webinger
Linesmen:
(United States) Brendan Lewis
(Sweden) Tony Rundstrom

0–1	34:53 – Novotný (Hábl, Kubeš)
0–2	39:43 – Geier (Hábl)
0–3	41:29 – Kubeš (ENG)
0–4	41:53 – Kvoch (Hábl) (ENG)
0–5	44:54 – Palát (Doležal)

6 min
Penalties
6 min
11
Shots
18

==== Fifth place match ====
3 May 2019; 13:00	Norway	1–0 OT (0–0, 0–0, 0–0) (OT: 1–0)	Italy	Ostravar Aréna, Ostrava; Attendance: 876

Game reference
Johan Grønlie	Goalies	Santino Stillitano	Referee: (United States) Andrew Bethmann; Linesmen: (United States) Brendan Lewis (Finland) Lari Nittyla
Værnes (Bogle) – 52:11 / 1–0			Referee: (United States) Andrew Bethmann; Linesmen: (United States) Brendan Lewis (Finland) Lari Nittyla
6 min	Penalties	6 min	Referee: (United States) Andrew Bethmann; Linesmen: (United States) Brendan Lewis (Finland) Lari Nittyla
12	Shots	15	Referee: (United States) Andrew Bethmann; Linesmen: (United States) Brendan Lewis (Finland) Lari Nittyla

==== Semifinals ====
3 May 2019; 16:30	Canada	10–0 (4–0, 4–0, 2–0)	South Korea	Ostravar Aréna, Ostrava; Attendance: 2,467

Game reference

Dominic Larocque
Goalies
Yu Man-gyun
Lee Jae-woong (30:00)
Referee:
(Denmark) Jacob Grumsen
Linesmen:
(Sweden) Tony Rundstrom
(Czech Republic) Jan Vaňek

Hickey (Larocque) – 06:00	1–0
Armstrong – 06:37	2–0
Hickey (McGregor, Bridges) (PP) – 08:08	3–0
Cozzolino (Bridges) – 13:56	4–0
Hickey (Westlake) – 16:22	5–0
McGregor (Lavin) – 20:41	6–0
Bridges (McGregor, Hickey) – 27:05	7–0
McGregor (Westlake) – 29:59	8–0
Hickey (Armstrong, Henry) – 36:37	9–0
Lavin (Cozzolino, Armstrong) – 43:35	10–0

4 min
Penalties
6 min
30
Shots
3

3 May 2019; 20:00	United States	10–2 (3–1, 7–1, 0–0)	Czech Republic	Ostravar Aréna, Ostrava; Attendance: 8,600

Game reference

Steve Cash
Goalies
Martin Kudela
Michal Vápenka (30:00)
Referee:
(Japan) Sotaro Yamaguchi
Linesmen:
(Canada) Matt Fergenbaum
(Sweden) Andreas Lunden

	0–1	03:10 – Geier
Wallace (Roybal) (PP) – 07:51	1–1
McDermott (Dodson, Roman) – 08:26	2–1
Farmer – 14:02	3–1
Wallace (Farmer) – 15:25	4–1
Roybal – 16:40	5–1
Wallace (Farmer) – 18:45	6–1
Pauls (Roybal) – 19:26	7–1
Farmer – 22:19	8–1
	8–2	23:13 – Novotný (Geier)
Wallace (Pauls) (PP) – 24:37	9–2
Wallace (Farmer) – 28:18	10–2

0 min
Penalties
4 min
26
Shots
8

==== Bronze medal match ====
4 May 2019; 13:00	South Korea	4–1 (1–0, 1–1, 2–0)	Czech Republic	Ostravar Aréna, Ostrava; Attendance: 8,600

Game reference

Lee Jae-woong
Goalies
Michal Vápenka
Referee:
(Canada) Kevin Webinger
Linesmen:
(Canada) Matt Fergenbaum
(United States) Brendan Lewis

Jung SH (Lee JK, Cho BS) – 10:30	1–0
Lee JS (Kim YS) – 19:05	2–0
	2–1	23:40 – Krupička (Kvoch)
Jung SH (Cho BS, Lee JK) – 38:14	3–1
Lee JK (Choi KH, Cho BS) – 40:38	4–1

10 min
Penalties
6 min
19
Shots
16

==== Final ====
4 May 2019; 16:30	United States	3–2 OT (0–0, 1–2, 1–0) (OT: 1–0)	Canada	Ostravar Aréna, Ostrava; Attendance: 4,095

Game reference

Steve Cash
Goalies
Dominic Larocque
Referee:
(Norway) Owe Luthcke
Linesmen:
(Sweden) Andreas Lunden
(Czech Republic) Lean Wesley

	0–1	21:36 – Hickey (McGregor, Bridges) (PP)
Pauls (Douglas, McKee) – 23:06	1–1
	1–2	25:37 – Armstrong (Cozzolino, Bridges)
Farmer (Pauls, Douglas) – 41:34	2–2
Roybal (Farmer) – 50:08	3–2

8 min
Penalties
2 min
22
Shots
10

=== Final ranking and statistics ===
==== Final ranking ====
Pos	Grp	Team	Next tournament
1	A	United States	2021 A-Pool, Group A
2	A	Canada	2021 A-Pool, Group A
3	A	South Korea	2021 A-Pool, Group A
4	B	Czech Republic	2021 A-Pool, Group A
5	A	Norway	2021 A-Pool, Group B
6	B	Italy	2021 A-Pool, Group B
7	B	Sweden	2021 B-Pool
8	B	Japan	2021 B-Pool

Pos = Final position; Grp = Group
Source: IPC

==== Scoring leaders ====
List shows the top skaters sorted by points, then goals, then by fewest games played.

#	Player	Gen	GP	G	A	Pts	PIM	+/-	Pos
1	(United States) Declan Farmer	M	5	7	7	14	0	+17	F
2	(Canada) Tyler McGregor	M	5	6	7	13	4	+9	F
3	(Czech Republic) Zdeněk Hábl	M	6	3	10	13	6	+12	F
4	(Canada) Liam Hickey	M	5	8	4	12	0	+14	D
5	(Czech Republic) Michal Geier	M	6	7	4	11	14	+12	F
6	(Canada) Billy Bridges	M	5	4	6	10	0	+10	F
7	(United States) Jack Wallace	M	5	7	1	8	4	+9	D
8	(South Korea) Cho Byeong-seok	M	4	4	4	8	2	+1	F
9	(United States) Brody Roybal	M	5	4	4	8	6	+8	F
10	(Canada) Zach Lavin	M	5	3	5	8	2	+9	F
10	(United States) Josh Pauls	M	5	3	5	8	0	+13	D

Gen = Gender; GP = Games played; G = Goals; A = Assists; Pts = Points; +/− = Plus/minus; PIM = Penalties in minutes; Pos = Position
Source: IPC

==== Goaltending leaders ====
Only the top five goaltenders, based on save percentage, who have played at least 40% of their team's minutes, are included in this list.

#	Player	Gen	MiP	SOG	GA	Sv%	GAA	SO
1	(Sweden) Andreas Nejman	M	95:00	54	5	90.74	2.37	0
2	(Czech Republic) Michal Vápenka	M	193:34	44	5	88.64	1.16	2
3	(Canada) Dominic Larocque	M	184:08	39	5	87.18	1.22	2
4	(United States) Steve Cash	M	170:08	32	5	84.38	1.32	0
5	(Italy) Gabriele Araudo	M	139:17	42	9	78.57	2.91	1

Gen = Gender; MiP = Minutes and seconds played; SOG = Shots on goal; GA = Goals against; GAA = Goals against average per 45 minutes; Sv% = Save percentage; SO = Shutouts
Source: IPC

==== Awards ====
- Best players selected by the directorate:
  - Best Goaltender: (Canada) Dominic Larocque
  - Best Defenceman: (Canada) Liam Hickey
  - Best Forward: (United States) Declan Farmer

Source: IPC

- Media All-Star: (Czech Republic) Michal Geier

Source: IPC

=== Team rosters ===
==== Canada ====
- Goalies: Corbin Watson, Dominic Larocque
- Defencemen: Rodney Crane, Tyrone Henry, Rob Armstrong, Kevin Sorley, Liam Hickey, James Gemmell
- Forwards: James Dunn, Zach Lavin, Tyler McGregor, Corbyn Smith, Greg Westlake, Billy Bridges, Dominic Cozzolino, Garrett Riley, Antoine Lehoux

==== Czech Republic ====
- Goalies: Martin Kudela, Michal Vápenka
- Defencemen: Tomáš Kvoch, Pavel Kubeš, Miroslav Hrbek, Pavel Doležal
- Forwards: Karel Wágner, Miroslav Novotný, Zdeněk Šafránek, Zdeněk Klíma, Lukáš Kořínek, Michal Geier, Jiří Raul, David Palát, Zdeněk Hábl, Zdeněk Krupička

==== Italy ====
- Goalies: Santino Stillitano, Gabriele Araudo
- Defencemen: Gian Luca Cavaliere, Roberto Radice, Andrea Macri, Emanuele Parolin, Alex Enderle, Julian Kasslatter, Stefan Kerschbaumer
- Forwards: Florian Planker, Sandro Kalegaris, Stephan Kafmann, Nils Larch, Francesco Torella, Alessandro Andreoni, Gabriele Lanza, Christoph Depaoli

==== Japan ====
- Goalies: Shinobu Fukushima, Atsuya Hoshiro
- Defencemen: Satoru Sudo, Eiji Misawa, Hideaki Ishii, Masaharu Kumagai
- Forwards: Kazuyoshi Niitsu, Masaya Hamamoto, Mamoru Yokishawa, Yoshihito Sakamoto, Taimei Shiba, Yoshihiro Shioya, Nao Kodama

==== Norway ====
- Goalies: Johan Grønlie, Erik Haugen
- Defencemen: Rolf Einar Pedersen, Knut Andre Nordstoga, Martin Hamre, Audun Bakke, Andreas Sundt
- Forwards: Emil Kirstistuen, Morten Værnes, Tor Joakim Rivera, Magnus Bogle, Loyd Remi Pallander Solberg, Lena Schrøder, Martin Grøsfjeld, Ola Oiseth, Torstein Aanekre

==== South Korea ====
- Goalies: Yu Man-gyun, Lee Jae-woong
- Defencemen: Choi Kwang-hyouk, Cho Young-jae, Kim Young-sung, Jang Dong-shin, Choi Si-woo
- Forwards: Lee Jun-yong, Ryu Jee-hyun, Jung Seung-hwan, Lee Ju-seung, Kim In-kyum, Kim Dea-jung, Cho Byeong-seok, Lee Jong-kyung, Kim Sang-lak, Jang Jong-ho

==== Sweden ====
- Goalies: Ulf Nilsson, Andreas Nejman
- Defencemen: Niklas Ingvarsson, Peter Nilsson, Staffan Siren
- Forwards: Johnny Pettersson, Christian Hedberg, Daniel Cederstam, Niklas Rakos, Maximilian Dickson Gyllsten

==== United States ====
- Goalies: Jen Lee, Steve Cash
- Defencemen: Ralph DeQuebec, Colin Gooley, Jack Wallace, Christopher Douglas, Josh Pauls
- Forwards: Brody Roybal, Travis Dodson, Luke McDermott, Kyle Zych, Declan Farmer, Noah Grove, Rico Roman, Josh Hargis, Kevin McKee

== Tournament B ==
=== Venue ===
All the matches were played in Berlin P09 Eissporthalle.

=== Results ===
Pos	Team	Pld	W	OTW	OTL	L	GF	GA	GD	Pts	Qualification
1	Russia	5	5	0	0	0	74	1	+73	15	Advanced to 2021 A-Pool
2	Slovakia	5	3	1	0	1	29	12	+17	11	Advanced to 2021 A-Pool
3	China	5	3	0	0	2	40	6	+34	9	
4	Germany (H)	5	2	0	1	2	31	16	+15	7	
5	Poland	5	1	0	0	4	3	70	−67	3	
6	Great Britain	5	0	0	0	5	3	75	−72	0	Relegated to 2020 C-Pool

Source: IPC
(H) Host

17 Nov 2019; 11:00	Slovakia	14–1 (2–0, 6–0, 6–1)	Great Britain	P09 Eissporthalle, Berlin; Attendance: 47

Game reference

17 Nov 2019; 15:00	Russia	27–0 (7–0, 9–0, 11–0)	Poland	P09 Eissporthalle, Berlin; Attendance: 47

Game reference

17 Nov 2019; 19:00	China	4–1 (2–0, 1–1, 1–0)	Germany	P09 Eissporthalle, Berlin; Attendance: 618

Game reference

18 Nov 2019; 11:00	Russia	25–0 (7–0, 8–0, 10–0)	Great Britain	P09 Eissporthalle, Berlin; Attendance: 53

Game reference

18 Nov 2019; 15:00	Slovakia	2–1 (1–1, 0–0, 1–0)	China	P09 Eissporthalle, Berlin; Attendance: 43

Game reference

18 Nov 2019; 19:00	Poland	0–13 (0–5, 0–6, 0–2)	Germany	P09 Eissporthalle, Berlin; Attendance: 57

Game reference

19 Nov 2019; 11:00	Slovakia	0–9 (0–1, 0–3, 0–5)	Russia	P09 Eissporthalle, Berlin; Attendance: 27

Game reference

19 Nov 2019; 15:00	Poland	0–17 (0–3, 0–4, 0–10)	China	P09 Eissporthalle, Berlin; Attendance: 23

Game reference

19 Nov 2019; 19:00	Germany	16–0 (5–0, 8–0, 3–0)	Great Britain	P09 Eissporthalle, Berlin; Attendance: 192

Game reference

21 Nov 2019; 11:00	Great Britain	2–3 (2–2, 0–0, 0–1)	Poland	P09 Eissporthalle, Berlin; Attendance: 67

Game reference

21 Nov 2019; 15:00	China	1–3 (0–2, 0–0, 1–1)	Russia	P09 Eissporthalle, Berlin; Attendance: 87

Game reference

21 Nov 2019; 19:00	Germany	1–2 OT (1–0, 0–1, 0–0) (OT: 0–1)	Slovakia	P09 Eissporthalle, Berlin

Game reference

22 Nov 2019; 11:00	Great Britain	0–17 (0–7, 0–3, 0–7)	China	P09 Eissporthalle, Berlin; Attendance: 125

Game reference

22 Nov 2019; 15:00	Slovakia	11–0 (2–0, 5–0, 4–0)	Poland	P09 Eissporthalle, Berlin; Attendance: 38

Game reference

22 Nov 2019; 19:00	Germany	0–10 (0–2, 0–5, 0–3)	Russia	P09 Eissporthalle, Berlin; Attendance: 511

Game reference

=== Team rosters ===
==== China ====
Bai Xue Song, Che Hang, Cui Yu Tao, Guo Xi Zhu, Hu Guang Jian, Ji Yan Zhao, Li Zhen Yang, Qiu Dian Peng, Shen Yi Feng, Song Xiao Dong, Tian Jin Tao, Wang Ju Jiang, Wang Wei, Wang Zhi Dong, Xu Jin Qiang, Zhang Zheng, Zhu Zhan Fu

==== Germany ====
Finn Bentzen, Klaus Brzoska, Bas Disveld, Bernhard Hering, Christian Jaster, Nils Krueger, Ingo Kuhli-Lauenstein, Simon Kunst, Veit Mühlhans, Robert Pabst, Christian Pilz, Hugo Raedler, Felix Schrader, Lucas Sklorz, Joerg Wedde, Jacob Wolff

==== Great Britain ====
Anthony Booth, Tyler Christopher, Matt Clarkson, Mark Colquitt, Bryan Hackworth, Dean Lahan, Jonathon Le Galloudec, Karl Nicholson, Martin Quinn, Scott Trigg-Turner, Matt Woollias

==== Poland ====
Łukasz Ciuła, Radosław Drapała, Sylwester Flis, Marcin Hebda, Sebastian Kartosz, Andrzej Młynarczyk, Mateusz Murawski, Krzysztof Sekulski, Mariusz Zieliński

==== Russia ====
Aleksei Eremin, Dmitrii Galkin, Vladimir Kamantsev, Airat Khamzin, Maksim Kuzminykh, Ivan Kuznetsov, Dmitrii Lisov, Igor Maletskiy, Mikhail Miachin, Evgenii Petrov, Evgenii Plotnikov, Roman Severin, Konstantin Shikhov, Andrey Sokolov, Nikolai Terentev, Vasilii Varlakov, Ilia Volkov

==== Slovakia ====
Slavomir Ferenčík, Erik Fojtík, Martin Joppa, Miroslav Kardoš, Peter Kaščák, Dávid Korman, Eduard Lepáček, Marián Ligda, Miroslav Pastucha, Miroslav Stašák, Peter Štít, Róbert Turic, Miloš Večerek

== Tournament C ==
=== Venue ===
All the matches were held in Vierumäki Sport Institute.

=== Results ===
Pos	Team	Pld	W	OTW	OTL	L	GF	GA	GD	Pts	Qualification
1	China	2	2	0	0	0	45	0	+45	6	Tournament B
2	Finland (H)	2	1	0	0	1	6	6	0	3	
3	Australia	2	0	0	0	2	1	46	−45	0	

Source: IPC
(H) Host

6 Nov 2018; 15:00	Australia	1–6 (0–3, 0–2, 1–1)	Finland	Vierumäki Sport Institute; Attendance: 102

Game reference

7 Nov 2018; 15:00	China	40–0 (14–0, 15–0, 11–0)	Australia	Vierumäki Sport Institute; Attendance: 52

Game reference

8 Nov 2018; 15:00	Finland	0–5 (0–2, 0–2, 0–1)	China	Vierumäki Sport Institute; Attendance: 124

Game reference
