= I Juseung =

I Juseung (Korean: 이주승) may refer to:

- Lee Joo-seung (born 1989), South Korean actor
- Lee Ju-seung (born 1990), South Korean sledge hockey player
