= Ciaz (disambiguation) =

Ciaz may refer to:

- Suzuki Ciaz, car produced by Suzuki
- Ciaz, nickname of italian ice hockey and ice sledge hockey player and coach Andrea Chiarotti
