= Thomas Jacobsen (sledge hockey) =

Norwegian ice sledge hockey player

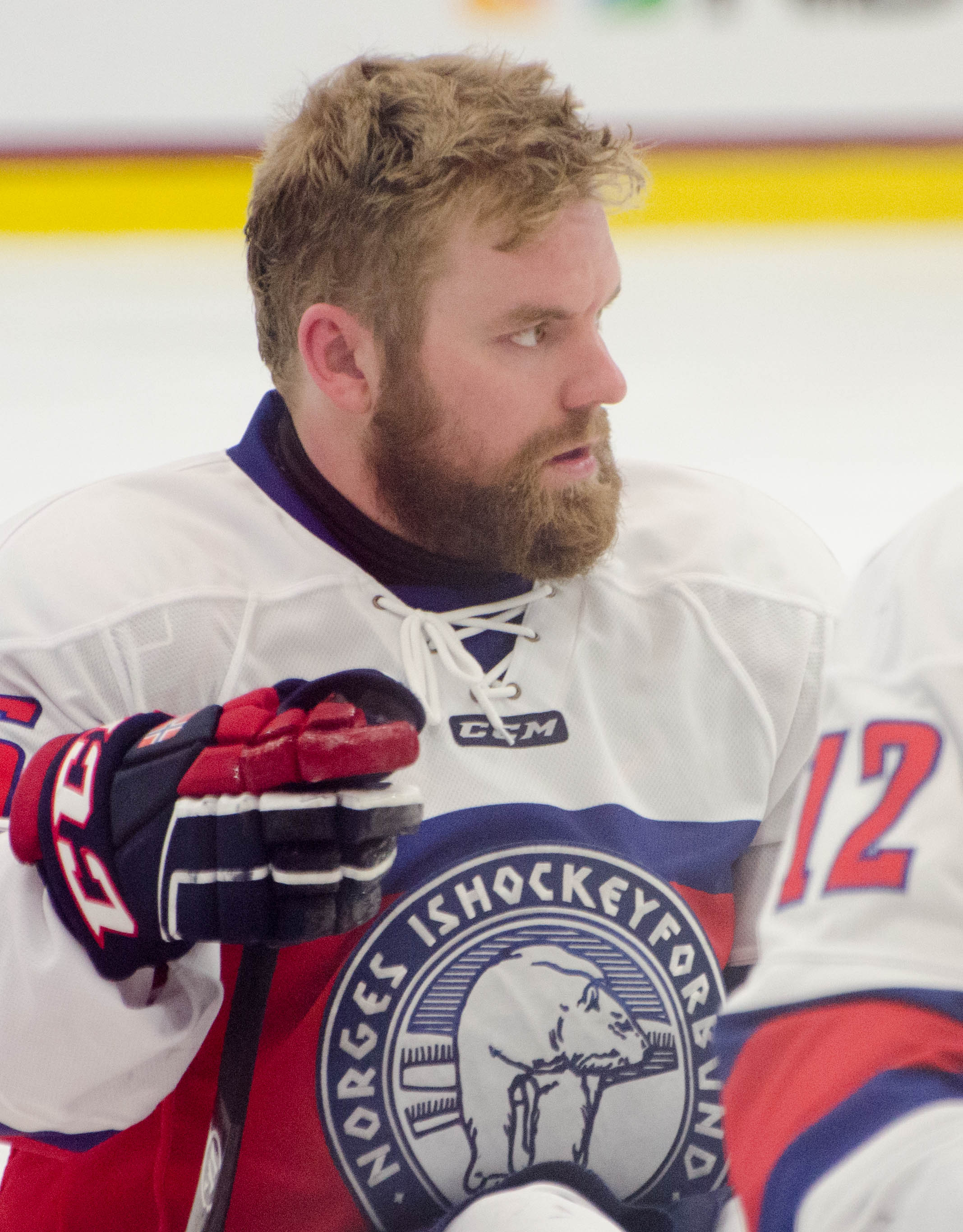
- Jacobsen at the 2015 IPC Ice Sledge Hockey World Championships in Buffalo, New York
- Born: 4 November 1987 (age 38) Fredrikstad, Norway
- Position: Defense
- Played for: Oslo Sledge Hockey Club
- National team: Norway
- Playing career: 2009–present
Medal record
Men's para ice hockey
Representing Norway
European Championships
Bronze medal – third place	2011 Sollefteå	Team competition

Thomas Jacobsen (born 4 November 1987) is a Norwegian ice sledge hockey player.

He took the bronze medal with the Norwegian sledge hockey team at the 2010 Winter Paralympics in Vancouver, British Columbia, Canada.
