= James Gemmell =

Canadian ice sledge hockey player

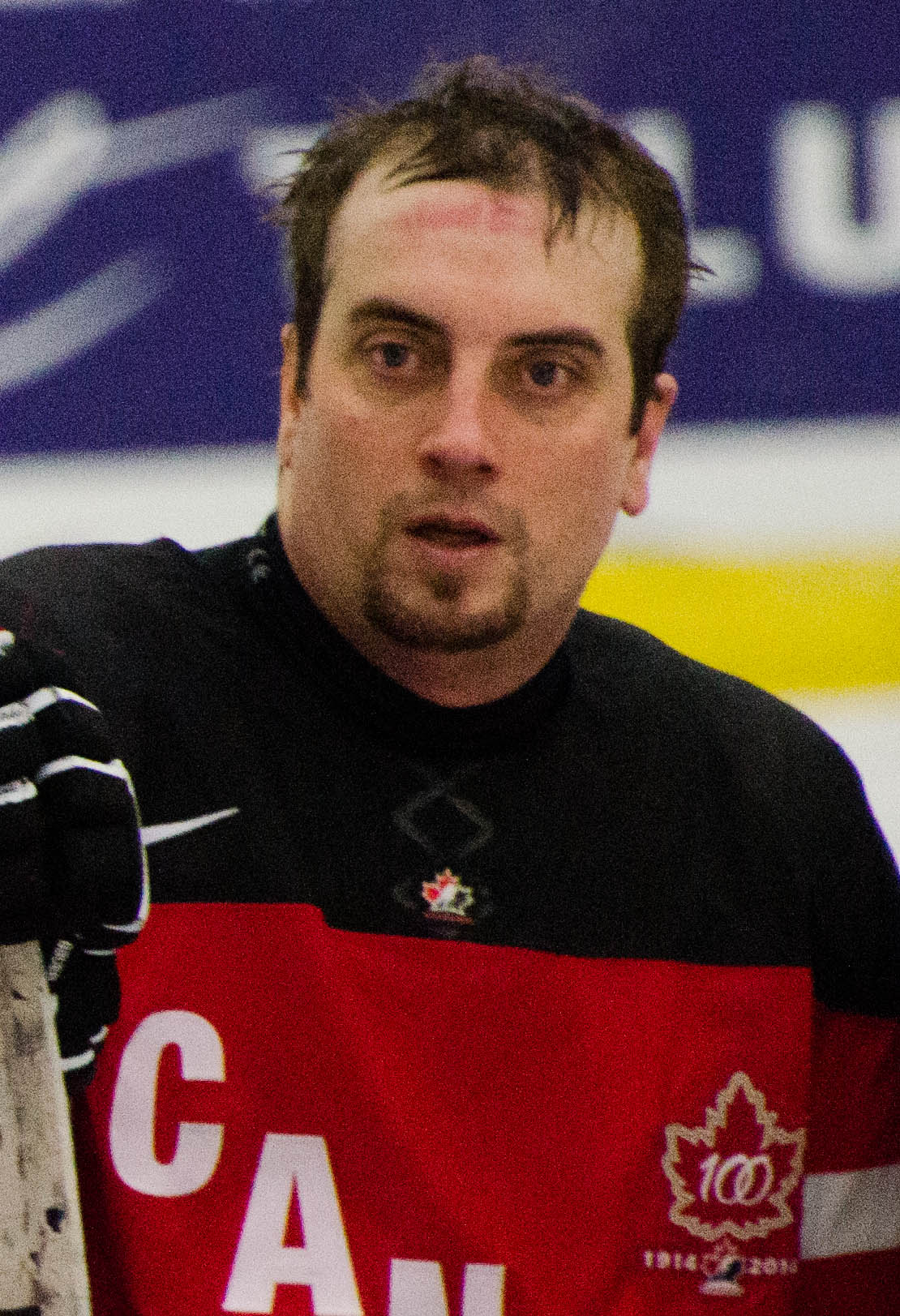
- Gemmell in 2015

Personal information
- Born: April 26, 1980 (age 46) 100 Mile House, British Columbia, Canada
- Years active: 2006–present
- Height: 5 ft 11 in (180 cm)
- Weight: 175 lb (79 kg)

Sport
- Country: Canada
- Sport: Ice sledge hockey
- Position: Defence
Medal record
Para ice hockey
Representing Canada
Paralympic Games
Silver medal – second place	2018 Pyeongchang	Team competition
Bronze medal – third place	2014 Sochi	Team competition
World Championships
Bronze medal – third place	2012 Hamar	Team competition
Gold medal – first place	2013 Goyang	Team competition
Gold medal – first place	2017 Gangneung	Team competition
Silver medal – second place	2015 Buffalo	Team competition
Silver medal – second place	2019 Ostrava	Team competition

James Gemmell (born April 26, 1980) is a Canadian ice sledge hockey player.

Gemmell was born in 100 Mile House, British Columbia and lists his hometown as Quesnel, British Columbia. In 2004, he had his right leg amputated above the knee after an automobile accident. He began playing sledge hockey in 2006 with the Surrey Eagles.

Gemmell won a gold medal with Team Canada at the 2013 IPC Ice Sledge Hockey World Championships in Goyang, Korea, and a bronze medal at the 2014 Winter Paralympics in Sochi, Russia.
