= Choi Kwang-hyouk =

South Korean sledge hockey player (born 1987)

Personal information
- Born: 15 March 1987 (age 39)
Medal record
Para ice hockey
Representing South Korea
Paralympic Games
| Bronze medal – third place | 2018 PyeongChang | Team competition |
World Championships
| Bronze medal – third place | 2017 Gangneung | Team competition |
| Bronze medal – third place | 2019 Ostrava | Team competition |

Choi Kwang-hyouk (Korean: 최광혁; born 15 March 1987) is a South Korean ice sledge hockey player. He was a member of South Korea's bronze medal winning team in para ice hockey at the 2018 Winter Paralympics.

Choi was born in Myonggan County, North Hamgyong Province, North Korea, where his left leg was crushed in a train accident, and doctors amputated it below the knee. Choi then defected in 2001, fleeing through China with the help of his uncle.
