= Lee Jong-kyung (sledge hockey) =

South Korean sledge hockey player

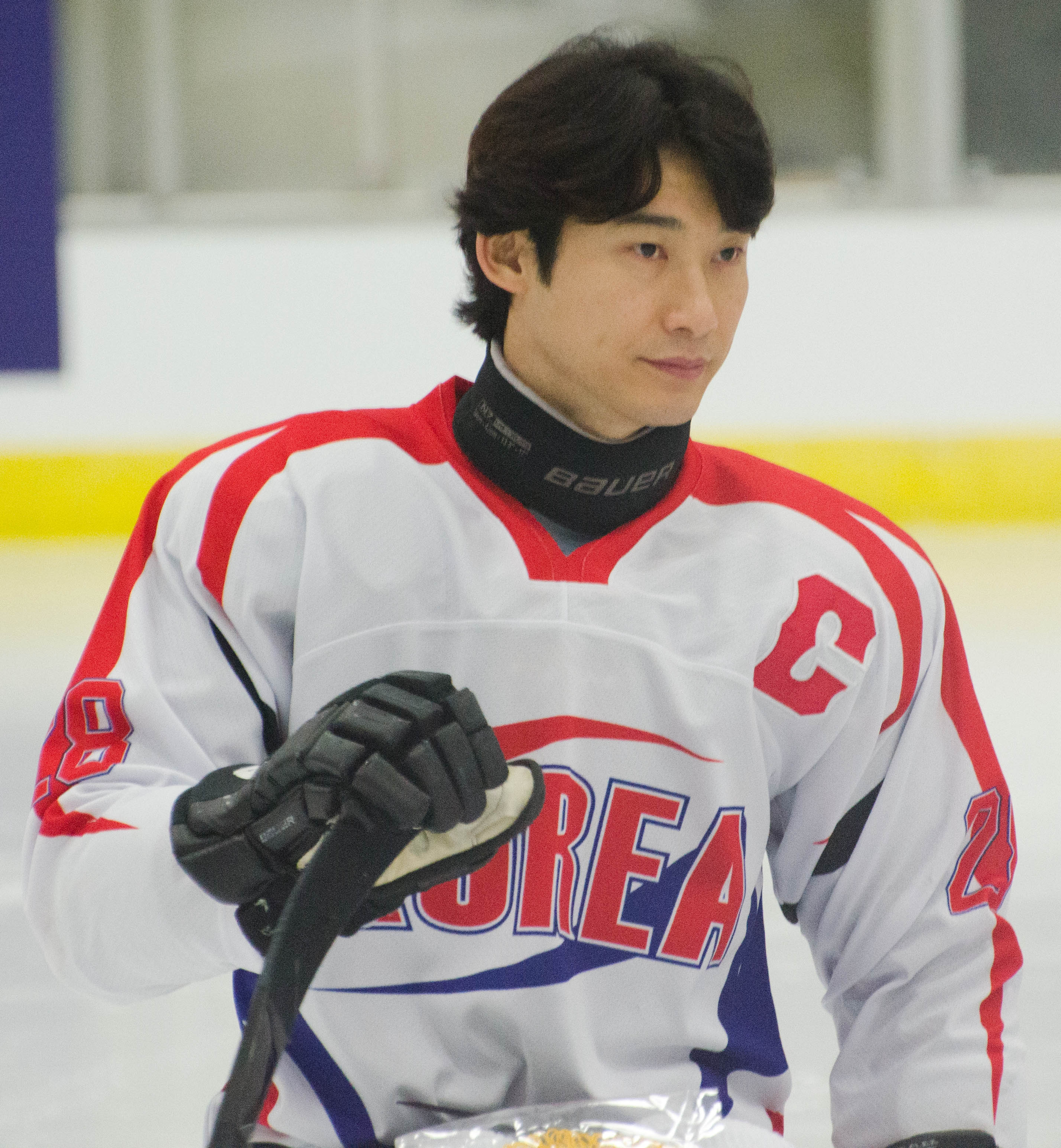
- Lee in 2015
- Born: 28 October 1973 (age 52) South Korea
- Height: 180 cm (5 ft 11 in)
- Playing career: 2005–present
Medal record
Para ice hockey
Representing South Korea
Paralympic Games
Bronze medal – third place	2018 Gangneung	Team competition
World Championships
Silver medal – second place	2012 Hamar	Team competition
Bronze medal – third place	2017 Gangneung	Team competition
Bronze medal – third place	2019 Ostrava	Team competition

Lee Jong-kyung (born 28 October 1973) is a South Korean ice sledge hockey player. He played in the 2010, 2014, 2018 and 2022 Paralympic Winter Games. He won a silver medal at the 2012 IPC Ice Sledge Hockey World Championships, and 3 bronze medals at the 2018 Winter Paralympics and the 2017 and 2019 World Para Ice Hockey Championships. Lee was a member of South Korea's bronze medal winning team in para ice hockey at the 2018 Winter Paralympics.
