= Florian Planker =

Italian para-alpine skier, ice hockey player (born 1977)

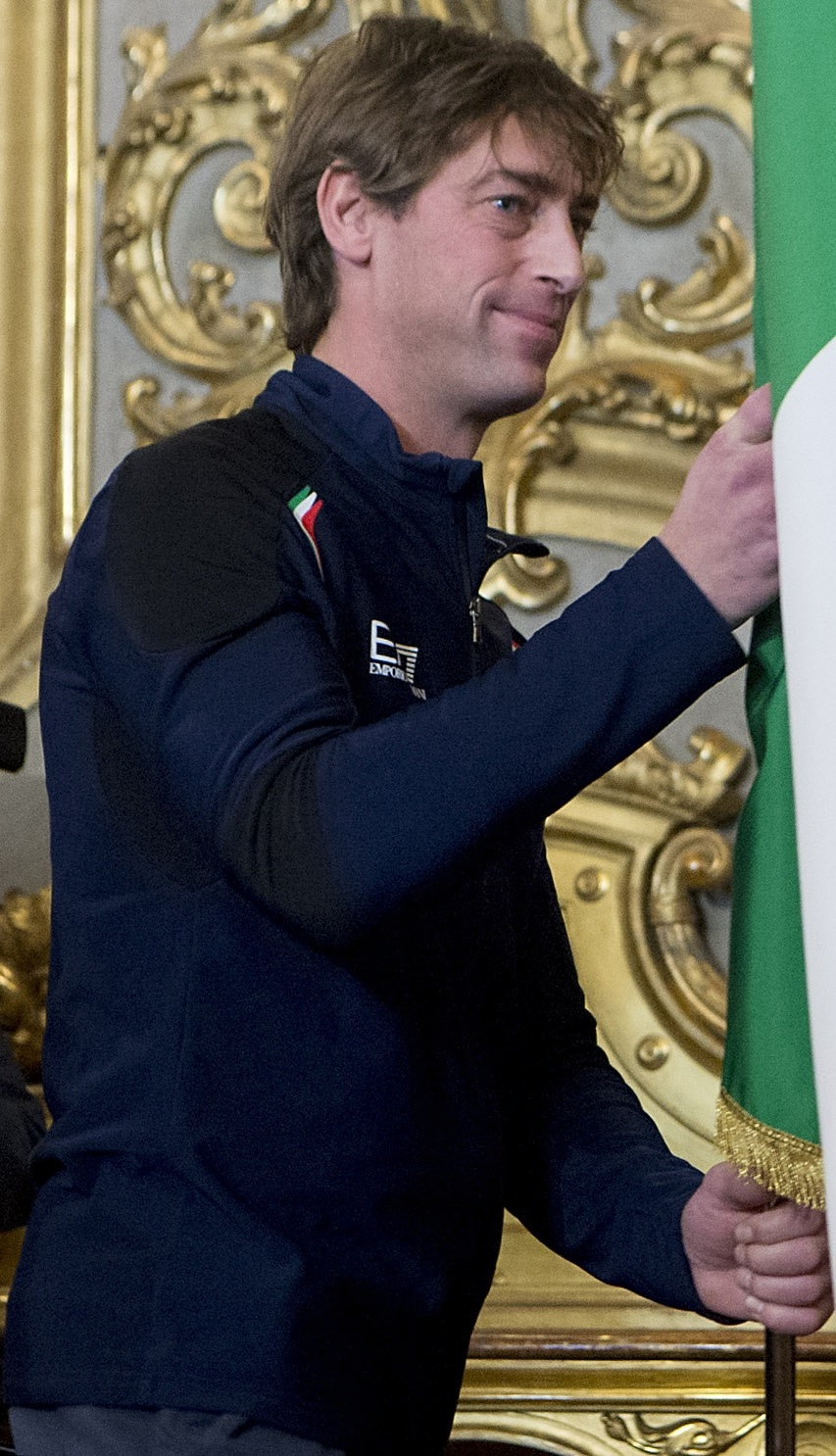
- Planker in 2017

Personal information
- Born: 8 February 1977 (age 49)
Medal record
Representing Italy
Men's para alpine skiing
Paralympic Games
Silver medal – second place	2002 Salt Lake City	Super-G LW2
Men's para ice hockey
European Championships
Gold medal – first place	2011 Sollefteå	Team competition
Silver medal – second place	2016 Östersund	Team competition

Florian Planker (born 8 February 1977) is an Italian former para-alpine skier and current ice sledge hockey player. He is a five time Paralympian who was named a flag-bearer in 2017.
