= Rolf Einar Pedersen =

Norwegian ice sledge hockey player

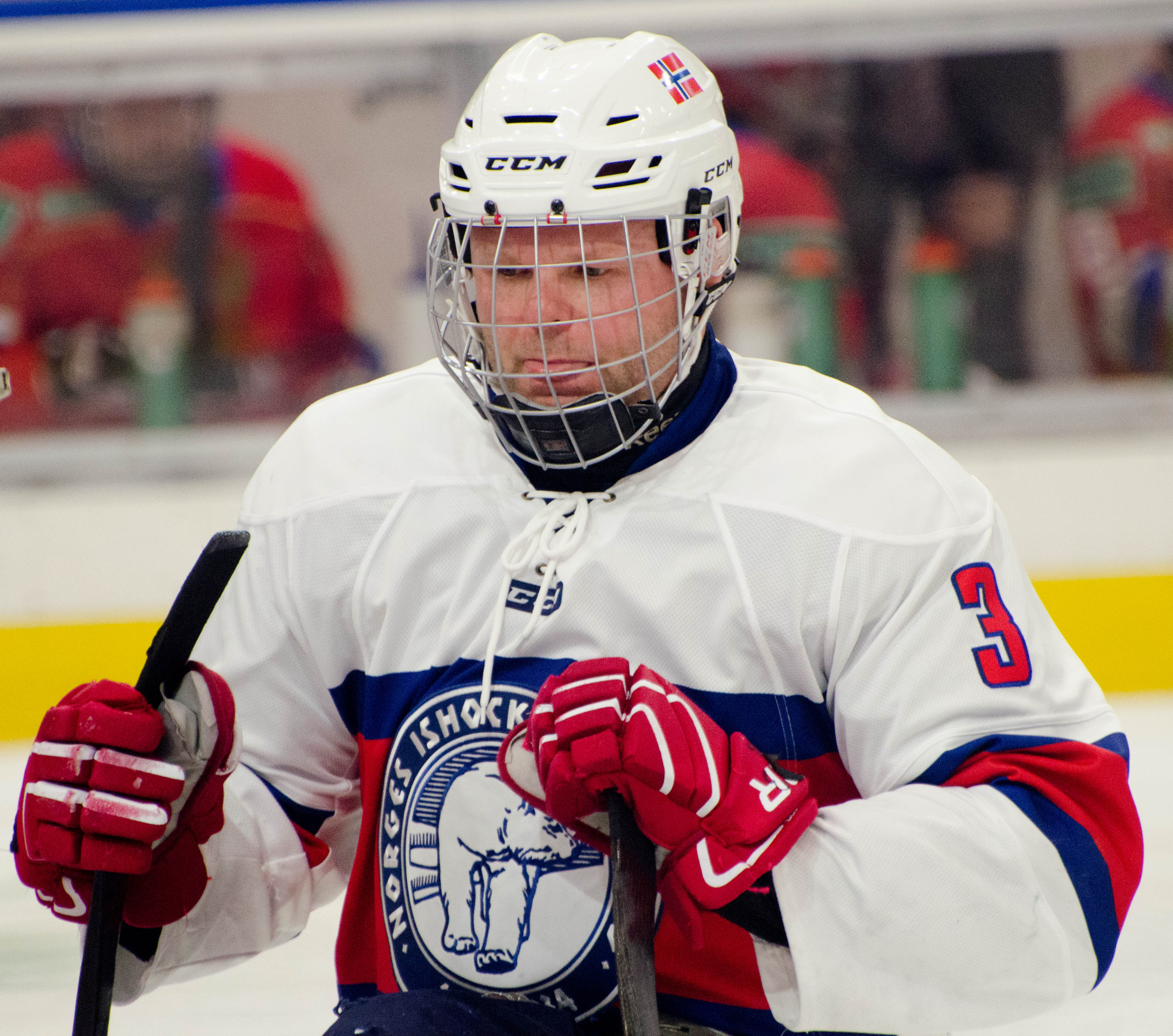
- Pedersen at the 2015 IPC Ice Sledge Hockey World Championships in Buffalo, New York
- Born: 4 November 1969 (age 56) Sandefjord, Norway
- Position: Defence
- Played for: Oslo KHK
- National team: Norway
- Playing career: ?–present
Medal record
Representing Norway
Men's ice sledge hockey
Paralympic Games
Silver medal – second place	2002 Salt Lake City	Team competition
Silver medal – second place	2006 Turin	Team competition
Bronze medal – third place	2010 Vancouver	Team competition
World Championships
Silver medal – second place	2009 Ostrava	Team competition
European Championships
Bronze medal – third place	2011 Sollefteå	Team competition
Men's ice sledge speed racing
Paralympic Games
Silver medal – second place	1988 Innsbruck	100 m grade II
Bronze medal – third place	1988 Innsbruck	500 m grade II
Bronze medal – third place	1988 Innsbruck	1000 m grade II

Rolf Einar Pedersen (born 4 November 1969) is a Norwegian ice sledge hockey player.

As a member of the Norwegian ice sledge hockey team he has one bronze (2010), and two silver (2002, 2006) from the Paralympic Games. Many consider him to be the best ice sledge hockey player in the sport's history.

He has two Paralympic bronze (1988), and one silver (1988) from ice sledge speed racing, and one gold (1992) from cross-country skiing.
