= Morten Værnes =

Norwegian ice sledge hockey player

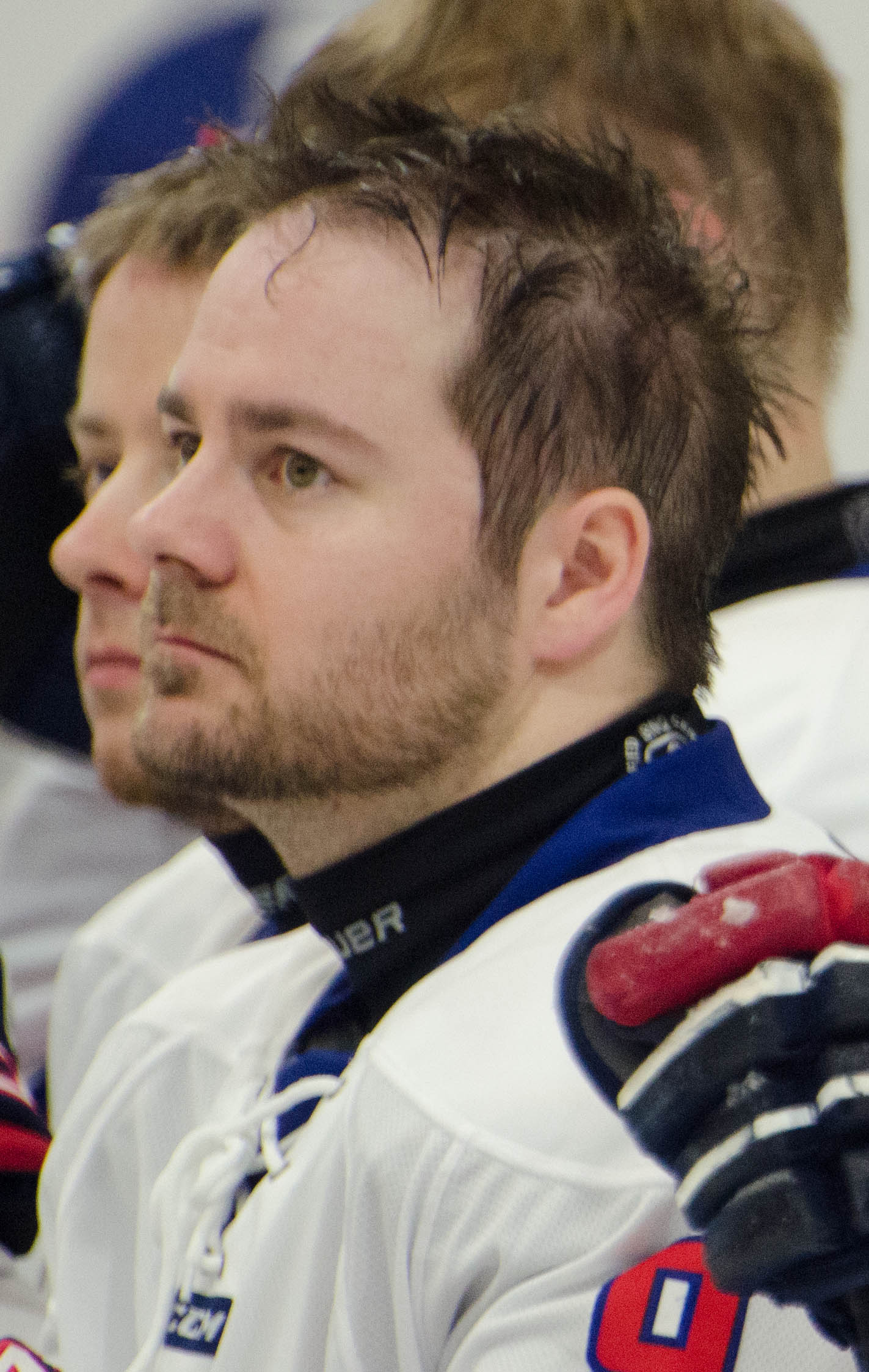
- Værnes at the 2015 IPC Ice Sledge Hockey World Championships in Buffalo, New York
- Born: 6 December 1981 (age 44) Oslo, Norway
- Position: Defense
- National team: Norway
- Playing career: ?–present
Medal record
Men's para ice hockey
Representing Norway
Paralympic Games
Silver medal – second place	2006 Turin	Team
Bronze medal – third place	2010 Vancouver	Team
World Championships
Gold medal – first place	2004 Sweden	Team
Silver medal – second place	2008 United States	Team
Silver medal – second place	2009 Netherlands/ Czech Republic	Team
European Championships
Bronze medal – third place	2011 Sollefteå	Team

Morten Værnes (born 6 December 1981) is a Norwegian ice sledge hockey player and Paralympian.

As a member of the Norwegian ice sledge hockey team he has one bronze (2010), and one silver (2006) from the Paralympic Games.
