= Lee Ju-seung =

South Korean sledge hockey player

Personal information
- Native name: 이주승
- Born: December 13, 1990 (age 35) Seoul, South Korea
- Education: Chungbuk National University
- Height: 1.60 m (5 ft 3 in)

Sport
- Sport: Sledge hockey
- Position: Forward
- Disability: Myelitis (congenital)
Medal record
Para ice hockey
Representing South Korea
Paralympic Games
Bronze medal – third place	2018 PyeongChang	Team competition
World Championships
Bronze medal – third place	2017 Gangneung	Team competition
Bronze medal – third place	2019 Ostrava	Team competition

Lee Ju-seung (Korean: 이주승; RR: I Juseung, born 13 December 1990 in Seoul) is a South Korean sledge hockey player. He was a member of South Korea's bronze medal winning team in para ice hockey at the 2018 Winter Paralympics.

He was born with myelitis.
