= Germany men's national ice sledge hockey team =

Germany
- The Coat of arms of Germany is the badge used on the players jerseys.
- Association: DRS
- Team colors
Home colours	Away colours

Paralympics
- Appearances: 1 (first in 2006)
- Medals: 4th: 1 – 2006

IPC Ice Sledge Hockey World Championships
- Appearances: 3 (first in 2004)
- Best result: 5th: 1 – 2008

The German national ice sledge hockey team is the ice sledge hockey team representing Germany. The team is overseen by the Deutscher Rollstuhl-Sportverband (DRS), and participates in international competitions.

== Tournament record ==
=== Performance in Paralympic Games ===
- 2006 – 4th

=== Performance in World Championship ===
- 2004 – 7th
- 2008 – 5th
- 2009 – 8th
- 2013 – Pool B 1st (promoted)
- 2015 – 6th
- 2017 – 7th (Relegated)
- 2019 – Pool B 4th
- 2021 – Pool B 2nd (promoted)
- 2023 – 8th (Relegated)
- 2024 – Pool B 2nd (promoted)
- 2025 – 5th

=== Performance in European Championship ===
- 2005 – (gold) Gold
- 2007 – (bronze) Bronze
- 2011 – 6th place

== Rosters ==
=== 2006 Paralympics roster ===
The following is the German roster in the men's ice sledge hockey tournament of the 2006 Winter Paralympics.

Robert Lionel Pabst, Rolf Rabe, Sebastian Kessler, Sebstiaan Disveld, Sven Stumpe, Udo Segreff, Raimund Patzelt, Matthias Koch, Alexander Klein, Frank Rennhack, Gerd Bleidorn, Jorg Wedde, Marco Lahrs, Marius Hattendorf

=== 2009 World Championship roster ===
Rolf Rabe, Lars Uhlemann, Matthias Koch, Marco Lars, Robert Pabst, Jörg Wedde, Christoph Appelkamp, Gerd Bleidorn, Sebastien Disveld, Torsten Ellmer, Marc Müller, Christian Pilz, Frank Rennhack, Udo Segreff, Sven Stumpe

== See also ==
- Germany men's national ice hockey team
