= Andrea Chiarotti =

Italian ice hockey player (1966–2018)

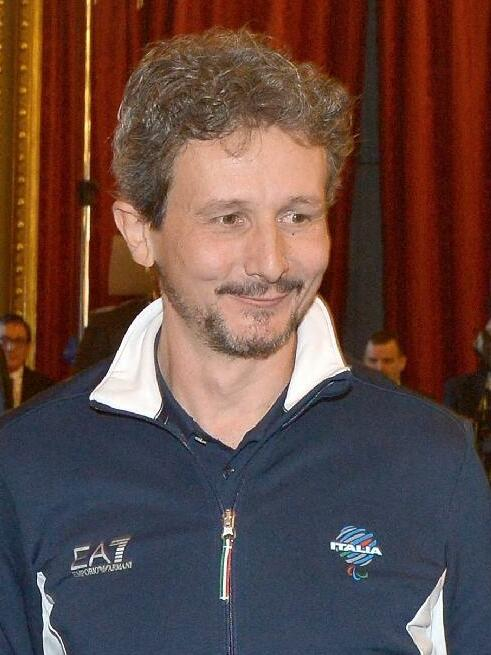

Personal information
- Born: 5 December 1966 Turin
- Died: 8 June 2018 (aged 51) Torre Pellice
Medal record
Representing Italy
Men's para ice hockey
European Championships
Gold medal – first place	2011 Sollefteå	Team competition
Silver medal – second place	2016 Östersund	Team competition

Andrea Ciaz Chiarotti (Turin, 5 December 1966 – Torre Pellice, 8 June 2018) was an Italian ice sledge hockey player and coach. He was a three time Paralympian who was named a flag-bearer in 2014.

== Career ==
=== Ice hockey ===
Before losing his leg in a motorbike accident in 1990, he played ice hockey with Valpellice since 1982. Later, since 1994, he was an ice hockey coach.

=== Ice sledge hockey ===
In 2003, in view of the 2006 Winter Paralympics in Turin, the Italian Paralympic Committee created the Italian national sledge hockey team. Chiarotti was appointed head coach.

However, Chiarotti resigned shortly afterwards, preferring to return to the sport as a player.

Until his retirement in 2017 he was player-assistant coach of the Tori Seduti Piemonte team (with whom he won four Italian championships) and captain of the national team.

With the azzurri, Chiarotti won the gold medal at the European Championships in 2011 and the silver medal five years later. He was also a three time Paralympian: Turin 2006, Vancouver 2010 and Sochi 2014. On this last occasion he was Italy's flag bearer.

After the retirement, he was appointed team leader of the Italian National team that reached fourth place in Pyeongchang 2018.

He died of liver cancer a few months later.

In his honour, the Italian Ice Sports Federation renamed the Para Ice Hockey Coppa Italia as the Andrea Chiarotti Trophy in 2022.
