= Udo Segreff =

German ice sledge hockey player

- Born: July 20, 1973 (age 51)
- Position: Forward
- Playing career: ?–present

Udo Segreff (born July 20, 1973) is a German ice sledge hockey player.

He placed 4th with the German ice sledge hockey team at the 2006 Paralympic Games in Turin, Italy.

He has one gold and one bronze from the European Ice Sledge Hockey Championships.

He has 11 national titles and was 8 times the best scorer.
