= Imre Tiitsu =

Estonian ice sledge hockey player

- Born: June 18, 1980 (age 45) Rakvere, then part of Estonian SSR, Soviet Union
- Position: Defence
- Played for: Tallinn Panter
- National team: Estonia
- Playing career: 2001–2011

Imre Tiitsu (born June 18, 1980) is an Estonian ice sledge hockey player.

He was part of the Estonian sledge hockey team at the 2002 Winter Paralympics in Salt Lake City, United States.

He had an amputation of both legs after an accident.
