= Kaido Kalm =

Estonian ice sledge hockey player

- Born: March 24, 1965 (age 60); Keila, Estonia
- Played for: Tallinn Panter
- National team: Estonia
- Playing career: 1994–present

Kaido Kalm (born March 24, 1965) is an Estonian ice sledge hockey player.

He was part of the Estonian sledge hockey team at the 1998 Winter Paralympics in Nagano (4th place) and at the 2002 Winter Paralympics in Salt Lake City (6th place).
