= World Para Ice Hockey European Championships =

International sporting tournament

- Sport: Ice sledge hockey
- No. of teams: 10
- Continent: Europe
- Most recent champion: Russia (1st title)
- Most titles: Germany (1 title), Norway (1 title), Italy (1 title), Russia (1 title)

The World Para Ice Hockey European Championships (formerly IPC Ice Sledge Hockey European Championships) is the European ice sledge hockey championships. The European Championship is also a qualifying tournament for the IPC Ice Sledge Hockey World Championships and the Paralympic Games.

The first European Championship was held in 2005.

== Summaries ==
Year	Host	(gold) Gold	(silver) Silver	(bronze) Bronze
2005; Details	CZE (Zlín)	Germany	Sweden	Estonia
2007; Details	ITA (Pinerolo)	Norway	Czech Republic	Germany
2011; Details	SWE (Sollefteå)	Italy	Czech Republic	Norway
2016; Details	SWE (Östersund)	Russia	Italy	Norway

== Participation details ==
Team	(Czech Republic); 2005	(Italy); 2007	(Sweden); 2011	(Sweden); 2016	Total
Czech Republic	4th	2nd	2nd	4th	4
Estonia	3rd	5th	4th	-	3
Germany	1st	3rd	6th	6th	4
Great Britain	5th	-	8th	-	2
Italy	6th	6th	1st	2nd	4
Netherlands	-	-	10th	-	1
Norway	-	1st	3rd	3rd	3
Poland	-	7th	9th	-	2
Russia	-	-	7th	1st	2
Sweden	2nd	4th	5th	5th	4

== See also ==
- World Para Ice Hockey Championships
- Ice Hockey European Championships
