= Cross-country skiing at the 2022 Winter Paralympics – Men's 1.5 km sprint =

Men's 1.5 kilometre sprint classical at the XIII Paralympic Winter Games
- Paralympic cross-country skiing
- Dates: 9 March 2022

Men's 1.5 kilometre sprint (visually impaired) at the XIII Paralympic Winter Games

Medalists
1st place, gold medalist(s)		Brian McKeever; Guide: Russel Kennedy	Canada
2nd place, silver medalist(s)		Jake Adicoff; Guide: Sam Wood	United States
3rd place, bronze medalist(s)		Zebastian Modin; Guide: Emil Jönsson Haag	Sweden

Men's 1.5 kilometre sprint (standing) at the XIII Paralympic Winter Games

Medalists
1st place, gold medalist(s)		Benjamin Daviet	France
2nd place, silver medalist(s)		Marco Maier	Germany
3rd place, bronze medalist(s)		Grygorii Vovchynskyi	Ukraine

Men's 1.5 kilometre sprint (sitting) at the XIII Paralympic Winter Games

Medalists
1st place, gold medalist(s)		Zheng Peng	China
2nd place, silver medalist(s)		Mao Zhongwu	China
3rd place, bronze medalist(s)		Collin Cameron	Canada

The Men's 1.5 kilometre sprint competition of the 2022 Winter Paralympics was held at the National Biathlon Center in Beijing on 9 March 2022.

== Medal table ==
Rank	Nation	Gold	Silver	Bronze	Total
1	China (CHN)*	1	1	0	2
2	Canada (CAN)	1	0	1	2
3	France (FRA)	1	0	0	1
4	Germany (GER)	0	1	0	1
4	United States (USA)	0	1	0	1
6	Sweden (SWE)	0	0	1	1
6	Ukraine (UKR)	0	0	1	1
Totals (7 entries)		3	3	3	9

== 1.5 km sprint visually impaired ==
In the cross-country skiing visually impaired, the athlete with a visual impairment has a sighted guide. The two skiers are considered a team, and dual medals are awarded.

=== Qualification ===
Rank	Bib	Name	Country	Time	Difference	Notes
1	113	Jake Adicoff; Guide: Sam Wood	United States	2:36.72	–	Q
2	111	Brian McKeever; Guide: Russel Kennedy	Canada	2:37.34	+0.62	Q
3	115	Anthony Chalençon; Guide: Brice Ottonello	France	2:38.79	+2.07	Q
4	112	Zebastian Modin; Guide: Emil Jönsson Haag	Sweden	2:40.35	+3.63	Q
5	117	Anatolii Kovalevskyi; Guide: Oleksandr Mukshyn	Ukraine	2:44.95	+8.23	Q
6	116	Dmytro Suiarko; Guide: Oleksandr Nikonovych	Ukraine	2:47.38	+10.66	Q
7	118	Piotr Garbowski; Guide: Jakub Twardowski	Poland	2:48.55	+11.83	Q
8	122	Yu Shuang; Guide: Wang Guanyu	China	2:49.24	+12.52	Q
9	114	Nico Messinger; Guide: Robin Wunderle	Germany	2:49.59	+12.87	
10	120	Iaroslav Reshetynskyi; Guide: K. Yaremenko	Ukraine	2:50.41	+13.69	
11	123	Xu He; Guide: Diao C.	China	2:51.01	+14.29	
12	121	Thomas Oxaal; Guide: Ole-Martin Lid	Norway	2:51.57	+14.85	
13	119	Inkki Inola; Guide: Jari Huhta	Finland	2:55.47	+18.75	
14	124	Max Nelson; Guide: S. Hamilton	United States	3:00.26	+23.54	
15	126	Paweł Gil; Guide: M. Landa	Poland	3:11.03	+34.31	
16	127	Ryohei Ariyasu; Guide: Y. Fujita	Japan	3:34.72	+58.00	
	125	Pawel Nowicki; Guide: J. Kobryn	Poland	DNF		

=== Semifinal 1 ===
Rank	Bib	Name	Country	Time	Difference	Notes
1	121	Jake Adicoff; Guide: Sam Wood	United States	3:44.4	–	Q
2	124	Zebastian Modin; Guide: Emil Jönsson Haag	Sweden	3:47.3	+2.9	Q
3	125	Anatolii Kovalevskyi; Guide: Oleksandr Mukshyn	Ukraine	3:57.1	+12.7	
4	128	Yu Shuang; Guide: Wang Guanyu	China	4:07.5	+23.1	

=== Semifinal 2 ===
Rank	Bib	Name	Country	Time	Difference	Notes
1	123	Anthony Chalençon; Guide: Brice Ottonello	France	3:34.9	–	Q
2	122	Brian McKeever; Guide: Russel Kennedy	Canada	3:36.4	+1.5	Q
3	126	Dmytro Suiarko; Guide: Oleksandr Nikonovych	Ukraine	3:49.4	+14.5	
4	127	Piotr Garbowski; Guide: Jakub Twardowski	Poland	4:01.4	+26.5	

=== Finals ===
Rank	Bib	Name	Country	Time	Difference
1st place, gold medalist(s)	122	Brian McKeever; Guide: Russel Kennedy	Canada	3:19.5	–
2nd place, silver medalist(s)	121	Jake Adicoff; Guide: Sam Wood	United States	3:20.3	+0.8
3rd place, bronze medalist(s)	124	Zebastian Modin; Guide: Emil Jönsson Haag	Sweden	3:37.8	+18.3
4	123	Anthony Chalençon; Guide: Brice Ottonello	France	3:47.2	+27.7

== 1.5 km sprint standing ==
=== Qualification ===
Rank	Bib	Name	Country	Time	Difference	
1	63	Marco Maier	Germany	2:43.67	–	Q
2	61	Benjamin Daviet	France	2:44.59	+0.92	Q
3	65	Grygorii Vovchynskyi	Ukraine	2:46.90	+3.23	Q
4	78	Cai Jiayun	China	2:47.26	+3.59	Q
5	74	Liu Xiaobin	China	2:49.10	+5.43	Q
6	64	Taiki Kawayoke	Japan	2:49.95	+6.28	Q
7	77	Wang Chenyang	China	2:50.44	+6.77	Q
8	72	Alexandr Gerlits	Kazakhstan	2:50.45	+6.78	Q
9	68	Ruslan Reiter	United States	2:54.49	+10.82	Q
10	79	Kjartan Haugen	Norway	2:54.51	+10.84	Q
11	66	Alexander Ehler	Germany	2:56.15	+12.48	Q
12	67	Yoshihiro Nitta	Japan	2:56.69	+13.02	Q
13	83	Wu Junbao	China	2:57.45	+13.78	
14	81	Wu Gaoqun	China	2:57.89	+14.22	
15	80	Serafym Drahun	Ukraine	3:00.13	+16.46	
16	69	Luca Tavasci	Switzerland	3:00.73	+17.06	
17	62	Witold Skupien	Poland	3:00.98	+17.31	
18	73	Batmönkhiin Ganbold	Mongolia	3:05.39	+21.72	
19	71	Dashdorj Tsegmid	Mongolia	3:07.32	+23.65	
20	70	Qiu Mingyang	China	3:07.43	+23.76	
21	82	Drew Shea	United States	3:12.76	+29.09	
22	76	Keigo Iwamoto	Japan	3:14.45	+30.78	
23	85	Abdoulfazi Khatibi Mianaei	Iran	3:19.71	+36.04	
24	75	Cristian Toninelli	Italy	3:20.99	+37.32	
25	84	Pol Makuri Redolad Garcia	Spain	4:17.32	+1:33.65	

=== Semifinal 1 ===
Rank	Bib	Name	Country	Time	Difference	Notes
1	28	Cai Jiayun	China	3:18.4	–	Q
2	32	Alexandr Gerlits	Kazakhstan	3:26.3	+7.9	Q
3	25	Marco Maier	Germany	3:26.4	+8.0	Q
4	36	Yoshihiro Nitta	Japan	3:32.7	+14.3	
5	29	Liu Xiaobin	China	3:40.7	+22.3	
6	33	Ruslan Reiter	United States	3:43.1	+24.7	

=== Semifinal 2 ===
Rank	Bib	Name	Country	Time	Difference	Notes
1	26	Benjamin Daviet	France	3:25.5	–	Q
2	27	Grygorii Vovchynskyi	Ukraine	3:25.5	+0.0	Q
3	34	Kjartan Haugen	Norway	3:27.2	+1.7	Q
4	30	Taiki Kawayoke	Japan	3:30.1	+4.6	
5	35	Alexander Ehler	Germany	3:38.7	+13.2	
6	31	Wang Chenyang	China	3:40.0	+14.5	

=== Finals ===
Rank	Bib	Name	Country	Time	Difference
1st place, gold medalist(s)	26	Benjamin Daviet	France	3:07.5	–
2nd place, silver medalist(s)	25	Marco Maier	Germany	3:08.8	+1.3
3rd place, bronze medalist(s)	27	Grygorii Vovchynskyi	Ukraine	3:09.3	+1.8
4	28	Cai Jiayun	China	3:12.2	+4.7
5	32	Alexandr Gerlits	Kazakhstan	3:13.0	+5.5
6	34	Kjartan Haugen	Norway	3:28.8	+21.3

== 1.5 km sprint sitting ==
=== Qualification ===
Rank	Bib	Name	Country	Time	Difference	Notes
1	19	Zheng Peng	China	2:14.17	–	Q
2	5	Collin Cameron	Canada	2:15.51	+1.34	Q
3	13	Mao Zhongwu	China	2:20.03	+5.86	Q
4	18	Liu Zixu	China	2:23.38	+9.21	Q
5	3	Cristian Ribera	Brazil	2:23.48	+9.31	Q
6	21	Wang Tao	China	2:23.55	+9.38	Q
7	4	Pavlo Bal	Ukraine	2:23.60	+9.43	Q
8	1	Giuseppe Romele	Italy	2:24.46	+10.29	Q
9	2	Taras Rad	Ukraine	2:24.84	+10.67	Q
10	24	Zhu Yunfeng	China	2:24.98	+10.81	Q
11	11	Derek Zaplotinsky	Canada	2:25.97	+11.80	Q
12	9	Aaron Pike	United States	2:27.00	+12.83	Q
13	7	Daniel Cnossen	United States	2:27.26	+13.09	
14	8	Eui Hyun Shin	South Korea	2:28.60	+14.43	
15	12	Yerbol Khamitov	Kazakhstan	2:28.67	+14.50	
16	25	Du Tian	China	2:30.42	+16.25	
17	6	Vasyl Kravchuk	Ukraine	2:30.68	+16.51	
18	15	Guilherme Rocha	Brazil	2:34.19	+20.02	
19	31	Josh Sweeney	United States	2:34.22	+20.05	
20	10	Maksym Yarovyi	Ukraine	2:34.71	+20.54	
21	20	Robelson Lula	Brazil	2:36.77	+22.60	
22	16	Callum Deboys	Great Britain	2:37.00	+22.83	
23	17	Krzysztof Plewa	Poland	2:37.42	+23.25	
24	23	Wesley Vinicius dos Santos	Brazil	2:39.14	+24.97	
25	22	Steve Thomas	Great Britain	2:39.33	+25.16	
26	26	Ethan Hess	Canada	2:43.50	+29.33	
27	32	Nicolas Lima	Argentina	2:47.78	+33.61	
28	30	Yoomin Won	South Korea	2:48.51	+34.34	
29	33	Michele Biglione	Italy	2:48.54	+34.37	
30	34	Yuriy Berezin	Kazakhstan	2:48.56	+34.39	
31	28	Hiroaki Mori	Japan	2:49.22	+35.05	
32	27	Denis Petrenko	Kazakhstan	2:53.97	+39.80	
33	35	Jaeseok Jeong	South Korea	2:55.85	+41.68	
34	29	Sergey Ussoltsev	Kazakhstan	2:56.76	+42.59	
35	36	Temuri Dadiani	Georgia	3:04.97	+50.80	
36	37	Josip Zima	Croatia	3:20.88	+1:06.71	
	14	Steve Arnold	Great Britain	DNS		
	38	Mehman Ramazanzade	Azerbaijan	DNS		

=== Semifinal 1 ===
Rank	Bib	Name	Country	Time	Difference	Notes
1	1	Zheng Peng	China	2:49.5	–	Q
2	4	Liu Zixu	China	2:55.2	+5.7	Q
3	9	Taras Rad	Ukraine	2:55.8	+6.3	Q
4	8	Giuseppe Romele	Italy	2:57.6	+8.1	
5	5	Cristian Ribera	Brazil	2:59.8	+10.3	
6	12	Aaron Pike	United States	3:01.3	+12.8	

=== Semifinal 2 ===
Rank	Bib	Name	Country	Time	Difference	Notes
1	2	Collin Cameron	Canada	2:49.9	–	Q
2	3	Mao Zhongwu	China	2:53.4	+4.2	Q
3	6	Wang Tao	China	2:54.8	+5.6	Q
4	10	Zhu Yunfeng	China	2:55.2	+5.7	
5	7	Pavlo Bal	Ukraine	3:10.9	+21.7	
6	11	Derek Zaplotinsky	Canada	3:15.7	+26.5	

=== Finals ===
Rank	Bib	Name	Country	Time	Difference
1st place, gold medalist(s)	1	Zheng Peng	China	2:42.4	–
2nd place, silver medalist(s)	3	Mao Zhongwu	China	2:44.9	+2.5
3rd place, bronze medalist(s)	2	Collin Cameron	Canada	2:46.3	+3.9
4	4	Liu Zixu	China	2:55.0	+13.0
5	6	Wang Tao	China	2:57.5	+15.1
6	9	Taras Rad	Ukraine	3:03.6	+21.2

== See also ==
- Cross-country skiing at the 2022 Winter Olympics
