= Biathlon at the 2022 Winter Paralympics – Men's 10 kilometres =

Men's 10 kilometres at the XIII Paralympic Winter Games
- Paralympic biathlon
- Dates: 8 March

Men's 10 kilometres (visually impaired) at the XIII Paralympic Winter Games
- Competitors: 10 from 5 nations

Medalists
1st place, gold medalist(s)		Vitaliy Lukyanenko; Guide: Borys Babar	Ukraine
2nd place, silver medalist(s)		Anatolii Kovalevskyi; Guide: Oleksandr Mukshyn	Ukraine
3rd place, bronze medalist(s)		Dmytro Suiarko; Guide: Oleksandr Nikonovych	Ukraine

Men's 10 kilometres (standing) at the XIII Paralympic Winter Games
- Competitors: 13 from 8 nations

Medalists
1st place, gold medalist(s)		Mark Arendz	Canada
2nd place, silver medalist(s)		Grygorii Vovchynskyi	Ukraine
3rd place, bronze medalist(s)		Alexandr Gerlits	Kazakhstan

Men's 10 kilometres (sitting) at the XIII Paralympic Winter Games
- Competitors: 19 from 8 nations

Medalists
1st place, gold medalist(s)		Liu Mengtao	China
2nd place, silver medalist(s)		Martin Fleig	Germany
3rd place, bronze medalist(s)		Taras Rad	Ukraine

The Men's 10 kilometres competition of the 2022 Winter Paralympics took place on 8 March 2022.

== Medal table ==
Rank	Nation	Gold	Silver	Bronze	Total
1	Ukraine (UKR)	1	2	2	5
2	Canada (CAN)	1	0	0	1
2	China (CHN)*	1	0	0	1
4	Germany (GER)	0	1	0	1
5	Kazakhstan (KAZ)	0	0	1	1
Totals (5 entries)		3	3	3	9

== Visually impaired ==
In the biathlon visually impaired, the athlete with a visual impairment has a sighted guide. The two skiers are considered a team, and dual medals are awarded.

Rank	Bib	Name	Country	Penalties	Time	Difference
1st place, gold medalist(s)	97	Vitaliy Lukyanenko; Guide: Borys Babar	Ukraine	0	34:12.7	–
2nd place, silver medalist(s)	100	Anatolii Kovalevskyi; Guide: Oleksandr Mukshyn	Ukraine	1	34:57.3	+44.6
3rd place, bronze medalist(s)	96	Dmytro Suiarko; Guide: Oleksandr Nikonovych	Ukraine	2	35:30.9	+1:18.2
4	99	Iaroslav Reshetynskyi; Guide: K. Yaremenko	Ukraine	0	35:47.8	+1:35.1
5	98	Oleksandr Kazik; Guide: Serhii Kucheriavyi	Ukraine	5	37:00.2	+2:47.5
6	95	Yu Shuang; Guide: Wang Guanyu	China	4	37:00.9	+2:48.2
7	04	Nico Messinger; Guide: Robin Wunderle	Germany	3	39:27.1	+5:14.4
8	91	Dang Hesong; Guide: Qin H.	China	11	43:04.2	+8:51.5
9	93	Anthony Chalençon; Guide: Brice Ottonello	France	12	43:13.4	+9:00.7
10	92	Paweł Gil; Guide: M. Landa	Poland	3	45:43.8	+11:31.1

== Standing ==
Rank	Bib	Name	Country	Penalties	Time	Difference
1st place, gold medalist(s)	71	Mark Arendz	Canada	0	31:45.2	–
2nd place, silver medalist(s)	72	Grygorii Vovchynskyi	Ukraine	1	32:18.0	+32.8
3rd place, bronze medalist(s)	69	Alexandr Gerlits	Kazakhstan	3	33:06.5	+1:21.3
4	65	Wu Junbao	China	2	33:29.3	+1:44.1
5	68	Wu Gaoqun	China	6	34:11.8	+2:26.6
6	73	Benjamin Daviet	France	4	34:15.1	+2:29.9
7	61	Liu Xiaobin	China	3	34:26.6	+2:41.4
8	63	Yuan Mingshou	China	1	34:36.9	+2:51.7
9	67	Keiichi Sato	Japan	1	34:49.2	+3:04.0
10	70	Nils-Erik Ulset	Norway	1	35:15.3	+3:30.1
11	64	Li Taiyun	China	5	37:30.0	+5:44.8
12	66	Ruslan Reiter	United States	3	38:06.7	+6:21.5
13	62	Drew Shea	United States	1	39:12.5	+7:27.3

== Sitting ==
Rank	Bib	Name	Country	Penalties	Time	Difference
1st place, gold medalist(s)	32	Liu Mengtao	China	3	30:37.7	–
2nd place, silver medalist(s)	35	Martin Fleig	Germany	2	31:23.7	+46.0
3rd place, bronze medalist(s)	39	Taras Rad	Ukraine	4	31:26.9	+49.2
4	38	Vasyl Kravchuk	Ukraine	5	32:12.1	+1:33.4
5	36	Liu Zixu	China	5	32:30.2	+1:52.8
6	31	Pavlo Bal	Ukraine	3	32:31.7	+1:54.0
7	28	Wang Tao	China	3	32:34.0	+1:56.3
8	27	Derek Zaplotinsky	Canada	3	32:56.4	+2:18.7
9	30	Scott Meenagh	Great Britain	4	33:11.7	+2:34.0
10	23	Zhu Yunfeng	China	4	34:02.3	+3:24.6
11	34	Sin Eui-hyun	South Korea	6	34:05.7	+3:28.0
12	33	Daniel Cnossen	United States	4	34:10.0	+3:32.3
13	29	Oleksandr Aleksyk	Ukraine	3	34:29.1	+3:51.4
14	21	Sergey Ussoltsev	Kazakhstan	6	35:53.1	+5:15.4
15	37	Aaron Pike	United States	6	36:49.4	+6:11.7
16	25	Yerbol Khamitov	Kazakhstan	4	37:49.8(Pen+2:00)	+7:12.1
17	22	Won Yoo-min	South Korea	0	38:21.8	+7:44.1
18	24	Callum Deboys	Great Britain	8	38:37.9	+8:00.2
-	26	Maksym Varovyi	Ukraine	DNF		

== See also ==
- Biathlon at the 2022 Winter Olympics
