= 2023 World Para Nordic Skiing Championships =

International para skiing competition

- Venue: Östersund Ski Stadium
- Location: Östersund, Sweden
- Dates: 21–29 January 2023

The 2023 World Para Nordic Skiing Championships was held from 21 to 29 January 2023 in Östersund, Sweden. Originally scheduled to take place in the Swedish region of Jämtland and include nordic, alpine and snowboard competitions following the successful inaugural edition of the 2021 Combined Snow Sports World Championships in Lillehammer.

== Schedule ==
Date	Event
21 January	Biathlon 7.5 km Sprint
22 January	Cross-Country Skiing 18 km Individual Start Classic
24 January	Cross-Country Skiing Sprint free
25 January	Biathlon 10 km Individual Start (penalty loop)
27 January	Biathlon 12.5 km Individual Start (penalty time)
28 January	Cross-Country Skiing 10 km Individual Start Free
29 January	Cross- Country Skiing Mixed & Open Relay 4 x 2.5km

== Medalists ==
=== Para Biathlon ===
Event	Class	Gold	Silver	Bronze
Men´s 7.5km Sprint	Sitting	Collin Cameron (CAN)	Aaron Pike (USA)	Yerbol Khamitov (KAZ)
Men´s 7.5km Sprint	Standing	Marco Maier (GER)	Mark Arendz (CAN)	Serhii Romaniuk (UKR)
Men´s 7.5km Sprint	Visually impaired	Oleksandr Kazik (UKR)	Zebastian Modin (SWE)	Nico Messinger (GER)
Men´s 10km Middle	Sitting	Taras Rad (UKR)	Aaron Pike (USA)	Sin Eui-hyun (KOR)
Men´s 10km Middle	Standing	Mark Arendz (CAN)	Grygorii Vovchynskyi (UKR)	Serhii Romaniuk (UKR)
Men´s 10km Middle	Visually impaired	Oleksandr Kazik (UKR)	Nico Messinger (GER)	Zebastian Modin (SWE)
Men´s 12.5km Individual	Sitting	Aaron Pike (USA)	Scott Meenagh (GBR)	Yerbol Khamitov (KAZ)
Men´s 12.5km Individual	Standing	Mark Arendz (CAN)	Grygorii Vovchynskyi (UKR)	Benjamin Daviet (FRA)
Men´s 12.5km Individual	Visually impaired	Oleksandr Kazik (UKR)	Anthony Chalençon (FRA)	Maksym Murashkovskyi (UKR)
Women´s 7.5km Sprint	Sitting	Kendall Gretsch (USA)	Anja Wicker (GER)	Andrea Eskau (GER)
Women´s 7.5km Sprint	Standing	Natalie Wilkie (CAN)	Brittany Hudak (CAN)	Bohdana Konashuk (UKR)
Women´s 7.5km Sprint	Visually impaired	Leonie Maria Walter (GER)	Linn Kazmaier (GER)	Johanna Recktenwald (GER)
Women´s 10km Middle	Sitting	Kendall Gretsch (USA)	Anja Wicker (GER)	Andrea Eskau (GER)
Women´s 10km Middle	Standing	Liudmyla Liashenko (UKR)	Bohdana Konashuk (UKR)	Brittany Hudak (CAN)
Women´s 10km Middle	Visually impaired	Leonie Maria Walter (GER)	Oksana Shyshkova (UKR)	Carina Edlinger (AUT)
Women´s 12.5km Individual	Sitting	Kendall Gretsch (USA)	Andrea Eskau (GER)	Christina Picton (CAN)
Women´s 12.5km Individual	Standing	Natalie Wilkie (CAN)	Bohdana Konashuk (UKR)	Liudmyla Liashenko (UKR)
Women´s 12.5km Individual	Visually impaired	Linn Kazmaier (GER)	Johanna Recktenwald (GER)	Leonie Maria Walter (GER)

=== Para Cross-Country ===
Event	Class	Gold	Silver	Bronze
Men´s 18km Individual - Classic	Sitting	Giuseppe Romele (ITA)	Collin Cameron (CAN)	Pavlo Bal (UKR)
Men´s 18km Individual - Classic	Standing	Witold Skupień (POL)	Taiki Kawayoke (JPN)	Grygorii Vovchynskyi (UKR)
Men´s 18km Individual - Classic	Visually impaired	Zebastian Modin (SWE)	Jake Adicoff (USA)	Thomas Oxaal (NOR)
Men´s Sprint - Free Style	Sitting	Yerbol Khamitov (KAZ)	Taras Rad (UKR)	Cristian Ribera (BRA)
Men´s Sprint - Free Style	Standing	Marco Maier (GER)	Grygorii Vovchynskyi (UKR)	Nazar Shevchyk (UKR)
Men´s Sprint - Free Style	Visually impaired	Jake Adicoff (USA)	Nico Messinger (GER)	Oleksandr Kazik (UKR)
Men´s 10km - Free Style	Sitting	Giuseppe Romele (ITA)	Collin Cameron (CAN)	Taras Rad (UKR)
Men´s 10km - Free Style	Standing	Mark Arendz (CAN)	Witold Skupień (POL)	Benjamin Daviet (FRA)
Men´s 10km - Free Style	Visually impaired	Zebastian Modin (SWE)	Jake Adicoff (USA)	Oleksandr Kazik (UKR)
Women´s 18km Individual - Classic	Sitting	Kendall Gretsch (USA)	Anja Wicker (GER)	Aline Rocha (BRA)
Women´s 18km Individual - Classic	Standing	Vilde Nilsen (NOR)	Natalie Wilkie (CAN)	Brittany Hudak (CAN)
Women´s 18km Individual - Classic	Visually impaired	Linn Kazmaier (GER)	Leonie Maria Walter (GER)	Oksana Shyshkova (UKR)
Women´s Sprint - Free Style	Sitting	Aline Rocha (BRA)	Kendall Gretsch (USA)	Anja Wicker (GER)
Women´s Sprint - Free Style	Standing	Natalie Wilkie (CAN)	Vilde Nilsen (NOR)	Sydney Peterson (USA)
Women´s Sprint - Free Style	Visually impaired	Carina Edlinger (AUT)	Linn Kazmaier (GER)	Johanna Recktenwald (GER)
Women´s 10km - Free Style	Sitting	Kendall Gretsch (USA)	Anja Wicker (GER)	Aline Rocha (BRA)
Women´s 10km - Free Style	Standing	Vilde Nilsen (NOR)	Natalie Wilkie (CAN)	Sydney Peterson (USA)
Women´s 10km - Free Style	Visually impaired	Linn Kazmaier (GER)	Leonie Maria Walter (GER)	Carina Edlinger (AUT)
Open 4×2.5km Relay Relay Classic/Free Style		Germany; Sebastian Marburger; Linn Kazmaier; Nico Messinger; Marco Maier	Norway; Kjartan Haugen; Vilde Nilsen; Trygve Steinar Larsen; Thomas Oxaal	Ukraine; Dmytro Suiarko; Grygorii Vovchynskyi; Vasyl Kravchuk; Iaroslav Reshetynskyi
Mixed 4×2.5km Relay Relay Classic/Free Style		United States; Aaron Pike; Danielle Aravich; Kendall Gretsch; Jake Adicoff	Ukraine; Pavlo Bal; Bohdana Konashuk; Taras Rad; Liudmyla Liashenko	Germany; Anja Wicker; Steffen Lehmker; Alexander Ehler; Leonie Maria Walter

== Medal table ==
* Host nation (Sweden)

Rank	Nation	Gold	Silver	Bronze	Total
1	Germany (GER)	8	12	8	28
2	United States (USA)	8	5	2	15
3	Canada (CAN)	7	6	3	16
4	Ukraine (UKR)	5	8	13	26
5	Norway (NOR)	2	2	1	5
6	Sweden (SWE)*	2	1	1	4
7	Italy (ITA)	2	0	0	2
8	Poland (POL)	1	1	0	2
9	Brazil (BRA)	1	0	3	4
10	Austria (AUT)	1	0	2	3
10	Kazakhstan (KAZ)	1	0	2	3
12	France (FRA)	0	1	2	3
13	Great Britain (GBR)	0	1	0	1
13	Japan (JPN)	0	1	0	1
15	South Korea (KOR)	0	0	1	1
Totals (15 entries)		38	38	38	114
