= Cross-country skiing at the 2018 Winter Paralympics – 4 × 2.5 kilometre open relay =

Open relay at the XII Paralympic Winter Games
- Paralympic cross-country skiing
- Venue: Alpensia Biathlon Centre, South Korea
- Dates: 18 March 2018
- Competitors: 38 from 12 nations
- Teams: 12
- Winning time: 22:46.6

Medalists
1st place, gold medalist(s)		Benjamin Daviet; Anthony Chalençon; Guide: Simon Valverde; Thomas Clarion; Guide: Antoine Bollet	France
2nd place, silver medalist(s)		Nils-Erik Ulset; Håkon Olsrud; Eirik Bye; Guide: Arvid Nelson	Norway
3rd place, bronze medalist(s)		Collin Cameron; Brian McKeever; Guide: Graham Nishikawa; Guide: Russell Kennedy	Canada

The 4 × 2.5 kilometre mixed relay competition of the 2018 Winter Paralympics was held at the Alpensia Biathlon Centre in Pyeongchang. The competition took place on 18 March 2018.

== Results ==
Rank	Bib	Country	Time	Deficit
1st place, gold medalist(s)	3	France; Benjamin Daviet; Anthony Chalençon; Guide: Simon Valverde; Benjamin Daviet; Thomas Clarion; Guide: Antoine Bollet	22:46.6; 5:22.5; 5:37.1 6:01.8; 5:45.2	
2nd place, silver medalist(s)	8	Norway; Nils-Erik Ulset; Håkon Olsrud; Nils-Erik Ulset; Eirik Bye; Guide: Arvid Nelson	23:09.1; 5:53.2; 5:15.1; 6:42.3; 5:18.5	+22.5
3rd place, bronze medalist(s)	10	Canada; Collin Cameron; Brian McKeever; Guide: Graham Nishikawa; Collin Cameron; Brian McKeever; Guide: Russell Kennedy	23:52.4; 6:31.2; 4:41.2 7:43.3; 4:56.7	+1:05.8
4	6	Belarus; Yury Holub; Guide: Dzmitry Budzilovich; Mikita Ladzesau; Guide: Aliaksei Lukyanau; Lidziya Hrafeyeva; Yury Holub; Guide: Dzmitry Budzilovich	24:10.3; 5:21.1 5:25.2 8:02.4; 5:21.6	+1:23.7
5	2	Ukraine; Iaroslav Reshetynskyi; Guide: Nazar Stefurak; Olha Prylutska; Guide: Borys Babar; Grygorii Vovchynskyi; Anatolii Kovalevskyi; Guide: Oleksandr Mukshyn	24:12.9; 5:40.4 6:19.3 6:31.2; 5:42.0	+1:26.3
6	11	Kazakhstan; Denis Petrenko; Alexandr Gerlits; Alexandr Kolyadin; Alexandr Gerlits	24:21.2; 7:05.0; 5:31.0; 6:11.5; 5:33.7	+1:34.6
7	9	Germany; Martin Fleig; Nico Messinger; Guide: Lutz Peter Klausmann; Martin Fleig; Nico Messinger; Guide: Lutz Peter Klausmann	24:53.5; 6:34.0; 5:18.2 7:22.8; 5:38.5	+2:06.9
8	4	South Korea; Sin Eui-hyun; Kwon Sang-hyeon; Lee Jeong-min; Kwon Sang-hyeon	24:55.7; 6:10.8; 5:46.7; 7:05.6; 5:52.6	+2:09.1
9	1	Poland; Piotr Garbowski; Guide: Jakub Twardowski; Witold Skupień; Kamil Rosiek; Witold Skupień	26:08.4; 5:37.1 5:54.2; 8:08.4; 6:28.7	+3:21.8
10	7	China; Du Mingyuan; Ma Mingtao; Huang Feixiang; Wang Chenyang	27:42.7; 7:20.3; 6:17.4; 7:31.0; 6:34.0	+4:56.1
11	12	Neutral Paralympic Athletes; Natalia Kocherova; Ekaterina Rumyantseva; Nadezhda Fedorova; Natalia Bratiuk	28:18.4; 7:21.4; 6:28.5; 8:00.2; 6:28.3	+5:31.8
12	5	United States; Andrew Soule; Mia Zutter; Guide: Kristina Trygstad-Saari; Sean Halsted; Grace Miller	28:23.1; 6:12.2; 6:43.3 7:51.6; 7:36.0	+5:36.5

== See also ==
- Cross-country skiing at the 2018 Winter Olympics
