= Cross-country skiing at the 2022 Winter Paralympics – Men's 20 kilometre classical =

Men's 20 kilometre classical at the XIII Paralympic Winter Games
- Paralympic cross-country skiing
- Dates: 6–7 March

Men's 20 kilometre classical (visually impaired) at the XIII Paralympic Winter Games
- Competitors: 8 from 8 nations

Medalists
1st place, gold medalist(s)		Brian McKeever; Guide: Russell Kennedy, Graham Nishikawa	Canada
2nd place, silver medalist(s)		Jake Adicoff; Guide: Sam Wood	United States
3rd place, bronze medalist(s)		Zebastian Modin; Guide: Emil Jönsson Haag	Sweden

Men's 20 kilometre classical (standing) at the XIII Paralympic Winter Games
- Competitors: 17

Medalists
1st place, gold medalist(s)		Taiki Kawayoke	Japan
2nd place, silver medalist(s)		Cai Jiayun	China
3rd place, bronze medalist(s)		Qiu Mingyang	China

Men's 18 kilometre classical (sitting) at the XIII Paralympic Winter Games

Medalists
1st place, gold medalist(s)		Zheng Peng	China
2nd place, silver medalist(s)		Mao Zhongwu	China
3rd place, bronze medalist(s)		Collin Cameron	Canada

The Men's 20 kilometre classical competition of the 2022 Winter Paralympics was held at the National Biathlon Center in Beijing on 6 and 7 March 2022.

== Medal table ==
Rank	Nation	Gold	Silver	Bronze	Total
1	China (CHN)*	1	2	1	4
2	Canada (CAN)	1	0	1	2
3	Japan (JPN)	1	0	0	1
4	United States (USA)	0	1	0	1
5	Sweden (SWE)	0	0	1	1
Totals (5 entries)		3	3	3	9

== 20 km visually impaired ==
In the cross-country skiing visually impaired, the athlete with a visual impairment has a sighted guide. The two skiers are considered a team, and dual medals are awarded.

Rank	Bib	Name	Country	Time	Difference
1st place, gold medalist(s)	68	Brian McKeever; Guide: Russell Kennedy, Graham Nishikawa	Canada	55:36.7	–
2nd place, silver medalist(s)	66	Jake Adicoff; Guide: Sam Wood	United States	58:54.4	+3:17.7
3rd place, bronze medalist(s)	67	Zebastian Modin; Guide: Emil Jönsson Haag	Sweden	1:00:05.4	+4:28.7
4	64	Inkki Inola; Guide: Jari Huhta	Finland	1:01:34.4	+5:57.7
5	62	Xu He; Guide: Diao C.	China	1:02:16.9	+6:40.2
6	65	Piotr Garbowski; Guide: Jakub Twardowski	Poland	1:06:00.7	+10:24.0
7	61	Ryohei Ariyasu; Guide: Y. Fujita	Japan	1:15:04.8	+19:28.1
	63	Thomas Oxaal; Guide: Ole-Martin Lid	Norway	DNS	

== 20 km standing ==
Rank	Bib	Name	Country	Time	Difference
1st place, gold medalist(s)	55	Taiki Kawayoke	Japan	52:52.8	–
2nd place, silver medalist(s)	44	Cai Jiayun	China	54:27.7	+1:34.9
3rd place, bronze medalist(s)	51	Qiu Mingyang	China	54:29.7	+1:36.9
4	57	Mark Arendz	Canada	54:43.9	+1:51.1
5	56	Witold Skupien	Poland	55:22.2	+2:29.4
6	46	Li Taiyun	China	56:47.0	+3:54.2
7	53	Yoshihiro Nitta	Japan	57:46.7	+4:53.9
8	47	Wang Chenyang	China	58:03.1	+5:10.3
9	45	Ma Mingtao	China	58:32.9	+5:40.1
10	43	Kjartan Haugen	Norway	59:29.8	+6:37.0
11	52	Luca Tavasci	Switzerland	1:01:10.0	+8:17.2
12	49	Batmönkhiin Ganbold	Mongolia	1:04:23.5	+11:30.7
13	48	Keigo Iwamoto	Japan	1:04:58.7	+12:05.9
14	41	Pol Makuri Redolad Garcia	Spain	1:05:08.8	+12:16.0
15	42	Serafym Drahun	Ukraine	1:08:42.2	+15:49.4
	50	Dashdorj Tsegmid	Mongolia	DNF	
	54	Alexander Ehler	Germany	DNF	

== 18 km sitting ==
Rank	Bib	Name	Country	Time	Difference
1st place, gold medalist(s)	11	Zheng Peng	China	43:09.2	–
2nd place, silver medalist(s)	13	Mao Zhongwu	China	43:23.8	+14.6
3rd place, bronze medalist(s)	22	Collin Cameron	Canada	47:36.6	+4:27.4
4	8	Du Tian	China	47:44.1	+4:34.9
5	25	Giuseppe Romele	Italy	48:03.3	+4:54.1
6	20	Daniel Cnossen	United States	49:22.7	+6:13.5
7	14	Yerbol Khamitov	Kazakhstan	49:23.1	+6:13.9
8	19	Eui Hyun Shin	South Korea	49:26.2	+6:17.0
9	15	Martin Fleig	Germany	49:53.9	+6:44.7
10	24	Taras Rad	Ukraine	50:25.3	+7:16.1
11	21	Vasyl Kravchuk	Ukraine	50:38.7	+7:29.5
12	16	Scott Meenagh	Great Britain	50:41.6	+7:32.4
13	17	Derek Zaplotinsky	Canada	50:42.6	+7:33.4
14	23	Cristian Ribera	Brazil	52:29.1	+9:19.9
15	18	Maksym Yarovyi	Ukraine	53:30.1	+10:20.9
16	5	Josh Sweeney	United States	54:07.7	+10:58.5
17	4	Nicolas Lima	Argentina	54:20.8	+11:11.6
18	7	Ethan Hess	Canada	54:35.9	+11:26.7
19	12	Guilherme Rocha	Brazil	55:18.9	+12:09.7
20	10	Robelson Lula	Brazil	57:17.7	+14:08.5
21	3	Michele Biglione	Italy	57:38.0	+14:28.8
22	1	Jaeseok Jeong	South Korea	58:19.6	+15:10.4
23	9	Wesley Vinicius dos Santos	Brazil	58:23.5	+15:14.3
24	2	Yuriy Berezin	Kazakhstan	58:27.0	+15:17.8
25	6	Denis Petrenko	Kazakhstan	59:19.2	+16:10.0

== See also ==
- Cross-country skiing at the 2022 Winter Olympics
