= Cross-country skiing at the 2022 Winter Paralympics – Open 4 × 2.5 kilometre relay =

Open relay at the XIII Paralympic Winter Games
- Paralympic cross-country skiing
- Venue: National Biathlon Center
- Dates: 13 March
- Competitors: 38 from 12 nations
- Teams: 12
- Winning time: 28:05.3

Medalists
1st place, gold medalist(s)		Dmytro Suiarko; Guide: Oleksandr Nikonovych; Grygorii Vovchynskyi; Vasyl Kravchuk; Anatolii Kovalevskyi; Guide: Oleksandr Mukshyn	Ukraine
2nd place, silver medalist(s)		Benjamin Daviet; Guide: Alexandre Pouye; Anthony Chalençon; Guide: Brice Ottonello	France
3rd place, bronze medalist(s)		Kjartan Haugen; Vilde Nilsen; Kjartan Haugen; Thomas Oxaal; Guide: Ole-Martin Lid	Norway

The open 4 × 2.5 kilometre relay competition of the 2022 Winter Paralympics was held at the National Biathlon Center in Beijing on 13 March 2022.

== Results ==
Rank	Bib	Country	Time	Deficit
1st place, gold medalist(s)	3	Ukraine; Dmytro Suiarko; Guide: Oleksandr Nikonovych; Grygorii Vovchynskyi; Vasyl Kravchuk; Anatolii Kovalevskyi; Guide: Oleksandr Mukshyn	28:05.3	–
2nd place, silver medalist(s)	6	France; Benjamin Daviet; Guide: Alexandre Pouye; Anthony Chalençon; Guide: Brice Ottonello; Benjamin Daviet; Anthony Chalençon	28:30.4	+25.1
3rd place, bronze medalist(s)	5	Norway; Kjartan Haugen; Vilde Nilsen; Kjartan Haugen; Thomas Oxaal; Guide: Ole-Martin Lid	28:41.0	+35.7
4	4	China; Xu He; Guide: Diao C. Dang Hesong; Guide: Qing H. Mao Zhongwu; Yu Shuang; Guide: Wang Guanyu	29:01.9	+56.6
5	8	Kazakhstan; Yerbol Khamitov; Alexandr Gerlits; Yerbol Khamitov; Alexandr Gerlits	30:00.4	+1:55.1
6	1	Canada; Brian McKeever; Guide: Russell Kennedy; Brittany Hudak; Brian McKeever; Guide: Russell Kennedy; Brittany Hudak	30:24.7	+2:19.4
7	7	Japan; Yoshihiro Nitta; Taiki Kawayoke; Yoshihiro Nitta; Taiki Kawayoke	31:38.1	+3:32.8
8	11	Germany; Martin Fleig; Linn Kazmaier; Guide: Florian Baumann; Alexander Ehler; Johanna Recktenwald; Guide: Valentin Haag	31:40.1	+3:34.8
9	2	United States; Max Nelson; Guide: S. Hamilton; Drew Shea; Kendall Gretsch; Ruslan Reiter	33:03.0	+4:57.7
10	10	Italy; Michele Biglione; Cristian Toninelli; Giuseppe Romele; Cristian Toninelli	34:04.7	+5:59.4
11	12	Poland; Monika Kukla; Paweł Nowicki; Guide: J. Kobryn; Krzysztof Plewa; Paweł Gil; Guide: M. Landa	34:27.3	+6:22.0
12	9	Great Britain; Steve Arnold; Scott Meenagh; Steve Thomas; Callum Deboys	35:27.3	+7:22.0

== See also ==
- Cross-country skiing at the 2022 Winter Olympics
