= Para cross-country skiing at the 2026 Winter Paralympics – Open 4 × 2.5 kilometre relay =

Mixed relay at the XIV Paralympic Winter Games
- Paralympic cross-country skiing
- Venue: Tesero Cross-Country Skiing Stadium
- Dates: 14 March
- Competitors: 40 from 11 nations
- Teams: 11
- Winning time: 21:54.4

Medalists
1st place, gold medalist(s)		Dang Hesong; Guide: Lu Hongda; Wang Tao; Wang Chenyang; Yu Shuang; Guide: Shang Jinca	China
2nd place, silver medalist(s)		Theo Bold; Guide: Jakob Bold; Sebastian Marburger; Linn Kazmaier; Guide: Florian Baumann; Marco Maier	Germany
3rd place, bronze medalist(s)		Kjartan Haugen; Vilde Nilsen; Thomas Oxaal; Guide: Geir Lervik	Norway

The open 4 × 2.5 kilometre relay competition of the 2026 Winter Paralympics was held on 14 March 2026 at the Tesero Cross-Country Skiing Stadium.

== Results ==
Rank	Bib	Country	Time	Deficit
1st place, gold medalist(s)	5	China; Dang Hesong; Guide: Lu Hongda; Wang Tao; Wang Chenyang; Yu Shuang; Guide: Shang Jinca	21:54.4	–
2nd place, silver medalist(s)	2	Germany; Theo Bold; Guide: Jakob Bold; Sebastian Marburger; Linn Kazmaier; Guide: Florian Baumann; Marco Maier	21:59.8	+5.4
3rd place, bronze medalist(s)	4	Norway; Kjartan Haugen; Kjartan Haugen; Vilde Nilsen; Thomas Oxaal; Guide: Geir Lervik	22:28.6	+34.2
4	1	Ukraine; Dmytro Suiarko; Guide: Oleksandr Nikonovych; Vasyl Kravchuk; Grygorii Vovchynskyi; Serafym Drahun	22:28.8	+34.4
5	9	Kazakhstan; Yerbol Khamitov; Yerbol Khamitov; Vladislav Kobal; Alexandr Gerlits	23:18.5	+1:24.1
6	8	France; Benjamin Daviet; Karl Tabouret; Anthony Chalençon; Guide: florian Michelon; Benjamin Daviet	23:47.6	+1:53.2
7	7	Japan; Yoshihiro Nitta; Hiroaki Mori; Taiki Kawayoke; Taiki Kawayoke	24:44.7	+2:50.3
8	11	Poland; Krzysztof Plewa; Piotr Garbowski; Guide: Jakub Twardowski; Błażej Bieńko; Guide: Michał Lańda; Aneta Kobryń; Guide: Bartłomiej Puto	24:46.8	+2:52.4
9	10	Italy; Michele Biglione; Marco Pisani; Mattia Dal Pastro; Cristian Toninelli	26:07.4	+4:13.0
10	3	Canada; Logan Larivière; Guide: Joseph Hutton; Jesse Bachinsky; Guide: Levi Nadlersmith; Emma Archibald; Maddie Mullin; Guide: Brooke Ailey	26:40.2	+4:45.8
11	12	United States; Erin Martin; Michael Kneeland; Max Nelson; Guide: Gus Schatzlein; Jack Berry	30:20.6	+8.26.2
	6	Czech Republic; Miroslav Motejzík; Simona Bubeníčková; Guide: David Šrůtek; Matěj Škoda; Matěj Škoda	DNS	

== See also ==
- Cross-country skiing at the 2026 Winter Olympics
