= Cross-country skiing at the 2022 Winter Paralympics – Mixed 4 × 2.5 kilometre relay =

Mixed relay at the XIII Paralympic Winter Games
- Paralympic cross-country skiing
- Venue: National Biathlon Center
- Dates: 13 March
- Competitors: 30 from 8 nations
- Teams: 8
- Winning time: 25:59.3

Medalists
1st place, gold medalist(s)		Oksana Masters; Sydney Peterson; Daniel Cnossen; Jake Adicoff; Guide: Sam Wood	United States
2nd place, silver medalist(s)		Shan Yilin; Wang Chenyang; Zheng Peng; Cai Jiayun	China
3rd place, bronze medalist(s)		Collin Cameron; Emily Young; Mark Arendz; Natalie Wilkie	Canada

The mixed 4 × 2.5 kilometre relay competition of the 2022 Winter Paralympics was held at the National Biathlon Center in Beijing on 13 March 2022.

== Results ==
Rank	Bib	Country	Time	Deficit
1st place, gold medalist(s)	6	United States; Oksana Masters; Sydney Peterson; Daniel Cnossen; Jake Adicoff; Guide: Sam Wood	25:59.3	–
2nd place, silver medalist(s)	7	China; Shan Yilin; Wang Chenyang; Zheng Peng; Cai Jiayun	26:25.3	+26.0
3rd place, bronze medalist(s)	4	Canada; Collin Cameron; Emily Young; Mark Arendz; Natalie Wilkie	27:00.6	+1:01.3
4	1	Ukraine; Taras Rad; Iryna Bui; Pavlo Bal; Oleksandra Kononova	27:21.9	+1:22.6
5	8	Germany; Anja Wicker; Leonie Maria Walter; Guide: Pirmin Strecker; Marco Maier; Nico Messinger; Guide: Robin Wunderle	27:50.1	+1:50.8
6	5	Poland; Witold Skupień; Iweta Faron; Witold Skupień; Iweta Faron	30:02.2	+4:02.9
7	3	Japan; Keigo Iwamoto; Momoko Dekijima; Hiroaki Mori; Yurika Abe	31:17.7	+5:18.4
8	2	Brazil; Robelson Lula; Cristian Ribera; Aline Rocha; Guilherme Rocha	34:10.8	+8:11.5

== See also ==
- Cross-country skiing at the 2022 Winter Olympics
