= Para cross-country skiing at the 2026 Winter Paralympics – Mixed 4 × 2.5 kilometre relay =

Mixed relay at the XIV Paralympic Winter Games
- Paralympic cross-country skiing
- Venue: Tesero Cross-Country Skiing Stadium
- Dates: 14 March
- Competitors: 35 from 10 nations
- Teams: 10
- Winning time: 23:24.2

Medalists
1st place, gold medalist(s)		Joshua Sweeney; Oksana Masters; Sydney Peterson; Jake Adicoff; Guide: Reid Goble	United States
2nd place, silver medalist(s)		Pavlo Bal; Taras Rad; Oleksandra Kononova; Liudmyla Liashenko	Ukraine
3rd place, bronze medalist(s)		Mao Zhongwu; Zheng Peng; Wang Yue; Guide: Chen Guoming; Huang Lingxin	China

The mixed 4 × 2.5 kilometre relay competition of the 2026 Winter Paralympics was held on 14 March 2026 at the Tesero Cross-Country Skiing Stadium.

== Results ==
Rank	Bib	Country	Time	Deficit
1st place, gold medalist(s)	1	United States; Joshua Sweeney; Oksana Masters; Sydney Peterson; Jake Adicoff; Guide: Reid Goble	23:24.2	–
2nd place, silver medalist(s)	4	Ukraine; Pavlo Bal; Taras Rad; Oleksandra Kononova; Liudmyla Liashenko	23:36.7	+12.5
3rd place, bronze medalist(s)	8	China; Mao Zhongwu; Zheng Peng; Wang Yue; Guide: Chen Guoming; Huang Lingxin	23:56.5	+32.3
4	2	Germany; Nico Messinger; Guide: Robin Wunderle; Anja Wicker; Leonie Walter; Guide: Christian Krasman; Lennart Volkert; Guide: Nils Kolb	24:10.4	+46.2
5	9	Canada; Derek Zaplotinsky; Collin Cameron; Natalie Wilkie; Mark Arendz	24:15.1	+50.9
6	5	Russia; Ivan Golubkov; Ivan Golubkov; Anastasiia Bagiian; Guide: Sergei Siniakin; Anastasiia Bagiian; Guide: Sergei Siniakin	24:40.2	+1:16.0
7	7	Brazil; Cristian Ribera; Aline Rocha; Wellington da Silva; Wellington da Silva	27:00.5	+3:36.3
8	3	Japan; Takaharu Minamoto; Keigo Iwamoto; Yurika Abe; Mika Iwamoto	27:29.2	+4:05.0
9	10	Belarus; Lidziya Loban; Valiantsina Biryla; Raman Svirydzenka; Darya Fedzkovich	28:31.8	+5:07.6
10	6	Sweden; Arnt-Christian Furuberg; Arnt-Christian Furuberg; Alice Morelius; Alice Morelius	30:23.2	+6:59.0

== See also ==
- Cross-country skiing at the 2026 Winter Olympics
