= Bohdana Konashuk =

Ukrainian Paralympic Nordic skier (born 1998)

Personal information
- Born: 18 March 1998 (age 28) Lutsk, Ukraine

Sport
- Country: Ukraine
- Sport: Paralympic Nordic skiing
- Disability class: LW8
Medal record
Representing Ukraine
Women's para biathlon
World Championships
Silver medal – second place	2023 Östersund	10km middle
Silver medal – second place	2023 Östersund	12.5km individual
Bronze medal – third place	2023 Östersund	7.5km sprint
Women's paralympic cross-country skiing
World Championships
Silver medal – second place	2023 Östersund	4×2.5km relay

Bohdana Konashuk (Ukrainian: Богдана Конашук; born 18 March 1998) is a Ukrainian Paralympic cross-country skier and biathlete.

== Career ==
Konashuk competed at the 2023 World Para Nordic Skiing Championships in para biathlon and won silver medals in the 10 kilometre middle, 12.5 kilometre individual, and a bronze medal in the 7.5 kilometre sprint. She also competed in para cross-country and won a silver medal in the 4×2.5km relay.

In February 2026, she was selected to represent Ukraine at the 2026 Winter Paralympics.
