= Serhii Romaniuk =

Ukrainian Paralympic Nordic skier (born 1995)

Personal information
- Born: 22 February 1995 (age 31) Zakarpatska, Ukraine

Sport
- Country: Ukraine
- Sport: Paralympic Nordic skiing
- Disability class: LW8
Medal record
Men's para biathlon
Representing Ukraine
World Championships
Bronze medal – third place	2023 Östersund	7.5km sprint
Bronze medal – third place	2023 Östersund	10km middle

Serhii Romaniuk (Ukrainian: Сергій Романюк, born 22 February 1995) is a Ukrainian Paralympic cross-country skier and biathlete.

== Career ==
Romaniuk competed at the 2023 World Para Nordic Skiing Championships and won bronze medals in the 7.5 kilometre sprint and 10 kilometre middle events.

In February 2026, he was selected to represent Ukraine at the 2026 Winter Paralympics.
