= Johanna Recktenwald =

German Para cross-country skier and biathlete (born 2001)

Personal information
- Born: 11 June 2001 (age 25) Marpingen, St. Wendel, Germany

Sport
- Country: Germany
- Sport: Para Nordic skiing (Para cross-country skiing and Para biathlon)
- Disability: Cone-rod dystrophy
- Disability class: NS2
Medal record
Representing Germany
Women's Para biathlon
Paralympic Games
Bronze medal – third place	2026 Milano Cortina	12.5 km Individual
World Championships
Silver medal – second place	2023 Östersund	12.5 km Individual
Bronze medal – third place	2023 Östersund	7.5 km sprint
Bronze medal – third place	2023 Östersund	Sprint freestyle
Women's Para cross-country skiing
World University Games
Silver medal – second place	2025 Turin	Sprint classical
Silver medal – second place	2025 Turin	10 km freestyle

Johanna Recktenwald (born 11 June 2001) is a German visually impaired Para cross-country skier and biathlete. She represented Germany at the 2022 and 2026 Winter Paralympics.

== Career ==
Recktenwald represented Germany at the 2022 Winter Paralympics and finished in fourth place in both the 10 kilometres and 12.5 kilometres.

She competed at the 2023 World Para Nordic Skiing Championships and won a silver medal in the 12.5 kilometre Individual event, and bronze medals in the 7.5 kilometre sprint and the sprint freestyle events.

In January 2025, Recktenwald competed at the 2025 Winter World University Games in para-cross country skiing and won silver medals in the sprint classical and the 10 kilometre freestyle events.

She won the 2026 overall Para-Biathlon World Cup. In February 2026, she was selected to represent Germany at the 2026 Winter Paralympics.

== Personal life ==
Recktenwald was diagnosed with cone-rod dystrophy, which causes progressive vision loss.
