= Marco Maier =

German Para cross-country skier and biathlete (born 1999)

Personal information
- Born: 20 December 1999 (age 26) Oberstdorf, Germany

Sport
- Country: Germany
- Sport: Para Nordic skiing (Para cross-country skiing and Para biathlon)
- Disability class: LW8
- Club: SV Kirchzarten
- Coached by: Ralf Rombach
Medal record
Representing Germany
Men's Para biathlon
Winter Paralympics
Silver medal – second place	2022 Beijing	6 km standing
Bronze medal – third place	2026 Milano Cortina	Sprint standing
Bronze medal – third place	2026 Milano Cortina	Individual standing
Bronze medal – third place	2026 Milano Cortina	Sprint pursuit standing
World Championships
Gold medal – first place	2023 Östersund	7.5 km standing
Men's Para cross-country skiing
Winter Paralympics
Silver medal – second place	2022 Beijing	1.5 km standing
Silver medal – second place	2026 Milano Cortina	4 × 2.5 km relay open
World Championships
Gold medal – first place	2023 Östersund	Sprint standing
Gold medal – first place	2023 Östersund	4×2.5 km open relay
Winter Universiade
Gold medal – first place	2025 Torino	10 km freestyle
Gold medal – first place	2025 Torino	Sprint classical

Marco Maier (born 20 December 1999) is a German Para cross-country skier and biathlete. He represented Germany at the 2022 and 2026 Winter Paralympics.

== Career ==
Maier represented Germany at the 2022 Winter Paralympics in biathlon and won a silver medal in the 6 kilometres standing event. He also competed in cross-country skiiing and won a silver medal in the 1.5 kilometre sprint. He was subsequently named the German Para Athlete of the Year.

He competed at the 2023 World Para Nordic Skiing Championships in para biathlon and won a gold medal in the 7.5 kilometre sprint. He also competed in para cross-country and won a gold medal in the sprint freestyle and 4×2.5 kilometre open relay events.

He competed at the 2025 Winter World University Games in para-cross-country skiing and won the first-ever para gold medal, winning the 10 kilometer freestyle event. He also won a gold medal in the sprint classical event.
