= Aaron Pike (athlete) =

American wheelchair racer, biathlete and cross-country skier

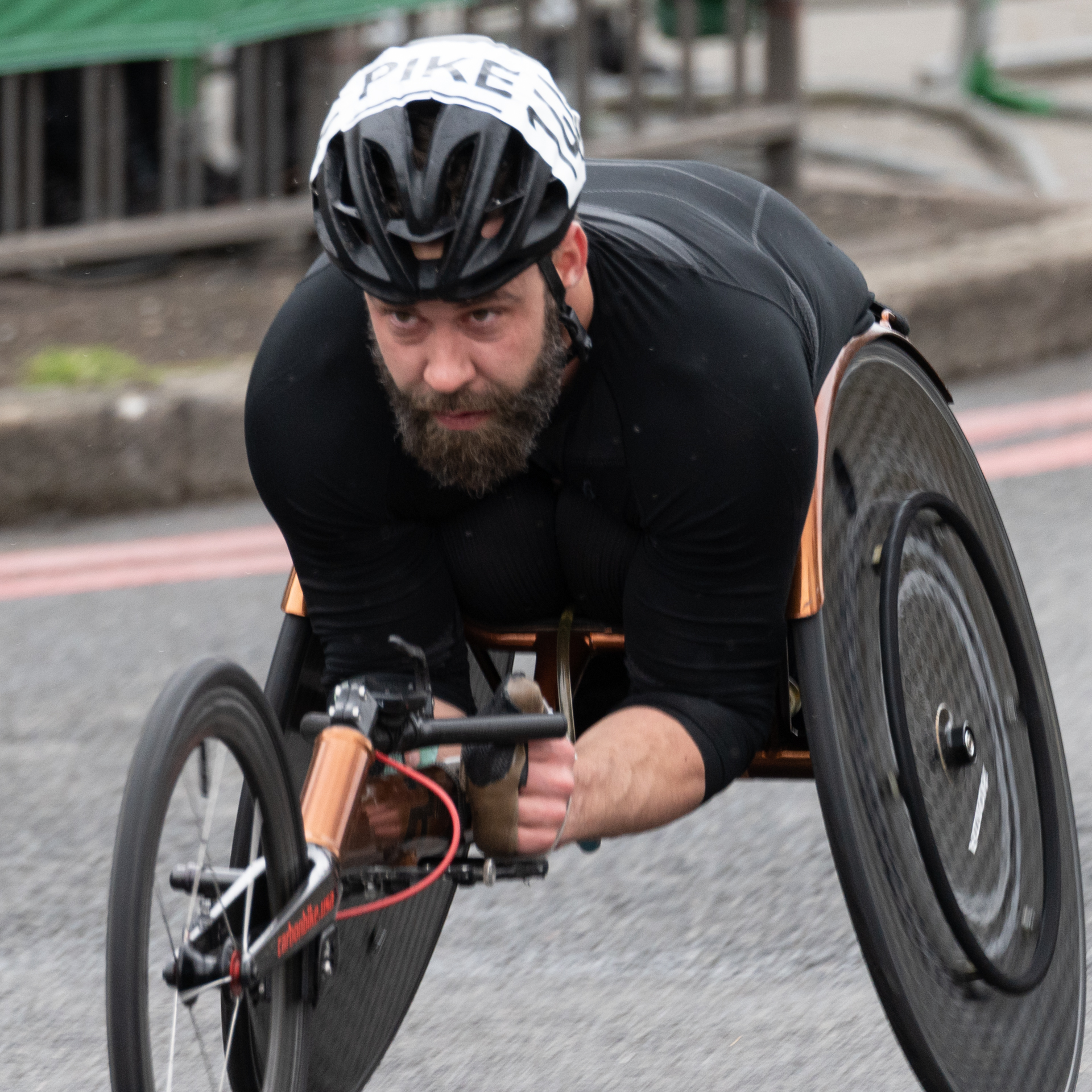
- Pike competing in the 2023 London Marathon Wheelchair elite race

Personal information
- Born: May 4, 1986 (age 40) Park Rapids, Minnesota, U.S.
- Education: University of Illinois Urbana-Champaign
- Life partner: Oksana Masters

Sport
- Sport: Wheelchair racing; Biathlon; Cross-country skiing
- Disability class: T54 (wheelchair racing)

Achievements and titles
- Paralympic finals: 2012, 2016, 2020, 2024 (Summer); 2014, 2018, 2022 (Winter)
- World finals: 2011 (wheelchair racing); 2015, 2017, 2019, 2021, 2023 (winter sports)
Medal record
Representing United States
Para biathlon
World Para Nordic Skiing Championships
Bronze medal – third place	2019 Prince George	Sprint
Gold medal – first place	2023 Ostersund	12.5 km sitting
Silver medal – second place	2023 Ostersund	7.5 km sitting
Silver medal – second place	2023 Ostersund	10 km sitting
World Para Snow Sports Championships
Silver medal – second place	2021 Lillehammer	12.5 km sitting
Wheelchair racing
World Marathon Majors
Bronze medal – third place	2021 Chicago	Marathon
Silver medal – second place	2022 Boston	Marathon
Bronze medal – third place	2022 Chicago	Marathon

Aaron Pike (born May 4, 1986) is an American athlete who competes in wheelchair racing, biathlon, and cross-country skiing. He has competed at the 2012, 2016 and 2020 Summer Paralympics, as well as the 2014, 2018 and 2022 Winter Paralympics. Pike finished second at the 2022 Boston Marathon, third at the 2021 and 2022 Chicago Marathons, and fourth at the 2018 and 2019 New York City Marathons as well as the 2021 Boston Marathon. He won multiple medals at the 2023 World Para Nordic Skiing Championships, including winning the 12.5 km seated event.

== Personal life ==
Pike is from Park Rapids, Minnesota, US. His father served in the military, and as a result, Pike grew up in four different US states, and spent time in Germany. He studied at Ramstein High School in Kaiserslautern, Germany. At the age of 13, he was accidentally shot in a hunting accident in Virginia, US, which damaged his spinal cord. He studied sociology at the University of Illinois Urbana-Champaign, and now lives in Champaign, Illinois. Pike is engaged to fellow summer and winter Paralympian Oksana Masters.

== Wheelchair racing career ==
Pike started wheelchair racing in 2006, at the University of Illinois. He also participated in wheelchair basketball. At the 2011 IPC Athletics World Championships, he finished 26th and last in the heats of the 1,500 meters T54 event, and 19th overall in the marathon T54 race.

At the 2012 Summer Paralympics, he came sixteenth in the marathon T54 event, and was eliminated in the heats of the 1,500 meters and 5,000 meters T54 events. He was part of the American team that finished sixth the 4 × 400 meters T53/54 relay. In 2013, he came second at the Twin Cities Marathon. He competed at the 2014 Chicago and New York City Marathons.

At the 2016 Summer Paralympics, he came tenth in the marathon T54 event, in a time of 1:30:13. He was eliminated in the heats of the 1,500 meters T54 event. The same year, he finished second at the OneAmerica 500 Festival Mini-Marathon, behind winner Kim Gyu-dae. Pike came seventh at the 2016 London Marathon and eighth at the 2016 New York City Marathon. He came seventh again at the 2017 London Marathon, and fourth at the 2018 New York City Marathon. He finished ninth at the 2019 London Marathon, and fourth again at the 2019 New York City Marathon. In the same year, he came 8th in the 5,000 meters T54 event at the 2019 World Para Athletics Championships. He has won the Grandma's Marathon on three occasions, and set a new course record of 1:20:59 in the 2019 race; he did not compete at the 2021 Grandma's Marathon, due to a scheduling clash.

In June 2021, he was selected in the American team for the delayed 2020 Summer Paralympics, in the 800 meters, 1,500 meters and 5,000 meters T54 events. He had finished second to Daniel Romanchuk at the U.S. Paralympic Team Track and Field Trials in all three events earlier in the month, and was also selected for the marathon T54 race. He came fifth in his 5,000 meters heat, and did not qualify for the final. He came ninth in his 1,500 meters heat, and did not qualify for the final. He came third in his 800 meters heat, and again did not qualify for the final. Pike came sixth in the marathon T54 race. Pike came fifth at the 2021 London Marathon. He competed at the 2021 Chicago and Boston Marathons on consecutive days; the races were 900 miles (1,400 km) apart. He finished third overall in Chicago, and fourth in Boston.

Pike finished second at the 2022 Boston Marathon in a time of 1:32:49. He was almost six minutes behind race winner Daniel Romanchuk. Later in the year, he finished third at the 2022 Chicago Marathon, after losing to Romanchuk in a sprint finish for second place.

Pike competed at the 2024 Summer Paralympics in Paris, competing in the 1500 meters T54, 500 meters T54 and Marathon T54 events.

== Winter sports career ==
After the 2012 Summer Paralympics, Pike took up skiing, initially in order to take a break from wheelchair racing. He was invited to try skiing by a coach of the U.S. Paralympic Nordic Skiing National Team, and joined the US team in 2013. He now competes in biathlon and cross-country skiing.

At the 2014 Winter Paralympics, he competed in the 7.5 km and 15 km sitting biathlon events, and the 1 km sprint, 10 km and 15 km cross-country sit-skiing races. He competed at the 2015 World Para Nordic Skiing Championships in Cable, Wisconsin, US. It was his first World Skiing Championship event.

He came fourth in the 15 km biathlon event at the 2017 World Para Nordic Skiing Championships. At the 2018 Winter Paralympics in Pyeongchang, he competed in the 7.5 km, 12.5 km and 15 km sitting biathlon events, and the 1.1 km sitting cross-country sprint events. In the 15 km biathlon event, he succeeded in all 20 shots, and finished sixth overall. At the 2019 World Para Nordic Skiing Championships, Pike came third in the sprint biathlon event. At the 2021 World Para Snow Sports Championships, Pike came second in the biathlon event.

In February 2022, Pike was included in the American team for the 2022 Winter Paralympics. In biathlon, he finished eighth in the 6 km sitting biathlon sprint event, ninth in the 12.5 km sitting event, and 15th in the 10 km sitting event. He came sixth in his semi-final in the 1.5 km sprint sitting cross-country event, and did not qualify for the final.

Pike won the 12.5 km seated event at the 2023 World Para Nordic Skiing Championships. He also finished second in the 7.5 km sprint and 10 km events.

At the 2025 Para Biathlon World Championships, Pike won the 7.5 km seated event.
