= Thomas Clarion =

French Para cross-country skier and biathlete (born 1982)

Personal information
- Born: 15 March 1982 (age 44) Sallanches, France

Sport
- Country: France
- Sport: Para Nordic skiing (Para cross-country skiing and Para biathlon)
- Disability class: B1
- Partner: Antoine Bollet (guide)
Medal record
Men's Para cross-country skiing
Representing France
Winter Paralympics
| Gold medal – first place | 2018 Pyeongchang | 4 x 2.5km relay open |
| Bronze medal – third place | 2014 Sochi | 4 x 2.5 km open relay |
| Bronze medal – third place | 2014 Sochi | 10km visually impaired |
| Bronze medal – third place | 2018 Pyeongchang | 20km free visually impaired |

Thomas Clarion (born 15 March 1982) is a French male visually impaired Para cross-country skier and biathlete who is also well known as a physiotherapist. Clarion became blind at the age of 20. He has competed at the Winter Paralympics in 2010, 2014 and 2018.

== Career ==
Thomas Clarion competed in his first Paralympic event in 2010 and went medalless during the competition. He claimed 2 bronze medals at the 2014 Winter Paralympics in the men's 10km cross-country skiing event and 4 x 2.5 km relay open event.

He went onto represent France at the 2018 Winter Paralympics, his third Paralympic event and managed to claim a bronze medal in the men's 20km free visually impaired cross-country skiing event which was also his third Paralympic medal. He claimed his first Paralympic gold medal during the 2018 Winter Paralympics after winning the men's 4 x 2.5 km relay open team event for France along with other members including Benjamin Daviet and Anthony Chalençon.
