= Scott Meenagh =

British Para Nordic skier and biathlete (born 1989)

Personal information
- Full name: Scott James Meenagh
- Born: 16 September 1989 (age 37) Cumbernauld, Scotland

Sport
- Sport: Rugby union; Para rowing; Para Nordic skiing
- Disability class: LW12
- Events: Para cross-country skiing; Para biathlon

Achievements and titles
- Paralympic finals: 2018, 2022
- World finals: 2023
Medal record
Para biathlon
Representing Great Britain
World Para Nordic Skiing Championships
Silver medal – second place	2023 Östersund	12.5 km sitting

Scott James Meenagh (born 16 September 1989) is a British Para Nordic skier and former British Army soldier. Meenagh came second in the 12.5 km individual biathlon event at the 2023 World Para Nordic Skiing Championships, and competed at the 2018 and 2022 Winter Paralympics.

== Early life and Army career ==
Meenagh is from Cumbernauld, Scotland. He played rugby league for Scotland under-18s.

Meeangh served in the British Army Parachute Regiment, and was deployed to Afghanistan. In 2011, he lost both of his legs after stepping on an improvised explosive device in Helmand Province. He was rehabilitated at Headley Court, and now uses prosthetic limbs. Meenagh was a spectator of the Para Nordic skiing events at the 2014 Winter Paralympics in Sochi, Russia.

== Sports career ==
Meenagh competed in Para rowing, and was a captain of the British Army team at the 2014 Invictus Games. He failed to qualify for the 2016 Summer Paralympics.

Meenagh joined the Armed Forces Para Snow Sports team in 2016. Meenagh was selected for the 2018 Winter Paralympics in Pyeongchang, South Korea. He was the first British Nordic skier at a Paralympics for 20 years. He finished 17th in the 15km free cross-country event. In biathlon, he finished 16th in the 7.5km event, 13th in the 12.5km event and 14th in the 15km event.

Meenagh was selected for the 2022 Winter Paralympics. He finished 12th in the 18km classical event, and was part of the first British relay team to finish the 4 × 2.5km relay event at a Paralympics, alongside Steve Arnold, Steve Thomas and Callum Deboys.

Meenagh came second in the 12.5 km individual biathlon event at the 2023 World Para Nordic Skiing Championships. He was the first Briton to win a medal at the Championships, and he also finished fourth in the 7.5 km individual biathlon event. He was the only British competitor at the Championships.
