= Danielle Aravich =

American paralympic athlete (born 1996)

Dani Aravich
Personal information
- Full name: Danielle Aravich
- Nationality: American
- Born: May 8, 1996 (age 30) Idaho, United States

Sport
- Sport: Para biathlon, Cross-country skiing, Athletics
- Disability class: LW8 / T47

Achievements and titles
- Paralympic finals: Tokyo 2020, Beijing 2022, Milan/Cortina 2026
Medal record
Women's para cross-country skiing
Representing United States
World Para Nordic Skiing Championships
Gold medal – first place	2023 Östersund	Mixed 4 × 2.5 km relay (classic/free)

Danielle "Dani" Aravich (born May 8, 1996) is an American Paralympic athlete who competes in para biathlon, para cross-country skiing and formerly in para-athletics. She represented the United States at the 2020 Summer Paralympics in Tokyo, Japan, the 2022 Winter Paralympics in Beijing, China, and the 2026 Winter Paralympics in Milan and Cortina, Italy.

== Biography ==
Aravich was born in the U.S. state of Idaho and grew up in Boise, Idaho. She was born without her left hand and forearm. During her youth she participated in several sports including soccer, softball, basketball and ice skating before focusing on running in cross-country and track events during high school.

She later attended Butler University, where she competed in cross-country and track and field before focusing on her studies. After graduation she returned to competitive running and eventually decided to pursue qualification for the Paralympic Games, leaving her full-time job to train as a para-athlete.

Aravich made her Paralympic debut in the women’s 400 metres T47 at the 2020 Summer Paralympics in Tokyo. Only six months later she competed at the 2022 Winter Paralympics in Beijing, where she participated in para cross-country skiing and para biathlon events.

Aravich began training in Nordic skiing after being invited to a development camp by a United States Paralympic Nordic ski coach in 2019. Her background in endurance running helped her transition into cross-country skiing and biathlon, where she quickly progressed to the international level.

In addition to competing internationally, Aravich has been active in sports governance and media work. In 2025 she became one of the athlete representatives on the International Ski and Snowboard Federation (FIS) Athletes' Commission and Council.

Ahead of the 2026 Winter Paralympics in Milan and Cortina d'Ampezzo, Aravich said her goals extend beyond medals and include helping grow the visibility and popularity of the Paralympic Movement and para sports worldwide.

== Results ==
=== Paralympic Games ===
Year	Venue	Sport	Results
2020	Japan Tokyo	Athletics	5th (heat) – 400 m T47
2022	China Beijing	Cross-country skiing	7th Sprint standing 9th Middle distance standing
2022	China Beijing	Biathlon	11th Middle distance standing 13th Sprint standing

=== World Championships ===
Year	Venue	Sport	Results
2022	Norway Lillehammer	Cross-country skiing	4th Relay
2023	Sweden Östersund	Cross-country skiing	1st Relay; 6th Sprint free
2025	Slovenia Pokljuka	Biathlon	6th Sprint pursuit 7th Sprint; 7th Individual
