= Liu Xiaobin =

Chinese Para biathlete and cross-country skier (born 2000)

Personal information
- Born: 19 September 2000 (age 26) Hebei, China

Sport
- Country: China
- Sport: Para Nordic skiing (Para cross-country skiing and Para biathlon)
- Disability class: LW5/7
Medal record
Representing China
Men's Para biathlon
Paralympic Games
Silver medal – second place	2026 Milano Cortina	Sprint standing
World Championships
Bronze medal – third place	2025 Pokljuka	Sprint standing
Men's Para cross-country skiing
Paralympic Games
Bronze medal – third place	2026 Milano Cortina	20 km standing
World Championships
Silver medal – second place	2025 Toblach	20 km standing

Liu Xiaobin (born 19 September 2000) is a Chinese Para biathlete and cross-country skier who competes in standing events.

== Career ==
Liu competed in four events at the 2022 Winter Paralympics. His best results were seventh and fourth place at the 10 kilometres and 12.5 kilometre events respectively.

In February 2025, at the Para Biathlon World Championships, Liu won the bronze medal in the sprint standing event, while at the Para Cross-Country World Championships, he won the silver medal at the 20km Interval Start Standing Free event.

Liu competed in the 2026 Winter Paralympics, where he won the silver medal in the men's sprint.
