= Wang Tao (skier) =

Chinese Para Nordic skier (born 1997)

Personal information
- Born: 27 February 1997 (age 29) Shaanxi, China

Sport
- Country: China
- Sport: Para Nordic skiing (Para cross-country skiing and Para biathlon)
- Disability class: LW12

Achievements and titles
- Paralympic finals: Beijing 2022, Milan/Cortina 2026
Medal record
Representing China
Men's Para cross-country skiing
Winter Paralympics
Gold medal – first place	2026 Milano Cortina	4 × 2.5 km relay open
World Para Nordic Skiing Championships
Bronze medal – third place	2025 Toblach	Open relay
Men's Para biathlon
World Para Biathlon Championships
Silver medal – second place	2025 Pokljuka	Sprint Sitting

Wang Tao (born 27 February 1997) is a Chinese Para Nordic skier. He represented China at the 2022 and 2026 Winter Paralympics.

== Career ==
Wang competed at the 2022 Winter Paralympics in Beijing, participating in sitting-class biathlon and cross-country skiing events. His results included 5th place in the individual sitting, 6th in the sprint sitting, and 7th in the middle distance sitting biathlon events. In cross-country skiing, he finished 5th in the sprint sitting race.

In January 2025, Wang competed at the 2025 World Para Biathlon Championships in Pokljuka, and won a silver medal in the sprint sitting event. He then competed at the 2025 World Para Nordic Skiing Championships in Toblach, and won a bronze medal in the open relay event.

In February 2026, he was selected to represent China at the 2026 Winter Paralympics. He won a gold medal in the open 4 × 2.5 kilometre relay.

== Results ==
=== Paralympic Games ===
Year	Venue	Sport	Results
2022	China Beijing	Biathlon	5th Individual Sitting; 6th Sprint Sitting; 7th Middle Distance Sitting
2022	China Beijing	Cross-country skiing	5th Sprint Sitting
2026	Italy Cortina d'Ampezzo	Biathlon	13th Sprint Sitting; 14th Individual Sitting
2026	Italy Cortina d'Ampezzo	Cross-country skiing	6th Sprint Sitting

=== World Championships ===
Year	Venue	Sport	Results
2025	Slovenia Pokljuka	Biathlon	2nd Sprint Sitting; 5th Individual Sitting; 10th Sprint Pursuit Sitting
2025	Italy Toblach	Cross-country skiing	3rd Open Relay; 8th 10 km Interval Start Sitting Classic
