= Jake Adicoff =

American Para cross-country skier and biathlete (born 1995)

Personal information
- Full name: Jacob Adicoff
- Born: May 16, 1995 (age 31) San Jose, California, U.S.
- Home town: Sun Valley, Idaho, U.S.
- Height: 5 ft 9 in (175 cm)

Sport
- Country: United States
- Sport: Para Nordic skiing (Para cross-country skiing and Para biathlon)
- Disability: Visually impaired
- Disability class: NS3
- Partner: Sawyer Kesselheim (guide)
Medal record
Men's Para cross-country skiing
Representing United States
Paralympics Games
Gold medal – first place	2022 Beijing	4 × 2.5 km mixed relay
Gold medal – first place	2026 Milan Cortina	Sprint visually impaired
Gold medal – first place	2026 Milan Cortina	10 km classical visually impaired
Gold medal – first place	2026 Milan Cortina	20 km freestyle visually impaired
Gold medal – first place	2026 Milan Cortina	4 × 2.5 km mixed relay
Silver medal – second place	2018 Pyeongchang	10km classical visually impaired
Silver medal – second place	2022 Beijing	20km classical visually impaired
Silver medal – second place	2022 Beijing	1.5km sprint visually impaired

Jacob Adicoff (born May 16, 1995) is an American visually impaired Para cross-country skier and biathlete. He competed at the Winter Paralympics in 2014, 2018, 2022 and 2026.

== Career ==
Jake Adicoff claimed his first Paralympic medal after clinching a silver medal in the men's 10km visually impaired cross-country skiing event during the 2018 Winter Paralympics. Notably, he dedicated the silver medal to Mugsy, his dog.

He won the gold medal in the men's 12.5 km visually impaired cross-country skiing event at the 2021 World Para Snow Sports Championships held in Lillehammer, Norway. He also won the bronze medal in the men's long-distance visually impaired cross-country skiing event.

In 2026, he won the 1.5km sprint at the Para Cross Country Skiing Sprint Vision Impaired Final of the 2026 Winter Paralympics, becoming the first openly gay male athlete to win a gold medal as an individual at any Winter Paralympics.

== Personal life ==
Adicoff is openly gay and has been involved with the LGBTQ athlete advocacy organization Out Athlete Fund.
