= Collin Cameron =

Canadian Canadian Para cross-country skier and biathlete (born 1988)

Personal information
- Born: 31 March 1988 (age 38) Barrie, Ontario, Canada
- Height: 1.65 m (5 ft 5 in)

Sport
- Country: Canada
- Sport: Para Nordic skiing (Para cross-country skiing and Para biathlon)
- Disability class: LW11.5

Achievements and titles
- Paralympic finals: 3 bronze 2018. 3 bronze 2022
- World finals: 2 gold. 4 silver.
- National finals: 5 gold. 1 silver.
- Highest world ranking: cross country crystal globe 2023.
Medal record
Representing Canada
Men's Para cross-country skiing
Paralympic Games
Bronze medal – third place	2022 Beijing	18 km sitting
Bronze medal – third place	2022 Beijing	1.5 km sprint sitting
Bronze medal – third place	2022 Beijing	4 × 2.5km mixed relay
World Championships
Silver medal – second place	2023 Östersund	18 km sitting
Silver medal – second place	2023 Östersund	10 km sitting
Men's Para biathlon
World Championships
Gold medal – first place	2023 Östersund	7.5 km sitting

Collin Cameron (born 31 March 1988 in Barrie, Ontario) is a Canadian Para cross-country skier and biathlete who won three bronze medals at the 2018 Winter Paralympics. and two silver and a gold medal at the 2019 Para Nordic World Championships in Prince George, BC, CAN. He also participated at the 2022 Winter Paralympics, winning two bronze medals in the 18 kilometre long-distance event, and the 1.5 kilometre sprint event.
