= IPC World Championships =

There are a number of IPC World Championships supervised and co-ordinated by the International Paralympic Committee (IPC):

- IPC Alpine Skiing World Championships
- IPC Athletics World Championships
- IPC Biathlon and Cross-Country Skiing World Championships
- IPC Cycling World Championships
- IPC Ice Sledge Hockey World Championships
- IPC Powerlifting World Championships
- IPC Shooting World Championships
- IPC Swimming World Championships
- IPC Wheelchair Dance Sport World Championships
