= Zheng Peng =

Chinese Para cross-country skier (born 1992)

Personal information
- Nationality: Chinese
- Born: 21 October 1992 (age 33)

Sport
- Country: China
- Sport: Para cross-country skiing
- Disability class: LW11
Medal record
Men's Para cross-country skiing
Representing China
Paralympic Games
Gold medal – first place	2022 Beijing	18 km sitting
Gold medal – first place	2022 Beijing	1.5 km sprint sitting
Silver medal – second place	2022 Beijing	10 km sitting
Silver medal – second place	2022 Beijing	4 × 2.5 km mixed relay
Bronze medal – third place	2026 Milano Cortina	10 km sitting
Bronze medal – third place	2026 Milano Cortina	4 × 2.5 km mixed relay

Zheng Peng (born 21 October 1992) is a Chinese Para cross-country skier. He is a three-time Paralympian.

== Career ==
Zheng Peng represented China at the 2018 Winter Paralympics and finished in fourth place in the 15 kilometre sitting event. He again represented China at the 2022 Winter Paralympics and won the gold medals in the 18 kilometre long-distance event and 1.5 kilometre sprint event, and silver medals in the 10 kilometre and 4 × 2.5 kilometre mixed relay.
