= Brazil at the 2022 Winter Paralympics =

- Flag of Brazil
- IPC code: BRA
- NPC: Brazilian Paralympic Committee
- Website: www.cpb.org.br

in Beijing, China 4 March 2022 – 13 March 2022
- Competitors: 6 (5 on foot, 1 on wheelchair) in 2 sports
- Flag bearers (opening): Aline Rocha; Cristian Ribera
- Flag bearer (closing): André Barbieri
- Medals: Gold 0 Silver 0 Bronze 0 Total 0

Winter Paralympics appearances (overview)
- 2014; 2018; 2022; 2026

Brazil competed at the 2022 Winter Paralympics in Beijing, China which took place between 4–13 March 2022.

== Competitors ==
The following is the list of number of competitors participating at the Games per sport/discipline.

Sport	Men	Women	Total
Cross-country skiing	4	1	5
Snowboarding	1	0	1
Total	5	1	6

== Cross-country skiing ==
Cristian Ribera was among the cross-country skiers to compete at the 2022 Winter Paralympics.

Men

Athlete	Event	Qualification		Semifinal		Final	
Athlete	Event	Result	Rank	Result	Rank	Result	Rank
Robelson Lula	1.5 km sprint, sitting	2:36.77	21	Did not advance			
Robelson Lula	10 km, sitting	—N/a				38:20.3	20
Robelson Lula	18 km classical, sitting	—N/a				57:17.7	20
Cristian Ribera	1.5 km sprint, sitting	2:23.48	5 Q	2:59.8	5	Did not advance	
Cristian Ribera	10 km, sitting	—N/a				36:09.5	13
Cristian Ribera	18 km classical, sitting	—N/a				52:29.1	14
Guilherme Rocha	1.5 km sprint, sitting	2:34.19	18	Did not advance			
Guilherme Rocha	10 km, sitting	—N/a				37:23.6	18
Guilherme Rocha	18 km classical, sitting	—N/a				55:18.9	19
Wesley dos Santos	1.5 km sprint, sitting	2:39.14	24	Did not advance			
Wesley dos Santos	10 km, sitting	—N/a				41:12.5	27
Wesley dos Santos	18 km classical, sitting	—N/a				58:23.5	23

Women

Athlete	Event	Qualification		Semifinal		Final	
Athlete	Event	Result	Rank	Result	Rank	Result	Rank
Aline Rocha	1.5 km sprint, sitting	2:59.49	9 Q	3:55.2	5	Did not advance	
Aline Rocha	7.5 km, sitting	—N/a				30:07.6	10
Aline Rocha	15 km, sitting	—N/a				50:45.7	7

Relay

Athletes	Event	Final	
Athletes	Event	Time	Rank
Robelson Lula; Cristian Ribera; Guilherme Rocha; Aline Rocha	4 x 2.5 km mixed relay	34:10.8	8

== Snowboarding ==
One snowboarder competed in snowboarding.

Banked slalom

Athlete	Event	Run 1	Run 2	Best	Rank
André Barbieri	Men's SB-LL1	1:43.86	1:22.18	1:22.18	13

Snowboard cross

Athlete	Event	Qualification				Quarterfinal	Semifinal	Final	
Athlete	Event	Run 1	Run 2	Best	Rank	Position	Position	Position	Rank
André Barbieri	Men's SB-LL1	1:18.30	1:19.48	1:18.30	13 Q	4	Did not advance		

Qualification legend: Q - Qualify to next round; FA - Qualify to medal final; FB - Qualify to consolation final

== See also ==
- Brazil at the Paralympics
- Brazil at the 2022 Winter Olympics
