= Mao Zhongwu =

Chinese Para cross country skier and Para biathlete (born 1986)

Personal information
- Born: 7 August 1986 (age 40)

Sport
- Country: China
- Sport: Para cross-country skiing
- Disability class: LW11
Medal record
Representing China
Men's Para cross-country skiing
Paralympic Games
Gold medal – first place	2022 Beijing	10 free km sitting
Silver medal – second place	2022 Beijing	18 km sitting
Silver medal – second place	2022 Beijing	1.5 km sprint sitting
Silver medal – second place	2026 Milano Cortina	10 km sitting
Silver medal – second place	2026 Milano Cortina	20 km sitting
Bronze medal – third place	2026 Milano Cortina	4 × 2.5 km mixed relay
Men's Para biathlon
Paralympic Games
Silver medal – second place	2026 Milano Cortina	12.5 km sitting

Mao Zhongwu (born 7 August 1986) is a Chinese Para cross-country skier and Para biathlete.

== Career ==
He competed in the Cross-country skiing at the 2022 Winter Paralympics competition, winning the gold medal in the 10 kilometre free, and silver medals in the 18 kilometre long-distance event and the 1.5 kilometre sprint event.
