= Håkon Olsrud =

Norwegian Paralympic cross-country skier

Personal information
- Full name: Håkon Grønsveen Olsrud
- Nationality: Norwegian
- Born: 11 April 1985 (age 41)

Sport
- Country: Norway
- Sport: Paralympic cross-country skiing
- Disability class: LW6/8
Medal record
Men's para cross-country skiing
Representing Norway
Winter Paralympics
Silver medal – second place	2018 Pyeongchang	4 x 2.5km relay open
Bronze medal – third place	2018 Pyeongchang	20km free standing

Håkon Grønsveen Olsrud (born 11 April 1985) is a Norwegian Paralympic cross-country skier. He has competed at the Winter Paralympics in 2014 and in 2018. Håkon Olsrud claimed his first Paralympic medal, a bronze medal in the men's 20km free standing cross-country skiing event during the 2018 Winter Paralympics.
