= Qiu Mingyang =

Chinese paralympic cross country skier

Personal information
- Nationality: Chinese

Sport
- Country: China
- Disability class: LW5/7
Medal record
Men's Paralympic cross-country skiing
Representing China
Winter Paralympics
Bronze medal – third place	2022 Beijing	20km classical visually impaired

Qiu Mingyang is a Chinese paralympic cross country skier. He competed in the 20 kilometre classical event at the 2022 Winter Paralympics, winning the bronze medal.
