= Yu Shuang =

Chinese Para biathlete and cross-country skier (born 2003)

Personal information
- Born: 29 August 2003 (age 23) Dazhou, China

Sport
- Country: China
- Sport: Para Nordic skiing (Para cross-country skiing and Para biathlon)
- Disability: Visually impaired
- Disability class: NS3
Medal record
Representing China
Paralympic Games
Men's Para biathlon
Gold medal – first place	2026 Milano Cortina	Sprint pursuit
Silver medal – second place	2026 Milano Cortina	Sprint
Bronze medal – third place	2022 Beijing	12.5 km
Men's Para cross-country skiing
Gold medal – first place	2026 Milano Cortina	4 × 2.5 km relay open

Yu Shuang (born 29 August 2003) is a Chinese visually impaired Para biathlete and cross-country skier. He represented China at the 2022 and 2026 Winter Paralympics.

== Career ==
Yu represented China at the 2022 Winter Paralympics and won a bronze medal in the men's 12.5 kilometres visually impaired event.
