= Witold Skupień =

Polish Para cross-country skier and biathlete (born 1989)

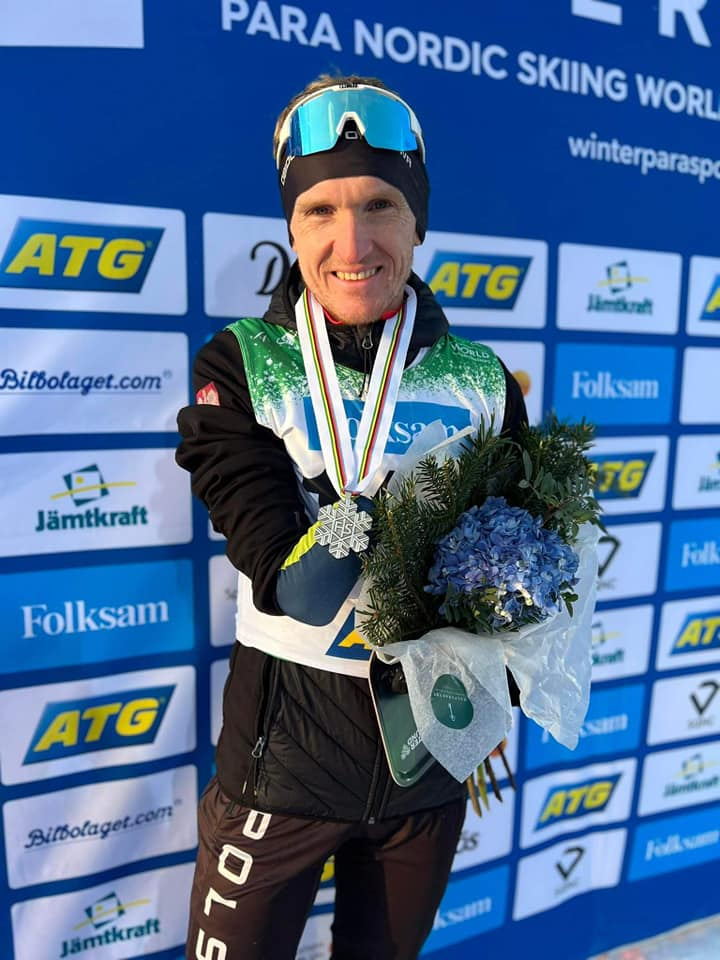

Personal information
- Born: 7 June 1989 (age 37) Nowy Targ, Poland

Sport
- Country: Poland
- Sport: Para cross-country skiing; Para biathlon
- Disability class: LW5/7
Medal record
Men's Para cross-country skiing
Representing Poland
World Championships
Gold medal – first place	2023 Östersund	18km individual
Silver medal – second place	2021 Lillehammer	12.5km
Silver medal – second place	2023 Östersund	10km freestyle

Witold Skupień (born 7 June 1989) is a Polish Para cross-country skier and biathlete.

== Career ==
Skupień competed at the 2026 Winter Paralympics with his best finish being fifth place in the 20 kilometre classical event. He then competed at the 2023 World Para Nordic Skiing Championships and won a gold medal in the 18 kilometre individual event, and a silver medal in the 10 kilometre freestyle event.

In February 2026, he was selected to represent Poland at the 2026 Winter Paralympics.
