= Iaroslav Reshetynskyi =

Ukrainian biathlete and cross-country skier (born 1992)

Personal information
- Nationality: Ukraine
- Born: 24 September 1992 (age 34) Kyiv, Ukraine

Sport
- Sport: Para biathlon; para cross-country skiing
Medal record
Men's para biathlon
Winter Paralympics
| Silver medal – second place | 2026 Milano Cortina | Sprint |
World Championships
| Silver medal – second place | 2024 Prince George | Individual |
| Silver medal – second place | 2024 Prince George | Sprint pursuit |
| Silver medal – second place | 2025 Pokljuka | Individual |
| Silver medal – second place | 2025 Pokljuka | Sprint |
| Bronze medal – third place | 2024 Prince George | Sprint |
World Championships
Men's para cross-country skiing
| Bronze medal – third place | 2015 Cable | Open relay |
| Bronze medal – third place | 2019 Prince George | Open relay |
| Bronze medal – third place | 2023 Östersund | Open relay |

Iaroslav Reshetynskyi (born 24 September 1992) is a Ukrainian visually impaired para biathlete and cross-country skier.

== Career ==
Reshetynskyi at the 2014 Winter Paralympics where he competed in five events. During the 2017–18 season, he won a bronze medal at the World Cup in Vuokatti. He then competed at the 2018 Winter Paralympics, where he again competed in five events, with his best result being fourth place in 7.5 kilometres event. At the 2019 World Para Nordic Skiing Championships, he won a bronze medal in the open relay.

Reshetynskyi competed in the 2022 Winter Paralympics, with his best results in fourth place at the 10 kilometres and 12.5 kilometre events.

At the 2024 Para Biathlon World Championships, Reshetynskyi won three medals, two of which resulted in silver and one in bronze. In February 2025, at the Para Biathlon World Championships, Reshetynskyi won the silver medal in the individual and sprint events.

Reshetynskyi competed in the 2026 Winter Paralympics, where he won the silver medal in the men's sprint.
