= Liu Zixu =

Chinese Para biathlete and cross-country skier (born 1997)

Personal information
- Born: 27 August 1997 (age 29) Shaanxi, China

Sport
- Country: China
- Sport: Para Nordic skiing (Para cross-country skiing and Para biathlon)
- Disability class: LW12
Medal record
Representing China
Men's Para biathlon
Paralympic Games
Gold medal – first place	2022 Beijing	6 km sitting
Gold medal – first place	2026 Milano Cortina	12.5 km sitting
Bronze medal – third place	2022 Beijing	12.5 km sitting
Bronze medal – third place	2026 Milano Cortina	Sprint sitting
Bronze medal – third place	2026 Milano Cortina	Sprint pursuit sitting
Men's Para cross-country skiing
Paralympic Games
Gold medal – first place	2026 Milano Cortina	Sprint sitting

Liu Zixu (born 27 August 1997) is a Chinese Para biathlete and cross-country skier who competed at the 2022 and 2026 Winter Paralympics.

== Career ==
Liu represented China at the 2022 Winter Paralympics and won a gold medal in the men's 6 kilometres sitting event. This was China's first gold medal at the 2022 Winter Paralympics, and their second-ever Winter Paralympics gold. He also won a bronze medal in the men's 12.5 kilometres event.
