= Dmytro Suiarko =

Ukrainian Para Nordic skier (born 1996)

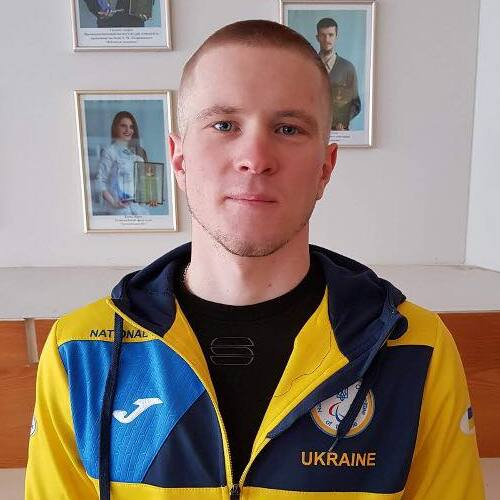

Personal information
- Nationality: Ukrainian
- Born: 22 October 1996 (age 29)

Sport
- Country: Ukraine
- Sport: Para Nordic skiing (Para cross-country skiing and Para biathlon)
- Disability class: B2
Medal record
Representing Ukraine
Winter Paralympics
Men's Para biathlon
Bronze medal – third place	2022 Beijing	6 km visually impaired
Bronze medal – third place	2022 Beijing	10 km visually impaired
Bronze medal – third place	2026 Milano Cortina	12.5 km visually impaired
Men's Para cross-country skiing
Gold medal – first place	2022 Beijing	4 × 2.5 km open relay
Bronze medal – third place	2022 Beijing	12.5 km visually impaired

Dmytro Suiarko (Ukrainian: Дмитро Олегович Суярко; born 22 October 1996) is a Ukrainian visually impaired Para cross-country skier and biathlete.

== Career ==
He made his Paralympic debut for Ukraine during the 2018 Winter Paralympics. He again represented Ukraine at the 2022 Winter Paralympics and won a gold medal in the 4 × 2.5 kilometre open relay and bronze medals in the 6 kilometres and 10 kilometres biathlon events and the 12.5 kilometres cross-country skiing event.

In February 2026, he was selected to represent Ukraine at the 2026 Winter Paralympics.

== Personal life ==
On 7 March 2022, Suiarko's house was bombed and destroyed during the Russian invasion of Ukraine.

== Recognition ==
- Forbes 30 Under 30 (Europe, Sports & Games) (2022)
