= Anthony Chalençon =

French Para alpine skier, cross-country skier and biathlete (born 1990)

Personal information
- Nationality: French
- Born: 13 August 1990 (age 36) Évian-les-Bains, France
- Height: 1.74 m (5 ft 9 in)

Sport
- Country: France
- Sport: Para Nordic skiing (Para cross-country skiing and Para biathlon)
- Disability: Visually impaired
- Disability class: NS1
- Partner: Simon Valverde (guide)
Medal record
Representing France
Paralympic Games
Men's Para cross-country skiing
Gold medal – first place	2018 Pyeongchang	4 × 2.5 km relay open
Silver medal – second place	2022 Beijing	4 × 2.5 km relay open
Bronze medal – third place	2026 Milano Cortina	20 km freestyle visually impaired
Men's Para biathlon
Bronze medal – third place	2018 Pyeongchang	15 km visually impaired
World Championships
Men's Para cross-country skiing
Gold medal – first place	2015 Cable	4 x 2.5 km relay open
Gold medal – first place	2017 Finsterau	4 x 2.5 km relay open
Bronze medal – third place	2019 Prince George	10 km Middle
Men's Para biathlon
Bronze medal – third place	2017 Finsterau	7.5 km Sprint
Bronze medal – third place	2019 Prince George	12.5 km Middle
Silver medal – second place	2019 Prince George	4 x 2.5 km relay open

Anthony Chalençon (born 13 August 1990) is a French male visually impaired Para cross-country skier and biathlete who also formerly competed as a Para alpine skier. He switched from alpine skiing to take up Paralympic Nordic skiing after a disastrous start to his Paralympic career as an alpine skier in 2010. Anthony Chalençon clinched his first Paralympic medals after clinching a bronze medal in the 15km visually impaired biathlon event and gold in the Open Relay during the 2018 Winter Paralympics.

== Career ==
Anthony Chalençon took up Para Nordic skiing in late 2011. With Benjamin Daviet and Thomas Clarion he won two world titles in the relay in 2015 and 2017.

He competed for France at the 2018 Winter Paralympics. He claimed his first Paralympic medal at the Pyeongchang Winter Paralympic Games, which was a bronze in the biathlon event.

He claimed his first Paralympic gold medal during the 2018 Winter Paralympics after winning the men's 4 x 2.5 km relay open team event for France along with other members including Benjamin Daviet and Thomas Clarion.
