= Sin Eui-hyun =

South Korean Para cross-country skier and biathlete (born 1980)

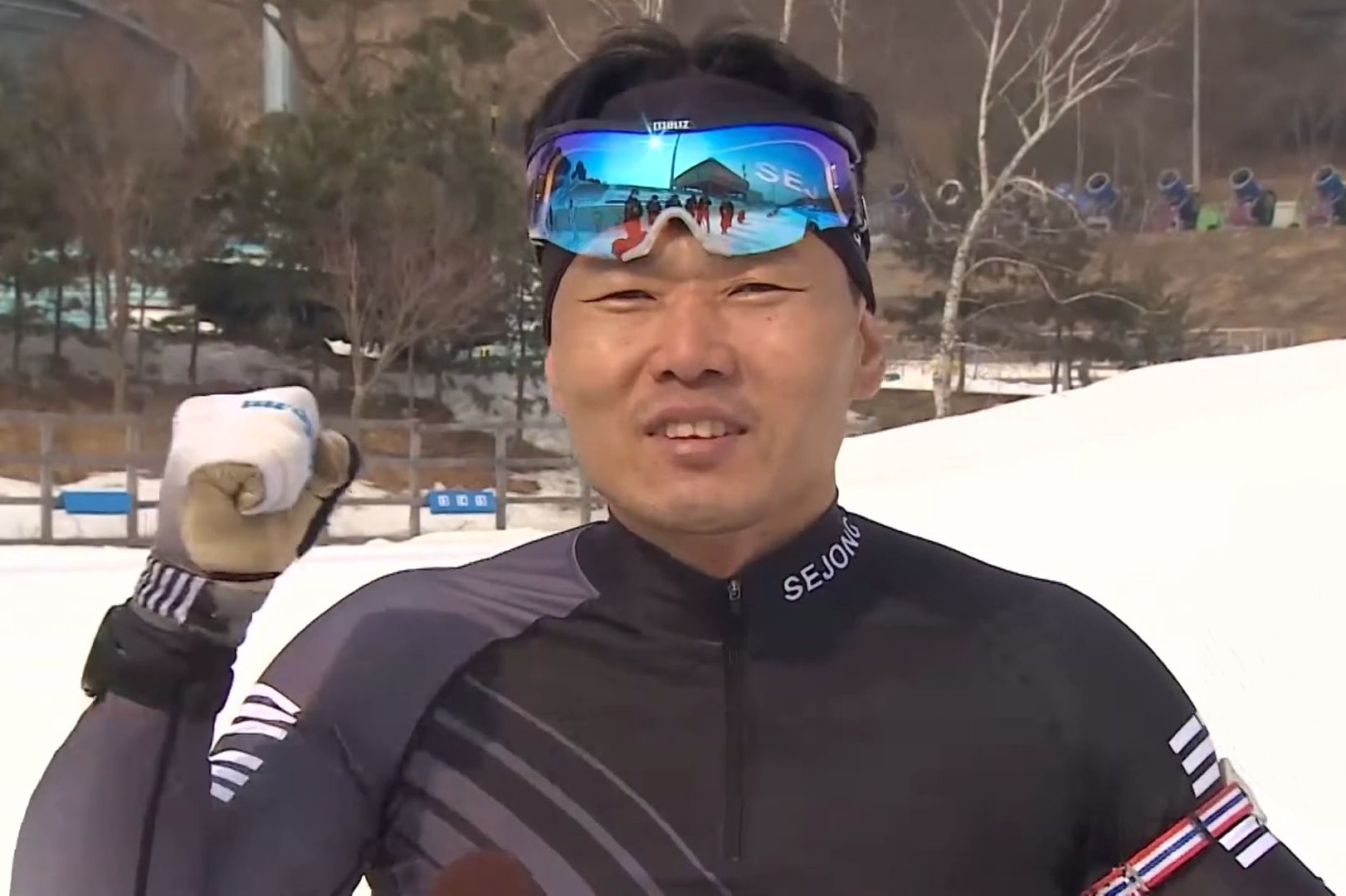

Personal information
- Nationality: South Korean
- Born: April 1, 1980 (age 46) Gongju, South Chungcheong Province

Sport
- Country: South Korea
- Sport: Para Nordic skiing (Para cross-country skiing and Para biathlon)
- Disability class: LW12
Medal record
Men's Para cross-country skiing
Representing South Korea
Winter Paralympics
Gold medal – first place	Pyeongchang 2018	7.5km classical sitting
Bronze medal – third place	Pyeongchang 2018	15km sitting

Korean name
- Hangul: 신의현
- Hanja: 申義鉉
- RR: Sin Uihyeon
- MR: Sin Ŭihyŏn

Sin Eui-hyun (Korean: 신의현; born April 1, 1980) is a South Korean male Para cross-country skier and biathlete. He is the first South Korean Paralympic competitor to clinch a gold medal in Winter Paralympics as he achieved it in his home nation at the 2018 Winter Paralympics.

== Career ==
He made his Paralympic debut for South Korea during the 2018 Winter Paralympics and claimed the nation's first Paralympic medal during the 2018 Winter Paralympics after clinching a bronze medal in the men's 20km sitting cross-country skiing event.

Sin Eui-hyun created history after claiming South Korea's first ever gold medal in their Winter Paralympics history, during the 2018 Winter Paralympics after emerging as the winner of the men's 7.5km classical sitting cross-country skiing event.

He was also selected as the flagbearer for South Korea during the 2018 Winter Paralympics opening ceremony as he represented the home nation, South Korea in the 2018 Winter Paralympics Parade of Nations.

In 2022, he won the silver medal in the men's long-distance sitting cross-country skiing event at the 2021 World Para Snow Sports Championships held in Lillehammer, Norway.
