= Cristian Ribera =

Brazilian Para cross-country skier (born 2002)

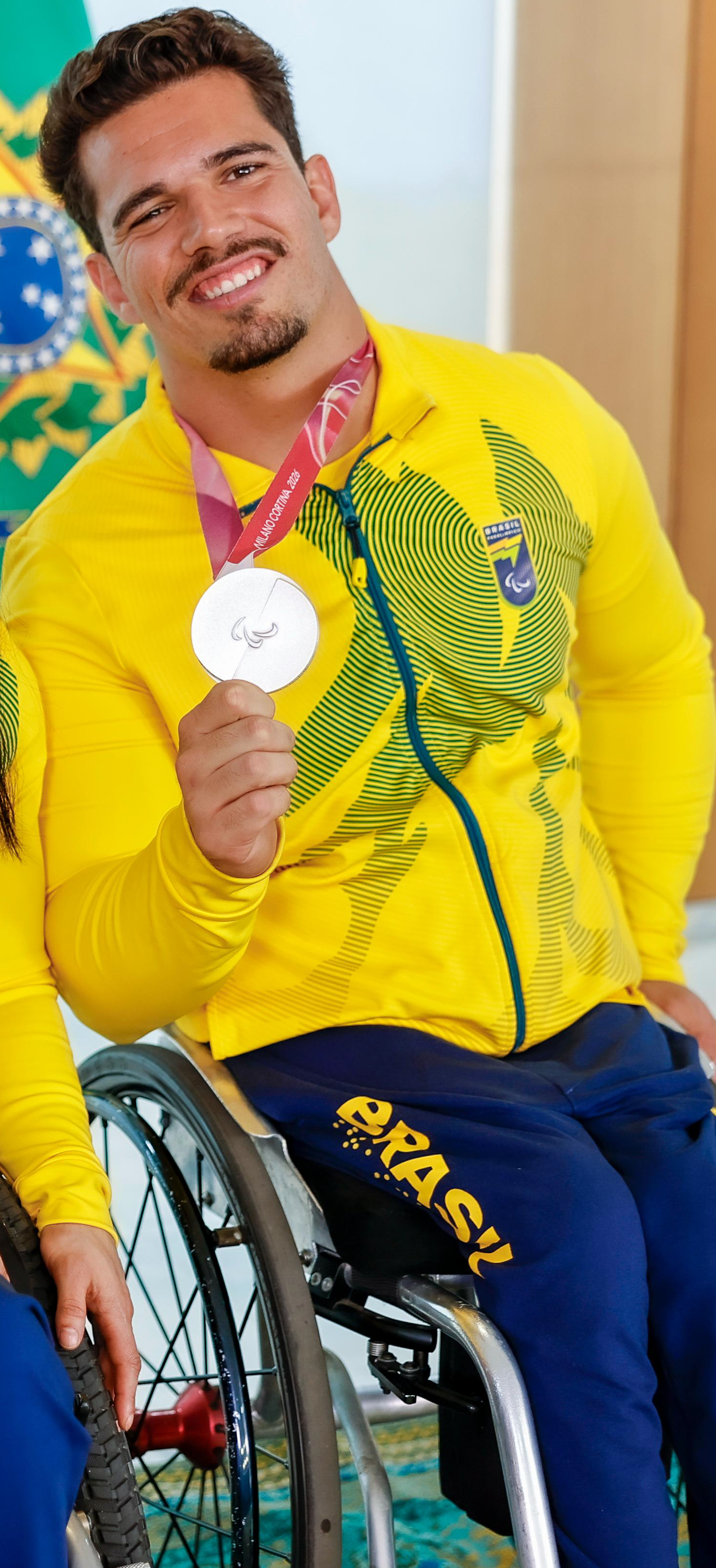
- Ribeira in 2026 with his silver medal won at the 2026 Winter Paralympic Games

Personal information
- Full name: Cristian Westemaier Ribera
- Born: 13 November 2002 (age 23) Cerejeiras, Rondônia, Brazil

Sport
- Country: Brazil
- Sport: Para cross-country skiing
- Disability class: LW11
Medal record
Men's Para cross-country skiing
Representing Brazil
Event	1st	2nd	3rd
Paralympic Games	0	1	0
World Championships	1	1	3
Total	1	2	3
Paralympic Games
Silver medal – second place	2026 Milano Cortina	Sprint sitting
World Para Nordic Skiing Championships
Gold medal – first place	2025 Trondheim	Sprint sitting
Silver medal – second place	2021 Lillehammer	Sprint sitting
Bronze medal – third place	2023 Östersund	Sprint sitting
Bronze medal – third place	2025 Toblach	20km Start Sitting Free
Bronze medal – third place	2025 Toblach	10km Start Sitting Classic

Cristian Westemaier Ribera (born 13 November 2002) is a Brazilian Para cross-country skier. At the 2021 World Para Snow Sports Championships, he won the silver medal in the men's sprint sitting event. At the 2026 Winter Paralympics, he also won the silver medal in the men's sprint sitting event, becoming the first Brazilian in history to win a medal of any kind at the Winter Paralympics.

== Background ==
Ribera was born with arthrogryposis multiplex congenita, which causes bent and stiff joints in various parts of the body. He has undergone 21 leg surgeries to improve his condition. He started playing sports when he was four years old, and he started parallel skiing in 2015.

== Career ==
Ribera made his international debut in the World Cup in 2017–18, and came in seventh place in the class for sitting athletes. He participated in the 2018 Winter Paralympics, where he was the youngest participant at 15 years old, finishing in sixth place in the 15 km event, ninth place and 15th place in the 7.5 km and sprint events respectively. In addition, he participated in the mixed relay, where Brazil finished in 13th place.

Ribera came in 13th place in the World Cup in 2018–19, and he came in second place in the World Cup in 2019–20, only beaten by Ivan Golubkov. The following season, he finished in 13th place in the World Cup in 2020–21.

At the 2021 World Para Snow Sports Championships held in Lillehammer, Norway, Ribera won his first medal ever in World Championships – a silver medal in the sprint event. In the 18 km event, he finished in sixth place, and in the 10 km event, he finished in eighth place.

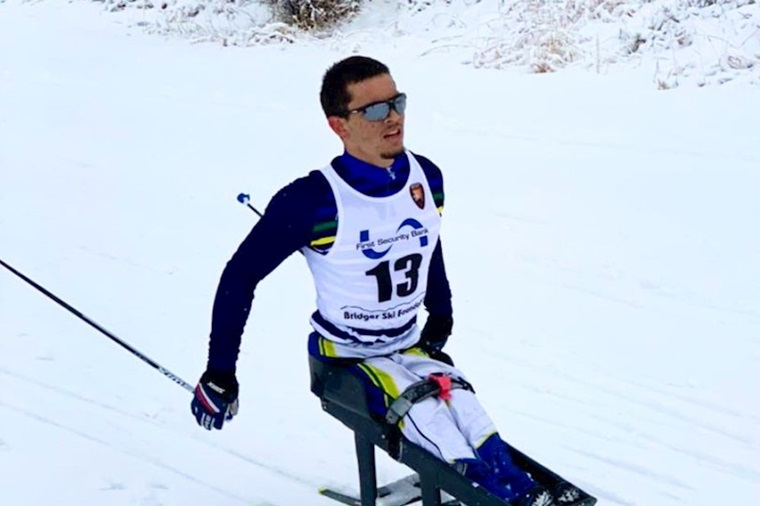
Cristian Ribera in 2021

At the 2023 World Para Nordic Skiing Championships held in Östersund, Sweden, Ribera won the bronze medal in the sprint event.

Ribera won 3 medals at the FIS Nordic World Ski Championships 2025. His first gold medal ever was at the sprint in Trondheim, Norway. He also won two bronze medals in the events held in Toblach, Italy – in the 20km freestyle and the 10 km Classical. That month, Ribera earned the Men's Para cross-country Crystal Globe of the 2024/25 season – he became the first para-sportsman from Brazil and South America to win that title.

At the 2026 Winter Paralympics, Ribera also won the silver medal in the men's sprint sitting event, becoming the first Brazilian and Latin American in history to win a medal of any kind at the Winter Paralympics. He dominated much of the final of that event in that discipline, but was overtaken in the final stretch by China's Zixu Liu, who clocked a time of 2:28.9 to take the gold; the Brazilian finished in 2:29.6, closely followed by Kazakhstan's Yerbol Khamitov (2:29.9), who took the bronze.

== Sports career ==
=== Para cross-country skiing achievements ===
Below is a selection of Ribera's major career highlights.

- 2025 FIS World Ski Championships, Men's para cross-country – Sprint sitting, Trondheim, Norway – 1st
- 2024/25 FIS Para cross-country Crystal Globe – Men
- 2026 Winter Paralympics, Men's para cross-country – Sprint sitting, Milan and Cortina - Tesero, Italy – Silver medal
