= Daniel Cnossen =

American biathlete and cross-country skier

Personal information
- Born: May 17, 1980 (age 46) Topeka, Kansas, United States

Sport
- Country: United States
- Sport: Paralympic cross-country skiing and Paralympic biathlon
Medal record
Representing United States
Men's Biathlon
Winter Paralympics
Gold medal – first place	2018 Pyeongchang	7.5km sitting
Gold medal – first place	2022 Beijing	4 × 2.5 km mixed relay
Silver medal – second place	2018 Pyeongchang	12.5km sitting
Silver medal – second place	2018 Pyeongchang	15km sitting
Men's Cross-country skiing
Winter Paralympics
Silver medal – second place	2018 Pyeongchang	15km sitting
Silver medal – second place	2018 Pyeongchang	10km classical sitting
Bronze medal – third place	2018 Pyeongchang	1.5km sprint sitting

Daniel Cnossen (born May 17, 1980) is an American motivational speaker, and is a former Navy SEAL and paralympic athlete.

He competed as a biathlete and cross-country skier at the 2022 Winter Olympics. He won gold in the Biathlon at the 2018 Winter Paralympics – Men's 7.5 kilometres in the sitting division.

He is a native of Topeka, Kansas and a double amputee. He lost both legs, above the knees, in the War in Afghanistan due to an improvised explosive device. Cnossen also competed at the 2014 Winter Paralympics. Cnossen graduated from the United States Naval Academy in 2002. He earned a Master of Public Administration in 2016 from the John F. Kennedy School of Government at Harvard University and also a Master of Theological Studies in 2018 from the Divinity School.

== 2018 Winter Paralympics ==
Cnossen competed at the 2018 Winter Paralympics and created history in his second Paralympic appearance after claiming a gold medal in the men's 7.5km sitting biathlon event. In doing so he became the first American male and the second American ever to claim a gold medal in a biathlon event in either the Olympics or Paralympics after Kendall Gretsch, who achieved the feat at earlier at the same Paralympic games.

In addition to his gold medal achievement, Cnossen also clinched silver in the men's 15km cross-country skiing sitting, 12.5km biathlon sitting, 15km biathlon sitting and 10km cross-country classical sitting, and a bronze medal in the 1.1km cross-country sprint sitting. That year, Cnossen was named Male Paralympic Athlete of the Games as part of the 2018 Team USA Awards.
