= Nico Messinger =

German Para cross-country skier and biathlete (born 1994)

Personal information
- Born: 11 December 1994 (age 31) Freiburg im Breisgau, Germany

Sport
- Country: Germany
- Sport: Para cross-country skiing; Para biathlon
- Disability: Visually impaired
- Disability class: NS2
Medal record
Representing Germany
Men's Para cross-country skiing
World Championships
Gold medal – first place	2023 Östersund	Open relay
Silver medal – second place	2025 Toblach	Open relay
Silver medal – second place	2023 Östersund	Men´s Sprint - Free Style
Bronze medal – third place	2019 Prince George	Relay
Men's Para biathlon
World Championships
Silver medal – second place	2023 Östersund	Men´s 10km Middle
Bronze medal – third place	2023 Östersund	Men´s 7.5km Sprint

Nico Messinger (born 11 December 1994) is a German Para cross-country skier and biathlete.

== Background ==
Messinger suffers from an eye condition (Leber's congenital amaurosis) and is therefore classified in classification B2. Through a project at his school for the visually impaired, he first encountered cross-country skiing and biathlon in 2006. He has been actively involved in the sport since 2010. Robin Wunderle has been his guide skier for about three years. Messinger works as an automotive salesman.

== Career ==
In 2015, Messinger began competing in the Nordic World Ski Championships for athletes with disabilities and participated in both the 2018 Winter Paralympics in Pyeongchang, the 2022 Winter Paralympics in Beijing and the 2026 Winter Paralympics in Milan and Cortina d'Ampezzo. He competes in cross-country skiing and biathlon. Due to his visual impairment, he relies on Wunderle as his guide skier. His greatest successes to date were achieved at the 2023 World Championships in Östersund, Sweden. In cross-country skiing, he won gold in the open relay and silver in the sprint, while in biathlon, he won the 10 km and bronze in the 7.5 km. In the 2022/23 Para Biathlon World Cup overall standings, Messinger finished second.
