= Vasyl Kravchuk =

Ukrainian Para cross-country skier and biathlete (born 1996)

Personal information
- Nationality: Ukrainian
- Born: 26 July 1996 (age 30) Skole, Ukraine

Sport
- Country: Ukraine
- Sport: Para Nordic skiing (Para cross-country skiing and Para biathlon)
- Disability class: LW11
Medal record
Representing Ukraine
Winter Paralympics
Men's Para cross-country skiing
Gold medal – first place	2022 Beijing	4 × 2.5 km open relay
World Championships
Men's Para biathlon
Silver medal – second place	2021 Lillehammer	6 km sitting

Vasyl Kravchuk (born 26 July 1996) is a Ukrainian Para cross-country skier and biathlete.

== Career ==
He represented Ukraine at the 2022 Winter Paralympics and won a gold medal in the 4 × 2.5 kilometre open relay.
