= Yerbol Khamitov =

Kazakh Para Nordic skier (born 1997)

Personal information
- Nationality: Kazakh
- Born: 9 September 1997 (age 29)

Sport
- Country: Kazakhstan
- Sport: Para Nordic skiing (Para cross-country skiing and Para biathlon)
- Disability class: LW12
Medal record
Representing Kazakhstan
Men's Para biathlon
Paralympic Games
Gold medal – first place	2026 Milano Cortina	Sprint pursuit sitting
World Championships
Gold medal – first place	2025 Pokljuka	12.5 km sitting
Bronze medal – third place	2023 Östersund	7.5 km sitting
Bronze medal – third place	2023 Östersund	12.5 km sitting
Men's Para cross-country skiing
Winter Paralympics
Bronze medal – third place	2026 Milano Cortina	Sprint sitting
World Championships
Gold medal – first place	2023 Östersund	Sprint sitting
Bronze medal – third place	2025 Trondheim	Sprint sitting

Erbol Ğalymkereiūly Hamitov (Note: Often transliterated as Yerbol Galymkereyevich Khamitov through a Russified Romanization of Ербол Галымкереевич Хамитов.) (Kazakh: Ербол Ғалымкерейұлы Хамитов; born 9 September 1997) is a Kazakh Para cross-country skier and biathlete.

== Career ==
Khamitov represented Kazakhstan at the 2022 Winter Paralympics and served as a flag bearer during the 2022 Winter Paralympics Parade of Nations. He competed at the 2023 World Para Nordic Skiing Championships in para cross-country and won a gold medal in the sprint sitting event. He also competed in Para biathlon and won bronze medals in the 7.5 kilometre sprint and 12.5 kilometre sprint events.

In February 2025, he competed at the 2025 Para Biathlon World Championships and won a gold medal in the 12.5 kilometre individual sitting event. He became the first Para Biathlon World Champion from Kazakhstan. He then competed at the FIS Nordic World Ski Championships 2025 and won a bronze medal in the sprint sitting event with a time of 2:32.45. This marked the first time that Para cross-country athletes raced in the same stadium and on the same day as their able-bodied counterparts. During the 2025 Para Biathlon World Cup, he won the overall crystal globe, becoming the first Kazakh athlete to accomplish this.

In February 2026, he was selected to represent Kazakhstan at the 2026 Winter Paralympics. He won a gold medal in the sprint pursuit sitting event with a time of 9:39.0. This was Kazakhstan's first gold medal at the Winter Paralympic Games since 2018.

== Personal life ==
At 19 years old, Khamitov was shot in the knee and had his leg amputated.
