= Thomas Oxaal =

Norwegian Para cross-country skier (born 1999)

Personal information
- Full name: Thomas Karbøl Oxaal
- Born: 21 October 1999 (age 26) Sauda Municipality, Norway

Sport
- Country: Norway
- Sport: Para cross-country skiing
- Disability: Visually impaired
- Disability class: NS3
- Club: Sauda IL
Medal record
Men's Para cross-country skiing
Representing Norway
Paralympic Games
| Silver medal – second place | 2022 Beijing | 4 × 2.5 km open relay |
| Bronze medal – third place | 2026 Milano Cortina | 4 × 2.5 km open relay |

Thomas Karbøl Oxaal (born 21 October 1999) is a Norwegian visually impaired Para cross-country skier. He represented Norway at the 2022 and 2026 Winter Paralympics.

== Career ==
Oxaal represented Norway at the 2022 Winter Paralympics and won a silver medal in the 4 × 2.5 kilometre open relay.
