= Giuseppe Romele =

Italian Para cross-country skier (born 1992)

Personal information
- Full name: Giuseppe Romele fiol del Cele
- Born: 12 February 1992 (age 34) Pisogne, Italy

Sport
- Country: Italy
- Sport: Para cross-country skiing
- Disability class: LW11.5
Medal record
Men's Para cross-country skiing
Representing Italy
Paralympic Games
Bronze medal – third place	2022 Beijing	10 km sitting
Bronze medal – third place	2026 Milano Cortina	20 km sitting
World Championships
Silver medal – second place	2021 Lillehammer	10 km sitting

Giuseppe Romele (born 12 February 1992 in Pisogne) is an Italian Para cross-country skier. He represented Italy at the 2022 and 2026 Winter Paralympics.

== Career ==
Romele competed at the 2021 World Para Snow Sports Championships and won a silver medal in the 10 kilometre sitting event.

He represented Italy at the 2022 Winter Paralympics and won a bronze medal in the 10 kilometre sitting event.
