= World Para Nordic Skiing Championships =

International Nordic skiing competitions

The World Para Nordic Skiing Championships, known before 30 November 2016 as the IPC Biathlon and Cross-Country Skiing World Championships, along with the Winter Paralympic Games, are the most prestigious level of international competition in Paralympic Nordic skiing.

On 30 November 2016, the International Paralympic Committee, which serves as the international federation for 10 disability sports, including Nordic skiing, adopted the "World Para" brand for all 10 sports. The world championship events in all of these sports were immediately rebranded as "World Para" championships.

At the 53rd International Ski Congress in July 2022, the IPC transferred responsibility of para cross-country skiing to the International Ski and Snowboard Federation, and para biathlon to the International Biathlon Union.

== Championships ==
Edition	Year	City	Country	Date	Notes
1st	1974	Grand Bornand	France	–	Skiing World Championships - featured alpine (downhill) and Nordic (cross-country) skiing, held by the International Sports Organisation for Disabled (ISOD)
2nd	1982	Alpes Vaudoise	Switzerland	–	Winter World Championships
3rd	1986	Sälen	Sweden	–	
4th	1990	Jackson	United States	–	
5th	1996	Sunne	Sweden	–	
6th	2000	Crans-Montana	Switzerland	–	
7th	2003	Mitteltal-Obertal	Germany	–	
8th	2005	Fort Kent	United States	12 Mar – 20 Mar	
9th	2009	Vuokatti	Finland	23 Jan – 1 Feb	
10th	2011	Khanty-Mansiysk	Russia	31 Mar – 10 Apr	
11th	2013	Sollefteå	Sweden	25 February - 5 March	
12th	2015	Cable	United States	22 Jan – 1 Feb	
13th	2017	Finsterau	Germany	10 – 19 Feb	First World Championships under "World Para" branding.
13th	2019	Prince George	Canada	15 – 24 Feb	
14th	2021	Lillehammer	Norway	8 – 23 Jan	
15th	2023	Östersund	Sweden	21 – 29 Jan	

== See also ==
- Biathlon at the Winter Paralympics
- Cross-country skiing at the Winter Paralympics
- Biathlon World Championships
- FIS Nordic World Ski Championships
