= Para Nordic skiing =

Nordic skiing for people with disabilities

Para Nordic skiing is a Winter Paralympics sport consisting of Para biathlon and Para cross-country skiing. The sport is governed by the International Paralympic Committee, with its subcommittee for Nordic skiing known as World Para Nordic Skiing.

Paralympic Nordic skiing includes standing events, sitting events (for wheelchair users), and events for visually impaired athletes.

== Classifications ==
- Main : Para Nordic skiing classification

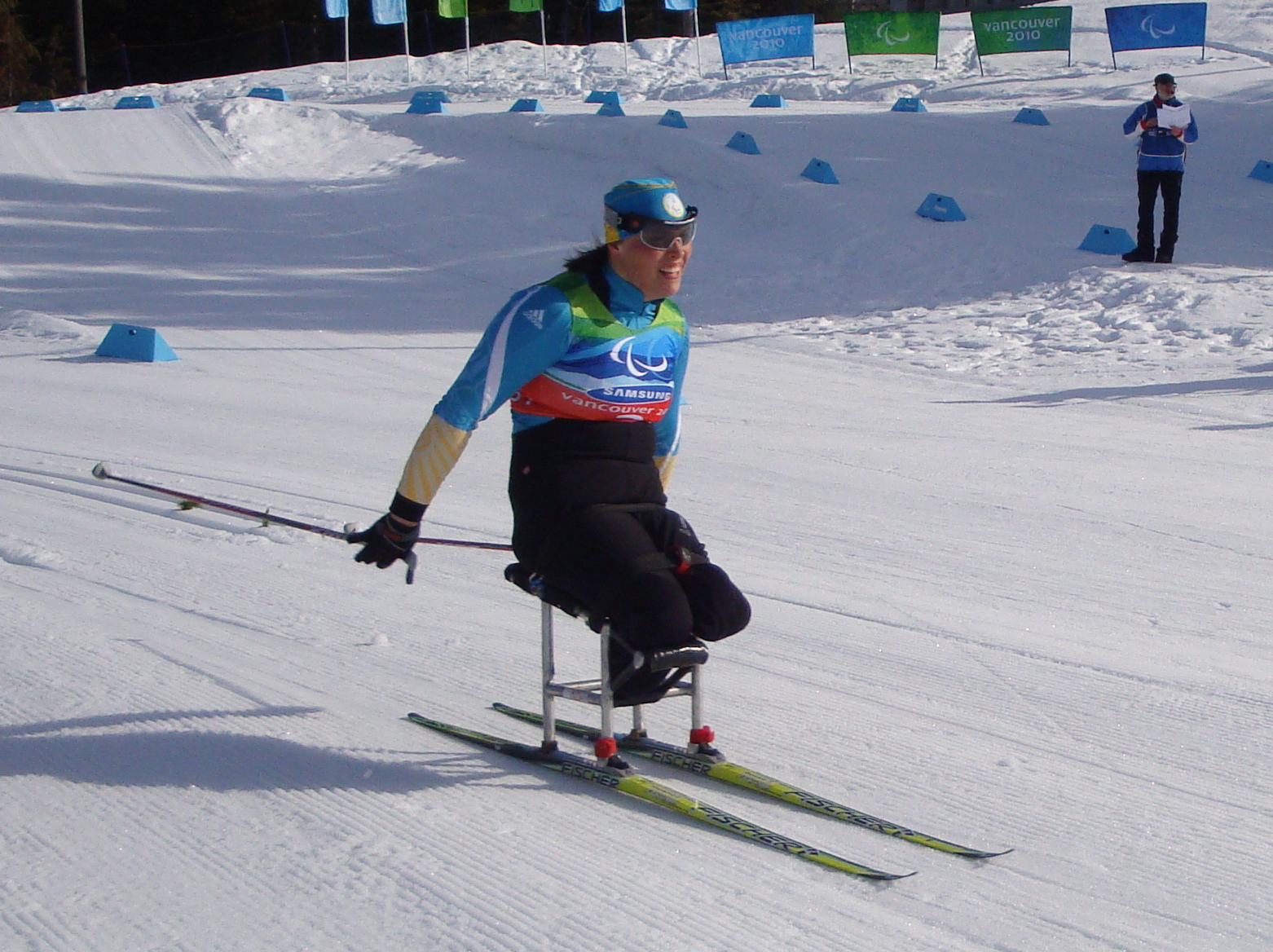
Olena Iurkovska of Ukraine competing in a cross-country sitting skier event at the 2010 Winter Paralympics.

The classifications used by the Canadian Paralympic Committee are:

Visually impaired

B1 - totally blind (no sight) B2 - partially sighted (visual acuity of 20/60 – limited sight) B3 - partially sighted (visual acuity above 20/60 to 6/60 –more sight than B2)

Standing Skiers

LW1 - double above-knee amputees LW2 - outrigger skiersLW3 - double below-knee amputees LW4 - skiers with prosthesisLW5/7- skiers without polesLW6/8 - skiers with one pole LW9/1 - disability of arm and leg (after amputation) LW9/2 - disability of arm and leg (cerebral palsy)

Sitting Skiers

LW10 - high degree of paraplegia, no muscles in lower body LW11 - lower degree of paraplegia, with muscles in lower body LW12/1 - lower degree of paraplegia, lower incomplete paralysis LW12/2 - double above-knee amputees

== Para equipment ==
Sitting skiers use Nordic sit-skis consisting of a seat on a frame mounted with bindings onto two cross-country skis. Paralympic-quality sit-skis are made of ultra-lightweight materials, and are custom made and fitted to each athlete.

Blind skiers use headsets and sound location boxes to communicate with their guide. Blind athletes in the biathlon use a rifle equipped with electro-acoustic glasses (an optronic system) which allows aiming by hearing. The closer the rifle points to the centre of the target, the higher the tone is. The different tones that occur when the rifle is moved allow the shooter to find the exact centre of the target.
