= Para biathlon =

Winter parasport

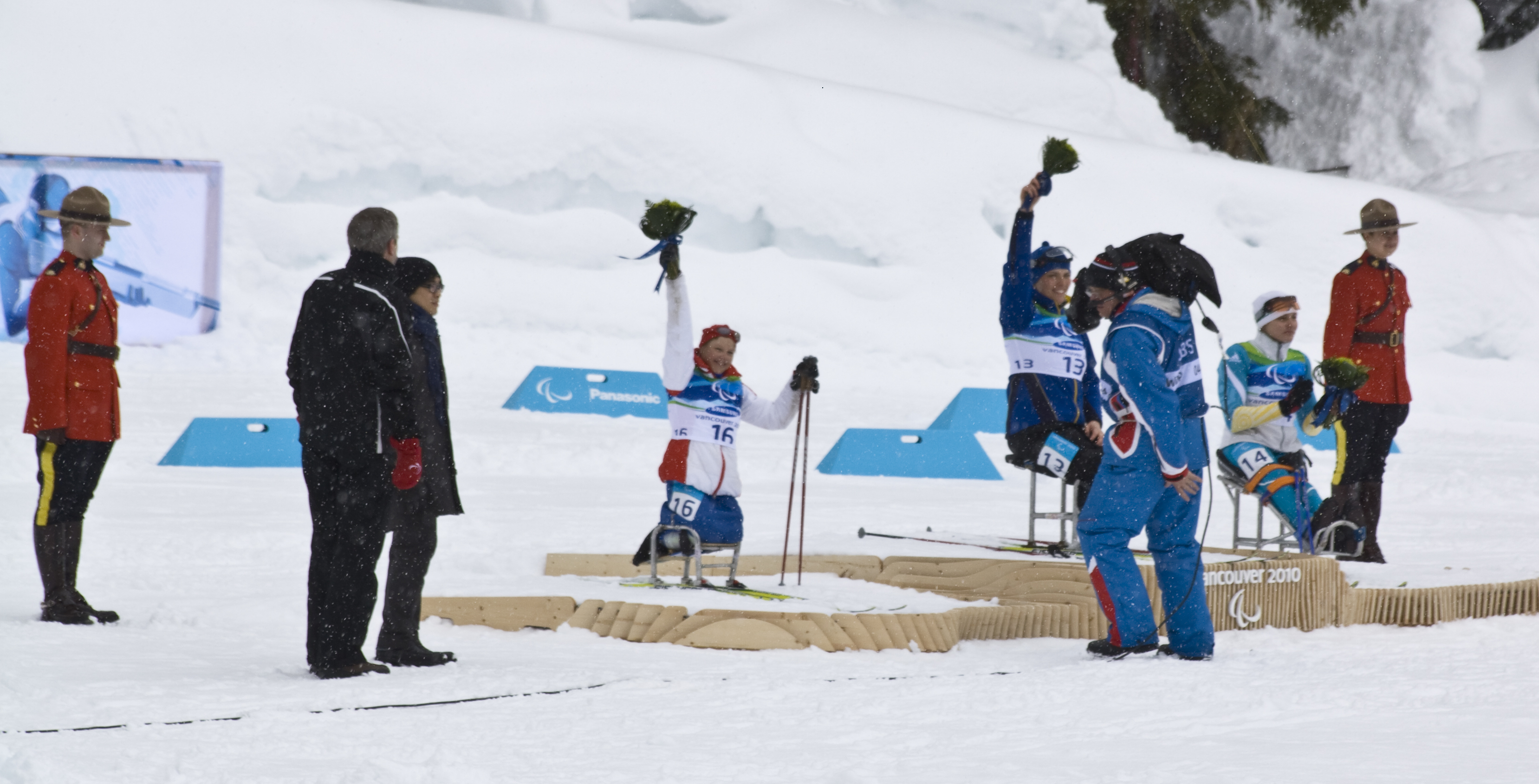
- Medal winners at the 2010 Paralympics
- Highest governing body: International Biathlon Union (IBU)

Characteristics
- Contact: No
- Team members: Individual or two-person teams
- Mixed-sex: Yes
- Type: Outdoor
- Equipment: Rifle; shooting target; sit-ski; skis; ski poles
- Venue: Cross-country skiing trail; shooting range

Presence
- World Championships: Since 2024
- Paralympic: Since 1988

Para biathlon is a winter sport that combines target shooting and cross-country skiing.The sport is an adaptation of biathlon for athletes with a disability. Para biathlon is one of two Nordic skiing disciplines in the Paralympic Winter Games, the other being Para cross-country skiing. It has been a Paralympic Sport since 1988 and since 2024, the sport is governed by the International Biathlon Union (IBU).

It is a race with contestants alternating between skiing through a cross-country trail and shooting at targets; missed shots result in a penalty of either extra time or extra distance.

== Classification ==
Para biathlon has three classes – vision impairment~~s~~, standing and sitting, across four events – sprint, middle distance, pursuit and individual competitions.As of 1 July 2024, athletes in specific sport classes are eligible to compete in Para biathlon events as follows:

- Vision impairment: NS1, NS2, NS3
- Standing events: LW2, LW3, LW4, LW5/7, LW6, LW8, LW9
- Sitting events: LW10, LW10.5, LW11, LW11.5, LW12

== Competitions ==
=== Para biathlon at the Paralympic Winter Games ===
Para biathlon has been a Paralympic sport since the 1988 Winter Paralympics for athletes with physical impairments, while athletes with vision impairments were included since the 1992 Winter Paralympics. The 1994 Winter Paralympics were the first time women's events were included.

Vitaliy Lukyanenko from Ukraine is the most decorated male Paralympic biathlete, with twelve medals including eight gold, while Verena Bentele from Germany is the most decorated female Paralympic biathlete, with six medals, including five gold. The most successful nation in Para biathlon is Ukraine with 95 medals (26 gold, 34 silver and 35 bronze). At the 2022 Beijing Paralympics, a total of 86 athletes across 14 nations competed in Para biathlon events. At the 2026 Milano Cortina Paralympic Games, the sport hosted 18 medal events from which China won 15 (eight gold, five silver and two bronze medals), followed by Ukraine with three gold, six silver and seven bronze medals.

=== IBU events ===
Para biathlon was governed by the IPC until July 2022, when it transferred governance of the sport jointly to the International Ski and Snowboard Federation (FIS) and the International Biathlon Union (IBU); since 2024, the IBU solely governs Para biathlon. Para biathlon was included as part of the World Para Nordic Skiing Championships in 2021 and 2023.

The 2024–2025 season, as the first fully managed by the IBU, features the Para Biathlon World Cup (PBWC) in several stages: the first in December in Vuokatti, Finland; the second in January in Val di Fiemme, Italy; and the World Cup Finals in March in Torsby, Sweden.

The Para Biathlon World Championships (PBWCH) have taken place since 2024, with the inaugural events held in Prince George, Canada. The 2024 World Championships consisted of four events: sprint (7.5 km), individual (12.5 km), spring pursuit, and team pursuit. The 2025 World Championships are scheduled to take place in Pokljuka, Slovenia.

== Equipment ==
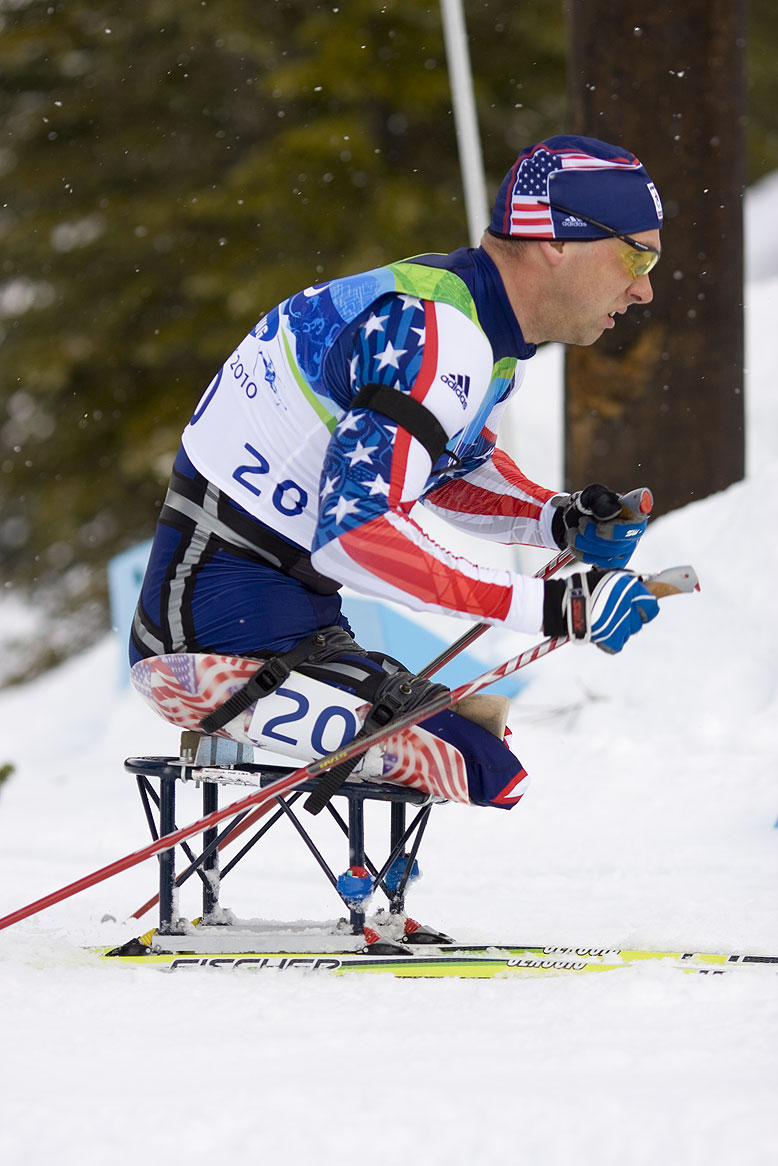
Andy Soule using a sit-ski at the 2010 Paralympics.

The following equipment is used in Para biathlon, which can differ depending on the classification of the athletes:

- Rifle: an air rifle or CO_{2} rifle with a five-round magazine. The International Shooting Sport Federation sets regulations for the rifles. Athletes with vision impairments use a rifle that uses sound to indicate to the athlete how accurate their aim is. The rifle uses the combination of an internal camera and a LED in the target to calculate the hit value .
- Shooting targets: black metal targets that are replaced by white discs when hit, located 10 m (33 ft) away from the competitors. The target's diameter is 21 mm (0.83 in) for athletes with vision impairments and 13 mm (0.51 in) for athletes with physical impairments.
- Sit-ski: only used by athletes with physical impairments for sitting down.
- Skis: classic skis are made of fibreglass and are usually 25–35 cm (9.8–13.8 in) taller than the skier. Meanwhile, freestyle skis are around 10–15 cm (3.9–5.9 in) shorter.
- Ski poles: fixed-length poles not longer than the skier's height.
