= Para cross-country skiing =

Cross-country skiing for disabled athletes

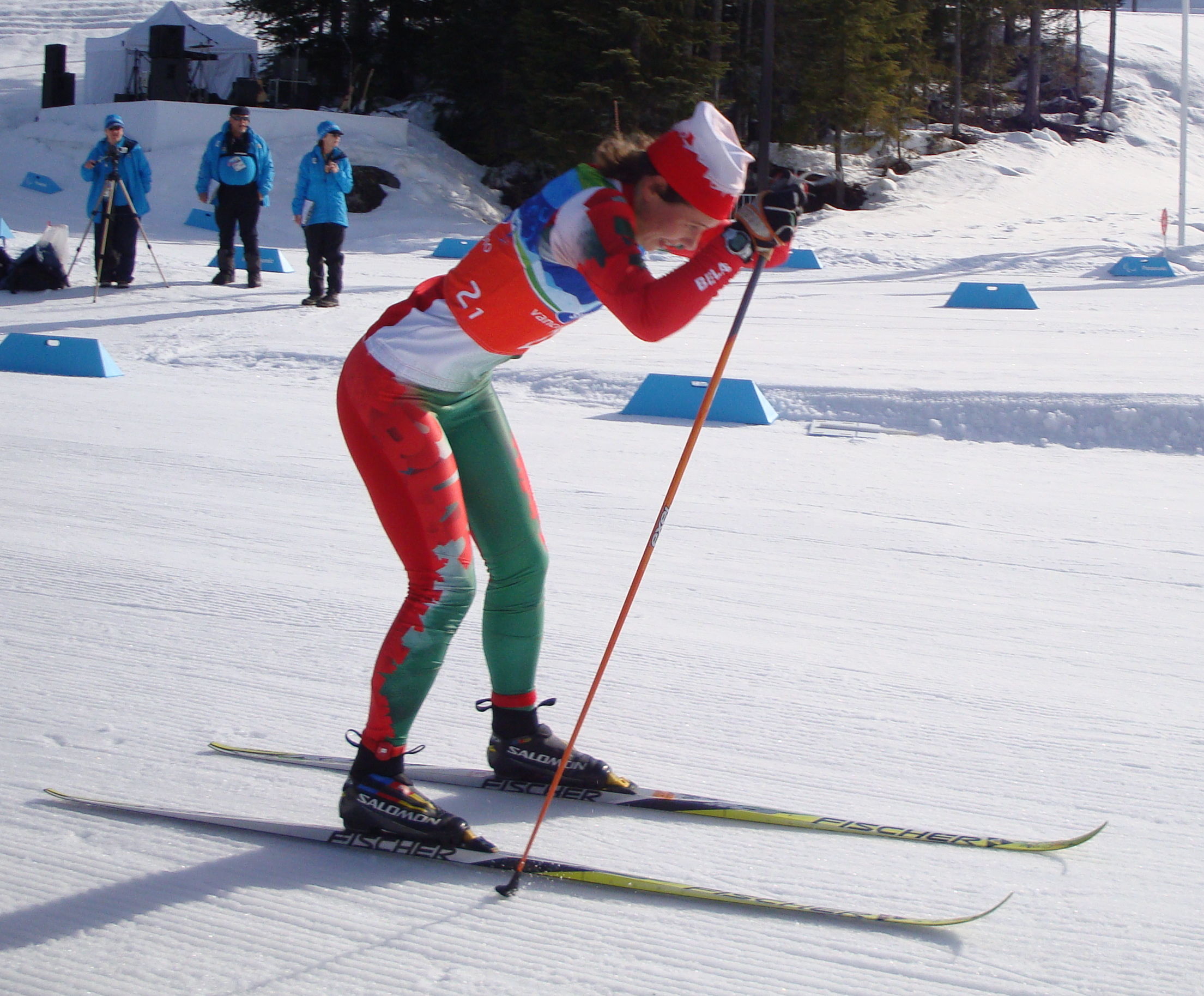
Larysa Varona of Belarus competing at the 2010 Winter Paralympics.

Para cross-country skiing is an adaptation of cross-country skiing for athletes with disabilities. It is one of two Nordic skiing disciplines in the Winter Paralympic Games; the other is biathlon. Competition is governed by the International Paralympic Committee.

== Classification of skiers and events ==
Para cross-country skiing includes standing events, sitting events (for wheelchair users), and events for visually impaired athletes under the rules of the International Paralympic Committee. These are divided into several categories for people who are missing limbs, have amputations, are blind, or have any other physical disability, to continue their sport. The classifications are for:

- Standing skiers with arm impairments, leg impairments or with both arm and leg impairments.
- Sit-Skiers, all with leg impairments, but with varying degrees of torso control.
- Skiers with visual impairment including blindness, low visual acuity, and limited field of vision.

Standing skiers use the two basic techniques in cross-country: classic-style, where the skis move parallel to each other through tracks in the snow, and the free-style or skate skiing where skiers propel themselves in a manner similar to speed skating, pushing off with the edge of their skis on smoothly groomed firm surfaces. Sit-skiers ride on sleds with skis designed for classic style tracks, propelling themselves with poles. Skiers compete in men’s and women’s individual events over short, middle and long distances ranging from 2.5 kilometres to 20 kilometres based on the type of event. Standing skiers compete in events of varying lengths—sprint (ca. 1,200 m), middle (10 km, men and 5 km, women) and long (20 km, men and 15 km, women). Sit-skiers compete in events of shorter lengths—sprint (ca. 800 m), middle (10 km, men and 5 km, women) and long (15 km, men and 12 km, women).

International Paralympic Committee events use one of three available start formats: individual timed starts, pursuit with multiple starters, and relay with successive competitors. Relay races may have competitors with a combination of disabilities, each of whom is assigned a handicap according to a "Nordic Percentage System." The percentage is applied to each skier’s final time and the skier with the lowest calculated time is the winner.

== Equipment ==
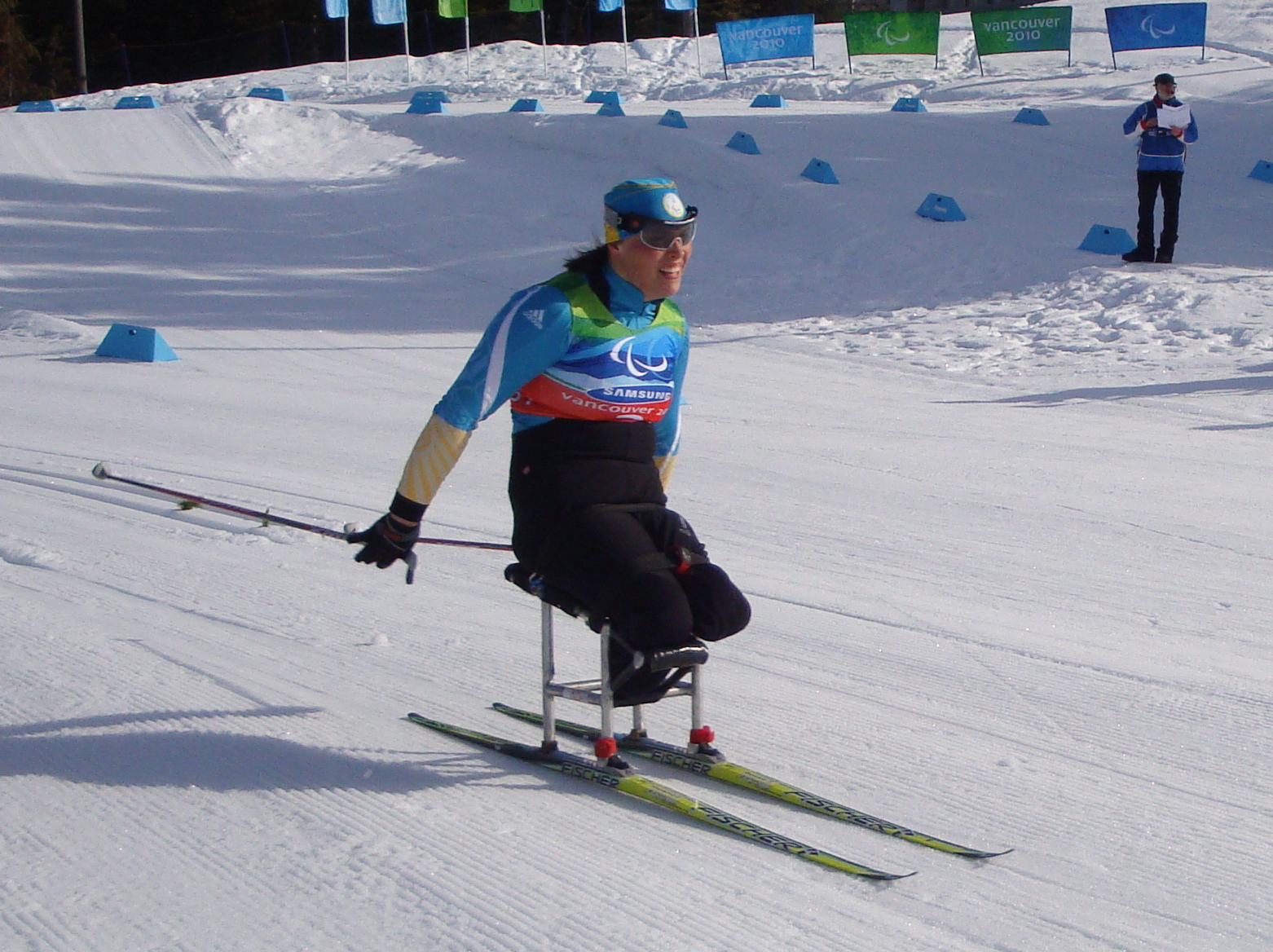
Olena Iurkovska of Ukraine competing on cross-country sit-skis at the 2010 Winter Paralympics.

Sit-skiers compete in a sitting position using a sit-ski, which has a chair supported with a suspension over a pair of skis that ride in a track; the chair has strapping to secure the skier. Standing skiers use conventional cross-country racing skis, which are of fiberglass-composite construction. Both use poles, when able, to provide propulsion.

== History ==
According to the International Paralympic Committee, para cross-country skiing was introduced at the 1976 inaugural Winter Paralympics in Örnsköldsvik, Sweden, initially using the classic technique. Skate-skiing was first sanctioned at the Innsbruck 1984 Winter Paralympics and became a "medal race" 1992 in Albertville, France. With the Lillehammer 1994 Winter Paralympics Nordic skiers first competed in the same venue used for the associated Olympic Winter Games.

=== Disciplines and distances ===
The history of events has evolved by discipline in the distance categories shown. Note that the four-year cycle changed after 1992 to match the pattern of the Olympic Winter Games.

Games	M/W	Distance									
1976	men	5 km	10 km	15 km	3x 5 km	3x 10 km					
1976	women	5 km	10 km		3x 5 km						
1980	men	5 km	10 km	20 km	4x 5 km	4x 10 km					
1980	women	5 km	10 km		4x 5 km						
1984	men	5 km	10 km		3x 2.5 km	4x 5 km	4x 10 km				
1984	women	2.5 km	5 km	10 km		3x 5 km	4x 5 km				
1988	men	5 km	10 km	15 km	20 km	30 km	3x 2.5 km	4x 5 km	4x 10 km		
1988	women	2.5 km	5 km	10 km			3x 5 km				
1992	men	5 km	10 km	20 km	30 km	3x 2.5 km	3x 5 km	4x 5 km			
1992	women	2.5 km	5 km	10 km							
1994	men	5 km (c)	15 km (f)	20 km (c)	4x 5 km		Sit-ski	5 km	10 km	15 km	3x 2.5 km
1994	women	5 km (c)	5 km (f)	10 km (c)	3x 2.5 km		Sit-ski	2.5 km	5 km	10 km	
1998	men	5 km (c)	15 km (f)	20 km (c)	3x 2.5 km	4x 5 km	Sit-ski	5 km	10 km	15 km	
1998	women	5 km (c)	5 km (f)	15 km (c)	3x 2.5 km		Sit-ski	2.5 km	5 km	10 km	
2002	men	5 km (c)	10 km (f)	20 km (f)	1x2.5 + 2x 5 km		Sit-ski	5 km	10 km	15 km	
2002	women	5 km (c)	10 km (f)	15 km (f)	3x 2.5 km		Sit-ski	2.5 km	5 km	10 km	
2006	men	5 km	10 km	20 km	1x 3,75 + 2x 5 km		Sit-ski	5 km	10 km	15 km	
2006	women	5 km	10 km	15 km	3x 2.5 km		Sit-ski	2.5 km	5 km	10 km	
2010	men	1 km (c)	10 km (c)	20 km (f)	1x 4 + 2x 5 km		Sit-ski	1 km	10 km	15 km	
2010	women	1 km (c)	5 km (c)	15 km (f)	3x 2.5 km		Sit-ski	1 km	5 km	10 km	

(c) = classic style, (f) = free style (skate-skiing)

== See also ==
- Cross-country skiing at the Winter Paralympics
- Ski for Light
