= Snowboard at the Winter Paralympics =

- Events: 8 (men: 6; women: 2)

Games
- 1960; 1964; 1968; 1972; 1976; 1980; 1984; 1988; 1992; 1996; 2000; 2004; 2008; 2012; 2016; 2020; 2024
- Medalists

Para snowboard is a Paralympic sport that is contested at the Winter Paralympic Games. Snowboard was first introduced with snowboard cross as part of Alpine skiing at the 2014 Winter Paralympics in Sochi, Russia. At the 2018 Winter Paralympics in PyeongChang, South Korea, events were held in 2 disciplines — snowboard cross and banked slalom — in 2 categories for women and 3 categories for men.

A total of 28 gold medals, 28 silver medals and 28 bronze medals have been awarded since 2014 and have been won by snowboarders from 15 National Paralympic Committees (NPC).

== Summary ==
Games	Year	Events	Best Nation
1			
2			
3			
4			
5			
6			
7			
8			
9			
10			
11	2014	2	United States
12	2018	10	United States
13	2022	8	China
14	2026	8	Italy

== Medal table ==
The ranking in the table is based on information provided by the International Paralympic Committee (IPC) and will be consistent with IPC convention in its published medal tables. By default, the table will be ordered by the number of gold medals the athletes from a nation have won (in this context, a "nation" is an entity represented by a National Paralympic Committee). The number of silver medals is taken into consideration next and then the number of bronze medals. If nations are still tied, equal ranking is given and they are listed alphabetically by IPC country code.

Last Updated after the 2026 Winter Paralympics

Rank	NPC	Gold	Silver	Bronze	Total
1	United States (USA)	9	10	8	27
2	China (CHN)	5	5	6	16
3	Netherlands (NED)	3	4	1	8
4	France (FRA)	3	2	1	6
5	Italy (ITA)	3	1	0	4
6	Finland (FIN)	2	1	1	4
7	Australia (AUS)	1	1	3	5
8	Canada (CAN)	1	1	2	4
9	Japan (JPN)	1	1	1	3
10	Switzerland (SUI)	0	1	1	2
11	Austria (AUT)	0	1	0	1
12	Croatia (CRO)	0	0	1	1
12	Great Britain (GBR)	0	0	1	1
12	South Korea (KOR)	0	0	1	1
12	Spain (ESP)	0	0	1	1
Totals (15 entries)		28	28	28	84

== Women ==
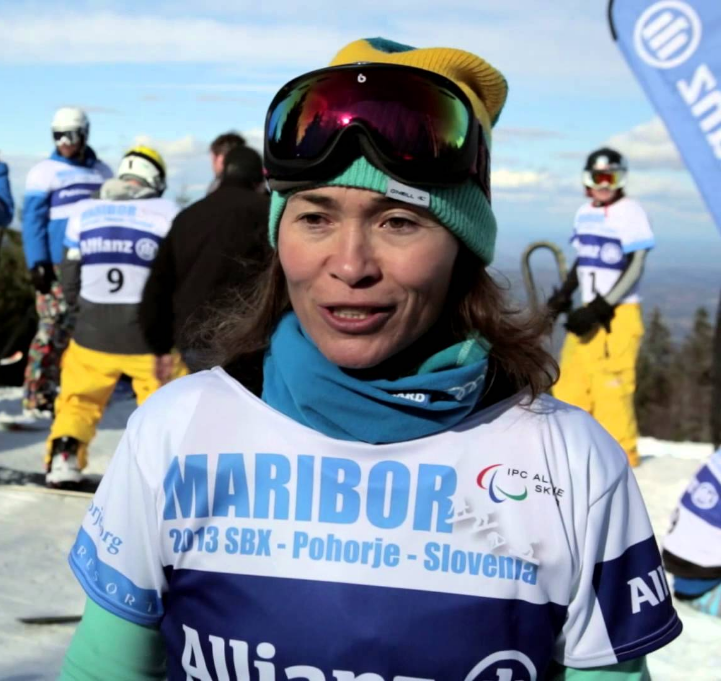
Bibian Mentel-Spee, first female Paralympic snowboard gold-medalist

=== Snowboard cross ===
Games	Class	Gold		Silver		Bronze	
2014 Sochi	SB-LL	Bibian Mentel; Netherlands	1:57.43	Cécile Hernandez; France	2:07.31	Amy Purdy; United States	2:14.29
2018 PyeongChang	SB-LL1	Brenna Huckaby; United States	1:17.02	Amy Purdy; United States	1:09.64	Cécile Hernandez; France	1:09.09
2018 PyeongChang	SB-LL2	Bibian Mentel-Spee; Netherlands	1:07.51	Lisa Bunschoten; Netherlands	1:13.59	Astrid Fina Paredes; Spain	1:23.11
2022 Beijing	SB-LL2	Cécile Hernandez; France		Lisa De Jong; Canada		Brenna Huckaby; United States	
2026 Milano Cortina	SB-LL2	Cécile Hernandez; France		Kate Delson; United States		Wang Xinyu; China	

=== Banked slalom ===
Games	Class	Gold		Silver		Bronze	
2018 PyeongChang	SB-LL1	Brenna Huckaby; United States	56.17	Cécile Hernandez; France	56.53	Amy Purdy; United States	1:05.40
2018 PyeongChang	SB-LL2	Bibian Mentel-Spee; Netherlands	56.94	Brittani Coury; United States	59.87	Lisa Bunschoten; Netherlands	1:00.04
2022 Beijing	SB-LL2	Brenna Huckaby; United States	1:17.28	Geng Yanhong; China	1:17.38	Li Tiantian; China	1:17.46
2026 Milano Cortina	SB-LL2	Kate Delson; United States	1:02.99	Lisa Bunschoten; Netherlands	1:03.53	Brenna Huckaby; United States	1:03.98

== Men ==
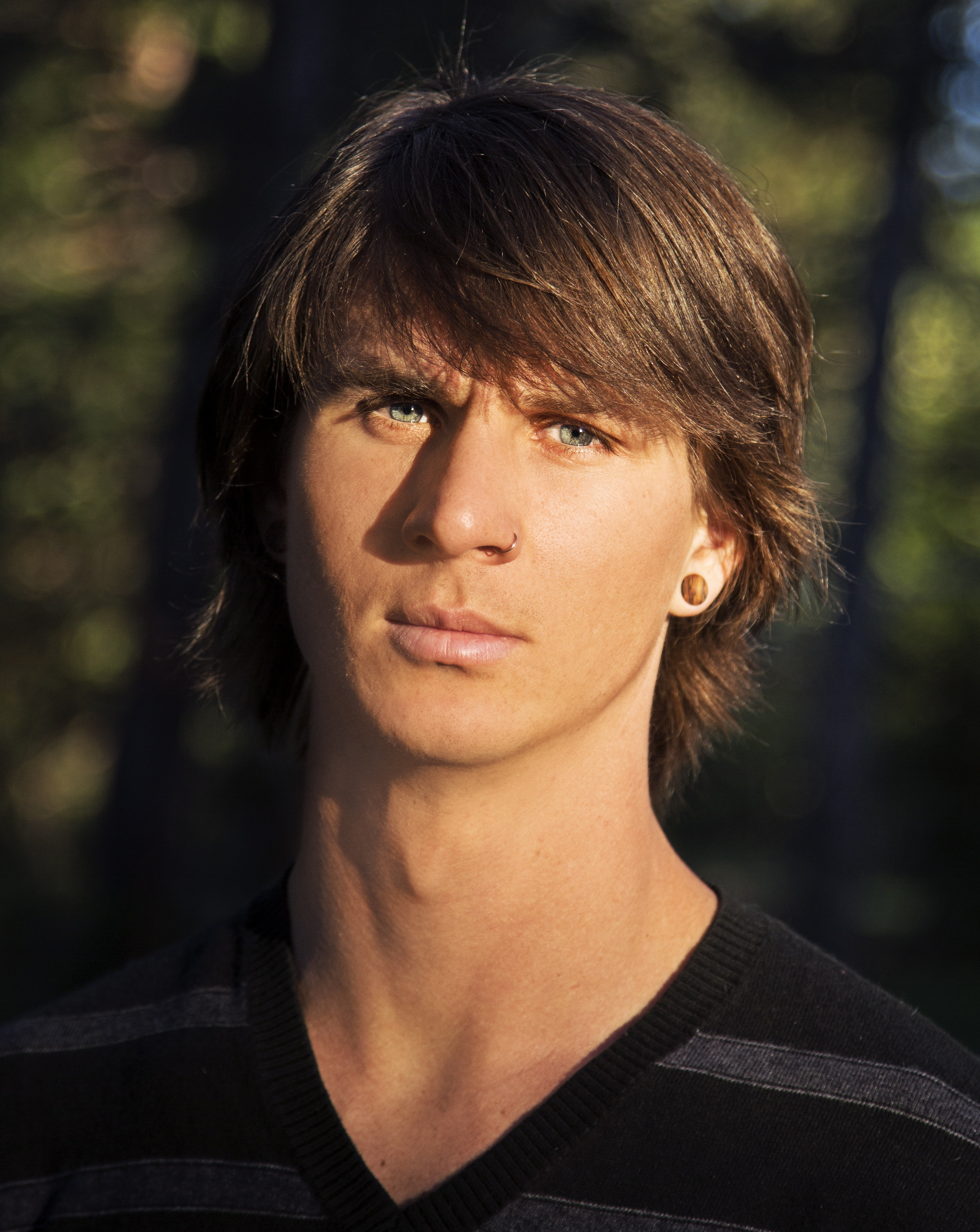
Evan Strong, first male Paralympic snowboarding gold-medalist

=== Snowboard cross ===
Event	Class	Gold		Silver		Bronze	
2014 Sochi	SB-LL	Evan Strong; United States	1:43.61	Michael Shea; United States	1:44.18	Keith Gabel; United States	1:47.10
2018 PyeongChang	SB-UL	Simon Patmore; Australia	1:01.76	Manuel Pozzerle; Italy	1:02.75	Mike Minor; United States	1:00.12
2018 PyeongChang	SB-LL1	Mike Schultz; United States	1:04.73	Chris Vos; Netherlands	1:03.13	Noah Elliott; United States	1:00.73
2018 PyeongChang	SB-LL2	Matti Suur-Hamari; Finland	58.35	Keith Gabel; United States	59.02	Gurimu Narita; Japan	58.21
2022 Beijing	SB-UL	Ji Lijia; China		Wang Pengyao; China		Wu Zhongwei; China	
2022 Beijing	SB-LL1	Matti Suur-Hamari; Finland		Garrett Geros; United States		Ben Tudhope; Australia	
2022 Beijing	SB-LL2	Tyler Turner; Canada		Mike Schultz; United States		Zhu Yonggang; China	
2026 Milano Cortina	SB-UL	Wang Pengyao; China		Ji Lijia; China		Aron Fahrni; Switzerland	
2026 Milano Cortina	SB-LL1	Wu Zhongwei; China		Noah Elliott; United States		Tyler Turner; Canada	
2026 Milano Cortina	SB-LL2	Emanuel Perathoner; Italy		Ben Tudhope; Australia		Lee Je-hyuk; South Korea	

=== Banked slalom ===
Event	Class	Gold		Silver		Bronze	
2018 PyeongChang	SB-UL	Mike Minor; United States	50.77	Patrick Mayrhofer; Austria	51.36	Simon Patmore; Australia	51.99
2018 PyeongChang	SB-LL1	Noah Elliott; United States	51.90	Mike Schultz; United States	53.42	Bruno Bošnjak; Croatia	54.08
2018 PyeongChang	SB-LL2	Gurimu Narita; Japan	48.68	Evan Strong; United States	49.20	Matti Suur-Hamari; Finland	49.51
2022 Beijing	SB-UL	Maxime Montaggioni; France	1:09.41	Ji Lijia; China	1:09.86	Zhu Yonggang; China	1:10.14
2022 Beijing	SB-LL1	Wu Zhongwei; China	1:10.85	Chris Vos; Netherlands	1:12.06	Tyler Turner; Canada	1:12.84
2022 Beijing	SB-LL2	Sun Qi; China	1:09.73	Matti Suur-Hamari; Finland	1:09.98	Ollie Hill; Great Britain	1:10.45
2026 Milano Cortina	SB-UL	Jacopo Luchini; Italy	56.28	Wang Pengyao; China	56.62	Jiang Zihao; China	57.03
2026 Milano Cortina	SB-LL1	Noah Elliott; United States	58.94	Oguri Daichi; Japan	59.02	Mike Schultz; United States	1:00.05
2026 Milano Cortina	SB-LL2	Emanuel Perathoner; Italy	54.28	Fabrice von Grünigen; Switzerland	56.29	Ben Tudhope; Great Britain	57.33

== Statistics ==
=== Athlete medal leaders ===
Athlete	Nation	Paralympics	Gold	Silver	Bronze	Total
Bibian Mentel-Spee	Netherlands (NED)	2014–2018	3	0	0	3
Brenna Huckaby	United States (USA)	2018–	2	0	0	2
Mike Schultz	United States (USA)	2018–	1	1	0	2
Evan Strong	United States (USA)	2014–	1	1	0	2
Noah Elliott	United States (USA)	2018–	1	0	1	2
Mike Minor	United States (USA)	2018–	1	0	1	2
Gurimu Narita	Japan (JPN)	2018–	1	0	1	2
Simon Patmore	Australia (AUS)	2018–	1	0	1	2
Matti Suur-Hamari	Finland (FIN)	2018–	1	0	1	2
Cécile Hernandez	France (FRA)	2014–	0	2	1	3
Amy Purdy	United States (USA)	2014–	0	1	2	3
Lisa Bunschoten	Netherlands (NED)	2018–	0	1	1	2
Keith Gabel	United States (USA)	2014–	0	1	1	2
Brittani Coury	United States (USA)	2018–	0	1	0	1
Patrick Mayrhofer	Austria (AUT)	2018–	0	1	0	1
Manuel Pozzerle	Italy (ITA)	2018–	0	1	0	1
Michael Shea	United States (USA)	2014–	0	1	0	1
Chris Vos	Netherlands (NED)	2018–	0	1	0	1
Bruno Bošnjak	Croatia (CRO)	2018–	0	0	1	1
Astrid Fina Paredes	Spain (ESP)	2018–	0	0	1	1

=== Medals per year ===
Nation	76	80	84	88	92	94	98	02	06	10	14	18	Years
United States (USA)											4	13	17
Netherlands (NED)											1	5	6
France (FRA)											1	2	3
Australia (AUS)												2	2
Finland (FIN)												2	2
Japan (JPN)												2	2
Austria (AUT)												1	1
Croatia (CRO)												1	1
Spain (ESP)												1	1
Italy (ITA)												1	1
Year	76	80	84	88	92	94	98	02	06	10	14	18	2

=== Medal sweep events ===
These are events where athletes from one nation won all three medals.

Games	Event	Class	Gold	Silver	Bronze
2014 Sochi	Men's snowboard cross	SB-LL	Evan Strong; United States	Mike Shea; United States	Keith Gabel; United States
2022 Beijing	Men's snowboarding cross	SB-UL	Ji Lijia; China	Wang Pengyao; China	Wu Zhongwei; China

== See also ==
- List of Olympic medalists in snowboarding
- List of Paralympic medalists in alpine skiing
- Lists of Paralympic medalists
