= Snowboard at the 2018 Winter Paralympics – Men's snowboard cross =

Men's snowboard cross at the XII Paralympic Winter Games
- Paralympic snowboard cross
- Venue: Jeongseon Alpine Centre, South Korea
- Dates: 12 March 2018
- Competitors: 55 from 20 nations

Men's snowboard cross SB-LL1 at the XII Paralympic Winter Games
- Competitors: 13 from 10 nations

Medalists
1st place, gold medalist(s)		Mike Schultz	United States
2nd place, silver medalist(s)		Chris Vos	Netherlands
3rd place, bronze medalist(s)		Noah Elliott	United States

Men's snowboard cross SB-LL2 at the XII Paralympic Winter Games
- Competitors: 20 from 13 nations

Medalists
1st place, gold medalist(s)		Matti Suur-Hamari	Finland
2nd place, silver medalist(s)		Keith Gabel	United States
3rd place, bronze medalist(s)		Gurimu Narita	Japan

Men's snowboard cross UL at the XII Paralympic Winter Games
- Competitors: 22 from 13 nations

Medalists
1st place, gold medalist(s)		Simon Patmore	Australia
2nd place, silver medalist(s)		Manuel Pozzerle	Italy
3rd place, bronze medalist(s)		Mike Minor	United States

The men's snowboard cross competition of the 2018 Winter Paralympics was held at Jeongseon Alpine Centre, South Korea. The competition took place on 12 March 2018.

== Medal table ==
The ranking in the table is based on information provided by the International Paralympic Committee (IPC) and will be consistent with IPC convention in its published medal tables. By default, the table will be ordered by the number of gold medals the athletes from a nation have won (in this context, a "nation" is an entity represented by a National Paralympic Committee). The number of silver medals is taken into consideration next and then the number of bronze medals. If nations are still tied, equal ranking is given and they are listed alphabetically by IPC country code.

Rank	Nation	Gold	Silver	Bronze	Total
1	United States (USA)	1	1	2	4
2	Austria (AUT)	1	0	0	1
2	Finland (FIN)	1	0	0	1
4	Italy (ITA)	0	1	0	1
4	Netherlands (NED)	0	1	0	1
6	Japan (JPN)	0	0	1	1
Totals (6 entries)		3	3	3	9

== Snowboard cross SB-LL1 ==
=== Qualification ===
The qualification was held at 11:05.

Q — Qualified for the quarterfinals
q — Qualified for the 1/8 finals

Rank	Bib	Name	Country	Time	Notes
1	23	Noah Elliott	United States	1:00.73	Q
2	24	Chris Vos	Netherlands	1:03.13	Q
3	26	Reinhold Schett	Austria	1:04.45	Q
4	29	Mike Mann	United States	1:04.58	q
5	30	Mike Schultz	United States	1:04.73	q
6	25	Bruno Bošnjak	Croatia	1:04.91	q
7	27	Daichi Oguri	Japan	1:09.93	q
8	31	Daniel Wagner	Denmark	1:11.76	q
9	28	Kristian Moen	Norway	1:15.59	q
10	34	André Cintra	Brazil	1:18.72	q
11	33	Mihăiță Papară	Romania	1:20.35	q
12	35	Atsushi Yamamoto	Japan	1:31.71	q
13	32	Víctor Manuel González	Spain	1:49.68	q

=== Elimination round ===
The elimination round was started at 13:45.

1/8 finals
8	Wagner (DEN)	W
9	Moen (NOR)
5	Schultz (USA)	W
12	Yamamoto (JPN)
4	Mann (USA)	W
13	González (ESP)
6	Bošnjak (CRO)	W
11	Papară (ROU)
7	Oguri (JPN)	W
10	Cintra (BRA)

Quarterfinals
1	Elliott (USA)	W
8	Wagner (DEN)
5	Schultz (USA)	W
4	Mann (USA)
3	Schett (AUT)	W
6	Bošnjak (CRO)
7	Oguri (JPN)
2	Vos (NED)	W

Semifinals
1	Elliott (USA)
5	Schultz (USA)	W
3	Schett (AUT)
2	Vos (NED)	W

Final
5	Schultz (USA)	W
2	Vos (NED)
Third place
1	Elliott (USA)	W
3	Schett (AUT)

== Snowboard cross SB-LL2 ==
=== Qualification ===
The top 16 athletes advanced to the elimination round.

Rank	Bib	Name	Country	Run 1	Run 2	Best	Notes
1	40	Gurimu Narita	Japan	58.21	DNS	58.21	Q
2	38	Matti Suur-Hamari	Finland	58.93	58.97	58.93	Q
3	42	Mike Shea	United States	1:00.11	59.32	59.32	Q
4	37	Keith Gabel	United States	1:01.38	59.40	59.40	Q
5	39	Owen Pick	Great Britain	59.02	1:00.55	59.02	Q
6	36	Evan Strong	United States	1:03.74	1:00.64	1:00.64	Q
7	41	Carl Murphy	New Zealand	1:02.12	1:00.90	1:00.90	Q
8	44	Ben Tudhope	Australia	58.35	1:01.28	58.35	Q
9	45	John Leslie	Canada	1:02.09	1:01.35	1:01.35	Q
10	43	Alex Massie	Canada	1:01.77	1:01.69	1:01.69	Q
11	46	Sun Qi	China	1:03.29	1:02.81	1:02.81	Q
12	48	Carlos Codina	Argentina	1:04.91	1:04.19	1:04.19	Q
13	50	Liu Gengliang	China	1:06.33	1:04.68	1:04.68	Q
14	47	Colton Liddle	Canada	1:00.08	1:06.15	1:00.08	Q
15	53	Ivan Osharov	Ukraine	1:11.71	1:10.71	1:10.71	Q
16	49	Kim Yun-ho	South Korea	1:24.20	1:17.82	1:17.82	Q
17	54	Hossein Solghani	Iran	1:26.18	1:17.95	1:17.95	
18	51	Vladimir Igushkin	Neutral Paralympic Athletes	1:21.52	1:18.58	1:18.58	
19	52	Choi Suk-min	South Korea	1:19.07	1:29.26	1:19.07	
20	55	Aleksandr Tsygankov	Neutral Paralympic Athletes	1:55.53	DSQ	1:55.53	

=== Elimination round ===
The elimination round was started at 13:52.

1/8 finals
1	Narita (JPN)	W
16	Kim (KOR)
8	Tudhope (AUS)
9	Leslie (CAN)	W
5	Pick (GBR)
12	Codina (ARG)	W
4	Gabel (USA)	W
13	Liu (CHN)
3	Shea (USA)	W
14	Liddle (CAN)
6	Strong (USA)	W
11	Sun (CHN)
7	Murphy (NZL)	W
10	Massie (CAN)
2	Suur-Hamari (FIN)	W
15	Osharov (UKR)

Quarterfinals
1	Narita (JPN)	W
9	Leslie (CAN)
12	Codina (ARG)
4	Gabel (USA)	W
3	Shea (USA)
6	Strong (USA)	W
7	Murphy (NZL)
2	Suur-Hamari (FIN)	W

Semifinals
1	Narita (JPN)
4	Gabel (USA)	W
6	Strong (USA)
2	Suur-Hamari (FIN)	W

Final
4	Gabel (USA)
2	Suur-Hamari (FIN)	W
Third place
1	Narita (JPN)	W
6	Strong (USA)

== Snowboard cross SB-UL ==
=== Qualification ===
The top 16 athletes advanced to the elimination round.

Rank	Bib	Name	Country	Run 1	Run 2	Best	Notes
1	8	Mike Minor	United States	1:00.12	1:02.11	1:00.12	Q
2	7	Patrick Mayrhofer	Austria	1:01.04	1:01.10	1:01.04	Q
3	2	Simon Patmore	Australia	1:01.76	1:02.45	1:01.76	Q
4	1	Curt Minard	Canada	1:02.72	1:02.08	1:02.08	Q
5	6	Manuel Pozzerle	Italy	1:03.60	1:02.75	1:02.75	Q
6	4	James Barnes-Miller	Great Britain	1:03.11	1:06.56	1:03.11	Q
7	10	Sean Pollard	Australia	1:06.57	1:04.03	1:04.03	Q
8	9	Ben Moore	Great Britain	1:04.80	1:04.47	1:04.47	Q
9	13	Paolo Priolo	Italy	1:04.58	1:04.64	1:04.58	Q
10	5	Jacopo Luchini	Italy	1:04.60	1:09.92	1:04.60	Q
11	16	Jiang Zihao	China	1:09.35	1:05.44	1:05.44	Q
12	15	Chen Zhuo	China	1:06.03	1:05.58	1:05.58	Q
13	3	Andrew Genge	Canada	1:08.90	1:05.74	1:05.74	Q
14	11	Julien Roulet	France	1:06.08	1:06.13	1:06.08	Q
15	12	James Sides	United States	1:06.60	1:06.47	1:06.47	Q
16	17	Mikhail Slinkin	Neutral Paralympic Athletes	1:07.96	1:07.71	1:07.71	Q
17	14	Matti Sairanen	Finland	1:07.89	1:11.81	1:07.89	
18	18	Michael Spivey	United States	1:08.87	1:08.33	1:08.33	
19	22	Konstantinos Petrakis	Greece	1:10.00	1:08.71	1:08.71	
20	21	Puriya Khaliltash	Iran	1:16.33	1:12.37	1:12.37	
21	20	Park Su-hyeok	South Korea	1:42.58	1:22.68	1:22.68	
22	19	Park Hang-seung	South Korea	DSQ	1:50.74	1:50.74	

=== Elimination round ===
The elimination round was started at 13:33.

1/8 finals
1	Minor (USA)	W
16	Slinkin (NPA)
8	Moore (GBR)
9	Priolo (ITA)	W
5	Pozzerle (ITA)	W
12	Chen (CHN)
4	Minard (CAN)	W
13	Genge (CAN)
3	Patmore (AUS)	W
14	Roulet (FRA)
6	Barnes-Miller (GBR)	W
11	Jiang (CHN)
7	Pollard (AUS)
10	Luchini (ITA)	W
2	Mayrhofer (AUT)	W
15	Sides (USA)

Quarterfinals
1	Minor (USA)	W
9	Priolo (ITA)
5	Pozzerle (ITA)	W
4	Minard (CAN)
3	Patmore (AUS)	W
6	Barnes-Miller (GBR)
10	Luchini (ITA)	W
2	Mayrhofer (AUT)

Semifinals
1	Minor (USA)
5	Pozzerle (ITA)	W
3	Patmore (AUS)	W
10	Luchini (ITA)

Final
5	Pozzerle (ITA)
3	Patmore (AUS)	W
Third place
1	Minor (USA)	W
10	Luchini (ITA)

== See also ==
- Snowboarding at the 2018 Winter Olympics
