= Snowboard at the 2018 Winter Paralympics – Men's banked slalom =

Men's banked slalom at the XII Paralympic Winter Games
- Paralympic snowboarding
- Venue: Jeongseon Alpine Centre, South Korea
- Dates: 16 March
- Competitors: 55 from 24 nations

Men's banked slalom SB-LL1 at the XII Paralympic Winter Games
- Competitors: 13 from 10 nations

Medalists
1st place, gold medalist(s)		Noah Elliott	United States
2nd place, silver medalist(s)		Mike Schultz	United States
3rd place, bronze medalist(s)		Bruno Bošnjak	Croatia

Men's banked slalom SB-LL2 at the XII Paralympic Winter Games
- Competitors: 20 from 13 nations

Medalists
1st place, gold medalist(s)		Gurimu Narita	Japan
2nd place, silver medalist(s)		Evan Strong	United States
3rd place, bronze medalist(s)		Matti Suur-Hamari	Finland

Men's banked slalom UL at the XII Paralympic Winter Games
- Competitors: 22 from 13 nations

Medalists
1st place, gold medalist(s)		Mike Minor	United States
2nd place, silver medalist(s)		Patrick Mayrhofer	Austria
3rd place, bronze medalist(s)		Simon Patmore	Australia

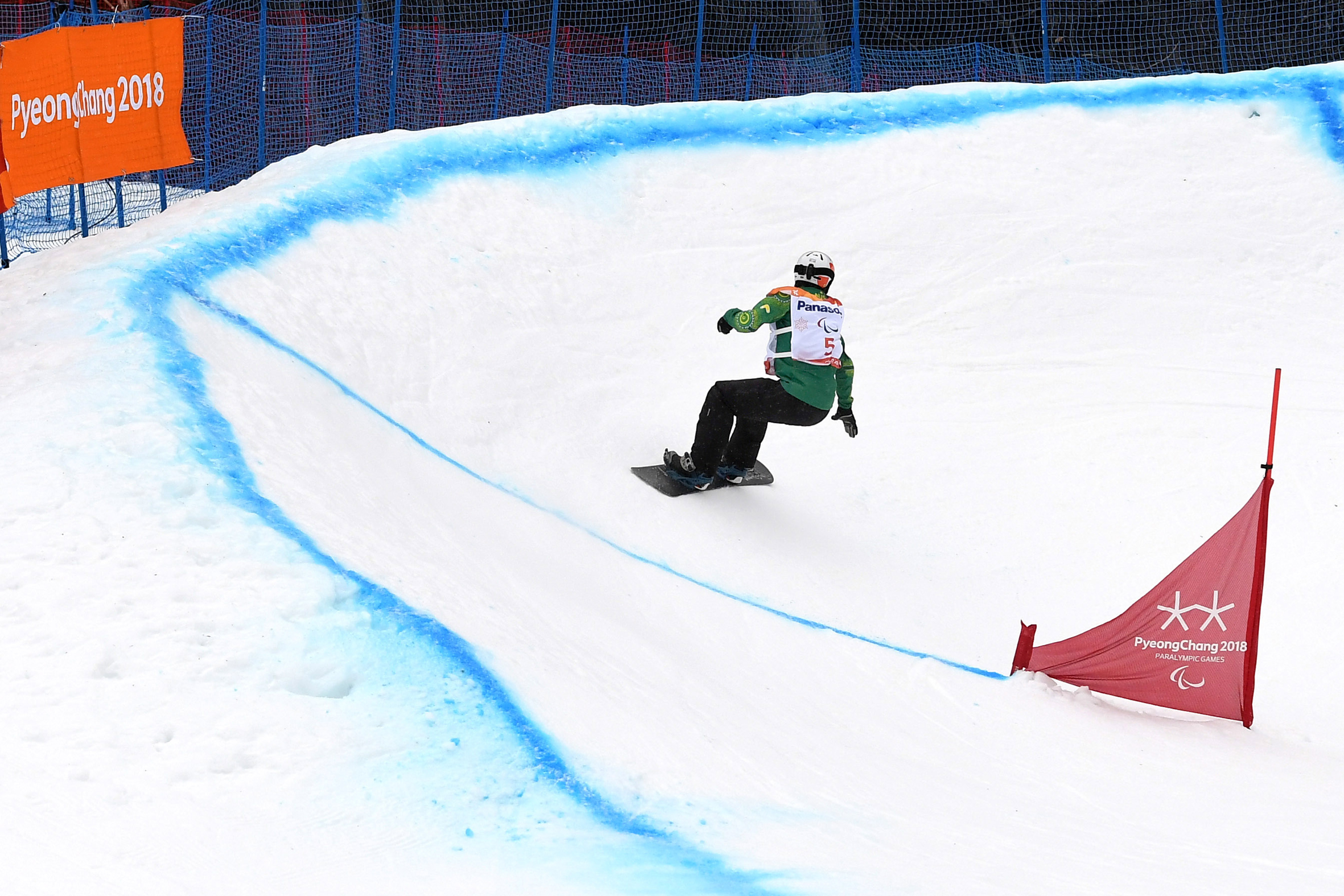
Simon Patmore competing in a banked slalom event at the 2018 Paralympics

The men's banked slalom competition of the 2018 Winter Paralympics was held at Jeongseon Alpine Centre in South Korea. The competition took place on 16 March 2018.

== Medal table ==
The ranking in the table is based on information provided by the International Paralympic Committee (IPC) and will be consistent with IPC convention in its published medal tables. By default, the table will be ordered by the number of gold medals the athletes from a nation have won (in this context, a "nation" is an entity represented by a National Paralympic Committee). The number of silver medals is taken into consideration next and then the number of bronze medals. If nations are still tied, equal ranking is given and they are listed alphabetically by IPC country code.

Rank	Nation	Gold	Silver	Bronze	Total
1	United States (USA)	2	2	0	4
2	Japan (JPN)	1	0	0	1
3	Austria (AUT)	0	1	0	1
4	Australia (AUS)	0	0	1	1
4	Croatia (CRO)	0	0	1	1
4	Finland (FIN)	0	0	1	1
Totals (6 entries)		3	3	3	9

== Banked slalom SB-LL1 ==
The following 13 athletes from 10 countries competed.

Rank	Bib	Name	Country	Run 1	Run 2	Run 3	Best
1st place, gold medalist(s)	27	Noah Elliott	United States	52.77	53.84	51.90	51.90
2nd place, silver medalist(s)	25	Mike Schultz	United States	54.21	DSQ	53.42	53.42
3rd place, bronze medalist(s)	29	Bruno Bošnjak	Croatia	57.23	54.08	1:02.68	54.08
4	23	Chris Vos	Netherlands	59.24	54.28	DNF	54.28
5	30	Reinhold Schett	Austria	1:00.95	57.14	56.28	56.28
6	26	Daichi Oguri	Japan	1:00.16	DSQ	58.47	58.47
7	24	Kristian Moen	Norway	1:03.39	59.19	DNF	59.19
8	28	Mike Mann	United States	1:10.67	1:01.78	DNF	1:01.78
9	32	Daniel Wagner	Denmark	1:07.24	1:12.11	1:08.32	1:07.24
10	35	André Cintra	Brazil	1:35.18	1:07.88	1:08.53	1:07.88
11	34	Mihăiță Papară	Romania	1:31.41	1:10.85	1:12.18	1:10.85
12	33	Víctor Manuel González	Spain	1:21.59	DSQ	DNF	1:21.59
	31	Atsushi Yamamoto	Japan	DSQ	DNF	DNS	

== Banked slalom SB-LL2 ==
The following 20 athletes from 13 countries competed.

Rank	Bib	Name	Country	Run 1	Run 2	Run 3	Best
1st place, gold medalist(s)	36	Gurimu Narita	Japan	50.17	49.61	48.68	48.68
2nd place, silver medalist(s)	43	Evan Strong	United States	51.03	50.05	49.20	49.20
3rd place, bronze medalist(s)	39	Matti Suur-Hamari	Finland	51.05	51.64	49.51	49.51
4	40	Mike Shea	United States	50.45	50.01	49.70	49.70
5	44	Carl Murphy	New Zealand	52.00	51.80	50.21	50.21
6	42	Keith Gabel	United States	52.81	51.86	51.43	51.43
7	41	Ben Tudhope	Australia	52.02	52.63	51.68	51.68
8	37	John Leslie	Canada	57.56	54.10	52.53	52.53
9	38	Owen Pick	Great Britain	52.81	DSQ	53.26	52.81
10	45	Alex Massie	Canada	54.40	54.14	53.28	53.28
11	46	Sun Qi	China	59.58	1:05.06	53.66	53.66
12	49	Colton Liddle	Canada	57.13	56.15	1:06.49	56.15
13	47	Carlos Codina	Argentina	1:08.44	1:01.96	56.24	56.24
14	48	Liu Gengliang	China	57.89	1:05.57	58.32	57.89
15	51	Ivan Osharov	Ukraine	1:05.84	1:02.78	1:03.76	1:02.78
16	54	Vladimir Igushkin	Neutral Paralympic Athletes	1:18.83	1:12.66	1:08.50	1:08.50
17	53	Hossein Solghani	Iran	1:11.84	DSQ	1:09.11	1:09.11
18	52	Choi Suk-min	South Korea	1:20.02	1:27.99	1:25.20	1:20.02
19	55	Aleksandr Tsygankov	Neutral Paralympic Athletes	1:24.02	1:41.15	1:30.22	1:24.02
	50	Kim Yun-ho	South Korea	DNF	DNS	DNS	

== Banked slalom SB-UL ==
The following 22 athletes from 13 countries competed.

Rank	Bib	Name	Country	Run 1	Run 2	Run 3	Best
1st place, gold medalist(s)	8	Mike Minor	United States	53.29	53.92	50.77	50.77
2nd place, silver medalist(s)	6	Patrick Mayrhofer	Austria	57.30	51.96	51.36	51.36
3rd place, bronze medalist(s)	5	Simon Patmore	Australia	54.11	52.78	51.99	51.99
4	7	Jacopo Luchini	Italy	54.30	56.05	52.02	52.02
5	4	Sean Pollard	Australia	57.11	53.84	55.39	53.84
6	3	Manuel Pozzerle	Italy	57.38	56.05	54.19	54.19
7	2	Ben Moore	Great Britain	56.79	54.33	DSQ	54.33
8	9	Curt Minard	Canada	55.13	54.67	55.09	54.67
9	14	Jiang Zihao	China	1:00.56	56.77	1:20.55	56.77
10	22	Mikhail Slinkin	Neutral Paralympic Athletes	1:05.15	57.79	57.00	57.00
10	1	James Barnes-Miller	Great Britain	58.23	57.00	1:08.17	57.00
12	11	Park Hang-seung	South Korea	1:02.55	57.88	57.07	57.07
13	10	Chen Zhuo	China	1:25.76	DSQ	57.49	57.49
14	15	James Sides	United States	1:01.34	1:01.21	58.11	58.11
15	13	Roberto Cavicchi	Italy	1:01.54	58.17	59.05	58.17
16	12	Julien Roulet	France	58.47	58.67	58.31	58.31
17	16	Andrew Genge	Canada	1:00.01	58.95	58.63	58.63
18	17	Michael Spivey	United States	1:01.95	59.74	59.40	59.40
19	20	Konstantinos Petrakis	Greece	1:03.30	59.45	1:00.97	59.45
20	19	Matti Sairanen	Finland	DNF	DNF	1:02.45	1:02.45
21	21	Puriya Khaliltash	Iran	1:32.41	1:05.31	1:02.67	1:02.67
22	18	Park Su-hyeok	South Korea	1:04.97	1:03.80	1:03.89	1:03.80

== See also ==
- Snowboarding at the 2018 Winter Paralympics
- Snowboarding at the 2018 Winter Olympics
