= World Para Snowboard Championships =

Series of snowboarding championships

The World Para Snowboard Championships were played for the first time at 2015.

== Locations ==
| Number | Year | Location | Country | Events |
|---|---|---|---|---|
| 1 | 2015 | La Molina | Spain | 10 |
| 2 | 2017 | Big White | Canada | 10 |
| 3 | 2019 | Pyhä | Finland | 16 |
| 4 | 2021 | Lillehammer | Norway | 16 |
| 5 | 2023 | La Molina | Spain | 16 |
| 6 | 2025 | Big White | Canada | 10 |
| 7 | 2027 | | | |

== Medal table ==
| Rank | IPC | Gold | Silver | Bronze | Total |
|---|---|---|---|---|---|
| 1 | Netherlands (NED) | 12 | 4 | 4 | 20 |
| 2 | United States (USA) | 11 | 11 | 9 | 31 |
| 3 | France (FRA) | 9 | 5 | 0 | 14 |
| 4 | Finland (FIN) | 4 | 0 | 1 | 5 |
| 5 | Canada (CAN) | 3 | 5 | 3 | 11 |
| 6 | Poland (POL) | 3 | 0 | 1 | 4 |
| 7 | China (CHN) | 2 | 3 | 1 | 6 |
| 8 | Italy (ITA) | 1 | 2 | 3 | 6 |
| 9 | Austria (AUT) | 1 | 2 | 1 | 4 |
| 10 | Great Britain (GBR) | 0 | 4 | 4 | 8 |
| 11 | Australia (AUS) | 0 | 4 | 3 | 7 |
| 12 | Japan (JPN) | 0 | 1 | 2 | 3 |
| 13 | Russia (RUS) | 0 | 1 | 1 | 2 |
| 14 | Norway (NOR) | 0 | 1 | 0 | 1 |
| 14 | Spain (ESP) | 0 | 1 | 0 | 1 |
| 16 | Switzerland (SUI) | 0 | 0 | 3 | 3 |
| 17 | Denmark (DEN) | 0 | 0 | 1 | 1 |
| 17 | RPC (RPC) | 0 | 0 | 1 | 1 |
| Totals (18 entries) | | 46 | 44 | 38 | 128 |

== Medalists ==
=== Men's events ===
Snowboard cross SB-LL1

| Event | Gold | Silver | Bronze |
|---|---|---|---|
| La Molina 2015 | Netherlands; Chris Vos | Norway; Kristian Moen | Russia; Serafim Pikalov |
| Big White 2017 | Netherlands; Chris Vos | Austria; Reinhold Schett | United States; Mark Mann |
| Pyha 2019 | United States; Noah Elliott | Netherlands; Chris Vos | United States; Mike Schultz |

Snowboard cross SB-LL2

| Event | Gold | Silver | Bronze |
|---|---|---|---|
| La Molina 2015 | Finland; Matti Suur-Hamari | United States; Evan Strong | Canada; Alex Massie |
| Big White 2017 | Finland; Matti Suur-Hamari | United States; Evan Strong | United States; Mike Shea |
| Pyha 2019 | United States; Keith Gabel | Australia; Ben Tudhope | United States; Zach Miller |

Snowboard cross SB-UL

| Event | Gold | Silver | Bronze |
|---|---|---|---|
| La Molina 2015 | Italy; Manuel Pozzerle | Italy; Roberto Cavicchi | Great Britain; Ben Moore |
| Big White 2017 | United States; Mike Minor | France; Maxime Montaggioni | Italy; Jacopo Luchini |
| Pyha 2019 | France; Maxime Montaggioni | Australia; Simon Patmore | Australia; Sean Pollard |

Banked slalom SB-LL1

| Event | Gold | Silver | Bronze |
|---|---|---|---|
| La Molina 2015 | Netherlands; Chris Vos | Russia; Serafim Pikalov | Denmark; Daniel Wagner |
| Big White 2017 | Netherlands; Chris Vos | United States; Mike Schultz | Austria; Reinhold Schett |
| Pyha 2019 | United States; Mike Schultz | United States; Noah Elliott | Netherlands; Chris Vos |

Banked slalom SB-LL2

| Event | Gold | Silver | Bronze |
|---|---|---|---|
| La Molina 2015 | United States; Mike Shea | United States; Evan Strong | Finland; Matti Suur-Hamari |
| Big White 2017 | Finland; Matti Suur-Hamari | Great Britain; Owen Pick | Japan; Gurimu Narita |
| Pyha 2019 | China; Sun Qi | Great Britain; Owen Pick | Japan; Shinji Tabuchi |

Banked slalom SB-UL

| Event | Gold | Silver | Bronze |
|---|---|---|---|
| La Molina 2015 | Austria; Patrick Mayrhofer | Great Britain; Ben Moore | Italy; Manuel Pozzerle |
| Big White 2017 | France; Maxime Montaggioni | United States; Mike Minor | Great Britain; Ben Moore |
| Pyha 2019 | France; Maxime Montaggioni | Austria; Patrick Mayrhofer | Italy; Jacopo Luchini |

=== Women's events ===
Snowboard cross SB-LL1

| Event | Gold | Silver | Bronze |
|---|---|---|---|
| La Molina 2015 | United States; Brenna Huckaby | France; Cécile Hernandez | United States; Nicole Roundy |
| Big White 2017 | United States; Brenna Huckaby | France; Cécile Hernandez | United States; Nicole Roundy |
| Pyha 2019 | France; Cécile Hernandez | Only one competitor | |

Snowboard cross SB-LL2

| Event | Gold | Silver | Bronze |
|---|---|---|---|
| La Molina 2015 | Netherlands; Bibian Mentel-Spee | United States; Heidi Jo Duce | Netherlands; Lisa Bunschoten |
| Big White 2017 | Netherlands; Bibian Mentel-Spee | Netherlands; Lisa Bunschoten | Australia; Joany Badenhorst |
| Pyha 2019 | Netherlands; Lisa Bunschoten | Canada; Sandrine Hamel | Netherlands; Anne Garttener |

Snowboard cross SB-UL

| Event | Gold | Silver | Bronze |
|---|---|---|---|
| Pyha 2019 | Poland; Monika Kotzian | China; Pang Qiaorong | China; Lu Jiangli |

Banked slalom SB-LL1

| Event | Gold | Silver | Bronze |
|---|---|---|---|
| La Molina 2015 | France; Cécile Hernandez | United States; Brenna Huckaby | United States; Nicole Roundy |
| Big White 2017 | United States; Brenna Huckaby | France; Cécile Hernandez | United States; Amy Purdy |
| Pyha 2019 | France; Cécile Hernandez | China; Liu Yunhai | Only two competitors |

Banked slalom SB-LL2

| Event | Gold | Silver | Bronze |
|---|---|---|---|
| La Molina 2015 | Netherlands; Bibian Mentel-Spee | Australia; Joany Badenhorst | United States; Heidi Jo Duce |
| Big White 2017 | Netherlands; Bibian Mentel-Spee | Netherlands; Lisa Bunschoten | Australia; Joany Badenhorst |
| Pyha 2019 | Netherlands; Lisa Bunschoten | Canada; Sandrine Hamel | Spain; Astrid Fina Paredes |

Banked slalom SB-UL

| Event | Gold | Silver | Bronze |
|---|---|---|---|
| Pyha 2019 | China; Pang Qiaorong | China; Lu Jiangli | Poland; Monika Kotzian |

== See also ==
- Para-snowboarding classification
- Snowboarding at the Winter Paralympics

== Sources ==
- Big White 2017
- Snowboard Medal Count
- Week 15
- Big White 2017
- Big White host 2017 World Para Snowboard Championships
- History
- 2017-2018 World Cup
- Calendar results
- 2017-2018 World Cup
- Calendar results
