= Argentina at the 2018 Winter Paralympics =

Argentina sent competitors to the 2018 Winter Paralympics in Pyeongchang, South Korea. The people were Carles Codina and Enrique Plantey. Codina competed in para-snowboarding. Plantey competed in para-alpine skiing.

== Team ==
Argentina sent two people to Pyeongchang, South Korea. They were Carles Codina and Enrique Plantey. Codina competed in para-snowboarding. Plantey competed in para-alpine skiing.

The table below contains the list of members of people (called "Team Argentina") that will be participating in the 2018 Games.

Team Argentina
Name	Sport	Gender	Classification	Events	ref
Carles Codina	para-snowboarding	male	SB-LL2		
Enrique Plantey	para-alpine skiing	male	LW11	giant slalom	

== Results ==
=== Alpine skiing ===
For the super combined event, the first run is the super-G and the second run is the slalom.

Men

Athlete	Class	Event	Run 1		Run 2		Total	
Athlete	Class	Event	Time	Rank	Time	Rank	Time	Rank
Enrique Plantey	LW11	Super-G, sitting	—N/a				DSQ	
Enrique Plantey	LW11	Super combined, sitting	1:35.97	22	DNF		—N/a	
Enrique Plantey	LW11	Giant slalom, sitting	DNF		—N/a			
Enrique Plantey	LW11	Slalom, sitting	59.52	14	59.59	11	1:59.11	11

== Snowboarding ==
Banked slalom

Athlete	Event	Run 1	Run 2	Run 3	Best	Rank
Carlos Codina	Men's banked slalom, SB-LL2	1:08.44	1:01.96	56.24	56.24	13

Snowboard cross

Athlete	Event	Seeding						1/8 final	Quarterfinal	Semifinal	Final	
Athlete	Event	Run 1		Run 2		Best	Seed	1/8 final	Quarterfinal	Semifinal	Final	
Athlete	Event	Time	Rank	Time	Rank	Best	Seed	Position	Position	Position	Position	Rank
Carlos Codina	Men's snowboard cross, SB-LL2	1:03.29	11	1:02.81	10	1:02.81	12 Q	Pick (GBR); W	Gabel (USA); L	did not advance		8
