= Jacopo Luchini =

Italian Para snowboarder (born 1990)

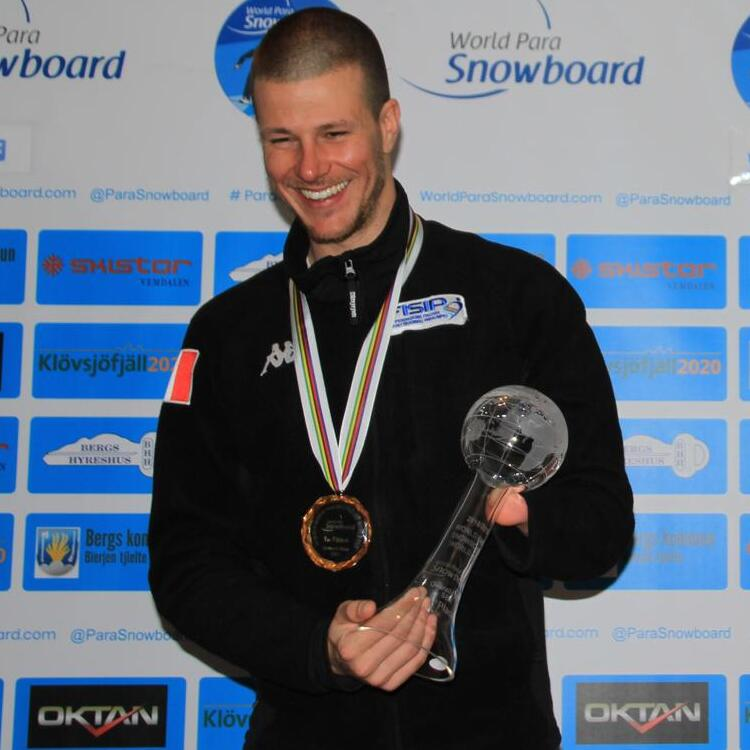
- Luchini in 2019

Personal information
- Born: 10 October 1990 (age 35) Prato, Italy

Sport
- Country: Italy
- Sport: Para snowboard
- Disability: Aplasia
- Disability class: SB-UL
Medal record
Men's Para snowboard
Representing Italy
Paralympic Games
Gold medal – first place	2026 Milano Cortina	Banked slalom
World Championships
Silver medal – second place	2021 Lillehammer	Dual banked slalom
Bronze medal – third place	2017 Big White	Snowboard cross
Bronze medal – third place	2019 Pyha	Banked slalom

Jacopo Luchini (born 10 October 1990) is an Italian Para snowboarder. He is a three-time Paralympian.

== Career ==
Luchini competed at the World Para Snowboard Championships and won bronze medals in the snowboard cross event in 2017 and banked slalom event in 2019.

Luchini made his Winter Paralympic Games debut in 2018 and finished in fourth place in both the banked slalom and snowboard cross events. He again competed at the 2022 Winter Paralympics with his best result being fifth place in the banked slalom event.

In February 2026, he was selected to represent Italy at the 2026 Winter Paralympics. He won a gold medal in the banked slalom event with a time of 56.28 seconds.

== Personal life ==
Luchini was born with aplasia of the left hand.
