= Snowboard at the 2018 Winter Paralympics =

Snowboarding at the XII Paralympic Winter Games
- Venue: Jeongseon Alpine Centre
- Dates: 12, 16 March

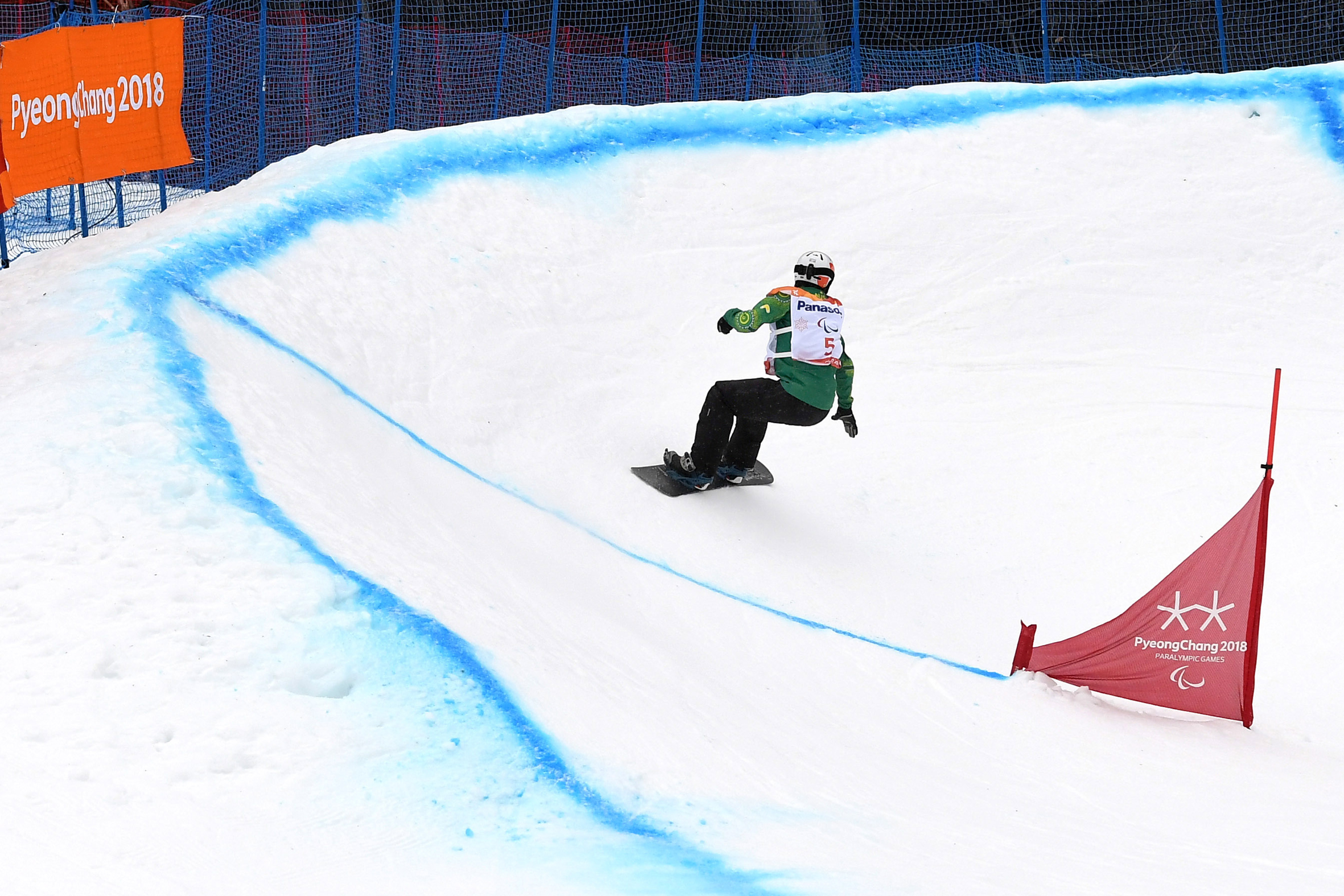
Simon Patmore competing in a banked slalom event at the 2018 Paralympics

The Para snowboard competition of the 2018 Winter Paralympics was held on 12 and 16 March 2018 at the Jeongseon Alpine Centre in Gangneung, South Korea.

== Classification ==
Para-snowboarding is divided into three classification categories.

SB-LL1
Athletes competing in the class SB-LL1 have significant impairment to one leg, such as amputation above the knee, or "a significant combined impairment in two legs", affecting their balance, their board-control and their ability to navigate uneven terrain. Athletes with annotations will use prostheses during racing.
SB-LL2
Athletes competing in the class SB-LL2 have impairment to one or both legs "with less activity limitation", such as below-knee amputation.
SB-UL
Athletes competing in the class SB-UL have upper limb impairments, affecting balance. There are no events for female athletes in the category SB-UL in the 2018 games.

== Competition schedule ==
The following is the competition schedule for all 10 events (five categories in snowboard cross and five in banked slalom).

All times are local (UTC+9).

Date	Time	Event
12 March	10:30	Women's snowboard cross qualification run 1
12 March	10:42	Men's snowboard cross qualification run 1
12 March	11:54	Women's snowboard cross qualification run 2
12 March	11:59	Men's snowboard cross qualification run 2
12 March	13:33	Men's snowboard cross 1/8 finals
12 March	14:05	Women's snowboard cross quarterfinals
12 March	14:09	Men's snowboard cross quarterfinals
12 March	14:27	Women's snowboard cross semifinals
12 March	14:33	Men's snowboard cross semifinals
12 March	14:42	Women's snowboard cross small finals
12 March	14:45	Men's snowboard cross small finals
12 March	14:49	Women's snowboard cross big finals
12 March	14:56	Men's snowboard cross big finals
16 March	10:30	Women's banked slalom run 1
16 March	10:45	Men's banked slalom run 1
16 March	11:42	Women's banked slalom run 2
16 March	11:57	Men's banked slalom run 2
16 March	12:54	Women's banked slalom run 3
16 March	13:13	Men's banked slalom run 3

== Medal summary ==
=== Medal table ===
The ranking in the table is based on information provided by the International Paralympic Committee (IPC) and will be consistent with IPC convention in its published medal tables. By default, the table will be ordered by the number of gold medals the athletes from a nation have won (in this context, a "nation" is an entity represented by a National Paralympic Committee). The number of silver medals is taken into consideration next and then the number of bronze medals. If nations are still tied, equal ranking is given and they are listed alphabetically by IPC country code.

Rank	Nation	Gold	Silver	Bronze	Total
1	United States (USA)	5	5	3	13
2	Netherlands (NED)	2	2	1	5
3	Australia (AUS)	1	0	1	2
3	Finland (FIN)	1	0	1	2
3	Japan (JPN)	1	0	1	2
6	France (FRA)	0	1	1	2
7	Austria (AUT)	0	1	0	1
7	Italy (ITA)	0	1	0	1
9	Croatia (CRO)	0	0	1	1
9	Spain (ESP)	0	0	1	1
Totals (10 entries)		10	10	10	30

=== Women's events ===
Event	Class	Gold		Silver		Bronze	
Banked slalom	SB-LL1	Brenna Huckaby; United States	56.17	Cécile Hernandez; France	56.53	Amy Purdy; United States	1:05.40
Banked slalom	SB-LL2	Bibian Mentel-Spee; Netherlands	56.94	Brittani Coury; United States	59.87	Lisa Bunschoten; Netherlands	1:00.04
Snowboard cross	SB-LL1	Brenna Huckaby; United States		Amy Purdy; United States		Cécile Hernandez; France	
Snowboard cross	SB-LL2	Bibian Mentel-Spee; Netherlands		Lisa Bunschoten; Netherlands		Astrid Fina Paredes; Spain	

=== Men's events ===
Event	Class	Gold		Silver		Bronze	
Banked slalom	SB-LL1	Noah Elliott; United States	51.90	Mike Schultz; United States	53.42	Bruno Bošnjak; Croatia	54.08
Banked slalom	SB-LL2	Gurimu Narita; Japan	48.68	Evan Strong; United States	49.20	Matti Suur-Hamari; Finland	49.51
Banked slalom	SB-UL	Mike Minor; United States	50.77	Patrick Mayrhofer; Austria	51.36	Simon Patmore; Australia	51.99
Snowboard cross	SB-LL1	Mike Schultz; United States		Chris Vos; Netherlands		Noah Elliott; United States	
Snowboard cross	SB-LL2	Matti Suur-Hamari; Finland		Keith Gabel; United States		Gurimu Narita; Japan	
Snowboard cross	SB-UL	Simon Patmore; Australia		Manuel Pozzerle; Italy		Mike Minor; United States	
