= Joany Badenhorst =

Australian Paralympic snowboarder

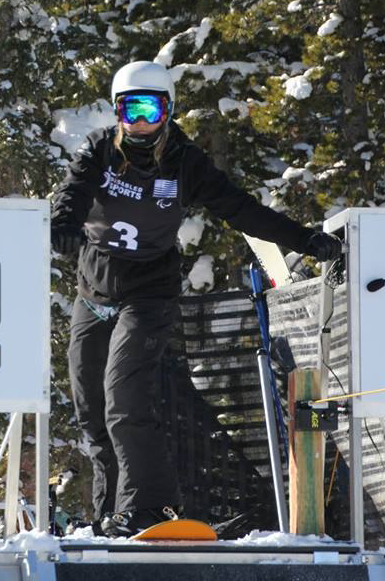
- Badenhorst in March 2014

Personal information
- Born: 10 August 1994 (age 32) Harrismith, South Africa

Sport
- Country: Australia
- Sport: Para-snowboarding
- Disability class: SB-LL
Medal record
Women's para snowboarding
Representing Australia
World Championships
Silver medal – second place	2015 La Molina	Women's SB-LL2 Banked
Bronze medal – third place	2017 Big White	Women's SB-LL2 Banked
Bronze medal – third place	2017 Big White	Women's SB-LL2 Cross

Joany Badenhorst (born 10 August 1994) is a South African-born Australian Paralympian who was selected to compete in Para-snowboard cross at the 2014 Winter Paralympics in Sochi. She would have been the first female snowboarder to represent Australia at the Winter Paralympics, but was forced to withdraw from her event after injuring her left knee on the morning of the event. In February 2018, she was selected in the Australian team to compete at the 2018 Winter Paralympics.

== Personal ==
Joany Badenhorst was born on 10 August 1994 in Harrismith, South Africa. Her mother Petro is a teacher and her father Peter is an architect. She has two brothers, Garrett and Peter. She attended Harrismith Primary School.

On 12 July 2005, whilst playing with a group of friends on her family farm, her trousers were caught in the power take-off shaft of a tractor that was clearing firebreaks. Her left leg was severed 6 inches (150 mm) below the knee. The tractor driver died in a bush fire a month later. Her family moved to Australia in 2009 so she could receive better medical assistance. She had further surgery to rectify problems with her leg in early 2011. As of 2014 she lives in Griffith, New South Wales, and resides in Jindabyne during the Australian ski season.

== Career ==
Before her accident, Badenhorst was an accomplished athlete who had won provincial colours in high jump and modern dance. After her accident, she was fitted with a prosthetic leg, and placed second in the school 100 metres event. She competed for South Africa at the Paralympic Youth Games in 2009, and narrowly missed qualifying for the Australian athletics team for the 2012 Summer Paralympics in London.

Australian Paralympic snowboarding coach Peter Higgins identified Badenhorst as a likely snowboarder after the London Games, and she commenced training in this sport. In taking up snowboarding, she needed a new custom-made leg. Badenhorst said: "I need a special leg that has to be engineered differently to accommodate the different pressures and angles of snowboarding".

In the lead-up to the 2014 Sochi Games, Badenhorst competed and trained in the Netherlands, Austria, and the United States. By February 2014, she was ranked eighth in the world. She would have been the first female snowboarder to represent Australia at the Winter Paralympics at Sochi, but was forced to withdraw from her event after injuring her left knee whilst training on the morning of the event.

In February 2015, at the IPC Para-Snowboard World Championships in La Molina, Spain, she won a silver medal in the Women's SB-LL2. She competed with one arm in a cast due to a fracture caused in a training accident a week before the Championships.

At the 2017 IPC Para-Snowboard World Championships in Big White City, she won bronze medals in the Women's Snowboard Cross Banked Slalom and Women's Snow Board Cross Lower limb 2 impairment.

Badenhorst was selected on the Australian team for 2018 Winter Paralympics but was injured in a training run just prior to the day of competition and was declared medically unfit to compete. She was also the Australian flag bearer at the Opening Ceremony.

Badenhorst says that her career highlight is being Australia's first, and to date only, female representative in Para-snowboard. In addition to this, Joany states that the greatest moment in her career was winning the 2016/17 IPC World Cup Crystal Globe in Snowboard Cross.

She announced her retirement in September 2019 and stated she would focus her time on studying, as she is completing a Bachelor of Journalism.

== Recognition ==
- 2018 – Co-captain with Mitchell Gourley of the Australian Team at 2018 Winter Paralympics
- 2018- Winter Paralympics Opening Ceremony flag bearer, the first female Australian Winter Paralympian to be given this honour.
