= Brazil at the 2018 Winter Paralympics =

- IPC code: BRA
- NPC: Brazilian Paralympic Committee
- Website: www.cpb.org.br

in Pyeongchang
- Competitors: 3 in 2 sports
- Medals: Gold 0 Silver 0 Bronze 0 Total 0

Winter Paralympics appearances (overview)
- 2014; 2018; 2022; 2026

Brazil sent competitors to the 2018 Winter Paralympics in Pyeongchang, South Korea. The team included one man and one woman. Both people competed in para-Nordic skiing. Aline Rocha is the first woman to be part of the Brazilian team at the Winter Paralympics. It is the second time Brazil went to the Winter Paralympics. They first went in 2014 to the Winter Paralympics in Sochi.

== Team ==
Brazil sent two people to Pyeongchang for the 2018 Winter Paralympics. The team included Aline Rocha. She is the first woman to be part of the Brazilian team at the Winter Paralympics. The country wanted to send five people to South Korea. They had the right to two spots in December 2017. One spot was for a man and one spot was for a woman.

The table below contains the list of members of people (called "Team Brazil") that participated in the 2018 Games.

Team Brazil
Name	Sport	Gender	Hometown	Classification	Events	ref
Cristian Ribera	para-Nordic skiing	male			cross country skiing	
Aline Rocha	para-Nordic skiing	female	Pinhão		cross country skiing	

== History ==
Brazil first competed at the Winter Paralympics in 2014 in Sochi. André Cintra competed in snowboarding. Fernando Aranha competed in cross-country skiing.

== Cross-country skiing ==
=== Men ===
Athlete	Class	Event	Qualification			Semifinal			Final		
Athlete	Class	Event	Real time	Calculated time	Rank	Real time	Calculated time	Rank	Real time	Calculated time	Rank
Cristian Ribera	LW11	15km, sitting	—N/a						46:35.2	43:47.5	6
Cristian Ribera	LW11	1.1km sprint, sitting	3:29.96	3:17.36	15	—N/a					
Cristian Ribera	LW11	7.5km, sitting	—N/a						25:12.3	23:41.6	9

=== Women ===
Athlete	Class	Event	Qualification			Semifinal			Final		
Athlete	Class	Event	Real time	Calculated time	Rank	Real time	Calculated time	Rank	Real time	Calculated time	Rank
Aline Rocha	LW11	12km, sitting	—N/a						49:19.9	46:22.3	15
Aline Rocha	LW11	1.1km sprint, sitting	4:39.92	4:23.13	22	—N/a					
Aline Rocha	LW11	5km, sitting	—N/a						20:37.7	19:23.4	12

=== Relay ===
Athletes	Event	Final	
Athletes	Event	Time	Rank
Aline Rocha; Cristian Ribera	4 x 2.5km mixed relay	32:16.7	13

== Snowboarding ==
=== Banked slalom ===
Athlete	Event	Run 1	Run 2	Run 3	Best	Rank
André Cintra	Men's banked slalom, SB-LL1	1:35.18	1:07.88	1:08.53	1:07.88	10

=== Snowboard cross ===
Athlete	Event	Seeding						1/8 final	Quarterfinal	Semifinal	Final	
Athlete	Event	Run 1		Run 2		Best	Seed	1/8 final	Quarterfinal	Semifinal	Final	
Athlete	Event	Time	Rank	Time	Rank	Best	Seed	Position	Position	Position	Position	Rank
André Cintra	Men's snowboard cross, SB-LL1	1:18.72	10	cancelled		1:18.72	10 Q	Oguri (JPN); L	did not advance			10
