= Mike Shea (snowboarder) =

American Paralympic snowboarder

Personal information
- Nationality: Van Nuys, California, US
- Born: March 31, 1983 (age 43)
- Height: 5'8
- Weight: 150

Sport
- Country: United States
- Sport: Snowboarding
- Disability class: SB-LL2
- Event(s): Snowboard cross, Banked slalom
Medal record
Men's para snowboarding
Representing United States
Winter Paralympic Games
Silver medal – second place	2014 Sochi	Snowboard cross

Mike Shea (born March 31, 1983) is a retired American para-snowboarder. He won a silver medal at the 2014 Winter Paralympics in the inaugural Snowboard cross event. At the World Para Snowboard Championships in the LL2 division, Shea won gold in the 2015 banked slalom event and bronze in the 2017 snowboard cross event. In 2014 and 2015, Shea was nominated for the Best Male Athlete with a Disability ESPY Award. Shea retired from snowboarding in 2020.

== Early life ==
Shea was born on March 31, 1983, in Van Nuys, California to parents Michael and Cynthia Shea. Shortly after he was born, his family moved to Castaic, California where he attended Valencia High School for a little over a year and eventually graduated from Bowman High School. In September 2002, Shea was wakeboarding on Castaic Lake when the ski rope wrapped around his ankle and severed his leg below his knee. At the time, he was growing addicted to alcohol and painkillers which worsened following his accident. He eventually entered into rehab in 2007 and followed their 12-step program for being sober.

== Career ==
Upon being sober, Shea opened a carpentry business where he created dog houses and custom entertainment centers. In 2010, he received a call from a coach from the National Sports Center for the Disabled (NSCD) informing him that the International Paralympic Committee was considering adding competitive snowboarding events to the competition. As a result, he closed his business and relocated to Winter Park Resort so he could start training. Through his training, Shea competed in Snowboard cross at Winter X Games where he won a silver medal and, later, three World Championships.

In 2014, Shea became a member of the "Three Amigos" (along with Keith Gabel and Evan Strong) competing in snowboarding internationally for Team USA. He won the International Paralympic Committee (IPC) World Cup Title in February 2014 and earned a silver medal at the inaugural snowboarding event at the 2014 Winter Paralympics. Upon winning the silver medal, he began earning endorsements and developed a career as an inspirational speaker. Later that year, the three also competed at the IPC Alpine Skiing Europa Cup in their first-ever banked slalom Para-snowboarding event. As a result of his success, Shea was named a finalist for Team USA’s Male Paralympic Athlete of the Year. Shea was nominated for the Best Male Athlete with a Disability ESPY Award in 2014 and 2015.

As a World Para Snowboard Championships competitor in 2015 for the LL2 division, Shea was first in the banked slalom event and ninth in the snowboard cross event. Shea reappeared at the World Para Snowboard Championships in 2017, where he won a bronze medal in snowboard cross and finished seventh in banked slalom. At the 2018 Winter Paralympics snowboarding events, Shea was fourth in banked slalom and fifth in snowboard cross. Shea officially retired from competitive snowboarding at the age of 37 in September 2020 due to health problems and chronic injuries.
