= Monika Kotzian =

Polish Paralympic snowboarder

Personal information
- Full name: Monika Aleksandra Kotzian
- Nationality: Polish
Medal record
Women's para snowboarding
Representing Poland
World Championships
Gold medal – first place	2019 Pyha	Snowboard cross
Gold medal – first place	2021 Lillehammer	Dual banked slalom
Gold medal – first place	2021 Lillehammer	Snowboard cross
Bronze medal – third place	2019 Pyha	Banked slalom

Monika Aleksandra Kotzian is a Polish para-snowboarder. Born without a left hand and forearm, she competes in the SB-UL category.

== Life and career ==
Kotzian competed at the 2019 World Para Snowboard Championships, winning the gold and bronze in the snowboard cross and banked slalom respectively. She won the gold medal in the women's dual banked slalom at the 2021 World Para Snow Sports Championships held in Lillehammer, Norway. She also won the gold medal in the women's snowboard cross event.
