= Sun Qi =

Chinese Paralympic snowboarder (born 1999)

Personal information
- Nationality: Chinese
- Born: 11 August 1999 (age 26)

Sport
- Sport: Para snowboard
- Disability class: SB-LL2
Medal record
Representing China
Men's para snowboarding
Winter Paralympic Games
Gold medal – first place	2022 Beijing	Banked slalom
World Championships
Gold medal – first place	2019 Pyha	Banked slalom

Sun Qi (born 11 August 1999) is a Chinese para snowboarder. He represented China at the 2022 and 2026 Winter Paralympics.

== Career ==
He competed at the 2018 World Para Snowboard World Cup in Landgraaf, Netherlands where he became the first Chinese player to win an international para-snowboarding gold medal.

He represented China at the 2018 Winter Paralympics in PyeongChang, South Korea, where he finished in 11th place in the banked slalom and snowboard cross events. He again represented China at the 2022 Winter Paralympics in Beijing, China and won a gold medal in the banked slalom event.
