= Australia at the 2018 Winter Paralympics =

- IPC code: AUS
- NPC: Australian Paralympic Committee
- Website: www.paralympic.org.au

in PyeongChang, Korea
- Competitors: 15 in 2 sports
- Flag bearers: Joany Badenhorst (Opening); Melissa Perrine (Closing)
- Medals Ranked 15th: Gold 1 Silver 0 Bronze 3 Total 4

Winter Paralympics appearances (overview)
- 1976; 1980; 1984; 1988; 1992; 1994; 1998; 2002; 2006; 2010; 2014; 2018; 2022; 2026

Australia sent a team of 12 athletes and three guides to the 2018 Winter Paralympics in PyeongChang, Korea. Australia finished 15th on the medal table and it was its fourth best medal performance at the Winter Paralympics.

== Medallists ==
Medal	Name	Sport	Event	Date
Gold	Simon Patmore	Snowboarding	Snowboard cross SB-UL	12 March
Bronze	Simon Patmore	Snowboarding	Snowboard banked SB-UL	16 March
Bronze	Melissa Perrine; Guide: Christian Geiger	Alpine skiing	Super combined B & VI	13 March
Bronze	Melissa Perrine; Guide: Christian Geiger	Alpine skiing	Giant slalom B & VI	14 March

== Team Preparation ==
It was expected that the final Australian team would be between 10 and 12 athletes across two sports – para-alpine skiing and para-snowboard. There is the aim to finish in the top 15 nations on the medal table, as per the target set by the Australian Sports Commission’s Australia’s Winning Edge policy. The team will be missing previous Winter Paralympic Games medallists - Cameron Rahles-Rahbula, Toby Kane and Jessica Gallagher.

The Australian Paralympic Committee expects Mitchell Gourley, Melissa Perrine, Joany Badenhorst and Ben Tudhope to be medal contenders.

The Australian Sports Commission provided Ski and Snowboard Australia the following funding for Australia's Winter Paralympic high performance program: 2014/15 = $934,478: 2015/16 - $934,478; 2016/17 - $934,478; 2017/18 - $1,009,478

== Administration ==
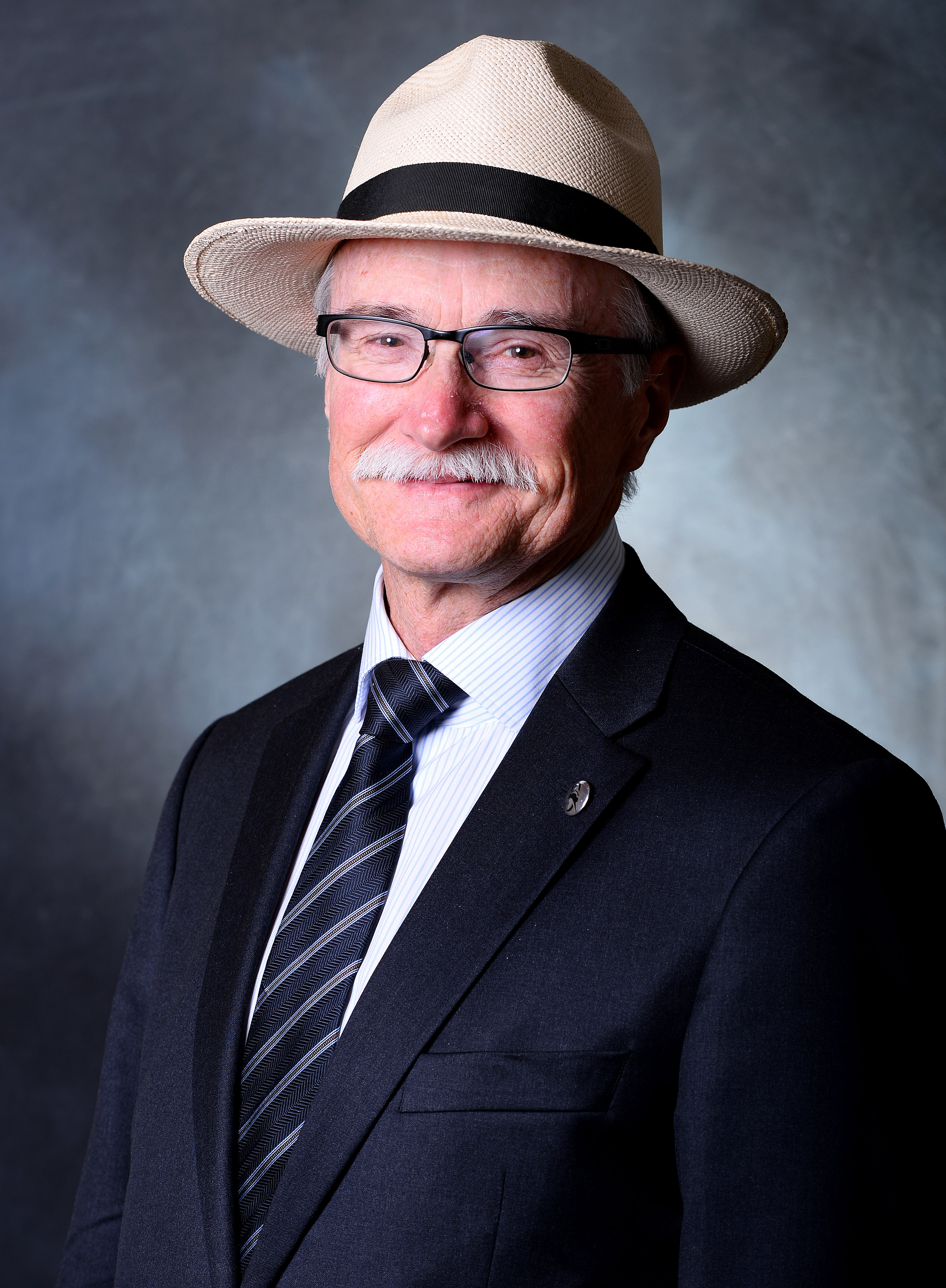
Nick Dean, Australian Paralympic administrator

In March 2017, Nick Dean was appointed Chef de Mission. He previously served as Chef de Mission at the Lillehammer 1994, Nagano 1998 and Salt Lake City 2002 Games and was Deputy Chef de Mission for a further three Winter and two Summer Paralympic Games between 1992 and 2012.

Team Support
Position	Person
Chef de Mission	Nick Dean
General Manager, Paralympic Performance & Out of Village	Paul Kiteley
Team Attaché and Security	Melissa Riethmuller
General Manager, Communications	Tim Mannion
Head coach, Alpine	Chris McKnight
Coach, Alpine	Craig Branch
Head coach, Snowboard	Lukas Prem
Ski Technician	Curtis Christian
Ski Technician	Ryan Pearl
Snowboard Technician	Tony Horne
Chief Medical Officer	Dr Geoff Thompson
Physiotherapist	Justin Wray
Physiotherapist	Tom Peters
Psychologist	Kristine Dunn
Team Leader	Annie McCormack
Operations Manager	Shellee Ferguson
IT and Operations Manager	Ben Troy
Media Liaison Officer	Sascha Ryner
Media Liaison Officer	Margie McDonald
Videographer	Brett Frawley
Vice-President APC	Jock O'Callaghan
CEO APC	Lynne Anderson

== Team ==
Mitchell Gourley and Joany Badenhorst were announced team co-captains in October 2017. On 20 February 2018, Australian Paralympic Committee announced a team of 13 athletes. Shaun Pianta and sighted guide Jeremy O'Sullivan were selected in the team on 6 March but Pianta will be required to pass a final fitness test on his injured right knee ahead of his Paralympic debut on March 14.

The final team of 12 athletes and three sighted guides is the largest Australian team to compete at a Winter Paralympic Games.

Joany Badenhorst was named the Opening Ceremony flag bearer, the first female Australian Winter Paralympian to be given this honour. Melissa Perrine was given the honour of the Closing Ceremony flag bearer due to her competing at three Winter Games and winning two bronze medals in PyeongChang.

== Events ==
=== Alpine skiing ===
Women

Athlete	Event	Final				Date
Athlete	Event	Run 1	Run 2	Total Time	Rank	Date
Melissa Perrine / Christian Geiger (guide) B2	Downhill Visually Impaired			1:35.40	5	10 March
Melissa Perrine / Christian Geiger (guide) B2	Super-G visually impaired			1:36.96	5	11 March
Melissa Perrine / Christian Geiger (guide) B2	Super combined Visually Impaired	1:35.50 (6)	55.32 (1)	2:30.82	3rd place, bronze medalist(s)	13 March
Melissa Perrine / Christian Geiger (guide) B2	Slalom Visually Impaired	56.74 (5)	58.33 (2)	1:55.07	4	18 March
Melissa Perrine / Christian Geiger (guide) B2	Giant slalom visually impaired	1:14.95 (3)	1:13.86 (2)	2:28.81	3rd place, bronze medalist(s)	14 March
Victoria Pendergast LW12-1	Downhill sit-ski			1:44.14	4	10 March
Victoria Pendergast LW12-1	Super-G sit-ski			DNF	DNF	11 March
Victoria Pendergast LW12-1	Super combined super-G sit-ski	1:44.49(8)	DNS		DNS	13 March
Victoria Pendergast LW12-1	Giant slalom sit-ski	1:21.22 (9)	1:20.15 (8)	2:41.37	8	14 March

Men

Athlete	Event	Final				Date
Athlete	Event	Run 1	Run 2	Total Time	Rank	Date
Mitchell Gourley LW6/8-2	Downhill Standing			DNF	DNF	10 March
Mitchell Gourley LW6/8-2	Slalom Standing	48.69 (3)	53.63 (12)	1:42.32	6	17 March
Mitchell Gourley LW6/8-2	Giant slalom standing	1:07.87 (5)	1:08.60 (8)	2:16.47	8	14 March
Mitchell Gourley LW6/8-2	Super-G standing			1:30.34	12	11 March
Mitchell Gourley LW6/8-2	Super combined standing	1:27.13 (3)	49.77 (8)	2:16.90	5	13 March
Jonty O'Callaghan LW9-1	Downhill Standing			1:34.86	22	10 March
Jonty O'Callaghan LW9-1	Slalom Standing	DNF			DNF	17 March
Jonty O'Callaghan LW9-1	Giant slalom standing	1:15.64 (29)	1:16.58 (25)	2:32.22	23	14 March
Jonty O'Callaghan LW9-1	Super-G standing			DNF	DNF	11 March
Jonty O'Callaghan LW9-1	Super combined standing	DNF			DNF	13 March
Mark Soyer LW11	Downhill Sitting			DNF	DNF	10 March
Mark Soyer LW11	Slalom Sitting	DNF			DNF	17 March
Mark Soyer LW11	Giant slalom Sitting	1:16.95 (22)	1:12.99 (16)	2:29.94	18	14 March
Mark Soyer LW11	Super-G sitting			1:32.32	16	11 March
Mark Soyer LW11	Super combined Sitting	1:33.24 (18)	DNF		DNF	13 March
Sam Tait LW11	Downhill Sitting			1:28.56	11	10 March
Sam Tait LW11	Slalom Sitting	DNF			DNF	17 March
Sam Tait LW11	Giant slalom Sitting	1:17.36 (24)	1:10.92 (13)	2:28.28	17	14 March
Sam Tait LW11	Super-G sitting			DNF	DNF	11 March
Sam Tait LW11	Super combined Sitting	DNF			DNF	13 March
Patrick Jensen B2; Lara Falk (guide)	Slalom Standing Visually Impaired	DNF			DNF	17 March
Patrick Jensen B2; Lara Falk (guide)	Giant slalom standing Visually Impaired	1:16.55 (11)	1:15.61 (12)	2:32.16	11	14 March
Shaun Pianta B2; Jeremy O'Sullivan (guide)	Slalom Standing Visually Impaired	DNF			DNF	17 March
Shaun Pianta B2; Jeremy O'Sullivan (guide)	Giant slalom standing Visually Impaired	1:25.97 (14)	1:21.88 (14)	2:47.85	14	14 March

=== Snowboarding ===
Women

Joany Badenhorst was injured in a training run just prior to the day of competition and was declared medically unfit to compete.

Men

Athlete	Event	Race 1		Race 2		1/8	Q/F	S/F	Final
Athlete	Event	Time	Rank	Time	Rank	Position	Position	Position	Position
Simon Patmore; SB-UL	Men's snowboard cross	1:01.76	3	1:02.45	4 Q	1Q	1Q	1Q	1st place, gold medalist(s)
Simon Patmore; SB-UL	Men's snowboard cross	Sean Pollard; SB-UL	1:06.57	12	1:06.57	6Q	2	—N/a	
Ben Tudhope; SB-LL2	Men's snowboard cross	1:03.74	12	1:00.64	5 Q	2	—N/a		

Men

Athlete	Event	Run 1		Run 2		Run 3		Best time	
Athlete	Event	Time	Rank	Time	Rank	Time	Rank	Time	Rank
Simon Patmore; SB-UL	Men's snowboard banked	54.11	2	52.78	2	51.99	3	51.99	3rd place, bronze medalist(s)
Sean Pollard; SB-UL	Men's snowboard banked	57.11	6	53.84	3	55.39	7	53.84	5
Ben Tudhope; SB-LL2	Men's snowboard banked	52.02	6	52.63	7	51.68	7	51.68	7

== Media Coverage ==
Seven Network has an agreement with the Australian Paralympic Committee to provide coverage of Australia’s Winter Paralympic sport across Seven’s television, digital and print media assets to bring the stories of Australia’s winter Paralympic athletes to more Australians than ever before. Coverage will include a daily highlights show to be broadcast on 7MATE every morning, with an encore highlights on 7TWO and Channel 7 in the evening. It is the first time a commercial television network has covered Australian athletes at the Winter Paralympics. During the Games, Channel Seven encountered criticism from former Paralympians and current athletes due to it limiting its coverage of the nine-day event to a one-hour highlights show the day after competition for Australian audiences.

== See also ==
- Images of Australian Team at the 2018 Winter Paralympics
