= Daichi Oguri =

Japanese para snowboarder (born 1981)

Personal information
- Born: 19 January 1981 (age 45) Aichi, Japan

Sport
- Sport: Para snowboard
- Disability class: SB-LL1
Medal record
Representing Japan
Men's para snowboarding
Winter Paralympic Games
Silver medal – second place	2026 Milano Cortina	Banked slalom
World Championships
Bronze medal – third place	2025 Big White	Snowboard cross

Daichi Oguri (小栗大地, Oguri Daichi; born 19 January 1981) is a Japanese para snowboarder. He is a three-time Paralympian.

== Career ==
Oguri made his Winter Paralympic Games debut in 2018 and finished in sixth place in the banked slalom event. He again represented Japan at the 2022 Winter Paralympics and finished in fifth place in the snowboard cross and seventh place in the banked slalom event.

He competed at the 2025 World Para Snowboard Championships and won a bronze medal in the snowboard cross event. In February 2026, he was selected to represent Japan at the 2026 Winter Paralympics. He won a silver medal in the banked slalom SB-LL1 event with a time of 59.02 seconds.
