= Carl Murphy (snowboarder) =

New Zealand para-snowboarder

Personal information
- Born: Carl Anthony Murphy; 17 April 1979 (age 47) New Plymouth, New Zealand
- Occupation: Architectural designer

Sport
- Country: New Zealand
- Sport: Para snowboard
- Event: Snowboard cross
Medal record
Men's para snowboarding
Representing New Zealand
Winter X Games
Silver medal – second place	2015 Aspen	Snowboard X adaptive

Carl Anthony Murphy (born 17 April 1979) is a New Zealand Para-snowboard cross racer who competed at the 2014 and 2018 Winter Paralympics.

== Personal life ==
Murphy was born in New Plymouth on 17 April 1979. He was born missing the lower part of one of his legs and then had the leg amputated at the knee. He works as an architectural designer.

== Snowboarding ==
Murphy competes in the SB LL2 Para-snowboarding classification, using a specially designed carbon fibre prosthetic leg.

He started snowboarding in 1997 and entered his first competition in 2007, winning two gold medals at the New Zealand Championships. In 2008 at the US Championships he won a silver medal in the giant slalom and a bronze in the slalom. In 2009 he was selected for the New Zealand national team.

In February 2012 Murphy won a silver medal at the Para-Snowboard World Championships, held in Orcières, France, finishing behind American Evan Strong. Later that year in November he won two gold medals at the IPC Alpine Skiing race in the Netherlands. In 2013 he won the gold medal at the IPC Para-Snowboard World Cup in Canada and a bronze medal at the Paralympic Winter Games Test event in Sochi, Russia. He was ranked number one in the world for the men's snowboard cross by IPC Alpine Skiing and was named both athlete of the year and adaptive athlete of the year at the Snow Sports NZ Annual Awards.

At the 2014 Winter Paralympics held in Sochi, Murphy was selected as part of the New Zealand team. Competing in the men's snowboard cross, which was making its debut in the Paralympics, he placed fourth in each of the first two races, with times of 54.62 seconds and 54.48 seconds, before being disqualified from the third race. His combined time of 1 minute 49.10 seconds was 5.49 seconds slower than gold medallist Evan Strong and meant that Murphy finished outside the medal positions in fourth place.

At the 2015 Winter X Games Murphy won a silver medal. However, he sustained an ACL injury that made him miss the 2015 World Championships. In February 2016 he ruptured his patella tendon whilst competing in Canada in his first race since recovering from his CAL injury.
