= Alex Massie (snowboarder) =

Canadian Paralympic snowboarder (born 1995)

Personal information
- Born: March 19, 1995 (age 31) Barrie, Ontario, Canada

Sport
- Sport: Para snowboard
- Disability class: SB-LL2
Medal record
Men's para snowboarding
Representing Canada
World Para Snowboard Championships
Gold medal – first place	2021 Lillehammer	Team event
Silver medal – second place	2021 Lillehammer	Dual banked slalom
Bronze medal – third place	2015 La Molina	Snowboard cross
Winter X Games
Silver medal – second place	2016 Aspen	Snowboard X adaptive
Bronze medal – third place	2015 Aspen	Snowboard X adaptive

Alex Massie (born March 19, 1995) is a Canadian para-snowboarder. He is a three-time Paralympian.

== Career ==
Massie competed at Winter X Games XIX and won a bronze medal in the adaptive snowboard-cross event. The next year at Winter X Games XX he won a silver medal in the adaptive snowboard-cross event.

He competed at the 2021 World Para Snow Sports Championships and won a silver medal in the men's dual banked slalom, and won a gold medal with Tyler Turner in the men's team event.

He represented Canada at the 2018 Winter Paralympics, 2022 Winter Paralympics, and 2026 Winter Paralympics.

== Personal life ==
Massie had a wakeboarding accident in 2011 which resulted in him losing his left leg below the knee.
