= Gurimu Narita =

Japanese Paralympic snowboarder (born 1994)

Personal information
- Nationality: Japanese
- Born: 1 February 1994 (age 32) Osaka, Japan

Sport
- Sport: Snowboarding
- Disability class: SB-LL2
Medal record
Men's para snowboarding
Representing Japan
Winter Paralympic Games
Gold medal – first place	2018 Pyeongchang	Banked slalom SB-LL2
Bronze medal – third place	2018 Pyeongchang	Snowboard cross SB-LL2

Gurimu Narita (成田 緑夢, Narita Gurimu, born 1 February 1994) is a Japanese disabled snowboarder. He won gold in Snowboarding at the 2018 Winter Paralympics – Men's banked slalom in the SB-LL2 classification and bronze in Snowboarding at the 2018 Winter Paralympics – Men's snowboard cross.
