= Patrick Mayrhofer =

Austrian para-snowboarder

Personal information
- Nationality: Austrian
- Born: 15 September 1987 (age 38) Helfenberg, Upper Austria
- Years active: 6
- Height: 173 cm (5 ft 8 in)
- Weight: 65 kg (143 lb)
- Website: Patrick Mayrhofer on Facebook

Sport
- Sport: Snowboarding
- Disability class: SB-UL
- Event(s): Snowboard Cross, Banked Slalom
- Coached by: Jean-Claude Keipes, Mario Ratz
Medal record
Men's para snowboarding
Representing Austria
Winter Paralympic Games
Silver medal – second place	2018 PyeongChang	Banked slalom SB-UL
World Championships
Silver medal – second place	2019 Pyhä	Banked slalom SB-UL
Gold medal – first place	2015 La Molina	Banked slalom SB-UL

Patrick Mayrhofer (born 15 September 1987) is Austria's most successful Paralympic Snowboarder. He won Silver in the Banked Slalom at the 2018 Winter Paralympics in PyeongChang, South Korea, Gold in the Banked Slalom at the 2015 World Para Snowboard World Championships in La Molina, Spain, and Silver in the Banked Slalom at the 2019 World Para Snowboard World Championships in Pyhä, Finland. In 2015 he was honored as the Paralympic Austrian Sports Personality of the Year (German: Behindertensportler des Jahres).

== Biography ==
Born in Helfenberg, Upper Austria in 1987, Mayrhofer had been snowboarding since childhood. He worked as an electrician until an accident in February 2008, when he guiltless touched a 6000-volt power line, causing serious injury on his right upper leg, left forearm and right hand. On his right hand the thumb and parts of the middle finger needs to be amputated. After several unsuccessful attempts to reconstruct the function of his left hand Mayrhofer decides to amputate his left hand. His surgeon Dr. Oskar Aszmann from the University of Vienna worked close together with the prosthesis technology company Ottobock. So Mayrhofer became the first patient in the world to undergo elective amputation. His left hand was amputated around 17 cm (6.7 inches) below the elbow in July 2010. After this, he was fitted with a groundbreaking prosthesis, known as a "Michelangelo Hand", The elective amputation allows Mayrhofer to control the prosthesis in the same way as non-amputees do: EMG electrodes in the prosthesis detect muscle signals within the lower arm which can be used for prosthesis control. He can open bottles, tie shoelaces and brush his teeth within a short period of time. After the amputation, he worked closely with Ottobock's R&D department giving feedback to the engineers; in 2013 he joined the company as a product specialist in upper limb prosthesis.

== Paralympic sport ==
Visiting a prosthetics trade show in 2012, Mayrhofer saw a stall run by the Austrian Paralympic Committee, which led to him deciding to pursue para-snowboarding. At the 2015 World Para Snowboard World Championships at La Molina, Spain, Mayrhofer won the gold medal in the Banked Slalom and came fifth in snowboard cross.

In the 2018 Winter Paralympics, he competed in both snowboarding events, coming fifth in snowboard cross on 12 March but then winning the silver medal in Banked Slalom four days later.

At the 2019 World Para Snowboard World Championships at Pyhä, Finland, Mayrhofer won the silver medal in the Banked Slalom.

=== Competition history ===
Date	Location	Competition	Placing	Discipline	Class	Team	Best time	Ref
30 March 2019	Pyhä, Finland	World Championships	5	Banked Slalom	SB-UL	Austria		
27 March 2019	Pyhä, Finland	World Championships	2nd place, silver medalist(s)	Banked Slalom	SB-UL	Austria	51.43	
8 March 2019	La Molina, Spain	World Cup	3rd place, bronze medalist(s)	Banked Slalom	SB-UL	Austria	48.54	
7 March 2019	La Molina, Spain	World Cup	4	Banked Slalom	SB-UL	Austria	49.50	
5 March 2019	La Molina, Spain	World Cup	2nd place, silver medalist(s)	Snowboard Cross	SB-UL	Austria	46.20	
4 March 2019	La Molina, Spain	World Cup	3rd place, bronze medalist(s)	Snowboard Cross	SB-UL	Austria	47.25	
1 December 2018	Pyhä, Finland	World Cup	3rd place, bronze medalist(s)	Snowboard Cross	SB-UL	Austria	38.90	
30 November 2018	Pyhä, Finland	World Cup	4	Snowboard Cross	SB-UL	Austria	38.84	
15 November 2018	Landraaf, Netherlands	World Cup	1st place, gold medalist(s)	Banked Slalom	SB-UL	Austria	42.18	
14 November 2018	Landraaf, Netherlands	World Cup	1st place, gold medalist(s)	Banked Slalom	SB-UL	Austria	42.46	
13 November 2018	Landraaf, Netherlands	Continental Cup	1st place, gold medalist(s)	Banked Slalom	SB-UL	Austria	42.48	
8 November 2018	Dubai, United Arab Emirates	World Cup	1st place, gold medalist(s)	Banked Slalom	SB-UL	Austria	33.37	
7 November 2018	Dubai, United Arab Emirates	World Cup	2nd place, silver medalist(s)	Banked Slalom	SB-UL	Austria	34.94	
6 November 2018	Dubai, United Arab Emirates	Continental Cup	1st place, gold medalist(s)	Banked Slalom	SB-UL	Austria	33.74	
16 March 2018	Jeongseon, South Korea	Winter Paralympics	2nd place, silver medalist(s)	Banked Slalom	SB-UL	Austria	51.36	
12 March 2018	Jeongseon, South Korea	Winter Paralympics	5	Snowboard Cross	SB-UL	Austria	1:01.04	
8 February 2018	Big White, Canada	World Cup	3rd place, bronze medalist(s)	Banked Slalom	SB-UL	Austria	1:17.59	
16 November 2017	Landraaf, Netherlands	World Cup	3rd place, bronze medalist(s)	Banked Slalom	SB-UL	Austria	43.09	
15 November 2017	Landraaf, Netherlands	World Cup	4	Banked Slalom	SB-UL	Austria	43.87	
16 November 2017	Landraaf, Netherlands	Continental Cup	2nd place, silver medalist(s)	Banked Slalom	SB-UL	Austria	44.56	
18 November 2016	Landraaf, Netherlands	World Cup	2nd place, silver medalist(s)	Banked Slalom	SB-UL	Austriad	33.85	
17 November 2016	Landraaf, Netherlands	World Cup	2nd place, silver medalist(s)	Banked Slalom	SB-UL	Austria	34.05	
18 November 2016	Landraaf, Netherlands	World Cup	2nd place, silver medalist(s)	Banked Slalom	SB-UL	Austria	33.85	
18 November 2016	Landraaf, Netherlands	World Cup	2nd place, silver medalist(s)	Banked Slalom	SB-UL	Austria	34.07	
17 November 2016	Landraaf, Netherlands	World Cup	2nd place, silver medalist(s)	Banked Slalom	SB-UL	Austria	34.05	
16 November 2016	Landraaf, Netherlands	Continental Cup	2nd place, silver medalist(s)	Banked Slalom	SB-UL	Austria	34.07	
18 March 2016	Trentino, Italy	World Cup	1st place, gold medalist(s)	Banked Slalom	SB-UL	Austria	57.00	
17 March 2016	Trentino, Italy	World Cup	1st place, gold medalist(s)	Snowboard Cross	SB-UL	Austria	53.75	
16 March 2016	Trentino, Italy	World Cup	4	Snowboard Cross	SB-UL	Austria	56.86	
12 March 2016	Les Angles, France	World Cup	1st place, gold medalist(s)	Banked Slalom	SB-UL	Austria	1:05.60	
11 March 2016	Les Angles, France	Continental Cup	1st place, gold medalist(s)	Banked Slalom	SB-UL	Austria	1:05.39	
9 March 2016	Les Angles, France	World Cup	3rd place, bronze medalist(s)	Snowboard Cross	SB-UL	Austria	41.85	
8 March 2016	Les Angles, France	Continental Cup	2nd place, silver medalist(s)	Snowboard Cross	SB-UL	Austria	41.85	
13 February 2016	Big White, Canada	World Cup	2nd place, silver medalist(s)	Banked Slalom	SB-UL	Austria	1:03.44	
11 February 2016	Big White, Canada	World Cup	1st place, gold medalist(s)	Snowboard Cross	SB-UL	Austria	1:08.36	
10 February 2016	Big White, Canada	World Cup	1st place, gold medalist(s)	Snowboard Cross	SB-UL	Austria	1:07.83	
6 February 2016	(United States) Aspen Snowmass, USA	World Cup	1st place, gold medalist(s)	Snowboard Cross	SB-UL	Austria	38.31	
5 February 2016	(United States) Aspen Snowmass, USA	World Cup	1st place, gold medalist(s)	Snowboard Cross	SB-UL	Austria	39.49	
4 February 2016	(United States) Aspen Snowmass, USA	Continental Cup	1st place, gold medalist(s)	Snowboard Cross	SB-UL	Austria	38.76	
20 November 2015	Landraaf, Netherlands	World Cup	2nd place, silver medalist(s)	Banked Slalom	SB-UL	Austria	32.53	
19 November 2015	Landraaf, Netherlands	World Cup	2nd place, silver medalist(s)	Banked Slalom	SB-UL	Austria	32.42	
18 November 2015	Landraaf, Netherlands	Continental Cup	3rd place, bronze medalist(s)	Banked Slalom	SB-UL	Austria	32.51	
28 February 2015	La Molina, Spain	World Championships	1st place, gold medalist(s)	Banked Slalom	SB-UL	Austria	1:31.65	
24 February 2015	La Molina, Spain	World Championships	5	Snowboard Cross	SB-UL	Austria	55.32	
19 January 2015	Big White, Canada	World Cup	1st place, gold medalist(s)	Banked Slalom	SB-UL	Austria	2:26.71	
17 January 2015	Big White, Canada	World Cup	2nd place, silver medalist(s)	Snowboard Cross	SB-UL	Austria	1:12.25	
13 January 2015	(United States) Aspen Snowmass, USA	World Cup	4	Snowboard Cross	SB-UL	Austria	32.37	
12 January 2015	(United States) Aspen Snowmass, USA	World Cup	1st place, gold medalist(s)	Snowboard Cross	SB-UL	Austria	1:03.55	
20 November 2014	Landraaf, Netherlands	World Cup	1st place, gold medalist(s)	Banked Slalom	SB-UL	Austria	1.16:98	
19 November 2014	Landraaf, Netherlands	Continental Cup	3rd place, bronze medalist(s)	Banked Slalom	SB-UL	Austria	1:18.60.51	
12 February 2014	La Molina, Spain	World Cup	2nd place, silver medalist(s)	Snowboard Cross	SB-UL	Austria	1.28.43	
11 February 2014	La Molina, Spain	World Cup	1st place, gold medalist(s)	Snowboard Cross	SB-UL	Austria	1.31.34	

== Personal life ==
Mayrhofer is married.
