= Mike Minor (snowboarder) =

American Paralympic snowboarder (born 1990)

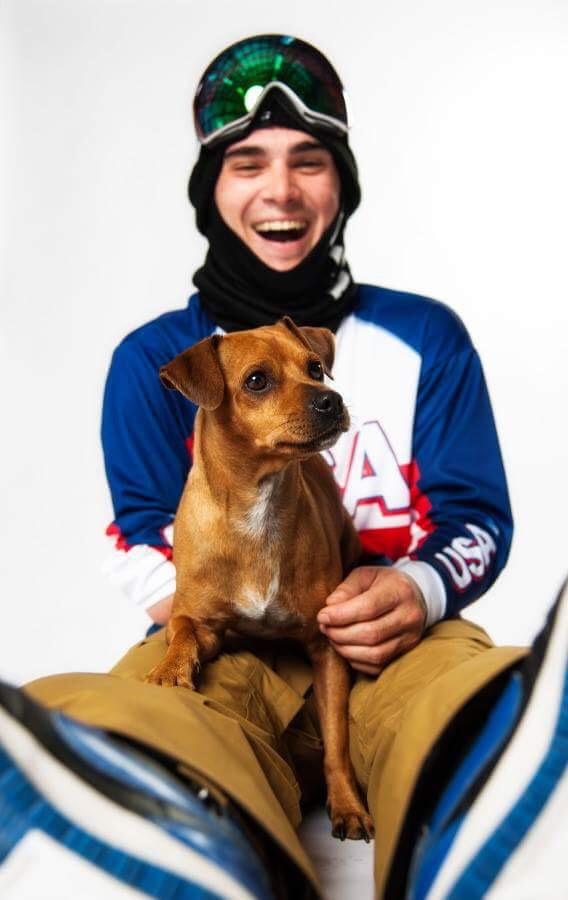

Personal information
- Full name: Michael Rexford Minor
- National team: United States
- Born: July 28, 1990 (age 35) Scranton, Pennsylvania, U.S.
- Height: 5.5 ft 0 in (168 cm)
- Weight: 150 lb (68 kg; 10 st 10 lb)

Sport
- Sport: Snowboarding (banked slalom, cross), skateboarding
- Disability class: SB-UL

Achievements and titles
- World finals: 2015 World Cup - Gold, Gold 2016 World Cup - Gold, Silver 2017 World Cup - Gold, Silver, Bronze 2017 World Championships - Gold, Silver 2018 World Cup - Gold, Gold
Medal record
Men's para snowboarding
Representing United States
Paralympic Games
Gold medal – first place	2018 PyeongChang	Banked slalom SB-UL
Bronze medal – third place	2018 PyeongChang	Snowboard cross SB-UL

Mike Minor (born July 28, 1990) is an American athlete, World Champion snowboarder, and a Paralympian who competed for the United States at the 2018 Winter Paralympics. He won gold in Snowboarding at the 2018 Winter Paralympics – Men's banked slalom and bronze in Men's snowboard cross division SB-UL. During his childhood, Minor was given a prosthetic part for his right arm. He started skiing at the age of two and snowboarding at the age of seven. He was nominated for the Best Male Athlete with a Disability ESPY Award in 2017.

== Career ==
=== Snowboarding ===
Minor entered snowboarding competitions in 2015. In 2017, he won gold in snowboard cross and silver in banked slalom for World Para Snowboard Championships in Big White, Canada. He also became a Triple Crystal Globe winner. In 2018, he won a gold and bronze medal at the 2018 Winter Paralympics.

=== Skateboarding ===
Minor won a bronze medal for skateboarding at the inaugural adaptive skatepark event at the Summer X Games 2019 in Minneapolis, Minnesota.

== Awards and accolades ==
Minor was nominated for 2 Team USA Male Athlete of the Month awards and nominated for Best Male Athlete with a Disability ESPY Award in 2017.

== Charity ==
Minor works with Adaptive Action Sports, a nonprofit organization founded by Amy Purdy and Daniel Gale, which assists athletes with disabilities to train in adaptive extreme sports.

== Personal life ==
Minor was born in Scranton, Lackawanna County, Pennsylvania.
