= Noah Elliott =

American Paralympic snowboarder (born 1997)

Personal information
- Born: July 12, 1997 (age 29) Bridgeton, Missouri, U.S.
- Height: 5 ft 9 in (175 cm)
- Weight: 165

Sport
- Sport: Snowboarding
- Disability class: SB-LL1
Medal record
Men's para snowboarding
Representing United States
Winter Paralympic Games
Gold medal – first place	2018 Pyeongchang	Banked slalom SB-LL1
Gold medal – first place	2026 Milano Cortina	Banked slalom SB-LL1
Silver medal – second place	2026 Milano Cortina	Snowboard cross SB-LL1
Bronze medal – third place	2018 Pyeongchang	Snowboard cross SB-LL1
World Championships
Silver medal – second place	2025 Big White	Snowboard cross SB-LL1
Bronze medal – third place	2025 Big White	Banked slalom SB-LL1
Gold medal – first place	2023 La Molina	Dual banked slalom SB-LL1
Silver medal – second place	2023 La Molina	Snowboard cross SB-LL1
Gold medal – first place	2021 Lillehammer	Dual banked slalom SB-LL1
Gold medal – first place	2019 Pyhä	Snowboard cross SB-LL1
Silver medal – second place	2019 Pyhä	Banked slalom SB-LL1
Bronze medal – third place	2019 Pyhä	Snowboard cross team event SB-LL1

Noah Elliott (born July 12, 1997) is an American Paralympic snowboarder. He is a three-time Paralympian and two-time Paralympic gold medalist.

== Career ==
Elliott represented the United States at the 2018 Winter Paralympics held in Pyeongchang, South Korea. He won gold in Snowboarding at the 2018 Winter Paralympics – Men's banked slalom division SB-LL1.

He won the gold medal in the men's dual banked slalom SB-LL1 event at the 2021 World Para Snow Sports Championships held in Lillehammer, Norway.

Elliott was honored with the Best Athlete with a Disability ESPY Award in 2025.

At the 2026 Winter Paralympics, Elliott won a gold and a silver medal in banked slalom SB-LL1 and snowboard cross SB-LL1 respectively.

== Personal life ==
While growing up in Missouri, Elliott dreamed of becoming a professional skateboarder. After he was diagnosed with osteosarcoma at age fifteen, his left leg was amputated above the knee. He switched to snowboarding following a chance meeting with fellow Paralympian Brenna Huckaby.

He has a daughter.
