= Maxime Montaggioni =

French para-snowboarder

Personal information
- Nationality: French
- Born: 22 August 1989 (age 36) Marseille, France
Medal record
Men's para snowboarding
Representing France
Winter Paralympic Games
Gold medal – first place	2022 Beijing	Banked slalom
World Championships
Gold medal – first place	2021 Lillehammer	Dual banked slalom
Gold medal – first place	2021 Lillehammer	Snowboard cross
Gold medal – first place	2019 Pyha	Banked slalom
Gold medal – first place	2019 Pyha	Snowboard cross
Gold medal – first place	2017 Big White	Banked slalom
Silver medal – second place	2017 Big White	Snowboard cross
Men's Para Taekwondo
Bronze medal – third place	2013 Lausanne	-68 kg

Maxime Montaggioni (born 22 August 1989) is a French para-snowboarder and parataekwondo practitioner. Born without a right hand, he competes in the SB-UL category. Montaggioni is six-time medallist at the World Para Snowboard Championships and a bronze medalist at the World Para Taekwondo Championships.

== Career ==
Montaggioni competed at the 2013 World Para Taekwondo Championships in Lausanne, winning a bronze medal in the -68 kg category. He then began his para-snowboarding career in 2015 at the international level. He distinguished himself with his first podium in the World Cup with the French team in March 2016 at the French resort "Les Angles". At the 2017 World Para Snowboard Championships held at the Big White Ski Resort, Montaggioni won his first medal, winning silver in snowboard cross event on 4 February. Three days later, he won the gold medal in the banked slalom event. He competed at the 2019 World Para Snowboard Championships, winning the gold medal in both the snowboard cross and banked slalom.

Montaggioni won the gold medal in the men's dual banked slalom at the 2021 World Para Snow Sports Championships held in Lillehammer, Norway. He also won the gold medal in the men's snowboard cross event.

He competed in snowboarding at the 2022 Winter Paralympics held in Beijing, China and won the gold medal in the banked slalom SB-UL event.
