= Mike Schultz (snowboarder) =

American Paralympian (born 1981)

Personal information
- Born: August 27, 1981 (age 44) Litchfield, Minnesota, U.S.
- Height: 5 ft 10 in (178 cm)
- Weight: 140 lb (64 kg)

Sport
- Sport: Snowboarding
- Disability class: SB-LL1
Medal record
Men's para snowboarding
Representing United States
Winter Paralympic Games
Gold medal – first place	2018 Pyeongchang	Snowboard cross
Silver medal – second place	2018 Pyeongchang	Banked slalom
Silver medal – second place	2022 Beijing	Snowboard cross
Bronze medal – third place	2026 Milano Cortina	Banked slalom

Mike Schultz (born August 27, 1981) is a Paralympic snowboarder and the founder of BioDapt Inc, a prosthetics business. He is a gold and two-time silver medalist in snowboarding at the Winter Paralympics.

== Career ==
He was the flag-bearer for the United States at the 2018 Winter Paralympics Parade of Nations. He lost his leg in 2008 in a snowmobile race. He won gold and silver in Snowboarding at the 2018 Winter Paralympics. He later won the Best Male Athlete with a Disability ESPY Award.

He won the silver medal in the men's dual banked slalom SB-LL1 event at the 2021 World Para Snow Sports Championships held in Lillehammer, Norway. He also won the silver medal in the men's snowboard cross SB-LL1 event.

He won the silver medal in the men's snowboard cross SB-LL1 event at the 2022 Winter Paralympics held in Beijing, China.
