= Jiang Zihao =

Chinese para-snowboarder (born 2002)

Personal information
- Born: 8 October 2002 (age 23) Hebei, China

Sport
- Sport: Para snowboard
- Disability class: SB-UL
Medal record
Representing China
Men's para snowboarding
Winter Paralympic Games
Bronze medal – third place	2026 Milano Cortina	Banked slalom

Jiang Zihao (born 8 October 2002) is a Chinese para-snowboarder. He is a three-time Paralympian.

== Career ==
Jiang made his Winter Paralympic Games debut for China at the 2018 Winter Paralympics. He again represented China at the 2022 Winter Paralympics.

In February 2026, he was selected to represent China at the 2026 Winter Paralympics. He won a bronze medal in the banked slalom event with a time of 57.03 seconds.
