= Matti Suur-Hamari =

Finnish para-snowboarder

Personal information
- Nationality: Finnish
- Born: 31 May 1986 (age 40) Rovaniemi
- Website: mattisuurhamari.com

Sport
- Country: Finland
- Sport: Snowboarding
- Disability class: SB-LL2
- Event: Snowboard cross
Medal record
Men's para snowboarding
Representing Finland
Winter Paralympic Games
Gold medal – first place	2018 PyeongChang	Snowboard cross
Gold medal – first place	2022 Beijing	Snowboard cross
Silver medal – second place	2022 Beijing	Banked slalom
Bronze medal – third place	2018 PyeongChang	Banked slalom
Winter X Games
Gold medal – first place	2016 Aspen	Snowboarder X Adaptive

Matti Suur-Hamari (born 31 May 1986) is a para-snowboarder. He is a three-time medalist, including two gold medals, at the Winter Paralympics.

He represented Finland at the 2014 Winter Paralympics and again at the 2018 Winter Paralympics where he served as flag-bearer in the 2018 Winter Paralympics Parade of Nations. He also competed at the 2022 Winter Paralympics.

== Career ==
He claimed his first Paralympic medal during the 2018 Winter Paralympics in Snowboarding by claiming a gold medal in the men's snowboard cross event.

He won the gold medal in the men's snowboard cross SB-LL2 event at the 2021 World Para Snow Sports Championships held in Lillehammer, Norway.

He won the gold medal in the men's snowboard cross SB-LL2 event at the 2022 Winter Paralympics held in Beijing, China. He also won the silver medal in the men's banked slalom SB-LL2 event.
