= Manuel Pozzerle =

Italian Paralympic snowboarder

Personal information
- Nationality: Italian
- Born: 4 February 1979 (age 47) Verona, Italy

Sport
- Sport: Snowboard
- Disability: Spinal cord injuries
Medal record
Men's para snowboarding
Representing Italy
Event	1st	2nd	3rd
Paralympic Games	0	1	0
World Championships	1	0	1
Total	1	1	1
Paralympic Games
Silver medal – second place	2018 PyeongChang	Snowboard cross SB-UL
World Championships
Gold medal – first place	2015 La Molina	Snowboard Cross
Bronze medal – third place	2015 La Molina	Banked Slalom

Manuel Pozzerle (born 4 February 1979) is a male Italian paralympic snowboarder who won silver medal at the 2018 Winter Paralympics.

== Achievements ==
Year	Competition	Venue	Position	Event	Notes
2018	Paralympics Games	(South Korea) Pyeongchang	2nd	Snowboard cross SB-UL	

== See also ==
- Italy at the 2018 Winter Paralympics
