= Sean Pollard =

Australian Paralympic snowboarder

Personal information
- Nationality: Australia
- Born: 22 March 1991 (age 35)

Sport
- Country: Australia
- Sport: Para-snowboarding
- Disability class: SB-UL
Medal record
Para-snowboard
Representing Australia
World Para Snowboard Championships
Bronze medal – third place	2019 Pyha	Men's Snowboard Cross UL

Sean Pollard (born 22 March 1991) is an Australian Paralympian who represented Australia in para-snowboarding at the 2018 Winter Paralympics in PyeongChang, South Korea and has been selected to compete at the 2026 Winter Paralympics.

== Personal ==
On 2 October 2014, Pollard was attacked by two sharks (possibly great whites) whilst surfing at Kelpids Beach, east of Esperance, Western Australia. He lost his left arm and right hand whilst fighting off the sharks. Before the attack he was an electrician, keen surfer and former South Bunbury footballer. In March 2015, more than $100,000 was raised by his local community in Bunbury, Western Australia to assist him on his new journey.

== Career ==
It was not until 2015 that Pollard encountered snow for the first time during a holiday in Canada. During the holiday, he tried snowboarding. After returning to Australia, he took part in an Australian Paralympic Committee specialist camp for Para-snowboarders with upper limb impairments. Pollard has mentioned that his previous surfing and skating skills have helped his transition into snowboarding.

In his first international season, he had several top 15 results including a sixth-place finish in the men's Snowboard Cross at the 2017 IPC Snowboard World Cup at Lake Tahoe, United States. At the 2016/17 IPC World Cup Finals in PyeongChang, South Korea, Pollard finished eight in the snow board cross and banked slalom.

At the 2018 Winter Paralympics, he competed in two snowboard events – fifth in the Men's Banked Slalom SB-UL and ninth in the Men's Snowboard Cross SB-UL.

At the 2019 World Para Snowboard Championships, Pyha, Finland, Pollard won the bronze medal in Men's Snowboard Cross UL and finished seventh in the Men's Banked Slalom UL.

Pollard did not compete at the 2022 Winter Paralympics as he decided to remain with his young family in Western Australia due to the States strict COVID travel restrictions.

Pollard was appointed captain of the Australian Paralympic Team at 2026 Winter Paralympics, Milano Cortina . At the 2026 Winter Paralympics, he finished 9th in the Snowboard Cross SB-UL and 12th in the Snowboard Banked SB-UL He carried the flag with Lauren Parker at the Closing Ceremony.
