= Owen Pick =

British war veteran (born 1991)

Personal information
- Nationality: British
- Born: 7 September 1991 (age 35) Cambridge, United Kingdom

Sport
- Sport: Snowboarding

Achievements and titles
- Paralympic finals: 2018
Medal record
Men's snowboarding
Representing Great Britain
Para Snowboard World Championships
Silver medal – second place	2017	SB-LL2
- Updated on 12 March 2018

Owen Pick (born 7 September 1991) is a British war veteran and snowboarder. Pick was injured in 2010 while serving in Afghanistan, losing his right leg. As part of his rehabilitation he was encouraged to try various sports. He subsequently found success in world para-snowboarding events, including representing his country in the Winter Olympics in his sport and as a flag bearer.

== Biography ==
Pick is originally from Cambridge, United Kingdom. He lost his right leg in January 2010 while serving with the British Army in Afghanistan. He had joined the Royal Anglian Regiment straight after leaving school and was 18 when he stood on an improvised explosive device (IED). The explosion caused significant damage to his leg and doctors battled to save it until Pick decided in August 2011 to have it amputated below the knee. While recovering in hospital Pick watched snowboarding for the first time. The charity Blesma gave him the chance to try wakeboarding and snowboarding and he discovered his talent on the snow in Colorado. Pick was nominated by Blesma and subsequently won the Sporting Excellence prize at the Soldiering On Awards in 2017.

== Career ==
Pick won a silver medal in the banked slalom SB-LL2 event at the 2017 Para Snowboard World Championships held at the Big White Ski Resort in Canada, followed by two podium finishes at the World Cup in La Molina, Spain.

He represented Great Britain at the 2018 Winter Paralympics, competing in Banked Slalom and SBX events alongside Ben Moore and James Barnes-Miller. Snowboarding was first added to the Paralympics in Sochi 2014, with 2018 being the first time that Great Britain has been represented. Pick describes his pride for being selected: "I feel honoured to be among the first British athletes competing in snowboard", as well as describing himself as the "least experienced snowboarder" in his category.

Pick was chosen to carry the flag at the opening ceremony, leading the 17-strong team out in the Pyeongchang Olympic Stadium. Pick was eliminated in the quarter finals of the Men's snowboard cross SB-LL2.
