= Ben Moore (snowboarder) =

British para-snowboarder (born 1986)

Personal information
- Nationality: British
- Born: 3 January 1986 (age 40)

Sport
- Country: United Kingdom
- Sport: Paralympic athletics
Medal record
Men's athletics
Representing Great Britain

Ben Moore (born 3 January 1986) is a British snowboarder. He is competing at the 2018 Winter Paralympics in snowboarding events for athletes with upper limb disabilities having lost the use of his left arm after a motorbike accident in 2006.

Moore was a keen skateboarder before he had his accident. He qualified and started work as a snowboard instructor in Canada after being inspired to take up the sport during a holiday in Bulgaria. Moore missed the bus to work one day and, rather than waiting for the next one, decided to hitchhike instead. This led to a chance encounter with competitive snowboarders who gave him the idea of competing himself. Moore began competing and achieved success when he won bronze in the banked slalom SB-UL 2017 Para Snowboard World Championships in Big White Ski Resort, Canada. He is set to represent Great Britain at the 2018 Winter Paralympics, competing in Banked Slalom and SBX events alongside Owen Pick and James Barnes-Miller. Snowboarding was first added to the Paralympics in Sochi 2014, with 2018 being the first time that Great Britain has been represented and the first time that upper limb category has been added to the events.
