= Keith Gabel =

American Paralympic snowboarder

Personal information
- Nationality: American
- Born: July 20, 1984 (age 41)
- Height: 5 ft 10 in (1.78 m)
- Weight: 181 lb (82 kg)

Sport
- Country: United States
- Sport: Snowboarding
- Disability class: SB-LL2
- Event(s): Snowboard cross, Banked slalom
Medal record
Men's para snowboarding
Representing United States
Winter Paralympic Games
Bronze medal – third place	2014 Sochi	Snowboard cross
Silver medal – second place	2018 PyeongChang	Snowboard cross
Winter X Games
Gold medal – first place	2015 Aspen	Snowboard X adaptive

Keith Gabel (born July 20, 1984) is a Paralympic snowboarder originally from Ogden, Utah.

== Career ==
Gabel competed for the United States at the 2014 Winter Paralympics and again in 2018. He won silver in 2018 snowboard cross division SB-LL2 and had won bronze in 2014. He became involved in adaptive sports after he lost his foot in 2000. He also won a silver medal in snowboard cross at the 2016–17 IPC Snowboard World Cup. He won silver medal from South Korea at the 2018 Winter Paralympics.
