= Evan Strong =

American Para-snowboard cross racer (born 1986)

Evan Rees Strong
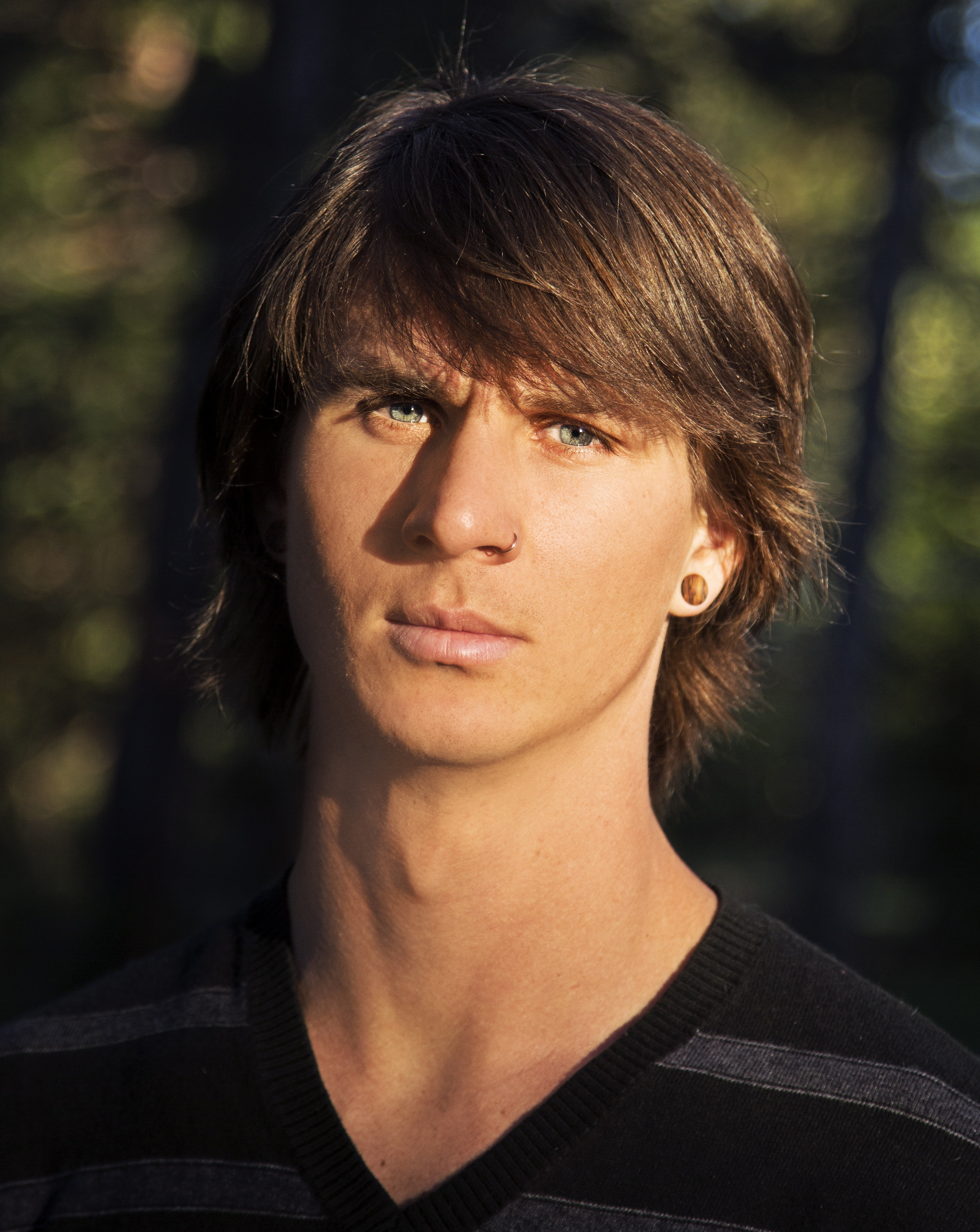
- 2014 Paralympic Gold Medalist 2018 Paralympic Silver Medalist

Personal information
- Born: November 13, 1986 (age 39) San Francisco, California, U.S.
- Height: 5 ft 11 in (180 cm)
- Website: www.strongevan.com

Skiing career
- Sport: Alpine skiing
- Disciplines: Para-Snowboard Cross Para-Banked Slalom

Paralympics
- Teams: USA 2014 Gold Medal USA 2018 Silver Medal USA 2018 4th place

World Cup
- Seasons: 2012, 2013, 2014,2015,2016,2017
- Wins: 10
- Podiums: 29
- Overall titles: 2011, 2012, 2013 1st, 2014 2nd
- Discipline titles: 2012 world champion
Medal record
Men's para snowboarding
Representing United States
Winter Paralympic Games
Gold medal – first place	2014 Sochi	Snowboard cross
Silver medal – second place	2018 Pyeongchang	Banked slalom SB-LL2
- Updated on Jan 01, 2020

Evan Strong (born November 13, 1986) is an American Para-snowboard cross racer who began his career in 2008. He is the gold medalist in para snowboard cross at the 2014 Winter Paralympics in Sochi, Russia and led the USA team to a sweep of the podium. He went on to represent Team USA in the 2018 Winter Paralympics in Pyeongchang, South Korea and won a silver medal in the banked slalom event.

== Career ==
Strong won the men's para-snowboard World Championship title in 2012. Strong is the winter X-Games 15 gold medalist in adaptive boarder cross. He has 29 podiums and ten world cup gold medals in para-snowboard cross WFS and IPC World Cup races. Strong is the gold medal winner in para snowboard cross at the 2014 Paralympics in Sochi, Russia and lead the USA team to a sweep of the podium. He is also competed in the 2018 Paralympic games in South Korea, placing 2nd in banked slalom and 4th in snowboard cross.

== Personal life ==
Evan Strong was born in San Francisco, California, to Dr. Roger Edward Strong, of Glastonbury, Connecticut, and Lisa Anne Rees Strong, of Pasadena, California. Strong is the second of the three children in his family, with an older sister, Stephanie (b. June 3, 1983) and younger sister, Arianna (b. Sept. 30, 1991). He moved to Maine in 1988 where he had his first introduction to snow. He moved to Maui, Hawaii in 1995, where he lived until 2006. While in Hawaii he pursued his interest in skateboarding with the desire to become a professional skateboarder. He married Mariah Fulcher (b. Dec. 7, 1991) also of Maui, Hawaii on Oct. 2, 2010 in Keanae, Maui. He and Mariah welcomed their first daughter, Indie Arrow, on January 27, 2015. On March 13, 2019 the family welcomed their second daughter Isla Sōl. Both of his daughters were born at home.

The family splits their year between Maui and Nevada City, California.

== Accident and recovery ==
On November 3, 2004, shortly before his eighteenth birthday, while riding a motorcycle, Strong was hit by a speeding oncoming car which resulted in the amputation of his left leg below the knee. Strong was first fitted for a prosthetic leg by Mike Norell of Norell Prosthetics in Mountain View, California. Strong was helped in his recovery by organizations including Challenged Athletes Foundation and Adaptive Action Sports to relearn to skateboard, bicycle and snowboard. In January 2007, Strong attempted to snowboard for the first time at Sun Valley, Idaho. In October 2007, Strong moved to Truckee, California to work at Northstar-at-Tahoe resort and became very proficient at snowboarding with a prosthetic.

== World cup adaptive and para snowboard competition ==
Strong began competing in adaptive snowboard competitions in April 2008 at the WSF adaptive snowboard world championships at Copper Mountain, Colorado. On February 3 and 4, 2011 Evan joined para-snowboarders from seven countries to compete in two world cup races in Orcieres, France. Strong won first place on both days. On 18 August 2011 Strong won first place at the para-snowboard world cup in Wānaka, New Zealand. On April 8 and 9, 2011 Strong won two world cup races at Lake Louise Ski Resort, British Columbia. On February 3 and 4, 2012 Strong competed in the 2012 para-snowboard world championships at Orcieres, France and won first place. On April 2 and 3, 2012 Strong won two world cup races in Nakiska, British Columbia finishing the season in first place for world cup races.

In 2022, he won the bronze medal in the men's snowboard cross SB-LL2 event at the 2021 World Para Snow Sports Championships held in Lillehammer, Norway.

== Paralympic career ==
Strongs first introduction to the paralympics came in 2010 when he was invited to perform a skateboard exhibition at the opening ceremonies of the 2010 paralympics in Vancouver, British Columbia. His hope at the time was that his sport could become a paralympic sport as well. On 2 May 2012 the International Paralympic Committee announced that para-snowboard would debut at the 2014 Winter Paralympics in Sochi, Russia opening up the opportunity for Strong to compete at the paralympic level. During the 2012–13 season Strong won IPC Noram qualifier races at Sierra-at-Tahoe, California on 27 January 2013, second at Copper Mountain, Colorado on 3 February 2013. On 6 March 2013 Strong competed in the Paralympic test event in Sochi, Russia with racers from eleven nations and won first place. In World Cup Competition Evan took third in Maribor, Slovenia 8 March 2013, and a first and second at Kelowna, British Columbia on 28 & 29 March 2013. Strong finished the season tied for first place along with Carl Murphy of Wānaka, New Zealand. On 4 April 2013 Strong won the para-snowboard cross USASA para-snowboard nationals at Copper Mountain, Colorado. It was announced on 7 May 2013 that Strong was nominated to the USA paralympic snowboard team to compete at the 2014 Winter paralympic games in Sochi, Russia. Strong kicked off the 2013-14 world cup season with a silver and gold at Copper Mountain, CO on January 18 & 19, 2014. Strong finished the 2013-14 World Cup season with two gold, there silver and one bronze place, finishing the world cup season in second place overall behind teammate Mike Shea. On March 14, 2014 Strong won the gold medal in para snowboard cross at the 2014 Paralympics in Sochi, Russia and lead the USA team of Mike Shea and Keith Gabel to a sweep of the podium.

== Athletic interests ==
In addition to snowboarding Strong competes in downhill mountain bike racing. He won the sport division of the 6th annual Live Wire classic at Northstar-at-Tahoe, CA September 2, 2012. Strong also competed in skateboarding at the 2007 Extremity Games, at the ESPN Summer X-Games, and at the Life Rolls On "They Will Skate Again" in Venice Beach, CA taking second place in 2011 and 2012. In the summer of 2019 he competed in the Summer X-games for skateboarding at placed 4th. One of Strong's favorite training techniques is lifting kettlebells. His coach is Eric Kenyon of Form Is Function. Strong also enjoys rock climbing, archery and slack lining.

Evan is an avid big-wave surfer. He surfed throughout his youth in Maui, HI. He has competed in multiple adaptive surf competitions in the between 2016 and 2019.

== Food and lifestyle ==
Outside of sport, Strong owned a restaurant and worked as a raw food chef in an open teaching kitchen. In 2009, Strong along with his wife Mariah and sisters Stephanie and Arianna opened the restaurant THE FIX for foodies in Nevada City, California which was featured in the Tahoe Quarterly, July 18, 2013. The restaurant has hosted teachers which have helped Strong in his recovery and training including David Wolfe and Daniel Vitalis. Strong was featured in the film "The Raw Natural" which was released April 21, 2012 by Rachel Prince. The film highlights the use of nutrition by professional athletes for performance and recovery. The restaurant closed in Oct. of 2014.

== Non-profit and charitable work ==
Evan works with non profit organizations to raise money to help other challenged athletes by participating in events such as the San Diego Triathlon Challenge and Million Dollar Challenge put on by Challenged Athletes Foundation. He is also an advocate for Adaptive Action Sports of Frisco, Colorado where he teaches at learn to skateboard and learn to snowboard clinics. Strong an AASI Adaptive snowboard instructor has taught snowboarding to injured veterans with Disabled Sports USA at The Hartford Ski Spectacular at Breckenridge, Colorado in 2010.

== Recognition and awards ==
In January 2013 Strong was nominated by the International Paralympic Committee for paralympic athlete of the month. He was narrowly defeated in the online voting by Kozo Kubo of Japan. Strong has been invited to USOC & NBC promotional shoots in Hollywood, CA and New York, NY for the 2014 Olympic and Paralympic games. On July 21, 2013 Strong was recognized at the Institute of Noetic Sciences 15th international conference and received the Temple Award for creative altruism.

== Sponsors ==
- Strong joins the Nike Team 2017
- Strong joins the Bridgestone Team 2017
- Strong joins the Toyota Team 2017
- Strong named to The Hartford's team of U.S. paralympic ambassadors November 20, 2013
- Donek Snowboards provides Strong with custom built snowboards.
- Prosthetic and Orthotic Associates provides Strong with prosthetic services.
- Surthrival
- Adaptive Action Sports
- Challenges Athletes Foundation
- Form Is Function
- Chicago Sports & Entertainment Partners represent Strong.
