= Para snowboard classification =

Classification system for Para snowboard

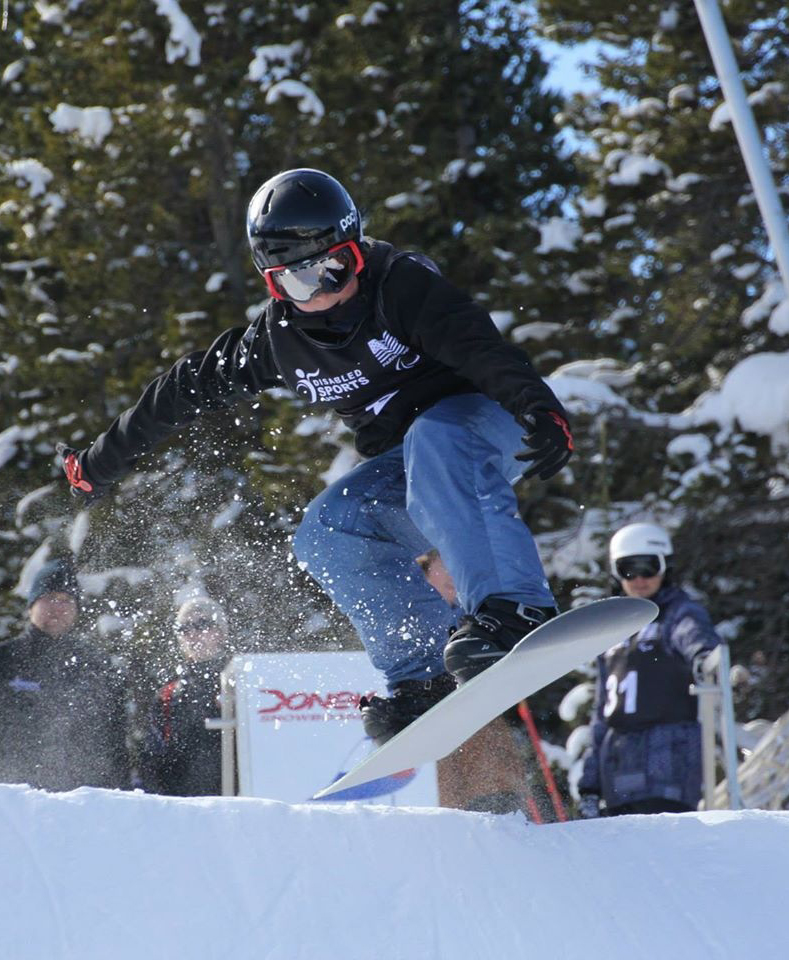
Australian Paralympic snowboarder Ben Tudhope. At age 14, he was the youngest competitor at the 2014 Winter Paralympic Games from any country.

Para snowboard classification is the classification system for Para snowboard. The sport, initially called Adaptive Snowboarding is now practiced by hundreds of athletes worldwide. The International Paralympic Committee (IPC) defines three classes: SB-LL for athletes with a physical impairment affecting one or both legs (with SB-LL1 and SB-LL2 for more- and less-severe impairment), and SB-UL for athletes with a physical impairment affecting one or both arms who compete standing. The sport made its official Winter Paralympic debut in the 2014 Winter Paralympics in Sochi, Russia.

== Eligibility ==
Classifications exist for deaf competitors, blind competitors, people with physical disabilities, and those with intellectual disabilities. The IPC eligibility rules provide for athletes with a physical impairment such as limb loss or limb deficiency, spinal cord injury, nerve damage, or cerebral palsy. As of 2018, athletes with other impairments, such as visual impairments, are not eligible. The IPC defined two competition classes in 2014:

- SB-LL is for athletes with a physical impairment affecting one or both legs. Athletes may use a prosthesis or modified equipment to compete.
- SB-UL is for athletes with a physical impairment affecting one or both arms who compete standing.

For the 2018 Winter Paralympics in PyeongChang, South Korea, the IPC divided the SB-LL category in twain:

- SB-LL1 is for athletes with significant impairment to one leg, such as amputation above the knee or "a significant combined impairment in two legs," affecting their balance, board control, and ability to navigate uneven terrain.
- SB-LL2 is for athletes with an impairment to one or both legs "with less activity limitation," such as below-knee amputation.
- SB-UL is for athletes whose upper limb impairments affect balance. There were no events for female athletes in the category SB-UL in the 2018 games.

The World Snowboard Federation (WSF) has a more elaborate classification system, with classes SB1 to SB12 for snowboarders with limb disabilities:

- SB1 is for athletes with severe disabilities in both lower limbs
- SB2 is for athletes with severe disabilities in one lower limb
- SB3 is for athletes with moderate disabilities in both lower limbs
- SB4 is for athletes with moderate disabilities in one lower limb
- SB5 is for athletes with disabilities in both upper limbs
- SB6 is for athletes with disabilities in one upper limb
- SB9 is for athletes with disabilities in one upper and one lower limb
- SB10 sitting class for athletes with disabilities in both lower limbs and trunk
- SB11 sitting class for athletes with disabilities in both lower limbs and partial trunk function
- SB12 sitting class for athletes with disabilities in lower limbs and good trunk function

The WSF also defines three visual impairment classes, B1, B2, and B3, identical to those used by the International Blind Sports Federation (IBSA) for other sports for visually impaired athletes.

== Governance ==
The sport, widely called Adaptive Snowboarding, held its first official competition at the 2000 USASA Nationals in Waterville Valley NH, USA. The USASA governed adaptive snowboarding competitions in North America through 2008, after which the World Snowboard Federation accepted international governance beginning in 2009. It is now practiced by hundreds of athletes worldwide, and governed by the International Paralympic Committee (IPC). The IPC and the WSF signed a memorandum of understanding in July 2009, under which the WSF would continue to govern the sport until 2014, after which the situation would be reassessed. Both organisations would continue their efforts to develop the sport. IPC Alpine Skiing governs snowboarding and alpine skiing, and the two share a common set of regulations. In explaining the change of the name of the sport, the WSF stated that:

The change was made to bring the sport into alignment with the common terminology for sports (except sledge hockey and wheelchair curling, which are not referred to as "para-hockey" and "para-curling") used by the International Paralympic Committee (IPC). This was done in consultation with the IPC and is part of the process of preparing the sport for inclusion in the Paralympic Winter Games.

The prefix "para" is of Greek origin, and means "alongside," It is used to illustrate how the Olympic and Paralympic movements exist side by side.

Para snowboard and Adaptive Snowboarding do not necessarily refer to the same thing, though both are practised by people with disabilities. The new name describes competitive adaptive snowboarding and its acceptance into the Paralympic movement.

For Australian competitors in this sport, the sport and classification are managed by the national sports federation with support from the Australian Paralympic Committee. There are three types of classification available for Australian competitors: Provisional, national, and international. The first is for club-level competitions, the second for state and national competitions, and the third for international competitions.

== At the Paralympic Games ==
After initially rejecting the sport in August 2011, the International Paralympic Committee changed its mind and added Para snowboard to the Alpine Skiing programme on 2 May 2012. The President of the Sochi 2014 Olympic Organizing Committee, Dmitry Chernyshenko, welcomed the addition of the new sport, saying:

Snowboarding is a young and exciting sport and one which is attracting new audiences and participants everywhere. Its inclusion in the Paralympics programme will give a further boost to the promotion of Paralympic sports across Russia and highlight the opportunities that sport provides everyone.

The sport made its official Winter Paralympic debut in the 2014 Winter Paralympics in Sochi, Russia. There were men's and women's standing snowboard cross. Only events in the SB-LL class were offered. The events were run in a time-trial format (one rider on the course at a time); unlike other Paralympic events, results were calculated without factors that adjust times based on disability classification. Each athlete got three runs through jumps, bumps, and turns. Times from the best two were added together for their final total.

Both events were run on 14 March 2014. The women's event was won by Bibian Mentel-Spee from the Netherlands in a time of 1 minute 57.43 seconds. France's Cécile Hernandez came second with 2 minutes 07.31 seconds. America's Amy Purdy came third in 2 minutes 14.29 seconds. The men's event was a clean sweep for the United States. Evan Strong won in 1 minute 43.61 seconds, followed by Michael Shea with a time of 1:44.18 and Keith Gabel with a time of 1:47.10.

== Future ==
The snowboarding cross events at Sochi were a success, with tickets for Para snowboard events being among the first to sell out. In April 2014, the IPC announced plans to add slalom to the events at the 2018 Winter Paralympics in Pyeongchang, South Korea. Consideration was also given to having the snowboard cross event run with pairs of athletes competing against each other rather than as a time trial. There were still no plans to add non-standing or visually impaired events. As of 2014, visually impaired events were not considered medal events at WSF Para-Snowboard competitions due to the small numbers of internationally competitive athletes.
