= Para snowboard =

Winter parasport

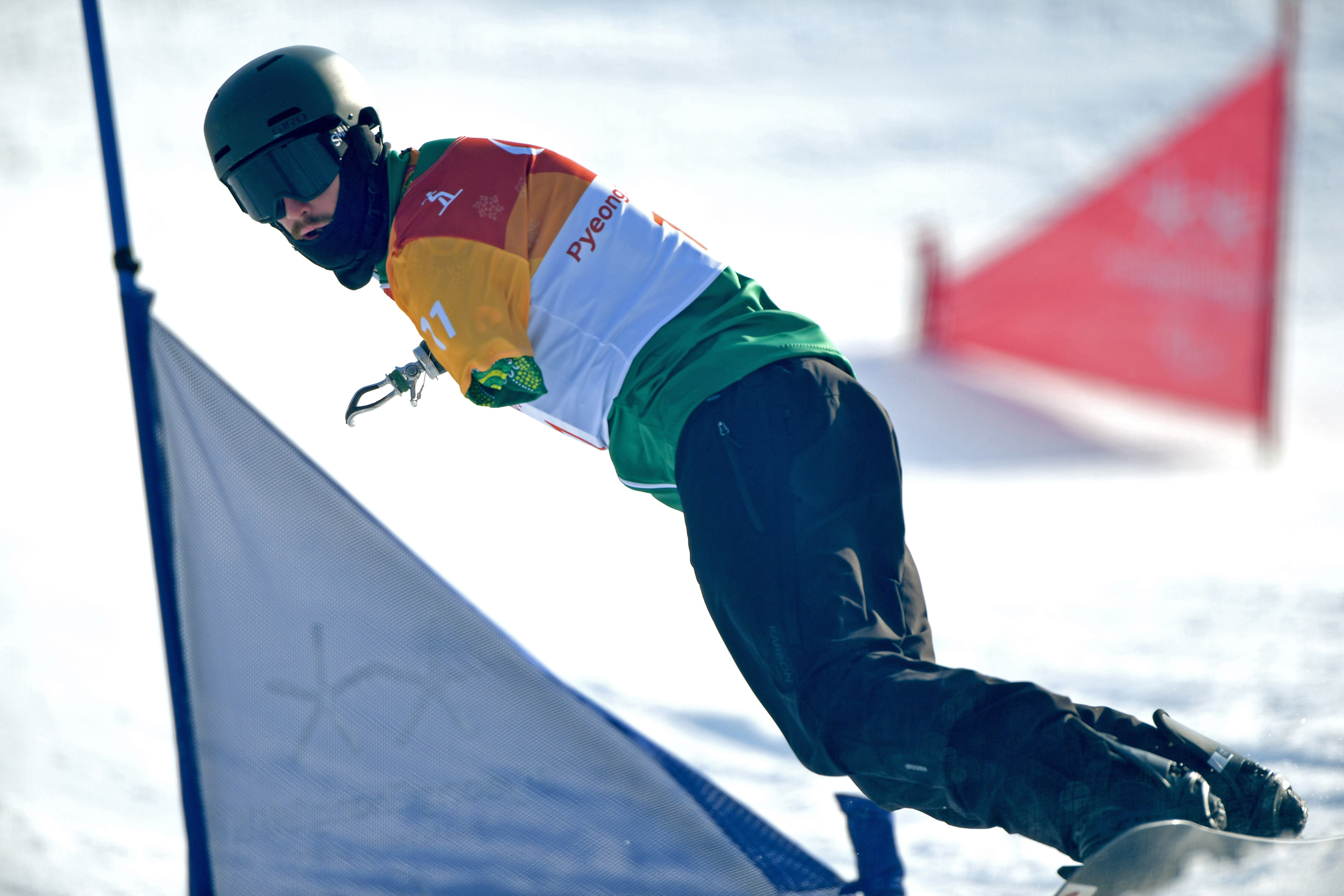
- Para snowboarder Sean Pollard competing at the 2018 Paralympics
- Highest governing body: International Ski and Snowboard Federation (FIS)

Characteristics
- Contact: No
- Team members: Single competitors or teams
- Mixed-sex: Yes
- Type: Outdoor
- Equipment: Snowboard; bindings; boots; helmet; goggles; snowsuit
- Venue: Ski area or dry ski slope
- Glossary: Glossary of skiing and snowboarding terms

Presence
- Country or region: Worldwide
- World Championships: Since 2015
- Paralympic: Since 2014

Para snowboard is a winter sport consisting of racing down a snow-covered surface while standing or sitting on a snowboard. An adaptation of snowboarding for athletes with physical impairments in different classifications, it is governed by the International Ski and Snowboard Federation (FIS). The parasport comprises five events: snowboard cross, team snowboard cross, banked slalom, dual banked slalom, and giant slalom.

At the Winter Paralympic Games, Para snowboard events were included as part of the Para alpine skiing programme in 2014, and has been its own Paralympic sport since 2018. The World Para Snowboard Championships were held for the first time in 2015.

== History ==
In the 1600s, residents in the Kaçkar Mountains of Turkey used lazboards, rectangular boards with a rope attached to the front, for traversing snow. Around the same time, miners in Austria made use of a similar board called the Knappenross. In 1965, the Snurfer was developed as the precursor of the modern snowboard, initially made from binding two skis. Snowboarding then rose in popularity in the late 20th century and it was included as an Olympic sport starting with the 1998 Paralympics, partly due to its appeal to a younger demographic.

Formerly called adaptive snowboard, Para snowboard was governed by the World Snowboard Federation (WSF) until 2010, when a memorandum of understanding was signed to transfer governance to World Para Snowboard in collaboration with the WSF to continue the sport's development. At the time, World Para Snowboard also worked with the International Ski and Snowboard Federation (FIS) on various technical aspects. Since July 2022, the sport is governed by the FIS, as is Para alpine skiing and Para cross-country skiing. According to the International Paralympic Committee (IPC), "Para" should always be capitalised and followed by a space.

== Classification ==
As of 1 October 2022, the IPC recognises three classifications, which is conducted by officials certified by the FIS:

- SB-LL1: more significant impairments in at least one leg. Athletes may use prostheses.
- SB-LL2: less significant impairments in at least one leg.
- SB-UL: impairments in at least one arm.

People with impairments in both upper and lower limbs can choose to be assessed for either an upper- or a lower-limb impairment.

== Events ==
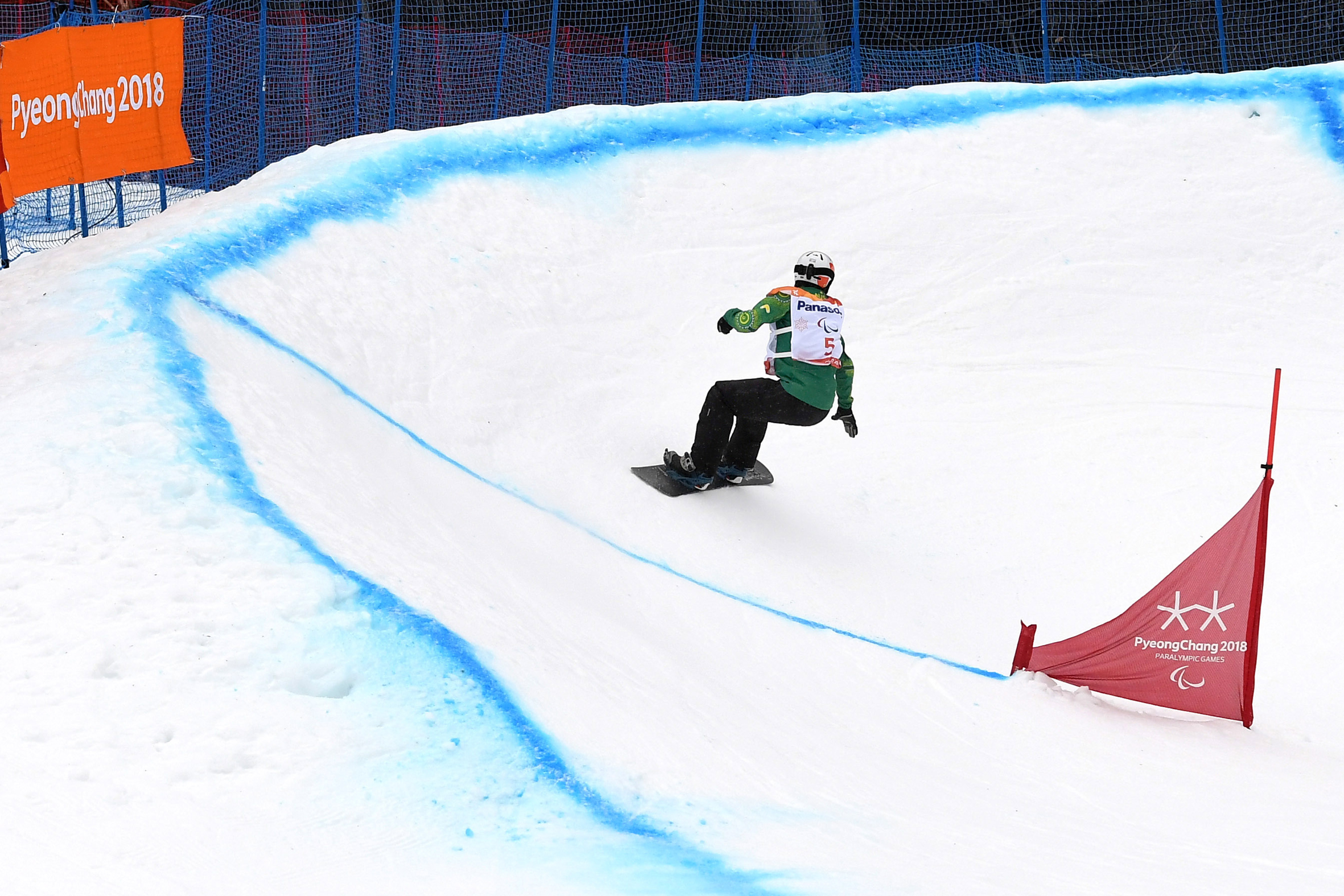
Simon Patmore competing in a banked slalom event at the 2018 Paralympics

The FIS describes the following five events:

- Snowboard cross (SBX)
- Team snowboard cross
- Banked slalom
- Dual banked slalom
- Giant slalom

== Competitions ==
The FIS sanctions Para snowboard competitions at three levels: global, continental, and national. The first level consists of the Paralympic Winter Games, the World Para Snowboard Championships, and the Para Snowboard World Cup. The second level of competitions comprises five Para Snowboard Continental Cups—the European Cup (EC), the North American Cup (NAC), the South American Cup (SAC), the Asian Cup (AC), and the Australia New Zealand Cup (ANC)—as well as the FISU World University Games. The third level includes national championships and FIS races.

=== Paralympic Games ===
Athletes have campaigned to have Para snowboard included at the Paralympic Games since at least the early 2000s, and the sport was rejected from the 2010 Winter Paralympics. In May 2012, the decision was made to include Para snowboard events at the 2014 Paralympics, as part of the Para alpine skiing programme. Para snowboard has been its own Paralympic sport since the 2018 Paralympics, with the programme consisting of men's and women's events in banked slalom and snowboard cross.

As of 2022, Brenna Huckaby from the United States is the most decorated female Paralympic snowboarder, with three gold medals and four total medals. Matti Suur-Hamari from Finland is the most decorated male Paralympic snowboarder, with two gold medals and four total medals. The most successful nation in Para snowboard is the United States, with a total of 21 medals (7 gold, 8 silver, 6 bronze).

== Risks ==
A study of 567 athletes at the 2022 Paralympics found the highest incidence rate of injury to be among those competing in Para snowboard, especially in competitors' lower limbs and the head and neck area.
