= 2022 Winter Paralympics Parade of Nations =

Parade of Nations during the opening ceremony of the 2022 Winter Paralympics

During the Parade of Nations within the Beijing 2022 Winter Paralympics opening ceremony on March 4, athletes and officials from each participating country marched in the Beijing National Stadium, preceded by their flag and placard bearer bearing the respective country's name. Each flag bearer was chosen either by the nation's National Paralympic Committee or by the team of athletes themselves.

== Parade order ==
Nations marched in the order of the host language, Simplified Chinese. China entered last as host, and Italy entered second-to-last as upcoming host.

As Chinese characters do not have an alphabetical order, they were sorted based on stroke count. Specifically:

- Characters with fewer strokes march earlier, so New Zealand (新西兰) marched before Mexico (墨西哥) because 新 has 13 strokes and 墨 has 15 strokes.
- If the initial characters have the same number of strokes, then the stroke orders of the two characters are grouped in the order 橫竖撇捺折 (horizontal/vertical/left falling/right falling/fold). For example, Denmark (丹麦) marched before Brazil (巴西) because 丹 has four strokes in the order ㇓㇆㇔㇐ (3541), while 巴 has four strokes in the order ㇕丨㇐㇟ (5215).
  - The second characters are not compared, even though 麦 has more strokes than 西.
- While it is possible to have a pair of characters with the same stroke count and the same stroke order groups, this did not occur during the parade. If the initial characters are identical, the second characters of each nation are used, and so on.

== Countries and flag bearers ==
The following is a list of each country's flag bearer. The list is sorted by the sequence that each nation appeared in the Parade of Nations. The names are given in their official designations by the IPC, and the Chinese names follow their official designations by the Beijing Organizing Committee for the 2022 Olympic and Paralympic Winter Games.

Order	Nation	Chinese name	Pinyin	Flag bearer	Sport/Function	Ref.
1	Belgium (BEL)	比利时	Bǐlìshí	Rémi Mazi	Alpine skiing	
2	Japan (JPN)	日本	Rìběn	Taiki Kawayoke	Cross-country skiing	
3	Denmark (DEN)	丹麦	Dānmài	Games Volunteer	—N/a	
4	Ukraine (UKR)	乌克兰	Wūkèlán	Maksym Yarovyi	Biathlon	
5	Brazil (BRA)	巴西	Bāxī	Aline Rocha	Cross-country skiing	
5	Brazil (BRA)	巴西	Bāxī	Cristian Ribera	Cross-country skiing	
6	Israel (ISR)	以色列	Yǐsèliè	Games Volunteer	—N/a	
7	Canada (CAN)	加拿大	Jiānádà	Ina Forrest	Wheelchair curling	
7	Canada (CAN)	加拿大	Jiānádà	Greg Westlake	Para ice hockey	
8	Spain (ESP)	西班牙	Xībānyá	Víctor González Fernández	Snowboarding	
9	Liechtenstein (LIE)	列支敦士登	Lièzhīdūnshìdēng	Sarah Hundert	Alpine skiing	
10	Iran (IRI)	伊朗	Yīlǎng	Elaheh Gholifallah	Cross-country skiing	
11	Hungary (HUN)	匈牙利	Xiōngyálì	Richard Dumity	Alpine skiing	
12	Iceland (ISL)	冰岛	Bīngdǎo	Hilmar Orvarsson	Alpine skiing	
13	Andorra (AND)	安道尔	Āndàoěr	Games Volunteer	—N/a	
14	Finland (FIN)	芬兰	Fēnlán	Inkki Inola	Cross-country skiing	
14	Finland (FIN)	芬兰	Fēnlán	Maiju Laurila	Alpine skiing	
15	Croatia (CRO)	克罗地亚	Kèluódìyà	Bruno Bošnjak	Snowboarding	
16	Greece (GRE)	希腊	Xīlà	Evangelia Nikou	Alpine skiing	
16	Greece (GRE)	希腊	Xīlà	Konstantinos Petrakis	Snowboarding	
17	Argentina (ARG)	阿根廷	Āgēntíng	Enrique Plantey	Alpine skiing	
18	Azerbaijan (AZE)	阿塞拜疆	Āsāibàijiāng	Mehman Ramazanzade	Cross-country skiing	
19	Latvia (LAT)	拉脱维亚	Lātuōwéiyà	Ojars Briedis	Wheelchair curling	
19	Latvia (LAT)	拉脱维亚	Lātuōwéiyà	Poļina Rožkova	Wheelchair curling	
20	Great Britain (GBR)	英国	Yīngguó	Gregor Ewan	Wheelchair curling	
20	Great Britain (GBR)	英国	Yīngguó	Meggan Dawson-Farrell	Wheelchair curling	
21	Romania (ROU)	罗马尼亚	Luōmǎníyà	Mihăiță Papară	Snowboarding	
21	Romania (ROU)	罗马尼亚	Luōmǎníyà	Laura Văleanu	Alpine skiing	
22	France (FRA)	法国	Fǎguó	Benjamin Daviet	Biathlon; Cross-country skiing	
23	Poland (POL)	波兰	Bōlán	Andrzej Szczesny	Alpine skiing	
24	Puerto Rico (PUR)	波多黎各	Bōduō Lígè	Orlando Pérez	Alpine skiing	
25	Bosnia and Herzegovina (BIH)	波黑	Bōhēi	Jovica Goreta	Alpine skiing	
25	Bosnia and Herzegovina (BIH)	波黑	Bōhēi	Ilma Kazazić	Alpine skiing	
26	Norway (NOR)	挪威	Nuówēi	Sissel Løchen	Wheelchair curling	
26	Norway (NOR)	挪威	Nuówēi	Kjartan Haugen	Cross-country skiing	
27	Kazakhstan (KAZ)	哈萨克斯坦	Hāsàkèsītǎn	Yerbol Khamitov	Biathlon	
28	United States (USA)	美国	Měiguó	Tyler Carter	Alpine skiing	
28	United States (USA)	美国	Měiguó	Danelle Umstead	Alpine skiing	
29	Netherlands (NED)	荷兰	Hélán	Lisa Bunschoten	Snowboarding	
29	Netherlands (NED)	荷兰	Hélán	Chris Vos	Snowboarding	
30	Georgia (GEO)	格鲁吉亚	Gélǔjíyà	Temuri Dadiani	Cross-country skiing	
31	Estonia (EST)	爱沙尼亚	Aìshāníyà	Signe Falkenberg	Wheelchair curling	
31	Estonia (EST)	爱沙尼亚	Aìshāníyà	Mait Mätas	Wheelchair curling	
32	Czech Republic (CZE)	捷克	Jiékè	Zdeněk Krupička	Para ice hockey	
33	Slovenia (SLO)	斯洛文尼亚	Sīluòwénníyà	Jernej Slivnik	Alpine skiing	
34	Slovakia (SVK)	斯洛伐克	Sīluòfákè	Miroslav Haraus	Alpine skiing	
34	Slovakia (SVK)	斯洛伐克	Sīluòfákè	Monika Kunkelová	Wheelchair curling	
35	South Korea (KOR)	韩国	Hánguó	Baek Hye-jin	Wheelchair curling	
36	Chile (CHI)	智利	Zhìlì	Nicolás Bisquertt	Alpine skiing	
37	Austria (AUT)	奥地利	Aòdìlì	Barbara Aigner	Alpine skiing	
37	Austria (AUT)	奥地利	Aòdìlì	Markus Salcher	Alpine skiing	
38	Switzerland (SUI)	瑞士	Ruìshì	Hans Burgener	Wheelchair curling	
38	Switzerland (SUI)	瑞士	Ruìshì	Romy Tschopp	Snowboarding	
39	Sweden (SWE)	瑞典	Ruìdiǎn	Viljo Petersson-Dahl	Wheelchair curling	
39	Sweden (SWE)	瑞典	Ruìdiǎn	Kristina Ulander	Wheelchair curling	
40	Mongolia (MGL)	蒙古	Měnggǔ	Batmönkhiin Ganbold	Cross-country skiing	
41	New Zealand (NZL)	新西兰	Xīn Xīlán	Games Volunteer	—N/a	
42	Mexico (MEX)	墨西哥	Mòxīgē	Arly Velásquez	Alpine skiing	
43	Germany (GER)	德国	Déguó	Martin Fleig	Biathlon	
43	Germany (GER)	德国	Déguó	Anna-Lena Forster	Alpine skiing	
44	Australia (AUS)	澳大利亚	Àodàlìyǎ	Melissa Perrine	Alpine skiing	
44	Australia (AUS)	澳大利亚	Àodàlìyǎ	Mitchell Gourley	Alpine skiing	
45	Italy (ITA)	意大利	Yìdàlì	Giacomo Bertagnolli	Alpine skiing	
46	China (CHN)	中国	Zhōngguó	Guo Yujie	Biathlon	
46	China (CHN)	中国	Zhōngguó	Wang Zhidong	Para ice hockey	

== See also ==
- 2022 Winter Olympics Parade of Nations
