= Snowboard at the 2022 Winter Paralympics – Men's banked slalom =

Men's banked slalom at the XIII Paralympic Winter Games
- Paralympic snowboarding
- Venue: Genting Snow Park
- Dates: 11 March

Men's banked slalom SB-LL1 at the XIII Paralympic Winter Games
- Competitors: 16 from 11 nations

Medalists
1st place, gold medalist(s)		Wu Zhongwei	China
2nd place, silver medalist(s)		Chris Vos	Netherlands
3rd place, bronze medalist(s)		Tyler Turner	Canada

Men's banked slalom SB-LL2 at the XIII Paralympic Winter Games
- Competitors: 25 from 13 nations

Medalists
1st place, gold medalist(s)		Qi Sun	China
2nd place, silver medalist(s)		Matti Suur-Hamari	Finland
3rd place, bronze medalist(s)		Ollie Hill	Great Britain

Men's banked slalom UL at the XIII Paralympic Winter Games
- Competitors: 17 from 9 nations

Medalists
1st place, gold medalist(s)		Maxime Montaggioni	France
2nd place, silver medalist(s)		Ji Lijia	China
3rd place, bronze medalist(s)		Zhu Yonggang	China

The men's banked slalom competition of the 2022 Winter Paralympics was held at Genting Snow Park on 11 March 2022.

== Medal table ==
Rank	Nation	Gold	Silver	Bronze	Total
1	China (CHN)*	2	1	1	4
2	France (FRA)	1	0	0	1
3	Finland (FIN)	0	1	0	1
3	Netherlands (NED)	0	1	0	1
5	Canada (CAN)	0	0	1	1
5	Great Britain (GBR)	0	0	1	1
Totals (6 entries)		3	3	3	9

== Banked slalom SB-LL1 ==
Rank	Bib	Name	Country	Run 1	Run 2	Best
1st place, gold medalist(s)	29	Wu Zhongwei	China	1:09.73	1:10.77	1:09.73
2nd place, silver medalist(s)	19	Chris Vos	Netherlands	1:12.08	1:12.06	1:12.06
3rd place, bronze medalist(s)	26	Tyler Turner	Canada	1:14.00	1:12.84	1:12.84
4	22	Noah Elliott	United States	1:13.06	1:12.87	1:12.87
5	23	Mike Schultz	United States	1:13.64	1:12.89	1:12.89
6	25	Liu Kaiyang	China	1:13.29	1:13.44	1:13.29
7	27	Daichi Oguri	Japan	1:15.55	1:14.42	1:14.42
8	33	Liu Yiyang	China	1:16.80	1:15.08	1:15.08
9	24	Bruno Bošnjak	Croatia	1:15.68	1:15.68	1:15.68
10	28	Junta Kosuda	Japan	1:16.32	DNF	1:16.32
11	31	Christian Schmiedt	Germany	1:20.36	1:24.87	1:20.36
12	18	Rene Eckhart	Austria	1:22.12	1:20.82	1:20.82
13	32	André Barbieri	Brazil	1:43.86	1:22.18	1:22.18
14	21	Tyler Burdick	United States	1:23.53	1:22.94	1:22.94
15	20	Mihăiță Papară	Romania	1:24.29	1:29.52	1:24.29
16	30	Tomi Taskinen	Finland	1:49.32	DNF	1:49.32

== Banked slalom SB-LL2 ==
Rank	Bib	Name	Country	Run 1	Run 2	Best
1st place, gold medalist(s)	45	Sun Qi	China	1:09.73	1:10.77	1:09.73
2nd place, silver medalist(s)	41	Matti Suur-Hamari	Finland	1:09.98	1:10.84	1:09.98
3rd place, bronze medalist(s)	14	Ollie Hill	Great Britain	1:10.45	1:10.51	1:10.45
4	35	Owen Pick	Great Britain	1:10.64	1:11.91	1:10.64
5	38	Evan Strong	United States	1:10.74	1:11.84	1:10.74
6	43	Alex Massie	Canada	1:10.91	1:10.77	1:10.77
7	39	Keith Gabel	United States	1:10.92	1:11.58	1:10.92
8	47	Takahito Ichikawa	Japan	1:11.31	1:12.35	1:11.31
9	40	Ben Tudhope	Australia	1:12.02	1:11.64	1:11.64
10	42	Xu Xiang	China	1:11.73	DNF	1:11.73
11	48	Mathias Menendez-Garcia	France	1:12.19	1:17.25	1:12.19
12	50	Yan Wendi	China	1:12.20	1:12.41	1:12.20
13	37	Keiji Okamoto	Japan	1:13.38	1:14.34	1:13.38
14	57	He Yipeng	China	1:14.24	1:13.50	1:13.50
15	36	Zach Miller	Great Britain	1:14.17	1:14.11	1:14.11
16	49	Lee Jehyuk	South Korea	1:15.83	1:14.39	1:14.39
17	51	Liu Gengliang	China	1:14.49	1:16.79	1:14.49
18	34	Shinji Tabuchi	Japan	1:14.82	1:14.57	1:14.57
19	52	Wojciech Taraba	Poland	1:17.09	1:15.18	1:15.18
20	46	Andy MacLeod	Great Britain	1:18.52	1:16.55	1:16.55
21	51	Matthias Keller	Germany	1:20.16	1:19.07	1:19.07
22	55	Manuel Ness	Germany	1:19.73	1:19.15	1:19.15
23	53	Laurent Vaglica	France	DNF	1:23.84	1:23.84
24	56	Bernhard Hammerl	Austria	1:38.00	1:25.15	1:25.15
25	58	Hossein Solghani	Iran	1:30.41	1:29.31	1:29.31

== Banked slalom SB-UL ==
Rank	Bib	Name	Country	Run 1	Run 2	Best
1st place, gold medalist(s)	6	Maxime Montaggioni	France	1:09.87	1:09.41	1:09.41
2nd place, silver medalist(s)	13	Ji Lijia	China	1:09.86	1:10.16	1:09.86
3rd place, bronze medalist(s)	14	Zhu Yonggang	China	1:34.54	1:10.14	1:10.14
4	9	Wang Pengyao	China	1:10.24	1:10.18	1:10.18
5	5	Jacopo Luchini	Italy	1:11.60	1:10.28	1:10.28
6	7	Jiang Zihao	China	1:11.49	1:11.16	1:11.16
7	17	Yang Jian	China	1:11.84	1:11.71	1:11.71
8	2	Mike Minor	United States	1:12.16	1:12.15	1:12.15
9	1	James Barnes-Miller	Great Britain	1:12.39	1:13.12	1:12.39
10	3	Riccardo Cardani	Italy	1:12.89	1:13.25	1:12.89
11	8	Mirko Moro	Italy	1:13.17	1:12.95	1:12.95
12	11	Lee Chungmin	South Korea	1:14.01	1:13.65	1:13.65
13	4	Masataka Oiwane	Japan	1:14.39	1:14.45	1:14.39
14	16	Park Suhyeok	South Korea	1:16.90	1:17.39	1:16.90
15	12	Michael Spivey	United States	1:17.94	1:17.75	1:17.75
16	10	Konstantinos Petrakis	Greece	1:21.27	1:20.79	1:20.79
17	15	Matti Sairanen	Finland	1:23.98	1:23.31	1:23.31

== See also ==
- Snowboarding at the 2022 Winter Olympics
