= 2022 Winter Paralympics medal table =

List of medals won by Paralympic delegations

2022 Winter Paralympics medals
- Location: Beijing, China

Highlights
- Most gold medals: China (18)
- Most total medals: China (61)
- Medalling NPCs: 19

The medal table of the 2022 Winter Paralympics ranks the participating National Paralympic Committees (NPCs) by the number of gold medals that are won by their athletes during the competition.

Following the Russian invasion of Ukraine, athletes from Belarus and Russia were considered to compete under a neutral flag without appearing in the medal standings. However, following threats of boycott by multiple delegations, the IPC issued a blanket ban on Russian and Belarusian athletes, expelling them from the Paralympic Games.

There were 78 medal events across six sports.

Athletes from 19 NPCs won medals, leaving 27 NPCs without a medal. Host China topped the medal table for the first time with 61 medals in total, including 18 gold medals. LW11 alpine skier Jesper Pedersen from Norway won four gold medals at the 2022 Games, while LW12 biathlete and cross-country skier Oksana Masters from the United States won the most individual medals overall, a total of seven medals, comprising three golds and four silvers.

== Medal table ==
By default, the table is ordered by the number of gold medals the athletes from a nation have won, where nation is an entity represented by a National Paralympic Committee (NPC). The number of silver medals is taken into consideration next and then the number of bronze medals. If there is still a tie after that, then the nations shared the tied rank and are listed alphabetically according to their NPC code.

* Host nation (Host nation)

2022 Winter Paralympics medal table
Rank	NPC	Gold	Silver	Bronze	Total
1	China*	18	20	23	61
2	Ukraine	11	10	8	29
3	Canada	8	6	11	25
4	France	7	3	2	12
5	United States	6	11	3	20
6	Austria	5	5	3	13
7	Germany	4	8	7	19
8	Norway	4	2	1	7
9	Japan	4	1	2	7
10	Slovakia	3	0	3	6
11	Italy	2	3	2	7
12	Sweden	2	2	3	7
13	Finland	2	2	0	4
14	Great Britain	1	1	4	6
15	New Zealand	1	1	2	4
16	Netherlands	0	3	1	4
17	Australia	0	0	1	1
17	Kazakhstan	0	0	1	1
17	Switzerland	0	0	1	1
Totals (19 entries)		78	78	78	234

=== Podium sweeps ===
Date	Sport	Event	Team	Gold	Silver	Bronze	Ref
5 March	Biathlon	Men's 6 kilometres vision impaired	Ukraine	Vitaliy Lukyanenko; Guide: Borys Babar	Oleksandr Kazik; Guide: Serhii Kucheriavyi	Dmytro Suiarko; Guide: Oleksandr Nikonovych	
7 March	Snowboarding	Men's snowboard cross UL	China	Ji Lijia	Wang Pengyao	Zhu Yonggang	
8 March	Biathlon	Women's 10 kilometres standing	Ukraine	Iryna Bui	Oleksandra Kononova	Liudmyla Liashenko	
8 March	Biathlon	Men's 10 kilometres vision impaired	Ukraine	Vitaliy Lukyanenko; Guide: Borys Babar	Anatolii Kovalevskyi; Guide: Oleksandr Mukshyn	Dmytro Suiarko; Guide: Oleksandr Nikonovych	

== See also ==
- 2022 Winter Olympics medal table
- List of 2022 Winter Paralympics medal winners
