= Alpine skiing at the 2022 Winter Paralympics – Men's slalom =

Men's slalom at the XIII Paralympic Winter Games
- Paralympic alpine skiing
- Venue: Yanqing National Alpine Skiing Centre
- Dates: 13 March 2022

Men's slalom (visually impaired) at the XIII Paralympic Winter Games
- Competitors: 13 from 10 nations

Medalists
1st place, gold medalist(s)		Giacomo Bertagnolli	Italy
2nd place, silver medalist(s)		Johannes Aigner	Austria
3rd place, bronze medalist(s)		Miroslav Haraus	Slovakia

Men's slalom (standing) at the XIII Paralympic Winter Games
- Competitors: 46 from 24 nations

Medalists
1st place, gold medalist(s)		Arthur Bauchet	France
2nd place, silver medalist(s)		Liang Jingyi	China
3rd place, bronze medalist(s)		Adam Hall	New Zealand

Men's slalom (sitting) at the XIII Paralympic Winter Games
- Competitors: 39 from 22 nations

Medalists
1st place, gold medalist(s)		Jesper Pedersen	Norway
2nd place, silver medalist(s)		Niels de Langen	Netherlands
3rd place, bronze medalist(s)		René De Silvestro	Italy

The men's slalom competition of the 2022 Winter Paralympics was held at the Yanqing National Alpine Skiing Centre in Beijing on 13 March 2022.

== Medal table ==
Rank	Nation	Gold	Silver	Bronze	Total
1	Italy (ITA)	1	0	1	2
2	France (FRA)	1	0	0	1
2	Norway (NOR)	1	0	0	1
4	Austria (AUT)	0	1	0	1
4	China (CHN)*	0	1	0	1
4	Netherlands (NED)	0	1	0	1
7	New Zealand (NZL)	0	0	1	1
7	Slovakia (SVK)	0	0	1	1
Totals (8 entries)		3	3	3	9

== Visually impaired ==
In the slalom visually impaired, the athlete with a visual impairment has a sighted guide. The two skiers are considered a team, and dual medals are awarded.

Rank	Bib	Name	Country	Run 1	Rank	Run 2	Rank	Total	Difference
1st place, gold medalist(s)	3	Giacomo Bertagnolli; Guide: Andrea Ravelli	Italy	39.62	1	47.20	2	1:26.82	–
2nd place, silver medalist(s)	1	Johannes Aigner; Guide: Matteo Fleischmann	Austria	40.22	2	46.88	1	1:27.10	+0.28
3rd place, bronze medalist(s)	7	Miroslav Haraus; Guide: Maroš Hudík	Slovakia	44.63	3	51.59	4	1:36.22	+9.40
4	5	Hyacinthe Deleplace; Guide: Maxime Jourdan	France	45.07	4	52.08	5	1:37.15	+10.33
5	9	Logan Leach; Guide: Julien Petit	Canada	48.82	6	55.06	6	1:43.88	+17.06
6	13	Marek Kubačka; Guide: Maria Zatovicova	Slovakia	50.13	7	56.27	7	1:46.40	+19.58
7	10	Damir Mizdrak; Guide: Marija Koch	Croatia	50.88	8	57.09	8	1:47.97	+21.15
8	8	Patrick Jensen; Guide: Amelia Hodgson	Australia	53.22	9	58.66	9	1:51.88	+25.06
9	6	Neil Simpson; Guide: Andrew Simpson	Great Britain	1:01.75	11	51.40	3	1:53.15	+26.33
10	12	Patrik Hetmer; Guide: Miroslav Macala	Czech Republic	53.70	10	1:00.52	10	1:54.22	+27.40
	2	Jakub Krako; Guide: Branislav Brozman	Slovakia	45.23	5	DNF	—N/a		
	11	Hwang Min-gyu; Guide: Han Se-hyeon	South Korea	DNF	—N/a				
	4	Michael Scharnagl; Guide: Florian Erharter	Austria	DNS	—N/a				

== Standing ==
Rank	Bib	Name	Country	Run 1	Rank	Run 2	Rank	Total	Difference
1st place, gold medalist(s)	25	Arthur Bauchet	France	40.38	1	49.23	2	1:29.61	–
2nd place, silver medalist(s)	45	Liang Jingyi	China	43.26	3	49.01	1	1:32.27	+2.66
3rd place, bronze medalist(s)	24	Adam Hall	New Zealand	42.70	2	50.51	3	1:33.21	+3.60
4	15	Thomas Pfyl	Switzerland	44.61	6	52.08	5	1:36.69	+7.08
5	22	Hilmar Snær Örvarsson	Iceland	45.17	9	51.75	4	1:36.92	+7.31
6	26	Thomas Walsh	United States	45.04	7	53.66	6	1:38.70	+9.09
7	33	Jordan Broisin	France	46.24	10	54.46	9	1:40.70	+11.09
8	31	James Whitley	Great Britain	48.32	18	54.27	7	1:42.59	+12.98
9	30	Jesse Keefe	United States	47.81	14	56.61	15	1:44.42	+14.81
10	49	Sun Yanlong	China	48.88	20	55.67	11	1:44.55	+14.94
11	35	Martin France	Slovakia	48.73	19	56.05	13	1:44.78	+15.17
12	17	Kohei Takahashi	Japan	48.01	15	56.80	16	1:44.81	+15.20
13	50	Yan Gong	China	49.78	22	55.40	10	1:45.18	+15.57
14	23	Spencer Wood	United States	49.75	21	55.93	12	1:45.68	+16.07
15	46	Arvid Skoglund	Sweden	49.96	23	56.11	14	1:46.07	+16.46
16	27	Oscar Burnham	France	51.92	31	54.38	8	1:46.30	+16.69
17	39	Jules Segers	France	48.22	17	58.36	17	1:46.58	+16.97
18	51	Gakuta Koike	Japan	51.06	26	59.09	18	1:50.15	+20.54
19	52	Marcus Nilsson Grasto	Norway	51.17	27	59.32	19	1:50.49	+20.88
20	41	Manoel Bourdenx	France	50.11	24	1:00.80	22	1:50.91	+21.30
21	48	Manuel Rachbauer	Austria	51.42	29	1:00.19	20	1:51.61	+22.00
22	44	Jeffrey Stuut	Netherlands	51.32	28	1:00.72	21	1:52.04	+22.43
23	57	Rémi Mazi	Belgium	56.13	32	1:01.75	25	1:57.88	+28.27
24	37	Patrick Halgren	United States	51.83	30	1:11.19	26	2:03.02	+33.41
25	34	Masahiko Tokai	Japan	1:06.52	36	1:01.20	23	2:07.72	+38.11
26	47	Yamato Aoki	Japan	1:13.18	37	1:01.61	24	2:14.79	+45.18
	19	Thomas Grochar	Austria	43.88	5	DNF	—N/a		
	20	Andrew Haraghey	United States	47.60	13	DNF	—N/a		
	21	Mitchell Gourley	Australia	46.32	11	DNF	—N/a		
	28	Santeri Kiiveri	Finland	43.66	4	DNF	—N/a		
	29	Robin Cuche	Switzerland	45.14	8	DNF	—N/a		
	36	Aaron Lindström	Sweden	46.49	12	DNF	—N/a		
	40	Andrzej Szczesny	Poland	50.58	25	DNF	—N/a		
	42	Roger Puig	Andorra	48.12	16	DNF	—N/a		
	43	Leander Kress	Germany	56.78	34	DNF	—N/a		
	54	Samuel Fernandez	Chile	1:05.26	35	DNF	—N/a		
	56	Tomas Vaverka	Czech Republic	56.63	33	DNF	—N/a		
	16	Hiraku Misawa	Japan	DNF	—N/a				
	18	Federico Pelizarri	Italy	DNF	—N/a				
	32	Davide Bendotti	Italy	DNF	—N/a				
	53	Chen Xinjun	China	DNF	—N/a				
	55	Byambadorjiin Tserenpuntsag	Mongolia	DNF	—N/a				
	58	Zhen Qixing	China	DNF	—N/a				
	59	Jovica Goreta	Bosnia and Herzegovina	DNF	—N/a				
	38	Christoph Gloetzner	Germany	DSQ	—N/a				
	14	Nico Pajantschitsch	Austria	DNS	—N/a				

== Sitting ==
Rank	Bib	Name	Country	Run 1	Rank	Run 2	Rank	Total	Difference
1st place, gold medalist(s)	63	Jesper Pedersen	Norway	41.19	1	49.91	1	1:31.10	–
2nd place, silver medalist(s)	64	Niels de Langen	Netherlands	44.89	5	52.59	2	1:37.18	+6.08
3rd place, bronze medalist(s)	61	René De Silvestro	Italy	42.22	3	56.22	7	1:38.44	+7.34
4	80	Li Xiang	China	46.63	8	55.17	5	1:41.80	+10.70
5	71	Taiki Morii	Japan	46.48	7	56.07	6	1:42.55	+11.45
6	87	Josh Hanlon	Australia	49.80	11	53.88	3	1:43.68	+12.58
7	77	Lou Braz-Dagand	France	47.14	10	58.53	10	1:45.67	+14.57
8	60	Jasmin Bambur	United States	51.74	14	55.16	4	1:46.90	+15.80
9	79	Aaron Ewen	New Zealand	52.87	16	57.29	8	1:50.16	+19.06
10	65	Ravi Drugan	United States	50.63	12	1:00.36	11	1:50.99	+19.89
11	83	Enrique Plantey	Argentina	56.65	23	57.61	9	1:54.26	+23.16
12	89	Matthew Ryan Brewer	United States	54.96	19	1:00.52	12	1:55.48	+24.38
13	68	Chen Liang	China	45.89	6	1:10.38	14	1:56.27	+25.17
14	90	Pascal Christen	Switzerland	54.83	17	1:01.99	13	1:56.82	+25.72
15	84	Robert Enigl	United States	51.87	15	1:19.82	15	2:11.69	+40.59
16	97	Richard Dumity	Hungary	1:12.11	27	1:21.86	16	2:33.97	+1:02.87
	70	Jernej Slivnik	Slovenia	46.73	9	DNF	—N/a		
	72	Jeroen Kampschreur	Netherlands	41.58	2	DNF	—N/a		
	73	Takeshi Suzuki	Japan	44.82	4	DNF	—N/a		
	75	Pavel Bambousek	Czech Republic	55.34	20	DNF	—N/a		
	82	Wang Hui	China	51.71	13	DNF	—N/a		
	88	Dan Sheen	Great Britain	1:04.90	25	DNF	—N/a		
	92	Tetsu Fujiwara	Japan	55.62	22	DNF	—N/a		
	93	Brian Rowland	Canada	1:06.32	26	DNF	—N/a		
	95	Petr Drahos	Czech Republic	55.45	21	DNF	—N/a		
	91	Alex Slegg	Great Britain	54.88	18	DSQ	—N/a		
	94	Adam Nybo	Denmark	54.88	24	DSQ	—N/a		
	62	Akira Kano	Japan	DNF	—N/a				
	67	Yan Hailing	China	DNF	—N/a				
	69	Nicolás Bisquertt	Chile	DNF	—N/a				
	74	Igor Sikorski	Poland	DNF	—N/a				
	76	Liang Zilu	China	DNF	—N/a				
	78	Floris Meijer	Netherlands	DNF	—N/a				
	81	Kyle Taulman	United States	DNF	—N/a				
	85	Han Sang Min	South Korea	DNF	—N/a				
	86	Murat Pelit	Switzerland	DNF	—N/a				
	96	Miguel Catalan	Chile	DNF	—N/a				
	98	Orlando Pérez	Puerto Rico	DNF	—N/a				
	66	Markus Gfatterhofer	Austria	DNS	—N/a				

== See also ==
- Alpine skiing at the 2022 Winter Olympics
