= Alpine skiing at the 2022 Winter Paralympics =

Alpine skiing at the XIII Paralympic Winter Games
- Venue: National Alpine Ski Center
- Dates: 5–13 March
- Competitors: 170 from 37 nations

Alpine skiing was one of the competitions at the 2022 Winter Paralympics in Beijing, China. In total, 30 medal events were held.

== Events ==
The competition events are:

- Downhill (sitting, standing, visually impaired): women – men
- Super-G (sitting, standing, visually impaired): women – men
- Giant slalom (sitting, standing, visually impaired): women – men
- Slalom (sitting, standing, visually impaired): women – men
- Super combined (sitting, standing, visually impaired): women – men

== Medal summary ==
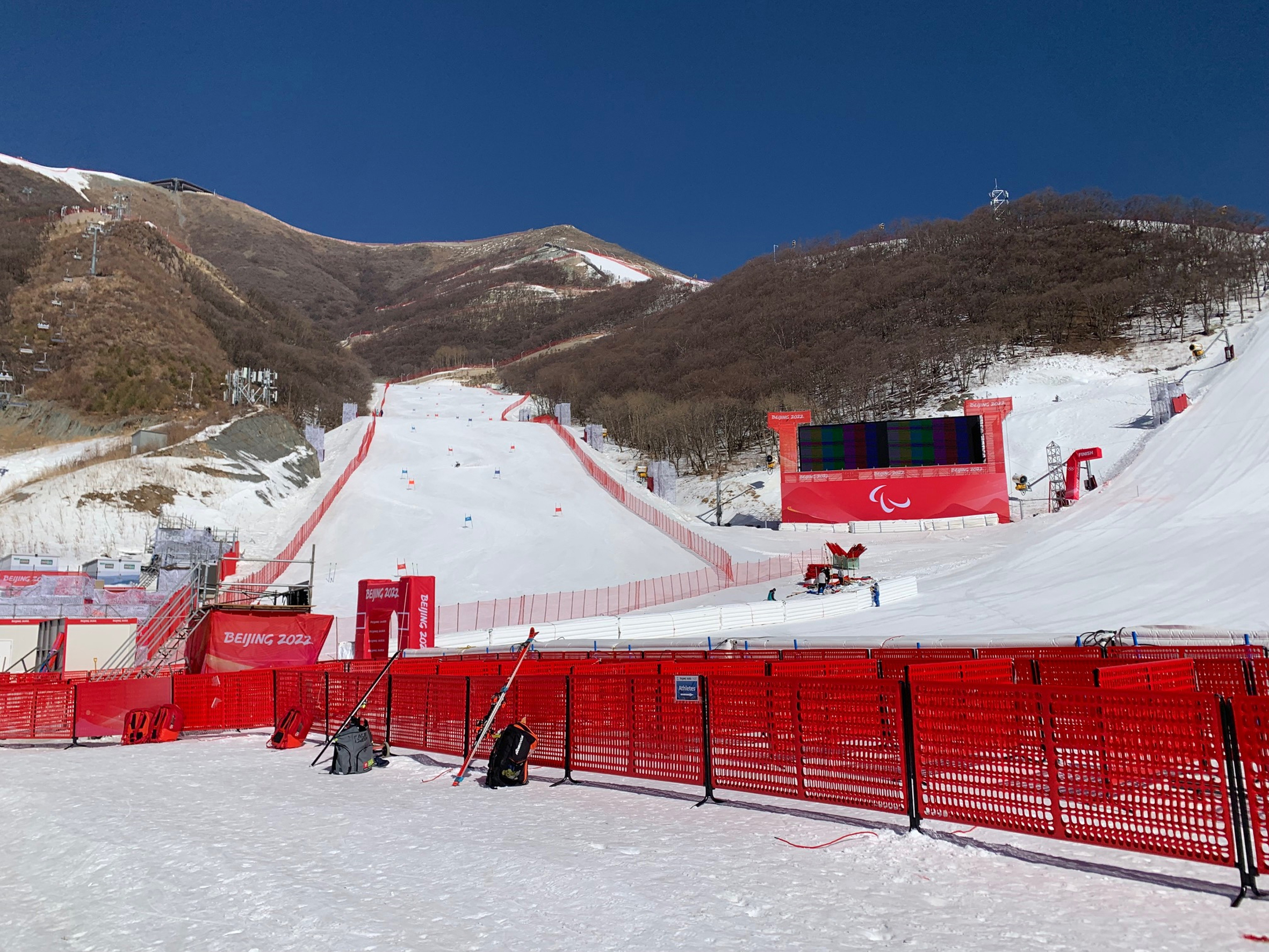
Finishing area for the alpine skiing events.

=== Medal table ===
The ranking in the table is based on information provided by the International Paralympic Committee (IPC) and will be consistent with IPC convention in its published medal tables. By default, the table will be ordered by the number of gold medals the athletes from a nation have won (in this context, a "nation" is an entity represented by a National Paralympic Committee). The number of silver medals is taken into consideration next and then the number of bronze medals. If nations are still tied, equal ranking is given and they are listed alphabetically by IPC country code.

* Host nation (China)

Rank	Nation	Gold	Silver	Bronze	Total
1	Austria (AUT)	5	5	2	12
2	China (CHN)*	3	9	7	19
3	France (FRA)	3	1	2	6
3	Japan (JPN)	3	1	2	6
5	Norway (NOR)	3	1	0	4
6	Slovakia (SVK)	3	0	3	6
7	Italy (ITA)	2	3	1	6
8	Germany (GER)	2	2	2	6
9	Sweden (SWE)	2	0	1	3
10	Canada (CAN)	1	2	3	6
11	Great Britain (GBR)	1	1	3	5
12	New Zealand (NZL)	1	1	2	4
13	Finland (FIN)	1	1	0	2
14	Netherlands (NED)	0	2	1	3
15	United States (USA)	0	1	0	1
16	Switzerland (SUI)	0	0	1	1
Totals (16 entries)		30	30	30	90

=== Women's events ===
Event	Class	Gold		Silver		Bronze	
Downhill	visually impaired	Henrieta Farkašová; Guide: Martin Motyka; Slovakia	1:19.50	Zhu Daqing; Guide: Yan Hanhan; China	1:21.75	Millie Knight; Guide: Brett Wild; Great Britain	1:23.20
Downhill	sitting	Momoka Muraoka; Japan	1:29.77	Anna-Lena Forster; Germany	1:30.59	Liu Sitong; China	1:32.10
Downhill	standing	Mollie Jepsen; Canada	1:21.75	Zhang Mengqiu; China	1:21.85	Ebba Årsjö; Sweden	1:23.20
Super-G	visually impaired	Alexandra Rexová; Guide: Eva Trajčíková; Slovakia	1:17.01	Menna Fitzpatrick; Guide: Gary Smith; Great Britain	1:18.79	Zhu Daqing; Guide: Yan Hanhan; China	1:19.30
Super-G	sitting	Momoka Muraoka; Japan	1:23.73	Anna-Lena Forster; Germany	1:23.84	Zhang Wenjing; China	1:24.31
Super-G	standing	Zhang Mengqiu; China	1:13.54	Marie Bochet; France	1:14.97	Alana Ramsay; Canada	1:16.84
Giant slalom	visually impaired	Veronika Aigner; Guide: Elisabeth Aigner; Austria	1:52.54	Zhu Daqing; Guide: Yan Hanhan; China	1:59.85	Barbara Aigner; Guide: Klara Sykora; Austria	1:59.93
Giant slalom	sitting	Momoka Muraoka; Japan	2:02.27	Liu Sitong; China	2:09.55	Zhang Wenjing; China	2:09.55
Giant slalom	standing	Zhang Mengqiu; China	1:55.12	Mollie Jepsen; Canada	2:00.95	Andrea Rothfuss; Germany	2:01.91
Slalom	visually impaired	Veronika Aigner; Guide: Elisabeth Aigner; Austria	1:31.53	Barbara Aigner; Guide: Klara Sykora; Austria	1:33.24	Alexandra Rexová; Guide: Eva Trajčíková; Slovakia	1:36.31
Slalom	sitting	Anna-Lena Forster; Germany	1:37.86	Zhang Wenjing; China	1:40.18	Liu Sitong; China	1:41.31
Slalom	standing	Ebba Årsjö; Sweden	1:31.76	Zhang Mengqiu; China	1:37.40	Anna-Maria Rieder; Germany	1:40.50
Super combined	visually impaired	Henrieta Farkašová; Guide: Michal Červeň; Slovakia	2:03.39	Zhu Daqing; Guide: Yan Hanhan; China	2:04.25	Menna Fitzpatrick; Guide: Gary Smith; Great Britain	2:05.98
Super combined	sitting	Anna-Lena Forster; Germany	2:11.37	Momoka Muraoka; Japan	2:12.14	Liu Sitong; China	2:15.84
Super combined	standing	Ebba Årsjö; Sweden	1:56.51	Zhang Mengqiu; China	1:58.02	Alana Ramsay; Canada	2:06.33

=== Men's events ===
Event	Class	Gold		Silver		Bronze	
Downhill	visually impaired	Johannes Aigner; Guide: Matteo Fleischmann; Austria	1:13.45	Mac Marcoux; Guide: Jack Leitch; Canada	1:13.81	Hyacinthe Deleplace; Guide: Valentin Giraud Moine; France	1:14.10
Downhill	sitting	Corey Peters; New Zealand	1:16.73	Jesper Pedersen; Norway	1:17.99	Taiki Morii; Japan	1:18.29
Downhill	standing	Arthur Bauchet; France	1:14.92	Markus Salcher; Austria	1:15.25	Théo Gmür; Switzerland	1:16.17
Super-G	visually impaired	Neil Simpson; Guide: Andrew Simpson; Great Britain	1:08.91	Giacomo Bertagnolli; Guide: Andrea Ravelli; Italy	1:09.31	Johannes Aigner; Guide: Matteo Fleischmann; Austria	1:09.74
Super-G	sitting	Jesper Pedersen; Norway	1:09.69	Corey Peters; New Zealand	1:10.16	Taiki Morii; Japan	1:10.61
Super-G	standing	Liang Jingyi; China	1:09.11	Markus Salcher; Austria	1:09.35	Alexis Guimond; Canada	1:10.02
Giant slalom	visually impaired	Johannes Aigner; Guide: Matteo Fleischmann; Austria	1:49.34	Giacomo Bertagnolli; Guide: Andrea Ravelli; Italy	1:51.02	Miroslav Haraus; Guide: Maroš Hudík; Slovakia	1:54.92
Giant slalom	sitting	Jesper Pedersen; Norway	1:54.20	René De Silvestro; Italy	1:57.50	Liang Zilu; China	2:00.92
Giant slalom	standing	Santeri Kiiveri; Finland	1:55.40	Thomas Walsh; United States	1:55.44	Arthur Bauchet; France	1:55.89
Slalom	visually impaired	Giacomo Bertagnolli; Guide: Andrea Ravelli; Italy	1:26.82	Johannes Aigner; Guide: Matteo Fleischmann; Austria	1:27.10	Miroslav Haraus; Guide: Maroš Hudík; Slovakia	1:36.22
Slalom	sitting	Jesper Pedersen; Norway	1:31.10	Niels de Langen; Netherlands	1:37.18	René De Silvestro; Italy	1:38.44
Slalom	standing	Arthur Bauchet; France	1:29.61	Liang Jingyi; China	1:32.27	Adam Hall; New Zealand	1:33.21
Super combined	visually impaired	Giacomo Bertagnolli; Guide: Andrea Ravelli; Italy	1:49.80	Johannes Aigner; Guide: Matteo Fleischmann; Austria	1:51.98	Neil Simpson; Guide: Andrew Simpson; Great Britain	1:52.81
Super combined	sitting	Jesper Pedersen; Norway	1:50.23	Jeroen Kampschreur; Netherlands	1:50.51	Niels de Langen; Netherlands	1:53.40
Super combined	standing	Arthur Bauchet; France	1:50.26	Santeri Kiiveri; Finland	1:54.48	Adam Hall; New Zealand	1:54.77

== Participating nations ==
- Andorra (1)
- Argentina (1)
- Australia (6)
- Austria (13)
- Belgium (2)
- Bosnia and Herzegovina (2)
- Canada (9)
- Chile (4)
- China (22)
- Croatia (2)
- Czech Republic (4)
- Denmark (1)
- Finland (2)
- France (9)
- Germany (6)
- Great Britain (7)
- Greece (1)
- Hungary (1)
- Iceland (1)
- Israel (1)
- Italy (6)
- Japan (14)
- Liechtenstein (1)
- Mexico (1)
- Mongolia (1)
- Netherlands (5)
- New Zealand (3)
- Norway (2)
- Poland (2)
- Puerto Rico (1)
- Romania (1)
- Slovakia (8)
- Slovenia (1)
- South Korea (4)
- Sweden (3)
- Switzerland (5)
- United States (17)

== See also ==
- Alpine skiing at the 2022 Winter Olympics
