= Alpine skiing at the 2022 Winter Paralympics – Men's super combined =

Men's super combined at the XIII Paralympic Winter Games
- Paralympic alpine skiing
- Venue: Yanqing National Alpine Skiing Centre
- Dates: 7 March 2022

Men's super combined (visually impaired) at the XIII Paralympic Winter Games
- Competitors: 11 from 8 nations

Medalists
1st place, gold medalist(s)		Giacomo Bertagnolli	Italy
2nd place, silver medalist(s)		Johannes Aigner	Austria
3rd place, bronze medalist(s)		Neil Simpson	Great Britain

Men's super combined (standing) at the XIII Paralympic Winter Games
- Competitors: 36 from 17 nations

Medalists
1st place, gold medalist(s)		Arthur Bauchet	France
2nd place, silver medalist(s)		Santeri Kiiveri	Finland
3rd place, bronze medalist(s)		Adam Hall	New Zealand

Men's super combined (sitting) at the XIII Paralympic Winter Games
- Competitors: 25 from 15 nations

Medalists
1st place, gold medalist(s)		Jesper Pedersen	Norway
2nd place, silver medalist(s)		Jeroen Kampschreur	Netherlands
3rd place, bronze medalist(s)		Niels de Langen	Netherlands

The Men's super combined competition of the 2022 Winter Paralympics was held at the Yanqing National Alpine Skiing Centre on 7 March 2022.

== Medal table ==
Rank	Nation	Gold	Silver	Bronze	Total
1	France (FRA)	1	0	0	1
1	Italy (ITA)	1	0	0	1
1	Norway (NOR)	1	0	0	1
4	Netherlands (NED)	0	1	1	2
5	Austria (AUT)	0	1	0	1
5	Finland (FIN)	0	1	0	1
7	Great Britain (GBR)	0	0	1	1
7	New Zealand (NZL)	0	0	1	1
Totals (8 entries)		3	3	3	9

== Visually impaired ==
In the super combined visually impaired, the athlete with a visual impairment has a sighted guide. The two skiers are considered a team, and dual medals are awarded.

Rank	Bib	Name	Country	Super-G	Rank	Slalom	Rank	Total	Difference
1st place, gold medalist(s)	6	Giacomo Bertagnolli; Guide: Andrea Ravelli	Italy	1:10.71	3	39;09	1	1:49.80	–
2nd place, silver medalist(s)	1	Johannes Aigner; Guide: Matteo Fleischmann	Austria	1:10.65	2	41.33	2	1:51.98	+2.18
3rd place, bronze medalist(s)	2	Neil Simpson; Guide: Andrew Simpson	Great Britain	1:10.87	5	41.94	3	1:52.81	+3.01
4	7	Jakub Krako; Guide: Branislav Brozman	Slovakia	1:10.79	4	43.52	4	1:54.31	+4.51
5	3	Hyacinthe Deleplace; Guide: Valentin Giraud Moine	France	1:09.12	1	47.62	6	1:56.74	+6.94
6	11	Logan Leach; Guide: Julien Petit	Canada	1:19.30	8	46.97	5	2:06.27	+16.47
7	8	Hwang Min-gyu; Guide: Han Se-hyeon	South Korea	1:21.97	9	49.95	7	2:11.42	+21.62
	4	Miroslav Haraus; Guide: Maroš Hudík	Slovakia	1:11.02	6	DNF	—N/a		
	9	Patrick Jensen; Guide: Amelia Hodgson	Australia	1:17.85	7	DNF	—N/a		
	10	Marek Kubačka; Guide: Maria Zatovicova	Slovakia	DNF	—N/a				
	5	Mac Marcoux; Guide: Tristan Rodgers	Canada	DNS	—N/a				

== Standing ==
Rank	Bib	Name	Country	Super-G	Rank	Slalom	Rank	Total	Difference
1st place, gold medalist(s)	12	Arthur Bauchet	France	1:10.88	1	39.38	1	1:50.26	–
2nd place, silver medalist(s)	22	Santeri Kiiveri	Finland	1:12.95	3	41.53	6	1:54.48	+4.22
3rd place, bronze medalist(s)	26	Adam Hall	New Zealand	1:15.33	15	39.44	2	1:54.77	+4.51
4	19	Thomas Walsh	United States	1:13.94	8	40.94	4	1:54.88	+4.62
5	17	Federico Pelizzari	Italy	1:15.15	13	40.74	3	1:55.89	+5.63
6	24	Thomas Grochar	Austria	1:14.26	11	41.66	7	1:55.92	+5.66
7	36	Aaron Lindström	Sweden	1:14.22	10	41.84	8	1:56.06	+5.80
8	14	Robin Cuche	Switzerland	1:13.14	4	43.53	12	1:56.67	+6.41
9	21	Nico Pajantschitsch	Austria	1:13.84	7	43.23	10	1:57.07	+6.81
10	47	Oscar Burnham	Austria	1:15.76	16	41.34	5	1:57.10	+6.84
11	30	Hiraku Misawa	Japan	1:15.18	14	42.57	9	1:57.75	+7.49
12	15	Manoel Bourdenx	France	1:13.65	5	45.26	16	1:58.91	+8.65
13	20	Mitchell Gourley	Australia	1:16.00	17	43.26	11	1:59.26	+9.00
14	27	Spencer Wood	United States	1:14.88	12	45.22	15	2:00.10	+9.84
15	33	Jesse Keefe	United States	1:16.81	20	44.93	13	2:01.74	+11.48
16	37	Sun Yanlong	China	1:16.87	21	45.02	14	2:01.89	+11.63
17	32	Leander Kress	Germany	1:16.29	18	46.52	19	2:02.81	+12.55
18	29	Martin France	Slovakia	1:16.46	19	46.44	18	2:02.90	+12.64
19	41	Arvid Skoglund	Sweden	1:17.41	23	46.16	17	2:03.57	+13.31
20	38	Masahiko Tokai	Japan	1:21.30	28	47.24	20	2:08.54	+18.28
21	43	Niu Shaojie	China	1:19.71	27	49.23	21	2:08.94	+18.68
22	34	Marcus Nilsson Grasto	Norway	1:19.61	26	49.71	22	2:09.32	+19.06
23	13	Roger Puig	Andorra	1:14.07	9	57.12	23	2:11.19	+20.93
	16	Thomas Pfyl	Switzerland	1:13.70	6	DNF	—N/a		
	18	Davide Bendotti	Italy	1:17.37	22	DNF	—N/a		
	40	Jules Segers	France	1:17.59	24	DNF	—N/a		
	42	Chen Xinjun	China	1:23.75	30	DNF	—N/a		
	44	Tyler Carter	United States	1:22.71	29	DNF	—N/a		
	39	Théo Gmür	Switzerland	1:12.05	2	DSQ	—N/a		
	23	Jordan Broisin	France	1:19.20	25	DNS	—N/a		
	28	Gakuta Koike	Japan	DNF	—N/a				
	31	Jeffrey Stuut	Netherlands	DNF	—N/a				
	35	Andrew Haraghey	United States	DNF	—N/a				
	45	Yan Gong	China	DNF	—N/a				
	25	James Whitley	Great Britain	DSQ	—N/a				
	46	Liang Jingyi	China	DSQ	—N/a				

== Sitting ==
Rank	Bib	Name	Country	Super-G	Rank	Slalom	Rank	Total	Difference
1st place, gold medalist(s)	48	Jesper Pedersen	Norway	1:10.29	1	39.34	1	1:50.23	–
2nd place, silver medalist(s)	51	Jeroen Kampschreur	Netherlands	1:11.99	3	38.52	1	1:50.51	+0.28
3rd place, bronze medalist(s)	49	Niels de Langen	Netherlands	1:13.04	4	40.36	4	1:53.40	+3.17
4	61	Liang Zilu	China	1:15.86	9	39.46	2	1:55.32	+5.09
5	53	Takeshi Suzuki	Japan	1:16.40	11	40.77	5	1:57.17	+6.94
6	63	Li Xiang	China	1:17.75	13	47.75	6	2:05.50	+15.27
7	58	Han Sang-min	South Korea	1:19.11	16	47.97	7	2:07.08	+16.85
8	55	Lou Braz-Dagand	France	1:18.30	15	50.16	8	2:08.46	+18.23
9	68	Nicolás Bisquertt	Chile	1:16.51	12	52.07	9	2:08.58	+18.35
	52	Floris Meijer	Netherlands	1:14.25	5	DNF	—N/a		
	56	Pascal Christen	Switzerland	1:15.05	7	DNF	—N/a		
	59	Aaron Ewen	New Zealand	1:16.27	10	DNF	—N/a		
	60	Murat Pelit	Switzerland	1:19.30	17	DNF	—N/a		
	67	Ravi Drugan	United States	1:19.91	18	DNF	—N/a		
	69	Taiki Morii	Japan	1:10.79	2	DNF	—N/a		
	71	Akira Kano	Japan	1:14.70	6	DNF	—N/a		
	72	Gong Zhaolin	China	1:17.96	14	DNF	—N/a		
	70	Chen Liang	China	1:15.54	8	DSQ	—N/a		
	50	René De Silvestro	Italy	DNF	—N/a				
	54	Igor Sikorski	Poland	DNF	—N/a				
	57	Enrique Plantey	Argentina	DNF	—N/a				
	62	Pavel Bambousek	Czech Republic	DNF	—N/a				
	64	Tetsu Fujiwara	Japan	DNF	—N/a				
	65	Yan Hailing	China	DNF	—N/a				
	66	Brian Rowland	Canada	DNS	—N/a				

== See also ==
- Alpine skiing at the 2022 Winter Olympics
