= Japan at the 2022 Winter Paralympics =

- Flag of Japan
- IPC code: JPN
- NPC: Japan Paralympic Committee
- Website: www.parasports.or.jp (in Japanese)

in Beijing, China 4 March 2022 – 13 March 2022
- Competitors: 29 (21 men and 8 women) in 4 sports
- Flag bearer (opening): Taiki Kawayoke
- Flag bearer (closing): Taiki Kawayoke
- Medals Ranked 9th: Gold 4 Silver 1 Bronze 2 Total 7

Winter Paralympics appearances (overview)
- 1976; 1980; 1984; 1988; 1992; 1994; 1998; 2002; 2006; 2010; 2014; 2018; 2022; 2026

Japan competed at the 2022 Winter Paralympics in Beijing, China which took place between 4–13 March 2022. In total, 29 athletes were scheduled to compete.

Team captain and para-alpine skier, Momoka Muraoka, became the most successful athlete after winning four medals at once. She won the downhill, Super-G, and giant slalom events. She also won silver in the super combined event.

== Administration ==
President of the Japanese Paralympic Committee Junichi Kawai served as Chef de Mission.

== Competitors ==
The following is the list of number of competitors participating at the Games per sport/discipline.

Sport	Men	Women	Total
Alpine skiing	9	6	15
Biathlon	1*	2*	3*
Cross-country skiing	6*	3*	9*
Snowboarding	6	0	6
Total	21	8	29

== Medalists ==
The following Japanese competitors won medals at the games. In the discipline sections below, the medalists' names are bolded.

Medal	Name	Sport	Event	Date
Gold	Momoka Muraoka	Alpine skiing	Women's downhill, sitting	5 March
Gold	Momoka Muraoka	Alpine skiing	Women's super-G, sitting	6 March
Gold	Taiki Kawayoke	Cross-country skiing	Men's 20 kilometre classical free, standing	7 March
Gold	Momoka Muraoka	Alpine skiing	Women's giant slalom, sitting	11 March
Silver	Momoka Muraoka	Alpine skiing	Women's super combined, sitting	7 March
Bronze	Taiki Morii	Alpine skiing	Men's downhill, sitting	5 March
Bronze	Taiki Morii	Alpine skiing	Men's super-G, sitting	6 March

**Medals by sport**
**Sport**	1st place, gold medalist(s)	2nd place, silver medalist(s)	3rd place, bronze medalist(s)	**Total**
Alpine skiing	3	1	2	**6**
Cross-country skiing	1	0	0	**1**
**Total**	**4**	**1**	**2**	**7**

**Medals by gender**
**Gender**	1st place, gold medalist(s)	2nd place, silver medalist(s)	3rd place, bronze medalist(s)	**Total**
Male	1	0	2	**3**
Female	3	1	0	**4**
**Total**	**4**	**1**	**2**	**7**

== Alpine skiing ==
Japan competed in alpine skiing.

Men

Athlete	Event	Run 1		Run 2		Total	
Athlete	Event	Time	Rank	Time	Rank	Time	Rank
Yamato Aoki	Giant slalom, standing	1:10.99	31	1:07.44	31	2:18.43	30
Yamato Aoki	Slalom, standing	1:13.18	37	1:01.61	24	2:14.79	26
Tetsu Fujiwara	Giant slalom, sitting	1:10.28	24	1:08.62	25	2:18.90	23
Tetsu Fujiwara	Slalom, sitting	55.62	22	DNF			
Tetsu Fujiwara	Super combined, sitting	DNF					
Tetsu Fujiwara	Super-G, sitting	—N/a				DNF	
Akira Kano	Downhill, sitting	—N/a				1:20.58	7
Akira Kano	Giant slalom, sitting	1:07.36	19	DNF			
Akira Kano	Slalom, sitting	DNF					
Akira Kano	Super combined, sitting	1:14.70	6	DNF			
Akira Kano	Super-G, sitting	—N/a				DNF	
Gakuta Koike	Downhill, standing	—N/a				1:22.46	21
Gakuta Koike	Giant slalom, standing	1:03.05	14	1:01.00	14	2:04.05	14
Gakuta Koike	Slalom, standing	51.06	26	59.09	18	1:50.15	18
Gakuta Koike	Super combined, standing	DNF					
Gakuta Koike	Super-G, standing	—N/a				1:16.43	24
Hiraku Misawa	Downhill, standing	—N/a				1:20.20	14
Hiraku Misawa	Slalom, standing	DNF					
Hiraku Misawa	Super combined, standing	1:15.18	14	42.57	9	1:57.75	11
Hiraku Misawa	Super-G, standing	—N/a				DNF	
Taiki Morii	Downhill, sitting	—N/a				1:18.29	3rd place, bronze medalist(s)
Taiki Morii	Giant slalom, sitting	1:05.38	10	1:01.74	7	2:07.12	8
Taiki Morii	Slalom, sitting	46.48	7	56.07	6	1:42.55	5
Taiki Morii	Super combined, sitting	1:10.79	2	DNF			
Taiki Morii	Super-G, sitting	—N/a				1:10.61	3rd place, bronze medalist(s)
Takeshi Suzuki	Downhill, sitting	—N/a				1:22.84	8
Takeshi Suzuki	Giant slalom, sitting	1:04.93	9	59.83	5	2:04.76	5
Takeshi Suzuki	Slalom, sitting	44.82	4	DNF			
Takeshi Suzuki	Super combined, sitting	1:16.40	11	40.77	5	1:57.17	5
Takeshi Suzuki	Super-G, sitting	—N/a				1:16.73	11
Kohei Takahashi	Slalom, standing	48.01	15	56.80	16	1:44.81	12
Masahiko Tokai	Giant slalom, standing	1:11.40	33	1:07.30	30	2:18.70	31
Masahiko Tokai	Slalom, standing	1:06.52	36	1:01.20	23	2:07.72	25
Masahiko Tokai	Super combined, standing	1:21.30	28	47.24	20	2:08.54	20
Masahiko Tokai	Super-G, standing	—N/a				DQ	

Women

Athlete	Event	Run 1		Run 2		Total	
Athlete	Event	Time	Rank	Time	Rank	Time	Rank
Norika Harada	Giant slalom, sitting	DNF					
Norika Harada	Slalom, sitting	1:10.31	7	1:07.77	8	2:28.08	8
Ammi Hondo	Downhill, standing	—N/a				1:25.90	6
Ammi Hondo	Giant slalom, standing	1:03.58	10	1:07.49	7	2:11.07	7
Ammi Hondo	Slalom, standing	57.97	7	59.49	7	1:57.46	6
Ammi Hondo	Super combined, standing	1:21.98	7	51.42	6	2:13.40	6
Ammi Hondo	Super-G, standing	—N/a				1:19.92	8
Noriko Kamiyama	Downhill, standing	—N/a				1:38.49	8
Noriko Kamiyama	Giant slalom, standing	1:10.48	16	1:15.74	14	2:26.22	13
Noriko Kamiyama	Slalom, standing	1:01.24	8	1:01.71	8	2:02.95	8
Noriko Kamiyama	Super combined, standing	DQ					
Noriko Kamiyama	Super-G, standing	—N/a				1:27.73	10
Momoka Muraoka	Downhill, sitting	—N/a				1:29.77	1st place, gold medalist(s)
Momoka Muraoka	Giant slalom, sitting	1:01.76	2	1:00.51	1	2:02.27	1st place, gold medalist(s)
Momoka Muraoka	Slalom, sitting	53.44	5	52.10	4	1:45.54	5
Momoka Muraoka	Super combined, sitting	1:20.37	1	51.77	2	2:12.14	2nd place, silver medalist(s)
Momoka Muraoka	Super-G, sitting	—N/a				1:23.73	1st place, gold medalist(s)
Yoshiko Tanaka	Giant slalom, sitting	DNF					
Yoshiko Tanaka	Slalom, sitting	1:10.78	8	1:05.15	6	2:15.93	6
Yoshiko Tanaka	Super combined, sitting	1:36.33	5	1:08.81	4	2:45.14	4
Yoshiko Tanaka	Super-G, sitting	—N/a				1:35.69	5

== Biathlon ==
Japan competed in biathlon.

Men

Athlete	Events	Final		
Athlete	Events	Missed Shots	Result	Rank
Keiichi Sato	6 km, standing	2	19:15.3	11
Keiichi Sato	10 km, standing	1	34:49.2	9
Keiichi Sato	12.5 km, standing	1	45:15.7	7

Women

Athlete	Events	Final		
Athlete	Events	Missed Shots	Result	Rank
Momoko Dekijima	6 km, standing	2	22:35.5	14
Momoko Dekijima	10 km, standing	3	41:59.1	10
Momoko Dekijima	12.5 km, standing	4	56:29.2	12
Yurika Abe	6 km, standing	7	26:13.1	16
Yurika Abe	12.5 km, standing	8	1:03:34.3	13

== Cross-country skiing ==
Japan competed in cross-country skiing.

Men

Athlete	Event	Qualification		Semifinal		Final	
Athlete	Event	Result	Rank	Result	Rank	Result	Rank
Ryohei Ariyasu; Guide: Yuhei Fujita	Sprint, visually impaired	3:34.72	16	Did not advance			
Ryohei Ariyasu; Guide: Yuhei Fujita	Middle distance, visually impaired	—N/a				45:01.8	16
Ryohei Ariyasu; Guide: Yuhei Fujita	Long distance, visually impaired	—N/a				1:15:04.8	7
Keigo Iwamoto	Sprint, standing	3:14.45	22	Did not advance			
Keigo Iwamoto	Middle distance, standing	—N/a				41:18.7	15
Keigo Iwamoto	Long distance, standing	—N/a				1:04:58.7	13
Taiki Kawayoke	Sprint, standing	2:49.95	6 Q	3:30.1	4	Did not advance	
Taiki Kawayoke	Middle distance, standing	—N/a				37:23.9	8
Taiki Kawayoke	Long distance, standing	—N/a				52:52.8	1st place, gold medalist(s)
Hiroaki Mori	Sprint, sitting	2:49.22	31	Did not advance			
Hiroaki Mori	Middle distance, sitting	—N/a				43:07.9	30
Yoshihiro Nitta	Sprint, standing	2:56.69	12 Q	3:32.7	4	Did not advance	
Yoshihiro Nitta	Long distance, standing	—N/a				57:46.7	7
Keiichi Sato	Middle distance, standing	—N/a				39:58.8	12

Women

Athlete	Event	Qualification		Semifinal		Final	
Athlete	Event	Result	Rank	Result	Rank	Result	Rank
Yurika Abe	Sprint, standing	3:46.04	12 Q	4:57.1	6	Did not qualify	
Yurika Abe	Long distance, standing	—N/a				56:45.7	8
Momoko Dekijima	Middle distance, standing	—N/a				46:55.3	14
Mika Iwamoto	Sprint, standing	4:11.96	15	Did not qualify			
Mika Iwamoto	Middle distancee, standing	—N/a				55:17.0	15

Relay

Athletes	Event	Final	
Athletes	Event	Time	Rank
Keigo Iwamoto; Momoko Dekijima; Hiroaki Mori; Yurika Abe	4 x 2.5 km mixed relay	31:17.7	7
Yoshihiro Nitta; Taiki Kawayoke	4 x 2.5 km open relay	31:38.1	7

== Snowboarding ==
Japan competed in snowboarding.

Banked slalom

Athlete	Event	Run 1	Run 2	Best	Rank
Daichi Oguri	Men's SB-LL1	1:15.55	1:14.42	1:14.42	7
Junta Kosuda	Men's SB-LL1	1:16.32	DNF	1:16.32	10
Takahito Ichikawa	Men's SB-LL2	1:11.31	1:12.35	1:11.31	8
Keiji Okamoto	Men's SB-LL2	1:13.38	1:14.34	1:13.38	13
Shinji Tabuchi	Men's SB-LL2	1:14.82	1:14.57	1:14.57	18
Masataka Oiwane	Men's SB-UL	1:14.39	1:14.45	1:14.39	13

Snowboard cross

Athlete	Event	Qualification			Quarterfinal	Semifinal	Final
Athlete	Event	Run 1	Run 2	Rank	Position	Position	Position
Daichi Oguri	Men's SB-LL1	1:08.34	1:07.69	6 Q	2 Q	4 FB	5
Junta Kosuda	Men's SB-LL1	1:08.89	DNF	7 Q	2 Q	3 FB	7
Takahito Ichikawa	Men's SB-LL2	1:04.33	1:03.63	6 Q	2 Q	4 FB	5
Keiji Okamoto	Men's SB-LL2	1:04.77	1:03.95	8 Q	2 Q	4 FB	8
Shinji Tabuchi	Men's SB-LL2	1:07.36	1:07.72	16 Q	3	Did not advance	
Masataka Oiwane	Men's SB-UL	1:04.18	1:12.10	11 Q	2 Q	4 FB	8

Qualification legend: Q - Qualify to next round; FA - Qualify to medal final; FB - Qualify to consolation final

== See also ==
- Japan at the Paralympics
- Japan at the 2022 Winter Olympics
