= Alpine skiing at the 2022 Winter Paralympics – Men's giant slalom =

Men's giant slalom at the XIII Paralympic Winter Games
- Paralympic alpine skiing
- Venue: Yanqing National Alpine Skiing Centre
- Dates: 10 March 2022

Men's giant slalom (visually impaired) at the XIII Paralympic Winter Games
- Competitors: 12 from 10 nations

Medalists
1st place, gold medalist(s)		Johannes Aigner	Austria
2nd place, silver medalist(s)		Giacomo Bertagnolli	Italy
3rd place, bronze medalist(s)		Miroslav Haraus	Slovakia

Men's giant slalom (standing) at the XIII Paralympic Winter Games
- Competitors: 44 from 22 nations

Medalists
1st place, gold medalist(s)		Santeri Kiiveri	Finland
2nd place, silver medalist(s)		Thomas Walsh	United States
3rd place, bronze medalist(s)		Arthur Bauchet	France

Men's giant slalom (sitting) at the XIII Paralympic Winter Games
- Competitors: 40 from 21 nations

Medalists
1st place, gold medalist(s)		Jesper Pedersen	Norway
2nd place, silver medalist(s)		René De Silvestro	Italy
3rd place, bronze medalist(s)		Liang Zilu	China

The Men's giant slalom competition of the 2022 Winter Paralympics was held at the Yanqing National Alpine Skiing Centre on 10 March 2022.

== Medal table ==
Rank	Nation	Gold	Silver	Bronze	Total
1	Austria (AUT)	1	0	0	1
1	Finland (FIN)	1	0	0	1
1	Norway (NOR)	1	0	0	1
4	Italy (ITA)	0	2	0	2
5	United States (USA)	0	1	0	1
6	China (CHN)*	0	0	1	1
6	France (FRA)	0	0	1	1
6	Slovakia (SVK)	0	0	1	1
Totals (8 entries)		3	3	3	9

== Visually impaired ==
In the giant slalom visually impaired, the athlete with a visual impairment has a sighted guide. The two skiers are considered a team, and dual medals are awarded.

Rank	Bib	Name	Country	Run 1	Rank	Run 2	Rank	Total	Difference
1st place, gold medalist(s)	6	Johannes Aigner; Guide: Matteo Fleischmann	Austria	55.91	2	53.43	1	1:49.34	–
2nd place, silver medalist(s)	2	Giacomo Bertagnolli; Guide: Andrea Ravelli	Italy	54.88	1	56.14	2	1:51.02	+1.68
3rd place, bronze medalist(s)	1	Miroslav Haraus; Guide: Maroš Hudík	Slovakia	57.24	3	57.68	4	1:54.92	+5.58
4	3	Marek Kubačka; Guide: Maria Zatovicova	Slovakia	58.95	5	57.52	3	1:56.47	+7.13
5	4	Neil Simpson; Guide: Andrew Simpson	Great Britain	1:00.81	6	58.64	5	1:59.45	+10.11
6	8	Patrik Hetmer; Guide: Miroslav Macala	Czech Republic	1:11.77	10	1:05.99	6	2:17.76	+28.42
	12	Damir Mizdrak; Guide: Marija Koch	Croatia	1:15.60	11	1:12.45	7	2:28.05	+38.71
	7	Hyacinthe Deleplace; Guide: Maxime Jourdan	France	58.47	4	DNF	—N/a		
	9	Logan Leach; Guide: Julien Petit	Canada	1:05.85	8	DNF	—N/a		
	10	Hwang Min-gyu; Guide: Han Se-Hyeon	South Korea	1:05.23	7	DNF	—N/a		
	11	Patrick Jensen; Guide: Amelia Hodgson	Australia	1:09.98	9	DNF	—N/a		
	5	Jakub Krako; Guide: Branislav Brozman	Slovakia	DNF	—N/a				

== Standing ==
Rank	Bib	Name	Country	Run 1	Rank	Run 2	Rank	Total	Difference
1st place, gold medalist(s)	22	Santeri Kiiveri	Finland	57.98	2	57.42	3	1:55.40	–
2nd place, silver medalist(s)	13	Thomas Walsh	United States	57.60	1	57.84	5	1:55.44	+0.04
3rd place, bronze medalist(s)	19	Arthur Bauchet	France	59.19	6	56.70	1	1:55.89	+0.49
4	14	Federico Pelizzari	Italy	58.77	4	57.59	4	1:56.36	+0.96
5	15	Théo Gmür	Switzerland	58.36	3	58.56	7	1:56.92	+1.52
6	42	James Whitley	Great Britain	1:01.08	12	57.30	2	1:58.38	+2.98
7	28	Oscar Burnham	France	1:00.11	10	58.34	6	1:58.45	+3.05
8	27	Liang Jingyi	China	58.87	5	59.60	12	1:58.47	+3.07
9	26	Nico Pajantschitsch	Austria	1:00.05	9	58.57	8	1:58.62	+3.22
10	21	Mitchell Gourley	Australia	59.73	7	59.54	11	1:59.27	+3.87
11	18	Markus Salcher	Austria	1:00.27	11	59.44	10	1:59.71	+4.31
12	17	Jordan Broisin	France	1:00.00	8	59.95	13	1:59.95	+4.55
13	30	Manoel Bourdenx	France	1:01.64	13	59.12	9	2:00.76	+5.36
14	44	Gakuta Koike	Japan	1:03.05	14	1:01.00	14	2:04.05	+8.65
15	43	Jesse Keefe	United States	1:03.06	15	1:01.48	15	2:04.54	+9.14
16	40	Jules Segers	France	1:03.91	19	1:01.55	16	2:05.46	+10.06
17	37	Roger Puig Davi	Andorra	1:03.88	18	1:01.73	17	2:05.61	+10.21
18	33	Martin France	Slovakia	1:03.72	17	1:02.14	18	2:05.86	+10.46
19	49	Sun Yanlong	China	1:03.69	16	1:02.91	21	2:06.60	+11.20
20	31	Jeffrey Stuut	Netherlands	1:04.85	20	1:02.25	19	2:07.10	+11.70
21	39	Davide Bendotti	Italy	1:05.20	21	1:02.30	20	2:07.50	+12.10
22	47	Leander Kress	Germany	1:06.22	24	1:03.21	22	2:09.43	+14.03
23	51	Andrzej Szczęsny	Poland	1:06.14	23	1:03.72	24	2:09.86	+14.46
24	54	Marcus Nilsson Grasto	Norway	1:06.99	25	1:03.53	23	2:10.52	+15.12
25	34	Chen Xinjun	China	1:07.17	27	1:04.70	25	2:11.87	+16.47
26	25	Patrick Halgren	United States	1:07.14	26	1:04.90	26	2:12.04	+16.64
27	53	Manuel Rachbauer	Austria	1:08.35	29	1:04.97	27	2:13.32	+17.92
28	38	Andrew Haraghey	United States	1:08.19	28	1:06.14	29	2:14.33	+18.93
29	41	Tomáš Vaverka	Czech Republic	1:09.38	30	1:06.02	28	2:15.40	+20.00
30	50	Yamato Aoki	Japan	1:10.99	31	1:07.44	31	2:18.43	+23.03
31	36	Masahiko Tokai	Japan	1:11.40	33	1:07.30	30	2:18.70	+23.30
32	56	Rémi Mazi	Belgium	1:11.16	32	1:10.01	32	2:21.17	+25.77
33	45	Tyler Carter	United States	1:13.32	34	1:11.60	33	2:24.92	+29.52
34	55	Samuel Fernández	Chile	1:25.00	35	1:21.03	34	2:46.03	+50.63
	46	Niu Shaojie	China	1:05.29	22	DNF	—N/a		
	16	Alexis Guimond	Canada	DNF	—N/a				
	23	Aaron Lindström	Sweden	DNF	—N/a				
	24	Thomas Grochar	Austria	DNF	—N/a				
	29	Robin Cuche	Switzerland	DNF	—N/a				
	32	Hilmar Orvarsson	Iceland	DNF	—N/a				
	48	Li Biao	China	DNF	—N/a				
	52	Arvid Skoglund	Sweden	DNF	—N/a				

== Sitting ==
Rank	Bib	Name	Country	Run 1	Rank	Run 2	Rank	Total	Difference
1st place, gold medalist(s)	65	Jesper Pedersen	Norway	57.91	1	56.29	1	1:54.20	–
2nd place, silver medalist(s)	61	René De Silvestro	Italy	1:00.02	3	57.48	2	1:57.50	+3.30
3rd place, bronze medalist(s)	60	Liang Zilu	China	1:01.55	4	59.37	3	2:00.92	+6.72
4	74	Enrique Plantey	Argentina	1:02.13	5	1:01.01	6	2:03.14	+8.94
5	59	Takeshi Suzuki	Japan	1:04.93	9	59.83	5	2:04.76	+10.56
6	75	Chen Liang	China	1:03.56	6	1:02.38	9	2:05.94	+11.74
7	62	Niels de Langen	Netherlands	1:06.92	15	59.58	4	2:06.50	+12.30
8	57	Taiki Morii	Japan	1:05.38	10	1:01.74	7	2:07.12	+12.92
9	66	Lou Braz-Dagand	France	1:04.11	7	1:03.66	12	2:07.77	+13.57
10	68	Floris Meijer	Netherlands	1:07.01	17	1:02.18	8	2:09.19	+14.99
11	88	Josh Hanlon	Australia	1:06.60	14	1:03.21	10	2:09.81	+15.61
12	90	Brian Rowland	Canada	1:06.07	12	1:04.15	13	2:10.22	+16.02
13	80	Jernej Slivnik	Slovenia	1:04.89	8	1:05.84	19	2:10.73	+16.53
14	73	Nicolás Bisquertt	Chile	1:05.80	11	1:05.41	17	2:11.21	+17.01
15	70	Han Sang-min	South Korea	1:06.99	16	1:04.63	16	2:11.62	+17.42
16	87	Jasmin Bambur	United States	1:07.80	20	1:04.23	14	2:12.03	+17.83
17	81	Pascal Christen	Switzerland	1:07.82	21	1:04.56	15	2:12.38	+18.18
18	67	Li Xiang	China	1:07.11	18	1:05.87	20	2:12.98	+18.78
19	84	Gong Zhaolin	China	1:06.42	13	1:07.53	23	2:13.95	+19.75
20	77	Ravi Drugan	United States	1:11.26	28	1:03.54	11	2:14.80	+20.60
21	89	Robert Enigl	United States	1:08.72	22	1:06.28	22	2:15.00	+20.80
22	82	Sam Tait	Australia	1:10.28	24	1:06.12	21	2:16.40	+22.20
23	86	Tetsu Fujiwara	Japan	1:10.28	24	1:08.62	25	2:18.90	+24.70
24	85	Pavel Bambousek	Czech Republic	1:13.15	31	1:05.83	18	2:18.98	+24.78
25	58	Matthew Ryan Brewer	United States	1:10.62	26	1:08.82	26	2:19.44	+25.24
26	92	Alex Slegg	Great Britain	1:12.52	30	1:08.38	24	2:20.90	+26.70
27	93	Petr Drahoš	Czech Republic	1:10.89	27	1:10.34	27	2:21.23	+27.02
28	72	Wang Hui	China	1:12.24	29	1:11.17	28	2:23.41	+29.21
29	94	Miguel Catalan	Chile	1:20.05	33	1:14.52	29	2:34.57	+40.37
30	95	Richard Dumity	Hungary	1:24.04	34	1:30.18	30	2:54.22	+1:00.02
	63	Akira Kano	Japan	1:07.36	19	DNF	—N/a		
	69	Jeroen Kampschreur	Netherlands	59.00	2	DNF	—N/a		
	83	Aaron Ewen	New Zealand	1:09.04	23	DNF	—N/a		
	91	Dan Sheen	Great Britain	1:15.28	32	DNF	—N/a		
	64	Corey Peters	New Zealand	DNF	—N/a				
	71	Igor Sikorski	Poland	DNF	—N/a				
	76	David Allen Williams	United States	DNF	—N/a				
	78	Arly Velásquez	Mexico	DNF	—N/a				
	79	Murat Pelit	Switzerland	DNF	—N/a				
	96	Orlando Pérez	Puerto Rico	DNF	—N/a				

== See also ==
- Alpine skiing at the 2022 Winter Olympics
