= Snowboard at the 2022 Winter Paralympics – Men's snowboard cross =

Men's snowboard cross at the XII Paralympic Winter Games
- Paralympic snowboarding
- Venue: Genting Snow Park
- Dates: 6–7 March 2022

Men's snowboard cross SB-LL1 at the XIII Paralympic Winter Games
- Competitors: 15 from 11 nations

Medalists
1st place, gold medalist(s)		Tyler Turner	Canada
2nd place, silver medalist(s)		Mike Schultz	United States
3rd place, bronze medalist(s)		Wu Zhongwei	China

Men's snowboard cross SB-LL2 at the XIII Paralympic Winter Games
- Competitors: 23 from 12 nations

Medalists
1st place, gold medalist(s)		Matti Suur-Hamari	Finland
2nd place, silver medalist(s)		Garrett Geros	United States
3rd place, bronze medalist(s)		Ben Tudhope	Australia

Men's snowboard cross UL at the XIII Paralympic Winter Games
- Competitors: 18 from 10 nations

Medalists
1st place, gold medalist(s)		Ji Lijia	China
2nd place, silver medalist(s)		Wang Pengyao	China
3rd place, bronze medalist(s)		Zhu Yonggang	China

The men's snowboard cross competition of the 2022 Winter Paralympics was held at Genting Snow Park from 6–7 March 2022.

== Medal table ==
Rank	Nation	Gold	Silver	Bronze	Total
1	China (CHN)	1	1	2	4
2	Canada (CAN)	1	0	0	1
2	Finland (FIN)	1	0	0	1
4	United States (USA)	0	2	0	2
5	Australia (AUS)	0	0	1	1
Totals (5 entries)		3	3	3	9

== Snowboard cross SB-LL1 ==
The qualification was held on 6 March.

Quarterfinals to finals were held on 7 March.

=== Qualification ===
Rank	Name	Country	Run 1	Run 2	Best	Notes
1	Tyler Turner	Canada	1:04.74	1:04.24	1:04.24	Q
2	Wu Zhongwei	China	1:05.03	1:06.78	1:05.03	Q
3	Mike Schultz	United States	1:05.73	DSQ	1:05.73	Q
4	Liu Yiyang	China	1:07.81	1:07.17	1:07.17	Q
5	Noah Elliott	United States	1:07.51	1:07.32	1:07.32	Q
6	Daichi Oguri	Japan	1:08.34	1:07.69	1:07.69	Q
7	Junta Kosuda	Japan	1:08.89	DNF	1:08.89	Q
8	Chris Vos	Netherlands	1:25.48	1:09.02	1:09.02	Q
9	Bruno Bošnjak	Croatia	1:12.73	1:09.27	1:09.27	Q
10	Liu Kaiyang	China	1:09.91	1:09.67	1:09.67	Q
11	Christian Schmiedt	Germany	1:27.44	1:11.36	1:11.36	Q
12	Rene Eckhart	Austria	1:13.15	1:14.87	1:13.15	Q
13	André Barbieri	Brazil	1:18.30	1:19.48	1:18.30	Q
14	Mihăiță Papară	Romania	1:26.89	1:18.98	1:18.98	Q
-	Víctor González	Spain	DQB	DQB	DQB	DQB

==== Quarterfinals ====
Heat 1

Rank	Name	Country	Notes
1	Tyler Turner	Canada	Q
2	Chris Vos	Netherlands	Q
3	Bruno Bošnjak	Croatia	

Heat 2

Rank	Name	Country	Notes
1	Liu Yiyang	China	Q
2	Noah Elliott	United States	Q
3	Rene Eckhart	Austria	
4	André Barbieri	Brazil	

Heat 3

Rank	Name	Country	Notes
1	Mike Schultz	United States	Q
2	Daichi Oguri	Japan	Q
3	Christian Schmiedt	Germany	
3	Mihăiță Papară	Romania	

Heat 4

Rank	Name	Country	Notes
1	Wu Zhongwei	China	Q
2	Junta Kosuda	Japan	Q
3	Liu Kaiyang	China	

==== Semifinals ====
Heat 1

Rank	Name	Country	Notes
1	Tyler Turner	Canada	Q
2	Chris Vos	Netherlands	Q
3	Noah Elliott	United States	
4	Liu Yiyang	China	

Heat 2

Rank	Name	Country	Notes
1	Mike Schultz	United States	
2	Wu Zhongwei	China	
3	Junta Kosuda	Japan	
4	Daichi Oguri	Japan	

==== Finals ====
Small final

Rank	Name	Country	Notes
5	Daichi Oguri	Japan	
6	Noah Elliott	United States	
7	Junta Kosuda	Japan	
8	Liu Yiyang	China	

Big final

Rank	Name	Country	Notes
1st place, gold medalist(s)	Tyler Turner	Canada	
2nd place, silver medalist(s)	Mike Schultz	United States	
3rd place, bronze medalist(s)	Wu Zhongwei	China	
4	Chris Vos	Netherlands	

== Snowboard cross SB-LL2 ==
The qualification was held on 6 March.

Quarterfinals to finals were held on 7 March.

=== Qualification ===
Rank	Name	Country	Run 1	Run 2	Best	Notes
1	Matti Suur-Hamari	Finland	1:01.93	1:01.73	1:01.73	Q
2	Garrett Geros	United States	1:03.41	1:02.46	1:02.46	Q
3	Alex Massie	Canada	1:02.65	1:03.34	1:02.65	Q
4	Ben Tudhope	Australia	1:02.76	1:02.77	1:02.76	Q
5	Keith Gabel	United States	1:02.84	1:02.83	1:02.83	Q
6	Takahito Ichikawa	Japan	1:04.33	1:03.63	1:03.63	Q
7	Sun Qi	China	1:03.90	1:04.05	1:03.90	Q
8	Keiji Okamoto	Japan	1:04.77	1:03.95	1:03.95	Q
9	Laurent Vaglica	France	1:27.70	1:04.30	1:04.30	Q
10	Lee Jehyuk	South Korea	1:04.71	1:04.53	1:04.53	Q
11	Owen Pick	Great Britain	DSQ	1:04.58	1:04.58	Q
12	Ollie Hill	Great Britain	1:16.74	1:05.16	1:05.16	Q
13	Mathias Menendez-Garcia	France	1:06.39	1:06.30	1:06.30	Q
14	Liu Gengliang	China	1:07.97	1:06.76	1:06.76	Q
15	Zachary Miller	United States	1:07.11	1:07.40	1:07.11	Q
16	Shinji Tabuchi	Japan	1:07.36	1:07.72	1:07.36	Q
17	Andy MacLeod	Great Britain	1:08.23	1:08.43	1:08.23	
18	Xu Xiang	China	1:08.25	1:08.52	1:08.25	
19	Matthias Keller	Germany	1:08.98	1:09.67	1:08.98	
20	Wojciech Taraba	Poland	1:12.72	1:10.40	1:10.40	
21	Bernhard Hammerl	Austria	1:18.47	DNF	1:18.47	
22	Manuel Ness	Germany	1:19.33	1:18.83	1:18.83	
	Yan Wendi	China	DNF	DNF	DNF	

==== Quarterfinals ====
Heat 1

Rank	Name	Country	Notes
1	Matti Suur-Hamari	Finland	Q
2	Keiji Okamoto	Japan	Q
3	Shinji Tabuchi	Japan	
	Laurent Vaglica	France	DNS

Heat 2

Rank	Name	Country	Notes
1	Keith Gabel	United States	Q
2	Ben Tudhope	Australia	Q
3	Ollie Hill	Great Britain	
4	Mathias Menendez-Garcia	France	

Heat 3

Rank	Name	Country	Notes
1	Alex Massie	Canada	Q
2	Takahito Ichikawa	Japan	Q
3	Owen Pick	Great Britain	
4	Liu Gengliang	China	

Heat 4

Rank	Name	Country	Notes
1	Garrett Geros	United States	Q
2	Sun Qi	China	Q
3	Zach Miller	United States	
4	Lee Jehyuk	South Korea	

==== Semifinals ====
Heat 1

Rank	Name	Country	Notes
1	Matti Suur-Hamari	Finland	Q
2	Ben Tudhope	Australia	Q
3	Keith Gabel	United States	
4	Keiji Okamoto	Japan	

Heat 2

Rank	Name	Country	Notes
1	Sun Qi	China	Q
2	Garrett Geros	United States	Q
3	Alex Massie	Canada	
4	Takahito Ichikawa	Japan	

==== Finals ====
Small final

Rank	Name	Country	Notes
5	Takahito Ichikawa	Japan	
6	Alex Massie	Canada	
7	Keith Gabel	United States	
8	Keiji Okamoto	Japan	

Big final

Rank	Name	Country	Notes
1st place, gold medalist(s)	Matti Suur-Hamari	Finland	
2nd place, silver medalist(s)	Garrett Geros	United States	
3rd place, bronze medalist(s)	Ben Tudhope	Australia	
4	Sun Qi	China	

== Snowboard cross SB-UL ==
The qualification was held on 6 March.

Quarterfinals to finals were held on 7 March.

=== Qualification ===
Rank	Name	Country	Run 1	Run 2	Best	Notes
1	Zhu Yonggang	China	1:04.11	1:02.81	1:02.81	Q
2	Yang Jian	China	1:04.19	1:03.03	1:03.03	Q
3	Wang Pengyao	China	1:03.26	1:03.12	1:03.12	Q
4	Ji Lijia	China	1:03.34	1:04.57	1:03.34	Q
5	Jacopo Luchini	Italy	1:03.34	1:22.14	1:03.34	Q
6	Maxime Montaggioni	France	1:03.70	1:03.72	1:03.70	Q
7	Zhang Yiqi	China	1:03.89	1:05.48	1:03.89	Q
8	Mike Minor	United States	1:03.96	1:15.83	1:03.96	Q
9	James Barnes-Miller	Great Britain	1:04.53	1:04.02	1:04.02	Q
10	Jiang Zihao	China	1:04.09	1:05.17	1:04.09	Q
11	Masataka Oiwane	Japan	1:04.18	1:12.10	1:04.18	Q
12	Mirko Moro	Italy	1:07.64	1:06.27	1:06.27	Q
13	Riccardo Cardani	Italy	1:07.92	1:08.29	1:07.92	Q
14	Lee Chungmin	South Korea	1:34.74	1:09.73	1:09.73	Q
15	Konstantinos Petrakis	Greece	1:11.03	1:12.13	1:11.03	Q
16	Park Suhyeok	South Korea	1:11.56	1:11.61	1:11.56	Q
17	Michael Spivey	United States	1:13.92	1:12.06	1:12.06	
18	Matti Sairanen	Finland	1:14.99	1:13.52	1:13.52	

==== Quarterfinals ====
Heat 1

Rank	Name	Country	Notes
1	Zhu Yonggang	China	Q
2	James Barnes-Miller	Great Britain	Q
3	Mike Minor	United States	
4	Suhyeok Park	South Korea	

Heat 2

Rank	Name	Country	Notes
1	Ji Lijia	China	Q
2	Jacopo Luchini	Italy	Q
3	Riccardo Cardani	Italy	
4	Mirko Moro	Italy	

Heat 3

Rank	Name	Country	Notes
1	Wang Pengyao	China	Q
2	Masataka Oiwane	Japan	Q
3	Maxime Montaggioni	France	
4	Chungmin Lee	South Korea	

Heat 4

Rank	Name	Country	Notes
1	Zhang Yiqi	China	Q
2	Jiang Zihao	China	Q
3	Yang Jian	China	
4	Konstantinos Petrakis	Greece	

==== Semifinals ====
Heat 1

Rank	Name	Country	Notes
1	Ji Lijia	China	Q
2	Zhu Yonggang	China	Q
3	Jacopo Luchini	Italy	
4	James Bernes-Miller	Great Britain	

Heat 2

Rank	Name	Country	Notes
1	Wang Pengyao	China	Q
2	Zhang Yiqi	China	Q
3	Jiang Zihao	China	
4	Masataka Oiwane	Japan	

==== Finals ====
Small final

Rank	Name	Country	Notes
5	James Barnes-Miller	Great Britain	
6	Jacopo Luchini	Italy	
7	Jiang Zihao	China	
8	Masataka Oiwane	Japan	

Big final

Rank	Name	Country	Notes
1st place, gold medalist(s)	Ji Lijia	China	
2nd place, silver medalist(s)	Wang Pengyao	China	
3rd place, bronze medalist(s)	Zhu Yonggang	China	
	Zhang Yiqi	China	DSQ

== See also ==
- Snowboarding at the 2022 Winter Olympics
