= South Korea at the 2022 Winter Paralympics =

- Flag of South Korea
- IPC code: KOR
- NPC: Korean Paralympic Committee
- Website: www.kosad.or.kr (in Korean)

in Beijing, China 4 March 2022 – 13 March 2022
- Competitors: 31 (29 men and 2 women) in 6 sports
- Flag bearer: Baek Hye-jin
- Medals: Gold 0 Silver 0 Bronze 0 Total 0

Winter Paralympics appearances (overview)
- 1992; 1994; 1998; 2002; 2006; 2010; 2014; 2018; 2022; 2026

South Korea competed at the 2022 Winter Paralympics in Beijing, China which took place between 4–13 March 2022.

== Competitors ==
The following is the list of number of competitors participating at the Games per sport/discipline.

Sport	Men	Women	Total
Alpine skiing	2	1	3
Biathlon	(2)	0	(2) (Note: Sin Eui-hyun, Won Y. took part in two sports biathlon and cross-country skiing.)
Cross-country skiing	3	0	3
Para ice hockey	17	0	17
Snowboarding	3	0	3
Wheelchair curling	4	1	5
Total	29	2	31

== Alpine skiing ==
South Korea competed in alpine skiing.

Men

Athlete	Event	Run 1		Run 2		Total	
Athlete	Event	Time	Rank	Time	Rank	Time	Rank
Han Sang-min	Downhill, sitting	—N/a				1:26.69	12
Han Sang-min	Super-G, sitting	—N/a				1:19.43	18
Han Sang-min	Giant slalom, sitting	1:06.99	16	did not advance			
Hwang Min-gyu; Guide: Han Se-hyeon	Giant slalom, visually impaired	1:05.23	7	DNF			
Hwang Min-gyu; Guide: Han Se-hyeon	Slalom, visually impaired	DNF					
Hwang Min-gyu; Guide: Han Se-hyeon	Super combined, visually impaired	1:21.97	9	49.95	7	2:11.42	7

Women

Athlete	Event	Run 1		Run 2		Total	
Athlete	Event	Time	Rank	Time	Rank	Time	Rank
Sara Choi; Guide: Kim Yoo-seong	Giant slalom, visually impaired	1:06.71	11	1:08.53	10	2:15.24	11
Sara Choi; Guide: Kim Yoo-seong	Slalom, visually impaired	55.33	12	54.04	11	1:49.37	10

== Biathlon ==
South Korea competed in biathlon.

Athlete	Class	Event	Missed shots	Time	Rank
Sin Eui-hyun	LW12	Men's sprint, sitting	3	20:46.9	12
Sin Eui-hyun	LW12	Men's middle distance, sitting	6	34:05.7	11
Sin Eui-hyun	LW12	Men's individual, sitting	2	42:50.6	8
Woo Yoo-min	LW11.5	Men's sprint, sitting	1	24:10.6	20
Woo Yoo-min	LW11.5	Men's middle distance, sitting	0	38:21.8	17
Woo Yoo-min	LW11.5	Men's individual, sitting	0	52:11.8	19

== Cross-country skiing ==
South Korea competed in cross-country skiing.

Athlete	Class	Event	Qualification		Semifinal		Final	
Athlete	Class	Event	Time	Rank	Time	Rank	Time	Rank
Jeong Jae-seok	LW10.5	Men's print, sitting	2:55.85	33	Did not advance			
Jeong Jae-seok	LW10.5	Men's middle distance, sitting	—N/a				41:30.4	28
Jeong Jae-seok	LW10.5	Men's long distance, sitting	—N/a				58:19.6	22
Sin Eui-hyun	LW12	Men's sprint, sitting	2:28.60	14	Did not advance			
Sin Eui-hyun	LW12	Men's middle distance, sitting	—N/a				34:51.4	10
Sin Eui-hyun	LW12	Men's long distance, sitting	—N/a				49:26.2	8
Won Yoo-min	LW11.5	Men's sprint, sitting	2:48.51	28	Did not advance			

== Para ice hockey ==
South Korea competed in para ice hockey.

Summary

Team	Event	Preliminary round			Quarterfinal	Semifinal	BM	
Team	Event	Opposition Result	Opposition Result	Rank	Opposition Result	Opposition Result	Opposition Result	Rank
South Korea	Mixed tournament	United States; L 1–9	Canada; L 0–6	3 QQ	Italy; W 4–0	Canada; L 0–11	China; L 0–4	4

Preliminary round

Pos	Team	Pld	W	OTW	OTL	L	GF	GA	GD	Pts	Qualification
1	United States	2	2	0	0	0	14	1	+13	6	Semifinals
2	Canada	2	1	0	0	1	6	5	+1	3	Semifinals
3	South Korea	2	0	0	0	2	1	15	−14	0	Quarterfinals
−	~~RPC~~	0	0	0	0	0	0	0	0	0	Disqualified

Source: Beijing 2022

5 March 2022; 13:05	United States	5–0 (2–0, 2–0, 1–0)	Canada	Beijing National Indoor Stadium, Beijing

Game reference

Jen Lee
Goalies
Dominic Larocque
Adam Kingsmill
Referee:
(Norway) Owe Lüthcke
Linesmen:
(Sweden) Andreas Lundén
(Sweden) Tony Rundström

Pauls (Farmer, Wallace) (PP) – 05:44	1–0
Roybal (Farmer) – 14:48	2–0
Jones (Wallace, Grove) – 25:27	3–0
Misiewicz (Farmer, Pauls) – 28:57	4–0
Farmer (McKee, Misiewicz) – 41:26	5–0

2 min
Penalties
4 min
26
Shots
9

8 March 2022; 13:05	Canada	6–0 (2–0, 1–0, 3–0)	South Korea	Beijing National Indoor Stadium, Beijing

Game reference

Dominic Larocque
Goalies
Lee Jae-woong
Choi Hyuk-jun
Referee:
(Norway) Kenneth Danielsen
Linesmen:
(Serbia) Tibor Fazekaš
(Austria) David Nothegger

Hickey (Dunn, Bridges) – 07:14	1–0
Dunn (Armstrong) – 07:35	2–0
Dunn (Jacobs-Webb, Riley) – 21:08	3–0
Bridges (Dixon, McGregor) – 34:20	4–0
McGregor – 35:39	5–0
Dunn (Dixon, Bridges) (PP) – 42:50	6–0

29 min
Penalties
10 min
42
Shots
4

Quarterfinals

9 March 2022; 16:35	South Korea	4–0 (1–0, 1–0, 2–0)	Italy	Beijing National Indoor Stadium, Beijing; Attendance: 1,206

Game reference

Choi Hyuk-jun
Goalies
Gabriele Araudo
Referee:
(United States) Bobby Esposito
Linesmen:
(Canada) Matt Fergenbaum
(Sweden) Andreas Lundén

Jang D. – 03:30	1–0
Jung (Jang D., Lee Jo.) – 25:53	2–0
Lee Jo. (Jung) – 30:25	3–0
Jang D. (Jang J.) (ENG) – 42:38	4–0

10 min
Penalties
12 min
17
Shots
15

Semifinal

11 March 2022; 12:05	Canada	11–0 (3–0, 4–0, 4–0)	South Korea	Beijing National Indoor Stadium, Beijing; Attendance: 943

Game reference

Dominic Larocque
Adam Kingsmill
Goalies
Choi Hyuk-jun
Lee Jae-woong
Referee:
(Denmark) Jacob Grumsen
Linesmen:
(Austria) David Nothegger
(Czech Republic) Jan Vaněk

Hickey (Dixon, McGregor) – 09:48	1–0
Bridges (Delaney) (PP) – 13:37	2–0
McGregor (Hickey, Westlake) – 14:41	3–0
Bridges (Dunn, Dixon) – 15:45	4–0
Bridges (Dunn, Hickey) – 18:11	5–0
McGregor (Hickey) – 19:26	6–0
Westlake (McGregor, Hickey) – 19:57	7–0
McGregor (Westlake, Henry) – 32:15	8–0
Riley – 34:37	9–0
Jacobs-Webb (Dixon, Lehoux) – 37:37	10–0
McGregor (Henry, Lavin) – 44:18	11–0

8 min
Penalties
4 min
43
Shots
3

Bronze match

12 March 2022; 20:05	China	4–0 (1–0, 1–0, 2–0)	South Korea	Beijing National Indoor Stadium, Beijing; Attendance: 492

Game reference

Ji Yanzhao
Goalies
Lee Jae-woong
Referee:
(Canada) Kevin Webinger
Linesmen:
(Canada) Matt Fergenbaum
(Sweden) Tony Rundström

Wang Z. (Shen, Zhu) – 04:06	1–0
Shen – 16:00	2–0
Li (Shen, Zhu) – 43:15	3–0
Shen (Wang Z.) (ENG) – 44:48	4–0

22 min
Penalties
16 min
23
Shots
11

== Snowboarding ==
South Korea competed in snowboarding.

Slalom

Athlete	Event	Run 1	Run 2	Best	Rank
Lee Je-hyuk	Men's banked slalom, SB-LL2	1:15.83	1:14.39	1:14.39	16
Lee Chung-min	Men's banked slalom, SB-UL	1:14.01	1:13.65	1:13.65	12
Park Su-hyeok	Men's banked slalom, SB-UL	1:16.90	1:17.39	1:16.90	14

Snowboard cross

Athlete	Event	Seeding		Quarterfinal	Semifinal	Final	
Athlete	Event	Time	Rank	Position	Position	Position	Rank
Lee Je-hyuk	Men's snowboard cross, SB-LL2	1:04.53	10 Q	4	Did not advance		
Lee Chung-min	Men's snowboard cross, SB-UL	1:09.73	14 Q	4	Did not advance		
Park Su-hyeok	Men's snowboard cross, SB-UL	1:11.56	16 Q	4	Did not advance		

== Wheelchair curling ==
South Korea competed in wheelchair curling.

Summary

Team	Event	Group stage											Semifinal	Final / BM	
Team	Event	Opposition Score	Opposition Score	Opposition Score	Opposition Score	Opposition Score	Opposition Score	Opposition Score	Opposition Score	Opposition Score	Opposition Score	Rank	Opposition Score	Opposition Score	Rank
Go Seung-nam; Jang Jae-hyuk; Jung Sung-hun; Baek Hye-jin; Yoon Eun-gu	Mixed	LAT; L 4–8	SUI; L 7–8	NOR; W 9–4	CHN; L 4–9	CAN; W 9–4	SVK; L 2–7	EST; W 5–2	GBR; W 8–6	USA; L 6–7	SWE; W 10–4	6	did not advance		

Round robin Final round-robin standings

Key
Teams to Playoffs

Country	Skip	W	L	W–L	PF	PA	EW	EL	BE	SE	S%	DSC
China	Wang Haitao	8	2	–	68	39	36	28	2	13	71%	122.32
Slovakia	Radoslav Ďuriš	7	3	2–0	65	57	40	33	1	16	65%	95.19
Sweden	Viljo Petersson-Dahl	7	3	1–1	66	52	37	35	3	18	68%	91.08
Canada	Mark Ideson	7	3	0–2	69	50	36	33	2	11	71%	95.29
United States	Matthew Thums	5	5	1–0	60	75	32	39	2	6	60%	70.98
South Korea	Go Seung-nam	5	5	0–1	64	59	35	37	0	11	64%	103.20
Norway	Jostein Stordahl	4	6	2–0	60	64	37	38	2	13	64%	107.82
Great Britain	Hugh Nibloe	4	6	1–1	67	56	37	36	0	16	62%	134.75
Latvia	Poļina Rožkova	4	6	0–2	61	71	40	32	0	18	63%	100.43
Estonia	Andrei Koitmäe	3	7	–	51	69	32	41	2	13	61%	106.21
Switzerland	Laurent Kneubühl	1	9	–	48	87	32	42	0	8	56%	109.27

Wheelchair curling round robin summary table
Pos.	Country	Canada	China	Estonia	Great Britain	Japan	Norway	Slovakia	South Korea	Sweden	Switzerland	United States	Record
4	Canada	—N/a	7–3	9–3	6–3	10–3	7–6	8–9	4–9	3–6	8–4	7–4	7–3
1	China	3–7	—	9–3	6–3	9–2	7–4	7–5	9–4	1–5	7–4	10–2	8–2
10	Estonia	3–9	3–9	—	5–10	6–5	8–3	6–7	2–5	4–6	8–6	6–9	3–7
8	Great Britain	3–6	3–6	10–5	—	8–4	5–7	3–7	6–8	4–6	15–1	10–6	4–6
9	Latvia	3–10	2–9	5–6	4–8	—	6–8	8–4	8–4	9–7	9–7	7–8	4–6
7	Norway	6–7	4–7	3–8	7–5	8–6	—	9–3	4–9	6–8	8–5	5–6	4–6
2	Slovakia	9–8	5–7	7–6	7–3	4–8	3–9	—	7–2	6–5	8–6	9–3	7–3
6	South Korea	9–4	4–9	5–2	8–6	4–8	9–4	2–7	—	10–4	7–8	6–7	5–5
3	Sweden	6–3	5–1	6–4	6–4	7–9	8–6	5–6	4–10	—	9–2	10–7	7–3
11	Switzerland	4–8	4–7	6–8	1–15	7–9	5–8	6–8	8–7	2–9	—	5–8	1–9
5	United States	4–7	2–10	9–6	6–10	8–7	6–5	3–9	7–6	7–10	8–5	—	5–5

Draw 2
Saturday, March 5, 19:35

Sheet A	1	2	3	4	5	6	7	8	Final
Latvia (Rožkova)	1	0	3	1	0	2	1	X	8
South Korea (Go) 🔨	0	2	0	0	2	0	0	X	4

Draw 4
Sunday, March 6, 14:35

Sheet B	1	2	3	4	5	6	7	8	EE	Final
Switzerland (Kneubühl) 🔨	1	0	1	0	3	0	0	2	1	8
South Korea (Go)	0	4	0	1	0	1	1	0	0	7

Draw 5
Sunday, March 6, 19:35

Sheet C	1	2	3	4	5	6	7	8	Final
South Korea (Go) 🔨	2	0	2	1	0	0	4	X	9
Norway (Stordahl)	0	2	0	0	1	1	0	X	4

Draw 7
Monday, March 7, 14:35

Sheet B	1	2	3	4	5	6	7	8	Final
South Korea (Go) 🔨	0	3	0	0	1	0	X	X	4
China (Wang)	2	0	1	1	0	5	X	X	9

Draw 9
Tuesday, March 8, 9:35

Sheet D	1	2	3	4	5	6	7	8	Final
South Korea (Baek)	0	1	1	2	0	4	0	1	9
Canada (Ideson) 🔨	0	0	0	0	2	0	2	0	4

Draw 10
Tuesday, March 8, 14:35

Sheet A	1	2	3	4	5	6	7	8	Final
Slovakia (Ďuriš)	1	1	1	1	1	0	2	X	7
South Korea (Go) 🔨	0	0	0	0	0	2	0	X	2

Draw 12
Wednesday, March 9, 9:35

Sheet C	1	2	3	4	5	6	7	8	Final
Estonia (Koitmäe)	0	0	0	1	0	0	1	X	2
South Korea (Jang) 🔨	1	0	2	0	1	1	0	X	5

Draw 14
Wednesday, March 9, 19:35

Sheet A	1	2	3	4	5	6	7	8	Final
South Korea (Jang) 🔨	3	0	2	0	0	2	0	1	8
Great Britain (Nibloe)	0	1	0	2	1	0	2	0	6

Draw 16
Thursday, March 10, 14:35

Sheet D	1	2	3	4	5	6	7	8	Final
South Korea (Jang)	1	0	2	0	2	0	1	0	6
United States (Thums) 🔨	0	2	0	1	0	2	0	2	7

Draw 17
Thursday, March 10, 19:35

Sheet C	1	2	3	4	5	6	7	8	Final
South Korea (Jang) 🔨	1	1	1	0	0	5	2	X	10
Sweden (Petersson-Dahl)	0	0	0	1	3	0	0	X	4

== See also ==
- South Korea at the Paralympics
- South Korea at the 2022 Winter Olympics
