= Snowboard at the 2022 Winter Paralympics =

Snowboarding at the XIII Paralympic Winter Games
- Para snowboarding pictogram
- Venue: Genting Snow Park
- Dates: 6–11 March 2022
- Competitors: 75 from 21 nations

Snowboarding was one of the competitions at the 2022 Winter Paralympics in Beijing, China. In total, eight medal events were held.

== Classification ==
Para-snowboarding is divided into three classification categories.

SB-LL1
Athletes competing in the class SB-LL1 have significant impairment to one leg, such as amputation above the knee, or "a significant combined impairment in two legs", affecting their balance, their board-control and their ability to navigate uneven terrain. Athletes with annotations will use prostheses during racing. events for female athletes in the category SB-LL1 at the 2022 Winter Paralympics is a demonstration classification.
SB-LL2
Athletes competing in the class SB-LL2 have impairment to one or both legs "with less activity limitation", such as below-knee amputation.
SB-UL
Athletes competing in the class SB-UL have upper limb impairments, affecting balance. Events for female athletes in the category SB-UL at the 2022 Winter Paralympics is a demonstration classification.

SB-LL1 was removed from the programme for female athletes in June 2019 as an insufficient number of athletes competed in this class at the 2019 World Para Snowboard Championships. In January 2022, American snowboarder Brenna Huckaby, classified as SB-LL1 snowboarder, won a court decision to allow her to compete at the 2022 Winter Paralympics. French snowboarder Cécile Hernandez learned days before her competition that she was also allowed to compete. They competed in SB-LL2 classified events.

== Medal summary ==
=== Medal table ===
The ranking in the table is based on information provided by the International Paralympic Committee (IPC) and will be consistent with IPC convention in its published medal tables. By default, the table will be ordered by the number of gold medals the athletes from a nation have won (in this context, a "nation" is an entity represented by a National Paralympic Committee). The number of silver medals is taken into consideration next and then the number of bronze medals. If nations are still tied, equal ranking is given and they are listed alphabetically by IPC country code.

* Host nation (China)

Rank	Nation	Gold	Silver	Bronze	Total
1	China (CHN)*	3	3	4	10
2	France (FRA)	2	0	0	2
3	United States (USA)	1	2	1	4
4	Canada (CAN)	1	1	1	3
5	Finland (FIN)	1	1	0	2
6	Netherlands (NED)	0	1	0	1
7	Australia (AUS)	0	0	1	1
7	Great Britain (GBR)	0	0	1	1
Totals (8 entries)		8	8	8	24

=== Women's events ===
Event	Class	Gold		Silver		Bronze	
Banked slalom	SB-LL2	Brenna Huckaby; United States	1:17.28	Geng Yanhong; China	1:17.38	Li Tiantian; China	1:17.46
Snowboard cross	SB-LL2	Cécile Hernandez; France		Lisa DeJong; Canada		Brenna Huckaby; United States	

=== Men's events ===
Event	Class	Gold		Silver		Bronze	
Banked slalom	SB-LL1	Wu Zhongwei; China	1:10.85	Chris Vos; Netherlands	1:12.06	Tyler Turner; Canada	1:12.84
Banked slalom	SB-LL2	Sun Qi; China	1:09.73	Matti Suur-Hamari; Finland	1:09.98	Ollie Hill; Great Britain	1:10.45
Banked slalom	SB-UL	Maxime Montaggioni; France	1:09.41	Ji Lijia; China	1:09.86	Zhu Yonggang; China	1:10.14
Snowboard cross	SB-LL1	Tyler Turner; Canada		Mike Schultz; United States		Wu Zhongwei; China	
Snowboard cross	SB-LL2	Matti Suur-Hamari; Finland		Garrett Geros; United States		Ben Tudhope; Australia	
Snowboard cross	SB-UL	Ji Lijia; China		Wang Pengyao; China		Zhu Yonggang; China	

== Participating nations ==
- Australia (1)
- Austria (2)
- Brazil (1)
- Canada (4)
- China (18)
- Croatia (1)
- Finland (3)
- France (4)
- Germany (3)
- Great Britain (4)
- Greece (1)
- Iran (2)
- Italy (3)
- Japan (6)
- Netherlands (3)
- Poland (1)
- Romania (1)
- South Korea (3)
- Spain (1)
- Switzerland (1)
- United States (12)

== See also ==
- Snowboarding at the 2022 Winter Olympics
