= Tyler Turner (snowboarder) =

Canadian Paralympic snowboarder

Personal information
- Born: 26 August 1988 (age 37) Saskatoon, Saskatchewan, Canada
Medal record
Men's para snowboarding
Representing Canada
Winter Paralympic Games
Gold medal – first place	2022 Beijing	Snowboard cross
Bronze medal – third place	2022 Beijing	Banked slalom
Bronze medal – third place	2026 Milano Cortina	Snowboard cross
World Para Snow Sports Championships
Gold medal – first place	2021 Lillehammer	Team event
Gold medal – first place	2021 Lillehammer	Snowboard cross
Bronze medal – third place	2021 Lillehammer	Dual banked slalom

Tyler Turner (born 26 August 1988) is a Canadian para-snowboarder who competes in the SB-LL1 category. He won the gold medal in the men's snowboard cross SB-LL1 event at the 2022 Winter Paralympics held in Beijing, China. He also won the bronze medal in the men's banked slalom SB-LL1 event.

== Life and career ==
Turner won the bronze medal in the men's dual banked slalom at the 2021 World Para Snow Sports Championships held in Lillehammer, Norway. He also won the silver medal in the men's snowboard cross event. Turner and Alex Massie won the gold medal in the men's team event.

Turner competed in snowboarding at the 2022 Winter Paralympics in Beijing, China.

In 2023, Turner competed on the ninth season of The Amazing Race Canada with his girlfriend Kayleen, where they finished in second place.

In 2026 he starred in All In, an AMI-tv documentary series in which he tries out a range of other sports and adventures.
