= Great Britain at the 2022 Winter Paralympics =

- Flag of the United Kingdom
- IPC code: GBR
- NPC: British Paralympic Association
- Website: www.paralympics.org.uk

in Beijing, China 4 March 2022 – 13 March 2022
- Competitors: 24 (18 men and 6 women) in 5 sports
- Flag bearers (opening): Meggan Dawson-Farrell; Gregor Ewan
- Flag bearers (closing): Andrew Simpson; Neil Simpson
- Medals Ranked 14th: Gold 1 Silver 1 Bronze 4 Total 6

Winter Paralympics appearances (overview)
- 1976; 1980; 1984; 1988; 1992; 1994; 1998; 2002; 2006; 2010; 2014; 2018; 2022; 2026

Great Britain competed at the 2022 Winter Paralympics in Beijing, China which took place between 4–13 March 2022.

== Medallists ==
Medals by sport
Sport	1st place, gold medalist(s)	2nd place, silver medalist(s)	3rd place, bronze medalist(s)	Total
Alpine skiing	1	1	3	5
Snowboarding	0	0	1	1
Total	1	1	4	6

Medals by date
Day	Date	1st place, gold medalist(s)	2nd place, silver medalist(s)	3rd place, bronze medalist(s)	Total
Day 1	5 March	0	0	1	1
Day 2	6 March	1	1	0	2
Day 3	7 March	0	0	2	2
Day 4	8 March	0	0	0	0
Day 5	9 March	0	0	0	0
Day 6	10 March	0	0	0	0
Day 7	11 March	0	0	1	1
Total		1	1	4	6

Medals by gender
Gender	1st place, gold medalist(s)	2nd place, silver medalist(s)	3rd place, bronze medalist(s)	Total
Male	1	0	2	3
Female	0	1	2	3
Mixed	0	0	0	0
Total	1	1	4	6

Medal	Name	Sport	Event	Date
Gold	Neil Simpson; Guide: Andrew Simpson	Alpine skiing	Men's Super-G, vision impaired	6 March
Silver	Menna Fitzpatrick; Guide: Gary Smith	Alpine skiing	Women's Super-G, vision impaired	6 March
Bronze	Millie Knight; Guide: Brett Wild	Alpine skiing	Women's downhill, vision impaired	5 March
Bronze	Menna Fitzpatrick; Guide: Gary Smith	Alpine skiing	Women's super combined, vision impaired	7 March
Bronze	Neil Simpson; Guide: Andrew Simpson	Alpine skiing	Men's super combined, vision impaired	7 March
Bronze	Ollie Hill	Snowboarding	Men's banked slalom SB-LL2	11 March

=== Multiple medallists ===
After Pyeongchang 2018, Menna Fitzpatrick was Great Britain's most successful Winter Paralympian with four medals, all won at the 2018 Games. She added to that total at these Games.

Name	Medal	Sport	Event
Neil Simpson; Guide: Andrew Simpson	Gold; Bronze	Alpine skiing	Men's Super-G, vision impaired Men's super combined, vision impaired
Menna Fitzpatrick; Guide: Gary Smith	Silver; Bronze	Alpine skiing	Women's Super-G, vision impaired Women's super combined, vision impaired

== Medal and performance targets ==
On 13 January 2022, UK Sport confirmed a target of 5–9 medals for the Games.

Team GB medal target
Event	Medal target	2014 medals	2018 medals	Medals won	Target met
Overall	5–9	6	7	6	check

== Competitors ==
Sport	Men	Women	Total
Alpine skiing	7	3	10
Biathlon	3*	0	3*
Cross-country skiing	4*	1	5*
Snowboarding	4	0	4
Wheelchair curling	3	2	5
Total	18	6	24

- Steve Arnold, Callum Deboys and Scott Meenagh were selected to compete in both the biathlon and cross-country events.

== Alpine skiing ==
On 22 February 2022, ParalympicsGB named a team of eleven athletes (including four guides of visually impaired athletes) to compete in the alpine skiing events in Beijing. Menna Fitzpatrick is Britain's most successful Winter Paralympian having won four medals including a gold at Pyeongchang in 2018. Teammate Millie Knight also won three medals at the same Games. On the eve of the Games visually impaired guide skier Katie Guest was forced to withdraw after testing positive for Covid-19. Gary Smith had already been selected as a reserve guide and will take Guest's place alongside Menna Fitzpatrick.

Women

Athlete	Classification	Event	Run 1			Run 2			Final/Total		
Athlete	Classification	Event	Time	Diff	Rank	Time	Diff	Rank	Time	Diff	Rank
Menna Fitzpatrick; Guide: Gary Smith	Visually impaired	Downhill	—N/a						1:30.49	+10.99	5
Menna Fitzpatrick; Guide: Gary Smith	Visually impaired	Giant slalom	1:02.78	+8.70	7	1:04.89	+6.43	7	2:07.67	+15.13	7
Menna Fitzpatrick; Guide: Gary Smith	Visually impaired	Slalom	47.25	+3.13	5	49.51	+2.10	3	1:36.76	+5.23	4
Menna Fitzpatrick; Guide: Gary Smith	Visually impaired	Super-G	—N/a						1:18.79	+1.78	2nd place, silver medalist(s)
Menna Fitzpatrick; Guide: Gary Smith	Visually impaired	Super combined	1:22.25	+5.60	5	43.73	-	1	2:05.98	+2.59	3rd place, bronze medalist(s)
Millie Knight; Guide: Brett Wild	Visually impaired	Downhill	—N/a						1:23.20	+3.70	3rd place, bronze medalist(s)
Millie Knight; Guide: Brett Wild	Visually impaired	Giant slalom	1:03.35	+9.27	9	1:07.98	+9.52	9	2:11.33	+18.79	9
Millie Knight; Guide: Brett Wild	Visually impaired	Slalom	50.35	+6.23	9	51.12	+3.71	8	1:41.47	+9.94	8
Millie Knight; Guide: Brett Wild	Visually impaired	Super-G	—N/a						1:19.39	+2.38	4
Millie Knight; Guide: Brett Wild	Visually impaired	Super combined	1:21.49	+4.84	4	46.40	+2.67	3	2:07.89	+4.50	4
Shona Brownlee	Sitting										
Shona Brownlee	Sitting	Giant slalom	1:14.20	+12.44	9	1:17.88	+17.37	9	2:32.08	+29.81	9
Shona Brownlee	Sitting	Slalom	2:05.52	+1:17.02	9	1:18.03	+28.96	9	3:23.55	+1:45.69	9
Shona Brownlee	Sitting	Super-G	—N/a						1:48.23	+24.50	6
Shona Brownlee	Sitting	Super combined	1:46.91	+26.54	6	DNF			did not finish		

Men

Athlete	Classification	Event	Run 1			Run 2			Final/Total		
Athlete	Classification	Event	Time	Diff	Rank	Time	Diff	Rank	Time	Diff	Rank
Neil Simpson; Guide: Andrew Simpson	Visually impaired	Downhill	—N/a						1:17.13	+3.68	7
Neil Simpson; Guide: Andrew Simpson	Visually impaired	Giant slalom	1:00.81	+5.93	6	58.64	+5.21	5	1:59.45	+10.11	5
Neil Simpson; Guide: Andrew Simpson	Visually impaired	Slalom	1:01.75	+22.13	11	51.40	+4.52	3	1:53.15	+26.33	9
Neil Simpson; Guide: Andrew Simpson	Visually impaired	Super-G	—N/a						1:08.91	-	1st place, gold medalist(s)
Neil Simpson; Guide: Andrew Simpson	Visually impaired	Super combined	1:10.87	+1.75	5	41.94	+2.85	3	1:52.81	+3.01	3rd place, bronze medalist(s)
Dan Sheen	Sitting	Giant slalom	1:15.28	+17.37	32	DNF			Did not finish		
Dan Sheen	Sitting	Slalom	1:04.90	+23.71	25	DNF			Did not finish		
Alex Slegg	Sitting	Giant slalom	1:12.52	+14.61	30	1:08.38	+12.09	24	2:20.90	+26.70	26
Alex Slegg	Sitting	Slalom	54.88	+13.69	18	DSQ					
James Whitley	Standing	Downhill	—N/a						1:19.05	+4.13	9
James Whitley	Standing	Giant slalom	1:01.08	+3.48	12	57.30	+0.60	2	1:58.38	+2.98	6
James Whitley	Standing	Slalom	48.32	+7.84	18	54.27	+5.26	7	1:42.59	+12.98	8
James Whitley	Standing	Super-G	—N/a						1:14.88	+5.77	19
James Whitley	Standing	Super combined	DSQ			Did not advance					

== Biathlon ==
On 22 February 2022, ParalympicsGB announced the selection of the three members of the cross-country team who will also compete in the biathlon. Scott Meenagh will be attending his second Games having also competed in both biathlon and cross-country skiing in 2018. On the eve of the Games Steve Arnold tested positive for Covid-19 and missed the first two biathlon events in which he was due to compete. However, he later recovered and was able to join the British team with a view to competing in the final event. Unfortunately, on his arrival in Beijing he again tested positive for Covid-19 and was forced to withdraw from the event.

Men

Athlete	Classification	Event	Result	Rank
Steve Arnold	Sitting	Men's 12.5 km	DNS	
Callum Deboys	Sitting	Men's 6.0 km	22:32.0	17
Callum Deboys	Sitting	Men's 10.0 km	38.37.9	18
Callum Deboys	Sitting	Men's 12.5 km	49:53.8	18
Scott Meenagh	Sitting	Men's 6.0 km	20:34.7	9
Scott Meenagh	Sitting	Men's 10.0 km	33:11.7	9
Scott Meenagh	Sitting	Men's 12.5 km	41:32.5	6

== Cross-country skiing ==
On 22 February 2022, ParalympicsGB revealed the Nordic skiing team which had been selected for Beijing. Steve Thomas will be making his sixth Paralympics appearance having competed in ice sledge hockey in 2006 and in sailing at four successive Summer Paralympics between 2004-16. Hope Gordon will be the first British woman to compete in a Nordic skiing event at the Games. On the eve of the Games Steve Arnold tested positive for Covid-19 and missed the first cross-country event in which he was due to compete. However, he later recovered and was able to join the British team for the final events. Unfortunately, on his arrival in Beijing he again tested positive for Covid-19 but recovered in time to compete in his final two scheduled events.

Women

Athlete	Classification	Event	Qualification		Semifinal		Final	
Athlete	Classification	Event	Time	Rank	Time	Rank	Time	Rank
Hope Gordon	Sitting	1.5 km sprint	3:35.04	17	Did not advance			
Hope Gordon	Sitting	7.5 km	—N/a				38:01.4	16

Men

Athlete	Classification	Event	Qualification		Semifinal		Final	
Athlete	Classification	Event	Time	Rank	Time	Rank	Time	Rank
Steve Arnold	Sitting	1.5 km sprint	DNS		Did not advance			
Steve Arnold	Sitting	10 km	—N/a				43:04.6	29
Callum Deboys	Sitting	1.5 km sprint	2:37.00	22	Did not advance			
Callum Deboys	Sitting	10 km	—N/a				38:41.8	21
Scott Meenagh	Sitting	10 km	—N/a				36:16.8	16
Scott Meenagh	Sitting	18 km	—N/a				50:41.6	12
Steve Thomas	Sitting	1.5 km sprint	2:39.33	25	Did not advance			
Steve Thomas	Sitting	10 km	—N/a				44:17.5	32

Relay

Athletes	Event	Final	
Athletes	Event	Time	Rank
Steve Arnold; Callum Deboys; Scott Meenagh; Steve Thomas	4 x 2.5 km open relay	35:27.3	12

== Snowboarding ==
On 22 February 2022, ParalympicsGB announced the names of the four snowboarders who have been selected to represent their country in Beijing. James Barnes-Miller and Owen Pick will compete at their second Games having taken part when snowboarding made its inaugural Winter Paralympic appearance in 2018.

Men

Banked slalom

Athlete	Event	Run 1	Run 2	Best	Rank
Ollie Hill	Banked slalom, SB-LL2	1:10.45	1:10.51	1:10.45	3rd place, bronze medalist(s)
Andy MacLeod	Banked slalom, SB-LL2	1:18.52	1:16.55	1:16.55	20
Owen Pick	Banked slalom, SB-LL2	1:10.64	1:11.91	1:10.64	4
James Barnes-Miller	Banked slalom, SB-UL	1:12.39	1:13.12	1:12.39	9

Snowboard cross

Athlete	Event	Qualification				Quarterfinal	Semifinal	Final	
Athlete	Event	Run 1	Run 2	Best	Seed	Position	Position	Position	Rank
Ollie Hill	Snowboard cross, SB-LL2	1:16.74	1:05.16	1:05.16	12 Q	3	Did not advance		10
Andy MacLeod	Snowboard cross, SB-LL2	1:08.23	1:08.43	1:08.23	17	Did not advance			17
Owen Pick	Snowboard cross, SB-LL2	DSQ	1:04.58	1:04.58	11 Q	3	Did not advance		9
James Barnes-Miller	Snowboard cross, SB-UL	1:04.53	1:04.02	1:04.02	9 Q	2 Q	4 FB	1	5

Qualification legend: FA – Qualify to medal round; FB – Qualify to consolation round

== Wheelchair curling ==
Great Britain has qualified to compete in wheelchair curling. On 4 January 2022, Paralympics GB announced the selection of the team to represent Great Britain in Beijing. On 2 February 2022, it was announced that Charlotte McKenna had withdrawn from the team due to injury. Her replacement will be Gary Smith.

Summary

Team	Event	Group stage											Semifinal	Final / BM	
Team	Event	Opposition Score	Opposition Score	Opposition Score	Opposition Score	Opposition Score	Opposition Score	Opposition Score	Opposition Score	Opposition Score	Opposition Score	Rank	Opposition Score	Opposition Score	Rank
Gregor Ewan; Hugh Nibloe; David Melrose; Meggan Dawson-Farrell; Gary Smith	Mixed	NOR; L 5–7	USA; W 10–6	SUI; W 15–1	SVK; L 3–7	EST; W 10–5	SWE; L 4–6	CAN; L 3–6	KOR; L 6–8	CHN; L 3–6	LAT; W 8–4	8	Did not advance		

Round robin Final round-robin standings

Key
Teams to Playoffs

Country	Skip	W	L	W–L	PF	PA	EW	EL	BE	SE	S%	DSC
China	Wang Haitao	8	2	–	68	39	36	28	2	13	71%	122.32
Slovakia	Radoslav Ďuriš	7	3	2–0	65	57	40	33	1	16	65%	95.19
Sweden	Viljo Petersson-Dahl	7	3	1–1	66	52	37	35	3	18	68%	91.08
Canada	Mark Ideson	7	3	0–2	69	50	36	33	2	11	71%	95.29
United States	Matthew Thums	5	5	1–0	60	75	32	39	2	6	60%	70.98
South Korea	Go Seung-nam	5	5	0–1	64	59	35	37	0	11	64%	103.20
Norway	Jostein Stordahl	4	6	2–0	60	64	37	38	2	13	64%	107.82
Great Britain	Hugh Nibloe	4	6	1–1	67	56	37	36	0	16	62%	134.75
Latvia	Poļina Rožkova	4	6	0–2	61	71	40	32	0	18	63%	100.43
Estonia	Andrei Koitmäe	3	7	–	51	69	32	41	2	13	61%	106.21
Switzerland	Laurent Kneubühl	1	9	–	48	87	32	42	0	8	56%	109.27

Wheelchair curling round robin summary table
Pos.	Country	Canada	China	Estonia	Great Britain	Japan	Norway	Slovakia	South Korea	Sweden	Switzerland	United States	Record
4	Canada	—N/a	7–3	9–3	6–3	10–3	7–6	8–9	4–9	3–6	8–4	7–4	7–3
1	China	3–7	—	9–3	6–3	9–2	7–4	7–5	9–4	1–5	7–4	10–2	8–2
10	Estonia	3–9	3–9	—	5–10	6–5	8–3	6–7	2–5	4–6	8–6	6–9	3–7
8	Great Britain	3–6	3–6	10–5	—	8–4	5–7	3–7	6–8	4–6	15–1	10–6	4–6
9	Latvia	3–10	2–9	5–6	4–8	—	6–8	8–4	8–4	9–7	9–7	7–8	4–6
7	Norway	6–7	4–7	3–8	7–5	8–6	—	9–3	4–9	6–8	8–5	5–6	4–6
2	Slovakia	9–8	5–7	7–6	7–3	4–8	3–9	—	7–2	6–5	8–6	9–3	7–3
6	South Korea	9–4	4–9	5–2	8–6	4–8	9–4	2–7	—	10–4	7–8	6–7	5–5
3	Sweden	6–3	5–1	6–4	6–4	7–9	8–6	5–6	4–10	—	9–2	10–7	7–3
11	Switzerland	4–8	4–7	6–8	1–15	7–9	5–8	6–8	8–7	2–9	—	5–8	1–9
5	United States	4–7	2–10	9–6	6–10	8–7	6–5	3–9	7–6	7–10	8–5	—	5–5

Draw 1
Saturday, March 5, 14:35

Sheet D	1	2	3	4	5	6	7	8	Final
Norway (Stordahl)	0	2	2	0	0	1	2	0	7
Great Britain (Nibloe) 🔨	1	0	0	1	2	0	0	1	5

Draw 2
Saturday, March 5, 19:35

Sheet B	1	2	3	4	5	6	7	8	Final
United States (Thums) 🔨	2	1	0	2	0	1	0	0	6
Great Britain (Nibloe)	0	0	3	0	2	0	2	3	10

Draw 6
Monday, March 7, 9:35

Sheet C	1	2	3	4	5	6	7	8	Final
Switzerland (Kneubühl)	0	0	0	0	1	0	X	X	1
Great Britain (Nibloe) 🔨	4	1	5	1	0	4	X	X	15

Draw 8
Monday, March 7, 19:35

Sheet B	1	2	3	4	5	6	7	8	Final
Great Britain (Nibloe)	0	1	0	0	1	0	1	0	3
Slovakia (Ďuriš) 🔨	1	0	2	2	0	1	0	1	7

Draw 9
Tuesday, March 8, 9:35

Sheet C	1	2	3	4	5	6	7	8	Final
Great Britain (Nibloe)	0	3	2	0	4	1	0	X	10
Estonia (Koitmäe) 🔨	1	0	0	3	0	0	1	X	5

Draw 11
Tuesday, March 8, 19:35

Sheet A	1	2	3	4	5	6	7	8	Final
Great Britain (Nibloe)	0	0	0	0	1	1	1	1	4
Sweden (Petersson-Dahl) 🔨	0	3	2	1	0	0	0	0	6

Draw 13
Wednesday, March 9, 14:35

Sheet D	1	2	3	4	5	6	7	8	Final
Canada (Ideson) 🔨	0	0	1	1	0	2	2	X	6
Great Britain (Nibloe)	1	1	0	0	1	0	0	X	3

Draw 14
Wednesday, March 9, 19:35

Sheet A	1	2	3	4	5	6	7	8	Final
South Korea (Jang) 🔨	3	0	2	0	0	2	0	1	8
Great Britain (Nibloe)	0	1	0	2	1	0	2	0	6

Draw 15
Thursday, March 10, 9:35

Sheet B	1	2	3	4	5	6	7	8	Final
China (Wang) 🔨	1	0	1	0	2	1	1	X	6
Great Britain (Nibloe)	0	2	0	1	0	0	0	X	3

Draw 16
Thursday, March 10, 14:35

Sheet C	1	2	3	4	5	6	7	8	Final
Great Britain (Nibloe)	1	3	0	3	1	0	0	X	8
Latvia (Briedis) 🔨	0	0	1	0	0	1	2	X	4

== See also ==
- Great Britain at the Paralympics
- Great Britain at the 2022 Winter Olympics
