= Puerto Rico at the 2022 Winter Paralympics =

- Flag of Puerto Rico
- IPC code: PUR
- NPC: Comite Paralimpico de Puerto Rico

in Beijing, China 4 March 2022 – 13 March 2022
- Competitors: 1 (1 man) in 1 sport
- Medals: Gold 0 Silver 0 Bronze 0 Total 0

Winter Paralympics appearances (overview)
- 2022; 2026

Puerto Rico competed at the 2022 Winter Paralympics in Beijing, China which took place between 4–13 March 2022. It was the first time Puerto Rico competed at the Winter Paralympics. One alpine skier competed.

== Competitors ==
The following is the list of number of competitors participating at the Games per sport/discipline.

Sport	Men	Women	Total
Alpine skiing	1	0	1
Total	1	0	1

== Alpine skiing ==
Orlando Perez competed in alpine skiing.

Athlete	Event	Run 1		Run 2		Total	
Athlete	Event	Time	Rank	Time	Rank	Time	Rank
Orlando Pérez	Men's giant slalom, sitting	DNF		—N/a			
Orlando Pérez	Men's slalom, sitting	DNF		—N/a			

== See also ==
- Puerto Rico at the Paralympics
- Puerto Rico at the 2022 Winter Olympics
