= Wu Zhongwei =

Chinese Paralympic snowboarder (born 1995)

Personal information
- Nationality: Chinese
- Born: 10 December 1995 (age 30)

Sport
- Sport: Snowboarding
- Disability class: SB-LL1
Medal record
Representing China
Men's para snowboarding
Winter Paralympic Games
Gold medal – first place	2022 Beijing	Banked slalom
Gold medal – first place	2026 Milano Cortina	Snowboard cross
Bronze medal – third place	2022 Beijing	Snowboard cross

Wu Zhongwei (born 10 December 1995) is a Chinese para-snowboarder who competes in the SB-LL1 category.

== Career ==
He represented China at the 2022 Winter Paralympics and won a gold medal in the banked slalom and a bronze medal in the snowboard cross event.
