= Australia at the 2022 Winter Paralympics =

- Flag of Australia
- IPC code: AUS
- NPC: Paralympics Australia
- Website: www.paralympic.org.au

in Beijing, China
- Competitors: 9 (on foot) in 2 sports
- Flag bearers (opening): Melissa Perrine; Mitchell Gourley
- Flag bearer (closing): Ben Tudhope
- Medals Ranked 17th: Gold 0 Silver 0 Bronze 1 Total 1

Winter Paralympics appearances (overview)
- 1976; 1980; 1984; 1988; 1992; 1994; 1998; 2002; 2006; 2010; 2014; 2018; 2022; 2026

Australia competed at the 2022 Winter Paralympics in Beijing, China which took place between 4–13 March 2022. A team of ten athletes including two guides was announced on 2 February 2022 with two athletes - Rae Anderson and Josh Hanlon making their Winter Paralympics debut. Jonty O'Callaghan withdrew from the team after a severe training accident on 17 February 2022. Anderson represented Australia in athletics at the 2016 Rio Paralympics. Melissa Perrine and Ben Tudhope were appointed team captains.

== Administration ==
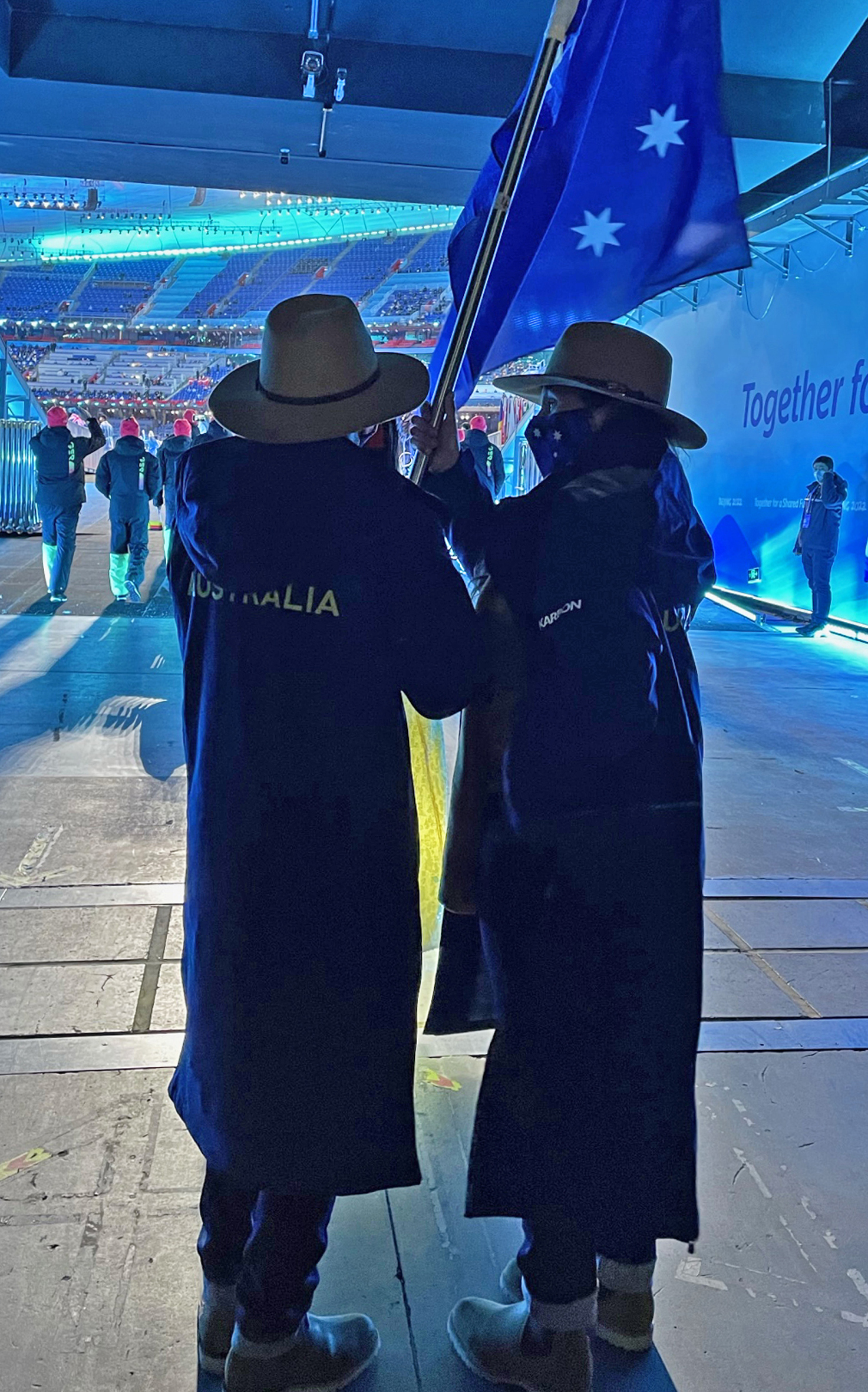
Australian flag bearers - Mitchell Gourley and Melissa Perrine at Opening Ceremony

Kate McLoughlin served as the Chef de Mission. McLoughlin is first woman hold the position for an Australian Winter Paralympics team and was the Chef de Mission for Australian teams at the 2016 and 2020 Summer Paralympics.

Melissa Perrine and Ben Tudhope were appointed team captains. Perrine and Mitchell Gourley carried the flag at the Opening Ceremony. Tudhope was the flag bearer at the Closing Ceremony; he had previously carried the flag at the 2014 Winter Paralympics.

== Team Preparation ==
Team preparation was severely disrupted by COVID restrictions in Australia as there were limited training camps and Western Australian snowboarder Sean Pollard decided to remain home due to the states strict lockdown. Team preparation was managed by Snow Australia and the Australian Institute of Sport invested $5 million over four years.

== Medallists ==
Medal	Name	Sport	Event	Date
Bronze	Ben Tudhope	Snowboarding	Snowboard cross SB-UL	7 March

== Events ==
=== Alpine skiing ===
Women

Athlete	Event	Final				Date
Athlete	Event	Run 1	Run 2	Total Time	Rank	Date
Melissa Perrine / Bobbi Kelly (guide) B2	Slalom Visually Impaired	50.96	DNF			12 March 2022
Melissa Perrine / Bobbi Kelly (guide) B2	Giant slalom visually impaired	1:02.13	1:04.88	2:07.01	6	11 March 2022
Rae Anderson LW9-2	Slalom standing	1:06.50	1:11.05	2:17.55	10	11 March 2022
Rae Anderson LW9-2	Giant slalom standing	1:01.47	59.01	2:00.48	7	12 March 2022

Men

Athlete	Event	Final				Date
Athlete	Event	Run 1	Run 2	Total Time	Rank	Date
Mitchell Gourley LW6/8	Downhill Standing	—N/a		1:22.21	20	5 March 2022
Mitchell Gourley LW6/8	Slalom standing	46.32	DNF	-	-	13 March 2022
Mitchell Gourley LW6/8	Giant slalom standing	59.54	59.54	1:59.27	10	11 March 2022
Mitchell Gourley LW6/8	Super-G standing	—N/a		DNF	-	6 March 2022
Mitchell Gourley LW6/8	Super combined standing	1:16.00	43.26	1:59.26	13	7 March 2022
Josh Hanlon LW12-2	Slalom Sitting	49.80	53.88	1:43.68	6	13 March 2022
Josh Hanlon LW12-2	Giant slalom Sitting	1:06.60	1:03.21	2:09.81	11	11 March 2022
Patrick Jensen B2; Amelia Hodgson (guide)	Downhill Standing Visually Impaired	—N/a		1:23.71	8	5 March 2022
Patrick Jensen B2; Amelia Hodgson (guide)	Super-G Standing Visually Impaired	—N/a		1:16.26	6	6 March 2022
Patrick Jensen B2; Amelia Hodgson (guide)	Super Combined Standing Visually Impaired	1:17.85	DNF	-	-	7 March 2022
Patrick Jensen B2; Amelia Hodgson (guide)	Slalom Standing Visually Impaired	53.22	58.66	1:51.88	8	13 March 2022
Patrick Jensen B2; Amelia Hodgson (guide)	Giant slalom standing Visually Impaired	1:09.98	DNF	-	-	11 March 2022
Sam Tait LW11	Downhill Sitting	—N/a		DNF	-	5 March 2022
Sam Tait LW11	Giant slalom Sitting	1:10.28	1:06.12	2:16.40	22	11 March 2022
Sam Tait LW11	Super-G sitting	—N/a		DNF	-	6 March 2022

=== Snowboarding ===
Men

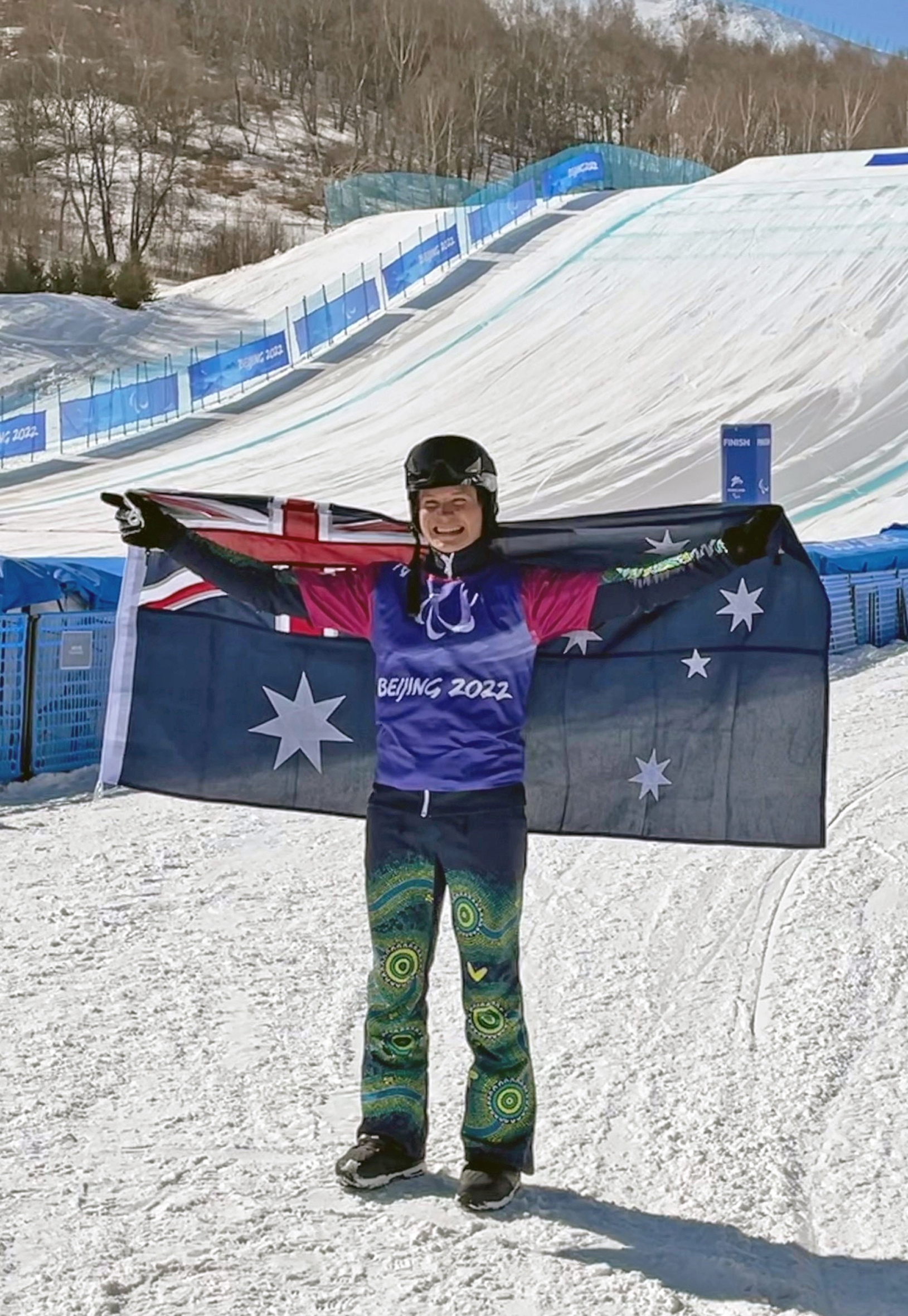
Ben Tudhope holding the Australian flag after winning his bronze medal.

Athlete	Event	Race 1		Race 2		1/8	Q/F	S/F	Final	Date
Athlete	Event	Time	Rank	Time	Rank	Position	Position	Position	Position	
Ben Tudhope; SB-LL2	Men's snowboard cross	1:02.76	3	1:02.77	4 Q	n/a	2	2	3rd place, bronze medalist(s)	7 March 2022

Athlete	Event	Run 1		Run 2		Rank	Date
Athlete	Event	Time	Rank	Time	Rank		
Ben Tudhope; SB-LL2	Men's snowboard banked	1:12.02	10	1:11.64	6	9	11 March 2022

== See also ==
- Australia at the Paralympics
- Australia at the 2022 Winter Olympics
- Paralympics Australian Team Images from 2022 Beijing Winter Paralympics
