= Garrett Geros =

American Paralympic snowboarder (born 1999)

Personal information
- Born: September 3, 1999 (age 26) Cartersville, Georgia, U.S.

Sport
- Sport: Snowboarding
- Disability class: SB-LL2
Medal record
Representing United States
Men's para snowboarding
Winter Paralympic Games
Silver medal – second place	2022 Beijing	Snowboard cross

Garrett Geros (born September 3, 1999) is an American para-snowboarder who has competed in the SB-LL2 category.

== Career ==
Geros represented the United States at the 2022 Winter Paralympics and won a silver medal in the snowboard cross event.
