= Takahito Ichikawa =

Japanese para snowboarder (born 1991)

Personal information
- Born: 18 September 1991 (age 34) Saitama, Japan

Sport
- Sport: Para snowboard
- Disability class: SB-LL2
Medal record
Representing Japan
Men's para snowboarding
World Championships
Silver medal – second place	2021 Lillehammer	Team event

Takahito Ichikawa (市川崇仁, Ichikawa Takahito; born 18 September 1991) is a Japanese para snowboarder. He represented Japan at the 2022 and 2026 Winter Paralympics.

== Career ==
Ichikawa competed at the 2021 World Para Snow Sports Championships and won a silver medal in the team event. He then represented Japan at the 2022 Winter Paralympics and finished in fifth place in the snowboard cross and eighth place in the banked slalom event.

In February 2026, he was selected to represent Japan at the 2026 Winter Paralympics.
