= Ji Lijia =

Chinese Paralympic snowboarder (born 2002)

Personal information
- Born: 25 May 2002 (age 24)

Sport
- Country: China
- Sport: Para snowboard
- Disability class: SB-UL
Medal record
Representing China
Men's para snowboarding
Winter Paralympic Games
Gold medal – first place	2022 Beijing	Snowboard cross
Gold medal – first place	2026 Milano Cortina	Snowboard cross
Silver medal – second place	2022 Beijing	Banked slalom
World Championships
Gold medal – first place	2025 British Columbia	Banked slalom
Gold medal – first place	2025 British Columbia	Snowboard cross

Ji Lijia (born 25 May 2002) is a Chinese para-snowboarder. He represented China at the 2022 and 2026 Winter Paralympics.

== Career ==
He represented China at the 2022 Winter Paralympics and won a gold medal in the snowboard cross and a silver medal in the banked slalom events.

He competed at the 2025 World Para Snowboard Championships and won gold medals in the banked slalom and ski cross events.

== Personal life ==
Ji lost his left forearm in a childhood accident.
