= Santeri Kiiveri =

Finnish para alpine skier (born 2000)

Personal information
- Born: 18 March 2000 (age 26) Lappeenranta, Finland

Sport
- Country: Finland
- Sport: Alpine skiing
- Disability class: LW6/8
Medal record
Representing Finland
Men's para alpine skiing
Paralympic Games
Gold medal – first place	2022 Beijing	Giant slalom standing
Silver medal – second place	2022 Beijing	Super combined standing

Santeri Kiiveri (born 18 March 2000) is a Finnish para alpine skier who competed at the 2018 and 2022 Winter Paralympics.

== Career ==
Kiiveri represented Finland at the 2018 Winter Paralympics where he finished in fourth place in slalom, and sixth place in both the giant slalom and super combined.

He again represented Finland at the 2022 Winter Paralympics and won a gold medal in the giant slalom standing event, and a silver medal in the super combined standing event.
