= Zhu Yonggang =

Chinese Paralympic snowboarder (born 2002)

Personal information
- Nationality: Chinese
- Born: 11 June 2002 (age 24)

Sport
- Sport: Para snowboard
- Disability class: SB-UL
Medal record
Representing China
Men's para snowboarding
Winter Paralympic Games
Silver medal – second place	2026 Milano Cortina	Snowboard cross
Bronze medal – third place	2022 Beijing	Snowboard cross
Bronze medal – third place	2022 Beijing	Banked slalom

Zhu Yonggang (born 11 June 2002) is a Chinese para-snowboarder who competes in the SB-UL category.

== Career ==
He represented China at the 2022 Winter Paralympics and won two bronze medals in the snowboard cross and banked slalom events.
