= Liang Jingyi =

Chinese para alpine skier

Sport
- Country: China
- Sport: Alpine skiing
- Disability class: LW9-1
- Coached by: Leon Svetlin
Medal record
Men's para alpine skiing
Representing China
Paralympic Games
Gold medal – first place	2022 Beijing	Super-G Standing
Silver medal – second place	2022 Beijing	Slalom standing

Liang Jingyi is a Chinese para alpine skier who competed at the 2022 Winter Paralympics.

== Career ==
Jingyi competed at the 2022 Winter Paralympics and won a gold medal in the super-G and a silver medal in the slalom standing events.
