= Aaron Ewen =

New Zealand para-alpine skier (born 1996)

Personal information
- Nationality: New Zealander
- Born: 16 December 1996 (age 29) Amiens, France

Sport
- Country: New Zealand
- Sport: Alpine skiing
- Disability: Spinal cord injuries
- Disability class: LW11

Aaron Ewen (born 16 December 1996) is a New Zealand alpine skier who represented New Zealand at the 2022 Winter Paralympics.

== Biography ==
Born in France to English parents, Ewen moved to New Zealand when he was eight years old, settling in Tuakau. He began sit skiing in 2013 after receiving a spinal injury in a downhill mountain bike accident that left him without the use of his legs.

Ewen was selected for the New Zealand team for the 2018 Winter Paralympics, but had to withdraw after sustaining a hip fracture during training in December 2017. He returned to competition in 2019.
