= Junta Kosuda =

Japanese para snowboarder (born 1990)

Personal information
- Born: 5 October 1990 (age 35) Saitama, Japan

Sport
- Sport: Para snowboard
- Disability class: SB-LL1
Medal record
Representing Japan
Men's para snowboarding
World Championships
Gold medal – first place	2025 Big White	Banked slalom

Junta Kosuda (小須田 潤太, Kosuda Junta; born 5 October 1990) is a Japanese para-athlete and para snowboarder.

== Career ==
Kosuda competed at the 2025 World Para Snowboard Championships and won a gold medal in the banked slalom event.

In January 2026, he was selected to represent Japan at the 2026 Winter Paralympics where he served as the flagbearer during the 2026 Winter Paralympics Parade of Nations. He competed in the snowboard cross event and ranked third during the seeding run.
