= Wang Pengyao =

Chinese para-snowboarder (born 2000)

Personal information
- Born: 2 May 2000 (age 26) Hengshui, China

Sport
- Sport: Para snowboard
- Disability class: SB-UL
Medal record
Representing China
Men's para snowboarding
Winter Paralympic Games
Silver medal – second place	2022 Beijing	Snowboard cross
Silver medal – second place	2026 Milano Cortina	Banked slalom
World Championships
Silver medal – second place	2025 British Columbia	Snowboard cross

Wang Pengyao (born 2 May 2000) is a Chinese para-snowboarder. He represented China at the 2022 Winter Paralympics.

== Career ==
He represented China at the 2022 Winter Paralympics and won a silver medal in the snowboard cross event.

He competed at the 2025 World Para Snowboard Championships and won a silver medal in the snowboard cross event.
