= Judo at the 2020 Summer Paralympics – Women's 48 kg =

Judo – Women's 48 kg at the XVI Paralympic Games
- Venue: Nippon Budokan
- Date: 27 August 2021
- Competitors: 9 from 9 nations

Medalists
1st place, gold medalist(s)		Shahana Hajiyeva	Azerbaijan
2nd place, silver medalist(s)		Sandrine Martinet	France
3rd place, bronze medalist(s)		Viktoriia Potapova	RPC
3rd place, bronze medalist(s)		Yuliia Ivanytska	Ukraine

The women's 48 kg judo competition at the 2020 Summer Paralympics was held on 27 August 2021 at the Nippon Budokan.

== Results ==
=== Bracket ===
Round of 16
Viktoriia Potapova (RPC)	01
Carmen Brussig (GER)	00

Quarterfinals
Sandrine Martinet (FRA)	10
Li Liqing (CHN)	00
Lee Kai-lin (TPE)	00
Yuliia Ivanytska (UKR)	01
Shahana Hajiyeva (AZE)	10
Shizuka Hangai (JPN)	00
Ecem Taşın (TUR)	00
Viktoriia Potapova (RPC)	10

Semifinals
Sandrine Martinet (FRA)	10
Yuliia Ivanytska (UKR)	00
Shahana Hajiyeva (AZE)	10
Viktoriia Potapova (RPC)	00

Final
Sandrine Martinet (FRA)	01
Shahana Hajiyeva (AZE)	10

=== Repechage ===
Repechage 2
Li Liqing (CHN)	00
Lee Kai-lin (TPE)	10

Bronze medal
Lee Kai-lin (TPE)	00
Viktoriia Potapova (RPC)	10

Repechage 1
Carmen Brussig (GER)	01
Ecem Taşın (TUR)	11

Repechage 2
Shizuka Hangai (JPN)	10
Ecem Taşın (TUR)	01

Bronze medal
Shizuka Hangai (JPN)	00
Yuliia Ivanytska (UKR)	11
