= Judo at the 2008 Summer Paralympics – Women's 48 kg =

The women's 48 kg judo competition at the 2008 Summer Paralympics was held on September 7 at the Beijing Workers' Gymnasium. Preliminary rounds started at 12:00 pm CST. Repechage finals, semifinals, bouts for bronze medals, and the final were held at 5:00 pm CST.

This event was the lightest of the women's judo weight classes, limiting competitors to a maximum of 48 kilograms of body mass. Like all other judo events, bouts lasted five minutes. If the bout was still tied at the end, it was extended for another five-minute, sudden-death period; if neither judoka scored during that period, the match is decided by the judges. The tournament bracket consisted of a single-elimination contest culminating in a gold medal match. There was also a repechage to determine the winners of the two bronze medals. Each judoka who had lost to a semifinalist competed in the repechage. The two judokas who lost in the semifinals faced the winner of the opposite half of the bracket's repechage in bronze medal bouts.

== Medalists ==
Gold	Guo Hua Ping; China
Silver	Karla Cardoso; Brazil
Bronze	Victoria Potapova; Russia
Bronze	Carmen Brussig; Germany

== Tournament results ==
First Round
Maria Gonzalez (CUB)	1000
Masami Akatsuka (JPN)	0000

Quarterfinals
Karla Cardoso (BRA)	0200
Yuliya Halinska (UKR)	0000
Maria Gonzalez (CUB)	0002
Karima Medjeded (FRA)	0000
Laura Garcia (ESP)	0000
Guo Hua Ping (CHN)	0200
Carmen Brussig (GER)	0020
Victoria Potapova (RUS)	1000

Semifinals
Karla Cardoso (BRA)	0002^{1}
Maria Gonzalez (CUB)	0001^{1}
Guo Hua Ping (CHN)	0110^{1}
Victoria Potapova (RUS)	0001

Final
Karla Cardoso (BRA)	0000
Guo Hua Ping (CHN)	1010

=== Repechage ===
First round
Yuliya Halinska (UKR)
Bye
Masami Akatsuka (JPN)	0000
Karima Medjeded (FRA)	0200
Laura Garcia (ESP)
Bye
Carmen Brussig (GER)
Bye

Second round
Yuliya Halinska (UKR)	1010
Karima Medjeded (FRA)	0010
Laura Garcia (ESP)	0000
Carmen Brussig (GER)	1000

Bronze medal finals
Yuliya Halinska (UKR)	0010^{1}
Victoria Potapova (RUS)	0201
Carmen Brussig (GER)	1000
Maria Gonzalez (CUB)	0000
