= 2024 in parasports =

This article lists the parasports events for 2024. Main event for 2024 will be 2024 Summer Paralympics.

== Boccia ==
- World Boccia events calendar here.

=== Paralympic Games ===
- August 29 – September 5: 2024 Summer Paralympics in (France) Paris

=== Paralympic Qualifier Tournament ===
- March 22–28: 2024 Paralympic Qualifier Tournament in (Portugal) Coimbra

=== World Boccia Cup ===
- April 29 – May 5: Montreal 2024 World Boccia Cup in (Canada) Montreal
- June 1–7: São Paulo 2024 World Boccia Cup in (Brazil) São Paulo
- July 10–15: Póvoa 2024 World Boccia Cup in (Portugal) Póvoa de Varzim
- July 26–31: New Taipei City 2024 World Boccia Cup in (Chinese Taipei) Taipei

=== World Boccia Challenger ===
- April 7–14: Zagreb 2024 World Boccia Challenger in (Croatia) Zagreb
- May 11–16: Pajulahti 2024 World Boccia Challenger in (Finland) Lahti
- June 24 – July 2: Poznań 2024 World Boccia Challenger in (Poland) Poznań
- July 16–22: Cairo 2024 World Boccia Challenger in (Egypt) Cairo
- September 29 – October 7: Olbia 2024 World Boccia Challenger in (Italy) Olbia
- October 4–15: Cali 2024 World Boccia Challenger in (Colombia) Cali
- November 14–22: Manama 2024 World Boccia Challenger in (Bahrain) Manama

== Goalball ==
- IBSA Goalball tournaments calendar here.

=== Paralympic Games ===
- August 29 – September 5: 2024 Summer Paralympics in (France) Paris

=== Continental Championships ===
- May 30 – June 5: 2024 IBSA Goalball Women's European Championship – Group B in (Italy) Lignano Sabbiadoro
- June 3–11: 2024 IBSA Goalball Men's European Championship – Group B in (Italy) Lignano Sabbiadoro

=== Other tournaments ===
- April 11–14: Men, Women and Youth International Trakai Goalball Tournament in (Lithuania) Trakai
- April 11–14: Goalball Ankara Cup 2024 in (Turkey) Ankara
- April 26–28: Lyon International Women Goalball Tournament in (France) Lyon
- April 26–28: ParaGames Rostock 2024 in (Germany) Rostock
- May 3–5: Roccaraso Goalball Torneo Internazionale in (Italy) Roccaraso
- May 8–13: Desafio Internacional de Goalball 2024 in (Brazil) São Paulo
- May 9–12: International Men Goalball Tournament in (Lithuania) Vilnius
- May 9–12: IX International Lublin Goalball Tournament in (Poland) Lublin
- May 17–19: Blind Games 2024 in (Portugal) Gaia
- May 23–26: Malmö Lady Intercup 2024 in (Sweden) Malmö
- June 3–19: Hangzhou Goalball Training Camp & International Tournament 2024 in (China) Hangzhou
- July 5–10: 3rd Egyptian Pyramids Goalball Championships in (Egypt) Giza
- July 26–31: Goalball International Open Championships Al Ataa Club in (Jordan) Amman
- October 10–13: Dutch Open Goalball Cup 2024 in (Netherlands) Zwolle
- November 28 – December 1: XIII Goalball Tournament Silesia Cup in (Poland) Chorzów

== Ice sledge hockey ==
- Para Ice Hockey Events here

=== World Championships ===
- April 15–20: 2024 World Para Ice Hockey Championships B-Pool in (Norway) Skien
- May 4–12: 2024 World Para Ice Hockey Championships A-Pool in (Canada) Calgary
- November 25–30: 2024 World Para Ice Hockey Championships C-Pool in (Thailand) Bangkok

== Para-alpine skiing ==
- FIS Para-Alpine Skiing Calendar here

=== 2024 FIS Para Alpine Ski World Cup ===
- December 15–17, 2023: WC #1 in (Switzerland) St. Moritz
  - Men's downhill
  - Vision impaired: (Austria) Johannes Aigner (2 times)
  - Standing: (Switzerland) Robin Cuche (2 times)
  - Sitting: (Norway) Jesper Pedersen (1st) / (Netherlands) Jeroen Kampschreur (2nd)
  - Women's downhill
  - Vision impaired: (Slovakia) Alexandra Rexová (1st) / (United Kingdom) Menna Fitzpatrick (2nd)
  - Standing: (France) Marie Bochet (2 times)
  - Sitting: (Germany) Anna-Lena Forster (2 times)
- December 20–22, 2023: WC #2 in (Austria) Steinach am Brenner
  - Men's Super G
  - Vision impaired: (Austria) Johannes Aigner (1st) / (France) Hyacinthe Deleplace (2nd)
  - Standing: (Switzerland) Robin Cuche (1st) / (Canada) Alexis Guimond (2nd)
  - Sitting: (Norway) Jesper Pedersen (2 times)
  - Women's Super G
  - Vision impaired: (United Kingdom) Menna Fitzpatrick (2 times)
  - Standing: (Sweden) Ebba Årsjö (2 times)
  - Sitting: (Germany) Anna-Lena Forster (2 times)
  - Men's Giant slalom
  - Vision impaired: (Italy) Giacomo Bertagnolli
  - Standing: (France) Arthur Bauchet
  - Sitting: (Norway) Jesper Pedersen
  - Women's Giant slalom
  - Vision impaired: (Austria) Veronika Aigner
  - Standing: (Sweden) Ebba Årsjö
  - Sitting: (Germany) Anna-Lena Forster
- January 13–17: WC #3 in (Spain) La Molina
  - Event was cancelled
- January 22–25: WC #4 in (Switzerland) Veysonnaz
  - Men's Giant slalom
  - Vision impaired: (Austria) Johannes Aigner (2 times)
  - Standing: (Switzerland) Robin Cuche (1st) / (France) Arthur Bauchet (2nd)
  - Sitting: (Italy) René De Silvestro (1st) / (Norway) Jesper Pedersen (2nd)
  - Women's Giant slalom
  - Vision impaired: (Austria) Veronika Aigner (2 times)
  - Standing: (Sweden) Ebba Årsjö (2 times)
  - Sitting: (Germany) Anna-Lena Forster (2 times)

  - Men's Slalom
  - Vision impaired: (Italy) Giacomo Bertagnolli
  - Standing: (France) Arthur Bauchet
  - Sitting: (Netherlands) Jeroen Kampschreur
  - Women's Slalom
  - Vision impaired: (Austria) Veronika Aigner
  - Standing: (Sweden) Ebba Årsjö
  - Sitting: (Germany) Anna-Lena Forster
  - Men's Super G
  - Vision impaired: (Italy) Giacomo Bertagnolli
  - Standing: (France) Arthur Bauchet
  - Sitting: (Italy) René De Silvestro
  - Women's Super G
  - Vision impaired: (Slovakia) Alexandra Rexová
  - Standing: (France) Marie Bochet
  - Sitting: (Germany) Anna-Lena Forster

- January 29 – February 2: WC #5 in (Italy) Cortina d'Ampezzo

  - Men's downhill
  - Vision impaired: (Italy) Giacomo Bertagnolli
  - Standing: (Switzerland) Robin Cuche
  - Sitting: (United States) Andrew Kurka
  - Women's downhill
  - Vision impaired: (South Korea) Sara Choi
  - Standing: (France) Aurélie Richard
  - Sitting: (Germany) Anna-Lena Forster
  - Men's Super G
  - Vision impaired: (Austria) Johannes Aigner
  - Standing: (France) Arthur Bauchet
  - Sitting: (Italy) René De Silvestro
  - Women's Super G
  - Vision impaired: (South Korea) Sara Choi
  - Standing: (Sweden) Ebba Årsjö
  - Sitting: (Germany) Anna-Lena Forster

  - Men's Slalom
  - Vision impaired: (Canada) Kalle Ericsson (1st) / (Austria) Johannes Aigner (2nd)
  - Standing: (France) Arthur Bauchet (2 times)
  - Sitting: (France) Lou Braz-Dagand (1st) / (Italy) René De Silvestro (2nd)
  - Women's Slalom
  - Vision impaired: (Austria) Veronika Aigner (2 times)
  - Standing: (Sweden) Ebba Årsjö (2 times)
  - Sitting: (Germany) Anna-Lena Forster (2 times)
- February 10–15: WC #6 in (Japan) Sapporo
- February 27 – March 2: WC #7 in (Austria) Wildschönau
- March 12–15: WC #8 in (Slovenia) Kranjska Gora
- March 18–25: WC #9 in (Italy) Sella Nevea

=== 2024 FIS Para Alpine Ski Europa Cup ===
- December 1, 2023: EC #1 in (Germany) Pitztal (AUT)
  - Event was cancelled
- January 9–10: EC #2 in (Italy) Folgaria
- March 4–10: EC #3 in (Italy) Colere
  - Event was cancelled

=== 2024 FIS Para Alpine Ski Asian Cup ===
- December 7–16, 2023: EC #1 in (China) Wanlong Ski Resort
  - Event was cancelled

=== International FIS Para Competitions ===
- Calendar: here

=== Open National Championships ===
- Calendar: here

=== Entry League FIS Events ===
- Calendar: here

== Para-archery ==
- Full 2024 Archery Calendar here.

=== Paralympic Games ===
- August 30 – September 8: 2024 Summer Paralympics in (France) Paris

=== Paralympic Qualification Tournaments ===
- March 2–7: 2024 Africa–Oceania Qualification Tournament in (United Arab Emirates) Dubai
- March 2–7: 2024 World Qualification Tournament in (United Arab Emirates) Dubai

=== Other Ranking Events ===
- March 2–7: 8th Fazza Para Archery World Ranking Tournament in (United Arab Emirates) Dubai
  - Recurve open winners: (Italy) Stefano Travisani (m) / (Italy) Elisabetta Mijno (w)
  - Compound open winners: (India) Rakesh Kumar (m) / (Turkey) Öznur Cüre (w)
  - W1 (REC/COMP) winners: (Turkey) Yiğit Caner Aydın (m) / (South Korea) Kim Ok-geum (w)
  - Recurve mixed team open winners: Italy
  - Compound mixed team open winners: Turkey
  - Mixed team W1 (REC/COMP) winners: Italy
- April 22–28: 2024 Pan American Para Championships in (Brazil) São Paulo
- April 22–30: Para-Archery World Ranking Event in (Czech Republic) Nové Město nad Metují

== Para-athletics ==
- Full Para-athletics events calendar here.
- 2024 World Para Athletics Grand Prix Calendar here.

=== Paralympic Games ===
- August 30 – September 8: 2024 Summer Paralympics in (France) Paris

=== World Championships ===
- May 17–25: 2024 World Para Athletics Championships in (Japan) Kobe

=== 2024 World Para Athletics Grand Prix ===
- February 12–15: Dubai 2024 Grand Prix in (United Arab Emirates) Dubai
- March 5–7: Tunis 2024 Grand Prix in (Tunisia) Tunis
- March 22–24: Jesolo 2024 Grand Prix in (Italy) Jesolo
- April 5–7: Xalapa 2024 Grand Prix in (Mexico) Xalapa
- April 26–28: Marrakech 2024 Grand Prix in (Morocco) Marrakesh
- June 6–8: Nottwil 2024 Grand Prix in (Switzerland) Nottwil
- June 13–14: Paris 2024 Grand Prix in (France) Paris

== Para-badminton ==
- 2024 Para Badminton Tournaments calendar here.

=== Paralympic Games ===
- August 29 – September 2: 2024 Summer Paralympics in (France) Paris

=== International Championships ===
- January 28–30: 2024 West Asia Para Games in (United Arab Emirates) Sharjah
- February 20–25: 2024 BWF Para-Badminton World Championships in (Thailand) Pattaya

=== BWF Para Badminton World Circuit ===
- January 23–28: Egypt Para Badminton International in Cairo
- April 15–21: Spanish Para Badminton International - II in (Spain) Vitoria-Gasteiz
- April 23–27: Spanish Para Badminton International - I in (Spain) Toledo
- May 21–26: Bahrain Para Badminton International in Manama
- June 18–23: 4 Nations Para Badminton International in (Scotland) Glasgow
- July 2–7: Uganda Para Badminton International in Kampala
- September 17–22: Indonesia Para Badminton International in Surakarta
- October 22–27: Japan Para Badminton International in Tokyo
- November 12–17: Malaysia Para Badminton International in Kuala Lumpur Event cancelled

== Para biathlon ==
- FIS Para Biathlon Calendar here

=== World Championships ===
- March 5–10: World Championships #1 in (Canada) Prince George
  - Men's 7.5 km sprint: (China) Liu Zixu (sitting) / (Canada) Mark Arendz (standing) / (Ukraine) Oleksandr Kazik (vision impaired)
  - Women's 7.5 km sprint: (United States) Oksana Masters (sitting) / (Ukraine) Liudmyla Liashenko & (Canada) Natalie Wilkie (standing) / (Germany) Linn Kazmaier (vision impaired)
  - Men's 12.5 km individual start: (Ukraine) Taras Rad (sitting) / (Canada) Mark Arendz (standing) / (France) Anthony Chalençon (vision impaired)
  - Women's 12.5 km individual start: (United States) Kendall Gretsch (sitting) / (Ukraine) Liudmyla Liashenko (standing) / (Germany) Linn Kazmaier (vision impaired)
  - Men's sprint pursuit: (Ukraine) Taras Rad (sitting) / (Canada) Mark Arendz (standing) / (Ukraine) Oleksandr Kazik (vision impaired)
  - Women's sprint pursuit: (United States) Kendall Gretsch (sitting) / (Ukraine) Bohdana Konashuk (standing) / (Germany) Linn Kazmaier (vision impaired)
  - Mixed team sprint: (United States) Kendall Gretsch & (United States) Oksana Masters (sitting) / (Ukraine) Bohdana Konashuk & (Ukraine) Liudmyla Liashenko (standing/vision impaired)

=== 2023–24 FIS Para Biathlon World Cup ===
- January 20–21: WC #1 in (Slovenia) Pokljuka
  - Event was cancelled
- January 31 – February 4: WC #2 in (Italy) Martell
  - Men's 7.5 km sprint: (Ukraine) Taras Rad (sitting) / (Canada) Mark Arendz (standing) / (Ukraine) Oleksandr Kazik (vision impaired)
  - Women's 7.5 km sprint: (United States) Oksana Masters (sitting) / (Ukraine) Oleksandra Kononova (standing) / (Germany) Linn Kazmaier (vision impaired)
  - Men's 10 km individual start: (Ukraine) Vasyl Kravchuk (sitting) / (Canada) Mark Arendz (standing) / (Ukraine) Oleksandr Kazik (vision impaired)
  - Women's 10 km individual start: (United States) Kendall Gretsch (sitting) / (Canada) Brittany Hudak (standing) / (Germany) Linn Kazmaier (vision impaired)
  - Men's sprint pursuit: (Ukraine) Taras Rad (sitting) / (Canada) Mark Arendz (standing) / (Ukraine) Oleksandr Kazik (vision impaired)
  - Women's sprint pursuit: (United States) Kendall Gretsch (sitting) / (Ukraine) Liudmyla Liashenko (standing) / (Germany) Linn Kazmaier (vision impaired)
- March 13–17: WC #3 in (Canada) Prince George
  - Men's 10 km individual start: (Ukraine) Taras Rad (sitting) / (Canada) Mark Arendz (standing) / (Ukraine) Oleksandr Kazik (vision impaired)
  - Women's 10 km individual start: (Germany) Anja Wicker (sitting) / (Ukraine) Liudmyla Liashenko (standing) / (Germany) Linn Kazmaier (vision impaired)

=== 2023–24 FIS Para Biathlon Continental Cup ===
- November 25–26, 2023: CC in (Canada) Canmore

== Para-cycling ==
- UCI calendar here.

=== Paralympic Games ===
- August 29 – September 7: 2024 Summer Paralympics in (France) Paris

=== World Championships ===
- March 20–24: 2024 UCI Para-cycling Track World Championships in (Brazil) Rio de Janeiro
- September 21–29: 2024 UCI Para-cycling Road World Championships in (Switzerland) Zurich

=== Continental Championships ===
- February 14–18: Oceania Para Track Championships in (New Zealand) Cambridge
- February 21–26: 12th Asian Para Track Cycling Championships in (India) New Delhi
- April 12–13: Oceania Para Road Championships in (Australia) Brisbane
- June 4–7: Campeonato Parapanamericano de Pista in (Colombia) Cali
- June 5–12: 12th Asian Para Cycling Road Championships in (Kazakhstan) Almaty
- June 9–10: Campeonato Parapanamericano de Ruta in (Colombia) Cali

=== 2024 UCI Para-cycling Road World Cup ===
- January 13–17: World Cup in (Australia) Adelaide
- May 2–5: World Cup in (Belgium) Ostend
- May 16–19: World Cup in (Italy) Maniago

=== National Championships ===
- January 4–7: 2024 Australian Elite Road Championship in (Australia) Ballarat
  - Results: here
- January 18–21: Brazilian Track Paracycling Championship 2024 in (Brazil) Indaiatuba
  - Results: here
- January 25–26: Championnats Suisse in (Switzerland) Grenchen
  - Results: here
- February 23–25: National Paracycling Track Championships in (United Kingdom) Manchester
  - Results: here
- February 23–25: Campeonato de España Pista Paralimpico in (Spain) Galapagar
  - Results: here
- February 24: Championnat de France de paracyclisme sur piste in Roubaix
  - Results: here
- March 1–2: Venezuela Campeonato Nacional de Pista Paraciclismo in Caracas
  - Results: here
- March 2–7: Track National Championships in New Zealand
  - Results: here
- March 29–31: 2024 Canadian Track Championships (Jr/U17//Para) in (Canada) Bromont
  - Results: here
- April 19–21: Age Group Road National Championships in (New Zealand) Cambridge
  - Results: here
- May 24–26: Campeonato de España de Ciclismo Paralímpico 2024 en Ruta in (Spain) Caravaca de la Cruz
  - Results: here

=== Other Events ===
- January 6: Belgian Paracycling track event in (Belgium) Heusden-Zolder
  - Results: here
- February 10–11: U.S. Paralympics Track Cycling Open in (United States) Carson
  - Results: here
- March 2–3: Extremadura European Paracycling Cup in (Spain) Cáceres
  - Results: here
- April 6–7: 10° Due giorni del mare 2024 (Road) in (Italy) Massa
  - Results: here
- April 12–14: Para-Cycling Road Brazilian Cup - Estage 1 in (Brazil) Natal
  - Results: here
- April 13–14: Handi Gard Classic in (France) Méjannes-le-Clap
  - Results: here
- April 25–28: XXVII HETMAN Tandem Race Cup in (Poland) Lublin
  - Results: here

== Para-equestrian ==
- Full 2024 FEI Calendar here.

=== Paralympic Games ===
- August 30 – September 8: 2024 Summer Paralympics in (France) Paris

== Paracanoe ==
- ICF Events calendar here.

=== Paralympic Games ===
- September 6–8: 2024 Summer Paralympics in (France) Paris

=== World & Continental Championships ===
- April 18–21: 2024 ACC Paracanoe Asian Championships in (Japan) Tokyo
- May 9–11: 2024 ICF Paracanoe World Championships in (Hungary) Szeged
- June 13–16: 2024 ECA Paracanoe European Championships in (Hungary) Szeged

=== Other Events ===
- April 6–7: International Race Milan in (Italy) Milan

== Paraclimbing ==
=== Continental Championships ===
- August 24–25: IFSC Paraclimbing European Championships in (Switzerland) Villars-sur-Ollon

=== World Cup ===
- May 7–8: PWC #1 in (United States) Salt Lake City
- June 24–25: PWC #2 in (Austria) Innsbruck
- September 27–28: PWC #2 in (Italy) Arco

== Para judo ==
- IBSA Judo website here.

=== Paralympic Games ===
- September 5–7: 2024 Summer Paralympics in (France) Paris

=== 2024 IBSA Judo Grand Prix ===
- February 14–19: IBSA Judo Grand Prix in (Germany) Heidelberg

  - Men's 60 kg J1: (Iran) Sayed Abadi
  - Men's 60 kg J2: (Ukraine) Davyd Khorava
  - Men's 73 kg J1: (Germany) Lennart Sass
  - Men's 73 kg J2: (Japan) Yujiru Seto
  - Men's 90 kg J1: (Brazil) Arthur da Silva
  - Men's 90 kg J2: (Uzbekistan) Davurkhon Karomatov
  - Men's 90+kg J1: (Brazil) Wilians de Araújo
  - Men's 90+kg J2: (Iran) Vahid Nouri
  - Women's 48 kg J1: (Ukraine) Nataliya Nikolaychyk
  - Women's 48 kg J2: (Kazakhstan) Akmaral Nauatbek
  - Women's 57 kg J1: (Uzbekistan) Uljon Amrieva
  - Women's 57 kg J2: (China) Wang Jianan
  - Women's 70 kg J1: (China) Li Liu
  - Women's 70 kg J2: (China) Wang Yue
  - Women's 70 kg+ J1: (Ukraine) Anastasiia Harnyk
  - Women's 70 kg+ J2: (Kazakhstan) Zerina Raifova

- April 1–3: IBSA Judo Grand Prix in (Turkey) Antalya

  - Men's 60 kg J1: (India) Kapil Parmar
  - Men's 60 kg J2: (Uzbekistan) Sherzod Namozov
  - Men's 73 kg J1: (Romania) Alex Bologa
  - Men's 73 kg J2: (Uzbekistan) Uchkun Kuranbaev
  - Men's 90 kg J1: (Moldova) Oleg Crețul
  - Men's 90 kg J2: (Uzbekistan) Davurkhon Karomatov
  - Men's 90+kg J1: (Brazil) Wilians de Araújo
  - Men's 90+kg J2: (Kazakhstan) Zhurkamyrza Shukurbekov
  - Women's 48 kg J1: (Turkey) Ecem Taşın
  - Women's 48 kg J2: (China) Li Liqing
  - Women's 57 kg J1: (China) Shi Yijie
  - Women's 57 kg J2: (Japan) Junko Hirose
  - Women's 70 kg J1: (China) Li Liu
  - Women's 70 kg J2: (China) Wang Yue
  - Women's 70 kg+ J1: (Brazil) Erika Zoaga
  - Women's 70 kg+ J2: (Cuba) Sheyla Hernández Estupiñán

- May 18–19: IBSA Judo Grand Prix in (Georgia (country)) Tbilisi

  - Men's 60 kg J1: (India) Kapil Parmar
  - Men's 60 kg J2: (Uzbekistan) Kemran Nurillaev
  - Men's 73 kg J1: (Romania) Alex Bologa
  - Men's 73 kg J2: (Japan) Yujiru Seto
  - Men's 90 kg J1: (Brazil) Arthur da Silva
  - Men's 90 kg J2: (France) Hélios Latchoumanaya
  - Men's 90+kg J1: (Moldova) Ion Basoc
  - Men's 90+kg J2: (Georgia (country)) Revaz Chikoidze
  - Women's 48 kg J1: (Ukraine) Nataliya Nikolaychyk
  - Women's 48 kg J2: (China) Li Liqing
  - Women's 57 kg J1: (China) Shi Yijie
  - Women's 57 kg J2: (Kazakhstan) Dayana Fedossova
  - Women's 70 kg J1: (China) Li Liu
  - Women's 70 kg J2: (China) Wang Yue
  - Women's 70 kg+ J1: (Ukraine) Anastasiia Harnyk
  - Women's 70 kg+ J2: (Kazakhstan) Aidana Gazizkyzy

== Para swimming ==
- Full Para Swimming Events Calendar here.
- 2024 Citi Para Swimming World Series Calendar here.

=== Paralympic Games ===
- August 29 – September 7: 2024 Summer Paralympics in (France) Paris

=== Continental Championships ===
- April 21–27: 2024 World Para Swimming European Open Championships in (Portugal) Funchal

=== 2024 Citi Para Swimming World Series ===
- February 1–4: Citi Para Swimming World Series Great Britain in (United Kingdom) Aberdeen
  - Results here.
- February 23–25: Citi Para Swimming World Series Australia in Melbourne
  - Results here.
- March 14–17: Citi Para Swimming World Series Lignano Sabbiadoro in (Italy) Lignano Sabbiadoro
  - Results here.
- April 11–13: Citi Para Swimming World Series USA in (United States) Indianapolis
- May 17–19: Citi Para Swimming World Series Singapore in Singapore
- May 30 – June 2: Citi Para Swimming World Series Berlin in (Germany) Berlin
- June 7–9: Citi Para Swimming World Series France in Paris
- November 21–24: Citi Para Swimming World Series Mexico in Guadalajara
- December 6–8: Citi Para Swimming World Series Egypt in Cairo

== Para table tennis ==
- 2024 Para Table Tennis Calendar here.

=== Paralympic Games ===
- August 29 – September 7: 2024 Summer Paralympics in (France) Paris

=== 2024 Para Table Tennis Tour ===
- January 16–18: ITTF Fa20 US Para Open 2024 in (United States) Corpus Christi
- January 20–22: ITTF Fa20 Bahrain Para Open 2024 in Manama Event cancelled
- January 24–27: ITTF Fa40 Egypt Para Open 2024 in Giza
- February 1–4: ITTF Fa40 Brazilian Para Open 2024 in (Brazil) São Paulo
- March 1–3: ITTF Fa20 Astana Para Open 2024 in (Kazakhstan) Astana
- March 6–9: ITTF Fa20 Lignano Masters Para Open 2024 in (Italy) Lignano Sabbiadoro
- March 11–14: ITTF Fa20 Costa Brava Spanish Para Open 2024 in (Spain) Platja d'Aro
- March 26–29: ITTF Fa20 Polish Para Open 2024 in (Poland) Władysławowo
- April 20–22: ITTF Fa20 Al-Watani Para Championships 2024 in (Jordan) Amman
- April 26–28: ITTF Fa20 Kuwait Para Open 2024 in Kuwait Event cancelled
- May 1–4: ITTF Fa20 Montenegro Para Championships 2024 in Podgorica
- May 7–11: 19th I feel Slovenia Open Thermana Laško in Laško
- May 23–25: Paralympic World Qualification Tournament 2024 in (Thailand) Pattaya
- May 29 – June 1: ITTF Fa20 Taipei City Para Open 2024 in (Chinese Taipei) Taipei City
- June 9–11: ITTF Fa20 Mexico Para Open 2024 in Cancun
- June 20–22: ITTF Fa20 Czech Para Open 2024 in (Czech Republic) Ostrava
- July 21–24: ITTF Fa40 Thailand Para Open 2024 in Pattaya
- October 6–8: ITTF Fa20 Brazilian Para Open 2024 in (Brazil) São Paulo
- October 11–13: ITTF Fa20 Copa Tango 2024 in (Argentina) Buenos Aires
- October 15–17: ITTF Fa20 Chile Para Open 2024 in Santiago Event cancelled
- October 28–30: ITTF Fa20 SQY French Para Open 2024 in (France) Saint-Quentin-en-Yvelines
- November 1–3: ITTF Fa20 Saudi Para Open 2024 in (Saudi Arabia) Riyadh Event cancelled
- November 7–9: ITTF Fa20 Value Jet Lagos Para Open 2024 in (Nigeria) Lagos

== Para taekwondo ==
- 2024 World Para Taekwondo Event Calendar here.

=== Paralympic Games ===
- August 29–31: 2024 Summer Paralympics in (France) Paris

=== Continental Championships ===
- May 3: Pan American Para Taekwondo Championships in (Brazil) Rio de Janeiro
- March 9–11: Europe Para Taekwondo Championships in (Serbia) Belgrade
- May 19: 9th Asian Para Taekwondo Championships in (Vietnam) Da Nang

=== Paralympic Qualification Tournaments ===
- February 9: African Qualification Tournament in (Senegal) Dakar
- March 8: European Qualification Tournament in (Bulgaria) Sofia
- March 17: Asian Qualification Tournament in (China) Tai'an
- April 6: Oceania Qualification Tournament in (Solomon Islands) Honiara
- April 11: Pan American Qualification Tournament in (Dominican Republic) Santo Domingo

=== Other WPT Events ===
- February 20: WT President's Cup Asia Region - Para Taekwondo in (Iran) Teheran
- May 5: Rio Open Para Taekwondo in (Brazil) Rio de Janeiro
- July 5: 2024 World Para Taekwondo Open Challenge in (South Korea) Chuncheon
- September 19: WT President's Cup Oceania - Para Taekwondo in (Australia) Brisbane
- September 20: WT President's Cup Oceania - Para Taekwondo Poomsae in (Australia) Brisbane
- September 21: Australia Open - Para Taekwondo Kyorugi in Brisbane
- September 22: Australia Open - Para Taekwondo Poomsae in Brisbane
- December: 2024 World Para Taekwondo Grand Prix Final in TBD

== Paralympic cross-country skiing ==
- FIS Para Cross-Country Calendar here

=== 2023–24 FIS Para Cross-Country World Cup ===
- January 17–18: WC #1 in (Slovenia) Pokljuka
  - Event was cancelled
- January 24–28: WC #2 in (Italy) Toblach
  - Men's 10 km interval start C: (Italy) Giuseppe Romele (sitting) / (Canada) Mark Arendz (standing) / (United States) Jake Adicoff (vision impaired)
  - Women's 10 km interval start C: (United States) Oksana Masters (sitting) / (Norway) Vilde Nilsen (standing) / (Germany) Linn Kazmaier (vision impaired)
  - Men's 10 km mass start C: (Italy) Giuseppe Romele (sitting) / (Japan) Taiki Kawayoke (standing) / (United States) Jake Adicoff (vision impaired)
  - Women's 10 km mass start C: (United States) Oksana Masters (sitting) / (Norway) Vilde Nilsen (standing) / (Germany) Linn Kazmaier (vision impaired)
  - Men's 1 km sprint F: (Brazil) Cristian Ribera (sitting) / (Ukraine) Serhii Romaniuk (standing) / (Germany) Nico Messinger (vision impaired)
  - Women's 1 km sprint F: (United States) Oksana Masters (sitting) / (Norway) Vilde Nilsen (standing) / (Germany) Linn Kazmaier (vision impaired)
  - Men's 5/10 km interval start F: (Italy) Giuseppe Romele (sitting) / (Germany) Marco Maier (standing) / (United States) Jake Adicoff (vision impaired)
  - Women's 5/10 km interval start F: (United States) Oksana Masters (sitting) / (Norway) Vilde Nilsen (standing) / (Czech Republic) Simona Bubeníčková (vision impaired)
- January 31 – February 1: WC #3 in (Italy) Martell
  - Men's sprint C: (Ukraine) Pavlo Bal (sitting) / (Japan) Taiki Kawayoke (standing) / (United States) Jake Adicoff (vision impaired)
  - Women's sprint C: (United States) Oksana Masters (sitting) / (Norway) Vilde Nilsen (standing) / (Austria) Carina Edlinger (vision impaired)
- March 13–17: WC #4 in (Canada) Prince George
  - Men's 5 km interval start C: (Canada) Derek Zaplotinsky (sitting) / (Japan) Taiki Kawayoke (standing) / (Sweden) Zebastian Modin (vision impaired)
  - Women's 5 km interval start C: (Germany) Anja Wicker (sitting) / (Norway) Vilde Nilsen (standing) / (Germany) Leonie Maria Walter (vision impaired)
  - Men's sprint F: (Canada) Collin Cameron (sitting) / (Ukraine) Serafym Drahun (standing) / (United States) Jake Adicoff (vision impaired)
  - Women's sprint F: (Germany) Anja Wicker (sitting) / (Norway) Vilde Nilsen (standing) / (Germany) Linn Kazmaier (vision impaired)
  - Men's 20 km mass start C: (Italy) Giuseppe Romele (sitting) / (Japan) Taiki Kawayoke (standing) / (United States) Jake Adicoff (vision impaired)
  - Women's 20 km mass start C: (Germany) Anja Wicker (sitting) / (Norway) Vilde Nilsen (standing) / (Germany) Linn Kazmaier (vision impaired)

=== 2023–24 FIS Para Cross-Country Continental Cup ===
- August 14–18, 2023: CC #1 in (Argentina) Tierra Mayor
  - Event was cancelled
- October 25–28, 2023: CC #2 in (Germany) Oberhof
- November 29 – December 3, 2023: CC #3 in (Norway) Gålå
- December 15–22, 2023: CC #4 in (China) Zhangjiakou
  - Event was cancelled
- January 2–5: CC #5 in (United States) Soldier Hollow
- February 23–24: CC #6 in (United States) Bozeman

=== International FIS Para Competitions ===
- Calendar here

=== Open National Championships ===
- Calendar here

== Paralympic football ==
- Blind Football Competitions Calendar here.
- 2024 IFCPF World Competitions Calendar here.

=== Blind Football ===
==== Paralympic Games ====
- August 28 - September 8: 2024 Summer Paralympics in (France) Paris

==== Other Competitions ====
- April 1-7: International Blind Football Men and Women Antalya Cup in (Turkey) Antalya
- May 3-5: VIII Football International Championships in (Spain) Seville
- May 24 - June 2: 2024 IBSA Men's Blind Football World Grand Prix in (France) Schiltigheim
- September 27-29: 11th Cup of Central European Cities 2024 in (Czech Republic) Prague
- October 17-26: 2024 IBSA Women's Blind Football World Grand Prix in (Argentina) Cordoba

=== CP Football ===
==== World Competitions ====
- April/November: 2024 IFCPF World Championships in (Spain) Salou
- July: 2024 IFCPF World Cup in (Spain) Madrid

== Paralympic powerlifting ==
- World Para Powerlifting 2023 & 2024 Competition Calendar here.

=== Paralympic Games ===
- September 4–8: 2024 Summer Paralympics in (France) Paris

=== 2024 World Para Powerlifting World Cup ===
- February 29 – March 6: World Cup in (United Arab Emirates) Dubai

  - Men's 49 kg: (Turkey) Abdullah Kayapınar
  - Men's 54 kg: (China) Yang Jinglang
  - Men's 59 kg: (Iran) Mohsen Bakhtiar
  - Men's 65 kg: (China) Zou Yi
  - Men's 72 kg: (Malaysia) Bonnie Bunyau Gustin
  - Men's 80 kg: (Iraq) Rasool Mohsin
  - Men's 88 kg: (China) Yan Panpan
  - Men's 97 kg: (China) Ye Jixiong
  - Men's 107 kg: (Iran) Aliakbar Gharibshahi
  - Men's 107 kg+: (Iran) Ahmad Aminzadeh
  - Women's 41 kg: (China) Cui Zhe
  - Women's 45 kg: (China) Guo Lingling
  - Women's 50 kg: (China) Wei Yi
  - Women's 55 kg: (China) Xiao Jinping
  - Women's 61 kg: (China) Cui Jianjin
  - Women's 67 kg: (China) Tan Yujiao
  - Women's 73 kg: (China) Liao Liye
  - Women's 79 kg: (China) Han Miaoyu
  - Women's 86 kg: (Brazil) Tayana Medeiros
  - Women's 86 kg+: (China) Zheng Feifei

- March 20–24: World Cup in (Egypt) Sharm El Sheikh

  - Men's 49 kg: (Jordan) Omar Qarada
  - Men's 54 kg: (Nigeria) Roland Ezuruike
  - Men's 59 kg: (Iraq) Mustafa Radhi
  - Men's 65 kg: (Nigeria) Thomas Kure
  - Men's 72 kg: (Panama) Rey Melchor Dimas Vasquez
  - Men's 80 kg: (Iraq) Rasool Mohsin
  - Men's 88 kg: (Egypt) Mohamed Elelfat
  - Men's 97 kg: (Jordan) Mohammad Ahmad Khattab
  - Men's 107 kg: (Jordan) Mutaz Zakaria Daoud Aljuneidi
  - Men's 107 kg+: (Georgia (country)) Akaki Jintcharadze
  - Women's 41 kg: (Nigeria) Esther Nworgu
  - Women's 45 kg: (Turkey) Nazmiye Muratlı
  - Women's 50 kg: (Nigeria) Bose Bejide
  - Women's 55 kg: (Egypt) Rehab Ahmed
  - Women's 61 kg: (Nigeria) Onyinyechi Mark
  - Women's 67 kg: (Egypt) Fatma Elyan
  - Women's 73 kg: (Egypt) Safaa Hassan
  - Women's 79 kg: (Nigeria) Bose Omolayo
  - Women's 86 kg: (Egypt) Randa Mahmoud
  - Women's 86 kg+: (Nigeria) Folashade Oluwafemiayo

- May 7–10: World Cup in (Thailand) Pattaya
- May 23–26: World Cup in Mexico
- June 20–26: World Cup in (Georgia (country)) Tbilisi
- December: World Cup in Europe

=== Other Events ===
- January 26–28: West Asian Para Games in (United Arab Emirates) Sharjah
- February 3: AUS 2024 National Competition - Gold Coast Classic in (Australia) Gold Coast
- February 4–6: I.R.I Invitational Para Powerlifting Competition in (Iran) Tehran

== Paralympic shooting ==
- 2024 World Shooting Para Sport competition calendar here.

=== Paralympic Games ===
- August 30 – September 5: 2024 Summer Paralympics in (France) Paris

=== World & Continental Championships ===
- May 30 – June 7: 2024 WSPS European Championships (rifle & pistol) in (Spain) Granada
- May 30 – June 7: 2024 WSPS World Shotgun Championships in (Spain) Granada

=== 2024 WSPS World Cup ===
- March 6–15: WSPS World Cup (rifle & pistol) in (India) New Delhi
- April 25 – May 1: WSPS World Cup (rifle & pistol) in (South Korea) Changwon

=== 2024 Grand Prix ===
- November 2023 – February: 9th Home Range Cup At your Home Range
- May 9–11: 1st International Germany Cup for VI in Langelsheim
- May 24–26: Green Cup 2024 WSPS Grand Prix in (Italy) Massa Martana
- June 21–23: Emir Cup 2024 WSPS Grand Prix in (Italy) Massa Martana
- June 23–30: Hillsdale College 2024 WSPS Grand Prix in (United States) Hillsdale
- June 30 – July 6: Novi Sad 2024 WSPS Grand Prix in (Serbia) Novi Sad
- July 8–13: 3rd Open WSPS Grand Prix "Club Internacional Arequipa" in (Peru) Arequipa
- July 30 – August 6: 5th International Sellier & Bellot Para Trap Championship & WSPS Grand Prix in (Czech Republic) Brno
- November – February 2025: 10th Home Range Cup At your Home Range

== Paratriathlon ==
- 2024 Paratriathlon Calendar here.

=== 2024 World & Olympic Paratriathlon Championships ===
- September 1 & 2: 2024 Summer Paralympics in (France) Paris
- October 17-20: World Triathlon Para Championships in (Spain) Torremolinos

=== 2024 World Triathlon Para Series ===
- March 15: WTPS #1 in (Australia) Devonport
- May 11: WTPS #2 in (Japan) Yokohama
- June 22: WTPS #3 in (United Kingdom) Swansea
- June 29: WTPS #4 in (Canada) Montreal

=== 2024 World Triathlon Para Cup ===
- March 8: WTPC in (United Arab Emirates) Abu Dhabi
  - Event was cancelled
- April 21: WTPC #1 in (Turkey) Yenişehir
- May 18: WTPC #2 in (Uzbekistan) Samarkand
- June 1: WTPC #3 in (Spain) Vigo
- June 8: WTPC #4 in (Italy) Taranto
- June 15: WTPC #5 in (France) Besançon
- July 13: WTPC #6 in (Hungary) Tata
- July 20 & 21: WTPC in (United States) Long Beach
  - Event was cancelled
- October 12 & 13: WTPC #7 in (Portugal) Alhandra

=== Continental Paratriathlon Championships ===
- February 4: Oceania Paratriathlon Championships in (Australia) Stockton
- March 8: Americas Paratriathlon Championships in (United States) Miami
- April 20: Africa Paratriathlon Championships in (Egypt) Hurghada
- May 5: Europe Triathlon Powerman Middle Distance Duathlon Championships in (Germany) Alsdorf
- June 2: Asia Paratriathlon Championships in (Philippines) Subic Bay
- June 14-22: Europe Triathlon Multisport Championships in (Portugal) Coimbra
- September 21 & 22: Europe Triathlon Championships in (France) Vichy

=== World Triathlon Continental Para Cups ===
- February 24: African Triathlon Para Cup in (Egypt) Sharm El Sheikh
- May 3 & 4: African Triathlon Para Cup in (Tunisia) Hammamet
- August 3: Americas Triathlon Para Cup in (Colombia) Riohacha
- September 8: Americas Triathlon Para Cup in (Colombia) Santa Marta
- September 22: Asia Triathlon Para Cup in (Japan) Tokyo
- October 13: Europe Triathlon Para Cup in (Portugal) Alhandra
- October 19 & 20: Asia Triathlon Para Cup in (Japan) Chiba

== Pararowing ==
- World Rowing calendar here.

=== Paralympic Games ===
- August 30 – September 1: 2024 Summer Paralympics in (France) Paris

=== Paralympic Qualification Regattas ===
- March 14–17: Americas Continental Qualification Regatta in (Brazil) Rio de Janeiro
- April 19–21: Asia/Oceania Continental Qualification Regatta in (South Korea) Chungju
- April 25–28: Europe Continental Qualification Regatta in (Hungary) Szeged
- May 19–21: Final Paralympic Qualification Regatta in (Switzerland) Lucerne

=== Other Regattas ===
- February 10–11: Torino International Winter Regatta in (Italy) Turin
  - Results: Day 1, Day 2
- March 18–20: 2024 South American Rowing Championships in (Brazil) Rio de Janeiro
- March 31: 2024 International Rowing Regatta Boulonnais in (France) Boulogne
- April 13–14: Ghent International Sprint Regatta in (Belgium) Ghent
- May 11: 2024 Wienerachter in (Austria) Vienna
- June 1–2: 2024 Koninklijke – Holland Becker in (Netherlands) Amsterdam
- June 28–30: 2024 62nd Amber Oars International Regatta in (Lithuania) Trakai
- June 28–30: 2024 120th Vienna International Rowing Regatta in (Austria) Vienna
- August 10–11: 2024 Open Lithuanian U17 and Senior Championships in (Lithuania) Trakai

== Para-snowboarding ==
- FIS Para-Snowboard Calendar here

=== 2023–24 FIS Para-Snowboard World Cup ===
- November 29 – December 1, 2023: WC #1 in (Netherlands) Landgraaf
  - Men's Banked Slalom SB-UL: (Switzerland) Aron Fahrni (1st) / (Italy) Jacopo Luchini (2nd)
  - Men's Banked Slalom SB-LL1: (United States) Noah Elliott (2 times)
  - Men's Banked Slalom SB-LL2: (Italy) Emanuel Perathoner (2 times)
  - Women's Banked Slalom SB-UL: (Poland) Monika Kotzian (2 times)
  - Women's Banked Slalom SB-LL1/SB-LL2: (Netherlands) Lisa Bunschoten (2 times)
- February 5–7: WC #2 in (Finland) Pyhä
  - Men's Snowboard Cross SB-UL: (Italy) Jacopo Luchini (1st) / (Switzerland) Aron Fahrni (2nd)
  - Men's Snowboard Cross SB-LL1: (Canada) Tyler Turner (2 times)
  - Men's Snowboard Cross SB-LL2: (Italy) Emanuel Perathoner (2 times)
  - Women's Snowboard Cross SB-UL: (Poland) Monika Kotzian (2 times)
  - Women's Snowboard Cross SB-LL1/SB-LL2: (United States) Brenna Huckaby (2 times)
- February 21–23: WC #3 in (Germany) Grasgehren
  - Men's Snowboard Cross SB-UL: (Italy) Jacopo Luchini (1st) / (China) Ji Lijia (2nd)
  - Men's Snowboard Cross SB-LL1: (Canada) Noah Elliott (2 times)
  - Men's Snowboard Cross SB-LL2: (Japan) Takahito Ichikawa (1st) / (Italy) Emanuel Perathoner (2nd)
  - Women's Snowboard Cross SB-UL: (Poland) Monika Kotzian (2 times)
  - Women's Snowboard Cross SB-LL1/SB-LL2: (United States) Brenna Huckaby (2 times)
- February 27 – March 3: WC #4 in (Italy) Colere
  - Event was cancelled
- March 22–24: WC #5 in (Canada) Big White
  - Men's Snowboard Cross SB-UL: (Italy) Riccardo Cardani (1st) / (Italy) Jacopo Luchini (2nd)
  - Men's Snowboard Cross SB-LL1: (Canada) Tyler Turner (2 times)
  - Men's Snowboard Cross SB-LL2: (Australia) Ben Tudhope (1st) / (Italy) Emanuel Perathoner (2nd)
  - Women's Snowboard Cross SB-LL1/SB-LL2: (France) Cécile Hernandez (1st) / (United States) Brenna Huckaby (2nd)
- March 27–29: WC #6 in (Canada) Mt. Sima
  - Men's Banked Slalom SB-UL: (United States) Mike Minor (1st) / (Italy) Jacopo Luchini (2nd)
  - Men's Banked Slalom SB-LL1: (United States) Noah Elliott (2 times)
  - Men's Banked Slalom SB-LL2: (Italy) Emanuel Perathoner (2 times)
  - Women's Banked Slalom SB-UL: (United States) Peggy Martin (1st) / (United States) Darian Haynes (2nd)
  - Women's Banked Slalom SB-LL1/SB-LL2: (United States) Brenna Huckaby (2 times)

=== 2023–24 FIS Para-Snowboard Europa Cup ===
- November 29 – December 1, 2023: EC #1 in (Netherlands) Landgraaf
  - Men's Banked Slalom SB-UL: (United States) Colby Fields (2 times)
  - Men's Banked Slalom SB-LL1: (Brazil) Andre Barbieri (2 times)
  - Men's Banked Slalom SB-LL2: (Canada) Alex Massie (2 times)
  - Women's Banked Slalom SB-UL: (Brazil) Vanessa Molon (2 times)
  - Women's Banked Slalom SB-LL1: (France) Marine Bossut (2 times)
  - Women's Banked Slalom SB-LL2: (Japan) Eri Sakashita (2 times)
- February 5–7: EC #2 in (Finland) Pyhä
  - Men's Snowboard Cross SB-UL: (United States) Colby Fields (2 times)
  - Men's Snowboard Cross SB-LL1: (Canada) Chase Jacob Nicklin (2 times)
  - Men's Snowboard Cross SB-LL2: (Canada) Alex Massie (2 times)
  - Women's Snowboard Cross SB-UL: (United States) Isabelle Hicks (1st) / 2nd race was cancelled
  - Women's Snowboard Cross SB-LL1: (Spain) Raquel Martinez Muniz (2 times)
  - Women's Snowboard Cross SB-LL2: (United States) Kate Delson (2 times)
- February 21–23: EC #3 in (Germany) Grasgehren
  - Men's Snowboard Cross SB-UL: (China) Zhang Yiqi (1st) / (China) Wang Pengyao (2nd)
  - Men's Snowboard Cross SB-LL1: (China) Wu Zhongwei (2 times)
  - Men's Snowboard Cross SB-LL2: (China) Sun Qi (2 times)
  - Women's Snowboard Cross SB-UL: (United States) Isabelle Hicks (1st) / (Poland) Anna Drobna (2nd)
  - Women's Snowboard Cross SB-LL1: (Spain) Raquel Martinez Muniz (2 times)
  - Women's Snowboard Cross SB-LL2: (China) Wang Xinyu (2 times)
- February 27 – March 3: EC #4 in (Italy) Colere
  - Event was cancelled

=== 2023–24 FIS Para-Snowboard North American Cup ===
- March 22–24: NAC #1 in (Canada) Big White
  - Men's Snowboard Cross SB-UL: (United Kingdom) Matt Hamilton (2 times)
  - Men's Snowboard Cross SB-LL1: (Canada) Chase Jacob Nicklin (2 times)
  - Men's Snowboard Cross SB-LL2: (Canada) Philippe Nadreau (2 times)
  - Women's Snowboard Cross SB-UL: (United States) Isabelle Hicks (2 times)
  - Women's Snowboard Cross SB-LL2: (United States) Kate Delson (1st) / (Japan) Eri Sakashita (2nd)
- March 27–29: NAC #2 in (Canada) Mt. Sima
  - Men's Banked Slalom SB-UL: (United Kingdom) Matt Hamilton (2 times)
  - Men's Banked Slalom SB-LL1: (Germany) Christian Schmiedt (2 times)
  - Men's Banked Slalom SB-LL2: (Canada) Philippe Nadreau (2 times)
  - Women's Banked Slalom SB-UL: (United States) Isabelle Hicks (2 times)
  - Women's Banked Slalom SB-LL1/SB-LL2: (United States) Kate Delson (2 times)

=== 2023–24 FIS Para-Snowboard Asian Cup ===
- December 15–22, 2023: AC #1 in (China) Galaxy Ski Resort
  - Event was cancelled

=== International FIS Para-Competitions ===
- Calendar here

== Sitting volleyball ==
- World ParaVolley Calendar here

=== Paralympic Games ===
- August 29 – September 7: 2024 Summer Paralympics in (France) Paris

=== International Championships ===
- January 29 – February 3: 2024 African Sitting Volleyball Championships in Lagos
  - Men's tournament: (gold) Egypt; (silver) Morocco; (bronze) Rwanda
  - Women's tournament: (gold) Rwanda; (silver) Kenya; (bronze) Nigeria
- April 3–10: 2024 Paralympic Qualification Tournament in (China) Dali
- June 11–16: 2024 WPV Women's Super 6 in (France) Vandœuvre-lès-Nancy
- TBD: 2024 WPV Men's Super 6 in TBD

=== Beach ParaVolley ===
==== International Championships ====
- May 30 – June 2: 2024 WPV Beach Paravolley World Championships in (China) Chongqing

== Wheelchair basketball ==
- IWBF Calendar here

=== Paralympic Games ===
- August 29 – September 8: 2024 Summer Paralympics in (France) Paris

=== International IWBF Championships ===
- January 12–20: 2024 IWBF Asia-Oceania Championships in Bangkok
  - Men's tournament: (gold) Australia; (silver) Iran; (bronze) South Korea
  - Women's tournament: (gold) China; (silver) Japan; (bronze) Thailand
- January 27 – February 3: 2024 West Asia Para Games in Sharjah
  - Men's tournament: (gold) United Arab Emirates; (silver) Iraq; (bronze) Saudi Arabia
- March 29–31: 2024 International Easter Tournament in (Belgium) Blankenberge
- April 12–15: 2024 IWBF Men's Paralympic Repechage in (France) Antibes
- April 17–20: 2024 IWBF Women's Paralympic Repechage in (Japan) Osaka
- June 22–30: 2024 IWBF U25 Women's European Championship in (Spain) Villaviciosa de Odón
- June 22–30: 2024 IWBF U23 Men's European Championship in (Spain) Villaviciosa de Odón
- August 22–25: 2024 IWBF 3X3 Wheelchair Basketball Europe Cup in (Austria) Vienna

== Wheelchair curling ==
- World Curling Website here

=== World Championships ===
- November 5–10: 2023 World Wheelchair-B Curling Championship in (Finland) Lohja
  - (gold) Slovakia; (silver) Estonia; (bronze) Italy
- March 2–9: 2024 World Wheelchair Curling Championship in (South Korea) Gangneung
  - (gold) Norway; (silver) Canada; (bronze) China
- March 11–16: 2024 World Wheelchair Mixed Doubles Curling Championship in Gangneung
  - (gold) South Korea; (silver) China; (bronze) Italy

== Wheelchair fencing ==
- Wheelchair fencing competitions calendars here

=== Paralympic Games ===
- September 3–7: 2024 Summer Paralympics in (France) Paris

=== World & Continental Championships ===
- March 5–10: 2024 Wheelchair Fencing European Championships in (France) Paris

  - Epee Men - Category A: (United Kingdom) Piers Gilliver
  - Epee Men - Category B: (United Kingdom) Dimitri Coutya
  - Epee Men - Category C: (Ukraine) Serhii Shavkun
  - Foil Men - Category A: (Hungary) Richárd Osváth
  - Foil Men - Category B: (United Kingdom) Dimitri Coutya
  - Foil Men - Category C: (Ukraine) Serhii Shavkun
  - Sabre Men - Category A: (United Kingdom) Piers Gilliver
  - Sabre Men - Category B: (Poland) Adrian Castro
  - Epee Men Team: Ukraine
  - Foil Men Team: Great Britain
  - Sabre Men Team: Ukraine
  - Epee Women - Category A: (Ukraine) Yevheniia Breus
  - Epee Women - Category B: (Italy) Rossana Pasquino
  - Foil Women - Category A: (Hungary) Éva Hajmási
  - Foil Women - Category B: (Ukraine) Nadiia Doloh
  - Sabre Women - Category A: (Poland) Kinga Dróżdż
  - Sabre Women - Category B: (Italy) Rossana Pasquino
  - Epee Women Team: Poland
  - Foil Women Team: Hungary
  - Sabre Women Team: Ukraine

- April 21–23: 2024 Wheelchair Fencing Under 17 and Under 23 World Championships in (Thailand) Nakhon Ratchasima
- April 24–28: 2024 Wheelchair Fencing Asian Championships in (Thailand) Nakhon Ratchasima

  - Epee Men - Category A: (Iraq) Zainulabdeen Al-Madhkhoori
  - Epee Men - Category B: (Iraq) Ammar Ali
  - Foil Men - Category A: (Iraq) Zainulabdeen Al-Madhkhoori
  - Foil Men - Category B: (Thailand) Visit Kingmanaw
  - Sabre Men - Category A: (Japan) Shintaro Kano
  - Sabre Men - Category B: (Thailand) Chitiphat Charoenta
  - Epee Men Team: Iraq
  - Foil Men Team: Thailand
  - Sabre Men Team: Thailand
  - Epee Women - Category A: (South Korea) Kwon Hyo-Kyeong
  - Epee Women - Category B: (Thailand) Saysunee Jana
  - Foil Women - Category A: (South Korea) Kim Sun-mi
  - Foil Women - Category B: (Thailand) Saysunee Jana
  - Sabre Women - Category A: (Thailand) Duean Nakprasit
  - Sabre Women - Category B: (Thailand) Saysunee Jana
  - Epee Women Team: South Korea
  - Foil Women Team: Hong Kong
  - Sabre Women Team: Thailand

- May 16–20: 2024 Wheelchair Fencing American Championships in (Brazil) São Paulo

=== 2024 Wheelchair Fencing World Cup ===
- January 11–14: World Cup Wales - Great Britain in (United Kingdom) Cardiff

  - Epee Men - Category A: (United Kingdom) Piers Gilliver
  - Epee Men - Category B: (United Kingdom) Dimitri Coutya
  - Foil Men - Category A: (China) Sun Gang
  - Foil Men - Category B: (United Kingdom) Dimitri Coutya
  - Sabre Men - Category A: (Ukraine) Andrii Demchuk
  - Sabre Men - Category B: (China) Zhang Jie
  - Foil Men Team: China
  - Sabre Open Team: China
  - Epee Women - Category A: (China) Chen Yuandong
  - Epee Women - Category B: (Thailand) Saysunee Jana
  - Foil Women - Category A: (China) Gu Haiyan
  - Foil Women - Category B: (Thailand) Saysunee Jana
  - Sabre Women - Category A: (China) Gu Haiyan
  - Sabre Women - Category B: (China) Xiao Rong
  - Epee Women Team: China

- May 23–26: World Cup Brazil in São Paulo
- July 4–7: World Cup "Szabla Kilińskiego" in (Poland) Warsaw
- November 7–10: World Cup "The Leaning Tower" in (Italy) Pisa

=== 2024 Wheelchair Fencing Satellite Tournament ===
- June 22–24: Satellite Tournament "William of Orange" in (France) Orange

== Wheelchair rugby ==
- WWR Calendar here

=== Paralympic Games ===
- August 29 – September 2: 2024 Summer Paralympics in (France) Paris

=== International Championships ===
- March 17–25: 2024 Paralympic Qualification Tournament in (New Zealand) Wellington
  - Qualified teams: Australia, Canada, Germany
- April 16–18: 2024 Quad Nations in (United Kingdom) Cardiff
- June 3–10: 2024 Canada Cup International Wheelchair Rugby Tournament in Canada
- November 18–20: 2024 Wheelchair Rugby Shibuya Cup in (Japan) Tokyo

== Wheelchair tennis ==
- Full 2024 UNIQLO Wheelchair Tennis Tour Calendar here.

=== Paralympic Games ===
- August 30 – September 7: 2024 Summer Paralympics in (France) Paris

=== Grand Slam ===
- January 15–28: 2024 Australian Open
  - Wheelchair singles winners: (Japan) Tokito Oda (m) / (Netherlands) Diede de Groot (f)
  - Wheelchair quad singles winner: (Netherlands) Sam Schröder
  - Wheelchair doubles winners: (United Kingdom) Alfie Hewett & Gordon Reid (m) / (Netherlands) Diede de Groot & Jiske Griffioen (f)
  - Wheelchair quad doubles winner: (United Kingdom) Andy Lapthorne & (United States) David Wagner
- May 26 – June 8: 2024 French Open
- July 1–14: 2024 Wimbledon Championships
- August 26 – September 8: 2024 US Open

=== ITF Super Series ===
- January 14–19: Melbourne Wheelchair Open in (Australia) Melbourne
  - Wheelchair singles winners: (Japan) Tokito Oda (m) / (Netherlands) Diede de Groot (f)
  - Wheelchair quad singles winner: (Netherlands) Sam Schröder
  - Wheelchair doubles winners: (United Kingdom) Alfie Hewett & Gordon Reid (m) / (Netherlands) Diede de Groot & Aniek van Koot (f)
  - Wheelchair quad doubles winner: (South Africa) Donald Ramphadi & (Israel) Guy Sasson
- March 5–10: Cajun Classic in (United States) Baton Rouge
  - Wheelchair singles winners: (United Kingdom) Alfie Hewett (m) / (Netherlands) Diede de Groot (f)
  - Wheelchair quad singles winner: (Netherlands) Sam Schröder
  - Wheelchair doubles winners: (United Kingdom) Alfie Hewett & Gordon Reid (m) / (Japan) Yui Kamiji & (South Africa) Kgothatso Montjane (f)
  - Wheelchair quad doubles winner: (United Kingdom) Andy Lapthorne & (United States) David Wagner
- April 9–14: Japan Open in Iizuka
- June 11–16: French Riviera Open in (France) Biot
