= Judo at the 2012 Summer Paralympics – Women's 48 kg =

Judo – Women's 48 kg at the XIV Paralympic Games
- Venue: ExCeL London
- Date: 30 August 2012
- Competitors: 8 from 8 nations

Medalists
1st place, gold medalist(s)		Carmen Brussig	Germany
2nd place, silver medalist(s)		Lee Kai-Lin	Chinese Taipei
3rd place, bronze medalist(s)		Victoria Potapova	Russia
3rd place, bronze medalist(s)		Yuliya Halinska	Ukraine

The women's 48 kg para judo competition at the 2012 Summer Paralympics was held on 30 August at ExCeL London.

== Results ==
Quarterfinals
Victoria Potapova (RUS)	0001
Carmen Brussig (GER)	100
Laura García Benítez (ESP)	000
Yuliya Halinska (UKR)	101
Huang Xiaoli (CHN)	000
Karla Cardoso (BRA)	0011
Lee Kai-Lin (TPE)	100
Solène Laclau (FRA)	0001

Semifinals
Carmen Brussig (GER)	0021
Yuliya Halinska (UKR)	0002
Karla Cardoso (BRA)	001
Lee Kai-Lin (TPE)	002

Final
Carmen Brussig (GER)	010
Lee Kai-Lin (TPE)	001

=== Repechage ===
Repechage
V Potapova (RUS)	010
L García Benítez (ESP)	000

Bronze medal finals
V Potapova (RUS)	001
K Cardoso (BRA)	0001

Repechage
Huang X (CHN)	024
S Laclau (FRA)	0002

Bronze medal finals
Huang X (CHN)	000
Y Halinska (UKR)	100
