= Carmen Brussig =

German and Swiss judoka (born 1977)

Personal information
- Born: 20 May 1977 (age 49) Leipzig, Germany
- Occupation: Judoka
- Height: 1.64 m (5 ft 5 in)

Sport
- Country: Germany; Switzerland
- Sport: Para judo
- Disability class: B2
- Club: PSV Schwerin
- Coached by: Alexandra Schiesser; Peter Brüggert
Medal record
Para Judo
Representing Germany
Paralympic Games
Gold medal – first place	2012 London	-48 kg
Silver medal – second place	2016 Rio	-48 kg
Bronze medal – third place	2008 Beijing	-48 kg

Profile at external databases
- IJF: 60351
- JudoInside.com: 23217

Carmen Brussig (born 20 May 1977) is a German and Swiss judoka who has won numerous tournaments including Paralympic and world championship gold.

Brussig was born in Leipzig with visual impairments and competes in B2 classification events. She made her Paralympic debut at the 2008 Summer Paralympics in Beijing winning a bronze medal in the under 48 kg weight class. She lost in the quarterfinal to Russian judoka Victoria Potapova but won the repechage against Cuban Maria Gonzalez to claim the bronze. Four years later, in the London Games, Brussig claimed gold by beating Potapova in the quarterfinal and Yuliya Halinska in the semifinal. This put Brussig into the final for the first time where she faced and defeated Lee Kai Lin. When defending her title at the 2016 Games in Rio de Janeiro she won the semifinal against Halinska but then lost in the final to world champion Li Liqing, earning herself a silver medal.

Her judoka career outside the Paralympic Games has also seen Brussig achieve great successes. She has won eight international tournaments between 2001 and 2014, along with six silver and three bronze medals. Brussig lives in Switzerland and competes in national Swiss tournaments, finishing in the top three eight times between 2005 and 2014. In 2015 she won the world championship in her weight category for the third time, having achieved the same feat in 2006 and 2007.

Brussig is 15 minutes older than her identical twin sister, Ramona Brussig, also a medal-winning judoka. The pair won Paralympic gold within 15 minutes of each other in London 2012, with Ramona competing in the heavier under 52 weight category. Both sisters are listed amongst the most promising German medal candidates for the 2020 Summer Paralympics in Tokyo, resulting in them being given financial support in their endeavours.

She competed for Switzerland at the 2024 Summer Paralympics, finishing 7th in the women's -48 kg J2 event.

Brussig trained as a pastry chef until her visual impairments stopped her from continuing with that career.

== Competitive results ==
As of 2017:

Paralympic Games

- 2008 – 3rd place
- 2012 – 1st place
- 2016 – 2nd place

World Championships

- 2006 – 1st place singles and team
- 2007 – 1st place singles and team
- 2010 – 3rd place
- 2011 – 2nd place
- 2014 – 2nd place
- 2015 – 1st place

European Championships

- 2007 – 1st place singles and team
- 2009 – 3rd place team
- 2009 – 2nd place
- 2011 – 3rd place
- 2013 – 2nd place
- 2015 – 2nd place

German championships

- 2005 – 2nd place
- 2006 – 1st place
- 2007 – 1st place
- 2008 – 1st place
- 2009 – 1st place
- 2010 – 1st place
- 2011 – 1st place
- 2012 – 2nd place
- 2013 – 1st place
- 2014 – 1st place
- 2017 – 1st place

Swiss championships

- 2005 – 1st place
- 2006 – 2nd place
- 2007 – 3rd place
- 2008 – 3rd place
- 2009 – 2nd place
- 2010 – 5th place
- 2012 – 2nd place
- 2013 – 3rd place
- 2014 – 3rd place
