= Judo at the 2024 Summer Paralympics – Women's 48 kg J2 =

Judo – Women's 48 kg J2 at the XVII Paralympic Games
- Venue: Grand Palais Éphémère
- Date: 5 September 2024
- Competitors: 8 from 8 nations

Medalists
1st place, gold medalist(s)		Akmaral Nauatbek	Kazakhstan
2nd place, silver medalist(s)		Sandrine Martinet	France
3rd place, bronze medalist(s)		Li Liqing	China
3rd place, bronze medalist(s)		Cahide Eke	Turkey

The women's 48 kg J2 judo competition at the 2024 Summer Paralympics was held from 5 September 2024 at the Grand Palais Éphémère.

== Results ==
=== Bracket ===
Quarterfinals
Akmaral Nauatbek (KAZ)	10
Kokila Kaushiklate (IND)	0
Yuliia Ivanytska (UKR)	0
Cahide Eke (TUR)	1
Li Liqing (CHN)	10
Carmen Brussig (SUI)	0
Sandrine Martinet (FRA)	11
Isabell Thal (GER)	0

Semifinals
Akmaral Nauatbek (KAZ)	11
Cahide Eke (TUR)	0
Li Liqing (CHN)	1
Sandrine Martinet (FRA)	10

Final
Akmaral Nauatbek (KAZ)	10
Sandrine Martinet (FRA)	0

=== Repechage ===
Repechage
Kokila Kaushiklate (IND)	0
Yuliia Ivanytska (UKR)	10
Carmen Brussig (SUI)	0
Isabell Thal (GER)	10

Bronze medal
Yuliia Ivanytska (UKR)	0
Li Liqing (CHN)	10
Isabell Thal (GER)	0
Cahide Eke (TUR)	10
