= Judo at the 2016 Summer Paralympics – Women's 48 kg =

Judo – Women's 48 kg at the XV Paralympic Games
- Venue: Carioca Arena 3
- Date: 8 September 2016
- Competitors: 8 from 8 nations

Medalists
1st place, gold medalist(s)		Li Liqing	China
2nd place, silver medalist(s)		Carmen Brussig	Germany
3rd place, bronze medalist(s)		Ecem Tasin	Turkey
3rd place, bronze medalist(s)		Yuliya Halinska	Ukraine

The women's 48 kg judo competition at the 2016 Summer Paralympics was held on 8 September at Carioca Arena 3.

== Results ==
Quarterfinals
1	Carmen Brussig (GER)	100
7	Ecem Tasin (TUR)	000
3	Yuliya Halinska (UKR)	100
5	Karla Cardoso (BRA)	000
2	Lee Kai-lin (TPE)	100
6	Paula Gomez (ARG)	000
4	Li Liqing (CHN)	100
8	Shizuka Hangai (JPN)	000^{1}

Semifinals
1	Carmen Brussig (GER)	001
3	Yuliya Halinska (UKR)	000
2	Lee Kai-lin (TPE)	000^{1}
4	Li Liqing (CHN)	000

Final
1	Carmen Brussig (GER)	000
4	Li Liqing (CHN)	102

=== Repechage ===
Repechage
Ecem Tasin (TUR)	100
Karla Cardoso (BRA)	000
Paula Gomez (ARG)	000^{1}
Shizuka Hangai (JPN)	000

Bronze medal matches
Ecem Tasin (TUR)	010
Lee Kai-lin (TPE)	002
Hangai Shizuka (JPN)	000
Yuliya Halinska (UKR)	001
