= Hakan Akkaya =

Turkish wheelchair fencer (born 1995)

Personal information
- Born: 7 March 1995 (age 31) Bursa, Turkey
- Education: Ankara University
- Years active: 2015–

Sport
- Country: Turkey
- Sport: Wheelchair fencing
- Disability class: A
- Event(s): Épée and foil
- Club: Nilüfer Belediyespor
Medal record
Men's wheelchair fencing
Representing Turkey
Paralympic Games
Bronze medal – third place	2024 Paris	Épée A
World Cup
Gold medal – first place	2024 Pisa	Foil A
Gold medal – first place	2024 Pisa	Épée A

Hakan Akkaya (born 7 March 1995) is a Turkish Paralympian wheelchair fencer of sport class A. He is Turkey's first international wheelchair fencer.

== Personal life ==
Hakan Akkaya was born in Bursa, Turkey on 7 March 1995. At the age of three, he lost his two legs below the knee after he was exposed to electric shocks from touching electrical wires while playing on his home balcony.

Akkaya is a graduate of Ankara University.

== Sport career ==
In 2013, Akkaya began with wheelchair fencing at the local club Nilüfer Belediyespor, which shortly opened up a branch for disabled sports. As no branch of wheelchair fencing existed within the Physically Disabled Sports Federation of Turkey (Turkish: Türkiye Bedensel Engelliler Spor Federasyonu, TBESF), he participated in international competitions without being a national athlete, and won several medals.

Although not a national athlete, Akkaya was admitted to the IWAS Junior World Games held in Stadskanaal, Netherlands, at which he became champion in the foil event. He thus became a pioneer in that sport branch in Turkey, and following his international debut, the wheelchair fencing branch was officially established under the TBESF. He took part at the 2016 IWAS Wheelchair Fencing Under 17 and Under 23 World Championships in Stadskanaal, Netherlands, and became runner-up in the épée and shared the third place in the foil events of the age group U23.

After his participation at the Wheelchair Fencing World Championships in 2015 in Eger, Hungary, Akkaya took part in the same competition in the épée and foil events in 2017 in Rome, Italy and in 2019 in Cheongju, South Korea, as well as at the 2018 Wheelchair Fencing European Championships in Terni, Italy.

Akkaya competed at the 2020 Summer Paralympics in Tokyo, Japan. He was not able to pass the qualification rounds after winning only one of the total six matches.

At the 2024 Paris Paralympic Games, he won the bronze medal in the Individual épée event.

Akkaya captured the gold medal in the Individual foil A event and another gold medal in the Individual épée A event at the 2024 World Cup in Pisa, Italy.

== Achievements ==
In the senior category, he competed at the world and European championships as well as at the Paralympics in the foil and épée events of sport class A.

Year	Competition	Place	Event	Result
2015	Wheelchair Fencing World Championships	(Hungary) Eger	Individual foil A	31
2015	Wheelchair Fencing World Championships	(Hungary) Eger	Individual épée A	32
2017	Wheelchair Fencing World Championships	(Italy) Rome	Individual foil A	12
2017	Wheelchair Fencing World Championships	(Italy) Rome	Individual épée A	26
2018	IWAS Wheelchair Fencing European Championships	(Italy) Terni	Individual foil A	11
2018	IWAS Wheelchair Fencing European Championships	(Italy) Terni	Individual épée A	17
2019	Wheelchair Fencing World Championships	(South Korea) Cheongju	Individual foil A	18
2019	Wheelchair Fencing World Championships	(South Korea) Cheongju	Individual épée A	22
2021	2020 Summer Paralympics	(Japan) Tokyo	Individual foil A	Gr. stage 6
2021	2020 Summer Paralympics	(Japan) Tokyo	Individual épée A	Gr. stage 4
2024	2024 Summer Paralympics	(France) Paris	Individual foil	6
2024	2024 Summer Paralympics	(France) Paris	Individual épée	3rd place, bronze medalist(s)
2024	World Cup	(Italy) Pisa	Individual foil A	1st place, gold medalist(s)
2024	World Cup	(Italy) Pisa	Individual épée A	1st place, gold medalist(s)
