= Kokila Kaushiklate =

Indian Paralympic athlete

Personal information
- Born: 17 October 2003 (age 23) Jind district, India

Sport
- Sport: Paralympic judo
Medal record
Representing India
Asian Para Games
Silver medal – second place	2026 Aichi–Nagoya	−52kg J2
Bronze medal – third place	2022 Hangzhou	−48kg J2

Kokila Kaushiklate (born 17 October 2003) is a visually challenged para judoka. She won the bronze medal in the women's 48-kg J2 event at the 2022 Asian Para Games. She also represented India at the 2024 Summer Paralympics where India made its debut in the judo event.

== Early life and education ==
Kaushiklate is from Kasun village in Jind district but currently resides in Azad Nagar, Hisar, Haryana. Her father is a teacher, and her mother is a social worker. She studied Class 12 at the Government Girls Senior Secondary School in Rupana village, Haryana. She is supported by Olympic Gold Quest.

== Career ==
Kaushiklate first won an international medal at the Commonwealth Judo Championships, winning a silver medal in 2019. Her bronze medal in the 48 kg J2 event at Asian Para Games got her a quota place in the Paralympics. Thus, she was part of the two member Indian team that made its debut in judo at the 2024 Summer Paralympics in Paris. She lost to Yuliia Ivanytska of Ukraine in the 2nd repechage round, Akmaral Nauatbek of Kazakh beat her in the quarterfinals. For the Indian, it is a learning experience on a big stage, as she lost both bouts 0–10.

=== Domestic career ===
Kaushiklate is also the three-time national champion.
