= Cahide Eke =

Turkish Paralympic judoka (born 2000)

Personal information
- Born: 25 January 2000 (age 26)
- Home town: Karaman, Turkey
- Occupation: Judoka

Sport
- Country: Turkey
- Sport: Para Judo
- Disability class: J2
- Weight class: −48 kg
- Club: Karaman GSK
Medal record
Women's para judo
Representing Turkey
Paralympic Games
Bronze medal – third place	2024 Paris	−48 kg J2

Profile at external databases
- JudoInside.com: 123028
- Updated on 7 October 2024

Cahide Eke (born 25 January 2000) is a Turkish visually impaired judoka (disability class B3) competing in the +48 kg division. She won the bronze medal at the 2024 Summer Paralympics held in Paris, France.

== Sport career ==
Eke started performing para judo at the age of 15 when she met a judo coach during the opening ceremony of her high school. After two-month training, she took part at the Turkish Championships, and became winner. She was then admitted to the national team.

She is a member of her local club Karaman GSK, and competes in the 48 kg J2 division. She has five Turkish champion titles.

In April 2018, she competed in the -48 kg division at the IBSA Judo World Cup in Antalya, Turkey, and in September, at the IBSA Judo World Cup in Atyrau, Kazakhstan. She secured 5th place in both tournaments. In December, Eke made history as the first blind Turkish judoka to face sighted opponents in a local competition in 2018.

On May 13, 2019, she participated in the -52 kg event at the IBSA Judo Grand Prix in Baku, and placed 7th. In September of the same year, she achieved 5th place in the -52 kg event at the IBSA Judo Grand Prix in Tashkent.

In July 2019, she competed in the -52 kg event at the IBSA European Judo Championships in Genova, Italy, and took the fifth place.

In 2022, Eke competed in the -48 kg event at the IBSA World Championships in Baku, finishing in 5th place. The following year, she took part in the same event at the IBSA World Championships in Birmingham, England, where she achieved 5th place once again. In 2023, she also participated in the -48 kg event at the IBSA Judo Grand Prix Baku, and placed 5th.

In February 2024, she won the bronze medal at the IBSA Judo Grand Prix Germany in Heidelberg. For the Paralympics, she exercised at the Olympics Preparation Center in Kastamonu. She competed at the 2024 Summer Paralympics held in Paris, France, and won a bronze medal in the women's 48 kg J2 event.

== Personal life ==
Cahide Eke was born on 25 January 2000. She lives in Karaman, Turkey.

She is visual impaired at 90% visual acuity loss, almost blind, due to congenital albinism.
