= Karima Medjeded =

French judoka

Medal record

Women's para judo

Representing France

Paralympic Games
Gold medal – first place	2004 Athens	-48 kg

Karima Medjeded is a blind French judoka.

She was the first person to win a gold medal at the 2004 Summer Paralympics in Athens, when she competed in the women's extra-lightweight category in judo. Medjeded defeated three consecutive opponents by ippon, including Brazil's Karla Cardoso in the final.

She was subsequently awarded a knighthood in the Légion d'honneur, the highest decoration in France, by French President Jacques Chirac.

At the 2008 Summer Paralympics in Beijing, she competed in the women's 48 kg weightclass and finished tied for seventh place.

Medjeded lives in Bordeaux.
