= Judo at the 2004 Summer Paralympics – Women's 48 kg =

Judo - Women's up to 48 kg at the XII Paralympic Games
- Paralympic Judo
- Venue: Ano Liossia Olympic Hall
- Dates: 18 September 2004
- Competitors: 7 from 7 nations

Medalists
1st place, gold medalist(s)		Karima Medjeded	France
2nd place, silver medalist(s)		Karla Cardoso	Brazil
3rd place, bronze medalist(s)		Viktoriya Potapova	Russia
3rd place, bronze medalist(s)		Astrid Arndt	Germany

The Women's up to 48 kg judo competition at the 2004 Summer Paralympics was held on 18 September at the Ano Liossia Olympic Hall.

The tournament bracket consisted of a single-elimination contest culminating in a gold medal match. There was also a repechage to determine the winners of the two bronze medals. The losing quarter-finalists competed in the repechage, and the two judokas who lost in the semifinals faced the winner of the opposite half of the bracket's repechage in bronze medal bouts.

The event was won by Karima Medjeded, representing France.

== Results ==
The four digits represent scores of ippon, waza-ari, yuko and koka (which was still used at the time). A letter indicates a penalty of shido, chui, keikoku or hansoku make, which (at the time) also registered a score of koka, yuko, waza-ari or ippon, respectively, to the opponent. Penalties are escalated, thus 2 shido = chui, 3 shido = keikoku, 4 shido = hansoku make, save that a penalty of hansoku make direct results in exclusion from the remainder of the competition, while if it results from escalation it does not.

=== Competition bracket ===
Quarterfinals
Christina Skandli (GRE)	0001
Karima Medjeded (FRA)	1100
Viktoriya Potapova (RUS)	1000
Guo Hua Ping (CHN)	0000
Masami Akatsuka (JPN)	0000
Astrid Arndt (GER)	1000

Semifinals
Karima Medjeded (FRA)	1000
Viktoriya Potapova (RUS)	0010
Karla Cardoso (BRA)	0100
Astrid Arndt (GER)	0000

Finals
Karima Medjeded (FRA)	1010S
Karla Cardoso (BRA)	0001

=== Repechage ===
Round 1
Christina Skandli (GRE)	0000
Guo Hua Ping (CHN)	0220

Bronze medal matches
Guo Hua Ping (CHN)	0000
Astrid Arndt (GER)	1000
Masami Akatsuka (JPN)	0000
Viktoriya Potapova (RUS)	1010
