= Sandrine Martinet =

French judoka (born 1982)

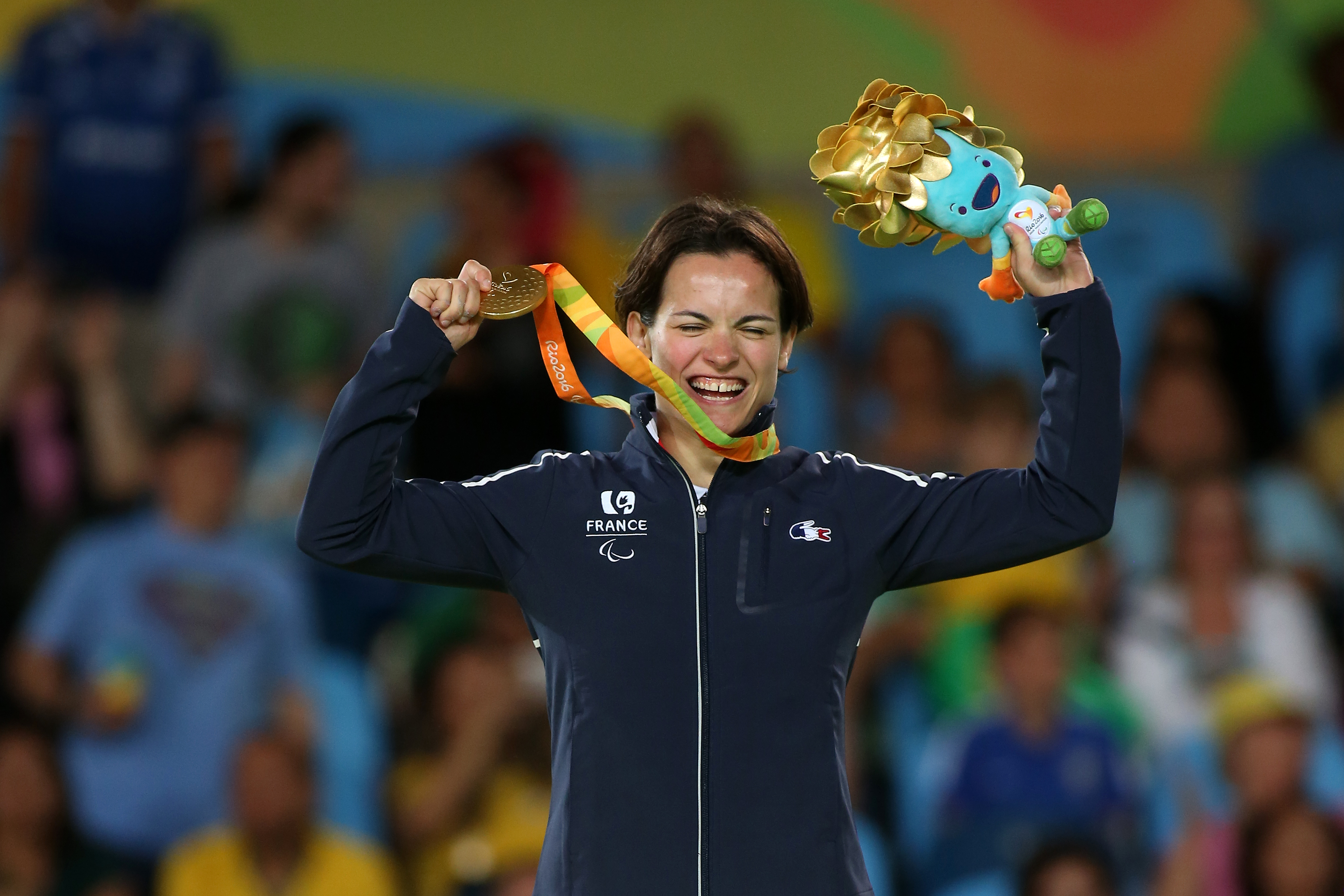
- Martinet at 2016 Rio Paralympics

Personal information
- Full name: Sandrine Aurières-Martinet
- Born: Sandrine Aurières; 10 November 1982 (age 43) Montreuil, France
- Occupation: Judoka

Sport
- Country: France
- Sport: Para Judo
- Disability class: J2
- Weight class: −48 kg
Medal record
Women's para judo
Representing France
Event / 1st / 2nd / 3rd; Paralympic Games / 1 / 4 / 0
Paralympic Games
Gold medal – first place	2016 Rio	−52 kg
Silver medal – second place	2004 Athens	−52 kg
Silver medal – second place	2008 Beijing	−52 kg
Silver medal – second place	2020 Tokyo	−48 kg
Silver medal – second place	2024 Paris	−48 kg J2
- Updated on 21 September 2024

Sandrine Martinet (born 10 November 1982, in Montreuil, Seine-Saint-Denis), born Sandrine Aurières and also known as Sandrine Aurières-Martinet, is a Paralympic judoka who won a gold medal for France at the 2016 Summer Paralympics. She has also won four silver medals for France at Paralympic games.

== Early life ==
Sandrine Aurières was born in 1982 in Montreuil, Seine-Saint-Denis. She was born visually impaired with achromatopsia. She started judo when she was nine years old.

== Career ==
Martinet competed in her first para judo competition in Germany when she was 16, competing in the junior category. She joined the French national team in 2002.

Martinet made her Paralympic debut at the 2004 Summer Paralympics, the first Paralympic games to include women's para judo. She won a silver medal at the 2004 games and then again at the 2008 Summer Paralympics in women's -52 kg. She placed fifth place at the 2012 Summer Paralympics after an ankle injury forced her to drop out of the bronze medal match.

Martinet won bronze in judo at the 2015 IBSA World Games. She won gold at the 2016 Visually Impaired Grand Prix and at the 2016 Summer Paralympics in women's -52 kg. The Paralympic medal was France's first gold medal at a Paralympic games.

In 2021, Martinet was designated France's flag bearer for the 2020 Summer Paralympics, alongside Stéphane Houdet. She won a silver medal in women's -48 kg, having moved down a weight category from -52 kg which she had competed in at the previous games. She had announced that the 2020 Summer Paralympics would be her last, but came out of retirement in 2022 with the intent to compete at the 2024 Paralympics.

She won silver at the 2024 Summer Paralympics in women's -48 kg J2.

== Personal life ==
She met her husband, Nicholas, in 2002 through judo. They have two children. Martinet works as a physiotherapist.
