= Shahana Hajiyeva =

Azerbaijani Paralympic judoka

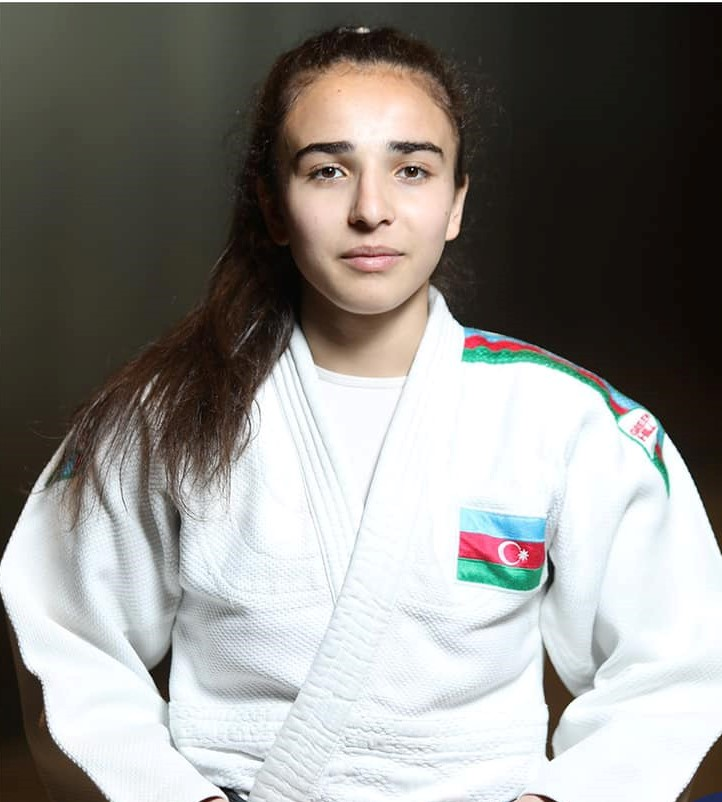

Personal information
- Native name: Şəhanə Hacıyeva
- Born: 6 July 2000 (age 26)
- Occupation: Judoka

Sport
- Country: Azerbaijan
- Sport: Paralympic judo

Achievements and titles
- Paralympic Games: (gold) (2020)
Medal record
Women's judo
Representing Azerbaijan
Paralympic Games
| Gold medal – first place | 2020 Tokyo | –48 kg |
European Para Championships
| Gold medal – first place | 2023 Rotterdam | –48kg J2 |
European Cadet Championships
| Gold medal – first place | 2015 Sofia | –40 kg |

Profile at external databases
- IJF: 20751
- JudoInside.com: 95692

Shahana Hajiyeva (Azerbaijani: Şəhanə Hacıyeva; born 6 July 2000) is an Azerbaijani former Paralympic judoka. She won the gold medal in the women's 48 kg event at the 2020 Summer Paralympics and at the 2023 European Para Championships. In 2025, she was permanently banned from para judo, after the International Blind Sports Federation determined that she did not have a visual impairment.

== Career ==
In 2015, Hajiyeva competed against fully-sighted athletes at the European Cadet Judo Championships in Sofia. She won gold in the -40kg category.

Hajiyeva won silver at the 2018 Judo World Championships in Odivelas, Portugal. At the opening event of the 2019 Grand Prix season in Baku, Azerbaijan, she won gold in the women's -48 kg event, and a bronze medal in Tashkent. Hajiyeva made her Paralympic debut at the 2020 Summer Paralympics, where she won gold medal in the women's 48 kg event. After the games, President Ilham Aliyev awarded her the 1st-class For Service to the Fatherland Order due to her success at the Paralympics and her contributions to Azerbaijani sports. She also won a bronze medal in Baku at the 2021 IBSA World Cup.

In August 2023, she won the European Para Championships in Rotterdam, competing in women's J2. The same year, she also won a silver medal in Tokyo, and a bronze medal in Baku during the IBSA World Cup.

In September 2025, she was appointed by Kamaladdin Heydarov as Chief Adviser of the Awareness Sector at the MES Sumgayit Regional Center.

=== Permanent disqualification ===
In May 2025, in the medical classification for the 2025 International Blind Sports Federation (IBSA) Judo World Championships to be held in Astana, the IBSA Medical Committee determined that Hajiyeva's level of visual acuity was above the threshold permitted for the J2 class. She was disqualified from the Astana Championships and permanently barred from participating in para judo competitions. The National Paralympic Committee of Azerbaijan has defended Hajiyeva, citing changes to the classification criteria; other sources have accused Hajiyeva of deliberately misrepresenting her ability and cheating.
