= Viktoriya Potapova =

Russian Paralympic judoka (born 1974)

Personal information
- Born: 8 January 1974 (age 52)
- Occupation: Judoka

Sport
- Country: Russia
- Sport: Paralympic judo
Medal record
Paralympic Games
| Bronze medal – third place | 2004 Athens | 48 kg |
| Bronze medal – third place | 2008 Beijing | 48 kg |
| Bronze medal – third place | 2012 London | 48 kg |
| Bronze medal – third place | 2020 Tokyo | 48 kg |

Viktoriya Potapova (Note: Sometimes spelled as Victoria Potapova or Viktoriia Potapova.) (born 8 January 1974) is a Russian Paralympic judoka. She represented Russia at the Summer Paralympics in 2004, 2008 and 2012. She won a bronze medal on each occasion: in the women's 48 kg event in 2004, in the women's 48 kg event in 2008 and in the women's 48 kg event in 2012. She also represented the Russian Paralympic Committee athletes at the 2020 Summer Paralympics held in Tokyo, Japan and she won one of the bronze medals in the women's 48 kg event.

At the 2015 IBSA European Judo Championships held in Odivelas, Portugal, she won the gold medal in the women's 48 kg event.
