= Shi Yijie =

Chinese Paralympic judoka (born 2000)

Personal information
- Nationality: Chinese
- Born: 17 July 2000 (age 25) Chenzhou, China

Sport
- Sport: Para judo
- Disability class: J1
- Weight class: −57 kg
Medal record
Women's para judo
Representing China
Paralympic Games
Gold medal – first place	2024 Paris	−57 kg J1

Shi Yijie (born 17 July 2000) is a Chinese Paralympic judoka. She represented China at the 2024 Summer Paralympics.

== Career ==
Shi represented China at the 2024 Summer Paralympics and won a gold medal in the −57 kg J1 event.
