= Akmaral Nauatbek =

Kazakh Paralympic judoka

Personal information
- Born: 8 January 1999 (age 27)
- Occupation: Judoka

Sport
- Country: Kazakhstan
- Sport: Para Judo
- Disability class: J2
- Weight class: −48 kg

Achievements and titles
- Paralympic Games: (gold) (2024)
Medal record
Women's para judo
Representing Kazakhstan
Paralympic Games
Gold medal – first place	2024 Paris	−48 kg J2

Profile at external databases
- IJF: 20880
- JudoInside.com: 44400
- Updated on 5 September 2024

Akmaral Nauatbek (born 8 January 1999) is a Kazakh Paralympic judoka. She competed at the 2024 Summer Paralympics and won the gold medal in the women's 48 kg J2 event.
