= Ecem Taşın =

Turkish para judoka (born 1991)

Personal information
- Full name: Ecem Çavdar Taşın
- Nationality: Turkish
- Born: 20 January 1991 (age 35)
- Occupation: Judoka
- Height: 1.64 m (5 ft 5 in)

Sport
- Country: Turkey
- Sport: Para judo
- Disability class: J1
- Weight class: −48 kg
- Club: Edirne Judo Olimpik Spor Kulübü

Achievements and titles
- Paralympic Games: 2016, 2024,
Medal record
Women's para judo
Representing Turkey
Paralympic Games
Bronze medal – third place	2016 Rio de Janeiro	−48 kg
Bronze medal – third place	2024 Paris	−48 kg J1
IBSA Judo World Championship
Silver medal – second place	2022 Baku	-48 kg
Silver medal – second place	2023 Birmingham	-48 kg
IBSA European Championships
Silver medal – second place	2017 Walsall	−48 kg
Bronze medal – third place	2019 Genoa	−48 kg
Bronze medal – third place	2015 Odivelas	−48 kg
Bronze medal – third place	2013 Eger	−48 kg
European Para Championships
Silver medal – second place	2023 Rotterdam	–48 kg J1

Profile at external databases
- IJF: 64986
- JudoInside.com: 99804
- Updated on 17 October 2024

Ecem Çavdar Taşın (born 20 January 1991) is a Turkish female visually impaired judoka (disability class B2) competing in the −48 kg division. She won the bronze medal at the 2016 and 2024 Summer Paralympics.

== Sport career ==
Taşın studied sport management at Trakya University in Edirne, Turkey. She started her sports career with athletics. After losing her eyesight at the age of 18, she stopped practicing athletics and later began to engage in judo. She is a member of the Edirne Judo Olimpik Spor Kulübü and she is coached by Şengül Demiral.

=== 2010's ===
In 2011, she participated at the IBSA World Games held in Antalya, Turkey and finished in 7th place. Taşın captured a bronze medal at the 2013 IBSA European Judo Championships held in Eger, Hungary.

She competed at the 2014 IBSA World Championships in Colorado Springs, USA and took 7th place.

In February 2015, Taşın competed at the IBSA World Cup held in Eger, Hungary and took 7th place. In May, she competed at the IBSA World Games in Seoul, South Korea and took 5th place. In October, she took a bronze medal in the extra-lightweight (48 kg) event at the 2015 IBSA European Judo Championships in Odivelas, Portugal, and so obtained a quota spot for the 2016 Summer Paralympics. At the Paralympics, she won a bronze medal.

In January 2017, she competed at the IBSA World Cup in Tashkent and secured the bronze medal. In August of the same year, she won the silver medal at the IBSA European Championships held in Walsall, England.

In 2018, Taşın secured 3rd place at the IBSA World Cup held in Antalya in April and again at the same event held in Atyrau in September. In November of the same year, she took 5th place at the IBSA World Championships in Odivelas, Portugal.

At the 2019 IBSA European Judo Championships in Genoa, Italy, she became bronze medalist. In May 2019, she competed at the IBSA Judo Grand Prix Baku and took the 5th place. In 2021, she competed at the same event and won the gold medal.

=== 2020's ===
Taşın participated at the 2020 Summer Paralympics held in Tokyo, Japan and she finished in the 7th place. In the Paralympics, she got injured, tearing her cruciate ligaments.

In 2022, she took the silver medal at the IBSA Judo World Championship in Baku, Azerbaijan.

In January 2023, Taşın won the silver medal at the IBSA Grand Prix in Almada, Portugal. In August, she won the silver medal at the European Para Championships held in Rotterdam, Netherlands and another silver medal at the IBSA World Championships held in Birmingham, England.

She competed in the J1 event at the 2024 Summer Paralympics held in Paris, France and secured the bronze medal.

== Personal life ==
Ecem Çavdar Taşın was born on January 20, 1991. She had no visual impairment until the age of 18, but after that, she began to lose her eyesight and currently has 95% vision loss.
