= Laura García Benítez =

Spanish judoka (born 1981)

Laura García Benitez
Personal information
- Nationality: Spanish

Sport
- Country: Spain
- Sport: Judo

Laura García Benitez (born 19 April 1981 in Pamplona) is a Spanish judoka who has represented Spain at the 2008 and 2012 Summer Paralympics.

== Personal ==
García was born on 19 April 1981 in Pamplona, and is from the Navarre region of Spain. Her father practiced karate but because of her vision problems, she was unable to follow him in the sport.

García has lived in Barañáin. She attended Colegio Público Eulza. She attended the Polytechnic Carlos III in Pamplona, where she trained to become a kindergarten assistant. Following the completion of her program, she decided instead to sell coupons for ONCE.

== Judo ==
García took up judo when she was eight years old and living in Lagunak because a friend was practicing the sport. After three years, she stopped playing it, only to take it up again when she was twenty-one years old.

Competing at the 2007 IPC European Judo Championships in Azerbaijan, García came away with a bronze medal. In April 2008, she was one of four Navarre sportspeople on the short list to attend the Beijing Paralympics. Prior to the 2008 Games, she trained in France. That year, she had financial support to compete at the highest level because of funding through Plan ADOP. She competed at the 2008 Summer Paralympics in judo as a 27-year-old in the less than 48 kilogram group. In October 2011, she competed in a regional Spanish national vision impaired judo event in Guadalajara. In 2011, she competed at the IPC Judo World Championships. In 2012, she was coached by Yolanda Soler and José Tomás Toro while based in Larrabide. She competed at the 2012 Summer Paralympics in the less than 48 kilogram group. She lost her first match and then lost in the repechage. One of her matches was against Ukrainian Yuliya During. Overall, she finished in seventh place, enough to get her a Paralympic diploma. The 2013 IPC European Judo Championships were held in early December in Eger, Hungary, and she competed in them. In July 2013, she was one of 306 from Navarre named as a "Deportistas de élite", a category of Spanish elite sportspeople that provides a number of benefits.
