= Li Liqing =

Chinese judoka (born 1993)

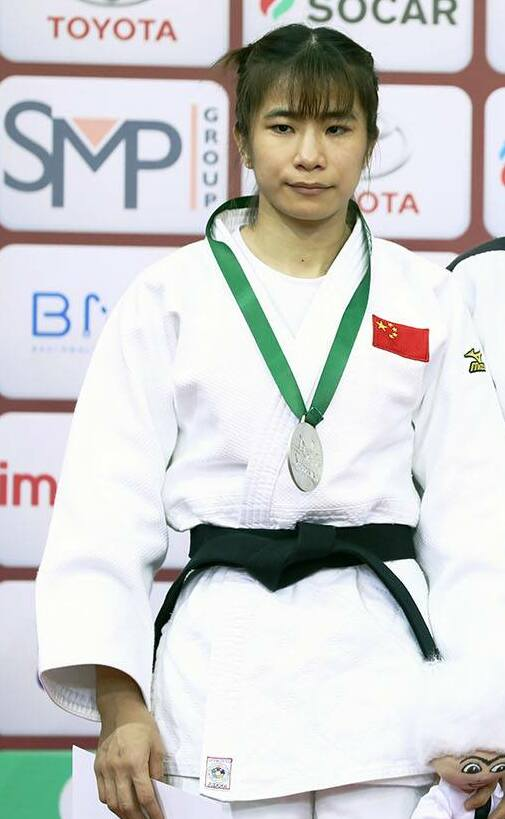
- Li at the 2019 IBSA Judo Grand Prix Baku

Personal information
- Nationality: Chinese
- Born: 19 June 1993 (age 33)
- Occupation: Judoka

Sport
- Country: China
- Sport: Para Judo
- Disability class: J2
- Weight class: −48 kg
Medal record
Women's para judo
Representing China
Paralympic Games
Gold medal – first place	2016 Rio de Janeiro	−48 kg
Bronze medal – third place	2024 Paris	−48 kg J2
Asian Para Games
Gold medal – first place	2014 Incheon	–48 kg
Bronze medal – third place	2018 Jakarta	–48 kg

Profile at external databases
- JudoInside.com: 99632

Li Liqing (born 19 June 1993) is a Chinese judoka. She won the gold medal at the Women's 48 kg event at the 2016 Summer Paralympics.
