= Karla Cardoso =

Brazilian Paralympic judoka (born 1981)

Karla Ferreira Cardoso
Personal information
- Born: 18 November 1981 (age 44) Rio de Janeiro, RJ
- Occupation: Judoka
- Height: 155 cm (5 ft 1 in)

Sport
- Country: Brazil
- Sport: Paralympic judo
Medal record
Paralympic judo
Representing Brazil
Paralympic Games
Silver medal – second place	2004 Athens	-48kg
Silver medal – second place	2008 Beijing	-48kg
World Championships
Bronze medal – third place	2013 Brommat	-48kg
Bronze medal – third place	2014 Colorado	-48kg
Parapan American Games
Gold medal – first place	2007 Rio de Janeiro	-48kg
Gold medal – first place	2015 Toronto	-48kg
Bronze medal – third place	2019 Lima	-48kg

Profile at external databases
- JudoInside.com: 89733

Karla Ferreira Cardoso (born November 18, 1981) is a partially blind Brazilian judoka who plays in international level events. She is a double silver Paralympic medalist, two time Parapan American Games champion and double bronze World medalist.
