= Lee Kai-lin =

Taiwanese Paralympic judoka

Lee Kai-Lin
Personal information
- Born: 15 July 1992 (age 33)

Sport
- Country: Chinese Taipei
- Sport: Paralympic judo
- Disability: Optic nerve atrophy
Medal record
Paralympic judo
Representing Chinese Taipei
Paralympic Games
Silver medal – second place	2012 London	Women's -48kg
World Championships
Gold medal – first place	2010 Antalya	Women's -48kg
Bronze medal – third place	2018 Lisbon	Women's -48kg
Asian Para Games
Silver medal – second place	2010 Guangzhou	Women's -48kg
Silver medal – second place	2014 Incheon	Women's -48kg
Bronze medal – third place	2018 Jakarta	Women's -48kg

Lee Kai-lin (born 15 July 1992) is a Taiwanese Paralympic judoka who competes at international judo competitions. She is a Paralympic silver medalist, three-time Asian Para Games medalist and a IBSA World Games champion. Lee was the first Taiwanese female judoka to win a medal at the Paralympics.
