= Yuliya Halinska =

Ukrainian Paralympic judoka (born 1988)

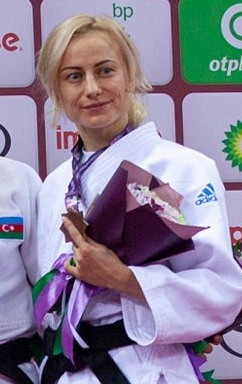

Personal information
- Born: 27 October 1988 (age 37)
- Occupation: Judoka

Sport
- Country: Ukraine
- Sport: Paralympic judo
Medal record
Paralympic judo
Representing Ukraine
Paralympic Games
Bronze medal – third place	2012 London	-48 kg
Bronze medal – third place	2016 Rio de Janeiro	-48 kg
Bronze medal – third place	2020 Tokyo	-48 kg
IBSA European Judo Championships
Gold medal – first place	2011 Crawley	-48 kg
Gold medal – first place	2013 Eger	-48 kg
Gold medal – first place	2017 Walsall	-48 kg
Bronze medal – third place	2009 Debrecen	-48 kg
European Para Championships
Silver medal – second place	2023 Rotterdam	–48 kg J2

Profile at external databases
- JudoInside.com: 89760

Yuliya Halinska (alternate transliteration Yuliia Ivanytska; born 27 October 1988) is a blind Ukrainian Paralympic judoka. She has won three Paralympic bronze medals for her country (in 2012, 2016, and 2020) and has won three ISBA (International Blind Sports Federation) European titles.
